= What If... the Watcher Broke His Oath? =

- What If...? episode
- Promotional poster featuring the Watcher and the Guardians of the Multiverse
- Episode no.: Season 1 Episode 9
- Directed by: Bryan Andrews
- Written by: A. C. Bradley
- Editing by: Graham Fisher; Joel Fisher
- Original release date: October 6, 2021
- Running time: 35 minutes

Cast
- Hayley Atwell as Peggy Carter / Captain Carter; Lake Bell as Natasha Romanoff / Black Widow; Frank Grillo as Brock Rumlow; Georges St-Pierre as Georges Batroc; Chadwick Boseman as Star-Lord T'Challa; Michael B. Jordan as N'Jadaka / Erik "Killmonger" Stevens; Chris Hemsworth as Thor; Benedict Cumberbatch as Doctor Strange Supreme; Toby Jones as Arnim Zola; Tom Hiddleston as Loki; Kurt Russell as Ego; Samuel L. Jackson as Nick Fury; Mick Wingert as Tony Stark / Iron Man; Brian T. Delaney as Peter Quill; Cynthia McWilliams as Gamora; Ozioma Akagha as Shuri; Ross Marquand as Ultron

Episode chronology
← Previous "What If... Ultron Won?"	Next → "What If... Nebula Joined the Nova Corps?"
- What If...? season 1

"What If... the Watcher Broke His Oath?" is the ninth episode and season finale of the first season of the American animated television series What If...?, based on the Marvel Comics series of the same name. It continues the previous episode's story, featuring the Watcher and Doctor Strange Supreme recruiting various heroes from parallel realities to fight against an alternate version of Ultron. The episode was written by head writer A. C. Bradley and directed by Bryan Andrews.

Jeffrey Wright narrates the series as the Watcher, with this episode also starring the voices of Hayley Atwell, Lake Bell, Frank Grillo, Georges St-Pierre, Chadwick Boseman, Michael B. Jordan, Chris Hemsworth, Benedict Cumberbatch (Strange), Toby Jones, Tom Hiddleston, Kurt Russell, Samuel L. Jackson, and Mick Wingert. The series began development by September 2018, with Andrews joining soon after, and many actors expected to reprise their roles from the Marvel Cinematic Universe films. Animation for the episode was provided by Flying Bark Productions, with Stephan Franck serving as head of animation.

"What If... the Watcher Broke His Oath?" was released on Disney+ on October 6, 2021. Critics praised the episode for bringing a satisfying conclusion to the season, its animation and the chemistry between the Guardians of the Multiverse, but criticized the unexpected appearance of the Gamora variant due to her episode, "What If... Iron Man Crashed into the Grandmaster?", being delayed to the second season.

== Plot ==
In Captain Peggy Carter and Star-Lord T'Challa's respective universes, (Note: As depicted in the episodes "What If... Captain Carter Were the First Avenger?" and "What If... T'Challa Became a Star-Lord?" respectively.) she fights Georges Batroc while he helps Peter Quill defeat Ego before the Watcher recruits Carter and T'Challa along with Doctor Strange Supreme, Erik "Killmonger" Stevens / Black Panther, "Party Thor", and a Gamora variant who battled on Sakaar alongside Tony Stark and killed her version of Thanos (Note: Strange, Killmonger, and Thor originate from the episodes "What If... Doctor Strange Lost His Heart Instead of His Hands?", "What If... Killmonger Rescued Tony Stark?" and "What If... Thor Were an Only Child?", respectively, while Gamora originates from the episode "What If... Iron Man Crashed into the Grandmaster?", which was delayed to the second season due to COVID-19 pandemic-related production issues.) to form the Guardians of the Multiverse and stop Ultron, who plans to destroy the Multiverse. (Note: As depicted in the eighth episode, "What If... Ultron Won?".)

The team prepares for battle in a universe lacking intelligent life, but Thor accidentally draws Ultron's attention. A battle ensues, which ends with T'Challa stealing the Soul Stone and Strange teleporting a horde of zombies onto Ultron, (Note: The horde originates from the episode, "What If... Zombies?!".) before escaping to Ultron's home universe. There, they meet its version of Natasha Romanoff before they are interrupted by a returning Ultron, who had defeated the zombies. The team manages to subdue Ultron, allowing Gamora to use the Infinity Crusher device in an attempt to destroy the Infinity Stones. However, this fails as the Crusher and the Stones are from different universes.

Ultron re-engages the team and begins to overpower them until Romanoff, with Carter's help, shoots Ultron with one of Clint Barton's arrows, having uploaded Arnim Zola's A.I. onto it, so Zola can destroy Ultron's mind. With Ultron defeated, Killmonger steals Ultron's armor and Infinity Stones, intending to use them to "fix [their] worlds". After the group refuses to help him, Zola reactivates Ultron's body and fights Killmonger for the Stones before Strange and the Watcher freeze them in time and seal them inside a pocket dimension, which Strange agrees to watch over.

The Watcher returns Carter, T'Challa, Thor, and Gamora to their home universes, though Romanoff refuses to return to hers. Accepting her wish, the Watcher brings her to a universe where most of the Avengers were assassinated by Yellowjacket, (Note: As depicted in the episode "What If... the World Lost Its Mightiest Heroes?".) where she rescues Nick Fury from Loki. The Watcher continues to watch over the Multiverse, which he now vows to protect.

In a mid-credits scene, following her return, Carter and her universe's Romanoff defeat Batroc before discovering the Hydra Stomper armor with someone contained inside.

== Production ==
=== Development ===
External videos
- What If... the Watcher Broke His Oath? | Marvel Studios' What If...? | Disney+, a promotional video introducing the episode's "what if" concept with narration by Jeffrey Wright as the Watcher, video from the What If...? Twitter account

By September 2018, Marvel Studios was developing an animated anthology series based on the What If...? comic books, which would explore how the Marvel Cinematic Universe (MCU) films would be altered if certain events occurred differently. Head writer A. C. Bradley joined the project in October 2018, with director Bryan Andrews meeting Marvel Studios executive Brad Winderbaum about the project as early as 2018; Bradley and Andrews' involvement was announced in August 2019. They executive produce alongside Winderbaum, Kevin Feige, Louis D'Esposito, and Victoria Alonso. Bradley wrote the ninth episode, titled "What If... the Watcher Broke His Oath?", which was released on Disney+ on October 6, 2021. In the episode's alternate storyline, Ultron continues with his plans after having successfully transferred his consciousness into Vision's body. The episode also reimagines moments of the films The Avengers (2012), Captain America: The Winter Soldier (2014), Avengers: Age of Ultron (2015), Guardians of the Galaxy Vol. 2 (2017), Thor: Ragnarok (2017), Avengers: Infinity War (2018), and Avengers: Endgame (2019).

=== Writing ===
Unlike other episodes, this episode acts as a direct continuation to the previous one. Andrews stated that the creative team always planned to make this episode bring together all the stories from previous episodes and Bradley stated that the season finale's major source of tension involves if the Watcher will break his oath of not interfering or he will stay as usual doing nothing, musing if he will always watch and not interfere or will "a story" force him to intervene. Bradley also felt that the episode will finally answer the show's end tag.

The episode would revisit various characters from previous episodes, including Peggy Carter / Captain Carter from the first episode, Doctor Strange Supreme from the fourth episode, Thor from the seventh episode, and Erik "Killmonger" Stevens from the sixth episode. An alternate Gamora who killed Thanos is introduced in this episode; an episode exploring her what if scenario was originally intended to release during the first season, but was delayed to the second following COVID-19 pandemic-related production issues. Gamora was chosen by the Watcher over the Tony Stark of that universe because the creatives felt she had a "cool" outfit and she had more of an emotional connection to the Infinity Stones than Stark did. Story editor Matthew Chauncey noted that the expectation was that the Watcher would have taken Stark, and felt that switch would have "played better" if the episode had aired in the first season. Bradley revealed that it was early on in production that it was decided these characters would return for a resolution in the finale, thus the ending of each episode had a cliffhanger.

The episode included a mid-credits scene featuring Captain Carter, being the show's first after-credits scene. Early on the show's development, it was discussed to have post-credits scene in every episodes; Winderbaum and Feige insisted to not do so and air the episodes without additional content, but the creative team eventually felt the need to include an after-credits scene in the season finale to tease potential further adventures in the upcoming second season, especially for Captain Carter due to her popularity among the show's crew. The impetus for the scene's final shot was the crew's "way" to ask Marvel Studios to let them explore more of Captain Carter's universe. The mid-credits scene also depicts Carter as being friends with her universe's Natasha Romanoff / Black Widow, being two strong women who "support each other, save the day and have fun together", without being any jealously or competition among them. Bradley inspired their friendship with the one Steve Rogers / Captain America has with Bucky Barnes / Winter Soldier in the film series, in addition to the friendships she has with her female friends.

The Watcher sends Natasha Romanoff from the dystopian Ultron world to the world seen in the third episode of the season because the creative realized that returning her to her world "was a fate worse than death". Bradley added that this decision came from what they wanted to say about the Watcher, who "loves these stories, these people, these heroes" and how he would not want to banish her back to her original world by herself.

=== Casting ===
Jeffrey Wright narrates the episode as the Watcher, with Marvel planning to have other characters in the series voiced by the actors who portrayed them in the MCU films. The episode stars previous-episode actors Hayley Atwell as Peggy Carter / Captain Carter, Lake Bell as Natasha Romanoff / Black Widow, Frank Grillo as Brock Rumlow, Chadwick Boseman as Star-Lord T'Challa, Michael B. Jordan as N'Jadaka / Erik "Killmonger" Stevens, Chris Hemsworth as Thor, Benedict Cumberbatch as Doctor Strange Supreme, Toby Jones as Arnim Zola, Tom Hiddleston as Loki, Kurt Russell as Ego, Samuel L. Jackson as Nick Fury, and Mick Wingert as Tony Stark / Iron Man. Georges St-Pierre also reprises his role as Georges Batroc from previous MCU media.

Brian T. Delaney, Ozioma Akagha, and Ross Marquand reprise their roles as Peter Quill, Shuri, and Ultron from the second, seventh, and eighth episode, respectively, in which they replaced MCU stars Chris Pratt, Letitia Wright, and James Spader. Cynthia McWilliams voices Gamora, replacing Zoe Saldaña. This version of Gamora was marketed as "Gamora, Daughter of Thanos". Eitri, Pepper Potts, Steve Rogers / Captain America, Sam Wilson / Falcon, Clint Barton / Hawkeye, Wanda Maximoff, and Carol Danvers / Captain Marvel appear in non-speaking roles.

=== Animation ===
Animation for the episode was provided by Flying Bark Productions, with Stephan Franck serving as head of animation. Andrews developed the series' cel-shaded animation style with Ryan Meinerding, the head of visual development at Marvel Studios. Though the series has a consistent art style, elements such as the camera and color palette differ between episodes.

To depict the fighting styles of both Ultron and the Watcher in this episode and its predecessor, the animators used the Kirby Krackle, which helped to showcase the immense multiversal power both characters have. Bradley was adamant to adopt this artistic convention for the show due to never being used in the franchise's live-action films.

=== Music ===
A soundtrack for the episode was released digitally by Marvel Music and Hollywood Records on October 8, 2021, featuring composer Laura Karpman's score.

What If... the Watcher Broke His Oath? (Original Soundtrack)
No.	Title	Length
1.	"Good Dancer"	0:34
2.	"Relax Son"	0:35
3.	"Protégé"	1:09
4.	"Vegas"	0:44
5.	"You Again"	0:57
6.	"Hiding Anywhere"	0:41
7.	"You Picked Them"	0:54
8.	"This Place"	1:07
9.	"Pop Up Pub"	0:42
10.	"Life After All"	1:03
11.	"All Too Easy"	2:33
12.	"Stand Down"	1:05
13.	"Not BFFs"	2:10
14.	"Wasn't So Hard"	1:30
15.	"Warning"	1:29
16.	"Bullseye"	0:58
17.	"Permanent Condition"	0:49
18.	"Infected"	1:28
19.	"Growing Apart"	1:36
20.	"Your Sacrifice"	1:52
21.	"Metaphor"	1:49
22.	"Her Spirit"	1:51
23.	"Guardians"	2:33
Total length:		30:09

== Marketing ==
After the episode's release, Marvel announced merchandise inspired by the episode as part of its weekly "Marvel Must Haves" promotion for each episode of the series, including apparel, accessories, and Funko Pops based on Frost Giant Loki, Infinity Killmonger, Gamora with Thanos' blade, Captain Carter with her stealth suit, and the Watcher. Marvel also released a poster for the episode, featuring Gamora, Romanoff, T'Challa, Carter, Strange Supreme, Killmonger, Thor, and the Watcher, together with a quote from the episode and the title "Guardians of the Multiverse".

== Reception ==
Kirsten Howard at Den of Geek praised the animation and design as "top-notch" and commended the chemistry between Carter and Romanoff. Howard considered the episode enjoyable, but clarified that it "stops short of greatness" given that the episode centered on Gamora and Stark had been delayed due to the COVID-19 pandemic. She gave the episode 4 out of 5 stars. io9's Charles Pulliam-Moore praised the episode as a satisfying close to the season, in comparison to the abrupt endings of previous episodes. Pulliam-Moore enjoyed the character interactions, particularly between Romanoff and Carter. However, he criticized the post-credits scene as "one of [Marvel Studios'] less compelling." Amon Warmann at Yahoo! Movies considered the episode was successful in combining characters from different realities, and compared its storytelling favorably to previous episodes. Warmann praised the balance between motifs in Karpman's musical score, and was impressed by the action scenes and visuals. He also commended the episode's tone, balancing "the gravity of the stakes" with Thor's levity. He thought the twist was expected, though he praised its conclusion and expressed interest in future seasons. IGN's Tom Jorgensen was more critical of the episode. He thought the finale prioritized action over good storytelling and considered it a "missed opportunity" to resolve the storylines of previous episodes. He thought the fight against Ultron was "underwhelming", comparing it negatively with that of episode eight and the fight against Thanos on Titan from Infinity War and felt the lack of familiarity between the characters made it "hard to get emotionally invested in the action".
