= What If... Agatha Went to Hollywood? =

- What If...? episode
- Promotional poster
- Episode no.: Season 3 Episode 2
- Directed by: Bryan Andrews
- Story by: Bryan Andrews; Matthew Chauncey; Ryan Little
- Teleplay by: Matthew Chauncey; Ryan Little
- Editing by: Graham Fisher
- Original release date: December 23, 2024
- Running time: 30 minutes

Cast
- Kathryn Hahn as Agatha Harkness; Kumail Nanjiani as Kingo; Dominic Cooper as Howard Stark; James D'Arcy as Edwin Jarvis; David Kaye as Arishem

Episode chronology
← Previous "What If... the Hulk Fought the Mech Avengers?"	Next → "What If... the Red Guardian Stopped the Winter Soldier?"
- What If...? season 3

"What If... Agatha Went to Hollywood?" is the second episode of the third season and twentieth episode overall of the American animated television series What If...?, based on the Marvel Comics series of the same name. It explores what would happen if Agatha Harkness became a Golden Age of Hollywood actress and worked alongside the Eternal Kingo to siphon Tiamut's powers. The episode was written by Bryan Andrews, Matthew Chauncey and Ryan Little and directed by Bryan Andrews.

Jeffrey Wright narrates the series as the Watcher, with this episode also starring the voices of Kathryn Hahn (Agatha), Kumail Nanjiani (Kingo), Dominic Cooper (Howard Stark), James D'Arcy (Edwin Jarvis) and David Kaye (Arishem). Work on a third season of What If...? had begun by July 2022, with Chauncey replacing previous head writer A. C. Bradley by December 2023. Andrews and Stephan Franck returned from previous seasons to direct. Animation for the season is provided by Flying Bark Productions and Stellar Creative Lab, with Scott Wright serving as head of animation.

"What If... Agatha Went to Hollywood?" was released on Disney+ on December 23, 2024 to positive reviews, with praise for its visuals, humor and voice cast.

== Plot ==
Agatha Harkness discovers the Celestial Tiamut within Earth and devises a plan to steal his energy through a ritual requiring vast resources. To achieve this, she collaborates with Howard Stark, starring in his production Cosmic Queen to access the necessary tools. Stark, alongside his butler Edwin Jarvis, enlists Bollywood star Kingo as Agatha's co-lead. During a dance number, Kingo confronts Agatha, revealing he knows her true intentions and aims to stop her. Their battle plays out on set, with Stark mistaking the combat for improvised special effects. Agatha eventually convinces Kingo to join her plan to stop the Emergence.

Arishem appears, furious at Kingo's betrayal. To complete her ritual, Agatha uses Stark's resources to gain access to Griffith Observatory. Stark agrees to help, provided he can document everything. At the observatory, Agatha taps into Kingo's energy to siphon Tiamut's power, transforming herself into a godlike being. Arishem arrives to confront her, but Agatha traps him with a rune and absorbs his power, destroying him. With Arishem gone, Agatha reveals her true plan: to use her newfound Celestial power to dominate the world, but Kingo convinces her otherwise, appealing to her love of fame and the transformative power of cinema.

At the Cosmic Queen premiere, Stark announces his pivot from weapons to film-making while Agatha and Kingo speak about their vision to inspire humanity whereas the latter worries that other Celestials will not leave the news of Arishem's death unanswered. As the Watcher narrates, looming Celestials appearing near him hint at future confrontations.

== Production ==
=== Development ===
Work had begun on a third season of What If...? by July 2022. At that time, head writer A. C. Bradley revealed that the second season of the series was her final project at Marvel Studios, with series story editor Matthew Chauncey taking over as head writer for the season. Series director Bryan Andrews returned for the third season along with Stephan Franck. Franck was able to assist Andrews in the season while the latter was simultaneously working on Marvel Zombies (2025); Andrews was still able to supervise much of the season and ultimately directed three of the season's episodes, including "What If... Agatha Went to Hollywood?" and co-directed with Franck for one episode, with Franck directing the other four episodes of the season. Executive producers for the season include Brad Winderbaum, Kevin Feige, Louis D'Esposito, Dana Vasquez-Eberhardt, and Andrews. In August 2024, it was announced that the third season would be the series' last. That November, Winderbaum explained that the series was ending due to "bigger [MCU] reasons" that were being determined in real time as different projects were released within the Multiverse Saga. He said it was the right time for the series to conclude "from a story perspective", but did not rule out reviving it in the future.

The character of Agatha Harkness was first announced as part of the cast for season 3 in August 2024 by Marvel Studios executive producer Brad Winderbaum. Winderbaum teased Agatha's featured episode and Kathryn Hahn reprising her role by saying: "It's one of my favorite episodes ever done, and it may involve the giant musical number, and she's just incredible." Hahn was so impressed with the concept of the musical numbers during the initial briefing that she expressed enthusiasm for performing them in a live-action format.

=== Writing ===
The episode was written by Matthew Chauncey and Ryan Little. Director Bryan Andrews highlighted the episode as one of his favorite storylines of the season, describing it as "a labor of love" and noting that it was "so different from what we normally do" for its humor, setting and homage to filmmaking and the Old Hollywood period. Cosmopolitan writer Leah Marilla Thomas described the episode as a "crossover" of the wider MCU projects Agatha All Along (2024), Eternals (2021) and Agent Carter (2015–2016).

=== Casting ===
Jeffrey Wright narrates the episode as the Watcher, with Marvel planning to have other characters in the series voiced by the actors who portrayed them in the MCU films. The episode stars the voices of Kathryn Hahn as Agatha Harkness, Kumail Nanjiani as Kingo, Dominic Cooper as Howard Stark, James D'Arcy as Edwin Jarvis and David Kaye as Arishem. Additional voices were provided by Terri Douglas, Piotr Michael, Kaitlyn Robrock, Fred Tatasciore, Kari Wahlgren, Matthew Wolf, Matthew Wood and Shelby Young.

=== Animation ===
Animation for the episode was provided by Stellar Creative Lab, with Scott Wright serving as head of animation. Bryan Andrews developed the series' cel-shaded animation style with Ryan Meinerding, the head of visual development at Marvel Studios. Though the series has a consistent art style, elements such as the camera and color palette differ between episodes.

=== Music ===
Laura Karpman returned from previous seasons as composer, along with Nora Kroll-Rosenbaum, who composed the score with Karpman for the show's second season. The official soundtrack was released by Hollywood Records on January 10, 2025.

A Bollywood and swing musical number is featured in the episode, combining influences from both traditions of music and dance. The sequence includes song "Jeet Jai Jamari", written by GAAYATRI, Brandon Brown and Ishaan Chhabra, and performed by GAYYATRI and Benny Dayal. The episode also features "Swing King", written by Pete Thomas and provided by Universal Production Music.

== Marketing ==
A teaser for the episode was released via Marvel Studios' social media on December 19, 2024. A promotional poster was subsequently released on December 21, 2024.

== Release ==
"What If... Agatha Went to Hollywood?" was released on Disney+ on December 23, 2024.

== Reception ==
The review aggregator website Rotten Tomatoes reported an 80% approval rating based on 5 five reviews.

CBR critic Joshua M. Patton awarded the episode a score of 8/10 and credited Agatha Harkness for most of the comedic and narrative impact, writing: "The story is rewarding and fun -- if only because fans get a little more time with Agatha."

== Accolades ==
At the 2025 Golden Trailer Awards, the episode was nominated for Best Action/Thriller TrailerByte for a TV/Streaming Series.
