= What If... Zombies?! =

- What If...? episode
- Promotional poster
- Episode no.: Season 1 Episode 5
- Directed by: Bryan Andrews
- Written by: Matthew Chauncey
- Editing by: Graham Fisher
- Original release date: September 8, 2021
- Running time: 31 minutes

Cast
- Mark Ruffalo as Bruce Banner / Hulk; Chadwick Boseman as T'Challa / Black Panther; Paul Bettany as Vision; Sebastian Stan as Bucky Barnes; Evangeline Lilly as Hope van Dyne / Wasp; Paul Rudd as Scott Lang / Ant-Man; Jon Favreau as Harold "Happy" Hogan / Zombie Happy; Danai Gurira as Okoye; Emily VanCamp as Sharon Carter; David Dastmalchian as Kurt; Hudson Thames as Peter Parker / Spider-Man; Tom Vaughan-Lawlor as Ebony Maw; Josh Keaton as Steve Rogers / Captain America

Episode chronology
← Previous "What If... Doctor Strange Lost His Heart Instead of His Hands?"	Next → "What If... Killmonger Rescued Tony Stark?"
- What If...? season 1

"What If... Zombies?!" is the fifth episode of the first season of the American animated television series What If...?, based on the Marvel Comics series of the same name. It explores what would happen if the events of the Marvel Cinematic Universe (MCU) films Ant-Man and the Wasp (2018) and Avengers: Infinity War (2018) occurred differently, with members of the Avengers becoming zombies and initiating a worldwide zombie apocalypse, while a group of survivors search for a cure. The episode was written by story editor Matthew Chauncey and directed by Bryan Andrews.

Jeffrey Wright narrates the series as the Watcher, with this episode also starring the voices of Mark Ruffalo, Chadwick Boseman, Paul Bettany, Sebastian Stan, Evangeline Lilly, Paul Rudd, Jon Favreau, Danai Gurira, Emily VanCamp, David Dastmalchian, Hudson Thames, and Tom Vaughan-Lawlor. The series began development by September 2018, with Andrews joining soon after, and many actors expected to reprise their roles from the MCU films. Animation for the episode was provided by Squeeze, with Stephan Franck serving as head of animation. The episode drew inspiration from the Marvel Zombies comic series.

"What If... Zombies?!" was released on Disney+ on September 8, 2021. The episode received mixed reviews from critics, with differing views on its tone, writing and story logic, and voice acting. An animated series based on the reality of the episode, Marvel Zombies, was released on Disney+ in September 2025, with three additional specials scheduled for release yearly in 2027, 2028, and 2029.

== Plot ==
Hank Pym enters the Quantum Realm to retrieve his long-lost wife Janet van Dyne, but she has been infected with a quantum virus that has turned her into a zombie. (Note: This infection is when the story diverges from the events of the film Ant-Man and the Wasp (2018).) She infects Pym before both return to his lab, attacking Scott Lang while their daughter, Hope van Dyne, escapes. Within 24 hours, the virus spreads across the Northwestern United States. The Avengers respond, but are infected themselves and turn the virus into a worldwide zombie apocalypse.

Two weeks later, Bruce Banner is sent to Earth to warn humanity of Thanos' threat. Thanos' lieutenants Ebony Maw and Cull Obsidian arrive, only to be turned into zombies by a zombified Tony Stark, Stephen Strange, and Wong. (Note: This attack is when the story diverges from the events of the film Avengers: Infinity War (2018).) Hope and the Cloak of Levitation kill the zombies, saving Banner. Another survivor, Peter Parker, brings Banner to meet the rest of their group—Bucky Barnes, Okoye, Sharon Carter, Kurt, and Happy Hogan. The group travels to Camp Lehigh in New Jersey, where they believe a cure for the virus is being developed, but are attacked by a zombified Steve Rogers, Clint Barton, and Sam Wilson, who infect Carter, Hogan, and Hope before the group kill the zombies in turn.

Before she succumbs to her infection, Hope sacrifices herself to bring the others to the camp, where they meet Vision, whose Mind Stone can reverse the virus's effects, exemplified by Lang's cured head being kept alive in a jar. However, the group also learns that Vision has been keeping a zombified Wanda Maximoff captive due to her resisting the Mind Stone and has been feeding other survivors to her, including T'Challa. Maximoff breaks free, kills Kurt, and infects Okoye while Vision, unwilling to live without Maximoff, sacrifices himself to give up the Mind Stone so the others can cure the world with it.

While Parker, Lang, T'Challa, and the Cloak escape in a quadjet, Banner also sacrifices himself to stay behind and turn into the Hulk to battle Maximoff and an oncoming zombie horde. In the hopes of broadcasting the Mind Stone's energy around the world, the survivors head to Wakanda, unaware that the country has been conquered by a zombified Thanos wielding a nearly-complete Infinity Gauntlet.

== Production ==
=== Development ===
External videos
- What If... Zombies?! | Marvel Studios' What If...? | Disney+, a promotional video introducing the episode's "what if" concept with narration by Jeffrey Wright as the Watcher, video from the What If...? Twitter account

By September 2018, Marvel Studios was developing an animated anthology series based on the What If...? comic books, which would explore how the Marvel Cinematic Universe (MCU) films would be altered if certain events occurred differently. Director Bryan Andrews met Marvel Studios executive Brad Winderbaum about the project as early as 2018, and his involvement was announced in August 2019. Andrews and Winderbaum executive produce alongside head writer A. C. Bradley, Kevin Feige, Louis D'Esposito, and Victoria Alonso. Story editor Matthew Chauncey wrote the fifth episode, titled "What If... Zombies?!", which features an alternate storyline of the 2018 films Ant-Man and the Wasp and Avengers: Infinity War. IGN's Tom Jorgensen said the episode title was a "jokey take" on the series' established naming convention, but was "also indicative of how much thought went into selling a zombie apocalypse that works in the MCU". This what if concept was chosen for the season over a Christmas-themed episode exploring what if the Avengers had shown up during the events of the MCU film Iron Man 3 (2013), told in the style of the film Love Actually (2003) vignettes; the Christmas-themed concept was ultimately used for the episode "What If... Happy Hogan Saved Christmas?" in the second season. "What If... Zombies?!" was released on Disney+ on September 8, 2021.

=== Writing ===
In the episode's alternate storyline, Janet van Dyne returns from the Quantum Realm with a quantum virus that spreads throughout the worlds population creating a zombie apocalypse. The episode is a dark comedy horror adaptation of the Marvel Zombies comic series (2005–2009), with a number of direct references to the comics in the episode, more so than any other What If...? episode. Bradley had previously attempted to write a "dark body horror" story in which Peter Parker / Spider-Man turns into a real spider, taking inspiration from Franz Kafka's novella The Metamorphosis (1915), which Marvel rejected for being too dark for their target PG-13/TV-14 audience. She then pitched the idea of MCU characters turning into zombies as an alternative story idea, not knowing about the existing Marvel Zombies series. Feige had previously expressed interest in a live-action Marvel Zombies adaptation in 2013, but was not able to accurately adapt the storyline to film due to the MCU's target demographic; he encouraged Bradley to pursue the idea in animated form for What If...?.

Chauncey was the one to "spearhead" the episode, initially creating a draft with more gruesome deaths. He and Bradley were hesitant to have T'Challa / Black Panther appear without his leg because the racial implications of "a white couple [Vision and Wanda Maximoff] basically feasting off a man of color", but decided to include it as a reference to a significant part of the Marvel Zombies comic. They rationalized that losing a limb in a zombie apocalypse was "getting away easy" when compared to someone like Scott Lang / Ant-Man, who ends up with his head in a jar. Other Easter eggs in the episode include a reference to the phrase "till the end of the line" from the MCU film Captain America: The Winter Soldier (2014); an homage to the logo of Mutant Enemy Productions, the production company of the horror television series Buffy the Vampire Slayer (1997–2003); and the MCU's first mention of Peter Parker's Uncle Ben. This was included in early drafts of the script and was kept despite Bradley and Chauncey expecting Marvel to request its removal.

=== Casting ===
Jeffrey Wright narrates the episode as the Watcher, with Marvel planning to have other characters in the series voiced by the actors who portrayed them in the MCU films. The episode stars the returning voices of Mark Ruffalo as Bruce Banner / Hulk, Chadwick Boseman as T'Challa / Black Panther, Paul Bettany as Vision, Sebastian Stan as Bucky Barnes / Winter Soldier, Evangeline Lilly as Hope van Dyne / Wasp, Paul Rudd as Scott Lang / Ant-Man, Jon Favreau as Harold "Happy" Hogan / Zombie Happy, Danai Gurira as Okoye, Emily VanCamp as Sharon Carter, David Dastmalchian as Kurt and Tom Vaughan-Lawlor as Ebony Maw.

Tom Holland does not reprise his role as Peter Parker / Spider-Man from the film series, with Hudson Thames voicing the character in the episode; Winderbaum attributed Holland's recasting to possible conflicts with the deal for the character's film rights between The Walt Disney Company and Sony Pictures. Though Thames sounds similar to Holland, he created his own performance so he could identify with the character. The character was marketed as "Zombie Hunter Spider-Man". Josh Keaton reprises his role as Steve Rogers / Captain America from the first episode, in which he had replaced MCU star Chris Evans. Several characters appear in non-speaking roles, including Tony Stark / Iron Man, Dr. Stephen Strange, Wong, Cull Obsidian, Hank Pym, Janet van Dyne, Natasha Romanoff / Black Widow, Clint Barton / Hawkeye, Sam Wilson / Falcon, Wanda Maximoff, and Thanos; many of these characters appear as zombie versions of themselves.

=== Animation ===
Animation for the episode was provided by Squeeze, with Stephan Franck serving as head of animation. Andrews developed the series' cel-shaded animation style with Ryan Meinerding, the head of visual development at Marvel Studios. Though the series has a consistent art style, elements such as the camera and color palette differ between episodes. Concept art for the episode is included during the end credits and was released online by Marvel following the episode's premiere.

=== Music ===
A soundtrack for the episode was released digitally by Marvel Music and Hollywood Records on September 10, 2021, featuring composer Laura Karpman's score.

What If... Zombies?! (Original Soundtrack)
No.	Title	Length
1.	"Too Late?"	1:22
2.	"Overkill"	2:12
3.	"Searching"	1:23
4.	"Hope"	0:48
5.	"Grand Central"	1:20
6.	"Station Brawl"	2:33
7.	"Snakes on a Train"	1:10
8.	"You're in Trouble"	1:25
9.	"Walk Through That"	2:05
10.	"Brian Stuff"	1:04
11.	"Trap"	2:42
12.	"Man-Eater"	2:53
13.	"Avenge Us"	1:27
14.	"Saved Twice"	2:23
Total length:		24:47

== Marketing ==
On August 7, 2021, Marvel announced a series of posters created by various artists to correspond with the episodes of the series, including a poster featuring zombified versions of Iron Man and Captain America in an apocalyptic New York City designed by Chris Christodoulou, as part of a series of posters for the series. Mira Jacobs of Comic Book Resources noted the "bleak" alternate universe depicted in the poster, as well as "a horde of zombies lurking in the darkness" and "a broken version of the Avengers logo". After the episode's release, Marvel announced merchandise inspired by the episode as part of its weekly "Marvel Must Haves" promotion for each episode of the series, including apparel, accessories, Funko Pops, Marvel Legends figures, and Lego minifigures based on the zombie versions of characters.

== Reception ==
David Opie at Digital Spy said the episode "deliver[s] the goods" and was a surprisingly faithful adaptation of the Marvel Zombies comics, praising its balance of sad, comedic, and gruesome moments. Kirsten Howard of Den of Geek agreed that "What If... Zombies?!" was a fun episode, especially for fans of the Marvel Zombies comics, and felt it was full of standout moments such as Parker's "glorious zombie training video". Howard said Parker's struggle to keep hope alive in the zombie apocalypse was similar to the Marvel Zombies: Resurrection comic storyline and was "just as affecting". She also highlighted the Cloak of Levitation, Kurt, and Happy Hogan, and gave the episode 4.5 out of 5 stars. Writing for The A.V. Club, Sam Barsanti believed the episode had "all of the violence, black humor, and brain-chomping that you'd expect", and gave the episode a "B−". Barsanti felt Parker's interjections of pop culture references successfully undercut the episode's horror elements despite being a repetitive trope after stories such as the film Zombieland (2009).

Tom Jorgensen of IGN was more negative about the episode, comparing it to "What If... Doctor Strange Lost His Heart Instead of His Hands?" which had darkness rooted in Doctor Strange's character arc while the story of "What If... Zombies?!" just "shambles along" between different zombie encounters; he scored the episode 5 out of 10. Jorgensen criticized the episode's tonal inconsistencies and comedy, feeling the latter was overused and detracted from the realism of the story's MCU connections. He also took issue with the virus being explained only as a "quantum virus", which he felt was lazy writing. Jorgensen enjoyed how the outbreak affected Vision, but was disappointed that the episode quickly moved past its exploration of the character's disregard for human life in trying to save Maximoff. He was mostly positive about the action sequences, but felt they were hindered by the episode's unclear logic for why the zombie characters could use their superpowers. Amon Warmann agreed with Jorgensen's sentiments in his review for Yahoo! News, finding the overall episode to be unsatisfying and the weakest of the series so far. He was positive about Parker's "eternal optimism" and his relationship with Hope, and he said Hope's final act of going giant size for the first time in the MCU was "beautifully played", but he found the episode to otherwise be rushed with even more pacing issues than what he had highlighted for previous episodes. Like Jorgensen, Warmann also compared this episode to the previous one's tragic tone, criticizing "What If... Zombies?!" for trying to move between dark and comedic tones in a "disjointed" way and for the inconsistent way the characters felt about killing zombie versions of other heroes.

Despite his mostly negative feelings for the episode, Jorgensen was positive about the voice acting which is something he had criticized in earlier episodes. He specifically highlighted the performances of Gurira, Boseman, and Dastmalchian. Warmann, on the other hand, felt the series' voice acting was "more mixed than ever", criticizing the performances of Ruffalo and Stan. He felt Lilly gave the episode's strongest performance, and was shocked at how close Thames' voice was to Tom Holland's portrayal of Parker. Barsanti thought Thames did a fine job replacing Holland, and enjoyed Rudd's comedic performance as well as the visual joke of the Cloak of Levitation flying around with Lang's head in a jar. He was surprised at Boseman's role in the episode after the second episode had been presented as a farewell to the late actor. Opie, Barsanti, Jorgensen, and Warmann all highlighted Boseman's poignant line in the episode: "In my culture, death is not the end. They're still with us, as long as we do not forget them."

== Marvel Zombies series and specials ==
In November 2021, a Marvel Zombies animated series was announced, with Andrews returning to direct and Zeb Wells serving as head writer. It is a continuation of the reality first introduced in this episode of the series, that "look[s] at that universe with a different lens", following a group of survivors who must fight former heroes and villains. Marvel Studios began development on the spin-off series after the positive fan response to the episode and its cliffhanger ending. The series picks up five years from the ending of the episode. Over 15 actors reprise their MCU roles in the series, with several actors from What If...? also reprising their roles. Marvel Zombies was released on Disney+ on September 24, 2025, and consists of four episodes. Three, two-episode television specials continuing the story of Marvel Zombies were announced in October 2026. Subtitled The Winter Soldier, The Fist of Khonshu, and The Last Guardian, they will be released around Halloween in 2027, 2028, and 2029, respectively. Andrews returns for the specials.
