= What If... Happy Hogan Saved Christmas? =

- What If...? episode
- Promotional poster
- Episode no.: Season 2 Episode 3
- Directed by: Bryan Andrews
- Written by: A. C. Bradley; Matthew Chauncey
- Editing by: Graham Fisher
- Original release date: December 24, 2023
- Running time: 29 minutes

Cast
- Jon Favreau as Happy Hogan / Freak; Kat Dennings as Darcy Lewis; Cobie Smulders as Maria Hill; Sam Rockwell as Justin Hammer; Chris Hemsworth as Thor; Mark Ruffalo as Bruce Banner; Jeremy Renner as Clint Barton / Hawkeye; Mick Wingert as Tony Stark / Iron Man; Lake Bell as Natasha Romanoff / Black Widow; Josh Keaton as Steve Rogers / Captain America; Isaac Robinson-Smith as Sergei; Matthew Waterson as Rusty; Ross Marquand as W.E.R.N.E.R.

Episode chronology
← Previous "What If... Peter Quill Attacked Earth's Mightiest Heroes?"	Next → "What If... Iron Man Crashed into the Grandmaster?"
- What If...? season 2

"What If... Happy Hogan Saved Christmas?" is the third episode of the second season and twelfth episode overall of the American animated television series What If...?, based on the Marvel Comics series of the same name. It explores what would happen if Happy Hogan had to prove himself when the Avengers Tower is attacked by Justin Hammer during a holiday party. The episode was written by head writer A. C. Bradley and Matthew Chauncey and directed by Bryan Andrews.

Jeffrey Wright narrates the series as the Watcher, with this episode also starring the voices of Jon Favreau (Hogan), Kat Dennings, Cobie Smulders, Sam Rockwell (Hammer), Chris Hemsworth, Mark Ruffalo, Jeremy Renner, Mick Wingert, Lake Bell, Josh Keaton, Isaac Robinson-Smith, Matthew Waterson, and Ross Marquand. Work on a second season of What If...? had begun by December 2019, with Andrews and Bradley returning from the first season. Animation was provided by SDFX Studios, with Scott Wright serving as head of animation.

"What If... Happy Hogan Saved Christmas?" was released on Disney+ on December 24, 2023.

== Plot ==
The Watcher narrates his favorite Christmas story in the Multiverse. On Christmas Eve, Happy Hogan is assigned to oversee security in the Avengers Tower for an annual holiday party, until Justin Hammer and his hired henchmen, Sergei and Rusty, break out of prison and lay siege on the Tower for Tony Stark's technology. (Note: Hammer's imprisonment was depicted in Iron Man 2 (2010). His attack is when the story diverges from the Sacred Timeline of the MCU.) With Maria Hill injured attempting to apprehend him, Hammer and his henchmen plan to obtain Stark's armor and Bruce Banner's Hulk blood sample.

Attempting to save the Hulk blood sample, Hogan is accidentally injected with it, causing him to slowly transform into a purple Hulk-like monster. However, Hogan manages to retain his intelligence in this form, which Hammer calls "Freak". With the Avengers busy with the Christmas-related activities and J.A.R.V.I.S. inactive, Hogan contacts his intern Darcy Lewis, who is tasked to find an artificial intelligence (AI) to reboot the Tower's system. They find an AI named W.E.R.N.E.R. who is of no help to them.

As Hammer, Sergei, and Rusty take Lewis and Hill hostage, a fully-transformed Hogan confronts him, forcing Sergei and Rusty to flee, and destroys the hijacked Iron Legion probes. Hammer takes control of Stark's Hulkbuster armor, but Hogan defeats him before the Avengers arrive. The Avengers think that Hogan (in his Freak form) is the threat and attack him, until Lewis clears it up and points to a defeated Hammer. After Hammer is accidentally knocked out of Avengers Tower, he is saved by Hogan.

With Hammer in his clutches, Hogan apologizes to Stark about what happened to the party, hoping that most of Stark's insurance will cover it. Stark responds that Hogan is the only insurance policy he needs. Hogan is then praised for his efforts as Stark does not hold him accountable for what happened. Hogan and the Avengers resume their Christmas party as Hammer is taken into custody, buoyed by the late arrival of Thor who asked what he missed.

== Production ==
=== Development ===
In December 2019, Marvel Studios president Kevin Feige revealed that work had already begun on a second season of the animated anthology series What If...?, based on the Marvel Comics series of the same name. It explores how the Marvel Cinematic Universe (MCU) films would be altered if certain events occurred differently. A. C. Bradley and Bryan Andrews returned from the first season as head writer and lead director, and they executive produce alongside Brad Winderbaum, Kevin Feige, Louis D'Esposito, and Victoria Alonso. Bradley and Matthew Chauncey wrote the third episode, titled "What If... Happy Hogan Saved Christmas?". After voicing Happy Hogan in the first season of What If...?, actor Jon Favreau requested that he have a headlining episode for the second season and that he would become the Freak, the moniker Hogan received in the comics after temporarily becoming a Hulk-like creature. Bradley and Chauncey were previously unfamiliar with this aspect of the character from the comics.

=== Writing ===
The episode is a holiday-themed episode centered on Happy Hogan proving himself when the Avengers Tower is attacked by Justin Hammer during a holiday party, and was inspired by Die Hard (1988). Bradley said they initially wanted to look to Favreau's films such as Elf (2003) for inspiration, before selecting Die Hard given it was her favorite film when she was younger. The episode references some of Favreau's prior work, such as The Chef Show (2019–20). The creatives were reluctant to tell the cast that the episode was meant to be a Die Hard homage, but Justin Hammer actor Sam Rockwell was enthused after realizing Hammer was meant to be the Hans Gruber of the episode. Hogan's characterization in the episode is not much of a departure from his film appearances, with Bradley saying they did not want it to be "Happy Hogan goes John Wick", and in wanting to keep the tone "light and fun", the Freak is not to the full extent of the character as it is in the comics.

Bradley and Chauncey had created a Christmas-themed episode in the first season, exploring what if the Avengers had shown up during Iron Man 3 (2013), told in the style of Love Actually (2003) vignettes, that was passed on by Marvel Studios in favor of "What If... Zombies?!"; this made them want to try to find a way to fit a Christmas episode into the second season. The duo were writing the episode in March 2020 when lockdowns started because of the COVID-19 pandemic, and continued doing so together during the pandemic as "an escapism exercise". They enjoyed the challenge of figuring out who the "would-be heroes" would be to save the Tower, "creating this sweet, meta-narrative where these characters who usually play the sidekick role in the movies finally get to step into the limelight and be the heroes of the story"; this also played into the holiday theme they were looking to emulate by allowing "fan-favorite characters their moment to shine". The episode features a joke of holiday shoppers trying to get the last Iron Man action figure in a store, with plenty of Hawkeye figures still available and discounted. Andrews called it "an appropriate joke" because the people take "potshots" at the character that "it just made sense", and likened the joke to the film Jingle All the Way (1996).

=== Casting ===
Jeffrey Wright narrates the episode as the Watcher, with Marvel planning to have other characters in the series voiced by the actors who portrayed them in the MCU films. The episode stars Jon Favreau as Happy Hogan / "The Freak", Kat Dennings as Darcy Lewis, Cobie Smulders as Maria Hill, Sam Rockwell as Justin Hammer, Chris Hemsworth as Thor, Mark Ruffalo as Bruce Banner, Jeremy Renner as Clint Barton / Hawkeye, Mick Wingert as Tony Stark / Iron Man, Lake Bell as Natasha Romanoff / Black Widow, Josh Keaton as Steve Rogers / Captain America, Isaac Robinson-Smith as Sergei, Matthew Waterson as Rusty, and Ross Marquand as W.E.R.N.E.R., Stark's AI. The creatives approached Werner Herzog to voice the AI, but he "respectfully declined"; Marquand's performance was called a "valiant" Herzog impression. Renner created additional ad libs for the Hawkeye figure joke, which Andrews had hoped to include if there was additional time in the episode.

=== Animation ===
Animation for the episode was provided by SDFX Studios, with Scott Wright serving as head of animation. Andrews developed the series' cel-shaded animation style with Ryan Meinerding, the head of visual development at Marvel Studios. Though the series has a consistent art style, elements such as the camera and color palette differ between episodes.

=== Music ===
A five-track EP for the episode was released digitally by Marvel Music and Hollywood Records on December 15, 2023, featuring composer Laura Karpman and Nora Kroll-Rosenbaum's score. The Craig Gilder Sextet and Tony Liberto's cover of "We Wish You a Merry Christmas" is heard during the end credits.

What If... Happy Hogan Saved Christmas? (Season 2/Episode 3) [Original Soundtrack]
No.	Title	Length
1.	"Snow Days"	0:45
2.	"Sugar Cookies"	1:20
3.	"Fa La La"	1:11
4.	"All Is Bright"	0:46
5.	"Merrily On"	0:49
Total length:		4:51

== Release ==
"What If... Happy Hogan Saved Christmas?" was released on Disney+ on December 24, 2023. It had a premiere screening, along with the first episode "What If... Nebula Joined the Nova Corps?", at the Walt Disney Studios lot in Burbank, California on December 11, 2023, along with a Q&A with the creatives.

== Reception ==
Arezou Amin at Collider felt the episode took "full advantage" of releasing on Christmas Eve, saying it "beautifully blends the high stakes that usually come with an Avengers team-up together with the low stakes of having to prepare for a Christmas party to create the perfect little gift of an episode".
