= What If... the World Lost Its Mightiest Heroes? =

- What If...? episode
- Promotional poster
- Episode no.: Season 1 Episode 3
- Directed by: Bryan Andrews
- Written by: A. C. Bradley; Matthew Chauncey
- Editing by: Joel Fisher
- Original release date: August 25, 2021
- Running time: 32 minutes

Cast
- Samuel L. Jackson as Nick Fury; Michael Douglas as Hank Pym / Yellowjacket; Lake Bell as Natasha Romanoff / Black Widow; Mick Wingert as Tony Stark / Iron Man; Clark Gregg as Phil Coulson; Frank Grillo as Brock Rumlow; Jeremy Renner as Clint Barton / Hawkeye; Stephanie Panisello as Betty Ross; Mark Ruffalo as Bruce Banner / Hulk; Tom Hiddleston as Loki; Mike McGill as Thaddeus Ross; Jaimie Alexander as Sif; Alexandra Daniels as Carol Danvers / Captain Marvel

Episode chronology
← Previous "What If... T'Challa Became a Star-Lord?"	Next → "What If... Doctor Strange Lost His Heart Instead of His Hands?"
- What If...? season 1

"What If... the World Lost Its Mightiest Heroes?" is the third episode of the first season of the American animated television series What If...?, based on the Marvel Comics series of the same name. It explores what would happen if the events of the Marvel Cinematic Universe (MCU) tie-in comic Fury's Big Week (2012) occurred differently, with Nick Fury's campaign to recruit the Avengers derailed by a string of deaths. The episode was written by head writer A. C. Bradley and story editor Matthew Chauncey, and directed by Bryan Andrews.

Jeffrey Wright narrates the series as the Watcher, with this episode also starring the voices of Samuel L. Jackson (Fury), Jeremy Renner, Mark Ruffalo, Tom Hiddleston, Clark Gregg, Jaimie Alexander, Frank Grillo, Lake Bell, and Mick Wingert. The series began development by September 2018, with Andrews and Bradley joining soon after, and many actors expected to reprise their roles from the MCU films; the events of Fury's Big Week are partially shown in the films The Incredible Hulk (2008), Iron Man 2 (2010), and Thor (2011). Other MCU moments are also reimagined in the episode, which becomes a murder mystery in the style of an Agatha Christie story. Animation was provided by Squeeze, with Stephan Franck serving as head of animation.

"What If... the World Lost Its Mightiest Heroes?" was released on Disney+ on August 25, 2021. Critics generally found the episode to be the weakest of the series' first three due to its less clear "what if?" scenario, although its darker storyline for an MCU project received praise. The episode's voice acting and connections to MCU films received mixed reviews.

== Plot ==
Over the course of a week, S.H.I.E.L.D. director Nick Fury attempts to recruit heroes for the Avengers Initiative, starting with Tony Stark. Agent Natasha Romanoff gives Stark an injection to alleviate his palladium poisoning, but it unexpectedly proves fatal. S.H.I.E.L.D. detains Romanoff, but Fury helps her escape so she can find the killer. Meanwhile, Thor arrives on Earth and attempts to retrieve his hammer Mjolnir, but is accidentally shot and killed by Agent Clint Barton, who later dies in S.H.I.E.L.D. custody.

To analyze what killed Stark, Romanoff approaches Dr. Betty Ross, who finds that a microscopic projectile was injected into Stark. Fury deduces that the killer is targeting his Avengers recruits, leaving Romanoff and Bruce Banner as the remaining targets. Romanoff discovers that Betty is hiding Banner just as Betty's father, General Thaddeus Ross, arrives to arrest them. Banner is shot and transforms into the Hulk, attacking Thaddeus's men before exploding.

Loki arrives on Earth with Asgard's army to avenge Thor's death, but Fury negotiates a temporary truce so that he can identify the killer. Romanoff discovers that someone used a deceased agent's profile to access S.H.I.E.L.D.'s network. She is subsequently murdered, though she manages to send a message to Fury revealing that the deaths are related to "hope". Fury realizes that Romanoff was referring to Hope van Dyne, who had died on a mission after Fury recruited her into S.H.I.E.L.D. (Note: Fury's choice to recruit Hope van Dyne is where the story diverges from the events of the Marvel Cinematic Universe.)

Fury proposes an alliance with Loki to catch the killer before they confront Hope's father Hank Pym, who built a "Yellowjacket" shrinking suit to commit the murders as a means of seeking revenge against Fury. Loki defeats Pym, who is taken into Asgardian custody, before opting to stay on Earth and subjugate humanity. Fury begins assembling more heroes, finding Steve Rogers frozen in ice and summoning Carol Danvers to Earth.

== Production ==
=== Development ===
External videos
- What If... The World Lost its Mightiest Heroes? | Marvel Studios' What If...? | Disney+, a promotional video introducing the episode's "what if" concept with narration by Jeffrey Wright as the Watcher, video from the What If...? Twitter account

By September 2018, Marvel Studios was developing an animated anthology series based on the What If...? comic books, which would explore how the Marvel Cinematic Universe (MCU) films would be altered if certain events occurred differently. Head writer A. C. Bradley joined the project in October 2018, with director Bryan Andrews meeting Marvel Studios executive Brad Winderbaum about the project as early as 2018; Bradley and Andrews' involvement was announced in August 2019. They executive produce alongside Winderbaum, Kevin Feige, Louis D'Esposito, and Victoria Alonso. Bradley and story editor Matthew Chauncey wrote the third episode, titled "What If... the World Lost Its Mightiest Heroes?" It features an alternate storyline of the MCU tie-in comic Fury's Big Week (2012), which covers a series of events that are partially shown in the films The Incredible Hulk (2008), Iron Man 2 (2010), and Thor (2011). Moments from multiple other MCU films are also reimagined in the alternate storyline. "What If... the World Lost Its Mightiest Heroes?" was released on Disney+ on August 25, 2021.

=== Writing ===
Winderbaum acknowledged that Fury's Big Week was an "obscure point of detail that only hardcore fans know", with Jake Kleinman at Inverse opining that the interconnected nature of The Incredible Hulk, Iron Man 2, and Thor would likely be a new revelation for many viewers. Despite this, Marvel Studios was "very aware" of Fury's Big Week and suggested to Bradley early in development of the series that she should base an episode on it. Her initial pitch was for a comedic episode inspired by French farce, where "everything just keeps falling apart", but the creatives found the comedic tone to be a poor match for the events when they were breaking the story.

In the episode's alternate storyline, Nick Fury's campaign to recruit the Avengers is derailed by a string of deaths, becoming a murder mystery in the style of an Agatha Christie story. Bradley explained that taking away Fury's plans for the Avengers Initiative gave him a "crisis of faith", making the character wonder if he was "ever on the right track? And what does he do next now that his greatest plan has turned to ashes?" This leads to the episode's night-time diner scene where Fury realizes that "the world needs the Avengers, and while he may have lost the first names on the list, there are other heroes out there". This scene had more material in the original script that was cut from the final episode.

The episode's premise was conceived "almost backwards", deciding on the outcome of the alternate storyline before determining the change to the MCU timeline that would cause it. For that, the writers had to work out who would be murdering the Avengers. After asking who would hate them enough in this time period to kill them, Winderbaum suggested Hank Pym from Ant-Man (2015) and Ant-Man and the Wasp (2018). Bradley agreed that Pym might do this if he lost his daughter, Hope van Dyne, since he would not "have been able to reconnect with his daughter by this point in the timeline. The loss of her, after the loss of his wife, it would have driven him over the edge." She developed the idea that Fury recruits Hope as a S.H.I.E.L.D. agent and then she dies on a mission. The episode suggests that van Dyne was sent on the Odesa mission that Natasha Romanoff discusses in Captain America: The Winter Soldier (2014). In that version, Romanoff survived being shot by the Winter Soldier, but in this episode's version van Dyne is killed. In addition to altering the events of Fury's Big Week with Pym's revenge plot, these changes also lead to scenes from The Avengers (2012) being reimagined in the episode.

Further discussing the episode, Kleinman felt revisiting the events of The Incredible Hulk in the episode helped to strengthen that film's connection to the MCU since it had "never really fit with the rest of the MCU tonally or stylistically". Eric Thomas at DiscussingFilm felt it was funny to discuss The Incredible Hulk as an MCU film due to the lack of references to it in later MCU projects, but Bradley did not feel this way as a fan of all MCU films and approached the episode's Incredible Hulk scenes the same way she did for the other MCU films. The writers wanted to pick iconic scenes from each of the Fury's Big Week films that audiences could easily recognize. Originally they wanted to feature the Harlem fight sequence from the end of The Incredible Hulk, but eventually changed to the earlier Culver University fight scene because it worked better for their story.

=== Casting and voice recording ===
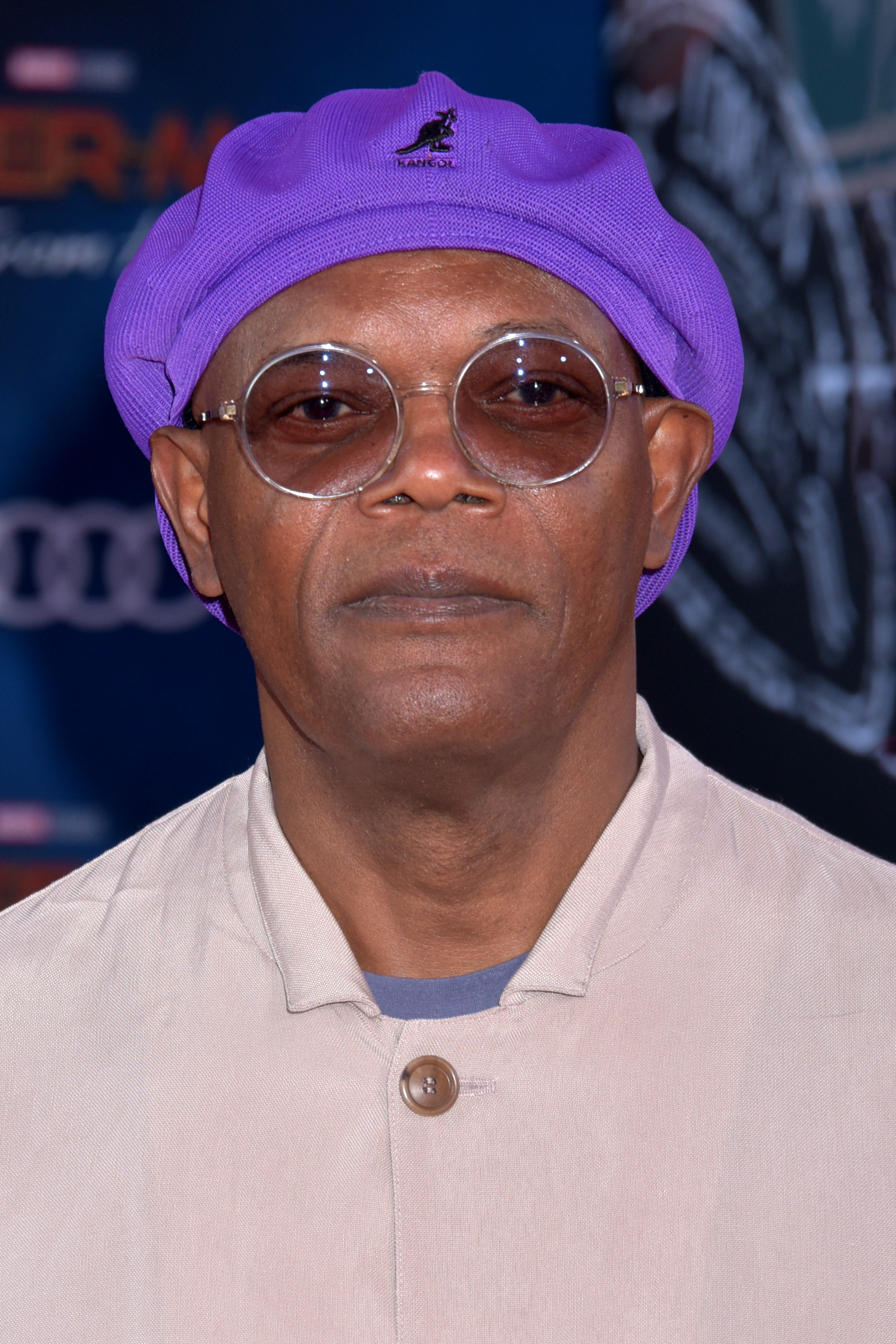
Samuel L. Jackson reprises his MCU role of Nick Fury in the episode, which tells an alternate storyline of the tie-in comic book Fury's Big Week (2012)

Jeffrey Wright narrates the episode as the Watcher, with Marvel planning to have other characters in the series voiced by the actors who portrayed them in the MCU films. This episode stars the returning voices of Samuel L. Jackson as Nick Fury, Michael Douglas as Hank Pym / Yellowjacket, Clark Gregg as Phil Coulson, Frank Grillo as Brock Rumlow, Jeremy Renner as Clint Barton / Hawkeye, Mark Ruffalo as Bruce Banner / Hulk, Tom Hiddleston as Loki, and Jaimie Alexander as Sif. Gregg improvised various lines during recording, including some "fangirl" moments over the appearance of Thor, who has a non-speaking role in the episode along with the Destroyer and the Warriors Three.

Edward Norton portrayed Bruce Banner in The Incredible Hulk, with Ruffalo taking over the role for subsequent MCU films. This episode integrates Ruffalo's version of the character into alternate versions of scenes from that film, which Kleinman felt created "much cleaner continuity" between The Incredible Hulk and the rest of Banner's MCU story. Bradley had joked early in development that they should get Norton to reprise his role if Ruffalo was not available, but Ruffalo had already agreed to return for the series by then. New actors taking over from MCU stars in the episode include Lake Bell as Natasha Romanoff / Black Widow, replacing Scarlett Johansson; Mick Wingert as Tony Stark / Iron Man, replacing Robert Downey Jr.; Stephanie Panisello as Betty Ross, replacing Liv Tyler; Mike McGill as Thaddeus Ross, replacing William Hurt; and Alexandra Daniels as Carol Danvers / Captain Marvel, replacing Brie Larson. An uncredited actor voices Jack Rollins, replacing Callan Mulvey.

=== Animation ===
Animation for the episode was provided by Squeeze, with Stephan Franck serving as head of animation. Andrews developed the series' cel-shaded animation style with Ryan Meinerding, the head of visual development at Marvel Studios. Though the series has a consistent art style, elements such as the camera and color palette differ between episodes. Concept art for the episode is included during the end credits, and was released online by Marvel following the episode's premiere.

=== Music ===
Composer Laura Karpman combined elements of existing MCU scores with original music for the series, but chose to mostly write an original score for this episode rather than combining music from all the different films that the episode adapts. She likened her music to the Loki soundtrack, calling her score "whacky and modernist", with a new theme for the murder mystery storyline. A soundtrack for the episode was released digitally by Marvel Music and Hollywood Records on August 27, 2021, featuring Karpman's score.

What If... the World Lost Its Mightiest Heroes? (Original Soundtrack)
No.	Title	Length
1.	"All in One Week"	1:24
2.	"Can't Wait"	0:58
3.	"Hold This"	0:46
4.	"Missing"	0:57
5.	"Sound the Alarm"	2:17
6.	"Smells Like Lavender"	3:22
7.	"Maybe Middle Earth"	1:10
8.	"Ancient Winters"	1:15
9.	"Double Trouble"	1:14
10.	"Blast"	1:33
11.	"You Won't Win"	1:59
12.	"One More Left"	1:28
13.	"Sound and Fury"	2:45
14.	"Don't Give a Damn"	1:04
15.	"Honor Her"	1:08
16.	"Taken Out"	0:51
17.	"Hope Never Dies"	0:51
Total length:		25:02

== Marketing ==
After the episode's release, Marvel released a promotional poster for the episode featuring Nick Fury and a quote from the episode. Marvel also announced merchandise as part of its weekly "Marvel Must Haves" promotion for each episode of the series, including apparel and accessories based on the Watcher and various heroes.

== Reception ==
=== Audience viewership ===
According to Nielsen Media Research, who measure the number of minutes watched by United States audiences on television sets, What If...? was the seventh-most watched original series across streaming services for the week of August 23 to August 29, 2021, with 233 million minutes watched.

=== Critical response ===
Kristen Howard, writing for Den of Geek, found the episode to be an "enjoyably ridiculous, twisty whodunnit" that was "a classic What If...? tale [using] a very silly twist to showcase just how bad everything could have been". She was shocked by the deaths of the Avengers, enjoyed Coulson's dialogue as well as the reveal of Pym as Yellowjacket, and gave the episode 4 out of 5 stars. Tom Jorgensen at IGN gave it a 7 out of 10 and was surprised to see a murder mystery in the MCU. He called it "Marvel's darkest divergence from canon yet" and found the deaths of Stark, Hulk, and Thor to be "surprisingly grim" but also believable since they used the struggles each hero was facing. He thought the episode needed more time and focus to best tell its mystery, but was positive about the reveal that Pym is the killer because he saw it as a logical progression from the character's depiction in Ant-Man. Jorgensen had mixed feelings about the voice acting, praising Jackson's "remarkably consistent" Fury and describing Wingert's Tony Stark as "perfectly serviceable", but questioning why Bell's recognizable voice was chosen over an actress who sounded closer to Johansson. He also felt Romanoff's characterization was more humorous than it was in the Phase One films, and likened Gregg's performance more to his appearance in the 1995-set Captain Marvel (2019) than his Phase One appearances. Matt Goldberg at Collider was relieved that the episode did not simply swap one character for another like the first two, and praised its "darkly comic tone" that played with the audience's expectations.

Rolling Stone's Alan Sepinwall found the episode to be less exciting than the first two episodes, both because it was an alternate storyline for "lesser MCU movies" and because the premise had a less clear "what if" scenario. Despite this, he was impressed by the episode's scale and thought the time with Fury "never feels wasted", adding that of the first three episodes this one felt the most like the What If comics. Angie Han of The Hollywood Reporter felt the episode had "less to offer in the way of emotional or thematic depth, and [could not] even scrape together a satisfying solution to the mystery it presents". The A.V. Club's Sam Barsanti was even more critical of the episode, giving it a "C+" and believing it was the weakest so far with "the loosest 'what if' premise". He was unaware that the Fury's Big Week premise already existed before this episode and had trouble believing that the events of The Incredible Hulk occurred during the same week as Iron Man 2 and Thor. He also described many of the episode's "whodunnit?" elements as "silly silly" rather than just 'What If...? silly', and felt they distracted from the story. Revealing the episode was centered on Hope van Dyne was "where it really started [to] crumble" for Barsanti, though he did enjoy everything after Pym is revealed to be the killer, including Douglas's performance, "Loki being Loki", and the tease of a future story with Captain America and Captain Marvel.

Like Barsanti, Adam Rosenberg at Mashable was also unaware of Fury's Big Week and discovered the comic after watching the episode. He questioned why the series would adapt the relatively-unknown comic when the first two episodes had focused on popular films, stating, "A cynic would tell you Marvel probably did it to drum up sales of [the comic]. A realist would say Fury's Big Week is simply a really cool and fun platform for a What If...? story". However, Rosenberg suggested that there was another intention from Marvel for featuring this story in the series, and began theorizing what this could mean in terms of the wider MCU and multiverse. Ethan Anderton at /Film believed the episode set up "some kind of epic culmination that will presumably create a narrative tie between the episodes", shifting away from the series' anthology, individual episode format.
