= What If...? season 2 =

What If...?
- Season 2
- Promotional poster
- Starring: Jeffrey Wright
- No. of episodes: 9

Release
- Original network: Disney+
- Original release: December 22 – December 30, 2023

Season chronology
- ← Previous; Season 1 Next → Season 3

The second season of the American animated anthology series What If...?, based on the Marvel Comics series of the same name, explores alternate timelines in the multiverse that show what would happen if major moments from the films of the Marvel Cinematic Universe (MCU) occurred differently. The season is produced by Marvel Studios Animation, with A. C. Bradley serving as head writer and Bryan Andrews primarily directing. Animation for the season is provided by Flying Bark Productions, Stellar Creative Lab, and SDFX Studios, with Scott Wright and Stephan Franck serving as head of animation.

Jeffrey Wright stars as the Watcher, who narrates the series, alongside numerous MCU film actors reprising their roles. Development of the season began by December 2019, with the season's scripts written between January and October 2020 in the middle of the COVID-19 pandemic. Bradley and Andrews were revealed to be returning in November 2021. The first season's head of animation Stephan Franck was revealed as another director by December 2023.

The second season debuted on December 22, 2023, on Disney+ and released each of its nine episodes daily until December 30, as part of Phase Five of the MCU. A third season was confirmed in July 2022.

== Episodes ==
No. overall	No. in season	Title	Directed by	Written by	Original release date
10	1	"What If... Nebula Joined the Nova Corps?"	Stephan Franck	Matthew Chauncey	December 22, 2023
Nova Prime Irani Rael recruits Nebula to join the Nova Corps following Ronan the Accuser's successful coup against Thanos. (Note: The coup is where the story diverges from the events of the film Guardians of the Galaxy (2014).) Five years later, after Xandar is sealed off from the universe to protect itself from Ronan's forces, Nebula discovers Yondu Udonta's body and receives orders from Irani to investigate. She learns that Yondu located the codes to open the planetary shield and enlists Kree soldier Yon-Rogg to infiltrate the Nova Corps mainframe to destroy them. Yon-Rogg betrays her, revealing that he and Irani Rael were working together to surrender Xandar to allow Ronan to invade. Nebula survives an execution attempt by Irani's men, subsequently enlisting casino owner Howard the Duck and his subordinates Groot, Miek, and Korg to stop her. During their fight, Nebula reveals she realized Irani's defection when she assigned the mission to her and altered the code so that the shield would close again as Ronan's ship, the Dark Aster, enters Xandar, destroying it and killing Ronan. Irani tries to escape, but falls to her death. The shield reopens as Nebula prepares to continue defending Xandar. Cast: Karen Gillan as Nebula, Jude Law as Yon-Rogg, Michael Rooker as Yondu Udonta, Seth Green as Howard the Duck, Taika Waititi as Korg, Peter Serafinowicz as Garthan Saal, Julianne Grossman as Irani Rael / Nova Prime, and Fred Tatasciore as Groot.
11	2	"What If... Peter Quill Attacked Earth's Mightiest Heroes?"	Bryan Andrews	Matthew Chauncey	December 23, 2023
In 1988, the Ravagers take Peter Quill to Ego, (Note: The choice to go through with the delivery is where the story diverges from the events of the film Guardians of the Galaxy (2014).) who urges him to help his expansion across the universe. Six months later, after ravaging several worlds, Quill returns to Earth. In response, Peggy Carter and Howard Stark recruit Bill Foster, King T'Chaka of Wakanda, Bucky Barnes, Dr. Wendy Lawson, and a reluctant Hank Pym, who brings his daughter Hope van Dyne along. After a scuffle on Coney Island, the team detains Quill with help from Thor. As the team discusses their next move, Van Dyne frees Quill, who travels to Missouri. As T'Chaka, Foster, and Thor aid Carter's forces in holding back Ego, Pym and Lawson encounter Quill visiting his mother's grave. A sympathetic Pym convinces him to stand against his father. Barnes—who is under the influence of Howard Stark’s orders—prepares to assassinate Quill until Stark reminds him of his best friend, Steve Rogers. As Ego overwhelms the heroes and attempts to obtain his seed, Pym and Quill arrive in time to stop him, with the latter using the seed to destroy Ego's avatar. The team, minus Barnes, celebrates their victory before setting out to confront Ego himself. Cast: Michael Douglas as Hank Pym / Ant-Man, Hayley Atwell as Peggy Carter, John Slattery as Howard Stark, Kurt Russell as Ego, Chris Hemsworth as Thor, Laurence Fishburne as Bill Foster / Goliath, Sebastian Stan as Bucky Barnes / Winter Soldier, Atandwa Kani as King T'Chaka / Black Panther, Madeleine McGraw as Hope van Dyne, Mace Montgomery Miskel as Peter Quill, Keri Tombazian as Mar-Vell / Wendy Lawson, and Gene Farber as Karpov.
12	3	"What If... Happy Hogan Saved Christmas?"	Bryan Andrews	A. C. Bradley & Matthew Chauncey	December 24, 2023
On Christmas Eve, Happy Hogan is assigned to oversee security at Avengers Tower for an annual holiday party until Justin Hammer and his henchmen Sergei and Rusty break out of prison and assault the Tower for Tony Stark's technology and a sample of Bruce Banner's blood. While attempting to secure the blood sample, Hogan is accidentally injected with it, causing him to gradually transform into a Hulk-like monster while retaining his intelligence. With the Avengers busy and Stark's A.I. J.A.R.V.I.S. inactive, Hogan contacts Darcy Lewis, who tries to find a new A.I. to reboot the tower's systems. However, she is taken hostage by Hammer's group, who hijack the Iron Legion and Stark's Hulkbuster armor. Once his transformation is complete, Hogan destroys the legion and defeats Hammer. While Hammer is taken back into custody, the Avengers return, praise Hogan for his efforts, and resume their Christmas party. Cast: Jon Favreau as Happy Hogan / "The Freak", Kat Dennings as Darcy Lewis, Cobie Smulders as Maria Hill, Sam Rockwell as Justin Hammer, Chris Hemsworth as Thor, Mark Ruffalo as Bruce Banner, Jeremy Renner as Clint Barton / Hawkeye, Mick Wingert as Tony Stark / Iron Man, Lake Bell as Natasha Romanoff / Black Widow, Josh Keaton as Steve Rogers / Captain America, Isaac Robinson-Smith as Sergei, Matthew Waterson as Rusty, and Ross Marquand as W.E.R.N.E.R.
13	4	"What If... Iron Man Crashed into the Grandmaster?"	Bryan Andrews	A. C. Bradley	December 25, 2023
In 2012, Tony Stark saves New York from the Chitauri by redirecting a nuclear missile towards their mothership. However, the wormhole he used closes before he can return to Earth, (Note: This event is where the story diverges from the events of the film The Avengers (2012).) causing him to crash-land on Sakaar, where he is forced to stay by its ruler, the Grandmaster. Stark interferes in a death race to save one of the racers, Korg, and encounters Gamora, who was sent by Thanos to kill Stark for stopping the Chitauri, before the Grandmaster's chief enforcer, Topaz, imprisons the pair. Upon learning Gamora's purpose and vowing to stop the Grandmaster, Stark escapes, recruits Korg and Valkyrie, builds a new Iron Man suit, and challenges the Grandmaster to a race for the title of Sakaar's ruler. Though the Grandmaster tries to cheat, Stark ultimately wins while Valkyrie defeats Topaz and melts the Grandmaster. As Valkyrie is crowned king of Sakaar, Stark convinces Gamora to forge her own path before joining her in leaving to confront and kill Thanos. In a mid-credits scene, the still-alive Grandmaster begs Topaz to collect his new puddle form. Cast: Mick Wingert as Tony Stark / Iron Man, Jeff Goldblum as Grandmaster, Tessa Thompson as Valkyrie, Taika Waititi as Korg, Rachel House as Topaz, Josh Brolin as Thanos, and Cynthia McWilliams as Gamora.
14	5	"What If... Captain Carter Fought the Hydra Stomper?"	Bryan Andrews	A. C. Bradley	December 26, 2023
Captain Peggy Carter and Natasha Romanoff find Steve Rogers inside the Hydra Stomper armor aboard the Lemurian Star, (Note: As depicted in the first season episode "What If... the Watcher Broke His Oath?".) but he attacks them. A briefing with Nick Fury leads Romanoff to deduce that Rogers, who went missing in 1953, was captured and brainwashed by the Red Room. Carter and Romanoff help Brock Rumlow protect Bucky Barnes from Rogers before incapacitating him and traveling to a secret hideout in Scotland, where they learn the suit is keeping Rogers alive, though each activation reduces his chances of survival. Rogers offers to help Carter dismantle the Red Room in the hopes of finding a cure before escorting her and Romanoff to a former KGB site. However, the group is ambushed by drones and Black Widow assassins controlled by the Red Room's leader, Melina Vostokoff, who reactivates Rogers' brainwashing. While Romanoff holds off Vostokoff's forces, Carter reaches out to Rogers, who sacrifices himself to destroy the Red Room. Amidst this, Romanoff uses her grappling hook to tie Vostokoff to Rogers' suit, killing her in the resulting explosion. As Carter tries to find Rogers, a portal takes her to a Renaissance-themed universe, where she encounters its variants of Fury and Wanda Maximoff. Cast: Samuel L. Jackson as Nick Fury, Hayley Atwell as Peggy Carter / Captain Carter, Lake Bell as Natasha Romanoff / Black Widow, Frank Grillo as Brock Rumlow, Josh Keaton as Steve Rogers / Hydra Stomper, Sebastian Stan as Bucky Barnes, Rachel Weisz as Melina Vostokoff, and Elizabeth Olsen as Wanda-Merlin.
15	6	"What If... Kahhori Reshaped the World?"	Bryan Andrews	Ryan Little	December 27, 2023
After Surtur destroys Asgard during Ragnarok earlier, the Tesseract crash-lands in a lake in the Haudenosaunee Confederacy in pre-colonial America, giving it magical properties. (Note: Odin being unable to place the Tesseract on Earth because of Ragnarok is where the story diverges from the franchise.) After numerous tribespeople disappear while interacting with it, it becomes known as the Forbidden Lake. In the late 15th century, young Mohawk siblings Kahhori and Wáhta, are hunted by Spanish Conquistadors, who ransacked their village in search of the Fountain of Youth. While hiding inside a cave, Wáhta is captured and Kahhori is shot, causing her to fall into the Forbidden Lake, which teleports her to another dimension, where she is nursed back to health by fellow Mohawk people. A villager named Atahraks explains that the missing tribespeople were teleported to the "Sky World", where they gained powers and immortality, but were unable to return home. As Kahhori familiarizes herself with her newfound powers, the Conquistadors enter the lake, believing it to be the Fountain, and invade the Sky World. Kahhori stops them and forces the portal from the sky to the ground and returns home. She and the villagers defeat the Conquistadors, rescue her people, and later force Queen Isabella to make peace. Soon after, Doctor Strange Supreme emerges from a separate portal and approaches Kahhori. Cast: Devery Jacobs as Kahhori, Kiawentiio as Wáhta, Jeremy White as Atahraks, Gabriel Romero as Rodrigo Alphonso Gonzolo, Benedict Cumberbatch as Doctor Strange Supreme, Carolina Ravassa as Queen Isabella of Spain, Clancy Brown as Surtur, and Jeff Bergman as Odin.
16	7	"What If... Hela Found the Ten Rings?"	Bryan Andrews	Matthew Chauncey	December 28, 2023
Growing weary of Hela's bloodlust in the Nine Realms, Odin banishes her to Earth and strips her powers by destroying Mjolnir and placing an enchantment on her crown. (Note: Odin's choice to banish Hela to Earth rather than imprisoning her is where the story diverges from the events of the film Thor: Ragnarok (2017).) Hela lands in medieval China and is confronted by the armies of Xu Wenwu. She attempts to retrieve the crown, but fails. Wenwu keeps Hela alive and tries to recruit her to his army, but she escapes after failing to steal his Ten Rings. She is guided by a Hundun to the realm of Ta Lo, where she convinces their leader Jiayi to let her join their cause. Jiayi teaches Hela martial arts after she recognizes her true desire for freedom from control. After Heimdall reports his failure to locate Hela, Odin visits Earth to battle Wenwu in retaliation. Hela joins Wenwu in fighting against Odin, ultimately winning and regaining her worthiness to wield her crown. Odin recognizes Hela's growth and submits Asgard's throne to her. Hela unites the armies of Asgard and Wenwu's Ten Rings organization and embarks on a journey to ensure freedom across the Nine Realms and beyond, coming to the rescue of Gamora's people as Thanos attacks them. (Note: As seen in a flashback in Avengers: Infinity War (2018).) Cast: Cate Blanchett as Hela, Jeff Bergman as Odin, Feodor Chin as Xu Wenwu, Lauren Tom as Jiayi, Idris Elba as Heimdall, Michael Hagiwara as Shunyuan, and Liv Zamora as Young Hela.
17	8	"What If... the Avengers Assembled in 1602?"	Bryan Andrews	A. C. Bradley & Ryan Little	December 29, 2023
After arriving in an Elizabethan era-themed universe, Captain Carter agrees to help Wanda Merlin and Sir Nicholas Fury stop an impending incursion. She saves Prince Loki from being pulled into a tear, but fails to save Queen Hela and is hunted by Sir Harold "The Happy" Hogan under King Thor's orders. Carter learns from the Watcher that the incursion is occurring due to the presence of the Forerunner, another time-displaced individual, and works with Tony Stark to build a device that can identify the Forerunner using the Time Stone in Thor's scepter. Stark suggests she work with outlaws Steve Rogers, Bucky Barnes, and Scott Lang to help steal it. Carter finds the group, but they are ambushed by Hogan. Carter gives herself up before freeing herself and a masked Bruce Banner. They meet with Stark and join Rogers' group in infiltrating Thor's court. With Wanda and Fury's help, the group retrieves the Time Stone for Stark's device, which identifies Rogers as the Forerunner, who had inadvertently created the temporal anomaly while battling Thanos. (Note: The creation of this anomaly is where the story diverges from the events of the film Avengers: Infinity War (2018).) Carter bids farewell to Rogers and returns him to his time, preventing the incursion, before she is met by Strange Supreme. Cast: Hayley Atwell as Peggy Carter / Captain Carter, Cate Blanchett as Queen Hela, Samuel L. Jackson as Sir Nicholas Fury, Elizabeth Olsen as Wanda Merlin, Chris Hemsworth as King Thor Odinson, Tom Hiddleston as Loki, Mark Ruffalo as Bruce Banner / Hulk, Jon Favreau as Sir Harold "The Happy" Hogan / "The Freak", Mick Wingert as Tony Stark, Josh Keaton as Steve Rogers / Rogers Hood, Paul Rudd as Scott Lang / Ant-Man, Sebastian Stan as Bucky Barnes, Benedict Cumberbatch as Doctor Strange Supreme, and Lake Bell as Natasha Romanoff / Black Widow.
18	9	"What If... Strange Supreme Intervened?"	Bryan Andrews	Matthew Chauncey	December 30, 2023
Strange Supreme takes Captain Carter to his Sanctum Infinitum, where he reveals that he has been capturing "universe-killers" to atone for his sins, and asks for her help in capturing an escaped variant who fled to a universe where Hydra used the Tesseract to destroy the world. Carter agrees and encounters Kahhori, who reveals that Strange has been capturing variants to feed to the Forge, a contraption he built to resurrect his lost universe. (Note: As depicted in the first season episode "What If... Doctor Strange Lost His Heart Instead of His Hands?") As Strange attempts to kill Kahhori, Carter frees his captives, allowing her and Kahhori to escape. Amidst the chaos, the pair encounter Black Panther Killmonger, whom Kahhori separates from his armor, allowing Carter to use his Infinity Stones. While the pair battle Strange at the Forge, the variants lend their weapons to the two women while Kahhori sends them home. Strange is taken over by his demonic self, though Carter separates them. As the Forge collapses, Strange sacrifices himself and his counterpart to it. The Watcher returns Kahhori home and brings Carter to Strange's restored universe, revealing he succeeded in resurrecting Christine Palmer, though he can never be reborn into it. Carter asks the Watcher to show her the multiverse before taking her home. Cast: Hayley Atwell as Peggy Carter / Captain Carter, Benedict Cumberbatch as Doctor Strange Supreme / Demon Strange, Devery Jacobs as Kahhori, Cate Blanchett as Hela, Feodor Chin as Xu Wenwu, Clancy Brown as Surtur, Josh Keaton as Steve Rogers, and Stanley Tucci as Abraham Erskine.

== Cast and characters ==
The series is narrated by Jeffrey Wright as the Watcher, a member of the alien Watcher race who observes the multiverse. Each episode features different versions of characters from the MCU films, with many actors reprising their roles for the series.

== Production ==
=== Development ===
In December 2019, Marvel Studios president Kevin Feige revealed that work had already begun on a second, 10-episode season of What If...?. However, because of the production delays caused by the COVID-19 pandemic during the first season, the first two seasons each consisted of nine episodes. Executive producer Brad Winderbaum explained that the additional, tenth episode of the first season, centered on versions of Tony Stark and Gamora first seen in the first-season finale, would not have been completed in time, and is included in the second season. The episodes are approximately 30 minutes in length. A. C. Bradley and Bryan Andrews return as head writer and lead director, respectively, with Andrews directing the majority of episodes and Stephan Franck, the first season's head of animation, directing the first episode. Executive producers for the season include Winderbaum, Feige, Louis D'Esposito, Victoria Alonso, Andrews, and Bradley. The final episode of the season introduced an updated Marvel Studios logo that replaced the live-action footage with animated images from What If...?.

=== Writing ===
Matthew Chauncey and Ryan Little served as writers on the season, alongside Bradley. Writing for the season's episodes took place between January and October 2020 during the height of the COVID-19 pandemic, with the story arcs conceived during brainstorming sessions in 2019. Because of the long-lead production for animation, there was not an opportunity for audience reactions to the first season to impact the creatives' work on the second season. Bradley said that since "it felt like the world was already ending" when writing the season, they tried to bring levity to the story for the season to make it "an escape and a fun release"; antithesis of this, she had written a "very dark" episode with Peter Parker / Spider-Man inspired by the film Children of Men (2006) that did not proceed. Some of the 20 concepts not chosen from the first season's initial 30 appear in the second, with Winderbaum noting that since those were initially conceived, "the world's changed and the fictional Marvel Universe has changed", which would allow for new ideas to be presented as well. Andrews said that following the first season, in which the "what if" concept were only small changes from what was established, further seasons were able to "expand out" beyond these small moments and "get a little bit wackier". Bradley said the season would focus more on revealing new sides to MCU characters than the "big, let's end the world"-style stories from the first season. Characters introduced in Phase Four of the MCU also featured in the season, which shows alternate storylines of Phase Four films.

Some of the storyline elements from the first season with Captain Carter, Doctor Strange Supreme and the Watcher are continued in this season. While development of the second season was beginning, Captain Carter became the character that the writers wanted to continue to revisit every season to continue her story after she had "bubbled up" in the first season as a prominent character. Once a Captain Carter arc had been decided, the creatives kept returning to the idea of having Doctor Strange Supreme return as the season's villain; early discussions for the season's villain had centered on it being the Grandmaster, exploring the idea that he acquired the Infinity Gauntlet. For the Watcher, the season goes "a little deeper" into what makes him "tick", and how he would reckon with his choices from the first season. Chauncey explained that fate had made Captain Carter and the Watcher "lone warriors" and described them as mirrors for each other, highlighting how the Watcher watches and engages with Captain Carter throughout her life in the season. Discussing the friendship between the Watcher and Captain Carter, Bradley said that Carter does not back down from him and is able to "see the bigger picture" while trying to do what is right and intervening in events that the Watcher cannot.

The episodes once again have various tones and are set in different genres, including a Nebula episode that is a detective story inspired by the film noir genre, such as Blade Runner (1982), that is one of the "darker" episodes of the season; one where the Avengers were formed in the 1980s and is inspired by the action films of that era; a holiday-themed episode influenced by the film Die Hard (1988); an Odyssey homage that mixes in racing elements from films such as Death Race 2000 (1975) and Mad Max: Fury Road (2015); and spy elements for Captain Carter's episode that continues from the mid-credits scene in "What If... the Watcher Broke His Oath?". The season also includes episodes that are a "redemption story" for Hela, and one that is a loose adaptation of the Marvel 1602 (2003) comic book limited series. The sixth episode introduces an original MCU character named Kahhori, a young Mohawk woman in an alternate timeline who seeks to discover her new-found powers after the Tesseract crash-lands in the Haudenosaunee Confederacy in pre-colonial America where European colonization has not occurred. The creatives worked with members of the Mohawk Nation and Disney's diversity department, which brought in consultants from the Smithsonian Institution, to ensure cultural accuracy for its representation of Indigenous Americans when creating the character, setting, design, story, and music. The episode is presented in the Mohawk language with English subtitles as well as Spanish.

A Red Guardian/Winter Soldier-centered episode written by Bradley was intended for the second season, but was later moved to the third. Other episodes considered during the season's development included a musical, with four concepts that "could have gone musical one way or another"; Pet Avengers; and a pirate themed one, with Andrews explaining it would have focused on Crossbones as a swashbuckler who considers leaving that life.

=== Casting and voice recording ===
Jeffrey Wright returns to narrate the series as the Watcher. Marvel's plan for the series was to have actors who portray characters in the MCU films reprise their roles in What If...?, with over 30 doing so for the season. These include: Karen Gillan as Nebula, Jude Law as Yon-Rogg, Michael Rooker as Yondu Udonta, Seth Green as Howard the Duck, Taika Waititi as Korg, Peter Serafinowicz as Garthan Saal, Michael Douglas as Hank Pym / Ant-Man, Hayley Atwell as Peggy Carter and Captain Carter, John Slattery as Howard Stark, Kurt Russell as Ego, Chris Hemsworth as Thor, Laurence Fishburne as Bill Foster / Goliath, Sebastian Stan as Bucky Barnes / The Winter Soldier, Atandwa Kani as King T'Chaka / Black Panther, Madeleine McGraw as young Hope van Dyne, Gene Farber as Karpov, Jon Favreau as Happy Hogan / "The Freak", Kat Dennings as Darcy Lewis, Cobie Smulders as Maria Hill, Sam Rockwell as Justin Hammer, Mark Ruffalo as Bruce Banner, Jeremy Renner as Clint Barton / Hawkeye, Jeff Goldblum as the Grandmaster, Tessa Thompson as Valkyrie, Rachel House as Topaz, Josh Brolin as Thanos, Samuel L. Jackson as Nick Fury, Frank Grillo as Brock Rumlow, Rachel Weisz as Melina Vostokoff, Elizabeth Olsen as Wanda-Merlin, Benedict Cumberbatch as Doctor Strange Supreme, Clancy Brown as Surtur, Cate Blanchett as Hela, Idris Elba as Heimdall, Tom Hiddleston as Loki, Paul Rudd as Scott Lang / Ant-Man, and Stanley Tucci as Abraham Erskine. Chauncey stated that each of the returning actors have such a knowledge of their characters, they had "pinpoint accuracy that allowed them to drop right into whatever timeline" of the episode and were able to imbue subtle changes as necessary for the scenarios.

Several characters in the season are voiced by different actors than those who portrayed them in MCU films. Reprising their roles from the first season include: Mick Wingert as Tony Stark / Iron Man; Lake Bell as Natasha Romanoff / Black Widow; Josh Keaton as Steve Rogers / Captain America, the Hydra Stomper, and Rogers Hood; and Cynthia McWilliams as Gamora. Julianne Grossman voices Nova Prime Irani Rael, replacing Glenn Close; Fred Tatasciore voices Groot, replacing Vin Diesel; Mace Montgomery Miskel voices young Peter Quill, replacing Wyatt Oleff; Keri Tombazian voices Wendy Lawson / Mar-Vell, replacing Annette Bening; Jeff Bergman voices Odin, replacing Anthony Hopkins; and Feodor Chin voices Xu Wenwu, replacing Tony Leung.

Characters introduced in the season include Isaac Robinson-Smith as Sergei; Matthew Waterson as Rusty; Ross Marquand as W.E.R.N.E.R.; Devery Jacobs as Kahhori, a young Mohawk woman who is an original MCU character; Jacobs also portrays Bonnie in Marvel Studios' live-action miniseries Echo (2024), which she called a "coincidence" that she was part of two Marvel Studios projects and noting the two characters were not related; Kiawentiio as Wáhta; Jeremy White as Atahraks; Gabriel Romero as Rodrigo Alphonso Gonzolo; Carolina Ravassa as Queen Isabella of Spain; Lauren Tom as Jiayi; Michael Hagiwara as Shunyuan; and Liv Zamora as young Hela.

Wright enjoyed being able to see how his performance played with animation for the first-season episodes while recording for this season, allowing him to make some adjustments to his performance such as adding "a bit more mystery to the voice and a bit more distance" to further the notion that the Watcher is "not entirely present". He also rerecorded some of his performance for the season after hearing his initial recordings, believing he had "been a bit distracted" and the tone of his voice was off. In January 2021, Grillo revealed that he had to return the following month to record more episodes as Rumlow.

=== Animation ===
Scott Wright serves as animation supervisor for the majority of the season, with the first season's head of animation Franck joining Wright on the fourth episode, and serving as sole supervisor on the fifth. Flying Bark Productions worked on four episodes, Stellar Creative Lab worked on two, and SDFX Studios worked on three.

=== Music ===
Laura Karpman returned from the first season as a composer, and was joined by her wife Nora Kroll-Rosenbaum, who previously conducted Karpman's score for The Marvels (2023). They completed work on the season's score by the start of December 2023. The Kahhori episode features traditional Mohawk music. A five-track EP for the third episode, "What If... Happy Hogan Saved Christmas?", was released digitally on December 15, 2023. A soundtrack album for the season featuring selections of Karpman and Kroll-Rosenbaum's score was released digitally by Hollywood Records and Marvel Music on January 5, 2024.

What If...?: Season 2 (Original Soundtrack)
No.	Title	Length
1.	"What If...Super Nova Nebula"	1:46
2.	"What If...Peter Quill"	3:56
3.	"What If...Christmas"	4:04
4.	"What If...Sakaar Iron Man"	3:06
5.	"What If...Captain Carter"	3:07
6.	"What If...Kahhori"	2:30
7.	"What If...Hela"	4:36
8.	"What If...1602"	3:13
9.	"What If...Strange Supreme"	3:56
10.	"What If...End Credits"	2:11
Total length:		32:00

== Marketing ==
The season was discussed during Marvel Studios' animation panel at the 2022 San Diego Comic-Con, where "What If... Captain Carter Fought the Hydra Stomper?" was shown, then expected to be the season's first episode. A trailer for the second season was released on November 15, 2023. Bradley Russell at Total Film felt the season was "serving up the weirdest, wildest side to the MCU yet". Marvel created an Advent calendar-style website, "The Watcher's Nine Days of What If...?", which featured daily preview clips for each episode as well as a preview of the third season. At the Consumer Electronics Show in January 2023, Samsung Electronics aired an advertisement at the Sphere for its upcoming Galaxy Unpacked event featuring characters from What If...?'s second season.

== Release ==
The second season premiered on Disney+ on December 22, 2023, and released its nine episodes daily until December 30. It was the first Marvel Studios television project to release new episodes daily. It was originally announced to be releasing in early 2023, but by February 2023 it was reportedly unlikely to premiere that year as Disney and Marvel Studios were re-evaluating their content output. The late December 2023 release date was announced in September. A screening of the first and third episodes—"What If... Nebula Joined the Nova Corps?" and "What If... Happy Hogan Saved Christmas?"—and a Q&A with the creatives occurred at the Walt Disney Studios lot in Burbank, California on December 11, 2023. The season is part of Phase Five of the MCU.

== Reception ==
=== Critical response ===
The second season has an 89% approval rating on Rotten Tomatoes, based on 27 reviews, with an average rating of 7.7/10. The website's critics consensus states, "In its superlative sophomore season, What If...? reaffirms its status as one of the most consistently creative outposts in the sprawling MCU." At Metacritic, which assigns a weighted average rating, the second season has received an average score of 79 out of 100, based on 7 critics, indicating "generally favorable".

=== Accolades ===
For the 51st Annie Awards, "What If... Kahhori Reshaped the World?" was nominated for Outstanding Achievement for Animated Effects in an Animated Television/Broadcast Production, while "What If... Nebula Joined the Nova Corps?" was nominated for Outstanding Achievement for Production Design in an Animated Television / Broadcast Production. The episode "What If... Hela Found the Ten Rings?" was nominated for Children's Teleplay at the 2024 Humanitas Prize.
