= What If... Doctor Strange Lost His Heart Instead of His Hands? =

- What If...? episode
- Promotional poster
- Episode no.: Season 1 Episode 4
- Directed by: Bryan Andrews
- Written by: A. C. Bradley
- Editing by: Joel Fisher
- Original release date: September 1, 2021
- Running time: 36 minutes

Cast
- Benedict Cumberbatch as Dr. Stephen Strange and Doctor Strange Supreme; Rachel McAdams as Christine Palmer; Benedict Wong as Wong; Tilda Swinton as the Ancient One; Ike Amadi as O'Bengh; Leslie Bibb as Christine Everhart

Episode chronology
← Previous "What If... the World Lost Its Mightiest Heroes?"	Next → "What If... Zombies?!"
- What If...? season 1

"What If... Doctor Strange Lost His Heart Instead of His Hands?" is the fourth episode of the first season of the American animated television series What If...?, based on the Marvel Comics series of the same name. It explores what would happen if the events of the Marvel Cinematic Universe (MCU) film Doctor Strange (2016) occurred differently, with Dr. Stephen Strange's girlfriend Christine Palmer dying rather than Strange losing the use of his hands. The episode was written by head writer A. C. Bradley and directed by Bryan Andrews.

Jeffrey Wright narrates the series as the Watcher, with this episode also starring the voices of Benedict Cumberbatch (Strange), Rachel McAdams (Palmer), Benedict Wong, Tilda Swinton, Ike Amadi, and Leslie Bibb. The series began development by September 2018, with Andrews and Bradley joining soon after, and many actors expected to reprise their roles from the MCU films. The episode tells a tragic love story in which Strange attempts to use magic to prevent Palmer's death. Animation for the episode was provided by Flying Bark Productions, with Stephan Franck serving as head of animation.

"What If... Doctor Strange Lost His Heart Instead of His Hands?" was released on Disney+ on September 1, 2021. Critics praised the episode's dark storyline and ending, but gave mixed reviews for its visuals and Palmer's fridging storyline.

== Plot ==
After successfully completing a rare hemispherectomy, (Note: This is when the story diverges from the events of the film Doctor Strange (2016).) surgeon Dr. Stephen Strange and his girlfriend Dr. Christine Palmer drive to a celebration party in his honor. However, they get into a car crash that kills Palmer. A grieving Strange seeks answers in Kamar-Taj, where he becomes a Master of the Mystic Arts. While studying the Eye of Agamotto, Strange learns that it can manipulate time, but is warned by the Ancient One and Wong not to do so as it could damage the fabric of reality.

Two years after Palmer's death, Strange returns to that night using the Eye, but is unable to save her no matter how he alters events. The Ancient One explains that averting Palmer's death would mean he never became a sorcerer, creating a universe-destroying paradox as the event is an "absolute point" in time. Strange refuses to listen and uses the Eye to escape to the Lost Library of Cagliostro. He meets librarian O'Bengh and learns he can amass enough power to break an absolute point by absorbing magical beings.

After centuries of doing so, Strange is told by a dying O'Bengh that he is still not powerful enough because he is only half of himself. He soon learns that when he escaped the Ancient One, she used the power of the Dark Dimension to split him into two alternate versions, with him becoming "Strange Supreme" and the other going on to accept Palmer's death, in the hopes that the latter Strange can defeat the former.

After a battle between the two, Strange Supreme overpowers and absorbs his counterpart. He then uses his enhanced powers to reverse Palmer's death, but his monstrous appearance repulses her. As the paradox begins tearing reality apart and his surroundings collapse, Strange Supreme begs the Watcher for help. The latter refuses to interfere and the universe is destroyed. While Strange preserves a small pocket of it, Palmer disintegrates, leaving a regretful Strange Supreme to grieve alone.

== Production ==
=== Development ===
External videos
- What If... Doctor Strange Lost His Heart Instead of His Hands? | Marvel Studios' What If...? | Disney+, a promotional video introducing the episode's "what if" concept with narration by Jeffrey Wright as the Watcher, video from the What If...? Twitter account

By September 2018, Marvel Studios was developing an animated anthology series based on the What If...? comic books, which would explore how the Marvel Cinematic Universe (MCU) films would be altered if certain events occurred differently. Head writer A. C. Bradley joined the project in October 2018, with director Bryan Andrews meeting Marvel Studios executive Brad Winderbaum about the project as early as 2018; Bradley and Andrews' involvement was announced in August 2019. They executive produce alongside Winderbaum, Kevin Feige, Louis D'Esposito, and Victoria Alonso. Bradley wrote the fourth episode, titled "What If... Doctor Strange Lost His Heart Instead of His Hands?", which features an alternate storyline of the film Doctor Strange (2016). "What If... Doctor Strange Lost His Heart Instead of His Hands?" was released on Disney+ on September 1, 2021.

=== Writing ===
The episode was written in February 2019. In the episode's alternate storyline, a car crash results in Dr. Stephen Strange's girlfriend Christine Palmer dying rather than Strange losing the use of his hands, creating a "dark... tragic love story". The creative team of Doctor Strange in the Multiverse of Madness (2022) were interested in What If...?'s take on Strange during that film's development. The episode adapts part of the H.G. Wells novel The Time Machine (1895), with Strange making multiple attempts to go back in time and save Palmer only for her to always die. Bradley was scared to begin work on the episode because of its heavy themes, including tragedy and "why does loss hurt so much", but she ultimately found writing the episode to be a rewarding experience because it "all comes down to love. Only the things we love can hurt us". Bradley drew from a personal loss of her older cousin, using her desire to go back in time to save him as the basis for Strange wanting to save Palmer, as well as what it means to have grief. She also called it the "most human" episode of the season. Andrews felt the episode went in a different direction to others of the series that he believed animation should cover more often, and believed the audience would be shocked by the episode's ending.

The Watcher considers intervening to prevent Strange from endangering his whole reality, taking a more active role than in previous episodes, which actor Jeffrey Wright said was a "shift in attitude ... purpose and intent" for him, becoming "less disembodied". He added that the Watcher took particular interest in this story because he and Doctor Strange have a "common perspective on certain things". Wright also explained that the Watcher is "not a voyeur for voyeurism's sake, he is in some ways made up of these characters. Without them, what does he watch? He's profoundly compelled by them, and maybe there's only so much he can take". Wright was moved by the episode and believed its lessons were "really riveting and relevant", while calling the premise of the episode "timeless" since all people have had moments when they wish they could undo certain events. The episode refers to fixed points in time as "absolute points", which had previously been established as a "nexus point" in the first season of Loki (2021). Bradley conceded that "nexus point" should have been used in the episode, however, the scripts for Loki were not yet created when the episode had completed its animatics.

=== Casting ===
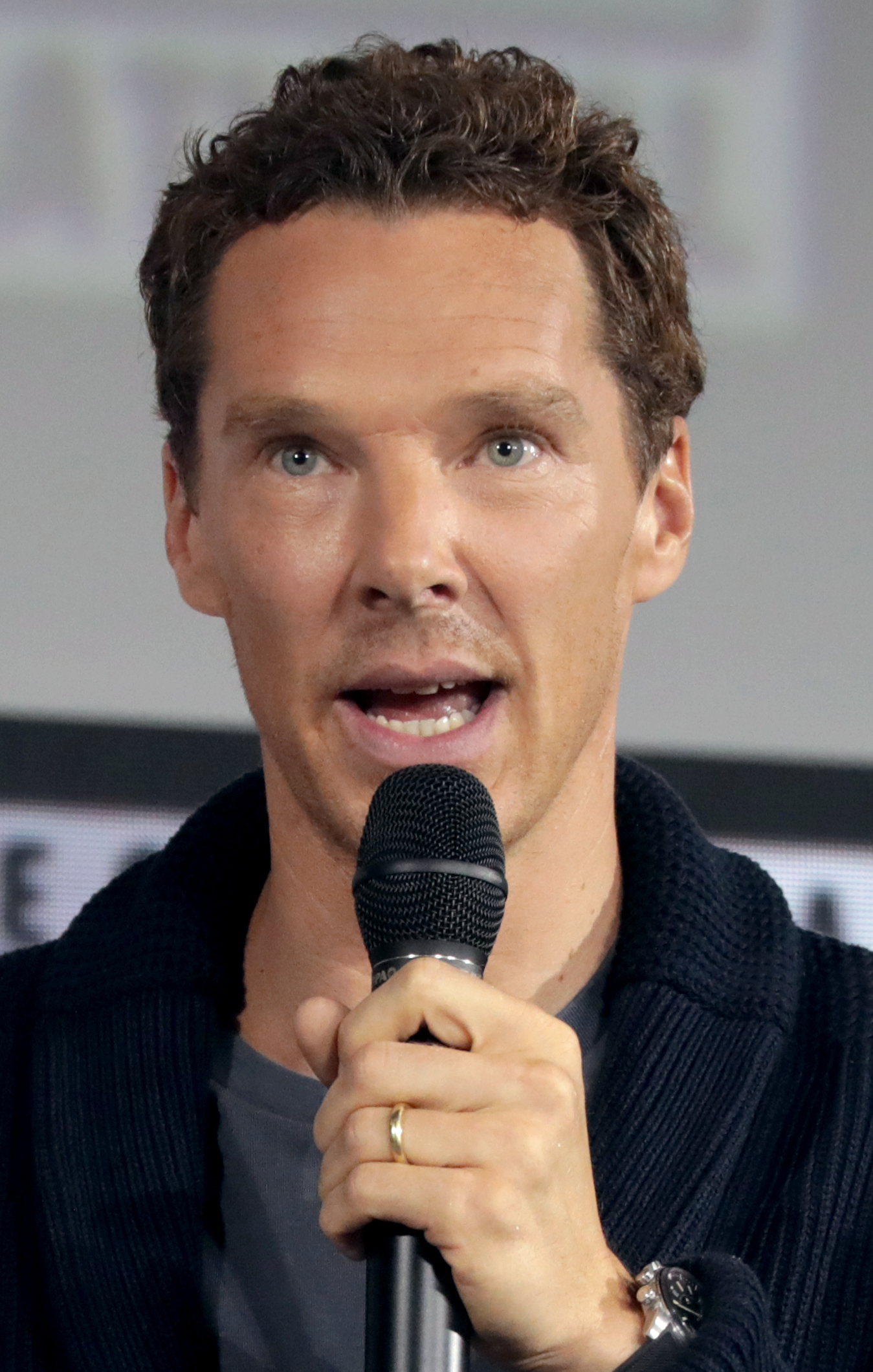
Benedict Cumberbatch reprises his role as Stephen Strange in the episode

Jeffrey Wright narrates the episode as the Watcher, with Marvel planning to have other characters in the series voiced by the actors who portrayed them in the MCU films. The episode stars returning Doctor Strange actors Benedict Cumberbatch as Dr. Stephen Strange as well as his evil counterpart which is referred to as Doctor Strange Supreme, Rachel McAdams as Christine Palmer, Benedict Wong as Wong, and Tilda Swinton as the Ancient One. Leslie Bibb reprises her role of Christine Everhart from previous MCU media and Ike Amadi also stars in the episode as O'Bengh, which is a pseudonym used by the sorcerer Cagliostro in Marvel Comics. Dormammu also appears in a non-speaking role.

=== Animation ===
Animation for the episode was provided by Flying Bark Productions, with Stephan Franck serving as head of animation. Andrews developed the series' cel-shaded animation style with Ryan Meinerding, the head of visual development at Marvel Studios. Though the series has a consistent art style, elements such as the camera and color palette differ between episodes. After an early screening of the episode before animation work began, Feige said "It's amazing... I don't know how we're going to pull this off with the animation, but keep pushing it." Concept art for the episode is included during the end credits and was released online by Marvel following the episode's premiere.

When designing an evil version of Doctor Strange, Meinerding looked to the idea that he had been altered by the mystical creatures he was absorbing and designed a "very odd-looking, malformed person". The creatives decided that they still wanted the character to be recognizable as Strange, so Meinerding instead went with a more human version of the character that is gaunt, with a darker costume, paler skin, "sharper and more dangerous" hair and beard, and dark circles under his eyes. Meinerding described this as a "classic" evil character look. Another element that was adjusted is the character's cape and collar, which is bigger to give the two versions of Strange a distinctive silhouette. The more monstrous designs that Meinerding originally did were brought back for the episode's ending. This look incorporates the different creatures that appear in the episode, which were based on ideas from Andrews, Bradley, and storyboard artist Aram Sarkisian rather than any existing Marvel Comics characters. They designed around 20 different creatures for the episode, and wanted the looks to both be interesting on their own as well as in the ways that they could temporarily merge with Strange as he absorbs them. The design team went through more iterations of Doctor Strange than many other characters for the series as they worked out how evil he needed to be portrayed and how monstrous his final form should be, as well as the other variations such as the character wearing a tux, injured versions, and 10 to 15 variations of him absorbing different creatures.

One of the most complex environments to create for production designer Paul Lasaine and his team was the room where Strange absorbs the creatures. It is meant to be the same main library room that is seen earlier in the episode, and they initially planned to use the same space with the lighting turned down, but the way the shots were framed for the sequence meant they would have to create 60 or 70 different backgrounds for the scene. Instead, they created a new "big black nothing" location and painted six or seven columns that they could then move around the scene depending on the angle of the shot. Another difficult sequence was the abstract backgrounds required when Strange sees an illusion of Palmer near the end of the climactic fight, which was added on the suggestion of editors Joel and Graham Fisher. The fight itself was developed by Andrews and Sarkisian and was described by the editors as "insane action" and "phenomenal stuff", but they felt it would detract from the story if the characters just fought until one of them won. They felt that adding a "final temptation moment" for the good Strange where he considers joining Strange Supreme to save Palmer would "reestablish the emotional reason for why this is happening, and what the stakes are". In the episode's original script, the good Strange suffered a much more gruesome death at the hands of Strange Supreme by getting beaten to death with the Eye of Agamotto. During storyboarding, Andrews and Sarkisian decided to make the scene more fantastical and visual instead of "horrifically violent". When Strange Supreme wins and changes the past, the universe begins to collapse. Franck described this as an "abstract environment where you don't have anything that you can recognize to orient you, and it's purely relying on the aesthetic and shape language". The animators used comic book artist Jack Kirby's distinct Kirby Krackle art style which is rarely seen in film and television to depict the negative space of the universe dissolving around him with a field of black.

Discussing the most challenging aspects of animating the series, Franck said nuanced facial expressions were at one end of that spectrum and gave this episode's conversations between Strange and Palmer in the car as an example. He said, "There's stuff [Strange] wants to say, but he can't say, or stuff he's willing to say, but she can't understand. All those layers of subtlety between text, subtext, and how deep it's buried" had to be conveyed. Bradley and Andrews wanted to push how cinematic the series could be with these facial expressions to match with the voice acting, and Andrews felt this episode in particular was a "tour de force". Bradley felt it had "beautiful imagery, some amazing action and hopefully a few good twists". Doctor Strange director Scott Derrickson was shown an early cut of the episode and described it as "terrific".

=== Music ===
Composer Laura Karpman combined elements of existing MCU scores with original music for the series, specifically referencing elements of Michael Giacchino's Doctor Strange score for this episode. Karpman mostly just copied Giacchino's use of the harpsichord because the majority of the episode's story is separate from the events of the film. She tried to use music to represent the repetitive story, which he called "sad and strange and tragic", by creating a four chord piano motif that is reprised with each repetition in the episode's story. It grows musically each time, with additional instrumentation, action music, and the Watcher's theme layered over it. A soundtrack for the episode was released digitally by Marvel Music and Hollywood Records on September 3, 2021, featuring Karpman's score.

What If... Doctor Strange Lost His Heart Instead of His Hands? (Original Soundtrack)
No.	Title	Length
1.	"The Absolute Point"	2:12
2.	"Evening Handsome"	1:44
3.	"Something Reckless"	0:57
4.	"Not Again"	4:34
5.	"No Door"	1:18
6.	"Maybe Nowhere"	1:49
7.	"The Wrong Path"	0:56
8.	"Absorption"	2:45
9.	"Half a Man"	1:11
10.	"Both Sides"	2:47
11.	"When Are You?"	0:56
12.	"I Am You"	1:08
13.	"Whole Again"	2:42
14.	"Crème Brûlée"	2:25
15.	"Sorry"	2:45
Total length:		30:09

== Marketing ==
After the episode's release, Marvel released a poster for the episode, featuring Doctor Strange Supreme and a quote from the episode. Marvel also announced merchandise inspired by the episode as part of its weekly "Marvel Must Haves" promotion for each episode of the series, including apparel, accessories, Funko Pops, and Marvel Legends figures based on Strange Supreme.

== Reception ==
The review aggregator website Rotten Tomatoes reported a 100% approval rating with an average score of 8.5/10 based on 5 reviews.

Tom Jorgensen gave the episode 8 out of 10 for IGN, calling it "the most haunting episode" of the series so far and an "effective cautionary tale about what loss can do to a person". He felt the darker direction of the episode best suited the series, and praised how the episode used Palmer's unpreventable death to represent "the effects of tragedy, of loss so painful we'd unmake the world to reverse it". Jorgensen also noted the Gothic horror elements in the episode, with Strange evoking both Dr. Jekyll and Victor Frankenstein. He criticized the decision to create two versions of Strange, feeling it was an unnecessary complication that existed just so the characters could fight at the end, and felt the fight itself did not feel fresh since it followed the common MCU trope of a hero fighting another version of themselves. Despite that, he praised the episode for "sticking the landing" and noted the ending as one of the darkest moments in the MCU. Sam Barsanti of The A.V. Club was also disappointed with the fight between Strange and Strange Supreme, calling it "a little Dragon Ball-y in a dull way" especially when compared to the visuals of Doctor Strange. Barsanti did praise the episode's "what if" scenario and dark ending, believing they were both executed more successfully than in the previous episode, and gave "What If... Doctor Strange Lost His Heart Instead of His Hands?" a "B".

Digital Spy's David Opie said the episode was "easily the best and most affecting" of the series yet, with Marvel Studios' darkest ending since Avengers: Infinity War (2018). Amon Warmann at Yahoo! News thought the ending was even better than Infinity War's, believing that film had been undermined by Marvel's plans for future MCU films while the episode was a self-contained story with an ending that does not need to be undone. He praised the "relatable and heartbreaking" montage of Palmer's deaths, including Karpman's score for the sequence, and was very positive about the episode's visuals: he described the sequence where Strange Supreme absorbs the creatures as "appropriately nightmarish", and his high point of the episode was the fight between Strange and Strange Supreme which he compared to the fight between Strange and Thanos in Infinity War and described as "visually stunning, inventive, and fun to watch". Warmann thought the episode needed more time to sell Strange Supreme's turn to evil, despite Cumberbatch's performance which he felt was the strongest of the series' returning MCU actors so far. Rosie Knight of Den of Geek gave the episode 3.5 out of 5 stars, calling it "a ton of cosmic fun" and highlighting the sequences where Strange Supreme absorbs the creatures and where Strange's Cloak of Levitation battles with Strange Supreme's cloak.

Despite appreciating the way Palmer's death is used in the episode, Jorgensen did think McAdams had a "thankless role as little more than the source of Strange's grief". Warmann also felt the storyline worked for the episode despite Palmer being portrayed as "little more than the object of Strange's affection". After McAdams also had a small role in Doctor Strange, Warmann felt Marvel needed to make up for these by giving her a larger role in a future film or What If...? episode. Knight and Barsanti both said Palmer's storyline was an example of fridging, as did Rachel Leishman of The Mary Sue who criticized the continued use of the trope but did enjoy the way this episode used it as the catalyst for Strange Supreme becoming a villain and exposing the character's "selfish tendencies". She compared Strange Supreme's arc in the episode to Wilson Fisk / Kingpin's arc in Spider-Man: Into the Spider-Verse (2018), and appreciated that the good version of Strange in the episode is depicted as accepting the past and focusing on the future.

Kris Naudus at Engadget discussed the return of the tentacled monster from the series premiere in this episode, calling it an example of an "underlying sense of continuity [that] has started to develop" within the series. She also compared the way that the episode played with the series' premise by having the Watcher talk with Strange Supreme to The Twilight Zone episode "A World of His Own". Jorgensen felt it was an interesting development for the series and the Watcher to have him actively ignore a "character in need" as he does with Strange Supreme. Naudus and Barsanti both also noted the expansion of the series' time travel logic to include absolute points in time, a concept that the time travel series Doctor Who is known for. Opie speculated that the events of the episode could have an impact on the upcoming films Spider-Man: No Way Home (2021) and Doctor Strange in the Multiverse of Madness, either by having Strange Supreme appear in those films or by having a similar threat of the universe ending play into their stories.

Doctor Strange writer C. Robert Cargill praised the episode and said it was a career highlight to see a What If...? episode based on a film he had written.

=== Accolades ===
Mac Smith, Bill Rudolph, Alyssa Nevarez, Cheryl Nardi, Anele Onyekwere, Tom Kramer, John Roesch and Shelley Roden were nominated for Outstanding Achievement in Sound Editing – Non-Theatrical Animation at the 2022 Golden Reel Awards. The episode was nominated for Outstanding Animated Program at the 74th Primetime Creative Arts Emmy Awards. This episode was chosen as the series' submission for the Emmys because the creators felt it was a "very strong episode" that had a more emotional core and darker ending than the others, as well as for Cumberbatch's performance.
