= Wong (Marvel Cinematic Universe) =

Marvel Cinematic Universe character

- Marvel Cinematic Universe character
- Benedict Wong as Wong in She-Hulk: Attorney at Law (2022).
- First appearance: Doctor Strange (2016)
- Based on: Wong by: Steve Ditko; Stan Lee
- Adapted by: Jon Spaihts; Scott Derrickson; C. Robert Cargill
- Portrayed by: Benedict Wong
- Voiced by: Benedict Wong (What If...? "What If... Doctor Strange Lost His Heart Instead of His Hands?"); David Chen (What If...? "What If... the Emergence Destroyed the Earth?")

In-universe information
- Title: Sorcerer Supreme
- Occupation: Sorcerer
- Affiliation: Masters of the Mystic Arts

Wong is a fictional character in the Marvel Cinematic Universe (MCU) film franchise, based on the Marvel Comics character of the same name and portrayed by Benedict Wong. In the franchise, Wong is depicted as Dr. Stephen Strange's friend and fellow sorcerer, being a member of the Masters of the Mystic Arts.

He is also granted the position of Sorcerer Supreme, succeeding the Ancient One, when Strange disappears in The Blip and which remains after his return, joining the Avengers to participate in the battles against Thanos. He is seen fighting underground until he meets Shang-Chi who tells him about the powers of the Ten Rings. He meets Peter Parker/Spider-Man after his identity was revealed to the world by Mysterio. He also joins forces with Strange to protect America Chavez, who can travel to the multiverse, from a Darkhold-corrupted Wanda Maximoff, and even receives help from lawyer Jennifer Walters on some legal issues.

As of 2025, Wong has appeared in six films, as well as in the Disney+ television series She-Hulk: Attorney at Law (2022). Alternate versions of Wong also appear in the animated series What If...? (2021–2024) voiced by Wong in season 1, and David Chen in season 3.

== Fictional character biography ==
=== Mentor to Strange and resurrection ===
Prior to 2016, Wong becomes Kamar-Taj's librarian after the previous one was beheaded by Kaecilius. In 2016, he meets Dr. Stephen Strange while on the latter's journey to fix his hands, listening to the songs of Beyoncé after hearing Strange mention her. A few months later in 2017, he is killed while defending the Hong Kong Sanctum, but is revived by Strange using the Time Stone. After defeating Kaecilius and Dormammu, Strange takes residence in the New York Sanctum and continues his studies with Wong.

=== Infinity War and becoming Sorcerer Supreme ===
In 2018, Wong and Strange witness Bruce Banner crash-land into the Sanctum and learn about the coming threat. Wong then informs Banner and Tony Stark about the history of the Infinity Stones. Shortly, Ebony Maw and Cull Obsidian arrive in the city and battle Wong, Strange, and Stark, with Wong defeating Obsidian by sending him through a portal. With Strange kidnapped by Maw, Wong stays behind to guard the Sanctum. Wong later survives the Blip and becomes the next Sorcerer Supreme by default.

In 2023, Wong is called in by a restored Strange to get the other sorcerers, the restored Avengers, Guardians of the Galaxy, the Ravagers, and the armies of Wakanda and Asgard to defeat an alternate Thanos' army at the destroyed Avengers Compound. Shortly after, Wong attends Stark's funeral.

==== Fighting Abomination and meeting Shang-Chi ====
In 2024, in order to train as Sorcerer Supreme, Wong facilitates Emil Blonsky's prison escape and battles him in an underground fight club in Macau, while in his Abomination form by creating a portal through which Blonsky punches himself. Wong offers asylum at Kamar-Taj, but Blonsky decides to return to prison.

Later, Wong appears before Shang-Chi and Katy in a San Francisco restaurant and has them accompany him to Kamar-Taj, where he calls Banner and Carol Danvers via holographic projection. They learn that the Ten Rings are sending out a beacon to a location unknown. Afterward, Wong joins Shang-Chi and Katy to sing karaoke at a nightclub.

==== Vacation to Kamar-Taj ====
Later that year, Wong encounters Peter Parker, who came to the Sanctum to consult with Strange about making the world forget Quentin Beck's public revelation of his identity as Spider-Man. Strange proposes a memory spell, which Wong cautions to be dangerous, but does not stop Strange as Wong concedes that Parker had suffered a lot. Wong leaves for Kamar-Taj, not wishing in being involved further.

=== Fighting the Scarlet Witch ===
Short time later, Wong arrives to assist Strange in a fight against Gargantos, an inter-dimensional one-eyed creature. The two eventually kill the creature while saving a girl, who introduces herself as America Chavez. At a pizza parlor, Chavez explains she can travel through the multiverse and other creatures are after her power. Chavez takes Wong and Strange to the roof of a building to see the corpse of an alternate version of Strange who was killed by another creature. Afterwards, Wong takes her to Kamar-Taj. Later, Wong is met by Strange who tells him about his visit with Wanda Maximoff and learns she has been corrupted by the Darkhold. Wong then informs them about the history of the Scarlet Witch. Maximoff soon arrives and attacks Kamar-Taj, killing many sorcerers and leveling the place. During the attack, Chavez's powers are triggered and she and Strange escape in a portal, leaving Wong behind in Maximoff's captivity. Maximoff begins to conduct a Darkhold spell known as "dream walking", to find a version of herself with her kids across the multiverse and take over her body. After Sara, a sorceress, sacrifices herself to destroy the Darkhold and break the dream-walk, Maximoff forces Wong to lead her to Mount Wundagore, the source of the Darkhold's power and the location of a shrine to the Scarlet Witch, allowing her to reestablish the dream-walk. Wong, after having been thrown off the cliff, manages to get back up and witness a dream-walking Strange, who dream-walked into the corpse of his deceased counterpart. Together they try and stop Maximoff, but she overpowers them. However, once Maximoff is released from the corruption, she allows Wong and Chavez to go and decides to destroy the Darkhold in all universes. Wong then oversees the reconstruction of Kamar-Taj.

=== Legal problems ===
In 2025, Wong arrives in Los Angeles and meets with lawyer Jennifer Walters, who is representing Blonsky for parole, after footage of the fight between the pair was leaked and released. Wong confirms he broke Blonsky out of prison and attends his parole hearing as a witness; he departs after a parole board member states he committed a crime by facilitating a prisoner escape.

Later, Wong finds out about magician Donny Blaze who was misusing the magic he learned at Mystic Castle after Madisynn King accidentally ended up in Kamar-Taj where she spoiled an episode of The Sopranos for him. Walters is enlisted as his lawyer where he told her that Blaze was expelled from Kamar-Taj for unethical power use by bringing beer kegs and a fraternity brother to Kamar-Taj. This leads to Walters to lead a cease and desist case against Blaze and Mystic Castle's owner Cornelius P. Willows. King was used as a witness to corroborate Wong's claim. Judge Hanna states that she will take a week to render her verdict as King leaves with Wong and Walters while spoiling another episode of The Sopranos. During his next show, Blaze accidentally summons a swarm of demons into his magic show, causing Walters and Wong to help. Before Walters has Wong banish the final demon, she uses it to intimidate Blaze and Willows to follow the cease and desist order which they reluctantly do. Later, Wong and King watch This Is Us together in Kamar-Taj while discussing alcoholic drinks.

When Blonsky is sent back to prison, Wong again breaks him out and allows him to move into Kamar-Taj.

== Alternate versions ==
Alternate versions of Wong are seen in the Disney+ animated series What If...?, with Benedict Wong returning to voice the character.

=== Doctor Strange Supreme ===
In an alternate 2016, Wong opposes Doctor Strange Supreme's several attempts to save his girlfriend, Dr. Christine Palmer. Despite these efforts, Supreme's universe-destroying paradox occurs, consuming Wong. After the timeline is split, an earlier Wong and Strange attempt to stop Supreme, only to be consumed again.

=== Zombie outbreak ===
In an alternate 2018, zombified versions of Wong, Strange, and Tony Stark devour and infect Ebony Maw and Cull Obsidian. They attempt to eat Bruce Banner, but they are killed by Wasp while Banner is saved by Spider-Man.

=== Emergence ===
In an alternate universe, Wong survived the Emergence event of the Celestial Tiamut that destroyed Earth. He, along with Valkyrie, Okoye, Ying Nan, and others including Brock Rumlow formed an Alliance. They worked together against Quentin Beck, who formed an Iron Federation. They rescued Riri Williams from White Vision and took her to their base, the Titanic. However, it was compromised and invaded by White Vision and Wong and the others escaped. They went to confront Beck, but he and the others were killed following an attack by Beck's hologram technology.

== Concept and creation ==
The character is depicted in Marvel Comics as Doctor Strange's Asian, "tea-making manservant", a racial stereotype that Doctor Strange (2016) director Scott Derrickson did not want in the film, and so the character was not included in the film's script. After the non-Asian actress Tilda Swinton was cast as the other significant Asian character from the Doctor Strange comics, the Ancient One (who was rewritten as having "Celtic" ancestry), Derrickson felt obligated to find a way to include Wong in the film. The character as he ultimately appears is "completely subverted as a character and reworked into something that didn't fall into any of the stereotypes of the comics", which Derrickson was pleased gave an Asian character "a strong presence in the movie". Benedict Wong was also pleased with the changes made to the character, and described him as "a drill sergeant to Kamar-Taj" rather than a manservant. He does not practice martial arts in the film, avoiding another racial stereotype. Derrickson added that Wong would have "a strong presence" in the MCU moving forward.

== Appearances ==
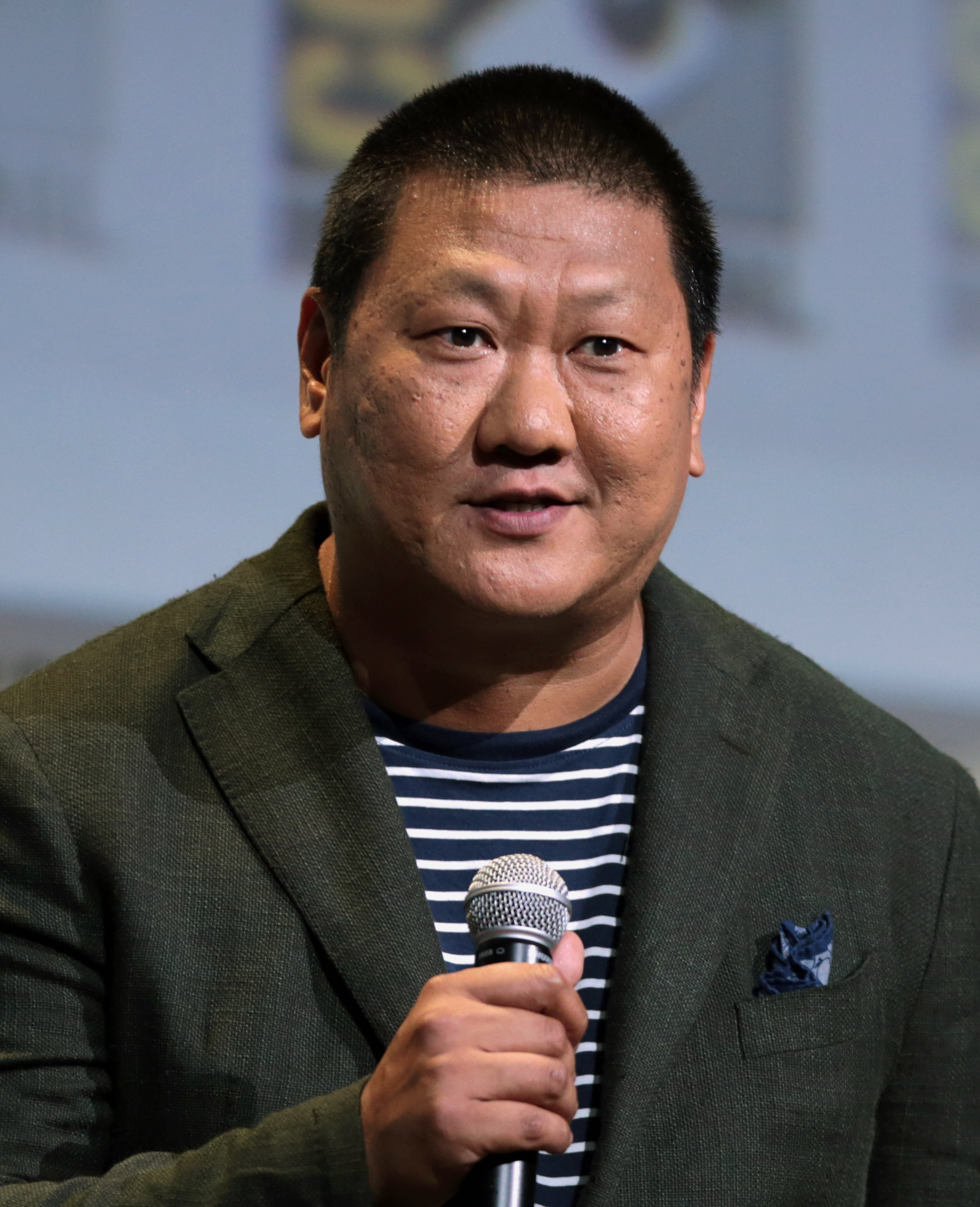
Benedict Wong promoting Doctor Strange at the 2016 San Diego Comic-Con

Benedict Wong portrays Wong in the MCU films Doctor Strange (2016), Avengers: Infinity War (2018), Avengers: Endgame (2019), Shang-Chi and the Legend of the Ten Rings (2021), Spider-Man: No Way Home (2021), and Doctor Strange in the Multiverse of Madness (2022), and in the Disney+ series She-Hulk: Attorney at Law (2022). The actor was excited "to be sat at a table of Asian excellence" amongst the cast of Shang-Chi. He also voiced an alternate version of Wong in the What If...? episode "What If... Doctor Strange Lost His Heart Instead of His Hands?", while another version of the character has a silent appearance in "What If... Zombies?!" and David Chen voicing Wong in the episode "What If... the Emergence Destroyed the Earth?".

== Reception ==
Wong is seen as a "fan-favorite" character by some journalists. Talia Franks of Nerdist named Wong one of the "breakout characters of the Marvel Cinematic Universe in the past few years," asserting, "Wong's development throughout the films and shows has been enjoyable to watch as we peel back the ways in which there is more than meets the eye. In an ensemble franchise such as the Marvel Cinematic Universe, it is difficult to give time to any one character. Supporting characters like Wong do not always get the time they deserve, with their attributes instead sprinkled throughout everywhere they appear." Shania Russell of /Film asserted, "Wong is truly a vibe. He's the ideal superhero, with exactly the attitude we want our superpowered beings to have. He takes his job very seriously — whether it's safeguarding the world against dark sorcerers or gathering the Avengers to take down Thanos. But that doesn't mean there's no time for fun." Brandon Zachary of CBR.com described Wong as a "skillful but relatable figure in the MCU," saying, "He's got enough power to hold his own in a fight but isn't so powerful that he can solve everything on his own. He serves as a friendly face the heroes can rely on for support or a joke, and can help bind the more unique corners of the film closer together."

Benedict Wong's portrayal of Wong was praised by several critics. Tara Bennett of Syfy wrote, "So much of Wong's success as a character is because of the skills of actor Benedict Wong. Because he's a comedian and dramatic actor of equal strength, Benedict has proven himself to be exceptionally resourceful to the writers and directors of the MCU." Myles Hughes of Looper said, "Benedict Wong's take on the character has become one of the standouts of the Marvel Cinematic Universe. He's entered into the same realm as Clark Gregg, Hayley Atwell, Kat Dennings or Randall Park — crossing franchises, mixing with various heroes, always a welcome face no matter how short the screentime. "

=== Accolades ===
Year	Work(s)	Award	Category	Result	Ref(s)
2022	Doctor Strange in the Multiverse of Madness	Saturn Awards	Best Supporting Actor in a Film	Nominated	

== See also ==
- Characters of the Marvel Cinematic Universe
