= Stephan Franck =

French-American animator and writer

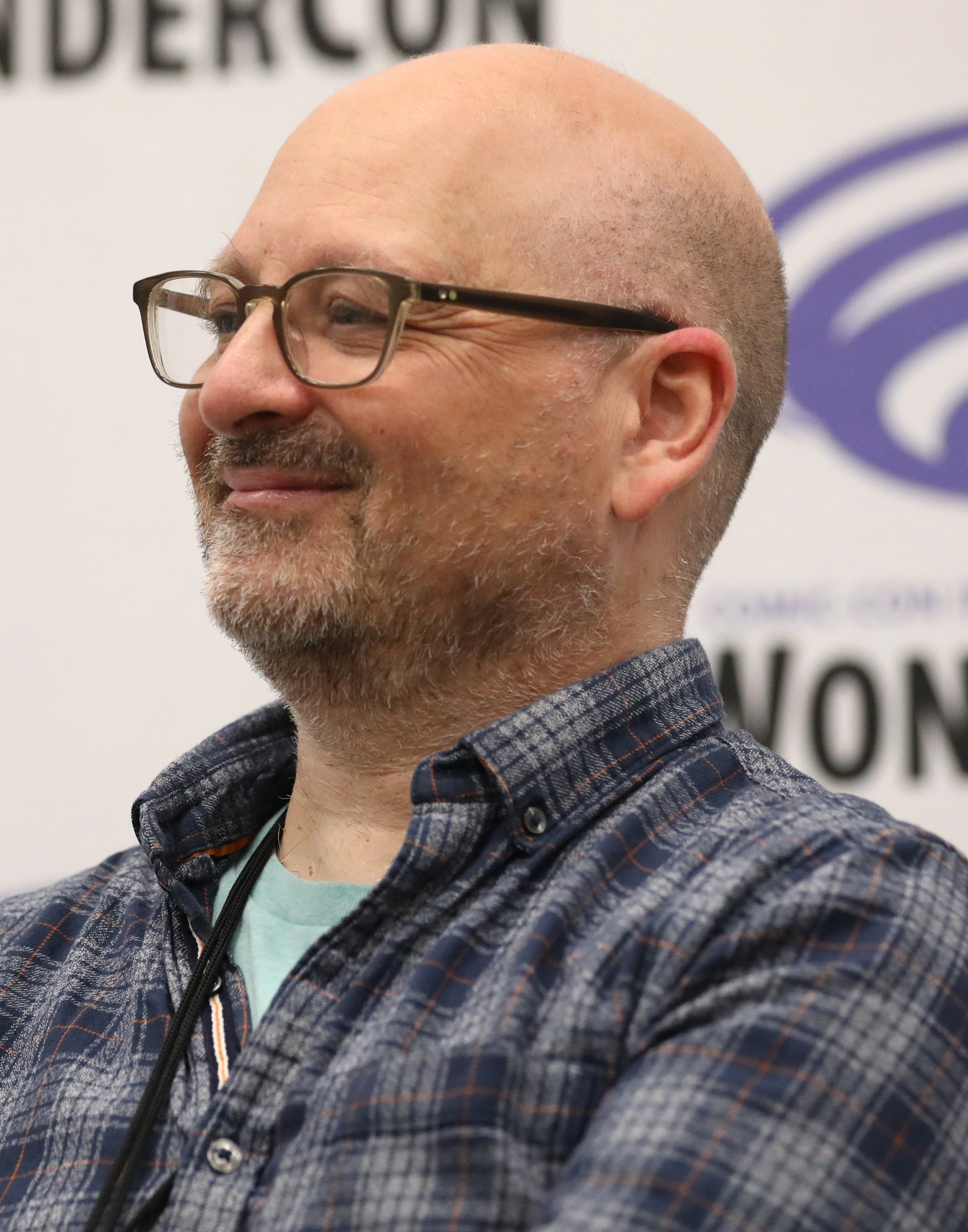
- Franck at the 2024 WonderCon
- Occupations: Animator, writer, director, comics creator
- Notable work: Corneil & Bernie; The Smurfs: The Legend of Smurfy Hollow; Silver; What If...?

Stephan Franck is a Franco-American animator, writer, director, and comics creator. In 2013, he received an Annie Award nomination for Best Director for a direct to video or TV broadcast for The Smurfs: The Legend of Smurfy Hollow. Franck supervised the animation of the first season of the Disney+ Marvel Animation series What If...?. He directed the season two episode "What If... Nebula Joined the Nova Corps?", as well as the season three episodes "What If... the Hulk Fought the Mech Avengers?", "What If... Howard the Duck Got Hitched?","What If... the Emergence Destroyed the Earth?", "What If... 1872?" (co-directed with Bryan Andrews), and "What If... the Watcher Disappeared?".

In 2014, Franck was nominated for the Russ Manning Award for the first volume of the graphic novel series Silver which he writes and illustrates. In 2017, it was announced that writer Andrew Cosby was attached to write a movie adaptation of the Silver series. In 2022, the publishing of Silver moved from Dark Planet to Abrams Books's ComicArts Imprint. Franck's neo-noir graphic novel series Palomino debuted in 2020, with 2 more volumes released in 2023, earning Franck a 2024 Ringo Award nomination.

Franck is also the co-creator of the animated TV show Corneil & Bernie.

== Award nominations ==
- Russ Manning Award Nomination – 2014 "Silver Volume 1" (Dark Planet)
- Annie Award Nomination – 2014 Outstanding Achievement, Directing in an Animated TV/Broadcast Production – The Smurfs: The Legend of Smurfy Hollow (Sony Pictures Animation)
- Ringo Award Nomination – 2024 "Palomino Volume 2 and 3" (Dark Planet)
