= Watcher (Marvel Cinematic Universe) =

Character in the Marvel Cinematic Universe

The Watcher
- Marvel Cinematic Universe character
- The Watcher in What If...?
- First appearance: "What If... Captain Carter Were the First Avenger?"; What If...?; (2021)
- Based on: Uatu by: Stan Lee; Jack Kirby
- Adapted by: A. C. Bradley
- Voiced by: Jeffrey Wright; Amuche Chukudebelu (What If...? – An Immersive Story)

In-universe information
- Full name: Uatu
- Species: Watchers
- Occupation: Observer of the Multiverse

Uatu, also known as the Watcher, is a character voiced by Jeffrey Wright, appearing in the Marvel Cinematic Universe (MCU) media franchise, based on the Marvel Comics character of the same name. He is a member of the Watchers race, and observes the branching timelines of the multiverse in What If...?, initially pledging not to interfere with events, but eventually breaking his pledge and siding with heroic characters of various universes against destructive forces. The Watcher serves as the narrator for the series.

As of 2025, the character has appeared in a significant capacity in two projects: the Disney+ animated series What If...? (2021–2024) and I Am Groot (2023). The Watcher is also seen in the background of a number of Disney+ series as an Easter egg, as well as being featured in the mixed-reality experience What If...? – An Immersive Story (2024).

== Concept and creation ==
=== Background and development ===
Created by writer Stan Lee and artist and co-plotter Jack Kirby for Marvel Comics, the character Uatu / Watcher first appeared without a name in Fantastic Four vol. 1 #13 (1963), and periodically reappeared in that title. He then starred in "Tales of the Watcher", a backup feature that ran in Tales of Suspense vol. 1 #49–58 (1964–1965), Silver Surfer vol. 1 #1–7 (1968–1969), and Marvel Super-Heroes vol. 1 #23 (1969). His origin was revealed in Tales of Suspense vol. 1 #52–53 (1964), and his name was revealed in Captain Marvel vol. 1 #39 (1975).

The Watchers race first appeared in the Marvel Cinematic Universe (MCU) in the film Guardians of the Galaxy Vol. 2 (2017), as part of a Stan Lee cameo appearance in which Lee appears as an informant to the Watchers, discussing previous adventures that include his cameos in other MCU films. This acknowledged the fan theory that Lee may be portraying the same character in all his cameos, with Vol. 2 director James Gunn noting that "people thought Stan Lee is a Watcher and that all of these cameos are part of him being a Watcher. So, Stan Lee as a guy who is working for the Watchers was something that I thought was fun for the MCU."

=== Casting and appearances ===
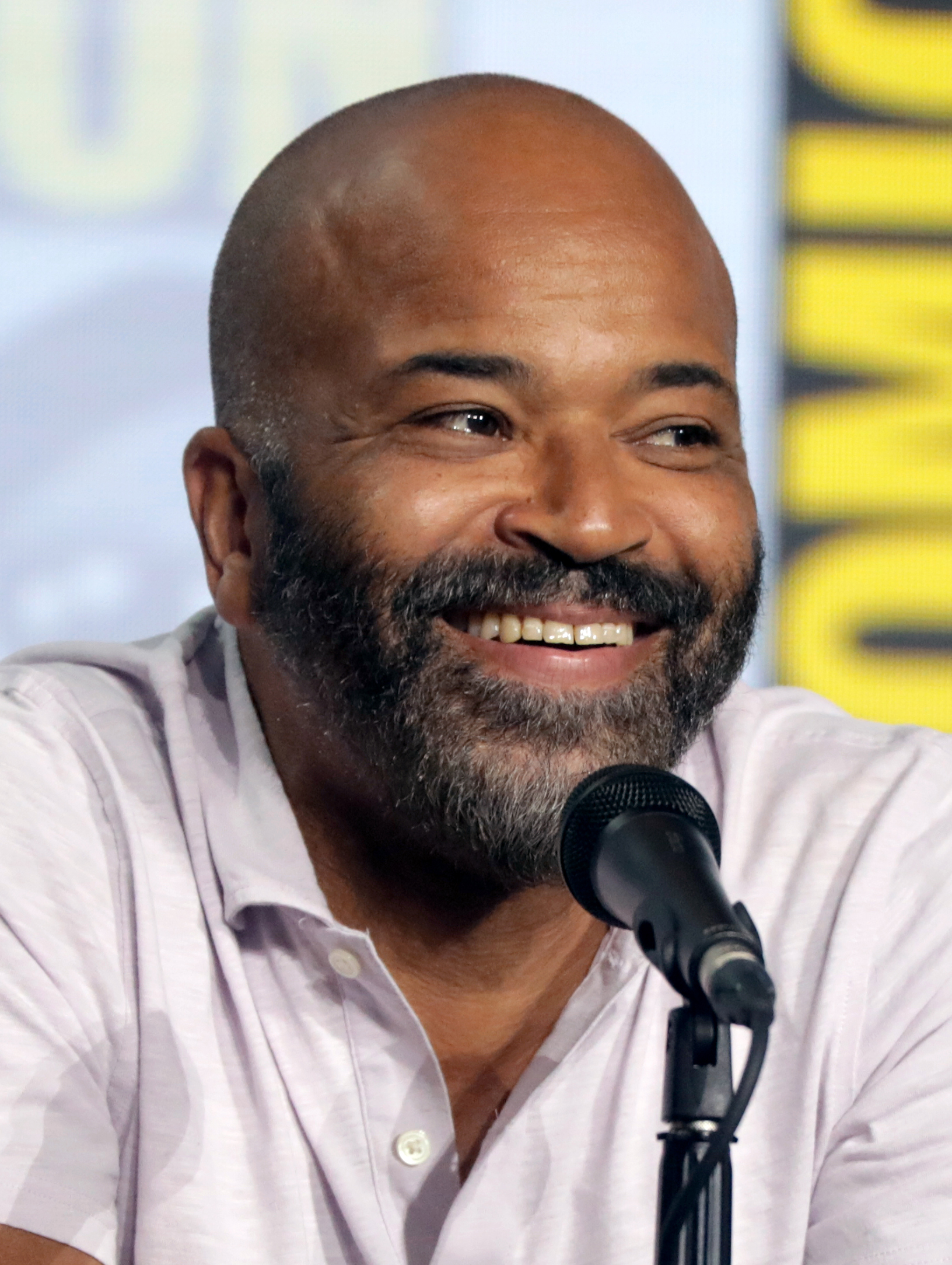
Jeffrey Wright stars as the Watcher, who narrates each episode of What If...?

In July 2019, Jeffrey Wright was announced to be voicing the Watcher in the Disney+ animated series What If...? (2021–2024), with the character serving as the series' narrator. Wright reprises his role in the Disney+ animated short series I Am Groot (2022–2023). In the mixed reality experience What If...? – An Immersive Story (2024), the Watcher is voiced by Amuche Chukudebelu. Easter eggs depicting the Watcher's silluoette are also seen in the background of the Disney+ series X-Men '97 (2024–present), Your Friendly Neighborhood Spider-Man (2025–present), Eyes of Wakanda (2025), Marvel Zombies (2025), and VisionQuest (2026).

By April 2026, commentators believed there was a possible appearance of the Watcher in an episode of the Disney+ series Daredevil: Born Again (2025–present), which was acknowledged by Marvel Studios's head of streaming, television, and animation Brad Winderbaum. An outline of the Watcher's head is seemingly created out of broken glass after Bullseye and Daredevil escape through the window of Fogwell's Gym, with the indoor light fixtures believed to be forming the Watcher's eyes.

=== Characterization ===
What If...? writer A. C. Bradley said the character is "above everything else" and compared him to a viewer of the "pizza rat" video, observing and not interfering as he has "no interest in becoming friends with the rat, living amongst the rat, or doing rat things... That is the Watcher's relationship with humanity." The Watcher's role in the series has been likened to Rod Serling's in The Twilight Zone. Winderbaum, who served as an executive producer on the series, felt Wright's vocal performance inspired a sense of humanity while explaining things about the episodes, and Bradley explained that Wright was cast because his voice mixes power, charisma, and authority with a "warm personality". Wright approached the character like he would a live-action role, learning as much as he could about the Watcher so his voice could reflect the character's "uniquely powerful, all-seeing, sagely presence". Wright chose a contemporary American accent rather than having the character sound like "some Oxford-educated, old, fusty guy in a tudor parlor somewhere", and, aside from researching the character's comic book appearances, Wright took inspiration from the series' tone, visuals, and animation when developing the character's voice. The comic book name "Uatu" is initially not used in the series because this would imply that there was more than one being watching the series' events when Bradley instead wanted to focus on the narrative of "the Watcher" observing the different characters and realities and how those affect him. However, the Watcher is identified as Uatu by the end of the third season.

== Fictional character biography ==
=== Observing the multiverse ===
Following the creation of the multiverse, the Watcher observes the branching timelines that stem from the "Sacred Timeline". At first, the Watcher narrates the stories of Captain Carter, T'Challa Star-Lord, the assassination of the Avengers, and when Doctor Strange Supreme fell to darkness. While observing Strange's story, Strange begins to witness the Watcher and later, begs for him to save his universe that is collapsing, but the Watcher refuses to interfere due to his oath, leaving Strange alone. The Watcher continues his observations, which includes the zombie apocalypse, Erik "Killmonger" Stevens saving and befriending Tony Stark, and Thor adopting a party lifestyle.

==== Against Ultron ====
He later observes and narrates the events of another universe, where Ultron succeeded in wiping out life on his universe by uploading his consciousness in Vision's body, and obtaining all of the Infinity Stones. Like Strange Supreme, Ultron also becomes aware of the Watcher after hearing his voice, and (to the Watcher's horror) intends to destroy and conquer the multiverse.

As the surviving Avengers from Ultron's universe seek an artificial intelligence which can wipe out Ultron's program, the Watcher is attacked by Ultron throughout the multiverse. He attempts to fight back, but is overpowered by Ultron and forced to retreat. The Watcher is met with Strange Supreme, who convinces him that it is time to "break his oath" if he wants to stop Ultron. Reluctant at first, the Watcher agrees, and recruits Captain Carter, Star-Lord T'Challa, Prince Killmonger, Party Thor, and a Warlord version of Gamora to become the Guardians of the Multiverse. This group of Guardians ultimately defeats Ultron, resulting in Prince Killmonger and Arnim Zola eternally fighting for control of the Infinity Stones in a pocket universe watched by Strange Supreme, which Strange realizes was the Watcher's plan all along. The Watcher also transplants the Black Widow of the universe destroyed by Ultron to "a world that lost their widow".

==== Continued interference and standing trial ====
In the third season, the Watcher continues to interfere in the stories of various heroes, and is put on trial by other Watchers due to his disobedience to their cardinal rule of noninterference. In the Fifth Dimension, the Watcher stands trial before the other three Watchers, the Eminence, the Incarnate, and the Executioner, while Captain Peggy Carter leads a team consisting of Kahhori, a grown-up Byrdie, and a Mjolnir-wielding Storm in stopping multiversal incursions. Carter and her team notice three shards from the Watcher's observatory and resolve to help him. After Carter is captured, a variant of Infinity Ultron agrees to help rescue Carter and the Watcher.

In a flashback, a Watcher disciple named Uatu was recruited to become a full Watcher by the Eminence. In the present, the Watcher is placed on trial for his repeated interference, such as giving Doctor Strange Supreme the information he needed to recreate his destroyed universe, saving Riri Williams and Kwai Jun-Fan amongst others, as well as involving Captain Carter in his affairs. The Watcher and Carter are rescued by Ultron, who sacrifices himself to buy them time to escape. The Watchers give chase, attempting to erase them from existence, but the Watcher grants Carter's team the powers of a Watcher before Carter sacrifices herself to transport everyone to Strange Supreme's universe where Strange, having become the sentient consciousness of that universe, removes the powers of the Eminence, Incarnate, and Executioner. The Watcher convinces the humbled trio to learn by watching over life in this new universe. As they mourn Carter's death, the Watcher invites Kahhori, Byrdie, and Storm to join him in watching over the multiverse.

== Reception ==
Wright was twice nominated for Outstanding Character Voice-Over Performance for his performance in the role, first at the 74th Primetime Creative Arts Emmy Awards in 2022 for his work on "What If... Ultron Won?", and again at the 77th Primetime Creative Arts Emmy Awards in 2025, for his work on "What If... 1872?".

== See also ==
- Characters of the Marvel Cinematic Universe
