= A. C. Bradley (screenwriter) =

American writer and producer

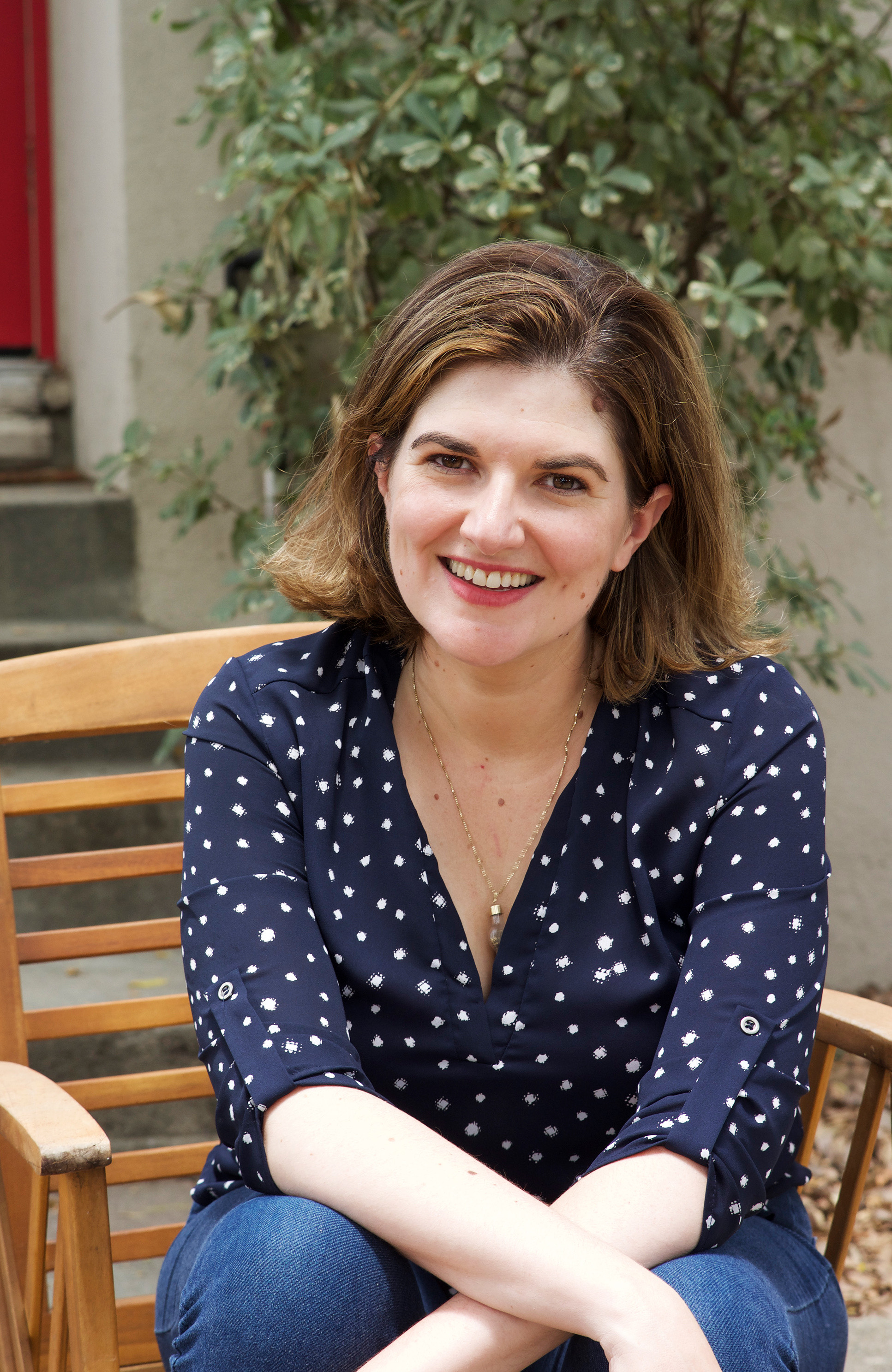
- Bradley in 2024
- Born: Ashley C. Bradley
- Education: Boston College; USC School of Cinematic Arts
- Occupations: Television writer and television producer
- Years active: 2014–present
- Children: 1

Ashley C. Bradley is an American television writer and producer. She is known for her work on the animated series Trollhunters: Tales of Arcadia, 3Below: Tales of Arcadia, and What If...?.

== Career ==
In August 2019, it was announced Bradley would be the head writer and executive producer of the Marvel Studios animated series What If...?, which was released on Disney+ on August 11, 2021. She also served as consulting producer and writer on Ms. Marvel.

Bradley's first feature film, Much Ado, which is based on the William Shakespeare play Much Ado About Nothing, is currently in active development at Sony Pictures. Nisha Ganatra is attached to direct and Will Gluck is producing. Bradley and Gluck are also writing the script for a film adaptation of the video game Just Dance, with Gluck set to direct. Bradley will also be the showrunner for an animated series based on the Warriors novels, set for release on Disney Channel and Disney+.

== Personal life ==
Bradley is from the borough of the Bronx in New York City. She studied international relations and English literature at Boston College and graduated from the USC School of Cinematic Arts with a master's degree and a M.F.A. degree in screenwriting. She has a daughter, born in early 2021. Bradley found out that she was partially infertile during the COVID-19 pandemic, so she decided to have children as soon as she could, crediting the pandemic and Marvel Studios employees Danielle Costa and Victoria Alonso for inspiring her to "take the leap". In 2025, she lost her home in Altadena, California to the January 2025 Southern California wildfires.

== Filmography ==
Year	Title	Credited as		Notes
Year	Title	Writer	Producer	Notes
2014	Arrow	Yes	No	Episode: "Birds of Prey"
2016–18	Trollhunters: Tales of Arcadia	Yes	No	Wrote 23 episodes
2018–19	3Below: Tales of Arcadia	Yes	No	Head writer Wrote 5 episodes, also story editor
2021–24	What If...?	Yes	Executive	Head writer (Seasons 1–2), Disney+ series Wrote 11 episodes
2022	Ms. Marvel	Yes	Yes	Consulting producer, wrote 3 episodes
TBA	Warrior Cats	Yes	TBA	Upcoming series, showrunner
TBA	Much Ado	Yes	TBA	Upcoming film, credited as Ashley Bradley
TBA	Just Dance	Yes	TBA	Upcoming film, with Will Gluck

== Awards and nominations ==
Year	Award	Category	Work	Result	Ref.
2018	Kidscreen Awards	Best Writing	Trollhunters: Tales of Arcadia (for "Escape from the Darklands")	Won	
2018	Annie Awards	Outstanding Achievement for Writing in an Animated Television / Broadcast Production	Trollhunters: Tales of Arcadia (for "Escape from the Darklands")	Nominated	
2018	Daytime Emmy Awards	Outstanding Writing in an Animated Program	Trollhunters: Tales of Arcadia	Won	
2019	Daytime Emmy Awards	Outstanding Writing for an Animated Program	Trollhunters: Tales of Arcadia	Nominated	
2022	Critics Choice Awards	Best Animated Series	What If...?	Won	
2022	Primetime Emmy Awards	Outstanding Animated Program	What If...? (for "What If... Doctor Strange Lost His Heart Instead of His Hands?")	Nominated	
