= What If... Ultron Won? =

- What If...? episode
- Promotional poster
- Episode no.: Season 1 Episode 8
- Directed by: Bryan Andrews
- Written by: Matthew Chauncey
- Editing by: Graham Fisher; Joel Fisher
- Original release date: September 29, 2021
- Running time: 30 minutes

Cast
- Jeremy Renner as Clint Barton / Hawkeye; Lake Bell as Natasha Romanoff / Black Widow; Toby Jones as Arnim Zola; Ross Marquand as Ultron and Sub-Ultron Sentries; Josh Keaton as Steve Rogers / Captain America; Mick Wingert as Tony Stark / Iron Man; Alexandra Daniels as Carol Danvers / Captain Marvel; Benedict Cumberbatch as Doctor Strange Supreme

Episode chronology
← Previous "What If... Thor Were an Only Child?"	Next → "What If... the Watcher Broke His Oath?"
- What If...? season 1

"What If... Ultron Won?" is the eighth episode of the American animated television series What If...?, based on the Marvel Comics series of the same name. It explores what would happen if the events of the Marvel Cinematic Universe (MCU) film Avengers: Age of Ultron (2015) occurred differently, with Ultron using the Infinity Stones to eliminate all life in the universe after successfully transferring his consciousness into Vision's body. It also serves to set up the first season's finale, as Ultron finds a way to traverse to other universes (established in the previous episodes), threatening the balance of the multiverse. The episode was written by story editor Matthew Chauncey and directed by Bryan Andrews.

Jeffrey Wright narrates the series as the Watcher, with this episode also starring the voices of Jeremy Renner, Lake Bell, Toby Jones, Ross Marquand (Ultron), Josh Keaton, Mick Wingert, Alexandra Daniels, and Benedict Cumberbatch. The series began development by September 2018, with Andrews joining soon after, and many actors expected to reprise their roles from the MCU films. Animation for the episode was provided by Flying Bark Productions, Squeeze, and Stellar Creative Lab, with Stephan Franck serving as head of animation.

"What If... Ultron Won?" was released on Disney+ on September 29, 2021. Critics praised the episode for its visuals, action, high-stakes storyline, and the vocal performances of Wright, Renner and Bell, but criticized certain aspects of the story.

== Plot ==
Tony Stark creates the "Ultron" global defense program to keep the Earth safe and establish world peace. However, Ultron goes rogue and concludes that Earth requires evolution, leading him to create and transfer his programming into an organic body made from vibranium. (Note: This transference is when the story diverges from the events of the film Avengers: Age of Ultron (2015).) He then proceeds to kill Stark and most of the Avengers before launching nuclear missiles around the Earth, eradicating most of humanity.

Shortly after, Thanos arrives, seeking the Mind Stone to complete the Infinity Gauntlet, but Ultron bisects him and takes the Infinity Stones for himself, becoming aware of the more expansive universe. Using the Stones' power, Ultron builds an army of Ultron Sentries and a teleporting spaceship before destroying several planets and killing most of the universe's remaining life. With his mission complete, Ultron is left without a purpose until he hears the Watcher's narration and becomes aware of the multiverse's existence.

Meanwhile, surviving Avengers Natasha Romanoff and Clint Barton fight to survive Ultron's forces. However, Barton is losing his will to live. Arriving in Moscow, they search KGB files in the hopes of defeating Ultron, finding one for Arnim Zola, a Hydra scientist whose consciousness was uploaded into a computer after his death. (Note: As depicted in Captain America: The Winter Soldier (2014)) Romanoff and Barton travel to a Siberian Hydra laboratory and coerce Zola into helping them, intending to upload him into Ultron's programming to delete Ultron. They lure in a group of Ultron Sentries and upload Zola's consciousness into one. However, Zola cannot upload himself into Ultron as he has left their universe. Barton sacrifices himself so that Romanoff and Zola can escape.

Upon locating the Watcher, Ultron fights him across multiple realities and emerges victorious, but the Watcher flees before he can be killed. Ultron assumes control of the Watcher's Observational Plane, now having countless universes to attack. With no other options, the Watcher meets with Doctor Strange Supreme, whom he had previously left to his fate, (Note: As depicted in the fourth episode, "What If... Doctor Strange Lost His Heart Instead of His Hands?") and requests his help in stopping Ultron.

== Production ==
=== Development ===
External videos
- What If... Ultron Won? | Marvel Studios' What If...? | Disney+, a promotional video introducing the episode's "what if" concept with narration by Jeffrey Wright as the Watcher, video from the What If...? Twitter account

By September 2018, Marvel Studios was developing an animated anthology series based on the What If...? comic books, which would explore how the Marvel Cinematic Universe (MCU) films would be altered if certain events occurred differently. Head writer A. C. Bradley joined the project in October 2018, with director Bryan Andrews meeting Marvel Studios executive Brad Winderbaum about the project as early as 2018; Bradley and Andrews' involvement was announced in August 2019. They executive produce alongside Winderbaum, Kevin Feige, Louis D'Esposito, and Victoria Alonso. Story editor Matthew Chauncey wrote the eighth episode, titled "What If... Ultron Won?", which features an alternate storyline of the film Avengers: Age of Ultron (2015). "What If... Ultron Won?" was released on Disney+ on September 29, 2021.

=== Writing ===
In the episode's alternate storyline, Ultron successfully transfers his consciousness into Vision's body. The merger between Ultron and Vision first appeared at the end of the previous episode. This episode begins to tie together elements from all of the previous episodes of the season, while the Watcher "learns a few important lessons about what it means to be a hero" and that the various stories and worlds he witnessed mean more to him than he realized. A "major source of tension" within the episodes is whether the Watcher will interfere in events. Though the events of the episode can be viewed as standalone, it establishes a story that continues in the season finale. It was discussed at the writers' room to write the first season's last two episodes as "one giant story" that would eventually bring back most of the heroes from previous episodes. Early on the show's development, before the creative team conceived the episode's story, the idea of having Ultron winning was always present in the team's minds.

Ultron was chosen as the main villain of the episode and the first season overall due to his popularity among Marvel Comics readers and his lack of potential in the Marvel Cinematic Universe (MCU) films due to only appearing in Age of Ultron. Feeling that Ultron didn't have the screentime he deserved and acknowledging that by now the filmmakers have reached the MCU's Phase Four, Bradley and the writers decided to take the opportunity to show what Ultron was really capable now that they were involving the Multiverse and the Infinity Stones in their stories, speculating what would Ultron do with the Infinity Gauntlet. Concurrent to Ultron's victory, the concept offered the opportunity to show the human side of the tragedy by focusing Natasha Romanoff / Black Widow and Clint Barton / Hawkeye and their relationship; before the episode's pitching, Andrews always had in mind featuring Hawkeye or Black Widow, at least the former, living in the post-apocalyptic Earth dealing with the loss of his family and friends. He felt that the pair's lack of godly powers like those of Thor but their "gritty and hard core" capabilities gave hope to humanity.

In one of the alternate universes seen during the Watcher's fight with Ultron depicts Steve Rogers / Captain America being sworn as President of the United States. Bradley and writer Matthew Chauncey had discussed early on about writing a political episode starring Captain America inspired by Aaron Sorkin's The West Wing (1999-2006), with characters fulfilling similar roles to those of Josh Lyman and C.J. Cregg in the show, but the idea was left on the "idea-room floor" due to being an episode with a lot of dialogue and little action.

=== Casting ===
Jeffrey Wright narrates the episode as the Watcher, with Marvel planning to have other characters in the series voiced by the actors who portrayed them in the MCU films. The episode stars Avengers: Age of Ultron actor Jeremy Renner as Clint Barton / Hawkeye. Toby Jones reprises his role of Arnim Zola from previous MCU media and Benedict Cumberbatch reprises his role as Doctor Strange Supreme from the fourth episode. Lake Bell reprises her role as Natasha Romanoff / Black Widow from the third episode, in which she replaced Scarlett Johansson, while Josh Keaton, Mick Wingert, and Alexandra Daniels also reprise their roles as Steve Rogers / Captain America, Tony Stark / Iron Man, and Carol Danvers / Captain Marvel, respectively, from previous episodes, in which they replaced Chris Evans, Robert Downey Jr. and Brie Larson.

James Spader does not reprise his role as Ultron with Ross Marquand voicing Ultron and the Sub-Ultron Sentries, having previously voiced the character for the virtual reality experience Avengers: Damage Control. This version of Ultron was marketed as "Infinity Ultron". In casting Ultron, the production team led by Louis D'Esposito apparently tried to bring back Spader to reprise his role first, but when that didn't work out, they decided to cast Marquand in the role, allowing him to deliver an "incredibly chilling" vocal performance. Bradley and Andrews considered the possibility of having Paul Bettany, who played J.A.R.V.I.S. and Vision in the film series, take on the role, but they desisted due to their desire to make the character "terrifying" and feeling that Bettany's voice would be too much of a "disconnect" for the audience to believe that Ultron was inside Vision's body. They reasoned that Ultron could choose whatever voice it suited to him so his voice would not necessarily need to resemble that of Vision.

Several MCU characters appear in non-speaking roles, including Thor, Hulk, Thaddeus Ross, Thanos, Peter Quill / Star-Lord, Gamora, Drax, Korg, the Grandmaster, and Ego, as well as inhabitants of Wakanda and members of the Skrull species.

=== Animation ===
Animation for the episode was provided by Flying Bark Productions, Squeeze, and Stellar Creative Lab, with Stephan Franck serving as head of animation. Andrews developed the series' cel-shaded animation style with Ryan Meinerding, the head of visual development at Marvel Studios. Though the series has a consistent art style, elements such as the camera and color palette differ between episodes.

To depict the fighting styles of both Ultron and the Watcher in this episode and its successor, the animators used the Kirby Krackle, which helped to showcase the immense multiversal power both characters have. Bradley was adamant to adopt this artistic convention for the show due to never being used in the franchise's live-action films.

=== Music ===
A soundtrack for the episode was released digitally by Marvel Music and Hollywood Records on October 1, 2021, featuring composer Laura Karpman's score.

What If... Ultron Won? (Original Soundtrack)
No.	Title	Length
1.	"Clock"	2:19
2.	"Path to Peace"	0:58
3.	"The Distinction"	0:54
4.	"Fascinating"	2:17
5.	"Can't Win"	1:06
6.	"Aware"	4:31
7.	"My Purpose"	2:00
8.	"Ninety Seconds"	1:55
9.	"Sound Promising"	1:18
10.	"Keep Moving"	1:13
11.	"Entire Multiverse"	1:22
12.	"Natural Order"	1:21
Total length:		21:14

== Marketing ==
After the episode's release, Marvel released a poster for the episode, featuring Ultron and the Watcher together with a quote from the episode. Marvel also announced merchandise inspired by the episode as part of its weekly "Marvel Must Haves" promotion for each episode of the series, including apparel, accessories, and a Funko Pop based on Infinity Ultron.

== Reception ==
=== Critical response ===
Kirsten Howard at Den of Geek believed the episode to have the best animated sequences of any episode released, which she attributed to fewer characters and a simpler story, and said the visual style suited this episode more than others. Howard praised Ultron in "near-Galactus form" as a "sight to behold", along with other moments she considered "truly a joyful experience". She gave the episode 4.5 out of 5 stars. io9's Charles Pulliam-Moore considered the episode to be the show's "most exciting story yet," praising how it built upon the original story of Age of Ultron. Pulliam-Moore complimented Bell's and Wright's portrayal of Natasha Romanoff and the Watcher, respectively, but criticized Carol Danvers' appearance, saying it was part of a broader problem of not giving the character a developed personality. He also praised the fight scene between Ultron and the Watcher, which he compared to Dragon Ball Z. Karen Rought at Hypable commended the fight scene as well, and called the episode "the most interesting and high-stakes so far". She explored the importance of the episode, with "insane" implications to the broader continuity of the Marvel Cinematic Universe.

IGN's Tom Jorgensen thought the episode was "one of the clearest displays yet of What If's strengths and potential for extrapolating worthwhile stories out of MCU canon", praising the story divergences from the films while "keeping the themes of Age of Ultron" by focusing on more grounded characters like Renner's Barton and Bell's Romanoff, whose performances he praised. Jorgensen also considered it "the most cinematic of any What If installment yet", and praised its visuals. However, he was critical of the action sequences. Amon Warmann at Yahoo! Movies also praised the interactions between Natasha Romanoff and Clint Barton, calling it a "smart move" to focus on the "two most human Avengers". Warmann also praised the fight scene between the Watcher and Ultron as the series' "best action sequence yet" and the visuals as "stunning" and "ripped right out of a comic". Nevertheless, he considered the episode had "sloppy storytelling", and criticized the trivialization of Thanos' power as "sacrificing story and character" to serve the needs of the story. Sam Barsanti from The A.V. Club was more critical of the episode, giving it a "C". Barsanti praised the concept of Ultron getting the Infinity Stones and the character's design, comparing it to the Annihilation: Conquest comics storyline, but he criticized the conclusion of Romanoff and Barton's story and the episode breaking the series' anthology structure. He also criticized the fight between Ultron and the Watcher, considering it uncreative, and added that the appearance of Strange Supreme, treated as a twist ending, "fell a little flat" after being spoiled by the mid-season trailer for the series. He also thought the voice acting was "disappointingly bland", and compared both Bell and Marquand negatively to original actors Johansson and Spader, respectively.

=== Accolades ===
Joel Fisher, Graham Fisher, Sharia Davis, Basuki Juwono and Adam Spieckerman won the award for Best Editorial – TV/Media at the 49th Annie Awards. Wright was nominated for Outstanding Character Voice-Over Performance at the 74th Primetime Creative Arts Emmy Awards. Graham Fisher and Joel Fisher was nominated for Best Edited Animation (Non-Theatrical) at the 2022 American Cinema Editors Awards.
