= What If... Captain Carter Were the First Avenger? =

- What If...? episode
- Promotional poster
- Episode no.: Season 1 Episode 1
- Directed by: Bryan Andrews
- Written by: A. C. Bradley
- Editing by: Graham Fisher
- Original release date: August 11, 2021
- Running time: 33 minutes

Cast
- Hayley Atwell as Peggy Carter / Captain Carter; Josh Keaton as Skinny Steve Rogers; Samuel L. Jackson as Nick Fury; Jeremy Renner as Clint Barton / Hawkeye; Stanley Tucci as Abraham Erskine; Dominic Cooper as Howard Stark; Bradley Whitford as John Flynn; Ross Marquand as Johann Schmidt / Red Skull; Neal McDonough as Dum Dum Dugan; Sebastian Stan as Bucky Barnes; Toby Jones as Arnim Zola; Darrell Hammond as a Nazi general; Isaac Robinson-Smith as Brick

Episode chronology
← Previous —	Next → "What If... T'Challa Became a Star-Lord?"
- What If...? season 1

"What If... Captain Carter Were the First Avenger?" is the first episode of the first season of the American animated television series What If...?, based on the Marvel Comics series of the same name. It explores what would happen if the events of the Marvel Cinematic Universe (MCU) film Captain America: The First Avenger (2011) occurred differently, with Peggy Carter taking the Super Soldier Serum instead of Steve Rogers and becoming the superhero "Captain Carter". The episode was written by head writer A. C. Bradley and directed by Bryan Andrews.

Jeffrey Wright narrates the series as the Watcher, with this episode also starring the voices of Hayley Atwell (Carter), Sebastian Stan, Dominic Cooper, Stanley Tucci, Toby Jones, Bradley Whitford, Ross Marquand, and Darrell Hammond. The series began development by September 2018, with Andrews and Bradley joining soon after, and many actors expected to reprise their roles from the MCU films. The episode shows Carter dealing with sexism while becoming a superhero. Animation was provided by Blue Spirit, with Stephan Franck serving as head of animation; they took inspiration from 1940s serial films and old war films.

"What If... Captain Carter Were the First Avenger?" was released on Disney+ on August 11, 2021. Critics praised Atwell's performance and the action sequences, but were mixed on other returning film actors' performances, elements of the animation style, and whether the story was a good introduction to the series or too similar to The First Avenger.

== Plot ==
During World War II, Steve Rogers is chosen to become the world's first super-soldier by receiving Dr. Abraham Erskine's Super Soldier Serum. When Erskine asks if Strategic Scientific Reserve (SSR) Agent Peggy Carter wants to watch the procedure from a safe distance, she chooses to stay in the operating theater. (Note: This choice is when the story diverges from the events of the film Captain America: The First Avenger (2011).)

As Erskine and inventor Howard Stark prepare to put Rogers through the procedure, Heinz Kruger—a spy from the Nazis' science division Hydra—becomes nervous due to Carter's presence and attacks the lab before the transfusion can begin in the hopes of stealing the serum. He kills Erskine and SSR leader Chester Phillips and shoots Rogers before Carter kills Kruger. With limited time to complete the procedure, Carter volunteers to take Rogers' place. She is successfully enhanced, but the SSR's new leader John Flynn refuses to allow her to join the war because she is a woman.

Fifteen months later in Norway, Hydra's leader Johann Schmidt / Red Skull obtains the Tesseract, a powerful artifact that can manipulate space, with which he plans to win the war. Flynn refuses to send anyone to stop Schmidt, but Stark secretly gives Carter a costume and a shield made of Vibranium, which she uses to attack a Hydra convoy in Berlin and successfully retrieve the Tesseract and Hydra scientist Arnim Zola. Following this, Flynn reluctantly promotes Carter to a combat role and she becomes "Captain Carter".

Using the Tesseract, Stark builds a weaponized, armored "Hydra Stomper" suit for Rogers to pilot. Carter and Rogers go on to fight in numerous battles with the Howling Commandos until Rogers is presumed dead while attacking a Hydra train.

Upon obtaining its location from Zola, Carter leads Stark and the commandos in infiltrating Schmidt's castle, where they find Rogers alive. Intending for Hydra to continue in Nazi Germany's place following its collapse, Schmidt uses the Tesseract to open a portal and summon an interdimensional creature, but it kills him. Carter and Rogers battle the creature until the Hydra Stomper runs out of power. As Stark closes the portal, Carter sacrifices herself by pushing the creature back into it.

Almost 70 years later, the Tesseract opens another portal, from which Carter emerges and meets S.H.I.E.L.D. operatives Nick Fury and Clint Barton.

== Production ==
=== Development ===
External videos
- What If... Peggy Carter was the First Avenger? | Marvel Studios' What If...? | Disney+, a promotional video introducing the episode's "what if" concept with narration by Jeffrey Wright as the Watcher, video from the What If...? Twitter account

By September 2018, Marvel Studios was developing an animated anthology series based on the What If...? comic books, which would explore how the Marvel Cinematic Universe (MCU) films would be altered if certain events occurred differently. Head writer A. C. Bradley joined the project in October 2018, with director Bryan Andrews meeting Marvel Studios executive Brad Winderbaum about the project as early as 2018; Bradley and Andrews' involvement was announced in August 2019. They executive produce alongside Winderbaum, Kevin Feige, Louis D'Esposito, and Victoria Alonso. Bradley wrote the first episode, titled "What If... Captain Carter Were the First Avenger?", which features an alternate storyline of the film Captain America: The First Avenger (2011). "What If... Captain Carter Were the First Avenger?" was released on Disney+ on August 11, 2021.

=== Writing ===
In the episode's alternate storyline, Peggy Carter takes the Super Soldier Serum instead of Steve Rogers. Carter becomes the hero known as Captain Carter, with Rogers donning a suit of armor designed by Howard Stark. Captain Carter is inspired by the Peggy Carter / Captain America character that first appeared in the Marvel Puzzle Quest video game (2013) and Exiles (vol. 3) comic series, as well as the Marvel Comics character Captain Britain. During development of the series, Bradley and the writers realized that Captain Carter stood out from the other characters in the series and decided to continue her story after this episode by revisiting her in at least one episode of each future season.

Bradley decided to begin the series with an episode that stayed close to the storyline of the film it was altering to allow the audience to get comfortable with the premise before "throw[ing] them in the deep end". She originally planned a Captain America-based episode in which Steve Rogers fell from the Hydra train and became a brainwashed assassin (instead of that happening to Bucky Barnes as is seen in the films). Rogers would have become "Captain Hydra" and taken over the leadership of Hydra, with former leader Red Skull joining forces with Carter, Barnes, and Howard Stark to stop Rogers. Additionally, Andrews pitched an idea for the series in which the original versions of Captain America and Peggy Carter fought alongside the Pacific Comics character the Rocketeer (who appeared in the 1991 film of the same name directed by Captain America: The First Avenger's director Joe Johnston). Feige and Winderbaum liked those pitches, but had settled on the similar Captain Carter storyline as one of the first concepts for the series. Despite Carter appearing in multiple films, the Marvel One-Shot short film Agent Carter (2013), and the broadcast television series Agent Carter (2015-2016), Marvel felt there was more that they could do with the character.

Bradley was tasked with finding a single point in The First Avenger that could be changed to result in Carter taking the serum instead of Rogers, and settled on the moment where Abraham Erskine asks Carter to wait in the viewing booth while Rogers undergoes the procedure. In the episode, Carter decides to stay in the room. Bradley explained that this made the episode less about Carter taking the serum and more about "a woman who stays in the room. What happens when a woman stays in the room? Well, the world changes. What happens when Peggy Carter shows her worth?" She felt this idea was meaningful to the episode's 1940s setting, and also relevant to the modern day, portraying Carter as a strong, feminist character who has to fight for the right to be a superhero despite taking the serum. Bradley was a fan of Carter before working on the series, including her appearances in the One-Shot and television series, and chose to include the One-Shot character John Flynn in the episode. Flynn takes on the role filled by Tommy Lee Jones' Chester Phillips in The First Avenger, and serves as an antagonist due to his sexist nature which contrasts with the respect that Phillips showed Carter in the film.

Winderbaum found Bradley's take to be emotional and character-focused. Andrews described the episode as "some good old pulpy action with a [relevant to modern day] message behind it; feminism, punching Nazis in the face". Star Hayley Atwell was excited by how this version of the character progressed the role, feeling that it "puts an end to the now-tired narrative that she's underused beside her male counterparts... She knows her value, always has, and here she gets to live it out." Carter finds it easy to use her new abilities and has a lot more fun doing so than Rogers did in The First Avenger. Alonso encouraged Bradley and Andrews to "let [Carter] have fun kicking ass" and not just be serious the whole time, displaying what Atwell called "chutzpah and style and flair". Most of the episode parallels The First Avenger, including the ending where Carter disappears for almost 70 years just as Rogers did in the film. One thing that does not change is the love story between Carter and Rogers, which Winderbaum described as "its own sort of nexus. No matter how you spin the reality around, that love is true." Rogers becomes the hero "Hydra Stomper" in the episode as a way to feature their relationship more. It was originally called the "Hydra Smasher", and there was a joke in the script that compared the two names, but after hearing the joke Feige felt "Hydra Stomper" was better.

=== Casting ===
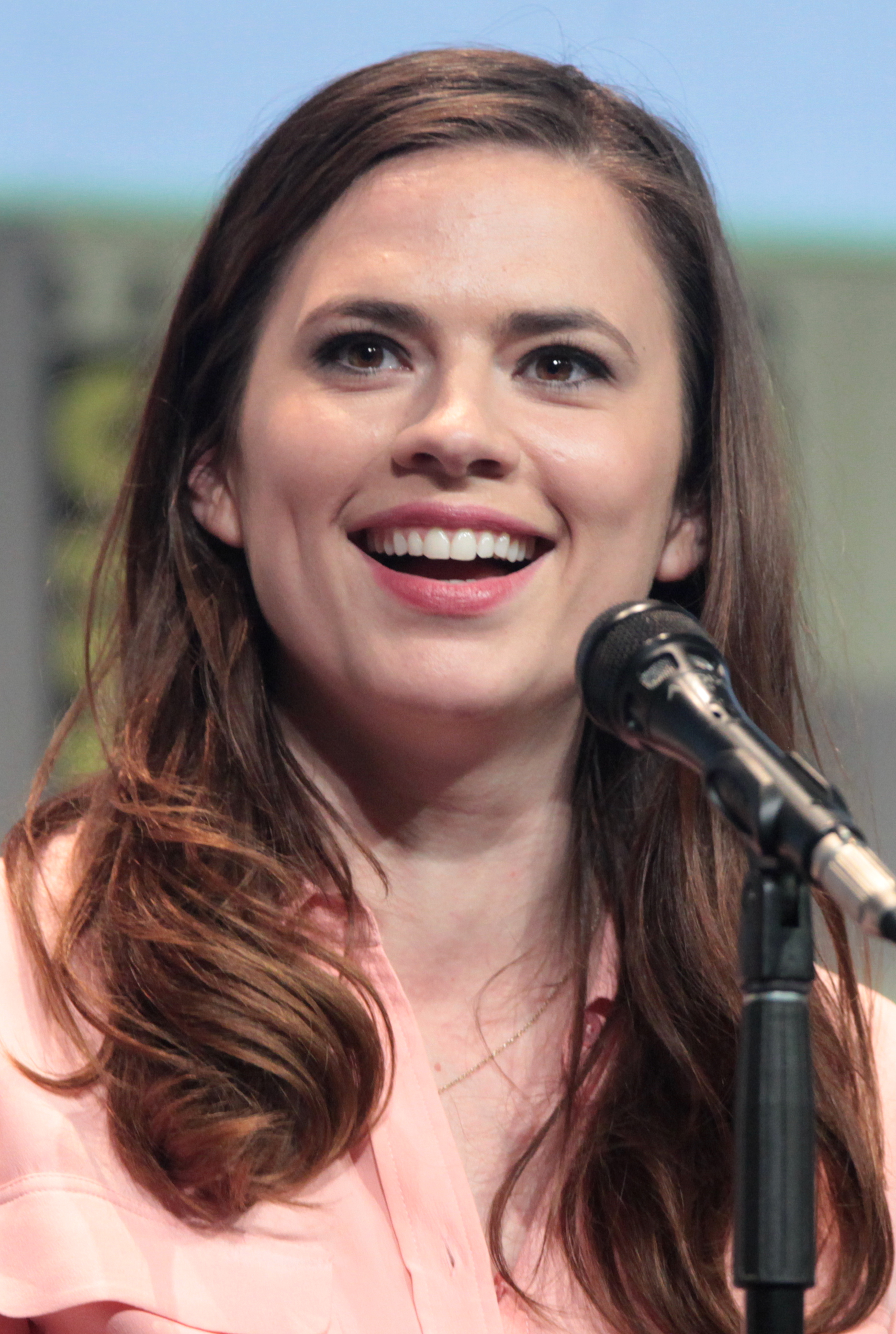
Hayley Atwell stars as Captain Carter in the episode, reprising her Peggy Carter role from past MCU media.

Jeffrey Wright narrates the episode as the Watcher, with Marvel planning to have other characters in the series voiced by the actors who portrayed them in the MCU films. This episode stars the voices of Captain America: The First Avenger actors Hayley Atwell as Peggy Carter / Captain Carter, Samuel L. Jackson as Nick Fury, Stanley Tucci as Abraham Erskine, Dominic Cooper as Howard Stark, Neal McDonough as Dum Dum Dugan, Sebastian Stan as Bucky Barnes, and Toby Jones as Arnim Zola. Stan was surprised to be given funny lines in the episode given Barnes' lack of comedy in the MCU films. Jeremy Renner reprises his MCU film role of Clint Barton / Hawkeye while Bradley Whitford returns as Colonel John Flynn from the Marvel One-Shot short film Agent Carter, bringing a "douchiness" to the role according to A. C. Bradley. The First Avenger characters Chester Phillips, Heinz Kruger, and members of the Howling Commandos appear in non-speaking roles in the episode.

Chris Evans does not reprise his role of Steve Rogers from the film series, with Josh Keaton voicing the character in the episode. Keaton was chosen from four or five options sent to the crew by casting director Josh Stamey, with Bradley feeling that Keaton was a clear standout. Andrews attributed the recasting to Evans' schedule, and initially felt that it would be impossible for a different actor to take on the role. He praised Keaton's emotional intent when voicing Rogers, noting that they did not want him to do a straight impression of Evans. Hugo Weaving also does not reprise his The First Avenger role as Johann Schmidt / Red Skull, with Ross Marquand voicing the character as he did in Avengers: Infinity War (2018) and Avengers: Endgame (2019). Additionally, Darrell Hammond and Isaac Robinson-Smith star as a Nazi general and Brick, respectively.

=== Animation ===
Animation for the episode was provided by Blue Spirit, with Stephan Franck serving as head of animation. Andrews developed the series' cel-shaded animation style with Ryan Meinerding, the head of visual development at Marvel Studios, and took specific inspiration for the episode from 1940s serial films and old war films. Though the series has a consistent art style, elements such as the color palette differ between episodes; Meinerding stated that this episode has "warm, golden colors". Concept art for the episode is included during the end credits, and was released online by Marvel following the episode's premiere.

Andrews worked as a storyboard artist on several MCU films, and adapted some of his unused Captain America poses and moves for Captain Carter's action sequences. Discussing the most challenging aspects of animating the series, Franck said "high action" was at one end of that spectrum and gave Carter's action sequences in the episode as an example, especially the sequence where she attacks several planes. This was because the movements in the series' animation style were unique and had to be learned by the animation team while they were making the episode. Bradley or Andrews suggested the episode end with an interdimensional tentacle monster, with similar creatures appearing in 1940s serials. Bradley based her description in the script on the Abilisk, an interdimensional tentacle monster from Guardians of the Galaxy Vol. 2 (2017), but then let the animation team "just kind of [go] nuts" with the final design. Andrews took inspiration from the Cthulhu Mythos for the creature, feeling "the more tentacles, the better". Some commentators believed the creature was the Marvel Comics character Shuma-Gorath, but Meinerding said they were not adapting any specific comic book character for the design.

=== Music ===
Composer Laura Karpman combined elements of existing MCU scores with original music for the series, specifically referencing elements of Alan Silvestri's Captain America: The First Avenger score for this episode. To represent Captain Carter, Karpman "flipp[ed the music] on its head" by inverting Silvestri's main Captain America theme to have descending notes whenever his went up. Karpman wanted the episode's score to sound like it had been written for a 1940s war film rather than a modern story about the 1940s. A soundtrack for the episode was released digitally by Marvel Music and Hollywood Records on August 13, 2021, featuring Karpman's score.

What If... Captain Carter Were the First Avenger? (Original Soundtrack)
No.	Title	Length
1.	"Main Title"	1:07
2.	"My Favorite Story...??"	1:39
3.	"A Lighter"	1:25
4.	"A New Hero"	0:56
5.	"Glorified Battery"	1:35
6.	"Attack of the Peggy"	2:02
7.	"What to Do"	0:45
8.	"You Owe Me a Dance"	1:39
9.	"Rescue"	1:04
10.	"Demands to a God"	1:22
11.	"You Are My Hero"	0:47
12.	"Tragic Fall"	2:29
13.	"Captain's Speech"	0:39
14.	"Assault to the Castle"	2:06
15.	"Growing Tentacles"	1:08
16.	"All Day"	1:44
17.	"She's Gone"	0:37
18.	"We Won the War"	0:38
Total length:		23:48

== Marketing ==
On August 3, 2021, Marvel announced a series of posters created by various artists to correspond with the episodes of the series, with the first poster featuring Captain Carter also revealed on August 3, designed by Freya Betts. An additional promotional poster featuring Captain Carter and a quote from the episode was revealed after the episode's release, with art by Matt Needle. Marvel also announced merchandise inspired by the episode as part of its weekly "Marvel Must Haves" promotion for each episode of the series, including apparel, accessories, Funko Pops, Marvel Legends, and Lego sets based on Captain Carter, the Hydra Stomper, and the Watcher.

== Reception ==
=== Audience viewership ===
The viewer tracking application Samba TV reported that the premiere was watched by an estimated 281,000 households in the United States on its release day. What If...? was the second-most streamed television series in the United States for the week ending August 15, 2021 according to JustWatch.

=== Critical response ===
The review aggregator website Rotten Tomatoes reported a 100% approval rating with an average score of 8/10 based on 9 reviews.

Sam Barsanti of The A.V. Club graded the episode "B+" and said it met all of his criteria for a good "what if" storyline, praising how the episode was able to deepen the existing relationship between Carter and Rogers, and finding the action scenes to have "more visual panache than pretty much anything in any of the live-action MCU adventures". He did question whether Bradley had "cheated" by adjusting additional elements from the film after the initial "what if" moment. Writing for GamesRadar+, Bradley Russell praised the episode's fresh take on the MCU and described it as a "surefire hit". He said the animation style was an "acquired taste" and compared some of the background characters to old video game graphics, but he felt the main characters looked "gorgeous" and said the "actual animation is wonderfully kinetic and often goes above and beyond what could have been achieved in live action". IGN's Tom Jorgensen gave the episode a 6 out of 10, enjoying the short runtime and finding the episode to be a good way to "ease viewers in" to the series since it does not make major changes to the film's story. He highlighted the action sequences but felt the animation style did not work as well for dialogue scenes.

Kirsten Howard at Den of Geek felt the episode was fun, but the audience's "mileage may vary" depending on their existing appreciation of Carter. She said it was a "delight" to see Carter's fights in the episode, with the animation in the action sequences achieving what live-action could not, but the animation style in general was not Howard's favorite and she wished the series had used different styles for different episodes like Love, Death & Robots. She also felt the episode's story was redundant for those who had seen the films. Angie Han of The Hollywood Reporter felt the episode was a "lovely idea [that] turned into a lukewarm Captain America: The First Avenger rehash, dusted with vague female empowerment themes". io9's Charles Pulliam-Moore described the episode as "falling into the familiar rhythms of a story about a Strong Female Character™ who rises up to take sexism down while also saving the day", and felt the degree of Flynn's sexism in the episode was comical. He did think that the episode's story allowed the best elements of Carter's personality to be highlighted, but concluded that he would like to see the series be more bold in future episodes rather than just retelling a film with slight differences. Writing for Rolling Stone, Alan Sepinwall said the episode was "an anomaly" compared to other episodes of the series because the change to having Carter take the serum did not alter much of the film's overall story, but he felt this worked because Carter is an appealing character and the animators were able to "go to town" with the action sequences.

Russell said Wright brought gravitas to the episode's narration, but had mixed thoughts on the returning MCU actors; he felt some were able to elevate the "already captivating script", such as Atwell, but others gave tired, one-note performances. Barsanti also praised Atwell, and additionally highlighted Whitford, but felt the rest of the cast was "mostly just fine", while Pulliam-Moore felt Atwell's performance sounded the most comfortable when compared to supporting actors such as Stan. Jorgensen called Atwell's performance "enthusiastic", praised Wright's as "delightfully Serlingesque", and believed Keaton's portrayal of Rogers was "totally cohesive" with Evans' version from the films.
