= Infinity Stones =

Items in the Marvel Cinematic Universe

- Marvel Cinematic Universe element
- The six Infinity Stones. From left to right: Time, Power, Space, Mind, Reality, and Soul
- First appearance: Thor; (2011)
- Based on: Infinity Gems by Marvel Comics
- Adapted by: Christopher Markus; Stephen McFeely
- Genre: Superhero fiction

In-universe information
- Owners: Thanos; Bruce Banner; Tony Stark

The Infinity Stones are fictional items in the Marvel Cinematic Universe (MCU) media franchise, based on the Infinity Gems of the Marvel Comics. As expounded across several interwoven MCU multimedia titles, the six Infinity Stones are reputed to embody and control essential aspects of existence—Space, Mind, Reality, Power, Time, and Soul—thereby making them critical artifacts in the MCU.

Thanos sets out to collect all six Stones to use them to wipe out half of all life in the universe, believing that his plan will save it from extinction. In 2018, Thanos accomplishes his goal and snaps his fingers while wearing the Infinity Gauntlet containing the Stones, causing the Blip. Thanos eventually uses the Stones again to destroy them and five years later, the surviving Avengers form a plan to go back in time to collect the Stones from other time periods to undo Thanos' snap. After defeating Thanos and bringing back everyone he snapped out of existence, Steve Rogers / Captain America returns the Stones to the exact moments in time that the Avengers collected them from.

Despite being destroyed, the Stones make appearances in the Multiverse Saga, including in Doctor Strange in the Multiverse of Madness (2022) in an alternate universe where Thanos was defeated on his home planet of Titan by the Illuminati before he can collect all of the Stones. They also make appearances in several of the MCU television series on Disney+, between flashbacks in WandaVision (2021) and alternate universes in the first season of Loki (2021) and the animated series What If...? (2021–24). Scientific studies relating to the Stones have been conducted, mostly since the release of Infinity War, including one focusing on the control of matter.

== Film chronology ==
The Stones, with the exception of the Soul Stone, made their debuts in films leading up to Avengers: Infinity War (2018).

The Space Stone, the first Stone to appear, was featured in a post-credit scene for Thor (2011), housed within the Tesseract. The Stone / Tesseract established its significance in the MCU through the following films, Captain America: The First Avenger (2011) and The Avengers (2012). In The First Avenger, the Red Skull uses the power of the Stone to power Hydra's weaponry during World War II. In The Avengers, Loki is sent to Earth by Thanos to get the Stone from S.H.I.E.L.D. The Space Stone did not make another appearance until Phase Three, when it made a minor appearance in Thor: Ragnarok (2017) and played a major role in Captain Marvel (2019) where it is revealed that the Stone gave Carol Danvers her powers.

The Mind Stone first showed up in The Avengers, housed in a scepter given to Loki in his efforts to get the Space Stone from Earth. The Stone is shown within the scepter in Avengers: Age of Ultron (2015) where it is being used on human test subjects. The Mind Stone is eventually used to give Vision life.

Thor: The Dark World (2013) introduced the Reality Stone in its liquid form known as the Aether. It temporarily infects Jane Foster before it is given to The Collector to keep it separate from the Space Stone.

The Power and Time Stones made their debuts in Guardians of the Galaxy (2014) and Doctor Strange (2016) respectively. Ronan the Accuser seeks out the Power Stone for Thanos, but keeps it for himself. He is defeated by the Guardians of the Galaxy, who entrust the Stone with the Nova Corps. Stephen Strange finds the Eye of Agamotto, which houses the Time Stone, and uses it to save Earth from the demon Dormammu.

The Soul Stone was the last Stone to make an appearance, first showing up in Infinity War when Thanos collects the Stone on Vormir after sacrificing Gamora.

== Fictional history ==
The stories of the Stones in the MCU take place in the Earth-616 universe. (Note: The main MCU universe was established to be Earth-616 in Doctor Strange in the Multiverse of Madness (2022).) The fictional information below includes events that happened with the Stones from more than one Earth-616 timeline, as well as events that happened with them in multiple other universes.

List of Infinity Stones
Name	Ability	Color	Gauntlet location	Container	First appearance
Space Stone	Create portals to teleport; telekinesis	Blue	Middle finger	Tesseract	Thor
Mind Stone	Control minds, enhance the user's intelligence, and create new life	Yellow	Back of hand	Loki's scepter (initially); Vision's forehead	The Avengers
Reality Stone	Alter reality	Red	Ring finger	Aether	Thor: The Dark World
Power Stone	Manipulate energy; increased strength	Purple	Index finger	Orb	Guardians of the Galaxy
Time Stone	Control and manipulate time	Green	Thumb	Eye of Agamotto	Doctor Strange
Soul Stone	Manipulate the soul of a person	Orange	Little finger	—N/a	Avengers: Infinity War

=== Creation ===
In 2014, the Collector explains that the Infinity Stones are the remnants of six singularities that existed before the Big Bang, which were compressed into Stones by cosmic entities after the universe began and which were dispersed throughout the cosmos. Four years later, it is further explained by Wong and Stephen Strange that each Infinity Stone embodies and controls an essential aspect of existence.

=== Events before Infinity War ===
==== Space Stone ====
At some point in time, the Tesseract, which contains the Space Stone, came into the possession of Odin, who hid it on Earth in the Norwegian village of Tønsberg, whose inhabitants were Asgardian worshippers. In 1942, during World War II, Johann Schmidt steals the Tesseract from a church in Tønsberg and uses it to power Hydra's weaponry. During Steve Rogers's final fight against Schmidt in 1943, the Tesseract transports the latter to the planet Vormir. Afterwards, the Tesseract falls into the Arctic Ocean, where it is later recovered by Howard Stark and taken into S.H.I.E.L.D.'s custody.

In 1989, Dr. Wendy Lawson unsuccessfully tries to use the Tesseract to unlock light-speed travel to help the Skrulls find a new home. However, her experiments result in Carol Danvers being granted superhuman strength, flight, and the ability to generate energy blasts. In 1995, Danvers eventually recovers the Tesseract and returns the object to S.H.I.E.L.D., but it is temporarily swallowed by a Flerken named Goose, who later vomits it out on Nick Fury's desk.

In 2011, Fury shows the Tesseract to Dr. Erik Selvig and recruits him to work with it. In 2012, the Tesseract suddenly opens a portal allowing for Loki to come through. Loki steals the Tesseract and later opens a wormhole, using it to transport the Chitauri army to New York City in an attempt to conquer Earth. After the Avengers repel the invasion, Thor returns the Tesseract to Asgard for safekeeping in Odin's vault, and it is used to repair the Bifrost. In 2018, Loki takes the Tesseract from the vault as they escape the destruction of Asgard (Ragnarok).

==== Mind Stone ====
The Stone is originally housed in a scepter in the possession of Thanos and the Other. It is lent to Loki in 2012 to help locate the Tesseract and conquer Earth with its ability to control people's minds and project energy blasts. After Loki's defeat, the scepter is handed over to S.H.I.E.L.D., after which it falls into the hands of secret Hydra leader Baron Wolfgang von Strucker. He uses it to experiment on people, including siblings Pietro and Wanda Maximoff; they are the only surviving subjects of Strucker's experiments. Von Strucker's experiments cause Pietro to gain superhuman abilities and amplify Wanda's powers. In 2015, Strucker's base is attacked by the Avengers, who take back the scepter. The Avengers discover that it contains the Mind Stone, which itself contains an artificial intelligence. Bruce Banner and Tony Stark integrate the AI into the computer program Ultron, who steals the scepter and removes the Stone to create a newly upgraded body. The Avengers steal the Mind Stone–infused body from Ultron and upload the A.I. J.A.R.V.I.S. into it, giving birth to the android Vision. From then on, the Mind Stone is embedded in Vision's forehead.

==== Reality Stone ====
Eons ago, Malekith attempted to use the Reality Stone, appearing in its fluid-like weapon state called the Aether, to destroy the Nine Realms. His plan was to return the universe to its pre-Big Bang state, only to be thwarted by Bor, who had it hidden on Earth. In 2013, Jane Foster becomes infected by the Aether after coming across its resting place. Malekith is awakened by the Aether's release and later draws it out of her. After Malekith is defeated by Thor, Sif and Volstagg, they seal the Aether in a lantern-like container and entrust it to the Collector on the planet Knowhere to keep it separate from the Tesseract, as they consider it unwise to have multiple Infinity Stones close to each other. The Aether, once bonded to a host, can turn anything into dark matter, as well as suck the life force out of humans and other mortals. The Aether can also disrupt the laws of physics and repel threats if it senses any.

==== Power Stone ====
Housed in an Orb hidden in a secret temple on the abandoned planet Morag, the Power Stone is capable of increasing the user's strength and destroying entire civilizations with a single blast. However, the Stone is too much for most mortal beings to physically handle because its power will destroy them on contact. In 2014, Ronan the Accuser seeks the Orb for Thanos, but Peter Quill finds and steals the Orb from Morag's resting spot before Korath can. Ronan eventually steals it from the Guardians. After learning about the Power Stone, however, Ronan betrays Thanos and tries to use its destructive power to destroy the planet Xandar. During the battle to protect Xandar, by sharing the burden of the Power Stone's energy, the Guardians are able to use it to kill Ronan. It is later revealed that Peter Quill's half-Celestial physiology allowed him to withstand the Stone's power on his own for a brief time before the other Guardians joined him. They seal the Power Stone in a new Orb and entrust it to the Nova Corps on Xandar for safekeeping.

==== Time Stone ====
The Time Stone was found by Agamotto, Earth's first Sorcerer Supreme, who fashioned a containment device, the Eye of Agamotto, to harness its dangerous power.

In 2016, Dr. Stephen Strange discovers the Eye of Agamotto at Kamar-Taj and uses it to save the Earth from Dormammu by trapping him in a time loop until the demon abandons his plans for Earth. Strange returns the Eye of Agamotto to the Masters of the Mystic Arts' secret compound Kamar-Taj in Kathmandu, Nepal, but soon begins wearing it again.

==== Soul Stone ====
An object that has the ability to manipulate the soul and essence of a person, control life and death, and contains a pocket dimension called the Soul World. At some time in the past, Thanos tasks Gamora to find the Soul Stone, as there is little record of its existence compared to the other Infinity Stones. Gamora finds a map leading to where it was hidden: in a shrine on the planet Vormir, but chooses to destroy the map and not tell Thanos. She only tells Nebula of it and swears her to secrecy. However, they are unaware that Thanos wasn't fooled by their lies.

=== The Blip ===
Thanos begins his quest to collect all six Stones by decimating Xandar to obtain the Power Stone. He then tracks down the Space Stone and intercepts the Asgardian refugee ship the Statesman on its way to Earth after the destruction of Asgard. Thanos kills half of the occupants and threatens to kill Thor as well, but Loki gives up the Tesseract to save his brother's life. Thanos proceeds to crush the Tesseract to acquire the Space Stone. He tells his children to acquire the two Stones on Earth. He then uses the Power Stone to destroy the ship as he teleports his children and himself away with the Space Stone.

Thanos' four children split up, with two looking to collect the Time Stone from Doctor Strange and the other two going after Vision for the Mind Stone. In New York, Ebony Maw and Cull Obsidian attempt to steal the Time Stone from Strange, but are foiled by Tony Stark, Peter Parker, and Wong. Strange is teleported up to Maw's ship with Stark and Parker sneaking on board. In Edinburgh, Vision is injured by Proxima Midnight and Corvus Glaive in their attempts to get the Stone from his head. After the pair are defeated (with the help of Steve Rogers, Sam Wilson, and Natasha Romanoff), Vision is taken to Wakanda to have the Stone removed by Shuri, in the hope that Vision would be able to live without it.

While his children are on Earth, Thanos acquires the Aether from the Collector on Knowhere and turns it back into the Reality Stone, allowing for him to repel the Guardians of the Galaxy's attacks by turning Drax to rocks, Mantis into ribbon strips, and causing Peter Quill's gun to shoot bubbles. Thanos then teleports Gamora and himself back to his ship, where he is keeping a captured Nebula. He uses the Power Stone to torture her in front of Gamora, forcing Gamora to agree to take him to Vormir to find the Soul Stone. On Vormir, they encounter the Stone keeper, the Red Skull. Thanos reluctantly sacrifices Gamora to fulfill the requirements to obtain the Soul Stone once the Red Skull explains to them that the Stone requires the sacrifice of a loved one to earn it.

Parker and Stark kill Maw by getting him sucked out of an airlock. His ship takes Stark, Strange, and Parker to Titan, Thanos' home planet, where they run into Quill, Drax, and Mantis. Before Thanos arrives, Strange uses the Time Stone to look into future timelines and view millions of possible outcomes of their conflict, learning of only one future in which they win. Thanos arrives expecting Maw, and fights the Avengers and Guardians using the Stones. He defeats them all, leading Strange to surrender the Time Stone to prevent Thanos from killing Stark to ensure the winning future comes to pass.

A surge of energy goes through Thanos' body after he adds the Mind Stone into the Infinity Gauntlet, which is the final Stone he needed before the Blip.

Thanos' remaining children arrive in Wakanda, where Shuri is unable to complete the removal of the Mind Stone from Vision's head before she is attacked by Glaive. Thanos arrives looking to get the Stone himself, using some of the Stones against the Avengers and Wakandans trying to fight him off. As a result of the Stone still being in Vision's head, Wanda is forced to destroy Vision and the Stone to try to prevent Thanos from getting it, only for Thanos to use the Time Stone to repair them both and collect the latter. Thanos uses all of the Stones to initiate the Blip, exterminating half of all living things in the universe, chosen at random. He is briefly transported into the Soul World and encounters a vision of a young Gamora. He then teleports away with the Space Stone to the Garden. Thanos uses the Stones to destroy them to prevent further use in the future.

=== Time heist ===
After Scott Lang is freed from the Quantum Realm five years after the Blip, he goes to the Avengers Compound and brings up the idea of a time heist using the Quantum Realm to collect each Stone from different points in time as changing the past does not change the future and instead creates alternate timelines. The surviving Avengers split up into teams to each focus on one Stone.

Rogers, Stark, Lang, and Banner travel to an alternate 2012, where the Space, Mind, and Time Stones are all located. Stark and Lang attempt to steal the 2012 Tesseract, but the 2012 Hulk accidentally knocks Stark down and the 2012 Tesseract is taken by the 2012 Loki, who uses it to open a wormhole and escape. Rogers retrieves the scepter containing the 2012 Mind Stone, using it to render his 2012 self unconscious after he mistook him for a disguised Loki. Banner convinces the Ancient One to relinquish that timeline's Time Stone, promising to return it after they are done using it to ensure that the alternate timelines will survive. After failing to retrieve the 2012 Space Stone, Stark and Rogers travel to an alternate 1970 and take the 1970 Tesseract from Camp Lehigh, New Jersey and use a stolen briefcase to smuggle it out.

Thor and Rocket travel back to Asgard in an alternate 2013 to extract the 2013 Aether from the 2013 Jane Foster. James Rhodes and Nebula travel back to Morag in an alternate 2014, subduing the 2014 Peter Quill before taking the 2014 Power Stone in its Orb. Romanoff and Clint Barton travel to Vormir in an alternate 2014, where each attempts to sacrifice themselves to allow the other to return with the Stone, ultimately ending with Romanoff sacrificing herself.

All of the Stones are brought back to the present day and removed from their containers while the 2013 Aether is turned into its solid state. Stark creates a Nano Gauntlet to house the Stones, which Banner uses to undo the Blip. An alternate 2014 Thanos, having been alerted by their actions due to Nebula's cybernetic systems connecting with her 2014 self, brings his army to the future, destroying the compound and intending to use the Stones to destroy and recreate the universe out of revenge for the Blip being undone. In the ensuing battle, Stark sacrifices himself to disintegrate Thanos and his army with the Stones in the Nano Gauntlet. After Stark's funeral, Rogers returns all of the past Stones to the points in time that they were collected from.

==== Aftermath ====
Three weeks after Thanos' snap is undone, a still grieving Wanda Maximoff uses her connection with the Mind Stone to reanimate a fake Vision. Later on, Agatha Harkness shows Maximoff various points in her past, including the moment of Hydra's experimentation with the Stone on her. Maximoff learns that the exposure to the Stone tapped into and amplifyed her innate magic, as well as giving her a prophetic vision of her as the Scarlet Witch.

=== Alternate versions ===
Other versions of the Stones are depicted in the alternate realities of the MCU multiverse.

==== Loki ====
An alternate 2012 Loki, who escaped during the Avengers' attempt to collect all the Infinity Stones to undo Thanos' actions, has the alternate 2012 Tesseract confiscated by the Time Variance Authority (TVA). Later, Loki tries to retrieve the Tesseract only to find that it is powerless in the TVA, along with all the other Stones, in which the TVA has captured dozens of each from other timelines. The Stones are used as paperweights in the TVA, as such the founder of the TVA and his several Kang the Conqueror variants are more powerful than the Stones.

==== What If...? ====
Ultron in What If...? stores the Stones in his armor as opposed to using the Infinity Gauntlet.

In an alternate version of World War II, Howard Stark uses the confiscated Tesseract as the power source for the Hydra Stomper. In another universe, T'Challa, rather than Peter Quill, finds the Power Stone on Morag. In an alternate version of 2016, Stephen Strange attempts to use the Time Stone to prevent the death of Christine Palmer, only to find her death is an absolute point in his universe, meaning no matter what he does, she's destined to die, despite his countless attempts to avert the scenario. It becomes the only Stone left in existence in his universe due to his subsequent actions.

As one universe suffers from a quantum zombie outbreak, Vision discovers that his Mind Stone can be used to cure the infected. However, it is unable to cure the infected Maximoff, due to her powers coming from the Stone, prompting Vision to initially try and feed other survivors to Maximoff to keep her calm until he can properly cure her. When other heroes find him, Vision accepts that his actions are wrong and he gives the Stone to the surviving heroes to take to Wakanda, sacrificing himself out of guilt. However, a zombified Thanos arrives in Wakanda, possessing the other five Infinity Stones in his Gauntlet.

In another scenario, Thanos once again arrives on Earth with five Stones, only to discover that the Avengers lost to Ultron, who is in possession of Vision's vibranium body and the Mind Stone. Ultron kills Thanos and takes the Stones for himself, using them to conquer and destroy his universe. When this task is complete, Ultron attains a higher level of consciousness and uses the Stones to travel into other dimensions and duel the Watcher. To stop Infinity Ultron expanding into other universes, the Watcher assembles the Guardians of the Multiverse, a team of heroes from various alternate realities, including Strange Supreme, and gifts them a weapon to destroy the Stones called the Infinity Crusher. When the Crusher fails due to it being designed to only work for the Stones in its respective universe, the heroes kill Ultron by uploading Arnim Zola's analog consciousness into his body. The Stones are nearly taken by Killmonger, but he is stopped by Zola, who tries to take the Stones for himself. Strange Supreme and the Watcher imprison them along with the Stones in a pocket dimension, frozen outside of time so that neither they nor the Stones from Ultron's universe can be a threat anymore.

In Kahhori's universe, the Tesseract crashes into a lake in pre-colonial America after surviving Ragnarok and breaks, releasing unmitigated Space Stone energy into the lake's waters. As a result, a portal opens to another dimension called the Sky World, granting the inhabitants of that world incredible powers. After being transported into a dying universe in the year 1602, Captain Carter, with the help of Tony Stark, discovers a device powered by the Time Stone that had been caused when Steve Rogers, while fighting Thanos during the Battle of Wakanda, accidentally hit the Time Stone with one of his shields. Using Stark's device and the Time Stone, Carter and Rogers are able to set things right, returning Rogers to his own time and ending the temporal anomaly that was tearing apart the world. Among Doctor Strange Supreme's prisoners that are released by Captain Carter is a Thanos with a completed Infinity Gauntlet. However, having been freed by Carter, Killmonger (who won the battle against Zola) disintegrates Thanos with his own set of Infinity Stones. Kahhori is able to use her Tesseract-granted powers to separate Killmonger from his Infinity Armor and teleport him away, allowing Carter to take the Infinity Stones for herself. Carter is able to wield the Infinity Stones against Strange alongside Hela's crown and the weapons of some of the freed prisoners. By punching Strange with the Infinity Stones, Carter manages to bring him back to his senses temporarily.

In the last two episodes of season three, another set of Infinity Stones is seen wielded by an alternate version of Infinity Ultron, who had succeeded in destroying all life in his universe, but was left with no purpose. Carter requests for his help to rescue the Watcher before she is captured by the Eminence. Kahhori, Byrdie, and Storm later do the same, and Infinity Ultron agrees to help rescue Carter and the Watcher. During the battle against the Eminence, Incarnate, and Executioner, he sacrifices himself to allow the others to escape.

==== Doctor Strange in the Multiverse of Madness ====
On Earth-838, the Illuminati fight against Thanos on Titan who was in possession of five Infinity Stones. They kill him, leaving the gauntlet and the Stones in their responsibility.

==== Deadpool & Wolverine ====
Two variants of the Reality and Time Stones are shown to be embedded in a sling ring Cassandra Nova had taken from an unidentified variant of Stephen Strange. This allows her to open a portal from the Void to Earth-10005 and allow Deadpool and Wolverine to return to it. She later uses it to send the Deadpool Corps to that timeline to keep them from reaching her.

==== Marvel Zombies ====
In the third and fourth episodes, the zombie Thanos from What If...? is still shown wielding the five Stones, who eventually obtains the last one. Before he can snap, he is pushed by T'Challa into Wakanda's vibranium core, which destroys them both and the Stones, but also causes an explosion that threatens the universe until it is absorbed by Bruce Banner, turning him into Infinity Hulk. Wanda Maximoff later steals his powers and uses it to recreate the world into a more peaceful one.

== Infinity Gauntlet ==
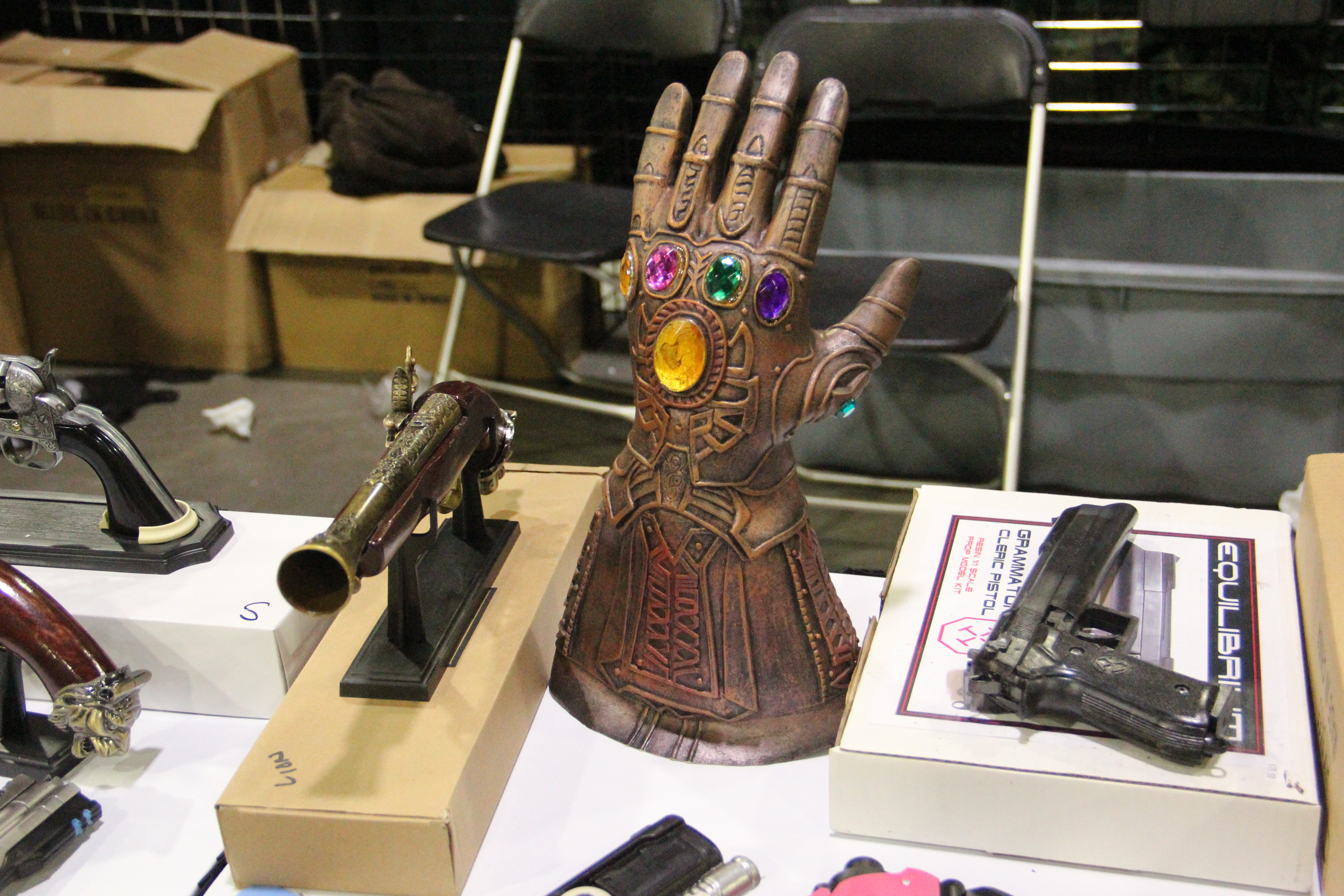
A model of the Infinity Gauntlet at the 2018 Atlanta Comic-Con

The Infinity Gauntlet is a left handed metal gauntlet used to house the six Stones. A right-handed gauntlet appears in Thor (2011), stored in Odin's vault, though this one was later revealed to be a fake by Hela in Thor: Ragnarok. The mid-credits scene of Avengers: Age of Ultron (2015) revealed Thanos had acquired a left-handed Infinity Gauntlet. In Infinity War, it is revealed Thanos invaded Nidavellir and forced Eitri to create the Infinity Gauntlet by threatening to kill his people, though he did so anyway once it was completed, as well as removing Eitri's hands to prevent his making of anything else. After obtaining all six Infinity Stones, Thanos snaps his fingers in the Gauntlet and erases half of all life in the universe.

In Endgame, the Gauntlet is revealed to be burnt and permanently bound to Thanos' swollen arm. After Thor kills Thanos, the charred damaged Gauntlet is left abandoned on the Garden planet. Five years later, Tony Stark, Bruce Banner, and Rocket use nanotechnology to create a right-handed Nano Gauntlet to use the alternate universe versions of the Infinity Stones. Banner in his "Smart Hulk" form, due to being the most immune to the gamma radiation that the Infinity Stones' combined powers emit, uses the Nano Gauntlet to reverse the Blip. However, the strain of channeling the combined powers still causes him considerable pain and leaves him with a crippled right arm. During the battle at the Avengers Compound, an alternate variant of Thanos from 2014 attempts to use the Nano Gauntlet. Although he successfully acquires it, Stark magnetically removes the Stones from the Nano Gauntlet and, wielding a makeshift Gauntlet formed within his armor, uses them to erase Thanos, his army, and the Nano Gauntlet. The original Gauntlet appears in flashback sequences from Infinity War in WandaVision (2021).

Alternate versions of the Infinity Gauntlet made brief appearances in What If...?, first in the fifth episode, when a zombified Thanos shows up in Wakanda, and the eighth episode when Thanos arrives on Earth but is swiftly killed by Ultron. The Gauntlet returns in a small capacity during the second season of What If...?, appearing in the last two episodes. In the season's penultimate episode, Steve Rogers unwillingly strikes the Time Stone while fighting Thanos and in the final episode where the Gauntlet is used by another version of Thanos, who is then killed by Killmonger. A Gauntlet appears in a flashback sequence in Doctor Strange in the Multiverse of Madness (2022) after Thanos is killed on Titan by the Illuminati.

The same Infinity Gauntlet wielded by Zombie Thanos from What If...? returns in the third episode of Marvel Zombies. After Zombie Thanos collects that last Stone, he tries to snap, but is stopped by T'Challa, who sacrifices himself to destroy Zombie Thanos.

== Background and development ==
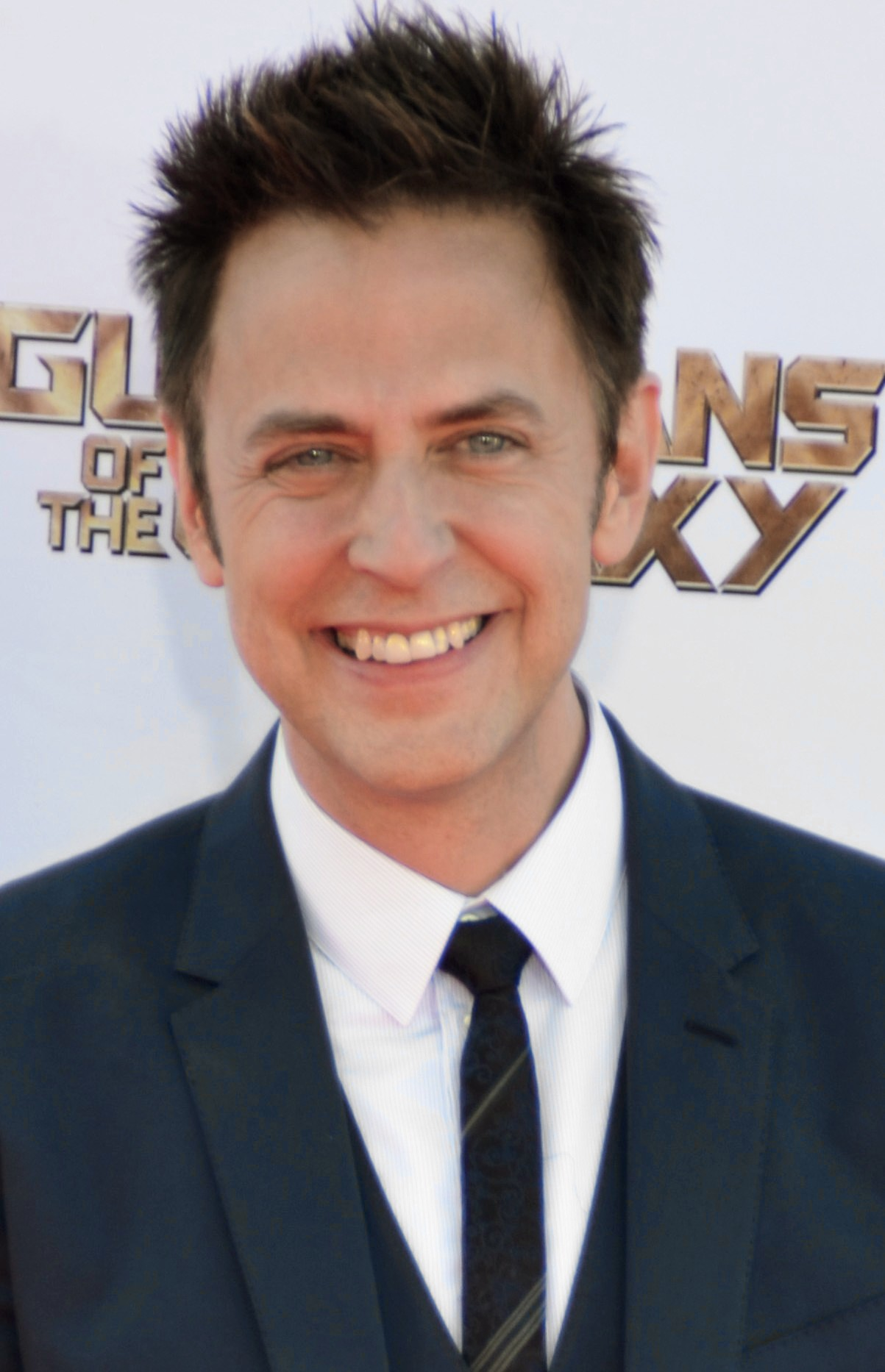
James Gunn came up with the backstory of the Stones while writing the script for Guardians of the Galaxy.

The Infinity Stones played a big role in the Marvel Cinematic Universe's Infinity Saga, but they were not the original story plan. Despite the Space Stone being introduced in Thor, and the Mind Stone and Thanos debuting in The Avengers, there were no official plans until at least 2012 to make the Stones the MacGuffins of the Saga. James Gunn revealed that it was not until after he completed his first draft for Guardians of the Galaxy (2014) that Marvel Studios decided to put a bigger focus on the Stones moving forward. Gunn revealed during the press tour for Guardians of the Galaxy Vol. 3 (2023) that he wrote the scene introducing the Stones' backstory in an hour and a half starting with the Power Stone being in possession of the Collector at the time. The Power Stone's color had to be changed from red like it is in the comics, to purple in the middle of development on Guardians of the Galaxy because Marvel decided that the Aether was going to be the Reality Stone.

== Differences from the comics ==
In the comics, Thanos is motivated to retrieve and use the Infinity Gems to impress Lady Death as she believed that the universe was overpopulated and headed for mass extinction. In the films, there is no mention of Lady Death, and Thanos wishes to reduce the population to avoid a repeat of his experience on Titan. Thanos retrieved each gem from a being who held it at the time. The In-Betweener had the Soul Gem, the Champion of the Universe had the Power Gem, the Gardener had the Time Gem, the Collector had the Reality Gem, the Runner had the Space Gem, and the Grandmaster had the Mind Gem. Furthermore, nobody else was even aware of Thanos, therefore no one attempted to stop him.

In the comics, the gems had other rules, and simply being in possession of one was not good enough. Each gem was powered by mastering a primordial force characterized by one of the other gems. For example, mastering the Power Gem was dependent on the user's mastery of the mind, while mastery of the soul correlated with the power of the Mind Gem. The colors of the stones were originally different in the comics. They were purple for Space, yellow for Reality, red for Power, blue for Mind, orange for Time, and green for Soul. The stone colors were updated in the Marvel Legacy series to match the film versions. In the MCU, the Time Stone is housed in the Eye of Agamotto and the Space Stone is housed in the Tesseract. However, the Marvel Comics versions of these two stones have no connections to these relics.

== Reception and popular culture ==
The existence of the Infinity Stones in the MCU has been described as the "one driving force that unifies all the robot-alien-hero fighting" by The Verge. The use of the Infinity Stones as a plot device led to fan speculation as to the location of as-yet undiscovered Stones, and the possible appearance of additional Stones. One theory popular with fans was that words describing the nature or location of the Stones spelled out the name "THANOS", and that the as-yet undiscovered Soul Stone was somehow associated with the character Heimdall. Another theory proposed prior to the release of Endgame was that it would involve a seventh Infinity Stone corresponding to an additional Infinity Gem from the comics, the Ego Stone.

Charles Pulliam-Moore of Gizmodo thought that the Soul Stone was the least interesting Stone because unlike the others, it was never given a chance to show why it can be formidable on its own like the other Stones had a chance to do in previous MCU films. However, during the Infinity War directors commentary, they confirmed that the Stone has some of the elements of its comic counterpart including "conjuring the spiritual representations of the dead on another plane of existence".

At San Diego Comic-Con in 2022, Marvel and East Continental Gems announced the Infinity Collection of Gemstones, a set of six Gem stones representing each Stone and displayed in an Infinity Gauntlet created by Gentle Giant Ltd. All six gems combined are over 150 carats and valued at USD $25 million. Each Stone is represented by different gems: The Time Stone is a Colombian emerald nearing 23 carats, the Space Stone is a sapphire from Madagascar, with over 30 carats, the Reality Stone is a natural ruby from Mozambique, Africa with over 15 carats, the Power Stone is a natural amethyst with more than 35 carats, the Soul Stone is spessartite, exceeding 35 carats, and the Mind Stone is a cut yellow diamond, that's close to 35 carats. After Infinity War released in theaters, Hot Toys unveiled a 1:1 scale Infinity Gauntlet with the Stones capable of lighting up with the use of embedded LED lights. Lego also released their own Infinity Gauntlet set in 2021 to celebrate the Infinity Saga.

The Snap and the Blip entered the popular lexicon as a metaphor for the idea of unilaterally bringing into being one's desired goals through one's force of will alone. In a November 30, 2023, article for SFGate, columnist Drew Magary reacted to the conduct of billionaire entrepreneur and Twitter owner Elon Musk, who contended that large advertisers who left Twitter after Musk had praised a tweet espousing the Great Replacement theory as "the actual truth" would be to blame if their exodus bankrupted that company, rather than Musk himself. When New York Times contributor Andrew Ross Sorkin stated that those advertisers would likely dispute this, Musk replied, "Tell it to Earth." Taking a critical view of this position, Magary, wrote:

"But Musk, who told Sorkin that he believed data to be more valuable than gold, remains committed to the idea that owning X means owning the chief information exchange for all of this planet's 8 billion citizens. He thinks he can Thanos Snap wars and recessions into being merely by posting a recycled Pepe the Frog meme from 2016 on there. There is no reasoning with someone who is so megalomaniacal and so, SO stupid."

== Scientific analysis and accuracy ==
A 2018 article in Extreme Mechanics Letters proposed that Thanos would have needed "a minimum grip strength of over 40,000 tons, which is approximately 750,000 times that of a typical man", to break the Tesseract depicted in the film, presuming that the object was an "all-carbon nano-tesseract or hypercube projected into 3D space". A study published in 2020 focused on the ability to control matter as Thanos does while using the Stones. The researchers found that on a macroscopic level, someone would need a large amount of energy to control matter, similarly to the Stones. However, microscopicly scientists can mimic Thanos' control of matter at the colloidal level. The researchers were able to make billions of colloidal particles with changeable responsiveness, patchiness, shapes, and sizes by manipulating them using triggers, including temperature, pH, and light.
