= What If...? (TV series) =

2021–2024 Marvel Studios animated series

- Logo for the first two seasons
- Genre: Action-adventure; Anthology; Science fiction; Superhero
- Created by: A. C. Bradley
- Based on: Marvel Comics
- Voices of: Jeffrey Wright
- Music by: Laura Karpman; Nora Kroll-Rosenbaum
- Country of origin: United States
- Original language: English
- No. of seasons: 3
- No. of episodes: 26

Production
- Executive producers: A. C. Bradley; Bryan Andrews; Victoria Alonso; Louis D'Esposito; Kevin Feige; Brad Winderbaum; Dana Vasquez-Eberhardt
- Producers: Carrie Wassenaar; Danielle Costa; Dana Vasquez-Eberhardt; Alex Scharf
- Animators: Stephan Franck; Scott Wright
- Editors: Graham Fisher; Joel Fisher; Anton Capaldo-Smith
- Running time: 30–37 minutes
- Production company: Marvel Studios Animation

Original release
- Network: Disney+
- Release: August 11, 2021 – December 29, 2024

Related
- Marvel Zombies; Marvel Cinematic Universe television series

What If...? is an American animated anthology television series created by A. C. Bradley for the streaming service Disney+, based on the Marvel Comics series of the same name. It is the fourth television series in the Marvel Cinematic Universe (MCU) from Marvel Studios, the first animated series from the studio, and the first series produced by Marvel Studios Animation. The series explores alternate timelines in the multiverse that show what would happen if major moments from the MCU films occurred differently. Bradley served as head writer for the first two seasons, with Matthew Chauncey taking over for the third, and Bryan Andrews as the lead director.

Jeffrey Wright stars as the Watcher, who narrates the series, alongside many MCU film actors reprising their roles. Marvel Studios was developing the series for Disney+ by the end of 2018, with Bradley and Andrews on board. It was officially announced in April 2019. Marvel Studios' head of visual development Ryan Meinerding helped define the series' cel-shaded animation style, which was designed to reflect the films and take inspiration from classic American illustrators. Animation for the series was provided by Flying Bark Productions and Stellar Creative Lab, with Blue Spirit and Squeeze also working on the first season and SDFX Studios working on the second. Stephan Franck was head of animation for the first season and a director on the second and third seasons, with Scott Wright as head of animation for the second and third seasons. Chauncey was the series' story editor before replacing Bradley as head writer.

The first season of What If...? premiered on August 11, 2021, and ran for nine episodes until October 6, as part of Phase Four of the MCU. The second season was released daily from December 22 to 30, 2023, and the third and final season premiered on December 22, 2024, also released daily; both are part of Phase Five. The series has received generally positive reviews, with praise for the voice acting, animation, creative storylines, and scenarios, although the episodes' length and writing received some criticism. An interactive augmented and virtual reality story for the Apple Vision Pro headset, What If...? – An Immersive Story, was released in May 2024, and a spin-off series titled Marvel Zombies premiered in September 2025. Three additional Zombies specials are scheduled for release yearly in 2027, 2028, and 2029.

== Premise ==
Following the establishment of the multiverse in the first-season finale of Loki, What If...? explores various alternate timelines across the multiverse in which major moments from the Marvel Cinematic Universe (MCU) films occur differently, as observed by the Watcher. In the second season, following the formation of the Guardians of the Multiverse, the Watcher continues to explore more strange worlds, meeting new heroes and keeping the multiverse safe.

== Episodes ==
| Season | Episodes | Originally released | |
| Season | Episodes | First released | Last released |
|---|---|---|---|
| 1 | 9 | August 11, 2021 | October 6, 2021 |
| 2 | 9 | December 22, 2023 | December 30, 2023 |
| 3 | 8 | December 22, 2024 | December 29, 2024 |

=== Season 1 (2021) ===
| No. overall | No. in season | Title | Directed by | Written by | Original release date |
|---|---|---|---|---|---|
| 1 | 1 | "What If... Captain Carter Were the First Avenger?" | Bryan Andrews | A. C. Bradley | August 11, 2021 |
| 2 | 2 | "What If... T'Challa Became a Star-Lord?" | Bryan Andrews | Matthew Chauncey | August 18, 2021 |
| 3 | 3 | "What If... the World Lost Its Mightiest Heroes?" | Bryan Andrews | A. C. Bradley & Matthew Chauncey | August 25, 2021 |
| 4 | 4 | "What If... Doctor Strange Lost His Heart Instead of His Hands?" | Bryan Andrews | A. C. Bradley | September 1, 2021 |
| 5 | 5 | "What If... Zombies?!" | Bryan Andrews | Matthew Chauncey | September 8, 2021 |
| 6 | 6 | "What If... Killmonger Rescued Tony Stark?" | Bryan Andrews | Matthew Chauncey | September 15, 2021 |
| 7 | 7 | "What If... Thor Were an Only Child?" | Bryan Andrews | A. C. Bradley | September 22, 2021 |
| 8 | 8 | "What If... Ultron Won?" | Bryan Andrews | Matthew Chauncey | September 29, 2021 |
| 9 | 9 | "What If... the Watcher Broke His Oath?" | Bryan Andrews | A. C. Bradley | October 6, 2021 |

=== Season 2 (2023) ===
| No. overall | No. in season | Title | Directed by | Written by | Original release date |
|---|---|---|---|---|---|
| 10 | 1 | "What If... Nebula Joined the Nova Corps?" | Stephan Franck | Matthew Chauncey | December 22, 2023 |
| 11 | 2 | "What If... Peter Quill Attacked Earth's Mightiest Heroes?" | Bryan Andrews | Matthew Chauncey | December 23, 2023 |
| 12 | 3 | "What If... Happy Hogan Saved Christmas?" | Bryan Andrews | A. C. Bradley & Matthew Chauncey | December 24, 2023 |
| 13 | 4 | "What If... Iron Man Crashed into the Grandmaster?" | Bryan Andrews | A. C. Bradley | December 25, 2023 |
| 14 | 5 | "What If... Captain Carter Fought the Hydra Stomper?" | Bryan Andrews | A. C. Bradley | December 26, 2023 |
| 15 | 6 | "What If... Kahhori Reshaped the World?" | Bryan Andrews | Ryan Little | December 27, 2023 |
| 16 | 7 | "What If... Hela Found the Ten Rings?" | Bryan Andrews | Matthew Chauncey | December 28, 2023 |
| 17 | 8 | "What If... the Avengers Assembled in 1602?" | Bryan Andrews | A. C. Bradley & Ryan Little | December 29, 2023 |
| 18 | 9 | "What If... Strange Supreme Intervened?" | Bryan Andrews | Matthew Chauncey | December 30, 2023 |

=== Season 3 (2024) ===
| No. overall | No. in season | Title | Directed by | Written by | Original release date |
|---|---|---|---|---|---|
| 19 | 1 | "What If... the Hulk Fought the Mech Avengers?" | Stephan Franck | Story by : A. C. Bradley and Bryan Andrews; Teleplay by : Ryan Little | December 22, 2024 |
| 20 | 2 | "What If... Agatha Went to Hollywood?" | Bryan Andrews | Story by : Bryan Andrews, Matthew Chauncey, and Ryan Little; Teleplay by : Matthew Chauncey and Ryan Little | December 23, 2024 |
| 21 | 3 | "What If... the Red Guardian Stopped the Winter Soldier?" | Bryan Andrews | A. C. Bradley | December 24, 2024 |
| 22 | 4 | "What If... Howard the Duck Got Hitched?" | Stephan Franck | Story by : Bryan Andrews, Matthew Chauncey, and Ryan Little; Teleplay by : Matthew Chauncey and Ryan Little | December 25, 2024 |
| 23 | 5 | "What If... the Emergence Destroyed the Earth?" | Stephan Franck | Story by : Bryan Andrews, Matthew Chauncey, and Ryan Little; Teleplay by : Matthew Chauncey and Ryan Little | December 26, 2024 |
| 24 | 6 | "What If... 1872?" | Stephan Franck and Bryan Andrews | Story by : Bryan Andrews, Matthew Chauncey, and Ryan Little; Teleplay by : Matthew Chauncey and Ryan Little | December 27, 2024 |
| 25 | 7 | "What If... the Watcher Disappeared?" | Stephan Franck | Story by : Bryan Andrews, Matthew Chauncey, and Ryan Little; Teleplay by : Matthew Chauncey and Ryan Little | December 28, 2024 |
| 26 | 8 | "What If... What If?" | Bryan Andrews | Teleplay by : Matthew Chauncey and Ryan Little; Story by : Bryan Andrews, Matthew Chauncey, and Ryan Little | December 29, 2024 |

== Cast and characters ==
The series is narrated by Jeffrey Wright as the Watcher, a member of the alien Watcher race who observes the multiverse, in a similar role to Rod Serling's in The Twilight Zone. Head writer A. C. Bradley said the character is "above everything else" and compared him to a viewer of the "pizza rat" video, observing and not interfering as he has "no interest in becoming friends with the rat, living amongst the rat, or doing rat things... That is the Watcher's relationship with humanity." Executive producer Brad Winderbaum felt Wright's performance inspired a sense of humanity to the character, and Bradley explained that Wright was cast because his voice mixes power, charisma, and authority with a "warm personality". Wright approached the character like he would a live-action role, learning as much as he could about the Watcher so his voice could reflect the character's "uniquely powerful, all-seeing, sagely presence". Wright chose a contemporary American accent rather than having the character sound like "some Oxford-educated, old, fusty guy in a tudor parlor somewhere", and aside from researching the character's comic book appearances, took inspiration from the series' tone, visuals, and animation when developing the character's voice.

For the second season, Wright was able to see how his performance played with animation for the first-season episodes, allowing him to make some adjustments to his performance such as adding "a bit more mystery to the voice and a bit more distance" to further the notion that the Watcher is "not entirely present". The third season further explores the character's humanity, with Winderbaum calling it a "fulfilling culmination" for the character, and saying the Watcher "presents himself as uncaring, and cold, and just an observer, but he cares more than everybody". The comic book name "Uatu" is not used at the start of the series because this would imply that there was more than one being watching the series' events when Bradley instead wanted to focus on the narrative of "the Watcher" observing the different characters and realities and how those affect him. The third season introduces additional members of the Watcher race–the Eminence, the Incarnate, and the Executioner–and reveals Wright's Watcher is named Uatu.

More than 50 actors reprise their MCU film roles in the first season, while over 30 reprise their roles in the second season, and over 35 reprise their roles in the third.

== Production ==
=== Development ===
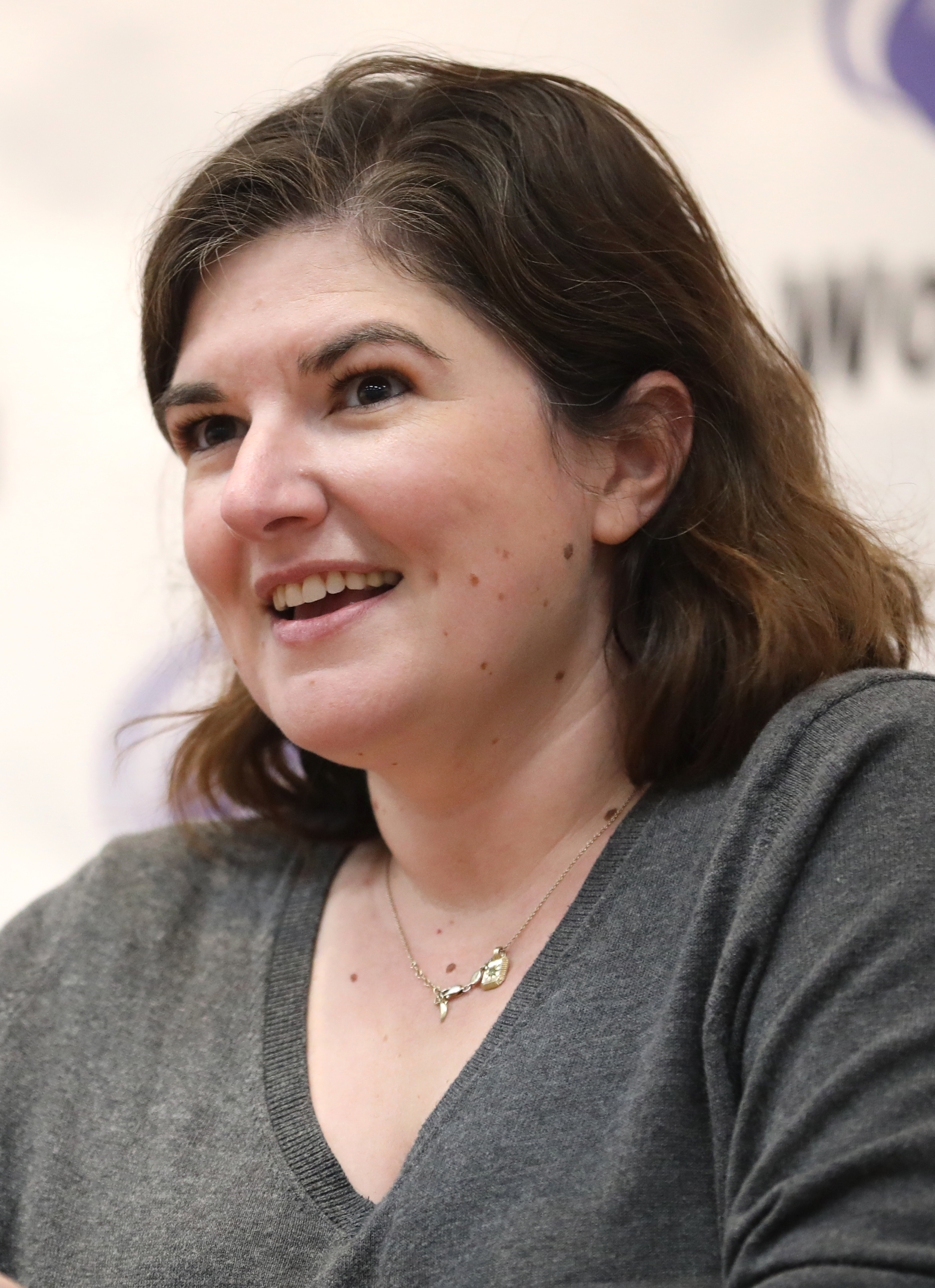
A. C. Bradley, the creator and head writer of What If...?

By September 2018, Marvel Studios was developing several series for its parent company Disney's streaming service, Disney+; Marvel Studios President Kevin Feige was set to take a "hands-on role" in each series' development, focusing on "handling" the actors who would be reprising their roles from the Marvel Cinematic Universe (MCU) films. One of these was an animated series for Disney+ based on the Marvel Comics run What If...?, which entered development in 2018. The anthology series, which would be produced by Feige, would explore how the MCU would be altered if certain events had occurred differently, such as if Loki wielded Thor's hammer Mjolnir. The hope was to have the actors who portray the characters in the MCU films voice them in the series as well. A. C. Bradley was suggested as head writer for the series by Marvel Studios executive Jonathan Schwartz after unsuccessfully pitching as a writer for Captain Marvel (2019). Bradley was eager to write a Marvel film due to her love for the franchise, and felt What If...? was her opportunity to create many Marvel stories. Marvel Studios was impressed that some of Bradley's ideas for the series matched concepts they were planning for films, and she joined the project in October 2018. One of the concepts Marvel had devised that they asked Bradley to pitch on was what would happen if a 1980s Avengers team formed after a young Peter Quill came back to Earth; this concept would eventually be evolve into the second season episode, "What If... Peter Quill Attacked Earth's Mightiest Heroes?". Bryan Andrews, a storyboard artist on many of the major action sequences from the MCU films, met with Brad Winderbaum—the Marvel Studios executive in charge of the series—about directing the series as early as 2018. Bradley and Andrews were officially announced in their roles in August 2019.

In April 2019, Disney and Marvel officially announced the series. Marvel Studios had discussed adapting the What If...? comics in the past, but decided not to do so until after the conclusion of the Infinity Saga so they would have enough storylines to create alternate options of. Making the series animated allowed the studio to explore all of these ideas "unbounded". Winderbaum said it was not a coincidence that the series was set for release so soon after the first-season finale of Loki, which introduced the multiverse, since What If...? explores facets of the multiverse in a way that Winderbaum believed made the series as important as any other MCU property; Bradley confirmed that all episodes of the series are canon to the MCU multiverse, with most of the episodes taking place in their own universe. The creative team of What If...? met with Loki executive producers Stephen Broussard and Kevin R. Wright as well as WandaVision (2021) co-executive producer Mary Livanos to establish a "rule book" regarding the multiverse, its branch timelines, and nexus events.

The episodes are approximately 30 minutes in length, though Marvel Studios had originally told Bradley and Andrews to aim for 35 to 40-minute episodes; early production issues for the series resulted in the reduced run time. In December 2019, Feige revealed that the first season would consist of 10 episodes, and that work had already begun on a second 10-episode season. However, because of the production delays caused by the COVID-19 pandemic, an episode of the first season was not completed in time and was moved to the second season, bringing the first season to nine episodes; the second season was also reduced to nine episodes. Work on a third season began by July 2022, when Bradley revealed that the second season was her final project with Marvel Studios. Story editor Matthew Chauncey takes over as head writer for the third season, which was announced in August 2024 to be the series' last, and consists of eight episodes. A Red Guardian-centered episode written by Bradley that was intended for the second season was released in the third. Stephan Franck joined Andrews as director for the second and third seasons. In November 2024, Winderbaum explained that the series was ending due to "bigger [MCU] reasons" that were being determined in real time as different projects were released within the Multiverse Saga. He said it was the right time for the series to conclude "from a story perspective", but did not rule out reviving it in the future.

Executive producers for the series include Winderbaum, Feige, Louis D'Esposito, Victoria Alonso, Andrews, Bradley, and Dana Vasquez-Eberhardt, with Carrie Wassenaar, Danielle Costa, and Alex Scharf producing. In July 2021, ahead of the release of What If...?, Alonso noted that Marvel Studios was creating an "animation branch and mini studio", known as Marvel Studios Animation, to focus on more animated content beyond What If...?. During Marvel Studios Animation's panel at the 2022 San Diego Comic-Con, What If...? and the other projects discussed were introduced as being part of the "Marvel Animated Multiverse".

=== Writing ===
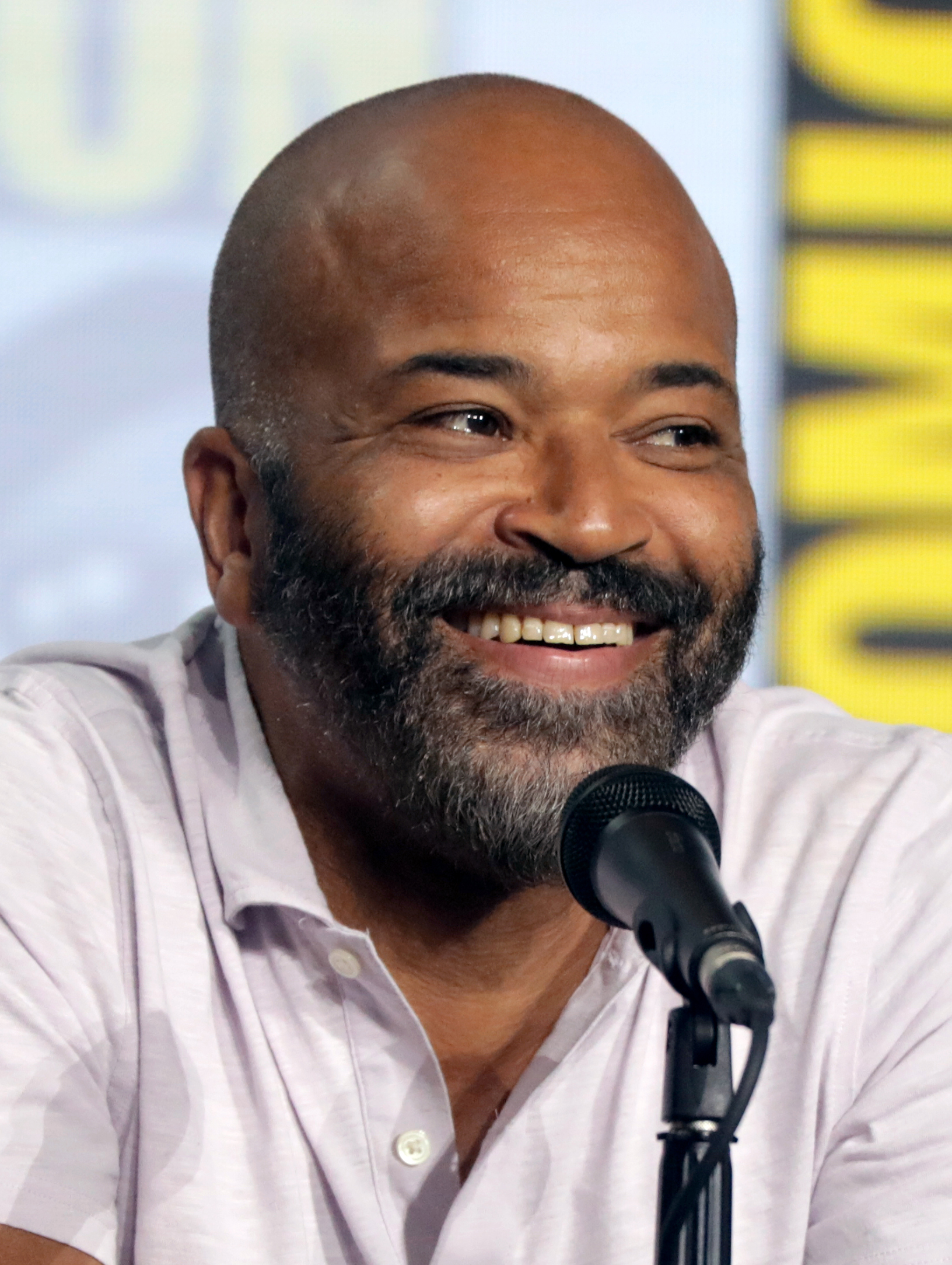
Jeffrey Wright stars as the Watcher, who narrates each episode of What If...?

Feige explained with the series' announcement that it would take "pivotal moments" from throughout the MCU and change them. Winderbaum felt it was "creatively healthy" to think of What If...? as its own parallel world that "lives and breathes on its own terms" and did not need to have exact adaptions from the main MCU or comics. He added that it was liberating to work within the multiverse concept because the series could take greater risks or opportunities that other MCU projects are not afforded when they are concerned with connecting to future properties. Alonso said the series was an opportunity to introduce more diversity to the MCU and take advantage of more of the 6,000 characters that Marvel Studios had access to. Marvel Comics characters who have yet to appear in the MCU are not introduced in the series, but the writers considered creating new characters if it helped the story. For example, Sam Wilson / Captain America could not be included in the first two seasons because the scripts were written before The Falcon and the Winter Soldier (2021) had aired, with Bradley noting it "makes sense, you let the character live in live-action first and then go play in the multiverse"; Wilson's Captain America later appeared in the third season. Regarding new characters, this was first done in the second season with the introduction of Kahhori, a young Mohawk woman in an alternate timeline who seeks to discover her new-found powers after the Tesseract crash-lands in the Haudenosaunee Confederacy in pre-colonial America where European colonization has not occurred.

Writing for the first season began in 2018, with the story arcs for the second season conceived during brainstorming sessions in 2019, ahead of writing for the season between January and October 2020. Each episode had an approximately 40-page script when first written. Because of the long-lead production for animation, there was not an opportunity for audience reactions to the first season to impact the creatives' work on the second season. Some of the initial 30 concepts that were not chosen for the first season also appear in future seasons. Episodes of the series were written by Bradley, Chauncey, and Ryan Little. Bradley stated that the first season was requested to highlight the "headliner" characters, such as Tony Stark, Black Panther, and Doctor Strange, as well as to only explore "what if" concepts for MCU stories from the Infinity Saga; as such, Phase Four characters do not appear until the second season, with Bradley and the writers also focusing more on the "scrappy", second string characters of the franchise such as Nebula, Darcy, and Hela. Andrews noted that following the first season, in which the "what if" concept were only small changes from what was established, further seasons were able to "expand out" beyond these small moments and "get a little bit wackier". As the writers were developing the initial scripts, they realized that Captain Carter would "bubble up and became more important" alongside the Watcher, and decided to revisit her story in each future season.

Each episode and its alternate storyline is introduced and concluded by the Watcher, presenting it as "a cautionary tale in the spirit of The Twilight Zone". The episode's tones vary, with some being darker or lighter than the MCU films that they play-off. Despite the series' anthology format, the writers conceived a story device for the first season that allowed them to have some connectivity between the episodes; this begins to be revealed in the first season's eighth episode before the finale in the ninth, which saw the formation of the Guardians of the Multiverse, whose members were the various characters introduced in the preceding episodes. Along with Captain Carter, some of the storyline elements from the first season with Doctor Strange Supreme and the Watcher are continued in the second season, with Strange Supreme becoming the villain of the season.

=== Casting ===
Marvel's plan for the series was to have actors who portray characters in the MCU films reprise their roles in What If...?, with more than 50 doing so in the first season. Feige revealed half of these actors at San Diego Comic-Con in July 2019, along with Jeffrey Wright being cast as the Watcher, who narrates the series. The additional actors reprising their roles for the first season were revealed in August 2021. Several characters in the series are voiced by different actors than those who portrayed them in MCU films. Winderbaum attributed some of the replacements to scheduling conflicts with the original actors, and explained that the creatives did not want the series to be "defined by the actors we thought we could get". When casting replacements, they looked to prioritize the performance for this series over an actor sounding the same as the original. Winderbaum felt the series' exploration of the multiverse gave a "cerebral justification" for the different actors. Over 30 actors reprise their MCU roles in the second season, with some of the different, recast voice actors reprising their roles from the first season. Over 35 actors reprise their MCU roles in the third season.

=== Animation ===
The series features a cel-shaded animation style, with character likenesses based on the actors from the films such as Hayley Atwell for Captain Carter. During the writing of the first season, Captain Carter emerged as a prominent character who would go on to appear in each subsequent season.

The series features a cel-shaded animation style with character likenesses based on the actors from the films. Ryan Meinerding, the head of visual development at Marvel Studios, developed the animation style for the series with Andrews. They considered using different styles for each episode, or basing the look on comic art by Jack Kirby or Steve Ditko, before settling on a single style inspired by classic American illustrators such as J. C. Leyendecker, Norman Rockwell, Tom Lovell, and Mead Schaeffer. Andrews felt this resulted in a "kind of heroic, hyper-realized, super-idealized look that feels iconic" while not being "pushed or cartoony", while Meinerding felt this was a unique approach to translating cinematic superheroes into animation that took advantage of the medium's stylization without losing the realistic, "monumental and powerful" feeling of the films. Disney's Lady and the Tramp (1955) was also an influence due to its lack of "harsh line work" and because they felt it was "beautifully painted". Traditional 2D animation was considered but was abandoned when Marvel could not find studios who could handle the necessary work. Instead, the animation is "2.5D", with 3D models rendered with 2D lighting to appear like flat drawings. Andrews enjoyed the opportunity to mix his knowledge of animation with the MCU, believing there was "an embarrassment of riches" in the storytelling they were able to achieve.

Alonso said the medium of animation allowed Marvel Studios to work with new companies around the world. Stephan Franck serves as head of animation on the first season. Scott Wright serves as animation supervisor for the majority of the second season, with Franck joining Wright on the fourth episode, and serving as sole supervisor on the fifth. Wright returned as the animation supervisor for the third season. Flying Bark Productions and Stellar Creative Lab worked on all three seasons of the series, with Blue Spirit and Squeeze also working on the first season and SDFX Studios working on the second.

The series' opening title sequence was designed by Perception, who sought to emphasize the series' themes by displaying "the beauty and idea of space". The sequence draws inspiration from the work of film poster artist Bob Peak, particularly his artwork for Star Trek: The Motion Picture (1979) and Excalibur (1981), and uses imagery of glass shattering to symbolize the branching of the Sacred Timeline.

=== Music ===
By October 2020, Laura Karpman was set to compose music for the series, which she called "the perfect composer playground" since she was able to reference existing MCU scores but also deviate from them. Karpman and the producers were inspired by Alan Silvestri's approach to the Avengers: Endgame (2019) score for how to incorporate existing music from different MCU films. She explained that Silvestri weaved his own music into other composer's themes, and generally just touched on different elements from the existing music, so her approach for the series became "touch on [existing themes], then go on". Karpman had access to the sheet music and recordings of previous MCU scores but also adapted some elements by ear. For each episode, she looked at how the story aligned with the MCU, how it deviated from the MCU, and what the story itself required musically.

External audio
- Main Title (From "What If... Captain Carter Were the First Avenger?"/Audio Only) presents composer Laura Karpman's main theme for the series as heard on the first episode's soundtrack, YouTube audio-only video from MarvelMusicVevo's channel

When writing the series' main theme, Karpman knew that the opening sequence would feature images of shattered glass. She recorded the sound of shattering glass and manipulated it to create sound effects that were added to the theme. The main melody is played on a French horn, with Karpman singing in the background as a reference to 1960s science fiction scores that featured female vocalists. Additional choir is also used in the main theme, singing phrases backward such as "what if", "Marvel", and "Stan Lee". Soundtrack albums for each episode of the first season, featuring Karpman's score, were released digitally by Marvel Music and Hollywood Records from August 13 through October 13.

For the second season, Karpman was joined by her wife Nora Kroll-Rosenbaum. A five-track EP for the third episode, "What If... Happy Hogan Saved Christmas?", was released digitally on December 15, 2023. A soundtrack album for the season featuring selections of Karpman and Kroll-Rosenbaum's score was released digitally by Hollywood Records and Marvel Music on January 5, 2024. Karpman returned for the third season.

== Release ==
What If...? debuted on Disney+ on August 11, 2021; the first season consists of nine episodes that were released weekly until October 6. It is part of Phase Four of the MCU. Winderbaum said it was their intention to release a new season of What If...? annually. The second season premiered on December 22, 2023, and its nine episodes were released daily until December 30. The third and final season premiered on December 22, 2024, with its eight episodes being released daily until December 29. Both are part of Phase Five.

== Reception ==
=== Viewership ===
According to market research company Parrot Analytics, which looks at consumer engagement in consumer research, streaming, downloads, and on social media, What If...? was the most in-demand new series that debuted in the U.S. from July 1 to September 30, 2021, achieving 17.5 times more demand than the average show during that period. Internationally, it secured the eighth position in the ranking for the most-demanded digital series in Ecuador, achieving 2.11 times more demand than the average series, for the week of October 24–30, 2021.

According to the file-sharing news website TorrentFreak, What If...? was the sixth most-watched pirated television series of 2021, ranking behind Hawkeye. In 2022, Nielsen Media Research, which records streaming viewership on U.S. television screens, announced that What If...? and Star Wars: The Bad Batch each appeared on its streaming charts for a combined total of seven weeks from May to October, collectively accumulating approximately 2 billion minutes of viewing time.

What If...? held the title of Disney+'s biggest animated series premiere until it was surpassed by Dream Productions in 2024. The show remained among the most in-demand superhero series of 2024, according to Parrot Analytics. Whip Media, which tracks viewership data for the more than 25 million worldwide users of its TV Time app, reported that it featured in the top five of the most-streamed original series in the U.S. from the week ending December 29 to the week ending January 5, 2025.

=== Critical response ===
Critical response of What If...?
| Season | Rotten Tomatoes | Metacritic |
|---|---|---|
| 1 | 89% (123 reviews) | 69 (16 reviews) |
| 2 | 90% (29 reviews) | 79 (7 reviews) |
| 3 | 79% (29 reviews) | —N/a |

The review aggregator website Rotten Tomatoes reports an 89% approval rating with an average rating of 7.85/10, based on 123 reviews for the first season. The site's critical consensus reads: "What If...? may not add much to the larger MCU narrative, but surprising takes on beloved characters and some of the best action sequences in the entire franchise make for engaging viewing." Metacritic, which uses a weighted average, assigned the first season a score of 69 out of 100 based on 16 critics, indicating "generally favorable reviews".

The second season has a 90% approval rating on Rotten Tomatoes, based on 29 reviews, with an average rating of 7.7/10. The website's critics consensus states: "In its superlative sophomore season, What If...? reaffirms its status as one of the most consistently creative outposts in the sprawling MCU." Metacritic assigned the second season an average score of 79 out of 100, based on 7 critics, indicating "generally favorable" reviews.

The third season has a 79% approval rating on Rotten Tomatoes, based on 29 reviews, with an average rating of 6.7/10. The website's critics consensus states: "What If...?'s final slate of hypothetical adventures can be a mixed bag, but a satisfying through-line ensures that this series' overall worthiness doesn't end on a question mark."

=== Accolades ===
| Award | Date of ceremony | Category | Recipient(s) | Result | Ref. |
|---|---|---|---|---|---|
| American Cinema Editors Eddie Awards | March 5, 2022 | Best Edited Animation (Non-Theatrical) | Graham Fisher and Joel Fisher (for "What If... Ultron Won?") | Nominated | |
| Annie Awards | March 12, 2022 | Outstanding Achievement for Editorial in an Animated Television/Broadcast Production | Joel Fisher, Graham Fisher, Sharia Davis, Basuki Juwono, and Adam Spieckerman (for "What If... Ultron Won?") | Won | |
| Annie Awards | February 17, 2024 | Outstanding Achievement for Animated Effects in an Animated Television/Broadcast Production | Ryan Barringer, Rajkumar Gurudu, Bipin Kumar Patra, and Pranil Ravindra Mahajan (for "What If... Kahhori Reshaped the World?") | Nominated | |
| Annie Awards | February 17, 2024 | Outstanding Achievement for Production Design in an Animated Television / Broadcast Production | Paul Lasaine, Kristina Vardazaryan, Cynthia Halley, Ryan Magno, and Simon Dunsdon (for "What If... Nebula Joined the Nova Corps?") | Nominated | |
| Critics' Choice Television Awards | March 13, 2022 | Best Animated Series | What If...? | Won | |
| Dorian Awards | August 17, 2022 | Best Animated Show | What If...? | Nominated | |
| Golden Reel Awards | March 13, 2022 | Outstanding Achievement in Sound Editing – Non-Theatrical Animation | Mac Smith, Bill Rudolph, Alyssa Nevarez, Cheryl Nardi, Anele Onyekwere, Tom Kramer, John Roesch, and Shelley Roden (for "What If... Doctor Strange Lost His Heart Instead of His Hands?") | Nominated | |
| Golden Trailer Awards | October 7, 2022 | Most Innovative Advertising for a TV/Streaming Series | What If...? | Nominated | |
| Hollywood Critics Association TV Awards | August 14, 2022 | Best Streaming Animated Series or TV Movie | What If...? | Nominated | |
| Humanitas Prize | September 12, 2024 | Children's Teleplay | "What If... Hela Found the Ten Rings?" | Nominated | |
| Primetime Creative Arts Emmy Awards | September 3, 2022 | Outstanding Animated Program | "What If... Doctor Strange Lost His Heart Instead of His Hands?" | Nominated | |
| Primetime Creative Arts Emmy Awards | September 3, 2022 | Outstanding Character Voice-Over Performance | Chadwick Boseman (for "What If... T'Challa Became a Star-Lord?") | Won | |
| Primetime Creative Arts Emmy Awards | September 3, 2022 | Outstanding Character Voice-Over Performance | Jeffrey Wright (for "What If... Ultron Won?") | Nominated | |
| Primetime Creative Arts Emmy Awards | September 7, 2025 | Outstanding Character Voice-Over Performance | Jeffrey Wright (for "What If... 1872?") | Nominated | |
| Primetime Creative Arts Emmy Awards | September 7, 2025 | Outstanding Sound Editing for an Animated Program | Mac Smith, Vanessa Lapato, Alyssa Nevarez, Steve Bissinger, Derek McGinley, Anele Onyekwere, Carl Sealove, Andrea Stelter Gard, and Sean England (for "What If... 1872?") | Nominated | |
| Saturn Awards | October 25, 2022 | Best Animated Series | What If...? | Nominated | |

== Other media ==
=== Documentary special ===
In February 2021, the documentary series Marvel Studios: Assembled was announced. The special on this series, "The Making of What If...?", goes behind the scenes of the making of the first season, and was released on Disney+ on October 27, 2021.

=== What If...? – An Immersive Story ===
Wong is guided by the Watcher to assist the player in collecting Infinity Stones from throughout the multiverse. It is ultimately revealed that Wanda Maximoff is posing as the Watcher to collect the Stones and the player must join other multiversal allies to defeat her. After regaining possession of all the Infinity Stones, the player can choose to keep them and start a new timeline or destroy them to save the multiverse and be recruited as a Guardian of the Multiverse.

Voice actors include Amuche Chukudebelu as the Watcher, Daisuke Tsuji as Wong, Jamie Costa as Steve Rogers / Captain America, David Lodge as Red Guardian, Analise Scarpaci as Hela, Stephen Alcalá as Taneleer Tivan / Collector, Will Champion as Eros / Starfox and Vision, Stephanie Kerbis as Wanda Maximoff, Shelby Young as Miss Minutes, and Helen Sadler as Captain Carter. Archival footage of Ryan Reynolds as Wade Wilson / Deadpool from the MCU film Deadpool & Wolverine (2024) is used. Additional characters appearing are Bucky Barnes / Winter Soldier, Thanos, Carol Danvers, and Thaddeus Ross.

In May 2024, Marvel Studios and ILM Immersive announced What If...? – An Immersive Story, an hour-long interactive mixed reality Disney+ original story for the Apple Vision Pro headset. The story was directed by Dave Bushore and written by David Dong and Phil McCarty, which sees users encounter variants of MCU characters from throughout the multiverse, learn the mystic arts, and harness the power of the Infinity Stones. Bushore, Dong, and McCarty worked with the What If...? production team to create the new character variants seen in the experience. Bushore was excited to focus the "what if" scenario around Maximoff and Vision to help give the characters their "happy ending" that they have not gotten in the main MCU. Laura Karpman returned from the series to compose music for the experience, and series director Bryan Andrews served as a consulting producer. Executive producers include Bushore, Winderbaum, ILM Immersive's Shereif M. Fattouh, Vicki Dobbs Beck, and Mark S. Miller, and Walt Disney Studios' Jamie Voris. A trailer was released on May 22, with the experience made available as a free app on the Vision Pro for a limited time on May 30.

Wes Davis from The Verge described An Immersive Story as an "overlong, no-stakes video game tutorial — with no game to follow it". Davis enjoyed the experience's visuals and thought the movement gestures for the various abilities available to you were fun to do, but lamented the fact that these were constrained to specific, scripted moments in the experience. The story is constructed through a series of vignettes, which Davis noted had a similar pattern to their execution. He concluded that the experience "sits in a noncommittal, unsatisfying middle zone", and was hopeful any further updates or support for it from ILM Immersive would see the introduction of multiple branching paths within the story. An Immersive Story won Outstanding Innovation in Emerging Media Programming at the 76th Primetime Emmy Awards, and Best Use of VR/AR/XR at the 15th Advanced Imaging Society Lumiere Awards. It was nominated for the Innovation Award at the 36th Producers Guild of America Awards, while Patrick N.P. Conran, Shereif Fattouh, Zain Homer, and Jax Lee were nominated for Outstanding Visual Effects in a Real-Time Project at the 23rd Visual Effects Society Awards.

== Future ==
=== Marvel Zombies ===
In November 2021, a Marvel Zombies animated series was announced, focusing on "a new generation of heroes" battling zombies. Andrews returned to direct and serve as showrunner alongside Zeb Wells as head writer. It is a continuation of the reality first introduced in the fifth episode of What If...?, picking up five years from the end of that episode. Over 15 MCU actors reprise their MCU roles in the series, with several actors from What If...? also reprising their roles. It was released on Disney+ in September 2025, comprising four episodes. Three, two-episode television specials continuing the story of Marvel Zombies were announced in October 2026. Subtitled The Winter Soldier, The Fist of Khonshu, and The Last Guardian, they will be released around Halloween in 2027, 2028, and 2029, respectively. Andrews returns for the specials.

=== Potential projects ===
Winderbaum said there was potential for the variant characters in the series to appear in live-action, just as "what if" concepts from the Marvel Comics eventually made their way into the main comics continuity.

Andrews and Hayley Atwell both expressed interest in a live-action film starring the latter as Captain Carter, though Atwell wanted the right creative team that could "pave the way for [Carter] to tap into the cultural consciousness of today and become a modern heroine of our times". Atwell first reprised the role in live-action in Doctor Strange in the Multiverse of Madness as an alternate version of the character from Earth-838 (separate from the versions seen in What If...? and the main MCU) who is a member of the Illuminati.

A spin-off series centered on Star-Lord T'Challa had been in development but was left in "limbo" after Boseman's death, with Andrews admitting in September 2025 that Marvel Animation would have prioritized making the Star-Lord T'Challa series before Marvel Zombies had Boseman not died.
