= Thanos (Marvel Cinematic Universe) =

Character in the Marvel Cinematic Universe

- Marvel Cinematic Universe character
- Thanos as portrayed by Josh Brolin via motion capture in Avengers: Infinity War (2018)
- First appearance: The Avengers (2012)
- Last appearance: Avengers: Endgame (2019)
- Based on: Thanos by Jim Starlin
- Adapted by: Joss Whedon; Zak Penn; Christopher Markus Stephen McFeely (Note: Whedon and Penn co-wrote The Avengers (2012), where Thanos debuted in a minor role. Markus and McFeely were responsible for giving Thanos his first major MCU role with Avengers: Infinity War (2018).)
- Portrayed by: Josh Brolin
- Voiced by: Josh Brolin (What If...?)
- Motion capture: Damion Poitier (The Avengers)

In-universe information
- Alias: The Mad Titan
- Species: Titan
- Affiliation: Children of Thanos; Chitauri; Sakaarans; Outriders
- Weapon: Infinity Gauntlet; Double-sided sword
- Family: A'lars (father); Eros (brother)
- Children: Gamora (adoptive daughter); Nebula (adoptive daughter); Corvus Glaive (adoptive son); Cull Obsidian (adoptive son); Ebony Maw (adoptive son); Proxima Midnight (adoptive daughter)
- Home: Titan; Garden

Thanos is a fictional character portrayed primarily by Josh Brolin in the Marvel Cinematic Universe (MCU) media franchise, based on the Marvel Comics supervillain of the same name. He is depicted as an alien warlord from the doomed planet Titan with a universe-spanning agenda to wipe out half of all life to stabilize overpopulation and prevent what he views as life's inevitable extinction.

To do this, he sets out to obtain the six Infinity Stones, cosmic gems with the power to achieve his goal. With the help of his adopted children, Thanos fights against the Avengers, the Guardians of the Galaxy, and their allies, in the Infinity War, succeeds in assembling the Stones, and disintegrates half of all life in the universe in an event that is known as the Decimation. After escaping to the Garden and destroying the Stones, he is found and confronted by the surviving Avengers, and promptly killed by Thor once he reveals that his act is irreversible. Five years later, an alternate version of Thanos from 2014 time travels to 2023 to battle the Avengers once again, but is killed by Tony Stark.

Thanos is a key figure in the 23 films that make up the MCU's Infinity Saga, having appeared in five of its films, most notably as the main antagonist of both Avengers: Infinity War (2018) and Avengers: Endgame (2019). (Note: In Endgame, Thanos' 2014 self acts as the main antagonist after his 2018 self is killed towards the beginning of the film.) Several versions of Thanos from alternate realities in the MCU multiverse also appear in Endgame, the Disney+ animated television series What If...? (2021–2024) and Marvel Zombies (2025), and the Phase Four film Doctor Strange in the Multiverse of Madness (2022).

Thanos' appearance changed drastically over the course of his appearances as advances in CGI and motion capture technology allowed for better capture of Brolin's facial features. A new facial capture application called Masquerade was created for Infinity War and Endgame using machine learning. The character has been praised by critics and fans alike, with Brolin winning multiple awards for his performance. Thanos is often credited as one of the MCU's best villains, as well as one of the greatest film villains of all time. After his appearance in Infinity War, he became a key figure in popular culture and memes, making appearances in a variety of other media.

== Fictional character biography ==
Thanos' story in the MCU takes place in the Earth-616 universe. (Note: The main MCU universe was established to be Earth-616 in Doctor Strange in the Multiverse of Madness (2022).) The fictional biography below includes events that happened to Thanos from more than one Earth-616 timeline, as well as events that happened to him from multiple other universes.

=== Early life ===
Thanos was born approximately 1,000 years ago on the planet Titan to A'Lars, along with his brother Eros. Thanos deems the growth of Titan's population to be unsustainable, so he proposes to arbitrarily kill half of Titan's population. However, his people reject the idea and Thanos is subsequently ostracized. Over time, Thanos' prediction comes to pass, with him and Eros being the only surviving members.

=== Balancing the universe ===
Thanos, driven by his belief that the universe must be balanced by eliminating half of its population, embarks on conquests involving the killing of half of the planets' populations, becoming feared and powerful while taking control of various armies. He forges alliances with the Other and Ronan the Accuser, and adopts orphan children from worlds he invades, including Gamora and Nebula, considering the former to be his favorite. Eventually, he decides to obtain the Infinity Stones after realizing he could use them to wipe out half of all life in the universe. He obtains the Mind Stone and places it in a scepter.

In 2012, Thanos directs the Other to form an alliance with Loki. Thanos provides Loki with the scepter and a Chitauri army to obtain the Space Stone within the Tesseract by conquering Earth. Following Loki's defeat by the Avengers and the loss of the Mind Stone, the Other reports the failed attack to Thanos. In 2014, Thanos locates the Power Stone and sends Ronan, Gamora, and Nebula to retrieve it. However, they betray him: Gamora joins the Guardians of the Galaxy, Ronan obtains the Power Stone and resolves to kill Thanos after destroying Xandar, while Nebula allies with Ronan. The Guardians of the Galaxy defeat Ronan and leave the Power Stone with the Nova Corps. In 2015, Thanos arrives on Nidavellir and forces the native Dwarves to forge the Infinity Gauntlet to hold all six Stones, planning to collect them himself.

=== The Blip and death ===
In 2018, Thanos and his children decimate Xandar to retrieve the Power Stone. Shortly after, they intercept a ship carrying Asgardian refugees following their world's destruction. Thanos kills half of them and incapacitates Thor. Loki attempts to exchange the Tesseract to save Thor, but betrays Thanos and is killed. Thanos then defeats the Hulk after being attacked by him, and obtains the Space Stone from the Tesseract. He orders his children to retrieve the Mind Stone and Time Stone from Earth before convening on Titan.

Thanos travels to Knowhere and obtains the Reality Stone from Taneleer Tivan. The Guardians of the Galaxy arrive to stop him, but Thanos uses the Stone to defeat them and captures Gamora. Forcing her to reveal the location of the Soul Stone, they travel to Vormir, where the Soul Stone's keeper, Johann Schmidt, informs them that the Soul Stone requires the sacrifice of a loved one. Thanos then tearfully sacrifices Gamora to obtain the Stone.

Arriving on Titan expecting to meet with one of his children, Thanos encounters Stephen Strange and learns his child is dead. Ambushed by Tony Stark, Peter Parker, and members of the Guardians of the Galaxy, a fight ensues. Thanos is briefly incapacitated by their efforts as they attempt to remove the Infinity Gauntlet. However, once Peter Quill learns Thanos killed Gamora, he attacks Thanos in a fit of rage, causing him to break free and overpower them. He then prepares to kill Stark, until Strange offers the Time Stone in exchange for sparing Stark's life.

Thanos then teleports to Wakanda on Earth and encounters resistance from the Avengers - Bruce Banner, Steve Rogers, Sam Wilson, James Rhodes, Natasha Romanoff, Bucky Barnes, T'Challa, and Groot. After quickly defeating them, Thanos makes his way to Vision but Wanda Maximoff destroys the Mind Stone. However, Thanos uses the Time Stone to undo it and gains the Mind Stone, killing Vision. Placing it in his Gauntlet, Thanos is in possession of all six Stones. However, Thanos is impaled in the chest by Thor's axe, Stormbreaker. Despite his pain, Thanos manages to snap his fingers, successfully decimating half of all life in the universe.

With his mission complete, he teleports to the Garden, where he rests. Twenty-three days later, Thanos is ambushed by surviving members of the Avengers, Rocket Raccoon, Nebula, and Carol Danvers. They intend to use the Stones to reverse the snap, only to learn Thanos anticipated this and destroyed the Stones to prevent their further use. Enraged, Thor decapitates Thanos.

=== Battle at the Avengers Compound ===
In 2023, the surviving members of the Blip plan to use the Quantum Realm to time travel in order to retrieve the Stones. 2014-Thanos becomes aware of the Blip after the cybernetic implants of 2014-Nebula link to 2023-Nebula, revealing the latter's memories. Thanos has 2014-Nebula impersonate her future self and travel to 2023 so she can use the Quantum Realm to transport Thanos and his army there.

2014-Thanos arrives within his warship and destroys the Avengers Compound. While his army searches for the Stones, Thanos engages in a fight with Stark, Rogers, and Thor, during which he decides to destroy all life and repopulate it so that life would be grateful. Thanos defeats Stark and Thor, leaving only Rogers. He calls forth his armies, but the Avengers' restored allies arrive and engage Thanos and his army in a final battle. Thanos is nearly killed by Maximoff and orders his warship to rain down missiles to save him, which is then destroyed by Danvers. Thanos defeats Danvers, Rogers, Thor, and Stark, and obtains the Stark Nano Gauntlet, but Stark tricks Thanos by removing the stones and attaching them to his suit. Stark then snaps his fingers, turning Thanos and his entire army to dust, at the cost of his own life.

=== Legacy within Earth-616 ===
Thanos's actions have a universal impact, with the surviving Avengers working to mitigate the damage until they undo the Blip five years later in 2023. Maximoff is traumatized by Vision's death, causing her to have a mental breakdown and create a false reality.

Ajak, leader of the Eternals, informs Ikaris that the Blip delayed an apocalyptic event called the Emergence, saving many planets from destruction. However, when the Avengers reversed the Blip, the Emergence continued. Ajak feels the Earth should be saved and recruited the Eternals to stop the Emergence, doing so successfully.

The sudden return of the population has an impact as well, with the Global Repatriation Council (GRC) working to reintegrate the Blipped population. It led to socioeconomic conflicts, with entities like the Flag Smashers believing Thanos' ideas were correct. Feeling life was better during the Blip, they use terrorism against the GRC as they felt the GRC favored Blipped people more than the survivors. Moreover, the phrase "Thanos was right" is observed in popular human culture, being used in graffiti and merchandise for profit.

== Alternate versions ==
Multiple versions of Thanos are depicted in alternate realities of the MCU multiverse.

=== Joining the Ravagers ===
In an alternate reality, Star-Lord T'Challa convinces Thanos to join the Ravagers by persuading him there are other ways to preserve resources. In 2008, Thanos participates in their mission against the Collector, where he fights against his former allies, the Black Order. Thanos struggles in the fight, but Nebula helps him, and together they defeat his forces.

=== Zombie Outbreak ===
In an alternate 2018, Thanos arrives on Earth in Wakanda with a nearly complete Infinity Gauntlet, but is infected by a quantum virus and transforms into a zombie. Infected Thanos gradually starts learning to use the stones amidst the fight with Spider-Man, Scott Lang and T'Challa and acquires the last Infinity Stone, the Mind Stone, from them to complete his gauntlet. He is defeated by T'Challa, who also sacrifices himself by lunging at him and plunging them both into Wakanda's vibranium core, destroying the Infinity Stones and releasing a surge of energy.

=== Other universes ===
- In another alternate universe, Thanos arrives on Earth to retrieve the Mind Stone after collecting the other Infinity Stones, but is swiftly killed by Ultron.
- In a separate reality, Thanos is killed by Gamora who claims his warlord position, armor, and blade. Thanos had sent Gamora after Tony Stark following the Battle of New York, but Stark convinced Gamora to turn on her father and aided her in killing him. (Note: The episode showing these events was supposed to be featured during season 1, but the episode was postponed to season 2 due to issues caused by the COVID-19 pandemic.)
- On Earth-838, Thanos is killed on Titan by the Illuminati, who use the Book of Vishanti to impale him with his own double-sided sword.
- In another alternate universe, Thanos is killed with Gamora by Ronan the Accuser, and Nebula escapes from his shadow and joins the Nova Corps.
- In another alternate universe, as Thanos approaches a young Gamora, Hela arrives with the armies of Asgard and the Ten Rings to stop him.
- In an alternate 2018, Thanos went on his quest to obtain the Infinity Stones. When he arrived in Wakanda, he was confronted by Steve Rogers and engaged in a fight. However, Rogers hit his shield against the Time Stone, which transported him elsewhere.
- An alternate version of Thanos was imprisoned by Doctor Strange Supreme to be sacrificed to his Forge. Released by Captain Carter, Thanos attacked her and Kahhori only to be disintegrated by Infinity Killmonger with his own set of Infinity Stones.
- In an alternate timeline where Thor hosted a party on Earth and Howard the Duck and Darcy Lewis became married, Thanos was among the aliens hunting the couple's unhatched baby on Jotunheim (although he initially became involved with the pursuit believing it had to do with the Infinity Stones), until the egg turned gold and zapped the pursuers (including Thanos) with cosmic energy.
- In an alternate universe, Thanos possesses Wolverine's powers.

== Concept and creation ==
=== Background and development ===
Jim Starlin conceived Thanos during a college psychology course and introduced him as a villain in The Invincible Iron Man #55 (February 1973). Thanos was based on the Freudian concept of Thanatos, more commonly referred to as the death drive. Thanatos in Greek mythology was the personification of death and Thanos has been featured pursuing the female personification of Death. In the comics, Thanos is a mutant member of the race of superhumans known as the Titanian Eternals. The character possesses abilities common to the Eternals, and is able to demonstrate invulnerability and superhuman strength, speed, and stamina, among other qualities.

=== Casting and appearances ===
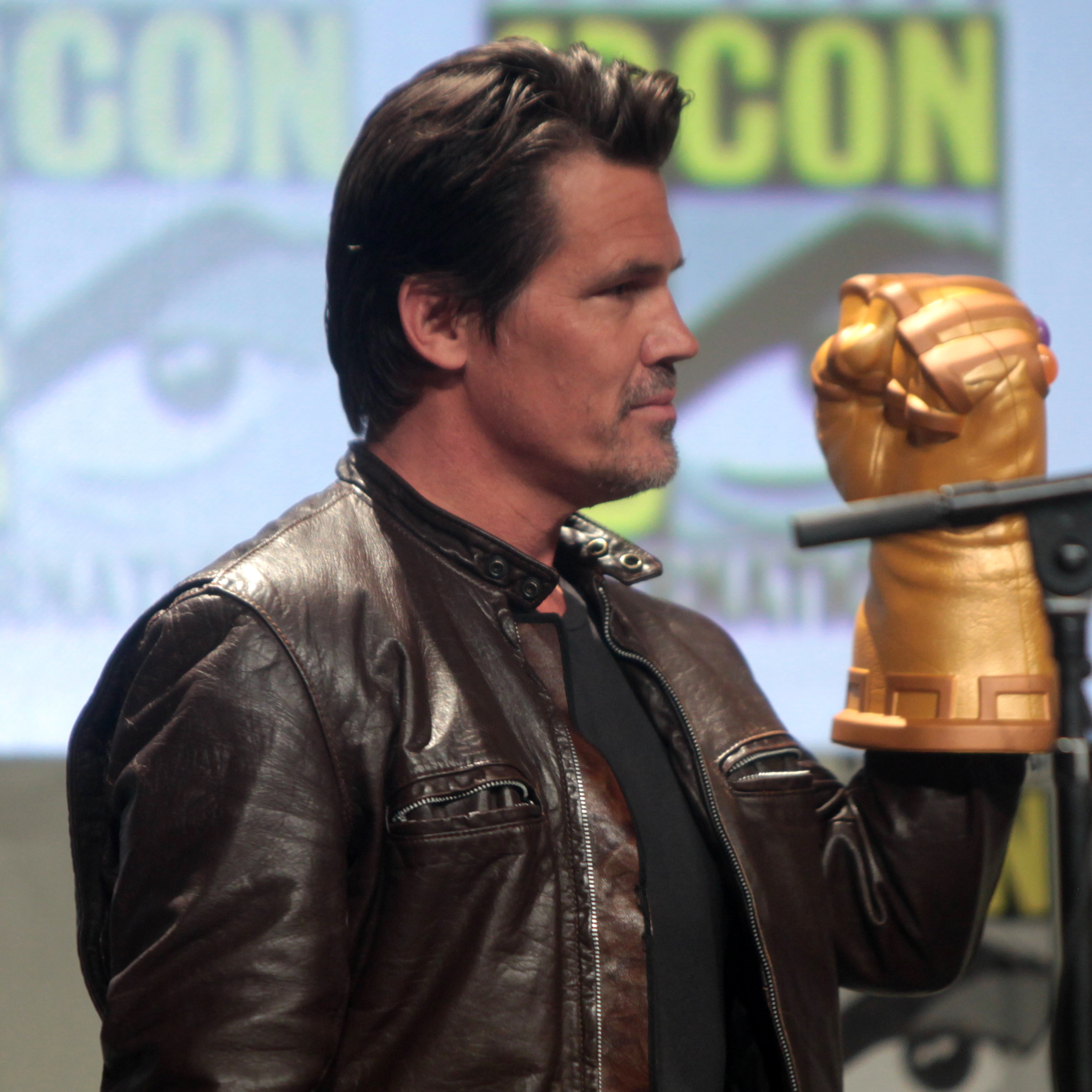
Josh Brolin wielding a model Infinity Gauntlet at the 2014 San Diego Comic-Con

Thanos made his MCU debut in The Avengers (2012), in which Damion Poitier portrayed the character and was only credited as Man #1. It was Joss Whedon's idea to include Thanos in the film as his only instructions from Kevin Feige were that the film's villains should be aliens, and the rest was up to Whedon. Ironically, Whedon found Thanos the hardest character to write due to being the least relatable, suggesting his cameo appearance as a "lark". Poitier was cast as Thanos due to his past collaborations with Whedon in the latter's shows Firefly, Angel and Dollhouse. Under the impression he would play Super-Skrull due to rumors that the film would include the Skrulls, Poitier was first informed of his true role while getting makeup applied and his face sculpted, as Marvel Studios was secretive about his part to avoid spoiler leaks. However, Feige said he and the filmmakers felt pretty free to recast the role, as Poitier was just cast for one shot, affirming that depending on the character's magnitude in further installments, they would decide who to cast.

In May 2014, Josh Brolin signed a multi-film contract to portray Thanos, debuting in Guardians of the Galaxy (2014). Whedon assisted director James Gunn in Brolin's casting. Thanos was originally going to have a larger role in the film, but Whedon felt that the character needed to be introduced to the franchise gradually; Nicole Perlman's script had Thanos as the film's villain, but as Whedon wanted Thanos to not have a big role in the plot, Gunn opted to minimize Thanos' part in the plot once he came on board to direct the film. Screenwriters Christopher Markus and Stephen McFeely stated that Thanos' previous appearances in the franchise helped legitimize him as a threat prior to Avengers: Infinity War (2018). Despite this, little screen time had been devoted to Thanos' history and motivations. Markus stated, "We don't get an element of surprise [with his introduction in Infinity War]... You can count on a lot of scenes where we illuminate a lot about him very early", with McFeely adding, "It is incumbent upon us to give him a real story, real stakes, real personality, and a real point of view".

Infinity War went through numerous story iterations, and over the course of development Thanos' presence in the film grew. VFX supervisor Dan DeLeeuw noted "Thanos went from supporting villain to one of the main characters driving the plot". In one draft, the film was told directly from Thanos' perspective with him serving as narrator, which went 250 pages and was discarded though it gave more insight into Thanos, while another draft had Thanos having already secured the Power Stone by the time the film starts, but the filmmakers felt he had too many Infinity Stones to begin with, so they opted to open the film in the middle of his plan with his attack on the Statesman. Exploring more of Thanos' backstory via flashbacks was considered at one point, but only concept art was created and no scenes were filmed involving a younger Thanos; one such scene had Thanos explaining his extremistic plans to his people as a younger man, but Markus and McFeely felt the scene reminded "a little too Jor-El on Krypton making his case", feeling that they could imply the sequence without actually showing it and deciding to just have one flashback, that being how Thanos met Gamora. Despite leading the cast in screen time in Infinity War and being considered the main character of the film by many, Thanos had a secondary role in Avengers: Endgame (2019). McFeely explained "we had to give ourselves permission to backseat the villain [...] You're rolling around in the loss and the time heist, and you think it's sort of Avengers against nature". Joe Russo stated that after Thanos was successful in Infinity War, he is "done" and "retired". Since at the end of Infinity War Thanos had acquired the enormously powerful Infinity Stones, Markus and McFeely had difficulty deciding how to include him in the plot of Endgame until executive producer Trinh Tran suggested that they kill Thanos in the film's first act. Markus explained that the character's early death improved his agenda. For 2014 Thanos' scenes with Nebula before time traveling to 2023, Joe Russo served as a stand-in for Brolin due to his unavailability those days, wearing his usual clothes and the headpiece depicting Thanos's head on cardboard to motion capture him.

Footage of Thanos killing Loki in Infinity War is shown in a scene of the first episode of the Disney+ television series Loki where Loki sees what his future would have looked like if he had not used the Tesseract to escape after the Battle of New York in 2012, creating a branched timeline that the Time Variance Authority has to prune.

=== Characterization ===
Thanos' storyline in The Infinity Gauntlet (1991), which was one of the comics that influenced Infinity War, features his attempt to woo the female manifestation of Death. This plot was omitted from the films, as the filmmakers instead chose to pair the character with Gamora and focus on their father-daughter relationship. McFeely explained this choice by noting that Thanos and Gamora had a lot of history that they wanted to explore, which would add layers to Thanos to avoid him becoming "the big mustache-twisting bad guy who wants ultimate power just to take over the world and sit on a throne." The Russos felt that the necessary time to introduce Death would be better spent on Thanos and the film's already large cast, with Anthony Russo expressing his conviction that adding a character whom the audience did not know about and having to explain her backstory with Thanos so the audience would care about her and find her interesting did not help to carry forward the story as it had been set out. Avoiding the Death storyline moved away from the tease Whedon used in The Avengers with the character, where Thanos felt that by challenging the Avengers, he was courting death. Though the tease was purposely ambiguous, Whedon felt when he featured Thanos, he did not know what to do with him, feeling that he hung Thanos out to dry. Whedon added that "I love Thanos. I love his apocalyptic vision, his love affair with death. I love his power. But, I don't really understand it". Whedon enjoyed the approach the writers and Russos took in Infinity War, giving Thanos "an actual perspective and [making] him feel righteous to himself", since the Death storyline would not necessarily translate well.

Even when not using the Infinity Stones, Thanos is shown to be a skilled physical fighter, defeating the Hulk in hand-to-hand combat in Infinity War and wielding a double-sided sword in combat in Endgame. Like the original comic book version of the character, Thanos in the MCU possesses superhuman strength, speed, and stamina.

=== Design and special effects ===
Test footage of Josh Brolin using Digital Domain's Masquerade facial capture software

Digital Domain worked on creating Thanos for Infinity War and Endgame, producing over 400 visual effects shots. The company created a new facial capture application called Masquerade, based on the concept of machine learning through computer algorithms, specifically for the film, beginning work on the system 3–4 months before filming began to develop and test it. They presented their results to Brolin, the Russos, and executives from Marvel ahead of filming to demonstrate the subtleties Brolin would be able to bring to the character, which helped inform Brolin on how to portray Thanos. Masquerade improved the quality of facial capture and sped up turn around, but was limited as it required Brolin to deliver his performance in a seated capture position. Before the start of filming, Brolin's facial expressions were captured with ILM's Medusa system, which along with his motion capture data, were fed to Masquerade to "create a higher-resolution version of what Brolin did on set" so animators could apply that to the CGI character. At 8 feet, 3 inches tall, Thanos was made taller for his MCU appearances than he was portrayed as being in the comics. Digital Design considered having "snap" briefly pop up on screen when Thanos snapped his fingers as a reference to how the snap occurred in the Infinity Gauntlet comic. Digital Domain's VFX Supervisor Kelly Port said "as a fun aside, we explored the idea of lifting the actual graphic from the frame of the comic showing the snap, the little yellow action triangles for a single frame of the moment of the snap. They appreciated the idea but didn't ultimately go for it".

==== Physical appearance changes ====
Thanos' previous physical appearances from (left-to-right) The Avengers (2012) and Guardians of the Galaxy (2014)

Thanos' design changed drastically between his first appearance in The Avengers and his larger role in Infinity War. With Brolin's first appearance in Guardians of the Galaxy, motion capture technology was used to capture Brolin's facial features, with Thanos' skin also being changed to a darker shade of purple than it had been in The Avengers. Advancements in CGI and motion capture technology allowed for the use of more of Brolin's features in Infinity War and Endgame. The shade of purple for Thanos' skin was changed again for the films, now becoming lighter. In earlier appearances, Thanos had four scars on his cheeks and eleven lines on his chin, but the number of scars was reduced to three and the number of chin lines was reduced to nine with his Infinity War design update. The design of Thanos took into account the versions that appeared in previous films but were adjusted more towards Brolin's features, which also helped with matching his performance to the digital character.

=== Portrayal ===
Brolin's portrayal of Thanos was inspired by Marlon Brando's performance as Colonel Kurtz in Apocalypse Now (1979). In an interview in October 2020, Brolin said "[Kurtz] is very elusive and insane but what he is saying makes sense and is poetical ... I started seeing the parallel which I liked for me. I loved being able to resort to a film like Apocalypse Now when I was doing something like Avengers".

== In other media ==
=== Film ===
In Deadpool 2 (2018), Deadpool mockingly calls Cable "Thanos" as both characters are played by Josh Brolin.

=== Television ===
- In the "couch gag" sequence of the season 30 episode of The Simpsons, "The Girl on the Bus" (2019), Thanos occupies the Simpson family's couch and uses the Infinity Gauntlet to wipe out all of the family except for Maggie Simpson.

Promotional image of Chinnos

- In the season 31 episode of The Simpsons, "Bart the Bad Guy" (2020), a parody of Thanos named Chinnos appears as an evil alien supervillain, voiced by Kevin Feige in a guest starring cameo role, which marked his voice acting debut. In the episode, Chinnos obtains the Doomsday app for his phone, threatening to restart the planet as a utopia in a parody of Thanos' actions in Endgame.

=== The Simpsons shorts ===
- Thanos' name appears on a guest list in The Simpsons Disney+ short Plusaversary (2021).
- Thanos makes a cameo appearance in The Simpsons Disney+ short The Most Wonderful Time of the Year (2024).

=== Video games ===
In 2018, the video game Fortnite featured a mode where players were able to play as Thanos for a limited period. In 2021, Thanos became a cosmetic outfit available for purchase.

== Reception ==
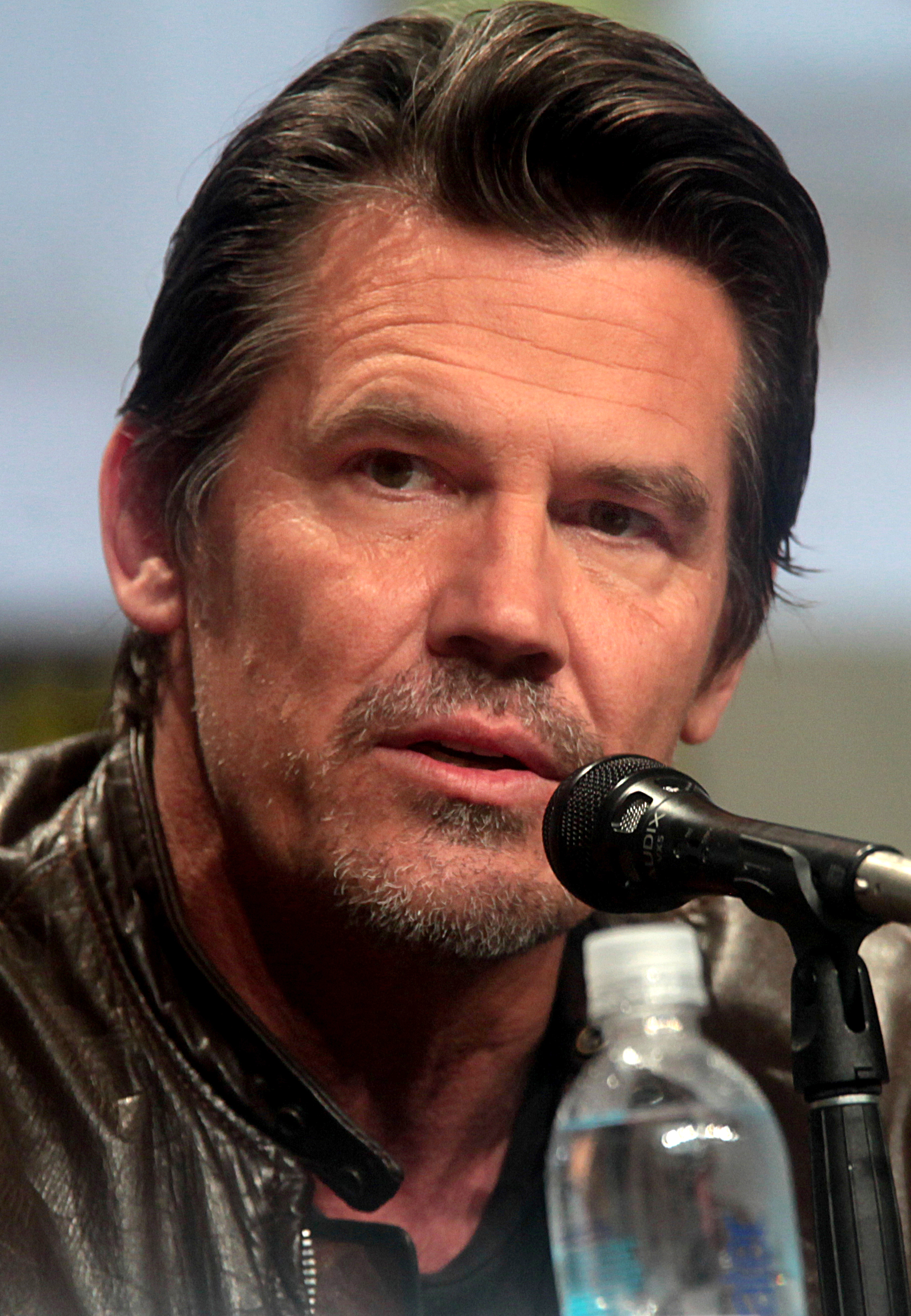
Josh Brolin's performance as Thanos has been praised by many critics.

The MCU's rendition of Thanos has received critical acclaim, being regarded as one of the best MCU villains to date, as well as one of the greatest film villains of all time. He has also been regarded as one of the best villains of the 2010s and the 21st century so far. Multiple critics praised Brolin's performance, both vocally and for the emotions he conveyed through the motion capture. The performance allowed the audience to empathize with Thanos even though he was the villain, while also allowing the audience to believe Thanos' pain. Peter Travers of Rolling Stone praised both the character and Brolin: "[Thanos is] thunderously voiced by a dynamite Josh Brolin in a motion capture performance that radiates ferocity and unexpected feeling". The Atlantic called Thanos an "unexpectedly resonant monster, filled with sadness and even a perverse sense of honor".

Critics called Thanos a significant improvement over previous antagonists in the franchise. According to Screen Rant, the MCU struggled to create captivating antagonists throughout its first two phases. However, this changed in Phase Three with well-received villains such as Killmonger and Vulture, culminating in Thanos, whose "repudiation of the MCU's narrative worship of its heroes creates a deep uncertainty in our expectation that follows through each encounter toward the inevitable, horrifying conclusion". George Marston attributed Thanos' success to "the weight behind his character" because the best villains are the ones who see themselves as the hero. As a result, Brolin's performance almost makes Thanos seem likable or reasonable, at least until "the utter horror" of him accomplishing his goal sets in. Similarly, The Washington Post declared Thanos Marvel's most compelling villain due to his "deep, reflective intelligence" as well as his "profound adherence to his belief system".

Some publications criticized Thanos' portrayal in Endgame, feeling that the 2014 variant of him was more openly villainous than the characterization established in Infinity War, and saying that he ended up "swapping his unusual plan of balancing the population with a less evocative idea of destroying then reforming the galaxy". Screen Rant felt that once Thanos learns of the Avengers' plot to reverse what his older self had done, he "regresses by falling back upon a one-dimensional aim to just destroy the universe wholesale", which made him seem more like a "generic big bad" in the film. The reviewer argued that Thanos' lack of history with the Avengers resulted in the nuances and connections being lost, notably when he is confronted by Maximoff after having killed her lover, Vision, but which in 2014 had not yet occurred in his life.

=== Cultural impact ===
Thanos and his "snap" spawned much audience enthusiasm. The website DidThanosKill.Me was created for fans to see if they would have been spared by Thanos or not by simply telling them either "You were spared by Thanos" or "You were slain by Thanos". The ending of Infinity War also spawned the creation of the Reddit subreddit, /r/thanosdidnothingwrong. A user within the subreddit suggested that half of the approximately 20,000 subscribers at the time be banned from the subreddit, in order to mimic the events of the film. After the community agreed to the measure, the moderators approached Reddit's administrators to see if the mass ban would be possible. Once the administrators agreed to the random ban of half the subscribers, it was set to occur on July 9, 2018. Notice of the impending ban made the subreddit's subscribers increase to over 700,000, including both of the Russo brothers. Ahead of the ban, Brolin posted a video saying "Here we go, Reddit users", and ending it with a snap. Over 60,000 people watched a live Twitch stream of the ban occurring, which lasted several hours. The ban of over 300,000 accounts, which included Anthony Russo, was the largest in Reddit's history. Those banned then gathered in the new subreddit, /r/inthesoulstone. One Reddit user who participated described the ban as embodying "the spirit of the Internet" with people "banding together, en masse, around something relatively meaningless but somehow decidedly awesome and hilarious". Andrew Tigani of Screen Rant said this showed "how impactful the film has already become to pop culture. It is also a testament to how valuable fan interaction can be via social media".

A popular tongue-in-cheek fan theory regarding Thanos' defeat in Endgame before the film's release claimed that Thanos would be killed by Ant-Man entering his anus and expanding himself within Thanos' body, jokingly referred to by the portmanteau "Thanus", going onto become a widespread Internet meme. After the film was released and proved the theory wrong, Christopher Markus revealed that due to the strong nature of the Titans, Ant-Man would have been unable to expand himself as he would be crushed by the walls of Thanos' rectum. In 2022, The Boys showrunner Eric Kripke confirmed that a character introduced in season three, Termite, was a parody of Ant-Man, and his actions of killing people by shrinking to enter their bodies and expanding was partially inspired by "Thanus".

Following the premiere of Endgame, Google included a clickable icon of the Infinity Gauntlet in Google Search results for "Thanos" or "Infinity Gauntlet" as an Easter egg. The icon, when clicked, made a finger-snapping motion before half of the search results disappeared, akin to the disappearance of characters following the Blip. The disappearance of the search results could also be reversed, shown by the use of the Time Stone in the Infinity Gauntlet icon.

During the 2020 United States presidential election campaign, a Twitter account affiliated with the 2020 Trump campaign posted an Internet meme of then-incumbent U.S. President Donald Trump superimposed on a clip of Thanos declaring himself "inevitable" in Endgame, with the meme reposted by Trump's own Instagram account. Thanos creator Jim Starlin subsequently criticized Trump, saying he "actually enjoys comparing himself to a mass murderer". In August 2020, Starlin revealed a new villain for an issue of Dreadstar Returns named King Plunddo Tram that heavily resembled Trump, with Plunddo Tram being an anagram of Donald Trump. In the issue, Tram is beheaded, with Starlin saying "a certain politician using a character of mine in one of his political ads may have riled me a bit. I figured he was open game at that point".

In March 2021, to congratulate James Cameron on Avatar (2009) regaining the title as the number one film of all-time at the worldwide box office over Endgame, the Russo brothers used an image with Thanos' armor scarecrow and the Avengers' logo dusting away into the Avatar logo.

In February 2023, during an interview in Time, Cameron gave statements admitting that he has a personal connection with Thanos. At one point in their conversation, Cameron shared that Thanos "had a pretty viable answer" to his problem, one that parallels the filmmaker's environmental activism: "I can relate to Thanos... I thought I had a pretty viable answer. The problem is that no one is going to raise their hand to volunteer to be the half that has to leave".

==== Scientific analysis and accuracy ====
After the release of Infinity War, scientific studies were published relating to the Snap, focusing on a variety of aspects including whether it would be possible for Thanos to even snap his fingers while wearing the Infinity Gauntlet. The 2021 study concluded that it would not be physically possible due to the lack of friction between the metal surface of the Gauntlet. A study published in 2020 focused on the ability to control matter as Thanos does while using the Infinity Stones. The researchers found that on a macroscopic level, someone would need a large amount of energy to control matter, similarly to the Stones. However, microscopically scientists can mimic Thanos' control of matter at the colloidal level. The researchers were able to make billions of colloidal particles with changeable responsiveness, patchiness, shapes, and sizes by manipulating them using triggers, including temperature, pH, and light.

=== Accolades ===
Accolades received by Thanos
Year	Work	Award	Category	Result	Ref.
2018	Avengers: Infinity War	MTV Movie & TV Awards	Best Villain	Nominated	
2018	Avengers: Infinity War	Teen Choice Awards	Choice Villain	Nominated	
2018	Avengers: Infinity War	Washington D.C. Area Film Critics Association Awards	Best Motion Capture Performance	Won	
2018	Avengers: Infinity War	Los Angeles Online Film Critics Society	Best Visual Effects or Animated Performance	Won	
2018	Avengers: Infinity War	Seattle Film Critics Society Awards	Best Villain	Nominated	
2019	Avengers: Infinity War	Austin Film Critics Association Awards	Best Motion Capture/Special Effects Performance	Won	
2019	Avengers: Infinity War	Visual Effects Society Awards	Outstanding Animated Character in a Photoreal Feature	Won	
2019	Avengers: Infinity War	Saturn Awards	Best Supporting Actor	Won	
2019	Avengers: Endgame	MTV Movie & TV Awards	Best Villain	Won	
2019	Avengers: Endgame	MTV Movie & TV Awards	Best Fight (Note: Shared with Chris Evans)	Nominated	
2019	Avengers: Endgame	Teen Choice Awards	Choice Villain	Won	
2019	Avengers: Endgame	Washington D.C. Area Film Critics Association Awards	Best Motion Capture Performance	Won	
2020	Avengers: Endgame	Austin Film Critics Association Awards	Best Motion Capture/Special Effects Performance	Won	
2020	Avengers: Endgame	Hollywood Critics Association Awards	Best Animated or VFX Performance	Nominated	

== Merchandise ==
Several toys have been released since Thanos' Guardians of the Galaxy appearance. For that film, Hot Toys released a figure of Thanos with his throne, while Funko released two variants of a Funko Pop, including one that glows in the dark. The number of Thanos toy and merchandise items increased leading up to the release of Infinity War in theaters. Hot Toys released a figure of Thanos and a 1:1 scale Infinity Gauntlet, while Funko released a variety of Pops, including multiple variations of regular-sized figures, as well as a 10-inch jumbo Pop. Pops after the film released included a set of six chrome Thanos figures each in the color of one of the Infinity Stones and movie moment Pops, which are Pops that feature characters in scenes from movies. These included Thanos vs. Captain America and Thor respectively. Funko has also included a variety of Thanos items in their Marvel Collector Corps subscription boxes, including the Infinity War box, which included a Pop of Thanos in Sanctuary II, a keycap, and an Infinity Gauntlet mug. Lego released a BrickHeadz and a traditional set featuring Iron Man, Star-Lord, and Gamora minifigures alongside a Thanos bigfigure, while Hasbro released a five pack of Marvel Legends with Thanos and his children. Hot Toys released two figures of Thanos after Endgame debuted in theaters; a regular version which came with the Infinity Gauntlet and a battle damaged version that came with the Nano Gauntlet. As with the initial wave of figures for Infinity War, Funko released both a regular sized and a 10 inch tall Thanos before Endgame was in theaters, while Pops after the film released included Thanos in his Garden attire. After the season one finale of What If...?, Funko announced a Ravager Thanos Pop.

A variety of Thanos-related toys were released for both Marvel Studios' tenth anniversary and the Infinity Saga. For the anniversary, Funko released an updated version of Thanos from Guardians of the Galaxy, this time with him sitting on his throne. To celebrate the Infinity Saga, Funko released a Thanos Pop using the colors of the Infinity Stones, while Lego released multiple sets, including two sets for Endgame's final battle. One included Sanctuary II and the other was set at the Avengers' Compound. Lego also released an Infinity Gauntlet with articulating fingers, allowing for builders to put it in a snapping pose, while Hasbro released a Marvel Legends two-pack featuring a battle damaged Iron Man in his mark LXXXV armor and a battle damaged Thanos.

Entertainment Weekly released an issue of their magazine for Infinity War featuring Thanos on the cover and a cover story interview with Brolin. Empire had two covers for each of Infinity War and Endgame featuring Thanos; one available to the general public and one that was exclusive to subscribers. Many posters were available for purchase including the theatrical posters for Infinity War and Endgame which both featured Thanos. Other posters included one exclusive to Odeon Cinemas and one featuring the children of Thanos. Limited edition posters were released for Marvel Studios' tenth anniversary, as well as to celebrate the Infinity Saga with posters for the four Avengers films. Two posters were released for the tenth anniversary, one including the heroes and one for Thanos and the other villains. For the Avengers posters, Thanos was prominently included on the Infinity War and Endgame versions.

== See also ==
- Characters of the Marvel Cinematic Universe
