= Mantis (Marvel Cinematic Universe) =

Character in the Marvel Cinematic Universe

- Marvel Cinematic Universe character
- Pom Klementieff as Mantis in Guardians of the Galaxy Vol. 2 (2017)
- First appearance: Guardians of the Galaxy Vol. 2 (2017)
- Last appearance: Guardians of the Galaxy Vol. 3 (2023)
- Based on: Mantis by: Steve Englehart; Don Heck
- Adapted by: James Gunn
- Portrayed by: Pom Klementieff

In-universe information
- Full name: Mantis
- Nickname: Mant
- Species: Insectoid–Celestial hybrid
- Occupation: Servant; Mercenary
- Affiliation: Guardians of the Galaxy
- Fighting style: Martial arts with superhuman physiology and psychic abilities
- Weapon: Various alien firearms
- Family: Ego (father); Peter Quill (half-brother)
- Home: Knowhere

Mantis is a fictional character portrayed by Pom Klementieff in the Marvel Cinematic Universe (MCU) film franchise, based on the Marvel Comics character of the same name. She is a member of the Guardians of the Galaxy with empathic powers and is the paternal half-sister of its leader, Peter Quill. Introduced in Guardians of the Galaxy Vol. 2 (2017), she is an alien ward of Ego with the power to control the emotions of people by touch. She is commonly depicted as having a naive, innocent and somewhat explosive personality as the movies go on.

As of 2024, the character has appeared in five films: Guardians of the Galaxy Vol. 2, Avengers: Infinity War, Avengers: Endgame, Thor: Love and Thunder, and Guardians of the Galaxy Vol. 3 as well as The Guardians of the Galaxy Holiday Special, in which she serves as the lead character.

== Fictional character biography ==
=== Joining the Guardians ===
Mantis is raised by the living planet Ego (later revealed to also be her father) due to her ability to use her powers to help him rest. In 2014, Mantis and Ego's human-form projection later encounter the Guardians of the Galaxy—Peter Quill, Gamora, Drax, Rocket, Groot, and Nebula—after the Guardians traveled to a nearby planet to escape the Sovereign, from whom Rocket had stolen Anulax batteries during a battle. Ego's projection reveals that Ego is Quill's father, and they travel to the planet, Ego. Along the way, Mantis demonstrates her ability to detect people's emotions and feelings by touch. When Quill, Gamora, and Drax reach Ego, Mantis struggles with whether to tell Drax about Ego's evil plans, and ultimately joins the Guardians in their fight against Ego. She and the Guardians are saved by Kraglin, who arrives with a ship to allow them to escape.

=== Infinity War and resurrection ===
In 2018, Mantis and the Guardians, onboard the Benatar, respond to a distress call and rescue Thor adrift in space. After the team splits up, she accompanies Quill, Gamora, and Drax to Knowhere to stop Thanos, but is neutralized by Thanos using the Reality Stone. Mantis then goes to Titan with Quill and Drax, where they team up with Tony Stark, Peter Parker, and Stephen Strange in another attempt to wrest the Infinity Gauntlet from Thanos. Although Mantis is able to temporarily put Thanos to sleep, he breaks free of her control when Quill learns from Nebula that Gamora died and strikes him. Mantis falls unconscious after Thanos throws a moon at Titan, but is rescued by Parker. Shortly after, Mantis becomes the first on Titan to fall victim to the Blip.

In 2023, Mantis is restored to life and is brought via Strange's portal to the ruins of the Avengers Compound in New York on Earth. She participates in the battle against an alternate Thanos. Later, Mantis and her reunited teammates attend Stark's funeral. They then pick Thor up from Norway and return to space in the Benatar.

=== New adventures ===
In 2024, Mantis and the Guardians, joined by Kraglin, embark on space adventures. In 2025, they go to the planet Indigarr and are joined by Thor's friend, Korg. As the planet is under attack by the Booskans, she and Quill seek out Thor's help, who defeats the army quickly and is gifted two Indigarrian goats, who annoy her. After learning of several killings of gods by a god butcher, they split up from Thor to help out.

Few months later, Mantis and the Guardians return to Knowhere where they buy it from the Collector and gain a new member to the team, Cosmo. Mantis helps in refurbishing Knowhere following the attack it endured. Knowing how depressed Quill is due to losing his love, Mantis wants to give him a meaningful Christmas and makes plans with Drax to bring Kevin Bacon as a gift for Quill. Mantis pilots their new ship, the Bowie, back to Earth and she and Drax land in Hollywood, Los Angeles, California. They inadvertently make money as buskers posing for pictures on the Hollywood Walk of Fame awhile seeing various Avengers cosplayers. They also get drunk at a nightclub bar. A seller of star maps offers to tell them where to find Bacon's house, and Mantis uses her powers to take the map without paying and to take all the seller's money. They go to Bacon's house in Beverly Hills and capture him and steal Christmas decorations from a holiday store. Back on Knowhere, they hold a Christmas celebration and present Bacon to Quill. Later, Mantis reveals to Quill that Ego was also her father, making them half-siblings, which Quill says is the greatest Christmas gift ever.

=== Final mission ===
In 2026, Mantis, along with the Guardians, witness Quill getting drunk and passing out. One night after this happens, an attack occurs by Adam, and Mantis gets her arm broken, but heals it with a medpack. However, Rocket is seriously injured, leaving the Guardians unable to tend to his wounds due to a kill switch embedded in him. Mantis accompanies the team to help Rocket in the Bowie and travels to the Orgoscope, headquarters of the High Evolutionary's company Orgocorp, in the hopes of finding an override code. Before they arrive, the Ravagers board their ship, along with alternate Gamora, who joins them to Orgoscope. Their next move takes them to Counter-Earth. After Quill, Nebula, and Groot leave to the High Evolutionary's ship, Mantis and Drax follow, meeting Nebula as the planet begins to explode. They hop onto the ship, where they discover hordes of imprisoned children in cages. The High Evolutionary arrives and knocks them out, throwing them in a chamber with Abilisks. Mantis is able to persuade the Abilisks to side with them, and the three escape the chamber before reuniting with the team and overpowering the High Evolutionary's army. Mantis assists in freeing the captive animals onboard and helping them get across Cosmo's telekinetic tunnel onto Knowhere. Once everyone is on Knowhere, the Guardians have a meeting and as others disband, Mantis decides to go on a journey of self-discovery with the Abilisks, saying goodbye to the team.

== Alternate versions ==
In an alternative 2011, Mantis was among the numerous alien attendees of Thor's parties on Earth, until she and the attendees panicked when they were informed that Frigga was coming, and worked to clean up the mess on Earth.

== Creation and characterization ==
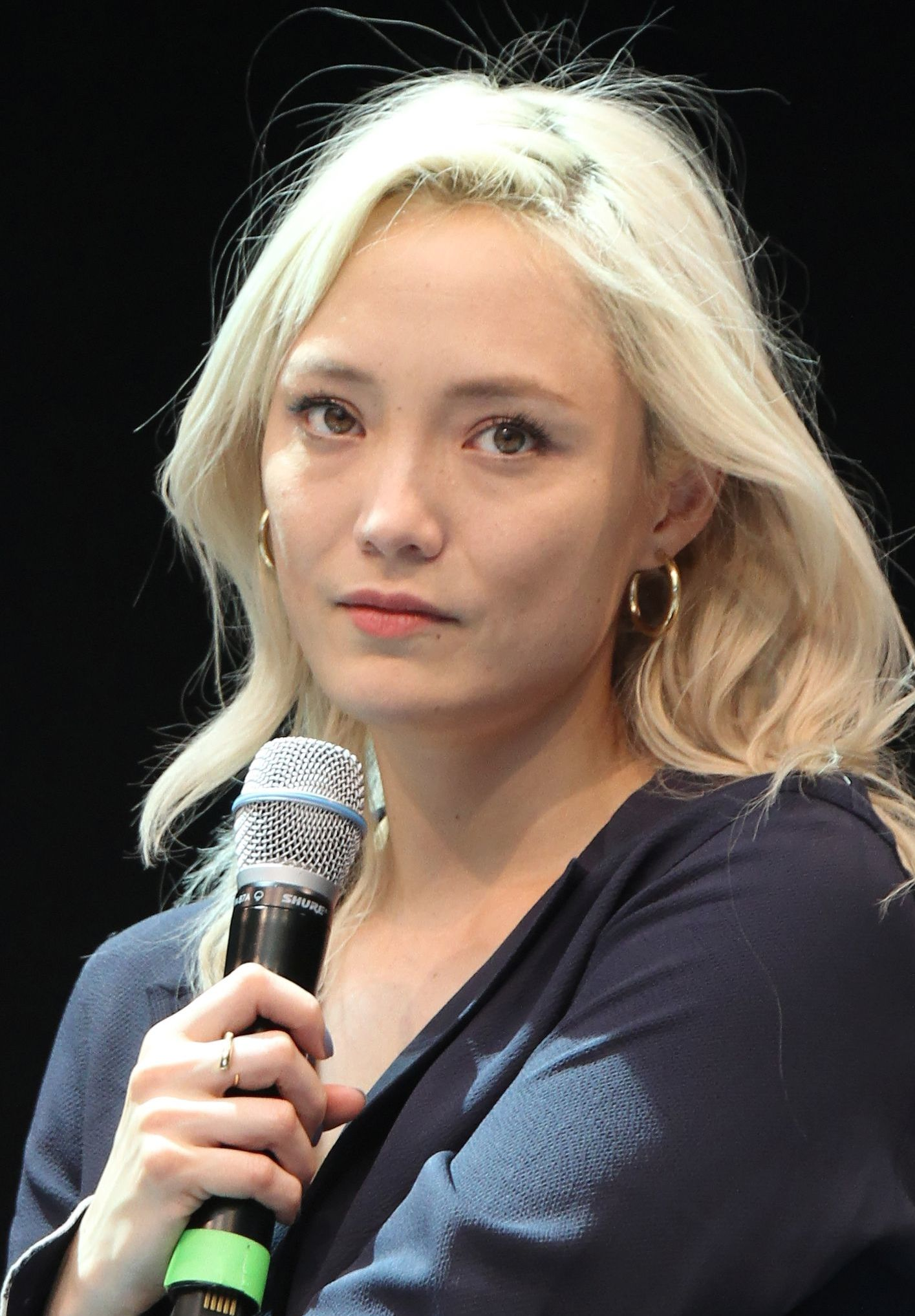
Klementieff in 2019

In May 2014, director James Gunn said that he had planned to introduce two major new characters in the Guardians of the Galaxy sequel, Mantis and Adam Warlock. Talks had begun with an actor Gunn had in mind to portray Mantis, while he had decided to remove Warlock due to the film "getting too busy". Gunn added that Warlock was "one character too many and I didn't want to lose Mantis and Mantis was more organically part of the movie anyway." Klementieff was cast in October 2015.

In Guardians of the Galaxy Vol. 2, Mantis is portrayed as a new member of the Guardians with empathic powers who lives with Ego. Executive producer Jonathan Schwartz said the character "has never really experienced social interaction", and learns about "social intricacies" from the other Guardians. Klementieff added, "She was really lonely and by herself, so it's a completely new thing to meet these people and to discover new things", comparing this to a child making awkward mistakes in social situations. Mantis and Drax have an "interesting" relationship in the film due to both being "complete odd balls". Steve Englehart, Mantis' co-creator, was disappointed with the character's portrayal, saying, "That character has nothing to do with Mantis ... I really don't know why you would take a character who is as distinctive as Mantis is and do a completely different character and still call her Mantis."

Dave Bautista indicated that at one point Gunn wanted to do "a Drax and Mantis film" as a spinoff, but that the concept was not pursued by Marvel. In September 2021, Gunn noted that for both Klementieff's Mantis and Karen Gillan's Nebula "their roles are both pretty huge" in the script for Guardians of the Galaxy Vol. 3. Mantis and Drax also play a major role in The Guardians of the Galaxy Holiday Special, of which Klementieff said, "I get to be the weirdest I've ever been as Mantis". Mantis also had a fight scene in the special, which revealed that she had superhuman strength and fighting abilities not previously portrayed in the MCU.

== Powers and abilities ==
Mantis has the power to sense the feelings and emotions of others whom she touches, and to influence their thoughts, memories or cause them to fall asleep, essentially mind controlling them. In Guardians of the Galaxy Vol. 2 she was introduced as being powerful enough to put the celestial Ego to sleep. In Avengers: Infinity War, she was able to lull Thanos into a stupor, although she struggled to maintain this state. In The Guardians of the Galaxy Holiday Special, she was able to instantly cause Kevin Bacon to cease resisting and voluntarily accompany herself and Drax to Knowhere, keeping him in that state for an extended period of time.

Mantis is also shown to have superhuman physical abilities, such as superhuman strength, durability, and agility. She has withstood severe damage, such as being smashed in the head by a piece of flaming spaceship debris, survived immense falls effortlessly, and received a headbutt from Thanos. Her physical skills were later expanded upon in the Holiday Special, as she leaps multiple feet into the air while she fights and defeats multiple police officers at once, armed with only a giant holiday candy cane decoration, using a combination of martial arts and her ability to put people to sleep.

== In other media ==
=== Theme parks ===
Klementieff reprises her role as Mantis for the attraction Guardians of the Galaxy – Mission: Breakout! at Disney California Adventure.

== See also ==
- Characters of the Marvel Cinematic Universe
