= The Guardians of the Galaxy Holiday Special =

Marvel Studios television special

- Official release poster
- Genre: Action-adventure; Christmas; Science fiction comedy; Superhero
- Based on: Marvel Comics
- Written by: James Gunn
- Directed by: James Gunn
- Starring: Chris Pratt; Dave Bautista; Karen Gillan; Pom Klementieff; Vin Diesel; Bradley Cooper; Sean Gunn; Old 97's; Michael Rooker; Kevin Bacon
- Composer: John Murphy
- Country of origin: United States
- Original language: English

Production
- Executive producers: Sara Smith; Simon Hatt; James Gunn; Brad Winderbaum; Victoria Alonso; Louis D'Esposito; Kevin Feige
- Producer: Nikolas Korda
- Production locations: Atlanta, Georgia; Los Angeles, California
- Cinematography: Henry Braham
- Editors: Greg D'Auria; Gregg Featherman
- Running time: 42 minutes
- Production company: Marvel Studios

Original release
- Network: Disney+
- Release: November 25, 2022

Related
- Marvel's Special Presentations

The Guardians of the Galaxy Holiday Special is an American television special written and directed by James Gunn for the streaming service Disney+, based on Marvel Comics featuring the superhero team Guardians of the Galaxy. It is the second Special Presentation in the Marvel Cinematic Universe (MCU), sharing continuity with the films and television series of the franchise. The special was produced by Marvel Studios, and follows the Guardians of the Galaxy as they celebrate Christmas and search for a present for their leader, Peter Quill.

Chris Pratt, Dave Bautista, Karen Gillan, Pom Klementieff, Vin Diesel, Bradley Cooper, Sean Gunn, and Michael Rooker reprise their roles as the Guardians from previous MCU media, with the special also featuring the band Old 97's and Kevin Bacon as a fictionalized version of himself. Gunn had worked on the concept for the special during the production of Guardians of the Galaxy Vol. 2 (2017) before it was announced in December 2020. Filming occurred from February to late April 2022 in Atlanta, Georgia, and Los Angeles, during the production of Guardians of the Galaxy Vol. 3 (2023).

The Guardians of the Galaxy Holiday Special was released on Disney+ on November 25, 2022, serving as the conclusion of Phase Four of the MCU. The special received positive reviews from critics for its humor, Gunn's direction, and the cast's performances. It received multiple awards nominations, including wins at the Children's and Family Emmy Awards.

== Plot ==
The Guardians of the Galaxy have purchased Knowhere from the Collector and taken in Cosmo the Spacedog as a new member. As Christmas approaches, Kraglin tells the Guardians a childhood story of how Yondu ruined Christmas for Peter Quill. Mantis discusses with Drax her plan to find a perfect Christmas present for Quill, who is still depressed following the loss of Gamora. (Note: As depicted in Avengers: Infinity War (2018) and Avengers: Endgame (2019)) After brainstorming, they decide to go to Earth and retrieve Quill's childhood hero, Kevin Bacon.

Mantis and Drax arrive in Hollywood, Los Angeles, and search for Bacon. After spending time at Grauman's Chinese Theater, the Hollywood Walk of Fame, and a bar, they get a map of celebrities' residences and find Bacon's home in Beverly Hills. Bacon, who is waiting for his family to come home, is terrified by the appearance of Mantis and Drax and tries to escape. Police arrive to help, but Mantis places them and Bacon in a trance before taking Bacon with them. As they return to Knowhere, Mantis and Drax are disappointed to learn that Bacon is an actor and not a real-life hero.

Later, the Guardians surprise Quill with a Christmas celebration, but Quill is horrified to learn that Bacon had been kidnapped, demanding that he be returned home. On the Guardians' new spaceship, the Bowie, Bacon learns from Kraglin how he inspired Quill's heroism and decides to celebrate Christmas with the Guardians before returning home.

After the celebration, Quill reveals to Mantis that Yondu eventually changed his mind about Christmas and gifted him a pair of blasters which now serve as his primary weapons. Mantis confides in him that she is Quill's half-sister, after years of refusing to tell him the truth out of fear of reminding him of his father Ego's misdeeds, (Note: As depicted in Guardians of the Galaxy Vol. 2 (2017)) to Quill's surprise and elation.

== Cast ==
- Chris Pratt as Peter Quill / Star-Lord:
  The half-human, half-Celestial leader of the Guardians of the Galaxy who was abducted from Earth as a child and raised by a group of alien thieves and smugglers called the Ravagers. Luke Klein portrays a young Quill during the animated flashback scenes, after the role was previously portrayed by Wyatt Oleff in Guardians of the Galaxy (2014) and Guardians of the Galaxy Vol. 2 (2017).
- Dave Bautista as Drax the Destroyer: A member of the Guardians and a highly skilled warrior whose family was slaughtered by Ronan.
- Karen Gillan as Nebula:
  A member of the Guardians and former Avenger who is an orphan from an alien world, and was trained by Thanos to be his personal assassin. She takes on more of a leadership role within the Guardians.
- Pom Klementieff as Mantis: A member of the Guardians with empathic powers and Quill's half-sister.
- Vin Diesel as Groot: A member of the Guardians who is a tree-like humanoid and the accomplice of Rocket.
- Bradley Cooper as Rocket:
  A member of the Guardians and former Avenger who is a genetically-engineered raccoon-based bounty hunter and a master of weapons and military tactics.
- Sean Gunn as Kraglin Obfonteri:
  A member of the Guardians and Yondu Udonta's former second-in-command in the Ravagers. He has become more integrated within the Guardians and "part of that family", being "a major part of [their] support system".
- The Old 97's as Bzermikitokolok and the Knowheremen:
  An alien band on Knowhere. Lead singer Rhett Miller portrays Bzermikitokolok, while Miller's bandmates Murry Hammond, Ken Bethea, and Philip Peeples portray band members Kortolbookalia, Sliyavastojoo, and Phloko, respectively. It took the band approximately three-and-a-half hours to have their prosthetic makeup applied.
- Michael Rooker as Yondu Udonta:
  A blue-skinned buccaneer of the Ravagers and former member of the Guardians, who was a fatherly figure to Quill and died in Vol. 2. Rooker portrays Yondu during the animated flashback scenes.
- Kevin Bacon as himself, an actor and Quill's childhood hero who is kidnapped by Mantis and Drax.

Maria Bakalova provides the voice and additional motion capture for Cosmo the Spacedog, a member of the Guardians who is a sapient dog that developed psionic abilities after being sent into space by the Soviet Union; Cosmo is physically portrayed by dog actor Slate, replacing Fred, who played Cosmo in the first two Guardians films. Stephen Blackehart appears as Steemie, a denizen of Knowhere. Bacon's wife Kyra Sedgwick has a voice-only role as herself. Flula Borg appears as a bartender at the bar that Mantis and Drax visit in Hollywood.

== Production ==
=== Development ===
In December 2020, Marvel Studios President Kevin Feige announced The Guardians of the Galaxy Holiday Special, a television special featuring the Guardians of the Galaxy to be written and directed by James Gunn, the writer and director of the Guardians of the Galaxy films. The Holiday Special was the first piece of content Marvel Studios planned to create for Disney+ and was originally conceived by Gunn during the production of Guardians of the Galaxy Vol. 2 (2017); at that time, it was being developed for ABC following Vol. 2's release. Gunn stated that the special would be live-action and canon to the Marvel Cinematic Universe (MCU), and noted that he had been a fan of the Star Wars Holiday Special (1978) and animated Christmas specials such as Rudolph the Red-Nosed Reindeer (1964) and How the Grinch Stole Christmas! (1966) as a child.

The Guardians of the Galaxy Holiday Special is 44 minutes long, and is the second Special Presentation in the MCU, marketed as a "Marvel Studios Special Presentation". Marvel Studios' Feige, Louis D'Esposito, Victoria Alonso, and Brad Winderbaum, Sara Smith, and Simon Hatt serve as executive producers, alongside Gunn.

=== Writing ===
Gunn called the Holiday Special "one of my favorite stories ever", with a story "as crazy and fun as can be" that he had "bugged [Feige] endlessly about over the years". Gunn finished the script in April 2021, after initially writing the treatment "years ago". It took Gunn a few hours to write the script, and he noted featuring Kevin Bacon was a quick inclusion once he had figured out the story for the special.

The main cast members of the Guardians films are featured, focusing on Drax the Destroyer and Mantis. Gunn decided to focus on the Drax and Mantis relationship in the special because he felt those characters had been "sidelined" in their appearances outside of the Guardians of the Galaxy films between Vol. 2 and Guardians of the Galaxy Vol. 3 (2023). He described the two of them as "kind of like Abbott and Costello, but both are Costellos", adding, "They do not have any of the values that human beings normally have, so they don't have the same boundaries that we have. They're like following an unattended fire hose around." Mantis actress Pom Klementieff called the Holiday Special "very goofy and very funny and cute" while "also very rooted in something much, much deeper and more beautiful and heartfelt".

The Guardians of the Galaxy Holiday Special is set between Thor: Love and Thunder (2022) and Guardians of the Galaxy Vol. 3. Gunn noted there were parts of the special that would help set up material in Vol. 3, calling the Holiday Special a "Trojan Horse" that allowed him to introduce important elements to Vol. 3 that he then would not need to explain at the beginning of that film. Some of this material includes filling in the Guardians recent history, such as how they now operate out of Knowhere, have a new ship called the Bowie, Cosmo the Spacedog is now a member of the Guardians, and "a couple of bigger pieces of spoiler-y lore". The special has been described by Gunn as the epilogue of Phase Four of the MCU.

=== Casting ===
The Guardians of the Galaxy Holiday Special sees Chris Pratt, Dave Bautista, Vin Diesel, Bradley Cooper, Karen Gillan, Pom Klementieff, and Sean Gunn all reprising their MCU roles as Guardians of the Galaxy members Peter Quill / Star-Lord, Drax the Destroyer, Groot, Rocket, Nebula, Mantis, and Kraglin Obfonteri, respectively, along with Michael Rooker as Yondu Udonta. Kevin Bacon was revealed to be starring in the special as a fictionalized version of himself in October 2022, along with Maria Bakalova voicing Cosmo the Spacedog ahead of her role in Vol. 3. Bakalova also provides additional motion capture for Cosmo, who is physically portrayed by dog actor Slate, replacing dog actor Fred from Guardians of the Galaxy (2014) and Vol. 2. The band the Old 97's also appear in the special as the alien band Bzermikitokolok and the Knowheremen, while Bacon's wife Kyra Sedgwick has a voice cameo appearance.

=== Filming and animation ===
Filming for the special had begun by February 2022, at Trilith Studios in Atlanta, Georgia, under the working title Pop Tart. It occurred during the later portion of production of Guardians of the Galaxy Vol. 3, which lasted from November 2021 until May 2022, and used the same sets as that film. Henry Braham served as cinematographer, after doing so for Guardians of the Galaxy Vol. 2 and Vol. 3. Gunn enjoyed being able to switch to filming the special after doing scenes for Vol. 3, given the tonal difference between the two with Vol. 3 being more "emotional", and called the Holiday Special shoot easier than Vol. 3.

The special was originally supposed to be shot during Vol. 3's initial production time in 2019, before several production delays. A day of filming in Los Angeles for the special had been expected by early January 2022, but did not occur due to the COVID-19 Omicron variant. The Old 97's filmed their roles in March 2022. Filming occurred around the Atlanta Country Club in late March, with various Christmas-themed decorations being used, and at the TCL Chinese Theatre in Hollywood on April 28, with Bautista and Klementieff. The set featured various Christmas-themed decorations and posters of Kumail Nanjiani's character Kingo from the MCU film Eternals (2021). Filming of the special wrapped by the end of April.

Rooker and Luke Klein filmed the material for the flashback sequences, which was animated by Stoopid Buddy Stoodios through rotoscoping in the style of Ralph Bakshi to emulate the Christmas specials from Rankin/Bass Animated Entertainment. Marvel had received bids from other animations studios for the sequences, but their test sequences had used more traditional animation techniques, compared to Stoopid Buddy's rotoscoping approach, which set them apart and fulfilled the look Gunn and Marvel were looking for. Animation director Mac Whiting was able to find archival recordings of how the Bakshi-style animations were made to reference and ensure the process for the Holiday Special was authentic as possible. Whiting and his team were able to be on set when Rooker and Klein were filmed to discuss with Gunn things such as how the camera would be set up, to ensure it was "simple enough for animation, but also dynamic enough so it had that big cinematic feel". Stoopid Buddy added Yondu's fin and adjusted Klein's features to more resemble young Quill during animation. It took 10 to 12 people about four months to complete the animation, with Stoopid Buddy working with Studio Moshi to provide additional animations.

=== Post-production ===
Greg D'Auria serves as the editor for the special, while Stephane Ceretti serves as the visual effects supervisor. Visual effects for the special were created by Framestore, Rodeo FX, Crafty Apes, Sony Pictures Imageworks, Industrial Light & Magic, Wētā FX, Gradient / Secret Lab, and Perception.

=== Music ===
John Murphy, the composer of Vol. 3, was confirmed to score the Holiday Special in January 2022. The special's soundtrack, consisting of Murphy's score and two original songs, was released digitally by Hollywood Records and Marvel Music on November 23, 2022.

Gunn chose the music for the Holiday Special "very early". He wrote the lyrics to the opening song, "I Don't Know What Christmas Is (But Christmastime Is Here)", and approached Rhett Miller from the group the Old 97's to help him compose it. "Here It Is Christmastime", an existing song of the Old 97's, was also used and re-recorded with Bacon for the end of the special. In addition to "I Don't Know What Christmas Is (But Christmastime Is Here)" and "Here It Is Christmastime", other songs featured in the special include: "Fairytale of New York" by the Pogues featuring Kirsty MacColl, "Dead by X-Mas" by Hanoi Rocks, "Christmas Treat" by Julian Casablancas, "Is This Christmas?" by the Wombats, "Just Like Christmas" by Low, "I Want an Alien for Christmas" by Fountains of Wayne, "Christmastime" by the Smashing Pumpkins, "Christmas Wrapping" by the Waitresses, and "Mrs. Claus" by Little Jackie.

== Marketing ==
In August 2022, a Lego advent calendar set for The Guardians of the Galaxy Holiday Special was revealed, which was released on September 1. The official trailer for the special was released on October 25, 2022. Amanda Lamadrid at Screen Rant felt the trailer offered "a wild and heartwarming romp" and "more insight as to the wild storyline". Lamadrid noted how it depicted "one of the series' classic jokes in charming fashion", particularly Peter Quill referring to Kevin Bacon as "the greatest hero on Earth" in Guardians of the Galaxy (2014). By November 2022, smart home company Vivint released a commercial promoting the special and their products. Two episodes of the series Marvel Studios: Legends were released on November 23, 2022 on Disney+, exploring Mantis and Drax using footage from their previous MCU appearances; the episodes were removed shortly after as they revealed plot details relevant to the special.

== Release ==
The Guardians of the Galaxy Holiday Special was released on Disney+ on November 25, 2022. A special screening occurred on November 18, 2022, at NeueHouse in Hollywood. It is the conclusion of Phase Four of the MCU.

== Reception ==
=== Viewership ===
Whip Media, which tracks viewership data for the more than 21 million worldwide users of its TV Time app, calculated that The Guardians of the Galaxy Holiday Special was the top-streamed film in the U.S. for the week ending November 27. It remained among the five most-streamed films from the week ending December 11 to the week ending December 18. Streaming analytics firm FlixPatrol, which monitors daily updated VOD charts and streaming ratings across the globe, reported that The Guardians of the Galaxy Holiday Special was the third most-popular title on Disney+ in December 2022.

=== Critical response ===
The review aggregator website Rotten Tomatoes reported a 95% approval rating, with an average score of 7.9/10, based on 64 reviews. The site's critic's consensus states: "More of a stocking stuffer than a fully-rounded parcel, this yuletide excursion is a delightful showcase for Drax, Mantis, and a very game Kevin Bacon." Metacritic, which uses a weighted average, assigned the special a score of 80 out of 100 based on nine critics, indicating "universal acclaim".

Jordan Moreau of Variety felt the special was "stuffed with funny, feel-good Christmas joy, and it's one of the best pieces of content Marvel Studios has released in years." Moreau praised James Gunn's delivery of his "signature, laugh-out-loud, zany" style in the special with a short runtime, how it "pays homage to the nostalgic tropes of Christmas specials", the depiction of Drax and Mantis, and its soundtracks and songs. Angie Han of The Hollywood Reporter felt that the special was "funny enough to provoke out-loud laughter and poignant enough to elicit that telltale sting behind the eyes, if not quite enough to draw full-on tears. Maybe it lacks the heft of a true Guardians feature or series, but it's exactly the holiday confection you'd want from this motley crew: shiny, fluffy and just odd enough to feel personal" and lauded the "delightfully eclectic" soundtrack. Han also felt that the special became the first Marvel Cinematic Universe entry to have a Christmas-themed story instead of setting it in December to coincide with the holiday, such as Iron Man 3 (2013) and Hawkeye (2021). However, Han noted the special being "as slick a bit of marketing as they come... to remind audiences how much we love these characters, who haven't headlined a big-screen adventure in five years [since Guardians of the Galaxy Vol. 2 (2017)]", and how it had a script "sprinkled with crumbs of awkward exposition" and was "underwritten by the kind of studio clout and money that can get a Kevin Bacon to show up and hang out with aliens for a few days."

Chris Hewitt gave the special 3 out of 5 stars for Empire Online, feeling that it was "so frothy, and fun, and so clearly not intended to be taken seriously." Hewitt described the special as Guardians 2.5 "with a little Christmas riffing on the soundtrack", a "variety show with the Guardians at its centre", and a "ballsy nod" to Star Wars Holiday Special (1978). Hewitt praised Bautista and Klementieff's performances but criticized the scenes involving Bacon as "disappointingly toothless". Chris Evangelista of /Film felt the special was "mighty silly and mighty light. In fact, it's so light that it's a wonder it even exists", adding that "writer-director James Gunn didn't really have enough to fill out an entire special, which means we're treated to multiple musical numbers and multiple montages to pad the runtime. At the same time, Gunn and his cast manage to slip in one final emotional beat that genuinely works." Evangelista noted that majority of the Guardians only did quick cameos, particularly Peter Quill, Rocket, and Groot, but saw Klementieff and Bautista's characters "an unlikely but very amusing pair". Evangelista also felt that Bacon was "fine, and clearly game to have fun here. But the concept of bringing [him] back for Quill is never as funny as the special seems to think it is" while criticizing the special's "predictable humor and not one but two different lengthy musical numbers that play more like time-fillers than anything else."

=== Accolades ===
Accolades received by The Guardians of the Galaxy Holiday Special
Award	Year	Category	Recipient(s)	Result	Ref.
California On Location Awards	December 4, 2022	Location Manager of the Year – Episodic Television – Half Hour	Michael Wesley	Nominated	
Children's and Family Emmy Awards	December 16–17, 2023	Outstanding Fiction Special	The Guardians of the Galaxy Holiday Special	Won	
Children's and Family Emmy Awards	December 16–17, 2023	Outstanding Directing For A Single Camera Program	James Gunn	Nominated	
Children's and Family Emmy Awards	December 16–17, 2023	Outstanding Music Direction and Composition for a Live Action Program	John Murphy	Nominated	
Children's and Family Emmy Awards	December 16–17, 2023	Outstanding Art Direction/Set Decoration/Scenic Design	Alan Hook, Dave Scott, Sam Avila, Zach Fannin, Lorin Flemming, Brittany Hites, Alex McCarroll, Rosemary Brandenburg	Nominated	
Children's and Family Emmy Awards	December 16–17, 2023	Outstanding Costume Design/Styling	Judianna Makovsky	Won	
Children's and Family Emmy Awards	December 16–17, 2023	Outstanding Makeup and Hairstyling	Cassie Russek, Stephanie Fenner, Alexei Dmitrew, Melissa Meinhart, Scott Stoddard, LuAndra Whitehurst	Won	
Children's and Family Emmy Awards	December 16–17, 2023	Outstanding Stunt Coordination for a Live Action Program	Heidi Moneymaker	Won	
Golden Trailer Awards	June 29, 2023	Best Voice Over for a TV/Streaming Series (Trailer/Teaser/TV Spot)	The Guardians of the Galaxy Holiday Special	Nominated	
Golden Trailer Awards	June 29, 2023	Best BTS/EPK for a TV/Streaming Series (Under 2 Minutes)	The Guardians of the Galaxy Holiday Special	Won	
Hollywood Makeup Artist and Hair Stylist Guild Awards	February 11, 2023	Best Period and/or Character Makeup – Television Special, One Hour or More Live Program Series	Michael Ornelaz, Matt Sprunger, Jon Moore, Robin Pritchard	Won	
Hollywood Makeup Artist and Hair Stylist Guild Awards	February 11, 2023	Best Special Makeup Effects – Television Special, One Hour or More Live Program Series	Alexei Dmitriew, Scott Stoddard, LuAndra Whitehurst, Mo Meinhart	Won	
Hollywood Makeup Artist and Hair Stylist Guild Awards	February 11, 2023	Best Period and/or Character Hair Styling – Television Special, One Hour or More Live Program Series	Cassie Russek, Amber Shani Hamilton, Sean Smith, Dugg Kirkpatrick	Nominated	

== See also ==
- List of Christmas films
