= Gamora (disambiguation) =

Gamora may refer to:

- Gamora, the Marvel Comics character
- Gamora (Marvel Cinematic Universe), the Marvel Cinematic Universe film version
- "Gamora" (MPower), an episode of MPower
