= Rocket (Marvel Cinematic Universe) =

Character in the Marvel Cinematic Universe

Rocket Raccoon
- Marvel Cinematic Universe character
- Rocket as depicted in Guardians of the Galaxy Vol. 3 (2023)
- First appearance: Guardians of the Galaxy (2014)
- Based on: Rocket Raccoon by: Bill Mantlo; Keith Giffen
- Adapted by: James Gunn; Nicole Perlman
- Voiced by: Bradley Cooper; Sean Gunn (young, Vol. 3); Noah Raskin (infant, Vol. 3)
- On-set acting by: Sean Gunn

In-universe information
- Full name: Rocket Raccoon
- Alias: Subject: 89P13
- Species: Raccoon
- Occupation: Captain of the Guardians of the Galaxy; Bounty hunter; Mercenary
- Affiliation: Guardians of the Galaxy: Avengers
- Fighting style: Marksmanship with alien firearms and cybernetic augmentations
- Weapon: Various ion and laser cannons and blasters; Hadron Enforcer
- Children: Groot (adoptive son)
- Origin: Earth

Rocket Raccoon, commonly referred to simply as Rocket, is a fictional character in the Marvel Cinematic Universe (MCU) media franchise voiced by Bradley Cooper and based on the Marvel Comics character of the same name. Rocket was based on movements from Sean Gunn and an actual raccoon named Oreo. Rocket is a hot-tempered mercenary bio-mechanical raccoon and weapons expert who, along with his companion Groot, joins the Guardians of the Galaxy. They then come into conflict with Ronan the Accuser and Ego. Following the Blip, Rocket remains on Earth as a member of the Avengers. Five years later, Rocket and the Avengers quantum time travel to alternate universes to find the Infinity Stones. Following their success, Rocket joins the battle against an alternate Thanos, and rejoins the Guardians after their victory; departing for space. Later, he and the Guardians make their base on Knowhere before coming into conflict with Rocket's creator, the High Evolutionary. Rocket then assumes leadership of the Guardians of the Galaxy.

Rocket made his first appearance in Guardians of the Galaxy (2014), and has become a central MCU character, appearing in six films as of 2024, in two episodes of the I Am Groot series of animated shorts on Disney+, and in the TV special The Guardians of the Galaxy Holiday Special (2022).

== Fictional character biography ==
=== Origins ===
Rocket, originally named Subject: 89P13, was abducted from North America on Earth by the High Evolutionary and taken aboard his ship into space. He is subjected to illegal genetic and cybernetic experiments and placed in another cage of three other genetically and cybernetically tested animals in Batch 89, an otter named Lylla, a walrus named Teefs, and a white rabbit named Floor that he becomes friends with. 89P13 names himself Rocket after wanting to make flying ships and explore the sky with his friends. Rocket shows extreme intelligence, finding the flaw in the High Evolutionary's design to accelerate animal evolution that made them violent. The High Evolutionary plans to harvest Rocket's brain for further research and kill the rest of Batch 89. Rocket escapes his cage and frees Lylla before the High Evolutionary shoots her. Rocket mauls the High Evolutionary's face off in response, and Teefs and Floor are killed during crossfire with the High Evolutionary's guards, after which Rocket escapes.

At some point in his travels after escaping, Rocket becomes friends and partners with Groot, a sentient anthropomorphic tree.

=== Guardian of the Galaxy ===
In 2014, Rocket and Groot travel to Xandar, where they try to capture Peter Quill for a bounty, interfering in a fight between Quill and Gamora over possession of the Power Stone that Quill had acquired. All four are captured by the Nova Corps and sent to the space prison, the Kyln. Rocket devises a plan to escape from the Kyln, and they escape along with Drax the Destroyer, another inmate. The five then travel to Knowhere to sell the Power Stone, where Rocket and Drax have a heated argument. After Drax drunkenly calls Ronan the Accuser to confront him, Ronan acquires the Power Stone. Rocket resists further involvement in the affair, but Groot persuades him to rescue Quill and Gamora from the Ravagers, and Quill then persuades all five of them to attempt to stop Ronan. As other members of the team battle Ronan aboard his ship, the Dark Aster, Rocket crashes a Ravager ship through the Dark Aster, which crash-lands on Xandar. Groot sacrifices himself to shield Rocket and the team, and the remaining Guardians are able to gain control of the Power Stone and destroy Ronan. Rocket plants a sapling cut from Groot in a pot, which grows into a baby of his species, whom Rocket adopts, also naming Groot in his biological father's honor.

=== Facing Ego ===
Two months later, Rocket and the Guardians are hired by the Sovereign to fight off an alien attacking their valuable batteries, in exchange for Nebula. Annoyed by the arrogance of the Sovereign, Rocket steals some of their batteries, leading the Sovereign fleet to chase and attack the Guardians' ship. They crash land on a planet, where Quill meets his father, revealed to be Ego, a primordial Celestial who manifests a human avatar that allows him to interact with other races. Quill, Gamora, and Drax go with Ego to his planet while Rocket and Groot stay behind to watch Nebula and repair the ship. Ravagers arrive searching for Quill and, after a fight, capture Rocket and Groot and free Nebula. The Ravagers mutiny against their leader, Yondu, and aboard the Ravager ship, Rocket and Yondu plot their escape, eventually destroying most of the Ravager vessel except for a breakaway quarter, called the Quadrant, in which they travel to Ego. They learn that Ego is an evil living planet intent on dominating the universe. Quill keeps Ego occupied in combat with his newfound Celestial powers until Rocket is able to assemble a bomb, which the baby Groot places in Ego's brain. Later, Rocket and the rest of the Guardians, including new member Mantis, hold a funeral for Yondu.

Sometime later, Rocket hears an explosion in the Quadrant and investigates, finding Groot. Rocket finds himself unable to stay mad when Groot gives Rocket an artistic drawing he made of the Guardians. Rocket is then almost sucked out of the ship before Groot saves him. (Note: As depicted in the I Am Groot short "Magnum Opus".)

=== Infinity War ===
Four years later, Rocket and the Guardians respond to a distress signal and end up rescuing Thor, who is floating in space amidst the wreckage of the Statesman. Gamora tells them of the plan to obtain the Infinity Stones, and the Guardians split up, with Rocket and Groot accompanying Thor to Nidavellir to create a new weapon. On the way, Rocket gives Thor a replacement for an eye Thor has lost. They find an abandoned Nidavellir and meet the dwarf king Eitri. The four work together to create Stormbreaker, a powerful axe that also grants Thor the power of the Bifröst. Thor transports himself, Rocket, and Groot to Wakanda on Earth via the Bifröst to help members of the Avengers and the Wakandan army in the battle against the Outriders. During the battle, Rocket asks Bucky Barnes if he can have his arm, but after being declined, he vows to get it. Later, Rocket watches helplessly as Groot weakly calls out "I am Groot" one final time as he disappears in the Blip. Director James Gunn revealed that this phrase translated to "...Dad?" as Groot looked to Rocket for help.

=== Member of the Avengers ===
Rocket, along with Steve Rogers, Natasha Romanoff, Bruce Banner, James Rhodes and Thor, depart on the Quinjet and arrive at the Avengers Compound. Shortly after, they are met by Carol Danvers. Three weeks later, they witness Danvers bringing Tony Stark and Nebula back on the Benatar, and Rocket realizes that only he and Nebula were the remaining Guardians. After detecting another energy surge, Thor, Rogers, Romanoff, Rhodes, Banner, Danvers, and Nebula go into space to the Garden planet where they confront Thanos about the Stones. However, Rocket finds that the Gauntlet is empty, in which Thanos reveals he destroyed the Stones, causing Thor to abruptly kill him. With nothing left to do, they return to Earth.

Rocket then becomes a member of the Avengers and works on missions in space with Nebula, under Rogers' and Romanoff's leadership. In 2023, when a means is discovered to use quantum time travel to reverse the Blip, Rocket and Nebula return to the Compound. Rocket then accompanies Banner to New Asgard to convince a depressed Thor to return to help with the effort, while also meeting Valkyrie, Korg, and Miek. Rocket, Banner and Thor return to the Compound and Rocket aids Stark in building a quantum tunnel in the Compound's hangar. Afterwards, Rocket participates in the Time Heist brainstorming. When they are ready to go, he suits up in the Avengers Quantum suit, listens to Rogers' speech, and gives his spaceship to Clint Barton. Using the quantum tunnel, Rocket and Thor travel through the Quantum Realm to an alternate 2013 timeline and go to Asgard to get the Reality Stone, during the time when it had been absorbed into Jane Foster. They retrieve the Stone and return to the Compound in the main timeline, but after Banner uses the new Infinity Gauntlet to undo the Blip, an alternate Thanos attacks, trapping Rocket, Rhodes, and Banner underneath the destroyed Compound. Scott Lang, in his Giant-Man form, saves them, and Rocket joins the battle against alternate Thanos' army, where he is reunited with Groot. A week later, Rocket and the reunited Guardians of the Galaxy attend Stark's funeral at Stark's house. They then return to New Asgard to pick Thor up and depart for space.

=== Guardians reassembled and confronting his past ===
Rocket, Thor, and the rest of the Guardians return to space and embark on several adventures, while reuniting with Kraglin, who joins the team. In 2025, after arriving on Indigarr, they are joined by Korg and fight off an invading army. Afterwards, they learn of several distress calls caused by a god killer and split up from Thor, as he sets off to locate Sif.

Few months later, the Guardians buy Knowhere from the Collector, and Rocket befriends Cosmo who joins their team. Rocket and the Guardians then work on rebuilding Knowhere following its attack. Later that year, Rocket participates in the Christmas celebration and is given Barnes' arm by Nebula as a gift.

In 2026, after finishing their rebuilding of Knowhere, the Guardians are attacked by Adam, a superpowered being created by his "mother" Ayesha. During the fight, Rocket is seriously injured, leaving the Guardians unable to tend to his wounds due to a kill switch embedded in him. The team resolves to travel to the Orgosphere, headquarters of Orgocorp, in the hopes of finding an override code. Meanwhile, Rocket's creator, the High Evolutionary, becomes obsessed with retrieving his subject. At the same time, Ayesha seeks revenge against the Guardians for Rocket's previous theft of her property. With the assistance of the Ravagers and the alternate variant of Gamora, the Guardians infiltrate Orgosphere and retrieve Rocket's file. However, they are attacked by Orgosphere's guards, barely escaping. The team next visit Counter-Earth, and then split up, with Quill, Nebula, and Groot boarding the High Evolutionary's ship in search of a scientist named Theel, believed to have information that can save Rocket. Drax, Mantis, and Gamora initially remain on the planet with Rocket, but Drax and Mantis later leave, and Warlock arrives looking for Rocket, and fights Gamora, who manages to escape with Rocket in the Guardians' ship. Rocket flatlines and has a near-death experience, where he is met by his former childhood friends, Lylla, Teefs, and Floor, who tell him that his time has not yet come before Quill successfully implements the override code and revives him. A battle ensues on the High Evolutionary's ship, during which Rocket discovers a litter of baby raccoons and other test subject animals but is attacked by a deranged High Evolutionary while attempting to free them. As Rocket battles the villain, he proclaims his true name is Rocket Raccoon before being aided by the Guardians. Together, the Guardians, who have learned of the High Evolutionary's sadistic treatment of Rocket and his friends to their outrage, defeat the villain in a punishing combined attack until he is left helpless with Rocket's previous mauling of him exposed. Rocket declines to finish him off as he and the Guardians rescue the caged animals from the doomed ship. The Guardians also bring the High Evolutionary with them to be imprisoned on Knowhere. The Guardians, in their current form, decide to disband upon returning to Knowhere, with Quill bestowing the captaincy upon Rocket before leaving for Earth.

Rocket leads a new Guardians lineup, consisting of himself, Groot, Cosmo, Kraglin, a reformed Adam with his pet Blurp, and the High Evolutionary's recent creation Phyla. Sometime later, they go to a planet to help the inhabitants there.

== Alternate versions ==
Alternate versions of Rocket appear in the animated series What If...? as non-speaking characters.

=== Thor's party ===
In an alternate 2011, Rocket participates in Thor's intergalactic party on Earth in Las Vegas.

=== Cyborg Rocket ===
A cyborg version of Rocket was among the universal killers and righteous heroes from different realities who were abducted by Doctor Strange Supreme to feed to the Forge, until they were freed by Captain Peggy Carter and returned home by Kahhori.

=== Zombie Apocalypse ===
In an alternate 2018, Rocket accompanied Groot and Thor in battling against Thanos in Wakanda, who was caught up by the zombie infection. Rocket and Groot were subsequently vaporized by Thanos, with only Rocket's skull remaining.

== Concept and creation ==
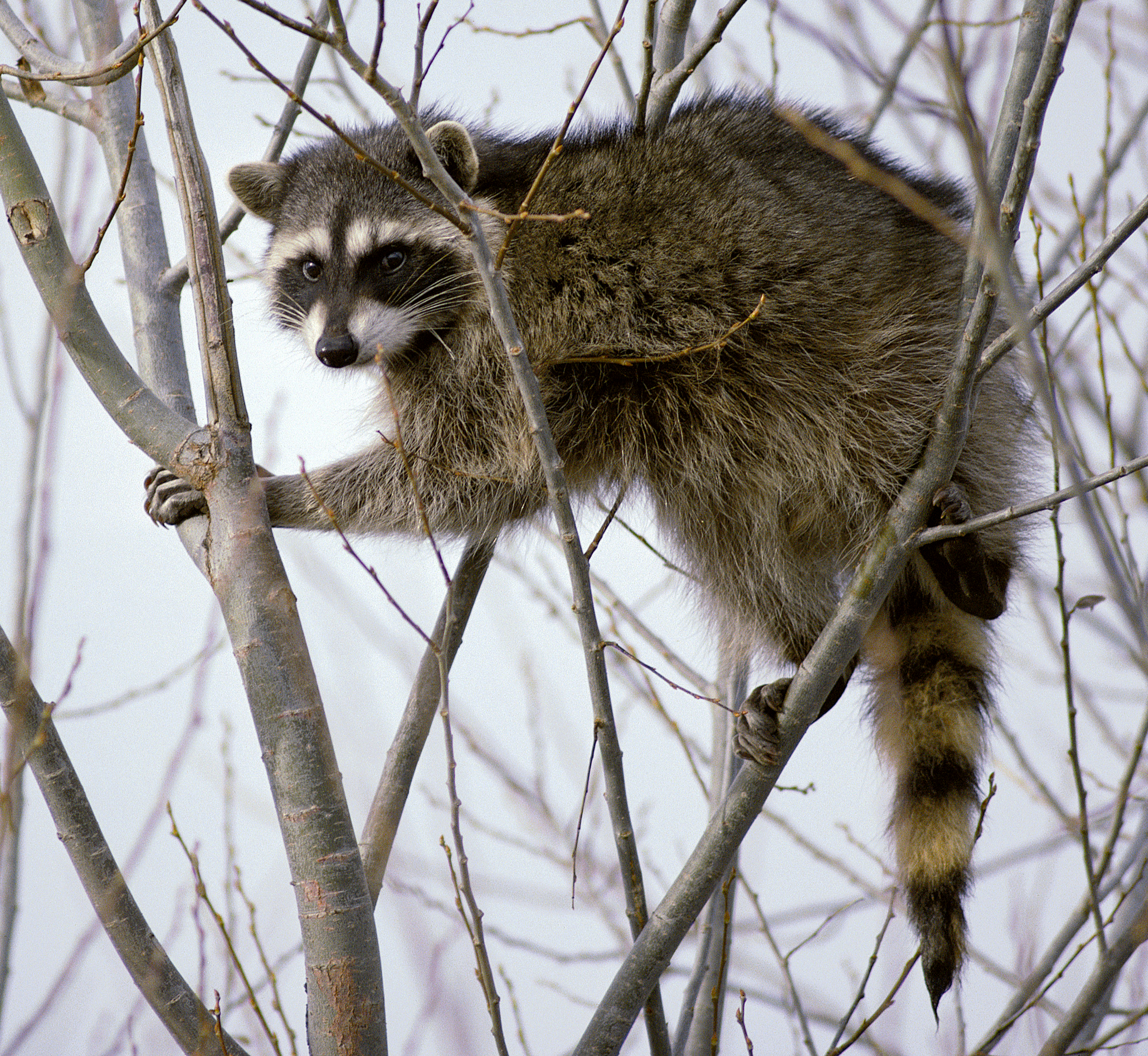
A typical raccoon.

The comic book character was created by Bill Mantlo and Keith Giffen, and inspired by the Beatles song "Rocky Raccoon". Rocket Raccoon first appeared in Marvel Preview #7 (Summer 1976), in the back-up feature "The Sword in the Star", under the name "Rocky". He would next appear in The Incredible Hulk #271 (May 1982), where it is learned that "Rocky" is short for "Rocket". In 1985, he received his own four-issue limited series and in an afterword to the first issue, Mantlo himself asserted that this was the same character seen in Preview, penciled by Mike Mignola and inked by Al Gordon with Al Milgrom. Rocket appeared in Quasar #15 in 1990 and later appeared in three issues of Sensational She-Hulk in 1992 (#44–46). The character only appeared in a total of ten comic books in his first thirty years of existence. Besides a brief appearance in a 2006 issue of Exiles, Rocket Raccoon was next seen in 2007's Annihilation: Conquest and Annihilation: Conquest - Star-Lord limited series, and their spin-off series, a new volume of Guardians of the Galaxy. He remained a regular member of the series cast until it was canceled with issue #25 in 2010.

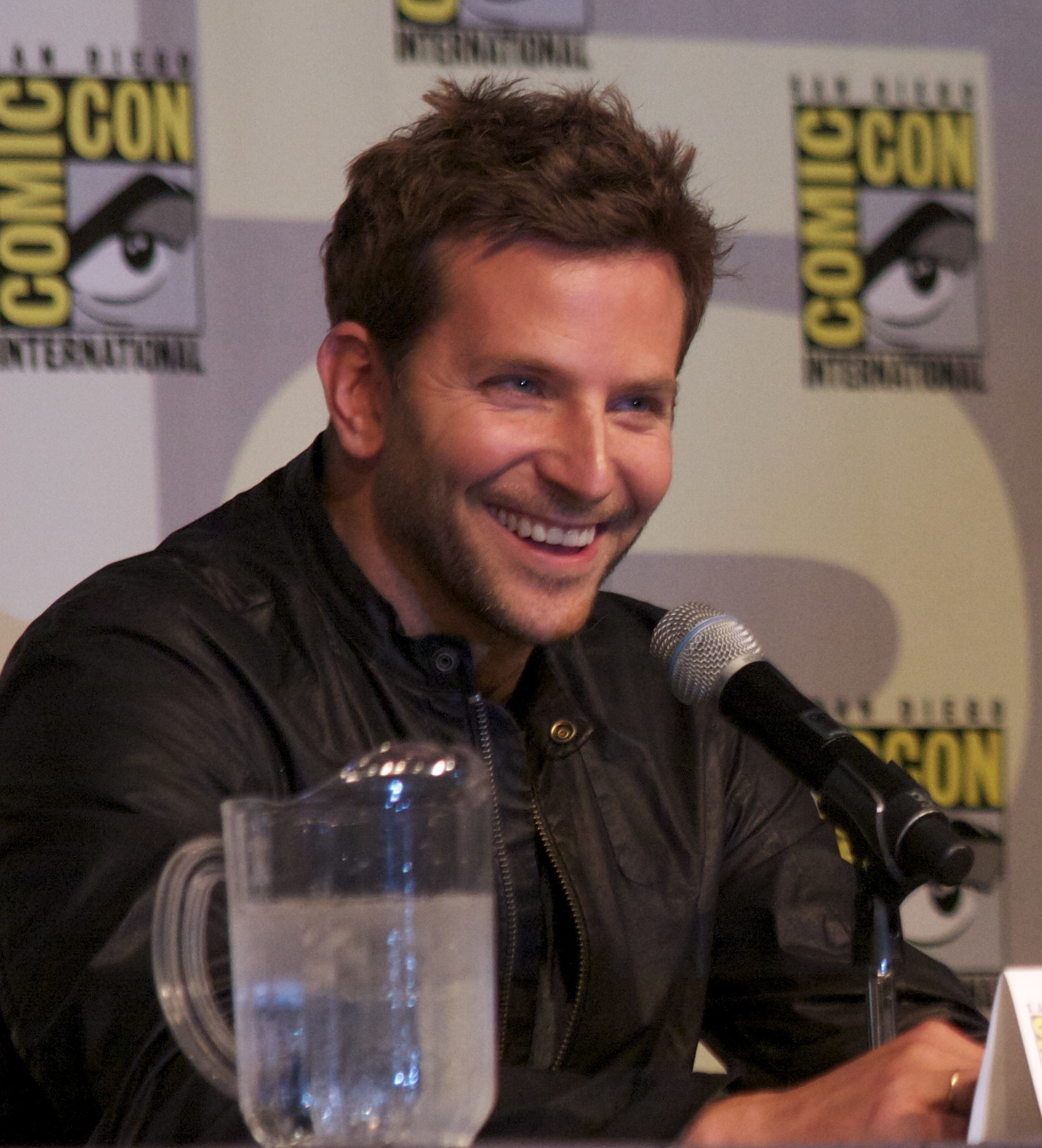
Bradley Cooper, the voice of Rocket, pictured here in 2011

Marvel Studios President Kevin Feige first mentioned Guardians of the Galaxy as a potential film at the 2010 San Diego Comic-Con, stating, "There are some obscure titles, too, like Guardians of the Galaxy. I think they've been revamped recently in a fun way in the [comic] book." Feige reiterated that sentiment in a September 2011 issue of Entertainment Weekly, saying, "There's an opportunity to do a big space epic, which Thor sort of hints at, in the cosmic side" of the Marvel Cinematic Universe. Feige added, should the film be made, it would feature an ensemble of characters, similar to X-Men and The Avengers. Throughout the writing process, there was some debate on whether keeping Rocket as a member of the Guardians or even featuring the character at all in the film due to concerns that he could come off as "too cartoonish", hence why a few drafts excluded the character, but Nicole Perlman felt that the character's inclusion was necessary and was happy at Feige letting her keep in the script due to him being a great Rocket fan. Feige announced that the film was in active development at the 2012 San Diego Comic-Con during the Marvel Studios panel, with an intended release date of August 1, 2014. He said the film's titular team would consist of the characters Star-Lord, Drax the Destroyer, Gamora, Groot, and Rocket. In August 2013, Marvel announced that Bradley Cooper would voice Rocket in Guardians of the Galaxy.

== Characterization ==
In Guardians of the Galaxy, Rocket was characterized as a genetically engineered raccoon bounty hunter, mercenary, and master of weapons and battle tactics. Gunn worked with live raccoons to get the correct feel for the character, and to make sure it was "not a cartoon character", saying, "It's not Bugs Bunny in the middle of the Avengers, it's a real, little, somewhat mangled beast that's alone. There's no one else in the universe quite like him, he's been created by these guys to be a mean-ass fighting machine". Gunn also based the character on himself. Describing Rocket in relation to the rest of the Guardians, Cooper said, "I think Rocket is dynamic. He's the sort of Joe Pesci in Goodfellas guy."

Cooper voiced Rocket, while Sean Gunn (James' younger brother) provided on-set acting for the character during filming. James Gunn said that for the role of Rocket, some physical movements from Cooper, including facial expressions and hand movements, were recorded as potential references for the animators, though much of Sean Gunn's acting is used throughout the film. Sean noted they "kind of stumbled" into the process of him performing on set since they "weren't sure how we were going to create that character". The same process continued to be used for all subsequent appearances of Rocket. Before Cooper was cast, James Gunn said that it was a challenge finding a voice for Rocket, that he was looking for someone who could balance "the fast-talking speech patterns that Rocket has, but also can be funny, because he is really funny. But also has the heart that Rocket has. Because there are actually some pretty dramatic scenes with Rocket." In addition to Cooper's voice and Sean Gunn's movements, the appearance of Rocket was based on an actual raccoon named Oreo. James Gunn said of the process, "We needed a raccoon to study how he looked and his behavior, so that our on-screen raccoon, which is generated through CGI will be realistic. Our Rocket is based on a combination of our voice actor, Bradley Cooper, our on-set actor, my brother Sean Gunn, the movements and behavior and look of Oreo [the raccoon], as well as my own animation". Gunn brought Oreo to the red carpet premiere of the film.

In Guardians of the Galaxy Vol. 2, Sean Gunn once again served as on-set actor for Rocket during filming, with Cooper's performance also referenced. Sean Gunn said that "Rocket has the same sort of crisis of faith [that he had in the first film] about whether or not he belongs in this family", with James Gunn adding, "this is really about Rocket coming to terms with accepting his place within a group of people, which probably seemed like a good idea" when they were heroes together at the end of the first film, but now "he's just not very comfortable with the idea". Feige stated that the relationship between Rocket and Groot has changed, saying, "Groot was Rocket's protector in the first movie, [and now] Rocket is Groot's protector." Oreo died in 2019, at the age of ten.

For Guardians of the Galaxy Vol. 3, Gunn said that the film tells Rocket's story, including his background and "where he's going", along with how that ties into the other Guardians and the end of this iteration of the team. The film completes a character arc that was established in Guardians of the Galaxy and Guardians of the Galaxy Vol. 2 (2017), and continued in Infinity War and Endgame. Sean Gunn once again provided on-set acting for the character, while also voicing young Rocket. Cooper also voiced adolescent Rocket while Noah Raskin voiced baby Rocket.

== In other media ==
=== Theme parks ===
Rocket appears in Guardians of the Galaxy – Mission: Breakout! at Disney California Adventure, Guardians of the Galaxy: Cosmic Rewind at Epcot, and in the preshow of Avengers Assemble: Flight Force at Walt Disney Studios Park. Cooper reprises the voice role for the character's appearance in Mission Breakout!.

== Reception ==
=== Critical reception ===
Dominic Lerose of The Daily Cardinal called Rocket Raccoon a "top fan favorite," writing, "Rocket is the only surviving member of the Guardians of the Galaxy after Thanos' snap for good reason. He's the most interesting out of them all, the most emotionally vulnerable and a character audiences love not only for his cuteness and humor, but for his saddened soul and desire to fit into the dramatic universe of Marvel. Let's hope we get to see a lot of Rocket Raccoon in Avengers: Endgame next month, and let's hope he makes it out alive so we can see more of him in the future."

=== Accolades ===
- In 2014, CBR.com included Rocket Raccoon in their "Marvel and DC's Greatest Animal Characters" list.
- In 2018, CBR.com ranked Rocket Raccoon 25th in their "25 Most Powerful Guardians Of The Galaxy" list.
- In 2021, Screen Rant ranked Rocket Raccoon 19th in their "20 Most Powerful Guardians Of The Galaxy Members In The Comics" list.
- In 2022, The A.V Club ranked Rocket Raccoon 44th in their "100 best Marvel characters" list.

Year	Award	Nominated work	Category	Result	Ref.
2015	MTV Movie Awards	Guardians of the Galaxy	Best On-Screen Duo (with Vin Diesel)	Nominated	
2017	Washington D.C. Area Film Critics Association	Guardians of the Galaxy Vol. 2	Best Voice Performance	Nominated	
2024	North Carolina Film Critics Association	Guardians of the Galaxy Vol. 3	Best Vocal Performance in Animation or Mixed Media	Nominated	
2024	Astra Film Awards	Guardians of the Galaxy Vol. 3	Best Voice-Over Performance	Nominated	
2024	Utah Film Critics Association	Guardians of the Galaxy Vol. 3	Vice/Martin Award for Performance in a Science-Fiction, Fantasy, or Horror Film	Nominated	
2024	Austin Film Critics Association	Guardians of the Galaxy Vol. 3	Best Voice Acting/Animated/Digital Performance	Won	
2024	Critics' Choice Super Awards	Guardians of the Galaxy Vol. 3	Best Actor in a Superhero Movie	Nominated	

== See also ==
- Characters of the Marvel Cinematic Universe
