= Maps of celebrity homes =

Maps indicating the residences of celebrities, notably in Hollywood

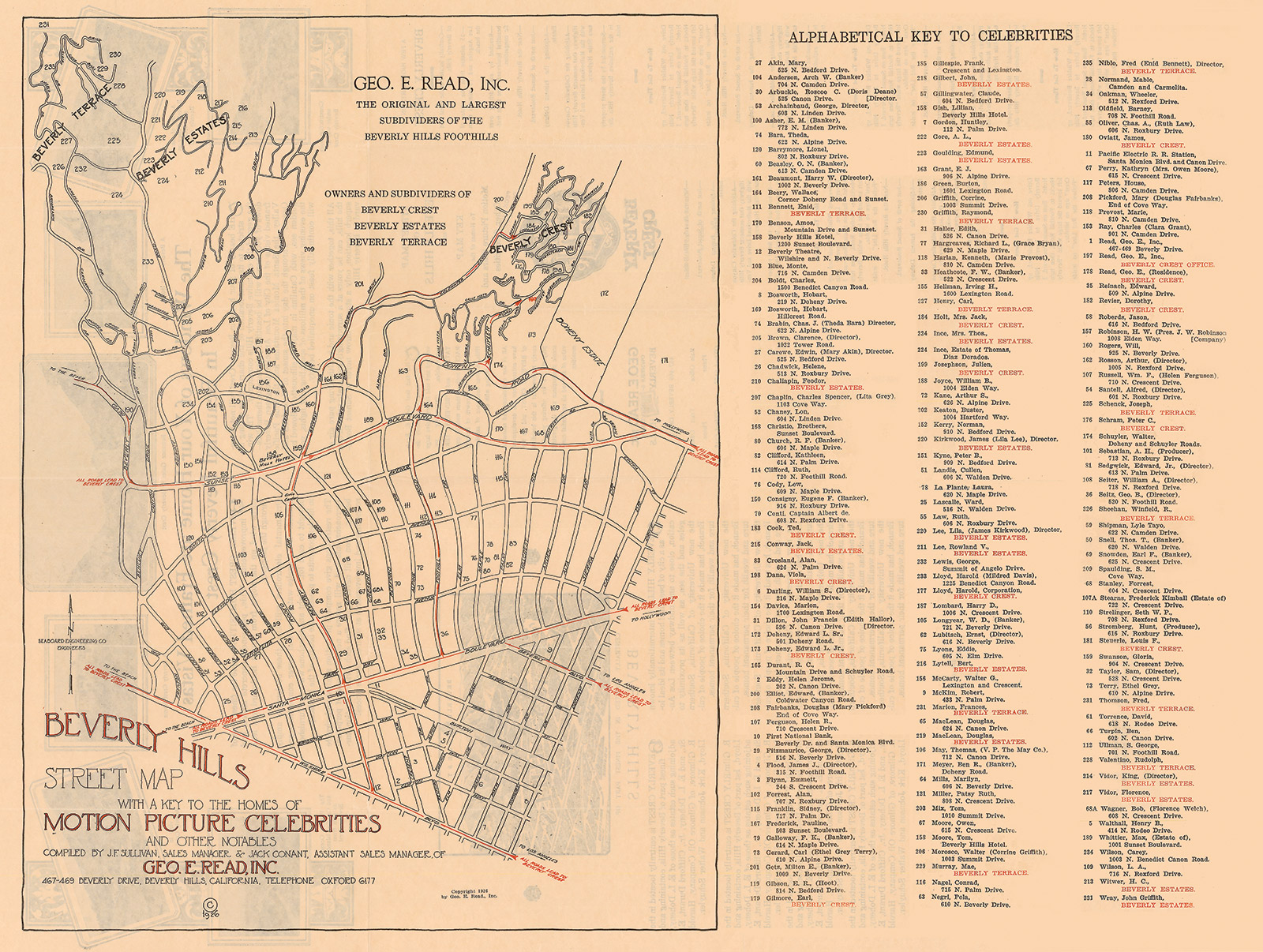
- Beverly Hills promotional celebrity map, 1926

Overview
- Also known as: Maps to the stars; Star maps
- Associated location: Hollywood, Los Angeles, California (and other cultural hubs)
- Medium: Printed maps, tourist guides, digital apps
- Earliest origin: Early 1920s
- Key concerns: Right to privacy; Security risks; Stalking and crime

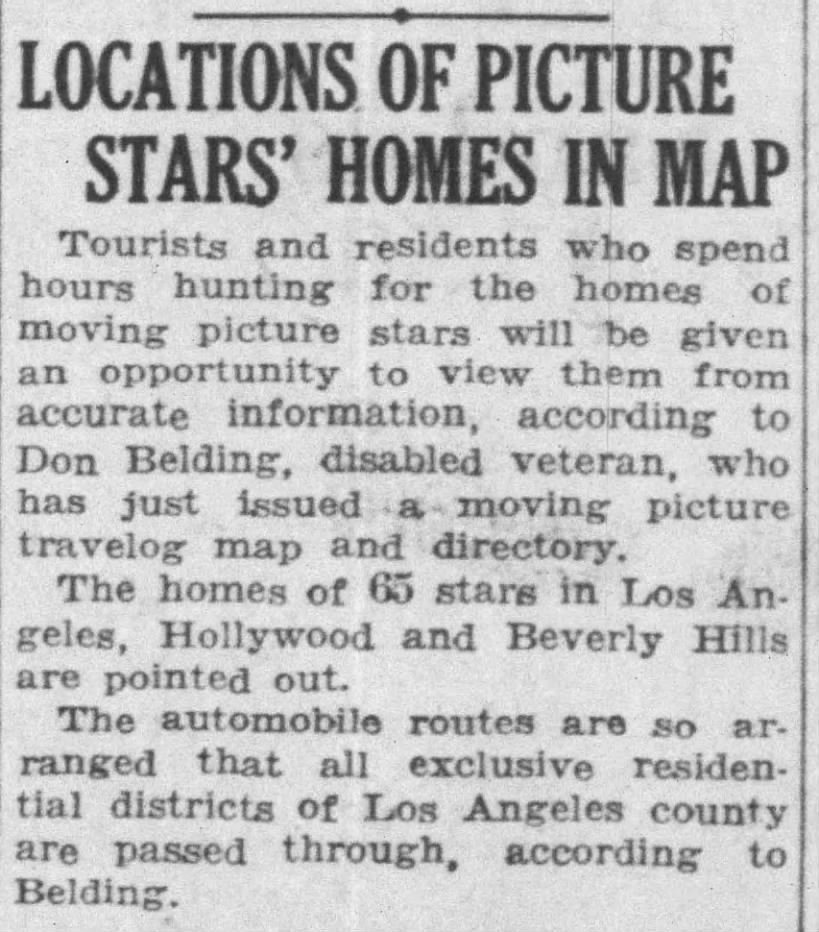
1924 L.A. Post article on celebrity home maps

Maps of celebrity homes, also known as maps to the stars or star maps, the most famous of these being Hollywood star maps, are maps produced and sold by various companies that purport to identify the home addresses at which various celebrities reside, most commonly Hollywood movie stars.

== Description ==
Maps purporting to show the locations of celebrity homes are available for purchase "on almost every Hollywood street corner" and "just about every major intersection in Beverly Hills", as well as other parts of the city. A staple of Hollywood for over a century, it is further noted that "their continued popularity indicates that fans have always sought the information necessary to track down celebrities in their private lives".

The Hollywood Reporter noted that maps provided by different companies often conflict with each other, and can contain out-of-date, misspelled, or otherwise inaccurate information. They have been described as "the most common sources of bad information", along with "real estate people in and around Hollywood". Although the maps "change from time to time", they generally contain useful information regarding the historic homes of stars from the past such as Lucille Ball and Marilyn Monroe. Older maps have been described as being "as much an archaeological dig as an atlas", and may include figures who were famous at the time, but "whose reputation has not endured".

== History ==
=== Hollywood origins ===
The earliest Hollywood star maps were created in the 1920s, with some movie studios "producing their own maps with directions to their stars' homes, cultivating the idea of celebrity and encouraging fans to see them as icons". A 1924 Los Angeles Evening Post-Record article describes, for example, how "tourists and residents who spend hours hunting for the homes of moving picture stars will be given an opportunity to view them from accurate information", from a map showing "homes of 65 stars in Los Angeles, Hollywood and Beverly Hills". A noted 1926 map of celebrity homes produced by developed George E. Read had a different purpose, to promote the marketing of residential properties in the area by highlighting their proximity to the stars.

In one anecdote from the 1960s, movie star Lee Marvin "won the Oscar for Best Actor, purchased a new home in Beverly Hills, then got so drunk he had to buy a movie star map to locate it". Producer David Permut described how, in 1969, at the age of 16, he published maps of celebrity homes for tourists, and sold them from a seat on the corner of Sunset Boulevard and Ladera Drive, near the homes of Elvis Presley and Fred Astaire; Permut recalled that Katharine Hepburn "would autograph his maps, making them big sellers".

In 2002, filmmaker Michael Moore related using a Hollywood star map to find the home of Charlton Heston, then president of the National Rifle Association of America, whom Moore then interviewed for the documentary Bowling for Columbine. Moore was later criticized by some for his perceived "ambush" of the actor. Concerns have been raised that efforts to publicize the location of celebrities will encourage stalking, robbery, and other criminal behaviors and infringements of the right to privacy.

=== Other places ===
Although most commonly associated with Hollywood, maps and mapped tours of celebrity homes have also been produced elsewhere. In London, the London Star Map, marketed during the 2000s, identified more than 50 celebrity homes, along with things like film locations, music landmarks and entertainment venues. The concept was subsequently adapted to digital media, and by 2014 a Celebrity Planet – London Star Map mobile application existed, using the app user's location to identify nearby celebrity homes, and other sites associated with famous people.

A comparable phenomenon developed around the Indian film industry. In 2012, a GPS-enabled application called Bollywood Star Homes offered a self-guided walking tour of celebrity residences in Mumbai, particularly in Bandra. The tour included more than 20 points of interest and identified the homes of film actors including Shah Rukh Khan, Salman Khan, Sanjay Dutt and members of the Bachchan family. It was also distributed with a digital booklet and map.

== In popular culture ==
In the 1978 Ringo Starr special, Ringo, one of Starr's dual roles is as a seller of Hollywood star maps named Ognir Rrats. In the 2022 Marvel Cinematic Universe production, The Guardians of the Galaxy Holiday Special, the characters Mantis and Drax use a Hollywood star map to visit celebrities, and ultimately to find the home of a fictionalized version of Kevin Bacon, whom they then kidnap and take into outer space.
