= Pom Klementieff =

French actress (born 1986)

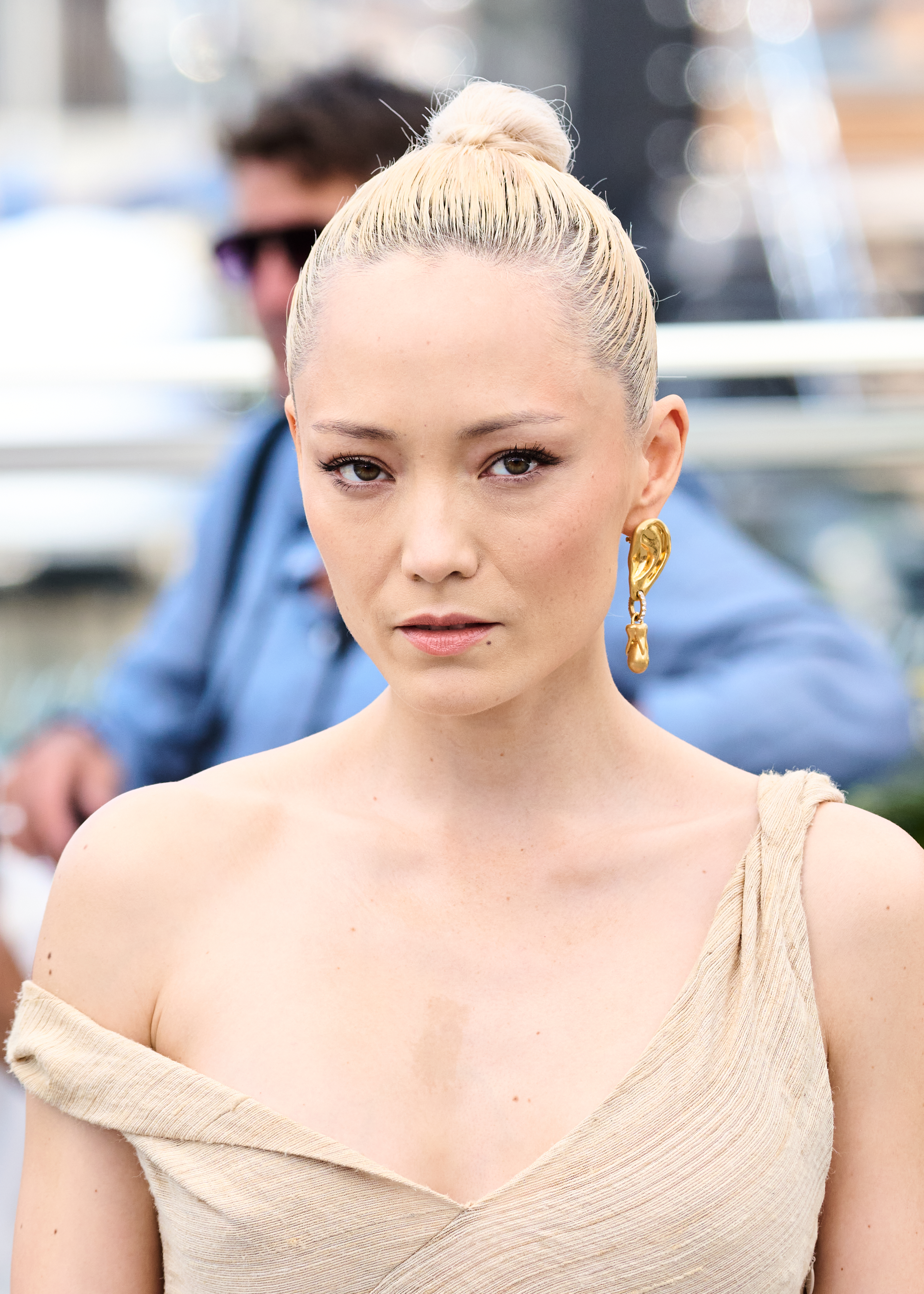
- Klementieff in 2025
- Born: Pom Alexandra Klementieff; 3 May 1986 (age 40); Quebec City, Canada
- Citizenship: France
- Occupation: Actress
- Years active: 2007–present

Pom Alexandra Klementieff (French: [pɔm klemɑ̃tjɛf]; born 3 May 1986) is a French actress. She is best known for playing Mantis in the Marvel Cinematic Universe (2017–2023), and Paris in the final two films of the Mission: Impossible series (2023–2025).

== Early life ==
Pom Alexandra Klementieff was born on 3 May 1986, in Quebec City, Canada, to Korean mother Yu Ri Park and Russian-French father Alexis Klementieff. Her father was a diplomat, serving as a consul for the Government of France, and was stationed in Seoul at one point. Her grandfather was the Russian painter Eugene Klementieff. Her parents chose the name Pom because it is similar in pronunciation to the Korean words for both 'spring' (봄) and 'tiger' (범).

Klementieff moved to Kyoto, Japan, then to the Ivory Coast, before returning to France and settling an hour away from Paris. Her father died of cancer when she was five, and her mother had schizophrenia and was unable to care for her children; she was therefore raised by her paternal uncle and aunt. Her uncle died on her 18th birthday, and her older brother Namou died by suicide seven years later, on her 25th birthday.

Klementieff moved to Paris to study law to appease her aunt after her uncle's death, but did not find it appealing. She also worked as a waitress and saleswoman in France. She started acting at age 19 at the Cours Florent drama school in Paris. A few months into her education, she won a theatre competition and two years of free classes with the school's top teachers.

== Career ==
=== 2007–2012: Early career ===
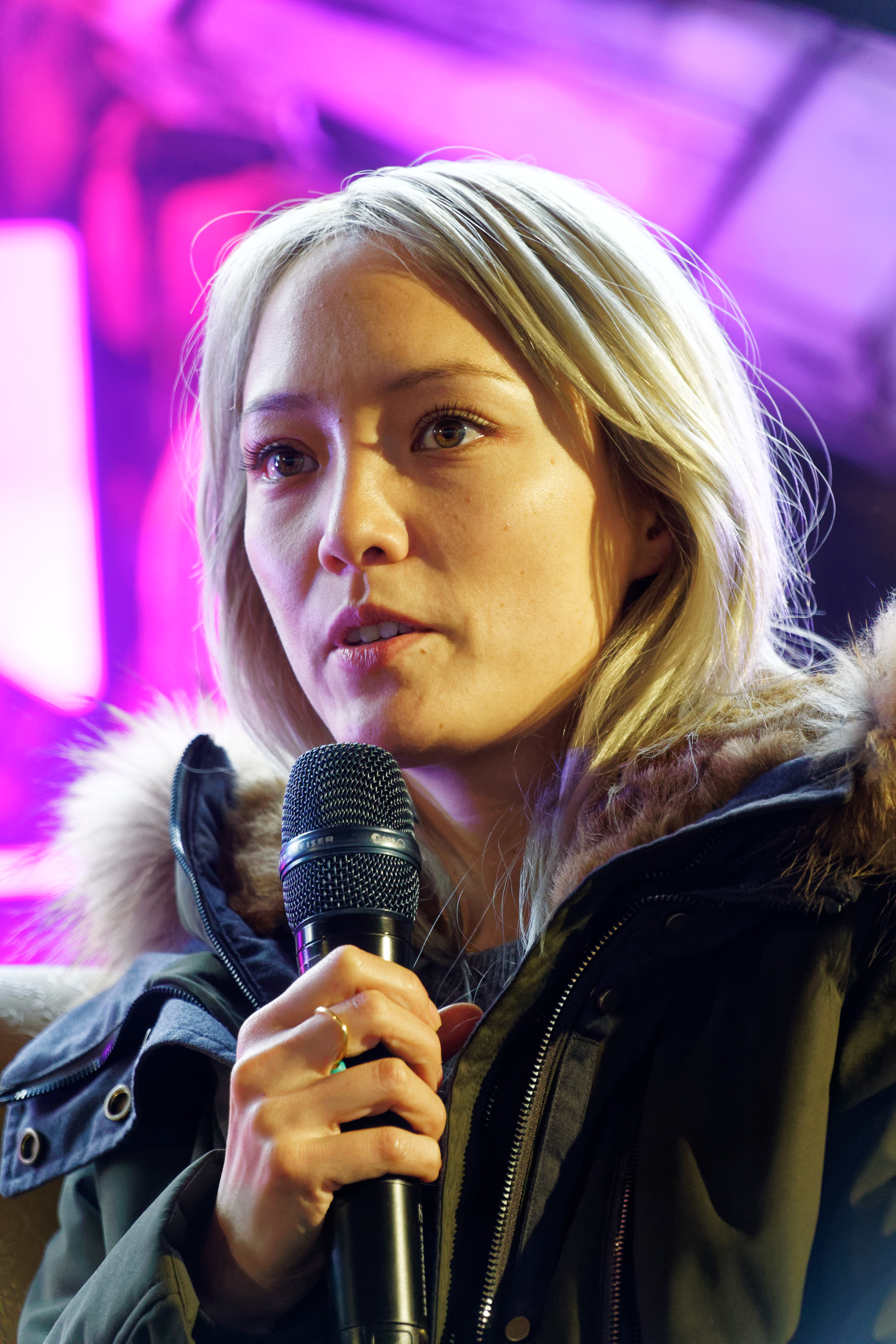
Klementieff at the 2018 Brussels Comic Con

Klementieff's first professional acting job was the French independent film Après lui (2007), portraying the stepdaughter of the protagonist played by Catherine Deneuve. Filming for her scenes took three days. In one scene, Klementieff was supposed to push someone down a set of stairs but accidentally fell down the stairs herself, and director Gaël Morel kept that shot in the final film.

Her first leading role was in Loup (2009), a French film about a tribe of reindeer herders in the Siberian mountains. During filming, Klementieff stayed in a camp, hours from the nearest village, where temperatures dropped well below zero. She befriended nomads who lived there, worked with real wolves, rode reindeer, and swam with a horse in a lake.

=== 2013–present: breakthrough ===
Klementieff made her Hollywood debut in Spike Lee's Oldboy (2013), a remake of the South Korean film of the same name. She portrayed Haeng-bok, the bodyguard of the antagonist played by Sharlto Copley. A fan of the original film, Klementieff heard about the part through Roy Lee, a producer with the remake, and took boxing lessons after learning the role involved martial arts. After showcasing her boxing skills during her audition, Lee asked her to go home and come back wearing a more feminine outfit and make-up, like her character in the film. She contributed some of her own clothes to the character's wardrobe, and trained three hours a day for two months for an on-screen fight with star Josh Brolin. Klementieff herself came up with the name Haeng-bok, Korean for "happiness", after Lee asked her to research possible names for the character.

Klementieff moved to Los Angeles after Oldboy was filmed and began pursuing more Hollywood auditions. She continued taekwondo after the film, and has a purple belt as of the summer of 2014. Her next acting role was the film Hacker's Game (2015), in which she plays a hacker she compared to Lisbeth Salander from the novel The Girl with the Dragon Tattoo. Klementieff used her boxing skills again in the film, and due to the movie's low budget, she had to do her own make-up and choose her own wardrobe. It was her idea to dye her hair purple for the role, to which the directors first objected but later acquiesced. In 2017, she appeared in the romance drama Newness, and the black comedy-drama Ingrid Goes West.

Klementieff received worldwide recognition when she joined the Marvel Cinematic Universe as Mantis, appearing in the films Guardians of the Galaxy Vol. 2 (2017), Avengers: Infinity War (2018), and Avengers: Endgame (2019). In 2019, she appeared in an episode of the Netflix science fiction anthology series Black Mirror, and the thriller film Uncut Gems, and had voice roles in the animated supernatural comedy film The Addams Family. In 2020, she had a recurring role as Martel in the HBO science fiction series Westworld.

In 2023 she reprised her role as Mantis in the Guardians of the Galaxy Vol. 3, and appeared as the enigmatic assassin Paris in Mission: Impossible – Dead Reckoning Part One. She reprised her role in Mission: Impossible – The Final Reckoning in 2025.

She played Marianna in the 2024 thriller The Killer's Game.

== Personal life ==
Klementieff is a martial artist and holds a purple belt in Taekwondo. She is also an avid skydiver. When filming for Mission: Impossible – Dead Reckoning Part One was completed, she was gifted skydiving lessons by Tom Cruise, after she expressed her desire to learn how to do so. During her 22 May 2025, appearance on The Tonight Show with Jimmy Fallon, she stated that she had done 233 jumps. Klementieff has stated in an interview that she learned English by watching Tina Fey in the American sitcom, 30 Rock.

Although Klementieff was born in Canada, she is not eligible for citizenship under Canadian nationality law due to her father being a diplomat. She had tried unsuccessfully to obtain dual French-Canadian citizenship.

== Filmography ==
=== Film ===
Year	Title	Role	Notes	Ref.
2007	Après lui (After Him)	Emilie		
2008	The Easy Way	NHI		
2009	Loup	Nastazya		
2011	Borderline	Naomi		
2011	Delicacy	The Waitress		
2011	Sleepless Night	Lucy		
2011	Love Lasts Three Years	Julia		
2011	Silhouettes	Valerie		
2012	Radiostars	The Pizza Girl		
2012	Porn in the Hood	Tia		
2012	El Turrrf	Pom	Short film	
2013	Paris Or Perish	Jess		
2013	Oldboy	Haeng-bok		
2015	Hacker's Game	Loise		
2017	Newness	Bethany		
2017	Ingrid Goes West	Harley Chung		
2017	Guardians of the Galaxy Vol. 2	Mantis		
2018	Avengers: Infinity War	Mantis		
2018	Time of Day	Herself	Short film	
2019	Avengers: Endgame	Mantis		
2019	Uncut Gems	Lexis	Deleted scenes	
2019	The Addams Family	Layla & Kayla	Voice role	
2021	Save Ralph	Cinnamon	Voice role; short film	
2021	Thunder Force	Laser		
2021	The Suicide Squad	Dancer	Uncredited cameo	
2022	Thor: Love and Thunder	Mantis		
2023	Guardians of the Galaxy Vol. 3	Mantis		
2023	Mission: Impossible – Dead Reckoning Part One	Paris		
2024	The Killer's Game	Marianna Antoinette		
2025	Mission: Impossible – The Final Reckoning	Paris		
2025	Superman	Superman Robot 5	Voice role	
2026	Mi Amor	Romy		
2027	The Beekeeper 2 †		Post-production	
2027	High in the Clouds †	Mina	Voice role; In production	

Key
†	Denotes films that have not yet been released

=== Television ===
Year	Title	Role	Notes	Ref.
2009	Pigalle, la nuit	Sandra	8 episodes	
2019	Black Mirror	Roxette	Episode: "Striking Vipers"	
2020	Westworld	Martel	3 episodes	
2022	The Guardians of the Galaxy Holiday Special	Mantis	Television Special	
2023	Marvel Studios: Assembled	Herself	Episode: "The Making of Guardians of the Galaxy Vol. 3 "	

=== Music Videos ===
Year	Title	Artist
2011	Around Town	The Kooks
