= Nebula (Marvel Cinematic Universe) =

Character in the Marvel Cinematic Universe

- Marvel Cinematic Universe character
- Karen Gillan as Nebula in Guardians of the Galaxy Vol. 3
- First appearance: Guardians of the Galaxy (2014)
- Last appearance: Guardians of the Galaxy Vol. 3 (2023)
- Based on: Nebula by: Roger Stern; John Buscema
- Adapted by: James Gunn; Nicole Perlman
- Portrayed by: Karen Gillan

In-universe information
- Full name: Nebula
- Nicknames: Blue Meanie; Nebby (What If...?)
- Species: Luphomoid
- Gender: Female
- Title: Super Nova (What If...? Season 2)
- Occupation: Assassin; Mercenary; Community leader
- Affiliation: Avengers; Guardians of the Galaxy; Children of Thanos; Ravagers (What If...? Season 1); Nova Corps (What If...? Season 2)
- Fighting style: Martial arts with superhuman and cybernetic physiology
- Weapon: Electroshock batons
- Family: Thanos (adoptive father); Gamora (adoptive sister); Corvus Glaive (adoptive brother); Cull Obsidian (adoptive brother); Ebony Maw (adoptive brother); Proxima Midnight (adoptive sister); Nova Prime (surrogate mother; What If...?)
- Significant other: Star-Lord T'Challa (What If...? Season 1)
- Home: Knowhere
- Status: Original: Alive; Alternate: Deceased

Nebula is a fictional character in the Marvel Cinematic Universe (MCU) media franchise, portrayed by Karen Gillan, based on the Marvel Comics character of the same name. She is depicted as a blue-skinned alien warrior who is both the adoptive daughter of Thanos, who killed her blood family before raising her, and the adoptive sister of Gamora, with whom she grew to share a bitter rivalry.

The character was met with positive reception, specifically for Gillan's performance and redemptive story arc; she has been noted for her differences from the comics, in which Nebula is almost exclusively depicted as a villain.

Although she is first introduced as the secondary antagonist of Guardians of the Galaxy (2014), subsequent films see her develop into an antihero and eventually a protagonist, who joins her sister as part of the Guardians of the Galaxy and becomes a member of the Avengers (during the 5 year blip) and then officially of the Guardians of the Galaxy again. Aspects of this interpretation were later integrated into the comics version of the character.

As of 2024, Nebula has appeared in six films and The Guardians of the Galaxy Holiday Special (2022), with alternate variants of the characters from alternate timelines also appearing in the film Avengers: Endgame (2019) and the animated series What If...? (2021–2024), in particular one who becomes Super Nova in the second season. Guardians of the Galaxy Vol. 3 (2023) was Gillan's final appearance as the character.

== Fictional character biography ==
=== Early life ===
Nebula is one of several children forcibly adopted by Thanos. After he killed her family, she was raised alongside Gamora and trained to be a warrior. Thanos often forced them to fight and Gamora was always victorious. After every loss, Thanos would have a piece of Nebula replaced with a cybernetic part, transforming her into a cyborg.

=== Pursuing Thanos and Gamora ===
In 2014, Nebula and Gamora, under orders from Thanos, were dispatched to assist Ronan the Accuser in obtaining the Power Stone. After learning Gamora had it, Nebula went to Knowhere and shot her pod down and took the Stone for Ronan, who then betrayed Thanos, intending to destroy the planet Xandar and kill Thanos. Nebula sided with him against her father. However, she confronted Gamora, Peter Quill, Groot, and Drax the Destroyer after they infiltrated Ronan's ship. She then fought against Gamora, before falling off and escaping in another ship.

A few months later, Nebula was captured by members of the Sovereign race as she tried to steal their powerful batteries; the Sovereign gave her over to Gamora, Quill, Drax, Groot, and Rocket in exchange for their services defending the batteries. When Quill, Gamora, and Drax leave with Quill's father, Ego, Nebula helps the Ravagers capture Yondu Udonta, Rocket, and Groot. She was given a ship by Kraglin Obfonteri, and went to the planet herself to fight Gamora. After finally defeating Gamora in combat, Nebula expressed anger at her for always needing to be better than her instead of just being a loving sister. She and Gamora reconciled and discovered a cavern of corpses. They located Drax and Mantis, where Gamora confronted Mantis after they found a cavern filled with skeletal remains. They then left to find Quill, before being aided by the arrival of Yondu, Rocket, and Groot. After being pursued by a Sovereign fleet, Nebula helped Yondu take them down. She and the others were then attacked by Ego, and she rescued Gamora from falling, before the living planet was ultimately destroyed from an explosive. She and the others then left in the Quadrant piloted by Obfonteri. Following Yondu's funeral, Nebula was offered to join the Guardians of the Galaxy by Gamora, but she instead resolved to kill Thanos, and left with this mission in mind.

=== Allying with the Avengers ===
Nebula's attempt to kill Thanos fails, and she is instead captured and tortured on the Sanctuary II. In 2018, Nebula is used by Thanos, who had captured Gamora, to convince Gamora to reveal the location of the Soul Stone. After Thanos leaves with Gamora, Nebula escapes and takes a ship to Titan, where she again attempts to kill Thanos, and meets with Quill, Drax, Mantis, Tony Stark, Peter Parker, and Stephen Strange. Nebula survives the Blip and is left on Titan with Stark.

Nebula and Stark leave Titan in the Benatar, but the ship, having been damaged, gets stranded in space, until Carol Danvers appears to save them. After arriving at the Avengers Compound on Earth, Nebula reunites with Rocket, and accompanies him, Danvers, Thor, Steve Rogers, Natasha Romanoff, Bruce Banner, and James Rhodes into space to the Garden to confront Thanos, who is killed by Thor after revealing that the Stones were destroyed.

Nebula and Rocket, now members of the Avengers, work with Danvers on missions in space. In 2023, Nebula and the other Avengers time travel via the Quantum Realm to an alternate 2014. Nebula goes with Clint Barton, Romanoff, and Rhodes to the planet Morag. After Barton and Romanoff leave, Nebula and Rhodes render an alternate version of Quill unconscious and take the Power Stone from the Temple Vault. However, Nebula begins to malfunction due to an alternate version of herself being present in that timeline. An alternate Thanos thereby becomes aware of the presence of Nebula and has her captured. After analyzing her memories and learning about his future victory and the Avengers' efforts to undo it, alternate Thanos sends alternate Nebula to take Nebula's place. Alternate Nebula then brings alternate Thanos and his army to the main timeline, where he destroys the Compound and orders alternate Nebula to bring him the Infinity Stones. Nebula convinces alternate Gamora to help her escape and they locate alternate Nebula, finding her and Barton in the Compound's tunnels. Nebula tries to convince her alternate self to abandon alternate Thanos, but is forced to kill her when the latter attempts to kill alternate Gamora in refusal. Nebula then joins the battle against alternate Thanos' army, and it ends when Stark sacrifices himself by using the Stones to snap alternate Thanos and his army away. A week later, Nebula attends Stark's funeral at his cabin. She then officially joins the restored Guardians, while picking up Thor from Norway.

=== Further adventures ===
Throughout 2024, Nebula and the Guardians go on several adventures, as well as helping Thor lose weight. In 2025, after listening to Thor's suggestion, they travel to Indigarr for vacation, but learn that it is under attack by the Booskans. Unable to defeat them, Thor defeats the army for them. Afterwards, they learn about various distress calls brought about by a god butcher. Thor suggests that they split up to answer the calls.

Few months later, Nebula and the Guardians buy Knowhere from the Collector, as well as gaining a new member, Cosmo. Nebula then helps the team to refurbish it following the attack it had endured. For Christmas that year, she returns to Earth and takes Bucky Barnes's arm and gives it as a gift to Rocket. She then participates in the Christmas celebration that Mantis puts on for Quill.

=== Final mission ===
In 2026, Nebula, aided by Groot, finishes rebuilding Knowhere and the Guardians' headquarters. She and the team then respond to a drunken unconscious Quill and help him. She carries Quill to his apartment and puts him in bed. That night, Nebula fights against Adam Warlock after he attacks to abduct Rocket. After Warlock leaves, Nebula learns Rocket is left gravely injured and requires an override code to disable a killswitch in order to heal him. Nebula contacts alternate Gamora, now a Ravager, to help the Guardians infiltrate the Orgosphere, the headquarters of Rocket's creator, the High Evolutionary, to retrieve the code. After failing to find the code, she and the Guardians travel to Counter-Earth in order to find and confront the High Evolutionary. She goes with Quill and Groot to the vessel, but gets prevented from coming due to her having weapons on her. When the planet begins to explode, she is joined by Drax and Mantis and they enter the vessel thinking Quill and Groot are onboard. They find captive children in cages and she is relieved when she learns Rocket is alive. They get found by the High Evolutionary and are thrown into a chamber with Abilisks, but Mantis calms them down and they use them to escape, meeting up with the team to defeat the High Evolutionary. She uses her cybernetics to pilot his destroyed vessel in order to offload a group of children the High Evolutionary had held captive onto Knowhere. After Quill disbands the Guardians in their current form and makes Rocket leader, she remains on Knowhere to lead the city and help look after the children with Drax.

== Alternate versions ==
Other versions of Nebula are depicted in the alternate realities of the MCU multiverse.

=== 2014 variant ===
An alternate variant of Nebula from before the events of Guardians of the Galaxy appears in Avengers: Endgame. In an alternate 2014, Nebula fights Korbinites on Korbin and is joined by Gamora, who tells her that they are wanted by Thanos, who orders them to assist Ronan in obtaining the Power Stone. Before they can leave, however, Nebula begins to malfunction due to the presence of her prime self from the main 616 timeline. After her prime self is captured, Nebula taunts her for having betrayed her Thanos. She is then ordered to replace her prime self and is sent back to the main timeline to prepare for his arrival. Nebula hacks the Quantum Tunnel and brings Thanos and his army to the main timeline, whereupon he destroys the Avengers Compound and orders Nebula to bring him the Infinity Stones. She finds Clint Barton in the Compound's tunnels and tricks him, taking the Nano-Gauntlet from him. She is then confronted by her prime self and Gamora, who try to convince her to abandon Thanos. However, she refuses and aims her gun at Gamora, and is killed by the prime Nebula.

=== What If...? (2021-2024) ===
Several alternate versions of Nebula appear in the animated series What If...?, with Gillan reprising her role.

- In an alternate 2008, Nebula (marketed as Heist Nebula) is a close ally and love interest of Star-Lord T'Challa. This version does not have cybernetic body parts except for her left eye and is shown to have full-grown blonde hair. She joins with T'Challa, a reformed Thanos, and the Ravagers on a mission to steal the Embers of Genesis from the Collector, and visits Wakanda with them following the mission. She does get annoyed with Thanos' discussion with Okoye.
- In an alternate 2011, Nebula participates in Thor's intergalactic party on Earth, where she is seen gambling in Las Vegas with Korg. Later, when Thor requests the guests to help clean up the mess on Earth, Nebula and the guests dismiss him with Nebula claiming that she thinks she hears her father calling her. The party guests change their minds when they hear that Frigga is coming.
- In an alternate timeline where Ronan overthrew and slayed Thanos, Nebula was found and recruited to the Nova Corps, taking on the career of detective and investigator as Corpsman Nebula, before eventually forming the Guardians of the Galaxy (with Korg, Miek, Groot, and Howard the Duck) as Super Nova. With her new team, Nebula saves Xandar from Ronan and the corrupt Nova Prime Irani Rael who had been Nebula's friend and mentor before her betrayal. Sometime later, Xandar is attacked by the Champion of HYDRA, an inter-dimensional creature and Nebula, -- who is now Nova Prime -- Korg, and Groot stand guard to fight it. They are aided by the arrival of Captain Carter, Kahhori, Brydie the Duck, and Storm who arrive from other universes. After Carter kills the creature, Nebula thanks her before seeing Observational Plane shards fall out of the sky promoting the universe-displaced women to investigate.
- In an alternate 1602, Nebula owned an observatory. However, she was killed by a tear in the universe due to the incursion.

== Concept and creation ==
The comic book version of Nebula was created by writer Roger Stern and artist John Buscema, and first appeared in The Avengers #257 (July 1985).

Marvel Studios President Kevin Feige first mentioned Guardians of the Galaxy as a potential film at the 2010 San Diego Comic-Con, stating, "There are some obscure titles, too, like Guardians of the Galaxy. I think they've been revamped recently in a fun way in the [comic] book." Feige reiterated that sentiment in a September 2011 issue of Entertainment Weekly, saying, "There's an opportunity to do a big space epic, which Thor sort of hints at, in the cosmic side" of the Marvel Cinematic Universe. Feige added, should the film be made, it would feature an ensemble of characters, similar to X-Men and The Avengers. Feige announced that the film was in active development at the 2012 San Diego Comic-Con during the Marvel Studios panel, with an intended release date of August 1, 2014. He said the film's titular team would consist of the characters Star-Lord, Drax the Destroyer, Gamora, Groot, and Rocket. In July 2013, director James Gunn and the film's cast flew from London to attend San Diego Comic-Con, where it was revealed that Karen Gillan would play Nebula. Gillan had previously auditioned for Sharon Carter in Captain America: The Winter Soldier when invited to read for the role, with Gunn declaring her test was the favorite out of the film's cast, which he described as seeing her develop "this bald cyber-jerk" out of a "pretty simple character".

== Characterization ==
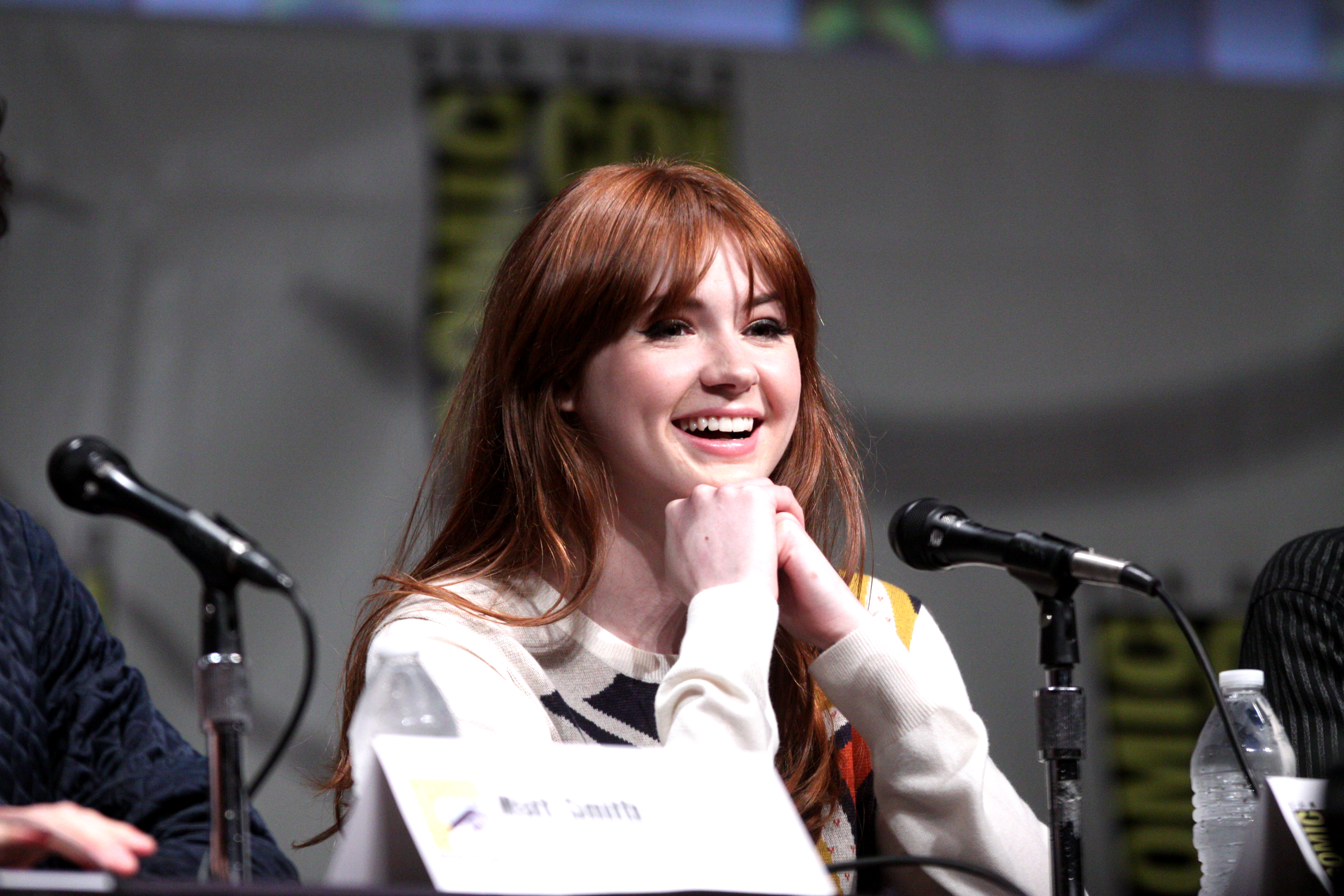
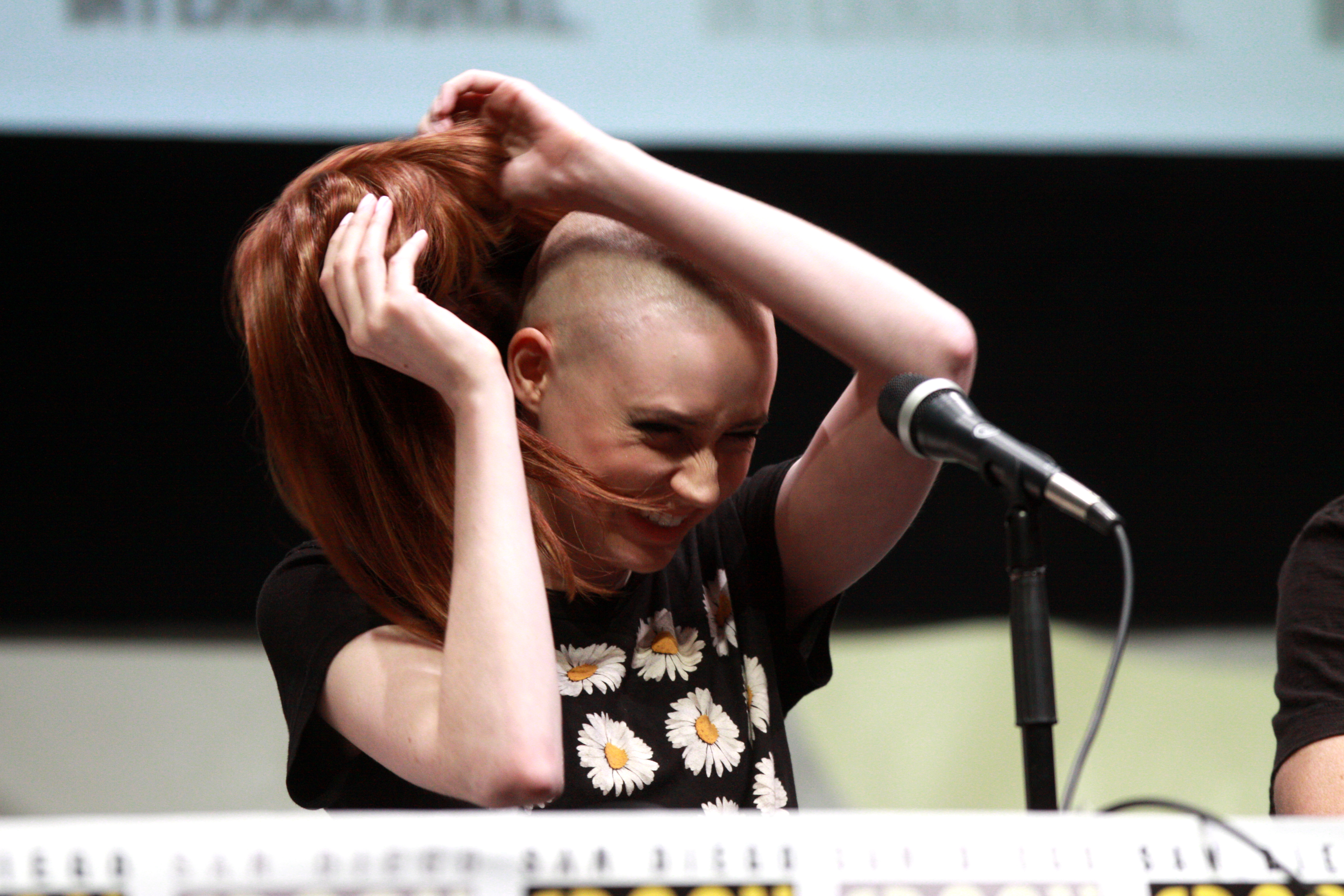
Karen Gillan as she commonly appears in 2012 with hair in a panel for her role as Amy Pond, (left) and Gillan in 2013 revealing a shaved head by removing her wig (right). She had to shave her entire head for Guardians of the Galaxy, but only had to shave half for the first sequel.

In her debut in Guardians of the Galaxy, Nebula is depicted as a loyal lieutenant in the employ of Ronan and Thanos. About the character, Gillan said, "She is the female villain of the film ... She is very sadistic and evil, but I like to think for a very valid reason." She also added, "I think she's a really interesting character. What I like to play around with is how jealous she is. She's Gamora's sister, and there's a lot of sibling rivalry. That's the most interesting aspect to me, because jealousy can consume you and turn you bitter, and ugly. And she's a total sadist, so that's fun too." Gillan researched the ancient Spartans, shaved off her hair, and trained for two months for the role. The character's makeup took approximately four-and-a-half hours to be applied. On the first day of filming, as Gillan and Gunn discussed on how to portray the character, Gunn suggested an impression of Marilyn Monroe, particularly in her breathy delivery which he considered "a similar voice to Clint Eastwood."

I think a lot of the reason that Nebula is the way she is because of James Gunn. He's the sort of creator of her and I think he really connected with the character personally. I remember when we would do scenes between me and Gamora, he'd be like crying in the rehearsals and stuff. He's so invested. So [her character development is] largely down to him, I would say.

— Karen Gillan on Guardians of the Galaxy director James Gunn's impact on Nebula's characterization

In early drafts of the film, the character was planned to be killed off by Gamora, but the directors decided to bring her back in the sequel to further explore the relationship between the two. In Guardians of the Galaxy Vol. 2, Nebula is portrayed as a reluctant member of the Guardians. Gillan stated the film would further explore the sisterly relationship between Nebula and Gamora, including their backstory "and what happened to these two girls growing up and actually how awful it was for them and how it has ruined their relationship", adding "we're [also] going to start to see how much pain [Thanos] actually caused [Nebula]... we really start to see the emotional crack in her character". While Gillan had to shave her head for the first film, she only had to shave half of her head for the sequel, taking away the underneath part and leaving the top. Gillan's makeup took two and a half hours to apply, down from five hours for the first film.

In Avengers: Endgame, after being previously featured as an antagonist or an anti-hero, Nebula undergoes a redemption arc where she makes amends for her past actions, including an encounter with a past version of herself, with Gillan adding that she is "staring her former self in the face and it's really clear how far she's come from that angry, bitter and twisted person. She's starting to connect with other people and find some level of forgiveness." Gillan guessed that Nebula would play a prominent role in the film when she realized that Infinity War and Endgame would be adapted from The Infinity Gauntlet, which she had previously read when she was initially cast as Nebula in Guardians of the Galaxy (2014). Gillan shared several scenes with Robert Downey Jr., who portrays Tony Stark, in the film's opening, and the two improvised most of their scenes together.

Nebula in the Marvel Cinematic Universe ultimately evolves from a villain to a true hero and a member of the Guardians of the Galaxy, while the character in Marvel Comics is depicted almost exclusively as a villain. Another change in the film adaptation from the source material is the character's physical appearance, with the character's MCU depiction eschewing Nebula's initial depiction as an organic humanoid with curled hair to focus on her later one as a bald cyborg. She is not revealed to be related to Gamora in the comics and claimed to be the "granddaughter" of Thanos, which he denies. She also has ambitious villainous goals throughout various publications. Later comic interpretations of Nebula, such as a 2020 eponymous miniseries, would change her look to appear closer to the Marvel Cinematic Universe interpretation.

In July 2021, Gillan said that for her appearance in Thor: Love and Thunder, director Taika Waititi brought out the "bonkers side" of Nebula through her "pure aggression". In September 2021, Gunn noted that for both Pom Klementieff's Mantis and Gillan's Nebula "their roles are both pretty huge" in the script for Guardians of the Galaxy Vol. 3.

== Reception ==
Jacob Stolworthy of The Independent felt that the character had "all the makings of being a vintage Marvel character", but was "slightly short-changed". Miles Surrey of The Ringer, meanwhile, praised the character, saying that "Nebula's internal conflict is one of the most fascinating and compelling threads the MCU has spun over its 20-plus installments" and that the character was "starkly different from virtually everybody in the MCU" as a villain-turned-hero. Richard Newby of The Hollywood Reporter also praised the character's depiction, describing her as "one of the most meaningful considerations of what it means to be both Avenger and human", opining that her story is "one [of] the Marvel Cinematic Universe's best and most empowering myths".

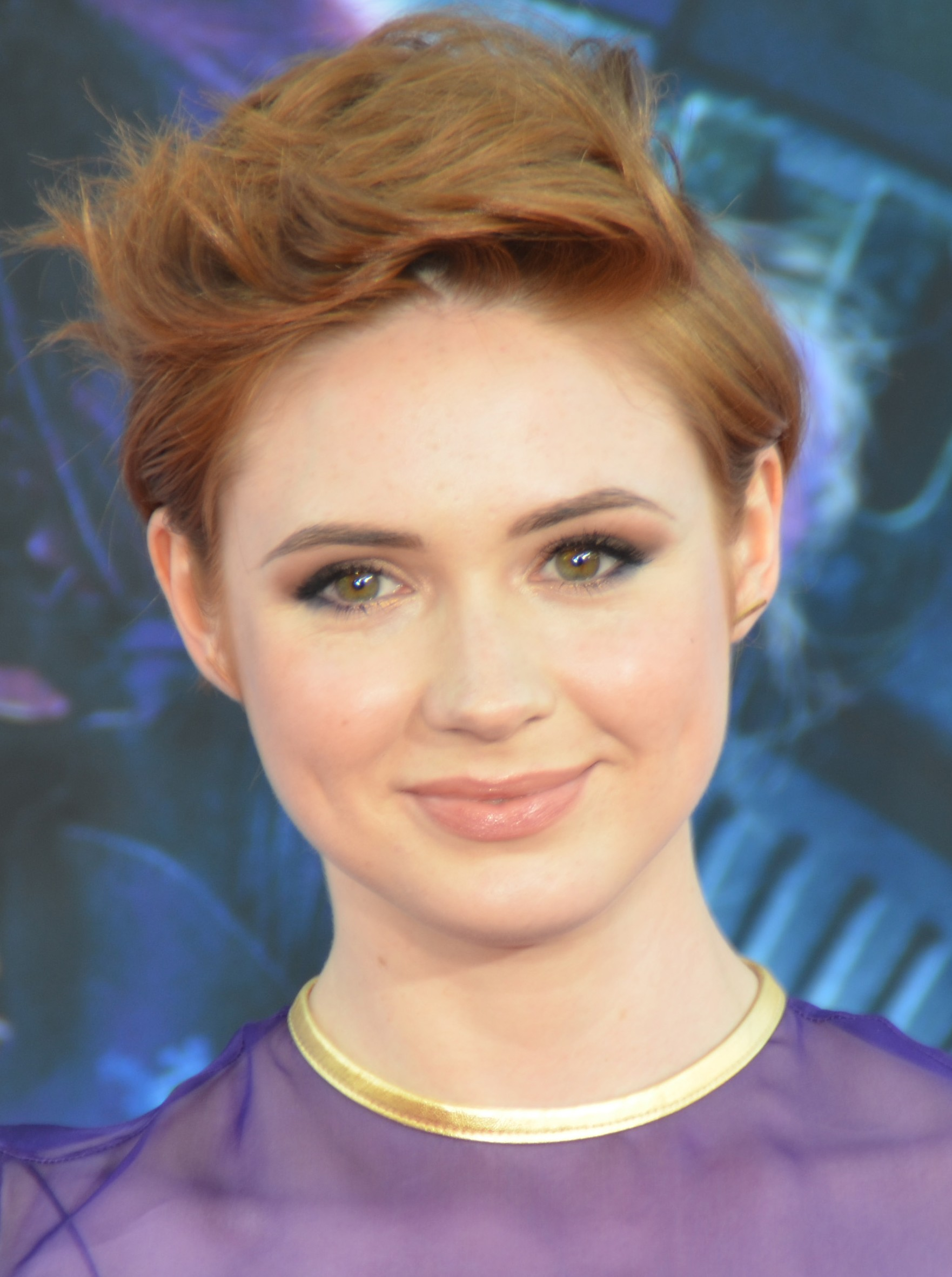
Gillan at the Guardians of the Galaxy premiere in July 2014

=== Awards and nominations ===
Year	Association	Category	Work	Result	Ref.
2014	Detroit Film Critics Society	Best Ensemble	Guardians of the Galaxy	Won	
2014	Nevada Film Critics Society	Best Ensemble Cast	Guardians of the Galaxy	Won	
2014	Phoenix Film Critics Society	Best Cast	Guardians of the Galaxy	Won	
2015	Central Ohio Film Critics Association	Best Ensemble	Guardians of the Galaxy	Won	
2015	Empire Awards	Best Female Newcomer	Guardians of the Galaxy	Won	
2019	Saturn Awards	Best Supporting Actress	Avengers: Endgame	Nominated	

== See also ==
- Characters of the Marvel Cinematic Universe
