= Groot (Marvel Cinematic Universe) =

Extraterrestrial tree creature in the Marvel Cinematic Universe

- Marvel Cinematic Universe character
- Forms of Groot as depicted in Guardians of the Galaxy (2014) (L) and Guardians of the Galaxy Vol. 2 (2017) (R)
- First appearance: Guardians of the Galaxy (2014)
- Based on: Groot by: Stan Lee; Larry Lieber; Jack Kirby
- Adapted by: James Gunn; Nicole Perlman
- Voiced by: Vin Diesel; Fred Tatasciore (What If...? and Marvel Zombies)
- Motion capture by: Vin Diesel; Krystian Godlewski; Sean Gunn; James Gunn; Terry Notary

In-universe information
- Nicknames: Tree; Twig
- Species: Flora colossus
- Gender: Male
- Occupation: Bounty hunter/Mercenary
- Affiliation: Guardians of the Galaxy
- Fighting style: Hand-to-hand combat with superhuman physiology and growing vines
- Weapon: Various alien firearms
- Family: Rocket (adoptive father of second incarnation)

Groot is a fictional character voiced by Vin Diesel and portrayed in various forms and capacities via motion capture by Diesel, Krystian Godlewski, Sean Gunn, James Gunn and Terry Notary, in the Marvel Cinematic Universe (MCU) media franchise, based on the Marvel Comics character of the same name. A tree-like extraterrestrial humanoid known as a flora colossus, the character is a member of the Guardians of the Galaxy and a close associate of Rocket in particular. The initial incarnation of the character sacrifices himself to save his allies during the battle against Ronan the Accuser at the climax of the first film, leaving behind a sapling which grows into a new Groot, colloquially known as "Baby Groot" and differentiated offscreen by James Gunn as the original's "son". Raised by Rocket as an adoptive son, the new Groot gradually grows to a similar size as his predecessor over the course of his next several appearances. He participates in the conflicts against Ego and then Thanos, falling victim to the Blip before being resurrected five years later by the Avengers and participating in the final battle against Thanos before departing for space with the Guardians. After the Guardians defeat the High Evolutionary, Groot continues to serve on the team, now under the command of Rocket.

The character's name is derived from either or both of two words: the Dutch groot, meaning big or great in size, or the noun groot, meaning mud, soil or earth. The origin of the noun, which is now obsolete except in dialect, was Old English.

As of 2024, Groot has appeared in six films, the television special The Guardians of the Galaxy Holiday Special, and the animated series of shorts called I Am Groot released on Disney+.

== Fictional character biography ==
=== Groot ===
==== Rocket and Joining the Guardians ====
A sentient tree-like humanoid, Groot becomes associated with Rocket Racoon. In 2014, on the planet Xandar, they spot Peter Quill fighting Gamora for possession of the Power Stone. Rocket and Groot interfere in their fight, as they attempt to capture Quill for a bounty. All four are captured by the Nova Corps and sent to the Kyln, a space prison. Rocket devises an intricate plan to escape from the Kyln, which involves a battery taken from a device from high up on the wall as the last step due to its connection to an alarm. However, Groot, innocently meaning to help, extends himself to a great height and takes the device, triggering alarms and forcing the rest to accelerate the plan. They escape along with Kyln inmate Drax, and the five become the Guardians of the Galaxy. They travel to Knowhere to sell the Power Stone, where Rocket and Drax have a heated argument resulting in a bar fight between Drax and Groot. After Drax drunkenly calls his powerful enemy Ronan to confront him, Ronan arrives and easily beats Drax and acquires the Power Stone, tossing Drax into a vat of spinal fluid from the mining operations on Knowhere. Groot rescues Drax from drowning, and while Rocket wants to flee, he is convinced by Groot and by Drax's apology to help save Xandar from Ronan's attack.

As Groot and the Guardians battle Ronan the Accuser aboard the Dark Aster, Rocket crashes a Ravager ship through the control room of the Dark Aster, causing it to crash-land on Xandar. Before impact, Groot sacrifices himself to shield Rocket and the others by extending his body to form a cocoon, taking the brunt of the impact. On Xandar, the remaining Guardians are able to regain control of the Power Stone and destroy Ronan.

=== Groot II ===
==== The Ravagers, Sovereigns and Ego ====
Shortly after the Battle of Xandar, Rocket plants a sapling taken from Groot's scattered body, which grows into a new, baby Groot who quickly develops a love of music and dancing. Two months later, the Guardians of the Galaxy are hired by the Sovereign to protect valuable batteries from an inter-dimensional monster. Groot accompanies them, but rather than fighting the monster, he picks fights with rat-like reptiles in the area. When Quill's father Ego reveals himself to the Guardians, they split up so that Quill, Gamora, and Drax can go with Ego to his planet while Rocket and Groot stay behind to watch Nebula and repair the ship. However, the Ravagers arrive searching for Quill and after a fight, they capture Rocket and Groot and free Nebula. The Ravagers mutiny against their leader, Yondu, and mistreat Groot. After the Ravagers fall asleep, Rocket and Yondu plot their escape, and Groot tries to find Yondu's fin. Eventually, Groot kills the Ravager who had tormented him and they destroy most of the Ravager vessel except for a breakaway quarter, in which they travel to Ego's planet. They learn that Ego is an evil living planet intent on dominating the universe. Quill keeps Ego occupied in combat with his newfound Celestial powers until Rocket is able to assemble a bomb, which Groot places in Ego's brain.

==== Space Adventures ====
Groot encountered the Grunds alien species, who believe he is their hero when Groot farts a leaf. When Groot returns from retrieving additional leaves, he accidentally steps on the Grunds. He also encounters Iwua, a space-shifting alien who impersonates him in a dance off, but Groot kills him via opening the airlock. Sometime later, Groot takes a bath and uses his leaves to form multiple "costumes", and skins a squirrel-bird creature that mocked him. Baby Groot sets out to retrieve tools to paint the Guardians of the Galaxy; which he shows to Rocket, whom he saves from an explosion. When exploring the planet of Terma, Groot took care of a bird like creature when its egg hatched. When he was looking for batteries for his video game. He stumbled upon a bionic nose and add a new perspective of smell, until he later took it off when he smelled his room. When the Guardians land on the ice planet of Falligar. Groot was having fun in the snow and made a snowman with parts of the ship, which went out havoc that Groot needs to shut it down. Later on, Groot noticed an intergalactic ice cream truck passing by the Quadrant and was searching for coins for some ice cream. When he was too late as it passed by, he got on to a pod and rammed into the truck. He got his ice cream, but got into trouble with Nova Corps for destroying the ice cream truck. Then Groot wandered into the temple of Drez-Lar where the prophecy of the Seed of Drez-Lar lies and for Groot to fulfill it to save the universe while he unnoticed being watch by the Watcher. But Groot messed it up by burning the seed into the lave as the temple collapses with him in it, but he survived the fallen temple and moves on in the ship as he's waving goodbye to the Watcher, which surprised him.

==== The Blip ====
An older 'teenage Groot' in Avengers: Infinity War (2018)

In 2018, an older, video game-addicted teenage Groot and the rest of the Guardians respond to a distress signal and end up rescuing Thor, who is floating in space amidst the wreckage of the Statesman. Thor tells them of Thanos' plan to obtain the Infinity Stones, and the Guardians split up, with Rocket and Groot accompanying Thor to Nidavellir to create a new weapon. They find an abandoned Nidavellir and meet the dwarf king Eitri. The four work together to create Stormbreaker, a powerful axe that also grants Thor the power of the Bifröst. Thor is near death from the strain of creating the weapon, and Groot uses his own arm as a handle to finish the axe and heal Thor. Thor transports himself, Rocket, and Groot to Wakanda on Earth via the Bifröst to help the Avengers and the Wakandan army in the battle against the Outriders. During the battle, Groot is introduced by Thor to Steve Rogers. Groot joins the Avengers in the forest to protect Vision and tries to stop Thanos after he arrives. However, Thanos is able to activate the Infinity Gauntlet and snap his fingers. Groot is a victim of the Blip and dissolves into dust alongside half of all living things in the universe. Groot uttered one final "I am Groot," which director James Gunn revealed translated to "...Dad?" as he looked to Rocket for help.

In 2023, Groot is restored to life and is brought via portal by the Masters of the Mystic Arts to the destroyed Avengers Compound to join the battle against an alternate Thanos and his army. A week later, Groot and the reunited Guardians attends Tony Stark's funeral. Afterwards, he and the team pick Thor up from Norway and return to space.

==== Further Adventures ====
Groot and the Guardians returned to their adventures in space. In 2025, on Indigarr, the team learns of distress calls as gods were being killed, and they split off from Thor to answer various distress calls across the galaxy.

Few months later, the Guardians buy Knowhere and are joined by Cosmo the Spacedog. Groot, now bulky and bigger, helps rebuild it following the attack it had faced. Later that year, he takes part in Mantis' Christmas celebrations for Quill. Rocket and Cosmo dress him up to mirror a Christmas tree but he lowers his arms frustrating them.

==== Saving Rocket and forming the new Guardians ====
In 2026, after Knowhere is rebuilt, Groot carries a drunken Quill to bed. He then fights Adam Warlock after he attacks them to retrieve Rocket. After Rocket is injured, he joins the team in their new ship to find resources to save Rocket. Their ship gets stopped by Ravagers and an alternate Gamora joins them taking them to Orgocorp. He stays with Rocket on the ship before being tasked with picking the team up. They then travel to Counter Earth and alongside Quill, confronts the High Evolutionary, before engaging in a fight with his men. He and Quill escape and are picked up by Gamora, where he witness Rocket flatline, before he is resuscitated by Quill. They then reunite with Nebula, Mantis, and Drax and help release the High Evolutionary's captives. The team go back into the ship and help Rocket defeat the High Evolutionary before escaping to Knowhere. Quill calls for a meeting and gives Rocket the title of Captain, while most of the team leaves. Before Quill and Mantis depart, Groot says "I love you guys", making this the first time the audience understands him.

Groot stays on the team with Rocket, Cosmo, and Obfonteri, while being joined by Warlock and Phylla. He grows even more, becoming massive, and accompanies the team to Kyrlor.

== Alternate Versions ==
Alternate versions of Groot appear in What If...?, voiced by Fred Tatasciore.

=== Super Nova Nebula ===
In an alternate universe, Groot works at Howard the Duck's casino on Xandar. He joins Howard, Korg, and Miek to assist Corpsman Nebula in preventing an invasion and taking down corrupt Nova Corps leaders.

=== Killed By Incursion ===
In an alternate 1602, Groot owned a winery called Groot Groves and Thor was a customer. However, he was killed by tear in the universe due to the incursion.

=== Zombie Apocalypse ===
In an alternate 2018, Groot accompanied Rocket and Thor in battling against Thanos, who was caught up by the zombie infection. Groot and Rocket were subsequently vaporized by Thanos.

== Conception and creation ==
Groot first appeared in Tales to Astonish #13 (November 1960), and was created by Stan Lee, Larry Lieber and Jack Kirby. "Groot" is the Dutch word for "large", possibly referring to his stature and ability to grow in size. He appeared again in The Incredible Hulk Annual #5 (Oct. 1976), alongside five other monsters from Marvel's anthology horror comics of the late 1950s and early 1960s. In The Sensational Spider-Man #−1 (July 1997), Groot was featured in a nightmare of the young Peter Parker. Groot reappeared in 2006 in the six-issue limited series Nick Fury's Howling Commandos, and appeared in the Annihilation: Conquest and Annihilation: Conquest – Star-Lord limited series. Groot went on to join the Guardians of the Galaxy in the series of the same name, and remained a fixture of the title until its cancellation with issue #25 in 2010.

Marvel Studios President Kevin Feige first mentioned Guardians of the Galaxy as a potential film at the 2010 San Diego Comic-Con, stating, "There are some obscure titles, too, like Guardians of the Galaxy. I think they've been revamped recently in a fun way in the [comic] book." Feige reiterated that sentiment in a September 2011 issue of Entertainment Weekly, saying, "There's an opportunity to do a big space epic, which Thor sort of hints at, in the cosmic side" of the Marvel Cinematic Universe. Feige added, should the film be made, it would feature an ensemble of characters, similar to X-Men and The Avengers. Feige announced that the film was in active development at the 2012 San Diego Comic-Con during the Marvel Studios panel, with an intended release date of August 1, 2014. He said the film's titular team would consist of the characters Star-Lord, Drax the Destroyer, Gamora, Groot, and Rocket.

In September 2013, Vin Diesel stated that he was voicing Groot, though Marvel did not confirm Diesel's involvement in the film at the time.

== Characterization ==
Groot is first introduced as Rocket's partner appearing in the film Guardians of the Galaxy. He has a limited vocabulary, using only his popular catchphrase "I am Groot", although he later managed to say the phrase "We are Groot" before sacrificing his life for the Guardians of the Galaxy in the battle with Ronan for an infinity stone. Other Groot characteristics include the ability to grow his branches in height, length, and girth (assimilating arms and legs), vining branches, growing flowers and producing a form of luminescent seeds.

A tree-like humanoid, he is the accomplice of Rocket. Diesel stated that he provided the voice and motion capture for Groot, after originally being in talks to star in a new Phase Three Marvel film. Diesel also provided Groot's voice for several foreign-language releases of the film. Krystian Godlewski portrayed the character on set, though his acting was not used in the final character CGI. On the character, which Gunn based on his dog, Gunn said, "All the Guardians start out the movie as bastards—except Groot. He's an innocent. He's a hundred percent deadly and a hundred percent sweet. He's caught up in Rocket's life, really." Gunn added that the design and movement of Groot took "the better part of a year" to create. Gunn added, "The ways in which Vin Diesel says, 'I am Groot,' I am astounded. All of the 'I am Groots' that were earlier voices didn't sound very good at all ... Vin came in and in one day, laid down all these 'I am Groot' tracks, and he's a perfectionist. He made me explain to him with ever [sic] 'I am Groot,' exactly what he was saying ... It was amazing when we first put that voice in there how much the character changed and how much he influenced the character." Regarding the limited words used by Groot, Diesel said in many ways this was, "... the most challenging thing to ask an actor to do." Diesel found an emotional note in his performance, invoking the death of his friend and Fast & Furious co-star Paul Walker, saying, "This was in December [2013], and the first time I came back to dealing with human beings after dealing with death, so playing a character who celebrates life in the way Groot does was very nice." Groot's form and size-changing abilities are seen, with Gunn stating that he has the ability to grow in the film.

The mature Groot appears to be nearly indestructible, as seen when his limbs are chopped off and by his ability to thicken his branches into a protective mass that's impenetrable by bullets. He serves as a friend, shield and protector of Rocket and his fellow Guardian friends.

The reborn incarnation of the character exhibits some different qualities, particularly in his very young stages. First seen as a sapling at the end of the first film, with James Gunn initially intended for him to be fully grown by the sequel, but eventually decided to keep him as "Baby Groot", which was one of the reasons the film is set only a few months after the first. Gunn described Baby Groot as the son of Groot from the first film, with Diesel explaining that "we're going to see this goofy, adorable, baby Groot [just] kinda learning as he goes." Prop master Russell Bobbitt created a 1:1 scale model of the 10-inch (25 cm) Baby Groot for filming, to use as a lighting reference and sometimes as a puppet for the actors to interact with. As Groot only communicates with the phrase "I am Groot" in different inflections, Gunn created a "Groot Version" of the script for himself and Diesel, which contains each of Groot's lines in English. Diesel used a higher register of his voice for Baby Groot, which was pitched up by seven to nine semitones depending on the take. He also delivered lines slowly to avoid any time stretching issues. Diesel recorded Groot's voice for sixteen foreign-language releases of the film (up from six in the first film). Sean Gunn provided on-set reference for adolescent Groot in the post-credit sequence.

== In other media ==
=== Film ===
Vin Diesel reprises his role as Baby Groot in Walt Disney Animation Studios' 2018 film Ralph Breaks the Internet. He is seen in the Oh My Disney world of the Internet answering questions from fans, with every answer being "I am Groot".

=== Theme parks ===
Baby Groot appears in Guardians of the Galaxy – Mission: Breakout! at Disney California Adventure, while the mature Groot appears in Guardians of the Galaxy: Cosmic Rewind at Epcot. For these appearances the character is voiced by Fred Tatasciore.

== Reception ==
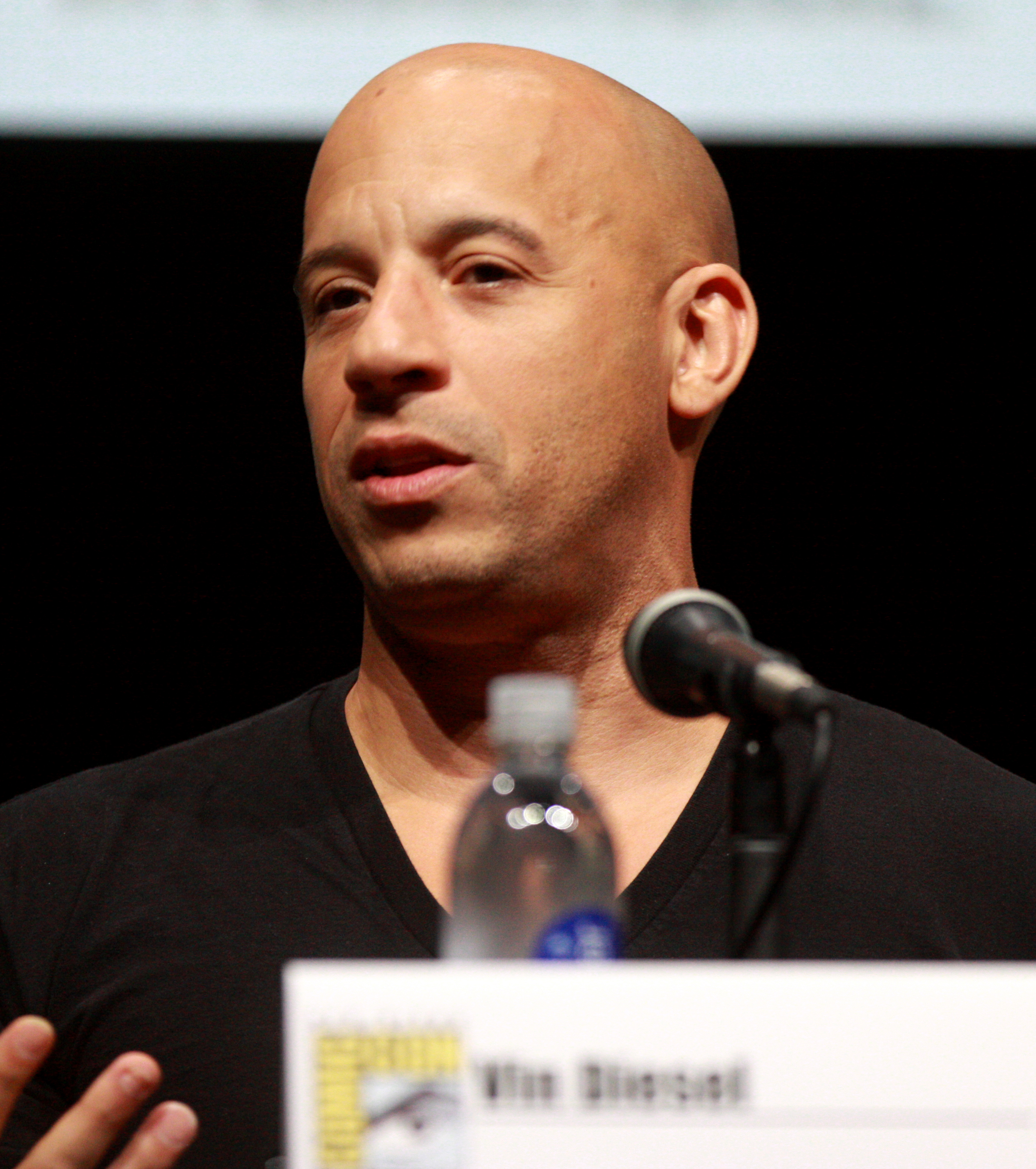
Diesel at the 2013 San Diego Comic-Con

Jacob Stolworthy of The Independent praised the character, opining that Groot was "one of the best things about the first Guardians of the Galaxy film, and his camaraderie with Rocket Raccoon [was] a highlight". However, Stolworthy also criticized the subsequent depiction of the character as a baby as "extremely annoying". Peter Bradshaw of The Guardian, meanwhile, praised the character, likening Groot to "a huge Tolkienian creature".

Following the premiere of Guardians of the Galaxy, Vin Diesel and Bradley Cooper, who voices Rocket, were nominated in the "Best Duo" category at the 2015 MTV Movie Awards, Vin Diesel was nominated for Best Voice Performance at the 2015 Black Reel Awards for the first film, later he won the award at the 2018 Black Reel Awards for the second film. The character has also been the subject of numerous memes on social media. Media outlets expressed excitement at seeing the bigger, bulkier Groot who appeared in The Guardians of the Galaxy Holiday Special.
