= Gamora (Marvel Cinematic Universe) =

Character in the Marvel Cinematic Universe

- Marvel Cinematic Universe character
- Zoe Saldaña as Gamora in Avengers: Infinity War (2018)
- First appearance: Original: Guardians of the Galaxy (2014); Alternate: Avengers: Endgame (2019)
- Last appearance: Original: Avengers: Infinity War (2018); Alternate: Guardians of the Galaxy Vol. 3 (2023)
- Based on: Gamora by Jim Starlin
- Adapted by: James Gunn; Nicole Perlman
- Portrayed by: Zoe Saldaña; Ariana Greenblatt (young)
- Voiced by: Cynthia McWilliams (What If...?)

In-universe information
- Full name: Gamora Zen Whoberi Ben Titan
- Species: Zehoberei
- Title: The Deadliest Woman in the Galaxy
- Occupation: Assassin; Mercenary; Smuggler (Note: Alternative timeline self)
- Affiliation: Guardians of the Galaxy; Children of Thanos; Ravagers (Note: Alternate timeline version)
- Fighting style: Swordsmanship with superhuman physiology
- Weapon: Godslayer sword; Bejeweled knife; Various firearms and bladed weapons
- Family: Thanos (adoptive father); Nebula (adoptive sister); Corvus Glaive (adoptive brother); Cull Obsidian (adoptive brother); Ebony Maw (adoptive brother); Proxima Midnight (adoptive sister)
- Significant other: Peter Quill (Note: Original timeline version)

Gamora Zen Whoberi Ben Titan is a fictional character portrayed primarily by Zoe Saldaña in the Marvel Cinematic Universe (MCU) media franchise, based on the Marvel Comics character of the same name. Gamora is depicted as a member of the Guardians of the Galaxy, having escaped her previous life as an assassin after she was forcibly adopted by Thanos after he murdered half of her people, including her mother. For the next twenty years, she served Thanos as a cybernetically enhanced warrior until betraying him to join the Guardians.

Over time she becomes romantically involved with Peter Quill, and develops a positive relationship with her adopted sister Nebula despite their rivalrous upbringing. She is eventually killed by Thanos when he sacrifices her to obtain the Soul Stone in Avengers: Infinity War.

When the Avengers use time travel in an effort to undo Thanos' actions, an alternate 2014-Gamora accompanies 2014-Thanos to confront the Avengers in 2023 after he hijacks their technology. However, she switches sides and joins the fight against her father. She joins the Ravagers and allies with the Guardians of the Galaxy in their fight against the High Evolutionary, while rebuffing Quill's efforts to reboot a relationship between them.

As of 2024, Gamora has appeared in five films in the MCU. The character and Saldaña's portrayal have been met with positive reception. Alternate versions of Gamora from within the MCU multiverse appear in Avengers: Endgame (2019), Guardians of the Galaxy Vol. 3 (2023), and in the animated series What If...? (2021). One version, voiced by Cynthia McWilliams, usurped Thanos's warlord position and is recruited into the Guardians of the Multiverse by the Watcher to help defeat an alternate version of Ultron. Guardians of the Galaxy Vol. 3 (2023) was Saldaña's final appearance as the character.

== Concept and creation ==
Gamora debuted as a comic book character in Strange Tales #180 (1975), and was created by Jim Starlin. She returned in issue #181, Warlock vol. 1 #9, 10, 11 and 15 (1975–1976), and in the 1977 annuals for Avengers and Marvel Two-in-One. In 1990, she returned in Silver Surfer vol. 3 #46–47. She had a minor role in Infinity Gauntlet #1–6 (1991) and co-starred in Warlock and the Infinity Watch #1–42 (1992–1995). She was also featured in the Infinity War (1992) and Infinity Crusade (1993) crossovers. After appearing in Infinity Abyss #1–6 (2002), Annihilation: Ronan #1–4 (2006), Annihilation #1–6 (2006), Annihilation: Conquest #6 (2008) and Nova vol. 4 #4–12 (2007–2008), Gamora costarred in Guardians of the Galaxy vol. 2 #1–25 (2008–2010).

Marvel Studios President Kevin Feige first mentioned Guardians of the Galaxy as a potential film at the 2010 San Diego Comic-Con, stating, "There are some obscure titles, too, like Guardians of the Galaxy. I think they've been revamped recently in a fun way in the [comic] book." Feige reiterated that sentiment in a September 2011 issue of Entertainment Weekly, saying, "There's an opportunity to do a big space epic, which Thor sort of hints at, in the cosmic side" of the Marvel Cinematic Universe. Feige added, should the film be made, it would feature an ensemble of characters, similar to X-Men and The Avengers. Feige announced that the film was in active development at the 2012 San Diego Comic-Con during the Marvel Studios panel, with an intended release date of August 1, 2014. He said the film's titular team would consist of the characters Star-Lord, Gamora, Drax the Destroyer, Groot, and Rocket.

In early April 2013, Zoe Saldaña entered into negotiations to star as Gamora in the film, and it was confirmed she had been cast later that month. Amanda Seyfried had been offered the role, but declined due to the excessive hours of make-up required for the role, and her uncertainty over the film's commercial viability.

== Fictional character biography ==
=== Early life ===
As a child, Gamora's homeworld was invaded by Thanos, whose forces killed half the population, including her parents. Gamora confronted him, and out of admiration for her courage, he adopted her as his daughter. She was trained as an assassin, and raised alongside Nebula, whom she was often pitted against in fights, in which Gamora always won.

=== Joining the Guardians of the Galaxy ===
Gamora plans to rebel against Thanos when he sends her to aid Ronan the Accuser, a Kree fanatic who wants to destroy the planet Xandar. She travels to Xandar to retrieve an Infinity Stone that has been acquired by Peter Quill in order to sell it for enough money to afford to live the rest of her life. Due to the interference of bounty hunters Rocket and Groot, she is instead captured by Xandar's law enforcement, the Nova Corps, and sent to a space prison called the Kyln, along with Quill, Rocket and Groot. There, she is threatened by Drax the Destroyer, whose family was killed by Ronan under the command of Thanos, but Drax spares her life when Quill assures him that her presence will draw Ronan to them. Gamora joins Quill, Rocket, Groot, and Drax in escaping the prison. The group form the Guardians of the Galaxy and travel to Knowhere, where Gamora meets with the Collector. After being attacked by Nebula, Gamora and the Guardians are able to save Xandar from Ronan. Because of her heroic actions, Gamora is cleared of her previous crimes.

=== Stopping Ego ===
Some months later, Gamora and the Guardians are hired by the Sovereign to fight off an alien attacking their valuable batteries, in exchange for a captured Nebula. After they leave, they are chased by the Sovereign's fleet after Rocket reveals that he stole some of the batteries. Crash landing on a planet, they meet Quill's father, Ego. Gamora, Quill, and Drax decide to go with Ego to his planet, while Rocket, Groot, and Nebula stay behind. On Ego's planet, they meet Ego's assistant Mantis, and Gamora and Quill begin a romantic relationship. While exploring the planet, Gamora is attacked by an escaped Nebula. After Gamora saves Nebula from her burning spaceship, the two sisters reconcile. They meet up with the Guardians and find out about Ego's true evil plans. She and Nebula then help each other get to safety while escaping the planet, and once in space, she and Nebula say their goodbyes, after Nebula tells her that she's going after Thanos.

=== Infinity War and death ===
Four years later, Gamora and the Guardians respond to a distress signal in space and end up rescuing Thor from his destroyed spacecraft, thereby learning about Thanos's quest to obtain the Infinity Stones. Gamora grimly tells Quill that she knows something Thanos does not and asks him to kill her if needed. On Knowhere, Gamora, Quill, Mantis, and Drax see Thanos, and Gamora immediately attacks him, seemingly killing him. However, Thanos reveals himself, showing her that Knowhere is destroyed and that he already has the Reality Stone. After a failed attempt to kill her by Quill, Thanos kidnaps her and takes her upon his spaceship. He shows her a captured and tortured Nebula to emotionally manipulate Gamora into revealing the location of the Soul Stone. Thanos and Gamora go to the planet Vormir where they are met by the Red Skull who tells them that to obtain the Soul Stone, one must sacrifice what they love. Thanos admits that he truly loves Gamora as his daughter, and tearfully throws her off the cliff to her death. When Thanos later uses the completed Infinity Gauntlet, he briefly reunites with a younger Gamora inside the Soul World.

== Alternate versions ==
=== 2014 variant ===
==== Leaving her universe and the Battle of Earth ====
In an alternate 2014, Gamora and Nebula engage in a fight against Korbintes on Korbin before being summoned by Thanos, who orders them to assist Ronan in obtaining the Power Stone. Before they can leave, however, Nebula begins to malfunction due to the presence of her main counterpart. After capturing Earth-616 Nebula, Thanos analyzes her memories and learns about his deceased counterpart's victory. Gamora is then brought through the Quantum Realm to the Earth-616 universe and is recruited by the other Nebula to join her side. They find Nebula and Clint Barton in the destroyed Avengers Compound and try to convince her to abandon Thanos. However, she refuses, and is killed by the other Nebula. Gamora then participates in the battle, during which she encounters and rejects Quill. She leaves the battlefield after Thanos and his forces are disintegrated by Tony Stark.

==== Joining the Ravagers and helping the Guardians ====
Gamora then joins the Ravagers. In 2026, she and the Ravagers arrive on the Guardians of the Galaxy's new ship after getting a call from Nebula and she is dispatched to help them infiltrate the High Evolutionary's Orgosphere to retrieve Rocket's file. Barely escaping Orgosphere, the team next visits Counter-Earth against Gamora's advice, who angrily bails out on them after calling out not only the Guardians, as a whole for them constantly making up separate plans because they feel like it, but Quill for his need to make her like her alternate counterpart. The empress of the Sovereign, Ayesha, and her superpowered creation Adam, intercept a communication from Gamora via a Ravager that Adam killed during an interrogation and follow her coordinates to Counter-Earth. As the other Guardians end up on the High Evolutionary's ship, Gamora stays with Rocket, but is attacked by a pig warrior sent by the High Evolutionary, who, herself, is killed when Adam arrives looking for Rocket. Gamora overpowers Warlock and launches the Guardians' ship. Quill and Groot successfully defeat the High Evolutionary's men and capture Orgonian scientist Theel, jumping off with him and retrieving his memory before Gamora rescues them. Gamora then helps Quill to deactivate the kill switch and save Rocket. After a battle in which the High Evolutionary is defeated, she makes amends with Quill, who finally accepts that she is not the Gamora he knows, before returning to the Ravagers.

=== What If...? ===
Several alternate versions of Gamora appear in the animated series What If...?, in which she is voiced by Cynthia McWilliams.

==== Destroyer of Thanos ====
In an alternate 2012, Gamora is sent by Thanos to kill Tony Stark due to his destroying the Chitauri mothership. She locates him on Sakaar, but gets imprisoned by Topaz. Gamora manages to escape, but gets caught again and forced to take part in the Grandmaster's racing tournament. There she is met by Stark, who places a communicator in her car so they can talk. He convinces her to make her own decisions free from her father's control and Gamora saves Stark from two of the Grandmaster's creatures, sacrificing her own chances of winning the race in the process. After Stark wins the race and Grandmaster is reduced to a sentient puddle, Gamora takes Stark to the Sanctuary where she uses Topaz's staff to kill Thanos. (Note: The episode containing this alternate version of Gamora was delayed to the second season due to COVID-19 pandemic-related production issues.)

She and Stark then travel to Nidavellir in order to destroy the Infinity Gauntlet. While there, she is recruited by the Watcher to join the Guardians of the Multiverse to help stop Ultron. The Guardians devise a plan to destroy Ultron's Infinity Stones using the Infinity Crusher, only to discover that the Crusher does not work outside of Gamora's universe. After Ultron is eventually defeated, the Watcher returns Gamora to her universe, where she resumes her travels with Stark.

==== Other universes ====
- In an alternate 2015, Gamora, along with the other Guardians of the Galaxy, is killed while defending the Sovereign from Ultron.
- In an alternate universe, Gamora was killed by Ronan the Accuser alongside Thanos.
- In an alternate universe, a young Gamora meets Thanos during his attack on her planet, but she is rescued by Hela, the armies of Asgard and the Ten Rings.
- In an alternate universe, Gamora wears a wedding dress.

== Characterization ==
Gamora is an orphan from an alien world who seeks redemption for her past crimes. She was trained by Thanos to be his personal assassin. Saldaña said that she became Gamora through make-up rather than computer-generated imagery (CGI) or performance capture. On taking the role, Saldaña said, "I was just excited to be asked to join by James Gunn and to also play someone green. I've been blue before [in Avatar]." Saldaña described Gamora as "a warrior, she's an assassin and she's very lethal, but what saves her is the same thing that can doom her. She has a sense of righteousness. She's a very righteous individual."

She appears as a member of the original Guardians of the Galaxy, eventually finding love with Peter Quill as seen in Guardians of the Galaxy and Guardians of the Galaxy: Vol. 2. Saldaña described Gamora's role in Vol. 2, as the team's "the voice of reason", saying, "She's surrounded by all these dudes who are so stupid half the time," and added that she is the "Mom" of the team, saying that she is "just a meticulous, detailed, professional individual." Regarding Gamora's relationship with Nebula, Saldaña described it as "volatile" and added, "we're starting somewhere very crazy but appropriate given where we had ended things off in the first installment".

In Avengers: Infinity War, Gamora is still in a relationship with Quill. She is captured by Thanos and taken to Vormir where she is killed so Thanos can receive the Soul Stone. Ariana Greenblatt portrays a young Gamora in Infinity War in a flashback, as well as when she is with Thanos in the Soul Stone's "Soul World".

== In other media ==
=== Theme parks ===
Saldaña reprises her role of Gamora for the attractions Guardians of the Galaxy – Mission: Breakout! at Disney California Adventure and Guardians of the Galaxy: Cosmic Rewind at Epcot.

== Reception ==
Zoe Saldaña has received numerous award nominations for her portrayal of the character.

Award	Year	Category	Work	Result	Ref(s)
Black Reel Awards	2015	Best Supporting Actress	Guardians of the Galaxy	Nominated	
Critics' Choice Movie Awards	2015	Best Actress in an Action Movie	Guardians of the Galaxy	Nominated	
MTV Movie Awards	2015	Best On-Screen Transformation	Guardians of the Galaxy	Nominated	
People's Choice Awards	2015	Favorite Action Movie Actress	Guardians of the Galaxy	Nominated	
Teen Choice Awards
Teen Choice Awards	2017	Choice Movie Actress: Sci-Fi	Guardians of the Galaxy Vol. 2	Won	
Teen Choice Awards	2017	Choice MovieShip (shared with Chris Pratt)	Guardians of the Galaxy Vol. 2	Nominated	
Teen Choice Awards	2018	Choice Liplock (shared with Chris Pratt)	Avengers: Infinity War	Nominated	
Teen Choice Awards	2018	Choice Actress: Action	Avengers: Infinity War	Nominated	
Teen Choice Awards	2019	Choice Actress: Action	Avengers: Endgame	Nominated	
Nickelodeon Kids' Choice Awards	2018	Favorite Movie Actress	Guardians of the Galaxy Vol. 2	Nominated	
Nickelodeon Kids' Choice Awards	2019	Favorite Movie Actress	Avengers: Infinity War	Nominated	
Nickelodeon Kids' Choice Awards	2024	Favorite Movie Actress	Guardians of the Galaxy Vol. 3	Nominated	
Critics' Choice Super Awards	2024	Best Actress in a Superhero Movie	Guardians of the Galaxy Vol. 3	Nominated	

== See also ==
- Characters of the Marvel Cinematic Universe
- Gamora
