= Sharon Carter (disambiguation) =

Sharon Carter may refer to:

- Sharon Carter, the Marvel Comics character
- Sharon Carter (Marvel Cinematic Universe), the Marvel Cinematic Universe version
- "Sharon Carter" (Marvel Studios: Legends), an episode of Marvel Studios: Legends
