= What If... Killmonger Rescued Tony Stark? =

- What If...? episode
- Promotional poster
- Episode no.: Season 1 Episode 6
- Directed by: Bryan Andrews
- Written by: Matthew Chauncey
- Editing by: Graham Fisher
- Original release date: September 15, 2021
- Running time: 33 minutes

Cast
- Michael B. Jordan as N'Jadaka / Erik "Killmonger" Stevens; Jon Favreau as Happy Hogan; Chadwick Boseman as T'Challa / Black Panther; Angela Bassett as Ramonda; Danai Gurira as Okoye; Andy Serkis as Ulysses Klaue; Don Cheadle as James "Rhodey" Rhodes; Paul Bettany as J.A.R.V.I.S.; Leslie Bibb as Christine Everhart; John Kani as T'Chaka; Mick Wingert as Tony Stark; Kiff VandenHeuvel as Obadiah Stane; Beth Hoyt as Pepper Potts; Mike McGill as Thaddeus Ross; Ozioma Akagha as Shuri

Episode chronology
← Previous "What If... Zombies?!"	Next → "What If... Thor Were an Only Child?"
- What If...? season 1

"What If... Killmonger Rescued Tony Stark?" is the sixth episode of the first season of the American animated television series What If...?, based on the Marvel Comics series of the same name. It explores what would happen if the events of the Marvel Cinematic Universe (MCU) films Iron Man (2008) and Black Panther (2018) occurred differently, with Erik "Killmonger" Stevens enacting a secret plan to enter Wakanda that involves saving and befriending Tony Stark. The episode was written by story editor Matthew Chauncey and directed by Bryan Andrews.

Jeffrey Wright narrates the series as the Watcher, with this episode also starring the voices of Michael B. Jordan (Killmonger), Jon Favreau, Chadwick Boseman, Angela Bassett, Danai Gurira, Andy Serkis, Don Cheadle, Paul Bettany, John Kani, Leslie Bibb, and Mick Wingert (Stark). The series began development by September 2018, with Andrews joining soon after, and many actors expected to reprise their roles from the MCU films. Animation for the episode was provided by Flying Bark Productions, with Stephan Franck serving as head of animation.

"What If... Killmonger Rescued Tony Stark?" was released on Disney+ on September 15, 2021. Critics praised the focus on Killmonger and noted the episode's portrayal of him as an anime fan, but criticized the abrupt ending.

== Plot ==
In Afghanistan, Tony Stark's military convoy is ambushed by the Ten Rings, but he is saved by Erik "Killmonger" Stevens. (Note: This rescue is when the story diverges from the events of the film Iron Man (2008).) Returning to Stark Industries, Stark hires Killmonger and pledges to build better weapons. Killmonger exposes Obadiah Stane's involvement in the ambush, having infiltrated the Ten Rings, (Note: This action is when the story diverges from the events of the film Black Panther (2018).) and subsequently replaces Stane. Stark offers his expertise to build drone robots designed by Killmonger and succeeds at building one with Killmonger's vibranium ring as a power source.

Needing more vibranium to create a drone army, they arrange for James "Rhodey" Rhodes to buy stolen vibranium from Ulysses Klaue. Klaue leaks word of the transaction to Wakanda, luring in T'Challa / Black Panther, who attacks the meeting to reclaim the vibranium. Killmonger kills T'Challa and Rhodes, making it look like they killed each other. Stark confronts Killmonger and attempts to avenge Rhodes by ordering the drone to kill Killmonger. Still, Killmonger defeats the drone and kills Stark with a Dora Milaje spear, staging it as a Wakandan attack. Shortly after, Killmonger creates an army of drones with the stolen vibranium.

The United States and Wakanda enter a conflict over the deaths of T'Challa, Rhodes, and Stark. The American military, led by General Thaddeus Ross, assumes control of Stark Industries and uses the drone army to invade Wakanda. Meanwhile, Killmonger kills Klaue to prove his allegiance to Wakanda and reunites with Wakanda's rulers and his estranged uncle T'Chaka and aunt Ramonda. Killmonger cuts off Ross' command of the drones, then secretly reactivates their combat capabilities so that he can lead the Wakandan army in defeating them.

After the battle, T'Chaka bestows the Black Panther mantle to Killmonger. In the astral plane, Killmonger meets with T'Challa, who warns him that he will be defeated one day. As the American military plans to eradicate Wakanda, T'Challa's sister Shuri meets with Stark's assistant Pepper Potts, proposing that they expose the truth of Killmonger's deceit.

== Production ==
=== Development ===
External videos
- What If... Killmonger Rescued Tony Stark? | Marvel Studios' What If...? | Disney+, a promotional video introducing the episode's "what if" concept with narration by Jeffrey Wright as the Watcher, video from the What If...? Twitter account

By September 2018, Marvel Studios was developing an animated anthology series based on the What If...? comic books, which would explore how the Marvel Cinematic Universe (MCU) films would be altered if certain events occurred differently. Head writer A. C. Bradley joined the project in October 2018, with director Bryan Andrews meeting Marvel Studios executive Brad Winderbaum about the project as early as 2018; Bradley and Andrews' involvement was announced in August 2019. They executive produce alongside Winderbaum, Kevin Feige, Louis D'Esposito, and Victoria Alonso. Story editor Matthew Chauncey wrote the sixth episode, titled "What If... Killmonger Rescued Tony Stark?", which features an alternate storyline of the films Iron Man (2008) and Black Panther (2018). The episode also recreates moments from the films The Avengers (2012), Avengers: Age of Ultron (2015), and Avengers: Endgame (2019). In the episode's alternate storyline, Erik "Killmonger" Stevens prevents Tony Stark from being abducted by the Ten Rings in Afghanistan as part of a secret plan to enter Wakanda. This version of Killmonger was marketed as "King Killmonger". "What If... Killmonger Rescued Tony Stark?" was released on Disney+ on September 15, 2021.

=== Casting ===
Jeffrey Wright narrates the episode as the Watcher, with Marvel planning to have other characters in the series voiced by the actors who portrayed them in the MCU films. The episode stars returning Black Panther actors Michael B. Jordan as N'Jadaka / Erik "Killmonger" Stevens, Chadwick Boseman as T'Challa / Black Panther, Angela Bassett as Ramonda, Danai Gurira as Okoye, Andy Serkis as Ulysses Klaue, and John Kani as T'Chaka, alongside returning Iron Man actors Jon Favreau as Harold "Happy" Hogan, Paul Bettany as J.A.R.V.I.S., and Leslie Bibb as Christine Everhart. Don Cheadle also reprises his role as James Rhodes, who was played by Terrence Howard in Iron Man; Cheadle was cast in the role for Iron Man 2 (2010) onwards, and the episode integrates Cheadle's portrayal into alternate versions of Iron Man scenes that Howard appeared in.

Mick Wingert and Mike McGill reprise their roles as Tony Stark and Thaddeus Ross, respectively, from the third episode, in which they replaced MCU stars Robert Downey Jr. and William Hurt. Kiff VandenHeuvel voices Obadiah Stane, replacing Jeff Bridges, Beth Hoyt voices Pepper Potts, replacing Gwyneth Paltrow, and Ozioma Akagha voices Shuri, replacing Letitia Wright. Other characters who appear in non-speaking roles include Stark's robot Dum-E, a mercenary working for Klaue who was portrayed by Bentley Kalu in Age of Ultron, and the Avengers—Steve Rogers / Captain America, Bruce Banner / Hulk, Thor, Natasha Romanoff / Black Widow, and Clint Barton / Hawkeye.

=== Animation ===
Animation for the episode was provided by Flying Bark Productions, with Stephan Franck serving as head of animation. Andrews developed the series' cel-shaded animation style with Ryan Meinerding, the head of visual development at Marvel Studios. Though the series has a consistent art style, elements such as the camera and color palette differ between episodes. Concept art for the episode is included during the end credits, and was released online by Marvel following the episode's premiere.

=== Music ===
A soundtrack for the episode was released digitally by Marvel Music and Hollywood Records on September 17, 2021, featuring composer Laura Karpman's score.

What If... Killmonger Rescued Tony Stark? (Original Soundtrack)
No.	Title	Length
1.	"Convoy"	0:53
2.	"Saved"	1:09
3.	"Speech"	1:11
4.	"Bankrolled"	1:02
5.	"Return the Favor"	0:52
6.	"Building Montage"	0:56
7.	"Juice"	0:56
8.	"Salvage Yard Fight"	1:11
9.	"Eyes on This"	1:26
10.	"Uniform"	1:26
11.	"Justice"	1:40
12.	"You Work For Me"	1:36
13.	"War is Here"	1:07
14.	"Drones"	1:21
15.	"Impossible"	2:11
16.	"Loyal Servant"	0:50
17.	"For Chadwick"	1:02
Total length:		20:49

== Marketing ==
After the episode's release, Marvel released a poster for the episode, featuring Killmonger and Stark together with a quote from the episode. Marvel also announced merchandise inspired by the episode as part of its weekly "Marvel Must Haves" promotion for each episode of the series, including apparel, accessories, and Funko Pops based on Killmonger and General Ramonda.

== Reception ==
=== Audience viewership ===
What If...? was the second-most streamed series for viewers in the United States for the week ending September 19, 2021 according to Whip Media's TV Time.

=== Critical response ===
Gavin Jasper at Den of Geek thought the episode was more successful than other Marvel Studios Disney+ series at taking an underserved supporting character from the MCU films, in this case Killmonger, and giving them more screen time, and he also felt the episode played better following the release of Shang-Chi and the Legend of the Ten Rings (2021) given the involvement of the Ten Rings organization in the episode as well as Killmonger's similarities to the film's villain, Wenwu. However, Jasper felt it was the "flattest" episode of the series so far and gave it 2.5 out of 5 stars, criticizing it as "meander[ing] until abruptly ending" following the reveal of Killmonger's intentions. IGN's Tom Jorgensen also criticized the episode's abrupt ending and felt the final battle lacked stakes, but he was otherwise more positive about the episode and gave it 7 out of 10. He agreed with Jasper that the episode did a good job taking Killmonger from the films and expanding on him, praising the decision to keep the character's motivations the same and just change the setting that he is in as a way to show what the version of Killmonger from Black Panther would have done with more screen time. He positively compared this to the series' second episode as well as the Star Wars film Rogue One (2016), which he thought was another good example of expanding on an existing story to add meaning to the original.

Sam Barsanti at The A.V. Club and Charles Pulliam-Moore at io9 were also critical of the episode's abrupt ending, but Barsanti was less concerned about it due to the series' premise not promising complete stories. He was critical of some of the animation, but thought the final battle was well done and gave the episode a "B−". Amon Warmann, in his review for Yahoo! News, said the episode reinforced why Killmonger was one of the best MCU villains and praised the final battle as the episode's highlight. He was also positive of T'Challa's Black Panther mercenary fight and confrontation with Killmonger on the Ancestral Plane. Pulliam-Moore praised the calm tone and sound mixing, with its prioritization of voice actors over action. He thought the combination of Stark and Killmonger worked well and opined that Stark's interactions with Killmonger were similar to how he treats Rhodes as a "Black Friend™" in the films. Pulliam-Moore did think the episode was less successful than Black Panther in explaining Killmonger's motivations, and he also questioned the choice to so clearly frame him as the episode's villain. Several critics highlighted the episode's reveal that Killmonger is a fan of anime and designed Gundam-inspired robots, including Briana Lawrence of The Mary Sue. She wrote that some fans, including herself, had already considered Killmonger to be an anime fan due to Jordan being one himself and his costume having similarities to that of Dragon Ball character Vegeta. She said they were surprised and happy that this episode confirmed it.
