= Scarlet Witch (disambiguation) =

Scarlet Witch may refer to:

- Scarlet Witch, the Marvel Comics character
- Scarlet Witch (Marvel Cinematic Universe), the Marvel Cinematic Universe film version
- "Scarlet Witch" (MPower), an episode of MPower
- "Scarlet Witch" (Marvel Studios: Legends), an episode of Marvel Studios: Legends
