= Zemo (disambiguation) =

Wanda Maximoff may refer to:

- Baron Zemo, the Marvel Comics character
- Helmut Zemo (Marvel Cinematic Universe), the Marvel Cinematic Universe version
- "Zemo" (Marvel Studios: Legends), an episode of Marvel Studios: Legends
