= What If... Thor Were an Only Child? =

- What If...? episode
- Promotional poster
- Episode no.: Season 1 Episode 7
- Directed by: Bryan Andrews
- Written by: A. C. Bradley
- Editing by: Joel Fisher
- Original release date: September 22, 2021
- Running time: 32 minutes

Cast
- Chris Hemsworth as Thor; Natalie Portman as Jane Foster; Tom Hiddleston as Loki; Kat Dennings as Darcy Lewis; Samuel L. Jackson as Nick Fury; Jeff Goldblum as Grandmaster; Cobie Smulders as Maria Hill; Clark Gregg as Phil Coulson; Frank Grillo as Brock Rumlow; Taika Waititi as Korg; Karen Gillan as Nebula; Jaimie Alexander as Sif; Seth Green as Howard the Duck; Alexandra Daniels as Carol Danvers / Captain Marvel; Rachel House as Topaz; Josette Eales as Frigga; David Chen as Hogun; Fred Tatasciore as Volstagg and Drax; Max Mittelman as Fandral; Clancy Brown as Surtur

Episode chronology
← Previous "What If... Killmonger Rescued Tony Stark?"	Next → "What If... Ultron Won?"
- What If...? season 1

"What If... Thor Were an Only Child?" is the seventh episode of the first season of the American animated television series What If...?, based on the Marvel Comics series of the same name. It explores what would happen if the events of the Marvel Cinematic Universe (MCU) film Thor (2011) occurred differently, with Thor growing up without his adopted brother Loki and adopting a party lifestyle. The episode was written by head writer A. C. Bradley and directed by Bryan Andrews.

Jeffrey Wright narrates the series as the Watcher, with this episode also starring the voices of Chris Hemsworth (Thor), Natalie Portman, Tom Hiddleston (Loki), Kat Dennings, Samuel L. Jackson, Jeff Goldblum, Cobie Smulders, Clark Gregg, Frank Grillo, Taika Waititi, Karen Gillan, Jaimie Alexander, Seth Green, Alexandra Daniels, and Rachel House. The series began development by September 2018, with Andrews and Bradley joining soon after, and many actors expected to reprise their roles from the MCU films. Animation for the episode was provided by Squeeze, with Stephan Franck serving as head of animation.

"What If... Thor Were an Only Child?" was released on Disney+ on September 22, 2021. The episode was well received and praised for its tone, comedy, the fight scene between Thor and Captain Marvel (Daniels), and the vocal performances of Hemsworth, Portman, Hiddleston and Dennings.

== Plot ==
Towards the end of the Asgard—Jotunheim war, Odin finds the Frost Giant baby Loki and takes him back to his father Laufey, (Note: This action is when the story diverges from the events of the film Thor (2011).) forming a truce with the Frost Giants.

Centuries later, when Odin goes into the Odinsleep, his wife Frigga instructs their son Thor to study while she visits her sister. Thor instead travels to Las Vegas to start a party, inviting humans, Asgardians, and aliens alike. Astrophysicist Jane Foster warns the government, but upon meeting Thor, she grows close to him. S.H.I.E.L.D. director Nick Fury tries to stop Thor, but is accidentally knocked out by Korg.

The next day, acting S.H.I.E.L.D. director Maria Hill confronts Foster due to her warning. As more aliens and a group of Frost Giants led by an adult Prince Loki arrive and Thor starts throwing destructive parties worldwide, Hill calls in Carol Danvers to persuade Thor to leave. However, he refuses and eventually defeats Danvers due to her unwillingness to use her full power out of fear of causing casualties. Following this, Foster's intern, Darcy Lewis, suggests that Danvers attack Thor in less populated areas instead.

Seeking a more peaceful solution, Foster contacts Heimdall, who helps her meet Frigga and explain the situation. As Danvers fights Thor in Siberia, Hill authorizes a nuclear strike on Thor, but both it and the fight are called off when Frigga contacts Thor and tells him that she will be returning soon. Frightened, Thor ends the parties and convinces the party-goers to help him clean up. Frigga arrives, finding Thor studying with his retinue, but sees evidence of the partying.

Before returning to Asgard, Thor visits Foster to forgive her, thank her for contacting Frigga, and ask her out for a date, but is suddenly confronted by an alternate reality variant of Ultron in Vision's body and wielding the Infinity Stones.

== Production ==
=== Development ===
External videos
- What If... Thor Were an Only Child? | Marvel Studios' What If...? | Disney+, a promotional video introducing the episode's "what if" concept with narration by Jeffrey Wright as the Watcher, video from the What If...? Twitter account

By September 2018, Marvel Studios was developing an animated anthology series based on the What If...? comic books, which would explore how the Marvel Cinematic Universe (MCU) films would be altered if certain events occurred differently. Head writer A. C. Bradley joined the project in October 2018, with director Bryan Andrews meeting Marvel Studios executive Brad Winderbaum about the project as early as 2018; Bradley and Andrews' involvement was announced in August 2019. They executive produce alongside Winderbaum, Kevin Feige, Louis D'Esposito, and Victoria Alonso. Bradley wrote the seventh episode, titled "What If... Thor Were an Only Child?", which features an alternate storyline of the film Thor (2011). "What If... Thor Were an Only Child?" was released on Disney+ on September 22, 2021.

=== Writing ===
In the episode's alternate storyline, Thor adopts a party lifestyle instead of becoming a serious superhero as the God of Thunder due to never being raised alongside his adoptive brother Loki. The story, less serious than other of the season's episodes, was inspired by the party and romantic comedy films from the 1980s and 1990s. A fan of Thor's romantic relationship with Jane Foster, Bradley wanted to play with their love story without the "framework of tragedy". She also noted how Loki's lack of presence during Thor's growth, due to the mischievous Loki always making Thor look like a well-behaved son, would affect Thor, without his adoptive brother dragging him to trouble, making him less interested in becoming King of Asgard. Andrews felt that the episode reinvents a totally different Thor to the comedic one seen in Thor: Ragnarok (2017) and Avengers: Endgame (2019). Unlike the show's fourth episode, Bradley considered this episode's plot to be "less tragic", being more "fun and silly". This version of Thor was marketed as "Party Thor". Bradley chose to pair up Darcy Lewis and Howard the Duck while performing the scratch track for Lewis' voice, given her ability to imitate Lewis and her love for Howard and voice actor Seth Green. Their storyline is continued in the third season episode "What If... Howard the Duck Got Hitched?". Hela was considered to appear in the episode, but Bradley and story editor Matthew Chauncey felt the character would not fit the tone of this episode, instead saving the character for her own episode that would be part of the second season.

=== Casting ===
Jeffrey Wright narrates the episode as the Watcher, with Marvel planning to have other characters in the series voiced by the actors who portrayed them in the MCU films. The episode stars Thor actors Chris Hemsworth as Thor, Natalie Portman as Jane Foster, Tom Hiddleston as Loki, Kat Dennings as Darcy Lewis, Samuel L. Jackson as Nick Fury, Clark Gregg as Phil Coulson, and Jaimie Alexander as Sif, alongside Thor: Ragnarok actors Jeff Goldblum as Grandmaster, Taika Waititi as Korg, Rachel House as Topaz, and Clancy Brown as Surtur. Also reprising their MCU roles are Cobie Smulders as Maria Hill, Frank Grillo as Brock Rumlow, Karen Gillan as Nebula, and Seth Green as Howard the Duck. When Green recorded his lines, Bradley approached him to record his role like a "throwback" to Can't Hardly Wait (1998), unaware that Green had previously starred in that film.

Alexandra Daniels and Fred Tatasciore reprise their roles as Carol Danvers / Captain Marvel and Drax, respectively, from the third and second episode, in which they replaced MCU stars Brie Larson and Dave Bautista. Tatasciore also voices Volstagg, replacing Ray Stevenson. Other actors taking over from MCU stars in the episode include Josette Eales as Frigga, replacing Rene Russo, David Chen as Hogun, replacing Tadanobu Asano, and Max Mittelman as Fandral, replacing Zachary Levi.

The episode was recorded later in the development of the show's first season, allowing the actors, already with experience from earlier episodes, to improvise different lines. The episode includes cameo appearances from several MCU characters in non-speaking roles, including Odin, Heimdall, Valkyrie, Skurge, and the Frost Giants from the Thor films, as well as Rocket, Yondu Udonta, Mantis, Ultron/Vision, and members of the Skrull and Sovereign species.

=== Animation ===
Animation for the episode was provided by Squeeze, with Stephan Franck serving as head of animation. Andrews developed the series' cel-shaded animation style with Ryan Meinerding, the head of visual development at Marvel Studios. Though the series has a consistent art style, elements such as the camera and color palette differ between episodes.

=== Music ===
A soundtrack for the episode was released digitally by Marvel Music and Hollywood Records on September 24, 2021, featuring composer Laura Karpman's score.

What If... Thor Were an Only Child? (Original Soundtrack)
No.	Title	Length
1.	"They're Here"	1:08
2.	"Different Prince"	0:59
3.	"Solstice"	1:25
4.	"Company's Here"	0:46
5.	"Your Party"	1:43
6.	"Butt Ugly Popsicle Stick"	0:37
7.	"Make a Wish"	1:00
8.	"Party Pooper / Hammerang"	0:55
9.	"Party Foul"	1:08
10.	"Goose"	1:10
11.	"See You Again"	0:43
12.	"Kaboom"	0:40
13.	"Waddling Back"	0:41
14.	"Good to Go / Distracted"	1:23
15.	"Mellow / OH NO!!!!"	1:31
16.	"Get It Together"	1:30
17.	"Pooping the Party"	1:08
18.	"She's Coming!"	0:46
19.	"You Called"	1:11
20.	"Study Group"	1:16
Total length:		21:40

== Marketing ==
After the episode's release, Marvel released a poster for the episode, featuring Grandmaster, Thor, and Howard the Duck together with a quote from the episode. Marvel also announced merchandise inspired by the episode as part of its weekly "Marvel Must Haves" promotion for each episode of the series, including apparel, accessories, and a Funko Pop based on Party Thor.

== Reception ==
=== Audience viewership ===
What If...? was the fourth-most streamed series for viewers in the United States for the week ending September 19, 2021 according to Whip Media's TV Time.

=== Critical response ===
Kirsten Howard at Den of Geek praised the interactions between Hemsworth and Hiddleston, citing how entertaining it was to see their relationship without the "rivalry and resentment" they have in the films. She complimented Dennings' acting, which she compared favorably to the voice performances of previous episodes. Howard considered the fight between Danvers and Thor was "spectacularly put together", she thought the cliffhanger ending with Ultron's appearance was "superb", and gave the episode 4.5 out of 5 stars. IGN's Tom Jorgensen considered it the series' "most fun episode yet", which he commended as an "excellent change of pace" from the serious nature of previous episodes, and compared its tone to Thor: Ragnarok, giving it 8 out of 10. Jorgensen praised the animation and the references to the Golden age of American animation, such as the names written across the countries. He also highlighted Hemsworth's comedic performance and Portman's "lighter, feistier" version of Jane Foster. However, he considered Danvers' appearance felt "a little forced."

Karen Rought at Hypable compared the episode's incarnation of Thor to Hemsworth's portrayal of James Hunt in Rush (2013). She also praised the shift in tone to comedy, as did Amon Warmann, who considered it refreshing in his review for Yahoo! Movies. Warmann questioned the verisimilitude of the premise, but found it justifiable being "in service of fun". He praised the performances of Daniels and Dennings, and thought the chemistry between Hemsworth and Portman was a positive sign for their reprisal in Thor: Love and Thunder (2022). Conversely, Sam Barsanti at The A.V. Club was more critical of the episode's different tone, which he thought missed the chance to give "some thoughtful meta-commentary on the MCU", giving it a "C+". Barsanti considered the comedy wasn't MCU-centric or strong enough for a fully comedic episode, and felt the premise was forced and unnatural for the characters. He also criticized Larson's absence, arguing that "some of these stories only work if you have the movie actors involved." However, he highlighted Dennings' performance, and praised the Thor and Danvers' fight scene, noting it as an homage to Dragon Ball (1986–1989).
