= Wanda Maximoff (disambiguation) =

Wanda Maximoff may refer to:

- Wanda Maximoff, the Marvel Comics character
- Wanda Maximoff (Marvel Cinematic Universe), the Marvel Cinematic Universe version
- "Wanda Maximoff" (Marvel Studios: Legends), an episode of Marvel Studios: Legends
