= What If...? season 3 =

What If...?
- Season 3
- Promotional poster
- Starring: Jeffrey Wright
- No. of episodes: 8

Release
- Original network: Disney+
- Original release: December 22 – December 29, 2024

Season chronology
- ← Previous; Season 2

The third and final season of the American animated anthology series What If...?, based on the Marvel Comics series of the same name, explores alternate timelines in the multiverse that show what would happen if major moments from the films of the Marvel Cinematic Universe (MCU) occurred differently. The season is produced by Marvel Studios Animation, with Matthew Chauncey serving as head writer and Bryan Andrews and Stephan Franck directing. Animation for the season is provided by Flying Bark Productions and Stellar Creative Lab, with Scott Wright serving as head of animation.

Jeffrey Wright stars as the Watcher, who narrates the series, alongside numerous MCU film actors reprising their roles. Development began by July 2022, with Chauncey replacing previous head writer A. C. Bradley for the season by December 2023. Andrews and Franck returned from previous seasons to direct.

The third season premiered on the streaming service Disney+ on December 22, 2024, with its remaining episodes released daily until December 29. It is part of Phase Five of the MCU.

== Episodes ==
No. overall	No. in season	Title	Directed by	Written by	Original release date
19	1	"What If... the Hulk Fought the Mech Avengers?"	Stephan Franck	Story by : A. C. Bradley and Bryan Andrews; Teleplay by : Ryan Little	December 22, 2024
In an attempt to rid himself of the Hulk, Bruce Banner bombards himself with a huge amount of gamma radiation, accidentally resulting in the birth of a monstrous creature known as the "Apex", a rampaging kaiju capable of creating an army of gamma monsters. The Avengers create enormous mechas to counter the threat, but are outnumbered and killed. The surviving heroes—consisting of Sam Wilson, Monica Rambeau, Bucky Barnes, Marc Spector, Alexei Shostakov, Melina Vostokoff, Xu Shang-Chi, and Nakia—form a new Avengers team and eventually repel the gamma monsters for the next ten years. When the Apex reemerges, a reluctant Wilson seeks help from Banner, who lives in hiding on a remote island. Banner refuses to get involved, though he provides Wilson with the "Mighty Avenger Protocol", which he originally created to stop the Hulk. Using the protocol, the heroes' mechs combine into one powerful mech, but the Apex is still too much for them. Banner decides to assist the team and uses a gamma bomb to become a Godzilla-like "Mega-Hulk". He kills the Apex and heads towards New York with its army. However, Wilson reminds him of their friendship, prompting Banner to lead the remaining gamma monsters to his island instead where he becomes their new ruler. Cast: Anthony Mackie as Sam Wilson / Captain America, Mark Ruffalo as Bruce Banner / Hulk, Teyonah Parris as Monica Rambeau, Sebastian Stan as Bucky Barnes, David Harbour as Alexei Shostakov / Red Guardian, Simu Liu as Xu Shang-Chi, Kari Wahlgren as Melina Vostokoff, Brittany Adebumola as Nakia, and Oscar Isaac as Marc Spector / Moon Knight.
20	2	"What If... Agatha Went to Hollywood?"	Bryan Andrews	Story by : Bryan Andrews, Matthew Chauncey, and Ryan Little; Teleplay by : Matthew Chauncey and Ryan Little	December 23, 2024
Agatha Harkness plans to enact a magical ritual to siphon the power of Tiamut, the Celestial buried in the Earth's core. In order to do so, she becomes an actress during the Golden Age of Hollywood and stars in a film directed by Howard Stark. Harkness has Stark cast Kingo, the final Eternal she needs for her spell to work, as she has already taken the other Eternals' powers. Kingo reveals that he knows of Harkness's true plans, but decides to help after she pretends her desire is to save the world and agrees to release the Eternals once the ritual is complete. Witnessing Kingo's betrayal, Arishem decides to destroy the Earth, motivating Harkness and Kingo to enact the ritual upon that Celestial's arrival. With help from Stark and Edwin Jarvis, Harkness takes Kingo's and Tiamut's powers and becomes a Celestial. After defeating Arishem, Kingo convinces Harkness to give up the Celestial power in favor of joining him in the movie business for real. During the premiere of their movie Cosmic Queen, Kingo notes that the released Eternals are worried that Arishem's defeat has drawn the other Celestials' attention, but Harkness assures him that they can be "saved for the sequel". Cast: Kathryn Hahn as Agatha Harkness, Kumail Nanjiani as Kingo, Dominic Cooper as Howard Stark, James D'Arcy as Edwin Jarvis, and David Kaye as Arishem.
21	3	"What If... the Red Guardian Stopped the Winter Soldier?"	Bryan Andrews	A. C. Bradley	December 24, 2024
In 1991, Alexei Shostakov and Bucky Barnes are sent to recover a case of super-soldier serum from Howard and Maria Stark. Shostakov prevents Barnes from killing the Starks and they only acquire one vial of the serum. (Note: This is where the story diverges from the events of both Captain America: Civil War (2016), where Barnes kills the Starks, and Black Widow (2021), where Shostakov instead goes to America in 1995 as a sleeper agent.) With no extraction, the duo tracks a spy called the "Rook" to Las Vegas for transportation while evading the authorities and Bill Foster. Dreykov secretly orders Barnes to kill Shostakov, who has become a liability. In Las Vegas, Shostakov and Barnes discover that the Rook is Obadiah Stane, who provided the Russians with information about the serum in order to eliminate the Starks from the market. Stane attacks the duo, but is killed by Barnes. As the authorities and a task force sent by the Red Room swarm the area, Shostakov destroys the last vial of the serum, and Barnes buys him time to escape. Some time later, Barnes is taken back to Hydra's base in Siberia, where he insists to Dreykov that Shostakov is dead. Meanwhile, Foster approaches Shostakov and offers him a chance to help the United States once again. 21 years later, Shostakov is seen fighting alongside the Avengers in the Battle of New York. Cast: David Harbour as Alexei Shostakov / Red Guardian, Sebastian Stan as Bucky Barnes / Winter Soldier, Laurence Fishburne as Bill Foster / Goliath, America Ferrera as Ranger Morales, Piotr Michael as Dreykov, Gene Farber as Karpov, and Kiff VandenHeuvel as Obadiah Stane / "Rook".
22	4	"What If... Howard the Duck Got Hitched?"	Stephan Franck	Story by : Bryan Andrews, Matthew Chauncey, and Ryan Little; Teleplay by : Matthew Chauncey and Ryan Little	December 25, 2024
During Thor's party on Earth, (Note: As depicted in the first season episode "What If... Thor Were an Only Child?") Howard the Duck marries Darcy Lewis, and they have a baby that takes the form of an egg. They join the Grandmaster on his intergalactic cruise, but he takes the egg and attempts to cook it for a breakfast before Yondu Udonta steals it. As the couple gives chase, Nick Fury and Phil Coulson explain that because their child was born during a rare alignment of the Nine Realms called the Convergence, it is destined for great things and has become highly sought after by several factions. On Knowhere, Yondu delivers the egg to Kaecilius who kills Yondu and attempts to use the egg as a host body for Dormammu. S.H.I.E.L.D. attacks, intending to acquire the egg, though the couple recovers it and seeks shelter from Loki on Jotunheim. However, Laufey, Malekith, Zeus, and Thanos and his Black Order are also after the egg, and a chase ensues. As the couple is cornered, the egg suddenly glows gold, rises into the sky and subdues the pursuers with golden energy. It hatches into a human/duck hybrid which the parents name Byrdie. Fury admits that the child should stay with her family, and they return home peacefully. Cast: Kat Dennings as Darcy Lewis, Seth Green as Howard the Duck, Samuel L. Jackson as Nick Fury, Tom Hiddleston as Loki, Clark Gregg as Phil Coulson, Michael Rooker as Yondu Udonta, Matt Friend as the Grandmaster, Josh Brolin as Thanos, Rachel House as Topaz, Jared Butler as Kaecilius, Andrew Morgado as Laufey, Darin De Paul as Zeus, Chris Hemsworth as Thor, Tom Vaughan-Lawlor as Ebony Maw, Steven French as Malekith, Kari Wahlgren as Carina, and Hamish Parkinson as Beerbot 5000.
23	5	"What If... the Emergence Destroyed the Earth?"	Stephan Franck	Story by : Bryan Andrews, Matthew Chauncey, and Ryan Little; Teleplay by : Matthew Chauncey and Ryan Little	December 26, 2024
After the Earth is split apart by the Emergence, Quentin Beck overtakes Stark Industries, creating an army of drones called the Iron Federation to subjugate the survivors. In the present, Riri Williams is recruited by Wong, Okoye, Valkyrie, and Ying Nan to join their "Alliance". After defeating Beck's lieutenant Vision, Williams uses his components to become a human-synthezoid hybrid. While the Alliance holds off the Federation, Williams infiltrates Beck's base to destroy the nanites powering his illusion. However, her suit fails and she loses the ability to see through Beck's illusions, and is lured into a prison cell, where Beck explains that he uploaded the nanites into himself, meaning he can control illusions with his mind. The nanites are also killing him, so he intends to merge with Vision to live longer. Williams breaks free, only to learn that her comrades are dead and everything since Vision's defeat has been an illusion. The Watcher intervenes by encouraging Williams to fight back, so she siphons the nanites off Beck's body, killing him and destroying the Federation. Williams then projects the Avengers logo into the sky to give the survivors hope. Elsewhere, three other Watchers are displeased by the Watcher's continued interference. Cast: Dominique Thorne as Riri Williams / Ironheart, Alejandro Saab as Quentin Beck / Mysterio, Emily VanCamp as Sharon Carter / Power Broker, Kenna Ramsey as Okoye, David Chen as Wong, Tessa Thompson as Valkyrie, Michelle Wong as Ying Nan, Jason Isaacs as the Eminence, D. C. Douglas as the Incarnate, and Darin De Paul as the Executioner.
24	6	"What If... 1872?"	Stephan Franck and Bryan Andrews	Story by : Bryan Andrews, Matthew Chauncey, and Ryan Little; Teleplay by : Matthew Chauncey and Ryan Little	December 27, 2024
In the 1860s, Xu Xialing fled to America for a better life only to fall victim to the Hood's plan to enslave Chinese immigrants in order to consolidate his power. In 1872, Xu Shang-Chi is searching for his sister alongside Kate Bishop, who wants revenge on the Hood for killing her family. They find a decimated township and meet a boy, Kwai Jun-Fan, who claims the Hood attacked and left on a train. Shang-Chi, Bishop, and Jun-Fan find and board the train, where they discover that the missing immigrants have been brainwashed by the Hood's enforcer Sonny Burch. The Watcher helps Jun-Fan survive while Shang-Chi and Bishop are taken to the Hood, who is revealed to be a corrupted Xialing, who killed the original Hood and stole his powers. Burch hypnotizes Bishop and confesses to killing her parents, planning to kill her as well until Jun-Fan rings a bell, freeing the prisoners, allowing Bishop to knock Burch out, and distracting Xialing so Shang-Chi could get the upper hand. Shang-Chi refuses to join or fight Xialing and Bishop kills her. Later, the pair observes Jun-Fan with the immigrants and rides off into the sunset. Subsequently, the Watcher is punished by the other Watchers for his interference, causing shards of their Observational Plane to spill into the multiverse. Cast: Simu Liu as Xu Shang-Chi / Ten Rings, Hailee Steinfeld as Kate Bishop, Wyatt Russell as John Walker / U.S. Agent, Meng'er Zhang as Xu Xialing / The Hood, Walton Goggins as Sonny Burch, Allen Deng as Kwai Jun-Fan, and Jason Isaacs as the Eminence.
25	7	"What If... the Watcher Disappeared?"	Stephan Franck	Story by : Bryan Andrews, Matthew Chauncey, and Ryan Little; Teleplay by : Matthew Chauncey and Ryan Little	December 28, 2024
In the Fifth Dimension, the Watcher stands trial before the other three Watchers, the Eminence, the Incarnate, and the Executioner, while Captain Peggy Carter leads a team consisting of Kahhori, a grown-up Byrdie, and a Mjolnir-wielding Storm in stopping multiversal incursions. After preventing an inter-dimensional universe-eater (Note: Previously seen in the first season episode "What If... Captain Carter Were the First Avenger?".) from attacking Earth-625, (Note: The universe of the second season episode "What If... Nebula Joined the Nova Corps?") Carter and her team notice three shards from the Watcher's Observational Plane and resolve to help him. After their first attempts to synthesize the shards fail and cost them two, the group consider requesting help from a variant of Infinity Ultron, agreeing to use Time Variance Authority (TVA) equipment to prune him should he go rogue. After a heart-to-heart with Storm, Carter resolves to meet with Infinity Ultron alone, only to be captured by the Eminence. Noticing Carter went missing, Kahhori, Byrdie, and Storm confront Ultron, who reveals that he has realized there is no peace without life and concludes that he made a mistake in extinguishing all life in his universe. Though it is too late for redemption, he is willing to atone for his actions and absorbs the shard before agreeing to take them to rescue Carter and the Watcher. Cast: Hayley Atwell as Peggy Carter / Captain Carter, Jason Isaacs as the Eminence, Devery Jacobs as Kahhori, Alison Sealy-Smith as Ororo Munroe / Storm the Goddess of Thunder, Natasha Lyonne as Byrdie, Karen Gillan as Nebula, Kat Dennings as Darcy Lewis, Seth Green as Howard the Duck, Taika Waititi as Korg, Ross Marquand as Infinity Ultron, Fred Tatasciore as Groot, D. C. Douglas as the Incarnate, Darin De Paul as the Executioner, and Alexandra Daniels as Carol Danvers / Captain Marvel.
26	8	"What If... What If?"	Bryan Andrews	Teleplay by : Matthew Chauncey and Ryan Little; Story by : Bryan Andrews, Matthew Chauncey, and Ryan Little	December 29, 2024
In a flashback, a Watcher disciple named Uatu was recruited to become a full Watcher by the Eminence. In the present, the Watcher is placed on trial for his repeated interference, such as giving Doctor Strange Supreme the information he needed to recreate his destroyed universe, (Note: As depicted in the second season episode "What If... Strange Supreme Intervened?") saving Riri Williams and Kwai Jun-Fan amongst others, as well as involving Captain Carter in his affairs. The Watcher and Carter are rescued by Ultron, who sacrifices himself to buy them time to escape. The Watchers give chase, attempting to erase them from existence, but the Watcher grants Carter's team the powers of a Watcher before Carter sacrifices herself to transport everyone to Strange Supreme's universe where Strange, having become the sentient consciousness of that universe, removes the powers of the Eminence, Incarnate, and Executioner. The Watcher convinces the humbled trio to learn by watching over life in this new universe. As they mourn Carter's death, the Watcher invites Kahhori, Byrdie, and Storm to join him in watching over the multiverse. Cast: Hayley Atwell as Peggy Carter / Captain Carter, Jason Isaacs as the Eminence, Devery Jacobs as Kahhori, Alison Sealy-Smith as Ororo Munroe / Storm the Goddess of Thunder, Natasha Lyonne as Byrdie, Ross Marquand as Infinity Ultron, D. C. Douglas as the Incarnate, and Darin De Paul as the Executioner.

== Cast and characters ==
The series is narrated by Jeffrey Wright as the Watcher, a member of the alien Watcher race who observes the multiverse. Each episode features different versions of characters from the MCU films, with many actors reprising their roles for the series.

== Production ==
=== Development ===
Work had begun on a third season of What If...? by July 2022. At that time, head writer A. C. Bradley revealed that the second season of the series was her final project at Marvel Studios, with series story editor Matthew Chauncey taking over as head writer for the season. Series director Bryan Andrews returned for the third season along with Stephan Franck. The season consists of eight episodes. Franck was able to assist Andrews in the season while the latter was simultaneously working on Marvel Zombies (2025); Andrews was still able to supervise much of the season and ultimately directed three of the season's episodes and co-directed with Franck for one episode, with Franck directing the other four episodes of the season. A Red Guardian–centered episode, written by Bradley in 2020, is included in the season after originally being intended for the second season. Executive producers for the season include Brad Winderbaum, Kevin Feige, Louis D'Esposito, Dana Vasquez-Eberhardt, and Andrews. In August 2024, it was announced that the third season would be the series' last. That November, Winderbaum explained that the series was ending due to "bigger [MCU] reasons" that were being determined in real time as different projects were released within the Multiverse Saga. He said it was the right time for the series to conclude "from a story perspective", but did not rule out reviving it in the future.

=== Writing ===
Bradley and Ryan Little served as writers on the season alongside Chauncey. Winderbaum described the season as being the culmination of a trilogy, completing an "emotional experience" with the Watcher whose humanity is explored more than in previous seasons. He added that the season would have the first hints at "crossover potential" between the series and Marvel Studios' other animated projects. Some of the unused episode concepts that were created for the first and second season were used for the third. Andrews said the third season's episode concepts were "wackier" than those used for the first two seasons, and further explore different genres.

Episodes include: an anime-inspired episode featuring the Avengers piloting mechs to fight a horde of Mega-Hulk monsters, titled "Go-Avengers: Heroes of the Gamma War", with Andrews excited to go "full, hardcore, mega genre" with the episode; one with a "1930s screwball" Bollywood musical number featuring Agatha Harkness and Kingo; one that sees Red Guardian stopping the Winter Soldier from assassinating Howard and Maria Stark and the two becoming allies; one that revisits Howard the Duck and Darcy Lewis from the first season episode "What If... Thor Were an Only Child?", who have since gotten married and must protect their child from various threats; one where an alternate take on the events of Eternals (2021) leads to the destruction of Earth and the rise of an authoritarian regime led by Quentin Beck; and a Western-themed episode, a genre which Andrews had wanted to explore since the first season.

Ideas that were considered for the season but not used include trying to involve the band Kiss in six different episodes, one of which would have been a galactic Battle of the Bands concept with Kiss serving as the judges; a samurai episode that Andrews described as "hardcore and just brutal and awesome" with elements of Romeo and Juliet; a Dungeons & Dragons-styled episode; an episode centered on Sam Wilson and Yelena Belova where the latter would be the Winter Soldier; and a kung fu-themed episode featuring Iron Fist and Xu Shang-Chi. Andrews also wanted to include the characters Beta Ray Bill and Ghost Rider, but Marvel informed him that they were off-limits because they may appear in future projects and wanted to prevent the writers from telling similar stories. Furthermore, despite technically having access to X-Men characters due to X-Men '97 (2024–present) being released prior to the season, Andrews and his team were unaware of whether they had permission to do so during development. In retrospect, Andrews expressed regret towards not using Hugh Jackman's Logan / Wolverine.

=== Casting ===
Jeffrey Wright returns to narrate the series as the Watcher. Marvel's plan for the series was to have actors who portray characters in the MCU reprise their roles in What If...?, with over 35 doing so for the season. These include: Anthony Mackie as Sam Wilson / Captain America, Mark Ruffalo as Bruce Banner / Hulk, Teyonah Parris as Monica Rambeau, Sebastian Stan as Bucky Barnes / Winter Soldier, David Harbour as Alexei Shostakov / Red Guardian, Simu Liu as Xu Shang-Chi, Oscar Isaac as Marc Spector / Moon Knight, Kathryn Hahn as Agatha Harkness, Kumail Nanjiani as Kingo, Dominic Cooper as Howard Stark, James D'Arcy as Edwin Jarvis, David Kaye as Arishem, Laurence Fishburne as Bill Foster / Goliath, Gene Farber as Karpov, Kat Dennings as Darcy Lewis, Seth Green as Howard the Duck, Samuel L. Jackson as Nick Fury, Tom Hiddleston as Loki, Clark Gregg as Phil Coulson, Michael Rooker as Yondu Udonta, Josh Brolin as Thanos, Rachel House as Topaz, Chris Hemsworth as Thor, Tom Vaughan-Lawlor as Ebony Maw, Hamish Parkinson as Beerbot 5000, Dominique Thorne as Riri Williams / Ironheart, Emily VanCamp as Sharon Carter / Power Broker, Tessa Thompson as Valkyrie, Hailee Steinfeld as Kate Bishop, Wyatt Russell as John Walker / U.S. Agent, Meng'er Zhang as Xu Xialing, Walton Goggins as Sonny Burch, Hayley Atwell as Peggy Carter / Captain Carter, Devery Jacobs as Kahhori, Karen Gillan as Nebula, Taika Waititi as Korg, and Ross Marquand as Infinity Ultron.

Several characters in the season are voiced by different actors than those who portrayed them in MCU films, including: Kari Wahlgren as Melina Vostokoff and Carina, Brittany Adebumola as Nakia, Piotr Michael as Dreykov, Kiff VandenHeuvel as Obadiah Stane, Matt Friend as Grandmaster, Jared Butler as Kaecilius, Andrew Morgado as Laufey, Darin De Paul as Zeus, Steven French as Malekith, Alejandro Saab as Quentin Beck / Mysterio, Kenna Ramsey as Okoye, David Chen as Wong, Michelle Wong as Ying Nan, Fred Tatasciore as Groot, and Alexandra Daniels as Carol Danvers / Captain Marvel. Characters introduced in the season include: America Ferrera as Ranger Morales; Natasha Lyonne as Byrdie the Duck; Jason Isaacs, D. C. Douglas, and Darin De Paul as a trio of Watchers named the Eminence, the Incarnate, and the Executioner, respectively; and Allen Deng as Kwai Jun-Fan. Additionally, Alison Sealy-Smith voices Ororo Munroe / Storm the Goddess of Thunder, having previously done so for a different version of the character in the Marvel series X-Men: The Animated Series (1992–1997) and X-Men '97. Andrews recalled it was Winderbaum's idea to use Storm in the series, as X-Men '97 was going to be released prior to the season so they would have access to all X-Men characters shown in that series.

=== Animation ===
"What If... the Hulk Fought the Mech Avengers" includes 2D animation inspired by anime from the 1970s and 1980s, before shifting to the series' usual 3D animation. Andrews hand-animated much of the final fight in "What If... 1872?", working alongside the season's head of animation Scott Wright. Flying Bark Productions worked on six episodes, and Stellar Creative Lab worked on two episodes.

=== Music ===
Laura Karpman returned from previous seasons as composer, along with Nora Kroll-Rosenbaum, who composed the score with Karpman for the show's second season. An album was released on January 10, 2025.

All music is composed by Laura Karpman and Nora Kroll-Rosenbaum.

What If...?: Season 3 (Original Soundtrack)
No.	Title	Length
1.	"Chat"	1:34
2.	"Big Guns"	1:38
3.	"Comradery"	2:29
4.	"Stand Down"	2:03
5.	"Friends Again"	2:03
6.	"Never Surrender"	1:52
7.	"You Again"	2:04
8.	"We Fight Together"	1:13
9.	"Visitors Arrive"	0:54
10.	"Bedtime"	1:25
11.	"Light the Fuse"	1:49
12.	"Incoming"	0:54
13.	"The Alliance"	1:42
14.	"Lost Everything"	2:51
15.	"Revenge"	1:49
16.	"Ghost Train"	2:32
17.	"Spooky"	3:01
18.	"Ringing the Bell"	2:26
19.	"Born to Play"	0:49
20.	"The Greatest Footage"	0:54
21.	"End Credits...Hollywood"	2:22
22.	"Shards"	1:16
23.	"Arrivals"	0:53
24.	"Not Strong Enough"	2:43
25.	"Warrior"	2:44
26.	"Help"	3:21
27.	"The Oath"	2:11
28.	"Not Losing"	1:12
29.	"Lessons"	1:51
30.	"Learn to See"	1:31
31.	"Another Question"	1:46
Total length:		58:00

== Marketing ==
The first footage from the season was released in December 2023, as part of the second season's "The Watcher's Nine Days of What If...?" advent calendar-style website, while images from the episodes were released the following month. Andrews and Winderbaum promoted the series during Marvel Studios Animation's panel at the D23 Expo in August 2024, where footage was shown. More footage from the season was included in a video that was released by Disney+ in October, announcing the release schedule for Marvel Television and Marvel Animation projects through the end of 2025.

== Release ==
The third season debuted on Disney+ on December 22, 2024, and its eight episodes were released daily until December 29. In January 2024, Andrews said a late 2024 release was possible, but the deadline was "tight" and he noted that Marvel Studios and Disney were continually shifting releases around. That May, Winderbaum said work was nearly completed on the season and it was likely to be the studio's next animated project to be released; this and a December 2024 release was confirmed in October. The season is part of Phase Five of the MCU.

== Reception ==
=== Critical response ===
The third season holds an 81% approval rating on Rotten Tomatoes, based on 23 reviews, with an average rating of 6.85/10.

=== Accolades ===
At the 77th Primetime Creative Arts Emmy Awards, Jeffrey Wright was nominated for Outstanding Character Voice-Over Performance for his work on "What If... 1872?", while Mac Smith, Vanessa Lapato, Alyssa Nevarez, Steve Bissinger, Derek McGinley, Anele Onyekwere, Carl Sealove, Andrea Stelter Gard, and Sean England were nominated for Outstanding Sound Editing For An Animated Program for their work on the same episode.
