= What If...? season 1 =

What If...?
- Season 1
- Promotional poster
- Starring: Jeffrey Wright
- No. of episodes: 9

Release
- Original network: Disney+
- Original release: August 11 – October 6, 2021

Season chronology
- Next → Season 2

The first season of the American animated anthology series What If...?, based on the Marvel Comics series of the same name, explores alternate timelines in the multiverse that show what would happen if major moments from the films of the Marvel Cinematic Universe (MCU) occurred differently. The season was produced by Marvel Studios Animation, with A. C. Bradley serving as head writer and Bryan Andrews directing. Animation for the season is provided by Blue Spirit, Squeeze, Flying Bark Productions, and Stellar Creative Lab, with Stephan Franck as head of animation.

Jeffrey Wright stars as the Watcher, who narrates the series, alongside many MCU film actors reprising their roles. The series was officially announced in April 2019, with many of the cast announced that July. Bradley and Andrews were confirmed in August 2019.

The first season premiered on Disney+ on August 11, 2021, and ran for nine episodes until October 6, as part of Phase Four of the MCU. The season received generally positive reviews, with praise for the voice acting and creative storylines and scenarios but some criticism for its animation, episode length, and writing. A second season was confirmed in December 2019.

== Episodes ==
No. overall	No. in season	Title	Directed by	Written by	Original release date
1	1	"What If... Captain Carter Were the First Avenger?"	Bryan Andrews	A. C. Bradley	August 11, 2021
During World War II, Steve Rogers is chosen to become the world's first super-soldier, but is wounded by a Hydra spy before he can receive the super-soldier serum. Having stayed in the operating theater, SSR agent Peggy Carter kills the spy and receives the serum instead. Despite being enhanced, she is banned from combat by SSR leader John Flynn. Nonetheless, inventor Howard Stark gives her a Vibranium shield. After successfully taking the Tesseract from Hydra, Flynn reluctantly promotes her to the combat role of "Captain Carter" while Stark uses the Tesseract to create a weaponized, armored "Hydra Stomper" suit for Rogers to pilot. Carter and Rogers fight many battles together until he goes missing while attacking a Hydra train. Carter and her allies eventually find Rogers while infiltrating a Hydra base and see Hydra's leader, the Red Skull, using the Tesseract to open a portal and summon an interdimensional creature, which kills him. Carter enters the closing portal to force the creature back. Almost 70 years later, the Tesseract opens another portal from which Carter emerges and meets Nick Fury and Clint Barton. Cast: Hayley Atwell as Peggy Carter / Captain Carter, Sebastian Stan as Bucky Barnes, Dominic Cooper as Howard Stark, Stanley Tucci as Abraham Erskine, Toby Jones as Arnim Zola, Bradley Whitford as John Flynn, Ross Marquand as Johann Schmidt / Red Skull, and Darrell Hammond as a Nazi general
2	2	"What If... T'Challa Became a Star-Lord?"	Bryan Andrews	Matthew Chauncey	August 18, 2021
In 1988, the Ravagers are sent to Earth by a Celestial called Ego to retrieve his son Peter Quill, but mistakenly abduct a young T'Challa from Wakanda. Twenty years later, T'Challa has become the famous intergalactic mercenary "Star-Lord" and been convinced by Ravager leader Yondu Udonta that Wakanda was destroyed. Nebula approaches the Ravagers and ask for their help in stealing the Embers of Genesis, a cosmic artifact capable of eradicating galactic hunger, from galactic kingpin Taneleer Tivan. At Tivan's headquarters on Knowhere, they offer him the Power Stone as a distraction while T'Challa looks for the Embers, only to find a Wakandan spacecraft that was searching for him, briefly straining his relationship with Udonta. As Nebula and the Ravagers obtain the Embers, Tivan's slave Carina rescues T'Challa and helps the Ravagers defeat Tivan. T'Challa forgives Udonta for lying about Wakanda before traveling there so T'Challa can reunite with his family. Elsewhere, Ego approaches janitor Quill at a Dairy Queen. Cast: Chadwick Boseman as Star-Lord T'Challa, Michael Rooker as Yondu Udonta, Josh Brolin as Thanos, Benicio del Toro as Taneleer Tivan / The Collector, Kurt Russell as Ego, Ophelia Lovibond as Carina, Carrie Coon as Proxima Midnight, Tom Vaughan-Lawlor as Ebony Maw, Karen Gillan as Nebula, Djimon Hounsou as Korath the Pursuer, John Kani as T'Chaka, Sean Gunn as Kraglin Obfonteri, Chris Sullivan as Taserface, Seth Green as Howard the Duck, and Danai Gurira as Okoye
3	3	"What If... the World Lost Its Mightiest Heroes?"	Bryan Andrews	A. C. Bradley & Matthew Chauncey	August 25, 2021
Over the course of a week, S.H.I.E.L.D. Director Nick Fury attempts to recruit heroes for the Avengers Initiative, but they are each mysteriously killed: Natasha Romanoff gives Tony Stark an unexpectedly fatal injection, Clint Barton accidentally shoots and kills Thor before dying in S.H.I.E.L.D. custody, Bruce Banner / Hulk explodes, and Romanoff is attacked and killed while investigating the other murders. Before she dies, Romanoff tells Fury that the murders are related to "hope". The Asgardians, led by Loki, arrive on Earth to avenge Thor, but Fury proposes an alliance to apprehend the killer. Fury deduces that Hank Pym is the murderer and has been using his shrinking technology to commit the murders as revenge for the death of his daughter Hope van Dyne, who died in the line of duty as a S.H.I.E.L.D. agent. Fury and Loki defeat Pym, who is taken into Asgardian custody. After Loki chooses to stay on Earth to become its ruler, Fury finds Steve Rogers frozen in ice and summons Carol Danvers to Earth. Cast: Samuel L. Jackson as Nick Fury, Jeremy Renner as Clint Barton / Hawkeye, Mark Ruffalo as Bruce Banner / Hulk, Tom Hiddleston as Loki, Clark Gregg as Phil Coulson, Jaimie Alexander as Sif, Frank Grillo as Brock Rumlow, Lake Bell as Natasha Romanoff / Black Widow, and Mick Wingert as Tony Stark / Iron Man
4	4	"What If... Doctor Strange Lost His Heart Instead of His Hands?"	Bryan Andrews	A. C. Bradley	September 1, 2021
After losing his girlfriend Dr. Christine Palmer in a car crash, Dr. Stephen Strange travels to Kamar-Taj and learns the Mystic Arts. He soon discovers the Eye of Agamotto, which can manipulate time, but is warned by the Ancient One and Wong that doing so could destroy reality. Two years later, Strange repeatedly attempts to use the Eye to save Palmer, but she still dies in every scenario. The Ancient One tells Strange that Palmer's death is an "absolute point" in the timeline that cannot be undone, but Strange refuses to listen. Using the power of the Dark Dimension, the Ancient One splits Strange into two alternate versions: one Strange accepts Palmer's death while the other gains power by absorbing mystical beings, becoming Strange Supreme. The corrupted Strange overpowers his counterpart before absorbing him and using his power to resurrect Palmer, tearing reality apart. Strange Supreme begs the Watcher for help, but he refuses to intervene. Palmer disintegrates and the universe collapses, leaving Strange Supreme to grieve alone. Cast: Benedict Cumberbatch as Dr. Stephen Strange and Doctor Strange Supreme, Rachel McAdams as Christine Palmer, Benedict Wong as Wong, Tilda Swinton as the Ancient One, Ike Amadi as O'Bengh, and Leslie Bibb as Christine Everhart
5	5	"What If... Zombies?!"	Bryan Andrews	Matthew Chauncey	September 8, 2021
In the Quantum Realm, Hank Pym finds Janet van Dyne, but she infects him with a quantum virus. They subsequently return to Earth and cause a zombie apocalypse. Two weeks later, a group of survivors—Bruce Banner, Hope van Dyne, Peter Parker, Bucky Barnes, Okoye, Sharon Carter, Happy Hogan, and Kurt—learn there is a potential cure at Camp Lehigh. They lose Hogan, Carter, and Hope to zombie attacks on the way there, but encounter Vision and learn his Mind Stone can reverse the virus, exemplified by a cured Scott Lang's head. However, they discover Vision has been luring people, such as T'Challa, to feed a zombified Wanda Maximoff, who is immune to the cure. The group rescue T'Challa, but Maximoff breaks free and kills Kurt, Okoye, and Barnes. Vision commits suicide while giving the Mind Stone to Parker. Banner transforms into the Hulk and sacrifices himself to battle Maximoff, allowing the others to escape. In the hopes of globally broadcasting the stone's energy, Parker, Lang, and T'Challa travel to Wakanda, where a zombified Thanos wields a nearly-complete Infinity Gauntlet. Cast: Mark Ruffalo as Bruce Banner / Hulk, Chadwick Boseman as T'Challa / Black Panther, Paul Bettany as Vision, Sebastian Stan as Bucky Barnes, Evangeline Lilly as Hope van Dyne / Wasp, Paul Rudd as Scott Lang / Ant-Man, Jon Favreau as Harold "Happy" Hogan / Zombie Happy, Danai Gurira as Okoye, Emily VanCamp as Sharon Carter, David Dastmalchian as Kurt, Hudson Thames as Peter Parker / Spider-Man, and Tom Vaughan-Lawlor as Ebony Maw
6	6	"What If... Killmonger Rescued Tony Stark?"	Bryan Andrews	Matthew Chauncey	September 15, 2021
In Afghanistan, Tony Stark is ambushed by the Ten Rings, but is saved by Erik "Killmonger" Stevens. They return to Stark Industries, where Killmonger exposes Obadiah Stane's involvement in the ambush before helping Stark build a humanoid combat drone using Vibranium. Needing more Vibranium to create a drone army, they arrange for James Rhodes to purchase it from Ulysses Klaue. At Killmonger's behest, Klaue leaks word of the transaction to Wakanda to lure in T'Challa. Killmonger kills both T'Challa and Rhodes, staging it as if they killed each other. Stark confronts Killmonger, but Killmonger kills him and makes it look like a Wakandan attack. Killmonger then kills Klaue and reunites with his relatives in Wakanda. Thaddeus Ross sends the drone army to attack Wakanda, but Killmonger helps the Wakandans defeat them, becoming the new Black Panther. As the United States prepares another attack, T'Challa's sister Shuri visits Pepper Potts, who was suspicious of Killmonger, and proposes an alliance to expose the truth. Cast: Michael B. Jordan as N'Jadaka / Erik "Killmonger" Stevens, Jon Favreau as Happy Hogan, Chadwick Boseman as T'Challa / Black Panther, Angela Bassett as Ramonda, Danai Gurira as Okoye, Andy Serkis as Ulysses Klaue, Don Cheadle as James "Rhodey" Rhodes, Paul Bettany as J.A.R.V.I.S., John Kani as T'Chaka, Leslie Bibb as Christine Everhart, and Mick Wingert as Tony Stark
7	7	"What If... Thor Were an Only Child?"	Bryan Andrews	A. C. Bradley	September 22, 2021
After defeating the Frost Giants, Odin discovers the abandoned infant Loki and returns him to Laufey. Centuries later, Odin's only son Thor has become a boisterous, party-loving prince. While Odin sleeps and Frigga is away, Thor travels to Earth to host a large party with aliens from across the universe. His arrival attracts the attention of Jane Foster and Darcy Lewis, who join the party. As Thor and Foster grow close, acting S.H.I.E.L.D. director Maria Hill summons Carol Danvers to end the destruction caused by Thor's antics. Danvers is unable to defeat Thor without exerting her full power, so Lewis and Hill suggest she take the fight to a less populated area while Foster contacts Frigga with Heimdall's help. Hill readies a nuclear strike as Danvers and Thor begin to battle again, but Frigga contacts them and says she is coming. Thor and the party-goers clean up the mess before she arrives. Later, Thor asks Foster out on a date, but is interrupted by an army of drones led by Ultron, who possesses all six Infinity Stones. Cast: Chris Hemsworth as Thor, Natalie Portman as Jane Foster, Tom Hiddleston as Loki, Kat Dennings as Darcy Lewis, Samuel L. Jackson as Nick Fury, Jeff Goldblum as the Grandmaster, Cobie Smulders as Maria Hill, Clark Gregg as Phil Coulson, Frank Grillo as Brock Rumlow, Taika Waititi as Korg, Karen Gillan as Nebula, Jaimie Alexander as Sif, Seth Green as Howard the Duck, Alexandra Daniels as Carol Danvers / Captain Marvel, and Rachel House as Topaz
8	8	"What If... Ultron Won?"	Bryan Andrews	Matthew Chauncey	September 29, 2021
After taking the Mind Stone and assuming Vision's Vibranium body, Ultron defeats the Avengers and launches a global nuclear holocaust, killing most of humanity. When Thanos appears on Earth to complete the Infinity Gauntlet, Ultron bisects him and takes the rest of the Infinity Stones, using them to create a massive drone army to kill nearly all life in his universe. Ultron then hears the Watcher, discovers the existence of the multiverse, and attacks him. Meanwhile, Clint Barton and Natasha Romanoff survive Ultron's attacks and find a copy of Arnim Zola's mind in Siberia. They upload Zola into a drone body to try and destroy Ultron's hive mind, but it fails because Ultron has left their universe. Barton sacrifices himself to help Romanoff and Zola to escape from several Ultron drones. Ultron battles the Watcher across different universes and defeats him. The Watcher flees to Strange Supreme's universe to ask him for help while Ultron plans to conquer the multiverse. Cast: Jeremy Renner as Clint Barton / Hawkeye, Lake Bell as Natasha Romanoff / Black Widow, Toby Jones as Arnim Zola, Ross Marquand as Ultron and the Sub-Ultron Sentries, Josh Keaton as Steve Rogers / Captain America, Mick Wingert as Tony Stark / Iron Man, Alexandra Daniels as Carol Danvers / Captain Marvel, and Benedict Cumberbatch as Doctor Strange Supreme
9	9	"What If... the Watcher Broke His Oath?"	Bryan Andrews	A. C. Bradley	October 6, 2021
The Watcher recruits Strange Supreme, Captain Carter, Star-Lord T'Challa, "Party" Thor, Black Panther Killmonger, and a variant of Gamora who killed Thanos (Note: The episode featuring this variant of Gamora, "What If... Iron Man Crashed into the Grandmaster?", was planned to be a part of the first season, but was delayed to the second season due to COVID-19-related production issues.) from their respective universes to battle Ultron, dubbing them the "Guardians of the Multiverse". In Ultron's home universe, the Guardians encounter Natasha Romanoff who, with Carter's help, shoots Ultron with an arrow containing Arnim Zola's mind. Zola destroys Ultron from within, takes control of his body, and fights Killmonger, who betrays the Guardians while attempting to claim Ultron's Infinity Stones for himself. As the pair struggle over the Stones, Strange and the Watcher seal them in a pocket dimension, which Strange agrees to watch over. The Watcher returns Carter, T'Challa, Gamora, and Thor to their respective universes. Romanoff refuses to return to hers, so the Watcher brings her to one in which the Avengers candidates were assassinated, (Note: This is the universe featured in "What If... the World Lost Its Mightiest Heroes?".) where she helps to defeat Loki. In a mid-credits scene, Carter and her universe's Romanoff discover the Hydra Stomper armor with someone inside. Cast: Hayley Atwell as Peggy Carter / Captain Carter, Lake Bell as Natasha Romanoff / Black Widow, Frank Grillo as Brock Rumlow, Georges St-Pierre as Georges Batroc, Chadwick Boseman as Star-Lord T'Challa, Michael B. Jordan as N'Jadaka / Erik "Killmonger" Stevens, Chris Hemsworth as Thor, Benedict Cumberbatch as Doctor Strange Supreme, Toby Jones as Arnim Zola, Tom Hiddleston as Loki, Kurt Russell as Ego, Samuel L. Jackson as Nick Fury, and Mick Wingert as Tony Stark / Iron Man

== Cast and characters ==
The series is narrated by Jeffrey Wright as the Watcher, a member of the alien Watcher race who observes the multiverse. Each episode features different versions of characters from the MCU films, with many actors reprising their roles for the series. The final two episodes bring together characters from earlier episodes to form the "Guardians of the Multiverse", including Benedict Cumberbatch as Doctor Strange Supreme, Hayley Atwell as Peggy Carter / Captain Carter, Lake Bell as Natasha Romanoff / Black Widow, Chadwick Boseman as Star-Lord T'Challa, Michael B. Jordan as Killmonger, and Chris Hemsworth as Thor. Other new versions of characters who also return for the finale include Kurt Russell's Ego and Brian T. Delaney's Peter Quill from the second episode, Tom Hiddleston's Loki and Samuel L. Jackson's Nick Fury from the third, Ozioma Akagha's Shuri from the sixth, and Toby Jones's Arnim Zola and Ross Marquand's Ultron from the eighth. Additionally, Cynthia McWilliams and Mick Wingert appear as versions of Gamora and Tony Stark, respectively, from an episode that was cut from the first season and was released in the second as "What If... Iron Man Crashed into the Grandmaster?".

== Production ==
=== Development ===
By September 2018, Marvel Studios was developing several series for its parent company Disney's streaming service, Disney+. One of these was an animated series based on the Marvel Comics run What If...?. The anthology series, which would be produced by Marvel Studios president Kevin Feige, would explore how the MCU would be altered if certain events had occurred differently. Head writer A. C. Bradley joined in October 2018, after Marvel Studios was impressed that some of her pitch ideas matched with concepts they were planning for films. Director Bryan Andrews met with Brad Winderbaum, the Marvel Studios executive in charge of the series, as early as 2018; both Bradley and Andrews were officially announced in their roles in August 2019.

In April 2019, Disney and Marvel officially announced the series. Winderbaum said it was not a coincidence that the series was set for release so soon after the first season finale of Loki, which introduced the multiverse, since What If...? explores facets of the multiverse in a way that Winderbaum believed made the series as important as any other MCU property; Bradley confirmed that all episodes of the series are canon to the MCU multiverse, with most of the episodes taking place in their own universe. Since work began on What If...? before the development of Loki and Doctor Strange in the Multiverse of Madness, Bradley was unsure how those projects would be exploring and explaining the MCU version of the multiverse. She chose to focus on the possibilities within the alternate timelines of the multiverse, which she described as a "sampler of assorted chocolates", and left elements such as the Time Variance Authority to be explained by those other projects. Feige and Winderbaum kept the creative teams of Loki and Multiverse of Madness informed of what was happening in What If...? as work on those projects began. The creative team of What If...? met with Loki executive producers Stephen Broussard and Kevin Wright as well as WandaVision (2021) co-executive producer Mary Livanos to establish a "rule book" regarding the multiverse, its branch timelines, and nexus events.

Executive producers for the season include Winderbaum, Feige, Louis D'Esposito, Victoria Alonso, Andrews, and Bradley, with Carrie Wassenaar producing. In December 2019, Feige revealed that the first season would consist of 10 episodes. However, because of the production delays caused by the COVID-19 pandemic, the tenth episode of the first season was not completed in time and moved to the second season. The episodes are approximately 30 minutes in length.

=== Writing ===
Feige explained with the series' announcement that it would take "pivotal moments" from throughout the MCU and change them. For example, the first episode features Peggy Carter taking the Super Soldier Serum instead of Steve Rogers. The writers were initially unsure if they could use Spider-Man in the series due to Sony Pictures owning the character's live-action film rights, but they were ultimately allowed to. Before considering "what if" scenarios, the writers examined all of the MCU heroes to determine "what makes them tick". They wanted to ensure that there was story potential beyond the inciting "what if" change of each episode, so they could use the different scenarios to explore "the hero behind the shield". Bradley described the series' balance between character examination and action as "Die Hard (1988) meets Wes Anderson". 30 potential episodes were conceived and written by Bradley, Andrews, Winderbaum, story editor Matthew Chauncey, junior executive Simona Paparelli, and script coordinator Ryan Little. The What If...? comics provided inspiration for potential story points, as did the Ultimate Marvel comic book imprint (which told alternate stories to the main Marvel universe) since it was an example of a fully realized alternate universe. Bradley first created simple scenarios out of concern for the series' budget, but was told by Marvel to "go nuts". Feige chose his favorite concepts from the 30 options, which were then narrowed down to the 10 episodes for the first season. After each episode was incorrectly rumored to focus on one film from the Infinity Saga, Bradley clarified that multiple films and characters would be represented in each episode and most of the characters from all the films would appear throughout the season. Winderbaum hoped the episodes would intrigue viewers to revisit the original films, like how reading a What If comic could lead a reader to the original comic story.

Each episode and its alternate storyline is introduced and concluded by the Watcher, presenting it as "a cautionary tale in the spirit of The Twilight Zone (1959–1964)". The episode's tones vary, with some being darker or lighter than the MCU films that they play off. For example, one episode is a political thriller, the episode centered on Stephen Strange is a "dark... tragic love story", and another allowed Bradley to "goof off" and draw inspiration from films she enjoyed when growing up such as Can't Hardly Wait (1998) and the National Lampoon films. What If...? also has a horror, a heist, and a murder mystery episodes. Various films served as touchstones for each episode, such as 1940s serials and war films for the Peggy Carter episode. Some of the writers' concepts were rejected because they matched with story ideas that Marvel already planned to use, such as Professor Hulk, an older Steve Rogers, and Pepper Potts in the Rescue suit, who all appear in Avengers: Endgame (2019); Loki becoming a hero as he does in Loki; Jane Foster becoming Thor, which was planned for Thor: Love and Thunder (2022); and an episode that was "half the [planned] plot" of Guardians of the Galaxy Vol. 3 (2023). Other unused pitches include an episode where Spider-Man turns into a real spider that was deemed "too dark and too body horror" for Marvel's target PG-13/TV-14 rating; a Jurassic Park (1993)-inspired episode featuring the Avengers as dinosaurs during prehistory; and a crossover with Star Wars characters like Luke Skywalker.

Despite the series' anthology format, the writers conceived a story device for the first season that allowed them to have some connectivity between the episodes; this begins to be revealed in the season's eighth episode before the finale in the ninth. Additionally, after the Watcher begins the season distant and appearing in the background, he becomes more apparent as the season progresses. Bradley likened the character to the audience, since "as he suffers [the heroes'] triumphs and their tragedies, he becomes also more emotionally invested, and therefore becomes more and more part of their world and wants to be more part of their world even though he knows he's not supposed to". Each episode also ends with a twist or question that could potentially be resolved in a sequel episode, similar to the MCU films' post-credit scenes, though these endings are also a reference to the twist endings of the What If...? comics that were not always resolved. Bradley called these endings "fun" while differentiating them from post-credit teasers which she considered "a promise". Many of the endings for the first season's episodes are resolved in the final episode of the season. Regarding the dark tones and tragic plot points of the first season, Bradley explained that being able to feature things that would never happen in the live-action MCU, such as killing off heroes, was the "most liberating part" of the series, and that some of the episodes ended in tragedy for reasons tied into the first season's overall plan. As the writers were developing the scripts, they realized that Captain Carter would "bubble up and became more important" alongside the Watcher, and decided to revisit her story in each future season. Bradley was asked to only explore "what if" concepts for existing MCU stories, so Phase Four characters do not appear until the second season.

=== Casting and voice recording ===
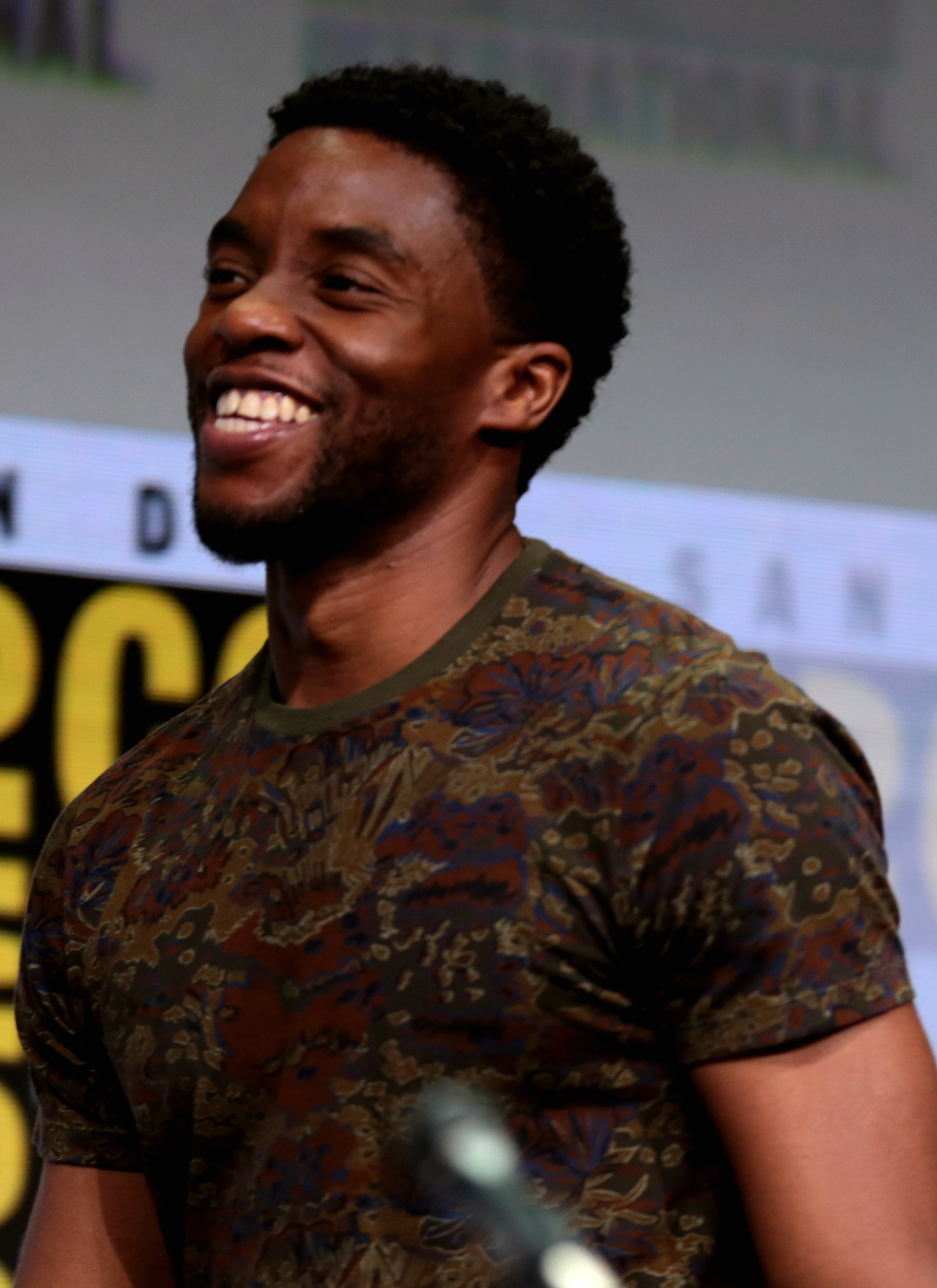
Chadwick Boseman is one of the many MCU actors reprising their roles in the season, with the season being his final role.

Marvel's plan for the series was to have actors who portray characters in the MCU films reprise their roles in What If...?, with more than 50 doing so. Feige revealed half of these actors at San Diego Comic-Con in July 2019: Michael B. Jordan as Erik "Killmonger" Stevens, Sebastian Stan as James "Bucky" Barnes, Josh Brolin as Thanos, Mark Ruffalo as Bruce Banner / Hulk, Tom Hiddleston as Loki, Samuel L. Jackson as Nick Fury, Chris Hemsworth as Thor, Hayley Atwell as Peggy Carter / Captain Carter, Chadwick Boseman as Star-Lord T'Challa, Karen Gillan as Nebula, Jeremy Renner as Clint Barton, Paul Rudd as Scott Lang, Michael Douglas as Hank Pym / Yellowjacket, Neal McDonough as Dum Dum Dugan, Dominic Cooper as Howard Stark, Sean Gunn as Kraglin Obfonteri, Natalie Portman as Jane Foster, David Dastmalchian as Kurt, Stanley Tucci as Abraham Erskine, Taika Waititi as Korg, Toby Jones as Arnim Zola, Djimon Hounsou as Korath the Pursuer, Jeff Goldblum as the Grandmaster, Michael Rooker as Yondu Udonta, and Chris Sullivan as Taserface. Feige also announced that Jeffrey Wright had been cast as the Watcher, who narrates the series. Boseman was one of the first actors to agree to appear in the series.

Voice recording began by August 2019 and continued into early 2020, taking place remotely when on-site work at the Walt Disney Studios lot was suspended during the COVID-19 pandemic. Wright did some recording in a make-shift recording studio at his home. In January 2021, Frank Grillo revealed that he had worked on the series, reprising his role of Brock Rumlow. By July, Seth Green was revealed to be reprising his role as Howard the Duck, as was Andy Serkis as Ulysses Klaue.

Ahead of the series' premiere, additional actors were revealed to be reprising their roles in the series, including Angela Bassett as Ramonda, Benedict Cumberbatch as Dr. Stephen Strange and Doctor Strange Supreme, Benedict Wong as Wong, Benicio del Toro as Taneleer Tivan / The Collector, Bradley Whitford as John Flynn, Carrie Coon as Proxima Midnight, Clancy Brown as Surtur, Clark Gregg as Phil Coulson, Cobie Smulders as Maria Hill, Danai Gurira as Okoye, Don Cheadle as James Rhodes, Emily VanCamp as Sharon Carter, Evangeline Lilly as Hope van Dyne, Georges St-Pierre as Georges Batroc, Jaimie Alexander as Sif, John Kani as T'Chaka, Jon Favreau as Harold "Happy" Hogan / Zombie Happy, Kat Dennings as Darcy Lewis, Kurt Russell as Ego, Leslie Bibb as Christine Everhart, Ophelia Lovibond as Carina, Paul Bettany as Vision and J.A.R.V.I.S., Rachel House as Topaz, Rachel McAdams as Christine Palmer, Tilda Swinton as the Ancient One, and Tom Vaughan-Lawlor as Ebony Maw.

In July 2021, Variety reported that several characters, such as Tony Stark, Steve Rogers, and Carol Danvers, would be voiced by different actors than those who portrayed them in MCU films. Winderbaum attributed some of the replacements to scheduling conflicts with the original actors, and explained that the creatives did not want the series to be "defined by the actors we thought we could get". When casting replacements, they looked to prioritize the performance for this series over an actor sounding the same as the original. He felt the series' exploration of the multiverse gave a "cerebral justification" for the different actors. Dave Bautista, who portrays Drax in the films, indicated that he was not asked by Marvel to be a part of the series, despite the character's inclusion. Winderbaum expressed surprise at Bautista's claims, assuming that there was some miscommunication at some point as all MCU actors were asked through their agents or directly to participate in the series. Josh Keaton voices Skinny Steve Rogers / Hydra Stomper and Steve Rogers; Ross Marquand voices Johann Schmidt / Red Skull (Note: Marquand reprises his role as Johann Schmidt / Red Skull from Avengers: Infinity War (2018) and Avengers: Endgame (2019), replacing original actor Hugo Weaving.) and Ultron; Fred Tatasciore voices Drax, Corvus Glaive, and Volstagg; Brian T. Delaney voices Peter Quill; Lake Bell voices Natasha Romanoff / Black Widow; Mick Wingert voices Tony Stark / Iron Man; Stephanie Panisello voices Betty Ross; Mike McGill voices Thaddeus Ross; Alexandra Daniels voices Carol Danvers / Captain Marvel; Hudson Thames voices Peter Parker / Spider-Man; Kiff VandenHeuvel voices Obadiah Stane; Beth Hoyt voices Pepper Potts; Ozioma Akagha voices Shuri; Josette Eales voices Frigga; David Chen voices Hogun; Max Mittelman voices Fandral; and Cynthia McWilliams voices Gamora.

=== Animation ===
Stephan Franck serves as head of animation on the series, which features a cel-shaded animation style with character likenesses based on the actors from the films. Blue Spirit worked on two of the first season's episodes, with Squeeze handling animation for four episodes, Flying Bark Productions working on four, and Stellar Creative Lab working on one. The animation style is consistent across these episodes, with Bradley noting that Marvel was "trying to use the color palette, the lighting, [and] the character design to tell as much story as you can" like they do in live-action films, adjusting the camera and color palettes between each episode. Production Designer Paul Lasaine and his team painted all of the backgrounds for the season, basing these on frames from the films as well as the concept art and set plans from those productions. Discussing the apparent exaggeration of action and abilities in the series, Franck said they were trying to be consistent with what is seen in the films, but "every medium has its own poetry and reads differently, and there's a level of abstraction and exaggeration that is inherent to animation". Graham Fisher and Joel Fisher edit the series, starting during the storyboard phase.

=== Music ===
Soundtrack albums for each episode, featuring composer Laura Karpman's score, were released digitally by Marvel Music and Hollywood Records. The first episode's album was released on August 13, with subsequent albums releasing shortly after their corresponding episode.

== Marketing ==
Footage from the series' first episode was shown during the D23 2019, with footage from the series also included in Expanding the Universe, a Marvel Studios special that debuted on Disney+ on November 12. The first trailer was released in December 2020. Based on the trailer, io9's James Whitbrook felt the series was "looking great". Chris Evangelista at /Film also thought it looked "pretty damn cool" and felt What If...? was a good "excuse to essentially blow up the MCU as we know it and tell completely new, weirder stories that would never get their own feature films". Writing for Polygon, Petrana Radulovic felt the trailer showed "the full extent of [narrative] possibilities". An extended look at the first episode of the series was shown during the Women In Animation panel at the Annecy International Animation Film Festival in June 2021. Also in the month, Hyundai Motor Company partnered with Marvel Studios for a marketing campaign to promote the Hyundai Tucson along with What If...?, WandaVision, The Falcon and the Winter Soldier, and Loki. The commercials were produced by Marvel and were meant to tell an "in-world" story set within the narrative of the series. The What If...? commercial was released in August 2021, which saw Party Thor driving the Hyundai Tucson into a battle against Ultron's robots with Captain Carter, Star-Lord T'Challa, and Doctor Strange Supreme. Adam Bentz at Screen Rant felt Hyundai's "Question Everything" campaign was the perfect match for What If...? and its concept, and added the content of the commercial likely was not a spoiler for the series, since the ads for the other MCU series did not correlate with actual plot lines. Barney Goldberg, executive creative director of Innocean, the creative agency working with Hyundai, noted there was "an incredible amount of coordination" to get the ad released at the proper time, in order for them to be relevant and not too late, while not spoiling aspects of the series.

An official trailer and poster for the first season were released on July 8, 2021. Nick Romano of Entertainment Weekly felt they provided more insight into the various "what if" stories the series would be exploring, and said it would be "one to watch" along with MCU films that explore the multiverse like Spider-Man: No Way Home (2021) and Doctor Strange in the Multiverse of Madness (2022). Chaim Gartenberg at The Verge called the trailer "the best look yet" at the series. Writing for Screen Rant, Rachel Labonte said the trailer was a "wild ride" and felt like "almost every MCU character imaginable is glimpsed for at least a few seconds... it's clear there are a lot of exciting stories ahead". Vanessa Armstrong of /Film said she was not a fan of animation, but, after seeing the trailer, believed What If...? would "convert a lot of folks [like her] who are resistant" to the medium. Armstrong was "excited to see how these different realities play out" and noted the impressive amount of content and questions that were posed in the trailer. Three episodes of the series Marvel Studios: Legends were released on August 4, exploring Peggy Carter, the Avengers Initiative, and the Ravagers using footage from their MCU film appearances.

In January 2021, Marvel announced their "Marvel Must Haves" program, which reveals new toys, games, books, apparel, home decor, and other merchandise related to each episode of What If...? following an episode's release. In July, Funko Pops, Lego sets, and Marvel Legends figures based on the series were revealed. The "Must Haves" merchandise for the episodes began on August 13, 2021.

== Release ==
The first season debuted on Disney+ on August 11, 2021, and consists of nine episodes which were released weekly until October 6. It is part of Phase Four of the MCU.

== Reception ==
=== Critical response ===
What If...? season 1: Critical reception by episode
Percentage of positive critics' reviews tracked by the website Rotten Tomatoes

The review aggregator website Rotten Tomatoes reports a 94% approval rating with an average rating of 7.90/10, based on 104 reviews for the first season. The site's critical consensus reads: "What If...? may not add much to the larger MCU narrative, but surprising takes on beloved characters and some of the best action sequences in the entire franchise make for engaging viewing." Metacritic, which uses a weighted average, assigned the first season a score of 69 out of 100 based on 16 critics, indicating "generally favorable reviews".

Liz Shannon Miller at Collider, reviewing the first three episodes, felt the series lived up to the promise of showing "totally fresh but familiar spins" on the MCU. Regarding the animation, though Miller felt at times it "lacks depth" and wished varying styles were used to fit each story being told, the action sequences were "beautifully executed, with an extra bit of comic book flare to heighten the reality of the show, enhancing the whole aesthetic". For Miller, while some of the returning voice actors were not able to capture "the essence of their characters" as well as others, simply having them return enhanced the series, with praise also going to the new actors voicing established characters and noting Wright was a "pitch-perfect" casting as the Watcher. She concluded that What If...? was "seriously an MCU superfan's dream at times, though once you get past the initial discovery of each short's "What if...", it's sometimes hard to stay invested". Giving the first three episodes 3.5 out of 5 stars, Alan Sepinwall of Rolling Stone said the series was "uneven in the way almost any anthology series is. It's fun simply because the level of quality control at Marvel is pretty high these days... and because some of the ideas are either inherently appealing or are used to cleverly tweak what we know from the films. But not every installment lives up to the title's seemingly limitless potential." In his review of the first three episodes, Tyler Hersko from IndieWire felt the series was a "paradox" since it was both "the most Marvel Cinematic Universe title yet" while also "the first MCU installment in years that doesn't feel burdened by the need to meticulously fit into the franchise's canon or blatantly tease future installments". He called this "a breath of fresh air", with What If...? "offer[ing] the fans exactly what they want while still clinging to a few surprises", presenting plenty of in-universe references and jokes for long time fans, while still creating standalone stories that could appeal to all viewers. Hersko called the animation "an absolute pleasure to witness in motion", and gave the episodes a "B+".

The Hollywood Reporter's Angie Han believed "for a series set in the infinite vastness of a multiverse, What If...? is dreaming awfully small", with some "what if" concepts were not as compelling as others. She added that Wright gave each episode "a boost of gravitas", but noted the animation was awkward at times, with some scenes approaching the uncanny valley and that some of the returning actors gave "robotic" voice performances without the charisma of their live-action portrayals. She concluded, "Dare to hope for more than superficial amusement, though, and What If...? tends to disappoint... It's possible future episodes will do a better job of balancing big concepts with a half-hour run time, or that the season is building to some grander design. If that's the case, What If...? is taking its sweet time showing what it can do." Etan Anderson of /Film called the results of the first three episodes "mixed" with "some glaring shortcomings", such as the "clunky" animation when it was not showing action sequences, the voice acting from some of the returning stars, and the short run times which did not allow enough time for viewers to "fully engage" with these new versions of characters. Anderson added that some of the humor struggled and felt "awkwardly contrived" and believed "the creators seem to be trying too hard to keep the secrets of the series instead of being more forthcoming about the exciting twists and turns within". He concluded that this appeared to be the first Marvel Studios series that might not be "necessary viewing" and one that could be "an uphill battle" for general audiences to continue watching, though dedicated fans would find What If...? to be "a satisfying remix". Following the release of the first season, Adam B. Vary of Variety said the season had been "a fascinating experiment for Marvel Studios", with "fizzy adventures... [that] also leaned into real darkness".

=== Accolades ===
Award	Date(s) of ceremony	Category	Recipient(s)	Result	Ref.
American Cinema Editors Eddie Awards	March 5, 2022	Best Edited Animation (Non-Theatrical)	Graham Fisher and Joel Fisher (for "What If... Ultron Won?")	Nominated	
Annie Awards	March 12, 2022	Outstanding Achievement for Editorial in an Animated Television/Broadcast Production	Joel Fisher, Graham Fisher, Sharia Davis, Basuki Juwono, and Adam Spieckerman (for "What If... Ultron Won?")	Won	
Critics' Choice Television Awards	March 13, 2022	Best Animated Series	What If...?	Won	
Golden Reel Awards	March 13, 2022	Outstanding Achievement in Sound Editing – Non-Theatrical Animation	Mac Smith, Bill Rudolph, Alyssa Nevarez, Cheryl Nardi, Anele Onyekwere, Tom Kramer, John Roesch, and Shelley Roden (for "What If... Doctor Strange Lost His Heart Instead of His Hands?")	Nominated	
Hollywood Critics Association TV Awards	August 14, 2022	Best Streaming Animated Series or TV Movie	What If...?	Nominated	
Dorian Awards	August 17, 2022	Best Animated Show	What If...?	Nominated	
Primetime Creative Arts Emmy Awards	September 3–4, 2022	Outstanding Animated Program	"What If... Doctor Strange Lost His Heart Instead of His Hands?"	Nominated	
Primetime Creative Arts Emmy Awards	September 3–4, 2022	Outstanding Character Voice-Over Performance	Chadwick Boseman (for "What If... T'Challa Became a Star-Lord?")	Won	
Primetime Creative Arts Emmy Awards	September 3–4, 2022	Outstanding Character Voice-Over Performance	Jeffrey Wright (for "What If... Ultron Won?")	Nominated	
Golden Trailer Awards	October 7, 2022	Most Innovative Advertising for a TV/Streaming Series	What If...?	Nominated	
Saturn Awards	October 25, 2022	Best Animated Series	What If...?	Nominated	

== Documentary special ==
In February 2021, the documentary series Marvel Studios: Assembled was announced. The special on this series, Assembled: The Making of What If...?, goes behind the scenes of the making of the series, and was released on Disney+ on October 27, 2021.
