= What If... T'Challa Became a Star-Lord? =

- What If...? episode
- Promotional poster
- Episode no.: Season 1 Episode 2
- Directed by: Bryan Andrews
- Written by: Matthew Chauncey
- Editing by: Graham Fisher
- Original release date: August 18, 2021
- Running time: 32 minutes

Cast
- Chadwick Boseman as Star-Lord T'Challa; Karen Gillan as Nebula; Michael Rooker as Yondu Udonta; Djimon Hounsou as Korath the Pursuer; John Kani as T'Chaka; Josh Brolin as Thanos; Benicio del Toro as Taneleer Tivan / The Collector; Kurt Russell as Ego; Sean Gunn as Kraglin Obfonteri; Chris Sullivan as Taserface; Seth Green as Howard the Duck; Danai Gurira as Okoye; Ophelia Lovibond as Carina; Carrie Coon as Proxima Midnight; Tom Vaughan-Lawlor as Ebony Maw; Fred Tatasciore as Drax and Corvus Glaive; Maddix Robinson as young T'Challa; Brian T. Delaney as Peter Quill

Episode chronology
← Previous "What If... Captain Carter Were the First Avenger?"	Next → "What If... the World Lost Its Mightiest Heroes?"
- What If...? season 1

"What If... T'Challa Became a Star-Lord?" is the second episode of the first season of the American animated television series What If...?, based on the Marvel Comics series of the same name. It explores what would happen if the events of the Marvel Cinematic Universe (MCU) films Guardians of the Galaxy (2014) and Black Panther (2018) occurred differently, with Yondu Udonta and the Ravagers abducting a young T'Challa instead of Peter Quill. The episode was written by story editor Matthew Chauncey and directed by Bryan Andrews.

Jeffrey Wright narrates the series as the Watcher, with this episode also starring the voices of Chadwick Boseman (T'Challa), Michael Rooker (Udonta), Josh Brolin, Benicio del Toro, Kurt Russell, Ophelia Lovibond, Carrie Coon, Tom Vaughan-Lawlor, Karen Gillan, Djimon Hounsou, John Kani, Sean Gunn, Chris Sullivan, Seth Green, and Danai Gurira. The series began development by September 2018, with Andrews joining soon after, and many actors expected to reprise their roles from the MCU films. Animation for the episode was provided by Blue Spirit, with Stephan Franck serving as head of animation. The episode shows the impact T'Challa would have across the galaxy, and is dedicated to Boseman, who died in August 2020.

"What If... T'Challa Became a Star-Lord?" was released on Disney+ on August 18, 2021. Critics found the episode to be an improvement over the series premiere, praising its premise, heist plot, and the changes made to existing MCU characters such as Brolin's reformed Thanos. The performances of Boseman, Hounsou, and Brolin also received praise, with Boseman posthumously winning a Primetime Emmy Award for his performance.

== Plot ==
In 1988, the Ravagers are hired by Ego, a Celestial, to retrieve his son Peter Quill from Earth. Ravager leader Yondu Udonta assigns this task to his underlings Kraglin Obfonteri and Taserface, (Note: This choice is when the story diverges from the events of the film Guardians of the Galaxy (2014).) who mistakenly abduct a young T'Challa from Wakanda.

20 years later, T'Challa has become a famous intergalactic pirate and hero known as Star-Lord, reformed the Ravagers using the Earth hero Robin Hood and his Merry Men as inspiration, and persuaded Thanos to abandon his plan of eliminating half of all life in the universe and join the Ravagers. He also believes that Udonta attempted to return him to Wakanda as a child, but it had been destroyed.

After obtaining an orb containing the Power Stone and recruiting Korath the Pursuer into the Ravagers, the group are approached by Thanos' adopted daughter Nebula, who proposes a heist to steal one of Taneleer Tivan / The Collector's artifacts: the Embers of Genesis, cosmic dust capable of terraforming ecosystems and eradicating galactic hunger. At Tivan's headquarters on Knowhere, the Ravagers distract his enforcers, the Black Order, while Nebula and Udonta offer him the orb, allowing T'Challa to infiltrate Tivan's vast collection for the Embers. Instead, he finds a Wakandan spacecraft sent in search of him, realizes that Udonta lied about Wakanda, and falls out with Udonta before Nebula seemingly betrays the Ravagers and has them captured.

T'Challa decries Tivan's practice of imprisoning others in his collection, which inspires Tivan's slave, Carina, to free T'Challa. Having obtained the Embers, Nebula frees the Ravagers and helps them defeat the Black Order while T'Challa and Udonta defeat Tivan and leave him at Carina and his captives' mercy.

T'Challa forgives Udonta for his deception before the Ravagers return to Earth so T'Challa can reunite with his family. Elsewhere on Earth, an older Quill is now working as a Dairy Queen janitor when Ego approaches him.

== Production ==
=== Development ===
External videos
- What If... T'Challa Became a Star-Lord? | Marvel Studios' What If...? | Disney+, a promotional video introducing the episode's "what if" concept with narration by Jeffrey Wright as the Watcher, video from the What If...? Twitter account

By September 2018, Marvel Studios was developing an animated anthology series based on the What If...? comic books, which would explore how the Marvel Cinematic Universe (MCU) films would be altered if certain events occurred differently. Director Bryan Andrews met Marvel Studios executive Brad Winderbaum about the project as early as 2018, and his involvement was announced in August 2019. Andrews and Winderbaum executive produce alongside head writer A. C. Bradley, Kevin Feige, Louis D'Esposito, and Victoria Alonso. Story editor Matthew Chauncey wrote the second episode, titled "What If... T'Challa Became a Star-Lord?", which features an alternate storyline of the films Guardians of the Galaxy (2014) and Black Panther (2018). The episode is dedicated to star Chadwick Boseman, who reprised his Black Panther role prior to his death in August 2020. "What If... T'Challa Became a Star-Lord?" was released on Disney+ on August 18, 2021.

=== Writing ===
The episode was written around January and February 2019. In the episode's alternate storyline, Yondu Udonta and the Ravagers abduct a young T'Challa instead of Peter Quill, with T'Challa becoming the hero Star-Lord. The writers had wanted to explore what it would be like if Yondu abducted a different child, and settled on T'Challa when they realized that he was the same age as Peter Quill. Boseman read early versions of the episode's script to ensure that they stayed true to T'Challa's character, since he is a role model and hero to younger viewers. Guardians of the Galaxy director James Gunn also gave notes on the script, especially for how it used the Ravagers, while Black Panther writer and director Ryan Coogler and executive producer Nate Moore were shown the script to ensure it was a faithful adaption of T'Challa and his world. The episode is inspired by heist films, with Bradley taking specific influence for the episode's tone from the film Ocean's Eleven (2001); but the episode became slightly more serious following Boseman's death.

Boseman felt the episode allowed T'Challa to have "more of a wink and a smile" without the pressure of being king, but still retained his "moral compass". Bradley described T'Challa as a character who changes his environment rather than having a character arc himself, saying, "He doesn't go through a transformation, he transforms the world". The writers therefore wanted to see how T'Challa could "transform outer space", and decided that he would become a Robin Hood-like figure who is "creating the best world for people, creating the best life" while still being true to who he is. The episode explores the "ripple effect" that this has across the galaxy, resulting in changes from the MCU films such as the Guardians of the Galaxy never forming; the Ravagers becoming a "more noble, straight-laced operation"; and the supervillain Thanos being reformed and joining the Ravagers. The writers initially avoided addressing Thanos in the episode, but added him when they realized that he could be a good example to show the differences in this universe caused by T'Challa. A running joke throughout the episode is that Thanos still believes his plan to eliminate half the universe would have worked. This change to Thanos created the "power vacuum" that allows Taneleer Tivan / The Collector to become a supervillain, and also allows Thanos' adopted daughter Nebula to be portrayed as better-adjusted. The writers chose to hint at a relationship between Nebula and T'Challa because they did not feel Gamora would be a good romantic fit for T'Challa as she was for Quill in the Guardians of the Galaxy films. This gives Nebula a femme fatale/Tess Ocean-type role in the episode, with this version of the character marketed as "Heist Nebula".

=== Casting and voice recording ===
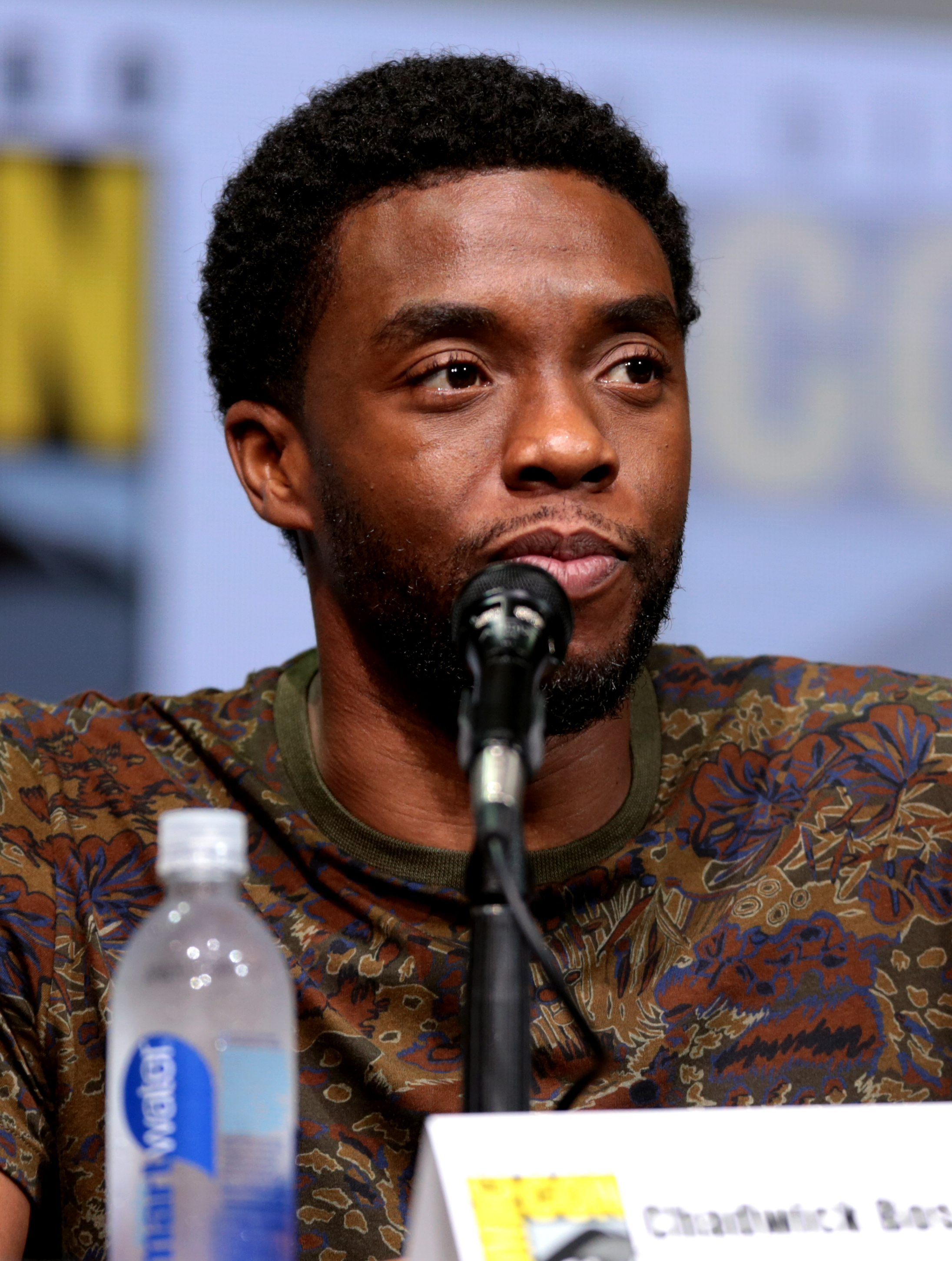
The episode is dedicated to Chadwick Boseman, who stars as Star-Lord T'Challa and died in August 2020

Jeffrey Wright narrates the episode as the Watcher, with Marvel planning to have other characters in the series voiced by the actors who portrayed them in the MCU films. This episode stars Black Panther's Chadwick Boseman as Star-Lord T'Challa, with Maddix Robinson voicing a young version of the character. Black Panther stars Danai Gurira and John Kani also reprise their roles for the episode, as Okoye and T'Chaka, respectively. Returning from Guardians of the Galaxy are Michael Rooker as Yondu Udonta, Josh Brolin as Thanos, Benicio del Toro as Taneleer Tivan / The Collector, Ophelia Lovibond as Carina, Karen Gillan as Nebula, Djimon Hounsou as Korath the Pursuer, Sean Gunn as Kraglin Obfonteri, and Seth Green as Howard the Duck. Green, a fan of the original What If...? comics, recorded his lines prior to the release of Avengers: Endgame (2019). Chris Sullivan and Kurt Russell reprise their respective roles of Taserface and Ego from Guardians of the Galaxy Vol. 2 (2017), while Carrie Coon and Tom Vaughan-Lawlor reprise their roles from Avengers: Infinity War (2018) as Black Order members Proxima Midnight and Ebony Maw. MCU characters Ramonda, Shuri, Cull Obsidian, and Cosmo the Spacedog appear in non-speaking roles.

Fred Tatasciore voices both Drax and Corvus Glaive in the episode, replacing original actors Dave Bautista and Michael James Shaw, respectively. Bautista indicated that he was not asked by Marvel to be a part of the series, which surprised Winderbaum who assumed that there was some miscommunication at some point because he believed all MCU actors were asked, through their agents or directly, to participate in the series. Brian T. Delaney voices Peter Quill, replacing Chris Pratt, while Tanya Wheelock voices a female Ravager.

What If...? was Boseman's final performance. Andrews said Boseman approached the voice recording sessions "from a theatrically-trained actor's point of view", reading the scene descriptions between his lines to make it feel like a play. According to Andrews, Boseman enjoyed this version of the character because he was "the King without the mantle, the royalty and everything else that goes along with it". This allowed Boseman to bring a lighter approach and "jokey" feel to the performance. After this experience, Boseman had discussed incorporating elements of this "Gung ho" version of the character in Black Panther: Wakanda Forever (2022) with Feige and Coogler. A spin-off series centered on Star-Lord T'Challa had been in development but it was left in "limbo" after Boseman's death, with Andrews admitting ahead of the premiere of the What If...? spin-off series Marvel Zombies (2025) that Marvel Animation would have prioritized making the Star-Lord T'Challa series before Marvel Zombies had Boseman not died. Nebula flirtatiously calls T'Challa "Cha Cha" in the episode, which was an ad lib from Gillan that the creatives enjoyed and added to multiple scenes since that banter is a staple of the heist genre. Gunn also ad libbed a line that Bradley felt was the funniest of the episode, but it was ultimately cut. The episode's version of Thanos was jokingly referred to as "California Thanos" by the creatives due to Brolin's "mellow" approach to recording, as if he was "hanging out in boardshorts".

=== Animation ===
Animation for the episode was provided by Blue Spirit, with Stephan Franck serving as head of animation. Andrews developed the series' cel-shaded animation style with Ryan Meinerding, the head of visual development at Marvel Studios. Though the series has a consistent art style, elements such as the color palette differ between episodes; Meinerding stated that this episode has more of a science-fiction style compared to the previous episode. Concept art for the episode is included during the end credits, and was released online by Marvel following the episode's premiere.

To depict the "friendly" version of characters in the episode, such as Thanos, Meinerding wanted to differentiate them from their MCU counterparts using costume design, but also looked for ways to use different facial expressions. They wanted T'Challa's costume in the episode to be a "more sexy version of Peter Quill [with] cooler clothes and purple goggles", with production designer Paul Lasaine noting that T'Challa's influence on his environment is reflected by adding purple accents to the episode's backgrounds. Andrews wanted the Collector's Museum environment to be much larger than it is in Guardians of the Galaxy, where it is depicted as a single room filled with cases. In the episode there are multiple rooms, and there are some shots with so many cases in the background that it would be very difficult to create them all in a painted background with the correct perspectives. The production design team used different techniques to depict this, such as painting simple squares in a pattern or using computer-generated boxes instead. Lasaine felt these techniques worked well to create "an illustrated version [of the environment]. It's more of a symbolic version of a place rather than the place itself."

=== Music ===
External audio
- A Prince Goes Home (From "What If...T'Challa Became a Star-Lord?"/Audio Only) presents composer Laura Karpman's music for the dedication to Chadwick Boseman at the end of the episode, YouTube audio-only video from MarvelMusicVevo's channel

Composer Laura Karpman combined elements of existing MCU scores with original music for the series, specifically referencing elements of Tyler Bates's Guardians of the Galaxy score and Ludwig Göransson's Black Panther score for this episode. She combined these by taking the non-orchestral elements of Göransson's score, including electronic sounds and ethnic instruments and vocals, and mixing them with Bates' orchestral main Guardians of the Galaxy theme as well as original orchestral music for the episode. Karpman thought the two scores "strangely [work] together pretty darn well". Much of her original music for the episode is for the heist scenes, for which she wrote "groovy jazz" music inspired by Ocean's Eleven that she described as "a dance with picture". She also wrote "T'Challa cantina" music that took a lot of finessing to sound like a playlist that T'Challa might listen to.

A soundtrack for the episode was released digitally by Marvel Music and Hollywood Records on August 23, 2021, featuring Karpman's score. The last track, "A Prince Goes Home", is heard over the dedication to Boseman at the end of the episode. It combines new music for the sequence with Karpman's theme for the Watcher, and she hoped the audience would be moved by it. She additionally shared the track via Twitter on August 28, the anniversary of Boseman's death.

What If... T'Challa Became a Star-Lord? (Original Soundtrack)
No.	Title	Length
1.	"Explorer"	1:39
2.	"Use the Gun"	1:32
3.	"The Plan"	0:39
4.	"Alien Lounging"	1:29
5.	"Necklace"	0:53
6.	"Maniac"	0:59
7.	"The Soul"	0:43
8.	"Strategy"	1:24
9.	"Lockdown"	1:15
10.	"Just Like Me"	1:57
11.	"I Abhor Drama"	1:25
12.	"Prisoners Escape"	1:35
13.	"Not Crazy...Mad"	2:02
14.	"Eat This"	0:57
15.	"To the Skies"	0:43
16.	"Cocktails"	0:41
17.	"The Universe"	1:31
18.	"A Prince Goes Home"	1:03
Total length:		22:35

== Marketing ==
On August 19, 2021, Marvel released a promotional poster for the episode, featuring elements of T'Challa's Star-Lord and Wakandan design, as well as a quotation from the episode. Marvel also announced merchandise inspired by the episode as part of its weekly "Marvel Must Haves" promotion for each episode of the series, including apparel, accessories, Funko Pops, Marvel Legends, and Lego sets based on Star-Lord T'Challa and Heist Nebula.

== Reception ==
=== Audience viewership ===
According to Nielsen Media Research, who measure the number of minutes watched by United States audiences on television sets, What If...? was the ninth-most watched original series across streaming services for the week of August 16 to August 22, 2021, with 225 million minutes watched.

=== Critical response ===
The review aggregator website Rotten Tomatoes reported a 100% approval rating with an average score of 9.7/10 based on 5 reviews.

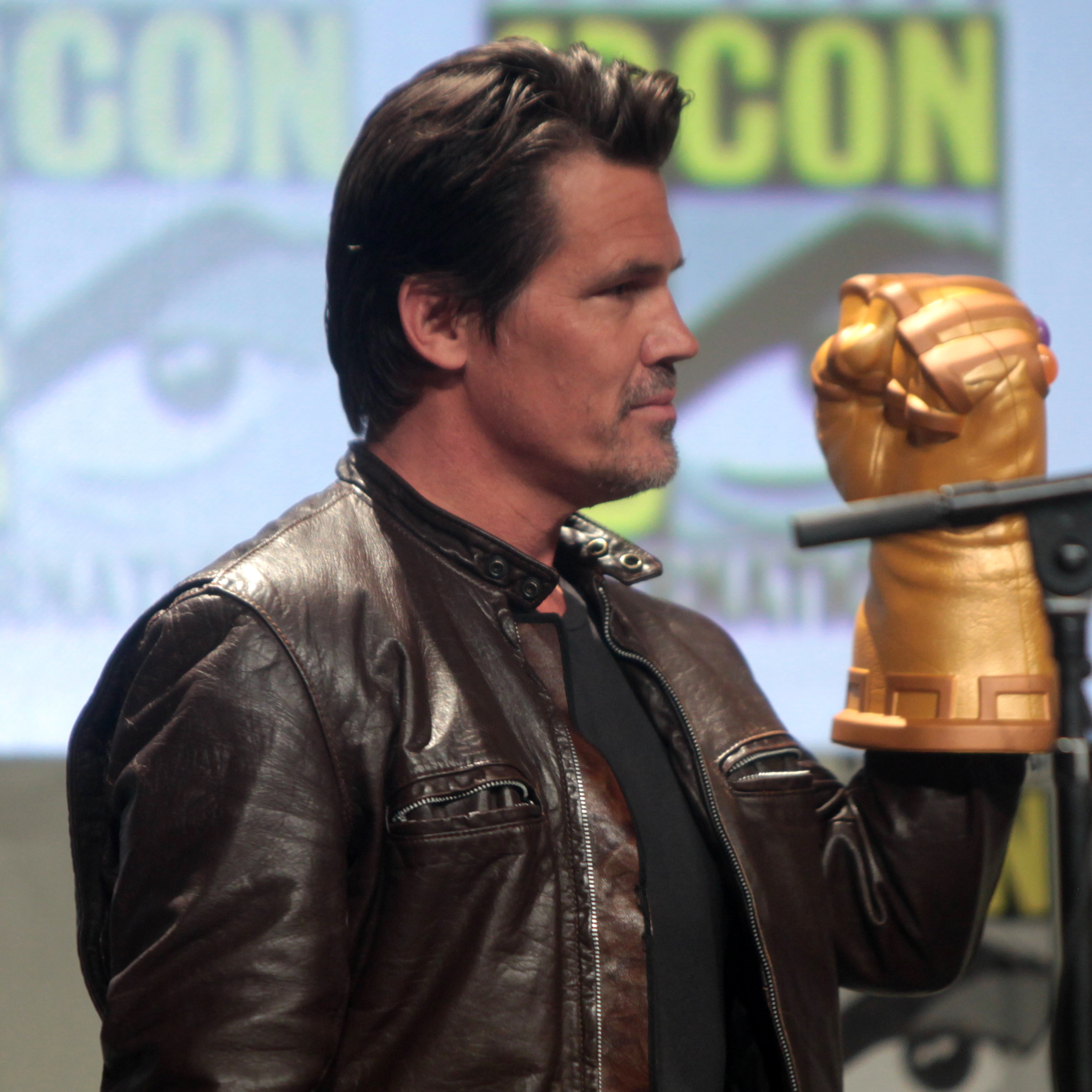
Josh Brolin's portrayal of Thanos in the episode was highlighted by critics

Angie Han of The Hollywood Reporter felt the episode "combines the goofiness of the Guardians of the Galaxy movies with the earnest heroism of Black Panther to delightful effect, and in the process allows Chadwick Boseman to voice a lighter, funnier version of his beloved character", adding that it was "easily the best" of the three episodes critics were given to review ahead of the series' release. She felt the episode was "worth the price of admission just to hear Nebula flirtatiously refer to T'Challa as 'Cha Cha'". Tom Jorgensen at IGN gave the episode an 8 out of 10 and described it as a "rollicking 30 minutes of [television]" that "goes for broke" with its changes to existing MCU characters. He found it to be a better fit for the series' format and style than the "surprisingly average" first episode of the series, and highlighted the "bold" choice to have one of this episode's changes be a reformed Thanos with "Big Dad Energy". Jorgensen praised Boseman's performance as an "absolute joy", but felt the other returning MCU actors had "mixed success" translating their performances to animation despite being better overall compared to the previous episode.

Writing for The A.V. Club, Sam Barsanti gave the episode a "B", finding it even more fun than the premise suggested with a heist sequence that "hit all of the main caper highlights". Barsanti did criticize the voice acting, including the performances of Boseman, Rooker, and Gillan, for missing a "spark" from their live-action versions, but he attributed this in-part to the series' animation style. He also gave Hounsou and Brolin as exceptions to this, feeling that Hounsou in particular deserved to get more voice acting and comedic work based on this performance. Giving the episode 3.5 out of 5 stars, Kirsten Howard of Den of Geek said the episode was consistently funny in showing how much better T'Challa is as Star-Lord than Peter Quill. She enjoyed this version of Thanos and seeing Howard the Duck, and felt it was "hard not to get choked up during the episode's final scene in Wakanda" knowing What If...? was Boseman's final performance. io9's Charlies Pulliam-Moore felt the episode "turns T'Challa into an interesting centerpiece for the larger universe to move around" and the character "becoming a humanitarian space pirate completely works on a character level, and lends itself to the episode's fast-paced heist story". Alan Sepinwall of Rolling Stone felt the episode took better advantage of the series' premise than the first episode, and also used Boseman's "underrated facility with light comedy" well, for its "well-executed" heist plot. Sepinwall said a lot of thought had been given to showing how the MCU's cosmic side would be altered by T'Challa, and particularly enjoyed the character's impact on Thanos.

=== Accolades ===
Boseman won Outstanding Character Voice-Over Performance at the 74th Primetime Creative Arts Emmy Awards.
