= Jane Foster (Marvel Cinematic Universe) =

Character in the Marvel Cinematic Universe

- Marvel Cinematic Universe character
- Jane Foster / Mighty Thor as portrayed by Natalie Portman in Thor: Love and Thunder
- First appearance: Thor (2011)
- Last appearance: Thor: Love and Thunder (2022)
- Based on: Jane Foster by: Stan Lee; Larry Lieber; Jack Kirby
- Adapted by: Ashley Miller; Zack Stentz; Don Payne; J. Michael Straczynski; Mark Protosevich
- Portrayed by: Natalie Portman

In-universe information
- Full name: Jane Foster
- Alias: Mighty Thor
- Title: Doctor
- Occupation: Astrophysicist; Consultant for S.H.I.E.L.D.
- Affiliation: S.H.I.E.L.D.; Kingdom of New Asgard
- Weapon: Mjolnir
- Significant other: Thor
- Nationality: American

Jane Foster is a fictional character in the film and television franchise Marvel Cinematic Universe (MCU) portrayed by Natalie Portman, based on the character of the same name from Marvel Comics created by Stan Lee, Larry Lieber, and Jack Kirby. Foster appears in Thor (2011), Thor: The Dark World (2013), and Thor: Love and Thunder (2022), where she becomes the Mighty Thor. Alternate versions of Foster appear in Avengers: Endgame (2019) and the animated television series What If...? (2021).

Although Portman's performance was praised, the character received mixed reception from the first two Thor films, though her portrayal in Thor: Love and Thunder as the Mighty Thor was better received and is considered by many to be one of the highlights of the film.

== Concept and creation ==
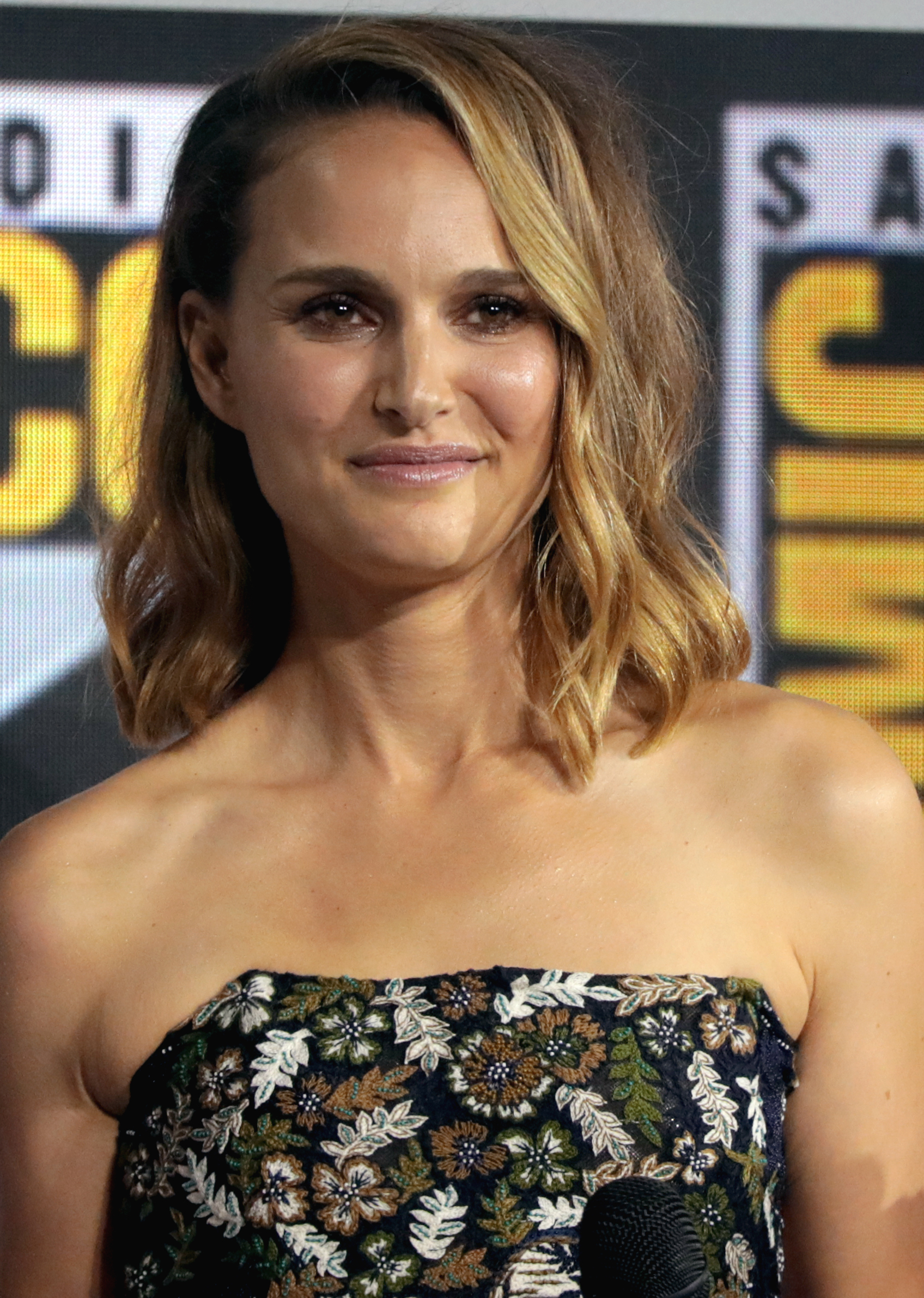
Natalie Portman at the 2019 San Diego Comic-Con

The comic book character, Jane Foster, first appeared in Journey into Mystery #84 (September 1962), and was created by plotter Stan Lee, scripter Larry Lieber and penciler Jack Kirby. Named "Jane Nelson" in her first two appearances, she went on to appear as the love interest of Dr. Donald Blake, the secret identity of the Norse god superhero Thor, in nearly every issue through #136 (Jan. 1967) of the title, by then renamed Thor.

Natalie Portman was cast as Foster in July 2009. When asked why she took the role for Thor, Portman replied, "I just thought it sounded like a weird idea because Kenneth Branagh's directing it, so I was just like, 'Kenneth Branagh doing Thor is super-weird, I've gotta do it.'" On October 13, 2011, Marvel confirmed that Portman would return to star in Thor: The Dark World. Her role as the character in Thor: Love and Thunder was confirmed in July 2019, as well as a storyline including her becoming the character Mighty Thor.

== Characterization ==
Portman stated that she really wanted to do a big effects film that emphasized character, and getting to do it with Branagh was a new way of approaching it, relative to Star Wars. Regarding her preparation for the role Portman remarked, "I signed on to do it before there was a script. And Ken, who's amazing, who is so incredible, was like, 'You can really help create this character'. I got to read all of these biographies of female scientists like Rosalind Franklin who actually discovered the DNA double helix but didn't get the credit for it. The struggles they had and the way that they thought – I was like, 'What a great opportunity, in a very big movie that is going to be seen by a lot of people, to have a woman as a scientist'. She's a very serious scientist. Because in the comic she's a nurse and now they made her an astrophysicist. Really, I know it sounds silly, but it is those little things that makes girls think it's possible. It doesn't give them a [role] model of 'Oh, I just have to dress cute in movies'".

Speaking to the character's role in Thor: The Dark World, producer Kevin Feige said, "[W]hile Thor was a fish out of water on Earth in the first two films (Thor and The Avengers), this time Jane is very much a fish out of water in Asgard." Portman added, "It was a whole different adventure this time. Because Jane is the fish out of water. I didn't want to make it like Bill & Ted, or like a valley girl dumped into Shakespeareland." Portman also said the film finds Jane at a different place in her life, "Jane has moved, so she's now in London, not in Santa Fe anymore. Obviously she has gone through missing Thor and also being upset at him because he didn't come knock on her door when he was on her planet. She's definitely been getting over that and trying to move on." Hemsworth's wife Elsa Pataky stood in for Portman during the post-credits kissing scene due to a scheduling conflict.

In Thor: Love and Thunder, Foster is undergoing cancer treatment while becoming the superhero the Mighty Thor, gaining a costume and powers similar to Thor's due to wielding a reconstructed version of his hammer Mjolnir. Portman, who did not appear in the previous film Thor: Ragnarok (2017), agreed to return after a meeting with director Taika Waititi, who said Foster's return to Thor's life after eight years would be a big adjustment for him since she has had another life without him. Waititi added that Foster showing up dressed like Thor would be a "real mindfuck" for him. In preparation for the role, Portman took the Mjolnir prop home to practice using it for her stunts.

== Appearances ==
- Portman's first appearance in the MCU was in Thor (2011).
- Portman reprises her role in Thor: The Dark World (2013).
- An alternate version of Foster appears in Avengers: Endgame (2019) and is set during the time of Thor: The Dark World.
- An alternate version of Foster is voiced by Natalie Portman in the episode "What If... Thor Were an Only Child?" from the Disney+ animated series, What If...? (2021).
- Foster appears in Thor: Love and Thunder (2022), once again portrayed by Portman. The character assumes the mantle of Mighty Thor while undergoing treatment for cancer and wielding a reconstructed version of the hammer Mjolnir.

== Fictional character biography ==
=== Meeting Thor ===
Astrophysicist Dr. Jane Foster, her assistant Darcy Lewis, and mentor Dr. Erik Selvig find the Asgardian Thor in New Mexico, where he has landed after being cast out of Asgard. Thor and Foster develop a mutual attraction, as Thor seeks his hammer. After Thor returns to Asgard to confront Loki, Foster and her team search for a way to open a portal to Asgard.

=== Contact with the Aether and relationship with Thor ===
In London, Foster and Lewis travel to an abandoned factory where portals to another dimension have appeared, disrupting the laws of physics around them. Separating from the group, Foster is teleported to another world, where, beyond Heimdall's near all-seeing vision, she absorbs the Aether. Heimdall alerts Thor, leading him to Earth. When Thor finds Foster, she inadvertently releases an unearthly force, and Thor returns with her to Asgard. Odin, recognizing the Aether, warns that the Aether will not only kill Foster but that its return heralds a catastrophic prophecy. Dark elf Malekith, awakened by the Aether's release, attacks Asgard. During the battle, Malekith and Algrim search for Foster, sensing that she contains the Aether. Thor's mother Frigga is fatally stabbed protecting Foster, and Malekith and Algrim are forced to flee without Foster. Despite Odin's orders not to leave Asgard, Thor reluctantly enlists the help of Loki, who knows of a secret portal to Svartalfheim, where they will use Foster to lure and confront Malekith, away from Asgard. In return, Thor promises Loki vengeance on Malekith for killing their mother. With Volstagg and Sif stalling Asgardian soldiers and Fandral assisting their escape, Thor, Loki, and Foster head to Svartalfheim. There, Loki tricks Malekith into drawing the Aether out of Foster, but Thor's attempt to destroy the exposed substance fails. Thor and Foster discover another portal in a nearby cave and reunite in London with Lewis and Foster's mentor Dr. Erik Selvig—who was briefly institutionalized due to the mental trauma he suffered during Loki's attack on Earth. They learn that Malekith plans to restore the Dark Elves to dominance by unleashing the Aether at the center of the Convergence in Greenwich. After Thor battles and defeats Malekith, Foster and Thor reunite on Earth.

They then return to New Mexico and establish a relationship there. However over time, Thor continues to work with the Avengers and Foster becomes busy with her studies. Eventually, in 2015, Foster breaks up with Thor.

In 2018 she disintegrates, but five years later is restored to life.

=== Cancer diagnosis and becoming the Mighty Thor ===
In 2023, Foster is diagnosed with terminal cancer. In 2024, she learns her medical treatment is proving ineffective and is encouraged by Lewis to seek help in New Asgard. She travels there hoping that Thor's hammer Mjolnir, which was previously destroyed by Hela, (Note: As depicted in Thor: Ragnarok (2017)) might heal her. Due to an enchantment Thor unknowingly placed on it years earlier to protect Foster, Mjolnir reforges and bonds itself to her. Thor, arriving in New Asgard to counter an attack by Gorr the God Butcher, is surprised to find Foster wielding Mjolnir, but nevertheless teams up with her, New Asgard's king Valkyrie, and Korg to fight Gorr. The group thwarts Gorr, but he escapes, kidnapping several Asgardian children and imprisoning them in the Shadow Realm.

The group travels to Omnipotence City, a realm that is home to many gods, to warn them and ask for their help. The leader of the gods, Zeus, fears Gorr and is unwilling to help, thinking they can remain safe and hidden from Gorr in the city. Zeus orders the group's capture to prevent them from exposing Omnipotence City's location to Gorr, but they fight Zeus's forces and escape. As the journey continues, Thor and Foster rekindle their romantic relationship and Foster reveals her illness. The group travels to the Shadow Realm to save the children. However, this turns out to be a trap for Gorr to take Thor's axe, Stormbreaker, in order to open the Bifrost and enter the realm of Eternity, who can grant his wish to destroy all gods.

=== Death ===
Drained of her strength each time she uses Mjolnir, Foster is warned that using it once more will likely kill her. Thor persuades Foster to let him fight Gorr alone while she recuperates. When Foster senses that Gorr is about to kill Thor, she makes the ultimate sacrifice in joining the battle with Mjolnir to save him. They destroy the Necrosword, but the three are brought into Eternity's realm. After Thor implores Gorr to revive his daughter instead of destroying the gods, he leaves Gorr to decide while he attends to Foster, who succumbs to her illness in Thor's arms after they have completely made their peace with each other and her saying that Thor will look after Gorr's daughter. Moved by their display, Gorr wishes for Eternity to revive his daughter, Love, which it grants. Foster's spirit then arrives at the gates of Valhalla, where Heimdall welcomes her to the afterlife and thanks her for helping save his son.

== Alternate versions ==
=== Reality Stone Heist ===
In 2013, Foster is seen in Asgard and being shown to her room by a few Asgardian women. While she is sleeping, Rocket Raccoon sneaks in and uses a device to obtain the Reality Stone from her.

=== Party Prince Thor ===
In a universe where Loki was returned to the Frost Giants and Thor was raised as an only child, Thor travels to Las Vegas to start a party, inviting humans, Asgardians, and aliens alike. Astrophysicist Foster warns the government, but upon meeting Thor, she grows close to him. After S.H.I.E.L.D. director Nick Fury is incapacitated, Maria Hill confronts Foster due to her warning. As more aliens arrive, including the now-adult Prince Loki and several other Frost Giants, and Thor starts throwing destructive parties worldwide, Hill calls in Carol Danvers to persuade Thor to leave. He refuses and they fight, with Thor eventually defeating her when she avoids using her full power out of fear of causing casualties. Following this, Foster's intern, Darcy Lewis, suggests that Danvers instead attack Thor in less populated areas.

Seeking a more peaceful solution, Foster contacts Heimdall, who helps her meet Frigga and explain the situation. Frigga contacts Thor and tells him that she will be returning soon. Frightened, Thor ends the parties and convinces the party-goers to help him clean up. Frigga arrives, finding Thor studying with his retinue, but sees evidence of the partying. Before returning to Asgard, Thor visits Foster to forgive her and thank her for contacting Frigga. Thor asks Foster out for a date, however, he is suddenly confronted by an alternate reality version of Ultron in Vision's body, who wields all six Infinity Stones.

== Reception ==
While Natalie Portman's performance as Jane Foster was positively received by critics, Foster's character garnered mixed reviews. Richard Kuipers of Variety praised Portman's performance in Thor, but criticized the development of her character and her relationship with Thor, writing, "Though Thor's romance with Jane is passable, thanks largely to Portman's sterling work in a thinly written role, the couple isn't given enough alone time or meaningful dialogue to raise the relationship above the ordinary." Peter Travers of Rolling Stone stated Natalie Portman "winningly" portrays Jane Foster across Thor: The Dark World. Peter Bradshaw of The Guardian found that Portman portrayed Foster through The Dark World in a brave, spirited way. Dutta of /Film found Foster to be mishandled across the Thor film series, writing, "Although Jane has always been a resilient, intelligent person — a brilliant astrophysicist who did some incredible research on the complex Einstein–Rosen Bridge theory — her character was reduced to a damsel in distress in Thor: The Dark World, after which she completely disappeared from the MCU (I wouldn't count the dubious shot of the back of her head in Avengers: Endgame)." Valerie Complex of Deadline Hollywood referred to the character as a "damsel in distress" prior to Thor: Love and Thunder.

Following the release of Thor: Love and Thunder, Natalie Portman's performance was praised alongside Foster's character. Cooper Hood of Screen Rant noted that Portman's performance and Foster received very positive reviews from critics and audience alike, writing, "Those who have seen Thor: Love and Thunder already seem to be in complete agreement that Portman's inclusion as Mighty Thor is one of the most successful elements." Paul Chi of Vanity Fair noted that Portman as the Mighty Thor "caused a commotion on social media." Valerie Complex of Deadline Hollywood stated Love and Thunder succeeds to give Portman's character a meticulously developed arc to her character and complimented her performance, saying, "She's gone on record expressing her unhappiness with how she was portrayed as an underdeveloped damsel in distress in the first two Thor films. She is fully committed to the part and looks good while doing it. She has some very cool fight scenes and will hopefully do more of that the future." Nick Allen of RogerEbert.com reviewed Love and Thunder positively, praising Portman's performance and the development of her character across the film, stating, "In both her human and her heroic state, Portman's performance conveys why it's great to see Jane again." Todd Gilchrist of The A.V. Club gave a positive review of the film and applauded the performance of Portman, complimenting the development of her character across the movie, saying, "Portman delivers the goods as "The Mighty Thor," kicking ass alongside Hemsworth even if her inaptitude for catchphrases offers a solid running joke as she develops her heroic bona fides." Debbopriyaa Dutta of /Film found that Love and Thunder manages to empower Foster's character, stated the film succeeds to provide a realistic development of Foster's relationship with Thor, and found the death of the character to be a "good way of closing out Jane's arc within the context of the direction the film decided to march in." Lacy Baugher of Den of Geek called Portman "effervescent" as Foster, stating, the film "gives Jane Foster the story she's deserved for the past decade," and praised the development of the character, writing, "She has passed the test and become a true hero, and at long last when it comes to this character."

=== Accolades ===
Year	Work	Award	Category	Recipient(s)	Result	Ref(s)
2012	Thor	Jupiter Award	Best International Actress	Natalie Portman	Nominated	
2014	Thor: The Dark World	Teen Choice Awards	Choice Movie Actress: Sci-Fi/Fantasy	Natalie Portman	Nominated	
2023	Thor: Love and Thunder	Kids' Choice Awards	Favorite Movie Actress	Natalie Portman	Nominated	
2023	Thor: Love and Thunder	Critics' Choice Super Awards	Best Actress in a Superhero Movie	Natalie Portman	Nominated	
