= Marvel Studios: Legends =

2021–2023 Marvel Studios docuseries

- Genre: Clip show; Docuseries; Superhero
- Based on: Marvel Comics
- Country of origin: United States
- Original language: English
- No. of seasons: 3
- No. of episodes: 49

Production
- Running time: 5–10 minutes
- Production company: Marvel Studios

Original release
- Network: Disney+
- Release: January 8, 2021 – December 15, 2023
- Network: YouTube
- Release: June 13, 2025 – present

Related
- Marvel Studios: Assembled

Marvel Studios: Legends is an American television docuseries created for the streaming service Disney+, based on the Marvel Comics characters and objects that appear in the Marvel Cinematic Universe (MCU). Produced by Marvel Studios, each episode showcases an individual character or object with footage from past MCU films and Disney+ series, highlighting their prominent moments from the MCU.

The series was first announced in December 2020. Marvel Studios: Legends premiered on January 8, 2021, with subsequent episodes released shortly before a Disney+ series or special's premiere or a film's initial release. It received positive responses for being helpful to casual viewers of the franchise, but criticism for being a clip show with no new footage or documentary elements. The 26-episode first season covers projects in Phase Four of the MCU, while a 21-episode second season covers projects in Phase Five. Beginning with the second season, the episodes were also made available on Marvel Entertainment's YouTube channel, with the season one episodes eventually being added to YouTube as well. Beginning in 2025, episodes were released exclusively on YouTube.

== Premise ==
The series examines individual heroes, villains, moments, and objects from the Marvel Cinematic Universe (MCU) and how they connect, in anticipation of the upcoming stories that will feature them in the Disney+ series, films, and Special Presentations in Phase Four, Phase Five, and Six.

== Background ==
Marvel Studios: Legends was announced in December 2020 as a new series that would revisit characters from the Marvel Cinematic Universe (MCU) ahead of their appearances in new feature films and Disney+ series as part of Phase Four of the MCU. The series features short episodes made up of footage from past MCU films that featured the highlighted character, moment, or object. Two episodes were initially announced, with one for Wanda Maximoff and one for Vision ahead of their roles in WandaVision. Upon its announcement, many commentators believed the series would be a clip show and a good way to remind viewers of a character's history and allow casual viewers a quick way to catch-up without watching hours of past MCU content. Chaim Gartenberg at The Verge also likened the series to the one-page recaps Marvel Comics uses to similarly catch readers up for ongoing stories. Collider's Matt Goldberg felt Marvel Studios: Legends did not cost Disney or Marvel Studios "anything more than some editor's work and a bit of music" to produce, given each episode's length and content.

Subsequent Legends episodes were released for Falcon, Winter Soldier, Zemo, and Sharon Carter; Loki and the object the Tesseract; Natasha Romanoff / Black Widow; Peggy Carter, the Avengers Initiative, and the Ravagers group; the Ten Rings; Clint Barton / Hawkeye; Dr. Stephen Strange, Wong, and Wanda Maximoff / Scarlet Witch; Thor, Jane Foster, and Valkyrie; Bruce Banner; T'Challa, Shuri, and the Dora Milaje; and the Guardians of the Galaxy members Mantis and Drax, which concluded the first season.

The second season of Legends began in February 2023, and includes episodes for Scott Lang / Ant-Man, Hank Pym and Janet van Dyne, and Hope van Dyne / Wasp; the remaining Guardians of the Galaxy members Peter Quill, Gamora, Nebula, Rocket, Kraglin, and Groot; Nick Fury, Maria Hill, Talos and the Skrulls, Everett K. Ross, and James Rhodes / War Machine; "Variants" and the TVA; Carol Danvers, Monica Rambeau, and Kamala Khan; the Guardians of the Multiverse; and Riri Williams.

The third season of Legends began in July 2025, and features the episode for Wakanda's War Dogs, and the mutant Apocalypse.

== Episodes ==
Each episode consists entirely of archival footage from previous MCU films and television series.

Clip show in the Marvel Cinematic Universe
Season	Phase covered	Episodes	Originally released		
Season	Phase covered	Episodes	First released	Last released	Network
1	Four	26	January 8, 2021	November 23, 2022	Disney+
2	Five	21	February 10, 2023	December 15, 2023	Disney+
2	Five	21	June 13, 2025		YouTube
3	Six	2	July 29, 2025	TBA	YouTube

=== Season 1 (2021–2022) ===
List of Marvel Studios: Legends episodes
No. overall	No. in season	Title	Associated MCU work	Original release date (Note: Each Legends episode is released before the premiere of the associated series, film, or special.)
1	1	"Wanda Maximoff"	WandaVision	January 8, 2021
2	2	"Vision"	WandaVision	January 8, 2021
3	3	"Falcon"	The Falcon and the Winter Soldier	March 5, 2021
4	4	"The Winter Soldier"	The Falcon and the Winter Soldier	March 5, 2021
5	5	"Zemo"	The Falcon and the Winter Soldier	March 12, 2021
6	6	"Sharon Carter"	The Falcon and the Winter Soldier	March 12, 2021
7	7	"Loki"	Loki season 1	June 4, 2021
8	8	"The Tesseract"	Loki season 1	June 4, 2021
9	9	"Black Widow"	Black Widow	July 7, 2021
10	10	"Peggy Carter"	What If...? season 1	August 4, 2021
11	11	"The Avengers Initiative"	What If...? season 1	August 4, 2021
12	12	"The Ravagers"	What If...? season 1	August 4, 2021
13	13	"The Ten Rings"	Shang-Chi and the Legend of the Ten Rings	September 1, 2021
14	14	"Hawkeye"	Hawkeye	November 12, 2021
15	15	"Doctor Strange"	Doctor Strange in the Multiverse of Madness	April 29, 2022
16	16	"Wong"	Doctor Strange in the Multiverse of Madness	April 29, 2022
17	17	"Scarlet Witch"	Doctor Strange in the Multiverse of Madness	April 29, 2022
18	18	"Thor"	Thor: Love and Thunder	July 1, 2022
19	19	"Jane Foster"	Thor: Love and Thunder	July 1, 2022
20	20	"Valkyrie"	Thor: Love and Thunder	July 1, 2022
21	21	"Bruce Banner"	She-Hulk: Attorney at Law	August 10, 2022
22	22	"King T'Challa"	Black Panther: Wakanda Forever	November 4, 2022
23	23	"Princess Shuri"	Black Panther: Wakanda Forever	November 4, 2022
24	24	"The Dora Milaje"	Black Panther: Wakanda Forever	November 4, 2022
25	25	"Mantis"	The Guardians of the Galaxy Holiday Special	November 23, 2022
26	26	"Drax"	The Guardians of the Galaxy Holiday Special	November 23, 2022

=== Season 2 (2023–2025) ===
List of Marvel Studios: Legends episodes
No. overall	No. in season	Title	Associated MCU work	Original release date
27	1	"Ant-Man"	Ant-Man and the Wasp: Quantumania	February 10, 2023
28	2	"Wasp"	Ant-Man and the Wasp: Quantumania	February 10, 2023
29	3	"Hank & Janet"	Ant-Man and the Wasp: Quantumania	February 10, 2023
30	4	"Peter Quill"	Guardians of the Galaxy Vol. 3	April 28, 2023
31	5	"Gamora"	Guardians of the Galaxy Vol. 3	April 28, 2023
32	6	"Nebula"	Guardians of the Galaxy Vol. 3	April 28, 2023
33	7	"Rocket"	Guardians of the Galaxy Vol. 3	April 28, 2023
34	8	"Kraglin"	Guardians of the Galaxy Vol. 3	April 28, 2023
35	9	"Groot"	Guardians of the Galaxy Vol. 3	April 28, 2023
36	10	"Nick Fury"	Secret Invasion	June 14, 2023
37	11	"Maria Hill"	Secret Invasion	June 14, 2023
38	12	"Talos & the Skrulls"	Secret Invasion	June 14, 2023
39	13	"Everett Ross"	Secret Invasion	June 14, 2023
40	14	"James Rhodes"	Secret Invasion	June 14, 2023
41	15	"TVA"	Loki season 2	September 29, 2023
42	16	"Variants"	Loki season 2	September 29, 2023
43	17	"Carol Danvers"	The Marvels	November 3, 2023
44	18	"Kamala Khan"	The Marvels	November 3, 2023
45	19	"Monica Rambeau"	The Marvels	November 3, 2023
46	20	"Guardians of the Multiverse"	What If...? season 2	December 15, 2023
47	21	"Riri Williams"	Ironheart	June 13, 2025 (Note: Released on YouTube)

=== Season 3 (2025–present) ===
List of Marvel Studios: Legends episodes
No. overall	No. in season	Title	Associated work	Original release date
48	1	"War Dogs" "Wakanda's War Dogs"	Eyes of Wakanda	July 29, 2025
49	2	"Apocalypse"	X-Men '97 season 2	June 24, 2026

== Release ==
Marvel Studios: Legends released its first two episodes on January 8, 2021, on Disney+. Additional episodes were released before a character's appearance in a Disney+ series, special, or film. The Clint Barton episode debuted as part of Disney+'s "Disney+ Day" event. The "Mantis" and "Drax" episodes were removed from Disney+ shortly after their release on November 23, 2022. It is believed the removal was because of the inclusion of a deleted scene from Guardians of the Galaxy Vol. 2 in the "Mantis" episode, where the character was revealed as Peter Quill's sister; this was assumed to be a plot point that would be featured in The Guardians of the Galaxy Holiday Special. Both episodes were later restored.

Episodes for Ant-Man and the Wasp: Quantumania were released on February 10, 2023, on Disney+, beginning the second season of Legends. Those episodes were eventually made available for free on Marvel Entertainment's YouTube channel on February 16, with subsequent season two episodes through "Variants" made available on YouTube after their premiere on Disney+. The "Wanda Maximoff" episode was made available on Marvel Entertainment's YouTube channel on August 9, with the remaining season one episodes set to be made available on the channel in the following weeks. The Ironheart episode was released exclusively on YouTube.

The episodes for Eyes of Wakanda and X-Men '97 season 2 were also released on YouTube.

== Reception ==
Matt Goldberg at Collider described Legends as "elaborate fan videos that offer cross-promotion" for Marvel, which he did not think was bad, but he did wish that the series "offered up something new", such as actors "talking about their characters or offering a fresh teaser for" what was being promoted. He concluded that Legends was "content to be a highly produced recap video". Charlie Ridgely, writing for ComicBook.com, called Legends "incredibly handy" given there had not been any new MCU content in 2020. While conceding viewers already familiar with the highlighted character's stories might not see the need for the episodes since they were "quite literally just a recap of what happened in the movies", he felt it was still "a great refresher" for viewers interested in the new Marvel Disney+ content who "maybe aren't as into the greater MCU... allow[ing] everyone to be on a similar page". Variety's Caroline Framke felt Marvel was anticipating confusion from casual MCU viewers during their new Disney+ series, and called Legends "pretty helpful" heading into WandaVision. Some viewers were disappointed in the series, expecting a more in-depth documentary with creatives providing interviews rather than a clip show.

== Related documentaries ==
In February 2021, fellow Marvel Studios docuseries Marvel Studios: Assembled was announced. Some commentators called Assembled a companion series to Legends since Assembled presents behind-the-scenes material after an MCU film or series. In June 2022, the documentary short A Fan's Guide to Ms. Marvel was released on Disney+ in preparation for the character's debut in the series Ms. Marvel. It featured an exclusive look at the production of the series and interviews from the filmmaking team and star Iman Vellani. Additionally, the first episode of Echo employs flashbacks to help explain Maya Lopez's backstory as well as including her appearances on Hawkeye.
