= Marvel Cinematic Universe: Phase One =

2008–2012 group of superhero films

Phase One
- Packaging for the "Marvel Cinematic Universe – Phase One: Avengers Assembled" Blu-ray box set
- Based on: Characters published by Marvel Comics
- Produced by: Kevin Feige; Avi Arad (IM & TIH); Gale Anne Hurd (TIH)
- Starring: See below
- Production companies: Marvel Studios; Valhalla Entertainment (TIH; 2008)
- Distributed by: Paramount Pictures (2008–2011); Universal Pictures (TIH; 2008); Walt Disney Studios Motion Pictures (2012)
- Release date: 2008–2012
- Country: United States
- Language: English
- Budget: Total (6 films): $0.956–1 billion
- Box office: Total (6 films): $3.815 billion

Marvel Cinematic Universe Phases
- The Infinity Saga; Phase One (2008–2012); Phase Two (2013–2015); Phase Three (2016–2019)
- The Multiverse Saga; Phase Four (2021–2022); Phase Five (2023–2025); Phase Six (2025–2027)

Phase One of the Marvel Cinematic Universe (MCU) is a group of American superhero films produced by Marvel Studios based on characters that appear in publications by Marvel Comics. The MCU is the shared universe in which all of the films are set. Marvel previously licensed the film rights for some characters to other studios, before Marvel Studios was formed to produce their own feature films. Following the success of Iron Man, which began Phase One in May 2008, the studio moved forward with a plan to have individual superhero films culminate in a crossover film, The Avengers, which ended the phase in May 2012. Phases One, Two, and Three make up "The Infinity Saga" storyline.

Kevin Feige produced every film in the phase, with Avi Arad also producing Iron Man and The Incredible Hulk (2008), and Gale Anne Hurd also producing the latter. The films star Robert Downey Jr. as Tony Stark / Iron Man in Iron Man and Iron Man 2 (2010), Edward Norton as Bruce Banner / Hulk in The Incredible Hulk, Chris Hemsworth as Thor in Thor (2011), and Chris Evans as Steve Rogers / Captain America in Captain America: The First Avenger (2011). All returned to star in The Avengers except for Norton, who was replaced by Mark Ruffalo. Samuel L. Jackson has the most appearances in the phase, starring or making cameo appearances as Nick Fury in five films. Paramount Pictures distributed the films except for The Incredible Hulk, which was released by Universal Pictures, and The Avengers, which was released by Walt Disney Studios Motion Pictures. The films grossed over US$3.8 billion at the global box office, received generally positive critical and public responses, and were credited with establishing a foundation for the success of later phases.

In addition to the feature films, the phase also includes three short films that Marvel Studios created for their Marvel One-Shots program—The Consultant, A Funny Thing Happened on the Way to Thor's Hammer, and Item 47—to expand the MCU. Each feature film also received tie-in comic books and video games.

== Development ==
Marvel Entertainment was planning to produce its own films independently by 2005, and distribute them through Paramount Pictures. Previously, Marvel co-produced several superhero films based on Marvel Comics with Columbia Pictures, New Line Cinema, and other studios, including a seven-year development deal with 20th Century Fox. Marvel made relatively little profit from these licensing deals and wanted to get more money out of its films while maintaining artistic control of the projects and distribution. Avi Arad, head of Marvel's film division, was pleased with Sam Raimi's Spider-Man films at Sony Pictures, but was less pleased with others. He decided to form Marvel Studios, Hollywood's first major independent film studio since DreamWorks Pictures was founded in 1994. Kevin Feige, Arad's second-in-command, realized that Marvel still owned the rights to many of the core members of the Avengers team, unlike the popular characters Spider-Man and the X-Men whose film rights were licensed to Sony and Fox, respectively. Feige, a self-described "fanboy", envisioned a shared universe where individual superhero franchises could co-exist and then come together in crossover events, just as creators Stan Lee and Jack Kirby had done with Marvel Comics in the 1960s.

In order to preserve its artistic integrity, Marvel Studios formed a creative committee of six people familiar with its comic book lore: Feige, Marvel Studios co-president Louis D'Esposito, Marvel Comics' president of publishing Dan Buckley, Marvel's chief creative officer Joe Quesada, writer Brian Michael Bendis, and Marvel Entertainment president Alan Fine who oversaw the committee. Feige initially referred to their shared narrative continuity as the "Marvel Cinema Universe", but later used the term "Marvel Cinematic Universe" (MCU). Marvel gained the film rights to Iron Man from New Line Cinema in November 2005. In February 2006, the studio gained the film rights to Hulk from Universal Pictures, in exchange for letting Universal own the distribution rights to The Incredible Hulk (2008) and the right of first refusal to pick up the distribution rights to any future Marvel Studios-produced Hulk films. In mid-2006, Thor was announced to be a Marvel Studios production, and Lionsgate dropped a Black Widow project it had been working on since 2004, giving the rights back to Marvel. In May, Arad left Marvel Studios to be an independent producer. Because he was on staff when the deals were made for Iron Man (2008) and The Incredible Hulk, he retained producer credit on both films.

Feige was named President of Production at Marvel Studios in March 2007, as Iron Man began filming. After the film's successful opening weekend in May 2008, he was promoted to president of Marvel Studios, and the release dates for further films were announced: Iron Man 2 on April 30, 2010; Thor on June 4, 2010; The First Avenger: Captain America on May 6, 2011; and the team-up film The Avengers on July 15, 2011. The latter would bring together Iron Man, the Hulk, Captain America, and Thor. In March 2009, Marvel adjusted their release schedule, moving Thor to June 17, 2011, and then to May 20, 2011; The First Avenger: Captain America to July 22, 2011; and The Avengers to May 4, 2012. In January 2010, Thor's release date was moved once again, to May 6, 2011. That April, the title of The First Avenger: Captain America was changed to Captain America: The First Avenger. Feige said Edgar Wright's pitch for Ant-Man helped shape the early films of the MCU, with some of their plans changing to accommodate Wright's version of the film such as the roster for the Avengers. Marvel Studios started using phrases like "Phase One" because Feige did not want to refer to the films with names like the Iron Man trilogy or the Thor trilogy. Feige said the idea of "phases" was inspired by the way the comics are grouped together, with individual characters that occasionally come together for a "mega-event limited series". This led to the planned structure of each phase ending with an Avengers crossover film.

In October 2010, Walt Disney Studios Motion Pictures acquired the distribution rights for The Avengers from Paramount Pictures, though Paramount's logo and credit remain on the film. In July 2013, Disney purchased the distribution rights to Iron Man, Iron Man 2, Thor, and The First Avenger from Paramount. In June 2023, the distribution rights to The Incredible Hulk reverted from Universal back to Marvel and Disney.

== Films ==
Phase One films
Film	U.S. release date	Directed by	Screenplay by	Produced by
Iron Man	May 2, 2008	Jon Favreau	Mark Fergus & Hawk Ostby and Art Marcum & Matt Holloway	Avi Arad and Kevin Feige
The Incredible Hulk	June 13, 2008	Louis Leterrier	Zak Penn	Avi Arad, Gale Anne Hurd, and Kevin Feige
Iron Man 2	May 7, 2010	Jon Favreau	Justin Theroux	Kevin Feige
Thor	May 6, 2011	Kenneth Branagh	Ashley Edward Miller & Zack Stentz and Don Payne	Kevin Feige
Captain America: The First Avenger	July 22, 2011	Joe Johnston	Christopher Markus & Stephen McFeely	Kevin Feige
The Avengers	May 4, 2012	Joss Whedon	Joss Whedon	Kevin Feige

=== Iron Man (2008) ===
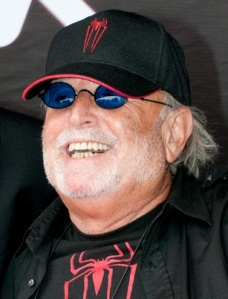
Avi Arad, the head of Marvel's film division until May 2006, is credited as a producer on Iron Man and The Incredible Hulk.

Billionaire industrialist Tony Stark builds himself a suit of armor after he is taken captive by a terrorist organization. Free from his captors, he decides to upgrade and don his armor in order to hunt down weapons that were sold under the table, becoming a superhero known as "Iron Man".

In April 2006, Marvel hired Jon Favreau to direct Iron Man, with the writing teams of Art Marcum and Matt Holloway and Mark Fergus and Hawk Ostby writing competing scripts. Favreau consolidated both into one script, which was then polished by John August. Robert Downey Jr. was cast to star as Tony Stark / Iron Man in September 2006. Principal photography began on March 12, 2007, with the first few weeks spent on Stark's captivity in Afghanistan, which was filmed in Inyo County, California. Production also occurred on the former Hughes Airport soundstages in Playa Vista, Los Angeles, with additional filming at Edwards Air Force Base and Caesars Palace in Las Vegas, Nevada. Iron Man premiered at the Greater Union theater in George Street, Sydney, on April 14, 2008. It was released internationally on April 30, and in the United States on May 2.

The film ends with a post-credits scene featuring Samuel L. Jackson as Nick Fury, who approaches Stark regarding the "Avenger Initiative". Favreau said he included the scene as "a little tip of the hat for the fans... a way to sort of tee up The Avengers". Jackson was only on set for a day, with a skeleton crew used to prevent the news of his cameo appearance from being leaked. Captain America's shield is also visible in the background of a scene; it was added by an Industrial Light & Magic (ILM) artist as a joke, and Favreau decided to leave it in the film.

=== The Incredible Hulk (2008) ===
After being exposed to gamma radiation that causes him to transform into the monstrous Hulk, scientist Bruce Banner goes on the run and isolates himself from his love, Betty Ross. Hunted by the U.S. military, Banner seeks to cure himself and prevent his condition from being weaponized.

After gaining the film rights to Hulk from Universal, except for the distribution rights, Marvel chose not to move forward with a sequel to director Ang Lee's 2003 film Hulk. Instead, Marvel hired Louis Leterrier to direct a reboot titled The Incredible Hulk. Leterrier initially turned down the job out of respect for Lee, but later reconsidered and signed on. The script was written by Zak Penn, who drafted a treatment for the 2003 film. In April 2006, Edward Norton entered negotiations to portray Bruce Banner and rewrite Penn's script, although Penn received sole credit for the screenplay. Production began on July 9, 2007, and filming primarily took place in Toronto, with additional filming in New York City and Rio de Janeiro. The Incredible Hulk premiered at the Gibson Amphitheatre on June 8, 2008, and was released theatrically on June 13.

The film takes place simultaneously with the events of Iron Man 2 and Thor, the former of which is set six months after the events of Iron Man. Downey briefly reprised his role from Iron Man as Tony Stark in a cameo appearance at the end of the film. Downey said the filmmakers "were just cross-pollinating our superheroes. It happens to be a scene where I basically approach [actor William Hurt's character General Ross], and we may be considering going into some sort of limited partnership together." In addition, Captain America is briefly seen frozen in ice in an alternate opening of the film that was included in the DVD release.

=== Iron Man 2 (2010) ===
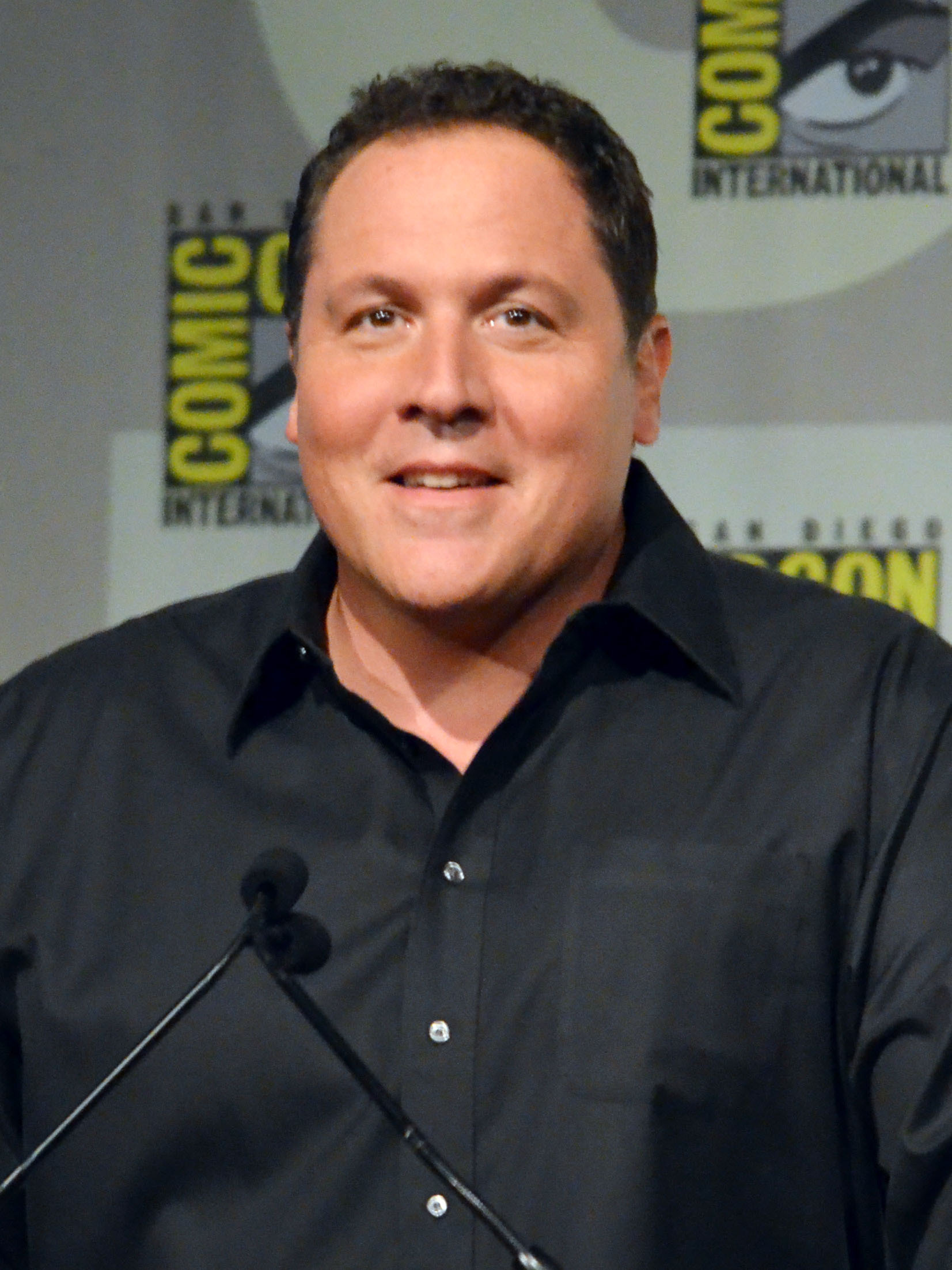
Jon Favreau, director of Iron Man and Iron Man 2, helped establish the MCU.

After the events of Iron Man, during which Tony Stark publicly reveals himself to be the superhero Iron Man, the U.S. government demands Stark hand over his technology. Rival industrialist Justin Hammer and Russian scientist Ivan Vanko conspire to use Stark's own technology against him.

Development on a sequel to Iron Man began in May 2008 after the success of the first film. Favreau returned as director, and Justin Theroux was hired to write the screenplay based on a story by Favreau and Downey. In October 2008, Downey signed a new four-picture deal—retroactively including the first film—to reprise his role. Don Cheadle was hired to replace Terrence Howard as Stark's friend James Rhodes. Jackson signed on to reprise his role as Nick Fury from the first film's post-credits scene in up to nine films, and Scarlett Johansson was cast as Natasha Romanoff / Black Widow in a multi-film commitment. Principal photography began on April 6, 2009, at the Pasadena Masonic Temple in Pasadena, California. The majority of filming took place at Raleigh Studios in Manhattan Beach, California. Other locations included Edwards Air Force Base, Monaco, and the Sepulveda Dam. Iron Man 2 premiered at the El Capitan Theatre in Los Angeles, California, on April 26, 2010. It was released internationally from April 28, and in the U.S. on May 7.

The film is set six months after the events of Iron Man, and takes place simultaneously with the events of The Incredible Hulk and Thor. The filmmakers continued to refer to other Marvel films by again including Captain America's shield. Favreau explained, "We introduced Captain America's shield briefly in one shot in the last film. So now it really was in his room, so we had to figure out how to deal with the reality that the shield was in his workshop." A scene toward the end of Iron Man 2 in a S.H.I.E.L.D. safehouse contains several Easter eggs, ranging from The Incredible Hulk footage displayed on a monitor to a map that indicates several locales related to other Marvel films, including one pointing toward a region of Africa in reference to the Black Panther. A child wearing an Iron Man mask whom Stark saves from a drone was retroactively determined to be a young Peter Parker / Spider-Man, as confirmed in June 2017 by Feige, Spider-Man actor Tom Holland, and Spider-Man: Homecoming (2017) director Jon Watts. Iron Man 2's post-credits scene shows the discovery of Thor's hammer in a crater.

=== Thor (2011) ===
Thor, crown prince of Asgard, is banished to Earth and stripped of his powers after he reignites a dormant war. As his brother, Loki, plots to take the throne, Thor must prove himself worthy and reclaim his hammer Mjolnir.

Mark Protosevich was hired to develop a script for Thor in April 2006, after the rights were acquired from Sony Pictures. In August 2007, Marvel hired Matthew Vaughn to direct the film, but he exited the project in May 2008. In September, Kenneth Branagh entered into negotiations to replace Vaughn. Chris Hemsworth was in negotiations to portray the title character in May 2009, and Tom Hiddleston was set to play his brother, Loki. Both actors were contracted for several films. Marvel hired the writing team of Ashley Edward Miller and Zack Stentz to write a new script for the film, which was then rewritten by Don Payne. Production began on January 11, 2010, in Los Angeles, California, before moving to Galisteo, New Mexico, in March. Thor had its world premiere on April 17, 2011, at the Event Cinemas theater in George Street, Sydney, and a U.S. premiere on May 2 at the El Capitan Theatre in Los Angeles, California. The film was released internationally from April 21, and in the U.S. on May 6.

The film takes place simultaneously with the events of The Incredible Hulk and Iron Man 2, the latter of which is set six months after the events of Iron Man. Clark Gregg, who appeared in Iron Man and Iron Man 2 as S.H.I.E.L.D. agent Phil Coulson, reprised the role in Thor. About his role in Thor he stated, "Agent Coulson was one of the guys who wasn't really in the comic books, and he [had] a very kind of small role in Iron Man. And I was just very lucky that they chose to expand that character and [chose] to put him more into the universe of it." After signing on to appear as Clint Barton / Hawkeye in The Avengers, Jeremy Renner made a cameo appearance as the character during a scene in Thor. Branagh said they "were always going to have a guy in a basket above the action where Thor breaks into the S.H.I.E.L.D. camp", and he was thrilled when the producers told him they wanted to use Renner's Hawkeye for that role. The film ends with a post-credits scene featuring Loki, watching as Erik Selvig and Nick Fury discuss the Tesseract. The scene was directed by Joss Whedon, director of The Avengers. Selvig actor Stellan Skarsgård said the scene was not included when he first read the screenplay for Thor, and he was sent pages for the scene after agreeing to appear in The Avengers.

=== Captain America: The First Avenger (2011) ===
In 1943, Steve Rogers is deemed physically unfit to enlist in the U.S. Army and fight the German Reich in World War II. Recruited for a secret military operation, he is physically transformed into a super-soldier dubbed "Captain America" and must battle the Red Skull, head of a Nazi science division known as Hydra.

In April 2006, Marvel hired David Self to write the script for a Captain America film. Joe Johnston signed on to direct in November 2008, and Christopher Markus & Stephen McFeely were hired to rewrite the script. In March 2010, Chris Evans was cast as Captain America and Hugo Weaving was cast as the Red Skull. Additional castings included Sebastian Stan as Rogers's friend Bucky Barnes and Hayley Atwell as Rogers's love interest Peggy Carter. Production began on June 28, 2010, in the United Kingdom, with locations in London, Caerwent, Manchester, and Liverpool. Captain America: The First Avenger premiered on July 19, 2011, at the El Capitan Theatre in Los Angeles, California. It was released in the U.S. on July 22, and in international markets starting July 27.

The Tesseract from the Thor post-credits scene appears as a MacGuffin in The First Avenger. In the film, Dominic Cooper portrays a young Howard Stark, the father of Tony Stark, who hosts an early version of the Stark Expo, the fair Tony hosts in Iron Man 2. The final scene of the film includes a brief appearance by Jackson's Nick Fury. A teaser trailer for The Avengers is included after the credits.

=== The Avengers (2012) ===
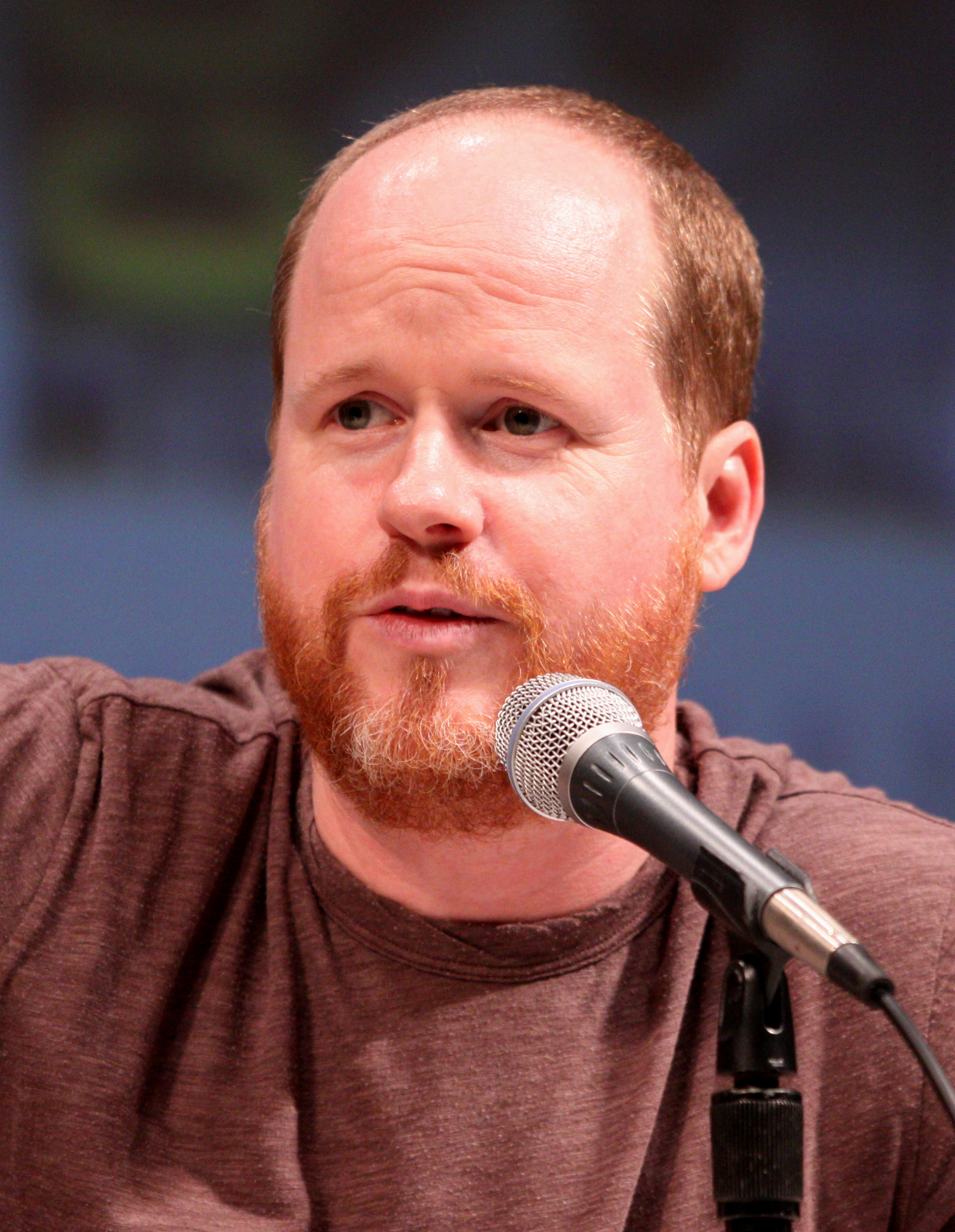
Joss Whedon wrote and directed the crossover film The Avengers.

S.H.I.E.L.D. director Nick Fury gathers the superheroes Iron Man, Thor, Captain America, Hulk, Black Widow, and Hawkeye to stop Thor's brother Loki from subjugating the Earth.

The Incredible Hulk writer Zak Penn was hired to write The Avengers in June 2007. Joss Whedon closed a deal in April 2010 to direct the film and rework Penn's script. Marvel announced that Edward Norton would not be reprising the role of Bruce Banner / Hulk, and Mark Ruffalo was cast in his place in July. Downey, Evans, Hemsworth, Johansson, Renner, Hiddleston, and Jackson reprised their respective roles from previous films. Principal photography began in April 2011 in Albuquerque, New Mexico, before moving to Cleveland, Ohio, in August, and New York City in September. The Avengers premiered on April 11, 2012, at the El Capitan Theatre in Los Angeles, California, and was released in the U.S. on May 4.

Gwyneth Paltrow, who portrayed Pepper Potts in Iron Man and Iron Man 2, was included in the film at Downey's insistence. Prior to this, Whedon did not intend to include supporting characters from the heroes' individual films, saying, "You need to separate the characters from their support systems in order to create the isolation you need for a team." Gregg also returns as Phil Coulson, along with Maximiliano Hernández as Jasper Sitwell from Thor. The supervillain Thanos is introduced in a mid-credits scene, portrayed by Damion Poitier.

== Short films ==
Marvel One-Shots are a series of direct-to-video short films that are included as special features in the MCU films' Blu-ray and digital distribution releases. They are designed to be self-contained stories that provide more backstory for characters or events introduced in the films.

Phase One short films
Film	U.S. release date	Director	Screenwriter	Producer	Home media release
The Consultant	September 13, 2011	Leythum	Eric Pearson	Kevin Feige	Thor
A Funny Thing Happened on the Way to Thor's Hammer	October 25, 2011	Leythum	Eric Pearson	Kevin Feige	Captain America: The First Avenger
Item 47	September 25, 2012	Louis D'Esposito	Eric Pearson	Kevin Feige	The Avengers

== Timeline ==
Marvel Cinematic Universe: Phase One timeline Full timeline at Marvel Cinematic Universe timeline
1943–1945	The First Avenger
1946–2009	
2010	Iron Man
2011	Iron Man 2
2011	The Incredible Hulk
2011	A Funny Thing...
2011	Thor
2011	The Consultant
2012	The Avengers
2012	Item 47

External image
- The Phase One Timeline infographic released by Marvel in May 2012

During Phase One, Marvel Studios lined up some of their films' stories with references to one another, though they had no long-term plan for the shared universe's timeline at that point. Iron Man 2 is set six months after the events of Iron Man, and around the same time as Thor according to comments made by Nick Fury. The official tie-in comic Fury's Big Week confirmed that The Incredible Hulk, Iron Man 2, and Thor all take place within a week, a year before the crossover film The Avengers. Writers Chris Yost and Eric Pearson tried to follow the logic of the films' timeline when plotting the comic, and received "the seal of approval" from Feige and Marvel Studios on the final timeline. As part of promotion ahead of the release of The Avengers, Marvel released an official infographic detailing this timeline in May 2012.

The One-Shot The Consultant is set after the events of Iron Man 2 and The Incredible Hulk, A Funny Thing Happened on the Way to Thor's Hammer is set before the events of Thor, and Item 47 is set after The Avengers.

== Recurring cast and characters ==
List indicators

This section includes characters who have appeared in multiple Phase One films, and have appeared in the billing block for at least one film.

- A dark grey cell indicates the character was not in the film.
- A ^{C} indicates an uncredited cameo role.
- An ^{OS} indicates the character appears in a One-Shot.
- A ^{P} indicates an appearance in onscreen photographs.
- A ^{V} indicates a voice-only role.

Characters are listed alphabetically by last name, as applicable.

Recurring cast and characters of Phase One
Character	2008		2010	2011		2012
Character	Iron Man	The Incredible Hulk	Iron Man 2	Thor	Captain America: The First Avenger	Marvel's The Avengers
Bruce Banner Hulk		Edward Norton; Lou Ferrigno^{V}				Mark Ruffalo
Clint Barton Hawkeye				Jeremy Renner^{C}		Jeremy Renner
Phil Coulson^{OS}	Clark Gregg		Clark Gregg	Clark Gregg		Clark Gregg
Nick Fury	Samuel L. Jackson^{C}		Samuel L. Jackson	Samuel L. Jackson^{C}	Samuel L. Jackson	Samuel L. Jackson
Loki				Tom Hiddleston		Tom Hiddleston
Virginia "Pepper" Potts	Gwyneth Paltrow		Gwyneth Paltrow			Gwyneth Paltrow
James "Rhodey" Rhodes War Machine	Terrence Howard		Don Cheadle			
Steve Rogers Captain America					Chris Evans	Chris Evans
Natasha Romanoff Black Widow			Scarlett Johansson			Scarlett Johansson
Erik Selvig				Stellan Skarsgård		Stellan Skarsgård
Howard Stark	Gerard Sanders^{P}		John Slattery		Dominic Cooper	
Tony Stark Iron Man^{OS}	Robert Downey Jr.	Robert Downey Jr.^{C}	Robert Downey Jr.			Robert Downey Jr.
Thor				Chris Hemsworth		Chris Hemsworth

== Music ==
Score albums for Phase One films
Title	U.S. release date	Length	Composer	Label(s)	Ref.
Iron Man: Original Motion Picture Soundtrack	May 6, 2008	54:14	Ramin Djawadi	Lionsgate Records	
The Incredible Hulk: Original Motion Picture Score	June 13, 2008	110:55	Craig Armstrong	Marvel Music	
Iron Man 2: Original Motion Picture Score	July 20, 2010	72:01	John Debney	Columbia Records	
Thor	May 3, 2011	71:53	Patrick Doyle	Buena Vista Records; Marvel Music	
Captain America: The First Avenger—Original Motion Picture Soundtrack	July 19, 2011	71:53	Alan Silvestri	Buena Vista Records; Marvel Music	
The Avengers (Original Motion Picture Soundtrack)	May 1, 2012	64:25	Alan Silvestri	Hollywood Records; Marvel Music	

Compilation albums for Phase One films
Title	U.S. release date	Length	Label(s)	Ref.
AC/DC: Iron Man 2	April 19, 2010	60:15	Columbia Records	
Avengers Assemble (Music from and Inspired by the Motion Picture)	May 1, 2012	48:20	Hollywood Records; Marvel Music	

Avengers Assemble includes the original song "Live to Rise" by Soundgarden.

== Home media ==
Home media releases of Phase One
Film	DVD/Blu-ray release
Iron Man	September 30, 2008
The Incredible Hulk	October 21, 2008
Iron Man 2	September 28, 2010
Thor	September 13, 2011
Captain America: The First Avenger	October 25, 2011
The Avengers	September 25, 2012 (also released digitally)

A 10-disc box set titled "Marvel Cinematic Universe: Phase One – Avengers Assembled" was announced for release on September 25, 2012. It includes all six films on Blu-ray and Blu-ray 3D, in a replica of Nick Fury's briefcase from The Avengers. In August, luggage company Rimowa GmbH, which developed the briefcase for The Avengers, filed a lawsuit against Marvel Studios and Buena Vista Home Entertainment in U.S. federal court, complaining that Marvel did not obtain a license or authorization from Rimowa to replicate the case. The set was delayed to early 2013 for the packaging to be redesigned. The redesigned box set was released on April 2, 2013. It includes a featurette on the then-upcoming Phase Two films, showing footage and concept art, as well as previously unreleased deleted scenes from all of the Phase One films.

== Reception ==
=== Box office performance ===
The Avengers was the first film of the MCU to reach $1 billion.

Box office performance of Phase One
Film	U.S. release date	Box office gross			All-time ranking		Budget	Ref.
Film	U.S. release date	U.S. and Canada	Other territories	Worldwide	U.S. and Canada	Worldwide	Budget	Ref.
Iron Man	May 2, 2008	$319,034,126	$266,762,121	$585,796,247	89	190	$140 million	
The Incredible Hulk	June 13, 2008	$134,806,913	$129,964,083	$264,770,996	494	625	$137.5–150 million	
Iron Man 2	May 7, 2010	$312,433,331	$311,500,000	$623,933,331	95	172	$170–200 million	
Thor	May 6, 2011	$181,030,624	$268,295,994	$449,326,618	280	290	$150 million	
Captain America: The First Avenger	July 22, 2011	$176,654,505	$193,915,269	$370,569,774	298	394	$140 million	
The Avengers	May 4, 2012	$623,357,910	$897,180,626	$1,520,538,536	12	10	$220 million	
Total		$1,747,317,409	$2,067,618,093	$3,814,935,502	–	–	$0.956–1 billion	

=== Critical and public response ===
Critical and public response of Phase One
Film	Critical		Public
Film	Rotten Tomatoes	Metacritic	CinemaScore
Iron Man	94% (278 reviews)	79 (38 reviews)	A
The Incredible Hulk	68% (238 reviews)	61 (38 reviews)	A−
Iron Man 2	72% (299 reviews)	57 (40 reviews)	A
Thor	77% (292 reviews)	57 (40 reviews)	B+
Captain America: The First Avenger	80% (274 reviews)	66 (43 reviews)	A−
The Avengers	91% (363 reviews)	69 (43 reviews)	A+

Discussing Phase One and the success that the MCU went on to have, Germain Lussier at Gizmodo said it was "easy to forget this was never a sure thing". He highlighted the perceived risks of making films based on less popular characters such as Iron Man and Thor, which were not guaranteed to succeed. A crossover with six different characters had also not been attempted before, and Marvel began production on The Avengers before some of the individual films had even been released. Feige expressed similar thoughts when asked which films he was the most nervous to release, adding that he is proud of all the studio's films but he felt the whole franchise would not have worked if Phase One was not successful. Writing for The Daily Dot, Michelle Jaworski also said the greater MCU would not have been possible without the groundwork established in Phase One. She said The Avengers "changed the game" and "makes the impossible work" in bringing the different heroes together, but believed this only worked because the five films leading up to it had established "each superhero as someone worth rooting for" and turned the group of relatively unknown characters into household names. Jaworski praised Loki as "one of Marvel's great movie villains", but was critical of the other villains in the phase.

Darren Gigool at MovieWeb described Phase One as a "huge success" and attributed this to several factors, including: a strong foundation with Iron Man's critical and commercial response, which gave Marvel Studios the confidence to take risks with the franchise; efforts to have an interconnected shared universe from the beginning, through character crossovers and post-credits teasers, which built a "cohesive universe that fans could invest in and follow across multiple films" in contrast with the more standalone nature of some previous franchises; fan engagement through Easter eggs and references, rewarding loyal fans who came to anticipate each new release; and effective character development for the phase's main characters, such as Iron Man, Captain America, Thor, and the Hulk who Gigool believed had all become iconic cinematic characters. Discussing and analyzing the phase for the Wales Arts Review, Isobel Roach said much of Marvel's success was owed to the casting of Downey in Iron Man. She also noted that the MCU's use of humor and self-awareness differentiated it from other superhero films of the time, such as director Christopher Nolan's Dark Knight film trilogy. Roach believed Iron Man 2 was underrated and said it had "an indisputable mark of quality", while Thor showed the first signs of "something less than serious" that would be further explored in future films, and The First Avenger provided "a founding myth for the concept of the cinematic superhero" with a strong emotional ending. Regarding the success of The Avengers, Roach said it was the smaller character moments of bonding and contemplation that won over audiences, believing that the main actors worked better as an ensemble than in their individual films.

Several commentators have used ranked lists when revisiting the MCU phases. After Phase Four was released, Rich Knight at CinemaBlend listed Phase One second-best behind Phase Three, while Jeff Ames of ComingSoon.net placed it third after Phases Three and Two. Knight thought The Incredible Hulk and Iron Man 2 were "kind of bad", but he said each film in the phase "felt important and like they were building toward something great". He added that The Avengers "still holds up". Ames said the individual films after Iron Man were not as successful as that film, but they each "introduced likable characters, provided mild entertainment, and left audiences pining for more". He said it was The Avengers which "truly gave the MCU its legs". After Phase Five was released, The Mary Sue's Rachel Ulatowski listed Phase One second after Phase Three. She said it had the most cohesive overarching storyline of all the phases—introducing each member of the Avengers ahead of the crossover film—despite the franchise still finding its footing. Ulatowski found the quality of the films to be strong, except for The Incredible Hulk and Iron Man 2, and praised the plots, acting, directing, and visuals of the other films. She said The Avengers "left audiences invigorated and excited for the future of the MCU".

=== Accolades ===
The films of Phase One have been nominated for four Academy Awards, two BAFTA Awards, one Grammy Award, thirty Saturn Awards (winning eight), three Hugo Awards (winning one), eleven MTV Movie & TV Awards (winning four), and eighteen Visual Effects Society Awards (winning three), among others.

== Tie-in media ==
=== Comic books ===
Tie-in comics of Phase One
Title	No. of issues	Publication date		Writer(s)	Artist(s)
Title	No. of issues	First published	Last published	Writer(s)	Artist(s)
Iron Man: I Am Iron Man!	2	January 27, 2010	February 24, 2010	Peter David	Sean Chen
Iron Man 2: Public Identity	3	April 28, 2010	May 12, 2010	Joe Casey and Justin Theroux	Barry Kitson
Iron Man 2: Agents of S.H.I.E.L.D.	1	September 1, 2010		Joe Casey	Tim Green, Felix Ruiz, and Matt Camp
Captain America: First Vengeance	8 (digital); 4 (print)	May 4, 2011	June 29, 2011	Fred Van Lente	Neil Edwards and Luke Ross
Marvel's The Avengers Prelude: Fury's Big Week	8 (digital); 4 (print)	March 7, 2012	April 18, 2012	Story by : Christopher Yost and Eric Pearson; Scripts by : Eric Pearson	Luke Ross
Marvel's The Avengers: Black Widow Strikes	3	May 2, 2012	June 6, 2012	Fred Van Lente	Neil Edwards
Marvel's Iron Man 2	2	November 7, 2012	December 5, 2012	Christos Gage	Ramon Rosanas
Marvel's Thor	2	January 16, 2013	February 20, 2013	Christos Gage	Lan Medina
Marvel's Captain America: The First Avenger	2	November 6, 2013	December 11, 2013	Peter David	Wellinton Alves
Marvel's The Avengers	2	December 24, 2014	January 7, 2015	Will Corona Pilgrim	Joe Bennett

=== Books ===
In September 2015, Marvel announced the Guidebook to the Marvel Cinematic Universe, named as a nod to the Official Handbook of the Marvel Universe for the comics. The guidebooks were compiled by Mike O'Sullivan and the Official Handbook of the Marvel Universe team, with cover art by Mike del Mundo and Pascal Campion. They feature facts about the MCU films, film-to-comic comparisons, and production stills. Guidebook to the Marvel Cinematic Universe: Marvel's Iron Man, Guidebook to the Marvel Cinematic Universe: Marvel's Incredible Hulk / Marvel's Iron Man 2, Guidebook to the Marvel Cinematic Universe: Marvel's Thor, and Guidebook to the Marvel Cinematic Universe: Marvel's Captain America: The First Avenger were respectively released each month from October 2015 to January 2016.

=== Video games ===
Tie-in video games of Phase One
Title	U.S. release date	Publisher	Developer	Platforms
Iron Man	May 2, 2008	Sega	Secret Level Artificial Mind and Movement Hands-On Mobile	PlayStation 3 and Xbox 360 PlayStation 2, Wii, Microsoft Windows, Nintendo DS, and PlayStation Portable Various mobile devices
The Incredible Hulk	June 5, 2008	Sega	Edge of Reality Amaze Entertainment Hands-On Mobile	PlayStation 2, PlayStation 3, Xbox 360, Microsoft Windows, and Wii Nintendo DS (version) Various mobile devices
Iron Man 2	May 4, 2010	Sega	Sega Studios San Francisco High Voltage Software Griptonite Games	PlayStation 3 and Xbox 360 Wii and PlayStation Portable Nintendo DS
Iron Man 2	May 4, 2010	Gameloft		iOS and BlackBerry
Thor: God of Thunder	May 3, 2011	Sega	Liquid Entertainment Red Fly Studio WayForward Technologies	PlayStation 3 and Xbox 360 Wii and Nintendo 3DS Nintendo DS
Captain America: Super Soldier	July 19, 2011	Sega	Next Level Games High Voltage Software Graphite Games	PlayStation 3 and Xbox 360 Wii and Nintendo 3DS Nintendo DS
The Avengers: The Mobile Game	May 2, 2012	Gameloft		iOS, Android, and Blackberry
Lego Marvel's Avengers	January 26, 2016	Warner Bros. Interactive; Entertainment	TT Games	PlayStation 4, Xbox One, Microsoft Windows, PlayStation 3, Xbox 360, Wii U, Nintendo 3DS, and PlayStation Vita
Lego Marvel's Avengers	March 10, 2016	Feral Interactive	TT Games	macOS
