= Fury's Big Week =

Comic book tie-in to the Marvel Cinemetic Universe

- Cover of chapter 2. Art by Gerald Parel.

Publication information
- Publisher: Marvel Comics
- Format: Limited series
- Genre: Superhero
- Publication date: March – April 2012
- No. of issues: 8 (digital), 4 ("chapters" in paper)

Creative team
- Written by: Chris Yost; Eric Pearson
- Pencillers: Luke Ross; Daniel Hdr; Agustin Padilla; Wellinton Alves
- Inkers: Mark Pennington; Rick Ketcham; Don Ho

Marvel's The Avengers Prelude: Fury's Big Week, or simply Fury's Big Week, is a limited series comic book published by Marvel Comics as an official tie-in comic to the Marvel Cinematic Universe (MCU), specifically the 2012 film Marvel's The Avengers. The comic was written by Eric Pearson from stories by himself and Chris Yost, with art by various pencillers. Fury's Big Week follows Nick Fury and several agents of S.H.I.E.L.D. as they deal with the various events of the MCU films leading up to The Avengers.

Marvel began releasing tie-in comics to the MCU films in 2008, and revealed an expanded marketing plan for its published tie-ins ahead of the release of The Avengers. Fury's Big Week was announced in February 2012, with Marvel Studios working closely with the comics division to ensure continuity between the various products. The comic draws connections between the different films of Marvel's Phase One, retelling events from the perspective of S.H.I.E.L.D. and adding new character interactions and sequences.

Fury's Big Week was released digitally in eight issues from February to March 2012, to tie-in with the film's marketing. The comic was then published in hard copy from March to April as four individual chapters.

== Publication history ==
Marvel Comics began releasing limited comic series to tie-in with Marvel Studios' Marvel Cinematic Universe (MCU) films in 2008, and by 2010 had discussed the plan to have them be "not necessarily direct adaptations of the movies, but maybe something that happened off screen and was mentioned in the movie". Then editor-in-chief of Marvel Comics Joe Quesada explained that the publisher would be working closely with Marvel Studios and the creators behind the films when developing the tie-ins. For Marvel's The Avengers (2012), Marvel's senior vice-president of sales David Gabriel described a "more focused" approach to tie-ins than previously, with the intention to reach fans of 'all walks of life'.

In February 2012, Marvel announced Marvel's The Avengers Prelude: Fury's Big Week, written by Chris Yost and Eric Pearson. Yost and Pearson had both been members of Marvel Studios' in-house Writers Program, developing feature films such as Thor and Captain America: The First Avenger (both 2011), so when it came to Fury's Big Week Marvel "realized they had two writers in house that knew the cinematic universe better than anybody". Pearson, who had never written a comic before but did write several Marvel One-Shots for the company, was responsible for the final scripts, with Yost assisting him with plotting the series. The pair worked together to develop the format of each issue, and then Pearson "just kind of went until I didn't know what to do and then ask for help." Yost and Pearson hoped to introduce long-established comic elements such as "the full extent of S.H.I.E.L.D." to fans of the films. Art for the series was provided Luke Ross, Daniel Hdr, Agustin Padilla and Wellinton Alves.

The comic retells the events of The Incredible Hulk (2008), Iron Man 2 (2010), Thor and Captain America: The First Avenger from the point-of-view of S.H.I.E.L.D., with extra scenes added to weave them all together. Yost and Pearson "saw the [MCU] timeline, [and] just tried to approach it from a very logical standpoint". On the title and premise, Yost explains that "There are seven days where S.H.I.E.L.D. had the worst week of their lives...you're seeing S.H.I.E.L.D.'s history and how it all leads right into Marvel's The Avengers, so we start in 1943 with Captain America and go all the way through all of the Marvel movies that you've seen to date". Pearson said, "Hopefully, [readers will] see the respect that the studio has for the cohesive universe. It's a comic book tying all of the events of several different features, and you really get to see how they're all in the same world." Yost added, "there's something going on behind the scenes [of the films] that people aren't aware of, and starting with this comic, you're going to become very aware of it". Yost noted that the comic "got the seal of approval" from Kevin Feige and Jeremy Latcham at Marvel Studios, "so this is the real deal" in terms of the MCU continuity. The concept of "Fury's Big Week" had been conceived by executive Brad Winderbaum when he was hired in October 2008, with one of his first tasks to create a timeline for the MCU.

The first of eight issues was released digitally on the Marvel Comics app on February 5 to coincide with the release of a new trailer for the film on that day. The rest of the issues were set to be released on the app each Tuesday beginning February 14. New Marvel editor-in-chief Axel Alonso described the comic as "an exciting story set in the Marvel Cinematic Universe that sets the stage perfectly" for the film. The comic introduced a red 'Avengers' stamp on its cover, indicating it as an official tie-in to the MCU. The comic was then published in hard copy as four chapters on March 7, March 21, April 4, and April 18, 2012.

== Plot ==
External image
- The Phase One Timeline infographic released by Marvel in May 2012, which shows the start, events, and end of Fury's Big Week.

The World Security Council shuts down S.H.I.E.L.D.'s search for Captain America's crashed plane in the Arctic, as well as the surveillance of Tony Stark and Bruce Banner / Hulk, in favor of Project Pegasus — S.H.I.E.L.D.'s attempts at exploiting the Tesseract — though Director Fury decides to continue these operations "off the books". Fury learns on the same day, that Stark is near death, Banner has entered the U.S., and there are unusual atmospheric disturbances above New Mexico. With S.H.I.E.L.D.'s help, Stark discovers a new element that saves his life, while Agents Coulson and Clint Barton discover Thor Odinson in New Mexico, and recover the remains of the Asgardian Destroyer armor there. Romanoff follows Banner to New York City, where, while the Hulk fights the Abomination, she discovers the mutating Samuel Sterns. A year later, S.H.I.E.L.D. is actively studying Sterns, Jane Foster's Nine Realms Theory, and the Destroyer — which they now have control over, and are developing into a handheld gun — and have been successful in their search for Captain America. Barton is assigned to watch Dr. Erik Selvig at Project Pegasus, who, using Stark's new element, is on the brink of harnessing the Tesseract's power, but who is also under the control of the Asgardian Loki.

== Reception ==
The series holds a rating of 8.0 on the review aggregation website Comic Book Roundup.

Fury's Big Week received praise from CJ Wheeler of Den of Geek, who thought the tone of the series was "a perfect fit for the Marvel Cinematic Universe so far and will get you stoked for what's to come." He described the writing as "punchy, suspenseful and funny. S.H.I.E.L.D. director Nick Fury and fan-favourite Agent Coulson get a chance to shine, with some great lines from both that could easily be delivered by Sam Jackson and Clark Gregg." Wheeler found the artwork to be "reliable", preferring that of Ross and Alves to the other artists for being "much more movie-like in style and panel-work".

== Prints ==
=== Issues and chapters ===
Issue numbers	Title	Cover date	Estimated sales (first month)
1–2	"Chapter One"	April 2012	19,829, ranked 92nd in North America
3–4	"Chapter Two"	May 2012	17,975, ranked 101st in North America
5–6	"Chapter Three"	June 2012	14,442, ranked 128th in North America
7–8	"Chapter Four"	June 2012	14,070, ranked 131st in North America

=== Collected editions ===
Title	Format	Material collected	Pages	Publication date	ISBN
Fury's Big Week	Trade paperback	Fury's Big Week #1-8	96	May 16, 2012	978-0785163411

== See also ==
- "What If... the World Lost Its Mightiest Heroes?", an episode of the MCU television series What If...? that reimagines the events of this comic book
