= Drax (Marvel Cinematic Universe) =

Marvel Cinematic Universe character

- Marvel Cinematic Universe character
- Dave Bautista as Drax in Guardians of the Galaxy
- First appearance: Guardians of the Galaxy (2014)
- Last appearance: Guardians of the Galaxy Vol. 3 (2023)
- Based on: Drax the Destroyer by Jim Starlin
- Adapted by: James Gunn; Nicole Perlman
- Portrayed by: Dave Bautista
- Voiced by: Fred Tatasciore (What If...?)

In-universe information
- Full name: Drax
- Alias: The Destroyer
- Species: Kylosian
- Occupation: Mercenary; Caretaker
- Affiliation: Guardians of the Galaxy
- Fighting style: Knife fighting with superhuman physiology
- Weapon: Dual knives; Various weapons including the Hadron Enforcer
- Spouse: Ovette
- Children: Kamaria (daughter)
- Home: Knowhere

Drax the Destroyer, often referred to simply as Drax, is a fictional character portrayed by Dave Bautista in the Marvel Cinematic Universe (MCU) media franchise, based on the Marvel Comics character of the same name. Drax is depicted as an imposing yet dimwitted warrior who seeks vengeance against the man who killed his family, Ronan the Accuser.

Drax joins the Guardians of the Galaxy in their battle against Ronan. He participates in the conflict against Thanos, falling victim to the Blip before being resurrected by the Avengers. Drax and the Guardians depart for space and come into conflict with the High Evolutionary before Drax retires to watch over the children of the newly established colony on Knowhere.

As of 2024, the character has appeared in six films and The Guardians of the Galaxy Holiday Special (2022) as well as the Disney+ animated series What If...? (2021) as alternate versions, voiced by Fred Tatasciore. Guardians of the Galaxy Vol. 3 (2023) was Bautista's final appearance as the character.

== Fictional character biography ==
=== Origin ===
Prior to 2014, Drax's homeworld was invaded by forces of Thanos under the command of Ronan the Accuser. The invaders killed Drax's family, setting him off on a path of revenge, resulting in him being captured and sent to a space prison called the Kyln.

=== Guardian of the Galaxy and facing Ego ===
In 2014, the other Guardians first encounter Drax in prison, where he has immediate hostility towards Gamora due to her connection with Ronan and Thanos. Drax attacks Gamora, but Peter Quill convinces him to spare her in return for her ability to draw Ronan to her, so that Drax can exact revenge. Drax helps the Guardians escape from prison, accompanying them to Knowhere, where he argues with Rocket and then drunkenly sends a signal out to challenge Ronan to fight. Ronan arrives, easily defeats Drax, and leaves with the Power Stone. Drax regrets his actions and joins the Guardians in defending Xandar from Ronan's attack. After Ronan's ship crashes, Drax and Rocket destroy Ronan's axe holding the Power Stone, and join Quill and Gamora in controlling the stone long enough to destroy Ronan. After the Nova Corps praise the Guardians for their actions, Gamora genuinely assures Drax that his family was avenged. He accepts her advice, although he acknowledges that Ronan was merely a pawn of Thanos, whom he now seeks revenge on.

Drax and the Guardians are later hired by the Sovereign to fight off an alien attacking their valuable batteries, in exchange for retrieving Gamora's sister Nebula. After they leave, they are chased by the Sovereign fleet, as Rocket had stolen their batteries, of which Drax was aware. After crash-landing on a planet, they meet Quill's father, Ego. Drax decides to accompany Quill and Gamora to Ego's planet, while Rocket, Groot, and Nebula stay behind. On Ego's planet, they meet his assistant Mantis, with whom Drax develops a friendship though he finds her hideous. When the Guardians find out about Ego's true self, Drax joins them in fighting Ego until Quill puts a jetpack on him and sends him away with an unconscious Mantis.

=== Infinity War and resurrection ===
In 2018, when the Guardians answer the distress call from Thor's destroyed spaceship and save Thor from floating in space, Drax accompanies Quill, Gamora, and Mantis to Knowhere in an attempt to prevent Thanos from gaining the Reality Stone. However, Thanos gets there first and uses the Reality Stone to briefly turn Drax into a pile of blocks. After Thanos takes Gamora and leaves, Drax reforms back into himself and accompanies Quill and Mantis to Titan, where they join with Avengers Tony Stark, Peter Parker, and Stephen Strange in an effort to defeat Thanos there, which ultimately fails due to Thanos' immense power with the partially assembled Infinity Gauntlet. Shortly after, Drax disintegrates due to the Blip.

In 2023, Drax is resurrected along with the other victims of the Blip. He is transported via a portal to Earth at the destroyed Avengers Compound to join the battle against an alternate 2014 Thanos and his army. Afterwards, Drax attends Stark's funeral, and along with the other Guardians and Thor, departs for space.

=== Final missions ===
In 2025, Drax and the rest of the Guardians, accompanied by Thor, return to space. They answer a distress call on Indigarr, where they learn about various distress calls brought about by the killing of the gods of various worlds. Following this, Thor splits up from them.

Few months later, the Guardians buy Knowhere from the Collector, and Drax helps as they work to refurbish it. When Quill is feeling depressed over the loss of his relationship with Gamora, Drax joins the Guardians in attempting to give him a meaningful Christmas by kidnapping Kevin Bacon as a gift for Quill. Drax and Mantis land in Hollywood, Los Angeles, inadvertently make money as buskers posing for pictures on the Hollywood Walk of Fame, and get drunk at a bar before a seller of star maps tells them where to find Kevin Bacon's house. Finding the house, Drax and Mantis chase Bacon and fight police officers before capturing Bacon and bringing him to Quill.

In 2026, after Knowhere is rebuilt, the Guardians are attacked by Adam Warlock and Rocket is seriously injured, leaving the Guardians unable to tend to his wounds due to a killswitch embedded in him. The team resolve to travel to the Orgoscope, headquarters of the High Evolutionary's company Orgocorp, in the hopes of finding an override code. Following a miscommunication with Quill, Drax, Mantis, and Nebula come across hordes of imprisoned children on the High Evolutionary's ship and are then captured by him. After escaping and defeating the High Evolutionary and his army, Quill and Mantis reveal they are leaving the team, and Nebula asks Drax to stay on Knowhere to raise the rescued children. Drax agrees to do so, and has a tearful goodbye with Mantis, before tending to the children.

== Alternate versions ==
Several alternate versions of Drax appear in the animated series, What If...?, where he is voiced by Fred Tatasciore.

- In an alternate 2014, Drax works as a bartender on Contraxia and is an admirer of Star-Lord T'Challa, who saved his homeworld and family from a Kree invasion.
- In an alternate 2011, Drax attends Thor's intergalactic party on Earth. He becomes upset when Thor calls on the partygoers to clean up their mess until Thor uses his powers to intimidate them into cleaning up while mentioning that Frigga is coming.
- In an alternate 2015, Drax, along with the other Guardians, are killed by Ultron on Sovereign.
- In another universe, Drax is a visitor of Howard the Duck's casino in Xandar. He is shown throwing a destructive tantrum after failing to hit the jackpot in a slot machine.
- Another universe's Drax is seen to have been captured by Doctor Strange Supreme for the Forge, but is freed by Captain Carter and returned home by Kahhori.

== Concept and creation ==
The comic book character, Drax the Destroyer, first appeared in The Invincible Iron Man #55 (February 1973), and was created by writers Jim Starlin and Mike Friedrich. He appeared in various Marvel series, and was "killed" several times. Drax received an eponymous 4 issue miniseries in 2004, and was a starring character in Annihilation: Nova #1–4 (2005) and Annihilation #1–6 (2006). After a follow-up appearance in Nova vol 4 #4–7 (2007) and the 2008 "Annihilation: Conquest" storyline, Drax was featured as a team member in the 2008 relaunch of the Guardians of the Galaxy. In the comics, Drax was originally Arthur Douglas, a human whose soul was placed in a superhuman body and tasked with killing Thanos after Thanos killed his wife and daughter.

Marvel Studios President Kevin Feige first mentioned Guardians of the Galaxy as a potential film at the 2010 San Diego Comic-Con, stating, "There are some obscure titles, too, like Guardians of the Galaxy. I think they've been revamped recently in a fun way in the [comic] book." Feige reiterated that sentiment in a September 2011 issue of Entertainment Weekly, saying, "There's an opportunity to do a big space epic, which Thor sort of hints at, in the cosmic side" of the Marvel Cinematic Universe. Feige added, should the film be made, it would feature an ensemble of characters, similar to X-Men and The Avengers. Feige announced that the film was in active development at the 2012 San Diego Comic-Con during the Marvel Studios panel, with an intended release date of August 1, 2014. He said the film's titular team would consist of the characters Star-Lord, Drax the Destroyer, Gamora, Groot, and Rocket.

In 2018, Bautista joined his castmates in support of Guardians of the Galaxy director James Gunn after his firing for old tweets joking about pedophilia and rape. Bautista declared that if Disney (parent company of Marvel Studios) did not use Gunn's script for Guardians of the Galaxy Vol. 3, he would ask to be recast, calling Gunn's firing "nauseating". Ultimately, Gunn was reinstated as director of the film in March 2019. Bautista indicated that at one point Gunn wanted to do "a Drax and Mantis film" as a spinoff, but that the concept was not pursued by Marvel.

=== Appearance and special effects ===
Bautista's makeup took approximately four hours to apply, though it could be removed in 90 minutes. Drax has various scarring patterns on his body, which replace the simple tattoos from the comics, each having a specific story. Additionally, his skin tone was changed from the bright green in the comics to a muddier grey, to avoid visual similarities to the Hulk.

For the second film, Bautista's makeup took only 90 minutes to apply, down from four hours for the first film. He would have to sit in a sauna at the end of the day to get the makeup off, after his makeup test was found to be too "abrasive".

== Characterization ==
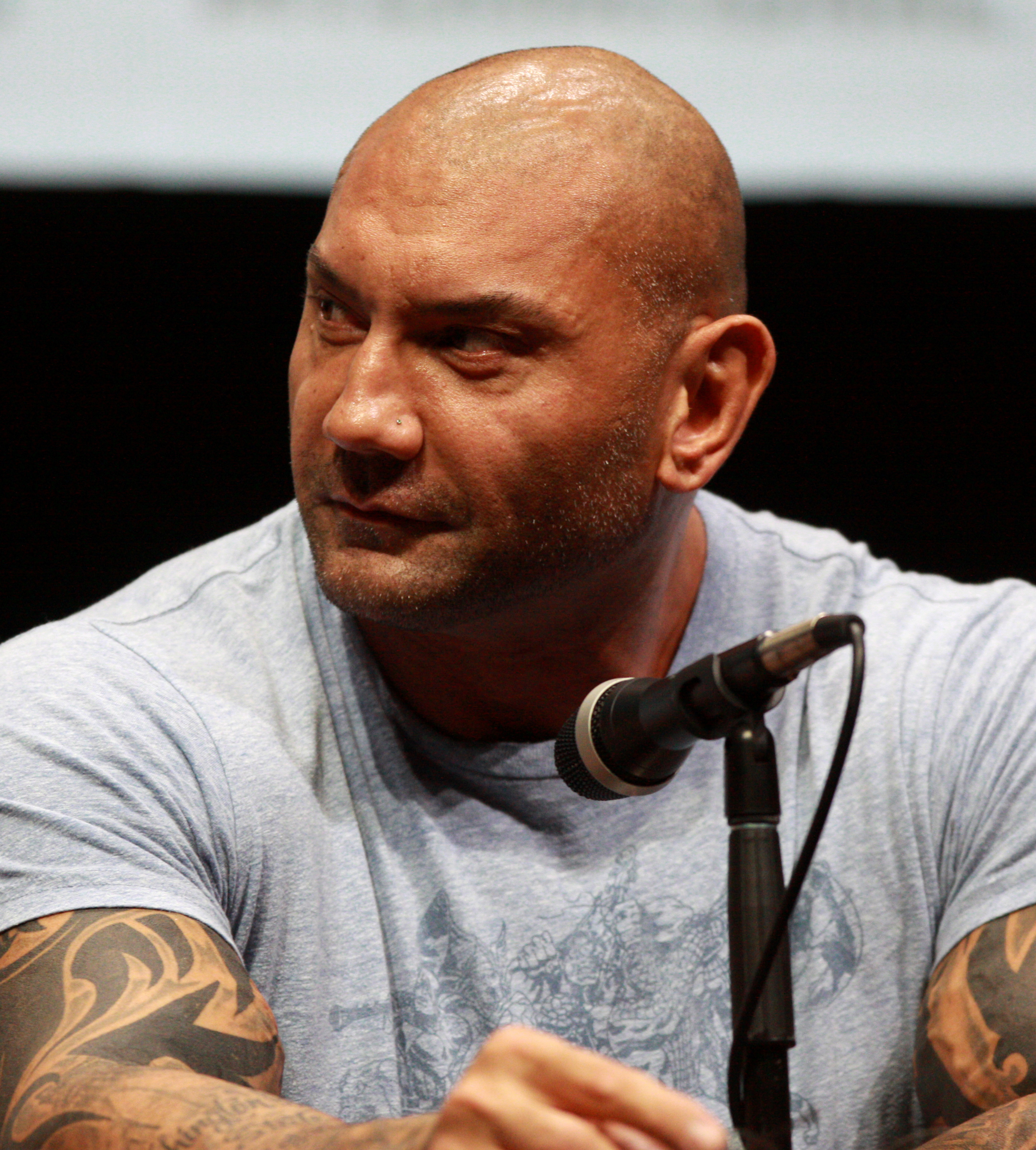
Dave Bautista portrays Drax

In Guardians of the Galaxy, Drax is characterized as a warrior who seeks to avenge his family's death at the hands of Ronan. On relating to the character, Bautista said, "I can just relate to Drax so much it's not even funny. Just the simple things that we have in common. Simple things like the tattoos, the tragedy—because, you know, I had a bit of tragedy in my life, as well. So it's really easy for me to pull from that." Bautista also said that there was "a lot of comic relief to Drax", but the character was not aware of it. Bautista stated that he did not do much preparation for the role, because "Luckily, for me, I'm a lifelong athlete and I adapted real quick".

In preparing for Guardians of the Galaxy Vol. 2, Bautista waited for the final version of the script so as to not take "away from the magic", which he felt had happened when he read early drafts of the first film. He added that "I wasn't crazy about my part [in Vol. 2, initially]. It went a different direction than what I thought they were going to go with Drax," noting he did not "think Drax was that significant in the film". The part "clicked" for Bautista after the table read with the other cast. Bautista called Drax "more funny, driven" than in the first film, and having "a sense of innocence and heartbreak about him", despite "most people's first perception of Drax [that] he's just a big, muscly brute".

Drax appears in "What If... T'Challa Became a Star-Lord?", an episode of What If...?, although voiced by Fred Tatasciore instead of Bautista. Bautista claimed he had not been asked to voice Drax in the series, although Marvel Studios vice-president Brad Winderbaum doubted this.

== Powers and abilities ==
Drax has superhuman strength and durability, and exceptional fighting skills. In Guardians of the Galaxy Vol. 2, he is dragged behind a flying spaceship as it crashes in a forest, and shows no sign of injury despite being smashed into multiple trees. In The Guardians of the Galaxy Holiday Special, he is repeatedly shot by a police officer with a handgun, which only tickles him. Afterwards, he easily flips a police car in the air and onto its back. Drax typically fights with a pair of long curved knives.

== In other media ==
=== Theme parks ===
Bautista reprises his role of Drax for the attractions Guardians of the Galaxy – Mission: Breakout! at Disney California Adventure and Guardians of the Galaxy: Cosmic Rewind at Epcot.

== Reception ==
Despite his rough exterior and tragic backstory, Drax commonly serves as comic relief, and his one-liners within the franchise have often been the subject of Internet memes.

== See also ==
- Characters of the Marvel Cinematic Universe
