= Characters of the Marvel Cinematic Universe =

Blu-ray artwork displaying various Infinity Saga protagonists with Thanos in the background

The Marvel Cinematic Universe (MCU) is an American media franchise and shared universe that involves productions of superhero films and television series. These productions star various titular superheroes; they are independently produced by Marvel Studios and are based on characters that appear in American comic books published by Marvel Comics. The shared universe, much like the original Marvel Universe in comic books, was established by crossing over common plots, settings, casts, and characters.

== Marvel Studios ==
- Characters of the Marvel Cinematic Universe: A–L
- Characters of the Marvel Cinematic Universe: M–Z

== Marvel Television ==
- Characters of Agents of S.H.I.E.L.D.
- Characters of Agent Carter
- Characters of Inhumans
- Characters of Daredevil
- Characters of Jessica Jones
- Characters of Luke Cage
- Characters of Iron Fist
- Characters of The Defenders
- Characters of The Punisher
- Characters of Runaways
- Characters of Cloak & Dagger
- Characters of Helstrom

== Overview of central characters ==
The film and television series of the Marvel Cinematic Universe (MCU) feature numerous central characters across its phases. The first three phases are collectively known as "The Infinity Saga", and the three following ones as "The Multiverse Saga".

Phase One is centered on six individuals who become the Avengers—Tony Stark, Steve Rogers, Thor, Bruce Banner, Natasha Romanoff, and Clint Barton. Other central characters include Nick Fury, leader of S.H.I.E.L.D. and creator of the Avengers; Phil Coulson, a high-ranking S.H.I.E.L.D. agent; and Loki, Thor's adopted brother whose plans to achieve world domination prompt Fury to assemble the Avengers.

Phase Two centers on the six original Avengers and Fury once again, though this time along with new members James Rhodes (introduced in Phase One), Sam Wilson, Wanda Maximoff, and the Vision. This phase also introduces Scott Lang and the Guardians of the Galaxy, which include Peter Quill, Gamora, Drax, Groot, and Rocket.

Phase Three brings back every central character of Phase One and Phase Two. It begins with a civil war between the Avengers caused by the ideological differences between Rogers and Stark; they are joined by Bucky Barnes (introduced in Phase One), Lang, T'Challa, and Peter Parker. Fury's origin is revealed while Loki's antagonistic role shifts to a more heroic one, with Thanos (introduced in Phase One) becoming this phase's main antagonist. Hope van Dyne (introduced in Phase Two) joins Lang as his superhero partner, Stephen Strange and Wong are introduced as members of the Masters of the Mystic Arts, and Nebula (introduced in Phase Two) and Mantis join the Guardians of the Galaxy. Female characters are given more screen time, with the Phase introducing Carol Danvers and giving heroic roles to Pepper Potts (introduced in Phase One), Okoye, Shuri, and Valkyrie. Meanwhile, Rogers returns to the past and reunites with Peggy Carter (introduced in Phase One). This phase concludes the story arcs of Stark, Romanoff, Loki, Gamora, and Thanos. Alternate and past versions of those characters return in later phases to varying degrees.

Phase Four deals with the fallout of the Infinity Saga on the lives of the remaining Avengers, while introducing new heroes such as Yelena Belova, Shang-Chi, Marc Spector and Steven Grant, Kamala Khan, Jennifer Walters, Riri Williams, Jack Russell, and the Eternals (including Sersi and Ikaris). Romanoff's backstory and Parker facing the consequences of his superhero secret identity being publicly revealed are explored, Maximoff learns to unlock her full power as the Scarlet Witch which eventually leads her into conflict with Strange, Wilson grapples with the difficulties of becoming the next Captain America, Barton passes the mantle of Hawkeye on to a young protégé named Kate Bishop, Jane Foster (introduced in Phase One) becomes the Mighty Thor, Sharon Carter (introduced in Phase Two) is revealed to have become the villainous Power Broker, and Shuri becomes the new Black Panther after T'Challa's sudden passing. A 2012 version of Loki (introduced in Phase Three) is arrested by the Time Variance Authority (TVA) and begins his own journey, exploring the concept of the multiverse, which is also overseen by the Watcher.

Phase Five continues to expand the multiverse further, giving a larger role to Kang the Conqueror and his alternate variants (introduced in Phase Four), while the Guardians of the Galaxy gain new members such as Kraglin Obfonteri and Cosmo the Spacedog (both introduced in Phase Two) as some of the old ones (Quill, Drax, Nebula, and Mantis) decide to leave the team, and Earth faces civil unrest due to the integration of the shapeshifting alien Skrulls (introduced in Phase Three) into human society. Danvers, Khan, and Monica Rambeau (introduced in Phase Three) team up as the Marvels, which inspires Khan to assemble a superhero team of her own, starting with Bishop. Maya Lopez (introduced in Phase Four) learns to unlock her Choctaw powers after confronting her past trauma, Wade Wilson and Logan (both introduced in 20th Century Fox's X-Men film series) embark on a journey of their own through the multiverse, and Agatha Harkness (introduced in Phase Four) forms a witch coven in order to face a magical set of trials. Thaddeus Ross (introduced in Phase One) becomes President of the United States while Wilson is warned of an upcoming multiversal attack on Earth. Matt Murdock resumes his role as a vigilante when crime lord Wilson Fisk (both introduced in Marvel's Netflix series) becomes the Mayor of New York City. Belova, Barnes, Ava Starr (introduced in Phase Three), John Walker and Alexei Shostakov (both introduced in Phase Four) become the New Avengers.

Phase Six introduces the Fantastic Four from Earth-828 (consisting of Reed Richards, Sue Storm, Ben Grimm, and Johnny Storm), the phase's main antagonist Victor von Doom, and Simon Williams. Vigilante Frank Castle (introduced in Marvel's Netflix series) reemerges to fight Fisk's Anti-Vigilante Task Force and the Gnucci crime family, before assisting Parker in stopping Jean Grey. Vision reunites with his and Wanda's lost sons Tommy and Billy Maximoff (both introduced in Phase Four) after stopping the genocidal AI Ultron (introduced in Phase Two).

== Reception ==
The depiction of adapted and original characters in the MCU has been generally positively received, with the portrayal of superhero protagonists mostly positive. IGN opined, "With heroes ranging from super-spies to super-soldiers to space raccoons, the MCU has gifted us with some of the most memorable champions in movie history." Meanwhile, reception of the MCU's depiction of its villains has been more mixed, with some media outlets coining the term "villain problem" to describe this shortcoming. Collider described the villains as "Achilles' heel" of the shared universe, with Phase One and Phase Two most commonly criticized for having weak or unmemorable villains. The villains of Phase Three were hailed as an improvement over the villains of the previous two Phases, while villains of Phase Four have also been praised.

In an analysis of the MCU's villains, Michael Burgin of Paste opined that it was "probably still fair to say their track record has been less consistent with the bad guys than with the good", believing that this was due to "a reluctance to embrace the established look and character of the villain" and the differences from their source material. Angelo Delos Trinos of Comic Book Resources further elaborated on this, opining that "the MCU has been widely praised for its characters and storylines" but has "mistreated some villains and wasted the potential they have in comics", remarking on the wasted potential of some of the supervillains within the franchise in comparison to their comic book counterparts. Alternatively, Looper described the MCU's villains as "fairly compelling criminals", while Eric Diaz of Nerdist described them as being unappreciated despite being the weakest part of the franchise.

Some villains were more well received than others, with Screen Rant elaborating on which villains were "loved" and "hated" from the fans of the franchise. Carolina Darney of SB Nation explained, "Some of the villains — hello, Vulture — are fantastic. They're well-rounded, they have depth, and there seems to be a method to their madness. Then there are the other villains. Their backgrounds aren't particularly explained, you're not entirely sure what they're doing — looking intently at you, Malekith — and motivations seem weak at best."

== See also ==
- Teams and organizations of the Marvel Cinematic Universe
- Species of the Marvel Cinematic Universe
- Lists of Marvel Cinematic Universe cast members
