= Peter Quill (Marvel Cinematic Universe) =

Character in the Marvel Cinematic Universe

- Marvel Cinematic Universe character
- Chris Pratt as Peter Quill / Star-Lord in Guardians of the Galaxy Vol. 2 (2017).
- First appearance: Guardians of the Galaxy (2014)
- Based on: Star-Lord by: Steve Englehart; Steve Gan
- Adapted by: James Gunn; Nicole Perlman
- Portrayed by: Chris Pratt; Wyatt Oleff (young)
- Voiced by: Brian T. Delaney (What If...?); Luke Klein (young, The Guardians of the Galaxy Holiday Special); Mace Montgomery Miskel (young, What If...?)

In-universe information
- Full name: Peter Jason Quill
- Alias: Star-Lord
- Species: Human–Celestial hybrid
- Occupation: Captain of the Guardians of the Galaxy; Mercenary; Smuggler
- Affiliation: Guardians of the Galaxy; Ravagers
- Fighting style: Marksmanship with alien firearms
- Weapon: Double-barrel blaster pistol; Various alien gadgets
- Family: Meredith Quill (mother); Jason Quill (grandfather); Ego (biological father); Yondu Udonta (adoptive father); Mantis (half-sister)
- Significant other: Gamora (Note: Original timeline version prior to her death depicted in Avengers: Infinity War (2018).)
- Origin: St. Charles, Missouri, United States

Peter Jason Quill, also known by his alias Star-Lord, is a fictional character portrayed primarily by Chris Pratt in the Marvel Cinematic Universe (MCU) media franchise, based on the Marvel Comics character of the same name. Quill is initially depicted as a member of the mercenary group called the Ravagers who was abducted from Earth as a child by Yondu Udonta after his mother died. Quill becomes the leader of the Guardians of the Galaxy after they assemble out of necessity to stop Ronan the Accuser from destroying Xandar.

He discovers that he is a Celestial hybrid and that his father, Ego, created him as a means to xenoform planets. Quill and the Guardians defeat Ego, and he develops a romantic relationship with Gamora. Quill participates in the conflict against Thanos, which results in Gamora's death and Quill becomes a victim of the Blip. He is resurrected by the Avengers and joins in the final battle against Thanos. Quill and the Guardians depart for space, eventually coming into conflict with and defeating the High Evolutionary. Quill leaves the Guardians to return to Earth, reuniting with his grandfather.

As of 2024, Quill has appeared in six films and the television special The Guardians of the Galaxy Holiday Special (2022). The character and Pratt's portrayal have been met with positive reception.

Alternate versions of Quill from within the MCU multiverse appear in Avengers: Endgame (2019), portrayed by Pratt, and in the animated series What If...? (2021), voiced by Brian T. Delaney.

== Fictional character biography ==
=== Origin ===
Peter Quill was born in 1980 in St. Charles, Missouri. His father was the Celestial Ego (a fact of which Peter does not become aware until later in life), while his mother, Meredith, was a human from Missouri. As a child in 1988, Peter watches as his mother is dying from cancer. Unable to deal with it, he runs away and is abducted by the extraterrestrial spaceship of a mercenary gang called the Ravagers, led by Yondu Udonta. Although Yondu has been hired to deliver Peter to Ego, being aware of Ego's monstrous intentions, he instead keeps the boy and raises him as a surrogate son. Due to his own harsh upbringing, Yondu is stern with Peter, but also affectionate. At one point, he scoffs at a young Peter's attempt to celebrate Christmas, destroying his Christmas tree and throwing away his gifts, but later relents and opens the gift Peter gave him, gifting Peter a set of blasters in return.

=== Creating the Guardians of the Galaxy ===
26 years later, an adult Quill is a member of the Ravagers, and has had many adventures around the galaxy. While on a scavenging job, Quill finds himself embroiled in a significant power struggle and revenge war between two advanced galactic powers, the Kree warlord Ronan the Accuser and Xandar's Nova Corps, while also being hunted by Yondu after failing to bring him a stolen relic he found on Morag (later revealed to be an Infinity Stone).

After he successfully retrieves the Power Stone, he returns to Xandar, where he is confronted by Gamora, who attempts to steal the Stone for herself, and Rocket and Groot, who attempt to capture Quill to collect a bounty on him. After a fight breaks out, the four are sent to a Nova Corps prison called the Kyln. They break out with another cellmate named Drax the Destroyer and escape on Quill's spaceship, where they become the Guardians of the Galaxy. Gamora takes them to Knowhere, where the Collector explains the significance of the Infinity Stones. However, they are attacked by Ronan's forces and forced to flee, losing the Power Stone in the process. Learning that Ronan plans to use the Power Stone to completely destroy Xandar, they travel there to stop him, with the help of Yondu and the Ravagers. After a battle between Ronan's army and the Nova Corps, the Guardians manage to destroy Ronan's warship. Quill initiates a dance-off to distract Ronan while the others blast Ronan's axe to free the Power Stone, which they are able to use to disintegrate Ronan. In the end, Quill and the Guardians are hailed as heroes as he vows to keep an eye on the team in case they break any laws again. Throughout the film, Quill is shown listening to a mixtape of various hit songs from 1962 – 1979 in a Walkman that was given to him by his mother, which serves as his only connection with Earth.

=== Meeting Ego ===
A few months later, Quill and the Guardians are hired by the Sovereign to fight off an alien attacking their valuable batteries, in exchange for Nebula. After learning that Rocket stole some of the Sovereign's batteries, which causes their war fleet to attack, they crash land on a planet, where Quill meets his father, Ego, a primordial Celestial who manifests a human avatar that allows him to interact with other races. Quill, Gamora, and Drax go with Ego to his planet where they meet his ward Mantis. Ego informs Quill that he too possesses his Celestial abilities. Quill is initially happy to have found his father and to have family again, however, it is eventually revealed that Ego intends to xenoform all other planets into extensions of himself, killing all other life, and had conceived Quill with the intention that his son would provide the extra power necessary to do so. After Ego reveals that he killed his mother, Quill turns against him. Quill keeps Ego occupied in combat with his newfound Celestial powers until Baby Groot places a bomb on Ego's brain. After Ego dies and Quill loses his Celestial powers, he is rescued from the planet's destruction by Yondu, who reveals himself as an adopted father to Quill. In space, Yondu gives Quill the last space suit, sacrificing his life to save him. The Guardians hold a memorial and give Yondu an honorable funeral, as the Ravagers arrive to pay respect. Quill also replaces his Walkman, which Ego had destroyed, with a Zune, and both Quill and Gamora confess their feelings for each other and start a relationship.

=== Infinity War and resurrection ===
Four years later, Quill and the Guardians respond to a distress signal and end up rescuing Thor, who is floating in space amidst the wreckage of the Statesman. Thor informs them that Thanos has begun his quest for the six Infinity Stones, with the Power Stone and Space Stone already in his possession. Quill takes Gamora, with whom he is now in a romantic relationship, to Knowhere, accompanied by Drax and Mantis. On the way, Gamora makes him promise to kill her if Thanos ever captures her, to prevent him from learning the Soul Stone's location which she only knows. On Knowhere, however, Gamora is captured by Thanos, but Quill fails to kill her as he had promised, because of Thanos' use of the Reality Stone as he leaves with Gamora. Quill, Drax, and Mantis travel to Titan and meet Tony Stark, Peter Parker, and Stephen Strange, in a brief confrontation in which they realize they are on the same side. They fight Thanos when he arrives and gain the upper hand, with Mantis subduing him with her powers, until Quill learns of Gamora's death from Nebula and grievously attacks Thanos, breaking Mantis' hold. Thanos is then able to obtain the Time Stone from Strange and depart Titan to finish assembling the Infinity Gauntlet. When Thanos snaps his fingers, Quill, along with Drax, Mantis, Parker, and Strange, fall victim to the Blip.

In 2023, Quill is restored to life and is brought through a portal to the destroyed Avengers Compound in upstate New York, where he participates in the final battle against an alternate version of Thanos. There, Quill meets an alternate Gamora, who being from a time period before she met the Quill and the Guardians, rejects his affection. A week later, Quill attends Stark's funeral at his house. Quill then starts searching for where the alternate Gamora went and arrives in Norway to pick Thor up. As the team returns to space, they suggest that he should fight Thor for the honor of leadership, a suggestion that both he and Thor jokingly dismiss.

=== Return to space and buying Knowhere ===
Throughout 2024, Quill and the Guardians welcome Kraglin to the team, help Thor lose weight, and embark on several cosmic adventures. In 2025, Quill and the Guardians arrive in Indigarr to respond to a signal from a tribe of Indigarrians, which had been attacked by Habooksa the Horrible and his Booskan army. Severely outmatched, the Guardians enlist the help of Thor, who had been busy meditating. Quill cheers on Thor as the latter joins the fight, easily besting the Booskan army but destroying the Indigarrians's sacred temple in the process. On their ship, they learn of a god butcher and see Sif's distress call, leading Thor to decide to leave them to respond to it, with Quill giving him words of advice before they part ways.

A few months later, Quill and the Guardians meet with the Collector and buy Knowhere from him, as well as gain a new member of the team, Cosmo. However, Quill remains depressed about losing Gamora. At Christmastime, Mantis and Drax try to cheer him up by kidnapping the actor Kevin Bacon and giving him to Quill as a gift. Quill makes them free Bacon, who then decides to stay and help the Guardians celebrate Christmas. Afterward, Mantis reveals that she is Quill's half-sister, which brings Quill joy.

=== Saving Rocket and leaving the Guardians ===
In 2026, Quill has fallen into deep alcoholism, depressed over losing Gamora. Quill is put to sleep by Nebula, but shortly after, Adam, a superpowered being created out of revenge by his "mother" and the empress of the Sovereign, Ayesha, arrives and attacks them. Quill springs into action after Rocket gets seriously injured, leaving the Guardians unable to tend to his wounds due to a kill switch embedded in him. Quill and the team resolve to travel to the Orgoscope, headquarters of the High Evolutionary's company Orgocorp, in the hopes of finding an override code. With the assistance of the Ravagers and a reluctant alternate Gamora, they infiltrate the Orgosphere and retrieve Rocket's file. However, they are attacked by the Orgosphere's guards, barely escaping after Quill remotely activates the guards' suit jetpacks.

The team next visit Counter-Earth against alternate Gamora's advice, who angrily bails out on them. Quill, Nebula, and Groot trace Orgocorp scientist Theel to the High Evolutionary's ship. The ship begins to launch with Quill and Groot onboard, and the pair successfully defeat the High Evolutionary's men and capture Theel, jumping off with him and retrieving his memory before alternate Gamora meets them with their ship. On the Guardians' ship, Rocket flatlines, but Quill successfully implements the override code and revives him. Quill calls Kraglin and asks him to bring Knowhere to the High Evolutionary's ship. As the team subdues the High Evolutionary and rescues the children and animals being held on his ship with Cosmo's help, Quill barely escapes, beginning to freeze in space before being rescued by Adam.

Afterward, Quill bids farewell to alternate Gamora, accepting that she is not his Gamora. He leaves the Guardians and bestows the rank of captain upon Rocket before leaving for Earth, where he reunites with his grandfather Jason in Missouri.

== Alternate versions ==
Other versions of Quill are depicted in the alternate realities of the MCU multiverse.

=== 2014 variant ===
In an alternate 2014, Quill arrives on Morag dancing to his music but is knocked unconscious by War Machine.

=== What If...? (2021–2024) ===
Several alternate versions of Quill appear in the animated series What If...?, in which he is voiced by Brian T. Delaney.

- In an alternate 1988, the Ravagers members Kraglin and Taserface mistakenly abduct T'Challa instead of Quill much to the dismay of Yondu. As a result, Quill spends the next twenty years living a normal life on Earth in Missouri. In 2008, while working as a Dairy Queen janitor, he is visited by Ego, who introduces himself as his father as the episode ends. Ego begins to drain Quill's Celestial powers and xenoform the universe. Quill is then saved by T'Challa, before he is recruited by the Watcher to the Guardians of the Multiverse. Following the defeat of Ultron, Quill joins T'Challa in the fight against his father using his own quad blaster.
- In an alternate 2015, Quill, along with the other Guardians of the Galaxy, are killed by Ultron when defending the Sovereign. The same thing occurs in a second alternate universe with a similar variant of Ultron.
- In an alternate 1988, young Peter Quill was delivered by Yondu Udonta to his father Ego, who influenced him into attacking and destroying other worlds for the Expansion. When Earth was next, Peter was met with the resistance of King T'Chaka / Black Panther, Hank Pym / Ant-Man, Bill Foster / Goliath, Thor, Bucky Barnes / Winter Soldier and Mar-Vell / Wendy Lawson. Initially loyal to his father, Peter eventually has a change of heart after meeting Hank's daughter Hope (with whom he forms a close bond) and after visiting his mother Meredith's grave, where Hank (who sympathizes with Peter over his loss of his mother) convinces Peter to stand against Ego. Peter destroys Ego's physical body and joins a mission to go after Ego's planetary form. He is later kidnapped and imprisoned by Doctor Strange Supreme who seeks to sacrifice universe killers and righteous heroes both to his machine, the Forge, in order to restore his destroyed universe. However, Captain Carter sets everyone free and Kahhori later returns them all home.
- Another alternate Peter Quill is seen amongst Doctor Strange Supreme's prisoners in the Sanctum Infinitum.

== Concept and creation ==
The comic book character first appeared in the black-and-white magazine publication Marvel Preview #4 (Jan 1976). Creator Steve Englehart established the character as "an unpleasant, introverted jerk" who was intended to evolve into "the most cosmic being in the universe", but this development went unrealized after Englehart left Marvel. Star-Lord continued to appear in Marvel Preview, with writer Chris Claremont revamping the character and using science fiction adventure stories like the Heinlein juveniles for inspiration. Star-Lord made sporadic appearances over the next few years in various titles, with the character playing a central role in the "Annihilation: Conquest" crossover storyline, and the second volume of the 2008 run of Guardians of the Galaxy, featuring a team led by Star-Lord for the duration of the title's 25-issue run.

Marvel Studios President Kevin Feige first mentioned Guardians of the Galaxy as a potential film at the 2010 San Diego Comic-Con, stating, "There are some obscure titles, too, like Guardians of the Galaxy. I think they've been revamped recently in a fun way in the [comic] book." Feige reiterated that sentiment in a September 2011 issue of Entertainment Weekly, saying, "There's an opportunity to do a big space epic, which Thor sort of hints at, in the cosmic side" of the Marvel Cinematic Universe. Feige added, should the film be made, it would feature an ensemble of characters, similar to X-Men and The Avengers. Feige announced that the film was in active development at the 2012 San Diego Comic-Con during the Marvel Studios panel, with an intended release date of August 1, 2014. He said the film's titular team would consist of the characters Star-Lord, Drax the Destroyer, Gamora, Groot, and Rocket.

== Characterization ==
Quill is introduced in Guardians of the Galaxy as the half-human, half-alien leader of the Guardians who was abducted from Missouri as a child in 1988 and raised by a group of alien thieves and smugglers called the Ravagers. Pratt was cast in the role in February 2013, as part of a multi-film deal that he signed with Marvel. About the character, Pratt said, "He had a hard time as a kid, and now he goes around space, making out with hot alien girls and just being a rogue and a bit of a jerk, and through teaming up with these guys, finds a higher purpose for himself." He also added that the character is a mix of Han Solo and Marty McFly. Pratt, who was mostly known for playing supporting characters, including Andy Dwyer on the television series Parks and Recreation, initially turned down the role. Pratt had lost weight to portray fit characters in films such as Moneyball and Zero Dark Thirty, and had given up ambitions to play the lead role in action films after humbling auditions for Star Trek and Avatar. Casting director Sarah Finn suggested Pratt to Gunn, who dismissed the idea despite struggling to cast that role. Despite this, Finn arranged for a meeting between the two, at which point Gunn was immediately convinced that Pratt was perfect for the role. Pratt also won over Feige, despite having gained weight again for Delivery Man. Prior to filming, Pratt underwent a strict diet and training regimen to lose 60 pounds (27 kg) in six months. Pratt signed a multi-film contract with Marvel, and was granted a temporary leave from his work on Parks and Recreation to accommodate his participation in the film. Wyatt Oleff portrayed a young Quill in this film, and again in Guardians of the Galaxy Vol. 2.

In Guardians of the Galaxy Vol. 2, Pratt said that Quill is now famous throughout "the galaxy for having saved so many people... He feels like he's part of this group, a leader of this group. He's a little more responsible and trying to stay out of trouble, but not necessarily doing the best job." Pratt stated that working on the film forced him to come to terms with the death of his own father. Pratt described his role in his next appearance, in Avengers: Infinity War, as a "guest star" appearance and said "you get to be a little more vibrant; a little more irreverent; a little bit more colorful if you want it to be".

Pratt said that Thor: Love and Thunder would continue the rivalry between Quill and Thor that was established in Infinity War and Endgame.

== In other media ==
=== Theme parks ===
Pratt reprises his role of Quill for the attractions Guardians of the Galaxy – Mission: Breakout! at Disney California Adventure and Guardians of the Galaxy: Cosmic Rewind at Epcot.

== Reception ==
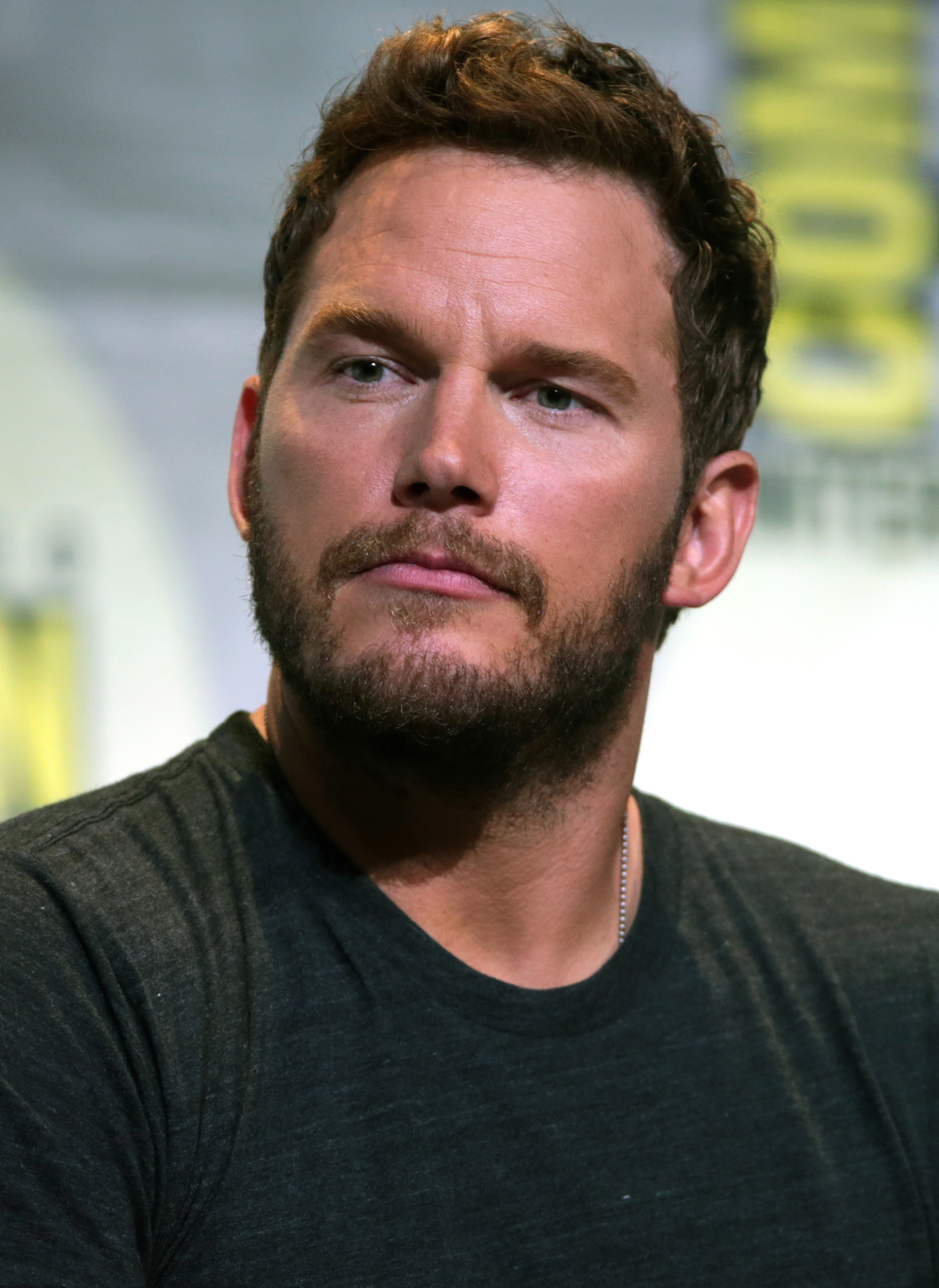
Pratt at the 2016 San Diego Comic-Con

In a 2014 review for the first Guardians of the Galaxy, Scott Foundas of Variety said, "James Gunn's presumptive franchise-starter is overlong, overstuffed, and sometimes too eager to please, but the cheeky comic tone keeps things buoyant—as does Chris Pratt's winning performance".

=== Awards and nominations ===
Year	Association	Category	Nominated work	Result	Ref.
2014	CinemaCon Awards	Breakthrough Performer of the Year	Guardians of the Galaxy	Won	
2014	Young Hollywood Awards	Super Superhero	Guardians of the Galaxy	Nominated	
2014	Detroit Film Critics Society	Best Ensemble	Guardians of the Galaxy	Won	
2014	Detroit Film Critics Society	Breakthrough Performance	Guardians of the Galaxy	Nominated	
2015	Critics' Choice Movie Awards	Best Actor in an Action Movie	Guardians of the Galaxy	Nominated	
2015	MTV Movie Awards	Best Male Performance	Guardians of the Galaxy	Nominated	
2015	MTV Movie Awards	Best Shirtless Performance	Guardians of the Galaxy	Nominated	
2015	MTV Movie Awards	Best Musical Moment	Guardians of the Galaxy	Nominated	
2015	MTV Movie Awards	Best Comedic Performance	Guardians of the Galaxy	Nominated	
2015	MTV Movie Awards	Best Hero	Guardians of the Galaxy	Nominated	
2015	Kids' Choice Awards	Favorite Male Action Star	Guardians of the Galaxy	Nominated	
2015	Saturn Awards	Best Actor	Guardians of the Galaxy	Won	
2017	Teen Choice Awards	Choice Movie Actor: Sci-Fi	Guardians of the Galaxy Vol. 2	Won	
2017	Teen Choice Awards	Choice Movie: Ship (with Zoe Saldaña)	Guardians of the Galaxy Vol. 2	Nominated	
2018	Teen Choice Awards	Choice Liplock (with Zoe Saldana)	Avengers: Infinity War	Nominated	
2024	Saturn Awards	Best Actor	Guardians of the Galaxy Vol. 3	Nominated	
2024	People's Choice Awards	The Male Movie Star of the Year	Guardians of the Galaxy Vol. 3	Nominated	
2024	People's Choice Awards	The Action Movie Star of the Year	Guardians of the Galaxy Vol. 3	Nominated	
2024	Kids' Choice Awards	Favorite Movie Actor	Guardians of the Galaxy Vol. 3	Nominated	

== See also ==
- Characters of the Marvel Cinematic Universe
