= Thor (Marvel Cinematic Universe) =

Character in the Marvel Cinematic Universe

- Marvel Cinematic Universe character
- Chris Hemsworth as Thor in Thor: The Dark World (2013)
- First appearance: Thor (2011)
- Based on: Thor by: Stan Lee; Larry Lieber; Jack Kirby
- Adapted by: Ashley Miller; Zack Stentz; Don Payne; J. Michael Straczynski; Mark Protosevich
- Portrayed by: Chris Hemsworth; Dakota Goyo (young); Tristan Hemsworth (young); Samson Alston (teenager); Cameron Chapek (infant)

In-universe information
- Full name: Thor Odinson
- Alias: Donald Blake
- Species: Asgardian
- Titles: God of Thunder; King of New Asgard (formerly); King of Asgard (formerly); Prince of Asgard (formerly)
- Affiliation: Asgardian Royal Family; Avengers; Guardians of the Galaxy; Revengers
- Weapon: Mjolnir; Stormbreaker; Gungnir; Zeus' thunderbolt
- Family: Odin (father); Frigga (mother); Hela (half-sister); Loki (adoptive brother)
- Significant other: Jane Foster (ex-girlfriend)
- Children: Love (adoptive daughter)
- Origin: Asgard, Nine Realms
- Nationality: Asgardian
- Abilities: Godlike strength, stamina, durability, speed, agility, reflexes, healing factor, longevity, and senses; Manipulation of weather, lightning, thunder, energy and matter; Skilled hand-to-hand combatant; Mjolnir and Stormbreaker grants: Lightning Manipulation; Energy Absorption and Projection; Flight; Interdimensional teleportation via Bifrost Bridge

Thor Odinson is a character portrayed by Chris Hemsworth in the Marvel Cinematic Universe (MCU) media franchise, based on the Marvel Comics character and Norse mythological deity of the same name. He is depicted as the God of Thunder and one of the most powerful Asgardians, an ancient alien civilization with long ties to Earth whose members are considered gods by humans. Thor wields a powerful hammer called Mjolnir and is initially portrayed as the arrogant heir to the throne of Asgard whose brash behavior causes turmoil among the Nine Realms under Asgard's protection. This brings him into conflict with his treacherous adoptive brother, Loki.

Thor commits himself to the protection of Earth, and becomes a founding member of the Avengers. He eventually becomes the King of Asgard after Odin's death, but the entire realm is destroyed during the battle with his sister Hela. Thor then comes into conflict with Thanos, who slaughters half of the Asgardians and uses the Infinity Stones to erase half of the life in the universe before Thor himself kills Thanos. Thor later joins his fellow Avengers in obtaining the Stones from the past using time travel and they successfully undo Thanos' actions. When an alternate version of Thanos enters their timeline, Thor and the Avengers manage to defeat him. Thor then passes the crown of New Asgard to Valkyrie and joins the Guardians of the Galaxy for a brief time. Thor comes into conflict with Gorr the God Butcher and the Olympian god Zeus, while reconnecting with his terminally ill ex-girlfriend, the now Mjolnir-wielding Jane Foster. After Foster succumbs to her cancer to assist in Gorr's defeat, Thor adopts the latter's daughter, Love.

Thor is a central figure of the MCU, having appeared in nine films as of 2024. Thor's characterization and early films received mixed reception, however his storyline following Thor: Ragnarok (2017) was received much more favorably, with that film often being credited as revitalizing the character and his arc.

Alternate versions of Thor appear in the animated series What If...? (2021), with Hemsworth reprising the role. One version in particular, which depicts an alternate Thor raised without Loki who is recruited into the Guardians of the Multiverse by the Watcher in the battle against an alternate version of Ultron.

== Character biography ==
=== Early life ===
Thor was born approximately 1500 years ago to Odin, the King of Asgard, and Frigga. He was raised on Asgard as the crown prince, alongside his brother, Loki.

=== Banishment to Earth ===
In 2011, Thor prepares to ascend to the throne, but Frost Giants attempt to retrieve the Casket of Ancient Winters, an artifact seized by Odin in a war centuries before. Against Odin's order, Thor travels to Jotunheim to confront Frost Giant leader Laufey, accompanied by Loki, childhood friend Sif, and the Warriors Three: Voltstagg, Fandral, and Hogun. A battle ensues until Odin intervenes, destroying the fragile truce between the two races. For Thor's arrogance, Odin strips his son of his godly power and exiles him to Earth. Odin casts an enchantment on Mjolnir, ensuring that only those who are worthy may wield the hammer. Thor lands in New Mexico, meeting scientist Dr. Erik Selvig, astrophysicist Dr. Jane Foster, and Foster's intern Darcy Lewis. Thor resigns himself to exile on Earth, where he develops a relationship with Foster. Odin enters the "Odinsleep", a period of rest needed to maintain his power, and Loki, having learned he is actually an adopted Frost Giant, seizes the Asgardian throne and prepares to conquer the Nine Realms. The Warriors Three and Sif find Thor, but the Destroyer attacks and defeats them, prompting Thor to offer himself instead. Struck by the Destroyer and near death, Thor's selflessness proves him worthy to wield Mjolnir. The hammer returns to him, restoring his powers and enabling him to defeat the Destroyer. Thor returns to Asgard and fights Loki before destroying the Bifröst Bridge to stop Loki's plans, stranding himself in Asgard. Odin prevents the brothers from falling into the abyss, but Loki appears to commit suicide when Odin rejects his pleas for approval. Thor makes amends with Odin, admitting he is not ready to rule.

=== Joining the Avengers ===
In 2012, Odin sends Thor back to Earth using dark magic after learning Loki is alive and is attempting to conquer the Earth. He finds Loki on a Quinjet, held captive by Tony Stark, Steve Rogers, and Natasha Romanoff. Thor takes Loki away, hoping to convince him to abandon his plan. However, Stark and Rogers pursue Thor and after a brief confrontation, Thor agrees to take Loki to S.H.I.E.L.D.'s flying aircraft carrier, the Helicarrier. Agents including Clint Barton, who were mind controlled by Loki, attack the Helicarrier, disabling one of its engines in flight and causing Bruce Banner to transform into the Hulk. Thor attempts to stop the Hulk's rampage and both are ejected from the Helicarrier as Loki escapes. Thor then becomes a founding member of the Avengers upon returning to help Rogers, Stark, Banner, Romanoff, and Barton when Loki uses the Tesseract to open a wormhole over New York City to allow a Chitauri army to invade. Thor and the Avengers fight off the Chitauri and save the city. After Loki is defeated at Stark Tower, Thor returns to Asgard with Loki and the Tesseract.

=== Battle with the Dark Elves ===
In 2013, having used the Tesseract to rebuild the Bifrost and bring the Nine Realms to peace, Thor and his fellow warriors learn that the Convergence of the realms is imminent, with portals linking the worlds appearing at random. Heimdall alerts Thor that Jane Foster has left his near all-seeing vision, leading Thor to go to Earth. Jane inadvertently releases an unearthly force, and Thor returns with her to Asgard. Odin recognizes this force as a weapon known as the Aether, warning that it will kill Jane, and that its return heralds a catastrophic prophecy. The Dark Elves, led by Malekith, attack Asgard, searching for Jane. Thor's mother Frigga is killed protecting Jane, and Malekith is forced to flee. Against Odin's orders to stay in Asgard, Thor reluctantly frees Loki, who knows a secret portal to Svartalfheim, home of the Dark Elves, in return for Thor's promise to take vengeance for their mother. In Svartalfheim, Loki tricks Malekith into drawing the Aether out of Jane, but Thor's attempt to destroy the exposed substance fails. Malekith merges with the Aether and leaves in his ship as Loki is fatally wounded. Thor and Jane return to London through another portal. Thor ultimately defeats Malekith in a battle in Greenwich, and returns to Asgard to decline Odin's offer to take the throne, and tells Odin of Loki's sacrifice. Thor then returns to Earth and reunites with Jane.

=== Ultron and the Battle of Sokovia ===
In 2015, Thor and the Avengers raid a Hydra facility in Sokovia and find Loki's scepter. Back at Avengers Tower, Stark and Banner discover an artificial intelligence within the scepter's gem, and secretly decide to use it to complete Stark's "Ultron" global defense program. After the Avengers host a celebratory party and Thor reveals he and Jane have ended their relationship, the unexpectedly sentient Ultron attacks Thor, James Rhodes, and the other Avengers before escaping with the scepter. The team tracks Ultron down in Johannesburg, but Wanda Maximoff subdues them with hallucinatory visions. Following this, Thor and the team go to Barton's home to recover, however, Thor leaves them in order to consult with Selvig on the meaning of the apocalyptic future he saw in his hallucination. Thor and Selvig go to a mystical well, where Thor has a vision of the Infinity Stones, the most powerful objects in existence. Returning to the Tower, Thor finds out that Stark secretly uploaded J.A.R.V.I.S. into a synthetic vibranium body captured from Ultron and helps activate the body, dubbed the Vision, explaining that the gem on his forehead is one of the six Infinity Stones. Thor and the team return to Sokovia where they engage in the final battle against Ultron and manage to defeat him. At the new Avengers Compound, Thor tells Rogers and Stark that he is leaving to go back into space to learn more about the forces he suspects have manipulated recent events and leaves Earth using the Bifrost.

=== Ragnarok ===
In 2017, Thor is imprisoned in Muspelheim by Surtur. Surtur claims he will destroy Asgard in the prophesied Ragnarök, when his crown is placed into the Eternal Flame in Odin's vault. Thor escapes, fights and defeats Surtur and retrieves the crown, believing he has prevented Ragnarök. While returning the crown to Asgard, he finds Loki still alive and posing as Odin. He takes Loki back to New York City. With the help of Stephen Strange, they find a dying Odin in Norway, who explains that his passing will allow his firstborn child, Hela, to escape from a prison she was sealed in millennia ago. She appears, destroys Mjolnir and forces Thor and Loki from the Bifrost out into space. Thor crash-lands on the planet Sakaar, and is captured by Valkyrie, a former member of the ancient Asgardian order of Valkyries defeated by Hela. Thor is forced to compete in the Grandmaster's Tournament of Champions and he befriends fellow gladiators, Korg and Miek. After the fight with Hulk, Thor finds the Quinjet that brought Hulk to Sakaar. A video recording of Romanoff helps Hulk transform back into Banner and after convincing Valkyrie and Loki to help, they escape through a wormhole to Asgard – but not before Loki betrays his brother, and is left behind on Sakaar. In the midst of the battle with Hela's forces, Loki returns aboard the Grandmaster's vessel, the Statesman. He and Heimdall help Asgardians escape into the ship. Thor, facing Hela, loses an eye and through a vision of Odin realizes his true potential and unlocks his hidden powers but soon realises that Ragnarok is the only way to stop Hela. He has Loki place Surtur's crown in the Eternal Flame, and Surtur destroys Asgard and Hela. Thor, crowned king, decides to take his people to Earth, but they are intercepted by Sanctuary II, Thanos' warship.

=== Combating Thanos and the Infinity War ===
On a destroyed Statesman, Thor is threatened by Thanos using the Power Stone, until Loki gives him the Space Stone within the Tesseract. Before he does, he calls on the Hulk, but Thanos overpowers Hulk and kills Heimdall. After Loki is killed by Thanos, Thor clutches his brother's body as Thanos obliterates the Statesman leaving Thor to die in the open space. Thor survives and is rescued by the Guardians of the Galaxy — Peter Quill, Gamora, Drax the Destroyer, Mantis, Rocket, and Groot — and they tell Thor about Thanos' quest to find the Infinity Stones and erase half of all life in the universe. Needing a new weapon, Thor leaves in a space pod with Rocket and Groot to Nidavellir, and Rocket gives Thor a cybernetic replacement eye. They find that Nidavellir has been ravaged by Thanos and meet the dwarf king Eitri. Thor repairs the damaged forge, and they work together to create Stormbreaker, a powerful axe that also grants Thor the power of the Bifrost. Thor transports himself, Rocket, and Groot to Wakanda on Earth to help Rogers, Romanoff, Banner, Rhodes, Sam Wilson, Bucky Barnes, T'Challa, and the Wakandan army in the battle against the Outriders. Thor is able to defeat scores of Outriders and uses Stormbreaker to severely wound Thanos in the chest. However, Thanos tells Thor that he should have gone for the head and manages to activate the completed Infinity Gauntlet by snapping his fingers, initiating the Blip. Thanos teleports away and Thor is left to watch in horror when Barnes, Maximoff, Wilson, T'Challa, and Groot disintegrate.

=== Avenging the fallen and the Time Heist ===
Thor, along with the surviving Avengers and Rocket, return to the Avengers Compound to assess the damage. Three weeks later, Thor goes with Rogers, Romanoff, Banner, Rhodes, Rocket, Carol Danvers and Nebula into space to Titan II to confront Thanos. After discovering that Thanos destroyed the Stones to prevent further use, an enraged Thor decapitates him with Stormbreaker. Sometime between 2018 and 2023, Thor and the remaining Asgardians settle in Tønsberg, Norway where they create a colony called New Asgard. Thor becomes an overweight alcoholic as a result of his trauma.

In 2023, Rocket and Banner arrive in New Asgard and urge Thor to return to the Avengers and hear their plan to undo Thanos' actions. Thor returns to the Compound, reuniting with the Avengers, and learns of the plan to time travel via the Quantum Realm to collect the Infinity Stones from different points in the past. He and Rocket travel to Asgard in an alternate 2013 where he meets an alternate Frigga, who reignites Thor's sense of purpose, and he borrows an alternate version of Mjolnir. Upon returning, the original Avengers hold a silent mourning for Romanoff, who sacrificed herself to obtain the Soul Stone. After Banner restores the lives Thanos erased, an alternate version of Thanos from 2014 travels through the Quantum Tunnel and attacks the Avengers Compound. Thor, Stark and Rogers confront and battle Thanos, with Rogers proving worthy to wield Mjolnir during the battle. After the restored Avengers, Guardians, Asgardians, Ravagers, Masters of the Mystic Arts and the Wakandan army arrive, Thor participates in the final battle against Thanos and his army. In the end, Stark sacrifices himself to kill Thanos and his forces. Afterward, Thor attends Stark's funeral. While Rogers returns the alternate Stones and Mjolnir to their respective timelines, Thor returns to New Asgard, where he makes Valkyrie the new ruler and leaves with the Guardians of the Galaxy into space.

=== Fighting Gorr the God Butcher and beyond ===
Thor spends a period of time with the Guardians of the Galaxy and reattains his muscular physique. In 2024, Thor helps them fight off an alien army on the planet Indigarr. Afterwards, they learn of distress calls throughout the galaxy and he parts ways with them to respond to a distress signal from Sif. Upon arrival, a beaten Sif warns Thor of Gorr, a being possessing the god-killing weapon, the Necrosword, seeking the extinction of all gods and that his next target is New Asgard.

Dr. Jane Foster, Thor's ex-girlfriend who is diagnosed with terminal cancer arrives at New Asgard in hopes of seeking medical treatment. Thor's destroyed hammer Mjolnir re-forges and bonds itself to Foster, granting her its power after years earlier Thor had unknowingly enchanted it to protect her. Thor arrives in New Asgard just as Gorr starts attacking the town with shadow creatures. He is surprised to find Foster with Mjolnir but nevertheless teams up with her, Valkyrie and Korg to fight Gorr. The group thwarts Gorr, but he escapes, kidnapping several Asgardian children.

The group travels to Omnipotent City to warn the other gods and ask for their help. The Olympian god Zeus is unwilling to help and has Thor captured, forcing the group to fight off Zeus's men. Zeus injures Korg; in anger, Thor impales Zeus with his own thunderbolt, which Valkyrie steals during their escape. They then travel to the Shadow Realm to save the children. However, this turned out to be a ruse for Gorr to take Stormbreaker, which he intends to use on the Bifrost to enter Eternity and ask for the destruction of all gods. Gorr manages to overpower Thor's group and successfully steal Stormbreaker. Gorr uses Stormbreaker to open the portal to Eternity. Valkyrie is badly injured and Foster ends the battle drained by her use of Mjolnir, which has exacerbated her cancer. Thor goes alone, using Zeus's thunderbolt to imbue the kidnapped Asgardian children with his power to fight alongside him. Foster arrives and joins Thor in fighting Gorr and destroys the Necrosword.

Admitting defeat, Thor manages to convince Gorr that all he wanted from Eternity was not to destroy the gods but to get his daughter back. Foster succumbs to her illness and dies in Thor's arms. Eternity allows Gorr's request to revive Love, and he asks Thor to take care of before he dies. The children return to New Asgard, where Valkyrie and Sif begin training them. Meanwhile, by 2025, Thor, now once again in possession of Mjolnir, continues to go on adventures to planets to help people, with Love (who calls him her "Uncle Thor"), now wielding Stormbreaker, by his side. At some later, unspecified point in time, Thor would meet mutant mercenary Wade Wilson and comfort him in his arms after being wounded.

== Alternate versions ==
Other versions of Thor are depicted in the alternate realities of the MCU multiverse.

=== What If...? (2021–24) ===
Several alternate versions of Thor appear in the animated series What If...?, with Hemsworth reprising his role.

- In an alternate 2011, while seeking Mjolnir at a S.H.I.E.L.D. base following his banishment from Asgard, Thor is seemingly shot dead by Clint Barton by accident, though it is later revealed that his death was orchestrated by a vengeful Hank Pym in his Yellowjacket alias.
- In another alternate 2011, Thor is raised as an only child due to Odin giving an infant Loki back to Laufey and grows up to be a boisterous prince who prefers spending his time partying. While Odin falls into the Odinsleep and Frigga visits her sisters, Thor hosts a large intergalactic party on Earth in Las Vegas, with attendees including a version of Loki who is a Prince of the Frost Giants and good friends with Thor, the Sovereign, the Ravagers, Surtur, Korg, Nebula, Drax, the Grandmaster, and Howard the Duck. In response, S.H.I.E.L.D. Acting Director Maria Hill summons Danvers for assistance, but Thor refuses to leave and the two engage in a battle. Thor subdues Danvers and continues partying with his fellow alien partygoers, destroying human relics and locations such as Stonehenge and the Statue of Liberty. Thor also meets Foster and establishes a romantic relationship with her. While he is partying, she contacts Frigga to discipline Thor before he does more damage. Thor is alerted to Frigga's impending arrival and intimidates his partygoers to clean up the damage they caused when he mentions that Frigga is coming. They succeed in undoing the damages. Frigga arrives to find him studying with his fellow Asgardians and the Midgardians. When he calls forth Mjolnir, he finds it defaced as Frigga shakes her head. Afterward, Thor visits Foster at her van and invites her on a date, only to be interrupted by an Ultron from another universe wielding the Infinity Stones. As he then fights off the Ultron Sentries, he is recruited by the Watcher into the Guardians of the Multiverse to defeat Ultron. While in another universe, Thor accidentally alerts Ultron to their presence prematurely, and are transported to Ultron's home universe following a brief battle. Joined by Natasha Romanoff, the team fights Ultron and manage to defeat him, and Thor returns to his home reality and reunites with Foster.
- In an alternate 2015, Thor, along with Stark, Rogers, and Banner, are killed by Ultron who had successfully uploaded his consciousness into a new Vibranium body.
- In an alternate 1988, Thor is on the hunt for Peter Quill and his father Ego for destroying most of the Nine Realms (including Jotunhelm and Asgard). He arrives on Earth and joins forces with the heroes sent after Quill to stop Ego from destroying Earth with his seed.
- In an alternate 2014, Thor shows up at the last minute after Happy Hogan and the Avengers stop Justin Hammer from taking over the Avengers tower during the Christmas party and thinks he missed it.
- In an alternate 2012, Thor joins the Avengers, consisting of Captain Carter, Stark, Barton, Romanoff, and Hope van Dyne. He participates in the Battle of New York.
- In an alternate 1602, Thor was the Prince and watched Loki perform on stage. However, after the universe experienced an incursion, a tear in the universe, Queen Hela was swept away. Thor was named the new King and obtained the Scepter, which carried the Time Stone. Believing that Captain Carter had failed in her role there, Thor sent Hogan and the Royal Yellowjackets to find her. Later, he and Loki witnessed Carter's return, along with Rogers, Lang, and Barnes. As another tear opened up, the Scarlet Witch held it back, as Carter confronted him over the Scepter, leading him to fight her. Fury eventually stole the Scepter, which allowed Carter to put the Stone in Stark's device and show that Rogers' displacement was causing the incursion. Carter sent him back to his universe, saving Thor's universe.
- Multiple variants of Thor were held prisoner in Doctor Strange Supreme's Sanctum Infinitum; when Captain Carter released Strange's prisoners, two of them immediately began fighting each other. Later, one of them gives Kahhori his version of Mjolnir, to help her fight Strange, before she returns him to his own universe.

=== Zombie Apocalypse ===
In an alternate 2018, Thor accompanied Rocket and Groot in battling against Thanos, who was caught up by the zombie infection. After Thanos kills Groot and Rocket, Thor is seriously injured before attempting to break the Infinity Gauntlet. In the present day, Thor finds himself in New Asgard, devastated by his defeat, after Valkyrie greets Shang-Chi, Kamala Khan, and the other survivors. However, the Queen of Sokovia, revealed to be Zombie Wanda, the Queen of the Dead, tricks the Asgardians into giving them food that is actually zombie remains, turning him into a zombie as well. Thor battles Zombie Wanda, allowing the remaining heroes to escape on the Asgardian spaceship beyond the atmosphere, where they activate the beacon. Thor, also a zombie, faces a Hulk exposed by the Infinity Stones' energy as an "Infinity Hulk", until Thor is destroyed by him.

=== Other versions ===
- In an alternate 2012, Thor and the Avengers are victorious over Loki during the Battle of New York. However, when the time travelling Tony Stark and Scott Lang from 2023 arrive to steal the Tesseract, they alter 2012-Thor's history when they cause 2012-Stark to have a cardiac dysrhythmia. 2012-Thor uses Mjolnir to save 2012-Stark's life, but the incident inadvertently causes Loki to gain access to the Tesseract which he uses to escape by teleporting away, leaving 2012-Thor with concern and confusion.
- In an alternate reality, Thor (voiced by Chris Hemsworth) is turned into a frog and is later sent to the Void by the Time Variance Authority (TVA). This version is dubbed "Throg".
- In an alternate universe, Thor, along with the other Avengers, were all killed by Kang the Conqueror, who conquered their universe during the Multiversal War.
- The MCU TV series Hawkeye features a fictional in-universe performance of Rogers: The Musical, a Broadway musical featuring an actor playing Thor wielding a prop Mjolnir.

== Concept, creation, and characterization ==
Thor debuted as a Marvel Comics superhero in the science fiction/fantasy anthology title Journey into Mystery #83 (cover-date August 1962), created by editor-plotter Stan Lee, scripter Larry Lieber, and penciller-plotter Jack Kirby. Kirby said, "I created Thor at Marvel because I was forever enamored of legends, which is why I knew about Balder, Heimdall, and Odin. I tried to update Thor and put him into a superhero costume, but he was still Thor." Lee and Kirby included Thor in The Avengers #1 (Sept. 1963) as a founding member of the superhero team. A live-action television adaptation of the comic book character first appeared in the 1988 television film The Incredible Hulk Returns. Live-action film adaptations of the character were thereafter proposed, but did not come to fruition. In the mid-2000s, Kevin Feige realized that Marvel still owned the rights to the core members of the Avengers, which included Thor. Feige, a self-professed "fanboy", envisioned creating a shared universe just as creators Stan Lee and Jack Kirby had done with their comic books in the early 1960s.

Mark Protosevich, a fan of the Thor comic book, agreed to write the script in April 2006, and the project moved to Paramount Pictures, after it acquired the rights from Sony. In December 2007, Protosevich described his plans for it "to be like a superhero origin story, but not one about a human gaining super powers, but of a god realizing his true potential. It's the story of an Old Testament god who becomes a New Testament god". Marvel Studios signed Matthew Vaughn to direct the film. Vaughn then rewrote Protosevich's script in order to reduce the budget. In September 2008, Kenneth Branagh entered into negotiations to direct, and by December 2008, Branagh confirmed that he had been hired. He described it as "a human story right in the center of a big epic scenario." In October 2008, Daniel Craig was offered the role, but ultimately turned it down, citing his commitments to the James Bond franchise.

In May 2009, Chris Hemsworth was in negotiations to portray the title role after a back-and-forth process in which the 25-year-old actor was refused early on, then given a second chance to read for the part. Hemsworth's brother, Liam also auditioned for the role, but was passed on by Marvel Studios head Kevin Feige. Feige mentioned that the film would take place on both modern day Earth and Asgard but Thor's human host, Dr. Donald Blake, would not be included. Hemsworth stated that he gained 20 pounds for the role by eating non-stop and revealed that "It wasn't until Thor that I started lifting weights, it was all pretty new to me."

=== Characterization ===
Regarding his take on the character, Hemsworth said, "We just kept trying to humanize it all, and keep it very real. Look into all the research about the comic books that we could, but also bring it back to 'Who is this guy as a person, and what's his relationship with people in the individual scenes?'" About approaching Thor's fighting style, he remarked, "First, we looked at the comic books and the posturing, the way [Thor] moves and fights, and a lot of his power seems to be drawn up through the ground. We talked about boxers, you know, Mike Tyson, very low to the ground and big open chest and big shoulder swings and very sort of brutal but graceful at the same time, and then as we shot stuff things became easier." Dakota Goyo portrays a young Thor in the first film.

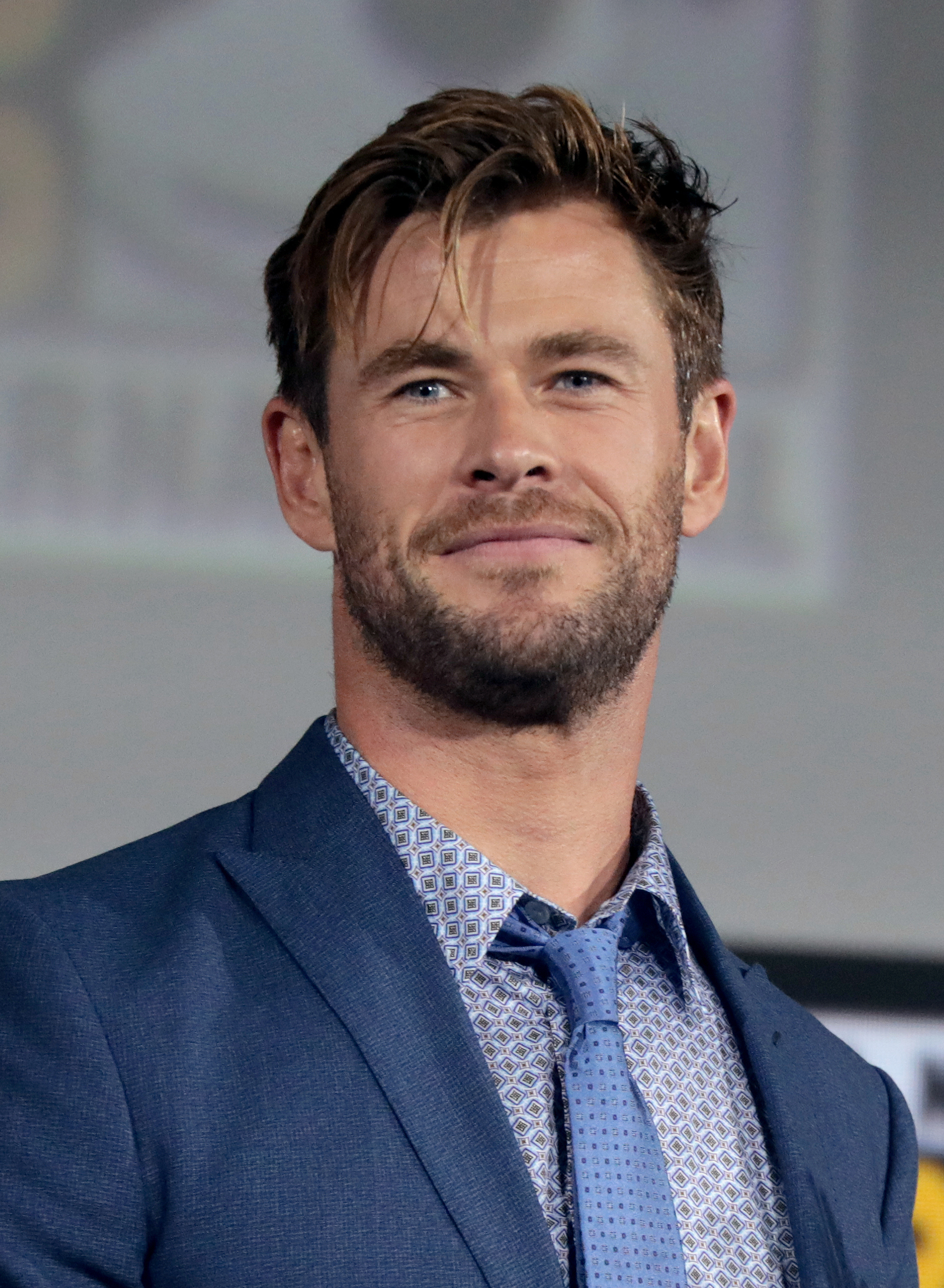
Chris Hemsworth at the 2019 San Diego Comic-Con.

For The Avengers, Hemsworth said that he was able to maintain the strength he built up for Thor by increasing his food intake, consisting of chicken breasts, fish, steak, and eggs every day. When asked exactly how much, Hemsworth said, "My body weight in protein pretty much!" He remarked that Thor's motivation "is much more of a personal one, in the sense that it's his brother that is stirring things up. Whereas everyone else, it's some bad guy who they've gotta take down. It's a different approach for me, or for Thor. He's constantly having to battle the greater good and what he should do vs. it's his little brother there. . . I've been frustrated with my brothers at times, or family, but I'm the only one who is allowed to be angry at them. There's a bit of that."

According to Hemsworth, in Thor: The Dark World, "for Thor and Jane, there are some unanswered questions now, since obviously he didn't stop in and catch up with her in The Avengers. Thor might have some explaining to do in this one. And with Loki, we get down to the major bones of our conflict with everything that's come from Thor to Avengers to now". Hemsworth added, "Thor's journey I think picks more so up from where we left the first one—About to take on the throne... and now coming to the realization of what responsibility comes with that. Also, Alan [Taylor] keeps talking about the dark side of that responsibility, and the secrets of being king or becoming sort of very political about what people need to know and what they want to know." Hemsworth especially enjoyed the role of Thor in this film as he was able to, "... break him down and find his human qualities and his vulnerable side."

Hemsworth stated that Age of Ultron shows Thor as having remained on Earth since the events of The Dark World, and has begun to feel at home here, therefore considering Ultron's threat a personal attack. Hemsworth stated that he had to work harder to bring new elements to the character to avoid repeating himself, saying that it "gave us room to kind of make him a little more grounded and human and have him in some civilian clothes and mixing it up at a party". Hemsworth noted that Thor's motivations in this film were completely different, as it was the first MCU film where he did not play against Loki.

By the events of Thor: Ragnarok, Thor has become a "lone gunslinger" searching for the Infinity Stones. Hemsworth had become "a bit bored" with the character by this time, and wanted to take some risks and experiment: the character has shorter hair in the film, wears a different outfit, his hammer Mjolnir is destroyed, and he loses an eye. Director Taika Waititi added that "stripping" the character down like this allowed him to become a refugee at the end of the film. Waititi also wanted to use more of Hemsworth's comedic talents showcased in films like Vacation (2015) and Ghostbusters (2016), and cited Kurt Russell's portrayal of Jack Burton from Big Trouble in Little China (1986) as an influence on the character.

The events of Infinity War come right on the heels of Ragnarok, finding Thor in a "very profound... very interesting place" with "real emotional motivation". At the recommendation of Hemsworth, writers Christopher Markus and Stephen McFeely consulted Thor: Ragnarok director Taika Waititi and screenwriter Eric Pearson to help carry over the comedic and tragic elements of the re-toned Thor from that film. Joe Russo said that Thor has "the driving hero's arc of the movie which stands in direct opposition to Thanos' argument" and would have been the main protagonist of the film had Thor killed Thanos. Thor's character in Infinity War has been criticized as a step backwards from his portrayal in his previous appearance in Ragnarok. Thor learns in Ragnarok that his power does not come from Mjolnir, only to spend the bulk of Infinity War pursuing the creation of a new, more powerful weapon.

Following his failure to kill Thanos in Infinity War, Thor becomes an overweight, drunken ruler of Asgard's refugees in Tønsberg, Norway. Referencing this drastic character change, Hemsworth said, "I just had an opinion. I wanted to do something different this time. Each film I've wanted to, in particular, the last couple, and they were on board," and added, "We shot for many hours and days and discussed how far could we push (Thor) and what we could do different." Anthony Russo added, "Even though there's a lot of fun to be had in the movie with his physical condition, it's not a gag. It's a manifestation of where he is on a character level, and we think it's one of the most relatable aspects of him. I mean, it's a very common sort of response to depression and pain." Thor's story was his favorite arc, saying, "Part of Chris' magic as a comedic actor is his dedication to the depth of the character on a very earnest level...It's so devious and subversive when comedy is coming from a place of complete commitment and emotional complexity." Hemsworth underwent around three hours of hair and makeup for the transformation, which also required him to wear a large silicone prosthetic suit; he called himself "Lebowski Thor" on set. Thor was initially supposed to revert to his "old chiseled self" in the middle of Endgame, but Hemsworth successfully argued in favour of retaining Thor's aged physique.

In Thor: Love and Thunder, director Taika Waititi said that Thor is going through a midlife crisis in the film, as he is "just trying to figure out his purpose, trying to figure out exactly who he is and why he's a hero or whether he should be a hero". Chris Pratt said Love and Thunder would continue the rivalry between Guardians leader Peter Quill / Star-Lord and Thor that was established in Infinity War and Endgame. Thor has a large tattoo on his back that memorializes his family and friends that have previously died.

Thor is noted to have a number of character flaws, which occasionally drive events in the MCU. He is initially impulsive, invading Jotunheim, the home of the frost giants, in the first film. This leads directly to Odin banishing him to Earth, and indirectly to Loki's attempt to overthrow Asgard after Loki learns that he was born a frost giant and adopted by Odin. It is noted, however, that from this experience, Thor "emerges a more humble warrior". The events of Thor also lead to Loki encountering Thanos, in whose service Loki invades Earth in The Avengers. Although Thor's arrogance has been tempered since his first film, he still shows flashes of impulsiveness such as when he attacks Steve Rogers at their first meeting in The Avengers. Analysis of the character from a feminist perspective has noted that Thor "might be a hotheaded braggart, but he never demeans women", a sharp contrast with the womanizing Tony Stark.

=== Mjolnir and Stormbreaker ===
Love wields the axe Stormbreaker and Thor wields the hammer Mjolnir in a scene from Thor: Love and Thunder.

With respect to his signature weapons, both Mjolnir and Stormbreaker can be summoned by Thor, and will return to his hand after being thrown. Both weapons also enable Thor to fly, and to channel his power to summon lightning. Stormbreaker has the additional power to summon the Bifröst, allowing Thor to teleport anywhere in the Nine Realms. According to Marvel's Infinity War, Stormbreaker also has the power to "even defeat the powers of the Infinity Stones", as shown at the end of that film when Thor overpowers and very nearly solo-kills Thanos with the axe despite the latter having all Six Stones. Screen Rant has identified Stormbreaker as the more powerful of the two, based on this ability, as well as it being a much larger and edged weapon. Both weapons also appear to have a degree of sentience, with Stormbreaker apparently being envious of Thor's affection for Mjolnir, a characteristic director Taika Waititi attributed to the handle being made from the arm of the adolescent Groot, and carrying over some of that character's moodiness at that age.

In the MCU, Mjolnir initially belonged to Thor's sister Hela, who used it in battle alongside her own weaponry to subjugate the Nine Realms alongside Odin. However, Odin banished her to Hel once his expansionist desires faded. Over one thousand years later, Mjolnir is seen in Odin's vault alongside other artifacts, and it is wielded by Thor in most of his MCU appearances. The post-credit scene in Iron Man 2 and a scene from the second episode of the Disney+ TV series What If...? are the only MCU media in which Mjolnir appears while Thor does not. Mjolnir was shown being destroyed in Thor: Ragnarok, but in January 2022, it was reported that promotional artwork for the forthcoming fourth Thor movie, Thor: Love and Thunder, showed that the destroyed version of Mjolnir had been remade (albeit with visible cracks), and was now being wielded by a worthy Jane Foster. In the film, a flashback reveals that years earlier, Thor unknowingly enchanted Mjolnir to protect Foster. When Foster is diagnosed with terminal cancer, she researches the possibility that Mjolnir gives its wielder enhanced strength and stamina. She travels to New Asgard in search of the remnants of Mjolnir, which reassembles itself in Jane's presence and proclaims her worthy, surprising Thor when he meets her again as the new wielder of the hammer. Foster, thereby having the power of Thor, uses the alias of Mighty Thor and wields the reconstructed version of the hammer in battle against Gorr the God Butcher and his forces, and against soldiers of Zeus while visiting Omnipotence City. The reconstructed hammer, when launched from its wielder, can separate into its fragments to hit multiple targets at once before reassembling. In one comedic moment, Thor tries to summon Mjolnir, but Stormbreaker enters the room, with Thor reacting as if Stormbreaker were jealous.

=== Appearance and special effects ===
Thor's appearance has changed from each film to the next. For the first film, Visual Development Supervisor Charlie Wen focused on mixing elements from the comic books with Norse mythology in creating Thor's costume, keeping the six disk-shaped adornments on his upper body, but "trying to maintain the Norse side of things" as much as possible. The first design element that Wen attempted was Thor's hammer, Mjolnir, for which Wen created a number of possible alternatives, incorporating designs including "the traditional Thor hammer with the short handle as well as the Ultimates versions", from which the one Branagh chose "was the most traditional one". In a 2018 interview with Jimmy Kimmel, Thor actor Chris Hemsworth revealed that he has kept a number of the prop hammers created for the film. For The Avengers, Thor's costume was modified slightly to fit in better with other members of the team, and to make his movements and appearance in casual scenes more natural, with changes including enhancing the blue tones in the costume, and reducing the size of Thor's cape. Various efforts to depict Thor dressed in "street clothes" like people of Earth have been criticized as having him look like "an extra in Cameron Crowe's Singles".

The concept artist tasked with designing the MCU version of Stormbreaker, Ryan Meinerding, decided to deviate substantially from the design of Stormbreaker used in the comics, feeling that "the original Stormbreaker looked a bit too much like the original Mjolnir". Consequently, Stormbreaker "more closely resembles the Mjolnir from the Ultimate Marvel run than the original Stormbreaker hammer bestowed upon Thor's rival turned ally Beta Ray Bill". Meinerding intentionally made Stormbreaker comparatively oversized and overpowered, to convey that the wielder of the weapon must also be someone incredibly powerful.

== Appearances ==
=== Feature films ===
Chris Hemsworth stars as the character in the Marvel Cinematic Universe, first appearing in Thor (2011), and subsequently appearing in The Avengers (2012), Thor: The Dark World (2013), Avengers: Age of Ultron (2015), Thor: Ragnarok (2017), Avengers: Infinity War (2018), Avengers: Endgame (2019), and Thor: Love and Thunder (2022). Hemsworth also cameos in the mid-credits scene of Doctor Strange (2016). In September 2020, Hemsworth stated that he wished to continue playing Thor after Love and Thunder, saying, "I'm not going into any retirement period" pointing out that the character was "way too young for that".

=== Television series ===
- Archival footage of the character appears in the Disney+ television series Loki (2021), including an improvised homage to the "Another!" scene in Thor in the episode "Lamentis".
- Hemsworth voices variants of the character in the Disney+ animated series What If..? (2021).
  - Greg Furman voices a variant from the zombie apocalypse in Marvel Zombies

== Differences from the comic books ==
A major divergence from the comic books is the absence of Thor's comic book alter ego, Donald Blake, although he uses the name 'Donald Blake' as a pseudonym during his time on Earth in Thor, an Easter egg homage to the comics. In the comics, as in the MCU, Odin stripped Thor of his powers and sent him to Earth as punishment for Thor's arrogance and intemperance. However, in the comics, Odin puts Thor into the body of Donald Blake, a crippled human doctor, for the course of a long-running storyline, encompassing years of adventures during which Thor's alter ego is occasionally able to cause Thor to re-emerge to fight villainy. In the MCU, with no element of an alter ego, this banishment is resolved within the first film, over the course of days. The lack of an alter ego also impacts Thor's relationships. In the comics, Thor's love interest, Jane Foster, is an assistant to Donald Blake. In the films, she has no prior connection to the character, and meets him due to her work as a physicist studying the type of phenomena his appearances generate.

Another significant difference from the comic books is the destruction of Thor's hammer, Mjölnir, in the MCU and the origin of its replacement, Stormbreaker. In the comics, Stormbreaker is created by the dwarf Eitri by Odin's decree, to be given to the character Beta Ray Bill, after Bill fights Thor in hand-to-hand combat to determine who should possess Mjölnir. In the MCU, Thor himself assists Eitri in creating Stormbreaker as a replacement for the destroyed Mjölnir, to use as a weapon with which to face Thanos, though he does later retrieve Mjölnir for a brief period while travelling through time.

== Reception and impact ==
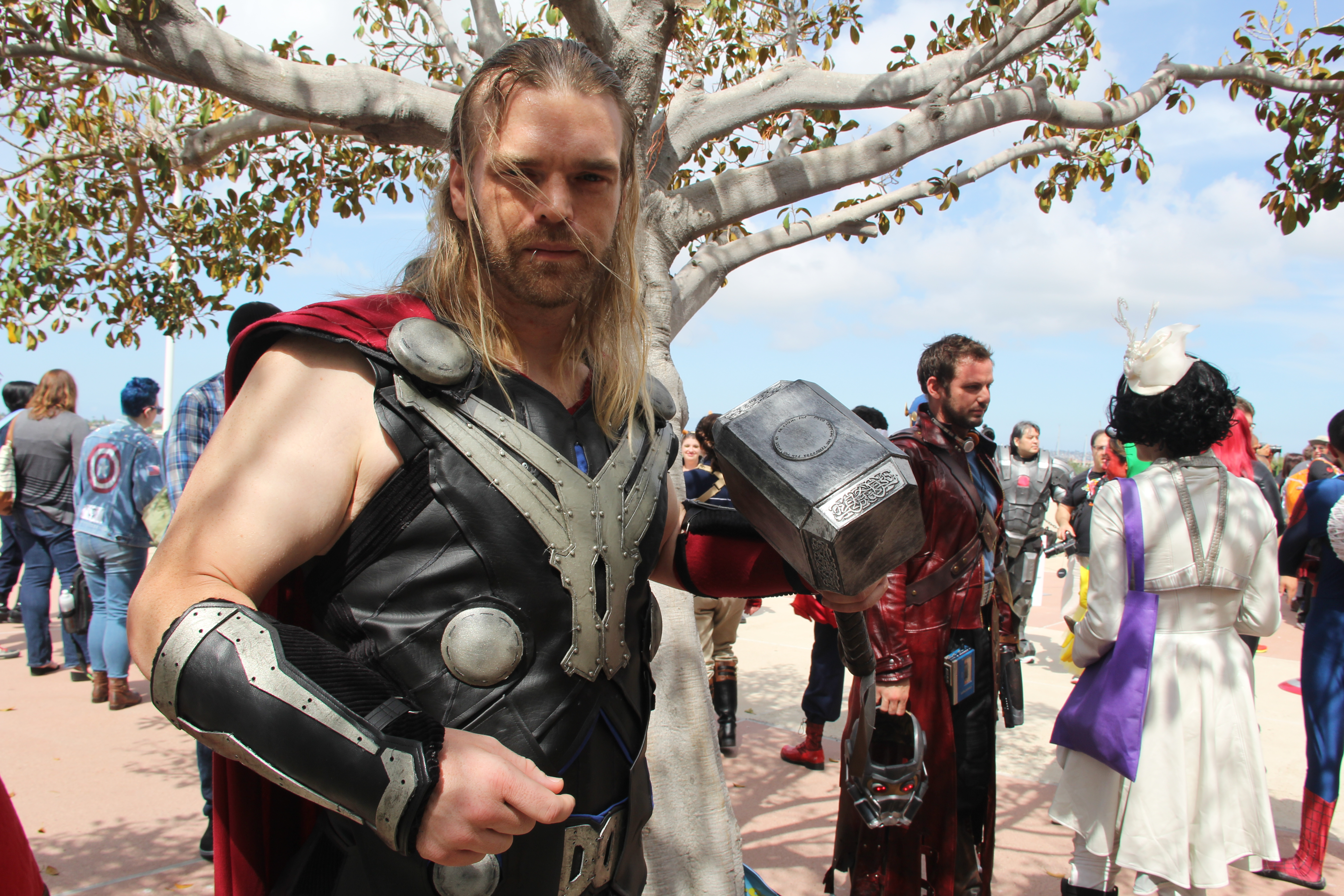
Cosplayer portraying Chris Hemsworth's Thor at the 2016 San Diego Comic-Con

While Hemsworth's portrayal of the character has received praise, Thor, as a character, was initially less well-received than other Avengers characters, and it has been stated that "before Ragnarok, Thor was described by some as an ill-defined if likable meathead of a character, used primarily for punching and occasionally fish-out-of-water jokes made at his expense", and that films featuring the character were "the studio's least fun franchise". In particular, The Dark World was criticized for adding "absolutely zero development or growth for its main character", resulting in "little enthusiasm for Thor from either audiences or Marvel". Thor: Ragnarok, however, was much better received, to the extent that it has widely been described as saving the Thor franchise. In his review of Avengers: Endgame, Joe Morgenstern of The Wall Street Journal acknowledged "Chris Hemsworth's Thor, endearing despite some ragged material and the actor's seemingly limited dramatic range".

=== Avengers: Infinity War ===
Thor in Infinity War was widely praised, for its themes signifying his losses, his journey as a god and his sacrifice for the people of earth and Asgard. Mike Reyes of Cinema blend stated "The quest itself is Thor's way of trying to build himself back up after the most devastating losses, and Hemsworth is most certainly game for that. Watching him talk things out with Rocket Raccoon was a quiet moment that pays off in the best way possible when he ultimately forges and uses Stormbreaker. After losing everything, Thor is severely desperate to get back in the saddle and be a hero again, only this time it's not out of youthful impulse. Paying close attention to his conversation with Rocket, you can see a bit more of the age and wisdom in his person, particularly due to the fact that Chris Hemsworth seems to have adopted more of the tone and mannerisms of Anthony Hopkins' Odin. We've seen the son become the father, and now he is ready to become the hero he was always meant to be". Thor's characterization, themes and symbolism were praised by fans and critics alike, with many considering it to be best iteration of Thor in the Marvel Cinematic Universe.

=== "Fat Thor" depiction ===
An overweight Thor, as depicted in Avengers: Endgame (2019), colloquially dubbed as "Fat Thor", "Lebowski Thor" or "Bro Thor". This iteration of the character received both acclaim and substantial backlash.

The depiction of Thor as a depressed and obese alcoholic in Avengers: Endgame, and the subsequent use of jokes directed at Thor by other characters due to this, led to accusations of fat shaming in various editorial commentary and fan reactions. Others indicated disapproval that Thor's emotional and physical state was played for laughs instead of being approached with more respect and understanding.

On the other hand, the depiction also received critical acclaim for adding relatability and for the tackling of mental health issues, with Hemsworth himself having advocated against the initial plan for Thor to become muscular again halfway through the film. Joe Morgenstern of The Wall Street Journal praised Hemsworth in the Avengers franchise finale "as the graceful, exuberant comic actor he was destined to be, while Thor morphs, alarmingly and charmingly—yet still heroically—into a beer-bellied apparition who could pass for Jeff Lebowski."

=== Accolades ===
Year	Film	Award	Category	Result	Ref(s)
2011	Thor	Teen Choice Awards	Choice Movie Breakout: Male	Nominated	
2011	Thor	Scream Awards	Best Superhero	Nominated	
2011	Thor	Scream Awards	Breakout Performance—Male	Nominated	
2012	Thor	People's Choice Awards	Favorite Movie Superhero	Nominated	
2012	Thor	MTV Movie Awards	Best Hero	Nominated	
2012	The Avengers	Teen Choice Awards	Choice Movie Actor: Sci-Fi/Fantasy	Nominated	
2012	The Avengers	Teen Choice Awards	Choice Summer Movie Star: Male	Won	
2013	The Avengers	People's Choice Awards	Favorite Action Movie Star	Won	
2013	The Avengers	People's Choice Awards	Favorite Movie Superhero	Nominated	
2013	The Avengers	Kids' Choice Awards	Favorite Male Buttkicker	Nominated	
2013	The Avengers	MTV Movie Awards	Best Fight (with cast)	Won	
2014	Thor: The Dark World	MTV Movie Awards	Best Shirtless Performance	Nominated	
2014	Thor: The Dark World	MTV Movie Awards	Best Hero	Nominated	
2014	Thor: The Dark World	Teen Choice Awards	Choice Movie Actor: Sci-Fi/Fantasy	Nominated	
2015	Avengers: Age of Ultron	Teen Choice Awards	Choice Movie Actor: Sci-Fi/Fantasy	Nominated	
2016	Avengers: Age of Ultron	People's Choice Awards	Favorite Movie Actor	Won	
2016	Avengers: Age of Ultron	Kids' Choice Awards	Favorite Movie Actor	Nominated	
2018	Thor: Ragnarok	Critics' Choice Awards	Best Actor in a Comedy	Nominated	
2018	Thor: Ragnarok	Kids' Choice Awards	Favorite Movie Actor	Nominated	
2018	Thor: Ragnarok	MTV Movie & TV Awards	Best Fight (with Mark Ruffalo)	Nominated	
2018	Thor: Ragnarok	Teen Choice Awards	Choice Movie Actor: Sci-Fi/Fantasy	Won	
2018	Avengers: Infinity War	People's Choice Awards	Male Movie Star of 2018	Nominated	
2018	Avengers: Infinity War	People's Choice Awards	Action Movie Star of 2018	Nominated	
2019	Avengers: Infinity War	Kids' Choice Awards	Favorite Movie Actor	Nominated	
2019	Avengers: Infinity War	Kids' Choice Awards	Favorite Superhero	Nominated	
2019	Avengers: Endgame	Teen Choice Awards	Choice Action Movie Actor	Nominated	
2019	Avengers: Endgame	People's Choice Awards	Male Movie Star of 2019	Nominated	
2020	Avengers: Endgame	Kids' Choice Awards	Favorite Movie Actor	Nominated	
2020	Avengers: Endgame	Kids' Choice Awards	Favourite Superhero	Nominated	
2022	Thor: Love and Thunder	People's Choice Awards	Male Movie Star of 2022	Won	
2022	Thor: Love and Thunder	People's Choice Awards	Action Movie Star of 2022	Nominated	
2022	Thor: Love and Thunder	AACTA Awards	Audience Choice Award for Best Actor	Nominated	
2023	Thor: Love and Thunder	Kids' Choice Awards	Favorite Movie Actor	Nominated	

== See also ==
- Characters of the Marvel Cinematic Universe
- Norse mythology in popular culture
- Thor (Marvel Comics) in other media
