= Marvel Cinematic Universe: Phase Three =

2016–2019 group of superhero films

Phase Three
- Covers for the "Marvel Studios Cinematic Universe: Phase Three" Parts One and Two Blu-ray box sets
- Based on: Characters published by Marvel Comics
- Produced by: Kevin Feige; Amy Pascal (SM); Stephen Broussard (AM&W)
- Starring: See below
- Production companies: Marvel Studios; Columbia Pictures (SM)
- Distributed by: Walt Disney Studios Motion Pictures; Sony Pictures Releasing (SM)
- Release date: 2016–2019
- Country: United States
- Language: English
- Budget: Total (11 films): $2.294–2.403 billion
- Box office: Total (11 films): $13.520 billion

Marvel Cinematic Universe Phases
- The Infinity Saga; Phase One (2008–2012); Phase Two (2013–2015); Phase Three (2016–2019)
- The Multiverse Saga; Phase Four (2021–2022); Phase Five (2023–2025); Phase Six (2025–2027)

Phase Three of the Marvel Cinematic Universe (MCU) is a group of American superhero films produced by Marvel Studios based on characters that appear in publications by Marvel Comics. The MCU is the shared universe in which all of the films are set. The phase, which began with Captain America: Civil War in May 2016, features individual superhero films that build to the crossover films Avengers: Infinity War (2018) and Avengers: Endgame (2019). It includes two Spider-Man films that were co-productions between Marvel Studios and Columbia Pictures, including Spider-Man: Far From Home which ended Phase Three in July 2019. Phases One, Two, and Three make up "The Infinity Saga" storyline.

Kevin Feige produced every film in the phase, with Amy Pascal also producing Spider-Man: Homecoming (2017) and Far From Home, and Stephen Broussard also producing Ant-Man and the Wasp (2018). Civil War, Infinity War, and Endgame directors Anthony and Joe Russo and writers Christopher Markus and Stephen McFeely collaborated with the creative teams for each film in the phase. The films star Chris Evans as Steve Rogers / Captain America in Civil War, Benedict Cumberbatch as Dr. Stephen Strange in Doctor Strange (2016), Chris Pratt as Peter Quill / Star-Lord in Guardians of the Galaxy Vol. 2 (2017), Tom Holland as Peter Parker / Spider-Man in the Spider-Man films, Chris Hemsworth as Thor in Thor: Ragnarok (2017), Chadwick Boseman as T'Challa / Black Panther in Black Panther (2018), Paul Rudd as Scott Lang / Ant-Man and Evangeline Lilly as Hope van Dyne / Wasp in Ant-Man and the Wasp, and Brie Larson as Carol Danvers / Captain Marvel in Captain Marvel (2019); all returned for one or both of the crossover films. Evans and Holland have the most appearances in the phase, each starring or making cameo appearances in five films. Walt Disney Studios Motion Pictures distributed the films except for the Spider-Man films, which were released by Sony Pictures Releasing. The phase's films grossed over US$13.5 billion at the global box office and received generally positive critical and public responses. Endgame became the highest-grossing film at the time. (Note: After becoming the highest-grossing film of all time, Avengers: Endgame was later surpassed by Avatar (2009) when that film was re-released in 2021.) The phase is seen as the franchise's best, with consistent quality and a cohesive overarching story.

Each feature film received tie-in comic books and some were marketed using the in-universe news shows WHIH Newsfront and The Daily Bugle. Marvel Studios also released the Team Thor mockumentary shorts series which expand on Thor's portrayal in Ragnarok. In 2024, a group of television series based on Marvel Comics that were produced by Marvel Television, separately from Marvel Studios, for the streaming service Netflix were retroactively added to the MCU timeline, primarily alongside Phase Three content.

== Development ==
On October 28, 2014, Marvel Studios president Kevin Feige announced the full slate of films that the studio planned to release as part of Phase Three of the Marvel Cinematic Universe (MCU): Captain America: Civil War (2016), Doctor Strange (2016), Guardians of the Galaxy Vol. 2 (2017), Thor: Ragnarok (2017), Black Panther (2018), Captain Marvel (2018), and Inhumans (2018), as well as the culminating crossover films Avengers: Infinity War – Part 1 (2018) and Avengers: Infinity War – Part 2 (2019). Feige made this announcement at the El Capitan Theatre in Hollywood, Los Angeles, in an event that drew comparisons to Apple's Worldwide Developers Conference. Feige explained that the studio had wanted to announce all of the titles at San Diego Comic-Con earlier in 2014, but "things were not set" for the slate at that point, so the one-off event was used instead once all of the films could be confirmed. Marvel Studios had never done a solo event such as this before. Feige anticipated that it would occur in early August or mid-September before the October date was settled on.

The 2014 Sony Pictures hack, which saw confidential Sony Pictures data being leaked online, revealed that Sony and Marvel were having conversations about potentially sharing the popular Marvel Comics character Spider-Man. Marvel wanted to introduce a new version of Spider-Man in Civil War and then have the character continue working with the Avengers in future films, while allowing Sony to keep creative control and use him in their own Spider-Man movies and spin-offs. There was also potential for Sony to use some of Marvel's characters. On February 9, 2015, Marvel officially announced a deal with Sony Pictures to allow Spider-Man to appear in the MCU. In June, Tom Holland was revealed to have been cast as Peter Parker / Spider-Man for Civil War and the next Sony Spider-Man film, later announced as Spider-Man: Homecoming (2017). The addition of Homecoming and the Ant-Man sequel Ant-Man and the Wasp (2018) to the Phase Three slate led to date changes for Ragnarok (later in 2017), Black Panther (2018), and Captain Marvel (2019). Inhumans was removed from the release schedule, though it was not outright canceled. In November 2016, Feige said "Inhumans will happen for sure. I don't know when. I think it's happening on television. And I think as we get into Phase Four as I've always said, it could happen as a movie." Shortly after, Marvel Television and IMAX Corporation announced the eight-episode television series Inhumans (2017), to be produced with ABC Studios and air on ABC; Marvel Studios decided that the characters were better suited to television, rather than trying to fit multiple potential Inhumans franchise films around the studio's existing film slate. The Inhumans series was not intended to be a reworking of the planned film.

In July 2016, Avengers: Infinity War – Part 1 was retitled Avengers: Infinity War, while Part 2 was left untitled until the release of its first teaser trailer in December 2018, when it was revealed to be Avengers: Endgame. After the title was revealed, Feige said withholding it for so long had backfired on the studio due to the high expectations that fans had set for the reveal. Despite this, Feige stood by the decision. He explained that the October 2014 Infinity War announcement had taken attention away from Avengers: Age of Ultron (2015) and the studio did not want to repeat that mistake by announcing Endgame's title before Infinity War was released. Sony confirmed a sequel to Homecoming, later titled Spider-Man: Far From Home, in December 2016. It was scheduled for release in July 2019, shortly after Endgame's premiere. Sony's insistence that the sequel be released in 2019 clashed with Marvel's MCU plans considering the character dies at the end of Infinity War and is not resurrected until Endgame, by which time marketing for Far From Home had begun. It was believed to be the first film in Phase Four until April 2019, when Feige said Far From Home would be the final film of Phase Three. In June, he added that the film would be the conclusion to the MCU's "The Infinity Saga" storyline.

Marvel Studios was integrated into Walt Disney Studios in 2015, with Feige reporting to Walt Disney Studios chairman Alan F. Horn instead of Marvel Entertainment CEO Isaac Perlmutter. All key film decisions moving forward were to be made by Feige and executives at Marvel Studios rather than the Marvel Entertainment "creative committee" that was involved in earlier MCU films. Following this change, a new Marvel Studios logo was introduced in July 2016 to be featured at the start of new MCU films. It features imagery from the MCU rather than Marvel's general history and the comics. The logo is accompanied by a new fanfare composed by Michael Giacchino. Civil War, Infinity War, and Endgame were directed by Anthony and Joe Russo and written by Christopher Markus and Stephen McFeely. There was a large amount of collaboration between them and the other Phase Three directors and writers to make sure "everything line[d] up right" for the MCU's culmination in Infinity War and Endgame. Peyton Reed, director of Ant-Man and Ant-Man and the Wasp, felt the relationship and collaboration between the Phase Three directors was "probably the closest thing that this generation will have to a '30s- or '40s-era studio system where you are all on the lot and you are all working on different things".

== Films ==
Phase Three films
| Film | U.S. release date | Directed by | Screenplay by | Produced by |
|---|---|---|---|---|
| Captain America: Civil War | May 6, 2016 | Anthony and Joe Russo | Christopher Markus & Stephen McFeely | Kevin Feige |
| Doctor Strange | November 4, 2016 | Scott Derrickson | Jon Spaihts and Scott Derrickson & C. Robert Cargill | Kevin Feige |
| Guardians of the Galaxy Vol. 2 | May 5, 2017 | James Gunn | James Gunn | Kevin Feige |
| Spider-Man: Homecoming | July 7, 2017 | Jon Watts | Jonathan Goldstein & John Francis Daley and Jon Watts & Christopher Ford and Chris McKenna & Erik Sommers | Kevin Feige and Amy Pascal |
| Thor: Ragnarok | November 3, 2017 | Taika Waititi | Eric Pearson and Craig Kyle & Christopher L. Yost | Kevin Feige |
| Black Panther | February 16, 2018 | Ryan Coogler | Ryan Coogler & Joe Robert Cole | Kevin Feige |
| Avengers: Infinity War | April 27, 2018 | Anthony and Joe Russo | Christopher Markus & Stephen McFeely | Kevin Feige |
| Ant-Man and the Wasp | July 6, 2018 | Peyton Reed | Chris McKenna & Erik Sommers and Paul Rudd & Andrew Barrer & Gabriel Ferrari | Kevin Feige and Stephen Broussard |
| Captain Marvel | March 8, 2019 | Anna Boden & Ryan Fleck | Anna Boden & Ryan Fleck & Geneva Robertson-Dworet | Kevin Feige |
| Avengers: Endgame | April 26, 2019 | Anthony and Joe Russo | Christopher Markus & Stephen McFeely | Kevin Feige |
| Spider-Man: Far From Home | July 2, 2019 | Jon Watts | Chris McKenna & Erik Sommers | Kevin Feige and Amy Pascal |

=== Captain America: Civil War (2016) ===
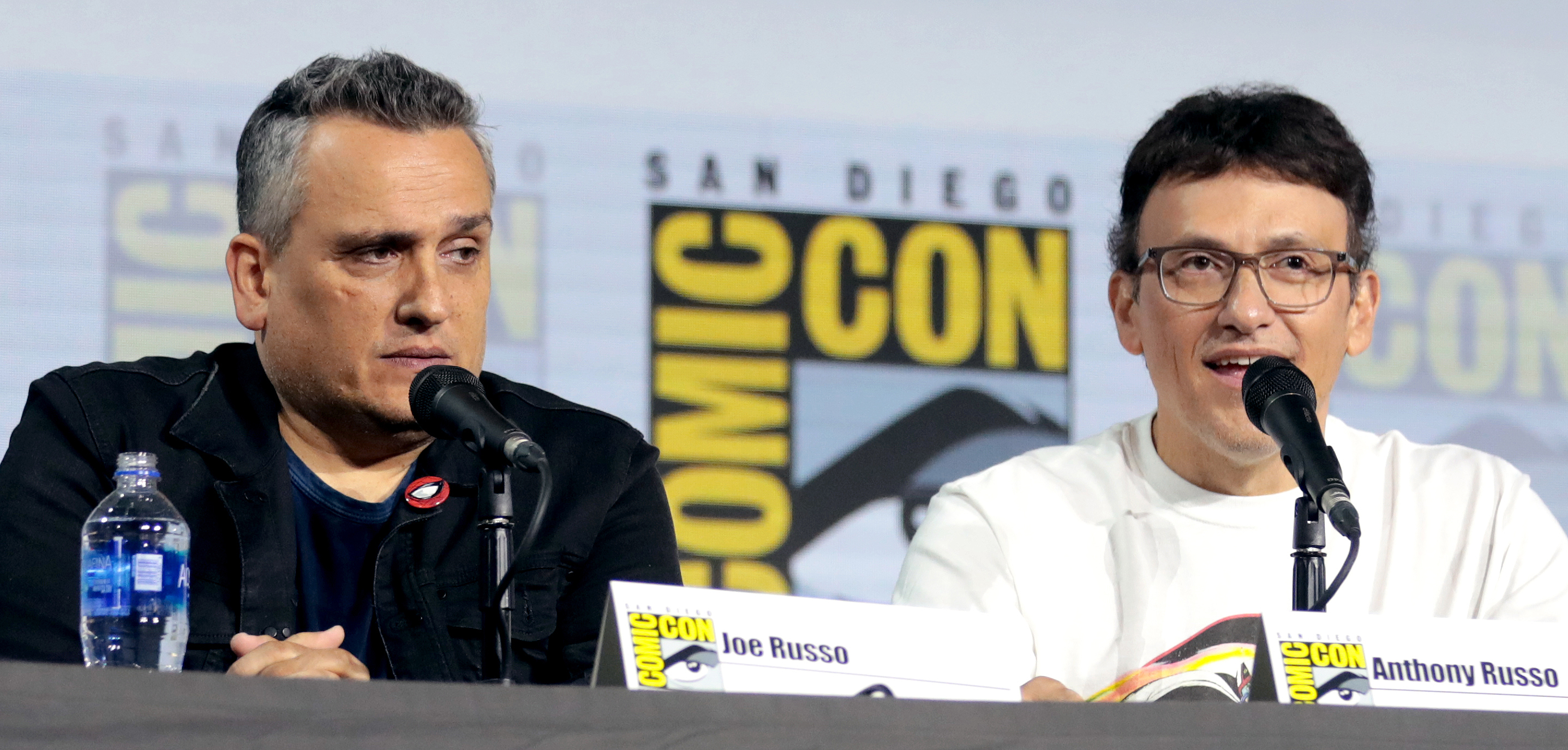
Anthony and Joe Russo, directors of Captain America: Civil War and the crossover films Avengers: Infinity War and Avengers: Endgame

The Avengers become fractured into two opposing teams, one led by Steve Rogers and another by Tony Stark, after extensive collateral damage prompts the United Nations to pass an act regulating superhuman activity with government oversight and accountability for the Avengers. They also face a new enemy, Helmut Zemo, who seeks revenge upon the Avengers.

By January 2014, Anthony and Joe Russo had signed on to return to direct a third Captain America installment, which they confirmed in March 2014, with Chris Evans returning as Captain America, Kevin Feige returning to produce, and Christopher Markus & Stephen McFeely writing the screenplay. In October 2014, the title was officially announced as Captain America: Civil War along with the reveal that Robert Downey Jr. would appear in the film as Tony Stark / Iron Man. The film is an adaptation from the "Civil War" storyline in the comics. It is also the first film of Phase Three. Filming began in April 2015 at Pinewood Atlanta Studios, and concluded in August 2015. Captain America: Civil War had its premiere in Hollywood, Los Angeles, on April 12, 2016, was released internationally beginning April 27, and was released on May 6 in the United States.

Civil War is set one year after the events of Age of Ultron. It introduces Tom Holland as Peter Parker / Spider-Man and Chadwick Boseman as T'Challa / Black Panther ahead of their own films. William Hurt reprises his role as Thaddeus Ross from The Incredible Hulk (2008), with the character now being the U.S. Secretary of State. For the mid-credits scene, in which T'Challa offers Steve Rogers and Bucky Barnes asylum in Wakanda, the filmmakers received input from Black Panther director Ryan Coogler on the look and design of Wakanda.

=== Doctor Strange (2016) ===
When a car accident ruins the career of Dr. Stephen Strange, the world's top neurosurgeon, he sets out on a journey of healing and encounters the Ancient One, who teaches Strange how to use the Mystic Arts and to defend the Earth from mystical threats.

Thomas Dean Donnelly and Joshua Oppenheimer were hired to write the screenplay for a film starring the character Doctor Strange in June 2010. Feige confirmed that Strange would be part of Phase Three in January 2013. Scott Derrickson was hired to direct in June 2014, and Benedict Cumberbatch was cast in the title role that December when Jon Spaihts was rewriting the script. C. Robert Cargill revealed he was co-writing the film a year later, alongside Derrickson. Pre-production began in June 2014, and filming beginning in November 2015 in Nepal, before moving to Longcross Studios in the United Kingdom. Filming concluded in New York City in April 2016. Doctor Strange had its premiere in Hong Kong on October 13, 2016, and was released in the UK on October 25, and in the U.S. on November 4.

Derrickson said the events of Doctor Strange take "roughly" a year, ending "up to date with the rest of the MCU", with Cargill stating that it begins in February 2016 and ends later that year. Doctor Strange introduces the Eye of Agamotto, a mystical relic that can manipulate time and is revealed to be an Infinity Stone at the end of the film, specifically the Time Stone. The film's mid-credits scene features a cameo appearance by Chris Hemsworth in his MCU role of Thor, showing the character meeting with Strange. This is footage from Thor: Ragnarok directed by Taika Waititi.

=== Guardians of the Galaxy Vol. 2 (2017) ===
The Guardians of the Galaxy travel throughout the cosmos and struggle to keep their newfound family together while facing new enemies and helping Peter Quill learn more about his true parentage.

In July 2014, Guardians of the Galaxy co-writer Nicole Perlman confirmed that James Gunn would return to write and direct the sequel. Chris Pratt returns as Peter Quill / Star-Lord, along with the other Guardians from the first film as well as additional cast members. They are joined by Pom Klementieff as Mantis, and Kurt Russell as Ego. In June 2015, the film's title was revealed as Guardians of the Galaxy Vol. 2. Filming began in February 2016 at Pinewood Atlanta Studios, and concluded in June 2016. Guardians of the Galaxy Vol. 2 premiered in Tokyo on April 10, 2017, and was released theatrically on May 5.

The film is set two-to-three months after the events of Guardians of the Galaxy, in 2014. One of the film's post-credit sequences hints at the introduction of Adam Warlock, after Gunn originally intended for Warlock to make a full appearance in Vol. 2. He said the character was considered to be "a pretty important part" of the cosmic side of the MCU; the character is introduced fully in the sequel, Guardians of the Galaxy Vol. 3 (2023), portrayed by Will Poulter. The Grandmaster, played by Jeff Goldblum, is seen dancing during Vol. 2's end credits ahead of his role in Thor: Ragnarok.

=== Spider-Man: Homecoming (2017) ===
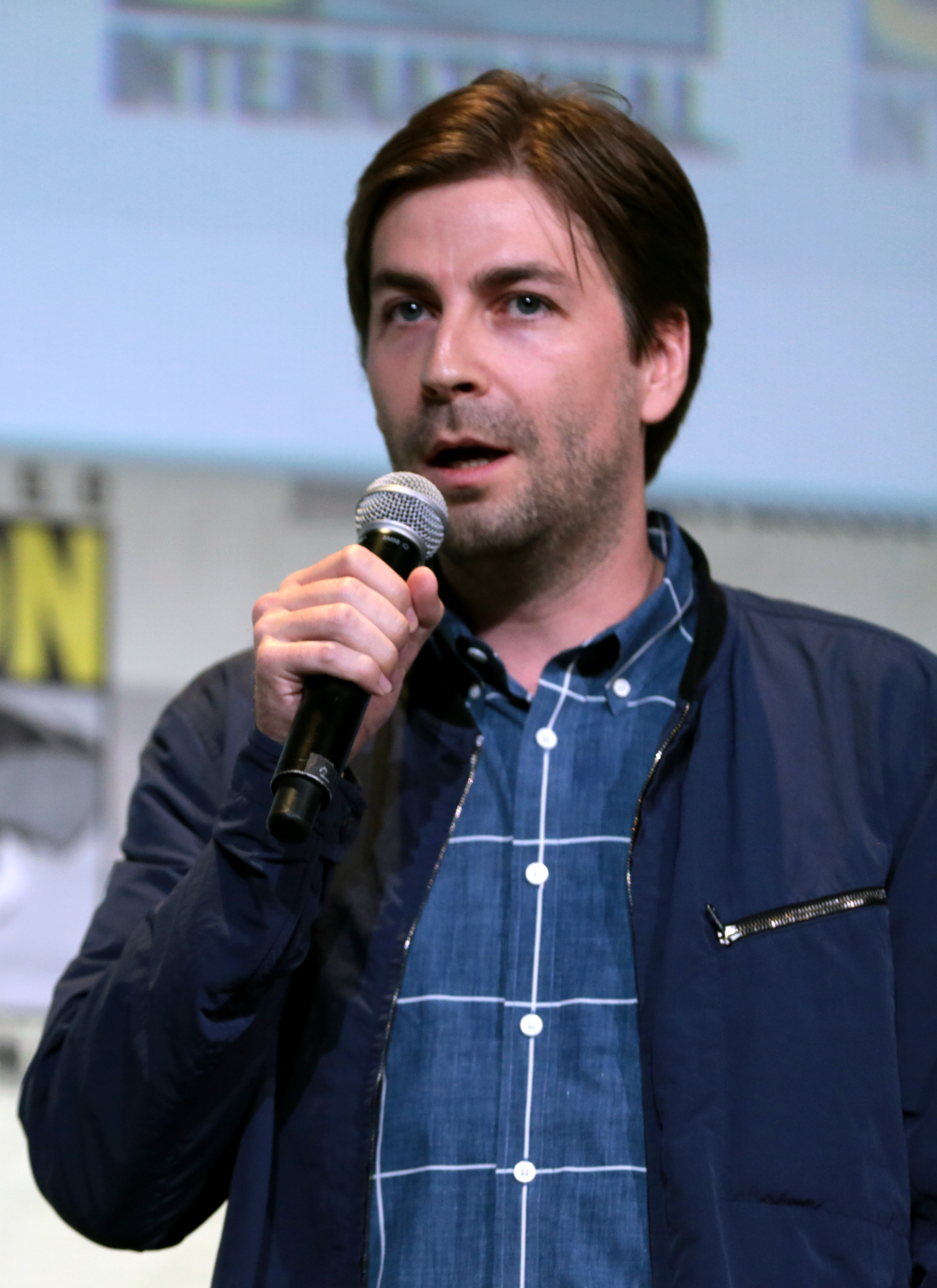
Jon Watts, director of the Spider-Man films

Peter Parker tries to balance being the hero Spider-Man with his high school life, under the guidance of Tony Stark, as he deals with the threat of the Vulture.

On February 9, 2015, Sony Pictures and Marvel announced that Sony would be releasing a Spider-Man film co-produced by Feige and Amy Pascal, with Sony Pictures continuing to own, finance, distribute, and have final creative control of the Spider-Man films. Feige said Marvel had been working to add Spider-Man to the MCU since at least the October 2014 announcement, saying, "Marvel doesn't announce anything officially until it's set in stone. So we went forward with that Plan A in October, with the Plan B being, if [the deal] were to happen with Sony, how it would all shift. We've been thinking about [the Spider-Man film] as long as we've been thinking about Phase Three." In June 2015, Tom Holland was cast in the role of Spider-Man and Jon Watts was hired to direct the film. John Francis Daley and Jonathan Goldstein were hired to write the screenplay the next month. Additional screenwriters included Watts and Christopher Ford, and Chris McKenna and Erik Sommers. In April 2016, the title was revealed to be Spider-Man: Homecoming. Production began in June 2016 at Pinewood Atlanta Studios, and concluded in October 2016. Spider-Man: Homecoming premiered on June 28, 2017, in Hollywood, Los Angeles, and was released in the UK on July 5, and the U.S. on July 7.

The film is set several months after the events of Civil War, which is four years after the events of The Avengers (2012). In April 2016, Feige confirmed that characters from previous MCU films would appear in the film, with Robert Downey Jr. confirmed to reprise his role as Tony Stark / Iron Man shortly thereafter. Jon Favreau, Gwyneth Paltrow, and Chris Evans also reprise their respective roles as Happy Hogan, Pepper Potts, and Steve Rogers / Captain America. The cleanup crew Damage Control appear in the film, after previously being referenced in Iron Man (2008) and the MCU television series Agents of S.H.I.E.L.D. (2013–2020), ahead of a then-planned television series about them. Various weapons and artifacts from previous MCU films are seen or referenced throughout Homecoming as part of Toomes and his crew repurposing technology for their weapons. At Parker's high school, one of his classes has a lesson about the Sokovia Accords from Civil War, and portraits of well-known MCU scientists Bruce Banner, Howard Stark, and Abraham Erskine are seen within the school.

=== Thor: Ragnarok (2017) ===
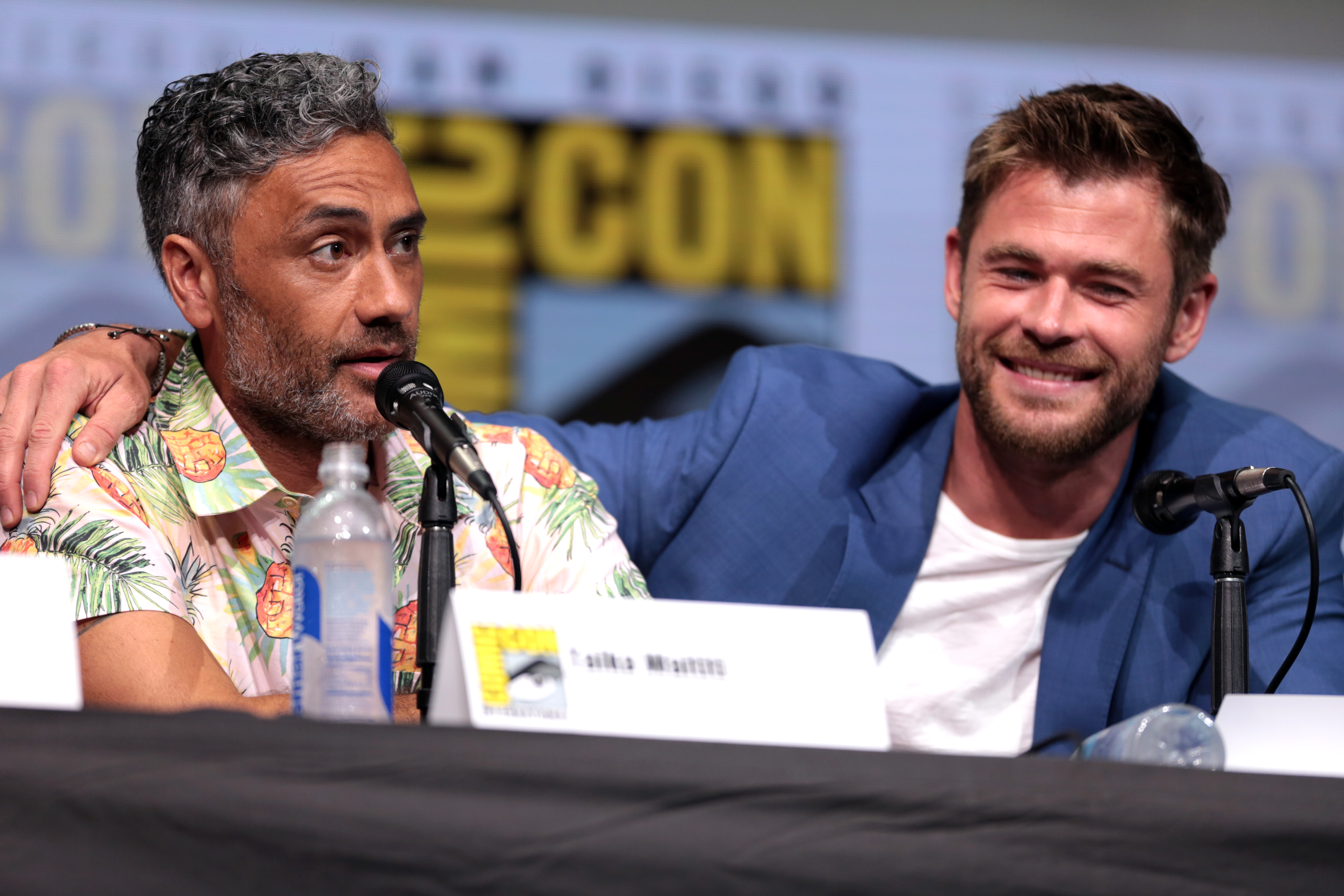
Taika Waititi directed and Chris Hemsworth starred in Thor: Ragnarok and its companion Team Thor shorts

Thor, trapped on another world without Mjolnir, must survive a gladiatorial duel against the Hulk and return to Asgard in time to stop the villainous Hela and the impending Ragnarök.

Marvel announced that a third Thor film was in development in January 2014, with Craig Kyle and Christopher L. Yost writing the screenplay. It was titled Thor: Ragnarok in October 2014. By a year later, Taika Waititi entered negotiations to direct the film. Stephany Folsom was hired to rewrite the script in December 2015. The screenplay was ultimately credited to Eric Pearson, Kyle, and Yost. Hemsworth, Tom Hiddleston, Idris Elba, and Anthony Hopkins reprise their respective roles as Thor, Loki, Heimdall, and Odin, and are joined by Cate Blanchett as Hela. Production began in July 2016 in Australia at Village Roadshow Studios, and wrapped in late October. Thor: Ragnarok premiered in Los Angeles on October 10, 2017, began its international release on October 24 in the UK, and was released on November 3 in the U.S.

The film is set four years after the events of Thor: The Dark World (2013), two years after Age of Ultron, and around the same time period as Civil War and Homecoming. Producer Brad Winderbaum stated, "Things happen on top of each other now in Phase Three. They're not as interlocked as they were in Phase One." Mark Ruffalo reprises his MCU role of Bruce Banner / Hulk, with Benedict Cumberbatch also returning as Dr. Stephen Strange from Doctor Strange. The film reveals that the Infinity Gauntlet first seen in Odin's vault in Thor (2011) is a fake, and introduces Thanos's ship Sanctuary II in a post-credits scene.

=== Black Panther (2018) ===
T'Challa returns home as sovereign of the nation of Wakanda only to find his dual role of king and protector challenged by a long-time adversary in a conflict that has global consequences.

Documentary filmmaker Mark Bailey was hired to write a script for Black Panther in January 2011. In October 2014, the film was announced and Chadwick Boseman was revealed to be portraying T'Challa / Black Panther. In January 2016, Ryan Coogler was announced as director, and the following month, Joe Robert Cole was confirmed as the film's screenwriter. In April 2016, Feige confirmed that Coogler was a co-screenwriter. Filming began in January 2017 at EUE/Screen Gems Studios in Atlanta, and concluded in April. Black Panther premiered in Los Angeles on January 29, 2018, and began its international release on February 13. It was released in the U.S. on February 16, and also had a "cross-nation release" in Africa, a first for a Disney film.

Black Panther is set one week after the events of Civil War. Florence Kasumba, Andy Serkis, Martin Freeman, and John Kani reprise their respective roles as Ayo, Ulysses Klaue, Everett K. Ross, and T'Chaka from previous MCU films. The film's post-credits scene features a cameo appearance by Sebastian Stan, reprising his role as Bucky Barnes.

=== Avengers: Infinity War (2018) ===
The Avengers join forces with the Guardians of the Galaxy to try to stop Thanos from collecting all of the Infinity Stones.

The film was announced in October 2014 as Avengers: Infinity War – Part 1. In April 2015, Marvel announced that Anthony and Joe Russo would direct the film and in May, that Christopher Markus and Stephen McFeely would write the screenplay. In July 2016, Marvel revealed the title would be shortened to simply Avengers: Infinity War. Josh Brolin reprises his role as Thanos, and is part of an ensemble cast featuring many actors who have appeared in other MCU films. Filming for Infinity War began in January 2017 in Atlanta, and lasted until that July. Additional filming also took place in Scotland. Avengers: Infinity War premiered in Los Angeles on April 23, 2018. It was released worldwide on April 27, with a few debuts beginning as early as April 25 in some countries.

The film is set two years after the events of Civil War. Marvel had been planting the seeds for Infinity War since their early films, by introducing the Infinity Stones as MacGuffins: the Tesseract / Space Stone in Captain America: The First Avenger (2011), Loki's Scepter / Mind Stone in The Avengers, the Aether / Reality Stone in The Dark World, the Orb / Power Stone in Guardians of the Galaxy, and the Eye of Agamotto / Time Stone in Doctor Strange. Additionally, Thanos is shown holding an empty Infinity Gauntlet in Age of Ultron. The Red Skull from The First Avenger appears in the film, played by Ross Marquand instead of Hugo Weaving, and is the keeper of the final Infinity Stone, the Soul Stone. The post-credits scene features Nick Fury transmitting a distress signal on a device that has the insignia of Captain Marvel.

=== Ant-Man and the Wasp (2018) ===
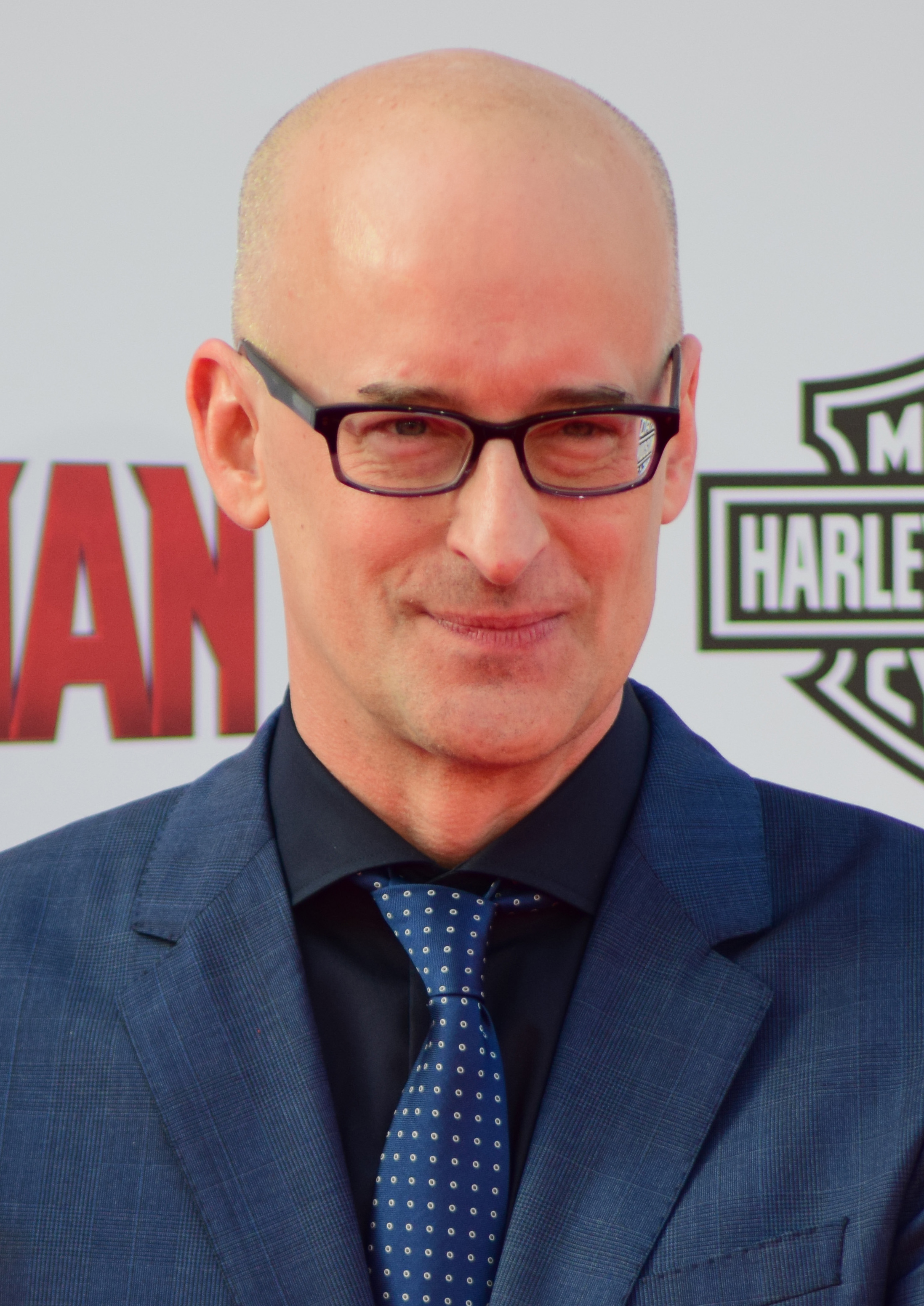
Peyton Reed, director of the Ant-Man films

While under house arrest due to his actions during Civil War, Scott Lang / Ant-Man is approached by Hope van Dyne / Wasp and Hank Pym about a new mission.

Ant-Man and the Wasp was announced in October 2015. Peyton Reed confirmed that he would return to direct in November 2015, and that Paul Rudd and Evangeline Lilly would reprise their roles as Scott Lang / Ant-Man and Hope van Dyne / Wasp, respectively. The next month, Andrew Barrer, Gabriel Ferrari, and Rudd were confirmed to be writing the screenplay, with Chris McKenna and Erik Sommers revealed to have also contributed to the script in August 2017. In February 2017, Michael Douglas confirmed he would reprise his role as Hank Pym. Michelle Pfeiffer was cast as Janet van Dyne in July, and filming began a month later in Atlanta. Additional filming took place in San Francisco, and production ended in November 2017. Stephen Broussard also served as a producer on the film. Ant-Man and the Wasp had its premiere in Hollywood, Los Angeles, on June 25, 2018, and was released in the U.S. on July 6.

The film is set two years after the events of Civil War in the lead up to Infinity War, showing what Lang is doing during the latter. In the mid-credits scene, Hope van Dyne, Hank Pym, and Janet van Dyne are disintegrated as a result of Thanos's actions at the end of Infinity War.

=== Captain Marvel (2019) ===
Carol Danvers becomes Captain Marvel, one of the galaxy's strongest heroes, after the Earth is caught in the center of an intergalactic conflict between two alien worlds.

In May 2013, The Hollywood Reporter reported that Marvel had a working script based on the character Ms. Marvel. In October 2014, Marvel announced the film would be titled Captain Marvel and feature Carol Danvers. In April 2015, Nicole Perlman and Meg LeFauve were announced as screenwriters. At the 2016 San Diego Comic-Con, Brie Larson was confirmed to play the role of Carol Danvers. In April 2017, Anna Boden and Ryan Fleck were hired to direct. That August, Geneva Robertson-Dworet was revealed to be taking over as the film's screenwriter. Boden, Fleck, and Robertson-Dworet received final screenplay credits on the film. Location filming occurred in January 2018, while principal photography began in March in Los Angeles and concluded in July. The film was released on March 8, 2019.

Captain Marvel is set in 1995. Samuel L. Jackson, Djimon Hounsou, Lee Pace, and Clark Gregg reprise their MCU roles as Nick Fury, Korath, Ronan the Accuser, and Phil Coulson, respectively. The Skrull species is introduced to the MCU. The Russo brothers filmed the mid-credits scene, which takes place shortly before the first scenes of Avengers: Endgame and features Chris Evans as Steve Rogers, Scarlett Johansson as Natasha Romanoff, Don Cheadle as James Rhodes, and Mark Ruffalo as Bruce Banner. The post-credits scene shows Goose regurgitating the Tesseract on Fury's desk after swallowing it during the film's third act.

=== Avengers: Endgame (2019) ===
After half of all life in the universe was killed due to the actions of Thanos in Infinity War, the remaining Avengers and their allies must reassemble to revert those actions in one final stand.

The film was announced in October 2014 as Avengers: Infinity War – Part 2. In April 2015, it was revealed that Anthony and Joe Russo would direct the film and in May, that Christopher Markus and Stephen McFeely would write the screenplay. In July 2016, the title was temporarily changed to Untitled Avengers, before the actual title was revealed as Avengers: Endgame in December 2018. Brolin reprises his role as Thanos, and is part of an ensemble cast featuring many actors who have appeared in other MCU films. Filming began in August 2017 in Atlanta, and ended in January 2018. The film was released on April 26, 2019.

Endgame begins three weeks after the events of Infinity War, before jumping ahead five years. It does not have a post-credits scene, but features the sound of an Iron Man suit being hammered at the end of the credits as a callback to the first MCU film Iron Man. A teaser trailer for Spider-Man: Far From Home was played after the credits in some screenings of the film a week after it was first released. Endgame was intended to mark the final appearances of Robert Downey Jr. as Tony Stark and Chris Evans as Steve Rogers, though both actors later returned to the franchise.

=== Spider-Man: Far From Home (2019) ===
Peter Parker goes on a school trip to Europe with his friends. While abroad, he is recruited by Nick Fury to team up with Quentin Beck to battle the Elementals.

In December 2016, Sony Pictures scheduled a sequel to Homecoming for release on July 5, 2019. A year later, Watts was confirmed to be returning to direct. Chris McKenna and Erik Sommers returned to write the script. Holland revealed the film's title as Spider-Man: Far From Home in late June 2018. Filming began in July 2018 in England, with filming also occurring in the Czech Republic, Venice, and New York City, and lasted until October. Spider-Man: Far From Home had its premiere in Hollywood, Los Angeles, on June 26, 2019, and was released in the U.S. on July 2.

The film is set eight months after Endgame. Samuel L. Jackson and Cobie Smulders reprise their roles as Nick Fury and Maria Hill, respectively, from previous MCU media. The mid-credits scene features J. K. Simmons reprising his role as J. Jonah Jameson, having previously portrayed a different incarnation of the character in Sam Raimi's Spider-Man film trilogy. The post-credits scene reveals that Fury and Hill in the film are actually the shapeshifting Skrulls Talos and Soren, with the real Nick Fury shown to be in space. Ben Mendelsohn and Sharon Blynn reprise their respective roles as Talos and Soren from Captain Marvel.

== Timeline ==
Marvel Cinematic Universe: Phase Three timeline Full timeline at Marvel Cinematic Universe timeline Age of Ultron included for reference
| 1995 | Captain Marvel |
| 1996–2013 | |
| 2014 | Guardians of the Galaxy Vol. 2 |
| 2015 | (Age of Ultron) |
| 2016 | Civil War |
| 2016 | Black Panther |
| 2016 | Homecoming |
| 2016–2017 | Doctor Strange |
| 2017 | Ragnarok |
| 2018 | Ant-Man and the Wasp |
| 2018 | Infinity War |
| 2019–2022 | |
| 2023 | Endgame |
| 2024 | Far From Home |

As with Phase Two, the Russo brothers wanted their Phase Three films to use real time, with Civil War set a year after Age of Ultron, and Infinity War set two years after that. Winderbaum said the Phase Three films would "happen on top of each other" while being less "interlocked" as the Phase One films, with Black Panther and Homecoming respectively beginning a week and two months after Civil War; Ragnarok beginning four years after The Dark World and two years after Age of Ultron, which is around the same time as Civil War and Homecoming; Doctor Strange taking place over a whole year and ending in late 2016, "up to date with the rest of the MCU"; Ant-Man and the Wasp also set two years after Civil War and shortly before Infinity War; and both Guardians of the Galaxy and its sequel Vol. 2 being explicitly set in 2014, which Feige believed would create a four-year gap between Vol. 2 and Infinity War, though other MCU films up to that point do not specify years onscreen. Captain Marvel is set in 1995. Endgame begins shortly after Infinity War and ends in 2023 after a five-year time jump. It confirms dates for several other films, including Doctor Strange around 2017, and Ant-Man and the Wasp in 2018 before Infinity War. Far From Home begins eight months after Endgame in 2024.

When Homecoming was being developed, Watts was shown a scroll detailing the MCU timeline. This was created by co-producer Eric Carroll when he first began working for Marvel Studios. Watts said the scroll included both where the continuity of the films lined-up and did not lineup, and when fully unfurled it extended beyond the length of a long conference room table. This scroll was used as the basis to weave the continuity of Homecoming into the previous films, such as The Avengers. The relationship between those two films was labeled in Homecoming with a title card stating that eight years pass between the end of The Avengers and the events of Civil War. This title card was widely criticized as a continuity error that broke the established MCU timeline, in which only four years should have passed. Additionally, dialogue in Civil War indicates that eight years pass between the end of Iron Man and the events of that film, despite the established continuity being closer to five or six years. Infinity War co-director Joe Russo described the Homecoming eight years time jump as "very incorrect", and the mistake was ignored in Infinity War which specified that its events were taking place only six years after The Avengers. The public response to the Homecoming mistake inspired Marvel Studios to release a new timeline for all three phases.

== Recurring cast and characters ==
List indicators

This section includes characters who have appeared in multiple Phase Three films, and have appeared in the billing block for at least one film.

- A dark grey cell indicates the character was not in the film.
- A ^{C} indicates an uncredited cameo role.
- A ^{V} indicates a voice-only role.

Characters are listed alphabetically by last name, as applicable.

Recurring cast and characters of Phase Three
| Character | 2016 | | 2017 | | | 2018 | | | 2019 | | |
| Character | Captain America: Civil War | Doctor Strange | Guardians of the Galaxy Vol. 2 | Spider-Man: Homecoming | Thor: Ragnarok | Black Panther | Avengers: Infinity War | Ant-Man and the Wasp | Captain Marvel | Avengers: Endgame | Spider-Man: Far From Home |
|---|---|---|---|---|---|---|---|---|---|---|---|
| Ancient One | | Tilda Swinton | | | | | | | | Tilda Swinton | |
| Bruce Banner Hulk | | | | | Mark Ruffalo | | Mark Ruffalo | | Mark Ruffalo^{C} | Mark Ruffalo | |
| James "Bucky" Barnes Winter Soldier / White Wolf | Sebastian Stan | | | | | Sebastian Stan^{C} | Sebastian Stan | | | Sebastian Stan | |
| Clint Barton Hawkeye / Ronin | Jeremy Renner | | | | | | | | | Jeremy Renner | |
| Carol Danvers Captain Marvel | | | | | | | | | Brie Larson | Brie Larson | |
| Drax the Destroyer | | | Dave Bautista | | | | Dave Bautista | | | Dave Bautista | |
| Nick Fury | | | | | | | Samuel L. Jackson^{C} | | Samuel L. Jackson | Samuel L. Jackson | Samuel L. Jackson |
| Gamora | | | Zoe Saldaña | | | | Zoe Saldaña | | | Zoe Saldaña | |
| Groot | | | Vin Diesel^{V} | | | | Vin Diesel^{V} | | | Vin Diesel^{V} | |
| Heimdall | | | | | Idris Elba | | Idris Elba | | | | |
| Maria Hill | | | | | | | Cobie Smulders^{C} | | | Cobie Smulders | Cobie Smulders |
| Harold "Happy" Hogan | | | | Jon Favreau | | | | | | Jon Favreau | Jon Favreau |
| Roger Harrington | | | | Martin Starr | | | | | | | Martin Starr |
| Michelle "MJ" Jones-Watson | | | | Zendaya | | | | | | | Zendaya |
| Kraglin | | | Sean Gunn | | | | | | | Sean Gunn | |
| Cassie Lang | | | | | | | | Abby Ryder Fortson | | Emma Fuhrmann | |
| Scott Lang Ant-Man | Paul Rudd | | | | | | | Paul Rudd | | Paul Rudd | |
| Ned Leeds | | | | Jacob Batalon | | | Jacob Batalon | | | Jacob Batalon | Jacob Batalon |
| Loki | | | | | Tom Hiddleston | | Tom Hiddleston | | | Tom Hiddleston | |
| Mantis | | | Pom Klementieff | | | | Pom Klementieff | | | Pom Klementieff | |
| Wanda Maximoff | Elizabeth Olsen | | | | | | Elizabeth Olsen | | | Elizabeth Olsen | |
| M'Baku | | | | | | Winston Duke | Winston Duke | | | Winston Duke | |
| Nebula | | | Karen Gillan | | | | Karen Gillan | | | Karen Gillan | |
| Okoye | | | | | | Danai Gurira | Danai Gurira | | | Danai Gurira | |
| May Parker | Marisa Tomei | | | Marisa Tomei | | | | | | Marisa Tomei | Marisa Tomei |
| Peter Parker Spider-Man | Tom Holland | | | Tom Holland | | | Tom Holland | | | Tom Holland | Tom Holland |
| Virginia "Pepper" Potts | | | | Gwyneth Paltrow | | | Gwyneth Paltrow | | | Gwyneth Paltrow | |
| Hank Pym Ant-Man | | | | | | | | Michael Douglas | | Michael Douglas | |
| Peter Quill Star-Lord | | | Chris Pratt | | | | Chris Pratt | | | Chris Pratt | |
| Ramonda | | | | | | Angela Bassett | | | | Angela Bassett | |
| James "Rhodey" Rhodes War Machine / Iron Patriot | Don Cheadle | | | | | | Don Cheadle | | Don Cheadle^{C} | Don Cheadle | |
| Rocket | | | Bradley Cooper^{V} | | | | Bradley Cooper^{V} | | | Bradley Cooper^{V} | |
| Steve Rogers Captain America | Chris Evans | | | Chris Evans | | | Chris Evans | | Chris Evans^{C} | Chris Evans | |
| Natasha Romanoff Black Widow | Scarlett Johansson | | | | | | Scarlett Johansson | | Scarlett Johansson^{C} | Scarlett Johansson | |
| Everett K. Ross | Martin Freeman | | | | | Martin Freeman | | | | | |
| Thaddeus "Thunderbolt" Ross | William Hurt | | | | | | William Hurt | | | William Hurt | |
| Brock Rumlow Crossbones | Frank Grillo | | | | | | | | | Frank Grillo | |
| Shuri | | | | | | Letitia Wright | Letitia Wright | | | Letitia Wright | |
| Tony Stark Iron Man | Robert Downey Jr. | | | Robert Downey Jr. | | | Robert Downey Jr. | | | Robert Downey Jr. | |
| Talos | | | | | | | | | Ben Mendelsohn | | Ben Mendelsohn^{C} |
| Thanos | | | | | | | Josh Brolin | | | Josh Brolin | |
| Stephen Strange | | Benedict Cumberbatch | | | Benedict Cumberbatch | | Benedict Cumberbatch | | | Benedict Cumberbatch | |
| T'Challa Black Panther | Chadwick Boseman | | | | | Chadwick Boseman | Chadwick Boseman | | | Chadwick Boseman | |
| Thor | | Chris Hemsworth^{C} | | | Chris Hemsworth | | Chris Hemsworth | | | Chris Hemsworth | |
| Hope van Dyne Wasp | | | | | | | | Evangeline Lilly | | Evangeline Lilly | |
| Janet van Dyne Wasp | | | | | | | | Michelle Pfeiffer | | Michelle Pfeiffer | |
| Valkyrie | | | | | Tessa Thompson | | | | | Tessa Thompson | |
| Vision | Paul Bettany | | | | | | Paul Bettany | | | | |
| Sam Wilson Falcon | Anthony Mackie | | | | | | Anthony Mackie | | | Anthony Mackie | |
| Wong | | Benedict Wong | | | | | Benedict Wong | | | Benedict Wong | |

== Music ==
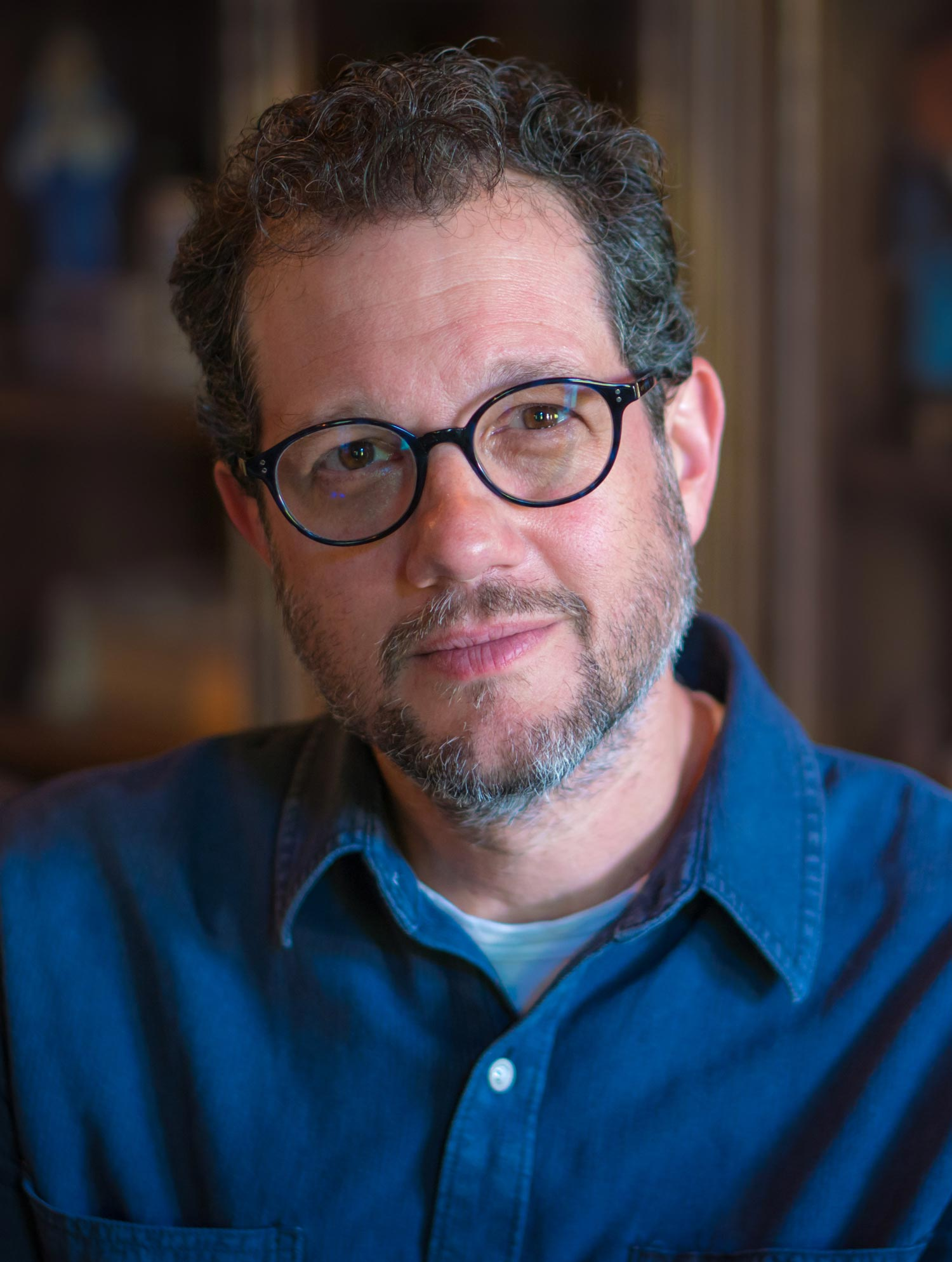
Michael Giacchino composed the score for three Phase Three films and also provided the fanfare for the new Marvel Studios logo

Score albums for Phase Three films
| Title | U.S. release date | Length | Composer | Label(s) | Ref. |
|---|---|---|---|---|---|
| Captain America: Civil War (Original Motion Picture Soundtrack) | May 6, 2016 | 69:09 | Henry Jackman | Hollywood Records; Marvel Music | |
| Doctor Strange (Original Motion Picture Soundtrack) | October 21, 2016 | 66:28 | Michael Giacchino | Hollywood Records; Marvel Music | |
| Guardians of the Galaxy Vol. 2 (Original Score) | April 21, 2017 | 43:34 | Tyler Bates | Hollywood Records; Marvel Music | |
| Spider-Man: Homecoming (Original Motion Picture Soundtrack) | July 7, 2017 | 66:40 | Michael Giacchino | Sony Masterworks | |
| Thor: Ragnarok (Original Motion Picture Soundtrack) | October 20, 2017 | 72:52 | Mark Mothersbaugh | Hollywood Records; Marvel Music | |
| Black Panther (Original Score) | February 16, 2018 | 95:07 | Ludwig Göransson | Hollywood Records; Marvel Music | |
| Avengers: Infinity War (Original Motion Picture Soundtrack) | April 27, 2018 | 71:36 | Alan Silvestri | Hollywood Records; Marvel Music | |
| Ant-Man and the Wasp (Original Motion Picture Soundtrack) | July 6, 2018 | 56:13 | Christophe Beck | Hollywood Records; Marvel Music | |
| Captain Marvel (Original Motion Picture Soundtrack) | March 8, 2019 | 67:28 | Pinar Toprak | Hollywood Records; Marvel Music | |
| Avengers: Endgame (Original Motion Picture Soundtrack) | April 26, 2019 | 116:00 | Alan Silvestri | Hollywood Records; Marvel Music | |
| Spider-Man: Far From Home (Original Motion Picture Soundtrack) | July 2, 2019 | 79:43 | Michael Giacchino | Sony Classical Records | |

Compilation albums for Phase Three films
| Title | U.S. release date | Length | Labels | Ref. |
|---|---|---|---|---|
| Guardians of the Galaxy Vol. 2: Awesome Mix Vol. 2 (Original Motion Picture Soundtrack) | April 21, 2017 | 51:59 | Hollywood Records; Marvel Music | |
| Black Panther: The Album | February 9, 2018 | 49:12 | Interscope Records; Top Dawg Entertainment; Aftermath Entertainment | |

Awesome Mix Vol. 2 features the original end credits song "Guardians Inferno". Black Panther: The Album, curated by Kendrick Lamar, includes the singles "All the Stars", "King's Dead", and "Pray for Me".

== Home media ==
Home media releases of Phase Three
| Film | Digital release | DVD/Blu-ray release | Ref. |
|---|---|---|---|
| Captain America: Civil War | September 2, 2016 | September 13, 2016 | |
| Doctor Strange | February 14, 2017 | February 28, 2017 | |
| Guardians of the Galaxy Vol. 2 | August 8, 2017 | August 22, 2017 | |
| Spider-Man: Homecoming | September 26, 2017 | October 17, 2017 | |
| Thor: Ragnarok | February 20, 2018 | March 6, 2018 | |
| Black Panther | May 8, 2018 | May 15, 2018 | |
| Avengers: Infinity War | July 31, 2018 | August 14, 2018 | |
| Ant-Man and the Wasp | October 2, 2018 | October 16, 2018 | |
| Captain Marvel | May 28, 2019 | June 11, 2019 | |
| Avengers: Endgame | July 30, 2019 | August 13, 2019 | |
| Spider-Man: Far From Home | September 17, 2019 | October 1, 2019 | |

== Reception ==
=== Box office performance ===
Phase Three is the highest-grossing phase, more than doubling Phase Two's $5.3 billion gross. Six of the eleven films made over $1 billion at the worldwide box office, including Infinity War and Endgame which each made more than $2 billion. Infinity War became the fourth-highest-grossing film and Endgame the highest-grossing film at the time, unadjusted for inflation. Endgame dethroned Avatar (2009) on July 21, 2019. 2019 was the first year that three MCU films made at least $1 billion each: Captain Marvel, Endgame, and Spider-Man: Far From Home. Far From Home was the first Spider-Man film to make $1 billion at the box office.

Box office performance of Phase Three
| Film | U.S. release date | Box office gross | | | All-time ranking | | Budget | Ref. |
| Film | U.S. release date | U.S. and Canada | Other territories | Worldwide | U.S. and Canada | Worldwide | Budget | Ref. |
|---|---|---|---|---|---|---|---|---|
| Captain America: Civil War | May 6, 2016 | $408,084,349 | $746,962,067 | $1,155,046,416 | 42 | 29 | $250 million | |
| Doctor Strange | November 4, 2016 | $232,641,920 | $445,154,156 | $677,796,076 | 174 | 155 | $165 million | |
| Guardians of the Galaxy Vol. 2 | May 5, 2017 | $389,813,101 | $473,942,950 | $863,756,051 | 50 | 88 | $200 million | |
| Spider-Man: Homecoming | July 7, 2017 | $334,201,140 | $545,965,784 | $880,166,924 | 80 | 78 | $175 million | |
| Thor: Ragnarok | November 3, 2017 | $315,058,289 | $540,243,517 | $855,301,806 | 97 | 92 | $180 million | |
| Black Panther | February 16, 2018 | $700,426,566 | $674,533,163 | $1,374,959,729 | 6 | 17 | $200 million | |
| Avengers: Infinity War | April 27, 2018 | $678,815,482 | $1,373,599,557 | $2,052,415,039 | 8 | 6 | $325–400 million | |
| Ant-Man and the Wasp | July 6, 2018 | $216,648,740 | $406,025,399 | $622,674,139 | 204 | 179 | $162 million | |
| Captain Marvel | March 8, 2019 | $426,829,839 | $704,586,607 | $1,131,416,446 | 33 | 33 | $150–175 million | |
| Avengers: Endgame (Note: The following row represents the 2019 box office gross for Endgame, including its June 2019 re-release. In September 2026, Endgame was again re-released in theaters, known as Avengers Endgame: Encore, which added an additional $142,738,664 to its box office, bringing its total gross to $2,942,177,764.) | April 26, 2019 | $858,373,000 | $1,941,066,100 | $2,799,439,100 | 2 | 2 | $356–400 million | |
| Spider-Man: Far From Home | July 2, 2019 | $391,283,774 | $746,838,016 | $1,138,121,790 | 49 | 32 | $160 million | |
| Total | | $4,951,424,511 | $8,568,441,565 | $13,519,866,076 | – | – | $2.294–2.403 billion | |

=== Critical and public response ===
Critical and public response of Phase Three
| Film | Critical | | Public | |
| Film | Rotten Tomatoes | Metacritic | CinemaScore | PostTrak |
|---|---|---|---|---|
| Captain America: Civil War | 90% (430 reviews) | 75 (52 reviews) | A | 88% |
| Doctor Strange | 89% (385 reviews) | 72 (49 reviews) | A | 91% |
| Guardians of the Galaxy Vol. 2 | 85% (422 reviews) | 67 (47 reviews) | A | 93% |
| Spider-Man: Homecoming | 92% (396 reviews) | 73 (51 reviews) | A | 89% |
| Thor: Ragnarok | 93% (437 reviews) | 74 (51 reviews) | A | 90% |
| Black Panther | 96% (526 reviews) | 88 (55 reviews) | A+ | 95% |
| Avengers: Infinity War | 85% (486 reviews) | 68 (54 reviews) | A | 87% |
| Ant-Man and the Wasp | 87% (445 reviews) | 70 (56 reviews) | A− | —N/a |
| Captain Marvel | 79% (545 reviews) | 64 (56 reviews) | A | —N/a |
| Avengers: Endgame | 94% (551 reviews) | 78 (57 reviews) | A+ | —N/a |
| Spider-Man: Far From Home | 91% (454 reviews) | 69 (55 reviews) | A | —N/a |

Conner Schwerdtfeger of CinemaBlend praised Phase Three as the best of the MCU so far, citing the diversification of character personality traits, genres, and filmmaking styles in addition to the more diverse character line-up following the introductions of Black Panther, Captain Marvel, and more. He believed the more diverse approach to storytelling had allowed the MCU to avoid so-called "superhero fatigue" and concluded, "if Marvel can continue defining the differences in the styles and genres of each hero's particular sub-franchise, then there's arguably no reason to assume that the MCU cannot continue for years to come and continue staying as fresh as ever" following Phase Three. Douglas Laman at Collider also noted the progress made with representation among lead characters, and was impressed by the number of characters, storylines, and aesthetics that the phase was able to balance. He ranked Black Panther as the best film of the phase. Discussing a survey of the weakest films in the phase, /Film's Ryan Scott said Phase Three was a "true game-changer" for the franchise and its strongest era, leaving big shoes for future phases to fill. Ant-Man and the Wasp, Doctor Strange, and Captain Marvel topped the survey, which Scott felt was proof that Marvel "hit a hot streak" with the phase since those films were all successful and well-liked by critics and audiences. Civil War, Ragnarok, Infinity War, and Endgame received no votes and Scott said they were "some of the greatest comic book movies ever made".

In an opinion piece for Entertainment Weekly, Darren Franich was more critical and found the amount of success the franchise achieved in a short period of time to be draining. He noted that Civil War and Infinity War continued a trend for the franchise of feigning big changes that would be reverted in later films: the Avengers' break-up and Thanos's killing of half of all life, respectively. However, Franich highlighted three films that he called his "MCU Holy Trinity" which each explored similar stories and themes of family lies and showed their heroes deciding to "burn it down and start over": Guardians of the Galaxy Vol. 2, Ragnarok, and Black Panther. He said they each "looked back in anger, at the MCU's history and beyond, with self-awareness and self-critique". After the first two phases received criticisms for many of their villains being weak and uninteresting, Rich Knight at CinemaBlend believed this changed with Phase Three and attributed it to them having stronger motivations. He ranked Thanos and Killmonger as the two best villains of the phase, saying they both had motivations that the audience could understand and even agree with, and in third place he ranked the Vulture. Knight felt the reveal in Homecoming that the Vulture is the father of Spider-Man's homecoming date was the best twist of the entire MCU. Writing for Mashable, Alexis Nedd agreed that the phase had improved on the MCU's "villain problem". After finding only Loki and Bucky—who both become antiheroes—to be interesting villains in the first two phases, Nedd found most of the Phase Three villains to be more interesting and attributed this to them having closer emotional connections to the heroes just like Loki and Bucky. He said Killmonger was the best villain of the phase.

Several commentators have used ranked lists when revisiting the MCU phases. After Phase Four was released, Jeff Ames of ComingSoon.net and Knight both listed Phase Three as the best, as did The Mary Sue's Rachel Ulatowski after Phase Five was released. Knight said there was no contest for what the best MCU phase is considering all the Phase Three films ranged from good to outstanding, and Infinity War and Endgame paid off storylines that had been built up since The Avengers. Ulatowski agreed that all eleven films were "well above mediocre" and highlighted Civil War, Doctor Strange, Ragnarok, Black Panther, and Endgame as some of the best films in the MCU. She praised the phase for ensuring that every film connected to the Infinity Saga storyline, and said all the films had "performances, directing, visuals, and storylines that appealed to viewers". Ames felt the phase had some "speedbumps", pointing to Captain Marvel and Doctor Strange, but also outstanding films like Civil War, Homecoming, Ragnarok, Black Panther, Infinity War, and Endgame. He said Phase Three "catapulted the franchise into something akin to legendary status" and would be looked back on as the peak of the MCU as well as "one of the more astonishing periods of sustained success in cinematic history".

=== Accolades ===
The films of Phase Three were nominated for eleven Academy Awards (winning three), six BAFTA Awards (winning one), ten Grammy Awards (winning two), three Golden Globe Awards, sixty-five Saturn Awards (winning nineteen), five Hugo Awards, nineteen MTV Movie & TV Awards (winning eight), and twenty-two Visual Effects Society Awards (winning six), among others.

== Tie-in media ==
=== Digital series ===
==== WHIH Newsfront ====
WHIH Newsfront is an in-universe current affairs show that serves as a viral marketing campaign for some of the MCU films, created in partnership with Google for YouTube. The campaign is an extension of the fictional news network WHIH World News, which is seen reporting on major events in the MCU. The videos released during April and May 2016 as a WHIH Newsfront Special Report focus on the Avengers and the political issues surrounding them as part of a viral marketing campaign for Captain America: Civil War. William Sadler reprises his role as President of the United States Matthew Ellis from Iron Man 3 (2013).

==== The Daily Bugle ====
The Daily Bugle is an in-universe current affairs show serving as viral marketing campaign for Spider-Man: Far From Home, with six videos released on YouTube during October and November 2019. It is based on the fictional sensationalist news outlet of the same name that appears in the MCU—itself based on the fictional newspaper agency of the same name appearing in several Marvel Comics publications. J. K. Simmons reprises his role as J. Jonah Jameson from the mid-credits scene of Far From Home.

=== Short films ===
Short film series in the Marvel Cinematic Universe
| Film | U.S. release date | | Director & Screenwriter | Producer | Home media release |
| Film | Digital | Physical | Director & Screenwriter | Producer | Home media release |
|---|---|---|---|---|---|
| Team Thor | August 28, 2016 | September 13, 2016 | Taika Waititi | Kevin Feige | Captain America: Civil War |
| Team Thor: Part 2 | February 14, 2017 | February 28, 2017 | Taika Waititi | Kevin Feige | Doctor Strange |
| Team Darryl | February 20, 2018 | March 6, 2018 | Taika Waititi | Kevin Feige | Thor: Ragnarok |

Team Thor is a series of direct-to-video mockumentary short films that were released from 2016 to 2018, consisting of Team Thor, Team Thor: Part 2, and Team Darryl, all written and directed by Taika Waititi. The three short films are included as special features in the MCU films' Blu-ray and digital distribution releases. The first two films follow Thor as he moves in with a new roommate, Darryl Jacobson, during the events of Captain America: Civil War, while Team Darryl sees Darryl move to Los Angeles and move in with the |Grandmaster. The shorts were designed to introduce MCU fans to the irreverent tone of Waititi's Thor: Ragnarok. The three shorts were made available on Disney+ in January 2022, at which point Marvel classified them as Marvel One-Shots.

=== Comic books ===
Tie-in comics of Phase Three
| Title | No. of issues | Publication date | | Writer(s) | Artist(s) |
| Title | No. of issues | First published | Last published | Writer(s) | Artist(s) |
|---|---|---|---|---|---|
| Marvel's Jessica Jones | 1 | October 7, 2015 | | Brian Michael Bendis | Michael Gaydos |
| Marvel's Captain America: Civil War Prelude | 4 | December 16, 2015 | January 27, 2016 | Will Corona Pilgrim (Note: References for Will Corona Pilgrim writing various MCU tie-in comics:) | Szymon Kudranski and Lee Ferguson |
| Marvel's Captain America: Civil War Prelude Infinite Comic | 1 | February 10, 2016 | | Will Corona Pilgrim | Lee Ferguson, Goran Sudžuka, and Guillermo Mogorron |
| Marvel's Doctor Strange Prelude | 2 | July 6, 2016 | August 24, 2016 | Will Corona Pilgrim | Jorge Fornés |
| Marvel's Doctor Strange Prelude Infinite Comic – The Zealot | 1 | September 7, 2016 | | Will Corona Pilgrim | Jorge Fornés |
| Marvel's Guardians of the Galaxy Vol. 2 Prelude | 2 | January 4, 2017 | February 1, 2017 | Will Corona Pilgrim | Christopher Allen |
| Spider-Man: Homecoming Prelude | 2 | March 1, 2017 | April 5, 2017 | Will Corona Pilgrim | Todd Nauck |
| Marvel's Thor: Ragnarok Prelude | 4 | July 5, 2017 | August 16, 2017 | Will Corona Pilgrim | J.L. Giles |
| Marvel's Black Panther Prelude | 2 | October 18, 2017 | November 15, 2017 | Will Corona Pilgrim | Annapaola Martello |
| Marvel's Avengers: Infinity War Prelude | 2 | December 18, 2017 January 24, 2018 | February 5, 2018 February 28, 2018 | Will Corona Pilgrim | Tigh Walker and Jorge Fornés |
| Marvel's Ant-Man and the Wasp Prelude | 2 | March 7, 2018 | April 4, 2018 | Will Corona Pilgrim | Chris Allen |
| Marvel's Captain Marvel Prelude | 1 | November 14, 2018 | | Will Corona Pilgrim | Andrea Di Vito |
| Marvel's Avengers: Endgame Prelude | 3 | December 5, 2018 | February 20, 2019 | Will Corona Pilgrim | Paco Diaz |
| Spider-Man: Far From Home Prelude | 2 | March 27, 2019 | April 24, 2019 | Will Corona Pilgrim | Luca Maresca |

== Related ==
=== Netflix television series (2015–2019) ===
Netflix television series from Marvel Television
| Series | Season | Episodes | Originally released | Showrunner(s) |
|---|---|---|---|---|
| Daredevil | 1 | 13 | April 10, 2015 | Steven S. DeKnight |
| Daredevil | 2 | 13 | March 18, 2016 | Douglas Petrie and Marco Ramirez |
| Daredevil | 3 | 13 | October 19, 2018 | Erik Oleson |
| Jessica Jones | 1 | 13 | November 20, 2015 | Melissa Rosenberg |
| Jessica Jones | 2 | 13 | March 8, 2018 | Melissa Rosenberg |
| Jessica Jones | 3 | 13 | June 14, 2019 | Melissa Rosenberg and Scott Reynolds |
| Luke Cage | 1 | 13 | September 30, 2016 | Cheo Hodari Coker |
| Luke Cage | 2 | 13 | June 22, 2018 | Cheo Hodari Coker |
| Iron Fist | 1 | 13 | March 17, 2017 | Scott Buck |
| Iron Fist | 2 | 10 | September 7, 2018 | M. Raven Metzner |
| The Defenders | 1 | 8 | August 18, 2017 | Marco Ramirez |
| The Punisher | 1 | 13 | November 17, 2017 | Steve Lightfoot |
| The Punisher | 2 | 13 | January 18, 2019 | Steve Lightfoot |

By October 2013, Marvel Television was preparing four drama series and a miniseries to present to video on demand services and cable providers, with Netflix, Amazon, and WGN America expressing interest. Disney announced the next month that it would provide Netflix with live-action series based on Daredevil, Jessica Jones, Iron Fist, and Luke Cage, leading to a crossover miniseries based on the Defenders. In April 2016, Marvel and Netflix ordered The Punisher as a spin-off from Daredevil. Netflix had canceled all of the series by the end of February 2019. All series were no longer available on Netflix starting March 1, 2022, due to Netflix's license for the series ending and Disney regaining the rights. They all began streaming on Disney+ from March 16, 2022.

With the release of Marvel Studios' Disney+ miniseries Echo in January 2024, all of the Netflix series were retroactively added to the MCU Disney+ timeline, and were placed primarily alongside the Phase Two and Phase Three content of the MCU on the timeline. Marvel Studios' head of streaming Brad Winderbaum acknowledged that Marvel Studios had previously been "a little bit cagey" about what was part of their Sacred Timeline, noting how there had been the corporate divide between what Marvel Studios created and what Marvel Television created. Marvel Studios began looking at the Netflix series as a more integral part of the MCU by September 2023, after the Daredevil revival series Daredevil: Born Again (2025–present) underwent a creative overhaul to be more aligned with the Netflix series.

=== Avengers Endgame: Encore (2026) ===
On September 25, 2026, Endgame was re-released in theaters as Avengers Endgame: Encore in anticipation of its sequel film Avengers: Doomsday (2026), featuring five-to-six minutes of additional footage. The new footage acts as a narrative bridge between the two films, enhancing the story of Doomsday and showing a natural progression from Endgame.
