= Marvel Cinematic Universe: Phase Two =

2013–2015 group of superhero films

Phase Two
- Packaging for the "Marvel Cinematic Universe: Phase Two Collection" Blu-ray box set
- Based on: Characters published by Marvel Comics
- Produced by: Kevin Feige
- Starring: See below
- Production company: Marvel Studios
- Distributed by: Walt Disney Studios; Motion Pictures
- Release date: 2013–2015
- Country: United States
- Language: English
- Budget: Total (6 films): $1.07–1.291 billion
- Box office: Total (6 films): $5.272 billion

Marvel Cinematic Universe Phases
- The Infinity Saga; Phase One (2008–2012); Phase Two (2013–2015); Phase Three (2016–2019)
- The Multiverse Saga; Phase Four (2021–2022); Phase Five (2023–2025); Phase Six (2025–2027)

Phase Two of the Marvel Cinematic Universe (MCU) is a group of American superhero films produced by Marvel Studios based on characters that appear in publications by Marvel Comics. The MCU is the shared universe in which all of the films are set. The phase, which began with Iron Man 3 in May 2013, features individual superhero films that build to a crossover film, Avengers: Age of Ultron (2015). Phase Two ended with Ant-Man in July 2015. Phases One, Two, and Three make up "The Infinity Saga" storyline.

Kevin Feige produced every film in the phase, while Age of Ultron writer and director Joss Whedon consulted on all the films. The films star Robert Downey Jr. as Tony Stark / Iron Man in Iron Man 3, Chris Hemsworth as Thor in Thor: The Dark World (2013), Chris Evans as Steve Rogers / Captain America in Captain America: The Winter Soldier (2014), Chris Pratt as Peter Quill / Star-Lord in Guardians of the Galaxy (2014), and Paul Rudd as Scott Lang / Ant-Man in Ant-Man. Downey, Hemsworth, and Evans returned to star in Age of Ultron. Evans has the most appearances in the phase, starring or making cameo appearances in four films. Walt Disney Studios Motion Pictures distributed the films, which grossed over US$5.2 billion at the global box office and received generally positive critical and public responses, with particular praise going to The Winter Soldier.

In addition to the feature films, the phase also includes two short films that Marvel Studios created for their Marvel One-Shots program—Agent Carter and All Hail the King—to expand the MCU. Each feature film also received tie-in comic books and some received tie-in video games. Ant-Man was marketed with the in-universe news show WHIH Newsfront.

== Development ==
Following the release of the Marvel Cinematic Universe (MCU) film Iron Man 2 (2010), the timing and distribution of a possible third Iron Man film were brought into question due to a conflict between Paramount Pictures—the distributor of previous Marvel Studios films, including the first two Iron Man films—and Marvel Entertainment's new corporate parent, the Walt Disney Company. On October 18, 2010, Walt Disney Studios agreed to pay Paramount at least $115 million for the worldwide distribution rights to Iron Man 3 (2013). A year later, Marvel Studios president Kevin Feige said the studio was beginning to look at the films of the second "phase" of the MCU, which would start with Iron Man 3 and culminate in a sequel to the crossover film The Avengers (2012). Feige announced the full slate of Phase Two films at San Diego Comic-Con in July 2012: Iron Man 3, Thor: The Dark World (2013), Captain America: The Winter Soldier (2014), Guardians of the Galaxy (2014), and Avengers: Age of Ultron (2015). After stating in January 2013 that Ant-Man (2015) would be the first film of Phase Three, Feige later said this had changed and Ant-Man would actually be the final film of Phase Two. This was partially due to the impact that the events of Age of Ultron have on Ant-Man's characters and story.

In August 2012, Marvel signed The Avengers director Joss Whedon to an exclusive contract through June 2015 for film and television. With the deal, Whedon would write and direct Age of Ultron, "contribute creatively" on the rest of Phase Two, and develop the first television series set in the MCU. In March 2013, Whedon explained his consulting responsibilities, saying he would "read the scripts and watch cuts and talk to the directors and writers and give my opinion" for each film in the phase, while also writing material if needed. Once the story for Age of Ultron was approved, Whedon and Marvel Studios were able to examine the other films of the phase to "really lay it out" so things could be adjusted between the films. Despite this, Whedon did not want to be beholden to the other films of Phase Two because he wanted people to be able to watch Age of Ultron who had not seen any MCU films since The Avengers. He said his experiences working in television and script doctoring were "great training ground[s] for dealing with this... because you're given a bunch of pieces and told to make them fit—even if they don't".

A new Marvel Studios logo was created by design studio Imaginary Forces for The Dark World, featuring a fanfare composed by The Dark World composer Brian Tyler. Feige explained that a new logo was commissioned for The Dark World because it was the first Marvel Studios film to not also begin with a distributor logo, due to the studio's acquisition by Disney. Each film in the phase features a hand or arm being cut off, a reference to the Star Wars franchise where that also happens often. Feige said this was not intentional to begin with, but once the studio realized the pattern they ensured it was continued through the end of the phase.

== Films ==
Phase Two films
Film	U.S. release date	Directed by	Screenplay by	Produced by
Iron Man 3	May 3, 2013	Shane Black	Drew Pearce & Shane Black	Kevin Feige
Thor: The Dark World	November 8, 2013	Alan Taylor	Christopher L. Yost and Christopher Markus & Stephen McFeely	Kevin Feige
Captain America: The Winter Soldier	April 4, 2014	Anthony and Joe Russo	Christopher Markus & Stephen McFeely	Kevin Feige
Guardians of the Galaxy	August 1, 2014	James Gunn	James Gunn and Nicole Perlman	Kevin Feige
Avengers: Age of Ultron	May 1, 2015	Joss Whedon	Joss Whedon	Kevin Feige
Ant-Man	July 17, 2015	Peyton Reed	Edgar Wright & Joe Cornish and Adam McKay & Paul Rudd	Kevin Feige

=== Iron Man 3 (2013) ===
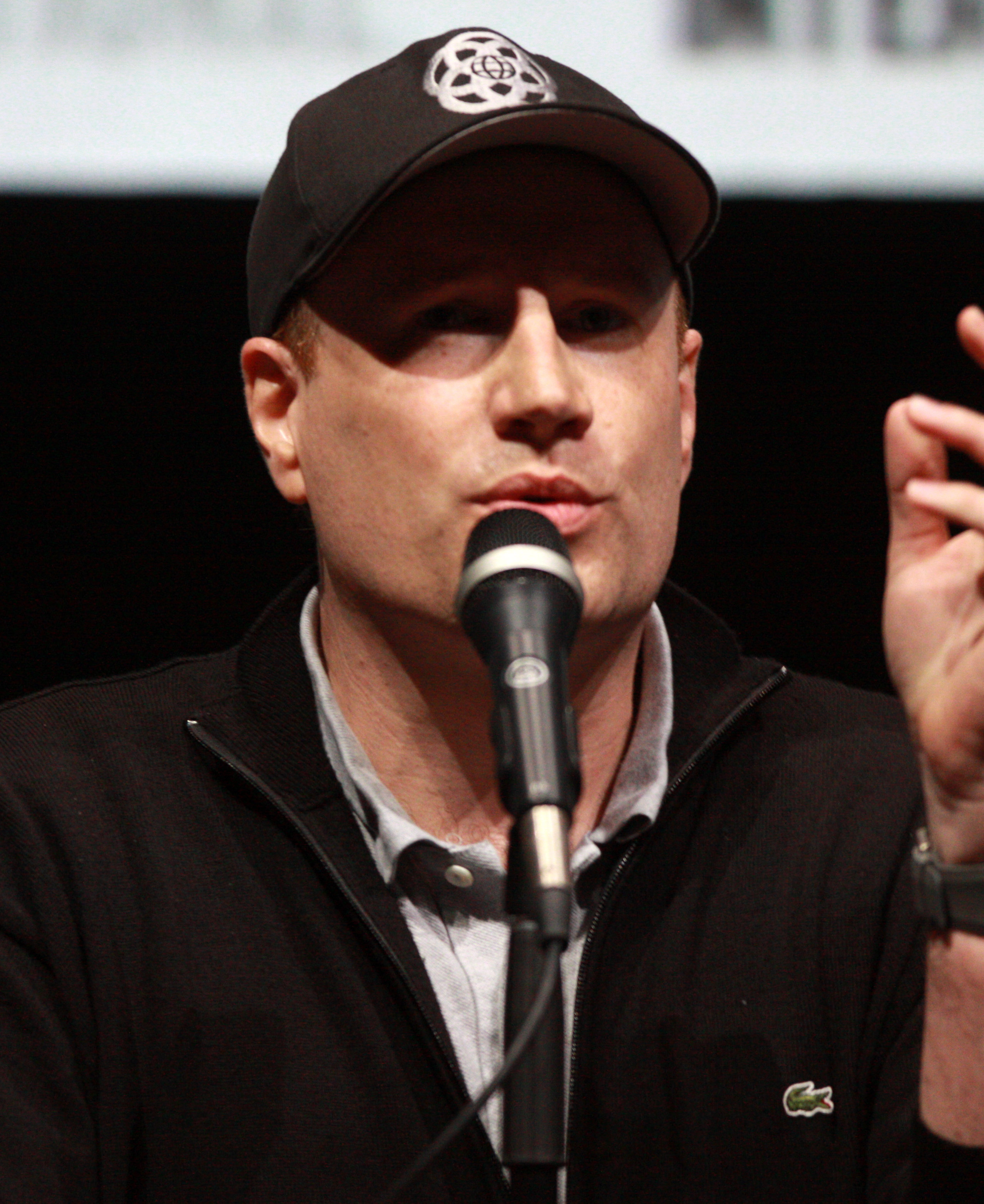
Kevin Feige produced every film in Phase Two.

Tony Stark faces a powerful enemy, the Mandarin, who attacks and destroys his mansion. Left to his own devices and battling post-traumatic stress disorder, Stark struggles to get to the bottom of a series of mysterious explosions.

A third Iron Man film was announced in late 2010. In February 2011, Marvel hired Shane Black to direct Iron Man 3. Black co-wrote the script with Drew Pearce. Robert Downey Jr., Gwyneth Paltrow, and Don Cheadle reprised their roles from the previous Iron Man films, with Guy Pearce and Ben Kingsley joining the cast as Aldrich Killian and Trevor Slattery, respectively. Filming began in May 2012 in North Carolina. Additional filming took place in southern Florida, China, and Los Angeles. Iron Man 3 premiered at Le Grand Rex in Paris, France, on April 14, 2013, and at the El Capitan Theatre in Hollywood, Los Angeles, on April 24. The film was released internationally on April 25, and in the United States on May 3.

Iron Man 3 is set in December 2012, after the events of The Avengers, with Tony Stark experiencing PTSD symptoms following the Battle of New York depicted in that film. Black explained, "that's an anxiety response to feeling inferior to the Avengers, but also to being humbled by sights he cannot possibly begin to understand or reconcile with the realities he's used to... There's a line in the movie about 'ever since that big guy with the hammer fell out of the sky, the rules have changed'. That's what we're dealing with here." Bruce Banner appears in a post-credits scene, with Mark Ruffalo reprising the role from The Avengers. Ruffalo said production on the film was close to wrapping when he ran into Downey at the 84th Academy Awards and was asked about "coming and doing a day". He said they "sort of spitballed that scene, then I came in and we shot for a couple of hours and laughed".

=== Thor: The Dark World (2013) ===
Thor reunites with astrophysicist Jane Foster as a series of portals, linking worlds at random, begin to appear. He discovers that Malekith and his army of Dark Elves have returned after thousands of years, and they seek a powerful weapon known as the Aether. Thor must join forces with his now-imprisoned brother Loki to stop them.

A sequel to Thor was announced in June 2011, with Chris Hemsworth reprising his role as Thor. Tom Hiddleston confirmed he would return as Loki in September, and Alan Taylor signed on to direct in December. The title was announced as Thor: The Dark World in July 2012, and Christopher Eccleston was cast as Malekith a month later. Production started in September 2012 in Surrey, England, with additional filming in Iceland and London. The film premiered at the Odeon Leicester Square in London on October 22, 2013. It was internationally released on October 30 and in the U.S. on November 8.

The film is set one year after the events of The Avengers. Chris Evans briefly makes a cameo appearance as Captain America when Loki shapeshifts into him while mocking Thor. Hiddleston wore the Captain America costume while standing in for Evans, before Evans came to shoot the scene. Hiddleston said, "I did an impression of Loki in the Captain America costume, and then they showed Chris [Evans] my performance on tape. It's him doing an impression of me doing an impression of him." James Gunn, the director of Guardians of the Galaxy, directed the mid-credits scene that features Benicio del Toro as the Collector. It reveals that the Tesseract from Phase One and the Aether are both Infinity Stones. Gunn was given the script for the scene and filmed it at the end of a second unit shooting day during production on Guardians of the Galaxy.

=== Captain America: The Winter Soldier (2014) ===
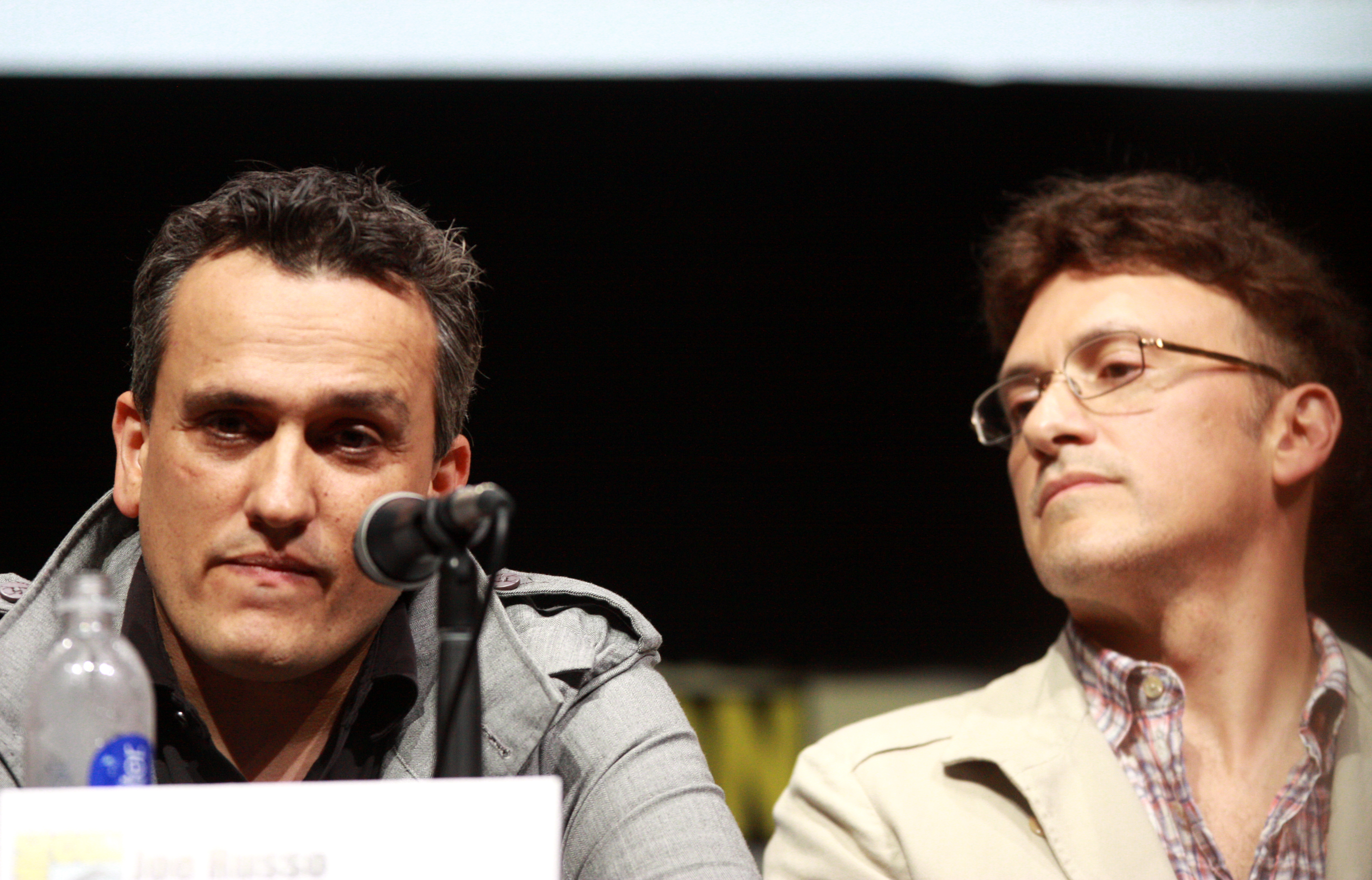
Joe and Anthony Russo, directors of Captain America: The Winter Soldier

Steve Rogers, now working with S.H.I.E.L.D., teams up with Natasha Romanoff / Black Widow and Sam Wilson / Falcon to expose a conspiracy which involves a mysterious assassin known only as the Winter Soldier.

A sequel to Captain America: The First Avenger (2011) was announced in April 2012. Anthony and Joe Russo were hired to direct in June, and it was officially titled Captain America: The Winter Soldier in July. Evans and Samuel L. Jackson were set to reprise their respective roles as Rogers and Nick Fury, and Scarlett Johansson would again play Romanoff. Sebastian Stan, who portrayed Bucky Barnes in The First Avenger, returned as the Winter Soldier, and Anthony Mackie joined the cast as Wilson. Production started in April 2013 in Manhattan Beach, California, and filming also took place in Washington, D.C., and Cleveland, Ohio. The film premiered in Hollywood, Los Angeles, on March 13, 2014. It was released internationally on March 26, and in the U.S. on April 4.

The film is set two years after the events of The Avengers. Stephen Strange is mentioned by the character Jasper Sitwell, with Maximiliano Hernández reprising his role as Sitwell from previous MCU media. A remodeled Stark Tower from The Avengers, now known as Avengers Tower, also makes an appearance in the film. Joss Whedon directed a post-credits scene featuring Baron Wolfgang von Strucker (Thomas Kretschmann), List (Henry Goodman), Pietro Maximoff (Aaron Taylor-Johnson), and Wanda Maximoff (Elizabeth Olsen), who appear in his film Avengers: Age of Ultron. The revelation that S.H.I.E.L.D. has been infiltrated by Hydra is the main plot point of the final six episodes of the first season of Agents of S.H.I.E.L.D., a television series set in the MCU.

=== Guardians of the Galaxy (2014) ===
Peter Quill / Star-Lord and a group of misfits—Gamora, Rocket, Drax the Destroyer, and Groot—fight to keep a powerful orb from the clutches of the villainous Ronan.

Nicole Perlman began writing a screenplay featuring the Guardians of the Galaxy in 2009. Marvel Studios announced it was developing the film in July 2012. It is directed by James Gunn, based on his and Perlman's screenplay. In February 2013, Chris Pratt was cast in the lead role of Peter Quill / Star-Lord. The film was shot at Shepperton Studios and in London from July to October 2013, and post-production work was completed on July 7, 2014. The film premiered on July 21 in Hollywood. Guardians of the Galaxy was released in the United Kingdom on July 31, and in the U.S. on August 1.

The film is set in 2014. Josh Brolin provided the voice and performance capture for Thanos, the supervillain who was introduced in The Avengers's mid-credits scene. Gunn said the film would be connected to Avengers: Infinity War (2018); the Collector explains the history of the Infinity Stones, and the orb that the characters fight over in the film is revealed to contain one of them. Several other objects of significance appear in the Collector's museum, including a Chitauri from The Avengers and a Dark Elf from The Dark World, among other characters. Ronan's race, the Kree, were first introduced in the Agents of S.H.I.E.L.D. episode "T.A.H.I.T.I." (2014).

=== Avengers: Age of Ultron (2015) ===
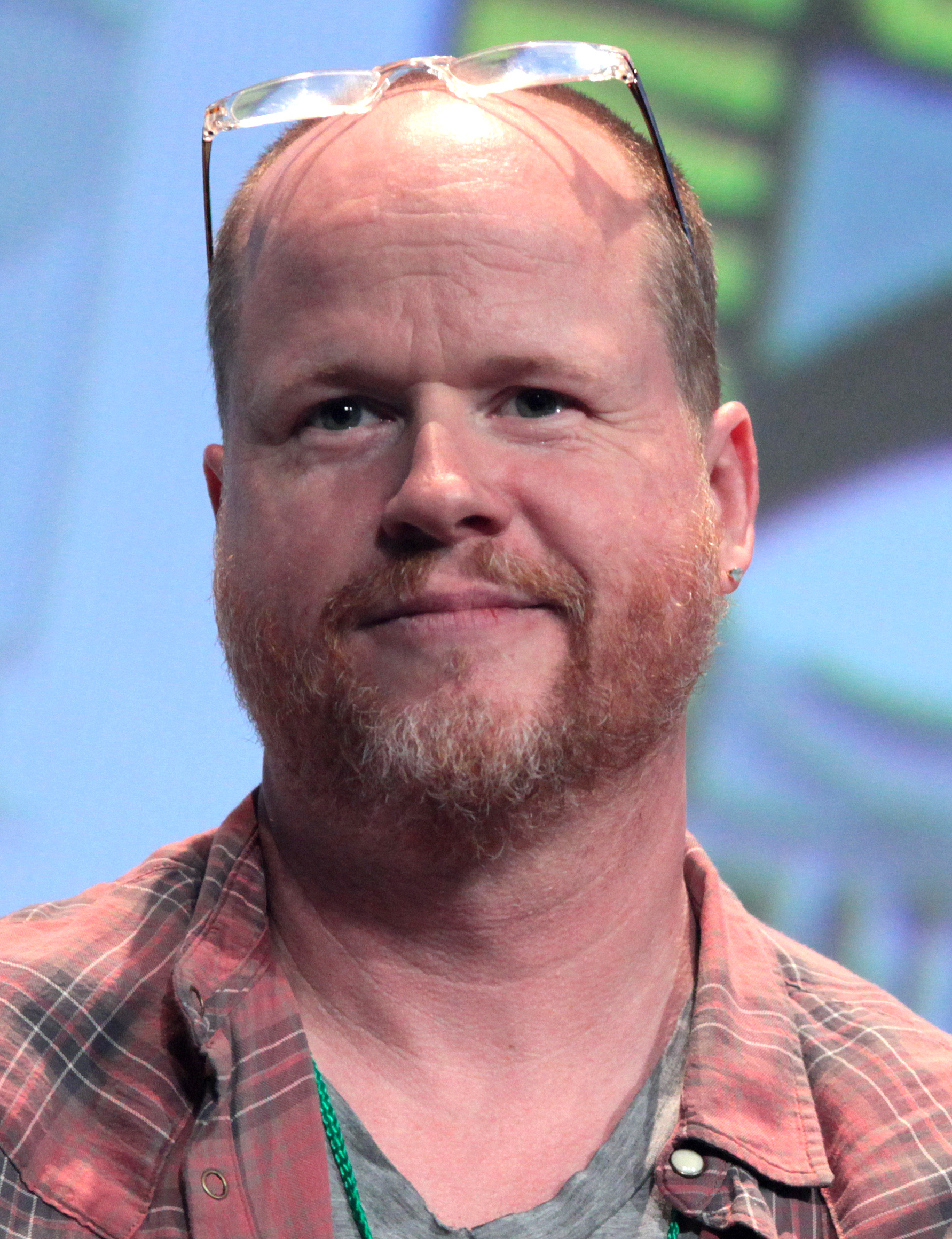
Joss Whedon, writer and director of Avengers: Age of Ultron, consulted on all of the films of Phase Two.

Captain America, Iron Man, Thor, the Hulk, Black Widow, and Hawkeye must work together as the Avengers to defeat Ultron, a technological enemy bent on human extinction, while encountering the powerful twins Pietro and Wanda Maximoff, as well as the new entity Vision.

Development on a sequel to The Avengers began in May 2012 after the success of the first film. In August 2012, Joss Whedon was signed to return as writer and director. In June 2013, Downey signed a deal to reprise the role of Iron Man for the second and third Avengers films. The subtitle Age of Ultron was announced in July 2013, and James Spader was cast as Ultron a month later. Second unit filming began on February 11, 2014, in Johannesburg, South Africa. Principal photography began in March 2014 at Shepperton Studios in Surrey, with additional footage filmed at Fort Bard and other locations in the Aosta Valley region of Italy, as well as Seoul, South Korea. Filming was completed on August 6. Age of Ultron had its world premiere in Hollywood, Los Angeles, on April 13, 2015, and was released internationally beginning April 22, and in the U.S. on May 1.

Loki's scepter from The Avengers is confirmed to be another of the Infinity Stones, specifically the Mind Stone. Brolin reappears as Thanos in the mid-credits scene wielding an Infinity Gauntlet, meant to hold all of the Infinity Stones. Andy Serkis portrays Ulysses Klaue, traditionally an antagonist of the hero Black Panther, and the film also references the Black Panther-related metal vibranium and nation of Wakanda. These references came ahead of the film Black Panther (2018), in which Serkis reprised his role as Klaue.

=== Ant-Man (2015) ===
Thief Scott Lang plots a heist with Dr. Hank Pym to safeguard the latter's Ant-Man technology, which allows its user to decrease in size but increase in strength.

Ant-Man is directed by Peyton Reed with a screenplay written by Edgar Wright & Joe Cornish and Adam McKay & Paul Rudd, from a story by Wright & Cornish, that includes both Scott Lang and Hank Pym. Wright was initially slated to direct the film, but left the project in May 2014 due to creative differences. In December 2013, Rudd was cast as Ant-Man, followed in January 2014 with the casting of Michael Douglas as Pym. Pre-production started in October 2013, and principal photography took place from August to December 2014, in San Francisco, at Pinewood Atlanta Studios in Fayette County, Georgia, and Downtown Atlanta. Ant-Man had its world premiere in Hollywood, Los Angeles, on June 29, 2015, and was released in France on July 14, and in the U.S. on July 17.

The film is set several months after Age of Ultron. Hayley Atwell and John Slattery reprise their MCU roles as Peggy Carter and Howard Stark, respectively. Scott Lang attempts to infiltrate the new Avengers headquarters in Upstate New York featured in Age of Ultron, and confronts Mackie's Wilson from The Winter Soldier. McKay and Rudd decided to add Wilson to Ant-Man after watching that film. The Russo brothers filmed the post-credit scene, which uses footage from Captain America: Civil War (2016), and features Mackie as Wilson, Evans as Rogers, and Stan as Barnes.

== Short films ==
Marvel One-Shots are a series of direct-to-video short films that are included as special features in the MCU films' Blu-ray and digital distribution releases. They are designed to be self-contained stories that provide more backstory for characters or events introduced in the films.

Phase Two short films
Film	U.S. release date	Director	Screenwriter	Producer	Home media release
Agent Carter	September 3, 2013 (digital); September 24, 2013 (physical)	Louis D'Esposito	Eric Pearson	Kevin Feige	Iron Man 3
All Hail the King	February 4, 2014 (digital); February 25, 2014 (physical)	Drew Pearce	Drew Pearce	Kevin Feige	Thor: The Dark World

== Timeline ==
Marvel Cinematic Universe: Phase Two timeline Full timeline at Marvel Cinematic Universe timeline The First Avenger and The Avengers included for reference
1943–1945	(The First Avenger)
1946	Agent Carter
1947–2011	
2012	(The Avengers)
2012	Iron Man 3
2013	All Hail the King
2013	The Dark World
2014	The Winter Soldier
2014	Guardians of the Galaxy
2015	Age of Ultron
2015	Ant-Man

Each film in Phase Two is set roughly in real time relating to The Avengers, simplifying the MCU timeline compared to the films of Phase One. Iron Man 3 is set around six months after The Avengers during Christmas, Thor: The Dark World is set one year after it, and Captain America: The Winter Soldier is two years after. Guardians of the Galaxy is explicitly set in 2014. Avengers: Age of Ultron and Ant-Man end the phase in 2015, with several months between them as in real life.

The One-Shot Agent Carter is set one year after Captain America: The First Avenger (2011), while All Hail the King takes place after Iron Man 3.

== Recurring cast and characters ==
List indicators

This section includes characters who have appeared in multiple Phase Two films, and have appeared in the billing block for at least one film.

- A dark grey cell indicates the character was not in the film.
- A ^{C} indicates an uncredited cameo role.
- An ^{OS} indicates the character appears in a One-Shot.
- A ^{V} indicates a voice-only role.

Characters are listed alphabetically by last name, as applicable.

Recurring cast and characters of Phase Two
Character	2013		2014		2015	
Character	Iron Man 3	Thor: The Dark World	Captain America: The Winter Soldier	Guardians of the Galaxy	Avengers: Age of Ultron	Ant-Man
Bruce Banner Hulk	Mark Ruffalo^{C}				Mark Ruffalo	
James "Bucky" Barnes Winter Soldier			Sebastian Stan			Sebastian Stan^{C}
Peggy Carter^{OS}			Hayley Atwell		Hayley Atwell	Hayley Atwell
Nick Fury			Samuel L. Jackson		Samuel L. Jackson	
Heimdall		Idris Elba			Idris Elba	
Maria Hill			Cobie Smulders		Cobie Smulders	
Pietro Maximoff Quicksilver			Aaron Taylor-Johnson^{C}		Aaron Taylor-Johnson	
Wanda Maximoff			Elizabeth Olsen^{C}		Elizabeth Olsen	
James "Rhodey" Rhodes War Machine / Iron Patriot	Don Cheadle				Don Cheadle	
Steve Rogers Captain America		Chris Evans^{C} (Note: Chris Evans makes a cameo appearance in Thor: The Dark World as Loki masquerading as Captain America.)	Chris Evans		Chris Evans	Chris Evans^{C}
Natasha Romanoff Black Widow			Scarlett Johansson		Scarlett Johansson	
Erik Selvig		Stellan Skarsgård			Stellan Skarsgård	
Tony Stark Iron Man	Robert Downey Jr.				Robert Downey Jr.	
Thor		Chris Hemsworth			Chris Hemsworth	
Taneleer Tivan The Collector		Benicio del Toro^{C}		Benicio del Toro		
Vision J.A.R.V.I.S.	Paul Bettany^{V}				Paul Bettany	
Sam Wilson Falcon			Anthony Mackie		Anthony Mackie	Anthony Mackie

== Music ==
Score albums for Phase Two films
Title	U.S. release date	Length	Composer(s)	Labels	Ref.
Iron Man 3 (Original Motion Picture Soundtrack)	April 30, 2013	75:53	Brian Tyler	Hollywood Records; Marvel Music	
Thor: The Dark World (Original Motion Picture Soundtrack)	November 12, 2013	77:11	Brian Tyler	Hollywood Records; Marvel Music	
Captain America: The Winter Soldier (Original Motion Picture Soundtrack)	April 1, 2014	74:32	Henry Jackman	Hollywood Records; Marvel Music	
Guardians of the Galaxy (Original Score)	July 29, 2014	64:34	Tyler Bates	Hollywood Records; Marvel Music	
Avengers: Age of Ultron (Original Motion Picture Soundtrack)	April 28, 2015	77:26	Brian Tyler and Danny Elfman	Hollywood Records; Marvel Music	
Ant-Man (Original Motion Picture Soundtrack)	July 17, 2015	65:20	Christophe Beck	Hollywood Records; Marvel Music	

Compilation albums for Phase Two films
Title	U.S. release date	Length	Labels	Ref.
Iron Man 3: Heroes Fall (Music Inspired by the Motion Picture)	April 30, 2013	44:36	Hollywood Records; Marvel Music	
Guardians of the Galaxy: Awesome Mix Vol. 1 (Original Motion Picture Soundtrack)	July 29, 2014	44:34	Hollywood Records; Marvel Music	

== Home media ==
Home media releases of Phase Two
Film	Digital release	DVD/Blu-ray release
Iron Man 3	September 3, 2013	September 24, 2013
Thor: The Dark World	February 4, 2014	February 25, 2014
Captain America: The Winter Soldier	August 19, 2014	September 9, 2014
Guardians of the Galaxy	November 18, 2014	December 9, 2014
Avengers: Age of Ultron	September 8, 2015	October 2, 2015
Ant-Man	November 17, 2015	December 8, 2015

In July 2015, Marvel announced a 13-disc box set titled "Marvel Cinematic Universe: Phase Two Collection", for release on December 8, 2015, exclusive to Amazon.com. The box set includes all six of the Phase Two films on Blu-ray, Blu-ray 3D, and digital, in a replica of the Orb from Guardians of the Galaxy, plus a bonus disc and exclusive memorabilia. The bonus disc includes all of the Marvel One-Shots with commentary, deleted scenes and pre-production features for each of the films, featurettes on the making of the post-credit scenes, and first looks at Captain America: Civil War, Doctor Strange (2016), and Guardians of the Galaxy Vol. 2 (2017).

== Reception ==
=== Box office performance ===
Box office performance of Phase Two
Film	U.S. release date	Box office gross			All-time ranking		Budget	Ref.
Film	U.S. release date	U.S. and Canada	Other territories	Worldwide	U.S. and Canada	Worldwide	Budget	Ref.
Iron Man 3	May 3, 2013	$409,013,994	$806,563,211	$1,215,577,205	39	25	$200 million	
Thor: The Dark World	November 8, 2013	$206,362,140	$438,421,000	$644,783,140	222	164	$150–170 million	
Captain America: The Winter Soldier	April 4, 2014	$259,766,572	$454,654,931	$714,421,503	134	134	$170–177 million	
Guardians of the Galaxy	August 1, 2014	$333,718,600	$439,631,547	$773,350,147	79	114	$170 million	
Avengers: Age of Ultron	May 1, 2015	$459,005,868	$946,012,180	$1,405,018,048	25	15	$250–444 million	
Ant-Man	July 17, 2015	$180,202,163	$339,109,802	$519,311,965	283	233	$130 million	
Total		$1,848,069,337	$3,424,362,577	$5,272,462,008	–	–	$1.07–1.291 billion	

=== Critical and public response ===
Critical and public response of Phase Two
Film	Critical		Public	
Film	Rotten Tomatoes	Metacritic	CinemaScore	PostTrak
Iron Man 3	79% (327 reviews)	62 (44 reviews)	A	—N/a
Thor: The Dark World	67% (289 reviews)	54 (44 reviews)	A−	—N/a
Captain America: The Winter Soldier	90% (311 reviews)	70 (48 reviews)	A	—N/a
Guardians of the Galaxy	91% (337 reviews)	76 (53 reviews)	A	90%
Avengers: Age of Ultron	75% (371 reviews)	66 (49 reviews)	A	90%
Ant-Man	83% (338 reviews)	64 (44 reviews)	A	—N/a

Liam Gaughan at Collider described Phase Two as a "fascinating Marvel era" that focused on developing the franchise's main characters after their introductions in Phase One. He ranked The Winter Soldier as the best film, enjoying its political commentary and action sequences, and also praised the team dynamic of Guardians of the Galaxy as well as the depiction of the Mandarin in Iron Man 3. Gaughan ranked The Dark World as the worst film and criticized some antagonists—Malekith, Ronan, and Darren Cross—for being underdeveloped. Looking back on positive elements of the phase, Kevin DelSignore of Comic Book Resources said it took "bold chances and the movies were highly entertaining, making this lot of MCU movies quite rewatchable". He praised different parts of each film and said The Winter Soldier was the best "non-team-up" film from the MCU. Looking at some negative elements of the phase, also for Comic Book Resources, David Harth said the "MCU formula [and homogenization] took full effect". He criticized the visual effects-heavy climaxes of each film. Though he praised The Winter Soldier, Harth felt it highlighted the flaws of the other films in the phase. Writing for CinemaBlend, Alexandra Ramos was more positive about the phase. She praised the exploration of Stark's mental health in Iron Man 3, said The Winter Soldier "bridged the gap between superhero movies and compelling drama", and found Age of Ultron to be underrated with a "gripping villain" and interesting new characters.

Several commentators have used ranked lists when revisiting the MCU phases. After Phase Four was released, Jeff Ames of ComingSoon.net placed Phase Two second-best after Phase Three. He felt the phase stumbled with The Dark World and Age of Ultron, but was positive about the other films and particularly praised The Winter Soldier. Ames stated, "If Joss Whedon gave the MCU its voice [with The Avengers], the Russos packed it full of muscle" with The Winter Soldier. In contrast, Rich Knight at CinemaBlend listed Phase Two last on his list and said the reasoning was "pretty clear", pointing to polarized fan responses to Iron Man 3 and its Mandarin twist, arguably "the very worst Marvel movie" in The Dark World, and the "not-as-good follow-up" Age of Ultron. Knight was more positive about the other films, particularly The Winter Soldier, but said while the phase "had its high points, the low points make it feel pretty lopsided... Not every phase can be the best." After Phase Five was released, The Mary Sue's Rachel Ulatowski also listed Phase Two last on her list. She said it had the least cohesive overarching storyline of all the phases, trying to continue individual franchises while also starting new ones and not coming together in Age of Ultron as well as Phase One was concluded in The Avengers. Ulatowski was critical of the quality of the films, particularly The Dark World and Age of Ultron, but did praise The Winter Soldier and Guardians of the Galaxy. She said those two films "couldn't hold up the disjointed and mediocre" phase.

=== Accolades ===
The films of Phase Two were nominated for four Academy Awards, three BAFTA Awards, one Grammy Award, forty Saturn Awards (winning nine), four Hugo Awards (winning one), twenty-two MTV Movie & TV Awards, and fourteen Visual Effects Society Awards, among others.

== Tie-in media ==
=== WHIH Newsfront ===
WHIH Newsfront is an in-universe current affairs show that serves as a viral marketing campaign for some of the MCU films, created in partnership with Google for YouTube. The campaign is an extension of the fictional news network WHIH World News, which is seen reporting on major events in the MCU. Leslie Bibb reprises her role as Christine Everhart from the Iron Man films. The initial videos released during July 2015 focus on the immediate aftermath of Age of Ultron while leading up to the events of Ant-Man, with Corey Stoll and Paul Rudd appearing in their respective roles of Darren Cross and Scott Lang from the latter.

=== Comic books ===
Tie-in comics of Phase Two
Title	No. of issues	Publication date		Writer(s)	Artist(s)
Title	No. of issues	First published	Last published	Writer(s)	Artist(s)
Marvel's Iron Man 3 Prelude	2	January 2, 2013	February 6, 2013	Christos Gage	Steve Kurth
Marvel's Thor: The Dark World Prelude	2	June 5, 2013	July 10, 2013	Craig Kyle and Christopher Yost	Scot Eaton and Ron Lim
Marvel's Captain America: The Winter Soldier Infinite Comic	1	January 28, 2014		Peter David	Rock He-Kim
Marvel's Guardians of the Galaxy Infinite Comic – Dangerous Prey	1	April 1, 2014		Dan Abnett and Andy Lanning	Andrea Di Vito
Marvel's Guardians of the Galaxy Prelude	2	April 2, 2014	May 28, 2014	Dan Abnett and Andy Lanning	Wellinton Alves
Marvel's Avengers: Age of Ultron Prelude – This Scepter'd Isle	1	February 3, 2015		Will Corona Pilgrim	Wellinton Alves
Marvel's Ant-Man Prelude	2	February 4, 2015	March 4, 2015	Will Corona Pilgrim	Miguel Sepulveda
Marvel's Ant-Man – Scott Lang: Small Time	1	March 3, 2015		Will Corona Pilgrim	Wellinton Alves and Daniel Govar

=== Video games ===
Tie-in video games of Phase Two
Title	U.S. release date	Publisher	Developer	Platforms
Iron Man 3: The Official Game	April 25, 2013	Gameloft		iOS and Android
Thor: The Dark World – The Official Game	October 31, 2013	Gameloft		iOS and Android
Captain America: The Winter Soldier – The Official Game	March 27, 2014	Gameloft		iOS, Android, and Windows Phone
Lego Marvel's Avengers	January 26, 2016	Warner Bros. Interactive; Entertainment	TT Games	PlayStation 4, Xbox One, Microsoft Windows, PlayStation 3, Xbox 360, Wii U, Nintendo 3DS, and PlayStation Vita
Lego Marvel's Avengers	March 10, 2016	Feral Interactive	TT Games	macOS
