= Marvel Cinematic Universe timeline =

Fictional timeline of media

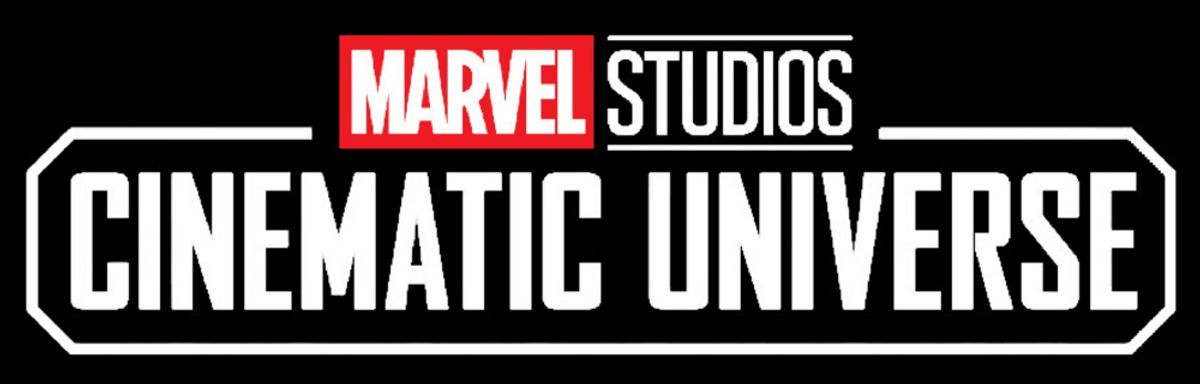

The fictional timeline of the Marvel Cinematic Universe (MCU) media franchise and shared universe is the continuity of events for several feature films, television series, television specials, short films, and the I Am Groot shorts, which are produced by Marvel Studios, as well as a group of Netflix series produced by Marvel Television. Within the multiverse of the MCU, the main setting for most media is the Earth-616 universe, which is also known as the "Sacred Timeline". Media set outside of the multiverse or in alternate universes are noted.

Most of the films in the franchise's Phase One and Phase Two follow a similar timeline order to their releases, but Phase Three saw many of the films overlapping with each other. The Phase Three film Avengers: Endgame (2019) includes a five-year time jump, with many subsequent releases in Phase Four, Phase Five, and Phase Six taking place after Endgame. The television series Loki (2021–2023) and What If...? (2021–2024) were the first properties to occur outside of the main timeline and explore alternative timelines and universes.

Marvel Studios has made several attempts to codify the MCU's events and address perceived continuity errors. An official timeline book, covering projects from the first four phases, was released in 2023. The book does not feature projects produced by other companies, such as Marvel Television's series which are loosely connected to the films, but it notes that these projects are part of the larger Marvel canon. In early 2024, Marvel Studios integrated Marvel Television's Netflix series into their Disney+ timeline. As of the Phase Six film Spider-Man: Brand New Day (2026), the "present day" in the MCU is 2028.

== Overview ==
During Phase One of the Marvel Cinematic Universe (MCU), Marvel Studios lined up some of their films' stories with references to one another, though they had no long-term plan for the shared universe's timeline at that point. In October 2008, Marvel Studios hired executive Brad Winderbaum, who had previously served as Louis D'Esposito's assistant on Iron Man (2008). One of his initial jobs was to create an official timeline for the MCU, which resulted in him creating the universe's zero point to be Tony Stark revealing he is Iron Man and realizing some events in Phase One overlapped, which he called "Fury's Big Week". This would be further expanded upon by writers Christopher Yost and Eric Pearson with the official canon tie-in comic titled Fury's Big Week. After being presented with the timeline, Yost and Pearson tried to follow the logic of each films' timeline when plotting the comic and received "the seal of approval" from producer Kevin Feige and Marvel Studios on the final timeline. Marvel released an official infographic detailing this timeline in May 2012 in its The Art of Marvel's The Avengers book. Wanting to simplify the in-universe timeline, the Phase Two films were set roughly in real time relating to The Avengers (2012). For Phase Three, directors the Russo brothers continued the use of real-time between films' releases. Winderbaum said the Phase Three films would actually "happen on top of each other" while being less "interlocked" as the Phase One films were.

When Spider-Man: Homecoming (2017) was being developed, director and co-writer Jon Watts was shown a scroll detailing the MCU timeline that was created by co-producer Eric Carroll when he first began working for Marvel Studios. Watts said the scroll included both where the continuity of the films lined up and did not line up, and when fully unfurled it extended beyond the length of a long conference table. This scroll was used as the basis to weave the continuity of Homecoming into the previous films, such as The Avengers. A title card in the film states that eight years pass between the end of The Avengers and the events of Captain America: Civil War (2016), which was widely criticized as a continuity error that broke the established MCU timeline, in which only four years should have passed. Additionally, dialogue in Civil War indicates that eight years pass between the end of Iron Man (2008) and the events of that film, despite the established continuity being closer to five or six years. Avengers: Infinity War (2018) co-director Joe Russo described the Homecoming eight years time jump as "very incorrect", and the mistake was ignored in Infinity War, which specified that its events were taking place only six years after The Avengers. The public response to the Homecoming mistake inspired Marvel Studios to release a new timeline for all three phases, and in November 2018 a timeline, specifying dates for the events in each film released to that point, was included as part of the sourcebook Marvel Studios: The First 10 Years, celebrating the 10-year anniversary of the MCU. Following Infinity War, the Russo brothers said future films would not necessarily be set according to real time as there are "a lot of very inventive ways of where the story can go from here".

"On the multiverse note, we recognize that there are stories—movies and series—that are canonical to Marvel but were created by different storytellers during different periods of Marvel's history. The timeline presented in this book is specific to the MCU's Sacred Timeline through Phase 4. But, as we move forward and dive deeper into the Multiverse Saga, you never know when timelines may just crash or converge (hint, hint/spoiler alert)."

— Kevin Feige, The Marvel Cinematic Universe: An Official Timeline

With Phase Four, Marvel Studios expanded into television series, which have greater interconnectivity with the MCU feature films than the series from Marvel Television. In October 2020, the Marvel section of Disney+ was restructured to include groupings of the films by phase, as well as a grouping that put the films in timeline order. By August 2022, Marvel Studios had hired an individual to keep track of the placement of the studio's projects in the MCU timeline. DK released a book titled The Marvel Cinematic Universe: An Official Timeline on October 24, 2023. The book, written by journalists Anthony Breznican, Amy Ratcliffe, and ReBecca Theodore-Vachon, was made in collaboration with Marvel Studios to provide an updated timeline of the MCU. Winderbaum said the book was the first time the studio was "officially laying out the timeline". The book covers Marvel Studios' projects in their first four phases as part of their "Sacred Timeline" on Earth-616, and addresses several perceived continuity errors, such as the timeline of Homecoming. In January 2024, during Echo's press tour, Winderbaum acknowledged that Marvel Studios had previously been "a little bit cagey" about what was part of their Sacred Timeline, noting how there had been the corporate divide between what Marvel Studios created and what Marvel Television created, despite the two companies being in communication and aware of what each other were doing. He continued that Marvel Studios had begun to see "how well integrated the [Marvel Television] stories are" and personally felt confident in saying Marvel's Netflix television series Daredevil (2015–2018) was part of the Sacred Timeline. Shortly after Winderbaum's comments, Daredevil and the remaining Netflix series were added to the Disney+ timeline, primarily alongside the MCU's Phase Two and Three content. They were added to Disney+ "fairly quickly" after Winderbaum realized during the press tour of Echo that the Netflix series' place in the MCU timeline was "not just assumed" and audiences wanted it to be confirmed. Winderbaum added that Disney+ was Marvel Studios' "medium to define the canon now".

In January 2026, Wonder Man showrunner Andrew Guest said Marvel Studios encourages writers never to have explicit date mentions in their projects, having characters avoid saying dates, and trying to be unspecific about referencing other MCU events.

== Depictions ==
=== Within the MCU ===
==== The Infinity Saga ====
Iron Man 2 is set six months after the events of Iron Man, and around the same time as Thor according to comments made by Nick Fury. Several of the Marvel One-Shots short films also occur around the events of Phase One films, including The Consultant (set after the events of Iron Man 2 and The Incredible Hulk), A Funny Thing Happened on the Way to Thor's Hammer (set before the events of Thor), Item 47 (set after The Avengers), and Agent Carter (set one year after the events of Captain America: The First Avenger). Iron Man 3 takes place about six months after The Avengers, during Christmas; Thor: The Dark World is set one year later; and Captain America: The Winter Soldier is two years after. Avengers: Age of Ultron and Ant-Man ended the phase in 2015, with several months passing between those films in-universe as in real life. The One-Shot All Hail the King is set after the events of Iron Man 3.

Captain America: Civil War begins a year after Age of Ultron, with Avengers: Infinity War set two years after that. Black Panther and Spider-Man: Homecoming respectively begin a week and several months after Civil War. Thor: Ragnarok begins four years after The Dark World and two years after Age of Ultron, around the same time as Civil War and Homecoming. Doctor Strange takes place over a whole year, ending in late 2016, bringing the film "up to date with the rest of the MCU". Both Guardians of the Galaxy and its sequel Vol. 2 are explicitly set in 2014, which Marvel Studios president Kevin Feige believed would create a four-year gap between Vol. 2 and Infinity War, though the other MCU films up to that point do not specify years onscreen.

Ant-Man and the Wasp and Captain Marvel are set earlier in the timeline; the former is set two years after Civil War and shortly before Infinity War, while the latter is set in 1995. Avengers: Endgame begins shortly after Infinity War and ends in 2023 after a five-year time jump. It confirms dates for several of the other films, including The Avengers in 2012, Thor: The Dark World in 2013, Guardians of the Galaxy in 2014, Doctor Strange around 2017, and Ant-Man and the Wasp in 2018 before Infinity War. Spider-Man: Far From Home begins eight months after Endgame in 2024.

==== The Multiverse Saga ====
Many of the properties in Phase Four are set after the events of Avengers: Endgame. WandaVision is set three weeks after the events of that film, and directly sets up Doctor Strange in the Multiverse of Madness; The Falcon and the Winter Soldier is set six months after Endgame. Shang-Chi and the Legend of the Ten Rings is also set after Endgame during the days leading to the Qingming Festival in early April, with She-Hulk: Attorney at Law set "a relatively short amount of time" after Shang-Chi. Eternals takes place around the same time as The Falcon and the Winter Soldier and Spider-Man: Far From Home, six to eight months after Endgame in 2024, while Spider-Man: No Way Home begins immediately after Far From Home, and continues over late 2024. Hawkeye takes place one year after the events of Endgame during the 2024 Christmas season.

Moon Knight is set after Hawkeye in early 2025, while Multiverse of Madness is set after Spider-Man: No Way Home. Ms. Marvel is set after Moon Knight, one to two years after Endgame. Thor: Love and Thunder is set after Endgame, eight and a half years after Thor broke up with Jane Foster, which had occurred by Ragnarok, and "a few weeks" since Thor joined the Guardians of the Galaxy. According to producer Nate Moore, Black Panther: Wakanda Forever is set after No Way Home and Eternals, "potentially concurrent" with Love and Thunder and Ant-Man and the Wasp: Quantumania, though it was placed earlier in the timeline between Moon Knight and She-Hulk: Attorney at Law with its addition to Disney+. The Guardians of the Galaxy Holiday Special is set "a fairly long time" after the events of Love and Thunder and before those of Guardians of the Galaxy Vol. 3.

The first season of Loki continues from the 2012 events seen in Endgame, but much of the series exists outside of time and space given the introduction of the Time Variance Authority. What If...? is set after Loki's first-season finale, exploring the various branching timelines of the newly created multiverse in which major moments from the MCU films occur differently. The second season of Loki begins immediately after the first-season finale, taking place outside of time and space while some events occur between the past, present, and future. Black Widow is set between Civil War and Infinity War, mostly taking place between the main plot of Civil War and its final scene. The first I Am Groot short is set between the end of Guardians of the Galaxy and the start of Guardians of the Galaxy Vol. 2, with the remaining shorts set between the end of Vol. 2 and its mid-credits scene. The special Werewolf by Night exists within the MCU but does not state "when, how or why". The director Michael Giacchino has "a very specific idea" of how the special fits into the MCU that had not been discussed with Marvel Studios.

In Phase Five, Echo is set five months after Hawkeye, in May 2025. Ant-Man and the Wasp: Quantumania is set in 2026, around the same time as the events of Black Panther: Wakanda Forever and the beginning of Ms. Marvel. Guardians of the Galaxy Vol. 3 is set after the Holiday Special. Secret Invasion is set in the "present day" of the MCU, thirty years after the events of Captain Marvel around 2026, after the events of Far From Home and Wakanda Forever. The Marvels is set in 2026, after Secret Invasion and Ms. Marvel. Agatha All Along is set in 2026, three years after the events of WandaVision. Captain America: Brave New World begins in November 2026, two years after The Falcon and the Winter Soldier, and is set primarily in the first few months of 2027. The first season of Daredevil: Born Again is set after Echo, with a prologue in the first episode set in late 2025, before jumping ahead a year to late 2026 and continuing into early 2027. Thunderbolts* is set later in 2027, after Brave New World, while Ironheart is set six months after Wakanda Forever in late 2025. Deadpool & Wolverine is set in 2024, largely on Earth-10005 and in the Void; it occurs after the events of Loki season two. Your Friendly Neighborhood Spider-Man is set outside the Sacred Timeline on Earth-86445, with the first season set around the events of Civil War.

In Phase Six, Eyes of Wakanda is set in several past time periods, with its respective episodes set in 1260 BC Crete during the Bronze Age, 1200 BC during the Trojan War, 1400 AD China at the start of the Ming dynasty, and 1896 AD Ethiopia during the First Italo-Ethiopian War. Wonder Man begins in late 2025 and concludes in mid-2027. The second season of Born Again is set six months after the first season, and concurrent with the events of The Punisher: One Last Kill television special, while the third season of Born Again is set six months after the second season. Spider-Man: Brand New Day is set four years after No Way Home in 2028. VisionQuest is set approximately 18 months after Agatha All Along; this is years after the events of WandaVision and around the events of Brand New Day. Avengers: Doomsday will also be set in 2028, 14 months after the end of Thunderbolts*, and after Brand New Day. The Fantastic Four: First Steps is set on Earth-828 in 1964. The first season of Marvel Zombies is set in 2023 on the alternate reality from the What If...? episode "What If... Zombies?!", five years after those events.

=== Codifying attempts ===
==== Phase One infographic (May 2012) ====
External image
- The Phase One Timeline infographic released by Marvel in May 2012

Marvel released an official infographic timeline for their Phase One films and One-Shots in May 2012 in its The Art of Marvel's The Avengers book; some of this information had previously been revealed in the official canon tie-in comic Fury's Big Week, which had confirmed that The Incredible Hulk, Iron Man 2, and Thor all took place within a week, a year before The Avengers. The infographic timeline's scale is shown in relation to Tony Stark revealing he is Iron Man at the end of Iron Man, with events set "BIM" (Before Iron Man) and "AIM" (After Iron Man).

==== Marvel Studios: The First 10 Years timeline (November 2018) ====
Marvel Studios: The First 10 Years timeline from November 2018
	Content
1943–1945	Captain America: The First Avenger
2010	Iron Man
2011	Iron Man 2, Thor
2012	The Avengers, Iron Man 3
2013	Thor: The Dark World
2014	Captain America: The Winter Soldier, Guardians of the Galaxy, Guardians of the Galaxy Vol. 2
2015	Avengers: Age of Ultron, Ant-Man
2016	Captain America: Civil War
2016–2017	Doctor Strange
2017	Black Panther, Thor: Ragnarok, Avengers: Infinity War

In November 2018, a timeline specifying dates for the events in each film released to that point was included as part of the sourcebook Marvel Studios: The First 10 Years, celebrating the 10-year anniversary of the MCU. This timeline ignores the two "eight-year" continuity errors as seen in Homecoming, but also contradicts the events of Black Panther and Infinity War by placing them in 2017. The Incredible Hulk, Spider-Man: Homecoming, and Ant-Man and the Wasp are discussed in the sourcebook, but their events are not included in the timeline.

==== Disney+ timeline (October 2020–present) ====
External image
- The Disney+ timeline order as of October 2026

The initial Disney+ timeline order in October 2020 was Captain America: The First Avenger, Captain Marvel, Iron Man, Iron Man 2, Thor, The Avengers, Thor: The Dark World, Iron Man 3, Captain America: The Winter Soldier, Guardians of the Galaxy, Guardians of the Galaxy Vol. 2, Avengers: Age of Ultron, Ant-Man, Captain America: Civil War, Black Panther, Doctor Strange, Thor: Ragnarok, Ant-Man and the Wasp, Avengers: Infinity War, and Avengers: Endgame. The Incredible Hulk, Spider-Man: Homecoming, and Spider-Man: Far From Home were excluded at this time since Disney did not have their distribution rights.

In June 2022, Homecoming became available on Disney+ in the United Kingdom and Australia, while Far From Home became available on Disney+ in Japan the following month; both were added to the Disney+ timeline in those territories. By August 2022, The Incredible Hulk was added to the Disney+ timeline in territories it was available in such as Spain and Japan. Homecoming became available in the United States and was added to the timeline in May 2023. Marvel Studios regained the distribution rights to The Incredible Hulk in June 2023, with it subsequently made available in the United States on Disney+. Far From Home became available in the United States in November 2023. No Way Home became available in the United States in April 2026.

To coincide with Echo's release in January 2024, all of Marvel's Netflix television series–including Daredevil, Jessica Jones, Luke Cage, Iron Fist, The Defenders, and The Punisher–were added to the Disney+ timeline, after they were made available on the platform in 2022. The series' placements were initially based on when their first seasons took place, with each season taking place on the timeline around the same time of their release. The first season of Daredevil is set after the events of The Avengers, and was placed after Guardians of the Galaxy Vol. 2 and I Am Groot and before Age of Ultron on the timeline. Jessica Jones's first season is set after that and is placed before Age of Ultron and Ant-Man. The second season of Daredevil takes place around six months after its first season, either around or shortly after the events of Ant-Man. The first season of Luke Cage picks up a few months after Jessica Jones, and part of the season takes place simultaneously with the events of Daredevil season 2. It was placed after Ant-Man on the timeline, and is followed shortly after by Iron Fist's first season, which references the events of Daredevil season 2 throughout the season, and was placed between Ant-Man and Civil War. These were followed by the events of the crossover series The Defenders, which takes place a few months after Daredevil's second season, and a month after Iron Fist season one, while being placed before Civil War on the timeline. The Defenders sets up elements of the second season of Jessica Jones, but it does not have a clear placement in the timeline, while Luke Cage season 2, Iron Fist season 2, Daredevil's third season, and Jessica Jones's third season are also set after The Defenders. The Punisher begins after the events of Daredevil season 2 before jumping ahead six months later, and was described as a stand-alone series, outside of the series leading up to The Defenders. Its first season also depicts some events from before the second season of Daredevil, which The Punisher star Jon Bernthal described as being "loose with chronology", and it was placed in-between Homecoming and Doctor Strange on the timeline.

In early February 2024, the Disney+ timeline was updated to include the placement of each season of Marvel Studios' series and the Netflix series, along with the creation of a new timeline featuring just the MCU films.

Disney+ complete timeline order (as of VisionQuest)
1. Eyes of Wakanda
2. Captain America: The First Avenger
3. Agent Carter
4. Captain Marvel
5. Iron Man
6. Iron Man 2
7. The Incredible Hulk
8. A Funny Thing Happened on the Way to Thor's Hammer
9. Thor
10. The Consultant
11. The Avengers
12. Item 47
13. Thor: The Dark World
14. Iron Man 3
15. All Hail the King
16. Captain America: The Winter Soldier
17. Guardians of the Galaxy
18. Guardians of the Galaxy Vol. 2
19. I Am Groot season 1 (Note: I Am Groot season 1 was originally separated on the Disney+ timeline by its episodes before the release of season 2, with episode 1 placed after Guardians of the Galaxy and episodes 2–5 placed after Vol. 2.)
20. I Am Groot season 2
21. Daredevil season 1
22. Jessica Jones season 1
23. Avengers: Age of Ultron
24. Ant-Man
25. Daredevil season 2
26. Luke Cage season 1
27. Iron Fist season 1
28. The Defenders
29. Captain America: Civil War
30. Black Widow
31. Black Panther
32. Spider-Man: Homecoming (Note: Homecoming, Far From Home, and No Way Home appearing on the Disney+ timeline is dependent on their availability.)
33. The Punisher season 1
34. Doctor Strange
35. Jessica Jones season 2
36. Luke Cage season 2
37. Iron Fist season 2
38. Daredevil season 3
39. Thor: Ragnarok
40. The Punisher season 2
41. Jessica Jones season 3
42. Ant-Man and the Wasp
43. Avengers: Infinity War
44. Avengers: Endgame
45. Loki season 1
46. What If...? season 1
47. Marvel Zombies
48. WandaVision
49. Shang-Chi and the Legend of the Ten Rings
50. The Falcon and the Winter Soldier
51. Spider-Man: Far From Home
52. Eternals
53. Spider-Man: No Way Home
54. Doctor Strange in the Multiverse of Madness
55. Hawkeye
56. Moon Knight
57. Black Panther: Wakanda Forever
58. Echo
59. She-Hulk: Attorney at Law
60. Ms. Marvel
61. Thor: Love and Thunder
62. Ironheart
63. Werewolf by Night
64. The Guardians of the Galaxy Holiday Special
65. Ant-Man and the Wasp: Quantumania
66. Guardians of the Galaxy Vol. 3
67. Secret Invasion
68. The Marvels
69. Loki season 2
70. What If...? season 2
71. Deadpool & Wolverine
72. Agatha All Along
73. What If...? season 3
74. Daredevil: Born Again season 1
75. Captain America: Brave New World
76. Thunderbolts*
77. The Fantastic Four: First Steps
78. Wonder Man
79. Daredevil: Born Again season 2
80. The Punisher: One Last Kill
81. VisionQuest

==== The Marvel Cinematic Universe: An Official Timeline (October 2023) ====
The Marvel Cinematic Universe: An Official Timeline order from October 2023
(Note: The seasonal descriptions featured in this table refer to those in the Northern Hemisphere, as used and noted in the book.)	Content
June 1943 – March 1945	Captain America: The First Avenger
1946	Agent Carter
Summer 1995	Captain Marvel
Early–Spring 2008	Iron Man
Spring 2010	Iron Man 2 & The Incredible Hulk & Thor
Summer 2010	The Consultant
Spring 2012	The Avengers, Item 47
Fall 2013	Thor: The Dark World
December 2013 – Early 2014	Iron Man 3
Early 2014	All Hail the King
Spring 2014	Captain America: The Winter Soldier
Summer 2014	Guardians of the Galaxy, I Am Groot episode 1
Fall 2014	Guardians of the Galaxy Vol. 2, I Am Groot episodes 2–5
Spring 2015	Avengers: Age of Ultron
Summer 2015	Ant-Man
Spring 2016	Captain America: Civil War
Spring–Summer 2016	Black Widow
Summer 2016	Black Panther
Fall 2016	Spider-Man: Homecoming
Fall 2016–2017	Doctor Strange
Fall 2017	Thor: Ragnarok
Spring 2018	Ant-Man and the Wasp, Avengers: Infinity War
Fall 2023	Avengers: Endgame, WandaVision
Spring 2024	Shang-Chi and the Legend of the Ten Rings, The Falcon and the Winter Soldier episodes 1–5
Summer 2024	Spider-Man: Far From Home, The Falcon and the Winter Soldier episode 6
Fall 2024	She-Hulk: Attorney at Law episode 1, Eternals, Spider-Man: No Way Home, Doctor Strange in the Multiverse of Madness
December 2024	Hawkeye
Spring 2025	She-Hulk: Attorney at Law episodes 2–3, Moon Knight, Black Panther: Wakanda Forever
Summer 2025	She-Hulk: Attorney at Law episodes 4–8
Fall 2025	She-Hulk: Attorney at Law episode 9, Ms. Marvel, Thor: Love and Thunder, Werewolf by Night
December 2025	The Guardians of the Galaxy Holiday Special

External image
- The Official Timeline (archive) released by Marvel in October 2023

In the book The Marvel Cinematic Universe: An Official Timeline, released in October 2023, the timeline for the first four phases of the MCU is detailed, presenting the timeline for content that occurs in the "Sacred Timeline" of Earth-616, the main timeline and universe of the MCU, but does not include the Netflix series as they were not yet officially considered part of the Sacred Timeline up to that point. The book addresses several continuity errors through messages from Miss Minutes, the mascot of the Time Variance Authority (TVA), and was written with an in-universe perspective as if it was a TVA guidebook. These included placing Homecoming as occurring in late 2016 while noting that the eight years timeframe in the film was incorrect and confirming that four years had passed in-universe from The Avengers.

The book also places Iron Man in early 2008, the same as its year of release; Iron Man 2, The Incredible Hulk, and Thor as occurring around the same time in early 2010; Iron Man 3 from December 22–25, 2013, before ending in early 2014; Doctor Strange as starting in late 2016 after Homecoming and occurring through 2017 before Thor: Ragnarok, contradicting the film's co-writer C. Robert Cargill's statement on its timeline; Black Panther in mid-2016, starting after Black Widow and before Civil War's ending; Ant-Man and the Wasp and Infinity War in early 2018; Endgame primarily in late 2023 with WandaVision set shortly after; Shang-Chi and the Legend of the Ten Rings in early 2024 in between WandaVision and The Falcon and the Winter Soldier, the latter of which is placed from early-to-mid-2024; Far From Home and the start of No Way Home in mid-2024 during The Falcon and the Winter Soldier; She-Hulk starting in late 2024, before Eternals, which takes place during No Way Home, which is primarily followed by Multiverse of Madness, also in late 2024; No Way Home ending in December 2024, right before Hawkeye, also placed in that month; She-Hulk primarily occurring through early 2025, before Moon Knight and Wakanda Forever, and until late 2025; Ms. Marvel and Love and Thunder following in late 2025; and dates Werewolf by Night after them in late 2025, which was noted as seemingly being accurate but that "magical influences" made determining its placement uncertain.

== Timeline ==
The following diagram represents the Marvel Cinematic Universe timeline for media released by Marvel Studios as well as the Netflix series by Marvel Television. A project's placement on the timeline is determined by explicit date references within it or another project through dialogue (for example, Tony Stark says "Thanos has been inside my head for six years. Since he sent an army to New York..." placing Avengers: Infinity War in 2018) or title cards (for example, Guardians of the Galaxy set in 2014, while Avengers: Endgame dates Thor: The Dark World as being in 2013), with The Marvel Cinematic Universe: An Official Timeline then used to determine placement, followed by the Disney+ timeline if needed. Its placement is meant to represent when the majority of the project occurs.

Loki and What If...? are excluded from the diagram because they occur outside of the main timeline with no set timeframe. Werewolf by Night is also excluded given the special explicitly does not indicate where it takes place in the MCU. Disney+'s timeline order places the first seasons of Loki and What If...? between Avengers: Endgame and WandaVision, their second seasons after The Marvels, and the third season of What If...? between Agatha All Along and Daredevil: Born Again, with Werewolf by Night after Love and Thunder; Werewolf by Night is also placed here in The Marvel Cinematic Universe: An Official Timeline.

Key:
- Occurs on the MCU's Sacred Timeline
- Occurs outside the MCU's Sacred Timeline at a set timeframe

Marvel Cinematic Universe timeline (as of VisionQuest)
1260 BC	Eyes of Wakanda ep. 1
1259 BC–1201 BC	
1200 BC	Eyes of Wakanda ep. 2
1199 BC–1399	
1400	Eyes of Wakanda ep. 3
1401–1895	
1896	Eyes of Wakanda ep. 4
1897–1942	
1943–1945	The First Avenger
1946	Agent Carter
1947–1963	
1964	The Fantastic Four: First Steps (Note: The Fantastic Four: First Steps takes place on Earth-828 in 1964.)
1965–1994	
1995	Captain Marvel
1996–2009	
2010	Iron Man
2011	Iron Man 2
2011	The Incredible Hulk
2011	A Funny Thing...
2011	Thor
2011	The Consultant
2012	The Avengers
2012	Item 47
2013	The Dark World
2013	Iron Man 3
2014	All Hail the King
2014	The Winter Soldier
2014	Guardians of the Galaxy
2014	I Am Groot ep. 1
2014	Guardians of the Galaxy Vol. 2
2014	I Am Groot eps. 2–10
2015	Daredevil season 1
2015	Jessica Jones season 1
2015	Age of Ultron
2015	Ant-Man
2015	Daredevil season 2
2015	Luke Cage season 1
2016	Iron Fist season 1
2016	The Defenders
2016	Civil War
2016	Your Friendly Neighborhood; Spider-Man season 1 (Note: Your Friendly Neighborhood Spider-Man season 1 takes place on Earth-86445 around the events of Civil War.)
2016	Black Widow
2016	Black Panther
2016	Homecoming
2016	The Punisher season 1
2016–2017	Doctor Strange
2017	Jessica Jones season 2
2017	Luke Cage season 2
2017	Iron Fist season 2
2017	Daredevil season 3
2017	Ragnarok
2018	The Punisher season 2
2018	Jessica Jones season 3
2018	Ant-Man and the Wasp
2018	Infinity War
2019–2022	
2023	Endgame
2023	Marvel Zombies season 1 (Note: Marvel Zombies takes place on the alternate reality from the What If...? episode "What If... Zombies?!" (2021).)
2023	WandaVision
2024	Deadpool & Wolverine (Note: Deadpool & Wolverine takes place on Earth-10005 and in the Void; it occurs after the events of Loki season 2.)
2024	Shang-Chi
2024	The Falcon and the Winter Soldier
2024	Far From Home
2024	Eternals
2024	No Way Home
2024	Multiverse of Madness
2024	Hawkeye
2025	Moon Knight
2025	Wakanda Forever
2025	Echo
2025	She-Hulk
2025	Ms. Marvel
2025	Love and Thunder
2025	Ironheart
2025	The Guardians of the Galaxy; Holiday Special
2025–2027	Wonder Man
2026	Quantumania
2026	Guardians of the Galaxy Vol. 3
2026	Secret Invasion
2026	The Marvels
2026	Agatha All Along
2026	Born Again season 1 ep. 1
2027	Born Again season 1 eps. 2–9
2027	Brave New World
2027	Thunderbolts*
2027	Born Again season 2
2027	The Punisher: One Last Kill
2028	Brand New Day
2028	VisionQuest

== Commentary ==
Thomas Bacon of Screen Rant described the Marvel Studios: The First 10 Years timeline as "the closest Marvel has yet come to making an official statement on just when the different MCU events are set", bringing "some sense of balance to the MCU continuity", despite some mistakes still present in this timeline. Regarding the initial Disney+ timeline, Bacon felt the placement of Thor: The Dark World between The Avengers and Iron Man 3 and Black Panther after Captain America: Civil War in this timeline corrected "previous issues" with their placement in the First 10 Years timeline, and was glad Disney and Marvel "recognize[d] it's possible to watch these movies in anything other than release order", "legitimiz[ing]" this viewing experience. Julia Alexander at The Verge agreed with Bacon that it "seems like Disney finally understands how [some viewers] want to watch Marvel movies".

With the release of Thor: Love and Thunder on Disney+ in September 2022, Bacon and his colleague Molly Jae Weinstein noted how the film's placement in the timeline order section on the platform seemed incorrect, with Bacon saying it made "no sense" given dialogue and events in the film that contradicted this placement, and also pointing out how Shang-Chi and Moon Knight's placements also ignored dating information given in each. Bacon said, "The MCU's timeline is now complicated by the sheer volume of Marvel films and TV shows currently in production, because even Marvel's key decision-makers don't really know quite what order things will be released." Unlike the earlier phases where each new project was the next chronological title in the timeline, Phase Four "has hopped around the timeline with impunity", which in turn made it "rather messy". Bacon added how viewers have noted the Disney+ timeline was "deeply flawed" with "numerous contradictions". With the release of The Guardians of the Galaxy Holiday Special, Bacon believed its placement on the Disney+ timeline "fixed" Love and Thunder's placement, thinking that film should be placed in late 2024 on the timeline. He also pointed out how new projects typically get added to the end of the Disney+ timeline, "even when such placements can't possibly be right". In November 2022, Bacon noted how Far From Home's appearance in the Disney+ timeline between The Falcon and the Winter Soldier and Shang-Chi could not be correct given story points in each of those projects indicating where they fell in the timeline, and hoped Marvel would correct these mistakes as it had done previously with Black Widow and Black Panther.

To coincide with the release of The Marvel Cinematic Universe: An Official Timeline in October 2023, Disney+ adjusted its placement of Shang-Chi on the timeline to be between WandaVision and The Falcon and the Winter Soldier, which Aaron Perine of ComicBook.com felt made "a lot of sense" given the prior determinations of the film's timeline. He said it corrected the prior "mistake" in its placement, which he noted had sparked "[a] lot of debate" among fans, calling it a "clerical error" that was "easily rectified by changing some code" on the platform rather than Marvel changing when the film took place in-universe. Alexander Valentino of Screen Rant said that before the timeline book's release, the Disney+ timeline order "was the closest thing to a definitive order of events" while noting it had also been unclear given the franchises's use of flashbacks, time travel, and the multiverse. He said the platform's order was "shockingly accurate" compared to Marvel's official timeline as detailed in the book, noting that Disney+ conceded to change its placement of Shang-Chi in accordance with the timeline book, which he called a "definitive map" of the MCU's chronology and an "important keystone" to understand the franchise's timeline, and that it resolved debates surrounding the timeline placements and canon status of several Marvel properties. Joshua Lapin-Bertone from Popverse enjoyed An Official Timeline featuring Miss Minutes and the TVA when addressing past discrepancies, as it provided "a sense of personality and fun to the book". Collider's Jeffrey Harris appreciated Marvel Studios acknowledging its continuity errors such as Homecoming with "an appropriate, self-deprecating sense of humor" through Miss Minutes, that he likened to Marvel Comics' Marvel No-Prize. He added that the book's authors "do their best to offer an in-universe, canonical explanation... [t]hat is probably the best explanation that fans can hope for".

After all of Marvel Television's Netflix series were added to the Disney+ timeline in January 2024, commentators noted that this extended the total runtime of the MCU by a significant amount, as the Netflix series totaled 161 hours of content. Rotem Rusak at Nerdist noted that the series' canon status in the MCU had been a subject of debate for several years, and called it a "pretty big deal" that all of the series were added to the franchise's official timeline. She believed this was definitive and sent a "pretty clear message" that the series were canon to the MCU, and that this alleviated concerns that only certain aspects of the series would be carried over into the franchise. IGN's Ryan Dinsdale said this was "the first time" the series were listed as part of the official MCU timeline, and noted this came at a time when the MCU was considered to be bloated after the total runtime of content in Phase Four lasted around 54 hours compared to Phase One's runtime of slightly over 12 hours. Richard Fink and Jack Deegan at MovieWeb considered the Netflix series' timeline easy to follow as it was the same as their release order, which he noted was the same timeline order used by Disney+. Andy Behbakht of Screen Rant felt the series' addition to the timeline was a "change of heart" behind-the-scenes and that it was likely to inspire hope to see other Marvel series officially acknowledged as part of the timeline.
