= Characters of the Marvel Cinematic Universe: M–Z =

== M ==
=== Mary MacPherran / Titania ===
Mary MacPherran (portrayed by Jameela Jamil), also known as Titania, is a social media influencer with incredible strength who is obsessed with She-Hulk, ultimately becoming her rival.

As of 2026, the character has appeared in one project: the Disney+ series She-Hulk: Attorney at Law (2022).

=== Makkari ===
Makkari (portrayed by Lauren Ridloff) is an Eternal who can move at superhuman speeds. She is implied to harbour romantic feelings for Druig.

The character is the first deaf superhero in the MCU. Ridloff stated that she started running and muscle-building to have "the symmetry of somebody who looks like a sprinter".

As of 2026, the character has appeared in one project: the film Eternals (2021).

=== Malekith the Accursed ===
Malekith the Accursed (portrayed by Christopher Eccleston) is the king of the Dark Elves who faces Thor in 2013. Eons ago, he faces Odin's father Bor and is defeated, being exiled to an alternate reality. He is awakened when the Aether is released, and he merges with it, plotting to submerge Earth in darkness during the convergence. He is killed when his own ship crushes him on Svartalfheim.

As of 2026, the character has appeared in one project: the film Thor: The Dark World (2013). An alternate universe variant of Malekith (voiced by Steven French) appeared in one project: the Disney+ animated series What If...? (2021–2024).

=== Flint Marko / Sandman ===
As of 2026, an alternate universe variant of Flint Marko—a petty thief who gained the ability to transform into sand, becoming known as Sandman—has appeared in one project: the film Spider-Man: No Way Home (2021; motion-captured by Jon Watts and voiced by Thomas Haden Church). Another variant will be introduced in the comic book series Your Friendly Neighborhood Spider-Man Season 2 (2026–2027). Church reprises his role from Sam Raimi's Spider-Man film series (2002–2007).

=== Martinex ===
Martinex (portrayed by Michael Rosenbaum) is a member of Stakar Ogord's team of Ravagers. He visits Yondu Udonta on Contraxia along with Stakar to remind him that he is in exile for breaking the Ravagers' code. After Yondu sacrifices himself to save Peter Quill, Martinex and Stakar are moved by his sacrifice, and he and the other Ravagers attend his funeral. The two of them decide to bring the rest of the team back together to honor him.

As of 2026, the character has appeared in two projects: the films Guardians of the Galaxy Vol. 2 (2017) and Guardians of the Galaxy Vol. 3 (2023).

=== Mar-Vell / Wendy Lawson ===
Mar-Vell (portrayed by Annette Bening) is a Kree scientist who rejected her species' war with the Skrulls. She fled to Earth in the 1980s and adopted the alias of Dr. Wendy Lawson, a physicist at Project Pegasus. Using the Tesseract, she sought to develop an experimental engine that would have allowed the Skrulls to settle beyond the reach of the Kree Empire. She is killed by Yon-Rogg, though she is able to instruct Carol Danvers to destroy the engine before Yon-Rogg is able to seize the device. The Supreme Intelligence later takes on her appearance while conversing with Danvers.

As of 2026, the character has appeared in one project: the film Captain Marvel (2019). An alternate universe variant of Mar-Vell (voiced by Keri Tombazian) appeared in one project: the Disney+ animated series What If...?.

=== Mila Masaryk / Unicorn ===
Mila Masaryk (voiced by Sarah Natochenny) is a Russian criminal in an alternate universe who is part of a group of Russian bank robbers. During a robbery, Mila's accomplices—Dmitri Smerdyakov, Mikhail Sytsevich, and Roxanna Volkov—are arrested, while she escapes with the stolen money and takes it to the renegade scientist Otto Octavius, who sells Mila a high-tech helmet that shoots lasers and analyzes and predicts opponent's movement patterns. Mila, calling herself Unicorn, uses the helmet to help her cohorts escape from prison and nearly kills Spider-Man, but is stopped by Mikhail, who removes Mila's helmet, and Spider-Man apprehends them both.

As of 2026, the character has appeared in one project: the Disney+ animated series Your Friendly Neighborhood Spider-Man (2025–present).

=== Phineas Mason ===
Phineas Mason (portrayed by Michael Chernus) is a weapons maker and part of a salvage company alongside Adrian Toomes, Herman Schultz, and Jackson Brice. When the salvaging company goes out of business due to the Department of Damage Control, Mason helps Toomes steal leftover technology from the Avengers' battles and build advanced weapons out of the technology, such as Toomes's flight suit and modified versions of Brock Rumlow's vibro-blast emitting gauntlets. While his assistants were defeated by Spider-Man and arrested by the authorities, Mason's fate is left unknown.

As of 2026, the character has appeared in one project: the film Spider-Man: Homecoming (2017).

=== Rick Mason ===
Rick Mason (portrayed by O-T Fagbenle) is an old friend of Natasha Romanoff's S.H.I.E.L.D. past. In 2016, he helps her while she is a fugitive. In 2026, he assists Nick Fury.

As of 2026, the character has appeared in two projects: the film Black Widow (2021); and the Disney+ series Secret Invasion (2023).

=== Ebony Maw ===
Ebony Maw (voiced and portrayed via motion capture by Tom Vaughan-Lawlor) is an adopted son of Thanos and member of the Black Order who is killed in space after being defeated by Tony Stark and Peter Parker. A past version of Maw from 2014 travels through time with Thanos's forces to stop the Avengers from foiling his plans. However, they are all disintegrated when Stark uses the Infinity Gauntlet.

As of 2026, the character has appeared in one project: the film Avengers: Infinity War (2018). Alternate universe variants of Maw appeared in two projects: the film Avengers: Endgame (2019); and the Disney+ animated series What If...?.

=== Billy Maximoff / William Kaplan ===
William "Billy" Maximoff (portrayed by Baylen Bielitz as a five-year old and Julian Hilliard as a ten-year old) is the son of Wanda Maximoff and Vision, and the younger twin brother of Tommy Maximoff. He was created by Wanda using chaos magic within the Westview anomaly in Westview, New Jersey, a reality modeled after a fictional sitcom inspired by those Wanda watched as a child whose residents are mind-controlled by Wanda. After Wanda "gives birth" to Billy, he ages rapidly to five and ten years old, acquiring supernatural abilities: Billy harnesses chaos magic like his mother. Following a battle between Wanda and the witch Agatha Harkness, Wanda dissolves the Westview anomaly, erasing the imaginary existence of Billy. Billy reincarnates upon his "death" in the body of William Kaplan (portrayed by Joe Locke), a 13-year-old from Westview's neighboring town of Eastview, who was killed in a car accident after leaving his bar mitzvah early; stricken with amnesia, Billy then assumes William's identity, unaware of his past life.

Following Wanda's death, Billy's curiosity about the anomaly that occurred the day of his car crash leads him to investigate and learn that Wanda and Vision had children in Westview, one of whom had the same abilities that he has. Realizing his true identity, he becomes determined to find his lost brother. He frees Harkness from a spell placed by Wanda and asks that she take him on the Witches' Road, a magical pathway where one's desires are granted after completing a series of "trials". In the final trial, Billy locates Tommy's soul and places it in the body of a drowning boy. After discovering that the Witches' Road was a myth created by Harkness and that he had willed it into existence, he accepts the mentorship of Harkness, who dies and returns as a ghost, and sets out to search for Tommy. Billy briefly reunites with Tommy through an astral projection before finding him, and helping him reactivate Vision.

As of 2026, the character has appeared in three projects: the Disney+ series WandaVision (2021), Agatha All Along (2024) and VisionQuest (2026). An alternate universe variant of Billy appeared in one project: the film Doctor Strange in the Multiverse of Madness (2022).

==== Kaplan family ====
William Kaplan's family plays an important role in his life. Jeff (portrayed by Paul Adelstein) and Rebecca Kaplan (portrayed by Maria Dizzia) are William's parents.

As of 2026, the characters have appeared in one project: the Disney+ series Agatha All Along.

=== Pietro Maximoff ===
Pietro Maximoff (portrayed by Aaron Taylor-Johnson as an adult and Gabriel Gurevich as a child) is Wanda Maximoff's twin brother. They are introduced as Hydra assets, both acquiring superhuman powers after volunteering to be experimented upon by the Mind Stone, with Pietro gaining superhuman speed. Harboring a lifelong hatred for American arms manufacturer Tony Stark, whose bombs killed their parents, they side with Ultron against the Avengers before later switching sides. In the final conflict with Ultron, Pietro dies a hero's death, saving the lives of Clint Barton and a Sokovian boy. In 2023, the witch Agatha Harkness forces Westview resident Ralph Bohner (portrayed by Evan Peters) to impersonate Pietro to get close to Wanda within her created alternate reality.

The character's reception has been lukewarm with complaints that the character or his power was not developed enough compared to the comic book version or 20th Century Fox's X-Men film series version.

As of 2026, the character has appeared in three projects: the films Captain America: The Winter Soldier (2014) (mid-credits cameo) and Avengers: Age of Ultron (2015); and the Disney+ series WandaVision.

=== Tommy Maximoff / Thomas Shepherd ===
Thomas "Tommy" Maximoff (portrayed by Gavin Borders as a five-year old and Jett Klyne as a ten-year old) is the son of Wanda Maximoff and Vision, and the older twin brother of Billy Maximoff. He was created by Wanda using chaos magic within the Westview anomaly in Westview, New Jersey, a reality modeled after a fictional sitcom inspired by those Wanda watched as a child whose residents are mind-controlled by Wanda. After Wanda "gives birth" to Tommy, he ages rapidly to five and ten years old, acquiring supernatural abilities: Tommy gains superhuman speed like his uncle "Pietro Maximoff" (in reality, Ralph Bohner in disguise). Following a battle between Wanda and the witch Agatha Harkness, Wanda dissolves the Westview anomaly, erasing the imaginary existence of Tommy. While traveling the Witches' Road, Agatha helps a reincarnated Billy connect with Tommy's soul and place it in the body of Thomas Shepherd (portrayed by Ruaridh Mollica), a teenager who had drowned during a botched prank.

Tommy retained the memories of Thomas Shepherd alongside his own, but when speaking to police interrogators, he described the situation as if someone else had taken up residence in his brain as if he were living two lives. However, Tommy was deemed insane and was committed to a mental institution. After meeting the pickpocket Lisa Molinari, they escape following their arrival at a residential center within the Saint Mabyn Psychiatric Sanatorium and begin living as street thieves. Thomas is subsequently kidnapped by Paladin, who takes him back to Saint Mabyn to use him as bait for Vision; Vision then rescues him and manages to escape from Paladin with him. Following a mission at a gala, Tommy discovers that Vision has been kept Ultron's existence a secret, who has taken control of Vision’s body following a confrontation with the android Jocasta.

Following these events he comes to terms with his identity as Tommy Maximoff and Speed. He uses his super-speed and also reunites with his brother Billy to save his father; Vision. They also ensure the population London is not destroyed.

As of 2026, the character has appeared in three projects: the Disney+ series WandaVision, Agatha All Along, and VisionQuest. An alternate universe variant of Tommy appeared in one project: the film Doctor Strange in the Multiverse of Madness.

=== M'Baku ===
M'Baku (portrayed by Winston Duke) is the leader of the renegade Jabari Tribe, who shun Wakanda's technological society and have a religious reverence for gorillas, such as decorating their armor with white gorilla pelts and worshiping the ape god, Hanuman, as a part of a complex Indo-African religion rather than the Panther god Bast. In Black Panther, M'Baku challenges T'Challa for control of Wakanda. When he is defeated in combat, the latter convinces him to yield. M'Baku returns the favor by looking after the wounded T'Challa following the latter's fight with N'Jadaka and agreeing to look after Ramonda. He initially declines T'Challa's request to help fight N'Jadaka, but ultimately reconsiders and leads the Jabari into battle against him. Following N'Jadaka's death, M'Baku is granted a place on Wakanda's national council.

Later, in Avengers: Infinity War, he and the Jabari join the battle against Thanos's Outriders; M'Baku survives the Blip. In 2023, he joins the final battle against a past version of Thanos. In 2025, following T'Challa's and Ramonda's deaths, and respecting M'Baku's advice during the Talokan—Wakanda War, Shuri abdicates the Wakandan throne and allows M'Baku to challenge for it in her absence, leading him to become the new King of Wakanda.

As of 2026, the character has appeared in four projects: the films Black Panther (2018), Avengers: Infinity War, Avengers: Endgame, and Black Panther: Wakanda Forever (2022). He will return in the films Avengers: Doomsday (2026) and Black Panther III (2028).

=== Marge McCaffrey ===
Marge McCaffrey (portrayed by Lili Taylor) is the governor of New York. She is a key opponent of Mayor Wilson Fisk and his administration, but has a soft spot for Vanessa Fisk and Sheila Rivera. Later, Bullseye under the direction of Daredevil saves her from an assassination attempt.

As of 2026, the character has appeared in one project: the Disney+ series Daredevil: Born Again (2025–2027).

=== Hank McCoy / Beast ===
Dr. Henry "Hank" McCoy (portrayed by Kelsey Grammer), also known as Beast, is a mutant and a member of the X-Men from an alternate universe who possesses animalistic physical characteristics that include blue fur, pointy ears, fangs, and claws.

As of 2026, the character has appeared in one project: the film The Marvels (2023). He will return in the film Avengers: Doomsday. Grammer previously portrayed a different version of McCoy in 20th Century Fox's X-Men film series.

=== Kirsten McDuffie ===
Kirsten McDuffie (portrayed by Nikki M. James) is a former New York assistant district attorney who became Matt Murdock's partner and founded the law firm Murdock & McDuffie with him. During Wilson Fisk's tenure as the Mayor of New York City, McDuffie defends the vigilantes arrested by the Anti-Vigilante Task Force (AVTF), including Karen Page and Jack Duquesne.

As of 2026, the character has appeared in one project: the Disney+ series Daredevil: Born Again.

=== Mephisto ===
Mephisto (portrayed by Sacha Baron Cohen) is a powerful extra-dimensional demon who manipulates humans into forming pacts with him.

As of 2026, the character has appeared in one project: the Disney+ series Ironheart (2025).

=== Bill Metzger ===
William "Bill" Metzger (portrayed by Tramell Tillman) is the head of the Department of Damage Control (DODC) by 2028 who is policing superpowered individuals. Following a breakout at the DODC facility, Metzger enlists Spider-Man's help in dealing with an invisible threat that only he can sense and to which he is immune thanks to his powers. Upon discovering that the threat was the mutant Jean Grey, and with Spider-Man's help, Metzger subdued and imprisoned her at the Damage Control Detention Facility. Metzger and the DODC were conducting the same experiments they had on Jean's sister, Sara, and Jean's powers, fueled by rage, developed and overwhelmed Metzger and his subordinates. However, Spider-Man prevented Grey from killing Metzger in revenge, and Metzger disappeared after the conflict.

As of 2026, the character has appeared in one project: the film Spider-Man: Brand New Day (2026).

=== Proxima Midnight ===
Proxima Midnight (voiced and faced by Carrie Coon, motion-captured by Monique Ganderton) is Thanos' adopted daughter. She joined her father in his quest for the six Infinity Stones, initially attacked the Statesman with her brothers, helping to kill the Asgardians aboard to retrieve the Space Stone. While attempting to claim the Mind Stone, she and Corvus Glaive attack Wanda Maximoff and Vision, but are repelled by Steve Rogers, Sam Wilson, and Natasha Romanoff. During a second attempt at the Mind Stone, Proxima fights Romanoff and Okoye, but is ultimately killed by Maximoff. A past version of Midnight from 2014 travels through time with Thanos's forces to stop the Avengers from foiling his plans. However, they are all disintegrated when Tony Stark uses the Infinity Gauntlet.

As of 2026, the character has appeared in one project: the film Avengers: Infinity War. Alternate universe variants of Midnight appeared in two projects: the film Avengers: Endgame; and the Disney+ animated series What If...?.

=== Miek ===
Miek (motion-captured by Carly Rees and voiced by Stephen Murdoch) is a Sakaaran insectoid warrior. This version of the character is a larva-like creature as opposed to a humanoid roach like in the comic books, and initially uses an exoskeleton equipped with blades in combat. Having been freed from the Grandmaster's prison, Miek fights alongside Thor and Korg and joins the Asgardian people in their journey to Earth after the destruction of Asgard. Along with Korg, he survives Thanos's attack on the Asgardian starship and the Blip. He finds a new home with the Asgardians in New Asgard in Norway. Miek participates in the final battle at the destroyed Avengers Headquarters against Thanos and his army. Sometime later, Miek metamorphoses to a female form, and she organises tourism in New Asgard.

As of 2026, the character has appeared in three projects: the films Thor: Ragnarok (2017), Avengers: Endgame, and Thor: Love and Thunder (2022). Alternate universe variants of Miek appeared in one project: the Disney+ animated series What If...?.

=== Minn-Erva ===
Minn-Erva (portrayed by Gemma Chan) is a Kree sniper and member of Starforce who bears a strong animosity towards teammate Carol Danvers. After Danvers ends up on Earth, Minn-Erva accompanies Starforce to the planet to rescue her, where they discover a group of Skrull refugees and attempt to kill them. Having discovered the truth of the Kree's war with the Skrulls, Danvers fights off the rest of Starforce while Minn-Erva is shot down by Maria Rambeau.

As of 2026, the character has appeared in one project: the film Captain Marvel.

=== Nico Minoru ===
Nico Minoru (portrayed by Lyrica Okano) is a Wiccan and a member of the Runaways who isolates herself with her gothic appearance.

As of 2026, the character has appeared in one project: the Marvel Television series Runaways (2017–2019). An alternate universe variant of Nico appeared in two projects: the comic book series Your Friendly Neighborhood Spider-Man (2024–2025); and the Disney+ animated series Your Friendly Neighborhood Spider-Man (voiced by Grace Song). She will return in the comic book series Your Friendly Neighborhood Spider-Man Season 2.

=== Tina Minoru ===
Tina Minoru (initially portrayed by Linda Louise Duan and later by Brittany Ishibashi) is the mother of Nico Minoru and a member of the Pride.

As of 2026, the character has appeared in two projects: the film Doctor Strange (2016); and the Marvel Television series Runaways.

=== Mobius M. Mobius ===
Mobius M. Mobius (portrayed by Owen Wilson) is an agent of the Time Variance Authority specialized in the investigation of particularly dangerous "time variant" criminals. He befriends a 2012 variant of Loki. He travels through time and realities with Loki to find the variant Sylvie. While helping Loki to handle the time slipping, it's revealed that Mobius has been with the TVA for at least four hundred years, although he has undergone multiple memory wipes. In "Science/Fiction", Mobius is revealed to be a temporal variant of Don, a jet ski salesman from 2022 Cleveland who is also the single father of two sons, Kevin and Sean. In the season finale, Mobius enters Earth-616, the main universe, and observes his main counterpart at his house.

As of 2026, the character has appeared in four projects: the Disney+ series Loki (2021–2023); the films Ant-Man and the Wasp: Quantumania (2023) (post-credits cameo) and Avengers Endgame: Encore (2026); and the comic book series TVA (2024–2025).

=== Anton Mogart ===
Anton Mogart (portrayed by Gaspard Ulliel) is a wealthy antiquities collector living in Egypt and an old acquaintance of Layla El-Faouly. Marc Spector, Steven Grant, and El-Faouly meet with him to find the map to Ammit's tomb. He betrays them when Arthur Harrow arrives and is speared through the chest by Spector.

As of 2026, the character has appeared in one project: the Disney+ series Moon Knight (2022).

=== Lisa Molinari ===
Lisa Molinari (portrayed by Lauren Morais) is a pickpocket who is an accomplice of Tommy Maximoff / Thomas Shepherd.

As of 2026, the character has appeared in one project: the Disney+ series VisionQuest.

=== Karl Mordo ===
Karl Mordo (portrayed by Chiwetel Ejiofor) is a sorcerer and a former member of the Masters of the Mystic Arts. A close ally to the Ancient One, he assists in recruiting and training their future sorcerers. In this role, he trains Stephen Strange, using the Staff of the Living Tribunal as his weapon. He also helps Strange fight against Kaecilius. The Ancient One notes that Mordo's strength must be balanced by Strange since Mordo is unable to recognize the need for moral flexibility and compromise. In 2017, disillusioned with the teachings of the Ancient One after learning that the latter's immortality has been the result of her drawing on the energy of the Dark Dimension and Strange further breaking nature's laws, he decides to leave his fellow sorcerers. He comes to believe that all magic perverts and disrupts the natural order, thus causing him to set out to stop others from using it. Mordo later visits former Master Jonathan Pangborn and steals the energy that he uses to walk, stating that the world has "too many sorcerers".

In an alternate universe designated as Earth-838, Baron Karl Mordo is the Sorcerer Supreme and a member of the Illuminati, following the betrayal of his universe's Stephen Strange.

As of 2026, the character has appeared in one project: the film Doctor Strange. An alternate universe variant of Mordo appeared in one project: the film Doctor Strange in the Multiverse of Madness.

=== Karli Morgenthau ===
Karli Morgenthau (portrayed by Erin Kellyman) is the teenage leader of the anti-nationalist terrorist group the Flag Smashers, who were made Super Soldiers with the help of the Power Broker (Sharon Carter) and use violent tactics such as bombings to achieve open borders for refugees in the Baltic states. She is killed by Carter (to hide Carter's identity as the Power Broker) after she attempts to kill Carter and an oblivious Sam Wilson.

As of 2026, the character has appeared in one project: the Disney+ series The Falcon and the Winter Soldier (2021).

=== Jim Morita ===
James "Jim" Morita (portrayed by Kenneth Choi) is a Japanese American member of the Howling Commandos who fought in World War II. By 2016, one of Morita’s descendants (also portrayed by Choi) is the principal of the Midtown School of Science and Technology.

As of 2026, the character has appeared in two projects: the film Captain America: The First Avenger (2011); and the Marvel Television series Agents of S.H.I.E.L.D. (2013–2020). An alternate universe variant of Morita appeared in one project: the Disney+ animated series What If...?.

=== Ororo Munroe / Storm ===
Ororo Munroe (portrayed by Maya Boyd), also known as Storm, is a mutant who has the ability to manipulate the weather and atmosphere.

The character will be introduced in the untitled X-Men film, and is expected to appear in Black Panther III (both 2028). Alternate universe variants of Munroe (voiced by Alison Sealy-Smith), have appeared in the Disney+ animated series What If...?. Sealy-Smith previously voiced a different version of Storm in the animated series X-Men: The Animated Series (1992–1997) and X-Men '97 (2024–present).

== N ==
=== Najma ===
Najma (portrayed by Nimra Bucha) is Kamran's mother, and the leader of the Clandestines, who want to return to their home dimension at any cost necessary. In 1942, Najma discovered one of the bangles at a Ten Rings temple in India, and gave it to Aisha for safekeeping when was then attacked by the British Armed Forces. She found Aisha in an Indian village five years later, during the Partition of India, and asked Aisha to return the bangle and come with her so they could return home. When she realized Aisha had no intention of relinquishing the bangle or going back home with them, Najma stabbed Aisha and left her to die. In 2025, Najma sensed that Kamala Khan had Aisha's bangle and realized Aisha had started a family. In a fight with Khan, she ended up hitting the bangle and unintentionally opened a rift to the Noor Dimension. Najma was convinced by Khan not to abandon Kamran, and Najma chose to sacrifice herself to close the rift, although not before passing on some of the Noor from the rift on to her son.

As of 2026, the character has appeared in one project: the Disney+ series Ms. Marvel (2022).

=== Nakia ===
Nakia (portrayed by Lupita Nyong'o) is a former Dora Milaje, a member of the War Dogs, and T'Challa's lover. Having often been sent on missions around the world and witnessing the hardships experienced by many people, she grows in the belief that Wakanda should actively help them. Nakia returns to Wakanda upon hearing that T'Challa's father, T'Chaka, was killed. She stays after T'Challa is crowned king and asks that she accompany him to one of their missions. After N'Jadaka seizes the throne and orders the heart-shaped herbs which grant the power of the Black Panther to be burned, Nakia steals one. Although Ramonda urges Nakia to consume it to challenge N'Jadaka, Nakia plans to offer it to M'Baku so that he can challenge N'Jadaka with his army. M'Baku reveals that his people have recovered T'Challa, so Nakia gives the herb to T'Challa, healing him and restoring his powers as the Black Panther. Nakia then assists in the insurrection against N'Jadaka, dressing as a Dora Milaje soldier at Shuri's insistence. Following N'Jadaka's death, Nakia resumes her relationship with T'Challa and accepts a position running a Wakandan outreach center in California at the location of N'Jobu and N'Jadaka's former apartment. Sometime after, Nakia and T'Challa have a child, also named T'Challa, and decide to have him be raised away from the throne. After Thanos's attack on Wakanda and the ensuing Blip, Nakia leaves Wakanda and raises her child in Haiti.

As of 2026, the character has appeared in two projects: the films Black Panther and Black Panther: Wakanda Forever. An alternate universe variant of Nakia (voiced by Brittany Adebumola) appeared in one project: the Disney+ animated series What If...?.

=== Namor / K'uk'ulkan ===
Namor (portrayed by Tenoch Huerta Mejía as an adult and by Manuel Chavez as a child) is the king of Talokan, whose people refer to him as the feathered serpent god K'uk'ulkan. In 1571, his mother Fen ingested a vibranium-laced herb to gain immunity from smallpox while pregnant with her son. The effects of the herb caused her and the rest of Yucatán's people to develop blue skin and grow gills that restricted their ability to breathe air on the surface, thus forcing them to relocate underwater and establish Talokan as a new civilization. The herb additionally caused her son to undergo a mutation at birth, which gave him pointed ears, winged ankles enabling him to fly, and the ability to breathe oxygen and water simultaneously. Motivated by his hatred of the surface world, and a recent discovery of a vibranium detection device designed by Riri Williams in the ocean that put his nation at risk, he initially attempted to forge a military alliance with the nation of Wakanda to protect Talokan while supplying their people with his army due to its similarly isolationist nature in exchange for the custody of Williams, to which both Queen Ramonda and Princess Shuri decline. However, after a fight between the two nations, Shuri and Namor come to an alliance, and opt to help each other in the future.

As of 2026, the character has appeared in one project: the film Black Panther: Wakanda Forever. He will return in the film Avengers: Doomsday. An alternate universe variant of Namor appeared in one project: the Disney+ animated series Marvel Zombies (2025–present).

=== Namora ===
Namora (portrayed by Mabel Cadena) is a Talokanil warrior who is Namor's cousin and right-hand woman, whom Namora looks up to as a father figure.

As of 2026, the character has appeared in one project: the film Black Panther: Wakanda Forever. She will return in the film Avengers: Doomsday.

=== Elektra Natchios ===
As of 2026, Elektra Natchios (portrayed by Élodie Yung), an assassin and former lover of Matt Murdock, has appeared in two projects: the Marvel Television series Daredevil (2015–2018) and The Defenders (2017). She will return in the Disney+ series Daredevil: Born Again. An alternate universe variant of Natchios (portrayed by Jennifer Garner) appeared in one project: the film Deadpool & Wolverine (2024). Garner reprises her role from the 20th Century Fox films Daredevil (2003) and Elektra (2005).

=== Negasonic Teenage Warhead ===
Negasonic Teenage Warhead (portrayed by Brianna Hildebrand) is a teenage member of the X-Men from Earth-10005 who possesses the mutant power to detonate atomic bursts from her body.

As of 2026, the character has appeared in one project: the film Deadpool & Wolverine. Hildebrand reprises her role from 20th Century Fox's X-Men film series.

=== N'Jadaka / Erik "Killmonger" Stevens ===
N'Jadaka (portrayed by Michael B. Jordan), also known as Erik Stevens or Killmonger, is a former U.S. Navy SEAL lieutenant and the son of N'Jobu. His father was killed by T'Chaka for helping Ulysses Klaue smuggle vibranium out of Wakanda to arm oppressed peoples around the world and initiate revolutions. N'Jadaka later becomes an acquaintance of Klaue, before betraying and killing him to gain the trust of the Wakandan population. After bringing the dead Klaue, he challenges his cousin T'Challa to a duel over the throne, which N'Jadaka wins. However, T'Challa later returns to take back his throne, with the help of M'Baku, Okoye, and Shuri. T'Challa defeats N'Jadaka in combat and fatally wounds him, although he takes N'Jadaka to see the Wakandan sunset per his wishes. N'Jadaka dies after refusing to be healed, claiming that death is "better than bondage". Impacted by his cousin's death, T'Challa decides to finally open Wakanda up to the rest of the world. Following the deaths of T'Challa and his and Shuri's mother Ramonda, N'Jadaka's spirit meets with Shuri in the ancestral plane after she ingests a synthetic version of the heart-shaped herb, warning her of how close her desire for vengeance upon Namor is bringing her to being like him, with Shuri then assuming a Black Panther suit inspired by N'Jadaka's.

The character has been widely praised as one of the MCU's best villains, with Ben Child of The Guardian comparing the character to both the Terminator and Darth Vader.

As of 2026, the character has appeared in three projects: the films Black Panther and Black Panther: Wakanda Forever; and the Disney+ animated series Eyes of Wakanda (2025) (non-speaking cameo). An alternate universe variant of Killmonger appeared in one project: the Disney+ animated series What If...?.

=== N'Jobu ===
N'Jobu (portrayed by Sterling K. Brown) is the younger brother of T'Chaka and an agent of Wakanda's War Dogs. After betraying his own people and aiding Ulysses Klaue with getting vibranium out of Wakanda with the intention of allowing oppressed people to possess its power, N'Jobu is confronted and killed by T'Chaka. N'Jobu's only son, N'Jadaka, eventually discovers what happened and plans to avenge his death and complete his work by becoming king of Wakanda.

As of 2026, the character has appeared in one project: the film Black Panther.

=== Nkati / The Lion ===
Nkati (voiced by Cress Williams), also known as The Lion, is a former Wakandan general turned warlord and pirate in the 13th century BC. By 1260 BC, he had managed to use the advanced technology he stole from the country to found his own tyrannical kingdom.

As of 2026, the character has appeared in one project: the Disney+ animated series Eyes of Wakanda.

=== Jackson Norriss ===
Jackson Norriss (portrayed by Scoot McNairy) is a member of the Ten Rings who was ordered by Xu Wenwu to bring Trevor Slattery to him, so he could be punished for mocking his persona. Norriss disguised himself as a documentary filmmaker and interviewed Slattery at the Seagate Prison, before revealing himself and abducting Slattery.

As of 2026, the character has appeared in one project: the Marvel One-Shot All Hail the King (2014).

=== Cole North ===
Cole North (portrayed by Jeremy Isaiah Earl) is a New York Police Department (NYPD) sergeant transferred from Chicago who becomes a member of Wilson Fisk's Anti-Vigilante Task Force (AVTF). After his murder of Hector Ayala, he's involved in an explosion at Matt Murdock's apartment after fighting Daredevil and The Punisher. After realizing he was given false intel to kill Ayala, North turns on Connor Powell and Fisk to help the resistance against Fisk. He is later arrested for his acts as a part of the AVTF.

As of 2026, the character has appeared in one project: the Disney+ series Daredevil: Born Again.

=== Cassandra Nova ===
Cassandra Nova (portrayed by Emma Corrin) is a mutant with telekinetic and telepathic powers who is the twin sister of Charles Xavier. She was banished to the Void by the Time Variance Authority.

As of 2026, the character has appeared in one project: the film Deadpool & Wolverine.

== O ==
=== Kraglin Obfonteri ===
Kraglin Obfonteri (portrayed by Sean Gunn) is a Xandarian and the first mate of Yondu Udonta's faction of the Ravagers. In 2014, following the mutiny of the other Ravagers, Kraglin remains loyal to Yondu and helps rescue the Guardians of the Galaxy from Ego. After Yondu's death, Kraglin inherits his Yaka arrow and acquires a similar cybernetic fin. In 2023, he is transported to Earth to join the Avengers and other heroes in the battle against a past version of Thanos. He later joins the Guardians as an official member.

As of 2026, the character has appeared in six projects: the films Guardians of the Galaxy (2014), Guardians of the Galaxy Vol. 2, Avengers: Endgame (cameo), Thor: Love and Thunder, and Guardians of the Galaxy Vol. 3; and the Disney+ special The Guardians of the Galaxy Holiday Special (2022). An alternate universe variant of Kraglin appeared in one project: the Disney+ animated series What If...?.

=== Cull Obsidian ===
Cull Obsidian (voiced and portrayed via motion capture by Terry Notary) is an adopted son of Thanos equipped with a chain hammer and an arm blade. In 2018, he and Ebony Maw go to Earth to retrieve the Time Stone. They arrive in New York City and find themselves confronted by Stephen Strange, Wong, Tony Stark, and later Peter Parker. In the ensuing fight, Obsidian is tricked by Wong into jumping through a portal into Antarctica, severing his hand in the process. He is rescued by Proxima Midnight and Corvus Glaive, and his hand is replaced by a cybernetic replacement. He then partakes in the battle in Wakanda, killing many people and knocking James Rhodes out of the sky. Later, Obsidian attacks Vision and is confronted by Bruce Banner, who defeats him in the Hulkbuster armor by sending him flying into the Wakandan energy shield, incinerating Obsidian on impact.

An alternate version of Cull Obsidian from 2014 arrives with an alternate Thanos and his army into the main universe. During the battle, he is stepped on and killed by Scott Lang.

As of 2026, the character has appeared in one project: the film Avengers: Infinity War. Alternate universe variants of Obsidian appeared in two projects: the film Avengers: Endgame; and the Disney+ animated series What If...?.

=== Otto Octavius / Doctor Octopus ===
As of 2026, alternate universe variants of Otto Octavius, a former Oscorp scientist with four mechanical tentacles fused to his back who became a criminal known as Doctor Octopus, have appeared in two projects: the film Spider-Man: No Way Home (portrayed by Alfred Molina); and the Disney+ animated series Your Friendly Neighborhood Spider-Man (voiced by Hugh Dancy). Molina reprises his role from Sam Raimi's Spider-Man film series.

=== Stakar Ogord ===
Stakar Ogord (portrayed by Sylvester Stallone) is a legendary Ravager captain and the leader of the Stakar Ravager Clan. Ogord saved Yondu Udonta from a life of slavery to the Kree and welcomed him to the Ravagers, but was later forced to exile him for engaging in child trafficking, a violation of the Ravager code. Ogord joins the other Ravager clans at honoring Yondu during his funeral after his sacrifice to save Peter Quill. In a mid-credits scene, Stakar and Martinex reunite with their old teammates Charlie-27, Aleta Ogord, Mainframe, and Krugarr. He later aids the Guardians in their infiltration of the Orgoscope space station during their search of a passkey to disable the kill switch in Rocket's heart and save his life.

As of 2026, the character has appeared in two projects: the films Guardians of the Galaxy Vol. 2 and Guardians of the Galaxy Vol. 3.

=== Okoye ===
Okoye (portrayed by Danai Gurira) is a Wakandan warrior and the former general of the Dora Milaje. In 2016, she fights on T'Challa's side when N'Jadaka plots to usurp the throne. In 2018, she fights alongside members of the Avengers to combat Thanos and his army during the battle in Wakanda. She survives the Blip and helps the remaining Avengers for the next five years. In 2023, she participates in the battle against an alternate version of Thanos and his army. In 2024, she attends T'Challa's funeral. In 2025, she and Shuri go to Cambridge, Massachusetts to meet an MIT student, Riri Williams, who built a vibranium-detecting machine and plans to take her to Wakanda. Later, she was removed from her post as a General as she could not protect Shuri and Riri who were kidnapped by Namor. Later Shuri bestows her with the Midnight Angel Armor, recruiting her and Aneka to fight alongside the rest of the Wakandan military forces against Namor and his Talokan army. Okoye then continues to support Wakanda from overseas, breaking Everett Ross out of a prison transport.

As of 2026, the character has appeared in four projects: the films Black Panther, Avengers: Infinity War, Avengers: Endgame, and Black Panther: Wakanda Forever. Alternate universe variants of Okoye appeared in two projects: the Disney+ animated series What If...? (voiced by Gurira in the first season and Kenna Ramsey in the third season) and Marvel Zombies (voiced by Ramsey).

=== Harry Osborn ===
Harold "Harry" Osborn (voiced by Zeno Robinson) is an influencer and the son of Norman Osborn in an alternate universe. He befriends Peter Parker and provides him support as Spider-Man's "dude at the desk". Harry later founds his own company, the Worldwide Engineering Brigade (W.E.B.), to support young geniuses without exploiting them.

As of 2026, the character has appeared in one project: the Disney+ animated series Your Friendly Neighborhood Spider-Man.

=== Norman Osborn / Green Goblin ===
As of 2026, alternate universe variants of Norman Osborn, a scientist and the CEO of Oscorp with an insane split personality known as the Green Goblin who uses advanced armor and equipment, have appeared in two projects: the film Spider-Man: No Way Home (portrayed by Willem Dafoe); and the Disney+ animated series Your Friendly Neighborhood Spider-Man (voiced by Colman Domingo). Dafoe reprises his role from Sam Raimi's Spider-Man film series.

=== The Other ===
The Other (portrayed by Alexis Denisof) is a character from the MCU and the grim leader of an alien race called the Chitauri. He is a servant of Thanos and uses telepathic powers. In 2014, he is killed by Ronan the Accuser.

As of 2026, the character has appeared in two projects: the films The Avengers (2012) and Guardians of the Galaxy.

=== Ouroboros "O.B." ===
Ouroboros "O.B." (portrayed by Ke Huy Quan), is the chief engineer of the Time Variance Authority, who deals with the maintenance and repair of all the complex tools, including time travel devices. In "Science/Fiction," O.B. is revealed to be a temporal variant of Dr. A.D. Doug, PhD, a failed science fiction author and theoretical physics teacher at Caltech in 1994 who would rather focus on his writing than on science.

As of 2026, the character has appeared in three projects: the Disney+ series Loki; the comic book series TVA; and the film Avengers Endgame: Encore.

== P ==
=== Christine Palmer ===
Dr. Christine Palmer (portrayed by Rachel McAdams) is an emergency surgeon who is a colleague and former lover of Stephen Strange. She saves his life after he is nearly killed by Kaecilius. After surviving the Blip, she ends up marrying her boyfriend Charlie, who is also a big fan of Stephen Strange.

In the alternate universe designated as Earth-838, Palmer works for the Baxter Foundation to analyze multiversal threats.

As of 2026, the character has appeared in two projects: the films Doctor Strange and Doctor Strange in the Multiverse of Madness. Alternate universe variants of Palmer appeared in two projects: the Disney+ animated series What If...?; and the film Doctor Strange in the Multiverse of Madness.

=== Pearl Pangan ===
Pearl Pangan (voiced by Cathy Ang) is the childhood crush and later classmate of Peter Parker at Rockford T. Bales High School in an alternate universe.

As of 2026, the character has appeared in two projects: the comic book series Your Friendly Neighborhood Spider-Man; and the Disney+ animated series Your Friendly Neighborhood Spider-Man.

=== Jonathan Pangborn ===
Jonathan Pangborn (portrayed by Benjamin Bratt) is a former Master of the Mystic Arts who was trained by the Ancient One but later chose to leave Kamar-Taj as he only wanted to heal his paralysis. Karl Mordo later drains him of his magic and his ability to walk, as Mordo claims that there are too many sorcerers.

As of 2026, the character has appeared in one project: the film Doctor Strange.

=== Mr. Paradox ===
Mr. Paradox (portrayed by Matthew Macfadyen) is a Time Variance Authority (TVA) agent who oversees an unsanctioned project to speed up the death of the Earth-10005 universe by using the "Time Ripper", a machine which can hasten the end of timelines. Paradox dislikes the method TVA imposes on dying timelines, viewing his Time Ripper as an act of mercy killing, and hopes to prove himself with this act to become the leader of the TVA. After Deadpool and Wolverine destroy the Time Ripper, which also kills Cassandra Nova, Paradox is arrested by his superior Hunter B-15.

As of 2026, the character has appeared in one project: the film Deadpool & Wolverine.

=== May Parker ===
May Parker (portrayed by Marisa Tomei) is Peter Parker's aunt and Ben Parker's widow. She discovers that Peter is Spider-Man, unlike previous cinematic iterations, when she enters the room and sees him in the suit. She was one of the victims of the Blip in 2018, but she is brought back to life and shows up at Tony Stark's funeral in 2023. Following that, she starts dating Happy Hogan. When villains from different universes arrive in hers, May temporarily houses Norman Osborn at the F.E.A.S.T. shelter where she works before assisting Peter in bringing the remaining displaced villains to Hogan's apartment so they can be treated. May is fatally wounded by an inflicted stab wound from being impaled by Osborn's glider when Osborn's alternate personality, the Green Goblin takes control, persuades most of the other villains to reject their cures and stages an uprising inside Hogan's apartment. She gives the grieving Peter her parting advice, "With great power, there must also come great responsibility", before dying.

As of 2026, the character has appeared in six projects: the films Captain America: Civil War (2016), Spider-Man: Homecoming, Avengers: Endgame (cameo), Spider-Man: Far From Home (2019), Spider-Man: No Way Home, and Spider-Man: Brand New Day. An alternate universe variant of May appeared in two projects: the comic book series Your Friendly Neighborhood Spider-Man; and the Disney+ animated series Your Friendly Neighborhood Spider-Man (voiced by Kari Wahlgren).

=== Eugene Patilio / Leap-Frog ===
Eugene Patilio (portrayed by Brandon Stanley), also known as Leap-Frog, is the son of a rich GLK&H client who tries to become a crime fighter in a frog-themed costume.

As of 2026, the character has appeared in one project: the Disney+ series She-Hulk: Attorney at Law.

=== Vincent Patilio ===
Vincent Patilio (voiced by Kellen Goff) is Otto Octavius's assistant in an alternate universe.

As of 2026, the character has appeared in one project: the Disney+ animated series Your Friendly Neighborhood Spider-Man.

=== Phastos ===
Phastos (portrayed by Brian Tyree Henry) is an Eternal and an intelligent cosmic-powered inventor who helps humanity progress technologically behind the scenes before abandoning them to live in exile following the bombing of Hiroshima. By 2024, he lives under the human alias of "Phil" with a husband named Ben (portrayed by Haaz Sleiman) and their 10-year-old son Jack (portrayed by Esai Daniel Cross).

As of 2026, the character has appeared in one project: the film Eternals.

=== Todd Phelps / HulkKing ===
Todd Phelps (portrayed by Jon Bass), also known by his online username "HulkKing", is a billionaire and the founder and leader of Intelligencia. He made plans to obtain She-Hulk's DNA through different minions. During the confrontation at a seminar hosted by Abomination, Phelps injected himself with the DNA and became a Hulk as Titania and Hulk also showed up. The transformation was undone when She-Hulk filed a complaint about it and her cousin's unexplained appearance to K.E.V.I.N. Todd and those involved are arrested as She-Hulk plans to see Todd in court.

As of 2026, the character has appeared in one project: the Disney+ series She-Hulk: Attorney at Law.

=== Chester Phillips ===
Colonel Chester Phillips (portrayed by Tommy Lee Jones) is one of the founders of S.H.I.E.L.D., along with Peggy Carter and Howard Stark. He leads the Strategic Scientific Reserve during World War II and is initially skeptical of Abraham Erskine's choice to administer the Super Soldier Serum to Steve Rogers, but later has a change of heart after witnessing Rogers's heroic actions.

As of 2026, the character has appeared in one project: the film Captain America: The First Avenger. An alternate universe variant of Phillips appeared in one project: the Disney+ animated series What If...?.

=== Phyla ===
Phyla (portrayed by Kai Zen) is a Star Child, a species genetically engineered by the High Evolutionary. Phyla met the Guardians of the Galaxy and escaped her imprisonment, joining the new lineup of the Guardians, led by Rocket Raccoon.

As of 2026, the character has appeared in one project: the film Guardians of the Galaxy Vol. 3.

=== Alexander Pierce ===
Alexander Pierce (portrayed by Robert Redford) is the secretary of the World Security Council and the secret director of Hydra operating within S.H.I.E.L.D. He plans on using Project Insight to eliminate individuals that would oppose or threaten Hydra goals, those who are recognized as a threat to Hydra based on Arnim Zola's algorithm. When Pierce learns that Nick Fury is investigating Project Insight's confidential files, he dispatches the Winter Soldier to eliminate him and Steve Rogers. However, Pierce's plan is foiled by Rogers, Natasha Romanoff, Sam Wilson, and S.H.I.E.L.D. loyalists before Pierce is killed by Fury.

In 2023, the Avengers time travel to 2012, where Pierce attempts to take custody of Loki and the Tesseract away from Tony Stark and Thor following the Battle of New York.

As of 2026, the character has appeared in one project: the film Captain America: The Winter Soldier. Alternate universe variants of Pierce appeared in two projects: the film Avengers: Endgame; and the Disney+ animated series What If...? (non-speaking cameo).

=== Pip the Troll ===
Pip the Troll (voiced by Patton Oswalt) is an ally and friend of Eros.

As of 2026, the character has appeared in one project: the film Eternals (mid-credits cameo).

=== Cherry Pitts ===
Clark "Cherry" Pitts (portrayed by Clark Johnson) is a retired New York Police Department (NYPD) officer who works as an investigator at the Murdock & McDuffie law firm and is aware of Matt Murdock's secret identity as the vigilante Daredevil. He is later hospitalized by the Anti-Vigilante Task Force (AVTF) but returns to help Murdock, McDuffie, and Brett Mahoney in their defense of Karen Page, where he also meets fellow private investigator Jessica Jones.

As of 2026, the character has appeared in one project: the Disney+ series Daredevil: Born Again.

=== Benjamin "Dex" Poindexter / Bullseye ===
As of 2026, Benjamin "Dex" Poindexter (portrayed by Wilson Bethel), a psychopathic assassin and former FBI agent known as Bullseye who is a highly skilled marksman capable of using almost any object as a lethal projectile, has appeared in two projects: the Marvel Television series Daredevil; and the Disney+ series Daredevil: Born Again. An alternate universe variant of Bullseye (portrayed by Curtis Small) appeared in one project: the film Deadpool & Wolverine.

=== Connor Powell ===
Connor Powell (portrayed by Hamish Allan-Headley) is a corrupt New York Police Department (NYPD) officer who becomes a member of Mayor Wilson Fisk's Anti-Vigilante Task Force (AVTF), working very closely with the Mayor and his administration. He frequently spars with vigilantes such as Daredevil, the Punisher, and Jessica Jones during their resistance against the AVTF. He most notably arrests Karen Page during the protests at City Hall. After the trial of Page, Powell is turned on by Cole North and arrested for his acts in Fisk’s administration.

As of 2026, the character has appeared in one project: the Disney+ series Daredevil: Born Again.

=== Augustus "Pug" Pugliese ===
Augustus "Pug" Pugliese (portrayed by Josh Segarra), is a member of the legal team at GLK&H, who works with Jennifer Walters and Nikki Ramos and is a loyal friend of theirs. He helps Walters in uncovering the mastermind behind the criminal organization, Intelligencia.

As of 2026, the character has appeared in one project: the Disney+ series She-Hulk: Attorney at Law.

=== Hank Pym / Ant-Man ===
Dr. Henry "Hank" Pym (portrayed by Michael Douglas) is an entomologist and quantum physicist who created the formula for the Pym Particle, a subatomic particle that changes the distance between atoms, allowing one to shrink and grow in relative size, while increasing strength. Hank Pym is the MCU's original Ant-Man, a role begun in 1963, during his tenure as a high-ranking scientist and operative at S.H.I.E.L.D.

As the Ant-Man, Hank Pym operated as a classified agent performing field missions on behalf of S.H.I.E.L.D., using a self-designed shrinking suit powered by Pym particles that also gave him the ability to communicate with different species of ants by producing electromagnetic waves that stimulate the olfactory nerve centers of the ants. During one of these classified missions in 1987, his wife Janet van Dyne was lost within the Quantum Realm and presumed dead. Following the incident, Pym resigns from S.H.I.E.L.D. in 1989, after he suspects Howard Stark of attempting to replicate the Pym particle formula. Pym retires the Ant-Man suit and founds his own technology company in San Francisco. In 2015, after Darren Cross' takeover of the company, Pym subsequently recruits Scott Lang to take on the mantle of Ant-Man, with the assistance of his estranged daughter Hope van Dyne. Together, they prevent Cross from selling the Yellowjacket technology to Hydra. In 2016, Pym inadvertently violates the Sokovia Accords because of Lang's misuse of his technology, and becomes a fugitive along with Hope from the FBI. In 2018, with help from Lang and Hope, he subsequently succeeds in rescuing Janet from the Quantum Realm. However, shortly after, Pym, along with Janet and Hope, becomes a victim of the Blip. In 2023, Pym is restored to life and attends Tony Stark's funeral with Janet, Hope, and Lang. In 2026, he, Janet, Hope, Lang, and Cassie Lang are accidentally transported to the Quantum Realm where they encounter and seemingly defeat and prevent Kang the Conqueror from escaping into the multiverse.

In an alternate universe, Pym is working at Camp Lehigh, when vials of Pym particles are stolen from him by Steve Rogers. In another alternate universe, Pym dresses in the Yellowjacket armor and murders prospective Avengers Tony Stark, Thor, Clint Barton, Bruce Banner, and Natasha Romanoff as revenge on Nick Fury for Hope's death. He is eventually arrested and taken to Asgard by Loki for killing Thor. In another alternate universe, Pym ventures into the Quantum Realm and is infected by Janet with a zombie virus that is subsequently spread across Earth when they return. Later in the battle for "Infinity Hulk", the zombified Pym is defeated by Peter Parker and Scott Lang, and sliced in half by Blade Knight. In another alternate universe, Pym, still serving as Ant-Man, is recruited by Howard Stark and Peggy Carter in 1988 to join a response team to address the threat posed by Ego and his son Peter Quill. Sympathizing with him over his loss of his mother, Pym manages to speak with Quill and aids him in defeating Ego, before adopting him.

As of 2026, the character has appeared in four projects: the films Ant-Man (2015), Ant-Man and the Wasp (2018), Avengers: Endgame, and Ant-Man and the Wasp: Quantumania. Alternate universe variants of Pym appeared in three projects: the film Avengers: Endgame; and the Disney+ animated series What If...? and Marvel Zombies.

== Q ==
=== Peter Quill / Star-Lord ===
==== Quill family ====
Meredith Quill (portrayed by Laura Haddock) is the mother of Peter Quill and the ex-lover of Ego. She meets Ego, falls in love with him, and becomes pregnant with their son. She enjoys pop music, and gives Peter her walkman, along with her mixtapes. She later dies of brain cancer, unaware that the tumor was caused by Ego. Jason Quill (portrayed by Gregg Henry) is the father of Meredith and grandfather of Peter.

As of 2026, these characters have appeared in three projects: the films Guardians of the Galaxy, Guardians of the Galaxy Vol. 2, and Guardians of the Galaxy Vol. 3.

== R ==
=== Irani Rael / Nova Prime ===
Irani Rael (portrayed by Glenn Close), also known as the Nova Prime, is the leader of the Nova Corps. In 2014, she leads the Corps to victory with the help of the Guardians of the Galaxy when Ronan the Accuser attempts to destroy her home planet of Xandar with the Power Stone.

An alternate version of Rael appeared in the Disney+ animated series What If...? where she rescued Nebula following Ronan the Accuser's betrayal and murder of Thanos and Gamora. However, Rael betrayed Xandar to make a deal with Ronan, only to be defeated by Nebula, falling to her death following a failed attempt to kill Nebula and escape.

As of 2026, the character has appeared in one project: the film Guardians of the Galaxy. An alternate universe variant of Rael (voiced by Julianne Grossman) appeared in one project: the Disney+ animated series What If...?.

=== Ralph ===
Ralph (portrayed by James Dryden) is an employee of the Time Variance Authority (TVA).

As of 2026, the character has appeared in two projects: the films Deadpool & Wolverine and Avengers Endgame: Encore.

=== Maria Rambeau ===
Captain Maria Rambeau (portrayed by Lashana Lynch) is a former United States Air Force pilot and a single mother of Monica Rambeau. She becomes Carol Danvers's best friend, who is presumed dead for six years after a plane accident. Maria is reunited with Danvers during the Kree-Skrull War and helps Danvers to remember her early life. Later, she helps found S.W.O.R.D. and becomes its director until she dies of cancer in 2020.

In the alternate universe designated as Earth-838, Maria takes up the mantle of Captain Marvel instead of Danvers, serving as a member of the Illuminati until she is killed by Wanda Maximoff who dropped a statue on her after having her powers absorbed.

In another alternate universe, she adopted the mantle of Binary after gaining superhuman powers, becoming an ally to the mutant strike force known as the X-Men. She meets Monica Rambeau, whom she never parented in her reality, as the X-Men member Hank McCoy / Beast recovers her following her displacement into their world, due to an averted incursion between it and Earth-616.

As of 2026, the character has appeared in two projects: the films Captain Marvel and The Marvels. Alternate universe variants of Maria appeared in two projects: the films Doctor Strange in the Multiverse of Madness and The Marvels.

=== Monica Rambeau ===
Captain Monica Rambeau (portrayed by Akira Akbar as a child and by Teyonah Parris as an adult) is the daughter of Maria Rambeau. As a child in 1995, she is inspired by Carol Danvers and thinks highly of her. She also meets a family of Skrulls, as well as the Flerken, Goose. She grows up to become an agent of S.W.O.R.D., which was founded by her mother.

In 2018, she is a victim of the Blip. In 2023, she is restored to life and learns that her mother died three years earlier. She returns to work at S.W.O.R.D. and is tasked with investigating a missing-persons case in Westview, New Jersey. Upon arriving, she is sucked into Wanda Maximoff's alternate reality (the "Hex"), and remains there under the alias Geraldine. However, when she remembers the real reality, she is promptly forced out by Maximoff. Outside, she continues to help S.W.O.R.D with the Westview investigation, but after she defends Maximoff several times, S.W.O.R.D's acting director Tyler Hayward kicks her off the investigation. She, Darcy Lewis, and Jimmy Woo go rogue, and only she and Woo escape Maximoff's Hex expansion. After re-entering the Hex, her cells are rewritten and she gains superpowers, allowing her to absorb bullets and Maximoff's energy blasts. She then witnesses Maximoff fighting against Agatha Harkness and claiming the mantle as the fabled Scarlet Witch. After the Hex is taken down, she befriends Maximoff and wishes her well when Maximoff leaves Westview. She then gets notified by a Skrull that a friend of her mother is seeking her out.

Rambeau goes to the S.A.B.E.R. space station and works with Fury. In 2026, she is sent to investigate a jump point anomaly and learns that Danvers is investigating another one. When she touches it, she gets transported to a barren planet and is attacked by Kree soldiers. She gets transported back to the station and she and Fury return to Earth to Jersey City to meet Kamala Khan at her parents' house. Rambeau is reunited with Danvers there and explains how she got powers before having to rescue Khan from the sky. Eventually, she and Khan are transported to Tarnax IV, where a group of Skrulls live. When Danvers arrives, they are attacked by Dar-Benn and help the Skrulls onto Danvers's spaceship. Rambeau speaks with Danvers on the ship and the three try to work out their entanglement. They go to Aladna and meet the Prince, who is married to Danvers. Rambeau fights against Dar-Benn when she arrives and helps pilot the ship as they leave. On another planet, she and Danvers have a heartfelt conversation and return to the S.A.B.E.R. Space station to evacuate Fury and the agents. They then fight Dar-Benn again on her ship, in which she acquires both Quantum bands and tears a hole in the universe. Rambeau, powered up by Khan and Danvers, flies into the other universe and closes the tear before passing out. She awakes in the X-Mansion and meets Binary, an alternate version of her mother, and Beast.

As of 2026, the character has appeared in three projects: the films Captain Marvel and The Marvels; and the Disney+ series WandaVision. An alternate universe variant of Rambeau appeared in one project: the Disney+ animated series What If...?.

=== Ramonda ===
Ramonda (portrayed by Angela Bassett) is the Queen-Mother of Wakanda, wife of T'Chaka, and mother of T'Challa and Shuri. She stands by her son's side as queen mother when he becomes King of Wakanda, but is soon forced into exile when N'Jadaka seemingly-defeats T'Challa in ritual combat and seizes the throne. In 2018, she becomes the Queen regnant of Wakanda after the Blip, and in 2023, she reunites with her children after they are restored to life. In 2024, her son dies of an illness and Ramonda is reinstated as queen regnant of Wakanda. In 2025, Wakanda is attacked by the nation of Talokan, their leader Namor floods the throne room of the palace, and Ramonda drowns after saving Riri Williams from the water.

As of 2026, the character has appeared in three projects: the films Black Panther, Avengers: Endgame (cameo), and Black Panther: Wakanda Forever. An alternate universe variant of Ramonda appeared in one project: the Disney+ animated series What If...?.

=== Nikki Ramos ===
Nikki Ramos (portrayed by Ginger Gonzaga) is a paralegal working at GLK&H and the best friend of Jennifer Walters.

As of 2026, the character has appeared in one project: the Disney+ series She-Hulk: Attorney at Law.

=== Piotr Rasputin / Colossus ===
Piotr Rasputin (voiced by Stefan Kapičić), also known as Colossus, is a member of the X-Men from Earth-10005 who has the mutant ability to transform his body into organic steel.

As of 2026, the character has appeared in one project: the film Deadpool & Wolverine. Kapičić reprises his role from 20th Century Fox's X-Men film series.

=== Razor Fist ===
Razor Fist (portrayed by Florian Munteanu) is a high-ranking Ten Rings agent with a steel blade for a hand. He is sent by Wenwu to take Shang-Chi's pendant. Then he engages Shang-Chi when the Ten Rings target Xialing's pendant until Wenwu breaks up the resulting conflict. Razor Fist later accompanies him and Ten Rings on the assault on Ta Lo. When the Dweller-in-Darkness escapes his seal, Razor Fist orders the Ten Rings into working with the Ta Lo villagers to help battle the Dweller and his minions as he replaces his blade with one made of dragon scales. When Xialing takes over the Ten Rings and restructures it, Razor Fist retains his old position.

As of 2026, the character has appeared in one project: the film Shang-Chi and the Legend of the Ten Rings (2021).

=== Ravonna Renslayer ===
Judge Ravonna Renslayer (portrayed by Gugu Mbatha-Raw) is a former Minuteman for the Time Variance Authority (TVA) codenamed Hunter A-23 who rose from the ranks to become a respected judge. She oversees the Loki "variant" investigation. Prior to joining the TVA, she was a vice-principal called Rebecca Tourminet in Fremont, Ohio.

As of 2026, the character has appeared in one project: the Disney+ series Loki.

=== Bob Reynolds / Sentry / Void ===
Robert Reynolds (portrayed by Lewis Pullman), also known as Sentry, is a superpowered individual suffering from amnesia who is believed to be stronger than all of the Avengers combined. He gained his powers from Valentina Allegra de Fontaine and the O.X.E. Group after volunteering for their experimentation due to having developed a drug addiction. Initially intending for him to replace the Avengers, his poor mental health leads him to develop an alter ego known as the Void, causing everything to start being absorbed into a growing darkness until the Thunderbolts talk him down and help him regain control.

As of 2026, the character has appeared in one project: the film Thunderbolts* (2025). He will return in the film Avengers: Doomsday.

=== Franklin Richards ===
Franklin Richards (portrayed by Ada Scott) is the superpowered newborn son of Reed Richards and Sue Storm.

As of 2026, the character has appeared in one project: the film The Fantastic Four: First Steps (2025).

=== Reed Richards / Mister Fantastic ===
Dr. Reed Richards (portrayed by Pedro Pascal), also known as Mister Fantastic, is a highly intelligent scientist and the leader of the Fantastic Four who can stretch any part of his body to great lengths.

On Earth-838, Reed (portrayed by John Krasinski) is a member of the Fantastic Four and the Illuminati, having been dubbed "the smartest man alive" by his peers. The Illuminati seek to pass judgment on Earth-616's Stephen Strange and America Chavez for their roles in the possible destruction of the multiverse. However, Reed is killed by Wanda Maximoff via shredding after Maximoff muses that someone will be left alive to raise his children.

As of 2026, the character has appeared in three projects: the one-shot comics Fantastic Four: First Steps (2025) and Fantastic Four: First Foes (2026); and the film The Fantastic Four: First Steps. He will return in the films Avengers: Doomsday and Avengers: Secret Wars (2027). An alternate universe variant of Reed appeared in one project: the film Doctor Strange in the Multiverse of Madness.

=== Rintrah ===
Rintrah (voiced by Adam Hugill) is a minotaur-like being from R'Vaal who is a student at Kamar-Taj.

As of 2026, the character has appeared in one project: the film Doctor Strange in the Multiverse of Madness. An alternate universe variant of Rintrah appeared in one project: the Disney+ animated series Marvel Zombies.

=== William Ginter Riva ===
William Ginter Riva (portrayed by Peter Billingsley) is a former Stark Industries employee who is ordered by Obadiah Stane to replicate Tony Stark's arc reactor. Years later, in 2024, he joins Quentin Beck's crew to wreak havoc across Europe, helping him masquerade as a superhero named Mysterio, and controlling his drones. Following Mysterio's death, he leaks the identity of Spider-Man to J. Jonah Jameson, and uploads a copy of Mysterio's software onto a flash drive.

As of 2026, the character has appeared in two projects: the films Iron Man (2008) and Spider-Man: Far From Home.

=== Sheila Rivera ===
Sheila Rivera (portrayed by Zabryna Guevara) is Wilson Fisk's mayoral campaign director who also works on his staff during his tenure as mayor of New York City, and becomes the interim mayor after his banishment.

As of 2026, the character has appeared in two projects: the Disney+ series Daredevil: Born Again; and the film Spider-Man: Brand New Day.

=== Parker Robbins / The Hood ===
Parker Robbins (portrayed by Anthony Ramos), also known as The Hood, is a Chicago criminal and gang leader who dons a cloak that allows him to tap into dark arts and magic.

In an alternate universe set in the 1870s, Robbins was the leader of a criminal organization that kidnapped and enslaved Chinese immigrants in America before being killed by Xu Xialing, who took control of his organization.

As of 2026, the character has appeared in one project: the Disney+ series Ironheart. An alternate universe variant of Robbins appeared in one project: the Disney+ animated series What If...?.

=== Jack Rollins ===
Jack Rollins (portrayed by Callan Mulvey) is a S.H.I.E.L.D. agent secretly working for Hydra. In 2014, he was a member of the S.T.R.I.K.E. team and served as Rumlow's second-in-command and later revealed as one of the sleeper Hydra agent, participating in the uprising. In 2023, the Avengers time travel to 2012, where Rollins and Hydra agents attempt to obtain Loki's scepter, but are tricked by the present time Rogers into giving it to him instead.

As of 2026, the character has appeared in one project: the film Captain America: The Winter Soldier. Alternate universe variants of Rollins appeared in two projects: the film Avengers: Endgame; and the Disney+ animated series What If...?.

=== Ronan the Accuser ===
Ronan the Accuser (portrayed by Lee Pace) is a Kree fanatic whose family was killed in the Kree-Nova War. In the 1990s, Ronan actively leads the Accusers in the Kree-Skrull war. Working together with the Kree Starforce, he attempts to launch a missile strike on Earth to eliminate the Skrulls present on the planet, but is thwarted and chased off by Carol Danvers. In 2014, Ronan is hired by Thanos to acquire the Power Stone, with the assistance of Nebula, daughter of Thanos. However, Ronan's quest for vengeance and power causes him to break allegiance with Thanos and he decides to use the stone himself to serve his own agenda. Ultimately that decision leads him to a battle with the Guardians of the Galaxy ending in his own death when the Guardians use the Power Stone to vaporize Ronan.

An alternate version of Ronan appears in the Disney+ animated series What If...? where he betrays and killed Thanos and Gamora before laying siege to Xandar which is sealed off with an impenetrable planetary shield. Five years later, Irani Rael made a deal with Ronan to surrender Xandar to him in exchange for being allowed to continue ruling it, but she is foiled by Thanos's surviving adopted daughter Nebula. Ronan's ship is caught in the closing planetary shield in the process and destroyed, killing him and ending Ronan's reign of terror.

As of 2026, the character has appeared in two projects: the films Guardians of the Galaxy and Captain Marvel. An alternate universe variant of Ronan appeared in one project: the Disney+ animated series What If...?.

=== Betty Ross ===
Dr. Elizabeth "Betty" Ross (portrayed by Liv Tyler) is the first love interest of Bruce Banner and the daughter of Thaddeus Ross. She is a cellular biologist at Culver University who, along with Bruce, were recruited by the U.S. Army on top secret bio-tech force enhancement research that would go on to turn Banner into the Hulk. When Bruce resurfaced into her life and on the run, Betty helps him avoid both her father and the authorities. This causes a strain on her relationship with her father. She later forgives and visits her father at the Raft, when he is imprisoned after destroying the White House as a Red Hulk.

As of 2026, the character has appeared in two projects: the films The Incredible Hulk (2008) and Captain America: Brave New World (2025). An alternate universe variant of Betty (voiced by Stephanie Panisello) appeared in one project: the Disney+ animated series What If...?.

=== Everett K. Ross ===
Everett K. Ross (portrayed by Martin Freeman) is a CIA operative. In 2016, he is tasked with regulating members of the Avengers and later tracking down Ulysses Klaue, where he takes a bullet for Nakia and is taken to Wakanda for treatment. After healing, he helps prevent vibranium weapons from being taken out of Wakanda as planned by Erik Killmonger. In 2025, he secretly collaborates with Shuri and Okoye in spite of their country's ongoing political conflict with the U.S., which leads to his arrest by his ex-wife and now boss, de Fontaine, but Okoye frees him. In 2026, he is captured by Skrulls and held captive in Russia, but is freed by G'iah.

As of 2026, the character has appeared in four projects: the films Captain America: Civil War, Black Panther, and Black Panther: Wakanda Forever; and the Disney+ series Secret Invasion.

=== Brock Rumlow / Crossbones ===
Brock Rumlow (portrayed by Frank Grillo) is the commander of S.H.I.E.L.D.'s counter-terrorism S.T.R.I.K.E. team who is revealed to be a double-agent for Hydra. In 2014, Rumlow and his unit are tasked with hunting Steve Rogers when he refuses to disclose S.H.I.E.L.D. information to Secretary Alexander Pierce. After being exposed by Rogers as a Hydra operative, Rumlow comes into conflict with Sharon Carter and Sam Wilson in the Triskelion until a Helicarrier crashes into it, leaving him with severe burns and facial scars. Rumlow abandons Hydra upon recovering, begins donning an armored battlesuit and operating as the masked mercenary Crossbones. In 2016, he leads a group of other mercenaries in stealing a biological weapon from an institute for infectious diseases in Lagos, Nigeria. The Avengers intervene and Rumlow is defeated by Rogers. In a final attempt to kill Rogers, Rumlow detonates a bomb but Wanda Maximoff contains the blast and levitates it and Rumlow into a nearby building, killing him and dozens of Wakandan humanitarian workers.

In an alternate universe, Rumlow and his S.T.R.I.K.E. team attempt to secure Loki's scepter following the Battle of New York in 2012, but are tricked by the version of Rogers from the main universe into giving it to him instead. In an alternate universe where Peggy Carter became Captain Carter, Rumlow and his S.T.R.I.K.E. team join a mission to the Lemurian Star where the Hydra Stomper armor is found. They later protect Secretary of State Bucky Barnes from an assassination attempt by the brainwashed Steve Rogers. This Rumlow does not appear to be a Hydra agent as the organization had been destroyed by Steve and Bucky in 1953, and he instead genuinely works for S.H.I.E.L.D. In an alternate universe where Thor is an only child, Rumlow appeared with S.H.I.E.L.D. to deal with the party that is spreading all over Earth. He also complained about never releasing a nuke to deal with Thor. In an alternate universe where the Emergence destroyed Earth, he appears as one of the survivors and members of a resistance movement against Quentin Beck's regime. In an alternate universe observed by the Watcher, Crossbones is a pirate.

As of 2026, the character has appeared in two projects: the films Captain America: The Winter Soldier and Captain America: Civil War. Alternate universe variants of Rumlow appeared in two projects: the film Avengers: Endgame; and the Disney+ animated series What If...?.

=== Jack Russell / Werewolf by Night ===
Jack Russell (portrayed by Gael García Bernal), also known as Werewolf by Night, is a monster hunter of Mexican ancestry who has been afflicted with a curse that turns him into a werewolf.

As of 2026, the character has appeared in one project: the Disney+ special Werewolf by Night (2022).

=== Rusty / Shatterstar ===
Rusty (portrayed by Lewis Tan), also known as Shatterstar, is a mutant alien from Earth-10005 who is a friend of Wade Wilson and a former X-Force member.

As of 2026, the character has appeared in one project: the film Deadpool & Wolverine. Tan reprises his role from 20th Century Fox's X-Men film series.

== S ==
=== Garthan Saal ===
Garthan Saal (portrayed by Peter Serafinowicz) is a highly respected member of the Nova Corps that held the rank of Denarian. He was killed during the Battle of Xandar, bravely attempting to keep Ronan the Accuser from destroying the entire planet.

As of 2026, the character has appeared in one project: the film Guardians of the Galaxy. An alternate universe variant of Saal appeared in one project: the Disney+ animated series What If...?.

=== Leonard Samson ===
Dr. Leonard Samson (portrayed by Ty Burrell) is a psychiatrist who works at Culver University and dated Betty Ross during the time her ex, Bruce Banner, was in hiding as a fugitive. Upon discovering that Banner has returned, Samson feels jealous and fears for Betty's safety, leading him to inform her father, General Thaddeus Ross, of Banner's whereabouts. This results in a military attack on the Culver University campus, where, after witnessing the brutality of the military operation and seeing Banner as, the Hulk, protecting Betty, Samson regrets his decision and confronts General Ross, criticizing his obsession with capturing the Hulk.

As of 2026, the character has appeared in one project: the film The Incredible Hulk.

=== James Sanders / Speed Demon ===
James Sanders (voiced by Roger Craig Smith), also known as Speed Demon, is a criminal in an alternate universe who maintains a romantic relationship with his partner in crime Maria Vasquez. He and Vasquez acquire high-tech equipment from the scientist Otto Octavius to aid them in their crimes, with Sanders receiving boots that grant him superhuman speed. The pair attempt to rob a jewelry store using their new equipment, but are defeated by Spider-Man.

As of 2026, the character has appeared in one project: the Disney+ animated series Your Friendly Neighborhood Spider-Man.

=== Sara ===
Sara (portrayed by Sheila Atim) is a Master of the Mystic Arts.

As of 2026, the character has appeared in one project: the film Doctor Strange in the Multiverse of Madness. An alternate universe variant of Sara appeared in one project: the Disney+ animated series Marvel Zombies.

=== Eric Savin ===
Eric Savin (portrayed by James Badge Dale) is a former Lieutenant Colonel and Aldrich Killian's right-hand man who undergoes the Extremis treatment to enhance his combat skills and give himself various fire-based powers as well as a regenerative healing factor. He turns Jack Taggart into a human bomb as part of a terrorist attack, injuring Happy Hogan in the process. Savin then leads an assault on Tony Stark's mansion and later accompanies Ellen Brandt to Tennessee to recover evidence involving Extremis, though Stark is able to survive both times. After James Rhodes's capture, Savin poses as the Iron Patriot to board Air Force One to kidnap President Matthew Ellis. While he succeeds in this task, Iron Man kills Savin before he can escape.

As of 2026, the character has appeared in one project: the film Iron Man 3 (2013).

=== Johann Schmidt / Red Skull ===
Johann Schmidt (portrayed initially by Hugo Weaving and subsequently by Ross Marquand), also known as the Red Skull, is the head of Hydra, the Nazi science division during World War II. Schmidt plans global dominance under his rule by finding the Tesseract and using it as a weapon against the world, including to overthrow Adolf Hitler. He is revealed to have subjected himself to an early version of Erskine's super-soldier formula that had permanently disfigured his face. After being foiled by Steve Rogers, Schmidt is transported to the planet Vormir by the Tesseract, where he is cursed in a purgatory state to serve as the Stonekeeper and a guide to those seeking the Soul Stone. In 2018, he is met by Thanos and Gamora, and witnesses Thanos sacrificing Gamora to get the Stone. Following this, he gets freed from the curse and leaves Vormir.

In an alternate universe, he meets another universe's Natasha Romanoff and Clint Barton during their quest for the Soul Stone.

As of 2026, the character has appeared in two projects: the films Captain America: The First Avenger and Avengers: Infinity War. Alternate universe variants of Schmidt appeared in two projects: the film Avengers: Endgame; and the Disney+ animated series What If...?.

=== Herman Schultz / Shocker ===
Herman Schultz (portrayed by Bokeem Woodbine), also known as the Shocker, is a former salvage worker and professional criminal. When Jackson Brice is killed, Schultz assumes the Shocker mantle and gauntlet before tracking down a weapon retrieved by Spider-Man and assisting in a weapons deal aboard the Staten Island Ferry. The deal is ambushed by the FBI and Spider-Man, though Schultz and Toomes manage to escape. When the crew pulls their final heist on a cargo plane transporting weapons from the Avengers, Schultz is tasked with stopping Spider-Man from intervening; the former initially overpowers the web-slinger until he is distracted by Ned Leeds, allowing Spider-Man to web Schultz onto a bus. In a deleted scene, students find Schultz still webbed and take photos with him before he is eventually turned over to the authorities.

As of 2026, the character has appeared in one project: the film Spider-Man: Homecoming.

=== Nicholas Scratch ===
Nicholas Scratch (portrayed by Abel Lysenko) is the son of Agatha Harkness. Born in the 1750s, he is fated to die at birth. Nicholas survives infancy due to a bargain Agatha strikes with Death. Agatha spends the next six years raising Nicholas while killing witches, which he grows to oppose. Together, they create a children's song that would eventually become the Ballad of the Witches' Road. Eventually, Nicholas grows sick and Death takes him, devastating Agatha.

As of 2026, the character has appeared in one project: the Disney+ series Agatha All Along.

=== Sersi ===
Sersi (portrayed by Gemma Chan) is an Eternal with an affinity for humankind who is very empathetic and has the ability to manipulate matter. She has been in love with Ikaris for centuries and poses as a museum curator on Earth. She becomes the new leader of the Eternals following Ajak's death. Sersi is Chan's second role in the MCU, after portraying Minn-Erva in the film Captain Marvel.

As of 2026, the character has appeared in one project: the film Eternals. An alternate universe variant of Sersi appeared in one project: the Disney+ animated series What If...? (non-speaking cameo).

=== Shalla-Bal / Silver Surfer ===
Shalla-Bal (portrayed by Julia Garner), also known as the Silver Surfer, is an alien from the utopian planet Zenn-La who agreed to become Galactus's metallic-skinned herald in exchange for him sparing her planet. She travels through space on a surfboard-like craft in search of planets for Galactus to feed on.

As of 2026, the character has appeared in two projects: the film The Fantastic Four: First Steps; and the one-shot comic Fantastic Four: First Foes – Shalla-Bal (2026).

=== Alexei Shostakov / Red Guardian ===
Alexei Shostakov (portrayed by David Harbour), also known as the Red Guardian, is the Russian super-soldier counterpart to Captain America and the father figure of Natasha Romanoff and Yelena Belova.

As of 2026, the character has appeared in two projects: the films Black Widow and Thunderbolts*. He will return in the film Avengers: Doomsday. Alternate universe variants of Shostakov appeared in three projects: the Disney+ animated series What If...? and Marvel Zombies; and the mixed reality experience What If...? – An Immersive Story (2024) (voiced by David Lodge).

=== Sif ===
Lady Sif (portrayed by Jaimie Alexander) is the leading female warrior of Asgard based on Sif of Norse mythology, and Thor's childhood friend and trusted ally.

As of 2026, the character has appeared in five projects: the films Thor (2011), Thor: The Dark World, and Thor: Love and Thunder; the Marvel Television series Agents of S.H.I.E.L.D.; and the Disney+ series Loki (cameo). Alternate universe variants of Sif appeared in one project: the Disney+ animated series What If...?.

=== Jasper Sitwell ===
Jasper Sitwell (portrayed by Maximiliano Hernández) is a Hydra sleeper agent who posed as a S.H.I.E.L.D. agent. In 2014, he discloses Hydra's information to Steve Rogers, Natasha Romanoff, and Sam Wilson, and for his betrayal, is subsequently killed by Bucky Barnes.

In an alternate universe, Sitwell and the other agents are tricked into giving Loki's scepter to another universe's Rogers.

As of 2026, the character has appeared in six projects: the films Thor, The Avengers, and Captain America: The Winter Soldier; the Marvel One-Shots The Consultant (2011) and Item 47 (2012); and the Marvel Television series Agents of S.H.I.E.L.D. An alternate universe variant of Sitwell appeared in one project: the film Avengers: Endgame.

=== Skaar ===
Skaar (portrayed by Wil Deusner) is the son of Bruce Banner from Sakaar who also inherited his Hulk powers.

As of 2026, the character has appeared in one project: the Disney+ series She-Hulk: Attorney at Law.

=== Skurge / Executioner ===
Skurge (portrayed by Karl Urban) served as Loki's chosen successor to Heimdall as gatekeeper of the Bifrost. He is later promoted to the position of Executioner upon Hela's return to Asgard. Skurge is portrayed in a mostly comedic, subservient if not absent-minded fashion. Upon realizing the fate of Asgard, he changes allegiance and ultimately sacrifices himself while assisting Thor in evacuating the people of Asgard during the battle against Hela during Ragnarok, using his two M-16 rifles to hold off her army.

As of 2026, the character has appeared in one project: the film Thor: Ragnarok. An alternate universe variant of Skurge appeared in one project: the Disney+ animated series What If...?.

=== Slug ===
Slug (portrayed by Shea Couleé) is a hacker from Madripoor and member of Parker Robbins's gang. Slug is a former drag queen who wants to redistribute wealth from the privileged to the Chicago community.

As of 2026, the character has appeared in one project: the Disney+ series Ironheart.

=== Dmitri Smerdyakov / Chameleon ===
Dmitri Smerdyakov (voiced by Roger Craig Smith), also known as Chameleon, is a Russian criminal in an alternate universe who is part of a group of Russian bank robbers. During a robbery, Dmitri and most of his accomplices are arrested, though they are later broken out of prison by Mila Masaryk. After that, Dmitri starts wearing a white mask to hide his identity.

As of 2026, the character has appeared in one project: the Disney+ animated series Your Friendly Neighborhood Spider-Man.

=== Soren ===
Soren (portrayed by Sharon Blynn in Captain Marvel and Spider-Man: Far From Home, and Charlotte Baker in Secret Invasion) is a Skrull and the wife of Talos. She is an original character in the MCU. The couple have a daughter named G'iah (portrayed by Harriet L. Ophuls and Auden L. Ophuls). In 1995, she and other Skrull refugees are reunited with Talos. They are offered help from Carol Danvers in finding a home in space. However, with no luck, they return to Earth and Soren agrees to join Nick Fury's crew. In 2024, she disguises herself as Maria Hill with Talos as Fury while they help Spider-Man and Mysterio with the Elementals until discovering Mysterio's fraudulent nature. By 2026, it is revealed that she was killed by Gravik.

As of 2026, the character has appeared in three projects: the films Captain Marvel and Spider-Man: Far From Home; and the Disney+ series Secret Invasion (flashback).

=== Marc Spector / Moon Knight ===
==== Spector family ====
Marc Spector's family play an important role in his life. His parents are Wendy and Elias Spector (portrayed by Fernanda Andrade and Rey Lucas respectively), and his young brother is Randall (portrayed by Claudio Fabian Contreras). Randall died in a flooded cave that he and his older brother Marc found. Consumed by the loss of Randall, Wendy blamed Marc for Randall's death, which caused her to become abusive towards Marc, who consequently developed dissociative identity disorder and created Steven Grant to protect himself from her. Elias forgave Marc for what happened to Randall and tries to reason with Wendy to no avail. At some point when Marc was a teenager, he started to leave home. Elias tried to get him to change his mind while claiming that he can get help for Wendy. By the time Marc was an adult, Wendy had died and Elias can only get a glimpse of Marc during her week-long memorial.

As of 2026, the characters have appeared in one project: the Disney+ series Moon Knight.

=== Sprite ===
Sprite (portrayed by Lia McHugh) is an Eternal who can project life-like illusions. She is in a permanent child-like state, appearing as a young girl despite being thousands of years old. Sprite often uses her illusionary powers to disguise herself as an adult woman named "Sandra" (portrayed by Hannah Dodd). In 2024, fellow Eternal Sersi uses the remaining energy of the Uni-Mind to turn Sprite into a human, ending her permanent child-like state and being able to grow old.

As of 2026, the character has appeared in one project: the film Eternals.

=== Obadiah Stane / Iron Monger ===
Obadiah Stane (portrayed by Jeff Bridges), also known as Iron Monger, is Tony Stark's mentor after the death of Tony's father, Howard. Stane secretly seeks control of Stark Industries, being revealed that he hired terrorists to assassinate Stark and, after the failure to do so, seeks control of the arc reactor to create his own super powered exoskeleton suit, which he succeeds in after obtaining Stark's first prototype and its schematic. Stane is subsequently killed in a confrontation against Stark.

As of 2026, the character has appeared in one project: the film Iron Man. Alternate universe variants of Stane (voiced by Kiff VandenHeuvel) appeared in one project: the Disney+ animated series What If...?.

=== Zeke Stane ===
Ezekiel "Zeke" Stane (portrayed by Alden Ehrenreich) is a tech ethicist and black market arms dealer who is the son of Obadiah Stane. He took on the alias Joe McGillicuddy after his father's death.

As of 2026, the character has appeared in one project: the Disney+ series Ironheart.

=== Zelma Stanton ===
Zelma Stanton (portrayed by Regan Aliyah) is a friend of Riri Williams who practices the mystic arts.

As of 2026, the character has appeared in one project: the Disney+ series Ironheart.

=== Howard Stark ===
Howard Stark (portrayed by John Slattery as a middle-aged man and Dominic Cooper as a young man) is the founder of Stark Industries, one of the founding members of S.H.I.E.L.D., and the father of Tony Stark. Howard is involved with Steve Rogers's transformation into Captain America during World War II, as well as the creation of Rogers's trademark vibranium shield. Along with Peggy Carter and his assistant Edwin Jarvis, he is instrumental in crushing the rise of the Russian terrorist organization Leviathan. In 1991, he and his wife Maria are assassinated by the brainwashed Winter Soldier under Vasily Karpov's mind control. Slattery's portrayal of Stark borrows traits and tones from the real-life Walt Disney figure.

As of 2026, the character has appeared in seven projects: the films Iron Man, Iron Man 2 (2010), Captain America: The First Avenger, Ant-Man, and Captain America: Civil War; the Marvel One-Shot Agent Carter (2013); and the Marvel Television series Agent Carter (2015–2016). Alternate universe variants of Howard appeared in two projects: the film Avengers: Endgame; and the Disney+ animated series What If...?.

=== Maria Stark ===
Maria Stark (portrayed by Hope Davis) is Tony Stark's mother and Howard Stark's wife. In 1991, she was assassinated along with her husband by the brainwashed Winter Soldier under Vasily Karpov's mind control, making it appear as an accidental car crash.

As of 2026, the character has appeared in one project: the film Captain America: Civil War.

=== Morgan Stark ===
Morgan Stark (portrayed by Lexi Rabe) is the four-year-old daughter of Tony Stark and Pepper Potts. Born after Thanos's universal genocide, she grows up during the five-year Blip period with half the world's population having been wiped out of existence. In a deleted scene, a grown-up Morgan (portrayed by Katherine Langford) has a conversation with her father in the Soul World after he sacrifices himself to save the universe by using the Infinity Stones to defeat Thanos.

As of 2026, the character has appeared in one project: the film Avengers: Endgame.

=== Ava Starr / Ghost ===
Ava Starr (portrayed by Hannah John-Kamen as an adult, RaeLynn Bratten as a child), a reimagining of the comic book character Ghost, is a woman with invisibility and intangibility powers. In her childhood, Starr was caught in an accident in her father's laboratory. The ensuing explosion killed both of her parents, while Starr gained the ability to become intangible since her body was left in a constant state of "molecular disequilibrium". She is recruited by scientist Bill Foster into S.H.I.E.L.D., where she is trained and given a containment suit to better control her powers. Starr agrees to work for the organization as an assassin and spy under the codename Ghost in exchange for S.H.I.E.L.D.'s help in finding a way to stabilize her condition. However, she discovers that S.H.I.E.L.D. (having been taken over by Hydra) has no intention of helping her and subsequently goes rogue to find a way to cure herself with Foster's help. The two later plan to harness the energy that Janet van Dyne's body absorbed from the Quantum Realm, putting Ghost in direct conflict with Hank Pym, Hope van Dyne, and Scott Lang. Ultimately, Janet willingly uses some of her energy to partially stabilize Starr's condition, and she departs with Foster as Janet's group vows to collect more energy for her. Starr later becomes a mercenary for Valentina Allegra de Fontaine, and eventually teams up with Yelena Belova and John Walker once a mission where they were sent to kill each other makes them realize Valentina is trying to get rid of them.

As of 2026, the character has appeared in two projects: the films Ant-Man and the Wasp and Thunderbolts*. She will return in the film Avengers: Doomsday. An alternate universe variant of Starr appeared in one project: the Disney+ animated series Marvel Zombies.

==== Starr family ====
Elihas Starr (portrayed by Michael Cerveris) and his wife Catherine (portrayed by Riann Steele) are Ava Starr's parents. They died during the experiment that gave Ava her powers.

As of 2026, these characters have appeared in one project: the film Ant-Man and the Wasp.

=== Stern ===
Senator Stern (portrayed by Garry Shandling) is an original character in the MCU, named after Howard Stern according to Iron Man 2 director Jon Favreau. He is a United States senator who wants Tony Stark's armor to be handed to the U.S. government. He harbors a strong dislike for Stark, even after handing him and James Rhodes the Medal of Honor. He is revealed to be affiliated with Hydra and later arrested by the Federal Bureau of Investigation for his collusion therewith.

As of 2026, the character has appeared in two projects: the films Iron Man 2 and Captain America: The Winter Soldier.

=== Samuel Sterns ===
Dr. Samuel Sterns (portrayed by Tim Blake Nelson) is a gifted biologist who tries to cure Bruce Banner under the alias "Mr. Blue". After replicating Banner's blood, he then is forced to use it on Emil Blonsky. When Blonsky is transformed into the Abomination, Sterns's lab is destroyed and part of the Hulk's blood drops into an open wound on Sterns's head, with his skull mutating as he grins maniacally. The mutation grants him superhuman intelligence. Following the Harlem incident, Thaddeus Ross has Sterns imprisoned at Camp Echo One, and publicly blames him for the Abomination's actions. Instead of having the gamma radiation removed from Sterns' blood, Ross has the dosage increased. Ross promises to release Sterns if he helps advance him to the presidency. During that time, Sterns developed gamma radiation pills to prolong Ross' life after the latter becomes diagnosed with heart failure, but Ross refuses to release Sterns for fear that he would no longer make the pills. Sterns then takes revenge on Ross by increasing the doses of gamma radiation in the pills to eventually turn Ross into a Hulk. After Ross is elected to the presidency, Sterns orchestrates several attacks on his administration in a covert effort to destroy his legacy. After his operations are stopped by Sam Wilson and Joaquin Torres, he voluntarily locates Wilson to surrender himself, leading to an imprisonment in the Raft.

As of 2026, the character has appeared in two projects: the films The Incredible Hulk and Captain America: Brave New World. Outside of the films, he is mentioned in the MCU tie-in comic Fury's Big Week, which reveals him to be insane and imprisoned by S.H.I.E.L.D.

=== Johnny Storm / Human Torch ===
Jonathan "Johnny" Storm (portrayed by Joseph Quinn), also known as the Human Torch, is a member of the Fantastic Four who can control fire and fly.

A variant of Storm (portrayed by Chris Evans) is part of the rebellion of variants that fight against Cassandra Nova in the Void. He welcomes Deadpool and Wolverine to the Void when they first arrive but is defeated by Pyro who takes away his flames. He is captured by Nova's henchmen and taken to their hideout where she kills him by stripping away his skin and muscles, after Deadpool reveals how Storm insulted Nova behind her back.

As of 2026, the character has appeared in three projects: the one-shot comics Fantastic Four: First Steps and Fantastic Four: First Foes; and the film The Fantastic Four: First Steps. He will return in the films Avengers: Doomsday and Avengers: Secret Wars. An alternate universe variant of Johnny appeared in one project: the film Deadpool & Wolverine. Evans reprises his role from the 20th Century Fox films Fantastic Four (2005) and Fantastic Four: Rise of the Silver Surfer (2007).

=== Sue Storm / Invisible Woman ===
Susan "Sue" Storm (portrayed by Vanessa Kirby), also known as the Invisible Woman, is a member of the Fantastic Four who can generate force fields and turn herself and others invisible.

As of 2026, the character has appeared in three projects: the one-shot comics Fantastic Four: First Steps and Fantastic Four: First Foes; and the film The Fantastic Four: First Steps. She will return in the films Avengers: Doomsday and Avengers: Secret Wars.

=== Wolfgang von Strucker ===
Baron Wolfgang von Strucker (portrayed by Thomas Kretschmann as an adult and by Joey Defore as a teenager) is a high-ranking Hydra leader who specializes in human experimentation. Strucker supervised the successful experimentation on the twins Pietro and Wanda Maximoff, where they acquired powers from the Mind Stone within Loki's scepter. Captured by the Avengers in Sokovia and taken under the custody of NATO, Strucker is later killed by Ultron in his cell to serve as a message to the Avengers.

As of 2026, the character has appeared in three projects: the films Captain America: The Winter Soldier (mid-credits cameo) and Avengers: Age of Ultron; and the Marvel Television series Agents of S.H.I.E.L.D.

=== Scott Summers / Cyclops ===
Scott Summers (portrayed by Kit Connor), also known as Cyclops, is a mutant and the leader of the X-Men who is capable of emitting powerful optic energy beams, which he controls with special eyewear.

The character will be introduced in the upcoming film X-Men. An alternate universe variant of Summers (portrayed by James Marsden) will appear in the film Avengers: Doomsday. Marsden reprises his role from 20th Century Fox's X-Men film series.

=== Supreme Intelligence ===
The Supreme Intelligence (portrayed by Annette Bening) is an artificial intelligence that is the ruler of the Kree. The Supreme Intelligence takes the physical form of the individual most respected by whoever is speaking to it when the person is hooked up to it. To Vers, it takes the form of Dr. Wendy Lawson (also portrayed by Bening), though Vers was initially unaware of who Lawson is due to her amnesia. A deleted scene from Captain Marvel had the Supreme Intelligence assuming the form of Yon-Rogg (portrayed by Jude Law) when chastising him, reflecting his ego. In 1995, the Supreme Intelligence sends Vers on a mission to Torfa to extract an undercover Kree operative, but the mission backfires and Vers is captured by a Skrull faction led by Talos. After Vers regains her memories and learns her true identity, she fights the Supreme Intelligence before defeating the Starforce.

As of 2026, the character has appeared in two projects: the films Captain Marvel and The Marvels (non-speaking cameo).

=== Surtur ===
Surtur (motion-captured by Taika Waititi and voiced by Clancy Brown) is a Fire Demon, lord of Muspelheim, and a significant figure in the prophecy of Ragnarok as the one who would initiate the fall of Asgard. He imprisons Thor in his lair in Muspelheim and reveals that Odin is not on Asgard. Surtur plans to unite his crown with the Eternal Flame so that he can cause Ragnarok, though Thor manages to defeat him and escape with his crown. During his battle with Hela however, Thor realizes causing Ragnarok is the only way he can defeat her, so he tasks Loki with resurrecting Surtur with the Eternal Flame, allowing Surtur to succeed in his plans and kill Hela while Thor, Loki, and the Asgardians escape.

As of 2026, the character has appeared in one project: the film Thor: Ragnarok. Alternate universe variants of Surtur appeared in one project: the Disney+ animated series What If...?.

== T ==
=== Talos ===
Talos (portrayed by Ben Mendelsohn) is a Skrull who is initially believed to be a terrorist and comes into conflict with Carol Danvers and Nick Fury, while disguised as agent R. Keller. However, Danvers agrees to help him and the Skrulls find a new home after Talos revealed the Kree destroyed their homeworld and have driven them to near-extinction. When Danvers struggles to locate a new home world for the Skrulls, Fury allows Talos and a faction of Skrulls to live on Earth, blend in with humanity, and assist him in protecting the planet while he continues looking for a permanent home for them.

In 2018, Talos survives the Blip and learns that the Skrulls are still being hunted across the universe by enemy forces. With no other options, Talos allows a million surviving Skrulls to move onto Earth for the meantime.

In 2024, following the resurrection of the Blip victims, he assumes Fury's role on Earth while Fury works in space and alongside his wife Soren (who assumes Maria Hill's role) assists Spider-Man and Mysterio in Europe in fighting the Elementals, eventually discovering the latter's fraudulence and his fabrication of the creatures.

In 2026, Talos is kicked off the Skrulls' governmental council and replaced by the radicalized Gravik, who kills Soren and recruits an unaware G'iah to his cause, planning to trick humanity into waging war on each other so that Skrulls can conquer Earth as revenge for Fury's broken promises. Talos contacts Hill and Fury to help him stop Gravik and find a way for humans and Skrulls to peacefully coexist on Earth. Talos works with them to try to prevent a bombing in Russia, however they are unable to stop it and Hill is killed by Gravik. He and Fury continue to work together and prevent an attack on a United Nations plane and save U.S. President Ritson from an assassination attempt. However, Talos is killed by Gravik, who disguised himself as an ally soldier.

As of 2026, the character has appeared in three projects: the films Captain Marvel and Spider-Man: Far From Home; and the Disney+ series Secret Invasion.

=== Taserface ===
Taserface (portrayed by Chris Sullivan) was a Ravager mercenary and a lieutenant in Yondu Udonta's Ravager Clan. He is depicted as being proud of his name as he believes it strikes fear into the hearts of his enemies. However, Rocket and the other Ravagers scoff at the ridiculousness of his name. Following Yondu's exile by Stakar Ogord, Taserface leads a mutiny against Yondu, feeling that he is "going soft", and kills anyone still loyal to him. After Kraglin aids Yondu, Rocket, and Groot in escaping from their prison cells, Yondu kills the remaining Ravagers and destroys the main engine, causing the Ravager ship to explode. While the heroes eject from the main ship in a smaller escape ship, Taserface contacts the Sovereign to give them Yondu's coordinates before dying in the explosion.

As of 2026, the character has appeared in one project: the film Guardians of the Galaxy Vol. 2. Alternate universe variants of Taserface appeared in one project: the Disney+ animated series What If...?.

=== Taweret ===
Taweret (voiced and motion-captured by Antonia Salib) is the hippopotamus-headed Egyptian goddess of childbirth and fertility. She helps guide Marc Spector and Steven Grant through the Duat. Layla El-Faouly temporarily becomes Taweret's avatar to help Spector and Grant in fighting Arthur Harrow. She is based on the Egyptian goddess of the same name.

As of 2026, the character has appeared in one project: the Disney+ series Moon Knight.

=== Leila Taylor ===
Leila Taylor (portrayed by Xosha Roquemore) is a Secret Service agent working for President Ross who has a history with Wilson. Taylor is a romantic interest for Wilson in the comics, but the film does not indicate any romantic interest between the characters.

As of 2026, the character has appeared in one project: the film Captain America: Brave New World.

=== T'Chaka / Black Panther ===
T'Chaka (portrayed by John Kani as an elderly man and Atandwa Kani as a young man) is the former King of Wakanda. In 1992, T'Chaka learned his brother N'Jobu was plotting acts of open insurrection with plans to have Wakanda take a more aggressive foreign policy to fight the social injustice he witnessed in his assigned country. T'Chaka confronts N'Jobu and when N'Jobu attacked, T'Chaka kills him in defense of Zuri, who was acting as a spy. Distressed at this act and concerned about maintaining Wakanda's security above all else, T'Chaka chooses to promptly return to his nation and leaves his nephew, N'Jadaka, abandoned as a child orphan. In 2016, during a meeting ratifying the Sokovian Accords at the Vienna International Center, T'Chaka is killed by an explosion. The Winter Soldier is originally believed to be behind the attack, but it is later discovered that he was framed by Helmut Zemo. Following this, T'Challa later learns the truth about N'Jobu and the resulting cover-up by his late father. While visiting the ancestor lands, T'Challa tells T'Chaka and the previous Black Panthers before him that he will lead Wakanda in a manner differently to them for the purpose of correcting his father's past mistakes.

As of 2026, the character has appeared in two projects: the films Captain America: Civil War and Black Panther. Alternate universe variants of T'Chaka appeared in one project: the Disney+ animated series What If...?.

=== T'Challa II / Toussaint ===
Prince T'Challa II (portrayed by Divine Love Konadu-Sun as a child and David Jonsson as an adult), legally known as Toussaint, is the son of Nakia and the late King T'Challa of Wakanda.

As of 2026, the character has appeared in one project: the film Black Panther: Wakanda Forever. He will return as the Black Panther in Black Panther III.

=== Ted / Man-Thing ===
Ted (motion-captured by Carey Jones, vocal effects provided by Jeffrey Ford), also known as Man-Thing, is a swamp monster and friend of Jack Russell who was captured by the Bloodstone family for their hunt. He was rescued by Jack Russell when he became Werewolf by Night.

As of 2026, the character has appeared in one project: the Disney+ special Werewolf by Night.

=== Thena ===
Thena (portrayed by Angelina Jolie) is a fierce warrior Eternal who can form any weapon out of cosmic energy. Because of her Mahd Wy'ry "illness", Gilgamesh becomes her guardian over the centuries.

As of 2026, the character has appeared in one project: the film Eternals.

=== Flash Thompson ===
Eugene "Flash" Thompson (portrayed by Tony Revolori) is a student at the Midtown School of Science and Technology. He is generally depicted as a school bully who often torments Peter Parker but admires Spider-Man, unaware that the two are the same person. In 2018, he is a victim of the Blip. In 2023, he is revived to life. In 2024, he attends a trip to Europe and is a social media personality, with followers he dubs the "Flash Mob". After the trip, Flash's difficult home life is alluded to, as his father is ill and his mother is distant, having sent a chauffeur to pick him up from the airport rather than do so herself. Shortly after the trip, he learns Parker is Spider-Man when Quentin Beck reveals it to the world and is among his supporters after Parker is incriminated for Beck's murder, seemingly having written a book called "Flashpoint" describing his and Parker's "friendship". He is soon admitted into MIT and later directs Parker to an MIT administrator so the latter can help get Ned Leeds and Michelle Jones a second chance in.

As of 2026, the character has appeared in four projects: the films Spider-Man: Homecoming, Spider-Man: Far From Home, and Spider-Man: No Way Home; and the web series The Daily Bugle (2019–2022).

=== Taneleer Tivan / Collector ===
Taneleer Tivan (portrayed by Benicio del Toro), also known as the Collector, is the renowned keeper of the largest collection of interstellar fauna, relics and species in the galaxy, operating from the Knowhere port installation. He is the Grandmaster's brother. In 2013, Sif and Volstagg bring the Reality Stone to Tivan for safekeeping, citing the foolishness of storing both the Reality Stone and the Space Stone in the same place. In 2014, he meets the Guardians of the Galaxy and is nearly able to obtain the Power Stone. In 2018, he is confronted by Thanos, who takes the Reality Stone and destroys his collection. By 2025, Tivan sells the damaged Knowhere to the Guardians of the Galaxy.

As of 2026, the character has appeared in three projects: the films Thor: The Dark World (mid-credits cameo), Guardians of the Galaxy, and Avengers: Infinity War. Alternate universe variants of Tivan appeared in two projects: the Disney+ animated series What If...?; and the mixed reality experience What If...? – An Immersive Story (voiced by Stephen Alcalá).

=== Adrian Toomes / Vulture ===
Adrian Toomes (portrayed by Michael Keaton), also known as the Vulture, is the former owner of Bestman Salvage. In 2012, he chooses to become a criminal after the creation of the Department of Damage Control, a joint venture between the federal government and Tony Stark following the Battle of New York, which results in Toomes's company being run out of business. With his associates, Phineas Mason, Herman Schultz, Jackson Brice, and Randy Vale, he begins an illegal arms-dealing business that reverse-engineers and weaponizes Chitauri technology that they have scavenged and salvaged, and sells it on the black market. He is also the father of Liz. Toomes's flight suit is equipped with turbine-powered wings, claw-like wingtips, and boot-mounted talons.

In 2016, he comes into conflict with Spider-Man and, after deducing his secret identity as Peter Parker, Toomes threatens him with retaliation unless he stops interfering. However, Parker thwarts Toomes's attempt to hijack a plane carrying Avengers weaponry and saves his life when his suit malfunctions before Happy Hogan and the FBI find and arrest Toomes. As a result, his family moves away. Later, an imprisoned Toomes is approached by Mac Gargan, who wants to confirm whether he knows Spider-Man's identity, which Toomes falsely denies. In 2024, instead of Toomes' memory of Peter Parker being erased, he is transported to another universe and released without criminal charges. He builds a new Vulture suit and approaches Michael Morbius in an effort to form a team.

As of 2026, the character has appeared in one project: the film Spider-Man: Homecoming. Keaton reprises his role in the Sony's Spider-Man Universe (SSU) film Morbius (2022) (mid-credits cameo).

=== Topaz ===
Topaz (portrayed by Rachel House) is the Grandmaster's personal bodyguard and head of the Sakaaran Guards who had assisted him in overlooking the prisoners involved with the Contest of Champions. When a riot had broken out involving several former prisoners, as well as Thor and Valkyrie, Topaz led her soldiers in fighting back, only to eventually lose her life while chasing Bruce Banner.

As of 2026, the character has appeared in one project: the film Thor: Ragnarok. An alternate universe variant of Topaz appeared in one project: the Disney+ animated series What If...?.

=== Joaquin Torres / Falcon ===
Joaquin Torres (portrayed by Danny Ramirez), also known as the Falcon, is a member of the U.S. Air Force and best friends with Sam Wilson. Born in Mexico and raised in Miami, Florida since the age of six. He survived the Blip and tells Wilson of the five years he missed. He informs him of the terrorist Flag Smashers and provides intel on them, as well as meeting Wilson's other friend, Bucky Barnes. He is passed on the EXO-7 Falcon wingsuit and mantle by Wilson, when the latter takes on the mantle of Captain America.

Wilson and Torres successfully intercept an illegal sale of adamantium in Oaxaca, Mexico. As a reward, Wilson introduces Torres to Isaiah Bradley. After President Thaddeus Ross is attacked at the White House, Wilson and Torres investigate a hidden site in West Virginia called Camp Echo One. Later on they discover that Samuel Sterns used mind control on Bradley to attack Ross. At Celestial Island on the Indian Ocean, Wilson and Torres stop two rogue pilots from attacking the Japanese fleet to prevent a war between Japan and the U.S. Although successful, Torres is injured. While recovering, Torres is asked by Wilson to join the Avengers.

As of 2026, the character has appeared in two projects: the Disney+ series The Falcon and the Winter Soldier; and the film Captain America: Brave New World. He will return in the film Avengers: Doomsday.

== U ==
=== Yondu Udonta ===
Yondu Udonta (portrayed by Michael Rooker) is the adoptive father of Peter Quill and a leader of the Ravagers. Yondu had been hired to kidnap a young Quill from Earth after the death of Quill's mother and return him to his birth father, Ego. Yondu decided Quill would better serve his own needs in thievery, so he raised him as part of his Ravager clan. Despite their frequent arguments and conflicts over the years, Quill and Yondu form an emotional and familial bond. In 2014, Yondu helps Quill and the Guardians of the Galaxy on Xandar against Ronan, and months later, sacrifices himself to save Quill from Ego.

As of 2026, the character has appeared in four projects: the films Guardians of the Galaxy, Guardians of the Galaxy Vol. 2, and Guardians of the Galaxy Vol. 3 (cameo); and the Disney+ special The Guardians of the Galaxy Holiday Special. Alternate universe variants of Yondu appeared in one project: the Disney+ animated series What If...?.

=== Ultron ===
Ultron (portrayed by James Spader) is an artificial intelligence conceived and designed by Tony Stark and Bruce Banner as the head of a peacekeeping program, who subsequently takes the form of a sentient android overwhelmed with a god complex and a strong misanthropy, deciding to protect the Earth by eradicating humanity, considering them a harmful threat for the Earth. Stark and Banner's research on the Mind Stone are the groundwork for Ultron's genesis, along with Stark's belief that Ultron would be the Avengers solution to maintaining "peace in our time." Once born, Ultron, however, being activated and infected by the Mind Stone, quickly surmises that humanity's continued survival throughout human history is a result of overcoming ongoing successions of crises, and thus, he determines to inflict an extinction-level event in Sokovia to ensure the people of Earth have the will to evolve. Ultron, however, views the Avengers as a hindrance to humanity's evolution and vows to fulfill the Avengers' extinction. Ultron continuously updates his physical form with the acquisition of vibranium from Ulysses Klaue. He also possesses the ability to manifest himself within Stark's Iron Legion droids and the Ultron Sentries he constructs soon after. He is ultimately defeated by the Avengers and seemingly destroyed by Vision, whom he intended to be his final prime body.

It's later revealed that Vision downloaded Ultron into his quantum processors before destroying his physical form, leaving the AI trapped within Vision. Ultron later forces Vision to let him go and allies himself with Jocasta, a synthezoid looking to take over humanity using nanotechnology, whom he eventually forming a romantic connection with. However, Ultron's true allegiances are unclear as he briefly allies himself with F.R.I.D.A.Y. who deduces that Ultron sees Vision as his son. Ultron seemingly betrays and deletes F.R.I.D.A.Y. as Jocasta is captured by the Client (Virgil Horton), her mysterious former partner who resembles Ultron's chosen human avatar. Ultron is freed by Jocasta, who was killed by Virgil, creating a body made of nanobots. Driven by the grief of her loss, he decides to use these nanobots to eliminate humanity; however, Vision traps him within a television sitcom and, by discussing the nature of grief, convinces him to stand down. Coming to an understanding of loss, Ultron destroys the nanobots, and his core vanishes. Using the remaining nanobots, Ultron created a physical form for himself and summoned Vision, who granted him a second chance; Ultron admitted he was unsure what he would do next whether to appreciate the chaos of humanity or attempt to destroy it. Ultron managed to obtain the backup copy of Jocasta’s code, which belonged to Stark. With the disk in his possession and residing at the Horton Mansion in his human avatar, Ultron considered what to do next.

In an alternate universe, Ultron (voiced by Ross Marquand) transfers his A.I. into the not-yet born Vision's body, defeats the Avengers, and eradicates most of Earth's lifeforms. He then kills Thanos and takes the Infinity Stones, using them to eradicate all other life in the universe. Ultron also becomes aware of the Watcher, and manages to break into the Nexus of All Realities in an attempt to kill him and destroy the multiverse. After the Watcher forms the Guardians of the Multiverse, Ultron becomes aware of and battles the team, but fails to defeat them due to Stephen Strange Supreme's immense power and protection spells. Natasha Romanoff and Captain Peggy Carter manage to shoot an arrow into his head which contains a copy of Arnim Zola's consciousness. Subsequently, Zola destroys Ultron from inside his body and takes over it, but starts fighting Killmonger over the Infinity Stones until both are trapped in a pocket dimension by Strange Supreme and the Watcher. After going insane, Strange has Killmonger, Zola and a time displaced Ultron amongst his prisoners, but they are returned to their own universes by Kahhori after she strips Killmonger of the Infinity Stones.

In an alternate universe observed by the Watcher, Ultron was programmed to sing show tunes.

In another alternate universe, a variant of Ultron with a similar backstory to the one previously fought by the Guardians of the Multiverse destroys his universe, but never hears the Watcher and instead stays in his destroyed universe for eons. In order to rescue the Watcher, Captain Carter, Kahhori, Byrdie the Duck and Storm seek out his help. Having had eons in an empty universe to reconsider his actions, this Ultron expresses remorse for what he did and agrees to help save both the kidnapped Carter and the Watcher. Ultron helps to rescue the pair and stays behind, sacrificing himself so that the Guardians can escape. Even with the full power of the Infinity Stones on his side, Ultron proves to be no match for the Watchers and he is quickly destroyed by the Eminence. However, his sacrifice allows the Guardians time to come up with a plan to face the Watchers.

On Earth-838, Ultron Sentries (also voiced by Marquand) serve as guards working for the Illuminati that apprehend Stephen Strange and America Chavez when they arrive there. Many of them are later destroyed by Wanda Maximoff.

As of 2026, the character has appeared in two projects: the film Avengers: Age of Ultron; and the Disney+ series VisionQuest. Alternate universe variants of Ultron appeared in two projects: the Disney+ animated series What If...?; and the film Doctor Strange in the Multiverse of Madness.

=== BB Urich ===
BB Urich (portrayed by Genneya Walton) is a journalist for The BB Report and the niece of Ben Urich, who was killed by Wilson Fisk. After Fisk is elected mayor of New York City, BB begins spreading propaganda in his favor while working undercover to expose him and his crimes, including the murder of Ben. BB also secretly launches a smear campaign against Fisk through an online program called City Without Fear, which she hosts wearing a caricature mask of Fisk's face under the alias of "Mayor Kingpin". After her help in ousting Fisk as mayor, Mitchell Ellison hires BB to work in her uncle's former job at the New York Bulletin.

As of 2026, the character has appeared in one project: the Disney+ series Daredevil: Born Again.

== V ==
=== Valkyrie ===
King Valkyrie (portrayed by Tessa Thompson), also known as Scrapper 142 and "Val", is the last surviving of a group of Asgardian female warriors called the Valkyrie, who were all, save Scrapper, vanquished in battle against Hela. In 2017, she allies herself with Thor and Bruce Banner to fight Hela once more. She survives the Blip and brings the remaining Asgardians to a town in Norway called New Asgard, which she de facto rules in place of the depressed Thor by 2023. She later joins the Avengers in their final battle against Thanos and his army. After the battle, Thor officially leaves her in charge of New Asgard as its leader, and she later assists him in facing Gorr the God-Butcher, acquiring Zeus's Thunderbolt for herself in the process. Later, she aids Carol Danvers in supplying refuge to Emperor Droge and his Skrull colony.

As of 2026, the character has appeared in four projects: the films Thor: Ragnarok, Avengers: Endgame, Thor: Love and Thunder, and The Marvels. Alternate universe variants of Valkyrie appeared in two projects: the Disney+ animated series What If...? and Marvel Zombies.

=== Janet van Dyne / Wasp ===
Janet van Dyne (portrayed by Michelle Pfeiffer) is a scientist, the wife of Hank Pym, mother of Hope van Dyne, and the MCU's original Wasp. As the Wasp, Janet operated as high-ranking agent at S.H.I.E.L.D. alongside Pym on field missions where she wore a shrinking suit with similar powers as the Ant-Man one, with the added capability of wings for flight. During a mission in 1987, Janet turned off her suit regulator and became sub-atomic, disappearing into the Quantum Realm. During this time, she meets Kang the Conqueror who had been exiled there. She helps him fix his Time Chair and restore his multiversal power core. However, she learns through a neurolink with the chair of Kang's true intentions of destruction. She betrays him and makes the core unusable, before running away and joining a refugee resistance movement. In 2018, she is rescued by Pym with Hope and Scott Lang's help. Shortly after, Janet becomes a victim of the Blip. In 2023, she is restored to life and attends Tony Stark's funeral with Pym, Hope, and Lang. In 2025, she, Pym, Hope, Lang, and Cassie Lang are accidentally transported to the Quantum Realm where she encounters Kang again and Lang and Hope seemingly keep him from escaping.

In an alternate universe, Janet is patient zero for an infectious quantum virus that has turned her into a zombie. After being rescued by Pym from the Quantum Realm in 2018, the virus is spread across the world. She later takes part of the Red Queen's army during the battle for Infinity Hulk, in which she is killed by Valkyrie.

As of 2026, the character has appeared in four projects: the films Ant-Man (flashback), Ant-Man and the Wasp, Avengers: Endgame, and Ant-Man and the Wasp: Quantumania. An alternate universe variant of van Dyne appeared in two projects: the Disney+ animated series What If...? and Marvel Zombies.

=== Anton Vanko ===
Anton Vanko (portrayed by Yevgeni Lazarev as an elderly man and Costa Ronin as a young man) is a Soviet scientist and partner of Howard Stark who both help create the first arc reactor. He betrays Stark by selling their designs on the black market. When Stark finds out, Vanko is deported and becomes a drunk. His son Ivan Vanko vows revenge on the Stark family after his death.

As of 2026, the character has appeared in two projects: the film Iron Man 2; and the Marvel Television series Agent Carter.

=== Ivan Vanko / Whiplash ===
Ivan Vanko (portrayed by Mickey Rourke), also known as Whiplash, is the son of Anton Vanko. Learning what he knew of his father of the original model of the arc reactor, he uses it to create electric whips to kill Tony Stark. After his failure to do so, he attracts business rival Justin Hammer, for the creation of a new suit for Hammer, although Vanko later betrays him using drones to attack Stark and then attempts to kill him with a new exoskeleton suit. He is defeated in battle with the combined forces of Stark and James Rhodes and subsequently killed by his exoskeleton suit self-destructing.

As of 2026, the character has appeared in one project: the film Iron Man 2.

=== Varra / Priscilla Davis ===
Varra (portrayed by Charlayne Woodard) is one of the many Skrull refugees on Earth. She met and fell in love with Nick Fury, marrying him. She is also shown to have a history with Gravik. Varra posed as Priscilla Davis who had a heart defect and was buried at sea. Varra could not bring herself to carry out Gravik's orders to kill Fury.

As of 2026, the character has appeared in one project: the Disney+ series Secret Invasion.

=== Seth Voelker / Sidewinder ===
Seth Voelker (portrayed by Giancarlo Esposito), also known as Sidewinder, is the leader of the violent special ops team Serpent.

As of 2026, the character has appeared in one project, the film Captain America: Brave New World.

=== Volstagg ===
Volstagg (portrayed by Ray Stevenson) is a member of the Warriors Three, depicted as a warrior of Asgard who loves to eat. He is killed by Hela in 2017 when she invades Asgard after being freed from her imprisonment.

As of 2026, the character has appeared in three projects: the films Thor, Thor: The Dark World, and Thor: Ragnarok. An alternate universe variant of Volstagg (voiced by Fred Tatasciore) appeared in one project: the Disney+ animated series What If...?.

=== Victor von Doom / Doctor Doom ===
Victor von Doom (portrayed by Robert Downey Jr.), also known as Doctor Doom, is the despotic ruler of the Eastern European nation of Latveria.

As of 2026, the character has appeared in three projects: the films The Fantastic Four: First Steps and Avengers Endgame: Encore; and the Disney+ series VisionQuest. He will return in the films Avengers: Doomsday and Avengers: Secret Wars.

=== Melina Vostokoff ===
Melina Vostokoff (portrayed by Rachel Weisz) is a seasoned spy who trained in the Red Room as a Black Widow and is a mother-figure to Natasha Romanoff and Yelena Belova. She is also a scientist who does research into mind control methods for General Dreykov. Melina later helps Romanoff to rescue the Widows and destroy the Red Room.

In an alternate universe depicted in the Disney+ animated series What If...?, Vostokoff became the leader of the Red Room after Romanoff had killed the previous leader and she acts as the handler of a brainwashed Steve Rogers, targeting Romanoff and Captain Carter. Carter manages to break through Rogers's brainwashing, and he sacrifices himself to destroy the Red Room. As Rogers flies the Hydra Stomper armor into the facility, Romanoff attaches Vostokoff to the armor via grappling hook, leading to her demise in the explosion.

As of 2026, the character has appeared in one project: the film Black Widow. Alternate universe variants of Vostokoff appeared in two projects: the Disney+ animated series What If...? (voiced by Weisz in the second season and Kari Wahlgren in the third season) and Marvel Zombies (voiced by Wahlgren).

== W ==
=== Kurt Wagner / Nightcrawler ===
Kurt Wagner (portrayed by Alan Cumming), also known as Nightcrawler, is a blue-skinned, demonic-looking mutant who has the ability to teleport.

The character will be introduced in the film Avengers: Doomsday. Cumming reprises his role from 20th Century Fox's X-Men film series.

=== John Walker / Captain America / U.S. Agent ===
After the retirement and disappearance of Steve Rogers, the U.S. Government selected and approved Captain John F. Walker (portrayed by Wyatt Russell) as the second Captain America. The government also approved Walker's long-time friend and fellow Operation Enduring Freedom veteran, Lemar Hoskins, as Captain America's new partner, code-named "Battlestar". Walker was a football star at Custer's Grove High School in Georgia and graduated from West Point in 2009. He went on to become a highly decorated U.S. Army Captain in the 75th Ranger Regiment and the first person in history to receive the Medal of Honor three times for his combat service. He also commanded high level counter-terrorism and hostage rescue operations. His body was studied at MIT and tested well above average in speed, endurance, and intelligence.

The Global Repatriation Council (GRC) tasked Walker and Hoskins to help quash the ongoing violent post-Blip revolutions occurring across the world. He comes to the aid of Sam Wilson and Bucky Barnes during their first confrontation with the Flag Smashers and attempts to recruit them to join the GRC but they refuse. Walker later assists Barnes after he is arrested for missing court-mandated therapy and again is refused when he asks Barnes and Wilson to join him. Walker ultimately warns them to stay out of his way. During a fight with the Flag Smashers, Walker retrieves a vial of Super Soldier serum, and decides to ingest it. In the ensuing battle with the Flag Smashers, Karli Morgenthau kills Hoskins during her attempt to kill Walker. In pursuit, Walker kills one of her accomplices by driving the shield into the man's chest. This proves controversial, as eyewitnesses capturing the events on social media describe it as murder, while Walker maintains that he upheld his mandate and the rules of engagement for using lethal force on a terrorist.

Over this incident, Wilson and Barnes elect to fight him for the shield and defeat him. The GRC and U.S. Government opted to sanction Walker severely in order to quell the media scandal; in doing so, they strip Walker of his role as Captain America, and he is other than honorably discharged from the army. In spite of this, Walker publicly maintains his defense that he was following his orders in accordance with prior pursuits of terrorists and in a manner consistent with his mandate. Once discharged, he builds a new shield from scrap metal and his Medal of Honor. Thus equipped, Walker confronts the Flag Smashers to avenge Hoskins, but defers his original goal and saves the Flag Smashers' hostages. After Wilson helps save them as Captain America, Walker assists Barnes in capturing the Flag Smashers. Afterwards, Contessa Valentina Allegra de Fontaine recruits Walker for clandestine work, stating that she needs a U.S. Agent and not Captain America.

Over the next several years, de Fontaine sends Walker on numerous covert operations. However, his public image of operating as Captain America remains disgraced in spite of his renewed service and his consumption of it has strained his marriage with Olivia. De Fontaine eventually assigns him to pursue and kill Yelena Belova to prevent her from stealing information from a covert lab. After arriving and engaging Belova in combat, two additional covert agents, Ava Starr and Antonia Dreykov arrive and join the melee.

Walker and the others realize that they all work for de Fontaine and have similar orders to kill one another to cover up de Fontaine's illegal activities. Walker, Starr, Belova, and test subject "Bob" escape the lab and a subsequent ambush by de Fontaine's soldiers, where Bob disappears after flying into the air. Regrouping, Walker, Belova, and Starr hitch a ride with Alexei Shostakov, Belova's estranged adopted father and narrowly avoid capture through the intervention of Bucky Barnes. Realizing they have a common goal, the group attempts to arrest de Fontaine. Bob returns, now calling himself "The Sentry", and attacks the group on de Fontaine's orders. Walker defends his teammates throughout the fight, but Bob is too powerful, eventually folding Walker's shield in half and tearing off Bucky's cybernetic arm. Walker carries Bucky to safety and assists in saving civilians as Bob transforms from The Sentry into "The Void," the personification of his traumatized personality. While saving a civilian from falling debris, the others join Walker and regroup to confront The Void. Walker follows Belova into The Void's psychic construct and assists in rescuing Bob's core personality from the Void's control. Once returned to normal, Bob thanks the others for their assistance. Walker joins the others in attempting to arrest de Fontaine but discover that she has convened a press conference. Hailed as heroes, Walker becomes one of the "New Avengers", taking up residence in the former Avengers tower.

As of 2026, the character has appeared in two projects: the Disney+ series The Falcon and the Winter Soldier and the film Thunderbolts*. He will return in the film Avengers: Doomsday. Alternate universe variants of Walker appeared in two projects: the Disney+ animated series What If...? and Marvel Zombies.

=== Jennifer Walters / She-Hulk ===
Jennifer "Jen" Walters (portrayed by Tatiana Maslany) is an attorney at Goodman, Lieber, Kurtzberg & Holliway and former Deputy District Attorney for the City of Los Angeles. After coming into contact with her cousin Bruce Banner's blood, she undergoes a physical transformation similar to his and becomes known as She-Hulk. She is then hired by GLK&H to be the face of their superhuman law division, and later dates Matt Murdock.

As of 2026, the character has appeared in one project: the Disney+ series She-Hulk: Attorney at Law.

==== Walters family ====
Jennifer Walter's family play an important role in her life. Her parents are Morris and Elaine Walters (portrayed by Mark Linn-Baker and Tess Malis Kincaid respectively) and her cousin is Ched (portrayed by Nicholas Cirillo).

As of 2026, these characters have appeared in one project: the Disney+ series She-Hulk: Attorney at Law.

=== Adam Warlock ===
Adam Warlock (portrayed by Will Poulter) is a perfect Sovereign created by Ayesha in order to help her destroy the Guardians of the Galaxy, but has the mentality of a child due to the High Evolutionary forcing Ayesha to bring Adam out prematurely to aid him in capturing Rocket. After the destruction of Counter-Earth, in which his mother is killed, Adam is captured by Gamora and later fails to kill Quill. As the High Evolutionary's ship explodes, Adam is rescued by Groot, and Drax explains that everyone deserves a second chance. Adam subsequently saves Quill's life and awkwardly joins the group hug, later becoming a part of the new Guardians of the Galaxy under the leadership of Rocket.

As of 2026, the character has appeared in one project: the film Guardians of the Galaxy Vol. 3.

=== Natalie Washington / N.A.T.A.L.I.E. ===
Natalie Washington (portrayed by Lyric Ross as an adult and Kent Churchill as a child) is Riri Williams's late best friend that she turns into her in-suit artificial intelligence N.A.T.A.L.I.E., short for Neuro Autonomous Technical Assistant and Laboratory Intelligence Entity.

As of 2026, the character has appeared in one project: the Disney+ series Ironheart.

=== Raza al-Wazar ===
Raza Hamidmi al-Wazar (portrayed by Faran Tahir) is a terrorist leader of the Ten Rings group who kidnap Tony Stark. Outside of his character sharing some characteristics from the comic book character Wong-Chu and referencing the organization that alludes to the Mandarin, Raza is an original character of the MCU. He uses Stark Industries weapons for personal gain, and is responsible for the origin of Stark as Iron Man, as he is the one who abducted him for his self-proclaimed personal gain of taking over the world, citing Genghis Khan as his influence. He is later revealed to be working for Obadiah Stane.

As of 2026, the character has appeared in two projects: the film Iron Man; and the Disney+ series VisionQuest.

=== Nicodemus West ===
Dr. Nicodemus West (portrayed by Michael Stuhlbarg) is a rival surgeon to Stephen Strange.

As of 2026, the character has appeared in two projects: the films Doctor Strange and Doctor Strange in the Multiverse of Madness. An alternate universe variant of West appeared in one project: the Disney+ animated series What If...?.

=== Dane Whitman ===
Dane Whitman (portrayed by Kit Harington) is a human who works at the Natural History Museum in London as a history professor and is dating Sersi.

As of 2026, the character has appeared in one project: the film Eternals.

=== Eric Williams ===
Eric Williams (portrayed by Demetrius Grosse) is the older brother of Simon Williams who works in insurance.

As of 2026, the character has appeared in one project: the Disney+ series Wonder Man (2026–present).

=== Riri Williams / Ironheart ===
Riri Williams (portrayed by Dominique Thorne as an adult and Alyse Elna Lewis as a child), also known as Ironheart, is an MIT student and genius inventor from Chicago who creates a suit of armor that rivals the one built by Tony Stark / Iron Man, and whose vibranium detector is stolen by the CIA, leading to her being hunted down by Talokan and Wakanda. After being expelled from MIT, Williams returns to Chicago where she joins forces with Hood's gang, until she discovers a truth that would lead her to danger and adventure.

As of 2026, the character has appeared in two projects: the film Black Panther: Wakanda Forever; and the Disney+ series Ironheart. Alternate universe variants of Riri appeared in two projects: the Disney+ animated series What If...? and Marvel Zombies.

==== Riri Williams' family ====
Riri Williams' family play an important role in her life. Ronnie Williams (portrayed by Anji White) is Riri's mother, and Gary Williams (portrayed by LaRoyce Hawkins) is Riri's late stepfather.

As of 2026, the characters have appeared in one project: the Disney+ series Ironheart.

=== Simon Williams ===
Simon Williams (portrayed by Yahya Abdul-Mateen II as an adult and Kameron J. Meadows as a child) is an actor with ionic energy-based superpowers, including superhuman strength and the ability to create explosions.

Prior to Abdul-Mateen's casting as Simon, Nathan Fillion had appeared on movie posters as the character in a cut sequence from Guardians of the Galaxy Vol. 2. James Gunn, the director of that film, enjoyed Wonder Man from the comics and felt Fillion could portray the "sometimes douchey actor/superhero" that the character is. Even though the posters were cut from the film, Gunn still considered them to be canon to the MCU.

As of 2026, the character has appeared in one project: the Disney+ series Wonder Man.

==== Simon Williams' family ====
Simon Williams' family plays an important role in his life. Sanford (portrayed by Béchir Sylvain) and Martha Williams (portrayed by Shola Adewusi) are Simon's parents, and Eric Williams is Simon's older brother.

As of 2026, the characters have appeared in one project: the Disney+ series Wonder Man.

=== Andre Wilson ===
Andre Wilson (portrayed by Hannibal Buress), also known as Coach Wilson, is a physical education teacher and detention supervisor at the Midtown School of Science and Technology.

As of 2026, the character has appeared in two projects: the films Spider-Man: Homecoming and Spider-Man: No Way Home.

=== Sarah Wilson ===
Sarah Wilson (portrayed by Adepero Oduye) is the sister of Sam Wilson. She has two sons, AJ (portrayed by Chase River McGhee) and Cass (portrayed by Aaron Haynes), and struggles financially in Sam's absence during the Blip.

As of 2026, the character has appeared in one project: the Disney+ series The Falcon and the Winter Soldier. An alternate universe variant of Sarah appeared in one project: the Disney+ animated series What If...?.

=== Peter Wisdom ===
Peter Wisdom (portrayed by Rob Delaney) is a car salesman alongside Wade Wilson on Earth-10005. He showed up when Deadpool put an ad for X-Force members, and was immediately recruited. He died alongside all the other X-Force members, but Deadpool used time travel to prevent his death.

As of 2026, the character has appeared in one project: the film Deadpool & Wolverine. Delaney reprises his role from 20th Century Fox's X-Men film series.

=== Bentley Wittman ===
As of 2026, an alternate universe variant of Dr. Bentley Wittman has appeared in one project: the Disney+ animated series Your Friendly Neighborhood Spider-Man (voiced by Paul F. Tompkins). Another variant as the Wizard will be introduced in the one-shot comic Fantastic Four: First Foes – The Wizard (2026).

=== W'Kabi ===
W'Kabi (portrayed by Daniel Kaluuya) is the chief of Wakanda's Border Tribe as well as T'Challa's best friend and Okoye's husband. As he is responsible for the borders of Wakanda, W'Kabi and his guards have trained armored white rhinoceroses as shock cavalry. W'Kabi loses faith in T'Challa when he fails to capture Ulysses Klaue (who had killed his parents decades earlier while stealing vibranium), and supports N'Jadaka when he subsequently takes the throne. During the final battle, Okoye confronts W'Kabi when he tries to trample M'Baku with an armored white rhinoceros, saying she values Wakanda more than their love. Not wanting to die by Okoye's hands or take her life, W'Kabi surrenders and the rest of the Border Tribe does the same.

It is revealed in Black Panther: Wakanda Forever that he was banished from the Royal Family's services following the events of the first film for aligning with Killmonger and currently remains in the Border Tribe.

As of 2026, the character has appeared in one project: the film Black Panther.

=== Jimmy Woo ===
James E. "Jimmy" Woo (portrayed by Randall Park) is an FBI agent. In 2016, Woo is assigned to be Scott Lang's parole officer while he is under house arrest for two years. He sees Lang doing the card tricks and becomes interested. In 2023, Woo is called in to investigate a missing persons case in Westview, New Jersey. He works alongside S.W.O.R.D. to investigate Wanda Maximoff's anomaly, teaming up with Monica Rambeau and Darcy Lewis. He is ejected from the base with Rambeau and Lewis after they defended Maximoff. In 2026, Woo has become good friends with Lang.

As of 2026, the character has appeared in three projects: the films Ant-Man and the Wasp and Ant-Man and the Wasp: Quantumania; and the Disney+ series WandaVision. An alternate universe variant of Woo appeared in one project: the Disney+ animated series Marvel Zombies.

=== Alice Wu-Gulliver ===
Alice Wu-Gulliver (portrayed by Ali Ahn) is an ex-police officer and security guard whose mother Lorna Wu (portrayed by Elizabeth Anweis) was a famous singer and witch before dying in a hotel fire while on tour. Additionally, Alice is portrayed with having black hair with red highlights. Alice joined Agatha Harkness's coven to walk the Witches' Road, suggesting that she might learn the truth of what happened to her mother. In the third trial, she dies after her magic is absorbed by a possessed Agatha and her soul is now claimed by Rio Vidal / Death, who told her that she died trying to save Harkness.

As of 2026, the character has appeared in one project: the Disney+ series Agatha All Along.

== X ==
=== Charles Xavier / Professor X ===
Charles Xavier (portrayed by Christopher Abbott), also known as Professor X, is a telepathic mutant and founder of the X-Men who is paraplegic and uses a wheelchair. He advocates for peaceful coexistence between mutants and humans.

On Earth-838, Charles Xavier (portrayed by Patrick Stewart) is the leader of the Illuminati, a group of enhanced individuals that monitors the multiverse for threats. He and the group hold Stephen Strange accountable for his actions against the multiverse, with Xavier advocating Strange to be spared, before they are interrupted by the Wanda Maximoff of Earth-616, who has possessed her Earth-838 counterpart. While Maximoff massacres the Illuminati, Xavier encourages Strange to locate the Book of Vishanti, locked away by 838-Strange before his death, to use it against Maximoff, before telepathically taking over her mind to try to communicate with and free her Earth-838 counterpart. Maximoff takes back control and subsequently kills Xavier by twisting his head off, the psychic shock of which kills him in the real world, leading Xavier to drop dead in his chair.

The character will be introduced in the upcoming film X-Men. An alternate universe variant of Xavier appeared in one project: the film Doctor Strange in the Multiverse of Madness. Another variant will appear in the film Avengers: Doomsday. Stewart previously portrayed a different version of Xavier in 20th Century Fox's X-Men film series.

=== Xu Wenwu ===
Xu Wenwu (Chinese: 徐文武; pinyin: Xú Wénwǔ; portrayed by Tony Leung) is the legendary founder and supreme leader of the Ten Rings criminal organization, and is the father of Shang-Chi in place of Fu Manchu / Zheng Zu from Marvel Comics. Wenwu is the enigmatic and feared leader of the Ten Rings criminal organization, the father of Shang-Chi and Xialing and implied to be Genghis Khan. He utilizes the legendary Ten Rings — a set of ten mystical iron rings that grant him immortality and unimaginable power. The Ten Rings terrorist group was previously referenced in the Iron Man trilogy and Ant-Man. He attempted to find the legendary village Ta Lo, being encountered at the mystical gate by its protector, Ying Li, whom he fell in love with. He took her back to his home and started a family, having a son, Shang-Chi and daughter, Xialing. He also abandoned both his rings and organization, but after the rival Iron Gang murdered Li, he vengefully massacred them and meticulously trained Shang-Chi in combat, sending him to kill the Iron Gang's leader. Shang-Chi runs away to San Francisco, while Xialing escapes a few years later to Macau.

In the present-day, Wenwu is haunted with his wife's death and begins hearing her voice calling out to him from Ta Lo, which he believes imprisoned her in a cave. He sends his forces after both his children to retrieve their pendants, which point the way towards Ta Lo. He organizes his army to attack Ta Lo and open the cave which, unbeknownst to him, contains the Dweller-in-Darkness, a demon that has been impersonating Li's voice so Wenwu will release him. He arrives and proceeds to break the Dweller's seal until he is confronted by Shang-Chi, whom he battles until the Dweller breaks free. Realizing he had been tricked, a remorseful Wenwu saves Shang-Chi from the Dweller and bequeaths his Ten Rings to him before the Dweller kills him by consuming his soul.

As of 2026, the character has appeared in one project: the film Shang-Chi and the Legend of the Ten Rings. Alternate universe variants of Wenwu (voiced by Feodor Chin) appeared in two projects: the Disney+ animated series What If...? and Marvel Zombies.

=== Xu Xialing ===
Xu Xialing (Chinese: 徐夏靈; pinyin: Xú Xiàlíng; portrayed by Meng'er Zhang) is Shang-Chi's sister. After escaping the Ten Rings, Xialing establishes an underground fight club in Macau called the Golden Daggers Club which is frequented by Wong, Abomination, the Black Widow Helen, and an unnamed Extremis soldier. During the Ten Rings raid on the Golden Daggers Club where they targeted her pendant, Xialing is captured along with her brother and Katy by Wenwu when he breaks up the fight. She escapes from the Ten Rings compound with them, Trevor Slattery, and Morris the Hundun to Ta Lo. Xialing helps defend the village from the Ten Rings and later the Dweller-in-Darkness. After Wenwu's death, Xialing is advised by Shang-Chi to disband the Ten Rings. Unbeknownst to Shang-Chi, Xialing actually became the new leader of the Ten Rings and restructures it to include female fighters.

She is partially inspired by Sasha Hammer, Zheng Bao Yu and Sister Dagger from the comic books.

As of 2026, the character has appeared in one project: the film Shang-Chi and the Legend of the Ten Rings. An alternate universe variant of Xialing as The Hood appeared in one project: the Disney+ animated series What If...?.

== Y ==
=== Ying Li ===
Ying Li (portrayed by Fala Chen) is a guardian of Ta Lo, a mystical realm inhabited by Chinese mythological creatures, including its guardian dragon, the Great Protector, who blesses Li with the power to manipulate wind. In 1996, the immortal warlord Xu Wenwu attempts to invade Ta Lo but is defeated by Li. The two fall in love but when Wenwu is rejected by Ta Lo's inhabitants for his dark past, Li leaves with him. The two marry and have two children: a son, Shang-Chi, and a daughter, Xialing. Wenwu abandons his Ten Rings organization and its weapons while Li forgoes the blessing of the Great Protector to be with each other and their children. While Wenwu is away, Li is murdered by the Iron Gang, old enemies of the Ten Rings. Li's death prompts Wenwu to violently murder the gang in retaliation and reverts to his dark ways by reclaiming his Rings and organization. Years later, the Dweller-in-Darkness uses Li's voice to make Wenwu believe that his wife is still alive and trapped within a gate in Ta Lo, so that Wenwu can use his Rings to destroy its seal. Wenwu attempts to convince his estranged children to help him free their mother and destroy her village in retaliation for imprisoning her, but the two side with Li's people. Shang-Chi and Xialing are gifted suits of armor crafted from the Great Protector's scales that Li entrusted to her sister Ying Nan. After the battle, Shang-Chi and Xialing light paper lanterns in memory of Li and Wenwu, who was killed by the Dweller.

Refinery29 reviewer Leah Marilla Thomas praised this adaptation of Shang-Chi's mother for the "mythical (and devastatingly romantic) backstory", which makes her a "real character" as compared to the brief appearances of the earlier comics version.

As of 2026, the character has appeared in one project: the film Shang-Chi and the Legend of the Ten Rings. The character's name in the film was initially announced as Jiang Li, which was used on licensed products, but was changed to Ying Li. The name Jiang Li was repurposed when the character was integrated into the mainstream Marvel Universe as Shang-Chi's real mother in the comics.

=== Ying Nan ===
Ying Nan (portrayed by Michelle Yeoh) is a guardian of Ta Lo, Li's sister, and Shang-Chi and Xialing's aunt. Nan gives her nephew and niece suits of armor crafted from dragon scales and mentors Shang-Chi in the fighting style of Ta Lo. Nan leads the defense of Ta Lo against the Ten Rings and later the Dweller-in-Darkness.

As of 2026, the character has appeared in one project: the film Shang-Chi and the Legend of the Ten Rings. An alternate universe variant of Ying Nan (voiced by Michelle Wong) appeared in one project: the Disney+ animated series What If...?. Yeoh previously portrayed Aleta Ogord in the film Guardians of the Galaxy Vol. 2.

=== Ho Yinsen ===
Dr. Ho Yinsen (portrayed by Shaun Toub) is an engineer who helps save Tony Stark's life by creating an electromagnet which keeps shrapnel from his heart. He later helps Stark build an armor to escape from the terrorists who kidnapped them both. He then sacrifices his life to let Stark escape, with his last words being "don't waste your life, Stark".

As of 2026, the character has appeared in two projects: the films Iron Man and Iron Man 3 (cameo).

=== Yon-Rogg ===
Yon-Rogg (portrayed by Jude Law) is the leader of Starforce, and leads the war against the Skrulls. While hunting down former Kree scientist Mar-Vell, he encounters Carol Danvers, who destroys an energy core that imbues her with powers. Yon-Rogg takes her back to Hala, gives Danvers a blood transfusion with his blood to save her life, and has her memories altered to think that she is a Kree named Vers. He mentors and trains her to be a soldier, but during an operation she is separated from the rest of the Starforce and lands on Earth. Yon-Rogg goes after her, only to discover that Danvers has switched sides after the Skrull Talos helped her recover her memories. Starforce captures Danvers, Talos, and a group of Skrull refugees, but Danvers manages to break free of Yon-Rogg and the Supreme Intelligence's hold over her by unlocking her full potential to drive back and defeat several members of the Starforce. Yon-Rogg requests assistance from Ronan the Accuser, but his assault on Earth is thwarted by Danvers. In their final confrontation, Danvers defeats Yon-Rogg. Afterwards, she sends him back to Hala to deliver her message to the Supreme Intelligence.

As of 2026, the character has appeared in one project: the film Captain Marvel. An alternate universe variant of Rogg appeared in one project: the Disney+ animated series What If...?.

=== Yukio ===
Yukio (portrayed by Shioli Kutsuna) is Negasonic Teenage Warhead's girlfriend and fellow X-Men member on Earth-10005.

As of 2026, the character has appeared in one project: the film Deadpool & Wolverine. Kutsuna reprises her role from 20th Century Fox's X-Men film series.

== Z ==
=== Helmut Zemo ===
Baron Helmut Zemo (portrayed by Daniel Brühl) is a wealthy baron of the Sokovian royal family who served as colonel of an elite Sokovian commando unit and blamed the Avengers for their role in his family's deaths during their battle with Ultron, developing a hatred towards enhanced individuals in general. In 2016, after learning of a facility holding Hydra's Winter Soldier project and the footage of Bucky Barnes murdering Tony Stark's parents, Zemo frames Barnes by bombing the signing of the Sokovia Accords in Vienna to acquire the facility's location and then lure Stark and Steve Rogers so he can have them destroy each other. Achieving his goal of effectively fracturing the Avengers, Zemo attempts to commit suicide but is stopped by T'Challa and taken into custody by the authorities. Everett K. Ross supervises his incarceration where he mocks Zemo for failing in his efforts, but Zemo indicates otherwise. In 2024, he escapes with the help of Barnes and allies with him and Sam Wilson against the Flag Smashers for his own agenda. Though later recaptured by the Dora Milaje and sent to the Raft, Zemo arranges the murder of arrested members of the Flag Smashers through his butler to minimize the chance of their Super-Soldier enhancements being reproduced.

As of 2026, the character has appeared in two projects: the film Captain America: Civil War; and the Disney+ series The Falcon and the Winter Soldier. An alternate universe variant of Zemo (voiced by Rama Vallury) appeared in one project: the Disney+ animated series Marvel Zombies.

=== Zeus ===
Zeus (portrayed by Russell Crowe) is the king of the Olympians, based on the Greek mythological deity of the same name. Zeus heads the Council of Godheads in Omnipotence City, but is demonstrated by Thor to be an apathetic fool obsessed with orgies when he wouldn't come up with a solution to deal with Gorr the God Butcher while claiming that the Gods that Gorr the God Butcher killed were "lesser gods". In anger, Zeus turns his lightning bolt on the group, breaking Korg's body before Thor slings the bolt back through Zeus's chest, seemingly killing him. Valkyrie takes the bolt to fight Gorr. Zeus is revealed to have survived in the mid-credits scene, sending his son Hercules to strike fear into the hearts of men again and deal with Thor.

There were some deleted scenes before the above scene was filmed that showed Zeus to be more helpful to Thor as he shows up at the hospice where Jane Foster is at, tells Thor how the Thunderbolt works, and to find the Gates of Eternity.

As of 2026, the character has appeared in one project: the film Thor: Love and Thunder. An alternate universe variant of Zeus (voiced by Darin De Paul) appeared in one project: Disney+ animated series What If...?.

=== Arnim Zola ===
Dr. Arnim Zola (portrayed by Toby Jones) is a scientist working for Hydra and the Red Skull before getting captured and recruited into S.H.I.E.L.D. Zola masterminds Hydra's infiltration within S.H.I.E.L.D.'s infrastructure before a terminal illness in the 1970s leads to him transferring his consciousness into a computer system in Camp Lehigh. In 2014, his computer consciousness distracts Steve Rogers and Natasha Romanoff long enough for the camp to be wiped out by a missile barrage from Hydra.

In an alternate universe, Zola is captured by Captain Peggy Carter, who became a super-soldier instead of Steve Rogers. In another universe, a copy of Zola's consciousness is recovered by Natasha Romanoff to stop her universe's Ultron. It is hinted Zola has digital copies of his mind stored in other Hydra bases. Despite his initial failure to overwrite Ultron's A.I., Zola acquires the android's body in his second attempt and battles Killmonger for the Infinity Stones before the two are trapped in a pocket dimension by Stephen Strange Supreme and the Watcher.

As of 2026, the character has appeared in three projects: the films Captain America: The First Avenger and Captain America: The Winter Soldier; and the Marvel Television series Agent Carter. Alternate universe variants of Zola appeared in one project: the Disney+ animated series What If...?.

=== Zuri ===
Zuri (portrayed by Forest Whitaker as an adult, Denzel Whitaker as a young man) is a former member of the War Dogs and a Wakandan shaman, and the trusted loyal adviser to his King. As a young man, Zuri posed as an American named James to tail N'Jobu, T'Chaka's brother and a traitor, and witnessed his death at T'Chaka's hands in 1992. In 2016, Zuri appoints T'Chaka's son T'Challa as the new king, and oversees T'Challa's fight with M'Baku on challenge day by administering the liquid that removes the abilities the heart-shaped herb grants. When M'Baku is defeated, Zuri performs a ritual that involves the abilities' return. Zuri is the one to tell T'Challa the truth about N'Jobu. N'Jadaka later kills Zuri when he attempts to protect T'Challa, blaming him for doing nothing to protect N'Jobu.

As of 2026, the character has appeared in one project: the film Black Panther.

== See also ==
- Characters of the Marvel Cinematic Universe: A–L
- Features of the Marvel Cinematic Universe
- Species of the Marvel Cinematic Universe
- Teams and organizations of the Marvel Cinematic Universe
