= Bad Men Must Bleed =

- Release poster
- Directed by: Micah Lyons
- Written by: Micah Lyons
- Produced by: Micah Lyons; Chris Routhe
- Starring: Todd Terry; Chris Routhe; Chad Michael Murray; Lexi Rabe; Willie Robertson; Melanie Martyn; Brad Leland; Bruce Dern; Isaac C. Singleton Jr.; Brooke Lyons
- Cinematography: James Burgess
- Edited by: J.C. Doler
- Music by: Erick Schroder
- Production companies: Breath of Life Productions; Routhe Productions
- Distributed by: Vantage Media
- Release date: October 7, 2025 (VOD)
- Running time: 112 minutes
- Country: United States
- Language: English

Bad Men Must Bleed is a 2025 American western drama film written and directed by Micah Lyons.

The film was released on video on demand on October 7, 2025.

== Synopsis ==
Follows a man as he hunts his brother's gang across the old west to stop their rampage.

== Cast ==
- Todd Terry as Adam
- Chris Routhe as Harrison Griggs
- Chad Michael Murray as Jacob Wallace
- Lexi Rabe as Emma Wallace
- Willie Robertson as Leon
- Melanie Martyn as Penny
- Brad Leland as Uncle Fletch
- Bruce Dern as George Wells
- Isaac C. Singleton Jr. as Brighton
- Brooke Lyons as Sarah Wallace

== Production ==
Principal photography had been completed by December 2020, with Micah Lyons writing and directing. Todd Terry, Chris Routhe, Chad Michael Murray, Lexi Rabe, Willie Robertson, Melanie Martyn, Brad Leland, Bruce Dern, Isaac C. Singleton Jr., and Brooke Lyons rounded out the cast.

== Release ==
Bad Men Must Bleed was released on video on demand on October 7, 2025.

== Reception ==
James S. Pope of Vocal Media noted the film stands out as a gritty, unapologetically raw film that pays homage to the golden age of revenge cinema while carving out its own identity.
