= Lexi Rabe =

American child actress (born 2012)

- Born: June 15, 2012 (age 14); Los Angeles, California, U.S.
- Occupation: Actress
- Years active: 2019–present
- Notable work: Avengers: Endgame
- Parents: Joshua Rabe (father); Jessica Rabe (mother)
- Relatives: Elizabeth Hemmingsen (half-sister); Logan Rabe (brother)

Alexandra Rachael "Lexi" Rabe (born June 15, 2012) is an American child actress. She is known for playing Morgan Stark in the 2019 film Avengers: Endgame, which was her film debut.

== Early life ==
Lexi Rabe was born in Los Angeles, California, to Joshua Rabe, and Jessica Rabe, an American actress, writer, director, and producer. She has an older half-sister, Elizabeth Hemmingsen, and a younger brother, Logan.

== Career ==
Rabe's first onscreen role was in the 2019 superhero film Avengers: Endgame, as Morgan Stark, the daughter of Tony Stark / Iron Man and Pepper Potts. Her interest in acting came from a very young age, auditioning for Godzilla: King of the Monsters and Endgame when she was only five years old.

In April 2019, Rabe signed with The Green Room Management for representation. In June 2019, Rabe was cast as Edie Bowden in Silk Road, which was released on February 19, 2021.

Subsequently, Rabe was cast in Letters At Christmas, which was released on November 26, 2024, and as Emma in Bad Men Must Bleed, which was released on October 7, 2025.

== Filmography ==
=== Film ===
Key
†	Denotes films that have not yet been released

Year	Title	Role	Notes
2019	Avengers: Endgame	Morgan Stark	
2019	Godzilla: King of the Monsters	Young Madison Russell	
2021	Silk Road	Edie Bowden	
2021	All Things Hidden in Fiabia	Aurora	Voice role
2021	Spider-Man: No Way Home	Morgan Stark	Deleted scenes
2024	Letters At Christmas	Young Laura Flynn	
2025	Bad Men Must Bleed	Emma Wallace	
TBA	Wishes †	Ava	Post-production

=== Television ===
Key
†	Denotes films that have not yet been released

Year	Title	Role	Notes
2020	Stargirl	LeeAnne	Episode: "Stars & S.T.R.I.P.E. Part Two"
2023	Dhar Mann	Jada	Episode: "10-Year-Old ONLY BUYS Designer, She Instantly Regrets It"
