= Marvel Cinematic Universe: Phase Six =

2025–2027 group of superhero media

Phase Six
- Based on: Characters published by Marvel Comics
- Produced by: Kevin Feige; Amy Pascal (BND); Avi Arad (BND); Rachel O'Connor (BND); Louis D'Esposito (A:D); Jonathan Schwartz (A:D)
- Starring: See below
- Production companies: Marvel Studios; Columbia Pictures (BND); Pascal Pictures (BND); Marvel Studios Animation (animated series); Proximity Media (EoW)
- Distributed by: Walt Disney Studios Motion Pictures; Sony Pictures Releasing (BND); Disney Platform Distribution (TV series and specials)
- Release date: 2025–2027
- Country: United States
- Language: English
- Budget: Total (2 films): $0.425 billion
- Box office: Total (2 films): $3.027 billion

Marvel Cinematic Universe Phases
- The Infinity Saga; Phase One (2008–2012); Phase Two (2013–2015); Phase Three (2016–2019)
- The Multiverse Saga; Phase Four (2021–2022); Phase Five (2023–2025); Phase Six (2025–2027)

Phase Six of the Marvel Cinematic Universe (MCU) is a group of American superhero films and television series produced by Marvel Studios based on characters that appear in publications by Marvel Comics. The MCU is the shared universe in which all of the films and series are set. The phase includes television series produced by Marvel Studios and Marvel Studios Animation for the streaming service Disney+, as well as a television special marketed as a "Marvel Television Special Presentation". The phase began with the film The Fantastic Four: First Steps in July 2025 and is set to end with the film Avengers: Secret Wars in December 2027. Phases Four, Five, and Six make up "The Multiverse Saga" storyline.

Kevin Feige is producing every film in the phase, with Amy Pascal, Avi Arad, and Rachel O'Connor also producing Spider-Man: Brand New Day (2026)—a co-production between Marvel Studios and Columbia Pictures—and Marvel Studios executives Louis D'Esposito and Jonathan Schwartz also producing the crossover film Avengers: Doomsday (2026). The films star Pedro Pascal as Reed Richards / Mister Fantastic in First Steps and Tom Holland as Peter Parker / Spider-Man in Brand New Day. Many actors from previous Marvel projects return for Doomsday and Secret Wars. Walt Disney Studios Motion Pictures is distributing the films except for Brand New Day, which was released by Sony Pictures Releasing. The phase's films have grossed over US$3 billion at the global box office.

The phase's series are released under different labels: "Marvel Animation" for the animated series; "Marvel Spotlight" for the more standalone series Wonder Man (2026); and "Marvel Television" for other live-action series. The television series star ensemble casts for the animated miniseries Eyes of Wakanda (2025) and the first season of the animated series Marvel Zombies and its continuation special Marvel Zombies: The Winter Soldier (2025–27), Yahya Abdul-Mateen II as Simon Williams / Wonder Man in Wonder Man, Charlie Cox as Matt Murdock / Daredevil in the second and third seasons of Daredevil: Born Again (2026–27), Paul Bettany as Vision in VisionQuest (2026), and Hudson Thames as Peter Parker / Spider-Man in the second season of the animated Your Friendly Neighborhood Spider-Man (2027).

In addition to the feature films and television series, the phase also includes the television special The Punisher: One Last Kill (2026) starring Jon Bernthal as Frank Castle / Punisher, along with some tie-in comic books. Avengers: Endgame (2019) was re-released in 2026 as Avengers Endgame: Encore, featuring new footage that connects to Doomsday. Additionally, the second and third seasons of the Marvel Studios Animation series X-Men '97 are being released on Disney+ alongside Phase Six as part of the Multiverse Saga.

== Development ==
By April 2014, Marvel Studios president Kevin Feige said that additional storylines for their media franchise and shared universe, the Marvel Cinematic Universe (MCU), were planned through 2028. During Marvel Studios' panel at San Diego Comic-Con in July 2019, Feige announced several films and Disney+ television series in development for Phase Four of the MCU, before revealing the film Blade and a Fantastic Four film were also in development. After the panel, Feige confirmed that Blade was not part of the Phase Four slate at the time, and that what was announced was the full Phase Four slate at that point, despite Marvel already developing further projects at that time. Fantastic Four was formally confirmed in December 2020; the film was believed to be a part of Phase Four at that time.

By June 2021, in addition to What If...?, Marvel Studios was developing a slate of at least three more animated series. During the Disney+ Day event in November 2021, Marvel Studios announced the What If...? spin-off series Marvel Zombies. By the end of November 2021, producer Amy Pascal said that Marvel Studios was planning at least three more Spider-Man films starring Tom Holland with Sony Pictures after Spider-Man: No Way Home (2021), and the following month, Marvel Studios and Sony were actively beginning to develop the story for the fourth MCU Spider-Man film. Also in December, Destin Daniel Cretton was revealed to be developing a comedy series through his company Family Owned, as part of his overall deal with Marvel Studios to develop television projects for the studio for Disney+ in addition to returning to write and direct a sequel to Shang-Chi and the Legend of the Ten Rings (2021). In April 2022, Feige said he and Marvel Studios were on a creative retreat to plan and discuss the MCU films for the following 10 years, and in June 2022, said information on the next saga of the MCU would be provided in the following months, with Marvel Studios being a "little more direct" on their future plans to provide audiences with "the bigger picture [so they] can see a tiny, tiny bit more of the roadmap" following the clues included during Phase Four. Cretton's series was also revealed to be Wonder Man that month.

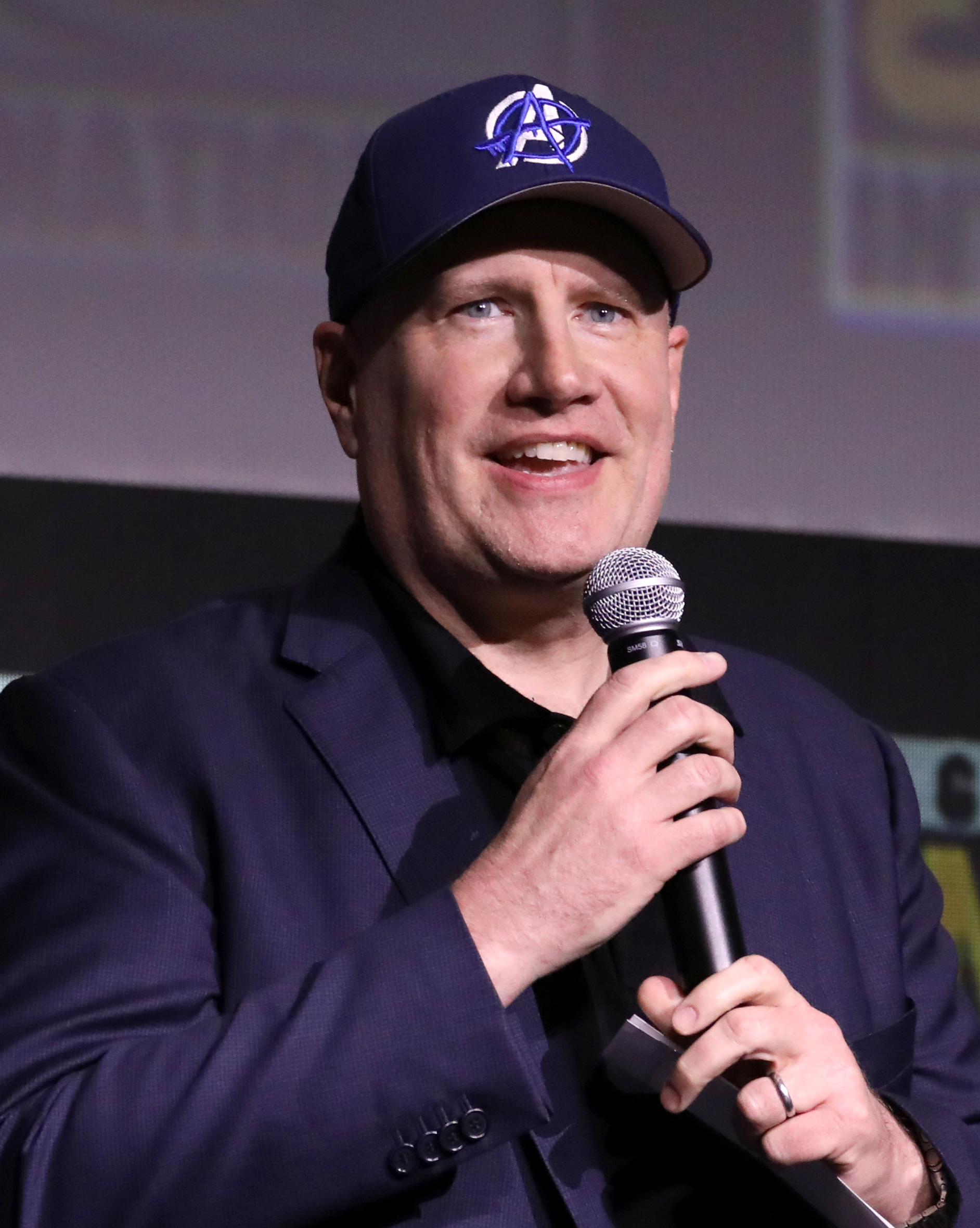
Kevin Feige at the 2024 San Diego Comic-Con, where he provided updates for some Phase Six films

At Marvel Studios' San Diego Comic-Con panel in July 2022, Feige announced that Fantastic Four would be the first film of Phase Six. He also announced that the phase would conclude with two ensemble films, Avengers: The Kang Dynasty and Avengers: Secret Wars, both to be released in 2025, and that Phase Six, along with Phase Four and Phase Five, would be part of "The Multiverse Saga". The films were respectively inspired by "Kang Dynasty", a 2001 comic book storyline written by Kurt Busiek in which Kang the Conqueror travels through time to enslave humanity, and Secret Wars, the name of a 1984–85 comic written by Jim Shooter and a 2015–16 comic written by Jonathan Hickman that both follow various Marvel characters who converge on the planet Battleworld. Feige noted that while not all projects in Phase Six or the previous two phases would directly tie into the larger multiverse storyline, the various storylines that would weave together leading into Secret Wars was "a whole new aspect to the MCU". At the panel, Feige also confirmed the film Blade for Phase Five. Following Marvel Studios' SDCC panel, Disney announced a third season of What If...? and a second season of Your Friendly Neighborhood Spider-Man, then titled Spider-Man: Sophomore Year. In October, Marvel Studios delayed Blade to September 2024 and pushed back the releases of Fantastic Four and Avengers: Secret Wars as a result. In early February 2023, Disney CEO Bob Iger announced that the company would be re-evaluating the volume of content it outputs as a way to cut costs over the next few years. Shortly after, when reflecting on the amount of Disney+ content released for Phase Four in a short time frame, Feige anticipated that Marvel Studios would look to space out the releases of the Disney+ series in Phase Five and Six or put fewer out each year "so they can each get a chance to shine".

The start of the 2023 Writers Guild of America strike in May 2023 was not expected to impact the MCU projects in production, or preparing to begin production, at that time, namely Wonder Man and Fantastic Four, with Marvel Studios reportedly planning to shoot what they could during principal photography and make any necessary writing adjustments during each project's already scheduled reshoots. Production on Wonder Man was shut down by the end of the month, with plans to resume filming when the strike concluded. In June, Disney delayed Fantastic Four to May 2, 2025, Avengers: The Kang Dynasty to May 1, 2026, and Avengers: Secret Wars to May 7, 2027, in part due to the writers' strike and Disney's intentions to improve the quality of MCU content from writing through post-production, after disappointing reception and lower box office earnings for several recently released films following the COVID-19 pandemic. The following month, Iger stated the company would be reducing spending and creation of Marvel content, admitting that Marvel Studios' expansion into Disney+ series and more films had "diluted focus and attention" after a number of underachieving films at the box office in Phases Four and Five. In early September 2023, Marvel Studios announced Wonder Man had an undetermined release, due to the 2023 Hollywood labor disputes and a desire to slow down their content output and make each of their titles "an event".

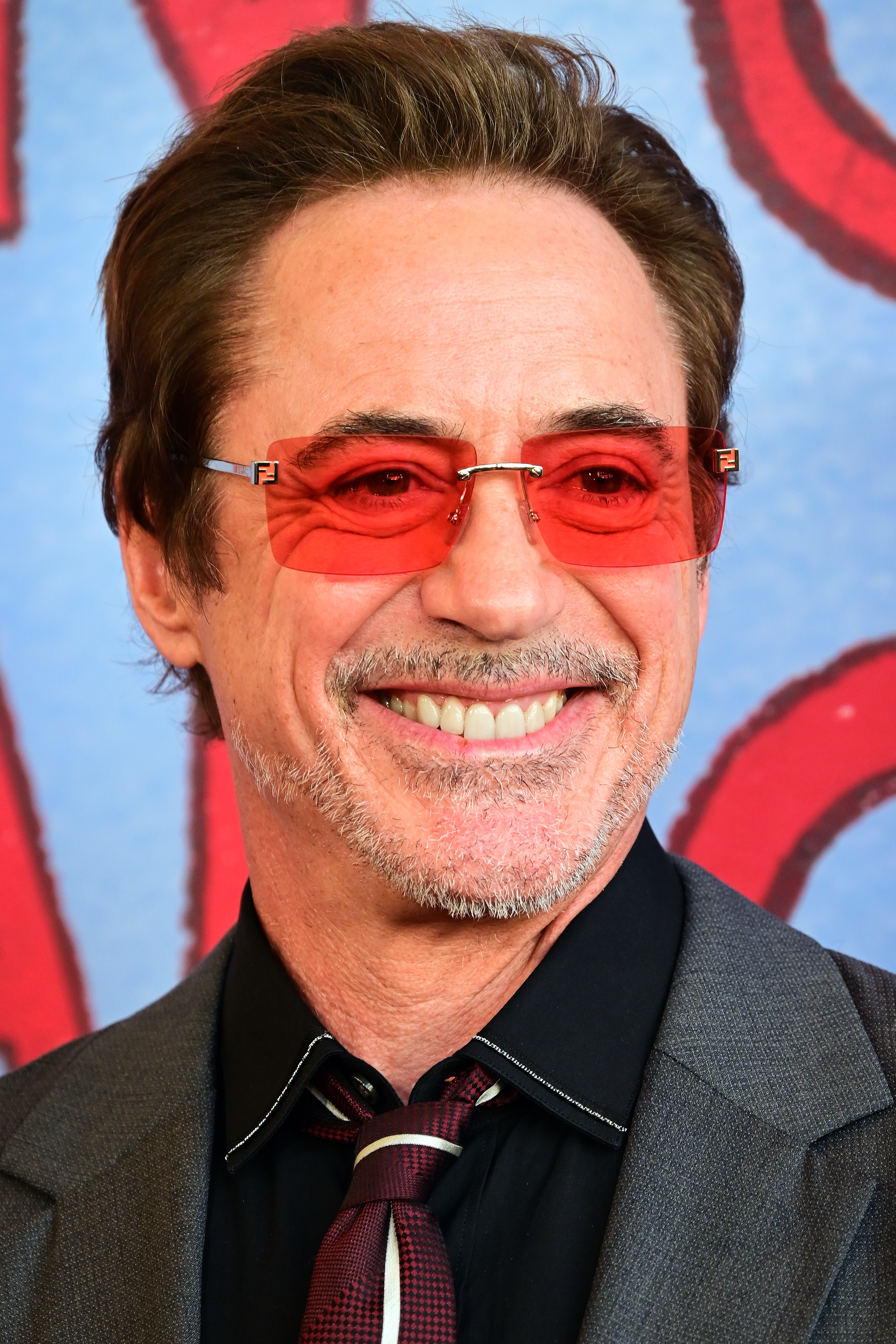
Robert Downey Jr. (pictured in 2026) stars as Doctor Doom in Avengers: Doomsday and Secret Wars, after playing Tony Stark / Iron Man in the Infinity Saga

When the 2023 SAG-AFTRA strike ended that November, Disney delayed several films to accommodate the resumption of production, including moving Blade to November 7, 2025, making it part of the Phase Six slate. Also that month, it was reported that Marvel Studios executives had discussed potentially bringing back the original Avengers cast, including Robert Downey Jr. as Tony Stark / Iron Man, as well as alternative plans for the Multiverse Saga due to Kang the Conqueror actor Jonathan Majors's legal issues surrounding assault allegations from earlier that year, including pivoting to focus on another comic book antagonist such as Doctor Doom. The following month, Disney and Marvel Studios fired Majors after he was found guilty of harassment and reckless assault in the third degree. His character had been set to be the main antagonist of the Multiverse Saga, particularly The Kang Dynasty. By then, Marvel Studios had begun to internally refer to that film as Avengers 5. Additionally, Marvel Studios Animation announced the series Eyes of Wakanda, which was planned to be released in 2024. Fantastic Four was retitled The Fantastic Four in February 2024, when its release date was moved to July 25, 2025, swapping with the Phase Five film Thunderbolts*.

In May 2024, Iger said Disney planned to release two, or at most three, Marvel films and two Marvel series a year moving forward. This was down from up to four films and around four series being released in some recent years, and was part of the company's larger strategy to reduce its content output and focus on quality; at that time, four films were still planned to be released in 2026. He said Marvel content would continue to balance sequels with new franchises. Later that month, VisionQuest, a spin-off series from WandaVision (2021) centered on the character Vision, was revealed to be in development for release in 2026; it concludes a trilogy of series that includes WandaVision and Agatha All Along (2024), and was previously being developed by those series' creator Jac Schaeffer. In July 2024, The Fantastic Four was further retitled The Fantastic Four: First Steps, while Avengers 5 was titled Avengers: Doomsday along with the announcement of Downey playing a new villain, Victor von Doom / Doctor Doom, in that film and Secret Wars.

At Disney's D23 convention in August 2024, Feige confirmed that Daredevil: Born Again would have a second season, which would consist of eight episodes carried over from the originally announced 18-episode first season following the series' creative overhaul. In October, Disney removed Blade from its release calendar, while Sony scheduled Spider-Man: Brand New Day for release on July 24, 2026. This filled a date that Disney had previously scheduled for an unspecified Marvel Studios film. Later that month, Marvel Studios announced the release dates for their Disney+ projects through the end of 2024 and 2025, including Eyes of Wakanda, Marvel Zombies, and Wonder Man. In February 2025, Sony pushed the release of the fourth Spider-Man film back a week to July 31, 2026, while a Special Presentation television special starring Jon Bernthal as Frank Castle / Punisher, The Punisher: One Last Kill, was revealed to be in development for release in May 2026, following the release of Born Again season 2 from March to May 2026. In May 2025, Disney delayed the release of Doomsday and Secret Wars to December 18, 2026, and December 17, 2027, respectively, to allow more time for production to be completed. In September 2025, Born Again was renewed for a third and final season, and the next month, Wonder Man was pushed back to January 2026.

Ahead of the start of Phase Six with the release of First Steps in July 2025, Feige called Phase Six "the most focused phase" after Phases Four and Five were used by Marvel Studios to "experiment". He explained, "We used it to evolve and then we used it to expand – too much. Secret Wars, as in the comics, is as much about bringing certain storylines to a close as it is about launching a new one, and that's what's very exciting."

== Films ==
Phase Six films
Film	U.S. release date	Directed by	Screenplay by	Produced by	Status
The Fantastic Four: First Steps	July 25, 2025	Matt Shakman	Josh Friedman and Eric Pearson and Jeff Kaplan & Ian Springer	Kevin Feige	Released
Spider-Man: Brand New Day	July 31, 2026	Destin Daniel Cretton	Chris McKenna & Erik Sommers	Kevin Feige, Amy Pascal, Avi Arad, and Rachel O'Connor	Released
Avengers: Doomsday	December 18, 2026	Anthony and Joe Russo	Stephen McFeely and Michael Waldron	Kevin Feige, Louis D'Esposito, and Jonathan Schwartz	Post-production
Avengers: Secret Wars	December 17, 2027	Anthony and Joe Russo	Michael Waldron and Stephen McFeely and Chris McKenna & Erik Sommers	Kevin Feige, Louis D'Esposito, and Jonathan Schwartz	Pre-production

=== The Fantastic Four: First Steps (2025) ===
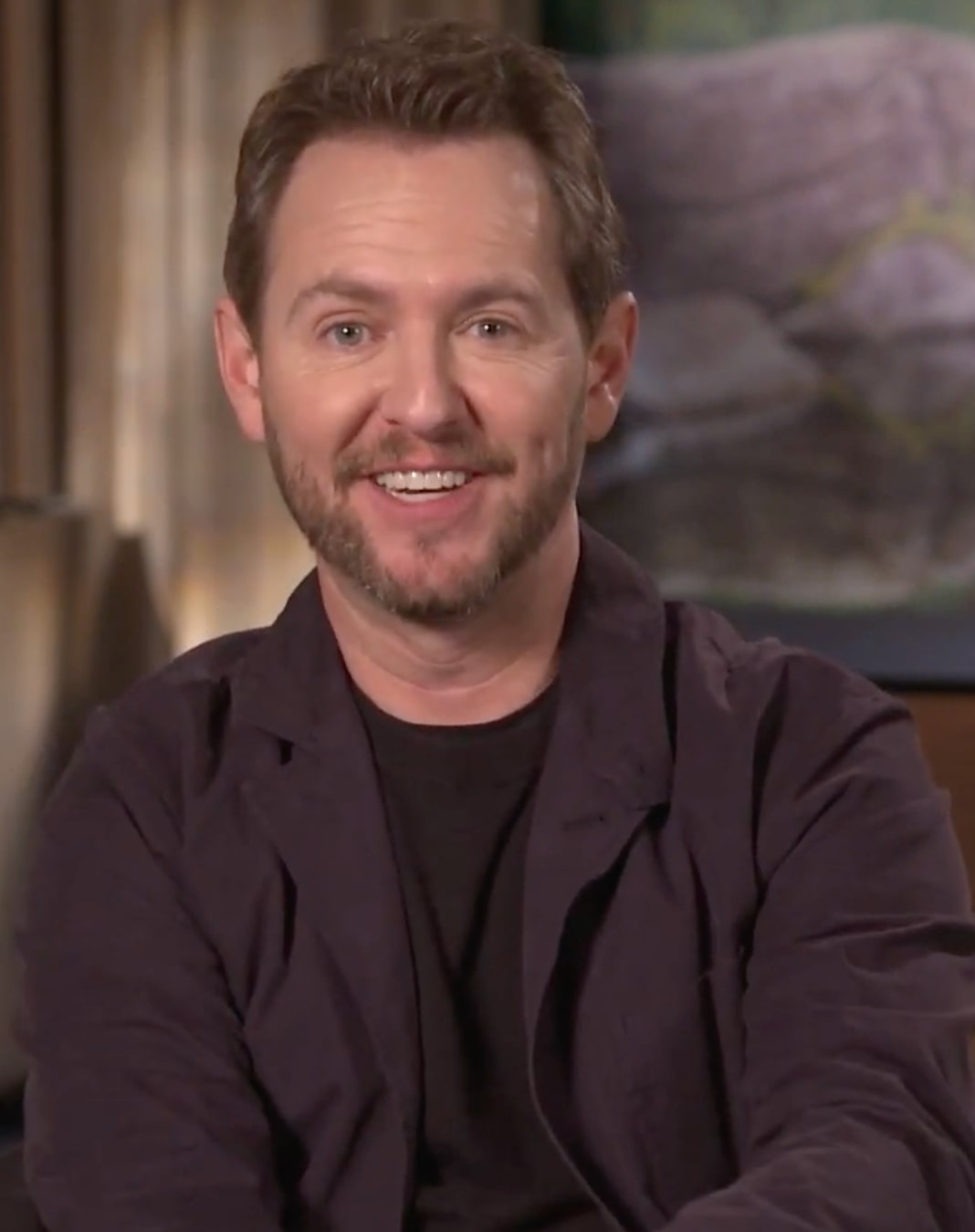
Matt Shakman, director of The Fantastic Four: First Steps and WandaVision (2021)

The Fantastic Four must protect their 1960s-inspired retro-futuristic world from the planet-devouring cosmic being Galactus.

Marvel Studios president Kevin Feige said they were developing an MCU Fantastic Four film in July 2019. Jon Watts was announced as the director in December 2020, but he stepped down in April 2022. Matt Shakman took over as director that September, when Jeff Kaplan and Ian Springer were writing the script. Josh Friedman was rewriting the script by March 2023, with Eric Pearson also contributing to it. Friedman, Pearson, Kaplan, and Springer were all credited for the film's screenplay, with Pearson, Kaplan, Springer, and Kat Wood receiving story credits. The titular team's cast was confirmed in February 2024, consisting of Pedro Pascal as Reed Richards / Mister Fantastic, Vanessa Kirby as Sue Storm / Invisible Woman, Joseph Quinn as Johnny Storm / Human Torch, and Ebon Moss-Bachrach as Ben Grimm / The Thing. The title was announced at the end of July 2024, when filming began at Pinewood Studios in England, and wrapped at the end of November. The Fantastic Four: First Steps premiered at the Dorothy Chandler Pavilion on July 21, 2025, and was released in the United States on July 25.

The Fantastic Four: First Steps is set on Earth-828, an alternate universe from the main MCU "Sacred Timeline", in 1964. Because of this, Shakman said there would be no "Easter eggs" to the larger MCU. Robert Downey Jr. makes a cameo appearance as Victor von Doom / Doctor Doom in the mid-credits scene.

=== Spider-Man: Brand New Day (2026) ===
Peter Parker anonymously protects New York City as the hero Spider-Man and investigates a powerful new threat while his superpowers undergo a surprising and potentially dangerous evolution.

A fourth MCU Spider-Man film was reportedly in development by August 2019 alongside Spider-Man: No Way Home (2021). By December 2021, Sony and Marvel Studios planned to make at least three more films, including the fourth, starring Tom Holland as Peter Parker / Spider-Man. Chris McKenna and Erik Sommers began writing the script in February 2023, but work was soon put on hold by the 2023 Writers Guild of America strike. Destin Daniel Cretton was hired to direct by October 2024 when Holland was confirmed to star, and the title was revealed in March 2025 as Spider-Man: Brand New Day. Avi Arad and Rachel O'Connor also produce the film. Filming began in August 2025 in Glasgow, Scotland, with soundstage work at Pinewood Studios in England, before wrapping in December 2025. Spider-Man: Brand New Day premiered at the Dolby Theatre in Los Angeles on July 27, 2026, and was released in the United States on July 31.

Brand New Day is set four years after the events of No Way Home in 2028. Jon Bernthal, Florence Pugh, Mark Ruffalo, and Zabryna Guevara reprise their respective MCU roles as Frank Castle / Punisher, Yelena Belova / Black Widow, Bruce Banner / Hulk, and Sheila Rivera. Sadie Sink is introduced as Jean Grey ahead of the untitled X-Men film (2028).

=== Avengers: Doomsday (2026) ===
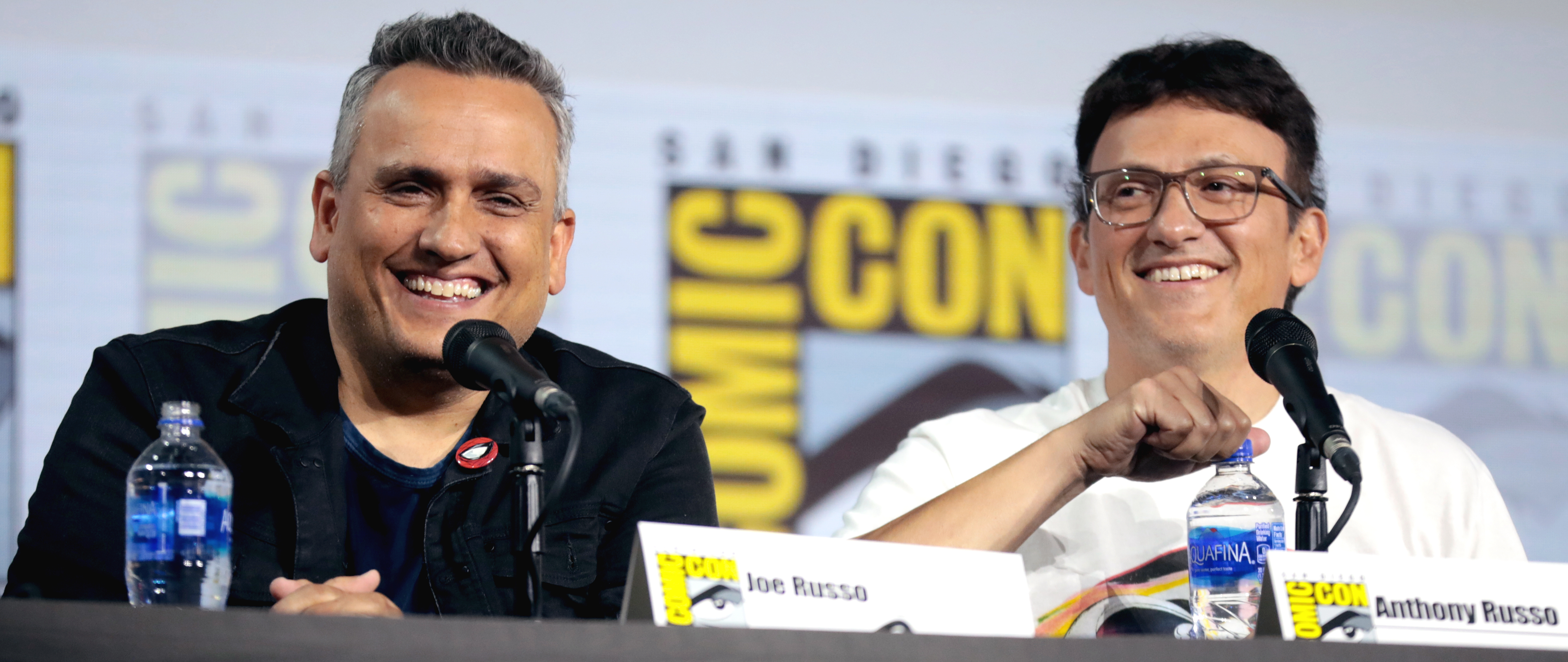
Joe and Anthony Russo return as directors of Avengers: Doomsday and Avengers: Secret Wars.

Groups of heroes from three different universes—the Avengers, Wakandans, and New Avengers from Earth-616; the Fantastic Four from Earth-828; and the "original" X-Men from Earth-10005—converge to face the existential threat of Doctor Doom.

Marvel Studios originally announced the fifth Avengers film as Avengers: The Kang Dynasty at San Diego Comic-Con (SDCC) in July 2022, to be directed by Destin Daniel Cretton, while Jeff Loveness was writing the script by September. They both left by November 2023 when Michael Waldron joined as writer. Kang the Conqueror actor Jonathan Majors was attached to star in the film until he was fired the following month after an assault conviction. At the July 2024 SDCC, Marvel Studios announced the film's new title; Robert Downey Jr.'s casting as the film's new antagonist Victor von Doom / Doctor Doom, having previously portrayed Tony Stark / Iron Man in the MCU; Anthony and Joe Russo as the directors; and Stephen McFeely as a co-writer, working with Waldron. Marvel Studios executives Louis D'Esposito and Jonathan Schwartz serve as producers alongside Feige. The film features an ensemble cast, including many actors who have appeared in other MCU media. Filming began in April 2025 at Pinewood Studios in England, and wrapped that September. Avengers: Doomsday is scheduled to be released on December 18, 2026.

Doomsday is set 14 months after the events of Thunderbolts* (2025) and after Brand New Day. Ian McKellen, Alan Cumming, Rebecca Romijn, and James Marsden reprise their respective roles as Erik Lehnsherr / Magneto, Kurt Wagner / Nightcrawler, Raven Darkhölme / Mystique, and Scott Summers / Cyclops from 20th Century Fox's X-Men film series.

=== Avengers: Secret Wars (2027) ===
Marvel Studios announced Avengers: Secret Wars at the July 2022 SDCC, with Waldron writing the script that October. The Russo brothers were announced in July 2024 as the directors, along with McFeely as the co-writer and Downey's casting as Doctor Doom. McKenna and Sommers also worked on the script. Filming is expected to begin in late 2026 at Pinewood Studios in England, and to last for approximately six months. Avengers: Secret Wars is scheduled to be released on December 17, 2027.

== Television series ==
The series in Phase Six will be or are being released on Disney+.

Television series of Phase Six
Series	Season	Episodes	Originally released		Production label(s)	Showrunner (Note: Zeb Wells served as the head writer for Marvel Zombies, while Jennifer Muro served as head writer on the Marvel Zombies continuation special, The Winter Soldier. Jeff Trammell served as both the head writer and showrunner of Your Friendly Neighborhood Spider-Man.)	Lead director(s)	Status
Series	Season	Episodes	First released	Last released	Production label(s)	Showrunner	Lead director(s)	Status
Eyes of Wakanda	1	4	August 1, 2025		Marvel Animation	Todd Harris	Todd Harris and John Fang	Released
Marvel Zombies	1	4	September 24, 2025		Marvel Animation	Bryan Andrews	Bryan Andrews	Released
Marvel Zombies	The Winter Soldier	2	October 2027		Marvel Animation	Bryan Andrews	Bryan Andrews	In production
Wonder Man	1	8	January 27, 2026		Marvel Television; Marvel Spotlight	Andrew Guest	Destin Daniel Cretton	Released
Daredevil: Born Again	2	8	March 24, 2026	May 5, 2026	Marvel Television	Dario Scardapane	Justin Benson & Aaron Moorhead	Released
Daredevil: Born Again	3	8	March 2027	TBA	Marvel Television	Dario Scardapane	Justin Benson & Aaron Moorhead	Post-production
VisionQuest	1	8	October 13, 2026	November 10, 2026	Marvel Television	Terry Matalas	Terry Matalas	Released
Your Friendly Neighborhood Spider-Man	2	TBA	January 13, 2027	TBA	Marvel Animation	Jeff Trammell	TBA	In production

=== Eyes of Wakanda (2025) ===
The Hatut Zaraze, Wakandan warriors, carry out dangerous missions around the world to retrieve vibranium artifacts throughout history.

Eyes of Wakanda was announced from Marvel Studios Animation in December 2023, created in collaboration with Black Panther (2018) and Black Panther: Wakanda Forever (2022) director Ryan Coogler's production company Proximity Media. In May 2024, Todd Harris was revealed to have created the series, and he serves as the director and showrunner. He previously served as a storyboard artist at Marvel Studios. John Fang also directs. Eyes of Wakanda was released on August 1, 2025, and consist of four episodes.

Eyes of Wakanda is set in several past time periods, with its respective episodes set in 1260 BC Crete during the Bronze Age, 1200 BC during the Trojan War, 1400 AD China at the start of the Ming dynasty, and 1896 AD Ethiopia during the First Italo-Ethiopian War.

=== Marvel Zombies season 1 and The Winter Soldier special (2025–present) ===
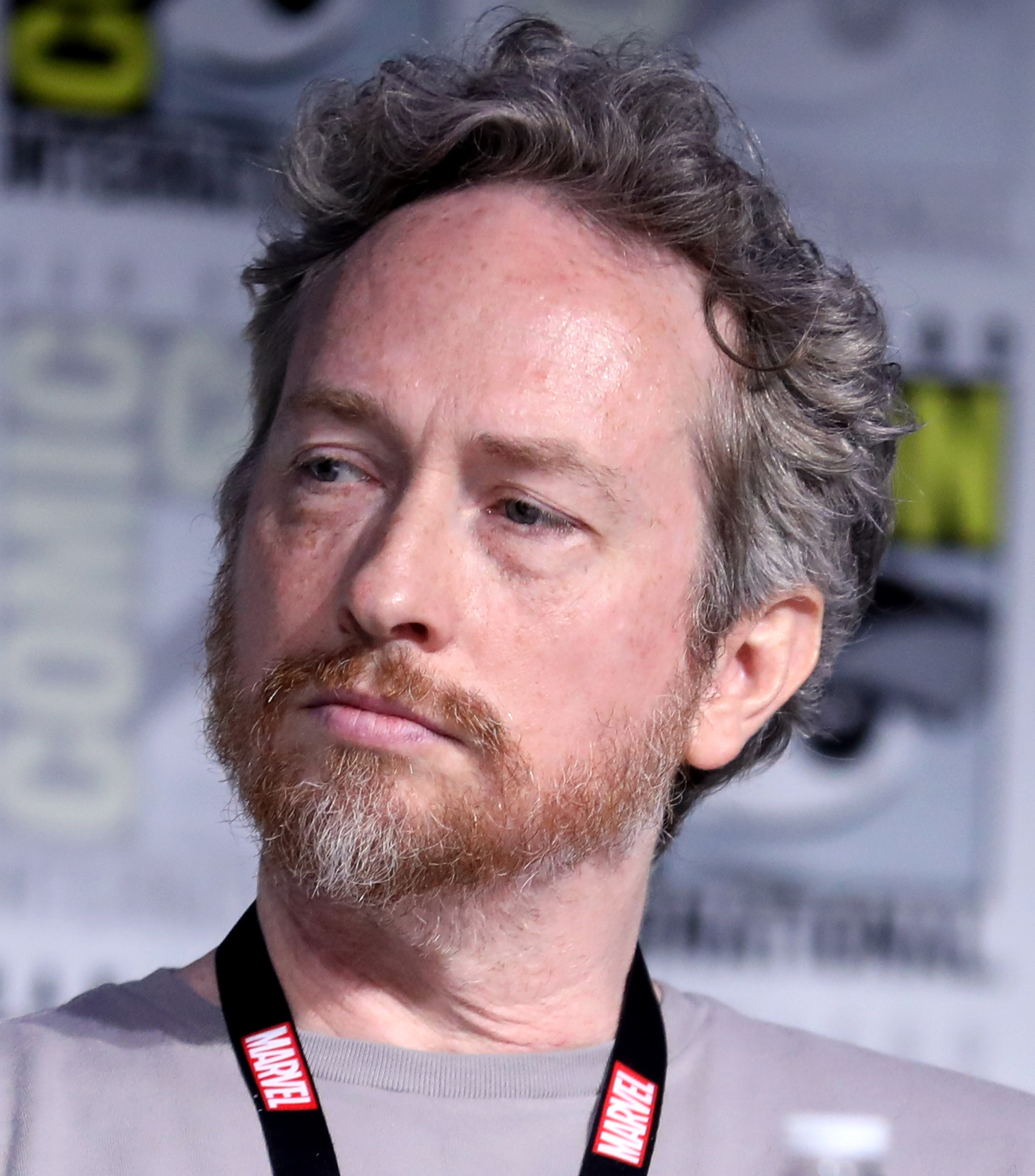
Zeb Wells, the head writer of Marvel Zombies

A group of survivors fight against former heroes and villains that have been turned into zombies.

In November 2021, an animated series based on the comic book series Marvel Zombies was announced, with Bryan Andrews directing and Zeb Wells serving as head writer; Andrews was later revealed as showrunner. It is a continuation of the reality first introduced in the What If...? episode "What If... Zombies?!" and includes characters introduced in Phase Four of the MCU. Marvel Zombies was released on Disney+ on September 24, 2025, and consists of four episodes. In January 2026, active development on a continuation of Marvel Zombies had begun with Andrews, and had entered production by April 2026. That October, the two-episode special, The Winter Soldier, was announced, with Jennifer Muro producing and serving as head writer on the special. The Winter Soldier will be released in October 2027. Two additional specials, The Fist of Khonshu and The Last Guardian, will be released in 2028 and 2029, respectively.

The first season of Marvel Zombies is set in 2023, five years after the events of the What If...? episode. Over 15 actors reprise their MCU roles in the season, with several actors from What If...? also reprising their roles. Todd Williams voices Eric Brooks / Blade Knight in the series.

=== Wonder Man (2026) ===
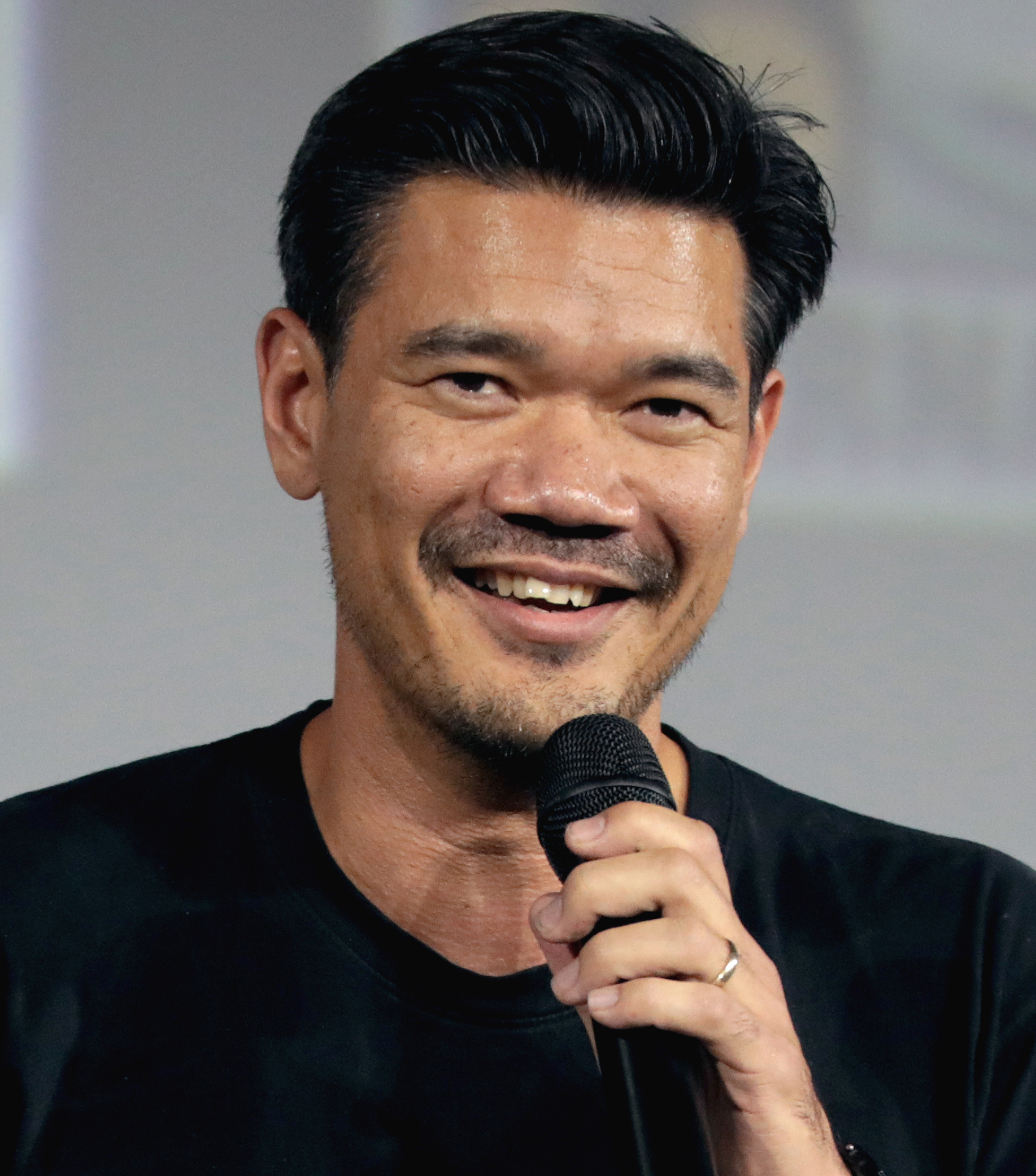
Destin Daniel Cretton, director of Spider-Man: Brand New Day and co-developer of Wonder Man

Struggling actor Simon Williams and actor Trevor Slattery try to earn roles in the remake of the superhero film Wonder Man.

In December 2021, Destin Daniel Cretton signed a multi-year deal with Marvel Studios to develop television projects for Disney+, with a comedy series already in development by then, through Cretton's company Family Owned. In June 2022, the series was revealed to be Wonder Man, centered on the character Simon Williams / Wonder Man, with Andrew Guest joining to develop the series and serve as head writer; Guest later became showrunner. In October, Yahya Abdul-Mateen II was cast as the title character. Filming began in April 2023 in Los Angeles, with Cretton, James Ponsoldt, Tiffany Johnson, and Stella Meghie directing episodes of the series, but was shut down the next month because of the WGA strike. Filming resumed in January 2024, and concluded by that April. The first season of Wonder Man was released in its entirety on Disney+ on January 27, 2026, as part of the "Marvel Spotlight" banner, and consists of eight episodes. The series was renewed for a second season in March 2026, but was canceled that July.

Wonder Man spans multiple years, from around late 2025 until 2027. Ben Kingsley and Arian Moayed reprise their respective MCU roles of Trevor Slattery and Department of Damage Control agent P. Cleary.

=== Daredevil: Born Again seasons 2 and 3 (2026–present) ===
In the second season, New York City mayor Wilson Fisk / Kingpin and his Anti-Vigilante Task Force (AVTF) are hunting Matt Murdock / Daredevil after Fisk's consolidation of power. Murdock goes underground and gathers allies to resist Fisk's corruption and the AVTF.

The first season of Daredevil: Born Again premiered in March 2025. The series was announced in July 2022 with an 18-episode first season, but following its creative overhaul in September 2023, this was split into two seasons, and the series was renewed for a third and final season in September 2025. Charlie Cox and Vincent D'Onofrio return to star as Murdock and Fisk, respectively, along with showrunner Dario Scardapane. Scardapane left the series in September 2026 after his contract was not renewed by Marvel in the midst of the third season's post-production. Directors Justin Benson and Aaron Moorhead returned for the second and third seasons, with Iain B. MacDonald and Solvan "Slick" Naim also directing in both seasons, while Angela Barnes served as a director in the second, and Jet Wilkinson served as a director in the third. Scardapane described the second season as the second part of the first season. Filming for the second season took place from the end of February to July 2025. with filming for the third season starting in March 2026 and concluding that July. The second season premiered on Disney+ on March 24, 2026, and consists of eight episodes, releasing weekly until May 5, 2026, while the third season, also consisting of eight episodes, is set to premiere in March 2027.

The second season is set six months after the first season, and is concurrent with the events of The Punisher: One Last Kill (2026), while the third season is set six months after the events of the second. For the second season, Krysten Ritter, Toby Leonard Moore, Royce Johnson, Geoffrey Cantor, and Mike Colter reprise their respective roles as Jessica Jones, James Wesley, Brett Mahoney, Mitchell Ellison, and Luke Cage from Marvel's Netflix television series. In the third season, Ritter and Colter once again reprise their roles, and are joined by Finn Jones and Élodie Yung reprising their Netflix series' roles as Danny Rand / Iron Fist and Elektra Natchios.

=== VisionQuest (2026) ===
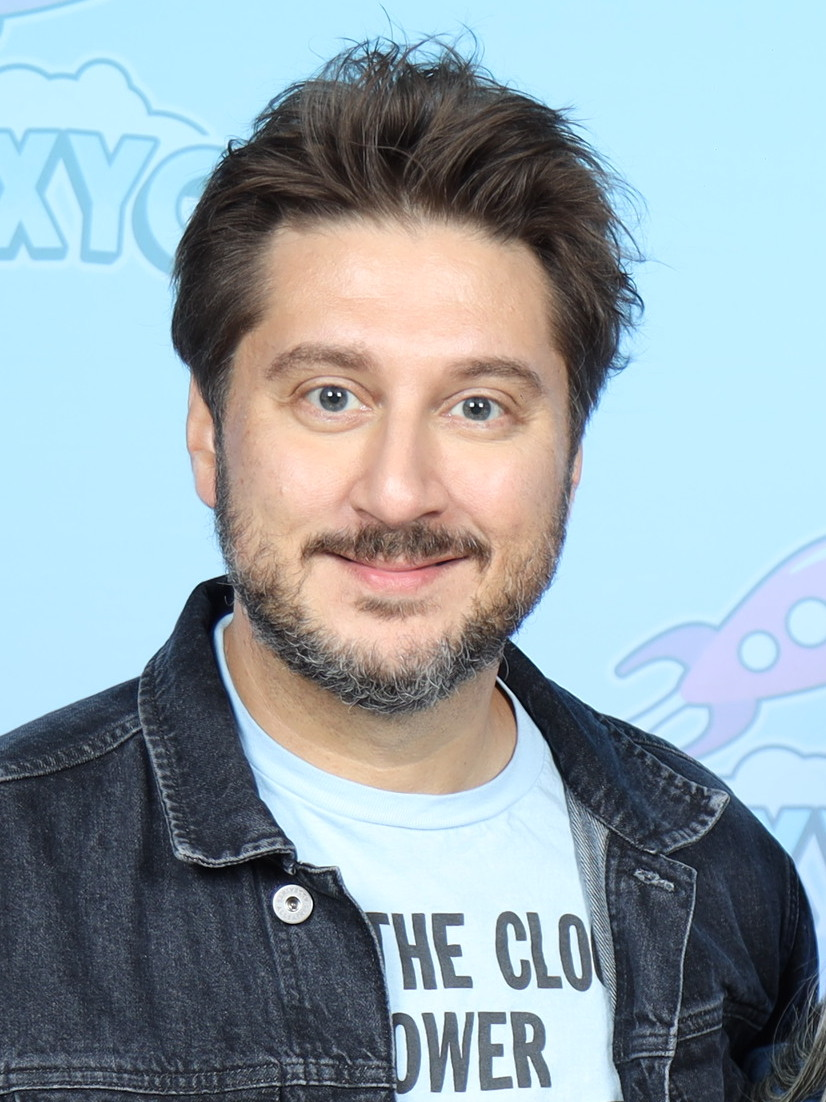
Terry Matalas redeveloped VisionQuest as its showrunner and lead director.

After being resurrected in WandaVision, the synthezoid Vision lives in hiding while he attempts to understand who he is by communicating with various artificial intelligences (AIs) personas that are embedded in his programming. When a bounty is placed on Vision's head, he goes on the run with a mysterious teenager who may be his reincarnated son.

A spin-off series from WandaVision centered on Paul Bettany's character Vision, titled Vision Quest, was in development by October 2022. Jac Schaeffer was set to return as head writer with Bettany starring, but Schaeffer was no longer developing it by May 2024 due to her focus on the first spin-off, Agatha All Along (2024), and Terry Matalas was hired to redevelop the series as its showrunner. The series concludes a trilogy that also includes WandaVision and Agatha All Along. Filming had begun by March 2025 at Pinewood Studios in London, with Matalas, Christopher J. Byrne, Vincenzo Natali, and Gandja Monteiro directing episodes of the series, and concluded in July 2025. VisionQuest premiered on Disney+ on October 13, 2026, and consisted of eight episodes, concluding on November 10.

VisionQuest is set approximately 18 months after Agatha All Along; this is years after the events of WandaVision and around the events of Brand New Day. Various AIs that have previously appeared in the MCU are featured in VisionQuest, including Ultron (portrayed by James Spader), E.D.I.T.H. (Emily Hampshire), F.R.I.D.A.Y. (Orla Brady), and J.A.R.V.I.S. (James D'Arcy); in prior MCU media, the latter three AIs were respectively voiced by Dawn Michelle King, Kerry Condon, and Bettany, while D'Arcy played J.A.R.V.I.S.'s human inspiration, Edwin Jarvis. Faran Tahir also reprises his role as the Ten Rings leader Raza from the MCU film Iron Man (2008), while Ruaridh Mollica portrays Vision's son Tommy Maximoff and Thomas Shepherd, taking over from Jett Klyne who portrayed Tommy in WandaVision and the MCU film Doctor Strange in the Multiverse of Madness (2022). Bettany also portrayed J.I.M. / Synthetic Man, the world's first synthezoid, and J.I.M.'s creator, Phineas Horton, in the series. Joe Locke reprises his role as Billy Maximoff from Agatha All Along, while Robert Downey Jr. and Elizabeth Olsen make cameo appearances in a mid-credits scene in the final episode in their MCU roles of Victor von Doom / Doctor Doom and Wanda Maximoff / Scarlet Witch, respectively.

=== Your Friendly Neighborhood Spider-Man season 2 ===
The first season of Your Friendly Neighborhood Spider-Man premiered in January 2025. A second season, initially titled Spider-Man: Sophomore Year, was announced in July 2022, continuing the naming convention of the series' original title, Spider-Man: Freshman Year. Jeff Trammell returned as head writer and showrunner from the first season, and said in January 2025 that the series was not limited to covering one school year per season. The second season is scheduled to premiere on January 13, 2027. A third season is also in production.

== Television special ==
Phase Six television special
Special	Release date	Director	Writers
The Punisher: One Last Kill	May 12, 2026	Reinaldo Marcus Green	Jon Bernthal & Reinaldo Marcus Green

=== The Punisher: One Last Kill (2026) ===
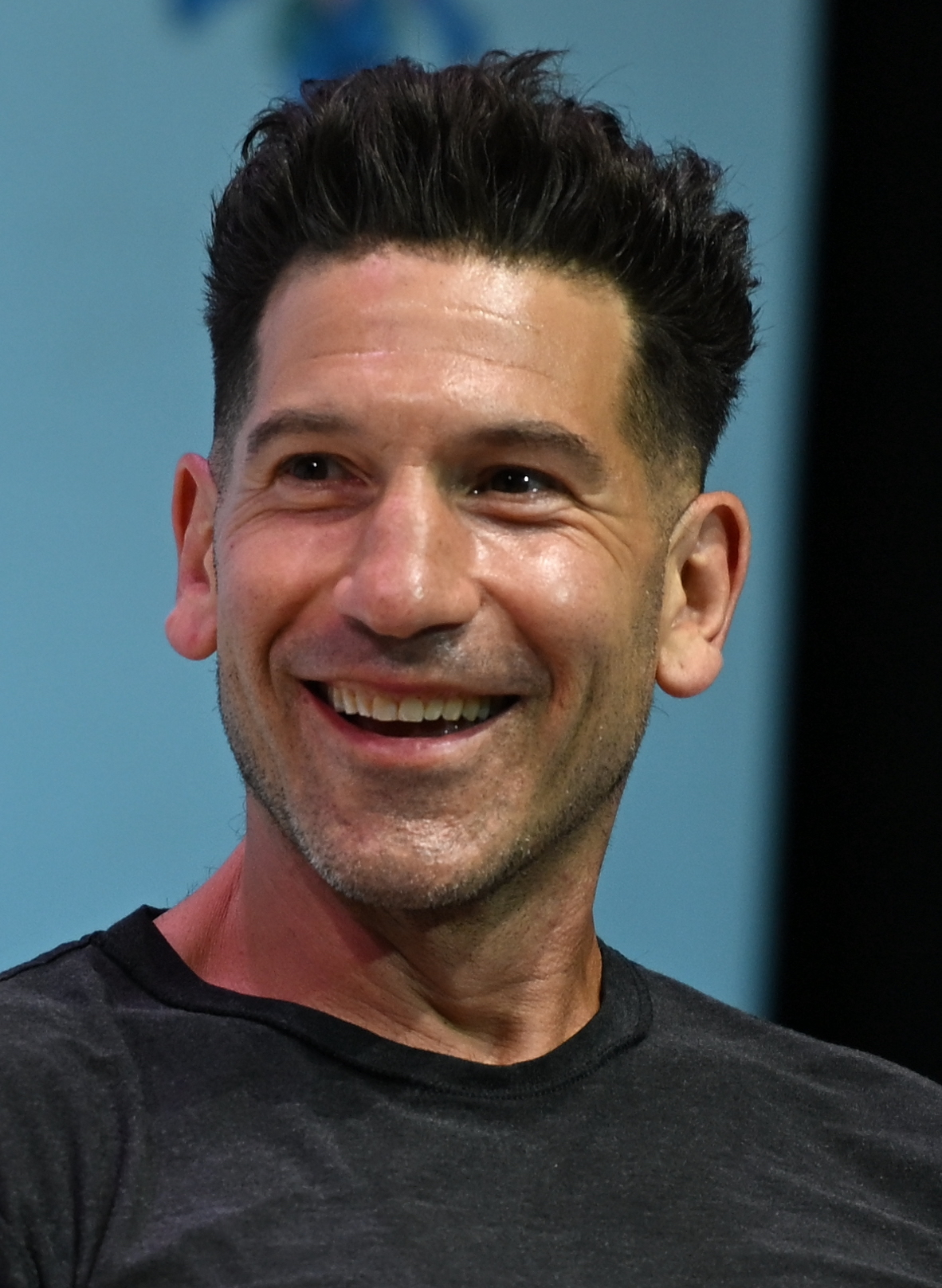
Jon Bernthal, the star, co-writer, and an executive producer of The Punisher: One Last Kill

After avenging his family's deaths, Frank Castle searches for meaning beyond revenge while haunted by ghosts of his past, until he is drawn back into conflict by crime lord Ma Gnucci.

In February 2025, a Special Presentation centered on Jon Bernthal's character Frank Castle / Punisher from Marvel's Netflix series and Daredevil: Born Again was announced to be in development. Reinaldo Marcus Green was set to direct the special and was writing the script with Bernthal, after they worked together on the miniseries We Own This City (2022). Filming began in mid-July 2025, in New York City, and wrapped in early August. In March 2026, the special was titled The Punisher: One Last Kill. It was released on Disney+ on May 12, 2026, one week after the Born Again season 2 finale. It is marketed as a "Marvel Television Special Presentation".

One Last Kill takes place concurrently with the events of Born Again season 2. Jason R. Moore and Kelli Barrett reprise their respective roles from Marvel's Netflix series The Punisher (2017–2019) as Curtis Hoyle and Maria Castle, while Deborah Ann Woll reprises her MCU role as Karen Page. Bernthal's daughter Addie and Eduardo Campirano respectively portray Castle's deceased children Lisa and Frank Jr., replacing Nicolette Pierini and Aidan Pierce Brennan from The Punisher.

== Timeline ==
Key:
- Occurs on the MCU's Sacred Timeline
- Occurs outside the MCU's Sacred Timeline at a set timeframe

Marvel Cinematic Universe: Phase Six timeline Full timeline at Marvel Cinematic Universe timeline Titles in parentheses are included for reference
1260 B.C.–1896	Eyes of Wakanda
1897–1963	
1964	The Fantastic Four: First Steps (Note: The Fantastic Four: First Steps takes place on Earth-828 in 1964.)
1965–2017	
2018	("What If... Zombies?!")
2019–2022	
2023	Marvel Zombies season 1 (Note: The first season of Marvel Zombies takes place on the alternate reality from the What If...? episode "What If... Zombies?!" (2021).)
2023	(WandaVision)
2024	(No Way Home)
2025–2027	Wonder Man
2026	(Agatha All Along)
2027	(Born Again season 1)
2027	(Thunderbolts*)
2027	Born Again season 2
2027	One Last Kill
2028	Brand New Day
2028	VisionQuest
2028	Doomsday

Eyes of Wakanda is set in several past time periods, from 1260 BC to 1896 AD. Wonder Man spans multiple years, from around late 2025 until mid 2027. The second season of Born Again is set six months after the first season, and is concurrent with the events of The Punisher: One Last Kill, while the third season of Born Again is set six months after the second. Brand New Day is set four years after No Way Home in 2028. VisionQuest is set approximately 18 months after Agatha All Along; this is years after the events of WandaVision and around the events of Brand New Day. Doomsday will also be set in 2028, 14 months after the end of Thunderbolts*, and after Brand New Day. The Fantastic Four: First Steps is set on Earth-828 in 1964. Marvel Zombies is set in 2023 on the alternate reality from the What If...? episode "What If... Zombies?!" (2021), five years after those events.

== Recurring cast and characters ==
List indicator

This section includes characters who will appear or have appeared in multiple Phase Six films or series, and have appeared in the billing block for at least one film or have been a starring cast member for at least one series.

- A dark grey cell indicates the character was not in the films or series, or that the character's presence has not yet been confirmed.

Characters are listed alphabetically by last name, as applicable.

Recurring cast and characters of Phase Six
Character	Film	Television	Animation
Yelena Belova Black Widow	Florence Pugh		Florence Pugh
Frank Castle Punisher	Jon Bernthal	Jon Bernthal	
Wilson Fisk Kingpin		Vincent D'Onofrio	
Mac Gargan Scorpion	Michael Mando		Jonathan Medina
Jean Grey	Sadie Sink		
Ben Grimm Thing	Ebon Moss-Bachrach		
Scott Lang Ant-Man	Paul Rudd		Paul Rudd
Matt Murdock Daredevil		Charlie Cox	Charlie Cox
Karen Page		Deborah Ann Woll	
Peter Parker Spider-Man	Tom Holland		Hudson Thames
Benjamin Poindexter Bullseye		Wilson Bethel	
Reed Richards Mister Fantastic	Pedro Pascal		
Sheila Rivera	Zabryna Guevara	Zabryna Guevara	
Steve Rogers	Chris Evans		
Alexei Shostakov Red Guardian	David Harbour		David Harbour
Shuri Black Panther	Letitia Wright		
Johnny Storm Human Torch	Joseph Quinn		
Sue Storm Invisible Woman	Vanessa Kirby		
Stephen Strange	Benedict Cumberbatch		
Thor	Chris Hemsworth		Greg Furman
Vision	Paul Bettany	Paul Bettany	
Victor von Doom Doctor Doom	Robert Downey Jr.	Robert Downey Jr.	
John Walker U.S. Agent	Wyatt Russell		Wyatt Russell
Sam Wilson Captain America	Anthony Mackie		
Xu Shang-Chi	Simu Liu		Simu Liu

== Music ==
Albums for Phase Six films
Title	U.S. release date	Length	Composer	Label(s)	Ref.
The Fantastic Four: First Steps (Original Motion Picture Soundtrack)	July 18, 2025	82:07	Michael Giacchino	Hollywood Records; Marvel Music	
Spider-Man: Brand New Day (Original Motion Picture Soundtrack)	July 31, 2026	77:38	Michael Giacchino	Sony Classical Records	
Avengers: Doomsday	TBA	TBD	Alan Silvestri	TBA	
Avengers: Secret Wars	TBA	TBD	Alan Silvestri	TBA	

Albums for Phase Six series
Series	Title	U.S. release date	Length	Composer(s)	Labels	Ref.
Eyes of Wakanda	Original Soundtrack	August 8, 2025	61:02	Hesham Nazih	Hollywood Records; Marvel Music	
Marvel Zombies season 1	Original Soundtrack	September 26, 2025	72:00	Laura Karpman and Nora Kroll-Rosenbaum	Hollywood Records; Marvel Music	
Wonder Man	Original Soundtrack	January 30, 2026	41:34	Joel P. West	Hollywood Records; Marvel Music	
Daredevil: Born Again season 2	Vol. 1 (Episodes 1–4) (Original Soundtrack)	April 7, 2026	39:34	The Newton Brothers	Hollywood Records; Marvel Music	
Daredevil: Born Again season 2	Vol. 2 (Episodes 5–8) (Original Soundtrack)	May 5, 2026	44:27	The Newton Brothers	Hollywood Records; Marvel Music	
VisionQuest	Vol. 1 (Episodes 1–4) (Original Soundtrack)	October 22, 2026	79:46	Mick Giacchino	Hollywood Records; Marvel Music	
VisionQuest	Vol. 2 (Episodes 5–8) (Original Soundtrack)	November 12, 2026	79:51	Mick Giacchino	Hollywood Records; Marvel Music	

Albums for Phase Six specials
Title	U.S. release date	Length	Composer	Labels	Ref.
The Punisher: One Last Kill (Original Soundtrack)	May 15, 2026	24:22	Kris Bowers	Hollywood Records; Marvel Music	

== Home media ==
Home media releases of Phase Six films
Film	Digital release	DVD/Blu-ray release
The Fantastic Four: First Steps	September 23, 2025	October 14, 2025
Spider-Man: Brand New Day	October 6, 2026	December 15, 2026

== Reception ==
=== Box office performance ===
Box office performance of Phase Six films
Film	U.S. release date	Box office gross			All-time ranking		Budget	Ref.
Film	U.S. release date	U.S. and Canada	Other territories	Worldwide	U.S. and Canada	Worldwide	Budget	Ref.
The Fantastic Four: First Steps	July 25, 2025	$274,286,610	$247,572,118	$521,858,728	145	265	$200 million	
Spider-Man: Brand New Day	July 31, 2026	$959,059,276	$1,564,668,977	$2,523,728,253	1	3	$225 million	
Total		$1,233,345,886	$1,812,241,095	$3,045,586,981	–	–	$425 million	

=== Critical and public response ===
Critical and public response of Phase Six films
Film	Critical		Public	
Film	Rotten Tomatoes	Metacritic	CinemaScore	PostTrak
The Fantastic Four: First Steps	86% (408 reviews)	65 (54 reviews)	A–	86%
Spider-Man: Brand New Day	90% (439 reviews)	66 (56 reviews)	A	—N/a

Critical response of Phase Six television series
Title	Season	Rotten Tomatoes	Metacritic
Eyes of Wakanda	–	92% (39 reviews)	71 (11 reviews)
Marvel Zombies	1	66% (35 reviews)	66 (10 reviews)
Wonder Man	–	91% (114 reviews)	75 (31 reviews)
Daredevil: Born Again	2	87% (135 reviews)	73 (16 reviews)
VisionQuest	–	86% (133 reviews)	64 (25 reviews)

Critical response of Phase Six television specials
Special	Rotten Tomatoes	Metacritic
The Punisher: One Last Kill	73% (75 reviews)	63 (15 reviews)

== Tie-in media ==
=== Comic books ===
Tie-in comics of Phase Six
Title	No. of issues	Publication date		Writer	Artist
Title	No. of issues	First published	Last published	Writer	Artist
Fantastic Four: First Steps	1	July 9, 2025		Matt Fraction	Mark Buckingham
Fantastic Four: First Foes	1	March 25, 2026		Dan Slott	Mark Buckingham
Fantastic Four: First Foes – Shalla-Bal	1	July 8, 2026		Charles Soule	Mark Buckingham
Fantastic Four: First Foes – Dragon Man	1	September 30, 2026		Greg Pak	Mark Buckingham
Fantastic Four: First Foes – The Wizard	1	December 9, 2026		Fabian Nicieza	Mark Buckingham
Your Friendly Neighborhood Spider-Man Season 2	4	December 9, 2026	TBA	Christos Gage	Eric Gapstur

=== Podcasts ===
For the second season of Daredevil: Born Again, Marvel Television launched the nine-episode Daredevil: Born Again Official Podcast on March 17, 2026. It features conversations with the cast, crew, and creatives, exploring the series so far and examining each episode of the second season. The Daredevil: Born Again Official Podcast is available on Disney+ and YouTube, with an audio-only version available on various podcast platforms.

The Countdown to Avengers: Doomsday official podcast, hosted by Iman Vellani—who stars as Kamala Khan / Ms. Marvel in the MCU—and podcaster Frank Alvarez, premiered on August 27, 2026. The five-episode weekly podcast recaps key MCU moments leading up to Doomsday, respectively covering the films The Avengers (2012), Avengers: Age of Ultron (2015), Captain America: Civil War (2016), Avengers: Infinity War (2018), and Avengers: Endgame (2019), with the final episode coinciding with the release of Avengers Endgame: Encore in September.

== Related ==
- X-Men '97 seasons 2 and 3: A continuation of X-Men: The Animated Series (1992–1997), produced by Marvel Studios via its Marvel Animation label. Jake Castorena served as supervising producer with Chase Conley and Emmett Yonemura directing. Creator Beau DeMayo served as head writer for the second season, before being fired from the series. Matthew Chauncey, a writer on Marvel Studios's first animated series What If...? (2021–2024), was hired to replace DeMayo as head writer of the series moving forward. Many cast members from the original series returned to reprise their roles or voice new characters. X-Men '97 is not set in the Sacred Timeline of the MCU, though Feige did consider integrating the series with the MCU during development. Instead, X-Men '97 shares continuity with the original series and several other animated Marvel series that were released in the 1990s; within Marvel Comics' multiverse, X-Men: The Animated Series exists on Earth-92131. Despite existing outside the Sacred Timeline, the series is listed in the MCU's Multiverse Saga section on Disney+. The second season was released from July 1 to August 12, 2026, with the third season expected a year after.
- Avengers Endgame: Encore: On September 25, 2026, Endgame was re-released in theaters as Avengers Endgame: Encore in anticipation of Doomsday, featuring five-to-six minutes of additional footage, which was shot during production of Doomsday. Joe Russo said the re-release was "critically important", believing it was "required viewing" to follow the story of Doomsday, with clues included throughout the new footage hinting towards the larger story. The new footage acts as a narrative bridge between the two films, enhancing the story of Doomsday and showing a natural progression from Endgame.
