= The Avengers Initiative (disambiguation) =

The Avengers Initiative may refer to:

- The Avengers Initiative, a comic book
- "The Avengers Initiative" (Marvel Studios: Legends), an episode of Marvel Studios: Legends

== See also ==
- Avengers: The Initiative
