= Fantastic Four: First Steps (comic) =

2025 film tie-in comic book

- Cover art by Phil Noto

Publication information
- Publisher: Marvel Comics
- Format: One-shot
- Genre: Superhero
- Publication date: July 9, 2025
- No. of issues: 1
- Main characters: Fantastic Four; Mole Man

Creative team
- Written by: Matt Fraction
- Artist: Mark Buckingham
- Letterer: Joe Caramagna
- Colorist: Alex Sinclair
- Editor: Tom Brevoort

Fantastic Four: First Steps is a prequel tie-in comic published by Marvel Comics for the Marvel Studios film The Fantastic Four: First Steps. The comic was written by Matt Fraction, with art from Mark Buckingham and a cover by Phil Noto. Fraction and Marvel Comics worked closely with Marvel Studios to create the comic, having it be set within the Marvel Cinematic Universe (MCU) to tell the origin story of the Fantastic Four.

Fantastic Four: First Steps was published on July 9, 2025, ahead of the film's release later that month, and received positive reviews from critics. Additional one-shot comics were released quarterly in 2026 with the titles Fantastic Four: First Foes. They explored additional moments of the team's early adventures as well as origins for their foes René Rodin / Mad Thinker, Shalla-Bal / Silver Surfer, Damien Albo / Diablo, Dragon Man, and Bentley Wittman / Wizard.

== Plot ==
Reed Richards, Ben Grimm, Johnny Storm, and Sue Storm pilot a spaceship, but are bombarded with celestial radiation and have to return to Earth. They isolate themselves in a building in Rocket City at Reed's insistence in order to fully understand the way their physiologies were changed and ensure they were not a danger to others. Having learned to control their new superpowers, the group get frustrated with their isolation and decide to leave when they see Harvey Elder leading an attack on New York City.

They arrive in New York City and are met by paparazzi, when Giganto appears from underground. Sue Storm works to protect civilians while Richards, Grimm, and Johnny Storm attack Giganto. Sue Storm eventually creates a forcefield around Giganto, suffocating him. Suddenly, the Pan Am Building falls into the ground as flashbacks reveal that Elder is attacking out of revenge for the surface world's drilling into his underground society, Subterranea. The team, now dubbed the Fantastic Four, reach the ground floor of the Pan Am Building, where Elder orders his army to attack. A pregnant Moloid gets trapped in a forcefield, worrying Elder and causing him to surrender and end the attack. Elder is taken into the Fantastic Four's custody while the team discuss the pregnant attacker's dedication to the cause.

Sue Storm approaches Elder in custody, and Elder reveals that he studied with her grandfather. Storm acknowledges Subterranea as a society and asks how the people of Subterranea and the people of the surface world can coexist peacefully. Storm helps Elder guarantee sovereignty for Subterranea, and the Fantastic Four help to rebuild the underground city as they are recognized by the public as a team of superheroes.

== Publication history ==
In April 2025, Marvel Comics and Marvel Studios announced a tie-in one-shot comic for the Marvel Cinematic Universe (MCU) film The Fantastic Four: First Steps, titled Fantastic Four: First Steps, to be released on July 9, 2025, ahead of the film's July 25 release date. The comic is written by Matt Fraction and drawn by Mark Buckingham, with colors by Alex Sinclair and lettering by Joe Caramagna. Tom Brevoort served as the comic's editor and it featured cover art by Phil Noto. Marvel Comics worked closely with Marvel Studios and the film's creatives to ensure the comic had the same style and tone as the film, with the comics creators visiting the set during filming. Justin Carter from Gizmodo said it was an "inspired choice" to have a comic "sell the idea [the Fantastic Four have] been around for years and have a history" within the MCU and felt Marvel was giving more significance to this comic than their other MCU tie-in ones.

The in-universe comic was meant to be published by the Future Foundation in collaboration with Marvel Comics Group with the "first-ever authorized retelling of the Fantastic Four's early adventures", coinciding with the fourth anniversary of the team gaining their powers. The team's origin story in the MCU is similar to the one from the comics in The Fantastic Four #1 by Stan Lee and Jack Kirby, with Noto's cover a recreation of that debut comic. Fantastic Four: First Steps includes the team's first encounter with Harvey Elder / Mole Man. Actor Paul Walter Hauser was confirmed to be portraying Elder in the film through the comic; his role in the film had been unknown prior to the comic's release, with speculation that he was playing Elder given his resemblance to the character. Casey Loving at TheWrap referred to this as the biggest revelation of the comic. The comic also features in-universe advertisements.

== Reception ==
According to review aggregator Comic Book Roundup, Fantastic Four: First Steps received a 7.9 out of 10, based on 4 reviews.

David Brooke at AIPT gave the comic a 7.5 out of 10, enjoying the in-universe aspects of the comic and referred to it as a celebration of the Fantastic Four, though noted the story similarities to The Fantastic Four #1. He found the comic's art to be uneven. Casey Loving from TheWrap noted how the comic helped introduce the characteristics of each member of the Fantastic Four for readers ahead of the film. He noted a difference to the team's costumes in the comic from those seen in promotional material for the film.

Praise was given to the team's response to Mole Man's imprisonment and their subsequent conversations. Brooke referred to it as "a wholesome and diplomatic turn that shows this team isn't about jailing every villain, but finding reasonable solutions". Loving felt the moment showed "an increase in focus and agency" for Sue Storm compared to how the character was written in the early issues of the Fantastic Four comics. He was hopeful that it indicated Storm would have a larger and "more well-rounded" presence in the film after the previous film adaptations saw the character take a lesser role. Tom Chapman from Den of Geek believed since the comic prominently featured Elder, the character would have a limited role in the film.

== Additional one-shots ==
In December 2025, Marvel Comics announced four additional tie-in one-shot comics that, similar to the First Steps one-shot, are presented as in-universe comics published by the Future Foundation and expand on characters and moments from the film; the four comics are expected to be released quarterly throughout 2026. Buckingham, Sinclair, Caramanga, and Noto returned as artist, colorist, letterer, and cover artist, respectively, for the additional one-shots.

The first one-shot, titled Fantastic Four: First Foes, was released on March 25, 2026. It was written by Dan Slott, and explores an early adventure of the Fantastic Four facing off against René Rodin / Mad Thinker. The one-shot also features the character Super-Adaptive Android, based on both Super-Adaptoid and Awesome Android, the latter of which was created by the Mad Thinker in Marvel's main comics continuity. A two-page short story written by Ryan North, "Fantastic Science", is also included, which is inspired by Reed's educational television programming as seen in the film.

The second one-shot, Fantastic Four: First Foes – Shalla-Bal, was released on July 8, 2026, written by Charles Soule. It focuses on how Shalla-Bal became Galactus's herald, the Silver Surfer, before the events of the film. Shalla-Bal's unnamed daughter from the film appears in the comic, which is set primarily on Polaris—one of the planets mentioned in the film as having been destroyed by Galactus. A new "Fantastic Science" short story written by North is also included.

The third one-shot comic is titled Fantastic Four: First Foes – Dragon Man and was released on September 30, 2026. It was written by Greg Pak, and sees Grimm struggling with his rocky form as a potential cure for his condition emerges and involves the android Dragon Man. Also featured in the comic is the character Damien Albo / Diablo.

The fourth and final one-shot comic, titled Fantastic Four: First Foes – The Wizard, is scheduled for release on January 13, 2027, and written by Fabian Nicieza. It was originally planned for release on December 9, 2026. The comic sees the Fantastic Four facing off against Bentley Wittman / Wizard and his newly assembled team, the Frightful Four, as they plan to steal the Baxter Building itself.
