= Marvel Cinematic Universe tie-in comics =

Standalone or limited series comic books

Publication information
- Publisher: Marvel Comics
- Format: Limited series One-shots
- Genre: Superhero
- Publication date: 2008 – present
- No. of issues: 1–8
- Main character: Characters appearing in the Marvel Cinematic Universe

The Marvel Cinematic Universe tie-in comic books are limited series or one-shot comics published by Marvel Comics that tie into the films and television series (both those produced by Marvel Television and those produced by Marvel Studios) of the Marvel Cinematic Universe (MCU). The comics are written and illustrated by various individuals and each typically consists of one to four issues. They are intended to tell additional stories about existing characters, or to make connections between MCU projects, without necessarily expanding the universe or introducing new concepts or characters.

The first MCU tie-in comics to be published were Iron Man: Fast Friends, The Incredible Hulk: The Fury Files, and Nick Fury: Spies Like Us, all in 2008. They were followed by an adaptation of Iron Man in 2010, along with Iron Man 2: Fist of Iron (2010), Iron Man 2: Public Identity (2010), Iron Man 2: Agents of S.H.I.E.L.D. (2010), Captain America: First Vengeance (2011), Captain America & Thor: Avengers (2011), The Avengers Prelude: Fury's Big Week (2012), The Avengers Initiative (2012), The Avengers Prelude: Black Widow Strikes (2012), and an adaptation of Iron Man 2 (2012). Comic tie-ins for Marvel's television series began in 2014 with Agents of S.H.I.E.L.D.: The Chase, followed by Jessica Jones (2015). The first tie-in comic series set in an alternate universe within the MCU is Your Friendly Neighborhood Spider-Man, released in late 2024.

Marvel changed its approach to film tie-in material in 2012, retroactively dividing the tie-in comics into those that exist within the MCU continuity, and those that are merely inspired by the films and television series. Since then, Iron Man 3 Prelude (2013), Thor: The Dark World Prelude (2013), Captain America: The Winter Soldier Infinite Comic (2014), Guardians of the Galaxy Infinite Comic (2014), Guardians of the Galaxy Prelude (2014), Avengers: Age of Ultron Prelude – This Scepter'd Isle (2015), Ant-Man Prelude (2015), Ant-Man – Scott Lang: Small Time (2015), Captain America: Civil War Prelude Infinite Comic (2016), Doctor Strange Prelude (2016), Doctor Strange Prelude Infinite Comic (2016), Black Panther Prelude (2017), and Avengers: Infinity War Prelude (2018) have been released in the former category, along with film adaptations of Thor (2013), Captain America: The First Avenger (2013), The Avengers (2014–15), Iron Man 3 and Captain America: The Winter Soldier (2015–16), Guardians of the Galaxy (2017), Captain America: Civil War (2017), The Incredible Hulk (2017), Thor: The Dark World (2017), Ant-Man (2018), and Avengers: Infinity War (2018–19).

== Development ==
The MCU [comics] are going to be stories set within movie continuity. [They are] not necessarily direct adaptations of the movies, but maybe something that happened off screen and was mentioned in the movie...[Marvel Studios chief] Kevin Feige is involved with these and in some cases maybe the writers of the movies would be involved [as well.]

— Marvel Comics editor-in-chief Joe Quesada outlining his plan for the MCU comic books in November 2010.

In 2008, Marvel released Iron Man: Fast Friends, a comic prequel to Iron Man, for which writer Paul Tobin was given a broad outline and some "temporal staging" so as to allow the comic to tie into the film. Later that year, The Incredible Hulk: Fury Files, which serves as a prequel to The Incredible Hulk, was released, detailing an encounter between the Hulk and Nick Fury, characters who had not yet been seen together in the MCU. Writer Frank Tieri noted that the tie-in comics "provide Marvel with the opportunity to do a lot of different things" that other media do not, including the exploration of non-superhero genres and the reintroduction of older characters.

Alejandro Arbona, the Marvel editor tasked with overseeing the 2010 tie-in comics Iron Man 2: Public Identity and Iron Man 2: Agents of S.H.I.E.L.D., explained that Marvel "want to show readers more of that world, that connective tissue between all the movies, and a little bit more of how the characters interact", so the publishing side worked with Brad Winderbaum, Jeremy Latcham, and Will Corona Pilgrim at Marvel Studios to decide which concepts should be carried over from the Marvel Comics Universe to the Marvel Cinematic Universe, what to show in the tie-in comics and what to leave for the films, and how to "make these stories as strong as possible" from their experience making the films.

For Marvel's The Avengers in 2012, Marvel's senior vice-president of sales David Gabriel described a "more focused" approach to tie-ins than previously, with the intention to reach fans of 'all walks of life'. This was echoed by Rich Thomas, global editorial director at Disney Publishing, who wanted the Avengers program to be "all things to all people. Just like the film, from the youngest reader...to the Marvel enthusiast." Since then, many of the tie-ins have had the red 'Avengers' stamp on the cover. Pilgrim, the creative director of research and development at Marvel Studios, confirmed that the previously released Public Identity, Agents of S.H.I.E.L.D., and First Vengeance, were all official MCU stories, with the other previously released tie-in comics considered to be inspired by the MCU only.

When we started launching Marvel Studios and decided these movies were interconnected...we wanted to make sure it made sense as a cohesive, whole piece, [which] really sort of freed us up to start asking what other stories would we like to tell....anything that we really loved but didn't necessarily have a place in the film[s] is fair game.

— Captain America: The First Avenger co-producer Stephen Broussard in February 2011, on the conception of the tie-in comics.

Comic writer Fred Van Lente stated in 2013 that he had proposed a regular comic series set within the MCU to Marvel, but they wished to keep all possibilities open for potential film and television development. He said that this was also the reason why Marvel does not want writers to introduce new elements to the MCU through tie-in comics. In March 2014, Pilgrim confirmed that the MCU Infinite Comics were officially canon. That July, the MCU tie-in comics expanded to television tie-ins with the release of Agents of S.H.I.E.L.D.: The Chase, a comic inspired by the first season of Agents of S.H.I.E.L.D. In November, Marvel Comics Editor-in-Chief Axel Alonso avoided a question of whether an ongoing comic series could be set within the MCU, but did note that Marvel Comics would "always be working on books set in the Cinematic Universe...the collected editions of those comics end up being some of the best sellers of the year".

In February 2015, Pilgrim clarified that the canon tie-ins "are considered official MCU canon stories" set in the same universe as the films and television series, whereas the other, "inspired by" tie-ins are "more about having another fun adventure with the Avengers....where we get to show off all the characters from the film in costume and in comic form", but not affect the official MCU continuity.

== Marvel Cinematic Universe-set titles ==
Marvel Cinematic Universe tie-in comics
Title	No. of Issues	Publication date(s)		Writer(s)	Artist(s)
Title	No. of Issues	First published	Last published	Writer(s)	Artist(s)
Iron Man: I Am Iron Man!	2	January 27, 2010	February 24, 2010	Peter David	Sean Chen
Iron Man 2: Public Identity	3	April 28, 2010	May 12, 2010	Joe Casey and Justin Theroux	Barry Kitson
Iron Man 2: Agents of S.H.I.E.L.D.	1	September 1, 2010		Joe Casey	Tim Green, Felix Ruiz, and Matt Camp
Captain America: First Vengeance	8 (digital); 4 (print)	May 4, 2011	June 29, 2011	Fred Van Lente	Neil Edwards and Luke Ross
Marvel's The Avengers Prelude: Fury's Big Week	8 (digital); 4 (print)	March 7, 2012	April 18, 2012	Story by : Christopher Yost and Eric Pearson; Scripts by : Eric Pearson	Luke Ross
Marvel's The Avengers: Black Widow Strikes	3	May 2, 2012	June 6, 2012	Fred Van Lente	Neil Edwards
Marvel's Iron Man 2	2	November 7, 2012	December 5, 2012	Christos Gage	Ramon Rosanas
Marvel's Thor	2	January 16, 2013	February 20, 2013	Christos Gage	Lan Medina
Marvel's Captain America: The First Avenger	2	November 6, 2013	December 11, 2013	Peter David	Wellinton Alves
Marvel's The Avengers	2	December 24, 2014	January 7, 2015	Will Corona Pilgrim	Joe Bennett
Marvel's Iron Man 3 Prelude	2	January 2, 2013	February 6, 2013	Christos Gage	Steve Kurth
Marvel's Thor: The Dark World Prelude	2	June 5, 2013	July 10, 2013	Craig Kyle and Christopher Yost	Scot Eaton and Ron Lim
Marvel's Captain America: The Winter Soldier Infinite Comic	1	January 28, 2014		Peter David	Rock He-Kim
Marvel's Guardians of the Galaxy Infinite Comic – Dangerous Prey	1	April 1, 2014		Dan Abnett and Andy Lanning	Andrea Di Vito
Marvel's Guardians of the Galaxy Prelude	2	April 2, 2014	May 28, 2014	Dan Abnett and Andy Lanning	Wellinton Alves
Marvel's Avengers: Age of Ultron Prelude – This Scepter'd Isle	1	February 3, 2015		Will Corona Pilgrim	Wellinton Alves
Marvel's Ant-Man Prelude	2	February 4, 2015	March 4, 2015	Will Corona Pilgrim	Miguel Sepulveda
Marvel's Ant-Man – Scott Lang: Small Time	1	March 3, 2015		Will Corona Pilgrim	Wellinton Alves and Daniel Govar
Marvel's Jessica Jones	1	October 7, 2015		Brian Michael Bendis	Michael Gaydos
Marvel's Captain America: Civil War Prelude	4	December 16, 2015	January 27, 2016	Will Corona Pilgrim (Note: References for Will Corona Pilgrim writing various MCU tie-in comics:)	Szymon Kudranski and Lee Ferguson
Marvel's Captain America: Civil War Prelude Infinite Comic	1	February 10, 2016		Will Corona Pilgrim	Lee Ferguson, Goran Sudžuka, and Guillermo Mogorron
Marvel's Doctor Strange Prelude	2	July 6, 2016	August 24, 2016	Will Corona Pilgrim	Jorge Fornés
Marvel's Doctor Strange Prelude Infinite Comic – The Zealot	1	September 7, 2016		Will Corona Pilgrim	Jorge Fornés
Marvel's Guardians of the Galaxy Vol. 2 Prelude	2	January 4, 2017	February 1, 2017	Will Corona Pilgrim	Christopher Allen
Spider-Man: Homecoming Prelude	2	March 1, 2017	April 5, 2017	Will Corona Pilgrim	Todd Nauck
Marvel's Thor: Ragnarok Prelude	4	July 5, 2017	August 16, 2017	Will Corona Pilgrim	J.L. Giles
Marvel's Black Panther Prelude	2	October 18, 2017	November 15, 2017	Will Corona Pilgrim	Annapaola Martello
Marvel's Avengers: Infinity War Prelude	2	December 18, 2017 January 24, 2018	February 5, 2018 February 28, 2018	Will Corona Pilgrim	Tigh Walker and Jorge Fornés
Marvel's Ant-Man and the Wasp Prelude	2	March 7, 2018	April 4, 2018	Will Corona Pilgrim	Chris Allen
Marvel's Captain Marvel Prelude	1	November 14, 2018		Will Corona Pilgrim	Andrea Di Vito
Marvel's Avengers: Endgame Prelude	3	December 5, 2018	February 20, 2019	Will Corona Pilgrim	Paco Diaz
Spider-Man: Far From Home Prelude	2	March 27, 2019	April 24, 2019	Will Corona Pilgrim	Luca Maresca
Marvel's Black Widow Prelude	2	January 15, 2020	February 19, 2020	Peter David	C.F. Villa
Eternals: The 500 Year War	7	January 12, 2022		Dan Abnett, Aki Yanagi, Jongmin Shin, Ju-Yeon Park, David Macho, Rafael Scavone, and Yifan Jiang	Geoffo, Matt Milla, Joe Sabino, Rickie Yagawa, Carlos Macias, Do Gyun Kim, Fernando Sifuentes, Magda Price, Pete Pantazis, Marcio Fiorito, Felipe Sobreiro, and Gunji
Your Friendly Neighborhood Spider-Man	5	December 11, 2024	April 23, 2025	Christos Gage	Eric Gapstur
Fantastic Four: First Steps	1	July 9, 2025		Matt Fraction	Mark Buckingham
Fantastic Four: First Foes	1	March 25, 2026		Dan Slott	Mark Buckingham
Fantastic Four: First Foes – Shalla-Bal	1	July 8, 2026		Charles Soule	Mark Buckingham
Fantastic Four: First Foes – Dragon Man	1	September 30, 2026		Greg Pak	Mark Buckingham
Fantastic Four: First Foes – The Wizard	1	December 9, 2026		Fabian Nicieza	Mark Buckingham
Your Friendly Neighborhood Spider-Man Season 2	4	December 9, 2026	TBA	Christos Gage	Eric Gapstur

=== Adaptations ===
Several comics adapting the story of the films have been released: Iron Man: I Am Iron Man!, an adaptation of Iron Man; Marvel's Iron Man 2, an adaptation of Iron Man 2; Marvel's Thor, an adaptation of Thor; Marvel's Captain America: The First Avenger, an adaptation of Captain America: The First Avenger; Marvel's The Avengers, an adaptation of The Avengers; Marvel's Captain America: Civil War Prelude, an adaptation of both Iron Man 3 and Captain America: The Winter Soldier; Marvel's Guardians of the Galaxy Vol. 2 Prelude, an adaptation of Guardians of the Galaxy, Spider-Man: Homecoming Prelude, an adaptation of Captain America: Civil War; Marvel's Thor: Ragnarok Prelude, an adaptation of both The Incredible Hulk and Thor: The Dark World, Marvel's Ant-Man and the Wasp Prelude, an adaptation of Ant-Man, Marvel's Avengers: Endgame Prelude, an adaptation of Avengers: Infinity War, and Spider-Man: Far From Home Prelude, an adaptation of Spider-Man: Homecoming.

In January 2015, Pilgrim explained the process for adapting films into tie-in comics, noting that scripts and other behind-the-scenes material are referenced in addition to the actual films. Because of this, the adaptations sometimes have new scenes, which Marvel "felt strongly enough" to include as canon, even though they were never filmed. Examples include an interaction between Jasper Sitwell and Nick Fury in Iron Man: I Am Iron Man!, the "Boys Flight Out" sequence from Iron Man 2, where Tony Stark invites James Rhodes to wear the Iron Man Mark II armor, and an additional interaction set during Captain America: Civil War between Peter Parker and his Aunt May in Spider-Man: Homecoming Prelude.

=== Iron Man 2: Public Identity (2010) ===
Decades ago, Howard Stark worked with Anton Vanko to build the first arc reactor, but when Howard realized Vanko's greedy goals, he had him arrested and deported before, at the urging of Obadiah Stane, returning to the business of arms dealing that made him so successful in the past. In the present, Stark's son Tony uses the arc reactor technology to power his Iron Man armor, and after revealing this identity to the world, becomes a public hero. U.S. General Thaddeus Ross commissions Stark's business rival Justin Hammer to build a single-pilot vehicle to replace Iron Man, who has been interfering with and causing trouble for the military. When testing the new vehicle, the pilot crash lands in unfriendly territory, under attack from the Congolese army. Tony saves the airman, but, to the chagrin of Ross, refuses to return the Congolese soldiers' fire. Director Nick Fury and Agent Phil Coulson of S.H.I.E.L.D. later review Stark's actions.

Public Identity was written by Joe Casey and Justin Theroux, with art by Barry Kitson, and the three issues were published on April 28, May 5, and May 12, 2010, respectively. Theroux, who wrote the screenplay for Iron Man 2, was able to show Casey "a fairly finalized script" before the two began work on the tie-in. In May 2010, Alejandro Arbona, who oversaw the creation of the comic, explained that the story of the tie-ins had to come "organically from the stuff that happened in Iron Man —what would happen to a man who'd just revealed his super hero identity to the world?—and it had to move us toward the stuff we knew was going to be important in Iron Man 2". In September 2010, Casey noted that writing an MCU tie-in comic required working within the boundaries of the movie continuity and Marvel Studios' plan, as well as writing the characters as portrayed in the films (the "movie version of Stark has a specific attitude" that Casey tried to put in the comic, for example).

The comic, set after Iron Man but before Iron Man 2 and The Incredible Hulk, was conceived to explain the post-credits scenes of Iron Man and The Incredible Hulk, where Tony Stark meets Nick Fury for the first time but General Ross not for the first time, respectively. Arbona said that "when Tony Stark spoke to General Ross at the end of The Incredible Hulk, you could tell they already knew each other; they spoke about some shared history they'd had together. Well in Iron Man 2: Public Identity you see when they first meet, and what that shared history is." This comic explains that the AI J.A.R.V.I.S. was created in memory of Edwin Jarvis, introduced here as Howard Stark's butler. A younger version of the character appears in Agent Carter, portrayed by James D'Arcy.

=== Iron Man 2: Agents of S.H.I.E.L.D. (2010) ===
Nick Fury plants a S.H.I.E.L.D. agent aboard a Ten Rings-controlled vessel in the Gulf of Aden in an effort to get a live account of Iron Man in action, while Tony Stark is keeping an eye on S.H.I.E.L.D. himself. Phil Coulson monitors the first field operation of a S.H.I.E.L.D. recruit who is tasked with taking down a Ten Rings terrorist cell on American soil, which Coulson later reveals was a set up, a common S.H.I.E.L.D. test for new recruits. Natasha Romanoff infiltrates Stark Industries under the alias of Natalie Rushman, using her spy skills to quickly work her way up the company until she meets with Stark personally.

Agents of S.H.I.E.L.D. was written by Joe Casey and released on September 1, 2010. It consists of three, eight-page stories, each spotlighting a different character: Nick Fury in "Who Made Who", with art by Tim Green; Phil Coulson in "Just Off the Farm", with art by Felix Ruiz; and Natasha Romanoff in "Proximity", with art by Matt Camp. Casey said of the short stories, "The movie studio is very aware of what they're doing, so they paid close attention...It's not exactly the Marvel Universe I grew up with, [but] it's not like the Ultimate universe either. It's a brand new thing, with its own rules and its own continuity."

The end of "Proximity" depicts Romanoff, working undercover in the legal department of Stark Industries, meeting with Tony Stark in his home gym. This is also the scene in Iron Man 2 where the character is introduced, the story therefore acting as a direct prequel / parallel story to the film.

=== Captain America: First Vengeance (2011) ===
In 1944, as he attacks a Hydra base in the Nazi-occupied Danish Straits, Steve Rogers recalls parts of his life that got him to this point: his mother's blessing to become a soldier; his first meeting with Bucky Barnes, who protected him from bullies as a boy; the day after Pearl Harbor was bombed, when Barnes and Rogers decided to enlist; Barnes training Rogers to pass the physical; and the point when Barnes passed the physical but Rogers failed. Johann Schmidt watches Rogers fight, and recalls how he got to this point: meeting Adolf Hitler; capturing Arnim Zola to research creating super soldiers; and finding Abraham Erskine and blackmailing him into continuing his super soldier research under the employ of the Nazis. Howard Stark, via radio, assists Rogers, remembering when he was recruited by Colonel Phillips to join the Strategic Scientific Reserve, and when he helped Peggy Carter rescue Erskine from Schmidt. Dum Dum Dugan and the Howling Commandos arrive to assist Rogers, and they remember their formation—thrust together in a Hydra work camp, forming close friendships after a failed escape attempt. After they defeat the Hydra soldiers, Rogers destroys Schmidt's main weapon at the base, an Asgardian artifact.

First Vengeance was written by Fred Van Lente, with art for the first half of the comic by Neil Edwards, and by Luke Ross for the rest. The first of eight digital issues was released on February 6, 2011, with the other seven subsequently released on February 16, March 2, March 23, June 8, July 6, July 13, and July 20, respectively. The comic was also published in four issues on May 4, May 18, June 15, and June 29, 2011, respectively. On what the comic covers, Captain America: The First Avenger co-producer Stephen Broussard explained that there were "lots of little side stories" that they found fascinating but didn't fit into the story of the film, so the comic allows those to be told. These side stories include some backstory to the film, some action running parallel to the film, and some hints at "things to come", and are "all sort of jumbled up". Van Lente read the film's script, and had his own comic scripts overlooked by Quesada and Broussard, to keep the comic in line with the film. Some of Van Lente's initial ideas, when he felt that he could do anything because of the comic medium, had to be changed due to not fitting into the realistic world of the MCU, a process Van Lente described as "making comics on a budget".

Van Lente stated, "What's neat about the MCU, just like in the comics' universe, is the interconnections between various movies, particularly Iron Man 2 and Thor. You'll start to see those coming out in First Vengeance." On the differences between the MCU and original versions of the characters, Van Lente noted that when Joe Simon and Jack Kirby originally created Captain America, they "didn't have 20/20 hindsight to see how things would fit together with the Marvel characters to follow. With the MCU, we're able to make those connections and heighten all of the characters' weight."

=== Marvel's The Avengers Prelude: Fury's Big Week (2012) ===
Fury's Big Week was written by Christopher Yost and Eric Pearson, and was released digitally in eight issues, on February 5 (tying-into the wider The Avengers marketing campaign, which released a new trailer on that day), February 14, February 21, February 28, March 5, March 12, March 19, and March 26, 2012, respectively. The comic was published in hard copy as four issues on March 7, March 21, April 4, and April 18, 2012, respectively. The comic retells the events of The Incredible Hulk, Iron Man 2, Thor, and Captain America: The First Avenger from the point-of-view of S.H.I.E.L.D., with extra scenes added to weave them all together.

=== Marvel's The Avengers: Black Widow Strikes (2012) ===
Natasha Romanoff is taken by surprise in Russia when her target is killed by a "fan" of hers named Sofia. Breaking contact with her S.H.I.E.L.D. superiors, Romanoff begins a competition with Sofia for the mantle of the "Black Widow", discovering that Sofia's employer is selling the parts for a new missile to the Ten Rings. Romanoff tracks Sofia to a missile launch site targeting North Korea, where she stalls long enough for S.H.I.E.L.D. to intervene. Sofia is killed in the ensuing chaos.

Written by Fred Van Lente, with art by Neil Edwards, the comic (which is set in Romanoff's native Russia) first appeared in copies of the Maxim Russia magazine, before being released as a traditional, three-issue comic series on May 2, May 16, and June 6, 2012, respectively. The decision was made to give Romanoff her own comic ahead of The Avengers because Marvel felt that she "remains the most enigmatic of the Avengers" despite appearing in previous films. Van Lente explained the relationship between Black Widow Strikes and the films by saying, "This is on the same scale as the Marvel movies. We're working closely with Marvel Studios to have it integrate seamlessly with the Marvel Cinematic Universe. Once this is over, they're welcome to use any of my ideas here for a movie." Van Lente took inspiration "from Joss Whedon's script for Marvel's the Avengers, which I was lucky enough to read. He does a good job making her inclusion on the team perfectly believable."

Black Widow Strikes is set between Iron Man 2 and The Avengers, and deals with "some loose ends from Iron Man 2, namely some bootleg Stark technology that Justin Hammer made. The idea of the "Black Widow" being more of a mantle than the codename of a single agent is further explored in Agent Carter, where an early Black Widow training program is introduced, and in Avengers: Age of Ultron, where some of Romanoff's training is shown through flashbacks.

=== Marvel's Iron Man 3 Prelude (2013) ===
Tony Stark becomes occupied as he begins construction of Stark Tower in New York, so James Rhodes picks up where Iron Man left off in the fight against the Ten Rings terrorist organization. After 10 months of skirmishes across the world, Rhodes is ambushed in Hong Kong by Ten Rings agents with Hammer Technology, including a nuclear powered tank. Rhodes manages to get the tank out of the city before the insurgents detonate its power source, and returns to America in time to find the aftermath of the Battle of New York. Later, Tony reveals to Rhodes his plans for an Iron Legion, and a Ten Rings operative reports to his master, The Mandarin, informing him that they have full scans of the Stark Technology in Rhodes's suit.

Iron Man 3 Prelude was written by Christos Gage, with art by Steve Kurth, with the first issue released on January 2, 2013, and the second on February 6.

=== Marvel's Thor: The Dark World Prelude (2013) ===
In the year following the destruction of the Bifrost, the Asgardian means of transportation throughout the cosmos, both the nine realms and nearby planets have fallen into chaos, while astrophysicist Jane Foster has failed in her attempts to re-open a wormhole in New Mexico, an action requiring the Bifrost to be functional. When the presumed dead Loki attacks Earth and steals the Tesseract, Odin uses the secret, dangerous power of Dark Energy to send Thor to intervene. Following the Battle of New York, Thor returns to Asgard with Loki and the Tesseract. Loki is imprisoned in the dungeons to serve a life sentence, while Thor uses the Tesseract's power to repair the Bifrost and allow Asgard to bring order back to the nine realms and beyond.

Thor: The Dark World Prelude was written by Craig Kyle and Christopher Yost, with the first issue released on June 5, 2013, with art by Scot Eaton, and the second on July 10 with art by Ron Lim.

=== Marvel's Captain America: The Winter Soldier Infinite Comic (2014) ===
Following the Battle of New York, Steve Rogers is working with Natasha Romanoff and Brock Rumlow for S.H.I.E.L.D. When a terrorist group steals the Zodiac virus from S.H.I.E.L.D., the team track them to Willis Tower in Chicago where they take them out and recover the virus.

Peter David writes Captain America: The Winter Soldier Infinite Comic, with art by Rock-He Kim. The comic was published on January 28, 2014, and sees David set up key themes for Captain America: The Winter Soldier: "Black Widow and Rumlow...They're okay with doing what they're told. Cap, however, is way more suspicious and wants a clearer idea of what's going on, and is annoyed that S.H.I.E.L.D. isn't big on being forthcoming." On Cap's relationships with new partners Black Widow and Brock Rumlow, "I think he sees her as a valued ally, but [he] tends to be suspicious of the outfit that she works for. He trusts her as someone to have his back in a fight, but I think also believes that if S.H.I.E.L.D. told her to put a knife in his back, she would do so without hesitation, and that can be problematic. Rumlow, meantime, is an eager partner, but Cap doesn't trust him at all. First, there's the suspicion aspect. And second, I think Cap is still gun-shy because the last time he had a partner, Bucky wound up dying—or at least so he believes—and he's not anxious for history to repeat itself."

The Zodiac virus featured heavily in the comic was first introduced to the MCU in the Marvel One-Shot Agent Carter, where it is recovered by the titular character for the SSR, the precursor to S.H.I.E.L.D.

=== Marvel's Guardians of the Galaxy Infinite Comic – Dangerous Prey (2014) ===
With one Infinity Stone, the Aether, in his possession, the Collector actively searches for the other five, and when he discovers the Orb to be on a desolate planet, he hires the assassin Gamora to retrieve it.

Dan Abnett and Andy Lanning, who revived the Guardians of the Galaxy series in 2008, agreed to write the tie-in comic preludes to the film Guardians of the Galaxy, as a favor to director James Gunn. The Infinite Comic was released on April 1, 2014, and features art by Andrea De Vito.

=== Marvel's Guardians of the Galaxy Prelude (2014) ===
Issue 1 sees Nebula, while searching for the Orb, remembering growing up with Gamora and their father, Thanos, as well as her recent experiences with Ronan the Accuser. Issue 2 follows Rocket and Groot as bounty hunters in the lead-up to Guardians of the Galaxy.

This film prelude was also written by Dan Abnett and Andy Lanning, with Lanning writing the plots based on brainstormed ideas, and Abnett writing the final scripts. With art by Wellinton Alves, the issues were published on April 2 and May 28, 2014, respectively. The stories were intended to flesh out the history of the film characters based on the details in Gunn's script, while Abnett also attempted to bridge the feeling of the film with that of the original comics. Speaking on working with familiar characters, but now the film versions of them, Abnett said, "[It's] Fun, but a little odd. The characters of the Prelude comics had to fit very cleanly to the movie versions so there wasn't quite the same opportunity for madcap invention...I had to make sure the tone fitted precisely." Lanning said, "There's a definite distinction between the Marvel comic universe and the Marvel Cinematic universe...[but] these characters are not so distant to their comic counterparts as to be unrecognizable, they are more like an alternate version, similar to what the Ultimate Universe did."

=== Marvel's Avengers: Age of Ultron Prelude – This Scepter'd Isle (2015) ===
Following the Battle of New York, a disgruntled S.H.I.E.L.D. scientist studying Loki's scepter and its connection to the Tesseract is recruited by Hydra to steal the scepter. With it in the possession of high-ranking Hydra member Baron Wolfgang von Strucker, Hydra begins experimenting on the scepter, eventually using it to unlock special abilities within two volunteers, the twins Pietro and Wanda Maximoff.

Released on February 3, 2015, this comic is written by Pilgrim and illustrated by Wellinton Alves.

=== Marvel's Ant-Man Prelude (2015) ===
During the Cold War, when Howard Stark demands the Pym Particle Suit, created to shrink its wearer, from S.H.I.E.L.D. scientist Hank Pym to take down radicals in Soviet-occupied Germany who are reverse-engineering Hydra technology, Pym insists on carrying out the mission himself to keep his invention out of the wrong hands. Crossing the Berlin Wall and infiltrating the enemy compound, Pym discovers the plans for Hydra memory suppression technology, and makes his way to a secret lab where the reverse-engineered machine is being tested. Taking out the radicals using the suit's size-changing properties, Pym destroys the technology so that no one can use it. Pym then decides to continue taking missions for S.H.I.E.L.D.

Ant-Man Prelude was written by Pilgrim and illustrated by Miguel Sepulveda, with the two issues released on February 4 and March 4, 2015, respectively. The comic was conceived to show Pym using the suit and to explain the quandary that comes with having his technology, to lead up to the film. Though a specific year that the comic takes place in is never specified, Pilgrim explained that it is set in the mid-1980s, when Mikhail Gorbachev served as Soviet leader. Pilgrim described the comic as a "spy action story" with some "thriller elements". Pilgrim wanted the comic to feature the Berlin Wall prominently following a childhood experience with an exhibit recreating part of it.

Hydra's interest in and experimentation with memory suppression technology was previously explored in the film Captain America: The Winter Soldier and the television series Agents of S.H.I.E.L.D. and Agent Carter.

=== Marvel's Ant-Man – Scott Lang: Small Time (2015) ===
After discovering that his employer is illegally overcharging its customers, and failing to expose the crime thanks to his boss's influence in the media, Scott Lang decides to steal the company's money and return it to the customers. During the robbery, Lang gets carried away and attempts to steal his boss's personal property, including his car. After accidentally crashing the car, Lang is caught and eventually imprisoned.

An infinite comic written by Pilgrim, with art by Wellinton Alves and Daniel Govar, Scott Lang: Small Time was released on March 3, 2015.

=== Marvel's Jessica Jones (2015) ===
After being beaten by Daredevil, Turk Barrett is visited in the hospital by private investigator Jessica Jones, who has been hired by one of Barrett's baby mamas to get money from him to support their child.

Prior to the release of Marvel's Jessica Jones television series, a Jessica Jones one-shot was released digitally on October 7, 2015, written by Brian Michael Bendis with art by Michael Gaydos, the original creators of the character. David Mack also returns from the original comic Alias as the cover artist. Print versions of the comic were exclusively handed out at New York Comic Con 2015. Bendis explained that the one-shot "is in the Marvel TV universe and it celebrates the new show".

The comic explores "the connective tissue that will build between the series", by having Daredevil appear in a Jessica Jones story.

=== Marvel's Captain America: Civil War Prelude Infinite Comic – Crossroads (2016) ===
Following the defeat of Hydra at the Triskelion, Bucky Barnes / Winter Soldier hunts down and kills his remaining Hydra handlers before going on the run. Months later, Brock Rumlow awakes from a coma and learns of Hydra's defeat and the death of his leader, Alexander Pierce, deciding to head out on his own. After the Battle of Sokovia years later, Captain America is balancing his personal search for Barnes with his duties as leader of the new Avengers. The former leads him and the team to Nigeria, where instead of Barnes they find Rumlow, now going by 'Crossbones'.

Written by Pilgrim, "Crossroads" was released on February 10, 2016. The comic is told from the perspective of three different characters, Bucky Barnes / Winter Soldier, Brock Rumlow / Crossbones, and Steve Rogers / Captain America, with art for each perspective provided by Lee Ferguson, Goran Sudžuka, and Guillermo Mogorron, respectively.

=== Marvel's Doctor Strange Prelude (2016) ===
The Masters of the Mystic Arts – Kaecilius, Wong, Tina Minoru and Daniel Drumm – pursue a woman as she attacks several landmarks around London with a stolen dark sceptre, a powerful artifact. The arrogant Kaecilius attempts to subdue the woman himself, but it takes the combined power of the masters to overcome the sceptre's magic. After reclaiming it, the Masters store the relic in their New York Sanctum with others like it. Another Master, Mordo, and their teacher, the Ancient One, face a Chinese group who have discovered the powerful Arrow of Apollon and plan to use it to gain power over innocent civilians. They also successfully retrieve the artifact, and it is placed in the Sanctum as well.

Written by Pilgrim, with art by Jorge Fornés, the two-issues of the Doctor Strange prelude were released on July 6 and August 24, 2016, respectively.

=== Marvel's Doctor Strange Prelude Infinite Comic – The Zealot (2016) ===
This Prelude Infinite Comic, centered on Kaecilius, was released on September 7, 2016.

=== Marvel's Black Panther Prelude (2017) ===
This comic tells the story of how T'Challa first became the Black Panther, protector of the isolationist country Wakanda, a story not yet told in the MCU.

The comic is set nearly a decade before the film Black Panther, around the end of the first Iron Man film, and reveals that T'Challa has been acting as the Black Panther since then, making him that hero for almost a decade before his film introduction in Captain America: Civil War.

=== Marvel's Avengers: Infinity War Prelude (2018) ===
The first comic tells the present whereabouts of all the Avengers after the events of Civil War and Thor: Ragnarok.

The second comic provides an overview of the whereabouts of all the Infinity Stones shown in the MCU up to that point, leading to Avengers: Infinity War.

=== Marvel's Captain Marvel Prelude (2018) ===
The one-shot comic, called "The Peacekeepers", follows Nick Fury and Maria Hill between the events of Age of Ultron and Infinity War.

=== Marvel's Black Widow Prelude (2020) ===
This comic retells Natasha Romanoff's history, including events from the films Iron Man 2, The Avengers, Captain America: The Winter Soldier, Avengers: Age of Ultron, and Captain America: Civil War, as told by Councilwoman Hawley and Secretary Thaddeus Ross.

=== Eternals: The 500 Year War (2022) ===
This infinite comic is a series of flashbacks set during Eternals (2021), set in 1520. The series is available only on Marvel Unlimited and WEBTOON.

=== Your Friendly Neighborhood Spider-Man (2024) ===
In September 2024, Marvel Comics announced a five-issue comic book prequel series for the Marvel Studios Animation series Your Friendly Neighborhood Spider-Man, also titled Your Friendly Neighborhood Spider-Man, written by Christos Gage and with art by Eric Gapstur. This is set in an alternate universe, outside of the MCU's "Sacred Timeline". The first issue was released in December 2024.

=== Fantastic Four: First Steps (2025) ===
In April 2025, Marvel Comics and Marvel Studios announced a tie-in one-shot comic for The Fantastic Four: First Steps, titled Fantastic Four: First Steps, to be released on July 9, 2025. The comic is written by Matt Fraction and drawn by Mark Buckingham, with cover art by Phil Noto. Marvel Comics worked closely with Marvel Studios and the creatives to ensure the comic had the same style and tone as the film, with the comics creators visiting the set during filming. The in-universe comic was meant to be published by the Future Foundation with the "first-ever authorized retelling of the Fantastic Four's early adventures", coinciding with the fourth anniversary of the team gaining their powers.

=== Fantastic Four: First Foes (2026) ===
In December 2025, Marvel Comics announced four additional tie-in one-shot comics that, similar to the First Steps one-shot, are presented as in-universe comics published by the Future Foundation and expand on characters and moments from the film. The first one-shot, titled Fantastic Four: First Foes, released on March 25, 2026. It was written by Dan Slott, with Buckingham and Noto respectively returning as artist and cover artist, and explores an early adventure of the Fantastic Four facing off against René Rodin / Mad Thinker. A two-page short story written by Ryan North, "Fantastic Science", is also included, which is inspired by Reed Richards's educational television programming as seen in the film.

=== Fantastic Four: First Foes – Shalla-Bal (2026) ===
The second Fantastic Four: First Steps one-shot comic, Fantastic Four: First Foes – Shalla-Bal, was released on July 8, 2026. It focuses on how Shalla-Bal became Galactus's herald, the Silver Surfer, before the events of the film. The one-shot is written by Charles Soule, with Buckingham and Noto once again respectively returning as artist and cover artist. A new "Fantastic Science" short story written by North is also included.

=== Fantastic Four: First Foes – Dragon Man (2026) ===
The third Fantastic Four: First Steps one-shot comic, Fantastic Four: First Foes – Dragon Man, is scheduled for release on September 30, 2026. It sees Ben Grimm struggling with his rocky form as a potential cure for his condition emerges and involves the android Dragon Man. The one-shot is written by Greg Pak with Buckingham and Noto once again returning as artist and cover artist.

=== Fantastic Four: First Foes – The Wizard (2026) ===
The fourth and final Fantastic Four: First Steps one-shot comic, Fantastic Four: First Foes – The Wizard, is scheduled for release on December 9, 2026. It sees the Fantastic Four facing off against Bentley Wittman / Wizard and his newly assembled team, the Frightful Four, as they plan to steal the Baxter Building itself. The one-shot is written by Fabian Nicieza with Buckingham and Noto once again returning as artist and cover artist.

=== Your Friendly Neighborhood Spider-Man Season 2 (2026) ===
In September 2026, Marvel Comics announced a four-issue comic book prequel series for the second season of the Marvel Studios Animation series Your Friendly Neighborhood Spider-Man, written by Christos Gage and with art by Eric Gapstur who return from the last prequel series. The series is set between the first and second season. The first issue is set to be released on December 9, 2026.

== Recurring characters ==
This table includes characters who have appeared in multiple MCU tie-in comics, headlining at least one.

Character	First appearance	Notes
Phil Coulson	Iron Man: I Am Iron Man!	Coulson was introduced to the MCU in Iron Man, and is portrayed in live-action by Clark Gregg.
Nick Fury	Iron Man: I Am Iron Man!	Fury was introduced to the MCU in Iron Man, and is portrayed in live-action by Samuel L. Jackson.
James "Rhodey" Rhodes War Machine	Iron Man: I Am Iron Man!	Rhodes was introduced to the MCU in Iron Man, where he was portrayed by Terrence Howard before being recast, with Don Cheadle playing the character in subsequent MCU films.
Steve Rogers Captain America	Captain America: First Vengeance	Rogers was introduced to the MCU in Captain America: The First Avenger, and is portrayed in live-action by Chris Evans.
Natasha Romanoff Black Widow	Iron Man 2: Agents of S.H.I.E.L.D.	Romanoff was introduced to the MCU in Iron Man 2, and is portrayed in live-action by Scarlett Johansson.
Tony Stark Iron Man	Iron Man: I Am Iron Man!	Stark was introduced to the MCU in Iron Man, and is portrayed in live-action by Robert Downey Jr..
Thor	The Avengers Prelude: Fury's Big Week	Thor was introduced to the MCU in Thor, and is portrayed in live-action by Chris Hemsworth.

== Reception ==
=== Sales ===
The following table lists the known retail sales figures of the collected editions.

Title	Publication date	US retail sales	US revenue (est.)	Ref.
Iron Man: I Am Iron Man!	April 14, 2010	1,600	$27,184	
Captain America: First Vengeance	July 20, 2011	2,500	$37,475	
Road to Marvel's The Avengers	March 28, 2012	1,900	$47,481	
The Avengers Prelude: Fury's Big Week	May 16, 2012	2,100	$31,479	
The Avengers Prelude: Black Widow Strikes	September 19, 2012	1,800	$23,382	
Thor: The Dark World Prelude	October 22, 2013	1,700	$25,483	
Captain America: The Winter Soldier Prelude	April 1, 2014	1,755	$26,307	
Guardians of the Galaxy Prelude	April 7, 2014	4,516	$67,695	
Marvel's The Avengers: Age of Ultron Prelude	April 7, 2015	2,955	$50,205	
Marvel's Ant-Man Prelude	June 23, 2015	2,373	$35,571	
Marvel's Captain America: Civil War Prelude	April 19, 2016	1,750	$27,983	
Marvel's Doctor Strange Prelude	October 11, 2016	2,005	$34,065	
Spider-Man: Homecoming Prelude	June 20, 2017	1,807	$27,087	
Marvel's Avengers: Infinity War Prelude	April 4, 2018	3,476	$55,581	
Total		32,237	$516,978	

=== Critical response ===
Jesse Schedeen of IGN gave Public Identity a score of 7.2 out of 10, calling it "far more successful than [previous comic tie-ins]", but criticizing the inconsistent artwork and connections to the wider universe that he found to be irrelevant to the comic's plot. Chad Nevett of Comic Book Resources gave a less positive review, assigning 2 out of 5 stars to the comic, and stating that "The plot has potential and the characters' voices are spot-on with the movie versions", however, "the lack of likenesses to the actors is a little off-putting, the art also suffers from inconsistency... It's a solid comic that's overwhelmed by small problems."

Nevett, again for Comic Book Resources, gave Agents of S.H.I.E.L.D. a much more positive review, giving it 4 out of 5 stars, and particularly praising the artwork, while also appreciating the consistent voice throughout the three stories from writer Casey.

At IGN, Schedeen scored First Vengeance 7 out of 10, calling the issues "enjoyable methods of passing the time until [Captain America: The First Avenger releases]". David Hawkins, writing for What Culture, gave the series 3 stars out of 5, calling it "a marketing ploy that has moments of tremendous merit", and singled out Luke Ross's artwork for the third issue as particularly praise-worthy.

Fury's Big Week received praise from CJ Wheeler of Den of Geek, who thought the tone of the series was "a perfect fit for the Marvel Cinematic Universe so far and will get you stoked for what's to come."

Matthew Peterson of Major Spoilers gave Black Widow Strikes a score of 2.5 stars out of 5, and the verdict "An average tale with no major missteps" – he thought that "Writer Van Lente did all that he could to make this feel cinematic, driven and squarely in the Marvel movie universe", but was somewhat disappointed in the final result, and criticized the shifting art styles, before surmising that "In many ways, it's the ultimate example of a movie tie-in, designed to please fans of both the graphic and live-action Widow without irritation or unwanted questions."

James Hunt of Comic Book Resources found the Iron Man 3 Prelude to be "dull and disappointing", calling the building of stakes around untouchable characters, like War Machine, a mistake, and criticizing the "rushed or phoned in" artwork. Noel Thorne, writing for What Culture, also found the prelude disappointing, calling it a "cheaply put-together cash-grab" and "not even remotely entertaining", and lamented the lack of actual connections with Iron Man 3.

For IGN, Schedeen gave Issue #1 of the Thor: The Dark World Prelude a score of 6 out of 10, stating that it "fails to offer a cohesive story or enough compelling material to justify a purchase", and Issue #2 a score of 5 out of 10, calling it "a dull, pointless lead-in to the next Thor movie". He criticized the focus of the series for serving as an explanation for "nitpicky questions" rather than being an actual lead in to the story of the film, and he found the artwork to be "awkward", "flat and dull". "Jay" at Comic Frontline had similar feelings, scoring the comic 3 stars out of 5, stating that, though he liked the issues, and "thought they were solid", he felt they were more like "deleted scenes from the Avengers than a Thor prequel", and they "could have been trimmed down into one issue", rather than being "stretched out to fit two issues just to drain fan's pockets". He was more positive about the artwork, however, calling the work of Scot Eaton and Ron Lim "beautiful", and praising the work of inkers Andrew Hennessy and Rick Magyar for making the different artwork appear consistent across issues.

Ian Gowan of ComicSpectrum gave the Captain America: The Winter Soldier Infinite Comic a rating of 3.5 out of 5, calling it "fun but also [a] little light on story" and stating that it increased his excitement for the movie. He found the artwork "serviceable", but stated that the "colored pencil artwork doesn't work...as well in digital comic as it does in a print comic."

Doug Zawisza of Comic Book Resources scored the Guardians of the Galaxy Infinite Comic 3.5 stars out of 5, stating that "While it doesn't openly spoil anything from the upcoming movie, it does flaunt the cards being held in the movie's hand quite a bit." He found the artwork to be "better than pedestrian", but felt the Infinite Comic format was not used to its full potential. A columnist for Cosmic Book News gave an almost entirely positive review of the comic, criticizing only its short length, and highlighting the return of writers Dan Abnett and Andy Lanning to the Guardians of the Galaxy characters as a particularly praise-worthy aspect of the issues.

Zawisza, again for Comic Book Resources, had similar feelings about the Guardians of the Galaxy Prelude, giving it 3.5 stars out of 5 as well, believing it was in "the same spirit as the volume of "Guardians of the Galaxy" that inspired the film's cast of characters", and leading him to surmise that he wanted more, as long as Abnett and Lanning would return as writers. He had high praise for the artwork as well, calling it "very well drawn, showcasing Wellinton Alves's ability to craft worlds and create distinguishable characters".

Schedeen scored Ant-Man Prelude #1 a 6.8 out of 10, indicating an 'okay' comic, stating that "once you ignore the movie connection and just treat this as an Ant-man comic, it doesn't have a great deal to offer", noting that Sepulveda's artwork is inconsistent, and criticizing the lack of similarity between the characters and their live-action counterparts. Zawisza scored the issue 3 stars out of 5, saying that Pilgrim "keeps everyone safe", Sepulveda's artwork is "serviceable", and that "this isn't ground-breaking comics, but it doesn't have to be. It's DVD-style bonus material for the most dedicated fans of the Marvel Cinematic Universe." For the second issue, Schedeen reiterated his previous sentiments. Calling it "unfulfilling", he scored the issue a 5.8 out of 10.

== Marvel Cinematic Universe-inspired titles ==
These comics are simply inspired by the films, and are not considered part of the MCU continuity.

Title	No. of Issues	Publication date(s)		Writer(s)	Artist(s)
Title	No. of Issues	First published	Last published	Writer(s)	Artist(s)
Iron Man: Fast Friends	2	September 17, 2008	September 30, 2008	Paul Tobin	Ronan Cliquet
Fast Friends explores the friendship between Tony Stark and James Rhodes.
The Incredible Hulk: The Fury Files	2	October 9, 2008	October 15, 2008	Frank Tieri	Salvadore Espin
Serving as a prequel to The Incredible Hulk, Tieri believed at the time of its release that the comic was tied into the MCU, but it has since been ignored as the MCU continuity has expanded.
Nick Fury: Spies Like Us	1	December 4, 2008		Joe Caramagna	Hugo Petrus
A spy story featuring Nick Fury, it was released in the compilation book Iron Man/Hulk/Fury, which also included Iron Man: Fast Friends and The Incredible Hulk: The Fury Files.
Iron Man 2: Fist of Iron	1	November 30, 2010		Paul Tobin	Patrick Olliffe, Scott Koblish and Khoi Pham
An Audi promotional comic that was released for free on the Marvel Comics app, which features Tony Stark stopping thieves on the way to a business meeting.
Captain America & Thor: Avengers	1	July 6, 2011		Fred Van Lente	Ron Lim
A collection of two stories that take some inspiration from the films Captain America: The First Avenger and Thor: "U-Base", which sees Captain America and his Howling Commandos strike a Hydra U-base during World War II; and "Citadel of Spires", featuring Thor, Sif, and Loki on a mission to save Fandral.
The Avengers Initiative	1	May 2, 2012		Fred Van Lente	Ron Lim
An all-ages introduction to the Avengers in the lead up to The Avengers' premiere, featuring an individual accessing S.H.I.E.L.D. archives and Nick Fury's assessments of the Avengers.
Iron Man: The Coming of the Melter	1	May 1, 2013		Christos Gage	Ron Lim
Iron Man and War Machine team up to defeat the Melter, a villain who has developed a similar power suit.
Captain America: Homecoming	1	March 26, 2014		Fred Van Lente	Tom Grummett
Inspired by the MCU films The Avengers and Captain America: The Winter Soldier, it follows Steve Rogers / Captain America and Natasha Romanoff / Black Widow as they fight terrorists in New York.
Guardians of the Galaxy: Galaxy's Most Wanted	1	July 2, 2014		Will Corona Pilgrim	Andrea Di Vito
An adventure featuring Rocket Raccoon and Groot, inspired by the film Guardians of the Galaxy.
Agents of S.H.I.E.L.D.: The Chase	1	July 25, 2014		George Kitson	Mirko Colak, Neil Edwards, and Mirco Pierfederici
Marvel Custom Solutions and Lexus released a limited single-issue comic tie-in to Agents of S.H.I.E.L.D. for the 2014 San Diego Comic-Con, inspired by the episode "Seeds".
Avengers: Operation Hydra	1	April 22, 2015		Will Corona Pilgrim	Andrea Di Vito
Inspired by The Avengers and Captain America: The Winter Soldier, Operation Hydra depicts the Avengers coming together to fight Hydra, and explores Hawkeye's relationship with the team.
Ant-Man: Larger Than Life	1	June 24, 2015		Will Corona Pilgrim	Andrea Di Vito
A prequel to the film Ant-Man, it follows a young Hank Pym's experiments controlling ants.
Captain America: Road to War	1	April 20, 2016		Will Corona Pilgrim	Andrea Di Vito
A prequel to the film Captain America: Civil War, it sees Captain America and Black Widow train the new Avengers to fight the robot Ultimo.
Doctor Strange: Mystic Apprentice	1	October 26, 2016		Will Corona Pilgrim	Andrea Di Vito
A story concurrent to the film Doctor Strange, it sees Doctor Strange in Kamar-Taj attempting to tap into his astral form.

== Collected editions ==
Title	Collected material	Publication date	ISBN
Iron Man: I Am Iron Man!	Iron Man: I Am Iron Man! #1–2, Iron Man: Security Measures #1, Iron Man #200	April 14, 2010	0785145583
Iron Man 2: Public Identity	Iron Man 2: Public Identity #1–3, Iron Man 2: Fist of Iron #1, Iron Man 2: Agents of S.H.I.E.L.D. #1	October 13, 2010	0785148582
Captain America: First Vengeance	Captain America: First Vengeance #1–4	July 20, 2011	0785157255
Road to Marvel's The Avengers	Iron Man: I Am Iron Man! #1–2, Iron Man 2: Agents of S.H.I.E.L.D. #1, Iron Man 2: Public Identity #1–3, Captain America: First Vengeance #1–4	March 28, 2012	0785162372
The Avengers Prelude: Fury's Big Week	The Avengers Prelude: Fury's Big Week #1–4	May 16, 2012	0785163417
The Avengers Prelude: Black Widow Strikes	The Avengers Prelude: Black Widow Strikes #1–3, Tales of Suspense #52	September 19, 2012	0785165681
The Avengers Initiative	Captain America & Thor: Avengers #1, The Avengers Initiative #1	October 10, 2012	0785166149
Iron Man 3 Prelude	Iron Man 2 #1–2, Iron Man 3 Prelude #1–2, Iron Man (2005) #1	April 9, 2013	0785165517
Thor: The Dark World Prelude	Thor #1–2, Thor: The Dark World Prelude #1–2, Thor: God of Thunder #13	October 22, 2013	0785153780
Captain America: The Winter Soldier Prelude	Captain America: The First Avenger #1–2, Captain America: The Winter Soldier Infinite Comic #1, Captain America (1968) #117, Captain America (2005) #6, The Ultimates #2, Material from Tales of Suspense #57	April 1, 2014	0785188770
Guardians of the Galaxy Prelude	Guardians of the Galaxy Prelude #1–2, Guardians of the Galaxy Prelude Infinite Comic (– Dangerous Prey) #1, Iron Man (1968) #55, Strange Tales (1951) #181, Incredible Hulk (1968) #271, Material from Tales to Astonish (1959) #13, Marvel Preview #4	April 7, 2014	0785154108
Marvel's The Avengers: Age of Ultron Prelude	Marvel's The Avengers #1–2, Avengers: (Age of Ultron Prelude – This Scepter'd Isle) Cinematic Infinite Comic #1, Avengers (1963) #57–58, Avengers (1998) #22, Avengers 12.1	April 7, 2015	0785193553
Marvel's Ant-Man Prelude	Marvel's Ant-Man Prelude #1–2, Marvel's Ant-Man – Scott Lang: Small Time MCU Infinite Comic #1, Marvel Premiere #47–48, Ant-Man (2015) #1, Age of Ultron 10AI	June 23, 2015	0785197982
Marvel's Captain America: Civil War Prelude	Marvel's Captain America: Civil War Prelude #1–4, Civil War: Cinematic Infinite Comic #1, Civil War #1	April 19, 2016	0785194401
Marvel's Doctor Strange Prelude	Marvel's Doctor Strange Prelude #1–2, Marvels Doctor Strange Prelude Infinite Comic (– The Zealot) #1, Doctor Strange: The Oath #1, Doctor Strange (2015) #1, Strange Tales #110, 115, Marvel Premiere #14	October 11, 2016	1302901095
Marvel's Guardians of the Galaxy Vol. 2 Prelude	Marvel's Guardians of the Galaxy Vol. 2 Prelude #1–2, Giant-Size Avengers #4, Guardians of the Galaxy (1990) #1, Guardians Team-Up #1–2	April 18, 2017	130290468X
Spider-Man: Homecoming Prelude	Spider-Man: Homecoming Prelude #1–2, Invincible Iron Man (2008) #7, Amazing Spider-Man (1963) #2	June 20, 2017	1302905163
Marvel's Thor: Ragnarok Prelude	Marvel's Thor: Ragnarok Prelude #1–4, Thor (1966) #361, Incredible Hulk (2000) #95	October 17, 2017	0785194606
Marvel Super Heroes: Larger Than Life	Avengers: Operation Hydra #1, Ant-Man: Larger Than Life #1, Captain America: Road to War #1, Doctor Strange: Mystic Apprentice #1, Guardians of the Galaxy: Dream On #1, Spider-Man: Master Plan #1	December 12, 2017	1302908898
Marvel's Black Panther Prelude	Marvel's Black Panther Prelude #1–2, Jungle Action (1972) #6–7, Black Panther (2005) #2, Black Panther (2016) #1, material from Black Panther (1998) #19	January 10, 2018	1302909428
Marvel's Avengers: Infinity War Prelude	Marvel's Avengers: Infinity War Prelude #1–2, Infinity #1, Thanos Annual #1	April 4, 2018	1302909436
Marvel's Ant-Man and the Wasp Prelude	Marvel's Ant-Man and the Wasp Prelude #1–2, Avengers (1963) #195–196, Avengers Origins: Ant-Man and the Wasp, Astonishing Ant-Man #1	June 5, 2018	1302909444
The Marvel Cinematic Universe: The Marvel Comics Omnibus	Iron Man: I Am Iron Man #1–2; Iron Man 2: Agents of S.H.I.E.L.D. #1; Iron Man 2: Public Identity #1–3; Iron Man 2 Adaptation #1–2; Thor Adaptation #1–2; Captain America: First Vengeance #1–4; Captain America: The First Avenger Adaptation #1–2; The Avengers Prelude: Fury's Big Week #1–4; The Avengers: Black Widow Strikes #1–3; The Avengers #1–2; Iron Man 3 Prelude #1–2; Thor: The Dark World Prelude #1–2; Captain America: The Winter Soldier Infinite Comic #1; Guardians of the Galaxy Prelude #1–2; Guardians of the Galaxy Prequel Infinite Comic #1; Avengers: Age of Ultron Prelude Infinite Comic #1; Ant-Man Prelude #1–2; Ant-Man Infinite Comic #1; Captain America: Civil War Prelude #1–4; Captain America: Civil War Prelude Infinite Comic #1; Doctor Strange Prelude #1–2; Doctor Strange Prelude Infinite Comic #1; Guardians of the Galaxy Vol. 2 Prelude #1–2; Spider-Man: Homecoming Prelude #1–2; Thor: Ragnarok Prelude #1–4; Black Panther Prelude #1–2; Avengers: Infinity War Prelude #1–2; Ant-Man and the Wasp Prelude #1–2	October 3, 2018	1302913239
Marvel's Captain Marvel Prelude	Marvel's Captain Marvel Prelude #1–2, Marvel Super-Heroes (1967) #13, Ms. Marvel (1977) #1, Ms. Marvel (2006) #1, Captain Marvel (2012) #1, Generations: Captain Marvel & Captain Mar-Vell, Life of Captain Marvel (2018)	February 19, 2019	1302914944
Marvel's Avengers: Endgame Prelude	Marvel's Avengers: Endgame Prelude #1–3, Infinity Gauntlet (1991) #1, Guardians of the Galaxy (2015) #9	April 2, 2019	1302914952
Spider-Man: Far From Home Prelude	Spider-Man: Far From Home Prelude #1–2, Amazing Spider-Man (1963) #95, #311, Amazing Spider-Man (2015) #9–10	June 4, 2019	1302917854
Marvel's Black Widow Prelude	Marvel's Black Widow Prelude #1–2, Avengers (1963) #43, #196, Web of Black Widow #1, material from Tales of Suspense (1959) #52–53	April 7, 2020	1302921088
Your Friendly Neighborhood Spider-Man: Old School/New School	Your Friendly Neighborhood Spider-Man #1–5	August 26, 2025	9781302961466
