= Features of the Marvel Cinematic Universe =

The Marvel Cinematic Universe (MCU) media franchise features many elements, including locations, weapons, and artifacts. Many are based on elements that originally appeared in the American comic books published by Marvel Comics, while others were created for the MCU.

== Living beings ==
=== Earth animals ===
- Ant-thony, originally codenamed #247, is a carpenter ant used by Hank Pym to spy on Scott Lang. Lang eventually befriends the ant, using it to fly, but it is killed by Darren Cross. According to Deborah Gordon, a biologist at Stanford University, the portrayal of Ant-thony (who is female) in Ant-Man is inaccurate, as queen ants only fly when they are about to reproduce.
- Fenris (based on the Marvel Comics creature of the same name) is a 23-foot-tall wolf owned by Hela, who resurrects it using the Eternal Flame following her release from Hel. She charges at Heimdall, preparing to fight him, but is attacked by the Hulk, who ultimately throws her off Asgard and into space. Visual effects for the creature in Thor: Ragnarok were provided by Framestore, which used camera angles and tight framing to communicate her enormous size.
- Lucky the Pizza Dog (based on the Marvel Comics creature of the same name) is Kate Bishop's pet dog. In December 2024, he was rescued by Bishop in New York City and adopted by her. He then stayed with her and Clint Barton for a few days until they all moved to Barton's house in Iowa. Kate Bishop relocated to a new apartment in New York City, taking Lucky with her. One night, Lucky witnessed Kamala Khan break into the place while Bishop was out. When Bishop returned, she gave Lucky a slice of pizza, which he happily ate as Khan introduced herself to Bishop. He was introduced in Hawkeye, and reappeared in The Marvels.

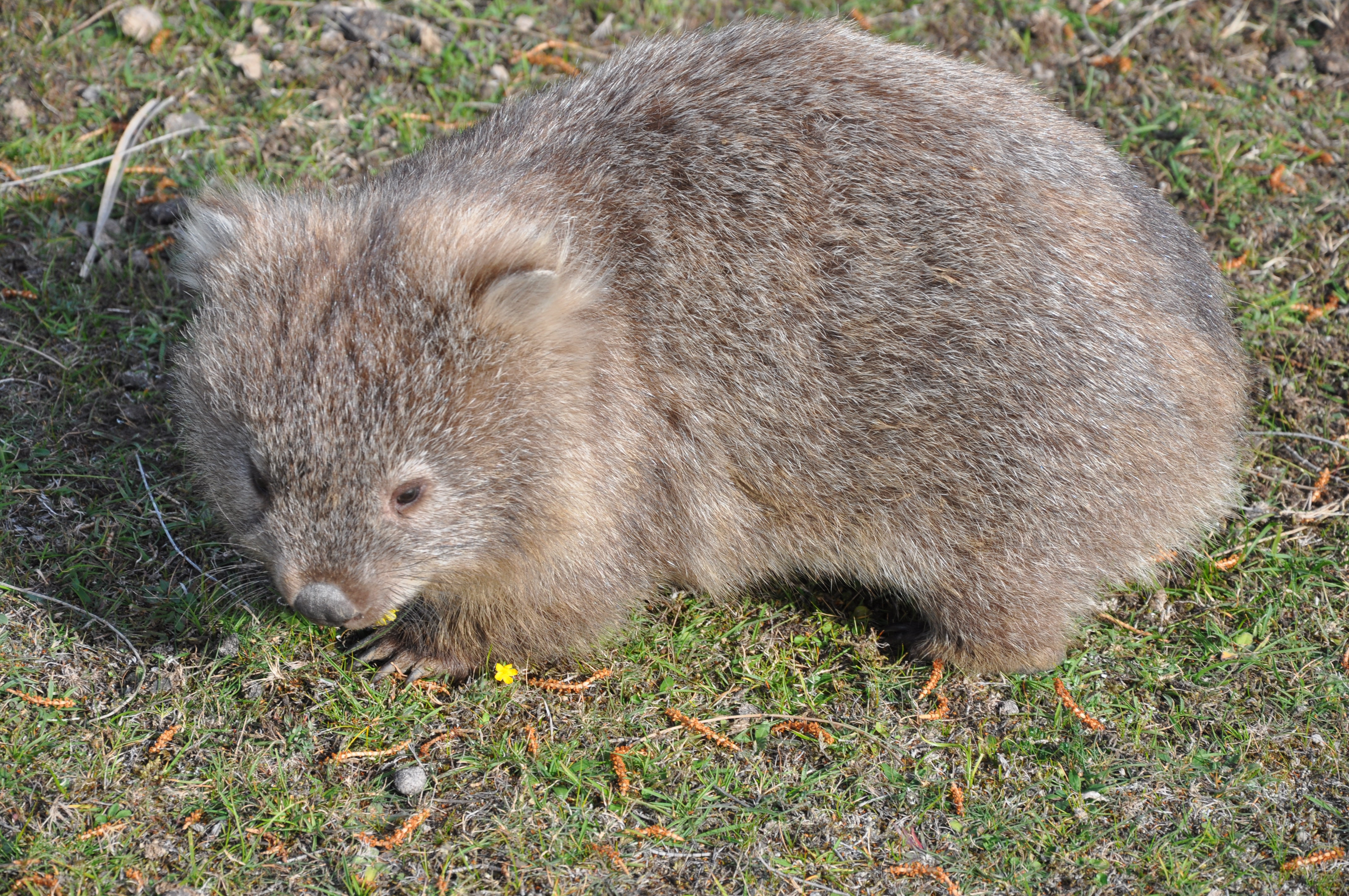
Trixter looked at wombats for inspiration when designing the appearance of Morris.

- Peotor is an orangutan who is part of the Super-Apes.
- Señor Scratchy (based on Ebony and Nicholas Scratch from the Marvel Comics) is Agatha Harkness's rabbit who also acts as her familiar. In an early draft of "The Series Finale", the rabbit would have transformed into a demon in a similar fashion to American Werewolf in London before leading to a The Goonies (1985)-style chase sequence.
- Sparky (based on the Marvel Comics creature of the same name) is a dog who briefly became the pet of twins Tommy and Billy Maximoff before being killed by Ralph Bohner at the behest of Agatha Harkness.

=== Others ===
- The Abilisk is an interdimensional tentacled creature that feeds on Anulax Batteries, the power source of the Sovereign planetary amalgamation. In 2014, the Sovereign people hire the Guardians of the Galaxy to slay the beast, and the creature is killed when Gamora uses her sword to slice it open. In 2026, the Abilisks are revealed to have been created by the High Evolutionary. They are seen when Mantis, Nebula, and Drax are thrown in a chamber with them. Mantis calms them down and adopts them, taking them with her on her journey of self discovery. According to head writer A.C. Bradley, the tentacled monster seen in the first and fourth episodes of What If...? was inspired by the Abilisk.
- Alioth (based on the Marvel Comics creature of the same name) is a cloud-like, matter-consuming entity which resides in the Void and can devour universes. Alioth was created during the first Multiversal War and was harnessed and weaponized by the Kang variant He Who Remains to end the war. Afterwards, Alioth was tasked with guarding the Citadel at the End of Time. Loki visual development artist Alexander Mandradjiev took inspiration from the anime film Princess Mononoke (1997) when designing Alioth.
- Alligator Loki is a reptilian variant of Loki which takes the form of an alligator. It was pruned by the Time Variance Authority (TVA) and banished to the Void. The character was included in Loki "because he's green", according to head writer Michael Waldron, and was doubled by a stuffed alligator during filming to allow actors to interact with it.
- The "Apex" is a kaiju in an alternate universe where Bruce Banner's attempt to rid himself of the Hulk accidentally resulted in the birth of the Apex, which is capable of creating an army of gamma monsters that outnumbers and kills the original Avengers, although a new Avengers team forms and eventually manages to repel the Apex and his gamma monsters for the next ten years. When the gamma monsters resurface, the Avengers attempt to stop them, but to no avail. Banner decides to help the team and uses a gamma bomb to transform into a Godzilla-like "Mega-Hulk". He kills the Apex and becomes the new leader of its army, leading them to a remote island.
- Blurp (voiced by Dee Bradley Baker) is a furry F'saki and the pet of Adam Warlock. He appeared in Guardians of the Galaxy Vol. 3.
- The Dweller-in-Darkness (based on the Marvel Comics creature of the same name) is a soul-consuming demon kept imprisoned for thousands of years by the people of Ta Lo who impersonates Wenwu's deceased wife, Ying Li, manipulating him into using the Ten Rings to release it. The Dweller kills Wenwu upon being freed, but is defeated by Shang-Chi. Visual effects for the creature were provided by Weta Digital in Shang-Chi and the Legend of the Ten Rings, which supplemented its winged, tentacled, and eyeless appearance with a large jaw and tongue. Weta also drew inspiration from a variety of references for each part of its body, including crabs and horns for its armor, a mixture of porous rock, rhinos and elephants for its skin, and obsidian for its teeth.
- Gargantos (based on Shuma-Gorath from the Marvel Comics) is an interdimensional octopus-like being sent by Wanda Maximoff to pursue America Chavez with the aim of stealing her ability to travel the multiverse. Gargantos and Shuma-Gorath are two different creatures in the comics, with the film Doctor Strange in the Multiverse of Madness referring to the creature as Gargantos because the rights to the name Shuma-Gorath are owned by Heroic Signatures. Its eye was modeled after that of Olsen's to foreshadow her role as the film's antagonist.
- Giganto (based on the Marvel Comics creature of the same name) is a ginormous Subterranean creature.
- Goose (based on Chewie from the Marvel Comics) is a Flerken and Mar-Vell's pet during her time on Earth. In the 1990s, she is found by Carol Danvers at the Joint Dark Energy Mission Facility and adopted by Nick Fury. With the ability to deploy long tentacles from inside her mouth as well as store objects in her stomach, she single-handedly takes out a squad of Kree soldiers and blinds Fury's left eye with a scratch. In 2018, Goose survived the Blip, and was taken in under Danvers's care. In 2026, during Danvers's team-up with Monica Rambeau and Kamala Khan, Goose is overseen by the agents of S.A.B.E.R., and begins breeding Flerken eggs around the station, giving birth to numerous offsprings which eventually help evacuate the agents when the S.A.B.E.R. station begins to collapse. She was introduced in Captain Marvel and returned in The Marvels. Hand-drawn pictures of her were seen in Ms. Marvel and she was mentioned on Fury's file in Secret Invasion. An alternate version of Goose also appears in the animated series What If...? episode "What If... Peter Quill Attacked Earth's Mightiest Heroes?".
- The Great Protector is a water dragon which acts as the guardian of Ta Lo. Thousands of years ago, the Great Protector and the people of Ta Lo sealed the Dweller-in-Darkness within the Dark Gate. When the Dweller escapes its seal, the Great Protector defeats it with the help of Shang-Chi, Katy and Xialing. The Great Protector can bestow her power onto people, giving them the ability to manipulate wind; and her scales can be fashioned into weapons and armor that are effective against the Dweller's forces. A life-sized replica of the dragon's head was built for the production of Shang-Chi and the Legend of the Ten Rings, which Weta Digital then digitally added visual effects to. Weta also based the dragon's eyes on those of Fala Chen, who portrays Ying Li in the film, and referenced sea snakes and eels when designing her flight movements.
- Morris (voiced by Dee Baker) is a six-legged, faceless hundun who befriends Trevor Slattery during his imprisonment by the Ten Rings. Morris later escapes with Slattery, Shang-Chi, Katy, and Xialing and leads them to his home, Ta Lo. The creature was inspired by Shang-Chi director Destin Daniel Cretton's 15-year-old dachshund of the same name, and was doubled by a green-screen cushion during filming; the creatives of the film found it difficult to make Morris cute due to it not having eyes or a face to convey emotion, leading them to rely on its fur, feathers, and voice. Visual effects for the creature were provided by Trixter in Shang-Chi, who looked at wombats and puppies for inspiration.
- Shou-Lao (based on the Marvel Comics creature of the same name), also known as Shou-Lao the Undying, is a mythical dragon that dwells in a cave in K'un-Lun and whose molten heart is the source of the Iron Fist power. Every generation, one person from K'un-Lun is chosen to confront Shou-Lao and obtain the power of the Iron Fist.
- Throg (voiced by Chris Hemsworth and based on the Marvel Comics character of the same name) is a variant of Thor who is turned into a frog at one point in his life. Shortly after this occurred, he is detained by the Time Variance Authority (TVA) in a transparent container and sent to the Void.
- Toothgnasher and Toothgrinder (based on the Marvel Comics creatures of the same names) are Thor's magical goats.
- Warsong (based on Aragorn from the Marvel Comics) is Valkyrie's winged steed who can create portals.

== Locations ==
=== Earth ===
==== New York State ====
- The Avengers Compound, also known as the New Avengers Facility, is the primary base of operations of the Avengers and is located on the coast of the Hudson River in Upstate New York. Originally a warehouse owned by Stark Industries and used to store equipment, it is transformed in 2015 into the new headquarters of the Avengers. In 2023, an alternate version of Thanos destroys it and its ruins serve as the battleground for the subsequent Battle of Earth. The interior of the facility was digitally created by Method Studios in Avengers: Age of Ultron. Porsche's headquarters at Aerotropolis Atlanta in Atlanta, Georgia doubled as the compound in Captain America: Civil War and Spider-Man: Homecoming, with Trixter redesigning the facility for its appearance in Homecoming.

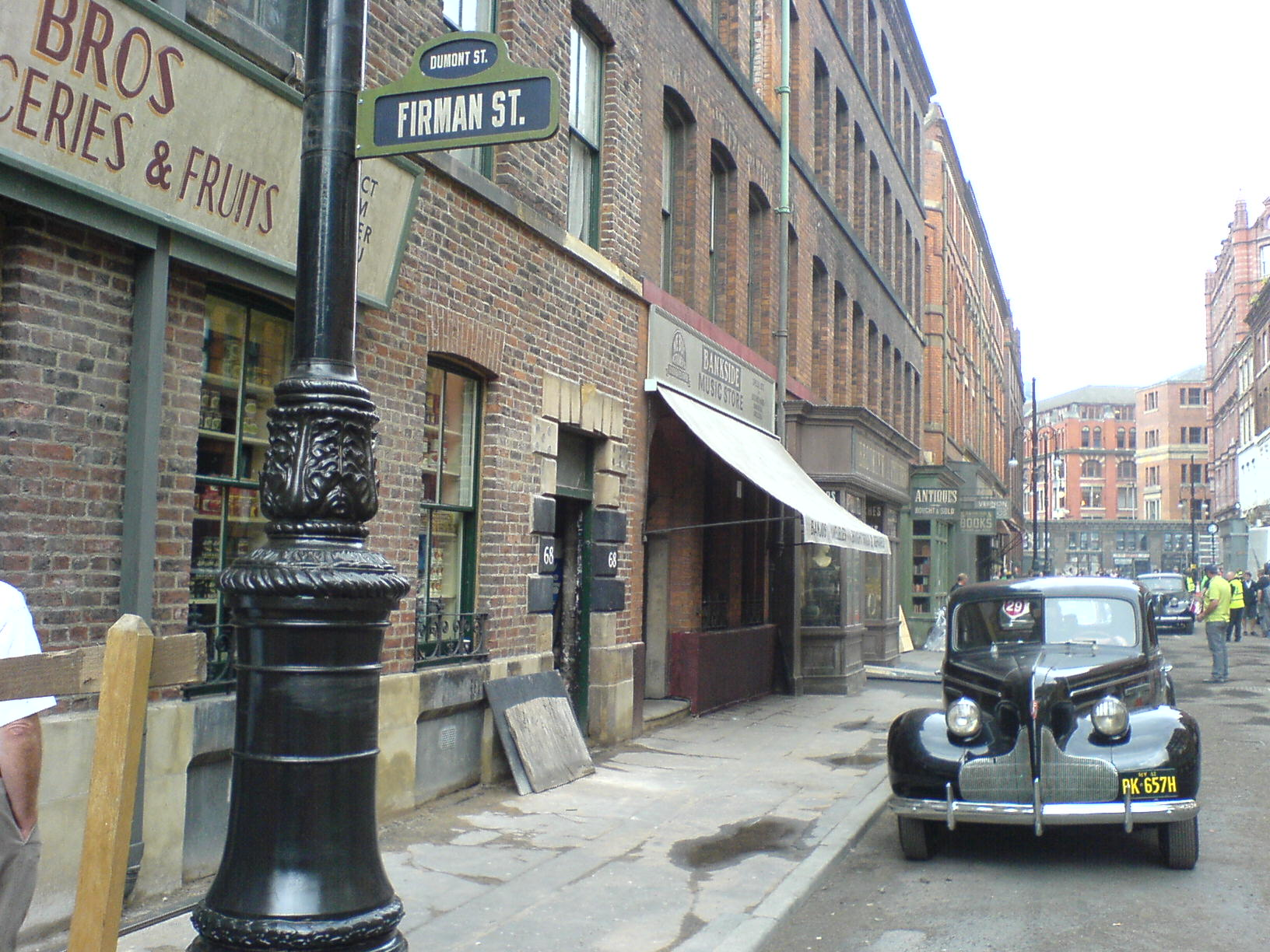
Set of Captain America: The First Avenger in Manchester, England

- The Baxter Building (based on the Marvel Comics location of the same name) is a skyscraper located in Manhattan, New York City of Earth-828 and is the residence of the Fantastic Four.
- Brooklyn Antiques is an antique shop in Brooklyn, New York, that served as a front for the Strategic Scientific Reserve (SSR), where Dr. Abraham Erskine and Howard Stark worked on Project Rebirth. In 1943, Steve Rogers is selected to be injected with Dr. Erskine's Super Soldier Serum, but Hydra mole Heinz Kruger kills Erskine while escaping from the shop. In 2010, the car chase scene in Captain America: The First Avenger was filmed on Dale Street in the Northern Quarter, Manchester. Producers chose Manchester because of its resemblance to 1940s New York City with its high buildings dating from pre-World War II; the site is a shortlisted UNESCO World Heritage Site.
- Clinton Church is a Catholic church in Hell's Kitchen, New York.
- Empire State University (based on the Marvel Comics location of the same name) is a university in New York City.
- Fogwell's Gym (based on the Marvel Comics location of the same name) is a defunct gym located in Hell's Kitchen, New York.
- The Hammer Industries Headquarters is the main headquarters of Hammer Industries, located in Queens, New York. In 2010, Justin Hammer invites Ivan Vanko to the headquarters, hoping to work with him to take down his rival Tony Stark. Natasha Romanoff and Happy Hogan later infiltrate the headquarters and take down several guards. The SpaceX headquarters in Hawthorne, California served as the set for the facility in Iron Man 2.
- Harlem's Paradise is a nightclub located in the neighborhood of the same name in New York City. It was founded by Buggy Stokes and Quincy McIver and served both as a base for the criminal activities of the Stokes family and as a front for laundering their dirty money. After Buggy's death, his wife, Mama Mabel, inherited the club. She later passed it on to her grandson, Cornell "Cottonmouth" Stokes. After Cottonmouth's murder by his cousin Mariah Dillard, she took control of the club and later left it to Luke Cage in her will.
- Josie's Bar is a bar in Hell's Kitchen, New York owned by Josie. The bar was permanently closed after the attack by Benjamin "Dex" Poindexter which killed eleven people.
- The Metro-General Hospital (based on the Marvel Comics location of the same name) is a hospital located in New York City.
- The Midtown School of Science and Technology (based on the Marvel Comics location of the same name) is a fictional STEM-focused high school in Queens, New York City. Its students include Peter Parker, Ned Leeds, Michelle Jones-Watson, Flash Thompson, Betty Brant, Jason Ionello, Liz, Cindy Moon, Seymour O'Reilly, Tiny McKeever, Charles Murphy, Abe Brown, Sally Avril, Brad Davis, Zach Cooper, and Josh Scarino. Faculty includes Roger Harrington, Coach Wilson, Mr. Cobbwell, Monica Warren, Barry Hapgood, and Julius Dell. The school's principal is Principal Morita, who is shown to be a descendant of Howling Commandos member Jim Morita. Henry W. Grady High School in Atlanta, Van Nuys High School and Reseda High School in Los Angeles, as well as Franklin K. Lane High School in Brooklyn doubled as the school in Spider-Man: Homecoming. To change the setting from the set to Queens, Trixter created a CGI model of the school and added 360-degree matte paintings.

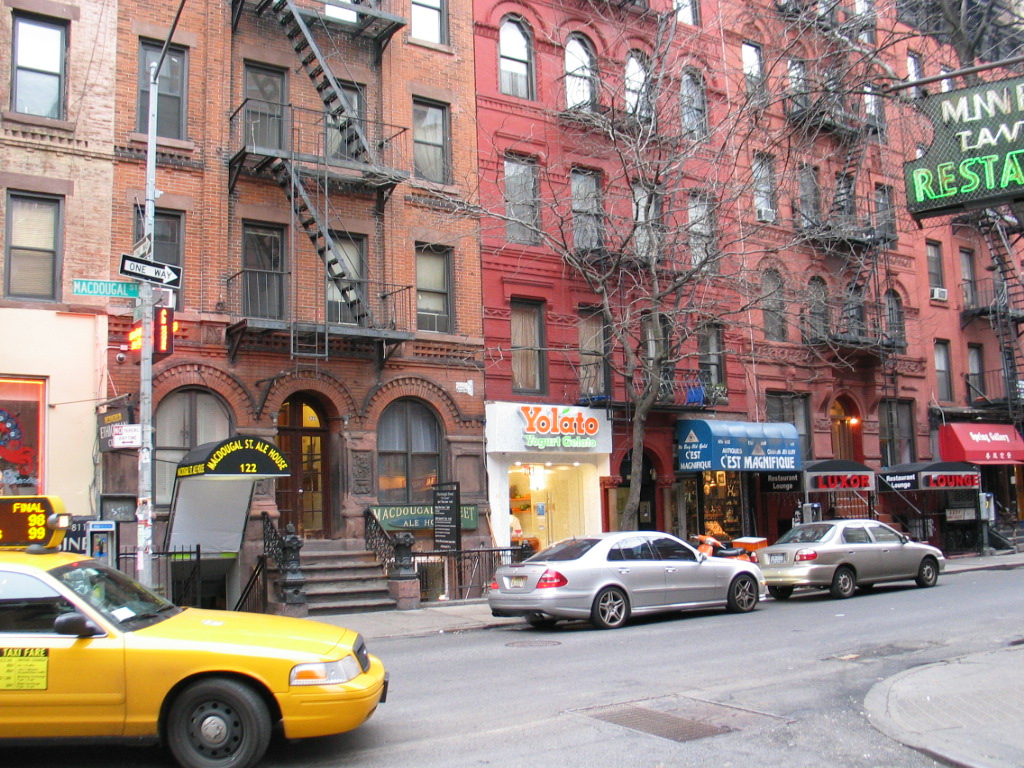
Greenwich Village, location of the New York Sanctum.

- The New York Sanctum (based on the Marvel Comics location of the same name) in Greenwich Village, New York City, is one of the three Sanctum Sanctorums on Earth. Located on 177A Bleecker Street, it is used by the Masters of the Mystic Arts to store various relics and serves as one of their bases. It is guarded by Daniel Drumm until his death, whereupon he is replaced by Stephen Strange. In 2017, Strange detains Loki and invites Thor to the Sanctum, then sends them both to their father Odin. In 2018, following his escape from the Statesman, Bruce Banner crash-lands in the New York Sanctum and meets Strange and Wong. Strange and Wong then discuss the threat with Banner and Tony Stark. In 2024, the Sanctum is also visited by Peter Parker who requests Strange's help, in which he performs a memory-removing spell. After the spell goes wrong, Strange tasks Parker and his friends to retrieve multiversal displaced people and bring them to the Sanctum. Also, in 2024, Strange and América Chávez visit Earth-838 New York Sanctum, which has a statue of a deceased Strange and is protected by the Sorcerer Supreme from that universe, Karl Mordo. A set for the building was constructed at Longcross Studios in Surrey, England, for Doctor Strange, which was also used in Thor: Ragnarok.
- Rockford T. Bales High School is a fictional high school in New York City that is attended by Peter Parker in an alternate universe. In addition to Parker, other students include Nico Minoru, Lonnie Lincoln, and Pearl Pangan.
- The Stark Eco-Compound is the residence of Tony Stark, Pepper Potts, and their daughter, Morgan Stark. Located in the countryside of Upstate New York, it is built by Tony Stark shortly after his marriage with Potts, and he lives there until his death in 2023. His funeral is held in front of the residence.

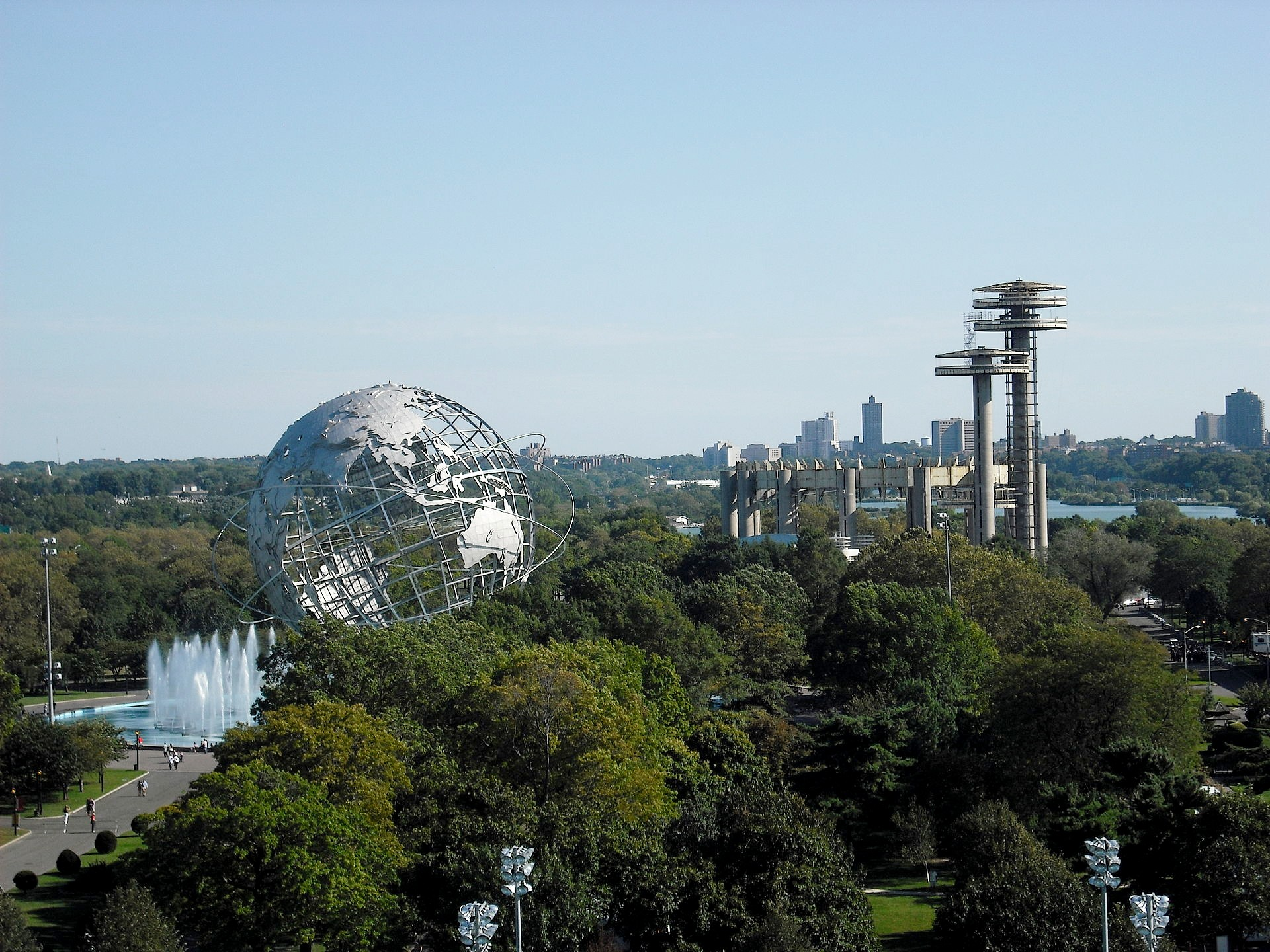
Flushing Meadows-Corona Park, location of the Stark Expo.

- The Stark Expo, also known as the World Exposition of Tomorrow, is an exposition at the Flushing Meadows–Corona Park in Queens, New York City. Started by Tony Stark's father, Howard, it gathers great minds and showcases new technology. Past attendees include Phineas Horton (showcasing his Synthetic Man) and Peter Parker.
- Subterranea (based on the Marvel Comics location of the same name) is an underground realm below New York City of Earth-828, whose inhabitants refer to themselves as Moloids. Their ruler is Harvey Elder / Mole Man.
- Watchtower (based on the Marvel Comics location of the same name), formerly known as Stark Tower and Avengers Tower, is a skyscraper in Manhattan, New York City. The building, initially owned by Stark Industries, serves as the headquarters of the Avengers until the Battle of Sokovia. Tony Stark later sells the building to Valentena Allegra de Fontaine who rebrands the building as the Watchtower. Alternate versions of the building are seen in the Void and a universe where Ultron defeats the Avengers. Avengers: Age of Ultron production designer Charles Wood built an enormous set for the film, one of the largest ever built for an MCU film, with multiple connected environments and levels.
- Yancy Street (based on the Marvel Comics location of the same name) is a public thoroughfare located in New York City on Earth-828.

==== Wakanda ====
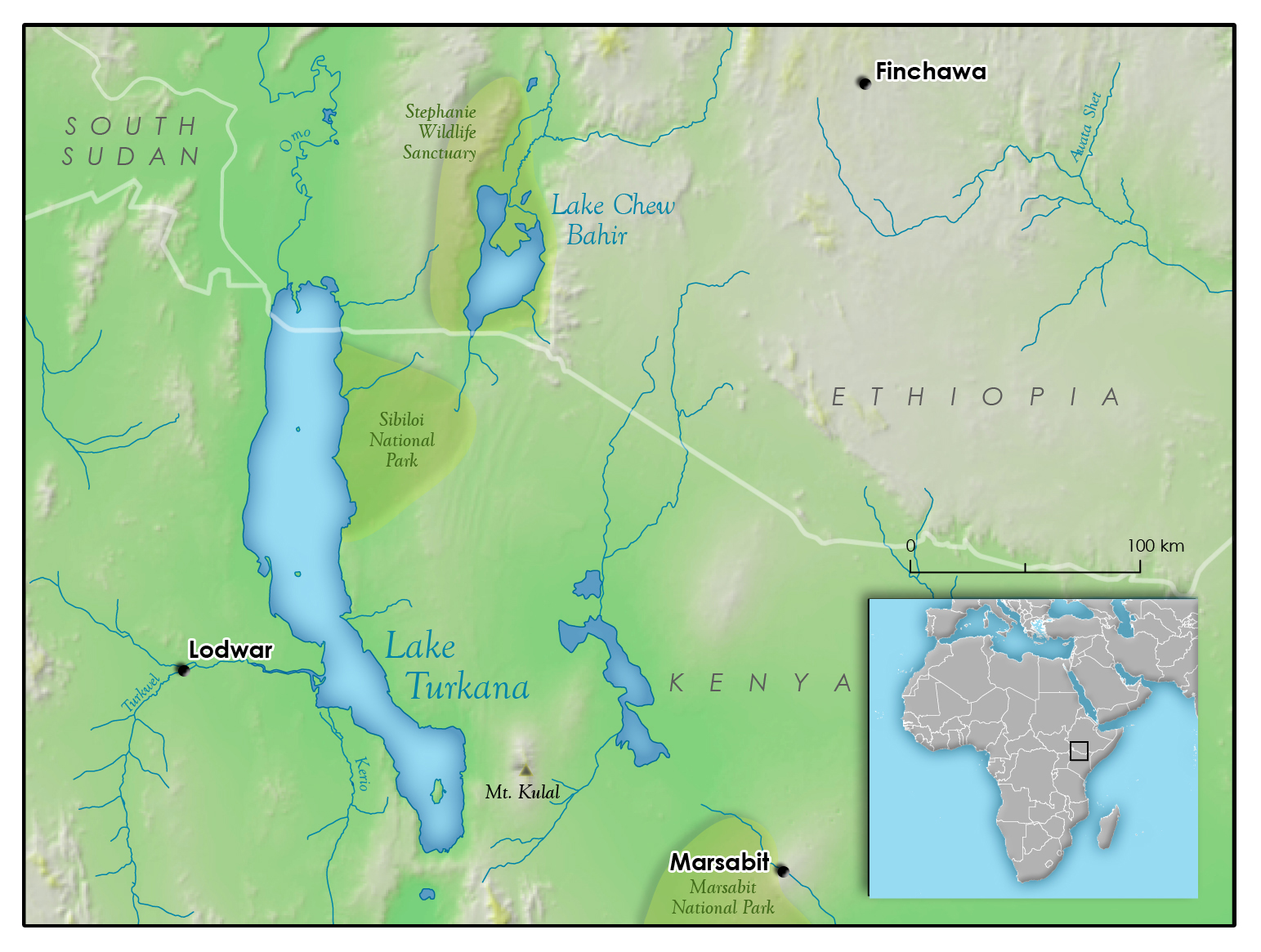
In the MCU, Wakanda is located just north of Lake Turkana, at a point bordering Kenya, Ethiopia, Uganda and South Sudan.

Wakanda (based on the Marvel Comics location of the same name) appears in media set in the Marvel Cinematic Universe (MCU). Inhabitants from this version of the country speak in the Xhosa language, as T'Challa's actor Chadwick Boseman developed using a "regional accent based on where Wakanda would be. He did great research on the very cultural aspects of the character. Even though it's a fictional culture, [he figured out] ways to tether it into real African culture." Additionally, it is located at the northern end of Lake Turkana, at a fictional point bordering Ethiopia, South Sudan, Uganda, and Kenya. In real life, this area is actually a disputed border region known as the Ilemi Triangle, claimed by each of these countries. This follows the location of the country in the comics according to Marvel Atlas #2.

The film Black Panther further established that, in keeping with this map location, it is a landlocked country in the central mountains far from the coasts. Impassable mountains and jungles around its borders have helped Wakanda isolate itself from outsiders. Internally, Wakanda consists of lush river valleys, mountain ranges rich in natural resources, and a fabulous capital city that integrates space-age technology with traditional designs.

Wakanda consists of five tribes, four of which are united under the rule of the first Black Panther 10,000 years ago. As in the comics, the four tribes (The River tribe, the Mining tribe, the Merchant tribe, and the Border tribe) worship Bast, the panther god, amongst others, and also have a strong spiritual tradition of ancestor worship.

- The River Tribe wear green clothes made from crocodile skin, with some males wearing a lip plate.
- The Mining Tribe are in charge of the Vibranium that is mined, stored, and utilized.
- The Merchant Tribe are responsible for trades and crafts of art, clothing and pieces of art. They also wear veils during a trade to maintain anonymity.
- The Border Tribe reside on the mountainous borders of Wakanda posing as farmers in order to deceive foreigners of Wakanda's wealth as well as their talent for breeding white rhinoceros for many purposes.
- The fifth tribe are the Jabari (or Mountain Tribe) who follow the White Gorilla cult of the god Hanuman and are staunch traditionalists who isolate themselves in the mountains. While considered part of Wakanda, the Black Panther's hold over the Jabari is tenuous. During the film, their leader M'Baku rejects T'Challa as a worthy heir to the throne during his coronation and challenges him to ceremonial combat to claim it for himself. T'Challa wins the duel but lets M'Baku leave in peace.

The lords of each tribe sit on the king's council, and after the Mountain tribe assists T'Challa in his overthrow of the usurper, Erik "Killmonger" Stevens, M'Baku is also granted a seat on the council in recognition of his loyalty. The four main tribes speak a version of the Xhosa language while the Jabari speak an Igbo dialect. The opening animated sequence to Black Panther explains Wakanda was aware that the outside world was becoming increasingly chaotic throughout various historical events that affected Africa, such as the Atlantic slave trade, the colonization of Africa by European powers, World War I, and World War II. The Black Panthers of the past, however, were devoted to defending their own country and did not interfere, instead choosing to hide Wakanda from the world—fearing that if they became involved and revealed themselves, it would eventually lead to outsiders trying to invade Wakanda. Instead, Wakanda passes itself off as a small, poor Third World nation of humble herdsmen, using an advanced holographic projection shroud around its borders to hide the advanced technological civilization within. A core tension of the film's narrative is that the new Black Panther, T'Challa, is torn between his loyalty to hide and defend Wakanda as its king, and his own conscience to help the faltering world beyond its borders. Later in the film, Killmonger arrives to try to seize the throne—sharing T'Challa's desire to end Wakanda's isolationism, but by conquering the outside world using Wakanda's advanced technologies and weapons instead. Ultimately, T'Challa defeats Killmonger and decides to reveal Wakanda's true nature to the world during an address at the United Nations. The film's popularity led to a trend among athletes and celebrities around the world to throw up "Wakanda Forever" salutes after their victories. Director Ryan Coogler stated that his depiction of Wakanda was inspired by the southern African kingdom of Lesotho. Basotho blankets also became more known as a result of the film and its basis on Lesotho.

Below are Wakanda's featured appearances:

- Wakanda is briefly shown on a holographic map in Iron Man 2 and is mentioned in Avengers: Age of Ultron as the source nation of vibranium.
- In the mid-credit scene of Captain America: Civil War (2016), Steve Rogers oversees Bucky Barnes, having been granted refuge there, going into cryogenic sleep until Hydra's brainwashing can be removed. This is Wakanda's first appearance.
- Black Panther (2018) expands on Wakanda's background and culture, establishing that, as in the comics, the Black Panther's superhuman abilities come from consuming the "heart-shaped herb", local vegetation that mutated over millions of years due to exposure to Vibranium.
- In Avengers: Infinity War (2018), members of the Avengers; Steve Rogers, Sam Wilson, Natasha Romanoff, James Rhodes, Wanda Maximoff, Vision, and Bruce Banner travel in a Quinjet to Wakanda, landing in the capital city so Shuri's advanced science can remove the Mind Stone from Vision safely. Wakanda is shortly attacked by the Outriders led by Proxima Midnight and Cull Obsidian, members of the Black Order. The Avengers and Barnes join forces with the Wakandan army to fight them on the open grassland outside of the city. They are aided by the arrival of Thor, Rocket Raccoon, and Groot who arrive via Bifrost and assist in defeating the army. In the forest below the Wakandan medical center, the Avengers witness Thanos arrive through a Wormhole and defeat them one by one, ultimately claiming the Mind Stone and completing the Infinity Gauntlet. He then snaps his fingers, eliminating half the population of the universe, including Shuri, T'Challa and many other Wakandans.
- In Avengers: Endgame (2019), the restored Wakandans rally behind T'Challa in Wakanda before passing through portals created via sorcery to upstate New York. Wakanda's Golden City holds a celebration for the Blip's victims' restoration.
- In a flashback in the fourth episode of The Falcon and the Winter Soldier (2021), Barnes is seen in a Wakandan cave verifying that his brainwashing has been undone.
- In What If...? (2021), Wakanda is depicted in different timelines; at the second episode, T'Challa reunites with his family in Wakanda after having been mistakenly abducted by Yondu Udonta and the Ravagers 20 years earlier. During the final moments of the fifth episode, Wakanda is shown, besieged by zombies and led by a zombified Thanos wielding a nearly-complete Infinity Gauntlet. In the sixth episode, Killmonger instigates conflict between Wakanda and the United States and becomes the new Black Panther. In the ninth episode, Shuri leads Pepper Potts and the Dora Milaje to arrest Killmonger, but he disappears due to him having been recruited by the Watcher to help fight an alternate Ultron.
- In Black Panther: Wakanda Forever (2022), Wakanda's capital city is attacked by Namor and his army, ending with Ramonda's death.
- In Eyes of Wakanda (2025), Wakanda is depicted in different timelines. On February 1, 2021, an animated Disney+ series set in Wakanda was announced to be in development, with Coogler being involved through his company, Proximity Media. In 2023, Disney announced the name of the project, Eyes of Wakanda, which will tell the stories of T'Challa and Shuri's ancestors.

==== S.H.I.E.L.D. facilities ====
- Camp Lehigh is a United States Army training facility in the fictional town of Wheaton, New Jersey. It serves as one of the bases of the Strategic Scientific Reserve during World War II. After the war, it is taken over by S.H.I.E.L.D. Howard Stark and Hank Pym performing research there while Arnim Zola secretly uploads his consciousness into a series of many computers. In 2014, the camp is destroyed by a S.H.I.E.L.D. missile sent by Hydra. Years later, it is rebuilt and in 2025, hosts the first AvengerCon, attended by Kamala Khan.
- The Fridge is a detainment and storage facility at a classified location.
- The Guest House is a former top-secret storage facility at a classified location, previously affiliated with the Strategic Scientific Reserve and S.H.I.E.L.D.; it became a secret research facility for Project T.A.H.I.T.I.
- Joint Dark Energy Mission Facility is a top-secret research facility used by S.H.I.E.L.D. and NASA to study the Tesseract as part of Project Pegasus. In 1995, Carol Danvers and Nick Fury infiltrate the base and discover Danvers's involvement with testing an experimental light-speed engine powered by the Tesseract designed by Dr. Wendy Lawson who was a Kree scientist. The Facility was destroyed in 2012 by the energy emitted by the Tesseract after Loki's arrival at the facility.
- The Lighthouse is a massive bunker built in case of an apocalyptic-level event, located under a lighthouse in Lake Ontario, New York. Constructed and equipped by S.H.I.E.L.D. under the command of Rick Stoner, it was abandoned from 1972 until late 2017, when it became S.H.I.E.L.D.'s primary base of operations.
- The North Institute was a covert S.H.I.E.L.D. research facility in Ohio. Unbeknownst to S.H.I.E.L.D., the North Institute was secretly run by Hydra with the goal of perfecting the Winter Soldier Program. The facility was burned down by Alexei Shostakov in 1995.
- The Playground, codenamed Ragtag, was a former Strategic Scientific Reserve facility at a classified location that was renovated to become a top-secret S.H.I.E.L.D. facility. After the HYDRA Uprising and upon Phil Coulson becoming Director of S.H.I.E.L.D., it became the headquarters for the new S.H.I.E.L.D. It was destroyed by Melinda May's LMD.
- Providence is one of Nick Fury's secret S.H.I.E.L.D. bases, in Ontario, Canada, and operated by Eric Koenig.
- The Triskelion was a compound located on Little Island, Washington, D.C., south of the Theodore Roosevelt Island at the foot of the Theodore Roosevelt Bridge. S.H.I.E.L.D.'s headquarters and main base of operations, the base is taken over by Hydra during their uprising within S.H.I.E.L.D. to use three Helicarriers to kill people they deem to be threats. It is destroyed by a disabled Helicarrier. While most shots of Washington, D.C., in Captain America: The Winter Soldier were digitally created due to numerous flight restrictions in the city, aerial footage of the city was used for live-action plate photography for shots that involved the Triskelion.

==== Others ====
- Clint Barton's farmhouse, also known as the "safe house", is the private residence of Clint Barton and his family. In 2015, Barton brings the Avengers to his house to take refuge. They are joined by Nick Fury who gives them a motivational talk. Sometime after, the family moves to another house. In 2018, Barton's family fall victim to the Blip outside the house. In 2023, Barton returns to his house and is reunited with his restored family. In 2024, Barton brings Kate Bishop and her dog, Lucky, to the house to celebrate Christmas with his family.
- Culver University is a fictional university in Willowdale, West Virginia. Notable former students include Jane Foster, Roger Harrington, and Darcy Lewis, while notable former faculty include Bruce Banner, Betty Ross, and Erik Selvig. Action sequences set at the university in The Incredible Hulk were filmed at the University of Toronto and Morningside Park, Toronto.
- The Department of Damage Control Supermax Prison, abbreviated to DODC Supermax Prison, is a maximum-security federal prison in California administered by the Department of Damage Control (DODC) to incarcerate individuals with superpowers.
- The Golden Dagger Club (based on the Golden Daggers sect from the Marvel Comics) is an underground fight club in Macau, China. Founded by Xialing when she was 16 years old after running away from the Ten Rings organization, the club makes its income from livestreaming fights onto the dark web; the participants have included Black Widows, Extremis soldiers, Emil Blonsky, and Wong. Wenwu tricks Shang-Chi into visiting the club, then raids the club with his men to capture his children and Katy.
- Gulmira is a fictional city in Afghanistan and the hometown of Ho Yinsen. In 2008, following terrorist attacks by the Ten Rings, Tony Stark finishes his new Mark III armor and flies to the town, where he kills several terrorists and destroys a nearby stockpile of Jericho Missiles.

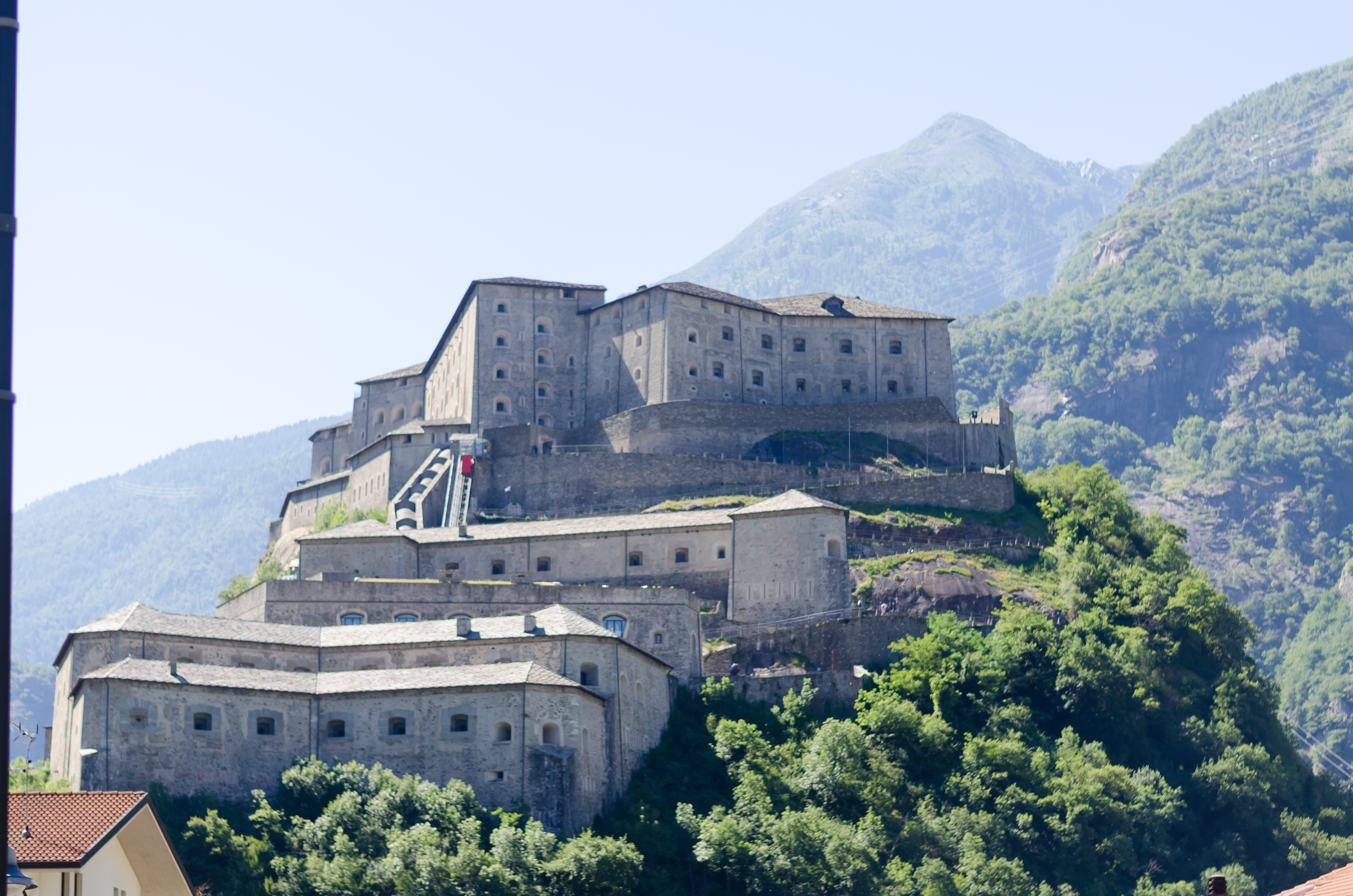
The opening sequence of Avengers: Age of Ultron was filmed at the Fort Bard fortified complex in Bard, Italy.

- The Hydra Research Base in Sokovia is a research facility operated by Hydra, where Wanda and Pietro Maximoff were exposed to the Mind Stone during Hydra experiments. This amplified Wanda's magical powers and granted Pietro superhuman abilities. Scenes set in the facility in Avengers: Age of Ultron were filmed at Fort Bard in Bard, Italy, as well as Dover Castle in Dover, Kent, England.
- Kamar-Taj (based on the Marvel Comics location of the same name) is the headquarters of the Masters of the Mystic Arts in Kathmandu, Nepal. Stephen Strange visits searching to cure for his hands after a car accident severely injures them. Its libraries contain many books on the mystic arts, including the Book of Cagliostro, Maxim's Primer, Book of the Invisible Sun, Codex imperium, Astronomia nova, and The Key of Solomon. The location of Kamar-Taj was changed from Tibet to Nepal to prevent censorship by the Chinese government. For Doctor Strange, the interior of the building was constructed at Longcross Studios in Surrey, England, and integrated into a real building in Kathmandu.
- Latveria (based on the Marvel Comics location of the same name) is a country on Earth-828 and the only nation in that reality without a representative present at an address given by Sue Storm to the Future Foundation organization.
- Madripoor (based on the Marvel Comics location of the same name) is a fictional island city-state in the Indonesian archipelago that is controlled by the Power Broker. The island is divided into two parts: the wealthy Hightown with the richer, upper-class criminals and the deprived Lowtown where gangs and criminal groups are located.
  - The Princess Bar (based on the Marvel Comics location of the same name) is a tavern in Madripoor run by a woman named Selby.
- The Mindspace is a virtual space inside Vision's mind. It is inhabited by various AIs, including Ultron, J.A.R.V.I.S., F.R.I.D.A.Y., D.U.M.-E., U., and E.D.I.T.H.
- Mount Wundagore (based on the Marvel Comics location of the same name), is a mountain that holds the power of the Darkhold and a shrine dedicated to the Scarlet Witch. After the Darkhold is destroyed. Wanda Maximoff forces Wong to lead her to Wundagore, allowing her to dream-walk into the body of her Earth-838 self and be with that universe's versions of Billy and Tommy Maximoff. After seeing Billy and Tommy recoiling in horror at her corruption, she uses her powers to bring down Wundagore, sacrificing and killing herself in the process. Dr Doom later visits and lifts the crumbled site to awaken the Scarlet Witch, wanting to take her power.

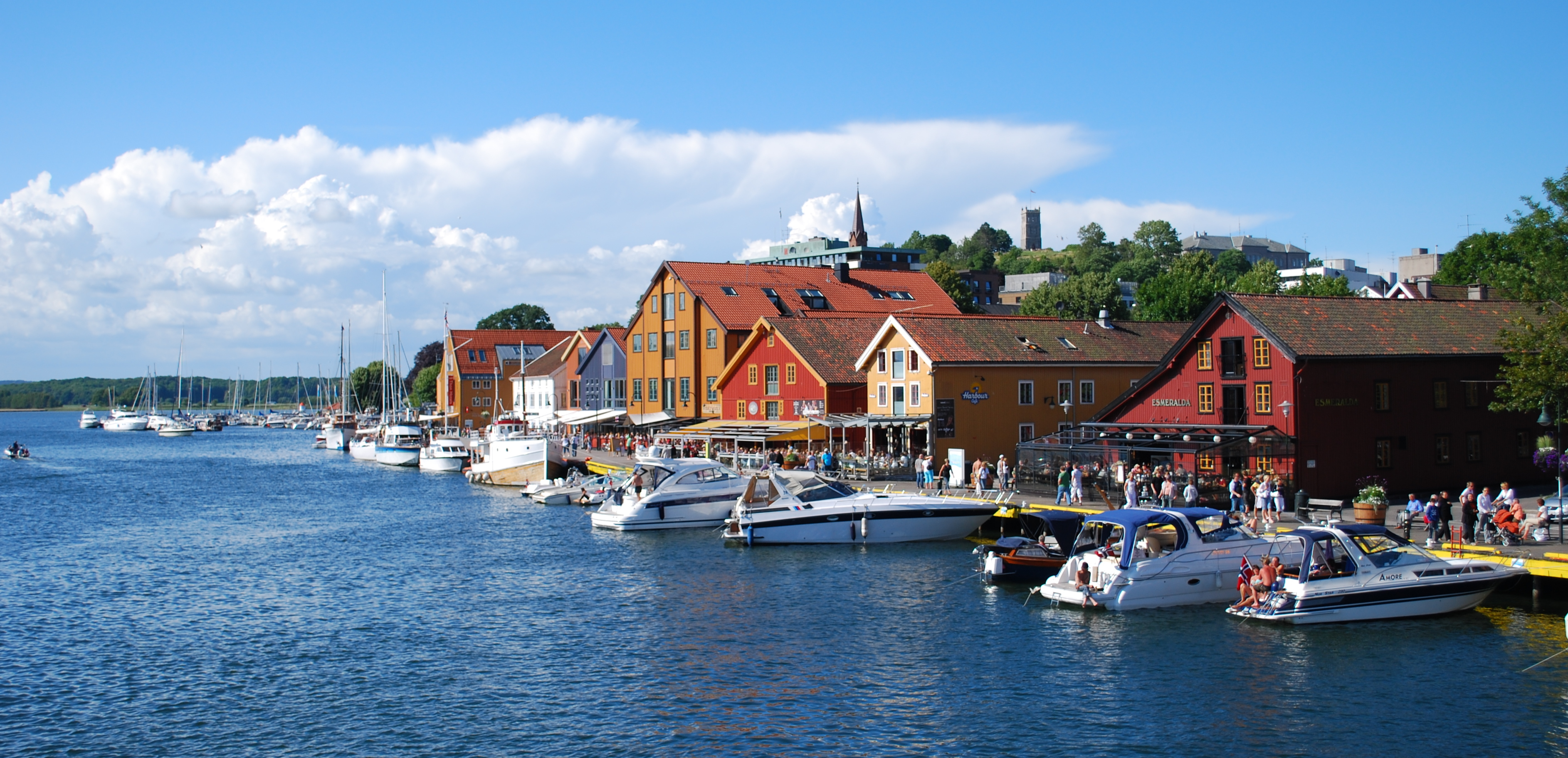
Tønsberg Wharf in Tønsberg, Norway, where New Asgard is located.

- New Asgard, formerly Tønsberg, is a village in Norway that housed the Tesseract for centuries until Johann Schmidt stole it during World War II. The town is also where Odin resides in his final days after being banished by Loki. After the Blip, the town is renamed New Asgard and serves as a refuge for the surviving Asgardians and other inhabitants of the Nine Realms. It is recognized by the UN as a city-state, is led by Valkyrie, and has tourist attractions memorializing Asgard's history such as an ice cream parlour named the "Infinity Conez."
- New Skrullos, also known as Skrull Town, is an abandoned and undocumented nuclear site in Russia that the Skrulls have repurposed as both a base of operations and a refugee camp for their species due to their immunity to Earth's radiation.
- Puente Antiguo is a fictional town in New Mexico where in 2010, astrophysicist Jane Foster, her intern Darcy Lewis, and her mentor Erik Selvig were studying atmospheric disturbances when they encounter Thor arriving via the Bifröst. Upon learning of Mjölnir's location nearby, Thor storms the S.H.I.E.L.D. facility surrounding the hammer before being arrested by Phil Coulson. Later, following the arrival of Sif and the Warriors Three, the town becomes the battleground for a fight between Thor and the Destroyer, who had been sent by his brother Loki. In 2013, Foster moves back to the town with Thor and they pursue their relationship. However, in 2015, they break up and Thor leaves the town. In 2023, after the Blip, Foster learns she has stage 4 cancer and receives treatments at the hospital. In 2024, Foster continues the treatments but they do not help her. Cerro Pelon Ranch in Galisteo, New Mexico doubled as the city in Thor, which was extensively modified for the film.
- The Pym Technology Headquarters is the headquarters of Pym Technologies. Located on Treasure Island, San Francisco, it is destroyed by Scott Lang during his fight with Darren Cross. The Georgia Archives building in Downtown Atlanta doubled as the building in Ant-Man.
- The Raft (based on the Marvel Comics location of the same name) is a maximum security prison, where Thaddeus Ross serves as warden. Designed to hold super-powered people, the prison is located underwater in the Atlantic Ocean. Sam Wilson, Wanda Maximoff, Clint Barton, and Scott Lang are remanded to the prison after helping Steve Rogers and Bucky Barnes evade capture, thus violating the Sokovia Accords. They are later broken out by Steve Rogers and Natasha Romanoff, though Barton and Lang return to their families under house arrest. In 2018, Trish Walker and Willis Stryker are imprisoned in the Raft after going on killing sprees. In 2024, days after Helmut Zemo escapes from a prison in Berlin, the Dora Milaje of Wakanda bring him to the Raft via the Royal Talon Fighter. By 2027, Ross and Samuel Sterns were also imprisoned in the raft.

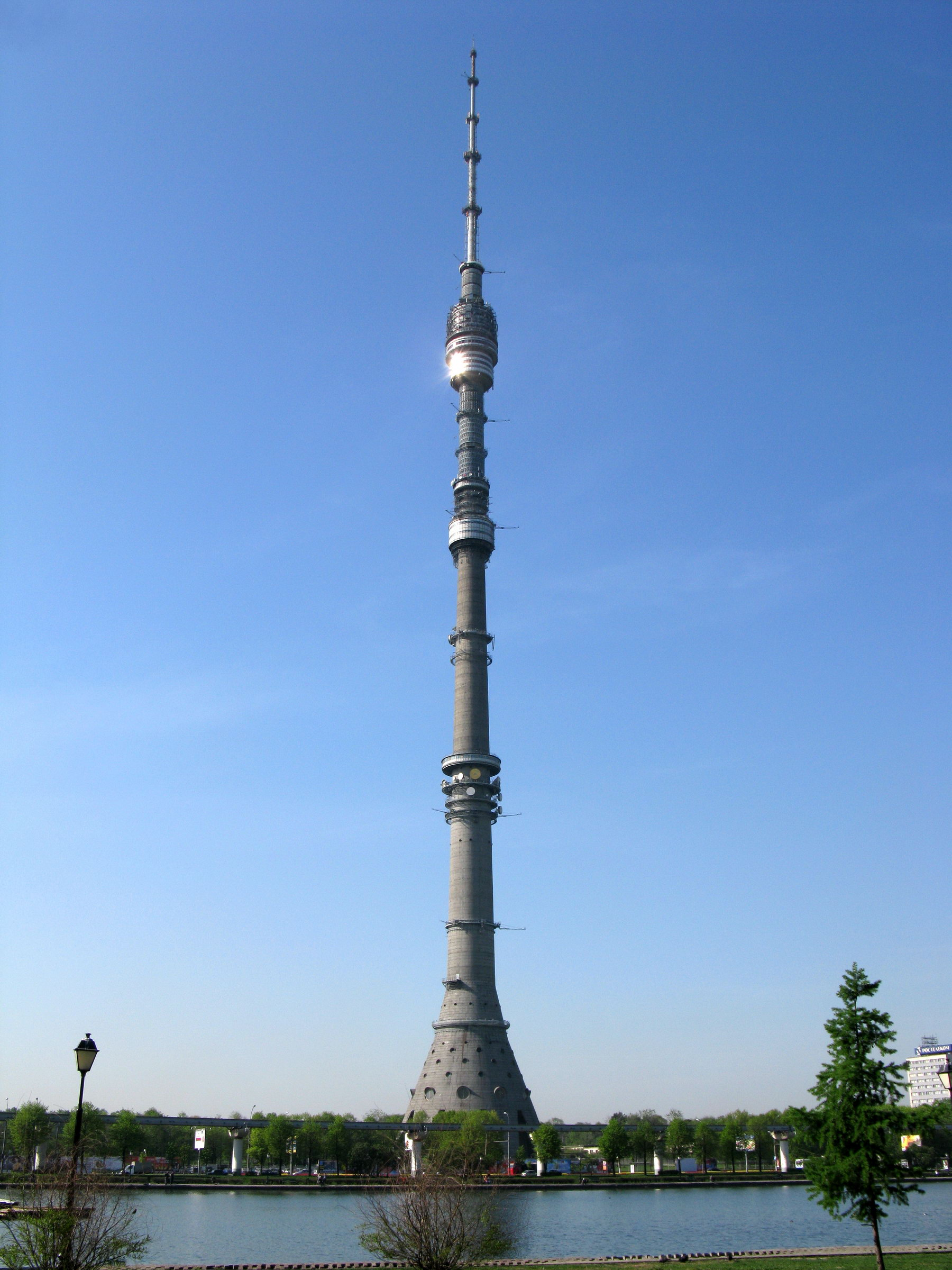
Ostankino Tower inspired the design of the Red Room.

- The Red Room is a large aerial facility that acted as the primary base of the program of the same name. Led by General Dreykov, it is where Black Widows are brainwashed and trained to become elite assassins. It is destroyed in 2016 after Melina Vostokoff takes down one of its engines. Visual effects for the facility in Black Widow were provided by Industrial Light & Magic (ILM) and Digital Domain, who also worked on the final battle and skydiving sequences. Digital Domain referenced Stalinist architecture, such as the Ostankino Tower in Moscow, when designing the Red Room, while the filmmakers hired military consultants to ensure the practicality of the facility.
- Rose Hill is a fictional town in Tennessee where Tony Stark stays after his armor runs out of power. It is the hometown of Harley Keener, a child who helps Stark to repair his suit and later attends his funeral. The fictional town is named after the city in North Carolina where portions of Iron Man 3 were filmed.
- Saint Mabyn's Psychiatric Sanitarium (based on the Marvel Comics location of the same name) is a psychiatric institution located in London, England. In 2028, Tommy Maximoff was being transported to Saint Mabyn's when his superhuman speed manifested, allowing him and Lisa Molinari to escape. Tommy was later recaptured by Paladin and taken to the hospital as part of a trap for Vision, who subsequently infiltrated the facility in an attempt to rescue him.
- Sokovia (Соковиja, Sokovija) is a fictional landlocked country in Eastern Europe that is the home of Wanda and Pietro Maximoff, as well as Helmut Zemo. The United States used Stark Industries-manufactured bombs to attack the country to stabilize it and secure peace, killing Wanda and Pietro Maximoff's parents. Mary Walker and her U.S. Army squad were ambushed by the Sokovian Armed Forces, with almost all of them murdered. During the Hydra uprising, Hydra sets up a research facility in Sokovia, where they conduct experiments on the Maximoff twins using Loki's scepter. The country later serves as the battleground for a conflict between the Avengers and Ultron, which results in the destruction of the country's capital city, Novi Grad, as well as the ratification of the Sokovia Accords. The country is annexed by the surrounding countries soon after. Scenes set in the city were filmed in the Aosta Valley region in Italy in Avengers: Age of Ultron, in which local storefronts were replaced with Cyrillic script. Hendon Police College, a training facility for London's Metropolitan Police Service was also used to portray a city in Sokovia.
- The Stark Mansion is the private residence of Tony Stark, located at 10880 Malibu Point, Malibu, California. It is destroyed by Aldrich Killian (posing as the Mandarin) in a missile attack. The mansion's exterior shots in Iron Man were digitally added to footage of Point Dume in Malibu, while its interior shots were filmed on soundstages in Playa Vista, Los Angeles.
- Talokan (based on Atlantis and Tlālōcān from Aztec mythology) is an underwater kingdom in the Atlantic Ocean ruled by Namor that is populated by the Talokanil located in the Gulf of Mexico.
- The Ten Rings Headquarters is the main base of operations of the Ten Rings criminal organization, located on an unknown mountaintop in China. The compound was founded a thousand years ago by Wenwu during his early years as a warlord, and also served as his personal retreat for him and his family, with Shang-Chi and Xialing having spent their childhoods there. The compound includes a throne room, training grounds for its warriors, a library housed with relics of Ta Lo, a dungeon, and an underground parking lot. After Xialing assumes leadership of the Ten Rings, she redecorates the compound with graffiti reminiscent of her Golden Dagger Club.
- The Valley of the Broken Gods is the site of the never-ending battle between the Eternal Ikaris and a zombified Carol Danvers in an alternate universe. It is located in Pennsylvania.
- The Vault (based on the Marvel Comics location of the same name) is a top-secret, heavily fortified underground facility where Valentina Allegra de Fontaine stores incriminating evidence of her illegal activities.
- Westview is a fictional town in New Jersey. The Vision and Wanda Maximoff buy a plot of land in the town, but Vision is killed soon after by Thanos. When Maximoff arrives at the plot, she inadvertently creates an anomaly around the town, placing almost all of its inhabitants under mind control, transforming objects on a molecular level, and broadcasting a sitcom titled WandaVision. Dubbed "the Hex" by Darcy Lewis, the anomaly gives Monica Rambeau superhuman abilities after she passes through the barrier three times, and creates simulacrums of Billy Maximoff, Tommy Maximoff, and Vision. When Agatha Harkness attacks Maximoff, she destroys the boundary, the residents escape, and Wanda's children and Vision disintegrate. The town's name alludes to Feige's hometown of Westfield, New Jersey.
- The Witches' Road (based on the Marvel Comics location of the same name) is a fictional mystical pathway described in a song conceived by Agatha Harkness and her son Nicholas Scratch in the 1750s. The legend of the Road promises to grant witches their deepest desires for overcoming a series of arcane trials. Over the centuries, Harkness perpetuates and exploits the myth of the Witches' Road, deceiving witches into forming covens with her in order to absorb their powers and kill them. Eventually, the Road is unknowingly willed into existence by Billy Maximoff as a pocket dimension underneath Westview, New Jersey. Harkness's latest coven walks the Road, their expertise challenged through individual trials. Upon exiting the Witches' Road, Maximoff seals the entrance with his magic, leaving an epitaph tribute to fallen members of Harkness's coven.

=== Space ===
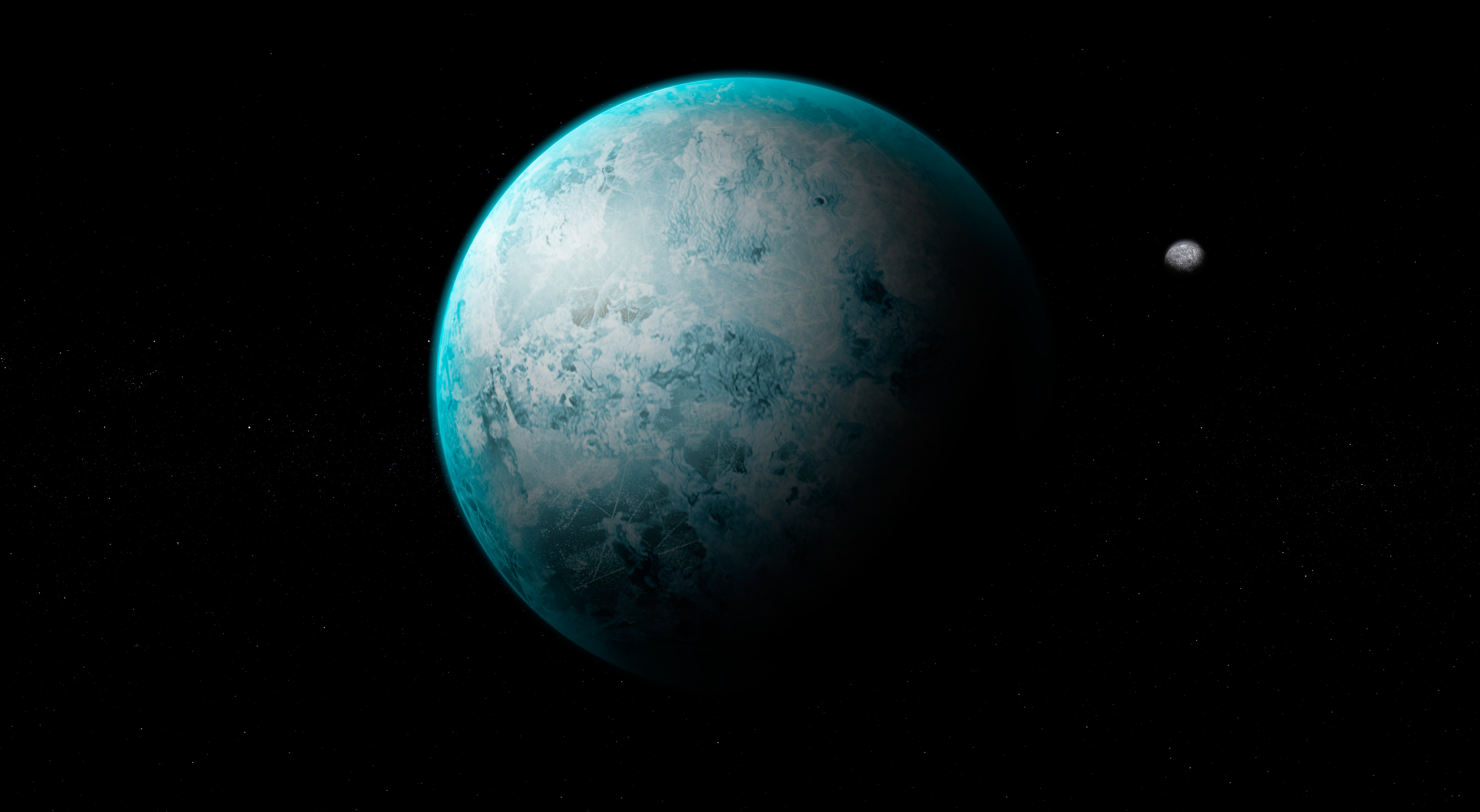
Hypothetical illustration of an ice planet

- Contraxia is an ice planet which is commonly visited by the Ravagers as a place to relax, especially at the Iron Lotus brothel. Sometime in 2014, Stakar Ogord comes across Yondu Udonta on Contraxia, while Howard the Duck also appears in the bar. A set for the Iron Lotus was built at Pinewood Atlanta Studios in Atlanta, Georgia, which Guardians of the Galaxy Vol. 2 production designer Scott Chambliss sought to make it appear to have been put together from "repurposed junk", creating a "neon jungle" covered in ice and snow.
- Counter-Earth (based on the Marvel Comics location of the same name) also known as Halfworld, was an artificial planet located in the Keystone Quadrant. It was designed by the High Evolutionary as a replication of Earth and was inhabited by the Humanimals.
- Ego's planet (based on the Marvel Comics location of the same name) is a living mass of matter that the Celestial Ego formed around himself thousands of years ago, causing him to resemble a large red planet with a face. The planet is destroyed by a bomb planted by the Guardians of the Galaxy in Ego's brain, and is also destroyed by Ultron in an alternate reality. Visual effects of the planet in Guardians of the Galaxy Vol. 2 were provided by Animal Logic, Method Studios, and Weta Digital. Weta and Animal Logic's work were heavily based on fractal art, including Apollonian gaskets and Mandelbulbs, and was described by director James Gunn as "the biggest visual effect of all time".
- The Garden, also known as Planet 0259-S and Titan II, is a greenfield planet where Thanos resides following his "retirement". After fulfilling his lifelong goal of "making balance" by wiping out half of the Universe, he teleports to the planet and smiles at the sunrise as he reflects on his success. Three weeks later, the Avengers travel there and Thor decapitates him upon learning that he had destroyed the Infinity Stones.
- Knowhere (based on the Marvel Comics location of the same name) is the severed head of an ancient deceased Celestial which acts as the homeworld of the Exitar mining colony, founded by Taneleer Tivan, the Collector. In 2014, Knowhere is visited by the Guardians of the Galaxy, who try to sell the Power Stone to the Collector, but after an explosion caused by the Stone, the Collector's museum is destroyed. Shortly after, Ronan the Accuser and his enforcers arrive and the Guardians leave. In 2018, Knowhere is attacked by Thanos who acquires the Reality Stone. In 2025, Knowhere is purchased by the Guardians from Tivan, who begin to renovate it into their new headquarters. They host a Christmas celebration for their leader, Peter Quill, by bringing Kevin Bacon there. In 2026, Knowhere has become a mobile city. It comes under attack from the High Evolutionary's Hellspawn and becomes the safe haven for the captured animals and engineered children. Nebula decides to take leadership over Knowhere. In an alternate reality, Star-Lord T'Challa leads the Ravagers on a mission against the Collector on Knowhere. Visual effects of the planet were created by Framestore.
- The Kyln (based on the Marvel Comics location of the same name) is a high-security prison run by the Nova Corps. The Guardians of the Galaxy are brought together in the prison and execute an escape plan, with Ronan ordering Nebula to massacre all of its inhabitants upon learning of Gamora's escape. Visual effects of the prison were created by Framestore.
- Lamentis-1 is a purple-hued moon that is destroyed by a nearby planet in the year 2077. Loki and Sylvie arrive on the moon through a Time Door, but are unable to escape due to their TemPad having run out of power. After failing to board an Ark to escape, they are rescued and recaptured by the TVA. Loki production designer Kasra Farahani opted to build an enormous practical set piece of the town Sharoo instead of using Industrial Light & Magic (ILM)'s StageCraft technology, implementing a "blocky ziggurat language" and using black-light paint to distinguish it from other alien worlds in the MCU. Visual effects for the moon were provided by Digital Domain, who also considered making the planet "a lush world covered in greenery", one "dominated by massive oceans", and one containing a molten core which later implodes.
- Morag is an abandoned ocean planet located in the Andromeda Galaxy, with its oceans only receding to expose its landmasses every 300 years. In 2014, Peter Quill arrives on the planet to obtain the Orb, a mission that is replicated by Star-Lord T'Challa in an alternate reality. In 2023, James Rhodes and Nebula time-travel to 2014 Morag and knock Peter Quill out before acquiring the Orb. Visual effects of the planet in Guardians of the Galaxy were created by Moving Picture Company (MPC).
- Omnipotence City (based on the Marvel Comics location of the same name) is a citadel where pantheons from across the cosmos gather for lavish banquets and debauched parties, and entry is permitted only by invitation.
- Sakaar (based on the Marvel Comics location of the same name) is a planet ruled by the Grandmaster, who holds his Contest of Champions on the planet. In 2015, it was visited by Bruce Banner and in 2017, by Thor and Loki. In 2025, it is visited again by Banner, who retrieves his son, Skaar. In an alternate universe, the planet is destroyed by Ultron. The art of Thor co-creator Jack Kirby served as one of the primary inspirations for Sakaar's depiction in Thor: Ragnarok, and was described by executive producer Brad Winderbaum as "the toilet of the Universe" surrounded by an endless number of wormholes. A set for the planet was constructed at the Village Roadshow Studios in Oxenford, Queensland, including the Grandmaster's palace and the surrounding junkyard. Visual effects for the planet's junkyard landscape and wormholes were created by Double Negative and Digital Domain. A Sakaarian national anthem is featured in an unused version of the second post-credits scene of Ragnarok, which was improvised by Jeff Goldblum and Waititi.
- The Sanctuary is an asteroid field inhabited by the Chitauri which acts as the domain of Thanos, where he gives orders to The Other and Ronan. Visual effects of the location were created by Digital Domain in The Avengers.
- Skrullos (based on the Marvel Comics location of the same name) was the homeworld of the Skrulls. It was destroyed by the Kree during the Kree–Skrull War.
- The Sovereign is an amalgamation of planets artificially fused together which serves as the homeworld to the genetically-engineered species of the same name. Powered by Anulax Batteries, it is ruled by Ayesha. The amalgamation is destroyed by Ultron in an alternate reality. Visual effects for Ayesha's lair in Guardians of the Galaxy Vol. 2 were provided by Framestore, while Luma Pictures worked on the Sovereign world and its people. A set for the planet was also built at Pinewood Atlanta Studios in Atlanta, Georgia, which employed a "1950s pulp fiction variation on 1930s art deco design aesthetic".
- Tarnax was a planet where the Skrulls established a refugee colony. The planet was destroyed by the Kree warrior Dar-Benn.
- Titan (based on the Marvel Comics location of the same name) is an exoplanet and the homeworld of Thanos before its inhabitants were wiped out from overpopulation. In 2018, Tony Stark, Peter Parker, and Stephen Strange ally with the Guardians of the Galaxy to confront Thanos, who acquires the Time Stone following a battle and teleports to Wakanda. In 2023, Parker, Strange, and the Guardians depart Titan through a portal. In an alternate 2018, in the 838 universe, the Illuminati kill Thanos on Titan, and then kill that universe's version of Stephen Strange after he is corrupted by the Darkhold.
- Vormir (based on the Marvel Comics location of the same name) is a barren planet and the location of the Soul Stone, which is guarded by the Red Skull. In 2018, Thanos coerces Gamora into revealing the Stone's location before teleporting there, where she is sacrificed for Thanos to obtain the Stone. Similarly, Natasha Romanoff sacrifices herself in 2023 for Clint Barton to acquire the Stone.
- Xandar (based on the Marvel Comics location of the same name) is the capital of the Nova Empire and home of the Nova Corps. In 2014, Ronan attacks Xandar in retaliation for the Kree–Nova War, killing most of the Nova Corps before being defeated by the Guardians of the Galaxy and the Ravagers. It is later decimated by Thanos in 2018, an event replicated by Ultron in an alternate reality. Scenes set on the planet in Guardians of the Galaxy were filmed at Millennium Bridge, London, while visual effects were done by Moving Picture Company (MPC).
- Zenn-La (based on the Marvel Comics location of the same name) is a planet that was once threatened with consumption by the gigantic cosmic being Galactus, although he ultimately decided to spare the planet after one of its inhabitants, Shalla-Bal, volunteered to become his herald.

=== Nine Realms ===
- Asgard (based on the Marvel Comics location of the same name) is a small, flat planetary body and the home of the Asgardians. It is destroyed by Surtur. Double Negative embedded a computer-generated rendering of Asgard onto footage of the coast of Norway filmed with an Arri Alexa camera in a helicopter in Thor: The Dark World. For its appearance in Thor: Ragnarok, production designer Dan Hennah sought to give the realm "more of a humanity" than in previous films by adding smaller building perspectives, making it appear more practical and utilitarian. A set for the realm was constructed at the Village Roadshow Studios in Oxenford, Gold Coast, Queensland, Australia, based on the aesthetics of previous Thor films, while visual effects were provided by Framestore based on assets Double Negative had from The Dark World.
  - The Rainbow Bridge is a long magical bridge that runs from the center of Asgard to the edge, connecting the Royal Palace of Valaskjalf to Himinbjörg, the generator of the Bifröst Bridge. In 2011, the Rainbow Bridge is destroyed by Thor, but is later repaired by Heimdall using the power of the Tesseract.
  - Odin's vault, also known as Odin's treasure room, is a room in the Royal Palace of Valaskjálf that contained many powerful and magical artifacts, including a replica of the Infinity Gauntlet, the Eternal Flame, the Casket of Ancient Winters, and the Tesseract.
- Hel (based on the Marvel Comics location of the same name) is a region in Niflheim that serves as the home of the dead. After Hela is banished there by her father, Odin, she attempts to escape and slaughters almost all of the Valkyrie, only to be defeated by Odin once again. The flashback sequence in Thor: Ragnarok featuring the Valkyrie was produced by Rising Sun Pictures, who achieved its surreal ethereal appearance through a combination of motion capture, computer graphics, a 900 fps frame rate, and a special 360-degree lighting rig containing 200 strobe lights.
- Jotunheim (based on the Norse mythological location of the same name) is an icy planet that is home of the Frost Giants and the birthplace of Loki Laufeyson. Visual effects for the planet were created by Digital Domain in Thor, who were sent paintings from classic studies by J. M. W. Turner by director Kenneth Branagh.
- Muspelheim (based on the Norse mythological location of the same name) is a fiery realm that is home to the Fire Demons, most notably Surtur. Two years following the Battle of Sokovia, Thor journeys there to confront Surtur on Ragnarök before killing him. Thor: Ragnarok production designer Dan Hennah described the realm as a Dyson sphere which draws power out of a dying star to energize its inhabitants.
- Nidavellir (based on the Norse mythological location of the same name) is an Alderson disk surrounding a dying star, inhabited by gigantic Dwarves who served as blacksmiths for the Asgardians, forging weapons such as Mjölnir, Stormbreaker, and the Infinity Gauntlet out of uru. Sometime between 2014 and 2015, Thanos visits the forge, forcing the Dwarves to make the Infinity Gauntlet before slaughtering them and smelting Eitri's hands. Thor, Groot, and Rocket visit the forge several years later, aiding Eitri in creating Stormbreaker.

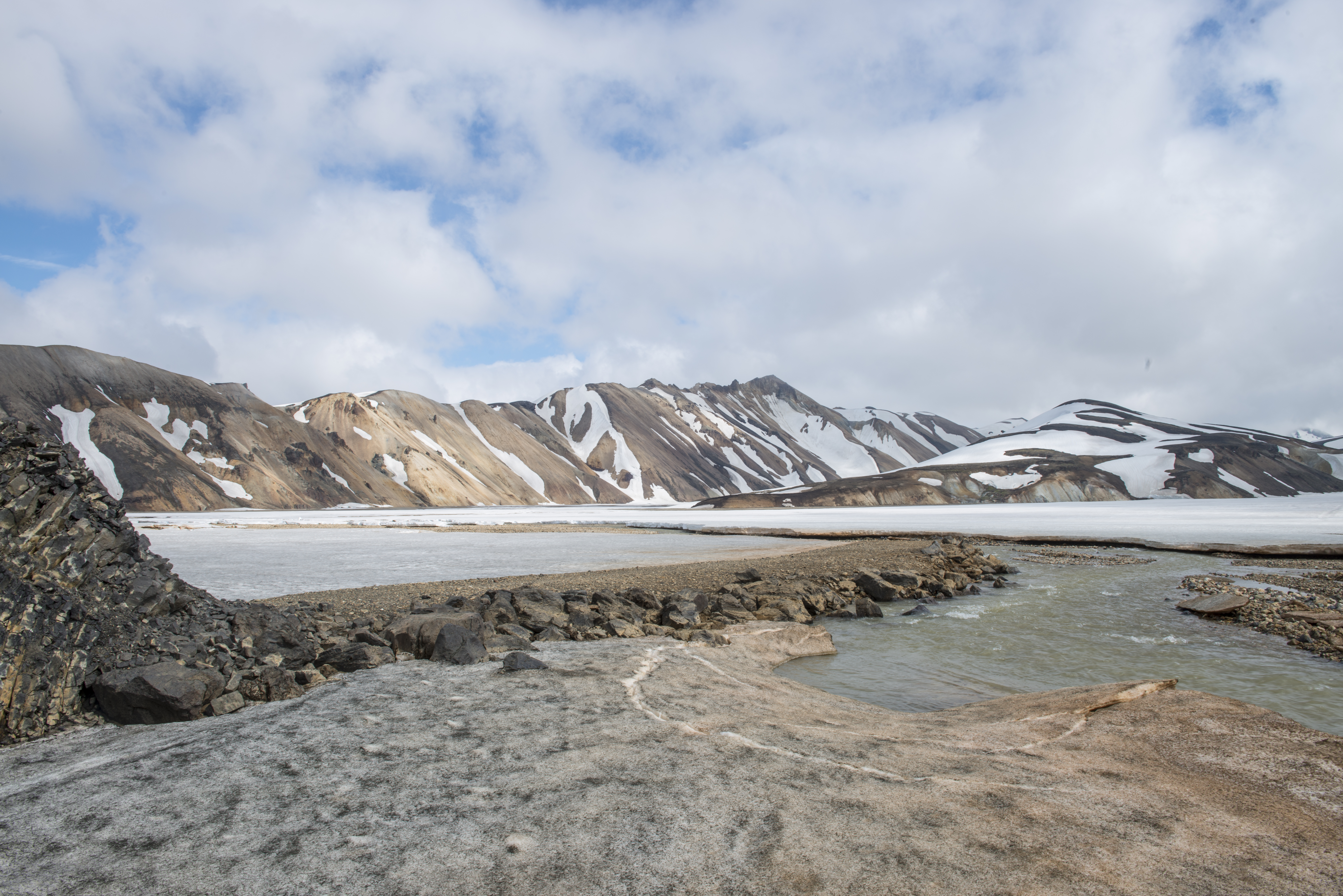
Iceland doubled as Svartalfheim in Thor: The Dark World.

- Svartalfheim (based on the Norse mythological location of the same name), also known as the Dark World, is a planet that is wreathed in perpetual darkness and ruled by the Dark Elves, led by Malekith the Accursed. Visual effects of Thor: The Dark World's prologue scene were done by Blur Studio, and mainly consisted of CGI with live-action shots interwoven throughout. Subsequent scenes in the film were shot in Iceland, with Double Negative adding ruins, mountains, Dark Elf ships, and skies.
- Midgard (based on the Norse mythological location of the same name), is another name for Earth.

=== Dimensions ===
- The Astral Dimension (based on the Marvel Comics location of the same name), also known as the Astral plane, is a dimension in which the soul resides outside the body. It is mainly featured in the form of astral projection in Doctor Strange when the Ancient One pushes Stephen Strange's astral form out of his body. The fight sequence in Doctor Strange between Stephen Strange and a Zealot's astral forms was the first scene in the film written by director Scott Derrickson, who was inspired by the comic Doctor Strange: The Oath. Visual effects for scenes set in the dimension were provided by Framestore, who described the process as "one of the hardest effects [they've] had to deal with". This imagery is reused in Avengers: Endgame, WandaVision, Spider-Man: No Way Home, and Doctor Strange in the Multiverse of Madness. The Astral Dimension is also connected to the MCU's afterlife, which is interpreted as being a subjective reality depending on the belief system of the individual.
- The Ancestral Plane is a location where deceased Wakandans reside, specifically those who have worn the mantle of Black Panther. The living are able to communicate with these past rulers upon ingestion of the heart-shaped herb.
- The Duat is the name for the Egyptian perspective of the afterlife, where the goddess Taweret ferries Marc Spector and Steven Grant across an ocean of sand to reach the Field of Reeds. If a person's heart does not balance against the Feather of Truth, they are consumed by other lost souls in the sands. Spector and Grant make it back to the real world through the Gates of Osiris.
- Valhalla is revealed to be the Asgardian afterlife.

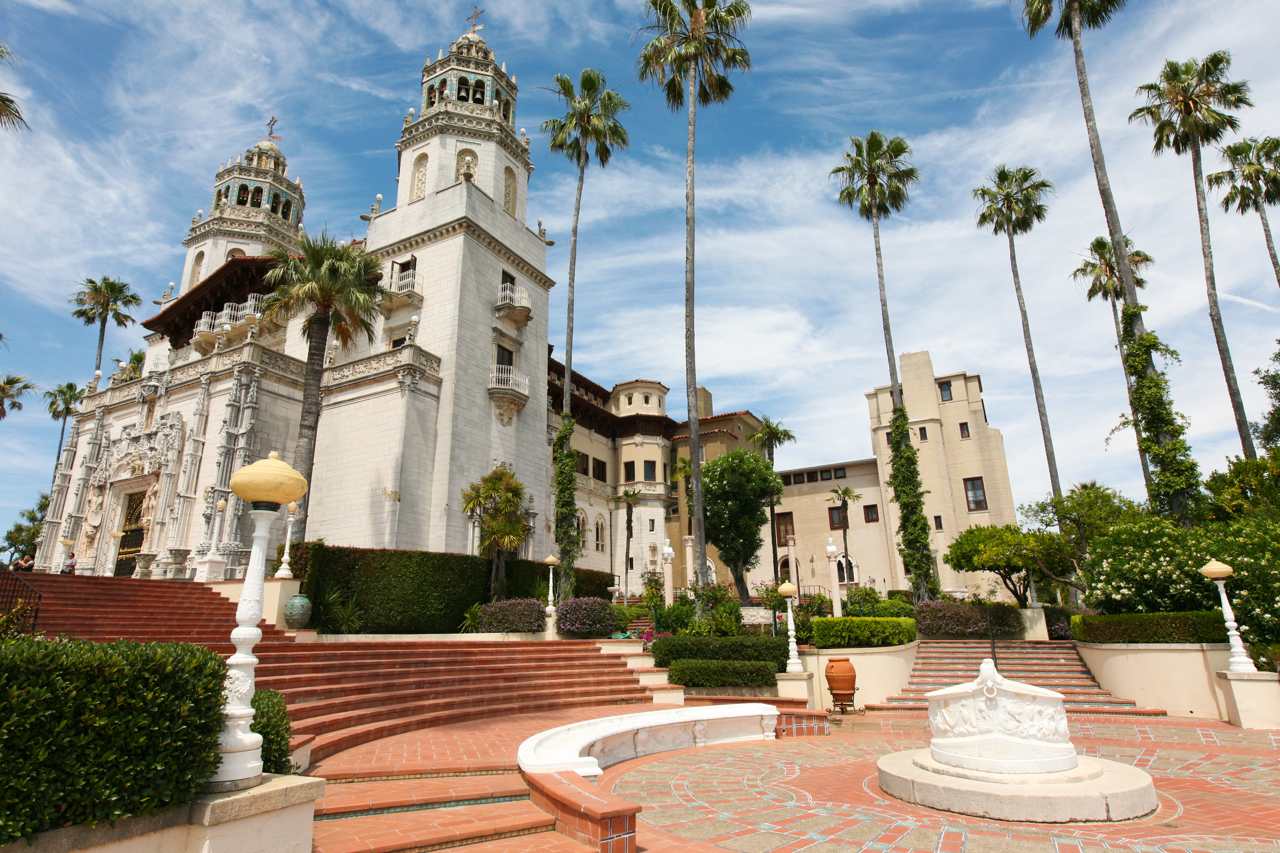
Hearst Castle inspired the design of the Citadel at the End of Time.

- The Citadel at the End of Time is a castle atop an asteroid at the end of time where He Who Remains resides and watches over the Sacred Timeline, which orbits the place. Carved in situ from the asteroid and made a "black stone with gold vein embellishments", the Citadel is mostly abandoned except for He Who Remains' office, with Loki production designer Kasra Farahani intending to reflect the loneliness of He Who Remains. Outside his office, there are also numerous 13-foot-tall statues of "sentinels of time" in the "Hall of Heroes", each holding half of an hourglass. A nebula outside the window and a fireplace were used as light sources in He's office. The design and architecture of the Citadel was inspired by Hearst Castle and compared to Sunset Boulevard. The Production Designer for Loki was inspired by the Japanese repair technique Kintsugi as it uses gold to repair cracks in broken pottery.
- The Dark Dimension (based on the Marvel Comics location of the same name) is a timeless dimension inhabited by Dormammu. It is an amalgamation of itself and all other dimensions Dormammu had conquered and absorbed into it. Stephen Strange visits it to bargain with Dormammu after Kaecilius contacts it to absorb the Earth. Years later, Clea, who reigns from the dimension, recruits Strange to help save it from an incursion. Visual effects of the dimension in Doctor Strange were provided by Method Studios and Luma Pictures. Doctor Strange visual effects supervisor Stephane Ceretti described the Dark Dimension as a "dynamic environment", with the Luma team using art by Steve Ditko as a reference.
- K'un-Lun (based on the Marvel Comics location of the same name) is a mystical city located in a dimension that connects to Earth periodically.
- The Mirror Dimension is a dimension which causes the surroundings to be reflected in different directions, similar to the function of a mirror, without affecting the real world. Due to its nature, it is used by the sorcerers for training and controlling threats. The Ancient One uses it during the Battle of New York, while Stephen Strange uses it against Kaecilius, Thanos, Peter Parker, and Wanda Maximoff. According to Doctor Strange director Scott Derrickson, the action sequences set in the dimension is an attempt to take Inception "to the Nth degree and take it way more surreal and way farther". Industrial Light & Magic (ILM) was primarily responsible for visual effects of the Manhattan folding sequence, which consisted of 200 shots and was mainly CGI, although some real-life shots of New York were used. Meanwhile, Luma Pictures worked on the first mirror sequence at the beginning of the film.
- The Observational Plane is a space located in the fifth dimension, from which Uatu / Watcher observes the infinite number of alternative realities in the multiverse.
- The Quantum Realm (based on the Microverse from the Marvel Comics; for the theory in physics, see quantum mechanics) is a subatomic universe that exists outside of space and time. It can only be entered through subatomic particles or forms of mystical magic. In 1987, Janet van Dyne went subatomic and was stranded in the realm for thirty years. Additionally, the Council of Kangs exiled Kang the Conqueror to the realm. He befriended van Dyne, who helped him fix his time chair, only to learn from a neurolink who he really was. She then betrayed him, causing him to remain trapped. During this time, Kang conquered the realm and took control over it, building an empire, and displacing its residents. In 2015, Scott Lang goes subatomic to defeat Darren Cross and enters the realm, but manages to escape, while Cross remains stuck in the realm. In 2018, van Dyne is rescued by Hank Pym and they leave the realm. That same year, Lang becomes stuck in the realm's time vortex for five years, although he only experienced five hours in the realm. In 2019, agents of S.H.I.E.L.D. return to the main timeline through the realm from an alternate 1983 to defeat the Chronicoms. In 2023, Lang and the Avengers use the realm to travel to alternate timelines to reverse the Blip. An alternate Thanos acquires their technology and uses the realm to travel himself, his ship, and his army to their universe. In 2026, van Dyne, Pym, Lang, Hope van Dyne, and Cassie Lang are transported into the realm after Cassie's quantum satellite is heard by Cross. They find themselves hunted by Kang, who wants revenge on van Dyne. After they find a portal to leave the realm, Kang tries to follow, but are ultimately defeated and pulled into his multiversal power core. The Quantum Realm is so named because the name "Microverse" is associated with the Micronauts, whose rights are held by Hasbro Entertainment. Quantum physicist and California Institute of Technology staff researcher Spiros Michalakis suggested the new name. Visual effects for the dimension in Ant-Man, Doctor Strange, and Ant-Man and the Wasp were provided by Method Studios.
- The Sanctum Infinitum is a Sanctum created by Doctor Strange Supreme to serve as his dwelling place, as well as to imprison universe-killers that he intended to feed to his Forge to resurrect his dead universe before being stopped by Captain Carter and Kahhori.
- The Sky World is a dimension connected to Earth in an alternate universe where the Tesseract fell in the Haudenosaunee Confederacy, in pre-colonial America. The Sky World can be accessed through a portal located in the "Forbidden Lake", at the bottom of which the Tesseract is found.
- The Soul World (based on the Marvel Comics location of the same name), also known as the Way Station, is a pocket dimension inside the Soul Stone which Thanos finds himself in for a brief moment after he snapped his fingers and wiped out half of the Universe's population, where he encountered a young Gamora. Christopher Markus, co-writer of Avengers: Endgame, also stated that Banner met the Hulk in the Soul World. The Soul World was originally also going to be visited by Tony Stark in a deleted scene of Avengers: Endgame, where he would have met an older version of his daughter Morgan; however, in the final cut of the movie, it is where Clint Barton briefly ends up after Natasha Romanoff sacrifices herself for him to obtain the Soul Stone.
- Ta Lo (based on Ta-Lo from the Marvel Comics) is a mystical heavenly realm inhabited by Chinese mythological creatures, such as Chinese dragon (including the Great Protector), fenghuang, shishi, hundun (including Morris), jiuweihu, and qilin. Thousands of years ago, the Dweller-in-Darkness attacked the realm, but was sealed away by the people of Ta Lo and the Great Protector in the Dark Gate. Ta Lo can be accessed from Earth through a portal located in China, which is protected by an enchanted bamboo forest which can be safely traversed through on the first day of the Qingming Festival. In an interview, Shang-Chi and the Legend of the Ten Rings director Destin Daniel Cretton expressed excitement in further exploration of the realm in the future. Due to the enormity and complexity of the landscape, much of the village and its surrounding jungle in the film was digitally created by Rising Sun Pictures, who studied forested locations in Vietnam and Indonesia for inspiration and compiled a vast library of bamboo and other plants. Meanwhile, visual effects for the various mythological creatures were provided by Trixter, with some audiences confusing them with characters from Pokémon in early screenings.

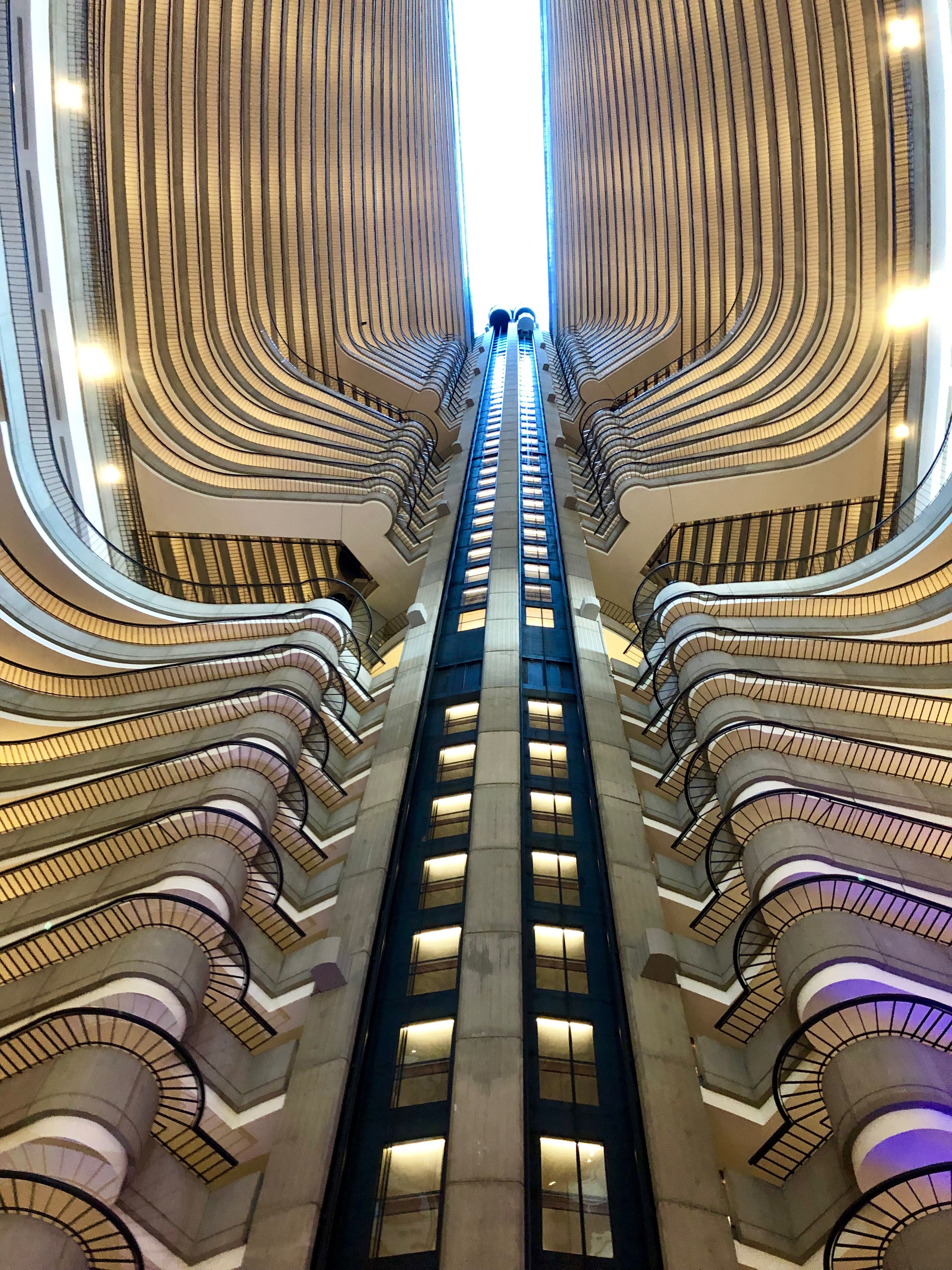
The Atlanta Marriott Marquis was used to portray the TVA Headquarters.

- The TVA Headquarters (based on the Null-Time Zone from the Marvel Comics) is a dimension that exists outside of space and time which acts as the headquarters of the Time Variance Authority (TVA). A Loki variant is brought to the headquarters by the TVA, where he is recruited to help track down another variant of himself. The Atlanta Marriott Marquis hotel in Atlanta, Georgia was used to portray the main building, while working frosted incandescent ceiling lights were used as the set's key lights.
- The Veil of Noor separates Earth from a dimension inhabited by supernatural cosmic beings known as the Clandestines, or the djinn in Pakistani culture. Several individuals were exiled from the Noor dimension to Earth in the 1940s, shortly before the Partition of India. Most seek mystical bangles imbued with Noor power to tear down the Veil and return home. One, named Aisha, fled with one of the bangles, which was passed down through the generations to Kamala Khan.
- The Void, also known as the Void at the End of Time, is a place of existence at the end of time containing the remains of alternate universes pruned by the Time Variance Authority. It is inhabited by Victor Timely/He Who Remains' Alioth, a monstrous cloud-storm universe-devouring entity. It features many Easter eggs from the comics, such as Thanos's helicopter, Throg and his Mjölnir, Qeng Tower, a tower associated with Kang the Conqueror, and the Living Tribunal's head, as well as from the MCU, such as Yellowjacket's helmet, a Helicarrier, and the Dark Aster. It also includes homages to the USS Eldridge, Polybius, and the Ecto Cooler. For the Loki Palace, an underground hideout in the Void where Kid Loki, Classic Loki, Boastful Loki, and Alligator Loki reside, Loki production designer Kasra Farahani acquired a bowling alley from Omaha and shipped it to Pinewood Atlanta Studios in Atlanta, Georgia, where they installed an "old Santa throne from a mall" from another reality.

== Objects ==
=== Vehicles ===
==== Spacecraft ====
- The Benatar is an M-type spaceship used by the Guardians of the Galaxy and piloted by Peter Quill. Named after Pat Benatar, it is acquired after the Milano is severely damaged. After being used to rescue Thor from the remnants of the Statesman, it takes the Guardians to Knowhere and Titan before being carried back to Earth by Carol Danvers. It is used by the Avengers to reach the Garden planet and in the Time Heist. It is succeeded by the Bowie, named after singer David Bowie.
- The Bowie.
- The Chitauri mother ship was a large spaceship which served as the mother ship of the Chitauri army during the Battle of New York. It was destroyed by Tony Stark when he carried a nuclear missile through a wormhole into space, severing the connection between the mothership and the Chitauri as well as the Leviathans and ending the battle. In a deleted scene of Avengers: Endgame, Rocket teases the Avengers about not destroying it earlier.
- The Commodore is one of the Grandmaster's starships, used primarily for self pleasure reasons. It's stolen in Thor: Ragnarok by Thor, Bruce Banner and Valkyrie and is later used by Loki to escape from the destruction of Asgard. In Avengers: Infinity War, its destroyed by Thanos along with the Statesman. In What If...?, an alternate universe version of the ship is stolen by Howard the Duck and Darcy Lewis.
- The Dark Aster is the flagship spaceship of Ronan the Accuser, a three-mile wide ship in the Kree Accusers fleet. Angered by the signing of a peace treaty with the Nova Empire, he used it to attack Xandar, but is destroyed by the Milano. A similar spacecraft known as the Silver Aster is used by him during the Kree–Skrull War. In What If...?, an alternate universe version of the Dark Aster lays siege to Xandar for five years before being destroyed by Nebula. Visual effects of the spaceship were created by Moving Picture Company (MPC) and Sony Pictures Imageworks.
- The Domo is the Eternals' starship which serves as their primary base of operations. Composed of three large, circular rooms, it is completely silent, controlled by the Eternals' golden cosmic energy, and is used by them to arrive on Earth 7,000 years ago. The most important room is known as the "bridge", which contains a large statue of the Celestial Arishem and pattern-covered walls which generate the Eternals' suits; Eternals production designer Eve Stewart explained that the room was designed to look like mosques, synagogues, churches, and temples, and the set was constructed in eight weeks, illuminated by lights through a fiberglass below. Another room contains numerous ancient artifacts and mythological objects, including the Emerald Tablet, King Arthur's Excalibur, and the Holy Grail. The unique design of the ship was inspired by the art of Jack Kirby, meteor dust, as well as sacred geometry, and it is named after the Marvel Comics character of the same name.
- The Eclector is a large spaceship used by Yondu's Ravager clan until its destruction in 2014. However, Yondu managed to escape along with Rocket and Groot on the ship's third quadrant prior to its destruction. Visual effects for scenes set in the spaceship in Guardians of the Galaxy Vol. 2 were provided by Framestore; the destruction of the ship was handled by Weta Digital. A set of the ship was constructed at Pinewood Atlanta Studios in Atlanta, Georgia in sections to provide a 360-degree view of the ship as well as to move sections around and portray different areas of the ship.
- The Excelsior is a spaceship used by the Fantastic Four.
- The Milano is an M-type spaceship flown by Peter Quill since he was ten, named after his childhood crush, Alyssa Milano. It later becomes the main ship for the Guardians of the Galaxy, but is destroyed during the Battle of Xandar. After being rebuilt by the Nova Corps, it is severely damaged by an asteroid field and abandoned on Berhert, with the Benatar becoming the Guardians' new ship. To limit the amount of blue screen the actors had to interact with, interiors for the ship were constructed at Pinewood Atlanta Studios in Atlanta, Georgia for Guardians of the Galaxy Vol. 2, including the cockpit that had been built for the first film and originally stored in London. The real-life Alyssa Milano called the homage "pretty cool" upon learning of the reference. In an alternate reality where T'Challa became Star-Lord, the spaceship is named the Mandela instead, a reference to Nelson Mandela.
- Q-Ships are ring-shaped spaceships used by Thanos and his children. They are stored in the Sanctuary II, and deployed from the ship when invading other planets. The Q-Ships also contain Outrider dropships, allowing them to unleash Outriders onto a battlefield. When Ebony Maw and Cull Obsidian attack New York City in 2018, Doctor Strange is taken prisoner on a Q-Ship until his rescue by Tony Stark and Peter Parker. One is also used by Proxima Midnight and Corvus Glaive to leave Scotland, while another deploys Outrider dropships into the atmosphere during the Battle of Wakanda.
- The Sanctuary II is a 12-mile-long (19 km) long spaceship owned by Thanos, which serves as an orbital base while an invasion is in progress as well as a heavily armed warcraft. It can also carry four Q-Ships under its wings. Following the Time Heist, an alternate version of Thanos and his army from 2014 is transported to 2023 on the Sanctuary II, and the Avengers Compound is destroyed by its missiles. During the subsequent Battle of Earth, Thanos orders his troops to "rain fire" on the battlefield, but the ship is destroyed by Carol Danvers.
- The Silver Surfer's board is a surfboard-like craft given to Shalla-Bal by Galactus when she became his herald. As the Silver Surfer, Shalla-Bal uses the board to travel through space in search of planets for Galactus to feed on.
- The Statesman is a large spaceship owned by the Grandmaster stolen by Loki and used to transport the Asgardians away from Asgard before it is destroyed during Ragnarök. However, on its way to Earth, it is attacked by the Sanctuary II and destroyed by Thanos using the Power Stone.
- The Taa II (based on the Marvel Comics spacecraft of the same name) is Galactus's spacecraft on Earth-828.

==== Aircraft ====
- Asgardian skiffs are a group of hovercraft warships resembling Viking longships used by the Asgardians for transportation and patrol.
- The Fantasticar (based on the Marvel Comics vehicle of the same name) is a flying car owned by the Fantastic Four and used for transportation. Two models of the Fantasticar were made for the filming of The Fantastic Four: First Steps, one that allowed for interior filming with the actors and another that was "stripped down" for use in effects shots. The Fantasticar was based on "mid-'60s American concept cars that were actually referencing European cars". Its accent features, such as its turbine intakes and interface controls, have a 1950s "retrofuture" look.
- Flying cars (based on the Marvel Comics vehicle of the same name) are a type of vehicle that, in addition to moving on land, also function as aircraft. During a presentation at the 1943 World Exposition of Tomorrow hosted by Howard Stark, he unveiled his prototype for a flying car. In 2014, Nick Fury was driving an SUV with flight capabilities when he was the victim of an assassination attempt by Hydra, with the vehicle unable to fly due to the damage sustained in the attack.
- The Goblin Glider (based on the Marvel Comics vehicle of the same name) is a technological, bat-shaped glider that serves as the Green Goblin's primary means of transportation.
- Helicarriers (based on the Marvel Comics vehicle of the same name) are flying aircraft carriers used by S.H.I.E.L.D. as mobile command centers. They are equipped with optical camouflage and, later, large-sized cannons and repulsor engines courtesy of Tony Stark, as well as two stacked carrier decks and a hull number of 64. During the Hydra uprising, Hydra attempts to use three Helicarriers linked to S.H.I.E.L.D. satellites to assassinate potential threats, but they are destroyed by Steve Rogers and his allies. Following the dissolution of S.H.I.E.L.D., the original Helicarrier is recommissioned and used to assist the Avengers during the Battle of Sokovia. In Agents of S.H.I.E.L.D., the original Helicarrier is revealed to have been secretly repaired by Phil Coulson's team and it reappears in active use in the series finale. However, in Secret Invasion, Nick Fury states that the Helicarrier has since been mothballed. Visual effects for the Helicarrier in The Avengers were provided by Industrial Light & Magic (ILM), Scanline VFX, Evil Eye Pictures, and Luma Pictures, while visual effects in Captain America: The Winter Soldier were also provided by ILM.
- Leviathans are large cybernetically enhanced serpentine creatures used by the Chitauri under the command of Thanos to transport troops and warships, weighing approximately three million tonnes each. Following the Battle of New York, the Leviathans are salvaged by Hydra, with one of them stored in the Hydra Research Base in Sokovia. Another group of Leviathans are later used by an alternate version of Thanos from 2014 during the Battle of Earth, and are destroyed by Tony Stark using the Nano Gauntlet.
- Quinjets (based on the Marvel Comics vehicle of the same name) are technologically advanced jets used by S.H.I.E.L.D., the Avengers, and S.T.R.I.K.E. teams. After the Battle of Sokovia, the Hulk leaves on a Quinjet, escaping Earth's atmosphere before crash-landing on Sakaar via a wormhole. The interior of the jet was built for The Avengers and later shipped to Australia for Thor: Ragnarok.
- Thanos-Copter (based on the Marvel Comics vehicle of the same name) is a helicopter that was used by a variant of Thanos before it was sent to the Void.

==== Land vehicles ====
- The Battle Van (based on the Marvel Comics vehicle of the same name) is an armored van used by Frank Castle during his activities as the vigilante Punisher.

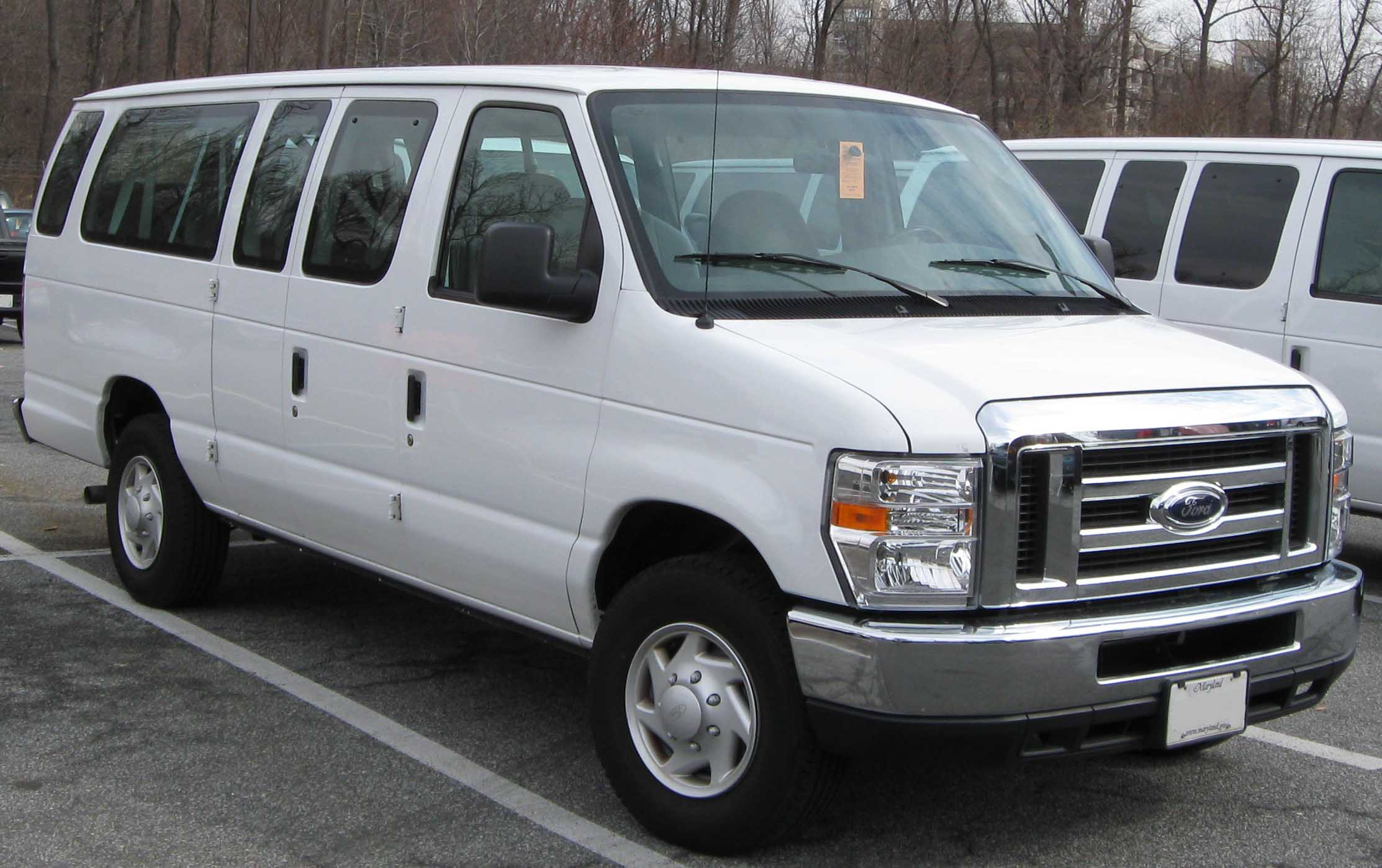
A typical Ford Econoline

- Luis's van is a brown 1972 Ford Econoline owned by Luis and used by him, Scott Lang, Dave, and Kurt. It is later used by them for their company, X-Con Security Consultants, and is outfitted with a miniaturized Quantum Tunnel. Lang is later trapped in the Quantum Realm for five years until a rat ran over the control panel of the Quantum Tunnel, allowing him to escape. It is destroyed by Thanos during the Battle of Earth.

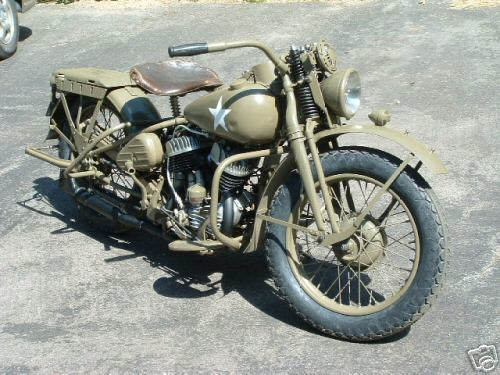
A restored Harley-Davidson WLA

- Steve Rogers's motorcycle is a Harley-Davidson motorcycle used by Steve Rogers. In Captain America: The First Avenger, Rogers uses a weaponized 1942 WLA motorcycle in World War II in his fights against Hydra. In Captain America: The Winter Soldier and The Falcon and the Winter Soldier, this model is shown to be displayed in the Captain America exhibit in the Smithsonian Air and Space Museum. In The Avengers, Rogers is shown to have switched to a Softail Slim model for commuting around New York City, before using the Street 750 model when fleeing from pursuing Hydra agents in The Winter Soldier. Rogers later uses other models such as the Breakout, V-Rod and the Softail Slim S.
- The Wakandan maglev train is an advanced maglev train used for public transport in Golden City, Wakanda, as well as for transporting vibranium inside the mines in Mount Bashenga. The train has been used to compare Wakanda's Afrofuturism with transport infrastructure in the United States.

==== Ships ====
- The Iliad is an aircraft carrier in the second season of Agents of S.H.I.E.L.D. operated by Robert Gonzales and his S.H.I.E.L.D. faction as their headquarters. Having survived the HYDRA uprising, Gonzales and his faction saw themselves as the true S.H.I.E.L.D. until Phil Coulson's team earned their trust following the events of Avengers: Age of Ultron, causing the two factions to merge. The Iliad was later the scene of a battle between S.H.I.E.L.D. and Jiaying who sought to induce terragenesis in all Inhumans. During the battle, the Quinjet carrying the necessary crystals was blasted off of the ship and into the ocean where the crystals would spread throughout the ocean's ecosystem.
- The Lemurian Star is a ship owned by S.H.I.E.L.D. and used to launch Project Insight satellites. During the Hydra Uprising, the ship is hijacked by a group of pirates led by Georges Batroc and under the employment of Nick Fury, until a S.T.R.I.K.E. team arrives to retake the ship. Captain Carter replicates the mission in an alternate reality before being recruited to the Guardians of the Multiverse by the Watcher, later discovering the Hydra Stomper armor with someone inside. Scenes set on the ship in Captain America: The Winter Soldier were filmed on the Sea Launch Commander docked in Long Beach, California.

=== Suits ===
- The Ant-Man suit (based on the Marvel Comics suit of the same name) enables the wearer to change size while retaining strength, as well as communicate with and control ants. It was designed by Hank Pym and used during S.H.I.E.L.D. missions until the Pym Particles began to have an effect on him, and is later stolen by Scott Lang, who becomes the next Ant-Man. Double Negative and Industrial Light & Magic (ILM) worked on Ant-Man's shrinking effect in the first film, which shows the outline of his body as in the comics.
  - Similar to the Ant-Man suit, the Wasp suit (based on the Marvel Comics suit of the same name) utilises Pym Particles and enables the wearer to change size using special regulators, but most notably also features wings that expand when the wearer shrinks. The suit also include wrist adapters which allows the wearer to blast their enemies. The suit was first designed by Hank Pym and Janet van Dyne for Janet's use during S.H.I.E.L.D. missions. The two begin work on a second suit for their daughter Hope van Dyne, in which she utilises for the film Ant-Man and the Wasp (2018). In Ant-Man and the Wasp: Quantumania (2023), Van Dyne's suit is upgraded to feature more yellow colours, similar to the comic version of the Wasp suit.

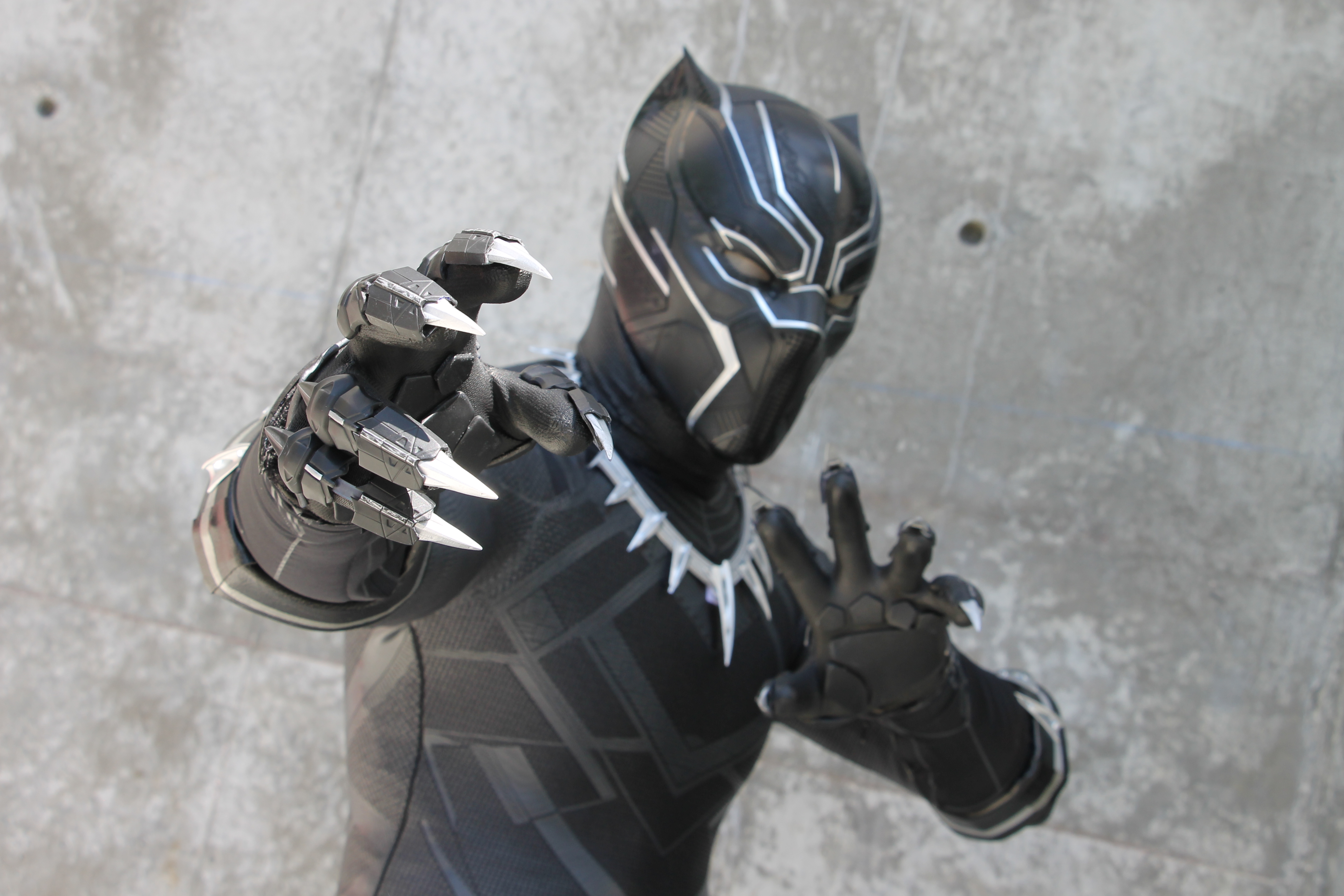
A cosplay of the Black Panther suit at FanimeCon 2018

- The Black Panther suit is a protective nanotech suit woven from vibranium that is worn by the King of Wakanda in his duties as the Black Panther. The suit features retractable claws made of vibranium and is nearly impenetrable. Versions of the suit have been worn by T'Chaka, T'Challa, N'Jadaka, and Shuri. T'Challa's second suit is also able to be shrunk down into a necklace as well as absorb energy for future redistribution. The suit is a combination of a practical costume and visual effects, featuring a vibranium mesh weave similar to chainmail. Captain America: Civil War costume designer Judianna Makovsky called the Black Panther costume "difficult" since "you needed sort of a feline body, but it's hard and practical at the same time. You needed a feeling of some sort of ethnicity in there, but of a world [Wakanda] we weren't really creating yet, so you didn't want to go too far and say too much about that world."
- Captain America's uniform (based on the Marvel Comics suit of the same name) is the costume worn by the bearers of the Captain America mantle whilst on missions.
  - The first uniform, worn by Steve Rogers, is a cloth USO costume based on his original costume from the comics, along with a heater shield. Upon hearing that Bucky Barnes' unit was MIA, he alters his USO uniform for the rescue mission, wearing a combat jacket and pants over the costume and donning a blue helmet from a USO chorus girl. Howard Stark later designs a combat uniform made of carbon polymer, with leather pouches and a holster, a wingless mask, and a round vibranium shield. After being unfrozen, he uses a costume designed by S.H.I.E.L.D. which resembles his USO uniform. During his time with S.T.R.I.K.E., he uses a new uniform designed for stealth missions which has a darker shade of blue. He later returns to a variant of his World War II costume, taken from a display at the Captain America exhibit at the Smithsonian. Tony Stark later creates a new uniform for Rogers, which incorporates magnetic gauntlets, allowing him to recall his shield. A slightly different version of this suit is used during the Avengers Civil War. During his exile, the suit is altered to remove the star and the Avengers logo. He is equipped with Wakandan shields on his arms before the Battle of Wakanda. After the Avengers reunite, he uses another new uniform.
  - When John Walker is handed the Captain America mantle, he uses an entirely new design, based on that from the comics: the uniform is blue, with red highlights and chest stripes, and includes red fingerless gloves. In place of the Avengers logo, it has the flag of the United States on the arms, and a stylized star on the mask and chest. He also carries a handgun and a version of Captain America's shield given by Steve Rogers to Sam Wilson. After he is stripped of the title, he builds a new shield, and dyes his uniform black, becoming the "U.S. Agent".
  - Sam Wilson dons a new version of the uniform as the new Captain America, incorporating his new vibranium wings. This version, a gift from Wakanda, sticks closely to the version that he wears in the comics, with the main color being white. The star design spreads across the whole chest, and resembles the logo of the U.S. Air Force. The white mask incorporates Wilson's red goggles and stretches from the shoulders to just above his ears.
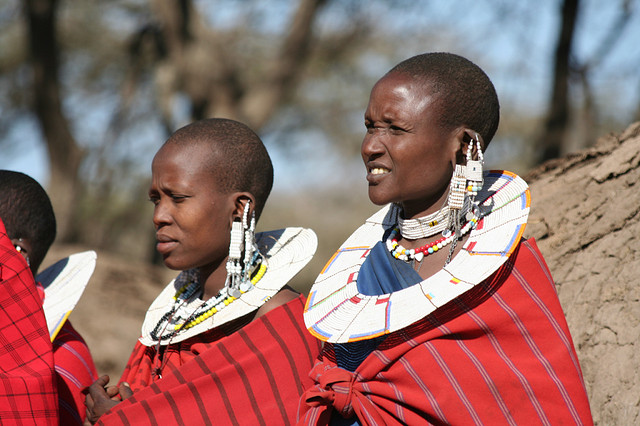
The Maasai people of Kenya (top) inspired about 80% of the design of the Dora Milaje, Wakanda's all-female special forces (bottom).
- The Dora Milaje uniform is the uniform worn by the Dora Milaje of Wakanda. It is made up of a body suit, harness, vibranium shoulder armor, neck rings, knee-high boots, and a waist cape. Silver rings are worn on the neck and arms (with the exception of Okoye, whose rings are gold to denote her status as general). The design of the uniform was partially inspired by tribal Filipino costume, as well as African influences. Black Panther costume designer Ruth E. Carter wanted to avoid the "girls in the bathing suits" look, and instead had the Dora Milaje wear full armor that they would practically need for battle. Anthony Francisco, the Senior Visual Development Illustrator, noted the Dora Milaje costumes were based 80 percent on the Maasai people, five percent on samurai, five percent on ninjas, and five percent on the Ifugao people from the Philippines.
- The EXO-7 Falcon is a winged harness created by the U.S. military for the Air National Guard. It is used by former Pararescuemen Sam Wilson and Riley, the latter of whom was killed during a mission. Sam then left active duty and joined the Avengers after assisting Steve Rogers and Natasha Romanoff during the Hydra Uprising. The suit features retractable wings and a pair of collapsible Steyr SPP submachine guns. Tony Stark later creates a new set of bulletproof retractable wings, featuring a drone as well as missiles and a wrist-mounted submachine gun. During a battle with John Walker, the suit is severely damaged beyond repair, and Sam leaves it with Joaquin Torres.
- Iron Man's armor (based on the Marvel Comics suit of the same name) is a set of armored suits created by Tony Stark to combat threats. Most follow the same red and gold color scheme and contain similar functions. Stark would eventually create up to 85 armors, 34 of which are part of the original "Iron Legion". Many of his early suits were highly mobile and versatile, with the ability to be transformed or stored in various objects including a suitcase (Mark V), a cylindrical pod (Mark VII), and detachable parts (Mark XLII). Eventually, beginning with the Mark L armor, Stark is able to store his armor in the form of nanobots in his arc reactor which could flow over his body, assembling based on cybernetic commands, allowing Stark to create endless combinations and new weapons to manifest out of the armor.
  - The Hulkbuster armor (based on the Marvel Comics suit of the same name) is a modular add-on to Tony Stark's regular armor. Developed by Stark and Bruce Banner, its purpose is to restrain the Hulk and minimize the damage caused by him. The first-generation armor (the Iron Man Mark XLIV armor) is remotely controlled by a mobile service module named Veronica (named after the Archie Comics character Veronica Lodge) and is used to restrain the Hulk following a rampage by him in Johannesburg, South Africa. In 2018, Banner is seen wearing an upgraded version of the armor (the Iron Man Mark XLVIII armor), which he uses during the Battle of Wakanda and the killing of Thanos.
  - The Hydra Stomper armor is a suit of armor built by Howard Stark for Steve Rogers during World War II as the Hydra Stomper in an alternate reality in which Peggy Carter becomes Captain Carter. Powered by the Tesseract, the writers of What If...? originally named the armor the "Hydra Smasher" before Kevin Feige suggested the name change.
  - The Iron Legion (based on the Marvel Comics element of the same name) is two separate sets of armor built by Tony Stark. The first is a set of specialized armors (the Mark VIII–XLI armors) built due to his insomnia for various situations that he might encounter, which he uses against A.I.M. He eventually destroys them due to the friction they cause between him and Pepper. The second set is a series of drones built by Stark to aid the Avengers, which are later taken control by Ultron and destroyed in battle with the Avengers.
  - The Iron Monger armor (based on the Marvel Comics suit of the same name) is an armored suit similar to the Iron Man armor. After Obadiah Stane gains Stark's salvaged Mark I armor from the Ten Rings, he reverse engineers it to create an even more powerful suit with added weapons, such as a minigun on the right arm. The suit is powered by Stark's personal arc reactor, forcing Stark to use a replacement to power his own suit, although he manages to defeat Stane.
  - The Iron Spider armor (based on the Marvel Comics suit of the same name), also known as Item 17A, is an armored nanotech suit created by Tony Stark for Peter Parker's use as an Avenger. The suit features four mechanical legs that can be unfolded from the back of the suit, allowing enhanced mobility and climbing skills, as well as web-shooters. Following his fight with the Vulture, Stark offers Parker the suit and membership to the Avengers, but Parker declines both. Two years later, Stark uses it to rescue Parker after he falls from Ebony Maw's Q-Ship, and Parker uses it during the Battle of Titan, the Battle of Earth, and a local charity event. The suit was then confiscated by the Department of Damage Control, but Parker eventually got it back and used it to find an MIT administrator, and later to battle Otto Octavius. For the suit's first appearance at the end of Spider-Man: Homecoming, Framestore created models and textures in anticipation for future MCU projects, while Trixter created the "clean, high tech" vault that the suit appears in.
  - The Rescue armor (based on the Marvel Comics suit of the same name), also known as the Iron Man Mark XLIX armor, is an armored nanotech suit created by Tony Stark for his wife, Pepper Potts. It features a blue and silver color scheme, and many of the same abilities as Iron Man's armor. Potts uses it in the Battle of Earth against Thanos and his forces.
  - The War Machine armor (based on the Marvel Comics suit of the same name) is a powered suit of armor originally developed by Tony Stark as the Iron Man Mark II armor before it is confiscated by James Rhodes and enhanced by Justin Hammer with machine guns in the wrists, a minigun on the right shoulder and a grenade launcher on the left, weapons which later proved to be ineffective. Stark later removes the modifications and rebuilds the suit himself using his own superior technology. This upgraded suit is briefly given a red, white, and blue color scheme and renamed the Iron Patriot by the U.S. government. It is later changed back to the gray color scheme and upgraded again, but accidentally disabled by the Vision mid-flight during the Avengers Civil War, causing Rhodes to crash and become paralyzed. For the Battle of Earth, Rhodes dons a new suit reminiscent of the original Iron Patriot armor, featuring multiple advanced weapons such as rocket launchers.
- The Spider-Man suit (based on the Marvel Comics suit of the same name) is a suit worn by Peter Parker while fighting crime as the vigilante known as Spider-Man. His first suit, a simple homemade costume, consisted of a red hoodie, blue pants, a blue shirt, a red mask with black goggles, and homemade Web-shooters. After Tony Stark recruits him during the Avengers Civil War, he is given a new, more advanced suit, featuring a more modern and streamlined design, a built-in AI, improved goggles, a remote drone, a holographic interface, a parachute, a tracking device, a heater, an airbag, and more advanced Web-shooters. Joe Russo described this suit as "a slightly more traditional, Steve Ditko influenced suit", while Spider-Man: Homecoming co-producer Eric Hauserman Carroll noted that Marvel intentionally included many "fun and wacky" features from the comics in the suit. He ceases to use this suit during the Infinity War, instead using the Iron Spider armor, which offers more protection and abilities. In an effort to conceal Spider-Man's identity, Talos (disguised as Nick Fury) has a seamstress make Peter a new stealth suit in Europe, later dubbed the "Night Monkey" suit by Ned Leeds. This version is entirely black in color, with the hood consisting of a black mask and flip-up goggles. After the suit is stolen by a prison warden, Peter builds himself a new one using the late Stark's technology, which he uses during his battle against Mysterio in London. Upon the arrival of multiple villains from alternate realities due to Stephen Strange's miscasting of a spell intended to erase the world's knowledge of his identity as Spider-Man, Parker battles a displaced Otto Octavius, who damages the Iron Spider armor and forces Parker to use his defaced red-and-black suit inside-out; after Octavius is cured, he returns the nanotechnology which his tentacles had absorbed onto Parker, embellishing it into a more advanced suit. Later, after Strange erases the world's knowledge of Parker's existence, reconcealing his secret identity as Spider-Man, Parker once again dons a brand new red-and-blue suit stitched from homemade materials in his apartment. Trixter provided visual effects for the Stark suit and the spider drone in Spider-Man: Homecoming, and also applied a rigging, muscle and cloth system to Sony Pictures Imageworks' homemade suit to "mimic the appearance of the rather loose training suit".
- Thanos's armor is a suit of armor worn by Thanos during his time as a warlord. It consists of a helmet, breastplate, greaves, cuisses, gauntlets, and metal boots. He discards the armor following his attack on the Statesman, and uses it as a scarecrow after he completes his mission and retires to the Garden. An alternate version of Thanos from 2014 wears the armor during the Battle of Earth, during which the armor is heavily damaged by Wanda Maximoff. The armor is eventually destroyed by Tony Stark. Gamora kills Thanos in an alternate reality before seizing his armor and blade.
- The Time Suits, also known as the Advanced Tech Suits or Quantum Suits, are a variation of the Ant-Man suit, allowing the Avengers to shrink down to microscopic size and travel back in time through the Quantum Realm. They are used by the surviving Avengers and Guardians of the Galaxy. The suits as depicted in Avengers: Endgame were entirely digital creations, and were designed by Marvel Studios head of visual development Ryan Meinerding as a combination of Ant-Man, Iron Man, and the Guardians' technologies.

=== Weapons ===
- The All-Father is a powerful sword made of vibranium, given as a coronation gift to King Thor by T'Chaka, King of Wakanda, in a Renaissance-themed universe. Similar to both Mjolnir and Stormbreaker, the All-Father allows its wielder to channel lightning.
- Bucky Barnes's prosthetic arm (based on the Marvel Comics object of the same name) is a metal prosthesis worn on the left arm by Bucky Barnes. The original arm is created by Hydra after Barnes falls off a train during World War II, and contains a red star on the shoulder. In 2016, the original arm is destroyed by Tony Stark during the Avengers Civil War. In 2018, a new vibranium arm is created by Shuri and contains a fail-safe that removes it. In 2025, the arm is stolen and given to Rocket Raccoon. Visual effects for the arm were completed by Luma Pictures in Captain America: Civil War.

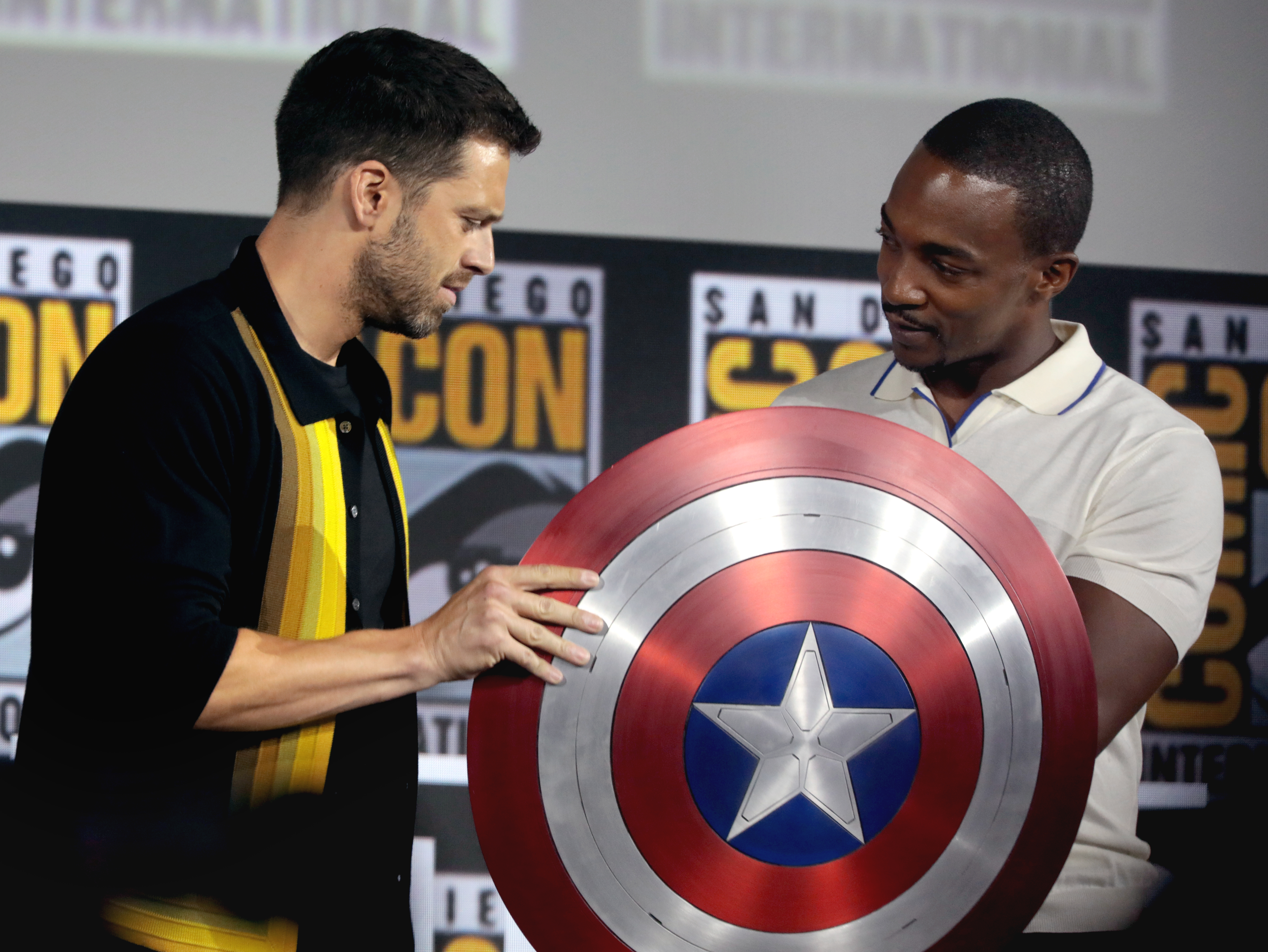
The shield, as depicted in the MCU, being held by Anthony Mackie and Sebastian Stan, who portray Sam Wilson and Bucky Barnes respectively, at the 2019 San Diego Comic-Con

- Captain America's shield (based on the Marvel Comics object of the same name) is a weapon made of vibranium used by the bearers of the Captain America mantle, including Steve Rogers, John Walker, and Sam Wilson. It is created by Howard Stark and given to Rogers during World War II. The shield is destroyed during the Battle of Earth. After Rogers's retirement, an alternate version of the shield is given by Wilson to the Smithsonian, but the government passes it to John Walker, who uses it to murder a Flag Smasher. After he is stripped away of his title as Captain America, John Walker creates a new homemade shield from scrap metal and his Medal of Honor, which he later abandons in New York City. The shield is seen as a symbol of Captain America's strength and legacy. A replica of the shield also appears in Iron Man and Iron Man 2, which director Jon Favreau included because he felt it was important to include inside references for fans of the comics.
- Chitauri guns were the primary weapons used by the Chitauri during the Battle of New York. Many of these guns were abandoned on Earth and salvaged by various humans in attempts to reverse-engineer them.
- Daredevil's billy club is the primary weapon used by Matt Murdock during his activities as the vigilante Daredevil.
- The Destroyer (based on the Marvel Comics object of the same name) is an automaton used by Odin to stop threats such as the Frost Giants. Loki later uses it to attack Thor on Earth before Thor regains his powers and kills the Destroyer. Later, parts of it were reassembled by S.H.I.E.L.D. agents into a prototype gun which was later used by Phil Coulson in the film The Avengers and the ABC series Agents of S.H.I.E.L.D. In an early version of the screenplay for Thor: Ragnarok, Hela easily defeats the Destroyer, but this idea was abandoned.
- The Ebony Blade (based on the Marvel Comics object of the same name) is an ancient sword that belongs to Dane Whitman.
- Extremis (based on the Marvel Comics object of the same name) is a form of genetic manipulation developed by Maya Hansen. It gives a person an advanced healing factor, meaning that they are able to regenerate from injury, deformities, and psychological trauma, as well as the ability to generate fire. Aldrich Killian uses it to heal his weak physique and cure injured war veterans such as Eric Savin and Ellen Brandt. Later, Extremis is a part of the Centipede Serum with HYDRA figuring out how to stabilize it using the abnormal blood platelets of pyrokinetic Chan Ho Yin. The rebel Skrull Gravik uses Extremis as part of his Super-Skrull program, and uses it on himself, as he heals himself after being stabbed in the hand by Talos and he quickly heals from being shot several times by Nick Fury, including from having part of his face blown off. G'iah also secretly uses it while working undercover in Gravik's organization which allows her to survive Gravik's attempt to kill her when G'iah is exposed as a spy. During the final battle between the two Super-Skrulls, Extremis repeatedly heals their injuries until G'iah delivers a fatal wound that even Extremis can't heal using Captain Marvel's powers.
- Gungnir (based on the Norse mythological object of the same name) was Odin's spear, capable of channelling the Odinforce. It has also been used by Loki and Thor. The spear was presumably destroyed during Ragnarök.
- Hawkeye's bow and quiver are a pair of tools used by Clint Barton that serve as his primary weapons. The bow is a collapsible recurve bow, whilst the quiver is mechanized, able to store and deploy his signature trick arrows. After the Blip, he swaps his bow for a katana which he uses to murder criminals such as the Japanese Yakuza.
- Hofund (based on the Norse mythological object of the same name), also known as the Bifröst Sword, is a magical sword used by Heimdall (and, during his exile, Skurge) that is able to channel the Bifröst. It also served as the key to activate the Bifröst. It is last used by Heimdall to transport the Hulk to Earth before he is killed by Thanos, and was presumably destroyed along with the Statesman.

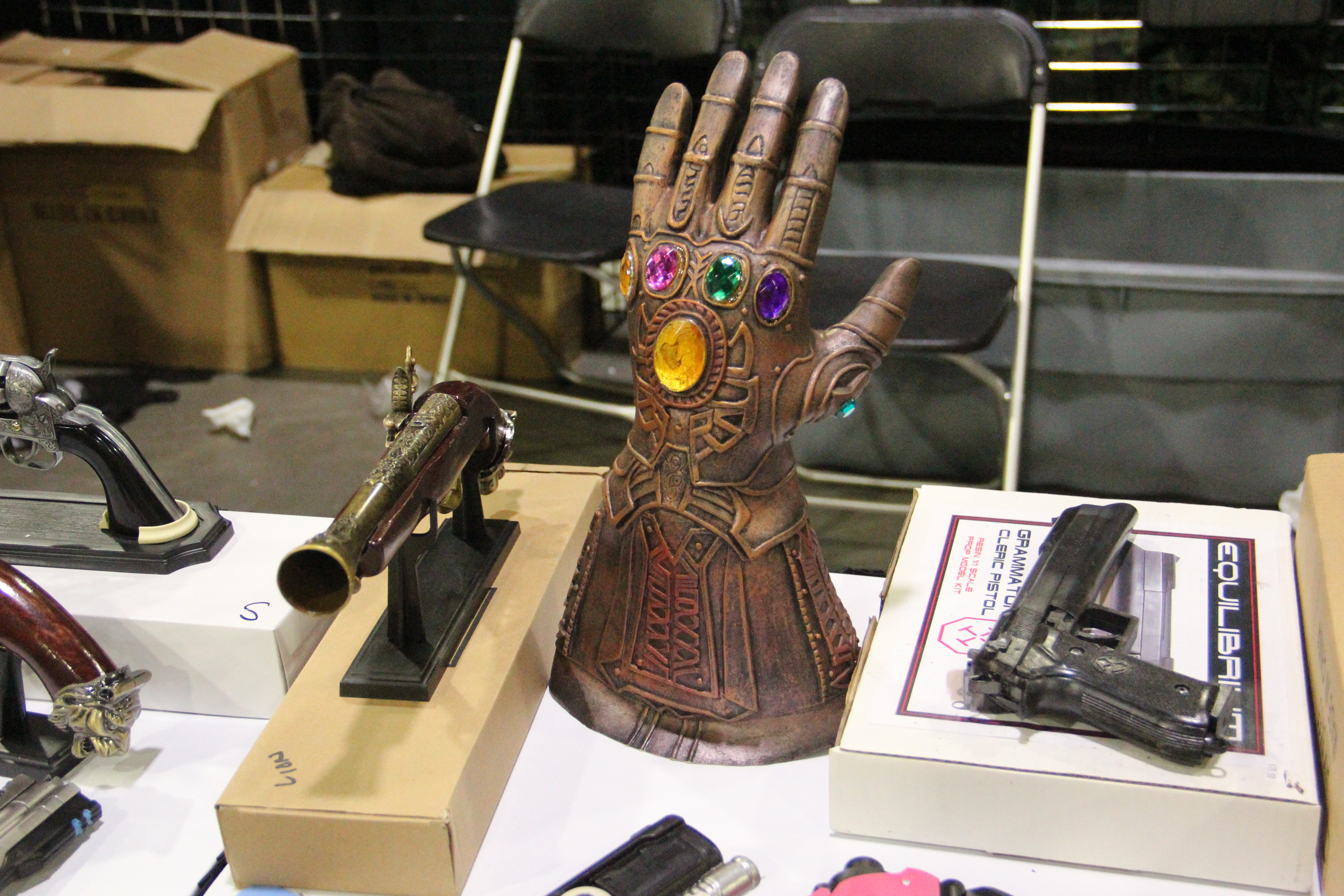
A model of the Infinity Gauntlet at the 2018 Atlanta Comic-Con

- The Infinity Gauntlet (based on the Marvel Comics object of the same name) is a left-handed metal gauntlet owned by Thanos and forged from uru by Eitri and the Dwarves of Nidavellir. It is capable of harnessing the power of all six Infinity Stones at once, thus making the wearer able to do anything in their imagination. A replica of the Gauntlet is also kept by Odin in his vault on Asgard, which originally appeared in Thor as an Easter egg before Marvel Studios realized that it could not be the actual one and formulated an internal theory that the gauntlet was a fake, which led to a scene in Thor: Ragnarok where Hela declares it fake.
- The Jericho is an experimental guided missile developed by Stark Industries for the United States Armed Forces that can separate into 16 smaller missiles when launched. At a demonstration for the weapon in Afghanistan, Tony Stark's convoy is ambushed, and he is captured by the Ten Rings, who forces him to build the missile for them. However, Stark secretly builds the first Iron Man armor and escapes.
- Loki's scepter, also known as the Chitauri Scepter or simply as the Scepter, is a bladed weapon with an extendable handle given as a gift to Loki by Thanos. It has a blue gem at the top containing the Mind Stone, allowing Loki to brainwash and mind control others by touching them with it. After the Battle of New York, it is taken by Hydra agents disguised as S.T.R.I.K.E. team agents and used by Strucker and Dr. List to unlock and amplify Wanda and Pietro Maximoff's abilities. It is later recaptured by the Avengers and used by Tony Stark and Bruce Banner to create Ultron. Ultron then uses it to brainwash Helen Cho, who in turn creates the Vision, with the gem becoming embedded in his forehead. During the Time Heist, Steve Rogers uses his knowledge of the future to gain the Scepter from the S.T.R.I.K.E. team before using it to brainwash an alternate version of himself.

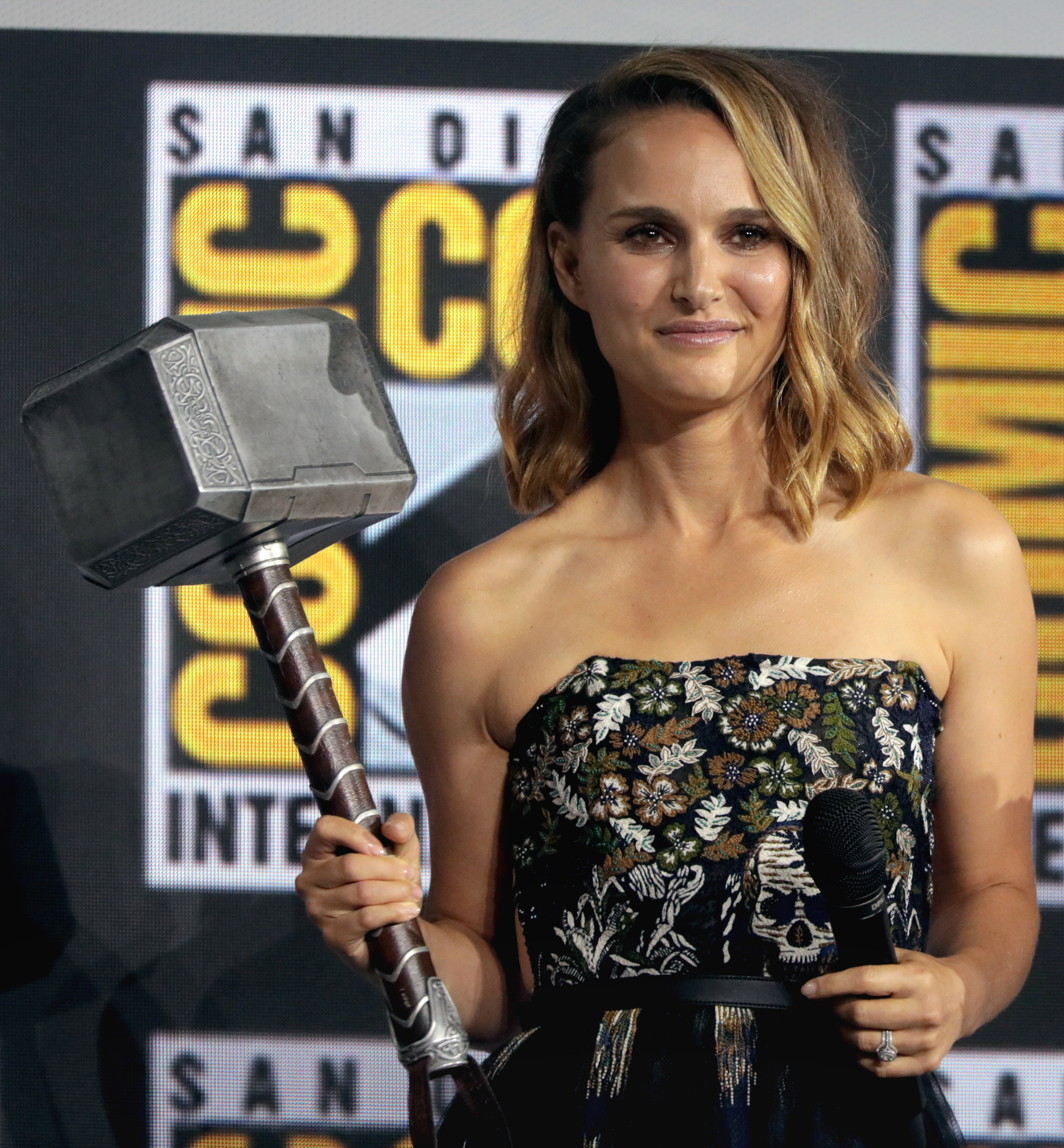
Mjölnir, as depicted in the Marvel Cinematic Universe, being held by Natalie Portman, who portrays Jane Foster, at the 2019 San Diego Comic-Con

- Mjölnir (based on the Marvel Comics object of the same name) is an enchanted hammer owned by Thor (and previously, Hela) and made of uru by the Dwarves of Nidavellir that is capable of controlling lightning and allows the user to fly if it is spun rapidly and released with enough power. Before Thor is banished to Earth, Odin enchants the hammer so that only those deemed "worthy" would be able to wield it and be granted the power of Thor, which include Vision and Steve Rogers. An alternate version of the hammer is acquired by Thor during the Time Heist, and is later returned to its original timeline by Rogers. The hammer is also used by Jane Foster when she becomes the Mighty Thor in Thor: Love and Thunder.
- The Nano Gauntlet, also known as the Iron Gauntlet or the Power Gauntlet, is a right-handed metal gauntlet created by Tony Stark, Bruce Banner, and Rocket using Stark nanotechnology. It was designed to harness the power of the Infinity Stones akin to the Infinity Gauntlet and created to reverse the Blip. After the Avengers retrieve alternate versions of the six Infinity Stones during the Time Heist, Smart Hulk uses it to snap his fingers and resurrect the lives of half the Universe before an alternate version of Thanos from 2014 arrives and attempts to acquire the Gauntlet for himself. During the subsequent Battle of Earth, the gauntlet is passed around multiple individuals before ending up in the hands of Thanos, but the Stones are secretly removed by Tony Stark, who snaps his fingers and disintegrates Thanos and his army.
- The Necroswords (based on the Marvel Comics object of the same name) were obsidian swords generated and handled by the Asgardian goddess of death, Hela, powered with the necro-energy that she transforms from the power she draws from Asgard. In Thor: Love and Thunder, the necrosword was a powerful weapon wielded by the Dark Shadow Lord and later by Gorr the God Butcher. Gorr obtained the sword from the deceased Shadow Lord and used it to slay his first god.
- The Pumpkin Bombs (based on the Marvel Comics object of the same name) are high-tech, pumpkin-shaped explosives created and used by the Green Goblin.
- The Quad Blasters are Peter Quill's primary weapons. The blasters have two separate triggers controlling two separate barrels, which are fired using the index and middle finger. The bottom barrel of each gun fires non-lethal electric shots, while the top barrel fires lethal plasma shots. Prop master Russell Bobbitt created two sets of the blasters for Guardians of the Galaxy Vol. 2, which contained removable blaster cartridges.
- Reset charges are contraptions used by the Time Variance Authority (TVA) to "prune" alternate timelines, erasing them from existence to preserve the Sacred Timeline. Michael Waldron, the head writer of Loki, said the charges use magic "or perhaps something a bit more technical", and that the audience is "kind of in the dark with what is exactly is going on with these reset charges". They are later used by Sylvie to "bomb" the Sacred Timeline.
- The Shocker's gauntlet is a mechanical weapon originally owned by Brock Rumlow and ripped off by Steve Rogers in Lagos. The gauntlet is then recovered by the Department of Damage Control and stolen by Adrian Toomes. Phineas Mason modifies the gauntlet before passing it to Jackson Brice, who uses the gauntlet while calling himself the "Shocker". After Brice is disintegrated, it is used by Herman Schultz until his defeat at the hands of Spider-Man. Visual effects for the gauntlet were provided by Trixter in Spider-Man: Homecoming.
- Shuri's gauntlets are a pair of vibranium gauntlets designed and used by Shuri. Shaped like a panther's head, they emit a powerful sonic blast capable of subduing a Black Panther. They are ultimately destroyed by Killmonger. After Killmonger's demise at the hands of her brother, T'Challa, Shuri designs a second pair which she uses during the Battle of Wakanda and the Battle of Earth.
- Stormbreaker (based on the Marvel Comics object of the same name) is a large battle axe made of uru and forged by Thor and the dwarf king Eitri. The weapon, meant to be the most powerful in the Asgardian king's arsenal, has powers similar to Mjölnir and is also capable of summoning the Bifröst. Unlike Mjölnir, Stormbreaker has no worthiness enchantment, allowing anyone to wield it. Thor nearly dies trying to create it, but before its completion, so Groot cuts off his own arm to hastily finish Stormbreaker and then Thor heals himself with the completed Stormbreaker. Thor then uses it to defeat the Outriders in Wakanda, attack Thanos, kill him on the Garden, and during the Battle of Earth.
- The Ten Rings (based on the Mandarin's rings from the Marvel Comics) are a set of ten mystical iron rings used by Wenwu and Shang-Chi, which provide the namesake and emblem for the criminal organization of the same name. The Rings grant their user enhanced strength and longevity, emit concussive energy blasts, and can be telepathically controlled as projectiles and tendrils. The appearance of the aura projected by the rings varies on the user, with Wenwu's resembling violent blue lightning and Shang-Chi's resembling graceful orange flames to reflect their distinct personalities. According to Shang-Chi and the Legend of the Ten Rings producer Jonathan Schwartz, the Rings were changed from being worn on the fingers as rings as in the comics to being worn on the wrists was due to its impracticality and similarity with the Infinity Stones. Director Destin Daniel Cretton also noted that more material regarding the Rings were created but purposely withheld so that they can be explored in future projects, while the film's mid-credits scene was written to leave the Rings' origins ambiguous so that they can be explored in the future. Visual effects for the Rings were provided by Weta Digital in Shang-Chi, who originally gave the Rings different colors for every functionality; Marvel Studios concept artist Jerad S. Marantz also considered making the Rings green. The Ten Rings were later integrated into mainstream Marvel Universe.
- Thanos's blade is a large double-sided sword used by an alternate version of Thanos from 2014 during the Battle of Earth. Thanos uses it to break Captain America's shield as well as Luis's van before it is destroyed by Wanda Maximoff using her telekinetic powers. The blade's design was based on a helicopter used by Thanos in the comics, an easter egg which Thanos creator Jim Starlin criticized. Gamora kills Thanos in an alternate reality before seizing his armor and blade.
- Time Sticks are batons used by Minutemen of the Time Variance Authority (TVA) to "prune" variants. Ravonna Renslayer, a former Hunter for the TVA, also wields a baton, which she uses against Loki and Sylvie. When designing the pruning effect for Loki, visual effects vendor FuseFX sought to differentiate it from the Blip, taking inspiration from the documentary series Cosmos: A Spacetime Odyssey.
- Ulysses Klaue's prosthetic arm is a prosthetic arm used by Ulysses Klaue after his arm was chopped off by Ultron. Actually a modified Wakandan tool used for mining vibranium, it functioned as a sonic cannon, capable of shooting out high-energy blasts powerful enough to destroy a car and temporarily subdue a Black Panther. The sonic cannon could be retracted and hidden inside the prosthesis when not in use. It was later destroyed by T'Challa during a skirmish in Busan, Korea.
- The Web-shooters (based on the Marvel Comics object of the same name) are a pair of electromechanical gauntlets developed by Peter Parker for his use as the crime-fighter known as Spider-Man. They are capable of shooting synthetic webbing stored in small cartridges on the gauntlets. The first version of the Web-shooters, which were homemade by Parker, are upgraded by Tony Stark before the Avengers Civil War. This version has a variety of different settings, a capability first teased in the mid-credits scene of Captain America: Civil War. This was compared by Spider-Man: Homecoming co-producer Eric Hauserman Carroll to a DSLR camera. Visual effects for the synthetic webbing were provided by Digital Domain and Sony Pictures Imageworks in Spider-Man: Homecoming, who based the design on polar bear hair due to its translucent nature as well as its design in Civil War and previous Spider-Man films. The Iron Spider armor also features its own Web-shooters, which are more streamlined and technologically advanced. After Stark's death, Peter uses his technology to craft himself a new pair after his old ones are destroyed.
- The Widow's Bite (based on the Marvel Comics object of the same name) is an electroshock weapon used by Natasha Romanoff in combat. Created by S.H.I.E.L.D., it delivers powerful electrical discharges from two gauntlets worn on the wrists. Tony Stark later creates a more powerful version for her, which causes the piping in her suit to light up and glow. It has been used by Romanoff to momentarily disable the Winter Soldier's metal arm and the Black Panther suit, as well as to attack other Black Widows in the Red Room.
- The Yaka arrow (based on the Marvel Comics object of the same name) is a sound-sensitive arrow owned by Yondu Udonta. Made of Yaka metal by the Centaurians, it is controlled by a red fin worn on Yondu's head combined with his whistling, and is carried in a holster on his belt when not in use. His use of the arrow is extremely skilled, allowing him to accurately control its direction and speed, killing multiple beings within seconds. After Yondu's death, Kraglin acquires the arrow and a new cybernetic head fin, but struggles to control his arrow due to his lack of experience.

=== Artifacts ===
- The Amulet of Power (based on the Marvel Comics object of the same name) is a mystical artifact used by the masked vigilante Hector Ayala / White Tiger that grants him superhuman powers. After Hector's death, his niece Angela del Toro came to possess the amulet.
- The Bloodstone is a red gem owned by the Bloodstone family, first wielded by Ulysses Bloodstone. Following Ulysses's death, his widow Verussa organizes a competition between monster hunters to determine its new wielder. Verussa uses the Bloodstone to force Jack Russell into his werewolf form, who kills her, and the gem is left behind with Verussa and Ulysses's estranged daughter Elsa. The Bloodstone is the only object with color for the majority of Werewolf by Night, and grants its wielder increased strength and longevity.
- The Book of Cagliostro is an ancient spellbook housed in the Ancient One's private library in Kamar-Taj. The book focuses on dark magic, causing many students who studied the book to lose their way. Kaecilius tears pages out of the book to allow him to perform a ritual to contact Dormammu and draw energy from the Dark Dimension, extending his life forever. Stephen Strange also studies the book, learning how to use the Eye of Agamotto.
- The Casket of Ancient Winters (based on the Marvel Comics object of the same name) is a relic owned and used by the Frost Giants. When opened, it projects an icy wind that freezes everything in its path, and can plunging an entire planet into an ice age. The Casket is captured in 965 AD by the Asgardians, who stored it in Odin's vault. Over a millennium later, Frost Giants attack Asgard, seeking to reclaim the Casket, but are once again defeated. It is presumably destroyed during Ragnarök.
- The Cloak of Levitation (based on the Marvel Comics object of the same name) is a magical relic that enables its user to levitate. It is among the relics owned by the Masters of the Mystic Arts stored in the New York Sanctum. It "chooses" Stephen Strange as its master during a fight with Kaecilius. It has a consciousness of its own and is able to move independently and defend Strange against threats. It is used by Strange during the Battle of Titan and the Battle of Earth. During the battle with the universe-displaced villains, the Cloak saves Ned Leeds's life, apparently of its own volition, when he falls off of the Statue of Liberty. Visual effects for the artifact were provided by Framestore in Doctor Strange.
- The Crimson Bands of Cyttorak (based on the Marvel Comics character of the same name) is a magical wooden relic housed in the New York Sanctum. When thrown at an opponent, it restrains them, binding their hands behind their back, with Stephen Strange using it on Kaecilius in Doctor Strange. A second, more comics-accurate version is manifested during Strange's fight with Thanos, a spell that appears as red bands. Visual effects for the original version were provided by Framestore in Doctor Strange.
- The Darkhold (based on the Marvel Comics object of the same name), also known as the Book of the Damned, is a magical grimoire that corrupts the reader. Containing spells written by the demon Chthon on Mount Wundagore, the book passed through many hands before coming to Agatha Harkness, who used it to determine that Wanda Maximoff is the Scarlet Witch. After defeating Harkness, Maximoff takes the book to study it while in hiding, unaware of the book's evils, and becomes corrupted. After breaking out of the corruption, she destroys Wundagore and every copy of the Darkhold across the multiverse. The Book of Vishanti serves as the antithesis to the Darkhold. The Darkhold's appearance in WandaVision was pitched by co-executive producer Mary Livanos, who felt it would increase the level of danger posed by Harkness to Maximoff. A visually distinct iteration of the book appears in the ABC series Agents of S.H.I.E.L.D. and the Hulu series Runaways, in which it is used by Holden Radcliffe and Aida before Robbie Reyes takes to the Dark Dimension with Morgan le Fay later bringing it back to Earth. While this had not been discussed by the writers of WandaVision, director Matt Shakman stated that he believes they are the same book. The Darkhold was designed by the props team of Doctor Strange in the Multiverse of Madness for WandaVision, and visual effects were created by Luma Pictures.
- The Hood's cloak (based on the Marvel Comics object of the same name) is a hooded cloak belonging to Parker Robbins / The Hood that allows him to tap into dark arts and magic, though at the cost of slowly corrupting him. The cloak was given to Robbins by its original owner Mephisto after he made a deal with him. The cloak is later stolen from Robbins by Riri Williams / Ironheart, leaving him powerless.
- The Macchina di Kadavus, also known as The Box, is a relic owned and used by the Masters of the Mystic Arts to contain potentially hazardous spells. In 2024, it is used by Stephen Strange to contain the corrupted Runes of Kof-Kol, before it is destroyed by Norman Osborn with a pumpkin bomb, releasing the spell and creating rifts in the multiverse.
- The Sands of Nisanti are a mystical relic capable of suppressing the magical powers of sorcerers.
- Sling Rings are small two-ring mystical artifacts used by the Masters of the Mystic Arts to teleport between locations via an interdimensional portal. The sling ring is also worn and used by Ned Leeds and Cassandra Nova.
- The Staff of the Living Tribunal (based on the Marvel Comics entity of the same name) is a relic in the possession of the sorcerer Karl Mordo. It is capable of emitting a whip of energy that can be used in combat.
- The Vaulting Boots of Valtorr are a pair of mystically enhanced boots used by Karl Mordo to move freely through the air. They increase the wearer's jumping ability and neutralize the adverse effects of impacts from landings at great heights, as well as allowing the wearer to briefly walk on air.
- The Wand of Watoomb (based on the Marvel Comics object of the same name) is an artifact controlled by the thoughts of the wielder, and can be used to project and absorb mystical energy.

=== Infinity Stones ===
- The Mind Stone, originally housed in Loki's scepter and later on Vision's forehead, is the Infinity Stone that controlled the aspect of the mind. It grants the user the ability to control minds and give sentience to beings, as well as to project energy blasts. In 2015, Tony Stark and Bruce Banner use it to learn to create Ultron, who later fuses the Stone on Vision. Exposure to the Mind Stone also granted Pietro Maximoff superhuman speed and amplified Wanda's innate magical abilities. Her connection to the Stone also allows her to create a simulacrum of Vision and two sons, Billy and Tommy.
- The Power Stone, originally housed in the Orb and later in Ronan's Cosmi-Rod, is the Infinity Stone that controlled the aspect of power. It grants the user superhuman strength and durability, and is capable of overpowering Carol Danvers.
- The Reality Stone, originally in the form of the Aether (based on the classical element of the same name), was the Infinity Stone that controlled the aspect of reality. It first appears in a fluid-like state, and grants the user the ability to change reality, create illusions, suck the life force out of mortals, disrupt the laws of physics, and repel any threats that it detects.
- The Soul Stone, originally located on the planet Vormir, is the Infinity Stone that controlled the aspect of the soul. It grants the user the ability to manipulate living souls, and also contains a pocket dimension called the Soul World. Uniquely, it has a guard over its location, the Stonekeeper, who guides those through the ritual required to gain it: "a soul for a soul", via a sacrifice.
- The Space Stone, originally housed in the Tesseract (based on the Cosmic Cube from the Marvel Comics), is the Infinity Stone that controlled the aspect of space. It grants the user the ability to open wormholes and to travel between places instantaneously, and has been used by Johann Schmidt, Loki, and Thanos. The energy generated by the Stone is also used by the Asgardians to repair the Bifröst Bridge, Hydra and S.H.I.E.L.D. to power weapons, and Project Pegasus to develop light-speed engines.
- The Time Stone, originally housed in the Eye of Agamotto (based on the Marvel Comics object of the same name), is the Infinity Stone that controlled the aspect of time. It grants the user the ability to manipulate time and foresee possible futures. It has been used by Stephen Strange, the Ancient One, and Thanos.

=== Magic and spells ===
- Asgardian magic is a type of magic that is practiced by Asgardian sorcerers such as Loki, Frigga, Sylvie, Odin, Thor and Heimdall. This form of magic has many colors, with Loki's and Sylvie's magic being a bright green and Thor's being lightning based.
  - The Odinforce (based on the Marvel Comics energy of the same name) is a powerful mystical energy used by Odin in his capacity as King of Asgard. It is the source of power for his spear, Gungnir, also passed down through the Kings of Asgard, and is the power source and weapon of the Destroyer. It is periodically replenished by entering the Odinsleep, a state that leaves the user vulnerable. The parts of the disabled Destroyer are later assembled into a prototype gun.
- Chaos magic is an extremely powerful and rare form of magic that gives the user the ability to alter reality, wielded by Wanda Maximoff, thus making her the Scarlet Witch, a being once thought to be mythical. This form of magic's primary color is red mixed with white and black hues.
- Dark magic is a type of magic that harnesses energies from the Dark Dimension, practiced by Agatha Harkness, Morgan la Fey, Nico Minoru, Kaecilius and his Zealots, and the Ancient One. In the case of Nico and Kaecilius's group, the usage of this form of magic without protection is corrosive with the latter forming a direct link to Dormammu. Asgardians like Odin and Heimdall can use it. A darker version of Stephen Strange dubbed "Doctor Strange Supreme" also practices dark magic. This form of magic's color is either red or purple.
- Dreamwalking is a spell in the Darkhold that allows sorcerers to possess a variant of themselves in the multiverse.
- Eldritch magic, often referred to as the mystic arts, is a type of magic that is practiced by the Masters of the Mystic Arts on Earth (including Stephen Strange, Wong, Karl Mordo, Kaecilius, the Ancient One, and Jonathan Pangborn) as well as Krugarr. It is a light-based magic that produces sparks and fiery energy of a yellow or orange color that gives off light and warmth. Visual effects for various magical elements in Doctor Strange (including mandalas, runes, whips, stalks, lily pads, and portals) were provided by various VFX vendors, including Industrial Light & Magic (ILM), Method Studios, Framestore, Lola VFX, Luma Pictures, Rise FX, Crafty Apes, and SPOV.
- The Flames of Faltine are a spell controlled by high-level sorcerers that allows them to summon green flames that can be used in combat.
- The Vipers of Valtorr are a spell that allows the user to summon a group of snakes to attack opponents.

=== Artificial intelligences and robots ===
- Beerbot 5000 (voiced by Hamish Parkinson) is a Sakaaran robot programmed to work as a bartender.
- E.D.I.T.H. (voiced by Dawn Michelle King and portrayed by Emily Hampshire), which stands for Even Dead, I'm the Hero, is an advanced augmented reality artificial intelligence (AI) with numerous security, defense and tactical abilities created by Tony Stark and built into his pair of sunglasses. Following his death, the sunglasses are handed over to Peter Parker, giving him access to the AI as well as Stark Industries' large arsenal of missiles and weaponized drones.
- E.V. (voiced by Naomi Watts) is an AI created by Parker to serve as his assistant.
- F.R.I.D.A.Y. (voiced by Kerry Condon, portrayed by Orla Brady, and based on the Marvel Comics character of the same name), is a natural-language user interface created by Tony Stark to operate his armor, serving as a replacement for J.A.R.V.I.S. after it is seemingly destroyed by Ultron.
- Griot (voiced by Trevor Noah) is Shuri's artificial intelligence. The name "Griot" is a West African term for a historian or storyteller.
- The Hammer Drones were remotely-controlled humanoid drones designed by Ivan Vanko and commissioned by Justin Hammer following his previous failed attempts to recreate the Iron Man armor. They were designed for use by various branches of the military, with Hammer hoping that they would replace Iron Man. However, Vanko secretly takes control of the drones and used them to wreak havoc at the Stark Expo, though they are ultimately defeated by Tony Stark and James Rhodes and destroyed by Vanko.
- H.E.R.B.I.E. (voiced by Matthew Wood based on the Marvel Comics character of the same name), which stands for Humanoid Experimental Robot B-Type Integrated Electronics, is the Fantastic Four's robot companion who generally serves as Reed Richards's assistant.
- J.A.R.V.I.S. (voiced by Paul Bettany) is a complex artificial intelligence matrix created by Tony Stark and named after his father's butler, Edwin Jarvis. It is used by Stark to operate his technology, his mansion, Avengers Tower, and his company. While he is eventually destroyed by Ultron, his operational matrix is uploaded by Stark and Bruce Banner into a new body, becoming the Vision. According to the novelization of the first Iron Man film, the acronym stands for Just A Rather Very Intelligent System.
- Karen (voiced by Jennifer Connelly), initially called "Suit Lady", is the name given by Peter Parker for the natural-language user interface created by Tony Stark and embedded in his second Spider-Man suit. Originally hidden until Parker had completed the Training Wheels Protocol, Karen is unlocked by Ned Leeds after he hacks into the suit, and is destroyed along with the suit following an attack by Mysterio in Europe. Spider-Man: Homecoming co-writer Jonathan Goldstein was initially skeptical of the idea, feeling that it was too similar to J.A.R.V.I.S. and F.R.I.D.A.Y.
- K.E.V.I.N. (voiced by an uncredited Brian T. Delaney), which stands for Knowledge Enhanced Visual Interconnectivity Nexus, is an advanced artificial intelligence which in She-Hulk: Attorney at Law is revealed to be the mastermind behind all Marvel Cinematic Universe storyline decisions. She-Hulk had to go through Marvel Studios: Assembled on the Disney+ app to file a complaint to K.E.V.I.N. about the confusing storyline done in her show's final episode. It is depicted as operating through a hat-wearing robot in a secure room inside Marvel Studios where the entire Marvel Cinematic Universe can be surveyed simultaneously. Elements of the robot and A.I., including its name, call back to Marvel Studios President Kevin Feige, who helped the show's head writer Jessica Gao with the show's season finale.
- Mainframe (voiced by Miley Cyrus and then by Tara Strong and based on the Marvel Comics character of the same name), is an artificial intelligence and a leader of Mainframe Ravager Clan, as well as a member of Stakar Ogord's Team.
- Miss Minutes (voiced by Tara Strong in Loki and by Shelby Young in What If...? – An Immersive Story) is He Who Remains' creation. She assisted him in being the animated mascot of the Time Variance Authority (TVA) and takes the appearance of a female anthropomorphic clock with a southern accent. Her design was inspired by Felix the Cat as well as other cartoon characters from the early 20th century, with Loki season one director Kate Herron calling her a "Roger Rabbit kind of character". Her introductory informational video from the episode "Glorious Purpose" was inspired by Mr. DNA from Jurassic Park as well as public service announcements from various eras. Other animation inspirations include Magic Highway U.S.A., Your Safety First, Wonderful World of Disney, works by Ward Kimball and United Productions of America, as well as Duck Dodgers in the 24½th Century. Alternate designs for the character created during the production of Loki include one similar to Cogsworth from Beauty and the Beast. In the episode "For All Time. Always.", Miss Minutes reveals that she works for "He Who Remains" at the Citadel at the End of Time, with head writer Michael Waldron calling her transition to being evil "really scary". Upon the release of a poster featuring Miss Minutes in anticipation for the season, commentators believed that the character would be especially popular among viewers, drawing comparisons to Grogu. She made her comics debut on a variant cover in December 2021, and on-page in the limited series TVA in December 2024, following the MCU TVA interacting with several Marvel Comics realities after the events of Deadpool & Wolverine.
- The Sentinels (based on the Marvel Comics character of the same name) are large, man-made robots designed to hunt mutants.
- The Super-Adaptive Android (based on the Marvel Comics characters Super-Adaptoid and Awesome Android) is an android on Earth-828 created by René Rodin / Mad Thinker.
- The Time-Keepers (voiced by Jonathan Majors and based on the Marvel Comics characters of the same name) were three androids created by He Who Remains to pose as the creators of the Time Variance Authority (TVA). Believed to be alive by workers of the TVA, statues of them and their likenesses are featured in several locations throughout the TVA's headquarters. Majors voicing both the Time-Keepers and their controller He Who Remains is a reference to The Wizard of Oz (1939).
- The Ultron Sentries, also known as the Sub-Ultrons, are a large army of robots that acted as extensions of Ultron. They were created by Ultron using resources from the Hydra Research Base in Sokovia and were directly controlled by him, thus acting as his personal army. They were ultimately destroyed by the Avengers during the Battle of Sokovia.
- W.E.R.N.E.R. (voiced by Ross Marquand) is a natural-language user interface created by Tony Stark.

=== Elements ===
- Adamantium (based on the Marvel Comics element of the same name) is an incredibly strong metallic element found in Celestials and present as an alloy in Wolverine's skeleton, Deadpool's katanas, X-23's claws, Lady Deathstrike's nails, Sidewinder’s throwing knives and tomahawk, and Copperhead's knuckle daggers. It is more indestructible than vibranium.
- Uru (based on the Marvel Comics element of the same name) is a metal used by the Dwarves to forge the weapons Mjölnir and Stormbreaker, and the Infinity Gauntlet. It has magical properties. The metal is forged in the furnaces of Nidavellir as it is so powerful that only the heat of a dying star can melt it.
- Vibranium (based on the Marvel Comics element of the same name) is an element used to create Captain America's shield, the Black Panther suit, the Vision, Sam Wilson's Captain America suit and the Winter Soldier's cybernetic arm. It came from a meteorite collision with Earth and is regarded as the strongest metal in the world, stronger than steel and a third of the weight. The Wakandans originally hid it for years, and it thus became rare and extremely expensive, allowing vibranium smugglers such as Ulysses Klaue to make billions of dollars. Vibranium is also shown to be bulletproof to most high-caliber bullets. It is also absorbent of sound, vibration, and kinetic energy, and can deflect high-energy blasts. Its main source is Mount Bashenga in Wakanda, but it is eventually revealed at least a few other meteorites brought vibranium in small amounts to other parts of the world. However, when the Eternals prevented Tiamut the Communicator from being unleashed, this created the more indestructible element called adamantium.

=== Projects and initiatives ===
- The Avengers Initiative, originally known as the Protector Initiative, is the initiative for gathering a group of superheroes from various backgrounds, described as "a group of remarkable people", into the Avengers, to protect Earth from various threats. It was initiated by Nick Fury in the 1990s and was renamed in honor of Carol Danvers's call sign, "Avenger". In 2011, Fury directs Natasha Romanoff to measure Tony Stark's suitability for the initiative, though Stark was initially rejected and only used as a consultant. Fury also recruits Steve Rogers, Bruce Banner, and Thor, and also assigns S.H.I.E.L.D. agents Romanoff and Clint Barton to the team.
- Cataract is a project conducted by S.W.O.R.D. with the goal of reactivating the Vision as a "sentient weapon" following his death at the hands of Thanos during the Infinity War. Under Acting Director Tyler Hayward's orders, S.W.O.R.D. acquires Vision's body following the Battle of Wakanda and dismantles it, hoping to study its components and rebuild it. Though initially unsuccessful, S.W.O.R.D. uses energy collected from Wanda Maximoff on a Stark Industries drone to reactivate Vision, turning his body white in the process.
- The Doorman Clause, named after DeMarr Davis / Doorman, is a ban that prohibits individuals with superpowers from acting in films and television, requiring actors to sign affidavits confirming that they do not possess any superhuman powers.
- Project Insight is a secret S.H.I.E.L.D. operation that was begun as a direct response to the Battle of New York. It involved three advanced Helicarriers that would patrol Earth, using an algorithm to evaluated people's behavior to detect possible future threats and using satellite-guided guns to eliminate those individuals. The project was led by Alexander Pierce, who intended to use the project as a means of eliminating individuals who posed a threat to Hydra. Notable targeted figures included Tony Stark, Bruce Banner, and Stephen Strange. His plans were eventually foiled by Steve Rogers and his allies. Captain America: The Winter Soldier directors Anthony and Joe Russo sought to include references to drone warfare, targeted killing and global surveillance in the film, which became more topical during principal photography due to the disclosure of several National Security Agency surveillance-related documents.
- Project Pegasus (based on the Marvel Comics project of the same name) is a joint project between S.H.I.E.L.D., NASA, and the United States Air Force to study the Tesseract. It is reactivated by the World Security Council following an alien attack in Puente Antiguo, New Mexico until it is terminated after Thor takes the Tesseract back to Asgard after the Battle of New York.
- Project Rebirth (based on Weapon I from the Marvel Comics), also known as the Super Soldier Program, is a collaboration between U.S., British and German scientists led by Dr. Abraham Erskine under the supervision of Peggy Carter, Howard Stark, and Chester Phillips to create a new breed of super-soldiers. The first successful test leads to the creation of Captain America by enhancing the sickly Steve Rogers, but is abandoned following the assassination of Erskine by Heinz Kruger.
- The Red Room (based on the Marvel Comics program of the same name), also known as the Black Widow Program, is a top-secret Soviet (and later Russian) training program led by Dreykov. The program takes young orphan girls and turns them into elite assassins named "Black Widows", and is overseen by various individuals, including Madame B. and Melina Vostokoff. Taskmaster is another head agent working directly for Dreykov. Graduates of the program include Natasha Romanoff, Yelena Belova and Ruth Bat-Seraph. The program was terminated in 2016 following the destruction of the Red Room's headquarters. In an alternate universe seen in What If...?, the Red Room captures Steve Rogers in 1953 and brainwashes him into being an assassin rather than Hydra brainwashing Bucky Barnes. During a final confrontation between the brainwashed Rogers, the Black Widows, led by Vostokoff, and Romanoff and Captain Carter, Carter manages to break through to Rogers who destroys the Red Room's headquarters, seemingly at the cost of his own life.
- The Safer Streets Initiative is an initiative developed by New York City Mayor Wilson Fisk to outlaw vigilante activities in the city, leading him to declare a citywide curfew and martial law.
- The Sokovia Accords (based on the Registration Acts from the Marvel Comics), officially titled the Sokovia Accords: Framework for the Registration and Deployment of Enhanced Individuals, were a group of legislative documents ratified by the United Nations (UN), with the support of 117 countries, following the Battle of Sokovia. They establish UN oversight over the Avengers, and were supported by Tony Stark, James Rhodes, Vision, T'Challa, and Natasha Romanoff and opposed by Steve Rogers, Sam Wilson, and Clint Barton, leading to the Avengers Civil War. By the events of She-Hulk: Attorney at Law, the Accords were repealed and no longer active.
- The Ultron Program is an attempt by Tony Stark and Bruce Banner to create an artificial intelligence, "Ultron", as a means of protecting the world against incoming extraterrestrial threats. The program becomes a failure, with the program being infected due to the Mind Stone and turning genocidal, seeking to wipe out the human race.
- The Winter Soldier Program is a top secret Hydra super-soldier program started by Nazi scientist Dr. Arnim Zola in the 1940s. It took soldiers, brainwashed them, and enhanced them with a recreation of the Super Soldier Serum, turning them into deadly assassins known as "Winter Soldiers", who were kept in cryostasis while not on a mission. Each soldier had a set of codewords, recorded in the Winter Soldier Book, which, when recited to a Winter Soldier, would make them completely obedient to that person. The Winter Soldiers, with the exception of Bucky Barnes, are later executed by Helmut Zemo.

=== Terms and phrases ===
- An "absolute point" is a crucial and immutable event in a timeline, the alteration of which could lead to the end of that timeline. An "absolute point" is different from a Nexus Event, which creates a new, branching timeline.
- An "anchor being" is an individual whose existence is vital to the stability of their universe. Once this individual is killed or removed, their reality begins to gradually degrade until it is destroyed.
- "Avengers, assemble!" is a rallying cry for the Avengers.
- "Avocados at Law" is a running gag in Daredevil and Daredevil: Born Again.
- "Ding dong!" is the catchphrase of DeMarr Davis / Doorman.
- "Enhanced" is a term used to refer to anyone with paranormal abilities or generally extraordinary attributes, regardless of origin or if they are considered legitimate superpowers.
- "Flame On!" and "Flame Off!" are the commands Johnny Storm / Human Torch uses to respectively activate and deactivate his pyrokinetic powers.
- "I am Iron Man" is the catchphrase of Tony Stark / Iron Man.
- "I could do this all day" is the catchphrase of Steve Rogers / Captain America. The Captain Carter of Earth-838 also utters the line in Doctor Strange in the Multiverse of Madness.
- "Imperius Rex!" is Namor's battle cry.
- An "incursion" is a universe-ending event that occurs when the barriers between two universes erode and they collide, resulting in the destruction of one or both of the universes in the process. This catastrophic event usually results from multiversal travel or tampering.
- "I see a suit of armor around the world" is a quote from Tony Stark.
- "It's Clobberin' Time!" is the battle cry of Ben Grimm / The Thing.
- "¡Líik'ik Talokan!" is a rallying cry for the Talokanil.
- A "Nexus Event" is a significant moment where a person deviates from their predetermined path on the Sacred Timeline, creating a new, branching timeline.
- "On your left" is a quote from Steve Rogers that was later adopted as a catchphrase by Sam Wilson.
- The "Peter Tingle" (based on the Spider-Sense from the Marvel Comics) is the name given by May Parker to her nephew Peter's precognition ability.
- "Pruning" is the Time Variance Authority's (TVA) method of erasing branched timelines, objects, or variants deemed a threat to the Sacred Timeline. Using reset charges or time sticks, pruned targets are not destroyed but sent to the Void, where they are to be consumed by Alioth.
- "Thwip" is the onomatopoeia representing the sound of Spider-Man's web-shooters firing webs.
- "Time slipping" is a phenomenon in which an individual is pulled through different points in time and space.
- A "universe-killer" is a being powerful enough to be able to destroy their own universe.
- A "variant" is an individual who has deviated from the Sacred Timeline.
- "Wakanda Forever" is a slogan widely used by Wakandans.
- "With great power, there must also come great responsibility" is a line spoken to Peter Parker by his aunt May before her death at the hands of Norman Osborn.
- "You will never see me coming" is a quote from Trevor Slattery.

=== Substances ===
- The Black Widow antidote is a red-colored synthetic gas stored in vials which acts as the antidote to the chemical mind-control that the Red Room employs on its Black Widows and Taskmaster, created by a rogue former Black Widow. Yelena Belova and Natasha Romanoff acquire the antidote in 2016 and use it to free various Widows.
- Diox-3 (based on the Marvel Comics object of the same name) is an experimental substance created by Otto Octavius in an alternate universe. It was claimed by Oscorp, along with other creations of Octavius, after his arrest. However, while the chemical was being transported in a truck, Lonnie Lincoln was exposed to it when the 110th Street gang attempted to hijack the vehicle, granting him superhuman strength and virtually indestructible skin.
- The Harvest is a collection of various DNA samples from enhanced humans and alien beings, gathered by the Skrulls at the behest of Nick Fury. The Harvest contains DNA samples from Abomination, Black Panther, Captain America, Captain Marvel, Chitauri, Cull Obsidian, Drax, Flora colossus (Groot), Frost Beast, Gamora, Ghost, Corvus Glaive, Hulk, Korg, Mantis, Ebony Maw, Proxima Midnight, Outrider, Thanos, Thor Odinson, Valkyrie, and Winter Soldier.
- The Heart-shaped herb is a Wakandan plant enriched through exposure to vibranium, giving it a glowing purple color. It is ingested in a ceremony by the new Black Panther, granting them superhuman abilities. It also allows for the communication with the dead in the Ancestral Plane upon ingestion. After becoming King of Wakanda, N'Jadaka ingests the herb and orders the rest of the stocks to be incinerated. One of them is extracted by Nakia, who uses it to heal T'Challa. Shuri later attempts to develop a synthetic Heart-shaped herb, eventually succeeding and allowing her to receive the same enhancements that N'Jadaka and T'Challa had acquired.
- Pym Particles (based on the Marvel Comics object of the same name) are extradimensional subatomic particles capable of reducing or increasing the distance between atoms, allowing the user to shrink or grow. The formula for the particles was created by Hank Pym and they appear in the form of a liquid stored in vials. They appear red when used to shrink and blue when used to grow. The particles also power Pym Discs and the Wasp's blasters, and are used by the Avengers to time-travel via the Quantum Realm during the Time Heist.
- The Super Soldier Serum (based on the Marvel Comics object of the same name) is a serum used to enhance humans to the peak of human perfection. It was originally developed by Dr. Abraham Erskine and was given to Johann Schmidt (turning him into the Red Skull) and Steve Rogers (turning him into Captain America). After Erksine's death, numerous other versions of the serum are created with varying degrees of success. Hydra used a version of the serum to transform Bucky Barnes into the Winter Soldier, and later used variants of the serum taken from Howard Stark after his assassination to enhance other assassins as well, but the program fails and is shut down. Another serum was given to Isaiah Bradley by the U.S. government during the Cold War, allowing him to confront and defeat the Winter Soldier in combat. Bruce Banner tried to replicate the serum using gamma radiation as a substitute for vita radiation, turning him into the Hulk. Meanwhile, a more successful version of the serum was given to Emil Blonsky by the U.S. government, and Dr. Wilfred Nagel replicated the serum and gave them to the Power Broker until they were stolen by Karli Morgenthau and the Flag Smashers. Helmut Zemo later destroys all but one of the vials, which is taken by John Walker.

=== Technologies ===
- The Arc reactor is an energy source originally designed by Howard Stark and Anton Vanko, and later independently built by their sons, Tony and Ivan. It was initially designed as part of an attempt to replicate the Tesseract's energy based on Howard's study of the object. Tony Stark eventually builds two versions—a large industrial reactor for powering his machines at the Stark Industries Headquarters, and a miniature version embedded in his chest to power his armor (also known as an RT) and prevent the shrapnel from reaching his heart. The first miniature version used a palladium core, although he later synthesizes a new element when the palladium begins to poison him. He continues to develop the reactor throughout the years (even after the shrapnel is removed from his body), with the final version containing nanobots that make up his armor. Ivan Vanko, James Rhodes, and Pepper Potts also use arc reactors in their armors. Max Dillon from an alternate universe also briefly uses one before it is removed by Otto Octavius, also from an alternate universe and takes it back with him to his reality.
- B.A.R.F., which stands for Binarily Augmented Retro-Framing, is a holographic technology created by Quentin Beck during his time at Stark Industries. Despite the technology's potential, Stark used the technology for therapeutic purposes and gave it a deliberately humorous name, humiliating and disgusting Beck. After he is fired for his unstable nature, Beck further developed the technology and equipped drones with advanced holographic projectors to create large monsters known as Elementals.
- Doctor Octopus's tentacles are a set of four artificially intelligent, tentacle-like mechanical arms created by Otto Octavius / Doctor Octopus and attached to his back. They serve both to assist him in his laboratory experiments and for combat.
- Dum-E is Tony Stark's automated hydraulic arm. Built by a young Stark in his father Howard's garage, it acts as his workshop assistant, and often "hands" him things, such as bringing his arc reactor when Stark was unable to reach it due to having his previous one stolen by Obadiah Stane. However, Dum-E has also often been of annoyance to Stark. In 2013, it is severely damaged by Aldrich Killian's attack on his mansion and later pulled out of the wreckage and hauled away by Stark. By 2024, it has been fully repaired and moved into Happy Hogan's apartment.
- Kimoyo Beads are an advanced piece of technology developed by Shuri and used in Wakanda. They are made to serve a vast range of purposes according to the needs of the wearer, such as deprogramming Bucky Barnes.

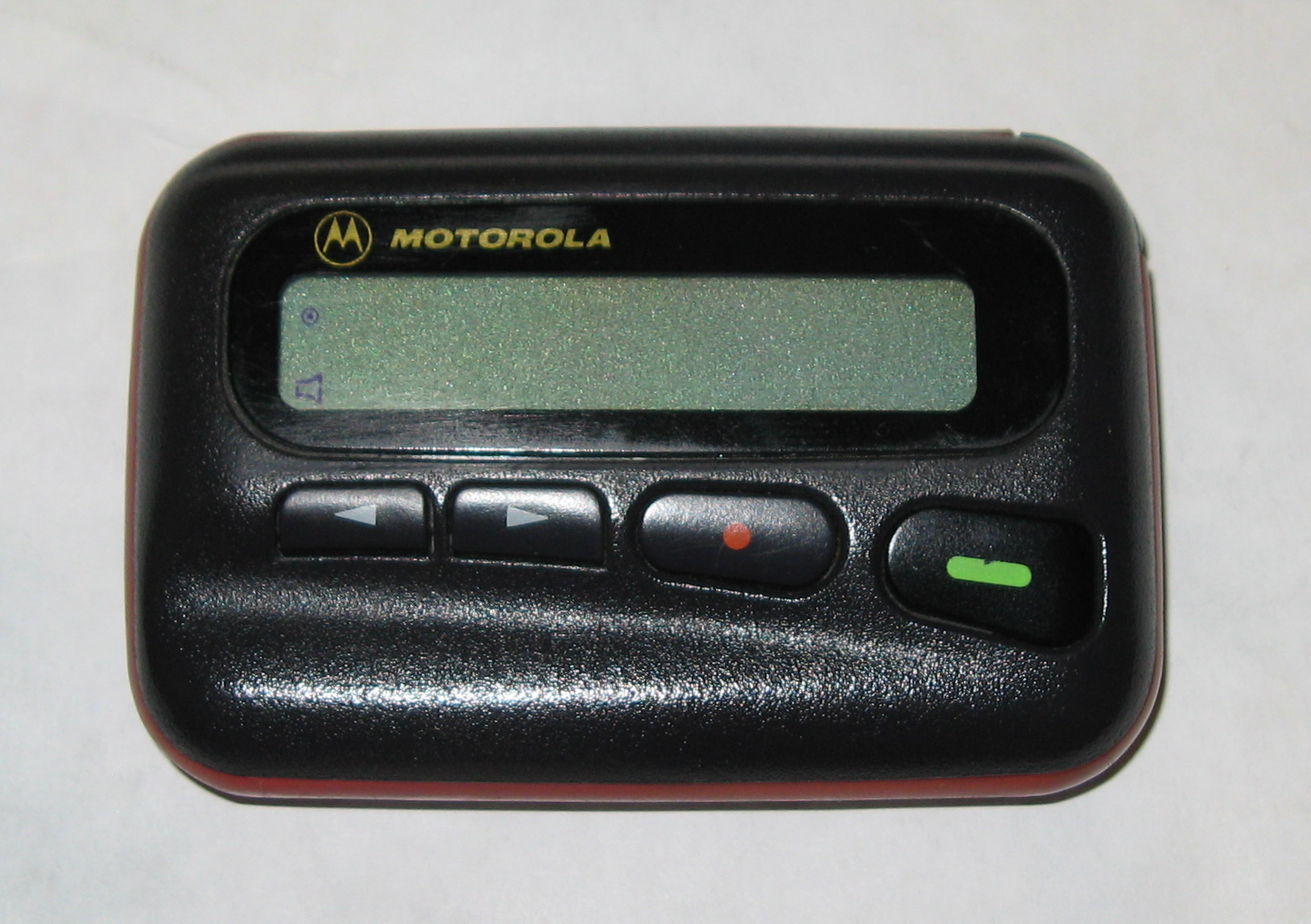
A Motorola LX2 pager

- Nick Fury's pager is a pager belonging to Nick Fury that was upgraded by Carol Danvers before she left Earth. With the new enhancements, it could now contact her no matter where she was in the galaxy, although he was only to use it in the event of an emergency. Nick Fury activates it for the first time in years during the Blip, prompting Danvers to return to Earth and meet the surviving Avengers.
- Peter Quill's Walkman is a Sony TPS-L2 Walkman given to Peter Quill by his mother, Meredith, when he was a child. It contained a cassette tape titled Awesome Mix Vol. 1 which included a series of songs from the 1960s and 1970s, incorporated by Guardians of the Galaxy director James Gunn as "cultural reference points" to remind audiences of Quill's Earthly origins. Deeply cherished by Quill, he happened to have his Walkman on him when abducted by Yondu, which he continued to listen to during his adult years. Following the Battle of Xandar, Quill opens a gift from his mother, which is revealed to be another mixtape titled Awesome Mix Vol. 2, described by Gunn as "better" and "more diverse" than Vol. 1. After his Walkman is destroyed by Ego, Kraglin gives him a Zune formerly owned by Yondu as a replacement, a scene which Microsoft was displeased with.
- The Quantum Tunnel is an inter-dimensional gateway designed by Hank Pym, Bill Foster, and Elihas Starr to transport individuals to and from the Quantum Realm. Six versions of the tunnel have been created over time: the first incarnation was built by Pym, Foster, and Starr but was destroyed in an explosion; a second version of the tunnel was used by Pym and Hope van Dyne to rescue Janet van Dyne from the Quantum Realm; a third version was placed inside Luis's van and used to send Scott Lang into the Quantum Realm to acquire quantum energy to heal Ava Starr; a fourth tunnel designed by Tony Stark, Bruce Banner, and Rocket was used by the Avengers to travel back in time to collect the six Infinity Stones in alternate timelines; a fifth was created shortly after the Battle of Earth by Banner to send Steve Rogers back in time to return the Infinity Stones and Mjölnir back to their respective timelines; and a sixth tunnel was used by Leo Fitz, Jemma Simmons, and Enoch to travel across different timelines.

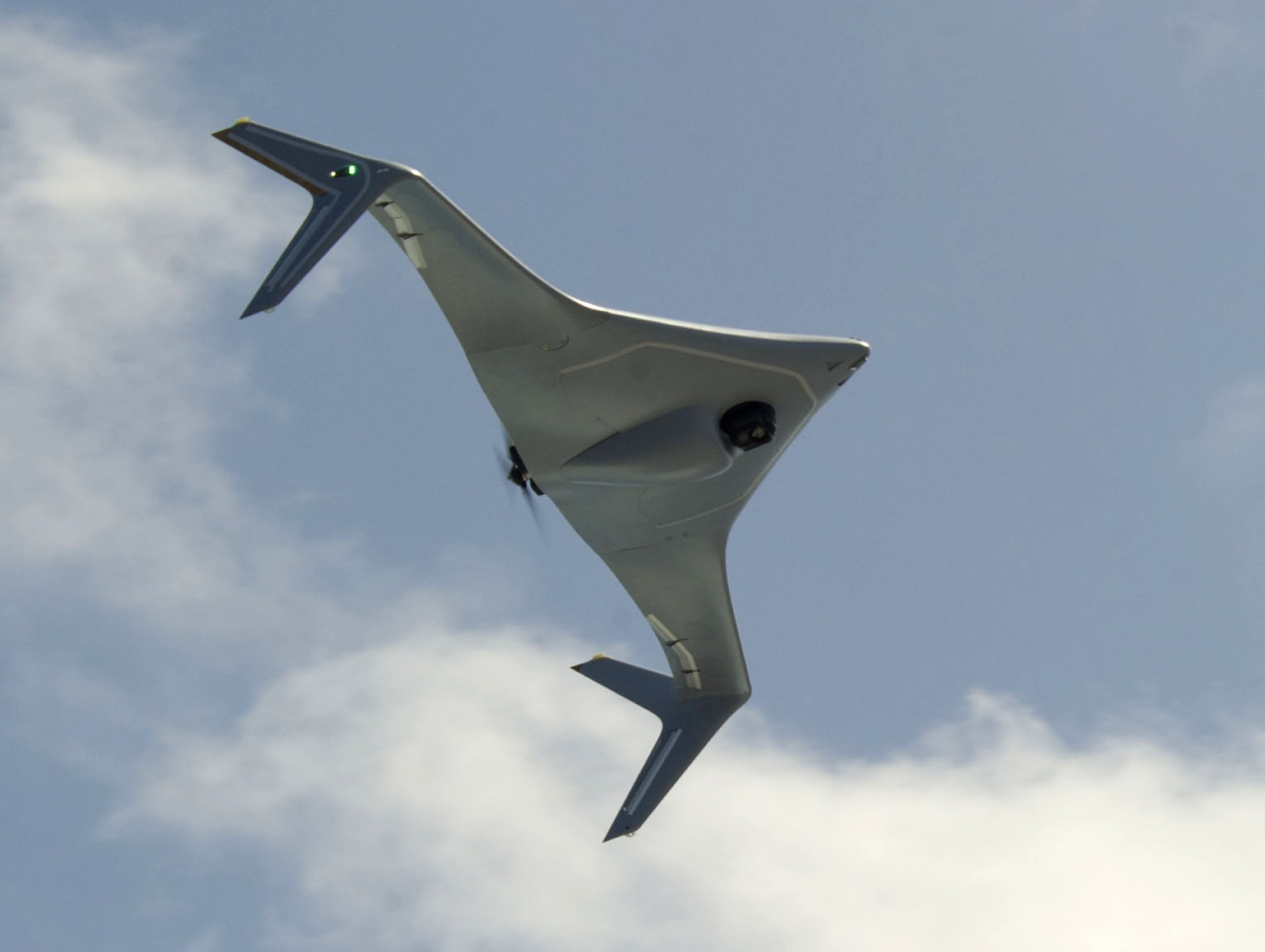
The Northrop Grumman Bat, a typical weaponized reconnaissance drone

- Redwing (based on the Marvel Comics animal of the same name), officially designated the Stark Drone MK82 922 V 80Z V2 Prototype Unit V6, is an advanced drone used in combat and reconnaissance by Sam Wilson. It was originally designed by Stark Industries after Wilson joins the Avengers, and was equipped into his EXO-7 Falcon suit. In 2023, Wilson acquires a new version of the drone along with a new combat suit, but the drone is destroyed by Karli Morgenthau. Wilson later uses a new version of the drone along with his uniform as Captain America, both designed in Wakanda.
- The Regeneration Cradle is a piece of medical equipment created by Dr. Helen Cho that is able to heal serious injuries by grafting artificial tissue onto them. Clint Barton's life is saved through this treatment. Ultron later brainwashes Dr. Cho using Loki's scepter into grafting the tissue to the Mind Stone and vibranium to create a new body for himself. The Avengers intervene, and with Thor's help, the new body is awoken and dubbed the "Vision".
- TemPads are devices used by the Time Variance Authority (TVA) to travel through time. Their interface was inspired by SNES video games and Game Boys, with Loki director Kate Herron describing them as "the closest thing to our phones" that the TVA has. The TemPads create Time Doors, amber-colored interdimensional portals used by the TVA to travel between alternate timelines to preserve the Sacred Timeline. They can also lead to Time Cells, where prisoners are forever stuck in time loops and the Doors are colored red. FuseFX, which provided the portals' visual effects for the first season of Loki, explained that this color change was to reflect the amount of suffering which Loki undergoes when inside the Time Cells.
- Thor's prosthetic eye is a bionic eye that he wears in his left eye socket, replacing the organic one gouged out by Hela. He is given it by Rocket, who stole it from one of Yondu's Ravagers, Vorker, who takes the eye out when he sleeps. Rocket stored it in his rectum until giving it to Thor. The eye has a brown iris, in contrast to Thor's natural blue eyes.
- Tony Stark's glasses are a pair of technologically advanced sunglasses created by him. They are able to polarize and contain his AI F.R.I.D.A.Y. After his death, F.R.I.D.A.Y. is replaced by E.D.I.T.H., passing into the hands of Peter Parker. Parker passes them on to Quentin Beck, who uses them to better control his illusions, before reacquiring them in London.
- The Universal Neural Teleportation Network is the universal system for space travel. The system enables spaceships to travel through hexagonal-shaped wormholes known as jump points to instantaneously travel between planetary systems. In Guardians of the Galaxy Vol. 2, Yondu says it is not healthy for a mammalian lifeform to go through more than fifty jumps at once, which will result in extreme discomfort and temporary disfigurement for those on board. By 2024, a S.A.B.E.R. space station has been established outside Earth, near a jump point.
- A Widow's Veil, also known as a nano mask is a device used by S.H.I.E.L.D. agents to impersonate others. Designed by a University of California, Berkeley graduate named Selwyn, the mask is capable of imitating one's appearance and voice to create a disguise. It has been used by Natasha Romanoff, Sunil Bakshi, Kara Palamas, Melina Vostokoff, Sharon Carter, and Nick Fury.

=== Media ===
- Cosmic Queen is a film directed by Howard Stark and starring Agatha Harkness and Kingo, set in an alternate universe during the Golden Age of Hollywood.
- Fantastic Science with Mister Fantastic is a children's science show on Earth-828 hosted by Reed Richards.
- Finding Wakanda is a documentary about the country of the same name. By 2024, the documentary was available as in-flight entertainment (IFE).
- Heart of Iron: The Tony Stark Story is a documentary that focuses on the life and legacy of Tony Stark / Iron Man. By 2024, the documentary was available as IFE.
- Hunting Hydra is a documentary about the organization of the same name. By 2024, the documentary was available as IFE.
- Nova: Einstein Rosen Bridges with Dr. Erik Selvig is a documentary in which astrophysicist Erik Selvig explains what wormholes (Einstein-Rosen bridges) are. By 2024, the documentary was available as IFE.
- Phone Ranger (based on the Marvel Comics character of the same name) is a film released in 1977.
- Rogers: The Musical is a Broadway musical centered on the life of Steve Rogers. In addition to the titular character, Tony Stark, Thor, Bruce Banner, Natasha Romanoff, Clint Barton, Loki, and Lang also appear. A musical number from the musical titled "Save the City" which focuses on the Battle of New York was written by Marc Shaiman and Scott Wittman and released as a single on November 24, 2021. The song was performed live at Marvel Studios' D23 Expo panel on September 10, 2022, while a one-act version of Rogers: The Musical will premiere at the Hyperion Theater at Disney California Adventure in mid-2023 for a limited time.
- The BB Report is an online news segment hosted by journalist BB Urich, featuring interviews with ordinary people, commentary, and investigative reports that reflect the real-life concerns of New Yorkers.
- The Fantastic Four: Power Hour is an animated television series set on Earth-828, based on the superhero team of the same name.
- The Snap is a documentary about the event of the same name. By 2024, the documentary was available as IFE.
- The Ted Gilbert Show is a popular talk show on Earth-828 hosted by Ted Gilbert.
- WandaVision is a sitcom broadcast by Wanda Maximoff in the Westview anomaly using her Chaos Magic abilities. Set in the town of Westview, New Jersey, the sitcom centered on Wanda Maximoff's family, which included the Vision, Billy Maximoff, and Tommy Maximoff. It also "starred" Agatha Harkness as Agnes, Ralph Bohner as Pietro Maximoff, Monica Rambeau as Geraldine, Todd and Sharon Davis as Arthur and Mrs. Hart, Abilash Tandon as Norm, Harold and Sarah Proctor as Phil and Dottie Jones, John Collins as Herb, Isabel Matsueda as Beverly, an unknown actor as Dennis, and Darcy Lewis as an unnamed character. The show was ultimately "canceled" by Wanda (as described by Tyler Hayward) after her actions were discovered by Vision and S.W.O.R.D. and she expanded the Hex to save Vision's "life".
- Wonder Man is a 1980 superhero film. In the 2020s, a remake was produced by director Von Kovak, with Simon Williams in the title role.
- Zaniac! (based on the Marvel Comics character of the same name) is a horror film released in 1977 and starring Hunter X-5 under the name "Brad Wolfe". The film inspired the creation of an arcade game with the same name.

=== Books ===
- Live Without Fear is a self-help book written by therapist Heather Glenn.
- Look Out for the Little Guy is a memoir written by Scott Lang sometime after the Blip, chronicling his adventures as an Avenger. Lang spends much of his time post-Blip conducting book signings, which infuriates his daughter Cassie. As part of a viral marketing campaign in promotion for Ant-Man and the Wasp: Quantumania, Hyperion Avenue announced it would publish a real-life version of Look Out for the Little Guy in September 2023, featuring "over 20 short pieces exploring different aspects of [Lang]'s experiences" as a father and Avenger. That book was written by author Rob Kutner and Quantumania screenwriter Jeff Loveness.
- Steve Rogers's notebook is a small notebook originally belonging to Steve Rogers which he used to keep a list of notable items, people, events, and pop culture elements which he missed during his time in suspended animation. The things noted on the list vary by the region where Captain America: The Winter Soldier was released. Later, the notebook was passed on to Rogers's best friend, Bucky Barnes, who used it to keep a list of people whom he had wronged during his time as the Winter Soldier. Eventually, after Barnes finishes making amends with everyone on the list, he leaves the notebook with his therapist, Dr. Christina Raynor, thanking her for her help.
- The Winter Soldier Book is a book formerly used by Hydra which contained Russian trigger words that would activate their Winter Soldiers into deadly assassins when spoken. It was later discovered by Helmut Zemo and used to activate Barnes into the Winter Soldier, using the words from the book: "Longing, rusted, seventeen, daybreak, furnace, nine, benign, homecoming, one, freight car". (Note: Russian: Желание, ржавый, семнадцать, рассвет, печь, девять, добросердечный, возвращение на родину, один, товарный вагон) The trigger words' effect is eventually nullified after Barnes is healed in Wakanda.

=== Others ===
- The New Jersey AvengerCon, or simply AvengerCon, is a fan convention celebrating the Avengers, located at the newly rebuilt Camp Lehigh. Ms. Marvel co-director Adil El Arbi described the set as an "Easter egg paradise", featuring many references to other MCU media. The song "Star Spangled Man" from Captain America: The First Avenger is played in the background during the first episode's AvengerCon sequence. An early version of that episode featured even more characters, including cosplayers dressed as Korg and Valkyrie. Marvel Studios president Kevin Feige has expressed interest in a real-life AvengerCon, revealing that the crew behind Spider-Man: No Way Home "kept sneaking over" to the AvengerCon set during the production of Ms. Marvel, and added that filming during the COVID-19 pandemic was "cathartic" because real-life comic conventions had been suspended. Shortly after the release of the second episode, a viral marketing website for AvengerCon was published by Disney+.

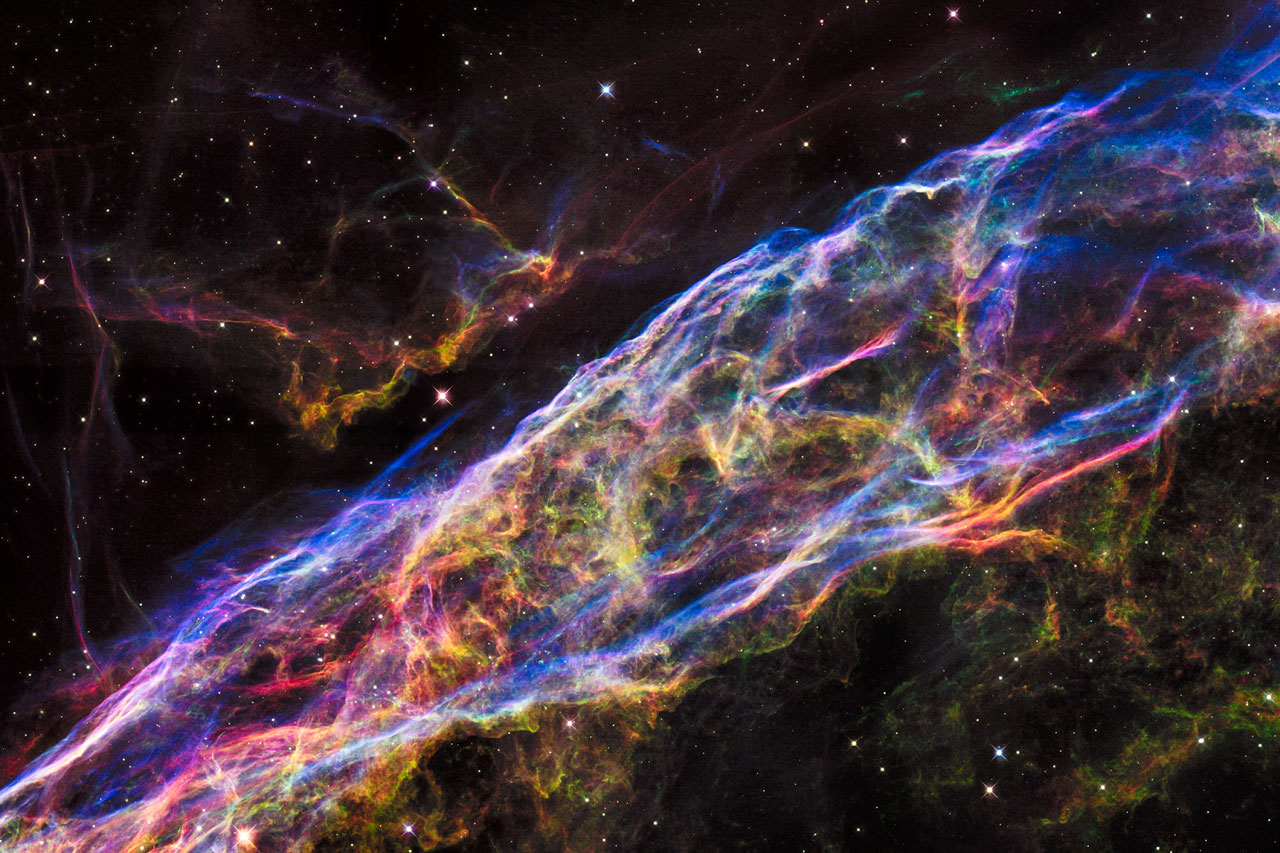
Hubble photography inspired the visual effects of the Bifrost.

- The Bifröst Bridge (based on the Norse mythological location of the same name), often simply referred to as the Bifröst, is an energy that allows for near-instantaneous travel via a wormhole, used primarily for travel within the Nine Realms by Asgardians. The energy is harnessed using the Rainbow Bridge, which connected to Himinbjörg. Loki intends to use this to destroy Jotunheim, proving himself worthy of the throne to Odin, but his plans are foiled after Thor destroys the Rainbow Bridge. The Bridge is later repaired using the Tesseract, but destroyed again during Ragnarok. The energy can also be generated through dark magic and using Stormbreaker. Visual effects of the Bifröst in Thor were influenced by Hubble photography as well as other images of deep space, and were done by BUF Compagnie and Fuel VFX.
- The Captain America PSAs are a series of public service announcements starring Captain America dressed in his 2012 suit. The President's Challenge served as an inspiration for one of the videos centered on "Captain America's Fitness Challenge", with Spider-Man: Homecoming director Jon Watts believing that Captain America would be the obvious version of that in the MCU. Another PSA discussed school detention and puberty, which became an internet meme following the release of Homecoming. A post-credits scene of that film features a third PSA video of Rogers lecturing the audience on the value of patience, a meta-reference to the fact that the film's audience had waited through the film's credits just to see that scene and a "last-minute addition" to the film. Five additional PSAs featuring Avengers were conceived but ultimately unrealized.
- The Contest of Champions (based on the Marvel Comics storyline of the same name) is a gladiator tournament held on Sakaar by the Grandmaster. His tower displays models of the heads of past champions, which resemble Man-Thing, Ares, Bi-Beast, Dark-Crawler, Fin Fang Foom, and Beta Ray Bill from the comics in addition to the Hulk. Other gladiators include Thor, Korg, and Miek. Loki lands on the planet as well but is able to ingratiate himself with the Grandmaster and watches the games from his private box. When designing the gladiator arena on Sakaar for Thor: Ragnarok, production designer Dan Hennah studied Roman gladiators and decided to go "all alien with it", surrounding the arena with "standing up bleachers".
- The Elementals (based on the Marvel Comics team of the same name) are a series of illusions created by the use of projectors and drones used by Quentin Beck / Mysterio to wreak havoc across the world. To mask their nature, Beck claimed that the Elementals were superpowered entities from Earth-833 that emerged from an inter-dimensional rift caused by the Snap. This iteration consists of the Wind, Earth, Fire, and Water Elementals; who are modeled after Cyclone, Sandman, Molten Man, and Hydro-Man respectively. Quentin Beck, operating under the guise of Mysterio, claimed that they were born in a black hole and ravaged his reality of Earth-833. After Mysterio defeats the Wind and Earth Elementals off-screen, he goes on to fight the Water Elemental in Venice while Nick Fury and Maria Hill persuade Spider-Man to help Mysterio defeat the Fire Elemental in Prague. After finding a holographic projector, Peter Parker and MJ learn the truth and are hunted down by Beck and his accomplices, who create an Elemental fusion monster to distract the world while he sets out to kill them. His plans are foiled when Spider-Man deactivates the drones.
- The Emergence is an apocalyptic event that results in a new Celestial being born after being incubated in a planet's core for millennia while the planet's native population flourishes on the surface. Once a planet's population reaches a suitable amount, the Celestial bursts through the planet's mantle and crust, destroying its egg along with its inhabitants to propagate life elsewhere in the Universe. A group of ten Eternals are sent by the Celestial Arishem to Earth to eradicate the invasive Deviants and ensure the continual growth and advancement of Earth's population, but they instead develop a love for humanity and prevent the Emergence of the Celestial Tiamut after the Blip temporarily delays the event.
- The Forge is a contraption built by Doctor Strange Supreme to resurrect his dead universe. He attempts to feed universe-killers to the Forge in an attempt to activate it, but is thwarted by Captain Carter and Kahhori. Afterwards, Strange willingly sacrifices himself to the Forge, successfully restoring his universe, though at the cost of never having been born into it.

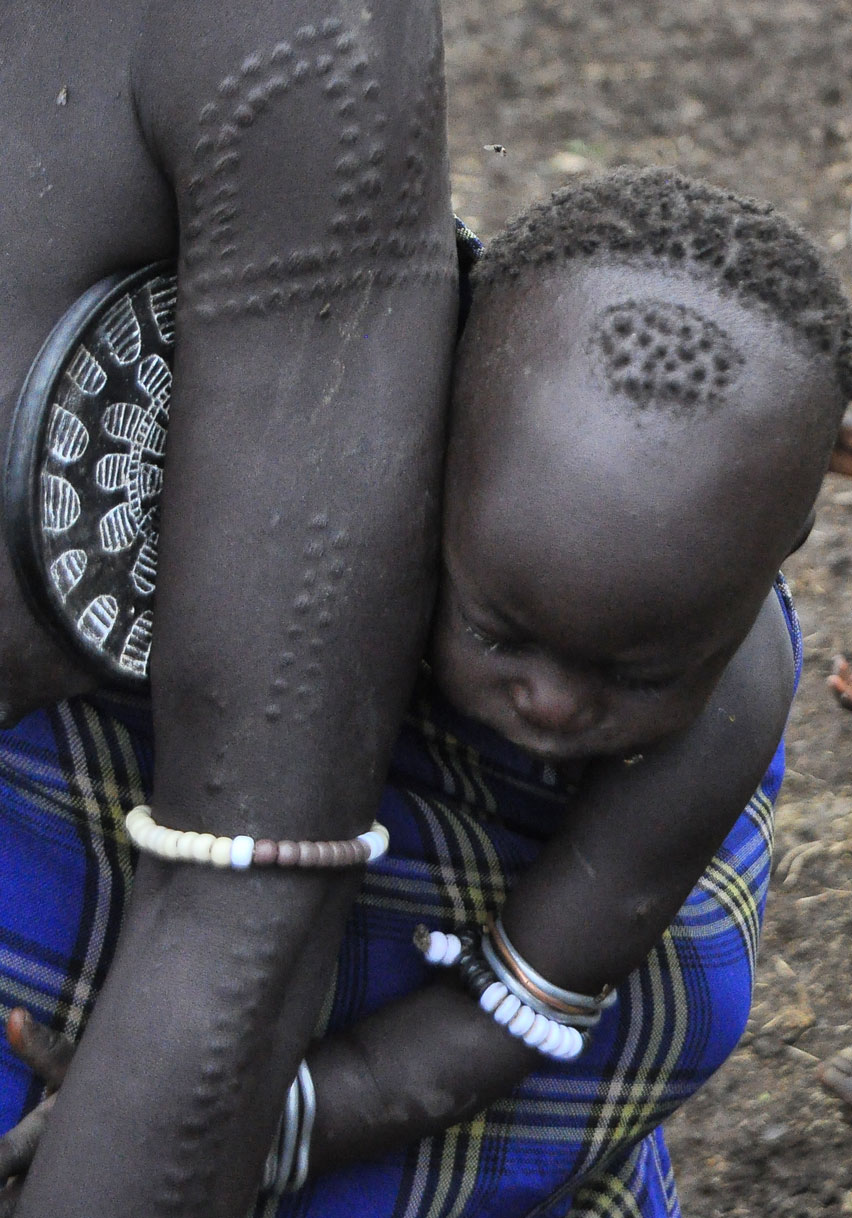
Surma person with arm scarification

- Killmonger's scars are a series of around 3000 self-inflicted "crocodile scars" covering Erik "Killmonger" Stevens' body. Each one represents a confirmed kill from his time as an American black ops Navy SEAL. The scars are intended to resemble the scar tattoos of the Mursi and Surma tribes, and consisted of 90 individually sculpted silicone molds that took two-and-a-half hours to apply. Michael B. Jordan, who portrays Killmonger, had to sit in a sauna for two hours at the end of the day to remove the prosthetics when filming Black Panther.
- Loki's horned helmet is a golden horned helmet worn by Loki as well as his variants, including Sylvie, Classic Loki, Kid Loki, President Loki, and Alligator Loki. The helmet is a symbol of Asgardian royalty and also bears Satanic imagery, symbolizing the devil, according to Loki actor Tom Hiddleston.
- Mahd Wy'ry is a psychotic episode which affects Thena, causing her to seemingly lose control and attack her teammates. Mistakenly believed by the Eternals to be a form of dementia affecting her perception of time due to her enormous amount of memory, Gilgamesh volunteers to be her guardian and lives off-the-grid with her in Australia for hundreds of years. The Eternals eventually learn that the condition is actually a result of Thena recalling memories from her past missions, which had supposedly been erased from their minds by Arishem. Thena actress Angelina Jolie and her Eternals co-star Salma Hayek found this element of the story moving, comparing the condition to women suffering from mental illnesses.
- Sloth Baby Productions is a YouTube channel owned and operated by Kamala Khan / Ms. Marvel.
- Thor's winged helmet is a helmet occasionally worn by Thor.
- The Uni-Mind (based on the Marvel Comics entity of the same name) is a connection between all the Eternals that can amplify the powers of one of them.

== Major events ==
=== Pre–21st century ===
- The Kree–Skrull War (995 AD–present) (based on the Marvel Comics storyline of the same name) is an ongoing thousand-year-long conflict between the Kree and Skrulls, with the Kree striving to wipe out the entire Skrull race. In the 20th Century, the Kree scientist Mar-Vell rebels and travels to Earth to help Skrull refugees escape from Kree forces and later assists Carol Danvers.

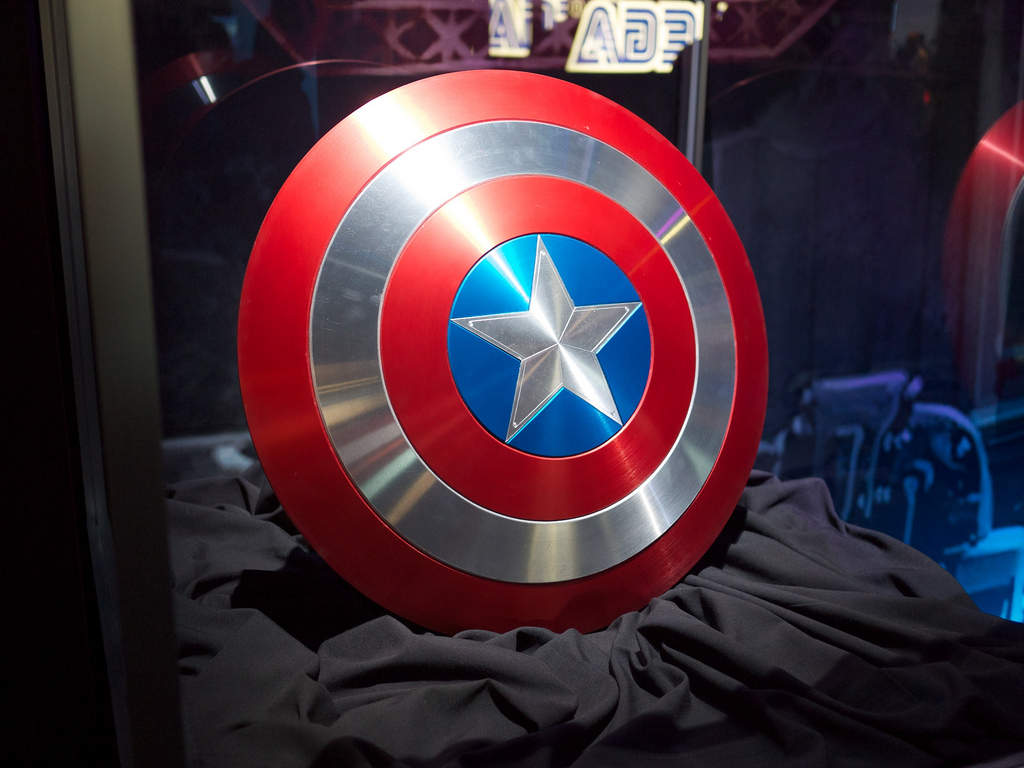
Steve Rogers was equipped with a vibranium shield, depicted here, in World War II.

- World War II (1939–1945) was a global conflict between the Allies and Axis. The United States create the super-soldier Captain America (Steve Rogers) to fight in the conflict, while Nazi Germany create the Red Skull (Johann Schmidt), leader of Hydra. In an alternate reality explored in the first episode of What If...?, Peggy Carter takes the Super Soldier Serum instead of Rogers and becomes Captain Carter.
- The Cold War (1947–1991) was a period of geopolitical tension between the United States and the Soviet Union during which the U.S. experimented with the Super Soldier Serum on Black soldiers, resulting in the creation of the super-soldier Isaiah Bradley. Meanwhile, Hydra (having infiltrated the Soviet Union) establishes the Winter Soldier Program and the Red Room, transforming Bucky Barnes and Natasha Romanoff into elite assassins.
- The assassination of Howard and Maria Stark (1991) was the murder of Howard and Maria Stark by a brainwashed Bucky Barnes under Vasily Karpov's control on December 16, 1991, in Long Island, New York. When the couple are on their way to the Pentagon, Barnes arrives on a motorcycle and slashes the front tire of their car, causing it to crash before beating Howard to death and strangling Maria. The assassination is covered as a car crash, results in Obadiah Stane assuming control of Stark Industries, and is used by Helmut Zemo to instigate tensions between Tony Stark and Steve Rogers during the Avengers Civil War.

=== 2010s ===
- The kidnapping of Tony Stark (2010) was carried out by the Ten Rings terrorist organization under orders of Obadiah Stane, a rival of Tony Stark. While performing a demonstration of his new Jericho Missile for the U.S. Air Force in Kunar, Afghanistan, Stark is kidnapped and forced to build the Jericho missile, but secretly builds a suit of armor with the help of Ho Yinsen instead and using it to escape. In an alternate reality explored in the sixth episode of What If...?, Stark is rescued by Erik "Killmonger" Stevens and never becomes Iron Man.
- Fury's Big Week (2011) was a series of events monitored by S.H.I.E.L.D. which transpired in one week. Over the course of the seven days, S.H.I.E.L.D. director Nick Fury sends Natasha Romanoff to spy on Tony Stark and Bruce Banner, Phil Coulson and Clint Barton investigate atmospheric disturbance above New Mexico and encounter Thor, while Erik Selvig is recruited to Project Pegasus. In an alternate reality explored in the third episode of What If...?, Fury's plans to assemble the Avengers are disrupted when its candidates are assassinated by Hank Pym.
- The Battle of New York (2012) was a large-scale battle between Loki and his Chitauri forces and the Avengers in Midtown Manhattan, New York. The World Security Council later orders a nuclear strike against the city in an attempt to end the battle, but Tony Stark intervenes and used the nuclear missile to destroy the Chitauri mother ship. In an alternate reality explored in Avengers: Endgame and the first episode of Loki, Loki escapes using the Tesseract following the battle, but is captured by the Time Variance Authority.
- The Hydra Uprising (2014–2015) was an attempt by Hydra to seize world control and establish a global totalitarian state using Project Insight to eliminate influential individuals who posed a threat to the group. The plan fails after the Helicarriers used are disabled and Alexander Pierce is killed by Nick Fury, resulting in the collapse of S.H.I.E.L.D. Hydra is defeated shortly after by the Avengers in Sokovia. The idea of S.H.I.E.L.D.'s collapse was suggested by Marvel Studios president Kevin Feige, which writers Christopher Markus and Stephen McFeely then implemented into Captain America: The Winter Soldier.
- The Battle of Sokovia (2015) was a battle in Sokovia between the Avengers and Ultron, with Ultron attempting to cause human extinction by dropping the capital city of Sokovia on Earth. The plan is foiled after the city is destroyed by the Avengers, and Ultron is killed by the Vision. In an alternate reality explored in the eighth episode of What If...?, Ultron successfully transfers his consciousness to Vision's body and gains the power of the Infinity Stones.
- The Avengers Civil War (2016) (based on the Marvel Comics storyline of the same name) was a conflict between the Avengers over the Sokovia Accords instigated by Helmut Zemo. The conflict is further instigated by the accidental bombing of Lagos, Nigeria by Wanda Maximoff, the assassination of King T'Chaka by Helmut Zemo, and the assassination of Howard and Maria Stark by Bucky Barnes, culminating in clashes at the Leipzig/Halle Airport in Germany and the Hydra Siberian Facility in Siberia.
- Ragnarök (2017) (based on the Norse mythological event of the same name) was the prophesied destruction of Asgard by Surtur. Classified by the Time Variance Authority as a Class Seven apocalyptic event, it is initiated by Thor after he realizes that it is the only way to defeat Hela, sending Loki to unite Surtur's crown with the Eternal Flame.
- The Infinity War (2018) (based on the Marvel Comics storylines The Infinity Gauntlet and Infinity) was a conflict between Thanos and the Avengers, Guardians of the Galaxy, and Wakandans over the Infinity Stones, with Thanos seeking to use them to wipe out half of life in the universe due to his fears of universal overpopulation and deprivation. It commences with Thanos obtaining the Power and Space Stones from Xandar and the Statesman, followed by an attack in Greenwich Village by Ebony Maw and Cull Obsidian. Thanos then retrieves the Reality Stone on Knowhere and the Soul Stone on Vormir, sacrificing his daughter Gamora in the process. The conflict culminates in two concurrent battles in Wakanda and on Titan, both of which end in Thanos's victory and allow him to obtain the Time and Mind Stones and complete the Infinity Gauntlet. Thanos then proceeds to snap his fingers, wiping out half of all life in the universe and initiating the Blip. In an alternate reality explored in the fifth episode of What If...?, Thanos's crusade coincides with a zombie apocalypse on Earth.
- The Blip (2018–2023) was the five-year period between the extermination of half of all life in the universe by Thanos and their subsequent resurrection by Bruce Banner. It manifested in the form of the mass disintegration of individual beings into ashes, while the reversal had the same ashes reforming into the previously deceased individuals, who mostly reappeared in the same location with no direct awareness of what occurred. The Global Repatriation Council (GRC) is later set up to aid those displaced by the Blip, although many such as the Flag Smashers oppose their efforts.

=== 2020s ===
- The Time Heist (2023) was the retrieval of the six Infinity Stones by the Avengers from four alternate timelines to undo the Blip, in which three teams travel back in time using the Quantum Tunnel to 2012 New York and 1970 Camp Lehigh, 2013 Asgard, as well as 2014 Morag and Vormir. The Avengers then unite the six stones into the Nano Gauntlet before Banner snaps his fingers, restoring the lives of half of the Universe.
- The Battle of Earth (2023) was a large-scale battle that took place in the ruins of the Avengers Compound between the Avengers, Guardians of the Galaxy, Masters of the Mystic Arts, Asgardians, Ravagers, and Wakandans against alternate versions of Thanos and his army from 2014. After subduing Tony Stark, Thor, and Steve Rogers, Thanos summons his army from the Sanctuary II with the goal of acquiring the Nano Gauntlet, but is interrupted by the arrival of the restored Guardians, Asgardians, Ravagers, and Wakandans. The two sides clash, and the battle culminates with Stark sacrificing himself to disintegrate Thanos and his army.

== See also ==
- Characters of the Marvel Cinematic Universe
- Species of the Marvel Cinematic Universe
- Teams and organizations of the Marvel Cinematic Universe
