= Steve Rogers (Marvel Cinematic Universe) =

Character in the Marvel Cinematic Universe

- Marvel Cinematic Universe character
- Chris Evans as Steve Rogers / Captain America in Avengers: Age of Ultron (2015)
- First appearance: Captain America: The First Avenger (2011)
- Based on: Captain America by: Joe Simon; Jack Kirby
- Adapted by: Christopher Markus Stephen McFeely
- Portrayed by: Chris Evans (Note: Leander Deeny (skinny body double; The First Avenger), Christopher George Sarris (skinny body double; The First Avenger), Patrick Gorman (elderly body double; Endgame))
- Voiced by: Chris Evans (film video game); Josh Keaton (What If...?)

In-universe information
- Full name: Steven Grant Rogers (Note: As stated when Rogers is inaugurated President of the United States in the What If...? episode "What If... Ultron Won?".)
- Alias: Captain America
- Species: Human mutate
- Title: Captain (later honorary)
- Occupation: Leader of the Avengers; Grief counselor; Agent of S.H.I.E.L.D.; Soldier
- Affiliation: Avengers; Howling Commandos; S.H.I.E.L.D.; S.T.R.I.K.E.; Strategic Scientific Reserve; United States Army
- Weapon: Captain America's shield; Mjolnir; Dual Wakandan vibranium gauntlets; Various weaponized motorcycles; Colt M1911A1
- Family: Joseph Rogers (father); Sarah Rogers (mother)
- Significant other: Peggy Carter
- Origin: Brooklyn, New York, United States
- Nationality: American
- Abilities: Superhuman strength, speed, endurance, durability and reflexes; Accelerated healing and longevity; Expert tactician and strategist; Master hand-to-hand combatant

Steven Grant Rogers is a superhero based on the Marvel Comics character Captain America. Portrayed by Chris Evans in the Marvel Cinematic Universe (MCU) media franchise, Rogers is depicted as a World War II–era super soldier who was given a serum that provided him with superhuman abilities, including enhanced durability, strength, and athleticism. He is childhood best friends with Bucky Barnes and served alongside him in the Howling Commandos; during his fight against the Nazi secret organization Hydra, he was frozen in the Arctic for sixty-six years until being revived in the 21st century.

Rogers becomes a founding member and leader of the Avengers. Following internal conflict within the Avengers due to the Sokovia Accords and Thanos initiating the Blip, Rogers leads the team on a final mission, and they successfully restore trillions of lives across the universe and defeat Thanos. After returning the Infinity Stones to their original timelines, he remains in the 1940s with his lost love, Peggy Carter; they marry, and Rogers lives a full life. Rogers chooses Sam Wilson to be his successor, passing his shield and the title of Captain America on to him.

Rogers is a central figure in the MCU, appearing in nine films as of 2026. When first introduced in Captain America: The First Avenger (2011), the character received mixed reception, but gradually became a fan favorite. Chris Evans's portrayal of Steve Rogers has received acclaim, and the character is often cited, along with Robert Downey Jr.'s Tony Stark, as cementing the success of the MCU. His story arc is considered to be one of the best in the MCU, and the Captain America films within the "Infinity Saga" are commonly referred to as the franchise's best trilogy. Rogers will return in Avengers: Doomsday (2026).

Alternate versions of Rogers from within the MCU multiverse also appear in the film Avengers: Endgame (2019) and in the animated series What If...? (2021–2023), voiced by Josh Keaton. These versions include an incarnation of Rogers, who, instead of receiving the serum, wears a mechanized suit of armor and becomes the Hydra Stomper.

== Concept and creation ==
Captain America was first conceived as a comic book character in 1940, as a direct response to the military actions of Nazi Germany, prior to the United States entering World War II. The initial introduction of the character included the concepts of a soldier named Steve Rogers being given a serum bestowing enhanced strength and agility, wearing a patriotic red, white and blue uniform, carrying a shield, and having as a sidekick, a teenaged Bucky Barnes. In the 1960s, Marvel decided to test bringing the character back as part of the Avengers, with the premise that the character had been frozen for the two decades since the war, and was "haunted by past memories, and trying to adapt to 1960s society". Live-action performances of the character in television and film serials began within a few years after its creation, with a 1990 feature film resulting in critical and financial failure.

In the mid-2000s, Kevin Feige realized that Marvel still owned the rights to the core members of the Avengers, which included Captain America. Feige, a self-professed "fanboy", envisioned creating a shared universe just as creators Stan Lee and Jack Kirby had done with their comic books in the early 1960s. In 2005, Marvel received a $525 million investment from Merrill Lynch, allowing them to independently produce ten films, including Captain America. Paramount Pictures agreed to distribute the film.

"Casting Captain America was super hard. I started to think, 'Are we not going to be able to find Captain America, and if we can't, what are we going to do with Avengers? Is the whole thing going to fall apart?' And, then, finally opening ourselves up to Chris Evans, who we had initially sort of just looked past because he was Johnny Storm in a Fantastic Four franchise. Then, bringing him in and showing him the artwork, showing him what was happening in this movie, and he took a weekend to decide."

— Kevin Feige, President of Production for Marvel Studios, on casting Chris Evans as Captain America.

Originally, the film would stand alone; Feige said "about half" the movie would be set during World War II before moving into the modern day. Producer Avi Arad said, "The biggest opportunity with Captain America is as a man 'out of time', coming back today, looking at our world through the eyes of someone who thought the perfect world was small-town United States. Sixty years go by, and who are we today? Are we better?" He cited the Back to the Future trilogy as an influence, and claimed he had "someone in mind to be the star, and definitely someone in mind to be the director". In February 2006, Arad hoped to have a summer 2008 theatrical release date. In April 2006, David Self was hired to write the script. Joe Johnston met with Marvel to discuss directing the film and signed on in November 2008, hiring Christopher Markus and Stephen McFeely to rewrite.

Variety reported in March 2010 that Chris Evans was cast as Captain America; Ryan Phillippe and John Krasinski were also considered for the role. Evans, who previously worked with Marvel as the Human Torch in the Fantastic Four film series, initially declined the part three times before signing a six-picture deal with Marvel, saying, "I think Marvel is doing a lot of good things right now, and it's a fun character. ... I think the story of Steve Rogers is great. He's a great guy. Even if it [were] just a script about anybody, I would probably want to do it. So it wasn't necessarily about the comic itself." In April, it was reported that Joss Whedon would rewrite the script as part of his negotiation to write and direct The Avengers. Whedon said in August, "I just got to make some character connections. The structure of the thing was really tight and I loved it, but there were a couple of opportunities to find his voice a little bit —and some of the other characters'— and make the connections so that you understood exactly why he wanted to be who he wanted to be. And progressing through the script to flesh it out a little bit".

== Fictional character biography ==
=== Early life ===
Steve Rogers was born on July 4, 1918, in Brooklyn, New York, to Joseph and Sarah Rogers. His father, a member of the 107th Infantry Regiment, was killed by mustard gas during World War I. He was raised by his mother, a nurse, who died of tuberculosis, leaving Rogers alone at the age of eighteen. (Note: As stated in the letter he wrote to Tony Stark at the end of Captain America: Civil War.) At just 5-foot-4-inch (1.63 m) tall and weighing only 90 pounds (41 kg), Rogers was also afflicted with a number of medical issues including asthma, scoliosis, heart arrhythmia, partial deafness, stomach ulcers, and pernicious anemia. (Note: As seen in a museum exhibit shown in Captain America: The Winter Soldier.)

=== World War II ===
At the outset of World War II, Rogers attempts to enlist in the U.S. Armed Forces but is repeatedly rejected due to his numerous health problems. In 1942, while attending the Stark Expo with his best friend, James Barnes, Rogers again attempts to enlist. Dr. Abraham Erskine overhears Rogers speaking with Barnes and approves his enlistment due to his continued efforts to serve his country despite his physical handicaps. He is recruited into the Strategic Scientific Reserve (SSR) as part of a super-soldier experiment under Erskine, U.S. Army Colonel Chester Phillips, and British MI6 agent Peggy Carter. The night before the treatment, Erskine reveals to Rogers that Nazi officer Johann Schmidt, head of the science division called Hydra, underwent an imperfect version of the procedure and suffered permanent side-effects. Nonetheless, Rogers agrees to the treatment and is injected with Erskine's serum and doused with vita-rays. After Rogers emerges significantly taller and more muscular, an undercover assassin kills Erskine and flees. Rogers, using his remarkable speed and strength increase, pursues and captures the assassin, who reveals he is a Hydra agent and commits suicide with a cyanide capsule. With Erskine dead and the formula lost, U.S. Senator Brandt takes advantage of the media hype around Rogers' actions and has him tour the nation in a colorful costume with the title of Captain America to promote the sale of War Bonds.

While on tour in Italy, Rogers learns that the 107th – Barnes' unit – was MIA in a battle against Schmidt's forces. Rogers asks Carter and engineer Howard Stark to fly him behind enemy lines to mount a solo rescue attempt. Rogers infiltrates the Hydra facility, freeing Barnes and 400 other prisoners. Rogers confronts Schmidt, who reveals himself to be the "Red Skull" and escapes. Despite disobeying orders, Rogers is rewarded for his heroics and is formally promoted to the rank of Captain. He recruits Barnes and several other elite soldiers, who were among the prisoners he rescued, to form a team called the Howling Commandos to attack other Hydra bases. Stark outfits Rogers with advanced equipment, most notably a circular shield made of vibranium, a rare, nearly indestructible metal. Over the next two years, Rogers and the Howling Commandos help to turn the tide of the war in favor of the Allies. The team eventually captures top Hydra scientist Dr. Arnim Zola on a train, but Barnes falls to his presumed death during the battle. Using information extracted from Zola, Rogers leads an attack on the final Hydra stronghold to stop Schmidt from using weapons of mass destruction on major American cities. Rogers infiltrates the final Hydra base with the help of the SSR, including Carter who reveals her mutual romantic feelings toward Rogers and the two share a kiss before Schmidt escapes in an aircraft carrying the weapons and is pursued by Rogers. During the confrontation, the source of Hydra's advanced weapons, the Tesseract, is physically handled by Schmidt causing him to vanish within a bright light. The Tesseract is lost in the ocean and with no way to land the plane without the risk of detonating the bombs, Rogers reluctantly bids farewell to Carter via the plane's communications system and crashes it and himself in the Arctic, leading to him being presumed dead.

=== Joining the Avengers ===
In 2011, Rogers awakens in a 1940s-style hospital room. Deducing from an anachronistic baseball radio broadcast that something isn't right, he flees the building and finds himself in present-day Times Square, where S.H.I.E.L.D. director Nick Fury informs him that he has been frozen in suspended animation for nearly 70 years.

Rogers learns that most of his World War II-era comrades are deceased, and he struggles to adjust to the modern world. In 2012, he is approached by Fury, who has activated the "Avengers Initiative", with an assignment to retrieve the stolen Tesseract from Loki. Rogers agrees and is introduced to Natasha Romanoff and Bruce Banner by Phil Coulson. In Stuttgart, Rogers and Loki have a brief physical confrontation until Tony Stark arrives, resulting in Loki's surrender. While Loki is being escorted to S.H.I.E.L.D. on the Quinjet, his brother Thor arrives and frees him, hoping to convince him to abandon his plan. After a confrontation between Thor, Stark, and Rogers, Thor agrees to take Loki to S.H.I.E.L.D.'s flying aircraft carrier, the Helicarrier.

The Avengers become divided, both over how to approach Loki and the revelation that S.H.I.E.L.D. plans to harness the Tesseract to develop weapons much like Hydra had in the 1940s. Agents possessed by Loki, including Clint Barton, attack the Helicarrier, disabling one of its engines in flight, which Stark and Rogers work together to restart. Loki escapes, and Stark and Rogers realize that for Loki, he needs to overpower them publicly to validate himself as ruler of Earth. Rogers recruits Barton to join the Avengers after he is freed from his mind control by Romanoff. Loki uses the Tesseract to open a wormhole in New York City above Stark Tower, allowing the alien army of the Chitauri to invade. Rogers successfully leads the Avengers in defending the city and they defeat and capture Loki. Following the battle, Rogers coordinates the search and rescue of injured civilians. Thor returns Loki to Asgard to face justice for his invasion and the Avengers go their separate ways. Rogers, with newfound purpose in the modern world, rides off on his motorcycle.

Sometime afterwards, Rogers records a number of public service announcements for high school students, encouraging them to do things like maintain healthy lifestyles, obey rules, and practice patience. (Note: As depicted in the post-credit scene of Spider-Man: Homecoming (2017))

=== The Winter Soldier ===
In 2014, Rogers works for S.H.I.E.L.D. in Washington, D.C. under Fury, while continuing to adjust to contemporary society. Rogers and Romanoff are sent with S.H.I.E.L.D.'s counter-terrorism S.T.R.I.K.E. team, led by Brock Rumlow, to free hostages aboard a S.H.I.E.L.D. satellite launch vessel, the Lemurian Star, that has been hijacked by a terrorist group led by Georges Batroc. Rogers and S.T.R.I.K.E successfully rescue the hostages, but Batroc escapes when Rogers discovers Romanoff has her own agenda: to extract data from the ship's computers for Fury. Rogers returns to the Triskelion, S.H.I.E.L.D.'s headquarters, to confront Fury and is briefed about Project Insight: three Helicarriers linked to spy satellites designed to preemptively eliminate threats against America. Rogers, citing his moral issues with such a program, expresses concern that the project will likely result in the deaths of innocent people. He visits an elderly Carter who expresses regret that Rogers never got to live the life he deserved.

Unable to decrypt the data recovered by Romanoff, Fury becomes suspicious about Insight and asks senior S.H.I.E.L.D. official Alexander Pierce to delay the project. Fury, ambushed by assailants led by the Winter Soldier, escapes and warns Rogers that S.H.I.E.L.D. is compromised. Fury is gunned down by the Winter Soldier, but hands Rogers a flash drive containing Romanoff's data. Pierce summons Rogers to the Triskelion, revealing evidence that Fury hired Batroc to hijack the ship as cover to retrieve the data, but when Rogers withholds Fury's information, Pierce brands him a fugitive. Hunted by S.T.R.I.K.E., Rogers escapes capture and meets with Romanoff. Using the data, they discover a secret S.H.I.E.L.D. bunker below Camp Leigh, Rogers' old military training base in New Jersey, where they activate a supercomputer containing the preserved consciousness of Arnim Zola. Zola reveals that after S.H.I.E.L.D. was founded following World War II, Hydra has secretly operated within its ranks and creating world crisis that will eventually cause humanity to sacrifice freedom for security. A S.H.I.E.L.D. missile destroys the bunker, and the pair realize that Pierce is Hydra's leader.

Rogers and Romanoff enlist the help of former USAF pararescueman Sam Wilson, whom Rogers befriended earlier, and acquire his powered "Falcon" wingpack. Deducing that S.H.I.E.L.D. agent Jasper Sitwell is a Hydra mole, they force him to divulge Hydra's plan to use satellite-guided guns to eliminate individuals identified by an algorithm as a threat to Hydra. They are ambushed by the Winter Soldier, whom Rogers recognizes as Barnes. S.H.I.E.L.D. operative Maria Hill manages to extract the trio to a safehouse where Fury, who faked his death, is waiting with plans to sabotage the Helicarriers by replacing their controller chips. After the World Security Council members arrive for the Helicarriers' launch, Rogers exposes Hydra's plot causing an internal conflict within S.H.I.E.L.D. Rogers and Wilson storm two Helicarriers and replace the controller chips, but the Winter Soldier destroys Wilson's suit and fights Rogers on the third. Rogers fends him off and replaces the final chip, allowing Hill to have the vessels destroy each other. Rogers refuses to fight the Winter Soldier in an attempt to reach his friend, but as the ship collides with the Triskelion, Rogers is thrown into the Potomac River. Barnes rescues the unconscious Rogers and departs. S.H.I.E.L.D. officially disbands and after Rogers recovers from his injuries, he and Wilson partner together to find Barnes.

=== Ultron ===
In 2015, in the Eastern European country of Sokovia, Rogers leads the Avengers against a Hydra facility to recover Loki's scepter. They are attacked by the twins Wanda and Pietro Maximoff, two superhuman experimental volunteers. The Avengers succeed in obtaining the scepter and Rogers captures Hydra leader Baron Strucker. Returning to the Avengers Tower, Stark and Banner use the scepter to complete Stark's "Ultron" global defense program. Afterwards, the Avengers host a celebratory party and Ultron reveals himself and attacks the team at the Avengers Tower, before escaping. In Johannesburg, the Avengers confront and battle Ultron, Wanda, and Pietro. Rogers is subdued by Wanda after she produces hallucinatory visions. After Maximoff also causes the Hulk to ravage the city before being subdued by Stark, Rogers and the other defeated Avengers take refuge at Barton's safe house so they can recover. While there, they are encouraged by Fury to assemble and stop Ultron.

In Seoul, Rogers, Romanoff, and Barton attempt to stop Ultron from uploading his network into a synthetic vibranium body powered by the Mind Stone. Rogers fights Ultron in an attempt to keep him from completing the upload. He is assisted by the Maximoff twins who side with the Avengers after learning Ultron plans to exterminate humanity. They retrieve the synthetic body, but Romanoff is captured. At Avengers Tower, the Avengers have a dispute over the synthetic body which is activated and becomes Vision. Rogers and the Avengers then return to Sokovia, where they engage in a battle against Ultron and are able to defeat him, but at the cost of Pietro's life and the complete destruction of the city. At the new Avengers Compound in Upstate New York, Rogers and Romanoff begin training new team members: Wanda, James Rhodes, Vision, and Wilson.

=== Sokovia Accords ===
In 2016, Rogers, Maximoff, Romanoff, and Wilson stop Rumlow, now working as a mercenary, from stealing a biological weapon from a lab in Lagos. Rumlow attempts to kill Rogers with a suicide bomb, but Maximoff saves him. However, she accidentally kills several Wakandan humanitarian workers in the process. This leads to U.S. Secretary of State Thaddeus Ross informing the Avengers that the United Nations is preparing to pass the Sokovia Accords, which will establish a U.N. panel to oversee and control the team. The Avengers are divided: Stark supports oversight because of his role in Ultron's creation and Sokovia's devastation, while Rogers is hesitant to give the government that kind of control over the team.

Helmut Zemo, seeking to destroy the Avengers as revenge for the death of his family in Sokovia, tracks down and kills Barnes' old Hydra handler, stealing a book containing the trigger words that activate Barnes' Winter Soldier brainwashing. Barnes is framed for the Vienna bombing that kills King T'Chaka of Wakanda, and T'Chaka's son T'Challa, the Black Panther, vows vengeance. Rogers and Wilson track Barnes to Bucharest and attempt to protect him from T'Challa and the authorities, but are apprehended. Impersonating a psychiatrist sent to interview Barnes, Zemo sends Barnes on a rampage to cover his own escape. Rogers stops Barnes and hides him. (Note: As depicted in the post-credit scene of Ant-Man (2015)) When Barnes regains his senses, he explains that Zemo is the real Vienna bomber and wanted the location of the Siberian Hydra base, where other brainwashed "Winter Soldiers" are kept in cryogenic stasis.

Rogers and Wilson go rogue; they recruit Barton, Scott Lang, and Maximoff to their cause. Stark assembles a team composed of Romanoff, Rhodes, Vision, T'Challa, and Peter Parker to capture the rogue Avengers. They fight at Leipzig/Halle Airport in Germany, until Romanoff helps Rogers and Barnes escape. Stark strikes a truce with Rogers and Barnes after finding out about Zemo, but Zemo reveals footage of an automobile Barnes had intercepted in 1991 that contained Stark's parents, whom Barnes subsequently killed. Enraged that Rogers kept this from him, Stark turns on them. After an intense fight, Rogers disables Stark's Iron Man armor and departs with Barnes, leaving his shield behind. Rogers breaks his team out of the Raft, and heads to Wakanda with Barnes, where Barnes chooses to return to cryogenic sleep until a cure for his brainwashing is found. Wanted by the U.N. for breaking the Sokovia Accords, Rogers, Maximoff, Romanoff, and Wilson go into hiding, while Barton and Lang strike a deal with the government for house arrest so that they can be with their families.

=== Thanos and the Infinity War ===
In 2018, Rogers, Romanoff, and Wilson rescue Maximoff and Vision in Scotland from Corvus Glaive and Proxima Midnight, two of Thanos' children. They return to the Avengers Compound, reuniting with Banner and Rhodes. Rhodes refuses Secretary Ross's order to arrest Rogers, Romanoff, Wilson, and Maximoff; and Rogers informs Ross they intend to defend the Earth against the incoming threat, with or without permission from the Sokovia Accords. Rogers and the team travel to Wakanda to have Shuri remove the Mind Stone from Vision without destroying him in the process. Rogers orders Maximoff to destroy the Stone as soon as it is removed from his head. As Thanos' children and the Outriders invade the battlefield, Rogers, Barnes, Romanoff, Wilson, Rhodes, Banner, T'Challa, and the Wakandan armies mount a defense and get support when Thor, Rocket Raccoon, and Groot arrive. Rogers attempts to rally the Avengers against Thanos who successfully destroys Vision, obtains the Mind Stone, and completes the Infinity Gauntlet. Rogers survives the Blip, but is left defeated.

Returning to the Compound, Rogers and Romanoff assess the worldwide casualties and discover that Thanos destroyed half of all living things. They are met by Carol Danvers, who arrives answering Fury's pager. (Note: As depicted in the mid-credit scene of Captain Marvel (2019)) Sometime after, Rogers shaves his beard, before hearing the Benatar arrive. He, Romanoff, Rhodes, Banner, Rocket, and Pepper Potts go outside and see Danvers bringing Stark and Nebula to the Compound. After making a plan, Rogers leads Rocket, Danvers, Thor, Romanoff, Rhodes, Banner, and Nebula into space on the Benatar to hunt Thanos at his garden planet. They confront and subdue Thanos and are horrified to learn that he destroyed the stones to prevent his mission from ever being undone. A defeated Rogers watches an enraged Thor decapitate Thanos.

=== Avenging the fallen ===
In 2023, Rogers leads a support group for grieving survivors in New York City, while living at the Avengers Compound. One day, Rogers and Romanoff are shocked when Lang arrives at the Compound and explains that he has been trapped in the Quantum Realm and suggests using it as a form of time travel. Rogers, Romanoff, and Lang visit Stark at his lakeside cabin but he refuses to help. They meet Banner at a diner who agrees, however, their initial attempts at time travel are unsuccessful. Stark returns to the Compound, revealing he has unlocked the key to successful time travel, and he and Rogers conclude their nearly decade-long feud, reestablishing their trust in one another with Stark returning Rogers' shield. After Barton, Thor, Rhodes, Rocket, and Nebula return to the Compound, the team formulates a plan and Rogers teams up with Stark, Banner, and Lang to travel to an alternate 2012 to retrieve the three Stones present in New York City during Loki's invasion.

Rogers secures the mind stone, but encounters an alternate 2012 version of himself who believes Rogers is Loki. The two battle, and Rogers emerges victorious. Stark and Lang fail to recover the Space Stone, which was stolen by the alternate 2012 Loki. This necessitates a trip to 1970 so that Stark can recover it from a S.H.I.E.L.D. base in Camp Leigh, New Jersey, while Rogers steals Pym Particles from Hank Pym for their trip back. While there, Rogers sees the 1970 version of Peggy Carter through a window. The Avengers return, save for Romanoff who sacrificed herself for the mission, and the original Avengers hold a silent mourning for her. After Rocket, Stark, and Banner create a gauntlet, Banner reverses the Blip. However, an alternate Thanos from his 2014 timeline emerges from the quantum realm and attacks the Compound.

Rogers, Stark and Thor engage Thanos and during the fight, Rogers proves worthy to wield Thor's hammer Mjolnir. Thanos proves too powerful and Rogers, bruised and battered with his shield in tatters, stands up alone to face Thanos and his entire army. However, the restored Avengers, the Guardians of the Galaxy, the Wakandan army, Masters of the Mystic Arts, Ravagers, and Asgardians arrive and Rogers rallies them all in a final battle against Thanos. During the battle, Rogers witnesses Danvers' return. With no other options for victory, Stark steals the Infinity Stones from Thanos and snaps his fingers. Thanos and his army disintegrate, and Stark dies while Rogers and Thor looks on in grief.

After attending Stark's funeral, Rogers reunites with Barnes, Wilson, and Banner before returning the Infinity Stones and Mjolnir to their appropriate timelines. However, Rogers also decides to go back to 1949 to reunite with Carter, where he marries and lives a full life with her. (Note: It's contested whether or not Rogers's action has created a new timeline. Directors Joe and Anthony Russo have stated that Rogers created a new timeline when he reunited with Carter, and then found a way to return to the present in his old age. Meanwhile, writers Christopher Markus and Stephen McFeely have stated that Rogers found a way to break the time travel rules and live his life with Carter in the main timeline. This opens up the possibility of two different versions of Rogers existing simultaneously, as the writers stated that both of them were present for Peggy's funeral in Civil War.) He returns to Barnes, Wilson, and Banner as an elderly man finally at peace, and passes his shield and mantle to Wilson. Rogers remembers giving Carter the dance that he promised her, to the song "It's Been a Long, Long Time". The two are interrupted by a knock on the door by the alternate Loki from 2012, now an agent of the Time Variance Authority, who ominously offers to help them.

=== Legacy ===
In spring 2024, Wilson struggles with the idea of taking up Rogers' title as Captain America and instead gives the shield to the U.S. government so it can be displayed in a Smithsonian museum exhibit dedicated to Rogers. Joaquin Torres mentions to Wilson that discussions about Rogers' whereabouts have become an internet conspiracy theory, and a common one is that he is hidden in a secret moonbase. The government names John Walker as the new Captain America and gives him the shield.

Barnes confronts Wilson, who reveals that he did not feel comfortable being Rogers' successor. Walker indicates his desire to fill Rogers' shoes but comes into conflict with Wilson and Barnes, who refuse to work with him and the Global Repatriation Council (GRC) in tracking down the Flag Smashers, a group of terrorist super soldiers. Barnes introduces Wilson to Isaiah Bradley, an African-American successor to Rogers that he came into conflict with during the Korean War. Bradley was kept a secret (even from Rogers), imprisoned for thirty years, and experimented on by the government and Hydra. Wilson and Barnes learn that Bradley's blood was used to create a new variation of the Super Soldier Serum for the Power Broker but was stolen and used by the Flag Smashers. Helmut Zemo destroys all but one of the remaining vials of the serum, which is secretly retrieved by Walker, who uses it and gains super soldier abilities. Walker murders a Flag Smasher with the shield while a horrified crowd watches and records him. Wilson and Barnes forcibly take the shield from Walker, who has the Captain America title stripped from him by the government. Wilson eventually takes up the mantle as Rogers intended. Wilson, with assistance from Barnes, Walker, and Sharon Carter, defeats the Flag Smashers, and Wilson convinces the GRC to end its forced resettlement practices. Wilson later has a memorial dedicated to Isaiah Bradley added to the Captain America museum exhibit.

Students at Midtown School of Science and Technology create a tribute video, with Rogers being included. (Note: As depicted in Spider-Man: Far From Home (2019)) That same year, the Statue of Liberty is modified and undergoes construction to replace the torch with Captain America's shield; this addition is destroyed in a battle between Peter Parker and the Green Goblin, a supervillain from another reality, and is not reinstalled in the aftermath. Additionally, a Broadway theatre production entitled Rogers: The Musical is created as an homage to Rogers. While Barton is in New York City, he attends the musical with his family and is displeased with the musical's upbeat depiction of the Battle of New York. (Note: As depicted in the first episode, "Never Meet Your Heroes", of Hawkeye (2021)) A memorial plaque commemorating the first assembling of the Avengers is seen by the Grand Central Terminal, and as the leader, Rogers' name is on the top of the memorial. In 2025, a statue of Rogers is seen at the entrance of AvengerCon at the rebuilt Camp Lehigh. (Note: As depicted in the first episode, Generation Why, of Ms. Marvel (2022))

== Alternate versions ==
Other versions of Rogers are depicted in the alternate realities of the MCU multiverse.

=== 2012 variant ===
In an alternate 2012, Rogers, having successfully led the Avengers to victory over Loki, prepares to coordinate search and rescue of civilians when he encounters the time traveling 2023-Rogers in Stark Tower. 2012-Rogers, having heard that Loki escaped custody, believes 2023-Rogers is Loki using magic to disguise himself, and attacks him. After a brief confrontation, 2012-Rogers manages to put 2023-Rogers in a chokehold but is tricked into releasing him when 2023-Rogers, using his knowledge of future events, mentions Barnes being alive. 2023-Rogers uses Loki's scepter to render 2012-Rogers unconscious.

=== What If...? (2021–2024) ===
Several alternate versions of Rogers appear in the animated series What If...?, in which he is voiced by Josh Keaton.

- In an alternate 1943, Rogers gets shot by a Hydra agent before he can receive the Super Soldier Serum. Instead, Peggy Carter receives the serum, transforming into Captain Carter. After Carter recovers the Tesseract from Hydra, Howard Stark uses it to build a large mechanized suit of armor for Rogers. He is subsequently codenamed the Hydra Stomper. He and Carter bond and Rogers encourages her to prove her critics wrong. Rogers joins Carter's Howling Commandos on a mission to assassinate the Red Skull. Rogers is caught off-guard on a train loaded with explosives. They detonate, causing an avalanche after which Rogers is presumed dead. In a final mission to stop Hydra at their research facility, the Commandos find a captured Rogers and the Hydra Stomper suit. The Commandos use a generator to repower the suit, and Rogers rejoins the fight. The Red Skull opens a portal to another dimension using the Tesseract, and a tentacled creature travels through, killing him. Carter and Rogers fight together against the creature, but Rogers' suit runs out of power, and Carter chooses to push the monster back through the portal herself. In 2014, Carter and Romanoff find Rogers' Hydra Stomper armor aboard the Lemurian Star, with Romanoff revealing that someone was inside. This proves to be a slightly older Rogers who was captured in 1953 by the Red Room while destroying Hydra and brainwashed to be one of their assassins, becoming the world's most deadly killer and a terrorist. Rogers attacks the two women and later attempts to assassinate Barnes, who is now the Secretary of State, but he is captured by Carter and Romanoff. The two take Steve to a secret hideout in Scotland where they discover that biotech in the suit has prevented Rogers' aging, but is also the only thing keeping him alive. Awakening apparently free of the brainwashing, Rogers leads them to an abandoned test site in Sokovia used by the Red Room, reminiscing with Carter about how different the future is and admitting that he hadn't wanted to settle down with a normal life and a family unless it was with Carter. However, their reunion is interrupted by an attack by the Red Room. Reactivating Rogers' brainwashing, Melina Vostokoff reveals that his mission was always to capture Carter for the Red Room. During the battle that follows, Carter manages to break through the brainwashing and Rogers seemingly sacrifices himself to destroy the Red Room while dragging Vostokoff with him. However, Carter is not convinced that Rogers is dead and intends to find and save him.
- In an alternate 2011, most of the original candidates for Fury's Avengers Initiative are killed by a vengeful Hank Pym as Yellowjacket. Rogers is the only one to survive as he is still frozen in ice at the time. Following Pym's defeat and Loki's subjugation of Earth, Fury finds and prepares to release Rogers from the ice. Sometime later, Rogers joins Fury, Carol Danvers, and S.H.I.E.L.D. in fighting Loki and his Asgardian army. The Watcher brings in a Romanoff from another universe who subdues Loki using his Scepter.
- In an alternate 2018, Rogers leads the Avengers to San Francisco to respond to a quantum virus outbreak, but are infected upon arrival and transform into zombies. When a group of survivors attempt to escape New York by train, a zombified Rogers infects Sharon Carter before fighting Barnes, who slices Rogers in half using his shield.
  - In Marvel Zombies, the zombified Rogers (the remaining half of his body) returns with an army led by the zombie Okoye to attack the Black Widows' base. He enters a duct to attack and is killed by Alexei Shostakov.
- In an alternate 2015, Rogers, alongside Thor, Banner, and Stark are killed by Ultron who successfully uploads his consciousness into a new vibranium body, becoming powerful enough to eradicate all life on Earth.
- In another universe, footage of Rogers being inaugurated as President of the United States is shown in Times Square during Ultron's fight with the Watcher.
- In an alternate 2014, Rogers dresses up as a Christmas elf at a shopping mall while Stark dresses up as Santa Claus. Rogers attracts the attention from several women before he and Stark leave to regroup with Romanoff, Barton, and Banner. They arrive at Avengers Tower and attack the Freak, before being told by Darcy Lewis that he was Hogan. They see that Justin Hammer had actually attacked the Tower. After Hammer is apprehended by Freak who saved him from falling off Avengers Tower, they have their annual Christmas party.
- In an alternate 2018, Rogers fights against Thanos in the battle of Wakanda. During his fight, Rogers strikes the Time Stone in the Infinity Gauntlet with his shield, causing a temporal anomaly and sends him to 1602 and compresses 1602 and 2018 together, threatening to destroy the universe. Rogers then becomes known as "Rogers Hood" (a homage to Robin Hood), the leader of a group of thieves (similar to the Merry Men) including Barnes and Lang. One day, they stop a carriage carrying Loki and try to steal their food, but are approached by Captain Carter. Rogers is in disbelief because his Carter known as Maid Margaret (similar to Maid Marian) died but expresses excitement to meet her. They all go to a pub, where he asks her about her universe's Rogers. The Royal Yellowjackets attack on Sir Harold "Happy" Hogan's command to arrest Carter and Rogers helps fight them off before leaving. He, Barnes, and Lang later regroup with Carter, Stark, and Banner and they make a plan to take Thor's Scepter. In the courtroom, Rogers helps Barnes fight off Red Skull, before Hogan, as the Freak, engages in a fight with Rogers. After Carter puts the Scepter's Time Stone in Stark's device, Rogers is identified as the time-displaced person setting off the incursion and Carter sends him back to his time via the Time Stone, restoring everything to normal.
- In an alternate universe, Rogers, along with Barton, Romanoff, Stark, and Thor are killed while fighting in the first Gamma War against an Apex Hulk and the gamma creatures.

== Appearances ==
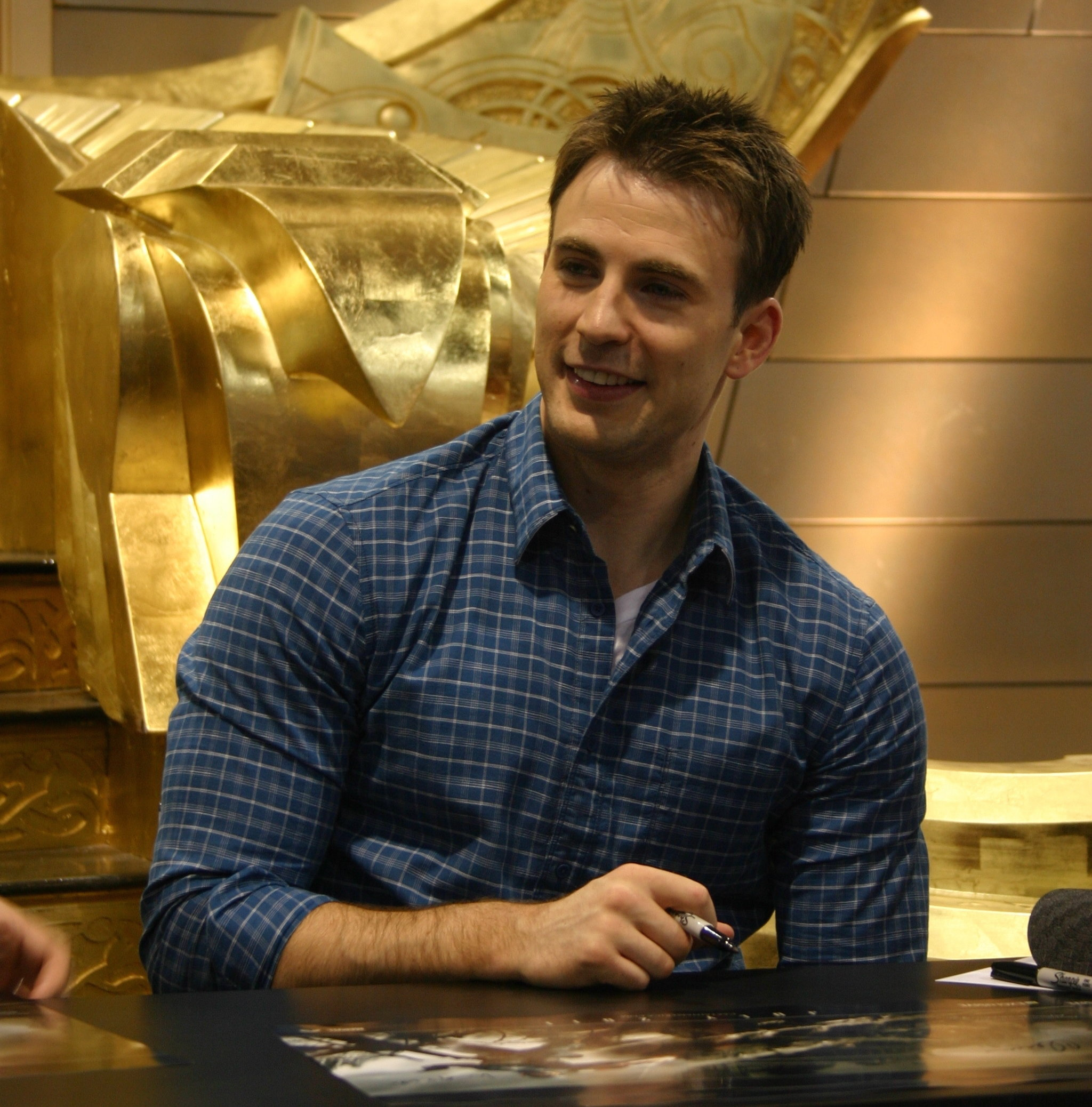
Chris Evans promoting the film Captain America: The First Avenger at the 2010 San Diego Comic-Con

Chris Evans portrays Steve Rogers in the Marvel Cinematic Universe films Captain America: The First Avenger (2011), The Avengers (2012), Captain America: The Winter Soldier (2014), Avengers: Age of Ultron (2015), Captain America: Civil War (2016), Spider-Man: Homecoming (2017), Avengers: Infinity War (2018), and Avengers: Endgame (2019). In addition, Evans makes uncredited cameo appearances as the character in Ant-Man (2015) and Captain Marvel (2019), and as Loki impersonating him in Thor: The Dark World (2013).

Evans confirmed that he intended to retire from the role after the fourth Avengers film, leading to speculation that the character would die over the course of the final film; in the finale of Endgame, Rogers uses a means of time travel to go back and live out a full life with Peggy Carter, with his elder self later appearing in the present to pass on his shield to Sam Wilson. Theater actor Leander Deeny was the body double in some shots in the first film for Steve Rogers' pre-transformation physique, while Patrick Gorman served as the body double for elderly Steve Rogers. In January 2021, Evans was reportedly close to signing a deal with to reprise the role of Captain America in at least one future MCU project. Evans' involvement was said to be similar to how Robert Downey Jr. appeared in large supporting roles in other film franchises, such as Civil War and Homecoming, after concluding the Iron Man film series with Iron Man 3 (2013). Evans tweeted shortly after the report of his return that it was "news to [him]". In December 2025, Evans was revealed to be reprising his role as Rogers in Avengers: Doomsday (2026), continuing from his last appearance in Endgame.

=== References in other films ===
- In Iron Man (2008), a replica of Captain America's shield can be seen in Tony Stark's workshop when J.A.R.V.I.S. is removing his armor and Pepper Potts spots him.
- In The Incredible Hulk (2008), General Ross mentions to Emil Blonsky that there was a World War II program focused around the creation a Super Soldier Serum, which Ross himself was attempting to rejuvenate through the use of gamma radiation. Bruce Banner was used as an unwitting pawn during this project, and his intense exposure to the radiation combined with the effects of Serum was what ultimately caused his transformation into the Hulk and the initial incident at Culver University. The Super Soldier Serum is shown, as well as Dr. Reinstein—a pseudonym for Dr. Erskine in the comics—referenced as its inventor. In the film's deleted opening, Bruce Banner goes to the Arctic to commit suicide but transforms into the Hulk, smashing a glacier. A buried human figure and shield are visible, who are meant to be Rogers and his shield. The scene was omitted from the final film at Marvel Studios' request, as at that time they had not figured out the specifics regarding how to introduce the character into their plans for a larger shared film universe.
- In Iron Man 2 (2010), S.H.I.E.L.D. agent Phil Coulson discovers the incomplete replica of Captain America's shield inside a box. When he asks Tony Stark if he knows what it is, Tony tells him that it's "just what [he] need[s]" and places the shield underneath his particle collider to level it.
- In Spider-Man: Homecoming (2017), Happy Hogan mentions "a prototype for Cap's new shield" made by Stark Industries. Captain America wearing his Avengers-style uniform in a series of educational PSAs is shown at various points to the students of Midtown School of Science and Technology, on topics such as fitness, detention and puberty, culminating in a post-credits stinger gag showing him talking about how patience isn't always rewarded.
- In Ant-Man and the Wasp (2018), Rogers is mentioned by FBI agent Jimmy Woo and by Scott Lang.
- In Spider-Man: Far From Home (2019), Rogers, whose whereabouts are not known in the main timeline besides Sam Wilson and Bucky Barnes, is shown in a memorial slideshow alongside Stark, Romanoff, and Vision as heroes who lost their life due to the Infinity War. Additionally, Rogers is mentioned by Hogan.
- In Black Widow (2021), set during Civil War, Rogers is mentioned by Ross.
- In Eternals (2021), Sprite asks her fellow Eternals who they think will lead the Avengers now that Rogers and Stark are gone, to which Ikaris replies that he could do it.
- In Ant-Man and the Wasp: Quantumania (2023), Rogers is mentioned in Scott Lang's audiobook and by Cassie Lang who mistakes him for having fought against Scott.
- In Deadpool & Wolverine (2024), archival footage of Rogers in various battles is shown to Wade Wilson by the Time Variance Authority. Wilson later meets who he thinks is Rogers, anticipating his "Avengers, assemble!" battle cry, only to find out that the man is in fact Johnny Storm. (Note: Chris Evans portrayed this variant of Johnny Storm in Fantastic Four (2005) and Fantastic Four: Rise of the Silver Surfer (2007).) Additionally, the replica shield from Iron Man and Iron Man 2 is seen in Hogan's office.

=== Other media ===
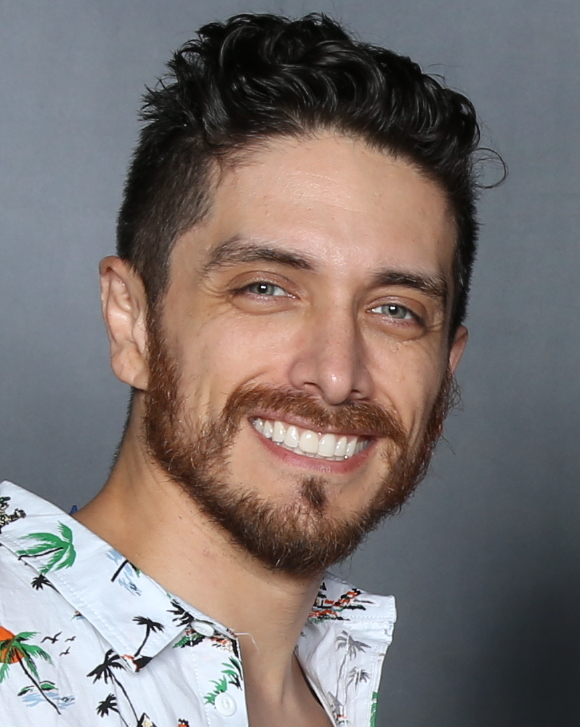
Josh Keaton voices Steve Rogers / Hydra Stomper in What If...?

- The 2013 Marvel One-Shot short film Agent Carter features the exploits of Peggy Carter one year after the events of Captain America: The First Avenger, and features a flashback of Carter's final communication with Steve Rogers. The scene was also shown in the first episode of Agent Carter.
- In The Falcon and the Winter Soldier, Rogers' speech to Wilson at the finale of Avengers: Endgame can be heard in the first episode, "New World Order". Also in this episode, Wilson struggles with taking on Rogers' title as Captain America, believing that he is not worthy of the mantle. At the Smithsonian in Washington, D.C., a museum dedication to Rogers is shown and Wilson provides them with the iconic shield for display. However, the U.S. government names John Walker their new Captain America and he is given the shield.
- In Loki, archival footage of Rogers can be seen in the episode "Glorious Purpose". In the episode "Journey into Mystery", Boastful Loki claims to have vanquished Captain America alongside the rest of the Avengers in his timeline. In the season finale, "For All Time. Always.", archival audio of Rogers from numerous films throughout the MCU can be heard during the opening logos alongside other reused audio from characters in the films.
- In She-Hulk: Attorney at Law, Rogers is mentioned frequently by Jennifer Walters, who has a crush on him and asks Banner personal questions about him in the episode "A Normal Amount of Rage". It is revealed Walters has Rogers' picture as her phone's background in the episode "Superhuman Law". Additional pictures of Rogers are seen on Walters' phone, as well as a poster for Rogers: The Musical being featured in the episode "Ribbit and Rip It".
- In The Guardians of the Galaxy Holiday Special, a cosplayer dressed up as Rogers is present at the TCL Chinese Theatre. Mantis mistakes the cosplayer as the real Rogers.

== Characterization ==
=== Outward appearance and equipment ===
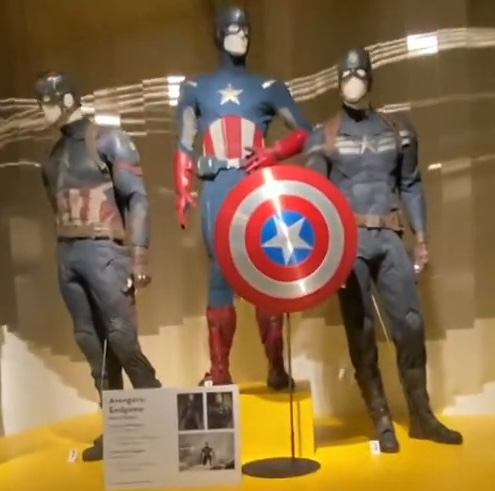
Three costumes from Avengers Endgame worn by Rogers following the timeskip in Avengers: Endgame, in The Avengers and in Captain America: The Winter Soldier respectively

Costume designer Anna B. Sheppard stated that Captain America's uniform in Captain America: The First Avenger (2011) was partly based on that of paratroopers of the era, explaining, "I think that the challenge of this costume was that it had to look 40s, that's why certain elements like using leather for the straps and belt, metal buckles and not having too tight a fit were important. Forget spandex!" Visual Development Supervisor Ryan Meinerding elaborated, "The straps that come off his chest are very similar to the ALICE webbing that was used in Vietnam. Using the straps as the stripes across his torso then seemed like an elegant design solution. In the end, the main design aspects of this suit are meant to be about making it appear soldier-like, functional and tough." In The Avengers (2012), his suit was made to look "a bit more 'superhero'" in comparison to The First Avenger, at Joss Whedon's request. Costume designer Alexandra Byrne stated the difference between both suits were "the fabrics that are available. Today we have a lot of stretch fabrics and there weren't any 'technofabrics' then", and called his design "the most technically difficult" of the Avengers' costumes.

For Captain America: The Winter Soldier (2014), Evans trained in parkour, Brazilian jiu-jitsu, karate, boxing, kickboxing, and gymnastics, as the Russo brothers believed that bringing Rogers into the modern day also meant that he had studied and mastered modern fighting styles and techniques. The filmmakers also looked to make the character's shield, which has traditionally been used for defense, a more offensive weapon. For Avengers: Age of Ultron (2015), Evans said that he was able to maintain the strength he built up for The Winter Soldier by working out up to an hour a day. Evans didn't want to take a step back from the skills shown in The Winter Soldier, and made sure Rogers' fighting style advanced, showing "a consistent display of strength" and having Rogers utilizing his environment. Evans' training regimen to get in shape for the role included weight lifting, which consisted of "the classic bodyweight and bodybuilding stuff", gymnastics and plyometrics, while staying away from cardio-based exercises, along with a high-protein diet. For Civil War, his costume in the film received "subtle changes to all the details and cut" as well as its color, becoming a combination of the stealth suit from Winter Soldier and the Avengers: Age of Ultron (2015) suit. In Avengers: Infinity War (2018), Rogers receives new vibranium gauntlets from Shuri to replace his traditional shield.

In his civilian attire throughout the series, it has been noted that Rogers "tends to go for a very low key look ... based around very simple pieces that work together". In his earliest appearance, designed by Sheppard, "post-serum Steve was All-American in a devastatingly tight white tee and khaki pants", while in The Avengers Byrne made him "sophisticated enough to beautifully blend plaids and stripes." Costume designer Judianna Makovsky described his fashion evolution between Winter Soldier and Captain America: Civil War (2016) as becoming increasingly comfortable in his clothes. A New York magazine article, however, criticized his clothing across the series as being "bereft of patterns, graphics, imagery or anything you couldn't color in with one singular crayon".

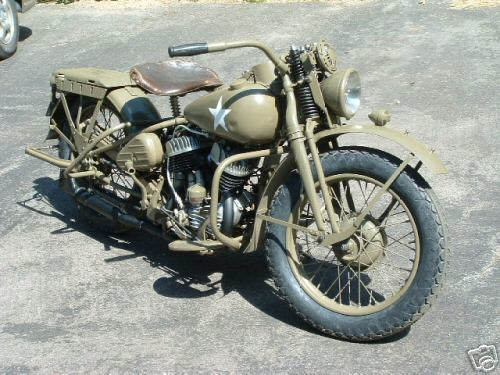
A restored Harley-Davidson WLA

In The First Avenger, Rogers uses a weaponized 1942 WLA motorcycle in World War II in his fights against Hydra. In Captain America: The Winter Soldier and The Falcon and the Winter Soldier, this model is shown to be displayed in the Captain America exhibit in the Smithsonian Air and Space Museum. In The Avengers (2012), Rogers is shown to have switched to a Softail Slim model for commuting around New York City, before using the Street 750 model when fleeing from pursuing Hydra agents in The Winter Soldier. Rogers later uses other models such as the Breakout, V-Rod and the Softail Slim S.

=== Personality ===
In Captain America: The First Avenger (2011), Steve Rogers begins as a frail, sickly young man who is enhanced to the peak of human ability by an experimental serum in order to aid the United States in World War II. Regarding the extent of the character's abilities Evans remarked, "He would crush the Olympics. Any Olympic sport he's gonna dominate. He can jump higher, run faster, lift stronger weight, but he can be injured. He could roll an ankle and be out for the season. He's not perfect, he's not untouchable. So a lot of the effects, if I'm going to punch someone they're not going to put them on a cable and fly them back 50 feet, but he's going to go down, probably not getting back up, which I think humanizes it. It makes it something that, again, I think everyone can relate to a little bit more, which I really like."

Evans said that Rogers is much darker in The Avengers (2012): "It's just about him trying to come to terms with the modern world. You've got to imagine, it's enough of a shock to accept the fact that you're in a completely different time, but everybody you know is dead. Everybody you cared about ... He was a soldier, obviously, everybody he went to battle with, all of his brothers in arms, they're all dead. He's just lonely. I think in the beginning it's a fish-out-of-water scene, and it's tough. It's a tough pill for him to swallow. Then comes trying to find a balance with the modern world." Regarding the dynamic between Rogers and Tony Stark, Evans said, "I think there's certainly a dichotomy—this kind of friction between myself and Tony Stark, they're polar opposites. One guy is flash and spotlight and smooth, and the other guy is selfless and in the shadows and kind of quiet and they have to get along. They explore that, and it's pretty fun." A key moment in The Avengers occurs when Stark, who had been dismissive of Rogers at earlier points in the film, defers to Rogers as leader of the newly formed team to defend New York against a large-scale attack. Describing his character's continuing adjustment to the modern world in Captain America: The Winter Soldier (2014), Evans said, "It's not so much about his shock with [technology]... It's more about the societal differences. He's gone from the '40s to today; he comes from a world where people were a little more trusting, the threats not as deep. Now, it's harder to tell who's right and wrong. Actions you take to protect people from threats could compromise liberties and privacy. That's tough for Steve to swallow."

In his next appearance, in Avengers: Age of Ultron (2015), Rogers is the leader of the Avengers. Evans stated that since the fall of S.H.I.E.L.D., Rogers has been left to depend on his Avenger teammates without the structure of military life and is now "looking to understand where he belongs, not just as a soldier, as Captain America, but as Steve Rogers, as a person." In Captain America: Civil War (2016), Rogers becomes the leader of a faction of the Avengers against regulation. Director Anthony Russo described Captain America's character arc in the film as taking him "from the most ra-ra company man" and "a somewhat willing propagandist" to "an insurgent" at the end of the film. Unlike the comics' Civil War, the film was never going to kill Rogers, as the directors thought that was "an easy ending ... The more difficult and more interesting place to leave a family fight is: can these important relationships ever be repaired? Is this family broken permanently?"

Director Joe Russo said that after the events of Civil War, Rogers struggles with the conflict between his responsibility to himself and his responsibility to others. In Avengers: Infinity War (2018), the character embodies the "spirit" of his comic alternate identity Nomad in the film. An early draft of the film experimented with Rogers first appearing in the film saving Vision from Corvus Glaive during the third act. Markus and McFeely said they were called "insane" for waiting that long to introduce Rogers into the film and ultimately conceded it was "not [a] satisfying" approach.

In Avengers: Endgame (2019), Christopher Markus described Rogers as someone who is "moving toward some sort of enlightened self-interest." McFeely knew Rogers "was going to get his dance" he promised Peggy Carter in The First Avenger. He initially planned to complete Rogers's story arc by killing him off, given the character's elongated life for his occupation, before deciding to have Rogers abandoned his shield.

== Differences from the comic books ==
The origin story of Captain America follows that of the comic books, particularly Ultimate Marvel for certain elements like growing up in Brooklyn and Bucky being a childhood best friend rather than being met later, but diverges from there. Rogers is also a founding Avenger, unlike in the comics where he is a later addition to the roster and the formed Avengers are the ones who thaw him out of the ice. In the comic books, Steve Rogers is murdered at the event of the Civil War storyline, leading to Bucky Barnes becoming the next Captain America. In the MCU, Rogers survives Civil War, eventually passing the mantle of Captain America to Sam Wilson in Avengers: Endgame. In the comics, Wilson became Captain America in 2014 after Rogers' aging accelerated to be the real age of 90.

== Reception ==
Evans' portrayal of the character has been positively received by fans and critics. Roger Moore of the Orlando Sentinel positively reviewed Evans' performance as Steve Rogers, writing that Evans "brings a proper earnestness to the character". Roger Ebert described the character as "a hero we care about and who has some dimension". Likewise, in his review of Avengers: Endgame, Joe Morgenstern of The Wall Street Journal lauded both actor and character, calling "Chris Evans's effortlessly likable Steve Rogers/Captain America, the team's natural leader."

Peter DeBruge, writing for Variety, had a more critical take, finding that "as Marvel heroes go, Captain America must be the most vanilla of the lot", and that because of his quick healing and fighting abilities, "there's never the slightest concern that the Nazis might get the better of him". In 2015, Empire named Captain America the 46th greatest film character of all time. In a December 2017 interview with Vanity Fair, Marvel Studios president Kevin Feige called Evans "a great actor" and "a reluctant star". He compared his portrayal of Captain America with Christopher Reeve's Superman for the strong association between the actors and their respective characters.

Rogers's catchphrase is "I can do this all day", first said in Captain America: The First Avenger when he, before becoming Captain America, stands up to a bully. Rogers repeats this line in Captain America: Civil War and Avengers: Endgame. According to Salon, the line is "iconic and oft-quoted". The Washington Post considered it among the franchise's "most memorable and effective lines". Entertainment Weekly called it one of the MCU's "best one-liners". Film journal Cinephile cited the phrase as an indicator of the character's "heroic fortitude and resilience" and "moral character".

Rogers' elderly appearance at the end of Avengers: Endgame has been noted to resemble Joe Biden, which Evans acknowledged. His quote "No, I don't think I will" has also become the subject of several Internet memes.

=== Accolades ===
Year	Film	Award	Category	Result	Ref(s)
2011	Captain America: The First Avenger	Teen Choice Awards	Choice Summer Movie Star: Male	Nominated	
2011	Captain America: The First Avenger	Scream Awards	Best Science Fiction Actor	Nominated	
2011	Captain America: The First Avenger	Scream Awards	Best Superhero	Won	
2011	Captain America: The First Avenger	Scream Awards	Fight Scene of the Year (with Hugo Weaving)	Nominated	
2012	Captain America: The First Avenger	People's Choice Awards	Favorite Movie Superhero	Nominated	
2012	Captain America: The First Avenger	MTV Movie Awards	Best Hero	Nominated	
2012	Captain America: The First Avenger	Saturn Awards	Best Actor	Nominated	
2012	The Avengers	Teen Choice Awards	Choice Movie: Male Scene Stealer: Male	Nominated	
2013	The Avengers	People's Choice Awards	Favorite Action Movie Star	Nominated	
2013	The Avengers	People's Choice Awards	Favorite Movie Superhero	Nominated	
2013	The Avengers	MTV Movie Awards	Best Fight (with cast)	Won	
2014	Captain America: The Winter Soldier	Teen Choice Awards	Choice Movie Actor: Sci-Fi/Fantasy	Nominated	
2014	Captain America: The Winter Soldier	Teen Choice Awards	Choice Movie: Chemistry (with Anthony Mackie)	Nominated	
2014	Captain America: The Winter Soldier	Teen Choice Awards	Choice Movie: Liplock (with Scarlett Johansson)	Nominated	
2014	Captain America: The Winter Soldier	Young Hollywood Awards	Super Superhero	Nominated	
2015	Captain America: The Winter Soldier	Critics' Choice Awards	Best Actor in an Action Movie	Nominated	
2015	Captain America: The Winter Soldier	People's Choice Awards	Favorite Movie Duo (with Scarlett Johansson)	Nominated	
2015	Captain America: The Winter Soldier	People's Choice Awards	Favorite Action Movie Actor	Won	
2015	Captain America: The Winter Soldier	Kids' Choice Awards	Favorite Male Action Star	Nominated	
2015	Captain America: The Winter Soldier	Saturn Awards	Best Actor	Nominated	
2015	Captain America: The Winter Soldier	MTV Movie Awards	Best Fight (with Sebastian Stan)	Nominated	
2015	Captain America: The Winter Soldier	MTV Movie Awards	Best Kiss (with Scarlett Johansson)	Nominated	
2015	Avengers: Age of Ultron	Teen Choice Awards	Choice Movie Scene Stealer	Won	
2016	Avengers: Age of Ultron	Kids' Choice Awards	Favorite Movie Actor	Nominated	
2016	Avengers: Age of Ultron	MTV Movie Awards	Best Hero	Nominated	
2016	Captain America: Civil War	Teen Choice Awards	Choice Movie Actor: Sci-Fi/Fantasy	Won	
2016	Captain America: Civil War	Teen Choice Awards	Choice Movie: Chemistry (with cast)	Nominated	
2016	Captain America: Civil War	Teen Choice Awards	Choice Movie: Liplock (with Emily VanCamp)	Nominated	
2016	Captain America: Civil War	Critics' Choice Awards	Best Actor in an Action Movie	Nominated	
2017	Captain America: Civil War	People's Choice Awards	Favorite Action Movie Actor	Nominated	
2017	Captain America: Civil War	Kids' Choice Awards	Favorite Movie Actor	Nominated	
2017	Captain America: Civil War	Kids' Choice Awards	Favorite Butt-Kicker	Won	
2017	Captain America: Civil War	Kids' Choice Awards	Favorite Frenemies (with Robert Downey Jr.)	Nominated	
2017	Captain America: Civil War	Kids' Choice Awards	#Squad (with cast)	Nominated	
2017	Captain America: Civil War	Saturn Awards	Best Actor	Nominated	
2018	Avengers: Infinity War	Teen Choice Awards	Choice Action Movie Actor	Nominated	
2019	Avengers: Infinity War	Kids' Choice Awards	Favorite Movie Actor	Nominated	
2019	Avengers: Infinity War	Kids' Choice Awards	Favorite Superhero	Nominated	
2019	Avengers: Endgame	MTV Movie & TV Awards	Best Fight (with Josh Brolin)	Nominated	
2019	Avengers: Endgame	Teen Choice Awards	Choice Action Movie Actor	Nominated	
2019	Avengers: Endgame	Saturn Awards	Best Actor	Nominated	
2019	Avengers: Endgame	People's Choice Awards	Action Movie Star of 2019	Nominated	
2020	Avengers: Endgame	Kids' Choice Awards	Favorite Movie Actor	Nominated	

== See also ==
- Captain America in other media
- Characters of the Marvel Cinematic Universe
