= Shuri (Marvel Cinematic Universe) =

Marvel Cinematic Universe character

- Marvel Cinematic Universe character
- Letitia Wright as Shuri / Black Panther in a promotional character poster for Black Panther: Wakanda Forever (2022)
- First appearance: Black Panther (2018)
- Based on: Shuri by: Reginald Hudlin; John Romita Jr.
- Adapted by: Ryan Coogler; Joe Robert Cole
- Portrayed by: Letitia Wright
- Voiced by: Ozioma Akagha (What If...?)

In-universe information
- Titles: Princess of Wakanda; Black Panther
- Occupation: Scientist
- Affiliation: Dora Milaje; Midnight Angels
- Weapon: Vibranium Black Panther suit and retractable claws; Vibranium gauntlets
- Family: T'Chaka (father); Ramonda (mother); T'Challa (brother)
- Relatives: N'Jobu (uncle); N'Jadaka / Erik "Killmonger" Stevens (cousin); Toussaint / T'Challa II (nephew)
- Home: Wakanda
- Nationality: Wakandan

Shuri is a fictional character portrayed primarily by Letitia Wright in the Marvel Cinematic Universe (MCU) media franchise, based on the Marvel Comics character of the same name. She is portrayed as the tech-savvy genius younger sister of T'Challa and the princess of Wakanda.

Following her father's death, Shuri assists her brother in reclaiming the Wakandan throne from their cousin Killmonger. She later assists the Avengers by attempting to use her technology to safely remove the Mind Stone from Vision's head. She falls victim to the Blip but is later restored to life and joins the Avengers in a battle against Thanos. Following her brother and mother's death, Shuri takes up her brother's Black Panther mantle to defeat Namor.

Wright has appeared as Shuri in the films Black Panther (2018), Avengers: Infinity War (2018), Avengers: Endgame (2019) and Black Panther: Wakanda Forever (2022). Her portrayal has received a positive reception. Alternate versions of the character appear in the animated series What If...? (2021), voiced by Ozioma Akagha.

== Fictional character biography ==
=== Helping T'Challa and Bucky Barnes ===
In 2016, with Shuri's father T'Chaka having died, (Note: As depicted in the 2016 film Captain America: Civil War.) her brother T'Challa assumes the Wakandan throne. She attends his coronation ceremony with her mother Ramonda. At the ceremony, the Jabari Tribe's leader M'Baku challenges T'Challa for the crown in ritual combat, and mocks him for his use of Shuri's technology. Although M'Baku initially has the upper hand, T'Challa defeats M'Baku and persuades him to yield rather than die. After Ulysses Klaue and his accomplice Erik "Killmonger" Stevens steal a Wakandan artifact from a London museum, T'Challa, Okoye, and Nakia travel to Busan, South Korea, with Shuri providing T'Challa with a new vibration-absorbent Black Panther suit. Shuri partakes in the ensuing car chase via hologram. After Everett K. Ross is gravely injured protecting Nakia, T'Challa takes Ross to Wakanda, where Shuri heals Ross using vibranium technology.

Nakia, Shuri, Ramonda, and Ross later flee to the Jabari Tribe for aid after Erik Stevens, revealed to be T'Challa and Shuri's cousin N'Jadaka, seizes the Wakandan throne and hurls T'Challa off a waterfall, presumably to his death. They find a comatose T'Challa, rescued by the Jabari in repayment for sparing M'Baku's life. Healed by a heart-shaped herb that Nakia stole, T'Challa returns to fight N'Jadaka and defeats him after Shuri initiates a maglev train, de-powering N'Jadaka's Black Panther suit. After killing N'Jadaka, T'Challa establishes an outreach center in California at the building where N'Jadaka's father N'Jobu died, to be run by Nakia and Shuri.

Shuri also helps Bucky Barnes with his recovery from Hydra brainwashing, dubbing him the 'White Wolf'.

=== Infinity War and resurrection ===
In 2018, Shuri is informed by T'Challa of her help needed and meets Steve Rogers, Bruce Banner, Natasha Romanoff, and Wanda Maximoff at the medical center, who ask her to safely remove the Mind Stone from Vision. Shuri begins work, while being protected by Maximoff. However, as the battle proceeds on the fields, Maximoff leaves her post, which inadvertently allows Corvus Glaive to infiltrate the medical center, preventing her from finishing her work. Moments later, the Blip happens and Shuri disintegrates.

In 2023, Shuri is restored to life and is brought via portal by the Masters of the Mystic Arts to the destroyed Avengers Compound to join the battle against an alternate Thanos and his army. Afterwards, she returns home and reunites with her mother. A week later, she attends Tony Stark's funeral with her brother and Okoye.

=== Becoming Black Panther and facing Namor ===
In 2024, Shuri tries to synthetically recreate the heart-shaped herb in her lab but T'Challa passes away. She, alongside her mother, attend the funeral ceremony.

In 2025, Shuri accompanies her mother to burn the outfits they wore to the funeral, signifying the end of the period of mourning. Shuri refuses to burn the outfit, as she is still grieving. The two then encounter Namor, a mutant with wings on his ankles, who has bypassed Wakanda's advanced security systems to their shock. He reveals that the CIA has used a Vibranium detecting machine to locate Vibranium underwater. Namor holds Wakanda responsible for the Vibranium race and offers them an ultimatum: find the scientist who made the machine and bring them to him, or he will wage war on Wakanda. Shuri and Okoye travel to Alexandria, Virginia and find Ross, who tells him where to go to find answers. They go to Cambridge, Massachusetts to meet the creator of the machine, MIT student Riri Williams. Shuri infiltrates the university and meets Williams in her dormitory. Williams is initially reluctant to go with them but eventually agrees. They go to Williams' garage, where Shuri recognizes Stark Industries type equipment and asks Williams about it. However, the FBI arrives, forcing Shuri to take a motorcycle to escape. She regroups with Okoye and Williams but are ambushed by Namor's warriors, who take Shuri and Williams underwater to meet Namor.

Namor shows Shuri around the undersea kingdom of Talokan, which he has guarded for centuries and is rich in Vibranium. Bitter at the surface world that once rejected him, Namor offers an alliance with Wakanda against the rest of the world but promises to destroy Wakanda first if they refuse. Nakia infiltrates Talokan to rescue Shuri and Williams, and Namor retaliates with an attack against the capital of Wakanda, flooding the city. During the attack, Ramonda drowns after saving Williams from the water. Namor vows to return in a week, and the citizens of Wakanda evacuate to the Jabari Land.

Shuri, using a remnant of the herb that gave Namor's people their underwater abilities, synthetically reconstructs the heart-shaped herb. After ingesting the herb, she is transported to the ancestral plane, where she sees Killmonger, who urges her to kill Namor as revenge for her mother's death. Upon waking up, Shuri discovers she has gained the powers of the Black Panther, and travels to the Jabari Land to meet with the tribes of Wakanda, who accept her as their new protector. M'Baku tries to persuade Shuri to seek a peaceful resolution to the conflict, but she does not listen and orders an immediate counter-attack on Namor.

The Wakandans, on their Sea Leopard vessel, set a trap for Namor, luring him and his warriors to the surface off the coast of Africa in the Atlantic Ocean, and a battle ensues. Shuri separates Namor from the rest of his people, intending to dry him out and weaken him. The pair crash on a desert beach and fight. Shuri eventually gains the upper hand, but spares Namor's life, offering him a peaceful alliance. Namor accepts and his warriors retreat.

Back in Wakanda, Shuri says goodbye to Williams and forfeits her claim to the throne by declining the expectant succession duel and allowing M'Baku to attend for his own claim unopposed by herself.

Instead, Shuri, remaining the Black Panther in a separate position, decides to leave Wakanda. She visits Nakia in Haiti and burns her funeral clothes in Nakia's backyard. She then learns that Nakia and T'Challa have a son, Toussaint, who Nakia has been raising in secret, and Toussaint reveals that his Wakandan name is T'Challa.

== Alternate versions ==
Several alternate versions of Shuri appear in the animated series What If...?, in which she is voiced by Ozioma Akagha.

- In an alternate 2008, Shuri is present when her long-lost older brother, Star-Lord T'Challa, returns to Wakanda from outer space with the Ravagers.
- In an alternate 2010, Killmonger murders T'Challa and engineers an American invasion of Wakanda using "Stark Liberator" drone, which Killmonger then defeats, manipulating king T'Chaka into making him the next Black Panther. Shuri is able to see through this deception and brings evidence of it to Pepper Potts before attempting to arrest Killmonger with Potts and the Dora Milaje. However, when they arrive, they find him gone.

== Concept and creation ==
Created by the writer Reginald Hudlin and artist John Romita Jr., Shuri first appeared in Black Panther (Vol. 4) No. 2 (May 2005). The character, originally written as a princess of Wakanda and a supporting character, trains to and eventually succeeds her older brother T'Challa, becoming the Black Panther and ruler of Wakanda in her own right. In 2018, Marvel published her first vital solo series titled SHURI, written by Nnedi Okorafor, a coming of age story which focused on Shuri dealing with her brother being absent from the throne while exploring her leadership and interests.

Actor Donald Glover and his brother Stephen made some minor contributions to an early draft of the script for Shuri's debut film feature Black Panther, developing the sibling relationship between T'Challa and Shuri. The James Bond character Q was a key influence on the development of Shuri during the writing phase of Black Panther, with director Ryan Coogler saying:

"Going through the process of writing the film and working with my co-writer, Joe Robert Cole, I thought Shuri would be a really cool Q. It'd be really interesting seeing a young African teenager who's manipulated this element [vibranium] in ways that nobody else could and who's confident and able to have their own space. In our minds, Wakanda's a place that looks at age differently than other places... I also thought that as we were writing, I realized that the more stuff we can put in this relationship between T'Challa and his sister, the better off we'll be... Their relationship is built on love, and out of that, so many other things grew. She became so much more than just a Q."

In October 2016, actress Letitia Wright was announced to have joined the cast of Black Panther in an unknown role. For the role, Wright "watched YouTube videos of real African princesses" and sought to emulate the idea of "normal girls who happen to be royalty" in her depiction of Shuri. Discussing the film's potential to inspire, Wright said they "went in with the attitude of just telling the truth of the story, taking inspiration from different parts of African countries, whether it's the Zulu tribe or the Ashanti tribe, anywhere we could find true depictions of queens and kings in Africa itself."

In November 2018, Wright was confirmed to be reprising her role as Shuri in the sequel. On August 28, 2020, lead actor Chadwick Boseman died after a four-year battle with colon cancer, and Kevin Feige later confirmed that the role would not be recast, feeling Boseman's portrayal "transcended any previous iteration of the character in Marvel's past." Screenwriter Joe Robert Cole recalled that after Boseman's death, Nakia and M'Baku were considered to assume the Black Panther mantle before they settled on Shuri, who he defined as an easier choice given the character becomes Black Panther in the comics. Coogler always intended to have Shuri eventually take the Black Panther mantle, but it would be "done in a different way where her brother was gonna be alongside her, really explore that, like the comic books, the ways in which T'Challa and Shuri would be Black Panther alongside each other and try to figure out how to defend their nation." When Coogler first told Wright that she would be the new lead of the franchise, the latter was bitter for it being different from how she expected and felt there was an obstacle of "the impostor syndrome that I felt while doing it." She credited the encouragement of Coogler, costar Danai Gurira, and the rest of the cast with aiding the transition. Wright, then "dealing with the emotions of grieving and loss", tapped into those feelings to bring authenticity to Shuri's portrayal in Wakanda Forever, citing both the character and herself as "going through the same journey."

The original iteration of the sequel's script, which focused on T'Challa grieving the time he lost after disintegrating, featured Namor as the antagonist. After Boseman's death, the script changed to focus on the dynamic between Namor and Shuri. According to Michael P. Shawver, there were scenes that hinted at a romantic attraction between Shuri and Namor but they were cut due to filmmakers believing they would jeopardize the plot: "But then you've got to watch out for portraying, for example, Shuri flirting to get what she wants as opposed to being a diplomatic leader and becoming the leader that she needs to be, that she'll get to at the end." Marvel Studios officially remained silent on Shuri's ascension to Black Panther before the release of the film, though the studio alluded to the development with "merchandising designs to posters that provide plenty of hints, to footage shown in trailers and TV spots".

== Characterization ==
=== Personality and intelligence ===
Shuri is pretty smart, but she's really relatable as well, so she's not this super-intelligent person who nobody can really connect with and everybody feels like, 'aw, you're too intelligent to be my friend.' Shuri is super cool and ultra amazing, and her mind is her weapon. She uses that to create amazing technology, but then she's able to turn around and tease her brother, so she's still able to be a relatable, down-to-earth character who everybody can vibe with.

— Letitia Wright on Shuri's intelligence

In Black Panther, Shuri is portrayed as T'Challa's 18-year-old sister who designs new technology for her country of Wakanda. Letitia Wright described Shuri as innovative of spirit and mind, wanting to take Wakanda to "a new place", and felt she was a good role model for young black girls. The film's executive producer Nate Moore called Shuri the smartest person in the world, even more so than Tony Stark. The Russo brothers, directors of Avengers: Infinity War and Avengers: Endgame, agreed with the interpretation of her as the smartest character.

Letitia Wright described Shuri's intelligence as "really cool", explaining: "Because, you know, we sometimes — when we see people who are 'super intelligent' and 'super smart', they don't really look like me." She further added, "[for] Marvel to be behind it and to be brave enough to say, 'She is the smartest girl in the universe – in the Marvel Universe' and 'Yes, she's younger than everyone'... Her and Peter Parker are pretty much the smartest kids on the block.'" In another interview, addressing Shuri as an inspiration for young people, she explained that "Tony and Banner are great, not only as actors but in the films themselves. They're amazing, iconic characters, so to be able to be on par with them... and that's not even something I said! I didn't say that, the head of Marvel said that, and it kind of created a chain reaction. And Nate Moore said those things, so talk to those guys! They felt really strongly that Shuri was the smartest person in the universe, and I'm not going to downplay that. Young people are the future, so it's only right to allow that to be the thing that's being said online."

Coogler called Black Panther: Wakanda Forever "a mother-daughter movie" with Ramonda trying to impart Shuri with the lesson that over the course of a long life, she is "going to have to grieve things, she's gonna lose things, and she can't allow that to change her, she can't allow that to shut her down." Coogler adds that for them, the film "was a test of did Shuri learn the lessons that her parents were trying to teach her? And how do you know if she learned the lessons?" Wright described Shuri as burying "herself in her technology" while grieving her brother amid the time she spent in her laboratory and commented that a young black woman who is both a princess and scientist has never been explored before on such a "major scale" before. Renaldo Matadeen cites her death by Thanos right as she and T'Challa "were recovering and forging a future" as being the result of outsiders meddling and given that this is followed soon after by "her brother's tragedy, it's understandable she'd resent the outside world, especially one that keeps seeing Wakanda as a threat or a convenient ally." Scott Thomas declared that "Shuri's story illuminates how having faith means absconding from what we want faith to yield to us" when institutions keep science and faith apart and that believing "too strongly that something is meant to be (to try and right what's already happened) is the fastest path to vengeance and an unrighteous life." Joshua Fox compares Shuri's arc to Killmonger's "in that her anger and need for vengeance were corrupting her and made her no better than the people she wanted to take down", viewing her journey in the sequel as "a reflection of Killmonger's path of rage-fueled vengeance".

==== Relationship with Namor ====
Meredith Loftus notes the many similarities between Shuri and Namor, as both "were born and raised in a land separate from the full devastation of colonialism", are very proud of their homelands, serve as leaders who want to protect their people, and are "broken people." William Goodman observes that Shuri is "keen to set Namor's ablaze" and with the film hinting at "even a slight possibility of Shuri giving into her anger makes it one of the more radically compelling emotional arcs of the Marvel Cinematic Universe to date". Miles Surrey equates Shuri's arc in Wakanda Forever with that of her brother in Civil War and the original Black Panther film: "By crossing paths with Namor, who holds contempt for the surface world because it forced his Mayan ancestors to retreat to the oceans, Shuri is facing her own equivalent to Killmonger: an antagonist whose motivations are understandable, and who represents the temptation to allow anger to dictate your decisions."

=== Appearance and technology ===
Black Panther costume designer Ruth E. Carter included an Adinkra symbol representing purpose on one of Shuri's shirts, similar to a Waawa motif, explaining that Shuri "certainly has a purpose in Wakanda". Shuri's artificial intelligence 'Griot' was voiced by Trevor Noah, with the name 'Griot' being a West African term for a historian or storyteller.

For Wakanda Forever, Carter and others working on the sequel wanted clothing with "somber color palette to bring more of the attention to the emotions of the scenes". Carter noted that the grays and purple on Shuri's tracksuit were a homage to the royal color but were "more of a muted purple with some blue in it." Shuri dons a Black Panther suit for her final battle with Namor. Head of Visual Development for Marvel Studios Ryan Meinerding notes that Shuri's suit "is kind of a combination between T'Challa's suit and Killmonger's suit. A mix of the silver and the gold. That's the Panther she needed to become in order to fight Namor at the end." Carter added that Shuri's Black Panther suit was designed "to delicately enhance the dynamic figure of the panther suit" with more adornments than T'Challa's and viewed their inclusion and focus as giving the suit its femininity and not straying "too far away from her form, the silhouette of a woman, with a bust and hips and shoulders."

== Reception ==
=== Critical response and analysis ===
Reviews initially were positive of the character and the character's potential for the future, being described as a "fan-favorite". Jacob Stolworthy of British publication The Independent praised the character, describing her as "one of Black Panther's biggest revelations". Manhola Dargis of the New York Times, meanwhile, when reviewing Black Panther, praised Shuri as part of "a phalanx of women... who cushion [T'Challa] in maternal, military, sisterly and scientific support", describing Wright's performance as "vivacious" and likening Shuri to "Bond's gadget guy [Q]". Dave Trumbore of Collider and Caroline Framke of Vox also likened her relationship with T'Challa to what Q is to James Bond. Her mocking of Everett K. Ross as a "broken white boy" was particularly positively received in media commentary. Shuri's delivery of the line "What are those?" in the film, a usage of a popular 2015 Internet meme, was also positively received, although the meme's creator Brian 'Brusco' Moore commented negatively on the renewed attention to the meme. Caroline Framke of Vox, meanwhile, praised the depiction of Shuri as "the best part" of Black Panther, noting her "elastic, game-for-anything energy" and citing her as "the feisty Disney princess we need and deserve". Both Leah Greenblatt of Entertainment Weekly and Sam Sewell-Peterson singled out Wright and Gurira for praise, with Greenblatt writing that the pair felt the most "like they could easily hold their own films."

The author of Dear Martin and chosen author for Scholastic Corporation's novel adaption of Shuri in the young adult fiction novel Shuri: A Black Panther Novel, Nic Stone, praised the film version of the character claiming "I fell hard for the witty STEM genius girl who totally stole the whole show". Having been labeled as the MCU's smartest character, it is often debated in media whether she or Tony Stark is smarter.

Wright's portrayal of Shuri in Wakanda Forever, in which she succeeds her brother as Black Panther, was mostly well-received. Lauding the cast, A. O. Scott of The New York Times wrote, "Bassett, Wright, Gurira, Williams and Coel — rejoined by Lupita Nyong'o as Nakia, who shows up a bit late in the action — form the kind of fractious, formidable ensemble that should be a franchise in its own right." Empire praised Wright as finding "compelling volatility for Shuri to take the spotlight"; Forbes noted Wright's "multilayered, conflicted characterization is as full an emotional journey as any we've seen in Marvel's expansive universe of heroes" with a slow transformation from reactive to "more determined and proactive"; The Harvard Crimson writer Kieran J. Farrell observes that while Wakanda Forever "does become rather bloated at points, the completion of Shuri's journey is executed extremely well in the end, which is undoubtedly most important"; Ross Bonaime of Collider wrote that Wakanda Forever was by and large "Wright's film, as the weight of her responsibilities grows, while she still attempts to ignore her heartbreak" and lauded the actress as beautifully personifying "the pain, frustration, rage, and fear that this film inherently has about having to say goodbye". However, some commentators were not receptive to Shuri's ascended role, with Eric Webb admitting that Wright "gives Shuri new depth, but the role of protagonist never quite clicks", and Evan Dondlinger of The Daily Nebraskan lamenting that Wright "simply just doesn't have the star power to propel this series forward as it's [sic] new protagonist, which is neither her fault nor the filmmaker's."

=== Awards and nominations ===
Letitia Wright received various accolades and nominations for her portrayal of Shuri in Black Panther.

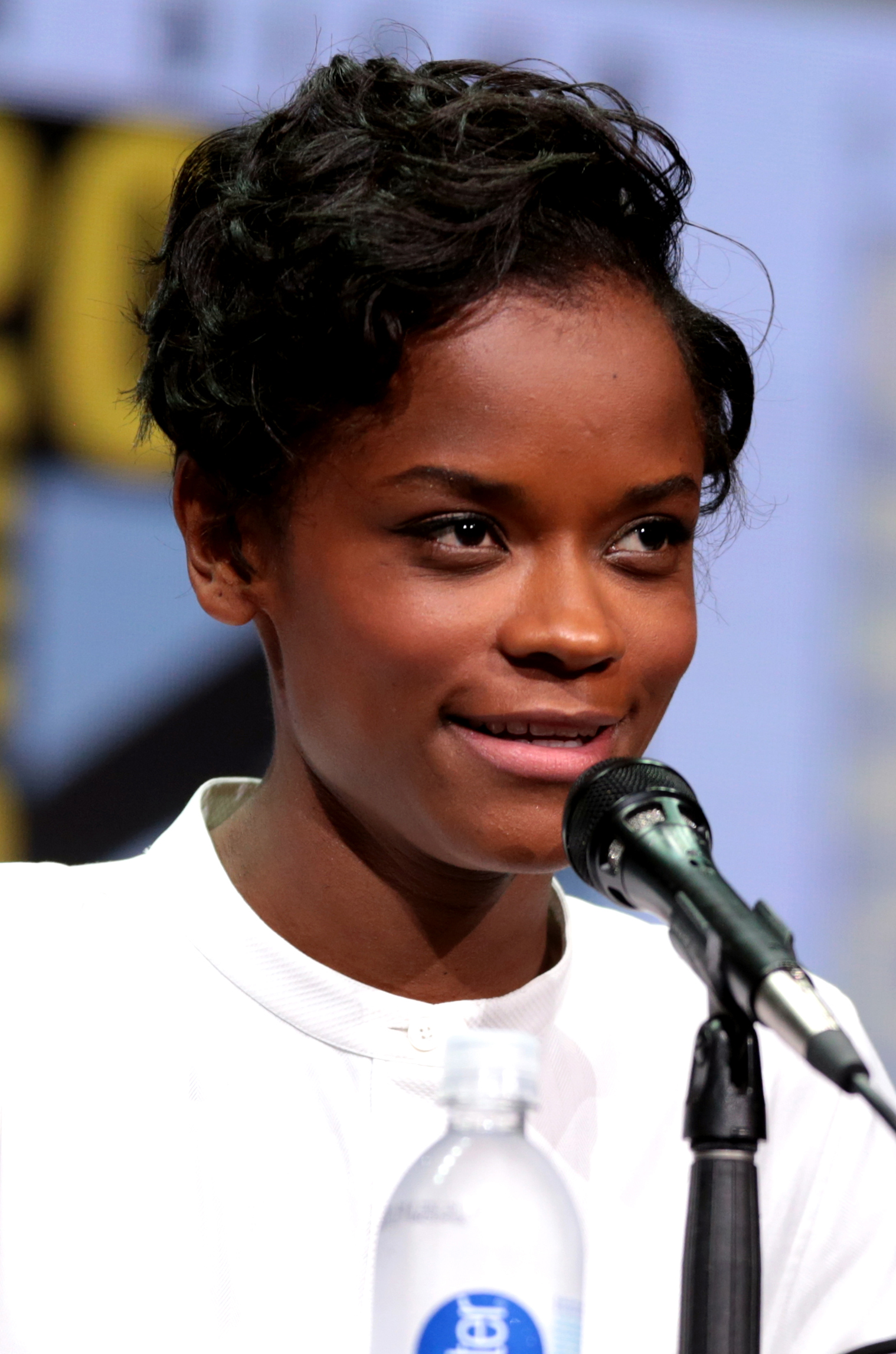
Letitia Wright at the 2017 San Diego Comic-Con

Year	Award	Category	Work	Result	Ref.
2018	Saturn Awards	Best Performance by a Younger Actor	Black Panther	Nominated	
2018	MTV Movie & TV Awards	Best On-Screen Team	Black Panther	Nominated	
2018	MTV Movie & TV Awards	Scene Stealer	Black Panther	Nominated	
2018	Teen Choice Awards	Choice Sci-Fi Movie Actress	Black Panther	Won	
2018	Teen Choice Awards	Choice Breakout Movie Star	Black Panther	Nominated	
2019	Black Reel Awards	Best Supporting Actress	Black Panther	Nominated	
2019	Black Reel Awards	Best Breakthrough Performance, Female	Black Panther	Won	
2019	NAACP Image Awards	Outstanding Breakthrough Performance in a Motion Picture	Black Panther	Won	
2019	NAACP Image Awards	Outstanding Supporting Actress in a Motion Picture	Black Panther	Nominated	
2019	Screen Actors Guild Awards	Outstanding Performance by a Cast in a Motion Picture	Black Panther	Won	
2023	NAACP Image Awards	Outstanding Actress in a Motion Picture	Black Panther: Wakanda Forever	Nominated	
2023	Black Reel Awards	Outstanding Actress	Black Panther: Wakanda Forever	Nominated	
2023	Kids' Choice Awards	Favorite Movie Actress	Black Panther: Wakanda Forever	Nominated	
2023	Critics' Choice Super Awards	Best Actress in a Superhero Movie	Black Panther: Wakanda Forever	Nominated	

== In other media ==
The book Wakanda Files: A Technological Exploration of the Avengers and Beyond focuses on the Avengers from Shuri's perspective, referencing the events of the films and the television series Agents of S.H.I.E.L.D..

== See also ==
- Characters of the Marvel Cinematic Universe
