= T'Challa (Marvel Cinematic Universe) =

Character in the Marvel Cinematic Universe

- Marvel Cinematic Universe character
- Chadwick Boseman as T'Challa / Black Panther in Black Panther (2018).
- First appearance: Captain America: Civil War (2016)
- Last appearance: Avengers: Endgame (2019)
- Based on: Black Panther by: Stan Lee; Jack Kirby
- Adapted by: Christopher Markus; Stephen McFeely
- Portrayed by: Chadwick Boseman

In-universe information
- Titles: King of Wakanda; Prince of Wakanda (formerly); Black Panther
- Affiliation: Avengers; Dora Milaje; Wakandan army
- Weapon: Vibranium Black Panther suit and retractable claws
- Family: T'Chaka (father); Ramonda (mother); Shuri (sister)
- Significant other: Nakia
- Children: Toussaint / T'Challa II (son)
- Relatives: N'Jobu (uncle); N'Jadaka / Erik "Killmonger" Stevens (cousin)
- Origin: Wakanda
- Nationality: Wakandan

T'Challa is a fictional character portrayed by Chadwick Boseman in the Marvel Cinematic Universe (MCU) media franchise—based on the Marvel Comics character of the same name. He is initially depicted as the prince of the fictional African nation of Wakanda who holds the appointed title of Black Panther. He uses an advanced vibranium suit and is imbued with superhuman strength and agility granted to him by the heart-shaped herb, as a blessing bestowed upon him by Wakanda's patron deity Bast, from whom the visage of the Black Panther mantle assumed by the chosen royal members is representative and evocative of.

After the murder of his father T'Chaka, T'Challa becomes king and finds himself in the midst of a conflict between the Avengers. After discovering the culprit was Helmut Zemo, T'Challa subdues him. He comes into conflict with his cousin Erik Stevens who usurps the throne, but eventually wins it back and thwarts Stevens' attempt to use Wakanda's vast technological resources to conquer the world. T'Challa has a son with Nakia and during the conflict against Thanos, leads the Wakandan armies alongside the Avengers, but falls victim to the Blip. After being restored to life by the Avengers, he joins them in a final and victorious battle against Thanos before rejoining his family. T'Challa later succumbs to an undisclosed illness and dies, and his title is passed on to his younger sister, Shuri.

Originally intended to become a central MCU character, T'Challa appeared in just four MCU films before Boseman died of colon cancer in August 2020. Kevin Feige confirmed that the character would not be recast nor would a digital double be used for any future live-action depictions of T'Challa. Boseman's performance as T'Challa was lauded as being one of the first black superheroes in a big-budget film, and he received critical acclaim for his portrayal of the character. His titular film became the ninth-highest-grossing film of all time and was nominated for the Academy Award for Best Picture.

Alternate versions of T'Challa from within the MCU multiverse appear in the first season of the animated series, What If...? (2021), with Boseman posthumously reprising the final role. Most notable is a depiction of T'Challa as Star-Lord, based on the Marvel Comics character of the same name. In October 2021, a spin-off series centered on the Star-Lord T'Challa was revealed to no longer be in active development, due to Boseman's death.

== Concept, creation, and characterization ==
=== Comics origin ===
Stan Lee and Jack Kirby created Black Panther due to Lee's desire in the mid-60s to include more African and African-American characters in Marvel Comics. In a 1998 interview, Lee explained his motivation: "I wasn't thinking of civil rights. I had a lot of friends who were black and we had artists who were black. So it occurred to me... why aren't there any black heroes?" The name, Black Panther, was inspired by a pulp adventure hero who has a black panther as a helper. Jack Kirby's original concept art for Black Panther used the concept name Coal Tiger. Influences on the character included historical figures such as 14th-century Mali Empire sultan Mansa Musa and 20th-century Jamaican activist Marcus Garvey, as well as Biblical figures such as Ham and Canaan.

There was some internal debate at Marvel about how far to go with the commercially risky introduction of a black superhero. In the first version of the cover for Fantastic Four #52, the Black Panther wore a cowl that exposed his face. In the published version, the cowl became a full face-mask. Previews in other comics didn't show the cover at all, indicating that Marvel was unsure how much to reveal. Following his debut in Fantastic Four #52–53 (July–Aug. 1966) and subsequent guest appearance in Fantastic Four Annual #5 (1967) and with Captain America in Tales of Suspense #97–100 (Jan.– April 1968), the Black Panther journeyed from the fictional African nation of Wakanda to New York City to join the titular American superhero team in The Avengers #52 (May 1968), appearing in that comic for the next few years.

=== Adaptation to film ===
In 2004, David Maisel was hired as chief operating officer of Marvel Studios as he had a plan for the studio to self-finance movies. Marvel entered into a non-recourse debt structure with Merrill Lynch, under which Marvel got $525 million to make a maximum of 10 movies based on the company's properties over eight years, collateralized by certain movie rights to a total of 10 characters, including Black Panther.

=== Casting and execution ===
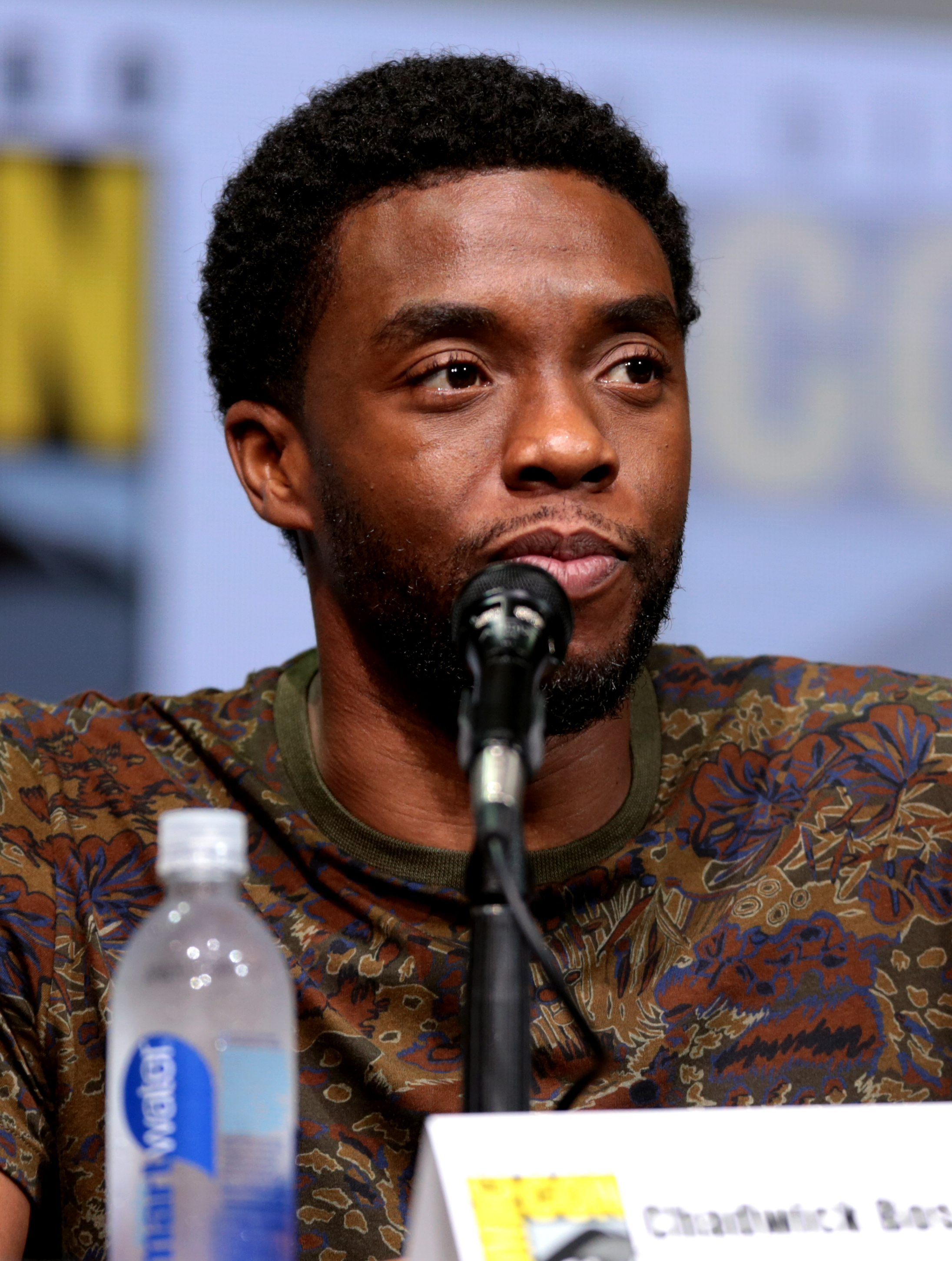
Chadwick Boseman promoting Black Panther at the 2017 San Diego Comic-Con

Chadwick Boseman portrayed T'Challa within the Marvel Cinematic Universe, first appearing in Captain America: Civil War (2016). In the film, he is shown displaying enhanced speed, agility, strength, and durability, which he gains from ingesting the heart-shaped herb, as in the comics. His suit has retractable claws and is made of a vibranium weave, which can deflect heavy machine gun fire and withstand explosive attacks. A newer version of his suit can also absorb kinetic energy (represented as purple highlights) and release it as a light purple shockwave after enough energy has been amassed. It can also fold into a silver necklace. Boseman had a five-picture deal with Marvel.

During the events of Civil War, motivated by revenge for his father's death during the UN signing of the Sokovia Accords in the aftermath of Avengers: Age of Ultron, T'Challa joins Tony Stark's faction to oppose Captain America as he is protecting the Winter Soldier who was implicated for the attack. However, T'Challa learns the bombing attack was actually arranged by Helmut Zemo to orchestrate his own revenge on the Avengers for inadvertently creating the Sokovia crisis which killed his family. After hearing Zemo's confession as he succeeded in turning Stark and Rogers against each other, T'Challa renounces his revenge while preventing Zemo's suicide and handing him over to Everett K. Ross. T'Challa grants Rogers and Barnes sanctuary in Wakanda while also aiding in the latter's recovery from his Hydra brainwashing.

T'Challa is a prince of the African nation of Wakanda, who gains enhanced strength by ingesting the Heart-Shaped Herb, allied with Stark. Producer Kevin Feige explained that the character was included "because we needed a third party. We needed fresh eyes who wasn't embedded with the Avengers and who has a very different point of view than either Tony or Steve." T'Challa is in the "beginning phases of taking on" the Black Panther mantle, and appears in more than a cameo, with a full arc and character journey with "his own conflict and his own people that he's looking out for." Boseman did not audition for the role, instead having a "discussion about what [Marvel] wanted to do and how I saw it and what I wanted to do." T'Challa is torn between needing to live up to traditions and the legacy of his father and Wakanda, and how things need to happen in the present. Boseman developed the Wakandan accent himself, and used it during the entire production "whether he was on camera or not", while the Wakandan language was based on the Xhosa language, which Boseman was taught by John Kani (who played T'Challa's father T'Chaka). The Black Panther costume is a combination of a practical costume and visual effects, featuring a vibranium mesh weave similar to chainmail. Costume designer Judianna Makovsky called the Black Panther costume "difficult" since "you needed sort of a feline body, but it's hard and practical at the same time. You needed a feeling of some sort of ethnicity in there, but of a world [Wakanda] we weren't really creating yet, so you didn't want to go too far and say too much about that world." Additionally, Makovsky felt creating T'Challa's royal look was "a bit of a challenge", avoiding African robes after learning actual African royalty are generally "educated in the West [and] get dressed in Savile Row".

Boseman reprised the role in Black Panther (2018). By October 2015, Joe Robert Cole was in final negotiations to write the film's script. In January 2016, it was announced that Ryan Coogler had been hired to direct the film, and was later revealed to be co-writing the script with Cole. Filming began in January 2017 at Pinewood Studios in Atlanta, Georgia. The film was released on February 16, 2018. During the film's storyline, after completing the ritual of succession, T'Challa finds himself dealing with opposition to his new position from various fronts.

Boseman appeared as Black Panther again in Avengers: Infinity War (2018), and in Avengers: Endgame (2019). Boseman, along with the other Black Panther Wakandan actors, improvised their war chants on set ahead of the battle in Wakanda. Despite both Black Panther and Infinity War filming at the same time, the Russos were not aware of the chants, as they had not yet seen footage from Black Panther, and felt the moment was "incredibly cool".

==== Death of Chadwick Boseman ====
On August 28, 2020, Boseman died after a four-year battle with colon cancer. As a result, his death was written into Black Panther: Wakanda Forever (2022), in which T'Challa dies from an unspecified disease. With the decision of not recasting T'Challa, Marvel would eventually make his younger sister Shuri, played by Letitia Wright, the lead character of the sequel, as well as the new Black Panther.

Fans were divided over the possibility of casting another actor as T'Challa for the Black Panther sequel and other future MCU media in which the character was scheduled to appear, a decision that Marvel Studios denied they would make. It is currently unknown how much, if any, unreleased material has been created with Boseman portraying the character. In November 2020, Marvel Studios' head of production Victoria Alonso denied that the studio plans to create a digital double of Boseman for Wakanda Forever, and that Marvel would "think about what we're going to do next and how" in order to "honor the franchise." On December 10, Kevin Feige confirmed that the role would not be recast, feeling Boseman's portrayal "transcended any previous iteration of the character in Marvel's past." In October 2021, a spin-off series of What If...? centered on the Star-Lord T'Challa variant introduced in the series was revealed to have been in early development prior to Boseman's death, which placed the project in "limbo"; series director Bryan Andrews nonetheless expressed interest in the spin-off being produced "one day" in Boseman's honor, with a different voice actor voicing the character.

== Fictional character biography ==
=== Pursuit of Bucky Barnes ===
In 2016, T'Challa attends a United Nations conference in Vienna where the Sokovia Accords governing superhero activity are to be ratified. However, a bomb kills his father, King T'Chaka of Wakanda. Security footage indicates the bomber is Bucky Barnes, whom T'Challa vows to kill. Steve Rogers and Sam Wilson track Barnes to Bucharest and attempt to protect him from T'Challa and the authorities, but all four, including T'Challa, are apprehended by the Bucharest police and James Rhodes. Impersonating a psychiatrist sent to interview Barnes, Helmut Zemo recites the trigger words to activate Barnes' brainwashing, and sends Barnes on a rampage to cover his own escape. Barnes briefly fights T'Challa while fleeing the building, where Rogers stops Barnes and sneaks him away, recruiting several other Avengers to help him go after Zemo. Tony Stark assembles his own team composed of T'Challa, Natasha Romanoff, Rhodes, Vision, and Peter Parker to capture the renegades. Stark's team intercepts Rogers' group at Leipzig/Halle Airport, where they fight (including personal confrontations against Barnes, Scott Lang, Wanda Maximoff, and Clint Barton), until Romanoff shocks T'Challa to allow Rogers and Barnes to escape. T'Challa tracks Rogers and Barnes to a Siberian Hydra facility, discovering that Zemo is the true perpetrator. While Rogers and Barnes are fighting Stark, T'Challa stops Zemo from committing suicide and takes him to the authorities. T'Challa grants Barnes asylum in Wakanda, where Barnes chooses to return to cryogenic sleep until a cure for his brainwashing is found.

=== King of Wakanda ===
With T'Chaka having died, T'Challa assumes the throne. He and Okoye, the leader of the Dora Milaje regiment, extract T'Challa's ex-lover Nakia from an undercover assignment so she can attend his coronation ceremony with his mother Ramonda and younger sister Shuri. At the ceremony, the Jabari Tribe's leader M'Baku challenges T'Challa for the crown in ritual combat. Although M'Baku initially has the upper hand, T'Challa defeats M'Baku and persuades him to yield rather than die.

When Ulysses Klaue and his accomplice Erik Stevens steal a Wakandan artifact from a London museum, T'Challa's friend and Okoye's lover W'Kabi urges him to bring Klaue back alive. T'Challa, Okoye, and Nakia travel to Busan, South Korea, where Klaue plans to sell the artifact to CIA agent Everett K. Ross. A firefight erupts and Klaue attempts to flee but is caught by T'Challa, who reluctantly releases him to Ross' custody. Erik attacks and extracts Klaue; Ross is gravely injured protecting Nakia. Rather than pursue Klaue, T'Challa takes Ross to Wakanda, where their technology can save him. As Shuri heals Ross, T'Challa confronts Zuri about N'Jobu. Zuri explains that N'Jobu planned to share Wakanda's technology with people of African descent around the world to help them conquer their oppressors. As T'Chaka arrested N'Jobu, the latter attacked Zuri and forced T'Chaka to kill him. T'Chaka ordered Zuri to lie that N'Jobu had disappeared and left behind N'Jobu's American son in order to maintain the lie. This boy grew up to be Stevens, a U.S. black ops soldier who adopted the name "Killmonger". Meanwhile, Killmonger kills Klaue and takes his body to Wakanda. He is brought before the tribal elders, revealing his identity to be N'Jadaka and claim to the throne. Killmonger challenges T'Challa to ritual combat, where he kills Zuri, defeats T'Challa, and hurls him over a waterfall to his presumed death. Killmonger ingests the heart-shaped herb and orders the rest incinerated, but Nakia extracts one first.

Nakia, Shuri, Ramonda, and Ross flee to the Jabari Tribe for aid. They find a comatose T'Challa, rescued by the Jabari in repayment for sparing M'Baku's life. Healed by Nakia's herb, T'Challa returns to fight Killmonger, who dons his own Black Panther suit. Fighting in Wakanda's vibranium mine, T'Challa disrupts Killmonger's suit and stabs him. Killmonger refuses to be healed, choosing to die a free man rather than be incarcerated. T'Challa establishes an outreach center at the building where N'Jobu died, to be run by Nakia and Shuri. In a mid-credits scene, T'Challa appears before the United Nations to reveal Wakanda's true nature to the world.

=== Conflict against Thanos ===
In 2018, T'Challa brings a new robotic arm to Barnes. He then welcomes Rogers, Romanoff, Wilson, Rhodes, Bruce Banner, Maximoff, and Vision when they arrive in Wakanda, so Shuri can work on Vision. He along with the Wakandan army, Barnes, Rogers, Romanoff, Wilson, Rhodes, and Banner fight off the oncoming onslaught of Outriders and witnesses the arrival of Thor, Rocket, and Groot. However, Thanos arrives in Wakanda and completes and activates the Infinity Gauntlet, killing half of all life in the universe. As a result, T'Challa disintegrates along with Barnes, Wilson, Maximoff, Groot, and half of the Wakandan Army.

In 2023, T'Challa is restored to life. He, his restored sister, the Wakandan army, Wilson, Barnes, Maximoff, and Groot are brought by Masters of the Mystic Arts to the destroyed Avengers Compound to join in the final battle against an alternate Thanos. A week later, he attends Stark's funeral.

=== Death and legacy ===
In 2024, T'Challa dies from an unspecified illness that Shuri believed could have been cured by the heart-shaped herb. It is revealed that before he died, he fathered a child with Nakia, Toussaint, who is raised in Haiti by Nakia, as both agreed it would be best for him to grow up away from the pressure of living in Wakanda. T'Challa asked that in the event of an untimely death the two not attend his funeral, so they held their own ceremony in Haiti. Shuri later becomes the new Black Panther, taking on her brother's mantle. Nakia later introduces her to Toussaint, who reveals that his Wakandan name is T'Challa, like his father.

== Alternate versions ==
Several alternate versions of T'Challa appear in the animated series What If...?, with Boseman reprising his role and Maddix Robinson voicing a younger version of him.

=== Star-Lord ===
Star-Lord T'Challa
- Marvel Cinematic Universe character
- First appearance: "What If... T'Challa Became a Star-Lord?" (2021)
- Last appearance: "What If... the Watcher Broke His Oath?" (2021)
- Based on: Black Panther by; Stan Lee; Jack Kirby; Star-Lord by; Steve Englehart; Steve Gan
- Adapted by: Matthew Chauncey
- Voiced by: Chadwick Boseman; Maddix Robinson (young)

In-universe information
- Full name: T'Challa
- Alias: Star-Lord
- Nickname: Cha-Cha
- Titles: Leader of the Ravagers; Prince of Wakanda
- Affiliation: Ravagers; Guardians of the Multiverse
- Weapon: Various energy-based alien blasters
- Family: T'Chaka (father); Ramonda (mother); Shuri (sister); Yondu Udonta (adoptive father)
- Significant other: Nebula
- Relatives: N'Jobu (uncle); N'Jadaka (cousin)
- Origin: Wakanda
- Nationality: Wakandan

In an alternate 1988, the Ravagers are sent to Earth by the Celestial Ego to retrieve his son Peter Quill. However, Yondu Udonta's minions Kraglin and Taserface mistakenly abduct a young T'Challa who agrees to join them in exploring the galaxy.

20 years later, T'Challa becomes a famous galactic outlaw mercenary known as "Star-Lord". He restructured the Ravagers to be like the Merry Men, stopped the robbery of the bank on Tarnax IV with some Skrulls getting injured, provided weaponry to the Ankaran Resistance, saved Drax's species from the Kree, and persuaded Thanos not to decimate half the universe with Thanos joining the Ravagers.

After acquiring the Orb containing the Power Stone on Morag while gaining Korath the Pursuer as a new recruit, T'Challa and the Ravagers head to a bar on Contraxia. T'Challa then meets the bartender Drax who thanked him for saving his family. The Ravagers are then approached by Nebula, who proposes a heist to steal the Embers of Genesis, a cosmic dust form capable of terraforming ecosystems. Nebula and Yondu meet with Taneleer Tivan on Knowhere, while T'Challa infiltrates his collection to find the Embers.

He discovers a Wakandan spacecraft containing a message from his father, T'Chaka. Nebula seemingly betrays the Ravagers, leading to T'Challa being captured and put on display for Tivan's assessment. She later rescues the Ravagers, revealing that she and T'Challa planned a ruse so she could acquire the Embers. T'Challa manages to escape his confinement and battles Tivan with Udonta's help. The two trap Tivan in his own display before handing over control to his assistant Carina. Afterwards, the Ravagers head to Earth where T'Challa reunites with his parents and younger sister in Wakanda.

T'Challa leads the Ravagers to battle Ego on Earth and save Peter Quill before the Watcher emerges and recruits him to join the Guardians of the Multiverse with the mission to defeat a variant of Ultron who is attempting to destroy reality. T'Challa joins Doctor Strange Supreme, Captain Carter, Thor, Gamora, and Killmonger in a battle against Ultron. During the fight, T'Challa steals the Soul Stone in order to reduce Ultron's powers, but the Guardians are still overwhelmed. They eventually succeed after Natasha Romanoff injects Arnim Zola's analog consciousness into Ultron's A.I., shutting him down. T'Challa returns to his universe and teaches Quill how to shoot a blaster.

=== Zombie outbreak ===
In an alternate 2018, T'Challa accompanies the Avengers to San Francisco in an attempt to contain a quantum virus unintentionally released by Hank Pym and Janet van Dyne. As the Avengers are attacked and turned into zombies, T'Challa is rescued by Vision, but soon learns that Vision only saved him so he could harvest T'Challa's body for the infected Wanda Maximoff. When the remaining survivors arrive at Vision's base, Bucky Barnes finds T'Challa missing his right leg. As most of the heroes sacrifice themselves to fend off Maximoff and the rest of the zombies, T'Challa, along with Peter Parker and Scott Lang, take the Quadjet to Wakanda, hoping to use Vision's Mind Stone to find a way to cure the population. However, they discover that all of Wakanda has been infected by a zombified Thanos, until they receive help from Thor, Rocket, and Groot, but Thor was defeated and the latter two were annihilated. T'Challa sacrifices himself by lunging at Thanos and plunging them both into Wakanda's vibranium core; the Infinity Stones are destroyed, releasing a surge of energy.

=== American–Wakandan War ===
In an alternate 2010, T'Challa attempts to ambush Ulysses Klaue, who is selling stolen Vibranium to James Rhodes (representing the United States military). However, he is lured into a trap by Killmonger, who kills both T'Challa and Rhodes, sparking a conflict between the United States and Wakanda. As a funeral for T'Challa is held in Wakanda, Killmonger convinces the Wakandans that T'Challa was killed by Rhodes and earns their trust. After ingesting the Heart-Shaped Herb, Killmonger meets T'Challa's spirit in the Ancestral Realm, where he warns Killmonger that his thirst for power would eventually consume him.

== Reception ==
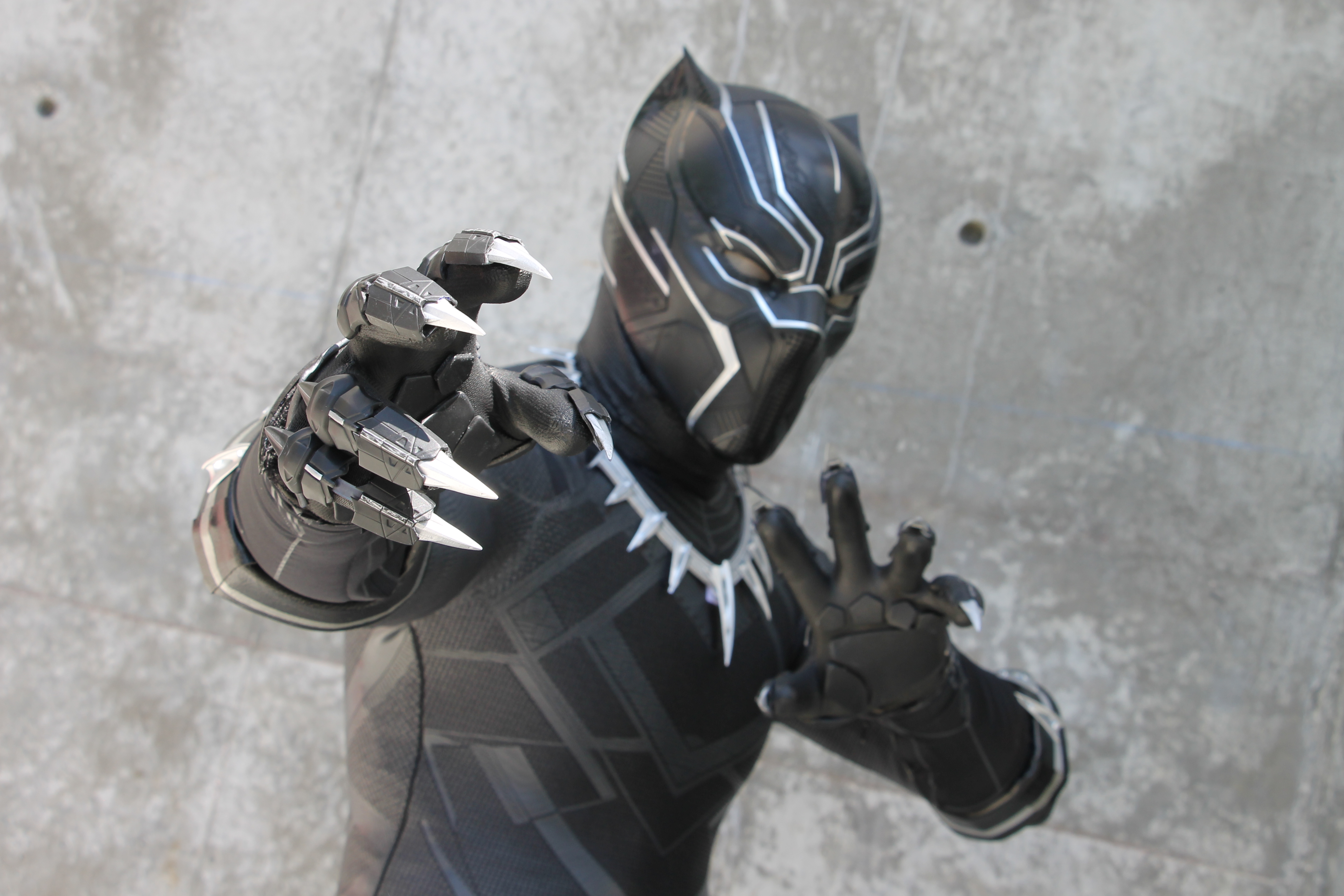
A cosplay of the Black Panther at FanimeCon 2018

Boseman's performance as T'Challa / Black Panther has not only received critical acclaim from critics and audiences, but has become significant as one of the first superheroes of African descent to gain a leading role in a big-budget film. With T'Challa's MCU debut in Captain America: Civil War, Eliana Dockterman, writing for Time, described the character's significance and wrote that he intrigued audiences in a supporting role. Two years later, Jamil Smith, also of Time, wrote that T'Challa's character and the Black Panther film in general were significant as they showed "what it means to be black in both America and Africa—and, more broadly, in the world." He describes T'Challa as a "fictional African King with the technological war power to destroy you—or, worse, the wealth to buy your land" and argued that the film embodied "the most productive responses to bigotry" by showing the potential of minorities, especially those of black descent. Likewise, Todd McCarthy of The Hollywood Reporter praised Boseman's performance, stating that he "certainly holds his own" among strong performances from other actors in the film.

=== Awards and nominations ===
Awards and nominations received by Boseman for his performance as T'Challa include:

Year	Award	Category	Nominated work	Result	Ref.
2016	Teen Choice Awards	Choice Movie: Chemistry	Captain America: Civil War	Nominated	
2016	Teen Choice Awards	Choice Movie: Scene Stealer	Captain America: Civil War	Won	
2017	NAACP Image Awards	Outstanding Supporting Actor in a Motion Picture	Captain America: Civil War	Nominated	
2017	Nickelodeon Kids' Choice Awards	#SQUAD	Captain America: Civil War	Won	
2017	Saturn Awards	Best Supporting Actor	Captain America: Civil War	Nominated	
2018	MTV Movie & TV Awards	Best Performance in a Movie	Black Panther	Won	
2018	MTV Movie & TV Awards	Best Hero	Black Panther	Won	
2018	MTV Movie & TV Awards	Best Fight (Black Panther vs M'Baku)	Black Panther	Nominated	
2018	MTV Movie & TV Awards	Best On-Screen Team (with Lupita Nyong'o, Letitia Wright and Danai Gurira)	Black Panther	Nominated	
2018	BET Awards	Best Actor	Marshall and Black Panther	Won	
2018	Saturn Awards	Best Actor	Black Panther	Won	
2018	Teen Choice Awards	Choice Sci-Fi Movie Actor	Black Panther	Won	
2018	Teen Choice Awards	Choice Liplock	Black Panther	Nominated	
2018	Teen Choice Awards	Choice Movie Ship	Black Panther	Nominated	
2019	Screen Actors Guild Awards	Outstanding Performance by a Cast in a Motion Picture	Black Panther	Won	
2019	Black Reel Awards	Outstanding Actor	Black Panther	Won	
2019	Nickelodeon Kids' Choice Awards	Favorite Movie Actor	Black Panther	Won	
2019	Nickelodeon Kids' Choice Awards	Favorite Superhero	Black Panther	Won	
2019	NAACP Image Awards	Outstanding Actor in a Motion Picture	Black Panther	Won	
2019	BET Awards	Best Actor	Avengers: Infinity War and Avengers: Endgame	Won	
2022	Primetime Creative Arts Emmy Awards	Outstanding Character Voice-Over Performance (posthumous)	What If...? (for "What If... T'Challa Became a Star-Lord?")	Won	
