= Vision (Marvel Cinematic Universe) =

Character in the Marvel Cinematic Universe

- Marvel Cinematic Universe character
- Paul Bettany as Vision in Avengers: Age of Ultron
- First appearance: Avengers: Age of Ultron (2015)
- Based on: Vision by: Roy Thomas; John Buscema
- Adapted by: Joss Whedon
- Portrayed by: Paul Bettany

In-universe information
- Full name: The Vision
- Species: Synthezoid
- Occupation: Avenger
- Affiliation: Avengers
- Weapon: Mind Stone
- Significant other: Wanda Maximoff (Note: A magically constructed version of Vision is married to Wanda in WandaVision..)
- Children: Billy Maximoff (Note: Magically constructed by Wanda in WandaVision.); Tommy Maximoff (Note: Magically constructed by Wanda in WandaVision.)
- Origin: Midtown Manhattan, New York, United States
- Creators: Ultron; Tony Stark; Bruce Banner; Thor; Helen Cho; Virgil Horton

The Vision (Note: The character is properly known as "the Vision". However, he is sometimes referred to by other characters without the definite article as a shorthand, when using the vocative case, or to convey familiarity.) is a fictional character portrayed by Paul Bettany in the Marvel Cinematic Universe (MCU) media franchise, based on the Marvel Comics character of the same name. Originally created by Ultron to serve as his body, Vision is a vibranium-based male android (or "Synthezoid") sporting the Mind Stone, and uploaded with the core software of Tony Stark's artificial intelligence, J.A.R.V.I.S..

After defeating Ultron, Vision subsequently joins the Avengers and develops a romantic relationship with his team-member, Wanda Maximoff. Vision is later killed by Thanos after the latter removes the Mind Stone from Vision's head to complete the Infinity Gauntlet in order to initiate the Blip. In her grief, Maximoff creates a false reality in Westview, New Jersey, and recreates a version of Vision and has two children with him, Billy and Tommy. Vision's real body is later recommissioned and reprogrammed by S.W.O.R.D., sporting an all-white look, but later gains his memories back with the help of Maximoff's alternate Vision. Maximoff later deletes the alternate version after returning the town to normalcy. Vision remains in hiding while searching for his own meaning, his mind occupied by the AIs J.A.R.V.I.S., F.R.I.D.A.Y., D.U.M.-E., U., and E.D.I.T.H., as well as Ultron, who has been trapped within his mind for years. Pursued by the bounty hunter Paladín, Vision discovers the existence of Tommy, who is inhabiting the body of a grifter named Thomas Shepherd, and also facing a female synthezoid named Jocasta and her former associate, known as the Client, who was behind the capture of Vision.

Bettany has appeared as the character in the films Avengers: Age of Ultron (2015), Captain America: Civil War (2016), Avengers: Infinity War (2018), in addition to the Disney+ miniseries WandaVision (2021) and VisionQuest (2026). Alternate versions of the character have appeared in the animated series What If...? (2021–2024), also voiced by Bettany. It has been announced that the character will return in the film Avengers: Secret Wars (2027).

== Fictional character biography ==
=== Creation and joining the Avengers ===
In 2015, J.A.R.V.I.S. is apparently destroyed by Ultron, but it is later revealed that he actually distributed his consciousness throughout the Internet, allowing his security protocols to delay Ultron's attempt to access Earth's nuclear weapon launch codes long enough for Tony Stark to work out what had happened. The Avengers capture a synthetic vibranium body created by Ultron for himself, powered by the Mind Stone, and bring it to Avengers Tower, where Stark and Bruce Banner upload J.A.R.V.I.S. as the core software for the body. After a brief fight with other Avengers, who disagree with this effort, Thor uses Mjolnir's lightning to power its completion, creating the Vision. Thor explains that the gem in his forehead is one of the six Infinity Stones, the most powerful objects in existence. Having gained consciousness, Vision sides with Stark, Banner, Thor, Steve Rogers, Clint Barton, Pietro Maximoff, and Wanda Maximoff against Ultron as he wishes to protect life. He lifts and hands Mjolnir to Thor; the hammer has been enchanted so that only "worthy" individuals can lift it thus convincing the Avengers that he can be trusted. In Sokovia, Vision fights scores of Ultron's sentries, rescues Wanda from the collapsing city, and destroys Ultron himself, although it is later revealed that Vision copied Ultron into a firewalled section of his own mind at that time.

Sometime after, Vision arrives at the Avengers Compound and joins the Avengers alongside Wanda, Sam Wilson, and James Rhodes, led by Rogers and Natasha Romanoff.

=== Sokovia Accords and the Avengers Civil War ===
In 2016, Vision phases into Wanda's bedroom and tells her and Rogers that Stark and Secretary of State Thaddeus Ross have arrived at the Compound. He learns about the Sokovia Accords and agrees with Stark on it, understanding that the United Nations would have control over the Avengers, remarking that the group's existence invites challenge and conflict, which often results in catastrophe. Vision is tasked to watch Wanda, after she is placed on house arrest at the Compound. He attempts to make her feel comfortable by cooking her paprikash and they start to form a romantic relationship. Later, Vision sees Barton trying to break Wanda out on Rogers' behalf, but stops him. Wanda interferes and telekinetically pushes Vision beneath the Compound. Unharmed, Vision flies to Germany to help Stark, Romanoff, Rhodes, T'Challa, and Peter Parker to stop Rogers, Wilson, Barton, Scott Lang, and Bucky Barnes. While tending to Wanda after the fight, he aims to disable Wilson with an energy beam, but accidentally shoots down and cripples Rhodes. Vision flies back to New York and visits Rhodes in the Columbia University Medical Center, before going back to the Compound.

=== Infinity War and death ===
In 2018, Vision, now in a romantic relationship with Wanda, visits her in Edinburgh. However, the Mind Stone begins alerting Vision to an unknown threat before they are ambushed by Corvus Glaive and Proxima Midnight, two of Thanos' children. Vision is badly wounded by Glaive's namesake, which limits his powers. Glaive and Midnight attempt to remove Vision's Mind Stone, but Wanda is able to hold them off until the pair are rescued by Rogers, Wilson, and Romanoff and return to the Compound. Vision volunteers to kill himself in order to destroy the Stone, but the Avengers refuse and bring him to Wakanda, where Vision is examined by Shuri, who attempts to safely remove the Stone without killing him, with Wanda standing vigil over the operation. When Midnight, Cull Obsidian, and the Outriders attack Wakanda, Wanda intervenes in the battle, leaving Shuri defenseless to Glaive, who infiltrated the center. Vision fights Glaive, and is nearly defeated before being rescued by Rogers. Vision in turn saves Rogers, killing Glaive with his own weapon. Thanos arrives, and as the Avengers attempt to hold him off, Vision manages to convince Wanda to destroy the Mind Stone, which she does, at the cost of his life. However, Thanos uses the Time Stone to reverse the action, allowing him to rip the Mind Stone out of Vision's head.

=== Wanda's Hex and resurrection ===
By 2023, Vision's body is taken into S.W.O.R.D.'s custody and experimented on at their headquarters in Florida, who hope to get him back online. Maximoff asks to be given custody of the body to give Vision a proper burial, but is denied. She travels to Westview, New Jersey, where Vision had purchased a plot of land for them to live at before his death. In her grief, Maximoff turns Westview into an alternate reality to her liking, later being dubbed the "Hex", also creating a Hex Vision. Within the Hex, she and Hex Vision are married, live in a suburban neighborhood, and he works for Computational Services Inc.

After Wanda becomes pregnant with twins, Hex Vision momentarily grows suspicious of their surroundings. Nonetheless, Hex Vision joins the neighborhood watch and Wanda gives birth to Billy and Tommy. When the twins grow up rapidly, he continues to question his and Wanda's life in Westview and uses his powers to learn that one of his co-workers is under mind control. He investigates further, and on the edge of town he finds residents frozen in place, including his neighbor Agnes. He discovers a hexagonal barrier and tries to leave, but begins to disintegrate before he can reach the nearby S.W.O.R.D. outpost while telling the S.W.O.R.D. agents and Darcy Lewis that the people inside need help. Wanda expands the Hex, restoring Vision. After waking up, he finds Lewis in Westview and awakens her from her trance. While heading home with her to confront Wanda, Lewis tells him about his life.

Vision's body is brought to a S.W.O.R.D. base outside Westview where S.W.O.R.D. director Tyler Hayward uses remnants of Maximoff's magic on a drone to reactivate him, now with a white body and his memories erased. Vision is programmed to get rid of Maximoff and is deployed into the Hex. He approaches Maximoff, who asks if it is really him. He pretends to caress her, but attacks her, until Hex Vision arrives and engages in a fight with him, while Maximoff fights Agatha Harkness. Vision and Hex Vision continue their fight inside the Westview library, where they discuss the paradox of the Ship of Theseus and Vision permits Hex Vision to restore Vision's memories. He realizes that he is an Avenger and flies away to process this information.

Hex Vision witnesses Maximoff's fight with Harkness in the sky. Afterwards, he learns that he is a memory of Wanda that was created through her powers and the Mind Stone, and says his final goodbyes before he fades from existence when the Hex is removed.

=== Seeking meaning after Westview ===
Years later, Vision lives and works in a traditional Scottish pub in Edinburgh owned by Fiona Guthrie, which he and Wanda used to frequent. Inside his Mindspace, he resides with AIs J.A.R.V.I.S., F.R.I.D.A.Y., D.U.M.-E., U., and E.D.I.T.H., who help him improve his social interaction, while keeping Ultron captive. Vision relives his previous iteration's memories to understand his feelings but refuses to view those of the Vision created by Wanda in Westview, believing they were unreal. Ultron criticizes his denial, while Vision questions Ultron's renewed understanding of humanity. Mercenaries led by bounty hunter Paladin, hired by an unknown client, attack the pub to capture Vision, killing Fiona in the crossfire and forcing him to flee. The AIs discover that Ultron betrayed them by informing Paladin through the dark web after finding a bounty on Vision. Paladin captures Thomas Shepherd, a grifter who claims to be Vision's son. Paladin hacks Vision's mind to alert the AIs to Tommy's existence and capture. Paladin, whom the AIs discover is the identity given to a long list of bounty hunters, meets Vision at Fiona's bar, where he blackmails Vision to turn himself in, knowing he cares for his son. Vision threatens him back, telling him that he is different from the old Vision, before escaping. Inside, he is burdened by living up to the previous Vision, but Ultron tells him to rescue Tommy while J.A.R.V.I.S. cautions him.

Vision goes to Saint Mabyn's, a prison where Tommy is being held, to rescue Tommy, but is trapped in an EMP cage, freeing Ultron. Vision and Tommy escape the room but Paladin seriously wounds Vision with adamantium rounds. After convincing Tommy to escape without him, J.A.R.V.I.S. sacrificially deletes himself to re-route power to the other AIs to ensure Vision's survival. Tommy rescues Vision and they escape by car. Vision treats his wounds with sulfuric acid, and struggles to bond with Tommy. Ultron criticizes Vision's blunt approach to telling the truth, which alienates Tommy. As Vision's processors continue failing, he asks Tommy to shut him down and reboot him using the pool as a coolant. Vision reassures Tommy that he is real, and Tommy uses his super-speed to revive Vision, alerting the Butcherbird Killer, a female-coded android serial killer who etches wings near their victims. Following J.A.R.V.I.S.'s funeral, the AIs discover that the reboot connected Vision to the Butcherbird Killer, who invades his Mindspace and possesses Vision, threatening to harm Tommy if Vision interferes, but E.D.I.T.H. manages to expel her. Vision, Tommy, and the AIs investigate the killer and discover that her victims were board members of Markridge Biotech, whose founders developed the first stable synthetic consciousness. The Butcherbird Killer has collected biomarkers from her victims, leaving Katerina Wells as the only surviving founder. With the help of Tommy's pickpocket friend Lisa Molinari, Vision and Tommy infiltrate a gala hosted by Wells, where Vision tells Tommy about J.I.M., an unstable synthetic man whose emotions caused him to combust. Tommy realizes Vision has kept Ultron's existence secret. The Butcherbird Killer attacks the gala and reveals herself as Jocasta, a synthezoid based on Markridge founder Dr. Josephine Carrington. Unable to defeat her, Vision allows Ultron to take control. Ultron kills Wells, preventing Jocasta from obtaining the final biomarker, then betrays Vision by locking him and the other AIs out of their systems, and leaves with Tommy.

Trapped in Ultron's attic within the Mindspace, Vision and the other AIs attempt to track Ultron. They find recordings showing Ultron talking with Tommy at a pub before allowing Paladin to kidnap him, as well as a memory cache revealing that Ultron had leaked Vision's location to Paladin. They also discover that Ultron scanned Wells' face before Jocasta vaporized her, giving him possession of the final biomarker. The AIs realize that lowering the firewall in their code is the only way for Vision to regain control of his body to rescue Tommy, though doing so would also grant Ultron access to the digital world. Ultron meets Vision in the attic and convinces him to lower the firewall, allowing Vision to regain control while Ultron escapes the Mindspace, though F.R.I.D.A.Y. pursues him. Vision awakens alongside Lisa aboard a plane headed to Madripoor.

Vision and Lisa arrive in Madripoor and find Paladin with Tommy; they are blackmailed into surrendering, but are then attacked by soldiers of the Ten Rings, led by Raza al-Wazar on behalf of the Client. Surrounded, Vision and Paladin fight against Raza’s soldiers and they are rescued by Tommy, Lisa, and E.D.I.T.H. in Paladin’s van; however, Jocasta manages to infect Lisa with a prototype nanobot. After saving Lisa from falling unconscious and escaping Madripoor, Vision reveals the truth to Tommy about the WandaVision sitcom and his own memories. Vision receives a call from F.R.I.D.A.Y., who is inside Jocasta’s Mindspace; she discovers information about Jocasta’s nanobots and gains access to them using a set of keys, all but one. Vision is then contacted by the Client, who offers to help save Lisa in exchange for Vision surrendering to him. Vision and Tommy receive assistance from Paladin, who provides them with Corvus Glaive’s weapon, which Vision can use as a power source to locate the source code. Within his own mind, Vision encounters manifestations of the original Vision, J.I.M., and Professor Phineas Horton. They push him to admit that his denial actually stems from his inability to bear his grief at losing Billy, Tommy, and Wanda, a confession that leads him to finally accept his memories as his own and Tommy as his son. As a result Vision is given the source code for Horton’s original AI by J.I.M., allowing him to neutralize the nanobot controlling Lisa. Before departing with the Client, Vision leaves a message for Tommy, a reference to WandaVision, in which he reaffirms Tommy’s status as his son. However, Vision and Jocasta are captured by the Client’s men.

Vision and Jocasta awaken and are greeted by the Client, known as Virgil Horton, Phineas Horton's grandson and Carrington's ex-husband, who served as Ultron’s human avatar within the Mindspace. Upon regaining control, they discover that Virgil was the mastermind behind everything: from the reconstruction of Vision at S.W.O.R.D. to the Carrington's transformation into Jocasta, a process that erased her memories, and his plan to use Carrington’s nanobots to seize control of all humanity. Vision and Jocasta are rescued by Tommy, but Virgil kills Jocasta; before dying, she releases Ultron, who uses Carrington’s nanobots to construct a body and eliminates Virgil. Vision confronts a tormented Ultron to prevent him from using nanobots to destroy all of humanity. Vision reunites Tommy, Lisa, E.D.I.T.H., and Paladin, who survived an attack by Virgil’s men to figure out how to deactivate the nanobots before they reach London; meanwhile, Vision takes on the task of dealing with Ultron alone and back in the Mindspace, in a scenario themed after WandaVision titled Ultra Vision, Vision traps Ultron in a maddening simulation, but all his efforts to reason with him prove futile. He then discovers that Paladin, Tommy, Lisa, D.U.M.-E., and U. have all fallen under the control of Ultron’s nanobots. Unable to stop him, Vision and E.D.I.T.H. are met by F.R.I.D.A.Y., who somehow survived Ultron’s onslaught and she has come to understand the concept of mercy. When Vision convinces Ultron to accept his loss, he manages to incinerate both his own core and Ultron’s too, sacrificing himself to self-destruct the nanobots. However, Vision is later reactivated by Tommy and Billy, who arrive just in time to save him, and the three are reunited. Vision leaves the Mindspace to finally be with Tommy and Billy, perhaps sensing that he might see Wanda again and says goodbye to F.R.I.D.A.Y., D.U.M.-E., U., and E.D.I.T.H., who are now free to explore the world on their own terms. However, Vision receives a call from Ultron, who also survived, thanks to a few remaining nanobots and decides to go off to see the world.

== Alternate versions ==
Several alternate universe versions of Vision appear in the animated series What If...?, with Bettany reprising his role while Ross Marquand voices a version of Ultron in Vision's body.

=== Zombie outbreak ===
In an alternate 2018, a quantum virus is unleashed and infects several humans, turning them into zombies. The unaffected Vision keeps the zombified Wanda contained at Camp Lehigh, where he experiments with the Mind Stone to find a cure and manages to cure Scott Lang and preserve his severed head in a jar. However, Vision is unable to cure Wanda, leading him to lure in individuals, such as T'Challa, and feed them to her. Eventually, after the surviving Avengers and their allies arrive at the base, Vision hands over the Mind Stone to Bruce Banner, killing himself in the process.

=== Mysterio's Enforcer ===
In an alternate future, where the Emergence destroyed Earth years before the Eternals could stop it, Vision (in his "White Vision" form) became the mindless and emotionless lieutenant of Quentin Beck's Iron Federation, helping him impose his rule over what is left from Earth. He is sent to wipe out the Alliance, until he is disabled by Riri Williams, who then uses his remains to convert herself into a human/synthezoid hybrid.

=== Other versions ===
- In an alternate 2015, Ultron successfully transfers his consciousness into Vision's body, kills most of the Avengers and gains control of the Infinity Stones and destroys all of life in the universe. He becomes aware of the Watcher and the Multiverse and attempts to destroy them all. With the help of the Guardians of the Multiverse, the Watcher manage to stop and destroy him. Another variant of this Ultron who did not gain awareness of the Multiverse later assists Captain Peggy Carter in saving the Watcher from the Eminence.
- In an alternate universe, Vision was captured by Doctor Strange Supreme and taken to his makeshift dimension. He was freed by Carter and began fighting against Carol Danvers.

== Conception and characterization ==
A character named The Vision debuted in a short comic story in Marvel Mystery Comics #13 (Nov. 1940) as an alien law enforcement officer also known as Aarkus, continuing as a regular feature in that superhero anthology through issue #48 (Oct. 1943). In the late 1960s, editor Stan Lee and writer Roy Thomas decided to add a new team member to the superhero-team series The Avengers. Thomas wanted to bring back the Golden Age alien Vision but Lee was set on introducing an android member. Thomas ultimately compromised by using a new, android Vision. The second Vision first appeared in The Avengers #57 (Oct. 1968). Thomas wanted the character to be white as befitting his ghostly name, but printing limitations of the time would have rendered him colorless, with un-inked paper where his skin should be. He settled on red as he did not want Vision to be green like the Hulk or blue like the Atlanteans. The character has been compared with Spock from Star Trek, but Thomas said that he was barely aware of the TV series at the time. He acknowledged being influenced by the Adam Link character by Otto Binder, one of the first robots treated as a sympathetic character rather than as a mechanical tool.

In The Avengers #75 (April 1970), the Scarlet Witch is reintroduced to the team and soon becomes a love interest for the Vision. Thomas recounted, "I felt that a romance of some sort would help the character development in The Avengers, and the Vision was a prime candidate because he appeared only in that mag... as did Wanda, for that matter. So they became a pair, for just such practical considerations. It would also, I felt, add to the development I was doing on the Vision's attempting to become 'human'."

=== Characterization ===
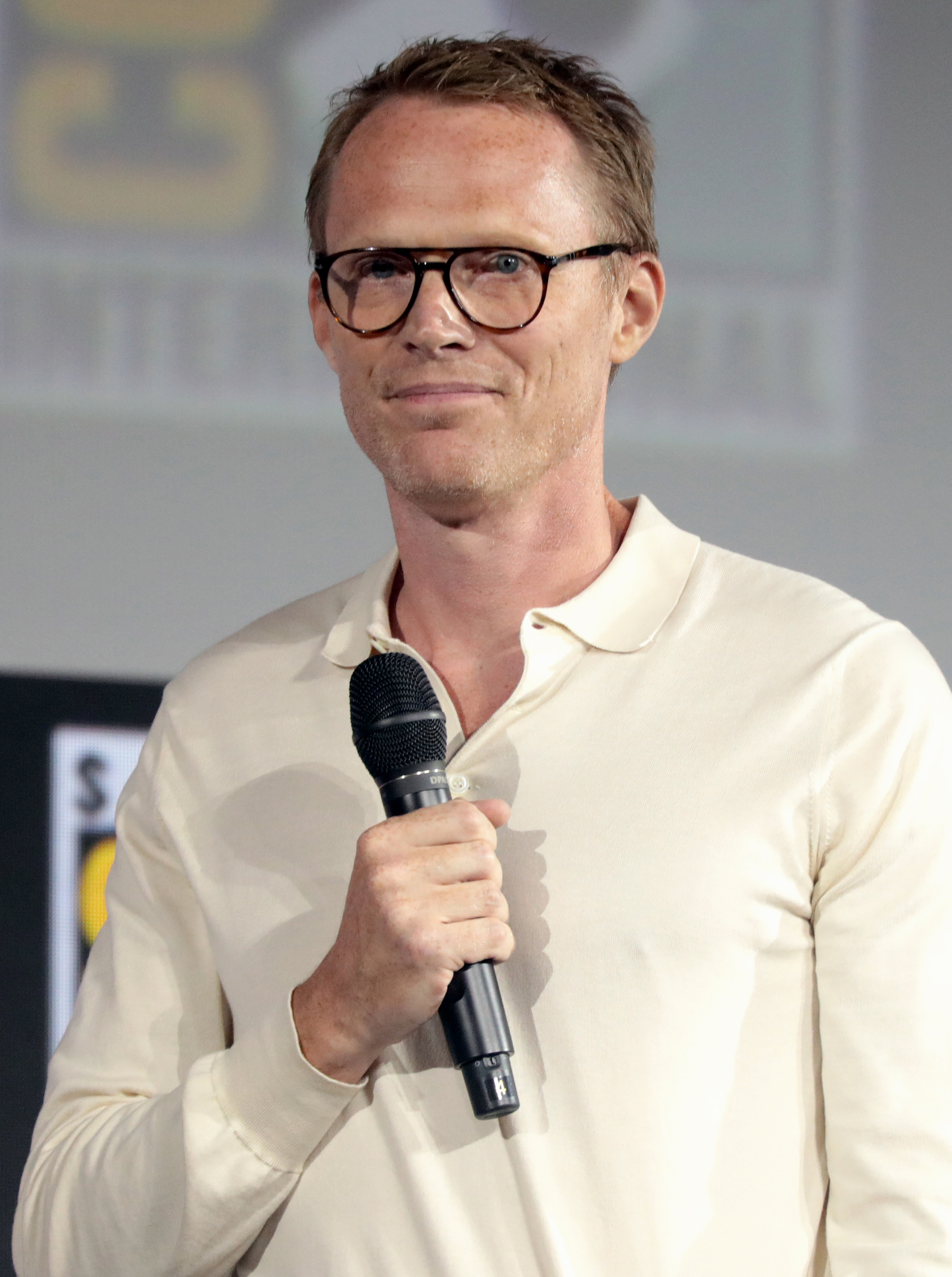
Paul Bettany portrays Vision.

Prior to the introduction of Vision in the MCU, Paul Bettany had voiced J.A.R.V.I.S., Tony Stark's A.I. companion in previous films. Bettany admitted that he had little idea of what the role was, even as he recorded it, simply doing it as a favor for Jon Favreau. He was cast again as the Vision, an android created by Ultron. Bettany stated that he was surprised when Whedon asked him if he wanted to be the Vision because once an actor has been cast as a particular character in the MCU, they usually are not cast as another. On what intrigued him about the Vision, Bettany said, "The thing that appealed to me is that this sort of nascent creature being born, being both omnipotent and totally naive, the sort of danger of that and complex nature of a thing being born that is that powerful and that created in a second and the choices he makes morally are really complex and interesting. They've really managed to maintain all of that". Bettany also stated that the Vision feels paternal and protective to a number of people in the film, particularly Wanda Maximoff, and has the ability to change his density. Bettany did wire work for the part. Whedon stated he wanted to include the Vision in a second Avengers film before he signed onto the first film. Vision's on-screen appearance was designed by Trent Claus and his team at Lola VFX, based on concepts by Ryan Meinerding. Bettany's make-up, which consisted of a mix of face paint and prosthetics, took two hours to apply with make-up artists Jeremy Woodhead and Nik Williams citing the correct hue of the Vision's skin as the hardest thing to figure out. Ultimately, however, the prosthetics and tracking dots were removed digitally and replaced with CG.

Discussing the development of the character in Captain America: Civil War, Bettany noted that because the Vision was only created in the previous film, Age of Ultron, "you see my character get born... He must be both omnipotent and yet totally naive at the same time. And experiencing the world in real time and his place in it. Is he going to be a force of good or a force of evil?" Bettany also said he was interested in exploring "what it means to be human and what love is" with the character, as "The only way one can guarantee one's loyalty is love." This is exhibited in the connection Vision begins to form with Wanda Maximoff, with Bettany commenting, "They both have these new burgeoning powers that they don't understand ... I think he's worried that they're both dangerous. So he feels this real connection with her." As the Vision has the ability to create a projected disguise, he chooses to dress similarly to Howard Stark's attache, Edwin Jarvis. One review notes that "Vision is an android who gained consciousness and an affinity for love all at the same time, and so the latter is of the utmost importance to him".

In WandaVision, Bettany portrays a new version of the character created by Wanda within her reality from the part of the Mind Stone that lives in her, who is the embodiment of her sadness, hope, and love. Given this, Bettany described this Vision as "decent and honorable". He was influenced by the performances of Dick Van Dyke and Hugh Laurie for this version. Bettany also plays the original character, referred to as "The Vision", who is reassembled and reactivated by S.W.O.R.D. (Sentient Weapon Observation and Response Division). That version has an all-white appearance similar to when the comic book character was resurrected with an all-white body and without his memories and emotions. Bettany differentiated the two versions by portraying The Vision as familiar and intimidating at the same time.

In October 2022, it was announced that another spin-off from WandaVision (2021) would be released after Agatha All Along (2024). The spin-off was subtitled VisionQuest starring Bettany as Vision. The series debuted on Disney+ in fall of 2026.

=== Appearance and special effects ===
A review of the character for The Hollywood Reporter notes: "The comic book Vision employs a garish green-and-yellow costume, matched with a bright red face — a color scheme that may be a little over-the-top for the more subtly-hued Marvel Cinematic Universe — but even so, the mixture of purple, blue and grey is an unexpected, and unexpectedly bold, choice for Paul Bettany's character".

In terms of fashion while maintaining a civilian appearance, Vision attempts to emulate classic human style, including wearing an ascot tie.

When Vision is reactivated by S.W.O.R.D., his entire body is white and he has light blue eyes.

== Reception ==
=== Critical response ===
Following the release of WandaVision, Jen Chaney of Vulture stated, "Olsen and Bettany's characters were often treated like benchwarmers on an all-star team in the Avengers movies. Here, they really shine." The review further found that Bettany "slides easily into the role of the devoted, kinda square, goofball husband," and praised his physical comedy skills. Saim Cheeda of Comic Book Resources praised Bettany's performance across the MCU, especially in WandaVision, writing, "Paul Bettany has proved in WandaVision that he is the absolute perfect choice for playing Vision, nailing many of his characteristics." Tyler Pisapia of Looper inducted Bettany's portrayal of Vision through the MCU among his best performances overall, stating, "From his heroics — and ultimate death — in the Avengers franchise to his subsequent revival in WandaVision, Bettany's Vision has added a deeply soulful component to the MCU through his portrayal of a being whose synthetic structure doesn't deprive him of his essential humanity." Matt Purslow of IGN wrote Bettany "effortlessly takes to the comedic skits" and that he and Olsen "provide a fantastic amount of life, wit, and emotion". TVLine named Bettany "Performer of the Week" for the week of January 16, 2021.

=== Accolades ===
Year	Award	Category	Work	Result	Ref.
2016	Saturn Awards	Best Supporting Actor	Avengers: Age of Ultron	Nominated	
2016	Teen Choice Awards	Choice Movie: Chemistry (Note: Also with Robert Downey Jr., Scarlett Johansson, Don Cheadle, and Chadwick Boseman.)	Captain America: Civil War	Nominated	
2021	Primetime Emmy Awards	Outstanding Lead Actor in a Limited Series or Movie	WandaVision	Nominated	
2022	Critics' Choice Awards	Best Actor in a Movie/Miniseries	WandaVision	Nominated	
2022	Critics' Choice Super Awards	Best Actor in a Superhero Series	WandaVision	Nominated	
2022	Golden Globe Awards	Best Actor for Miniseries or Television Film	WandaVision	Nominated	
2022	Hollywood Critics Association TV Awards	Best Actor in a Limited Series, Anthology Series, or Television Movie	WandaVision	Nominated	
2022	Satellite Awards	Best Actor for Television Series Musical or Comedy	WandaVision	Nominated	
