= Captain America: The First Avenger =

2011 Marvel Studios film

- Theatrical release poster
- Directed by: Joe Johnston
- Screenplay by: Christopher Markus; Stephen McFeely
- Based on: Captain America by: Joe Simon; Jack Kirby
- Produced by: Kevin Feige
- Starring: Chris Evans; Tommy Lee Jones; Hugo Weaving; Hayley Atwell; Sebastian Stan; Dominic Cooper; Toby Jones; Neal McDonough; Derek Luke; Stanley Tucci
- Cinematography: Shelly Johnson
- Edited by: Jeffrey Ford; Robert Dalva
- Music by: Alan Silvestri
- Production company: Marvel Studios
- Distributed by: Paramount Pictures (Note: In July 2013, the film's distribution rights were transferred from Paramount Pictures to Walt Disney Studios Motion Pictures.)
- Release dates: July 19, 2011 (El Capitan Theatre); July 22, 2011 (United States)
- Running time: 124 minutes
- Country: United States
- Language: English
- Budget: $140–216.7 million
- Box office: $370.6 million

Captain America: The First Avenger is a 2011 American superhero film based on the Marvel Comics character Captain America. Produced by Marvel Studios and distributed by Paramount Pictures, it is the fifth film in the Marvel Cinematic Universe (MCU). The film was directed by Joe Johnston, written by Christopher Markus and Stephen McFeely, and stars Chris Evans as Steve Rogers / Captain America alongside Tommy Lee Jones, Hugo Weaving, Hayley Atwell, Sebastian Stan, Dominic Cooper, Toby Jones, Neal McDonough, Derek Luke, and Stanley Tucci. During World War II, Rogers, a frail man, is transformed into the super-soldier Captain America and must stop the Red Skull (Weaving) from using the Tesseract as an energy source for world domination.

The film began as a concept in 1997 and was scheduled for distribution by Artisan Entertainment. However, a lawsuit disrupted the project and was not settled until September 2003. In 2005, Marvel Studios received a loan from Merrill Lynch, and planned to finance and release the film through Paramount Pictures. Directors Jon Favreau and Louis Leterrier were interested in directing the project before Johnston was approached in 2008. The principal characters were cast between March and June 2010. Production began in June, and filming took place in London, Manchester, Caerwent, Liverpool, and Los Angeles. Several different techniques were used by the visual effects company Lola to create the physical appearance of the character before he becomes Captain America.

Captain America: The First Avenger premiered at the El Capitan Theatre in Los Angeles on July 19, 2011, and was released in the United States on July 22, as part of Phase One of the MCU. The film was commercially successful, grossing over $370 million worldwide, and received positive reviews from critics, who praised Evans' performance, the film's depiction of its 1940s time period, and Johnston's direction. Two direct sequels have been released: Captain America: The Winter Soldier (2014) and Captain America: Civil War (2016).

== Plot ==
In the present day, scientists in the Arctic uncover an old aircraft with someone frozen inside and a circular shield. In March 1942, during World War II, Nazi lieutenant general and Hydra leader Johann Schmidt steals a mysterious relic called the Tesseract, (Note: Producer Kevin Feige stated that the Tesseract of the films is based on the Cosmic Cube of the comics. After Thor: The Dark World (2013), he further stated it was also the Space Stone.) which possesses untold godly powers, from the town of Tønsberg in German-occupied Norway.

In New York City, Steve Rogers is rejected for U.S. Army recruitment due to his small stature and poor health. While attending the Stark Expo, an event held by famous engineer Howard Stark, Rogers attempts to enlist again. Overhearing Rogers tell his best friend, James "Bucky" Barnes, that he wants to fight for his country, Dr. Abraham Erskine allows Rogers to enlist. He is recruited into the Strategic Scientific Reserve as part of a "super-soldier" experiment under Erskine, Stark, Colonel Chester Phillips, and British MI6 agent Peggy Carter. Phillips is not convinced by Erskine's claims that Rogers is the right person for the procedure until Rogers selflessly jumps on a grenade as part of a test. Erskine reveals to Rogers that he was a scientist under Schmidt, until the latter took a prototype version of the super-soldier formula that gave him superhuman strength but painfully changed his appearance.

Schmidt and Dr. Arnim Zola harness the energies of the Tesseract to fuel Zola's inventions and Hydra's planned worldwide offensive. Schmidt discovers Erskine's location and sends an assassin, Heinz Kruger, to kill him. Erskine and Stark put Rogers through the super-soldier treatment, injecting him with the formula and dosing him with "vita-rays". After Rogers emerges from the experiment taller and more muscular, Kruger kills Erskine and flees with the last vial of the formula. Rogers pursues and captures Kruger, but the assassin avoids interrogation by killing himself with a cyanide capsule. The vial is destroyed during the chase. With Erskine dead and his formula lost, U.S. Senator Brandt has Rogers tour the nation as the mascot "Captain America" to promote war bonds while scientists study his blood and attempt to reverse-engineer the formula. In 1943, while on tour in Italy performing for active servicemen, Rogers learns that Barnes's unit is MIA following a battle against Schmidt's forces. Carter arranges for Stark to fly Rogers behind enemy lines to mount a rescue. Rogers infiltrates Schmidt's fortress, frees Barnes and the other prisoners, and confronts Schmidt. The latter escapes, but first he removes a mask to reveal his red, skull-like visage that has earned him the sobriquet "Red Skull".

Rogers recruits Barnes and other freed prisoners to form the Howling Commandos. Stark outfits Rogers with an upgraded uniform and a circular shield made of a rare, nearly indestructible metal called vibranium. Rogers and his team sabotage various Hydra operations while he and Carter begin to fall in love. In 1945, the team assaults a train carrying Zola. They capture him, but Barnes falls from the train to his apparent death. (Note: Joe Johnston, Shelly Johnson, and Jeffrey Ford explained on the film's audio commentary that the experiments performed on Barnes by Zola allowed him to survive the fall shown in the film.) Using information extracted from Zola, the final Hydra stronghold is located, and Rogers leads an attack to stop Schmidt from using weapons of mass destruction on major American cities. Rogers climbs aboard Schmidt's super-bomber as it takes off. During the subsequent fight, the Tesseract is freed from its container, and Schmidt picks it up, opening a portal into space through which he is pulled. The Tesseract burns through the plane and falls into the ocean. Seeing no way to land the plane without risking its weapons detonating, Rogers radios Carter to say goodbye before crashing in the Arctic. After the war ends, Stark recovers the Tesseract from the ocean floor but is unable to locate the aircraft, and Rogers is presumed dead.

Rogers awakens in a 1940s-style hospital room, which he grows suspicious of after hearing a radio broadcast of a 1941 baseball game that he remembers attending in person. He escapes from the room and finds himself in contemporary Times Square, where S.H.I.E.L.D. director Nick Fury informs him that he has been asleep for almost 70 years. In a post-credits scene, Fury approaches Rogers and proposes a mission with worldwide ramifications. (Note: As depicted in The Avengers (2012))

== Cast ==
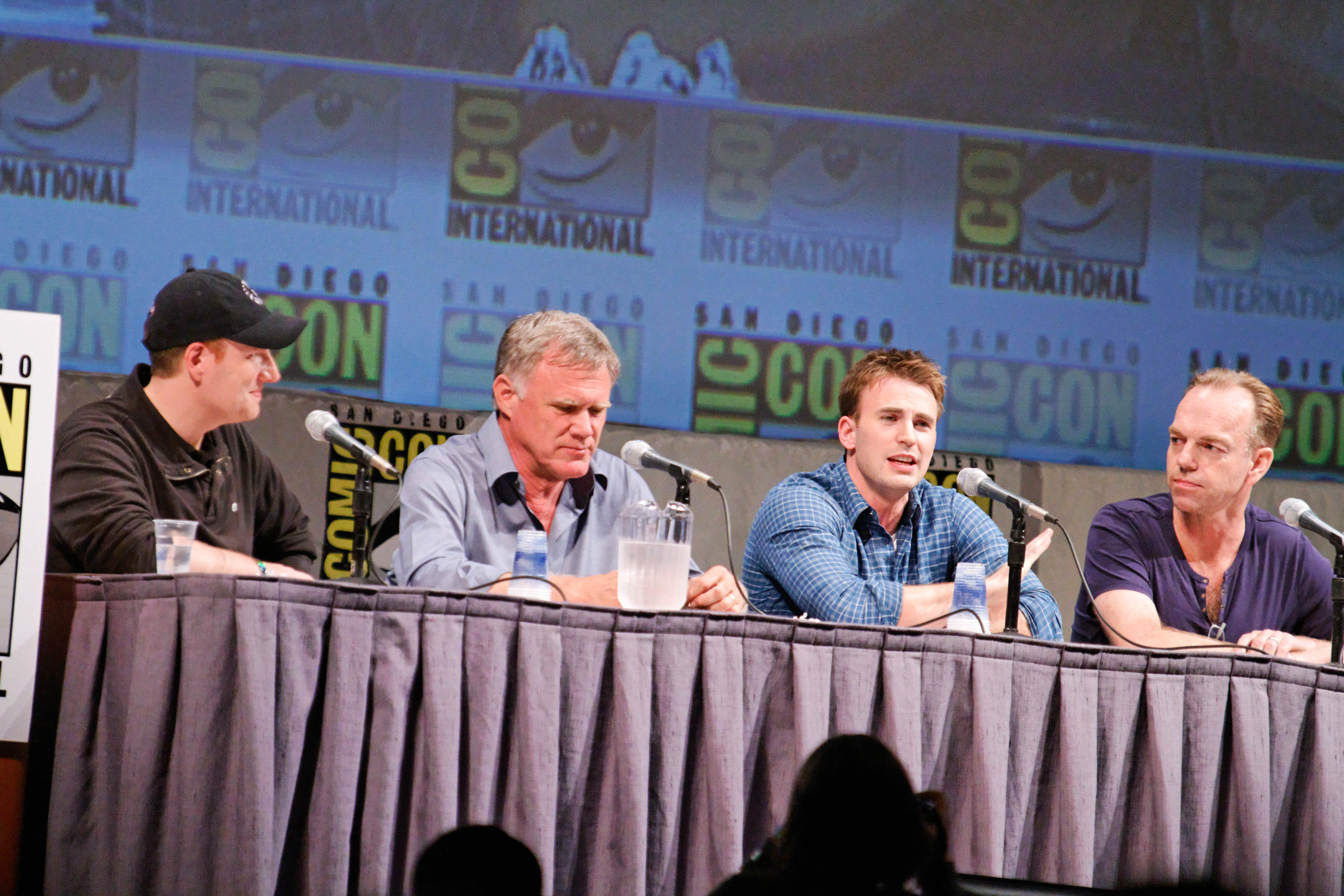
Kevin Feige, Joe Johnston, Chris Evans, and Hugo Weaving at the 2010 San Diego Comic-Con

- Chris Evans as Steve Rogers / Captain America:
  A frail young man who is enhanced to the peak of human ability by an experimental serum in order to aid the United States war effort. Evans, who previously worked with Marvel as the Human Torch in the Fantastic Four film series (2005-2007), said he declined the part three times before signing a six-picture deal with Marvel, explaining that, "At the time, I remember telling a buddy of mine, 'If the movie bombs, I'm f—-ed [sic]. If the movie hits, I'm f—-ed!' I was just scared. I realized my whole decision-making process was fear-based, and you never want to make a decision out of fear. I can't believe I was almost too chicken to play Captain America." Evans ultimately agreed to the role, saying, "I think Marvel is doing a lot of good things right now, and it's a fun character. ... I think the story of Steve Rogers is great. He's a great guy. Even if it [were] just a script about anybody, I would probably want to do it. So it wasn't necessarily about the comic itself." Regarding the extent of the character's abilities Evans remarked, "He would crush the Olympics. Any Olympic sport he's gonna dominate. He can jump higher, run faster, lift stronger weight, but he can be injured. He could roll an ankle and be out for the season. He's not perfect, he's not untouchable. So a lot of the effects, if I'm going to punch someone they're not going to put them on a cable and fly them back 50 feet, but he's going to go down, probably not getting back up, which I think humanizes it. It makes it something that, again, I think everyone can relate to a little bit more, which I really like." Evans did daily high-weight training and stuck to a high-calorie diet to get in shape for the part. Theater actor Leander Deeny was Evans' body double in some shots for Steve Rogers' pre-transformation physique, and also appears as a bartender.
- Tommy Lee Jones as Chester Phillips:
  A colonel in the United States Army and member of the Strategic Scientific Reserve who heads the project to create super soldiers. The character was updated from the comics, where Phillips was the one to recruit Rogers to join Project Rebirth that made him Captain America. Jones described the character as "the one you've seen in a thousand movies: the gruff, skeptical officer overseeing a team of talented, slightly sarcastic, specially talented soldiers".
- Hugo Weaving as Johann Schmidt / Red Skull:
  Adolf Hitler's head of advanced weaponry and commander of the Nazi-backed terrorist organization Hydra whose own plan for world domination involves harnessing the power of the magical object known as the Tesseract. Weaving stated that he patterned Red Skull's accent on those of Werner Herzog and Klaus Maria Brandauer. About the character, Weaving remarked, "I think the major difference between Skull and Cap, they've both had the serum, and the serum seems to augment certain qualities that each of them have. Cap is much more in tune with other people I think. Schmidt is in tune with himself, and his own needs, and his own ego, so I suppose it augments that. From that point of view, they're quite opposite."
- Hayley Atwell as Margaret "Peggy" Carter:
  An officer with the Strategic Scientific Reserve who works with Phillips on the super soldier project. Regarding her preparation for the role, she said, "I'm training at the moment six days a week to make her a bit more military and make it convincing that I could kick butt." About the character, Atwell stated, "I likened her character to that famous Ginger Rogers quote. She can do everything Captain America can do, but backwards and in high heels. She's an English soldier through and through, although she always looks fabulous. She might stand there with a machine-gun shooting Nazis, but she's obviously gone to the loo beforehand and applied a bit of lipstick. She doesn't need to be rescued. That's exciting to me – her strength." She added, "I think she's quite stubborn, a slightly frustrated woman who struggles with being a woman in that time. But more importantly she's a modern woman and she sees something in Captain America that she relates to, and becomes kindred spirits. He treats her very differently to how she's been treated by lots of men, in this kind of dominated world she lives in. So she's very much a fighter."
- Sebastian Stan as James Buchanan "Bucky" Barnes:
  A sergeant in the United States Army, Rogers' best friend, and member of his squad of commandos. Stan signed on for "five or six pictures". He revealed that he did not know anything about the comic books, but watched a lot of documentaries and films about World War II in preparation for the role, calling Band of Brothers "very helpful". About the role, Stan stated, "Steve Rogers and Bucky are both orphans and kind of like brothers. They kind of grow up together and look after each other. It's a very human, relatable thing... I also wanted to look out for how their relationship changes once Steve Rogers becomes Captain America. There's always a competition and they're always one-upping each other. I paid attention to how Bucky is affected by Steve's change and suddenly Steve is this leader".
- Dominic Cooper as Howard Stark:
  The father of Tony Stark who worked on various government projects dating back to the World War II era. About the role, Cooper stated, "It's an opportunity where you can see his future because I know the guy who becomes my son and I see myself as an older version in Iron Man 2 which is great for an actor to have those tools. All I know of him is that he's a fantastic engineer and inventor and a very slick Howard Hughes type that's into aviation and women!"
- Toby Jones as Arnim Zola: A biochemist for the Nazi Party
- Neal McDonough as Timothy "Dum Dum" Dugan:
  A member of Rogers' squad of commandos. McDonough wore the character's signature bowler hat and said he grew Dugan's trademark mustache. About his role in the film he remarked, "Oh, I'm going to see a lot of action. [I'm] the go-to guy, so I'm very happy with that." McDonough was signed on to appear in multiple projects for Marvel, not limited to films.
- Derek Luke as Gabe Jones:
  A member of Rogers' squad of commandos. Luke said he was cast without a script or much of a description of the character. As to why he took the part, "I just believed that Marvel was doing some really great work, great messages in films. The good versus evil and I was just like, 'How can I be down?'"
- Stanley Tucci as Abraham Erskine: The scientist who created the Super Soldier Serum. Tucci said that what drew him to the role was the opportunity to do a German accent, which was something he always wanted to try.

Samuel L. Jackson reprises his role as Nick Fury, the director of the super-spy agency, S.H.I.E.L.D. Kenneth Choi appears as Jim Morita, a Japanese-American member of Rogers' squad of commandos. Choi said he was the last actor to audition for the part and that he read sides from Saving Private Ryan. About his preparation for the role, Choi said, "[I] did a lot of WWII research especially in regards to the 'Nisei' soldiers, or Japanese-American soldiers. I wanted to get as much true, real-life information for a guy like Jim Morita fighting in WWII. I felt that if I had built a factual basis for him, I could then let go and permit the character to exist in the Marvel Universe, which allows for a lot of imaginative circumstances." Bruno Ricci stars as Jacques Dernier, a French member of Rogers' squad of commandos. Ricci auditioned for and got the part while filming the French series The Hawk. JJ Feild appears as James Montgomery Falsworth, a British member of Rogers' squad of commandos. Feild called his part in the film "a very physical job. I play one of the Captain's sidekicks so I've been running around shooting things and blowing things up and trying to look cool for about a year." Additionally, Richard Armitage portrays Heinz Kruger, the Red Skull's top assassin, Lex Shrapnel portrays Gilmore Hodge, a candidate for the super soldier program, Michael Brandon portrays Brandt, a United States Senator who recognizes the PR potential of Captain America. Jeff Goldblum had originally been approached to play the part; he later played Grandmaster in Thor: Ragnarok (2017). David Bradley appears as the church keeper where the Tesseract is held. Natalie Dormer portrays Lorraine, a private who attempts to seduce Rogers, and Jenna Coleman appears as Connie, Bucky's date at the World Expo. Laura Haddock, who would go on to portray Meredith Quill in Guardians of the Galaxy (2014), has a brief appearance as an autograph seeker. Guardians of the Galaxy writer/director James Gunn jokingly claimed that this was Peter Quill's grandmother. Stan Lee has a cameo appearance as a general.

== Production ==
=== Development ===
"[Captain America] wants to serve his country, but he's not this sort of jingoistic American flag-waver. He's just a good person. We make a point of that in the script: Don't change who you are once you go from Steve Rogers to this super-soldier; you have to stay who you are inside, that's really what's important more than your strength and everything... It's also the idea that this is not about America so much as it is about the spirit of doing the right thing. It's an international cast and an international story. It's about what makes America great and what make the rest of the world great too."

— Joe Johnston, director of Captain America: The First Avenger, about the film.

In April 1997, Marvel Studios was in negotiations with Mark Gordon and Gary Levinsohn to produce Captain America, and Larry Wilson and Leslie Bohem were set to write a script. In May 2000, Marvel teamed with Artisan Entertainment to help finance the film. However, a lawsuit arose between Marvel Comics and Joe Simon over the ownership of Captain America copyrights, disrupting the development process of the film. The lawsuit was eventually settled in September 2003. Following the settlement, Marvel was preparing to license the film rights to Warner Bros. until producer David Maisel suggested that the company produce the film themselves. In 2005, Marvel received a $525 million investment from Merrill Lynch, allowing them to independently produce ten films, including Captain America. Paramount Pictures agreed to distribute the film. Originally, the film would stand alone; producer Kevin Feige said "about half" the movie would be set during World War II before moving into the modern day. Producer Avi Arad said, "The biggest opportunity with Captain America is as a man 'out of time', coming back today, looking at our world through the eyes of someone who thought the perfect world was small-town United States. Sixty years go by, and who are we today? Are we better?" He cited the Back to the Future trilogy as an influence, and claimed he had "someone in mind to be the star, and definitely someone in mind to be the director". In February 2006, Arad hoped to have a summer 2008 theatrical release date. Jon Favreau approached Arad to direct the film as a comedy, but he chose to make Iron Man (2008) instead. In April 2006, David Self was hired to write the script. He explained that Captain America was his favorite superhero as a child because "my dad told me I could one day be Captain America". Joe Johnston met with Marvel to discuss directing the film.

Captain America was put on hold during the 2007–2008 Writers Guild of America strike. However, in January 2008, Marvel Entertainment reached an interim comprehensive agreement with the Writers Guild of America that would put writers immediately back to work on various projects that were under the company's development. On May 5, 2008 (after the success of Iron Man), Marvel announced the film The First Avenger: Captain America (the working title) for release on May 6, 2011 (before being pushed back to July 22). Louis Leterrier, director of The Incredible Hulk (2008), viewed some of the concept art being created for the film and was impressed enough to offer his services, but Marvel turned him down. Johnston finally signed on in November 2008, and he hired Christopher Markus & Stephen McFeely to rewrite. Feige cited Johnston's directorial work on October Sky (1999) and The Rocketeer (1991) and his special effects work on the original Star Wars trilogy (1977-1983) to explain why he was an appropriate choice. Raiders of the Lost Ark (1981), in which Johnston worked for the special effects, was an influence on the film, because they hoped the film would not feel like a period piece.

When asked whether anti-US sentiments would affect the film's box office, Feige said, "Marvel is perceived pretty well around the world right now, and I think putting another uber-Marvel hero into the worldwide box office would be a good thing. ... We have to deal with much the same way that Captain America, when thawed from the Arctic ice, entered a world that he didn't recognize," similar to the way Stan Lee and Jack Kirby reintroduced the character in the 1960s. Likewise, Arad noted, "Captain America stands for freedom for all democracies, for hope all around the world. He was created to stop tyranny and the idea of stopping tyranny is important today as it was then. So I think that we will have some interesting challenges but at the end of the day if the movie is terrific and the movie talks to the world, it's not about one place, it's about the world and I think [on] that basis it will be very successful". Later, after the election of US President Barack Obama, Feige commented, "The idea of change and hope has permeated the country, regardless of politics, and that includes Hollywood. Discussions in all our development meetings include the zeitgeist and how it's changed in the last two weeks. Things are being adjusted". The creative team opted to not push the title character to fight any members of the Nazi Party like in a usual World War II movie, as their goal was to depict the conflict through the Marvel Universe's "prism". Although they didn't have problems to feature Nazis in the film, with Feige loving an iconic Captain America cover where the character punches Adolf Hitler out, the team felt that using Hydra as the main antagonists would make them be "true" to the comic book's many aspects. It was because of this that Markus and McFeely found sense in using the Cosmic Cube, already set up in Thor (2011), as the film's MacGuffin, while using a younger Howard Stark as a key ally for the protagonist would bring, according to Markus, "that Tony Starkness".

=== Pre-production ===
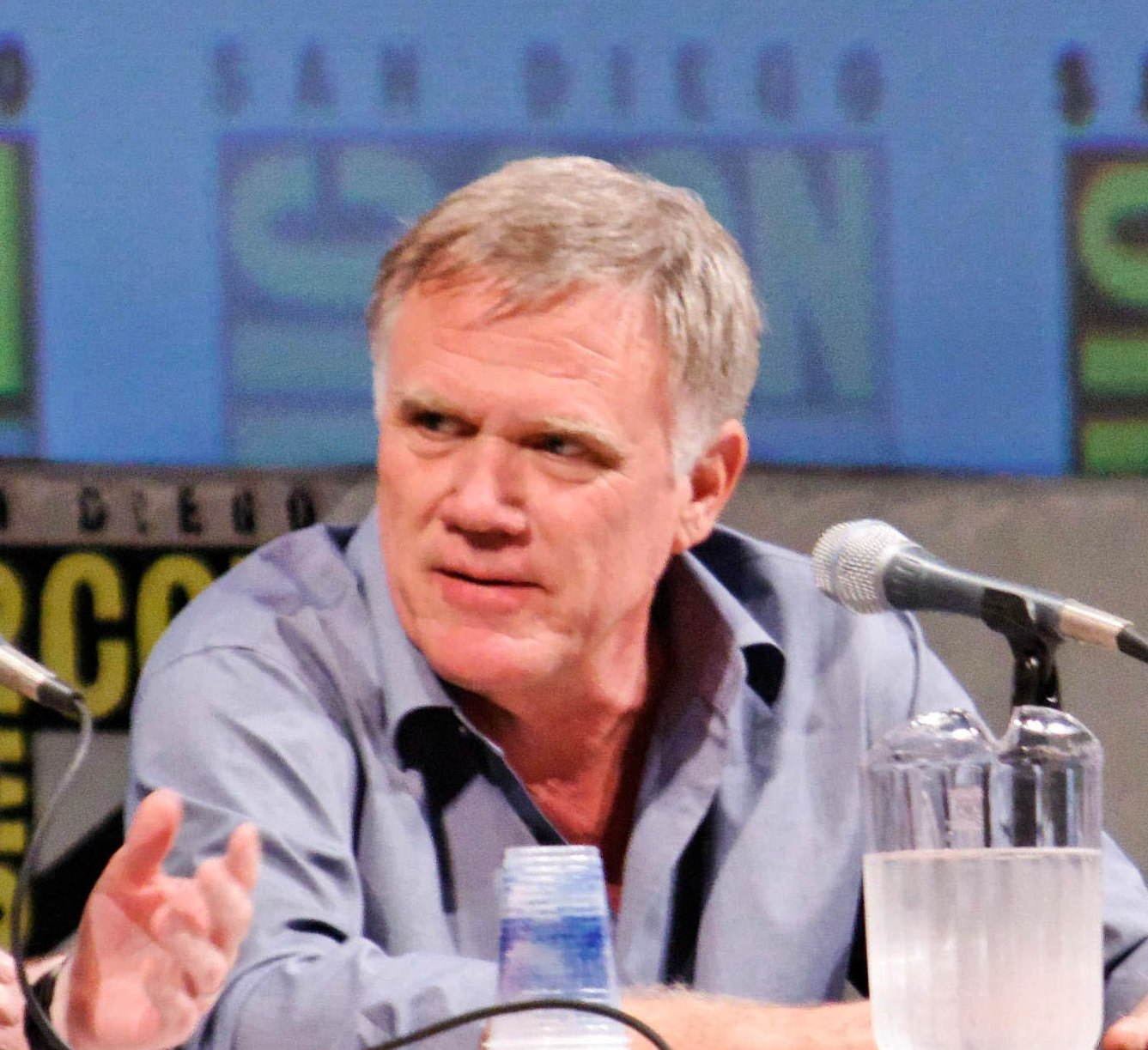
Johnston at the 2010 San Diego Comic-Con

In December 2009, director Joe Johnston indicated that he planned to start filming in April 2010. In a separate interview that month, he described the film's pre-production: "Rick Heinrichs is production-designing and we're set up down in Manhattan Beach, California. ... We have eight or ten really talented artists, and we all just sit around all day and draw pictures and say, 'Hey, wouldn't it be cool if we could do this?' It's that phase of the production where money doesn't matter: 'Let's put all the greatest stuff up on the wall and [then later] see what we can afford.'" The film, he said, will begin "in 1942, 1943" during World War II. "The stuff in the '60s and '70s [comic books] we're sort of avoiding. We're going back to the '40s, and then forward to what they're doing with Captain America now". In February 2010, Johnston stated that the Invaders will appear in "the entire second half" of the film, leading fans to speculate this was the World War II-era Marvel superhero team of that name, and in November, Johnston refuted speculation that the Sub-Mariner, an Invaders team-member in the comics, would be included. Johnston later explained that "the Invaders" had been discussed simply as a possible name for the squad of commandos Captain America leads in the film. Christopher Markus, one of the screenwriters, said the unnamed group was "called the Howling Commandos in the script, but no one says that out loud".

The design as a whole tried to create technology that could be built in the 1940s, though with the added Cube technology in Hydra's case. Abandoned Nazi projects or actual vehicles from the period were used as inspiration. Daniel Simon, who was previously responsible for many vehicle designs in Tron: Legacy (2010), was appointed Lead Vehicle Designer. Director Johnston cited Simon's book Cosmic Motors as a reason to trust his influence, saying "he's sort of the guy I wanted to be when I was designing stuff for Star Wars". The Red Skull's car, for instance, was based on two Mercedes-Benz vehicles from the 1930s, the 540K and the G4.

In March 2010, it was reported that Chris Evans was cast as Captain America and Hugo Weaving as the Red Skull; Marvel Studios confirmed the latter in May. John Krasinski, Channing Tatum, Chace Crawford, Ryan Phillippe, Garrett Hedlund, Michael Cassidy, Patrick Flueger, Scott Porter, Wilson Bethel, Mike Vogel, Dane Cook, Ryan McPartlin, Ethan Peck, Zachary Levi, Glen Powell, Jensen Ackles, Wyatt Russell, and Chris Pratt were also considered for the role of Captain America. Casting director Sarah Halley Finn said Evans was cast in part because of his relatable humility alongside a vulnerability and strength that could portray both "skinny" Steve Rogers and Captain America. In April 2010, Sebastian Stan, who also originally auditioned for the title role, was cast as Bucky Barnes. Stan was contracted for multiple films. When casting Stan, Feige believed he would be a good Barnes but a "great" Winter Soldier in future films. Also in April, Marvel announced that Hayley Atwell had been cast as Peggy Carter, and that the film's name had been changed from The First Avenger: Captain America to Captain America: The First Avenger. Keira Knightley, Alice Eve, and Emily Blunt were also considered for the role of Peggy Carter. The next day it was reported that Joss Whedon would be rewriting the script as part of his negotiation to write and direct The Avengers (2012). Whedon said in August, "I just got to make some character connections. The structure of the thing was really tight and I loved it, but there were a couple of opportunities to find his voice a little bit —and some of the other characters' — and make the connections so that you understood exactly why he wanted to be who he wanted to be. And progressing through the script to flesh it out a little bit". Samuel L. Jackson revealed in an interview that he would reprise his role as Nick Fury in the film.

In May, Toby Jones entered final negotiations to play Arnim Zola. Iron Man director Jon Favreau said a younger Howard Stark would appear in the film, played by Dominic Cooper. Atwell revealed that Tommy Lee Jones would have a role in the film. By June, Neal McDonough was in talks to play Dum Dum Dugan. Four days later, he confirmed he was taking the part. The same day, Stanley Tucci joined the cast as Dr. Abraham Erskine, the scientist who created the super-soldier serum.

=== Filming ===
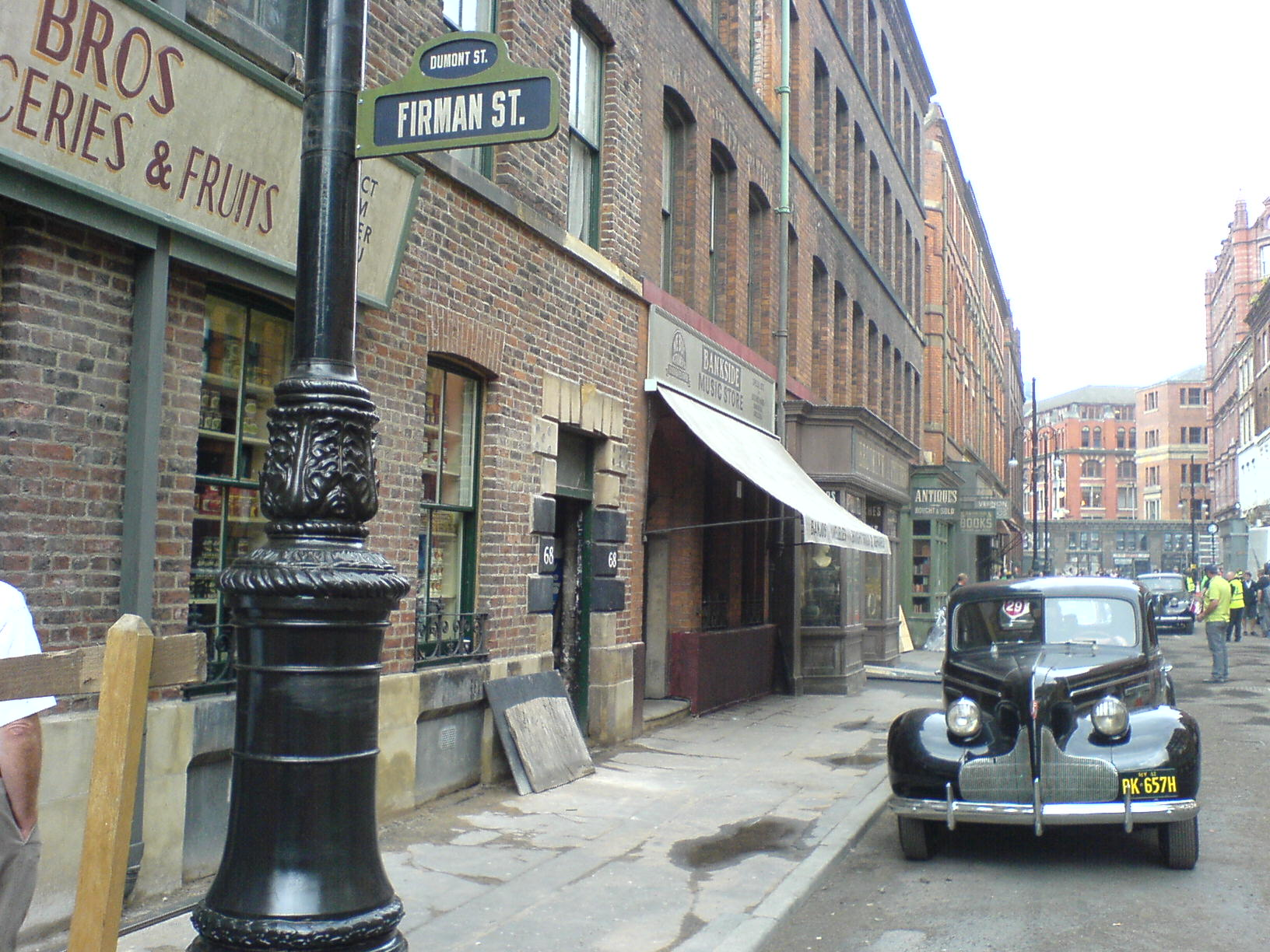
Photo taken in Manchester on the set of Captain America: The First Avenger

Principal photography began on June 28, 2010, with the working title FrostBite. On the same day, Marvel confirmed that Lee Jones had been cast to play US Army Colonel Chester Phillips. The next day Marvel confirmed that Cooper would portray the younger version of Howard Stark, the character played by John Slattery in Iron Man 2 (2010). It was announced that the film would shoot in London in late July and was expected to include scenes featuring key London landmarks. War scenes were filmed in September at the former Royal Navy Propellant Factory in the Welsh village of Caerwent. Filming was scheduled to take place that month in the Northern Quarter of Manchester, where parts of Alfie (2004) and Sherlock Holmes (2009) had been shot, followed by the Stanley Dock area of Liverpool, both doubling for the period's Lower East Side of Manhattan. Further scenes were scheduled to be shot in Liverpool's Albert Dock. Johnston included a scene of a technology fair that includes in passing a display case containing the 1940s android superhero known as the original Human Torch, another character, like Captain America, in comics published by Marvel Comics' predecessor, Timely Comics.

Some filming also took place at Pinewood Studios, with Pinewood's A Stage, their South Dock, and their Underwater Stage all being used by the crew. Six months of filming also occurred at Shepperton Studios, with nine stages being used.

In July 2010, Marvel Studios head Kevin Feige said that both this film and Thor would be released in 3D. Johnston did a one-day test shooting with a 3D rig, rather than shooting in 2D and converting, and found it "a nightmare" due to bulky gear, calibration issues and restricted filmmaking options. Nevertheless, he said he believes 3D is "a new challenge and it's exciting". Feige insisted that the conversion would not compromise the film's image quality, as the decision to release the film in 3D was made early in development, and that "an unprecedented amount of time" would be devoted to the conversion process, to render all the film's visual effects in true 3D. In November 2010, Stanley Tucci stated that he had completed filming his scenes and that the rest of the production would wrap in about three weeks.

=== Post-production ===
Evans as pre-serum Steve Rogers before (top) and after (bottom) he was visually reduced

In February 2011, it was announced that Alan Silvestri had been chosen to compose the film score. In March 2011, it was reported that Captain America: The First Avenger would be undergoing reshoots in the United Kingdom and in Los Angeles in April 2011. Writer Eric Pearson, who was part of Marvel Studios' writers program, did uncredited work creating lines of dialogue for Evans to say during automated dialogue replacement (ADR) to help make the film cohesive. A scene was also filmed in New York City's Times Square on April 23, 2011.

The film features nearly 1,600 visual effects shots, which were split between thirteen different companies. To achieve the appearance of the skinny, pre-serum Steve Rogers, director Joe Johnston stated that he used two major techniques:

Most of the shots were done by an L.A. company called LOLA that specializes in digital "plastic surgery". The technique involved shrinking Chris in all dimensions. We shot each skinny Steve scene at least four times; once like a normal scene with Chris and his fellow actors in the scene, once with Chris alone in front of a green screen so his element could be reduced digitally, again with everyone in the scene but with Chris absent so that the shrunken Steve could be re-inserted into the scene, and finally with a body double mimicking Chris's actions in case the second technique were required. When Chris had to interact with other characters in the scene, we had to either lower Chris or raise the other actors on apple boxes or elevated walkways to make skinny Steve shorter in comparison. For close-ups, Chris' fellow actors had to look at marks on his chin that represented where his eyes would be after the shrinking process, and Chris had to look at marks on the tops of the actor's head to represent their eyes. ... The second technique involved grafting Chris's head onto the body double. This technique was used mostly when Chris was sitting or lying down, or when a minimum of physical acting was required....

Captain America's shield, which serves as both a defensive tool and a weapon, came in four types: metal, fiberglass, rubber, and computer graphics (CG). Prop master Barry Gibbs specified that "We had the 'hero shield,' which was made of aluminum, for our beauty shots [and] close-up work. We then created a lighter shield that was aluminum-faced with a fiberglass back, for use on a daily basis. ... And then we had a stunt shield made of polyurethane, which is sort of a synthetic rubber ... and we made an ultrasoft one we put on [Evans'] back, so that if there were an accident, it wouldn't hurt him". Visual effects supervisor Christopher Townsend said Evans "would practice swinging the practical shield so he knew the arc and the speed at which he should move. We would take the shield from him and shoot the scene with him miming it. Then we would add in a CG shield".

Hugo Weaving, who portrayed the Red Skull, wore a latex mask conceived by prosthetic makeup designer David White. The visual effects team had to manipulate his face considerably, as the mask was bulky and they wanted to make it look like tight skin wrapped around a very bony structure. They thinned out Weaving's cheeks and lower lip, hollowed out his eyes, and removed his eyelashes and nose to make him appear more like the Red Skull character.

Closing credits were created by visual effects firm Rok!t by means of 3D and stereoscopic processing that used iconic American war propaganda, such as James Montgomery Flagg's Uncle Sam recruitment poster from World War I and J. Howard Miller's "We Can Do It!" poster from World War II.

== Music ==
The soundtrack album for Captain America: The First Avenger includes the original score by Alan Silvestri, as well as an original song, "Star Spangled Man", with music composed by Alan Menken and lyrics by David Zippel. The soundtrack was recorded at Air Studios in London and released by Walt Disney Records on July 19, 2011.

== Marketing ==
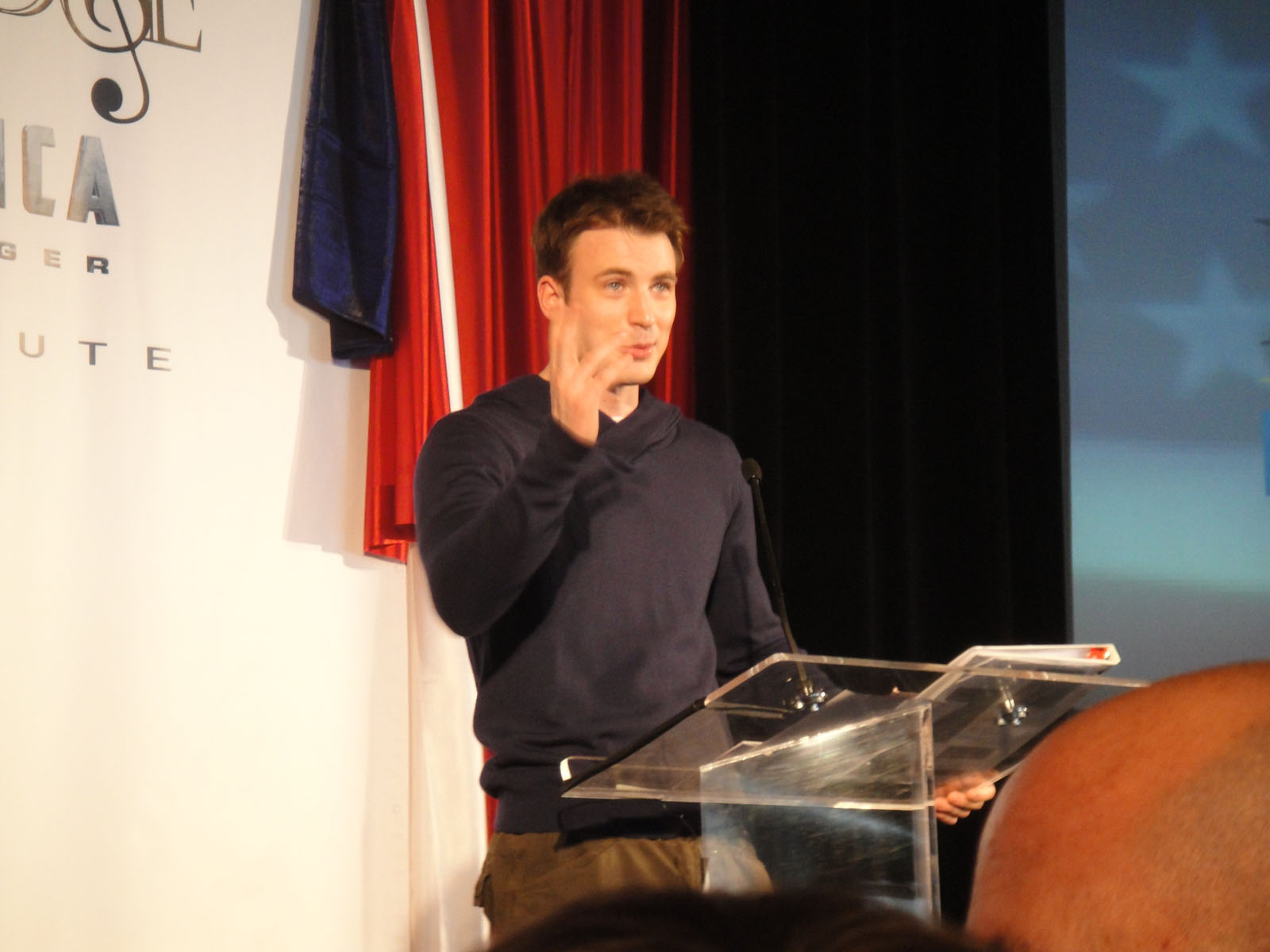
Evans promoting the film at Comic-Con in July 2011 during the Military Salute

At the 2010 San Diego Comic-Con, some footage that had been shot in the previous week was shown at the San Diego Convention Center. The first television advertisement aired during Super Bowl XLV on the Fox network in the United States. Paramount paid $3 million to run the 30-second advertisement. The first full trailer was released in March 2011. In May 2011, the USO girls from the film performed aboard the USS Intrepid at the Intrepid Sea-Air-Space Museum as a part of the 2011 Fleet Week celebration in New York City. In June 2011, Dunkin' Donuts and Baskin-Robbins teamed with Marvel to search for real-life super-soldiers. The contest sought nominations for veterans or active U.S. servicepersons making a difference where they live or serve. In July 2011, Paramount Pictures promoted the film during an Independence Day celebration hosted by the Chicago White Sox. Promotional partners include Harley-Davidson, Dunkin' Donuts and Baskin-Robbins.

In February 2011, Marvel Comics launched the eight-issue digital comic Captain America: First Vengeance, on the same day as the first trailer aired. Written by Fred Van Lente and featuring a rotation of artists, the story is set in the Marvel Cinematic Universe. Each of the eight issues focuses on a specific character from the movie, heroes and villains alike, and what brought them to the point where the movie begins.

Sega announced a video game tie-in titled Captain America: Super Soldier, that was released on July 19, 2011, for the Xbox 360, PlayStation 3, Wii, and Nintendo DS. Marvel released the mobile game, Captain America: Sentinel of Liberty, in July 2011. A toy line was released as well.

== Release ==
=== Theatrical ===
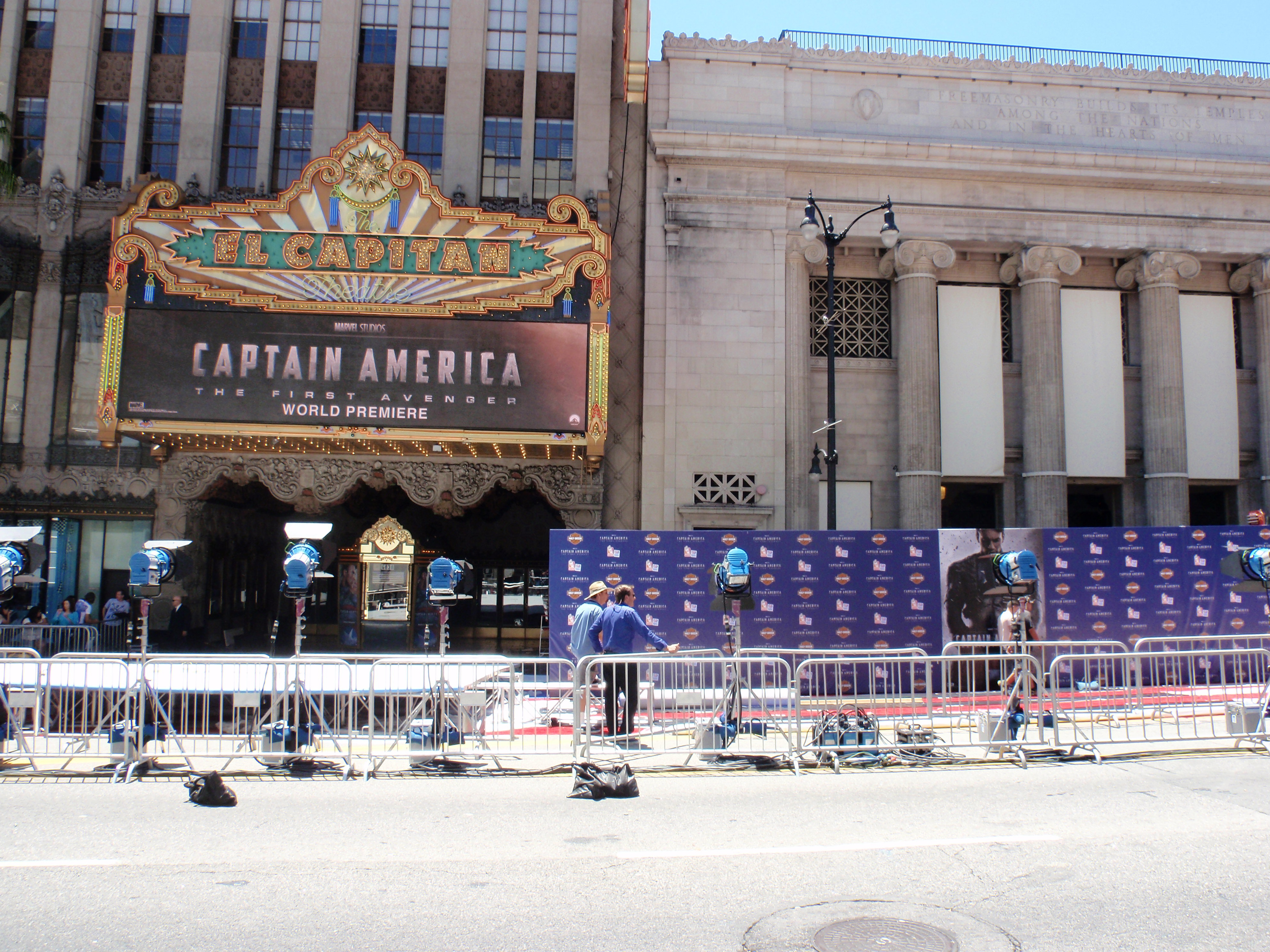
El Capitan Theatre in Hollywood, California before the movie's world premiere

The world premiere of Captain America: The First Avenger was held on July 19, 2011, at the El Capitan Theatre in Hollywood, California. The film was screened at San Diego Comic-Con on July 21, 2011. It was commercially released in the United States and Canada on July 22, 2011. Captain America: The First Avenger is part of Phase One of the MCU.

Paramount opted against altering the American-centric title when distributing to foreign territories, instead offering international markets a choice between the official title and the alternative The First Avenger. Many international distributors chose to retain the original title, believing the franchise name to be more identifiable than the alternative, and that the latter would risk losing ticket sales. Three countries chose the alternative title: Russia, South Korea, and Ukraine. An "insider" speaking to The New York Times explained that the name change in these countries stemmed from cultural and political concerns, though Marvel and Paramount both declined to state an official reason. In July 2011, it was thought that the film would not be released in China because of a policy limiting the number of foreign films screened there each year, but it eventually opened there in the second weekend of September.

Days before the film's release, a teaser trailer for The Avengers that served as a post-credits scene of Captain America: The First Avenger was briefly leaked online. Entertainment Weekly speculated it came from a preview screening and described the footage as "shaky, fuzzy, flickering and obviously filmed on a cell phone". Captain America: The First Avenger was formatted and screened in IMAX for the first time on August 31, 2018, as part of Marvel Studios' 10-year anniversary IMAX festival.

=== Home media ===
Captain America: The First Avenger was released by Paramount Home Entertainment on Blu-ray, Blu-ray 3D and DVD on October 25, 2011. The three-disc set includes the film on Blu-ray in high-definition 3D and in high definition 2D, as well as on standard definition DVD with a digital copy. The two-disc Blu-ray/DVD combo pack includes a high-definition presentation of the film and a standard-definition presentation with a digital copy. Both sets include over an hour of bonus material, including the short film A Funny Thing Happened on the Way to Thor's Hammer, a sneak peek of The Avengers, six behind-the-scenes featurettes, and deleted scenes with commentary by director Joe Johnston, director of photography Shelly Johnson and editor Jeff Ford. In its first week of release, Captain America: The First Avenger topped the Blu-ray and DVD sales charts, selling 1.54 million Blu-ray units and 726,000 DVD units and making a combined total of $52.6 million.

The film was also collected in a 10-disc box set titled "Marvel Cinematic Universe: Phase One – Avengers Assembled" which includes all of the Phase One films in the Marvel Cinematic Universe. It was released on April 2, 2013. Captain America: The First Avenger was released by Walt Disney Studios Home Entertainment on Ultra HD Blu-ray on February 26, 2019.

== Reception ==
=== Box office ===
Captain America: The First Avenger earned $176.7 million in North America and $193.9 million internationally, for a worldwide total of $370.6 million.

Captain America: The First Avenger opened on July 22, 2011, in the United States and earned $4 million in midnight showings, outgrossing other 2011 original superhero films like Thor and Green Lantern as well as the prequel X-Men: First Class, which all made between $3.25 million and $3.5 million in Friday midnights. On Friday, the film opened at the number one spot at the American and Canadian box office with $25.7 million. It then went on to make $65.1 million in what was the second highest-grossing opening weekend for a superhero film in 2011, behind Thor ($65.7 million). At the time of its release, Captain America: The First Avenger became the third highest-grossing motion picture set during the World War II era, after Saving Private Ryan and Pearl Harbor.

=== Critical response ===
The review aggregator Rotten Tomatoes reported an approval rating of 80%, with an average score of 7/10, based on 274 reviews. The website's consensus reads, "With plenty of pulpy action, a pleasantly retro vibe, and a handful of fine performances, Captain America is solidly old-fashioned blockbuster entertainment." Metacritic, which assigns a weighted average score, rated the film 66 out of 100 based on 43 reviews from critics indicating "generally favorable" reviews. Audiences polled by CinemaScore gave the film an average grade of "A−" on an A+ to F scale.

Roger Moore of the Orlando Sentinel gave Captain America: The First Avenger a positive review, saying, "Johnston has delivered a light, clever and deftly balanced adventure picture with real lump in the throat nostalgia, with Nazis – who make the best villains, and with loving references to Star Wars and Raiders of the Lost Ark.'" Roger Ebert of the Chicago Sun-Times remarked, "I enjoyed the movie. I appreciated the 1940s period settings and costumes, which were a break with the usual generic cityscapes. I admired the way that director Joe Johnston propelled the narrative. I got a sense of a broad story, rather than the impression of a series of sensational set pieces. If Marvel is wise, it will take this and Iron Man as its templates". A. O. Scott of The New York Times declared it "pretty good fun".

Karina Longworth of The Village Voice gave the film a negative review, calling it "[A] hokey, hacky, two-hour-plus exercise in franchise transition/price gouging, complete with utterly unnecessary post-converted 3-D". Peter Debruge of Variety said, "Captain America: The First Avenger plays like a by-the-numbers prequel for Marvel Studios' forthcoming The Avengers movie". Kirk Honeycutt of The Hollywood Reporter had mixed feelings about the film, writing, "As the last Marvel prequel that includes two Iron Man and Incredible Hulk movies before next summer's The Avengers, this one feels perhaps a little too simplistic and routine".

=== Accolades ===
Year	Award	Category	Recipients	Result	Ref.
2011	Teen Choice Awards	Choice Summer: Movie	Captain America: The First Avenger	Nominated	
2011	Teen Choice Awards	Choice Summer Movie Star: Male	Chris Evans	Nominated	
2011	Scream Awards	The Ultimate Scream	Captain America: The First Avenger	Nominated	
2011	Scream Awards	Best Science Fiction Movie	Captain America: The First Avenger	Nominated	
2011	Scream Awards	Best Science Fiction Actress	Hayley Atwell	Nominated	
2011	Scream Awards	Best Science Fiction Actor	Chris Evans	Nominated	
2011	Scream Awards	Best Villain	Hugo Weaving as Red Skull	Nominated	
2011	Scream Awards	Best Superhero	Chris Evans as Captain America	Won	
2011	Scream Awards	Best Supporting Actor	Tommy Lee Jones	Nominated	
2011	Scream Awards	Breakout Performance – Female	Hayley Atwell	Nominated	
2011	Scream Awards	Fight Scene of the Year	Final Battle: Captain America vs. Red Skull	Nominated	
2011	Scream Awards	Best 3-D Movie	Captain America: The First Avenger	Nominated	
2011	Scream Awards	Best Comic Book Movie	Captain America: The First Avenger	Nominated	
2012	BMI Film & TV Awards	Film Music Award	Alan Silvestri	Won	
2012	People's Choice Awards	Favorite Movie Superhero	Chris Evans	Nominated	
2012	Visual Effects Society Awards	Outstanding Visual Effects in a Visual Effects-Driven Feature Motion Picture	Charlie Noble, Mark Soper, Christopher Townsend, and Edson Williams	Nominated	
2012	Visual Effects Society Awards	Outstanding Compositing in a Feature Motion Picture	Casey Allen, Trent Claus, Brian Hajek, and Cliff Welsh	Won	
2012	Empire Awards	Best Sci-Fi/Fantasy	Captain America: The First Avenger	Nominated	
2012	MTV Movie Awards	Best Hero	Captain America	Nominated	
2012	Saturn Awards	Best Science Fiction Film	Captain America: The First Avenger	Nominated	
2012	Saturn Awards	Best Actor	Chris Evans	Nominated	
2012	Saturn Awards	Best Supporting Actor	Stanley Tucci	Nominated	
2012	Saturn Awards	Best Music	Alan Silvestri	Nominated	
2012	Saturn Awards	Best Production Design	Rick Heinrichs	Nominated	
2012	Saturn Awards	Best Costume	Anne B. Sheppard	Nominated	
2012	Saturn Awards	Best Special Effects	Mark Soper, Christopher Townsend, Paul Corbould	Nominated	

== Future ==
=== Sequels ===
==== Captain America: The Winter Soldier ====
A sequel, Captain America: The Winter Soldier, directed by Anthony and Joseph Russo, was released on April 4, 2014. Evans, Stan, Atwell, Toby Jones, and Jackson reprise their roles as Captain America, Bucky Barnes, Peggy Carter, Arnim Zola, and Nick Fury, respectively. They are joined by Scarlett Johansson, Anthony Mackie, Cobie Smulders, Frank Grillo, Emily VanCamp, and Robert Redford as Natasha Romanoff / Black Widow, Sam Wilson / Falcon, Maria Hill, Brock Rumlow, Sharon Carter, and Alexander Pierce, respectively.

==== Captain America: Civil War ====
Captain America: Civil War was released on May 6, 2016, and again is directed by the Russo brothers. Evans, Johansson, Stan, Mackie, Grillo and VanCamp reprise their roles from The Winter Soldier, and they are joined by Robert Downey Jr. as Tony Stark / Iron Man, Paul Bettany as Vision, Jeremy Renner as Clint Barton / Hawkeye, Don Cheadle as James "Rhodey" Rhodes / War Machine, Elizabeth Olsen as Wanda Maximoff / Scarlet Witch, Paul Rudd as Scott Lang / Ant-Man and William Hurt as Thaddeus "Thunderbolt" Ross all reprising roles from previous MCU films. Chadwick Boseman, Tom Holland and Daniel Brühl also star as T'Challa / Black Panther, Peter Parker / Spider-Man and Helmut Zemo, respectively.

=== Marvel One-Shot ===
In September 2013, Marvel released the One-Shot short film, Agent Carter, on Iron Man 3's home media release, featuring Atwell reprising her role as Peggy Carter. Set a year after The First Avenger, the film sees Carter on an SSR mission post-World War II.

== See also ==
- Captain America in film
- "What If... Captain Carter Were the First Avenger?", an episode of the MCU television series What If...? that reimagines the events of this film
