= Trent Claus =

Visual effects supervisor

Trent Claus is a visual effects supervisor with Lola VFX. He is known for his work on the Marvel Cinematic Universe (MCU), having contributed to 21 of their films.

== Early life ==
Originally from Nebraska, he started his first job in a comic book store at the age of 13. In college, he obtained a Bachelor of Fine Arts degree from the University of Nebraska–Lincoln, and then entered the film industry as a matte painter.

== Career ==
Claus started his career as a matte painter, with work on such films as Iron Man, The Love Guru, and Jumper.

He then transitioned into compositing, working on such films as Blade Runner (The Final Cut), The Curious Case of Benjamin Button, Iron Man 2, and The Social Network. For his work on Captain America: The First Avenger, he was awarded the Visual Effects Society award for Outstanding Compositing in a Feature Motion Picture. In 2020 he was nominated for Outstanding Compositing once again for the film Captain Marvel.

As a visual effects supervisor, he has been responsible for most of the "aging" and "de-ageing" effects of the Marvel Cinematic Universe. In Avengers: Endgame, he supervised an estimated 200 age-manipulation shots, including characters played by Stan Lee and Michael Douglas, as well as Chris Evans's Captain America character's transformation into an old man. For the film Captain Marvel, he de-aged Samuel L. Jackson's character 25 years for the entire length of the film. He de-aged Michael Douglas's character Hank Pym in multiple films, including Ant-Man and Ant-Man and the Wasp (along with Laurence Fishburne and Michelle Pfeiffer).

For the film Avengers: Age of Ultron, Claus developed the look and design of the character Vision (played by Paul Bettany), from the plates and layers that make up Vision's face, to the mechanical diaphragms in his eyes. He revisited the character again in the film Captain America: Civil War, delivering over 200 shots, 80 of which were Vision.

In 2019, he became a member of the Academy of Motion Picture Arts and Sciences.

== Selected filmography ==
- The Mandalorian (2020)
- Avengers: Endgame (2019)
- Captain Marvel (2019)
- Solo: A Star Wars Story (2018)
- Avengers: Infinity War (2018)
- Captain America: Civil War (2016)
- Ant-Man (2015)
- Avengers: Age of Ultron (2015)
- Guardians of the Galaxy (2014)
- Life of Pi (2012)
- Prometheus (2012)
- The Avengers (2012)
- Captain America: The First Avenger (2011)
- The Social Network (2010)
- Star Trek (2009)
- The Curious Case of Benjamin Button (2008)
- Speed Racer (2008)
- Iron Man (2008)
- Blade Runner - The Final Cut (2007)
