= Captain America: Civil War =

2016 Marvel Studios film

- Theatrical release poster
- Directed by: Anthony Russo; Joe Russo
- Screenplay by: Christopher Markus; Stephen McFeely
- Based on: Captain America by: Joe Simon; Jack Kirby
- Produced by: Kevin Feige
- Starring: Chris Evans; Robert Downey Jr.; Scarlett Johansson; Sebastian Stan; Anthony Mackie; Don Cheadle; Jeremy Renner; Chadwick Boseman; Paul Bettany; Elizabeth Olsen; Paul Rudd; Emily VanCamp; Marisa Tomei; Tom Holland; Frank Grillo; Martin Freeman; William Hurt; Daniel Brühl
- Cinematography: Trent Opaloch
- Edited by: Jeffrey Ford; Matthew Schmidt
- Music by: Henry Jackman
- Production company: Marvel Studios
- Distributed by: Walt Disney Studios Motion Pictures
- Release dates: April 12, 2016 (Dolby Theatre); May 6, 2016 (United States)
- Running time: 147 minutes
- Country: United States
- Language: English
- Budget: $250 million
- Box office: $1.155 billion

Captain America: Civil War is a 2016 American superhero film based on the Marvel Comics character Captain America. Produced by Marvel Studios and distributed by Walt Disney Studios Motion Pictures, it is the sequel to Captain America: The First Avenger (2011) and Captain America: The Winter Soldier (2014), and the 13th film in the Marvel Cinematic Universe (MCU). The film was directed by Anthony and Joe Russo from a screenplay by the writing team of Christopher Markus and Stephen McFeely, and stars Chris Evans as Steve Rogers / Captain America alongside an ensemble cast including Robert Downey Jr., Scarlett Johansson, Sebastian Stan, Anthony Mackie, Don Cheadle, Jeremy Renner, Chadwick Boseman, Paul Bettany, Elizabeth Olsen, Paul Rudd, Emily VanCamp, Marisa Tomei, Tom Holland, Frank Grillo, Martin Freeman, William Hurt, and Daniel Brühl. In Captain America: Civil War, disagreement over international oversight of the Avengers fractures the team into two opposing factions—one led by Steve Rogers and the other by Tony Stark (Downey).

Development of Civil War began in late 2013 when Markus and McFeely began writing the screenplay, which borrows concepts from the 2006 comic book storyline "Civil War" while also focusing on story and character elements from the previous Captain America films to conclude the trilogy. Following positive reactions to The Winter Soldier, the Russo brothers were brought back to direct in early 2014. The film's title and premise were revealed in October 2014, along with Downey's involvement as Stark; additional cast members joined in the following months. Principal photography began in April 2015 at Pinewood Atlanta Studios in Fayette County, Georgia. It continued in the Metro Atlanta area before concluding in Germany in August 2015, with the film being the first to use IMAX's digital 2D cameras (for the film's central airport fight sequence). Visual effects were provided by nearly 20 different studios.

Captain America: Civil War held its world premiere at the Dolby Theatre in Hollywood, Los Angeles, on April 12, 2016, and was released in the United States on May 6, as the first film in Phase Three of the MCU. The film was a commercial success, grossing over $1.1 billion worldwide, becoming the highest-grossing film of 2016, and received positive reviews from critics, with praise for the performances (particularly Evans and Downey), action sequences, and themes. A fourth film, Captain America: Brave New World (2025), is a continuation of Marvel Studios' Disney+ series The Falcon and the Winter Soldier (2021), following Mackie's Sam Wilson as Captain America.

== Plot ==
In 1991, the brainwashed super-soldier James "Bucky" Barnes is dispatched from a Hydra base in Siberia to intercept an automobile carrying a case of super-soldier serum. In the present day, approximately one year after Ultron is defeated by the Avengers in the nation of Sokovia, (Note: As depicted in Avengers: Age of Ultron (2015)) Steve Rogers, Natasha Romanoff, Sam Wilson, and Wanda Maximoff stop Brock Rumlow from stealing a biological weapon from a lab in Lagos. Rumlow blows himself up, attempting to kill Rogers. Maximoff telekinetically diverts the explosion, accidentally destroying a nearby building and killing several Wakandan humanitarian workers in the process.

Thaddeus Ross, the U.S. Secretary of State, informs the Avengers that the United Nations (UN) is preparing to pass the Sokovia Accords, which will establish a UN panel to oversee and control the team. The Avengers are divided: Tony Stark supports oversight because of his role in Ultron's creation and Sokovia's devastation, while Rogers has more faith in his own judgment than that of politicians. Meanwhile, Helmut Zemo tracks down and kills Barnes's old Hydra handler, stealing a book containing the trigger words that activate Barnes's brainwashing. At a UN conference in Vienna where the Accords are to be ratified, a bomb kills King T'Chaka of Wakanda. Security footage indicates the bomber is Barnes, whom T'Chaka's son, T'Challa, vows to kill. Informed by Sharon Carter of Barnes's whereabouts and the authorities' intentions to kill him, Rogers decides to try to bring in Barnes—his childhood friend and war comrade—himself. Rogers and Wilson track Barnes to Bucharest and attempt to protect him from T'Challa and the authorities, but all four, including T'Challa, are apprehended by the Bucharest police and James Rhodes.

Impersonating a psychiatrist sent to interview Barnes, Zemo recites the words to activate Barnes's brainwashing. He questions Barnes, then sends him on a rampage to cover his own escape. Rogers stops Barnes and sneaks him away. When Barnes regains his senses, he explains that Zemo is the real Vienna bomber and wanted the location of the Siberian Hydra base, where other brainwashed "Winter Soldiers" are kept in cryogenic stasis. Unwilling to wait for authorization to apprehend Zemo, Rogers and Wilson go rogue, and recruit Maximoff, Clint Barton, and Scott Lang to their cause. With Ross's permission, Stark assembles a team composed of Romanoff, T'Challa, Rhodes, Vision, and Peter Parker to capture the renegades. Stark's team intercepts Rogers's group at Leipzig/Halle Airport, where they fight until Romanoff allows Rogers and Barnes to escape. As Rogers and Barnes are escaping, Rhodes is inadvertently shot down by Vision, and becomes partially paralyzed. The rest of Rogers's team is captured and detained at the Raft prison, and Romanoff goes into exile.

Stark discovers evidence that Barnes was framed by Zemo and convinces Wilson to give him Rogers's destination. Without informing Ross, Stark goes to the Siberian Hydra facility and strikes a truce with Rogers and Barnes, unaware that they were secretly followed by T'Challa. They find that the other super-soldiers have been killed by Zemo, who then shows them footage that reveals that the automobile Barnes had intercepted in 1991 contained Stark's parents, whom Barnes subsequently killed. Enraged that Rogers kept this from him, Stark turns on them both, leading to an intense fight, in which Stark destroys Barnes's robotic arm, and Rogers disables Stark's armor. Rogers departs with Barnes, leaving his shield behind. Satisfied that he has avenged his family's deaths in Sokovia from the Avengers' actions by successfully fracturing them, Zemo attempts suicide, but he is stopped by T'Challa and taken to the authorities.

In the aftermath, Stark provides Rhodes with exoskeletal leg braces that allow him to walk again, while Rogers breaks his allies out of the Raft. In a mid-credits scene, Barnes, granted asylum in Wakanda, chooses to return to cryogenic sleep until a cure for his brainwashing is found. In a post-credits scene, Parker explores the features of the web shooters built for him by Stark.

== Cast ==
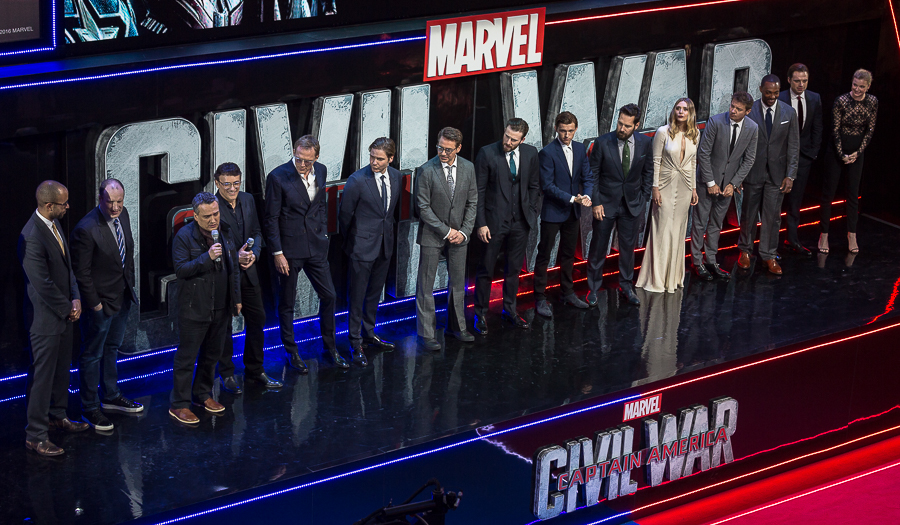
(L-R) Nate Moore, Kevin Feige, the Russo brothers, Paul Bettany, Daniel Brühl, Robert Downey Jr., Chris Evans, Tom Holland, Paul Rudd, Elizabeth Olsen, Jeremy Renner, Anthony Mackie, Sebastian Stan, and Emily VanCamp at the London premiere

- Chris Evans as Steve Rogers / Captain America:
  The leader of a faction of Avengers against regulation; a World War II veteran who was enhanced to the peak of human physicality and frozen in suspended animation, before waking up in the modern world. Director Anthony Russo described Captain America's character arc in the film as taking "him from the most ra-ra company man" to someone who is "a somewhat willing propagandist" to "an insurgent" at the end of the film. Unlike the comics' Civil War, the film was never going to kill Rogers, as the directors thought that was "an easy ending ... The more difficult and more interesting place to leave a family fight is: can these important relationships ever be repaired? Is this family broken permanently?" Evans's training regimen to get in shape for the role included weight lifting, which consisted of "the classic bodyweight and bodybuilding stuff", gymnastics and plyometrics, while staying away from cardio-based exercises, along with a high-protein diet. His costume in the film received "subtle changes to all the details and cut" as well as its color, becoming a combination of the stealth suit from The Winter Soldier and the Avengers: Age of Ultron suit.
- Robert Downey Jr. as Tony Stark / Iron Man:
  The leader of a faction of Avengers in support of regulation; a self-described genius, billionaire, playboy, and philanthropist with electromechanical suits of armor of his own invention. Anthony Russo said that Stark's egomania allowed the writers "to bring him to a point in his life where he was willing to submit to an authority, where he felt it was the right thing to do." Joe Russo added that because of the visions Stark saw in Age of Ultron, he now has a guilt complex which "drives him to make very specific decisions," calling his emotional arc "very complicated". Downey's personal trainer Eric Oram stated that the trick to pitting Rogers against Stark, "is to show Iron Man using the 'minimum force' necessary to win the fight". Marvel initially wanted Downey's part to be smaller, but "Downey wanted Stark to have a more substantial role in the film's plot." Variety noted that Downey would receive $40 million plus backend for his participation, as well as an additional payout if the film outperformed The Winter Soldier, as Marvel would attribute that success to Downey's presence.
- Scarlett Johansson as Natasha Romanoff / Black Widow:
  An Avenger allied with Stark; formerly a highly trained S.H.I.E.L.D. spy. Anthony Russo noted her torn allegiances in the film, saying "her head is with Tony's side of things, but her heart is with Cap in a lot of ways." Johansson added that Romanoff is "looking to strategize her position, putting herself in a place where she is able to let the powers that be fight it out" in order for her to "have a better perspective of what's really going on." Describing her character's situation after the events of Avengers: Age of Ultron, Johansson said, "I think that the Widow's past will always haunt her. She's trying to move forward, she's trying to pick up the pieces of her life." She also said that Romanoff is at a point in her life where she can make choices herself, without having others have a hand in the decision process. On the continuation of the relationship between Romanoff and Rogers from The Winter Soldier, Joe Russo said that they wanted to "test it" by having Romanoff point out to Rogers the mistakes the team have made and convince him "that it might not be as black and white as he sees it" and that the Avengers must "find a way to work within the system so that [they] aren't disbanded."
- Sebastian Stan as Bucky Barnes / Winter Soldier:
  A physically enhanced brainwashed assassin allied with Rogers; his best friend who reemerged after being thought to be killed in action during World War II. This portrayal is an amalgam of Barnes and the Winter Soldier, with Stan saying, "here's the guy when you merge the two. This is what came out. To me, he's never really going to be Bucky Barnes again. There's going to be recognizable things about him, but his path through the [experiences of] Winter Soldier is always going to be there, haunting him." Because of this, the character has more lines in the film than in The Winter Soldier.
- Anthony Mackie as Sam Wilson / Falcon:
  An Avenger allied with Rogers; a former pararescueman trained by the military in aerial combat using a specially designed wing pack. Wilson is aided by a robotic drone named Redwing. Discussing the relationship between Wilson and Rogers, Mackie said, "With Falcon and Cap, what's so great is there's a mutual respect. There's a soldier respect. What's great about ... [Captain America: Civil War] is you get to see their relationship grow," adding, "He respects and admires Cap because Cap earned his rank as opposed to sitting in an office and just delegating orders." Joe Russo stated that the inclusion of Barnes to Rogers's side forces Wilson to question the dynamic and relationship he has with Rogers going forward.
- Don Cheadle as James "Rhodey" Rhodes / War Machine:
  A close personal friend of Tony Stark's and an Avenger allied with Stark; an officer in the U.S. Air Force who operates the War Machine armor. Cheadle called Rhodes's appearance in the film a "bit more intense and pivotal" compared to his previous appearances.
- Jeremy Renner as Clint Barton / Hawkeye:
  A master archer allied with Rogers; a retired Avenger and S.H.I.E.L.D. agent. On Barton's reasons for joining Rogers's side, Renner said, "Cap was the first guy who called. Let's just get the job done so I can get home to the family," along with feeling an obligation to side with Wanda Maximoff, since her brother, Pietro Maximoff, sacrificed himself to save Barton in Avengers: Age of Ultron. On how he and Barton fit into the Marvel Cinematic Universe, Renner said, "I'm happy to be the ensemble. I'm not scratching or clawing to do a solo movie by any means ... I think [Barton's] a utility guy that can bounce around into other people's universes a little bit".
- Chadwick Boseman as T'Challa / Black Panther:
  The prince of the African nation of Wakanda allied with Stark who gains enhanced strength by ingesting the Heart-Shaped Herb. Producer Kevin Feige explained that the character was included "because we needed a third party. We needed fresh eyes who wasn't embedded with the Avengers and who has a very different point of view than either Tony or Steve." T'Challa is in the "beginning phases of taking on" the Black Panther mantle, and appears in more than a cameo, with a full arc and character journey with "his own conflict and his own people that he's looking out for." Boseman did not audition for the role, instead having a "discussion about what [Marvel] wanted to do and how I saw it and what I wanted to do." T'Challa is torn between needing to live up to traditions and the legacy of his father and Wakanda, and how things need to happen in the present. Boseman developed the Wakandan accent himself, and used it during the entire production "whether he was on camera or not", while the Wakandan language was based on the Xhosa language, which Boseman was taught by John Kani (who plays T'Challa's father T'Chaka). The Black Panther costume is a combination of a practical costume and visual effects, featuring a vibranium mesh weave similar to chainmail. Costume designer Judianna Makovsky called the Black Panther costume "difficult" since "you needed sort of a feline body, but it's hard and practical at the same time. You needed a feeling of some sort of ethnicity in there, but of a world [Wakanda] we weren't really creating yet, so you didn't want to go too far and say too much about that world." Additionally, Makovsky felt creating T'Challa's royal look was "a bit of a challenge", avoiding African robes after learning actual African royalty are generally "educated in the West [and] get dressed in Savile Row." Boseman signed a five-picture deal with Marvel.
- Paul Bettany as Vision:
  An android and Avenger allied with Stark; created using the artificial intelligence J.A.R.V.I.S., Ultron, and the Mind Stone. Because the Vision was only created in the previous film, Age of Ultron, Bettany said, "you see my character get born... He must be both omnipotent and yet totally naive at the same time. And experiencing the world in real time and his place in it. Is he going to be a force of good or a force of evil?" Bettany also said he was interested in exploring "what it means to be human and what love is" with the character, as "The only way one can guarantee one's loyalty is love." This is exhibited in the connection Vision begins to form with Wanda Maximoff, with Bettany commenting, "They both have these new burgeoning powers that they don't understand ... I think he's worried that they're both dangerous. So he feels this real connection with her." As the Vision has the ability to create a projected disguise, he chooses to dress similarly to Howard Stark's attache, Edwin Jarvis.
- Elizabeth Olsen as Wanda Maximoff:
  An Avenger allied with Rogers; she can engage in hypnosis and telekinesis. According to Olsen, the character is "coming into her own and starting to understand and have conflict with how she wants to use her abilities." As such, Maximoff's costume was "relatively casual" and "more clothes-based than superhero-based" according to Makovsky, since the Russos believed Maximoff was not a full-fledged Avenger yet. When asked about the relationship between her character and the Vision compared to the comics, Olsen said, "You learn a little bit more about what connects [Scarlet and Vision] in this film. And I think there's some really sweet moments between Paul and I, and it's more about how they relate to one another and their similarities just based on their superpowers."
- Paul Rudd as Scott Lang / Ant-Man:
  A former electrical engineer turned petty criminal allied with Rogers; he acquired a suit that allows him to shrink or grow in scale while also increasing in strength. Rudd's suit "is streamlined and more high-tech" than the one seen in the film Ant-Man (2015). Ant-Man director Peyton Reed had discussed the character and the way that the Ant-Man production had shot certain sequences with the Russo brothers, saying, "As we were doing [Ant-Man] and we were in post and they were getting ready to head out to Atlanta to do Civil War, we had a lot of conversations ... It's important because there's this continuity that has to happen in this universe." On the decision to have Lang grow in size to become Giant-Man in the airport battle, Feige said, "It was just a great idea to turn the tide of the battle in a huge, shocking, unexpected way. We have a lot of ideas for [Ant-Man and the Wasp], none of which are contingent upon revealing Giant-Man, so we thought this would be the fun, unbelievable unexpected way to do that." Anthony Russo added that the transformation was the continuation of Lang's character arc from Ant-Man, saying "He's just really impressed with Captain America, he just wants to deliver and he figures out a way to deliver where he might actually tear himself in half but he's willing to do it and it works."
- Emily VanCamp as Sharon Carter:
  A former agent of S.H.I.E.L.D. and Peggy Carter's niece who now works for the CIA and supports Rogers. VanCamp stated that her character sides with Rogers because they both have "similar moral compasses". On a potential relationship between Rogers and Carter as in the comics, Evans said, "he's certainly open to it. Sharon is obviously relevant, but ... we don't have to tie it up in one movie. So they have time." VanCamp added, "We get to explore... I can't say we are going to that extent of it, but they are certainly getting to know each other."
- Marisa Tomei as May Parker: Peter Parker's aunt.
- Tom Holland as Peter Parker / Spider-Man:
  A teenager allied with Stark; he received spider-like abilities after being bitten by a radioactive spider. Feige said that Parker would be torn between superhero ideologies, saying, "Does he want to be like these other characters? Does he want nothing to do with these other characters? How does that impact his experience, being this grounded but super powerful hero? Those are all the things that Stan Lee and Steve Ditko played with in the first 10 years of his comics, and that now we can play with for the first time in a movie." On aligning with Stark, Anthony Russo said that, despite entering the conflict after the two factions have formed and not having much political investment, Parker's choice comes from "a very personal relationship" he develops with Stark. The Russos hoped "to take a very logical and realistic and naturalistic approach to the character" compared to the previous film portrayals. Anthony Russo added that the character's introduction had to fit "that specific tonal stylistic world" of the MCU, as well as the tone established by the directors in The Winter Soldier, saying, "It's a little more grounded and a little more hard-core contemporary." That was "coloring our choices a lot" with Parker. On the Spider-Man suit, Joe Russo described it as "a slightly more traditional, Steve Ditko influenced suit," and that the film would explore the way the suit operates, particularly the mechanical eyes. Holland chose not to read the whole Civil War script in order to avoid potentially leaking plot information publicly. He was initially signed on for at least three films, not including his Civil War appearance. Holland later expanded, saying he was signed for "three Spider-Man movies and three solo movies".
- Frank Grillo as Brock Rumlow:
  Former commander of S.H.I.E.L.D.'s counter-terrorism S.T.R.I.K.E. team who was revealed to be an agent of Hydra. On returning to the character, Grillo said "He's a badass. He is just vicious. I like the idea that it's no holds barred. I was 15 pounds (6.8 kg) bigger when I did Cap 2, and I'll put another 15 pounds (6.8 kg) on to do Cap 3." However, he cautioned that "This movie is such a big movie with a lot of people in it, so you don't get as much of the time that you'd like to have." Grillo stated that Rumlow's main objective in the film is to seek revenge—"Whatever Rumlow was feeling as far as being torn between which side he should be on, which I think he was, is gone now."
- Martin Freeman as Everett K. Ross:
  A member of the CIA's Joint Counter Terrorism Center and a character associated with Black Panther in the comics. Freeman described Ross as someone who "works for the American government ... [and] works in conjunction with the superheroes, and certain agencies that help to tame the superheroes' power". Feige added that Ross would appear briefly in the film, with the intent being to expand on the character's role in future films; Freeman signed a three-film contract, for Civil War, Black Panther (2018), and the latter's sequel (2022).
- William Hurt as Thaddeus Ross:
  The United States Secretary of State and a former U.S. Army general. Hurt, on returning to the MCU after appearing in The Incredible Hulk, said, "I don't think it's a reprise, I think it's a new iteration completely," adding, "what [the writers have] done is they've taken a character ... and made a new version... a more modernized style." Joe Russo added that Ross was the perfect character to use because he has "a fanatical anti-superhero point of view" and has "become much savvier and more political and has put himself in a position of power, not unlike a Colin Powell. He's cornering the Avengers politically now, he's out-maneuvering them." Joe also added that Ross was included because the Russos felt it was important to make The Incredible Hulk "relevant again within the [MCU]" since it "may have been forgotten about a little bit".
- Daniel Brühl as Helmut Zemo:
  A Sokovian colonel-turned-terrorist who is obsessed with defeating the Avengers. Zemo, who goes by multiple names in the film, does not wear his signature mask from the comics. Brühl said the version appearing in the film is "loosely connected" to the character from the comics and that was a reason he liked Marvel, as "some of the characters and things they're dealing with always reference to current events so my character is from a different area than you would think." Feige described the character as "very much a product of the [Marvel] Cinematic Universe and all that has occurred within that universe up to this point", while Anthony Russo called him "an everyman. His approach was: I've seen these guys fight enough to know I can't win. But what I can do is figure out ways to undermine them. He's emotionally driven and he finds a weak spot." Brühl, who was cast due to his German accent, did not feel the role was a stereotype, saying, "It's not a guy who's mean and sinister, but he's actually very clever—a very smart guy who does everything out of a very understandable reason and motivation." Brühl also stated that Zemo may re-appear in future MCU films, with Moore adding that, while Zemo has a purpose in this film, it is more to set up a future film.

Additionally, John Slattery and Kerry Condon reprise their roles as Howard Stark and the voice of F.R.I.D.A.Y. from previous MCU films. John Kani appears as T'Chaka, father of T'Challa and ruler of Wakanda; Hope Davis appears as Maria Stark, Tony Stark's mother; Gene Farber appears as Vasily Karpov, the Hydra official who oversaw the Winter Soldier program; and Florence Kasumba portrays Ayo, a member of T'Challa's Dora Milaje. Alfre Woodard, who portrays Mariah Dillard in the MCU television series Luke Cage (2016–2018), briefly appears in the film as Miriam Sharpe, the mother of an American citizen killed in the battle of Sokovia. Woodard was suggested for the role by Downey before Marvel Studios learned of her casting in Luke Cage. Jim Rash appears as a faculty member at MIT, while Stan Lee makes a cameo appearance as a FedEx deliveryman, and co-director Joe Russo cameos as Theo Broussard, a psychiatrist murdered by Zemo. Damion Poitier, who appeared as Thanos in the film The Avengers (2012) before Josh Brolin was cast in that role for subsequent films, appears as one of Rumlow's mercenaries.

== Production ==
=== Development ===
This is the Civil War of the Cinematic Universe, which will be greatly inspired by the "Civil War" of the comic universe, but we have a very different continuity going on ... It's not about the secret identity thing, as much as it is about, overall, who reports to who, and who can agree to [an] oversight committee. Because as of now, in [Age of Ultron], there is no more security council, there is no S.H.I.E.L.D., obviously. Stark is paying for [the Avengers], Captain America is running it, and things occur that will make governments begin to question.

— Kevin Feige, President of Marvel Studios

In March 2014, Anthony and Joe Russo confirmed that they had signed on to return as directors for a third Captain America film, along with Chris Evans as Captain America, Kevin Feige as producer, and Christopher Markus and Stephen McFeely as screenwriters. Markus and McFeely had been working on the screenplay since late 2013, while the Russo brothers began work in February 2014. The re-hiring of the directors, three months before the release of Captain America: The Winter Soldier, came as a result of Marvel executives being impressed with test screenings of that film. Evans earned $15 million for the film.

In an April 2014 interview, Joe Russo described the project as a continuation of the story from Captain America: The Winter Soldier: "What's nice about the film is that ... it's a two-parter. There's a journey that the Winter Soldier goes on that isn't complete yet." That month, Marvel announced a release date of May 6, 2016, and Trent Opaloch, who was the cinematographer on The Winter Soldier, said he would return for the sequel. In July, Markus and McFeely stated that they were midway through a first draft for the film, on which principal photography was expected to begin in April 2015. The following month, they stated that they were looking to make the tone of the film "an amalgam" of The First Avenger and The Winter Soldier, with the Russos likening it to a psychological thriller, citing the films The Godfather (1972), Seven (1995), and Fargo (1996) as influences, along with westerns and Brian De Palma's films. The Russos also stated that "a good portion of [Civil War is] actually funnier than Winter Soldier" with a more comedic tone and lighter moments throughout.

In August 2014, the Russos stated that the film would be set "a couple years" after The Winter Soldier, and would continue to focus on Steve Rogers's relationship with Bucky Barnes as well as the political themes related to Captain America. Anthony stated, "The character was invented for an explicitly political purpose. So it's hard to get away from that nature." The Russos also said that they would be "bringing some new elements to the table that will give us a twist on Winter Soldier", and indicated that filming was scheduled to begin in Atlanta. They described themselves as "ecstatic" with a first draft of the screenplay submitted by Markus and McFeely, and also stated that the film's title would be announced "in a month or so at most", and that the concept and title for the film came from Feige, who had it "for a while". In September, Joe expanded by saying the film would have another "big idea that alters the universe as a whole in some way" similar to S.H.I.E.L.D. falling in The Winter Soldier. The rest of the film, such as the characters, story, and tone, would be left open to the Russos' and writers' interpretations.

=== Pre-production ===
By October 2014, Robert Downey Jr. had entered final negotiations to reprise his role as Tony Stark / Iron Man in the film. Downey was added in order for the film to adapt the 2006–07 "Civil War" comic book storyline written by Mark Millar, which pitted Iron Man against Captain America. At the end of the month, it was confirmed that Sebastian Stan would return as Bucky Barnes / Winter Soldier. A few days later, Marvel revealed that the film would be titled Captain America: Civil War, confirming Downey's appearance and announcing that Chadwick Boseman would appear in the film as Black Panther ahead of his own solo film. Feige also confirmed that the film would be the first in the MCU's Phase Three slate of films. Anthony Russo stated that adapting the "Civil War" storyline was not always the intended storyline and direction for the film when the brothers initially signed on to return as directors. Markus expanded on this, saying the original concept for a third Captain America film "never got to draft", with Feige at some point telling the writing team to begin adapting "Civil War" around their original ideas. McFeely also added that, despite the shift in direction for the film, "The central theme, even the way Zemo is operating, are from that [early] iteration." The Russos revealed that, had negotiations with Downey to appear in the film failed, they would have used the Madbomb storyline from the Captain America comics, which was eventually used as a plot point in the first season of the Agent Carter TV series. The premise for the film would have centered on Zemo detonating the Madbomb, which would "turn hordes of people into berserkers" to present a physical threat to Captain America, while still pitting heroes against each other, as some would be zombified due to the Madbomb, to satisfy an "emotional component" for the film.

McFeely said that the idea of basing a film on "Civil War" had "been on and off the table for a while" at Marvel Studios, explaining, "it's a challenge to do it and make sure that all the characters that we've established, and everyone's established in the MCU are serviced and sound correct. Because there's a difference between the characters in "Civil War", which was written in 2006, 2007. The MCU doesn't exist [when it was written]. There isn't a Robert Downey Jr. or Chris Evans who has helped create the character[s] so we need to make sure that that template gets adjusted". Joe Russo added that the "essence" of "Civil War" was used, such as "the concept of registration, the notion that heroes need to be either monitored or controlled because their power can be scary" being applicable. Anthony Russo expanded, "in a lot of ways [superhero registration] can be a political issue, and we didn't want the conflict of the movie to solely exist on that level. We wanted to figure out very personal reasons why everyone's relationship to this idea of registration is going to become complicated. That's what the relationship between Steve and Bucky allowed us to do, to get very personal in terms of why people would lean one way or the other." Executive producer Nate Moore added that "it felt like it was kind of the right time" to adapt "Civil War" given The Avengers, plus many of the Phase Two films (Thor: The Dark World, The Winter Soldier, and Avengers: Age of Ultron), all dealt with "world-ending experiences. We felt like we had to tell the next step in that story, which is ... what is the world's reaction?"

Executives at Marvel Entertainment balked at the idea of Captain America and Iron Man coming to blows at the end of the film and wanted the Avengers to unite to fight Zemo and the supersoldiers at the Hydra base in Siberia instead. The Russos were not happy with this idea, with Joe Russo saying, "There's nothing interesting about that film. We're not here to make that movie. We're not interested in telling another superhero story." Feige supported the Russos, who were going to leave the film if the changes were forced on them. This prompted Walt Disney Studios head Alan F. Horn to back the Russos in making the film as originally intended, and led to oversight of Marvel Studios being moved from Marvel Entertainment to Walt Disney Studios in 2015.

In November 2014, Daniel Brühl joined the cast in an unspecified role, while Anthony Mackie and Frank Grillo were confirmed to return as Sam Wilson / Falcon and Brock Rumlow / Crossbones, respectively. Following the November 2014 hacking of Sony Pictures's computers, emails between Sony Pictures Entertainment co-chairman Amy Pascal and president Doug Belgrad were released stating that Marvel wanted to include Spider-Man (whose film rights are licensed to Sony) in the film, but talks between the studios concerning this were believed to have broken down. However, in February 2015, Sony Pictures and Marvel Studios reached a licensing deal for the use of Spider-Man in an MCU film, and reports indicated that the character would indeed appear in Civil War. The Russos stated they were lobbying for months to include the character in the film. In January 2015, Mackie revealed that, in addition to Atlanta, filming locations would include Puerto Rico and Berlin, while the Russo brothers confirmed that Scarlett Johansson would return in the film as Natasha Romanoff / Black Widow. Editor Jeffrey Ford, who worked on The Winter Soldier, also signed on for Civil War. In March 2015, Jeremy Renner was revealed to be reprising his role as Clint Barton / Hawkeye. The next month, it was revealed that the film would be converted to 3D in post-production, and that Brühl would be playing Helmut Zemo. Additionally, Elizabeth Olsen revealed she would reprise her role in the film as Wanda Maximoff / Scarlet Witch.

=== Filming ===
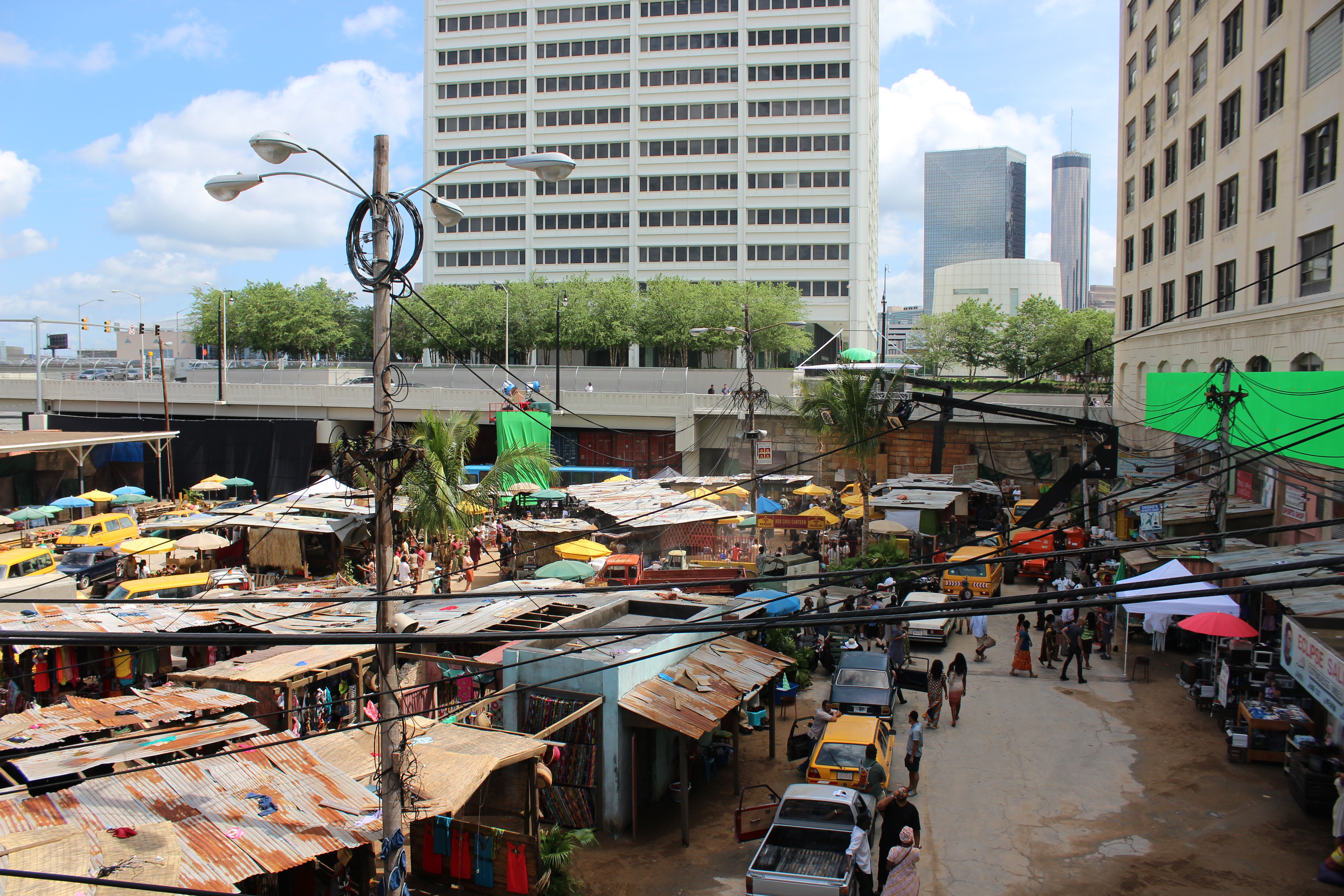
Film set for Captain America: Civil War in Downtown Atlanta

Principal photography began on April 27, 2015, in Fayette County, Georgia, at Pinewood Atlanta Studios, under the working title Sputnik. Other filming locations in the Atlanta metropolitan area included the Buckhead district of Atlanta; the Peachtree Christian Church in Midtown Atlanta; Downtown Atlanta, including an area near Philips Arena known as The Gulch, which served as the market in Lagos; Norcross, Georgia; Porsche's headquarters in Atlanta at Aerotropolis Atlanta, which served as the Avengers' headquarters in the film; and the Atlanta Civic Center, which served as the IFID (Institute for Infectious Diseases) laboratory in Lagos; the latter's interiors doubled as MIT, and a third part was used for a Berlin location. Trent Opaloch served as director of photography, while Chad Stahelski, David Leitch, and The Winter Soldier stuntman Spiro Razatos were second unit directors.

In early May, Marvel announced that Martin Freeman was cast in an unspecified role, while also reprising roles in the film would be Paul Bettany as Vision, Don Cheadle as James Rhodes / War Machine, Paul Rudd as Scott Lang / Ant-Man, Emily VanCamp as Sharon Carter, and William Hurt as Thaddeus Ross. Samuel L. Jackson, who appeared as Nick Fury in the two previous Captain America films, said he was "surprised" to discover that he would not be in Captain America: Civil War, after "the Russo Brothers told [him he] was." Moore stated that Fury was not included "because he didn't add anything to the Civil War story they were telling", while Markus stated that they did not want him to choose any particular side because "that's not his place in the universe". On each of the character's ties to the plot, Anthony Russo said that each character was examined on a personal level to see how they would respond to the idea of registration. On the portrayal of each character, Joe Russo said that he and his brother had strong "emotional" and "psychological connection[s] to [these] characters" as children, adding, "We want to reach into that and understand what elementally motivated you to love the character. That's what we try to bring out in the characters now." He also mentioned that they were "trying to honor the feeling of naturalism and to honor the feeling of reality [with the film]."

After the reveal of the film's full cast, many outlets and fans began referring to the film as "Avengers 2.5 ", given the variety and ensemble nature of the cast, usually reserved for the Avengers films, and the fact that the film no longer felt like a Captain America-centric one, as with The Winter Soldier. In response to this, Feige said, "What's fun about Civil War though is, as you know from the comics, it's a very simple story. And it really has to be, to accommodate that many players. It's very much a Captain America movie and it's very much a sequel to the Winter Soldier in ways I don't think people [will expect].... It's a very simple structure that allows you to have these amazing character interactions in a way that I don't think becomes overwhelming." Feige also revealed that Hope van Dyne / Wasp was in an original draft of the film, after receiving the Wasp costume at the end of Ant-Man, but was cut because "there are so many characters in Civil War that we didn't want to do her a disservice," saying Marvel was "saving" the character for a better environment to reveal van Dyne in the Wasp costume for the first time and see "her dynamic with Scott [Lang] in a way it could play out".

At the end of May, the Russo brothers, along with Feige and Pascal, held a screen test in Atlanta for six teenage actors that were being eyed for the role of Peter Parker / Spider-Man, with the actors testing against Downey and Evans for "chemistry"; Tom Holland was cast as the character the next month, to also appear in a solo film. The Russos "were pretty vocal about who we wanted for the part", pushing to cast an actor close to the age of Peter Parker in the comics, in order to differentiate from the previous portrayals, with Anthony Russo believing Holland's age was one of the factors Sony was initially hesitant on Holland for the role. They also praised Holland for having a dancing and gymnastics background. Downey felt of all the actors he tested with, Holland brought "gravitas and the confidence to be able to take on the mantle" of portraying Spider-Man. At the time, Marvel did not confirm his involvement in Civil War, due to being contractually obligated not to talk about his inclusion publicly. The Russos discussed this, saying that the various business deals and agreements stemming from the sharing of the character rights, such as on a promotional and commercial level, "were always lagging slightly behind how we were using the character. We were always in danger of upsetting the deal—there were still sensitive issues going on between the two studios that they needed to agree on."

Holland was confirmed to appear in the film in July 2015, by Jonathan M. Goldstein, one of the writers of the solo Spider-Man film, and later by Entertainment Weekly from a set visit. Jon Watts, director of Spider-Man: Homecoming, was on set for the filming of Spider-Man's scenes, in order to "see what they were doing with it, and that informed where we eventually took it," and provide "ideas about this and that", such as what Parker's wardrobe and bedroom should look like, "to make sure we were all on the same page so that [Homecoming] transitions seamlessly with theirs." Anthony Russo stated that, despite Marvel telling them to have a "plan B" should the deal with Sony fail, the Russos never created one because "it was very important to us to reintroduce" Spider-Man in the film, adding, "We only have envisioned the movie with Spider-Man."

By the end of June, filming reached the halfway mark, with production moving to Germany in early August. Filming locations in Germany included the Olympic Stadium, Potsdamer Platz, Internationales Congress Centrum Berlin and Messe Berlin in Berlin, and the Leipzig/Halle Airport in Schkeuditz. Studio work was done at Babelsberg Studio. Additional filming also took place in Puerto Rico and Norway, and was scheduled to in Iceland. Principal photography wrapped on August 22, 2015.

Captain America: Civil War was the first film to use IMAX's digital 2D cameras, made in partnership with Arri, which was a customized version of the Arri Alexa 65. According to Joe Russo, approximately fifteen minutes of the film, the sequence where the two factions fight at Leipzig/Halle Airport, which was described as having "incredible scale to it" and referred to by the directors as the "splash panel", were shot with the cameras. Opaloch noted that there were discussions late in pre-production to shoot the entire film with the Alexa 65 cameras. However, because of how close it was to the start of shooting as well as the idea being "such a large-scale undertaking", it was decided to only use them for the airport sequence, with the rest of film being shot on Arri Alexa XT digital cameras. For the airport sequence, Opaloch rigged the Alexa 65s to a Technocrane, a Steadicam, a dolly as well as a drone for flyover shots, which had its own dedicated team operating it. Because of the amount of resolution the Alexa 65s offered, Opaloch chose to use medium close-ups instead of close-ups, and for his wide shots, hold the shot a bit longer, "maybe with a slight camera move that allows the viewer to take it all in."

=== Post-production ===
In September 2015, Mark Ruffalo, who plays Bruce Banner / Hulk in the MCU films, stated that his character was originally in the Civil War script, but was removed due to the end of Age of Ultron, as Marvel did not "want to reveal where [he is] and why" in this film. Markus added that as soon as the Hulk joined a side, the fight would be quickly over, saying, "You've got to kind of choose your roster [of characters] depending on what kind of fight you want to have." He later explained that he contemplated having the Hulk appear at the very end of the film, but decided against it, feeling that he was over-stuffing the film with characters, adding, "[The Hulk] has clearly gone somewhere at the end of [Age of] Ultron, and that's a story. Don't blow it off and put it in a little tiny chunk just to put in a little extra filigree on our movie." Additionally, Ross's alter ego, Red Hulk, was also considered for inclusion, but the Russos felt that part of the character would need a proper backstory which they could not afford to give in the already crowded film. They felt that Ross "was there sort of as the government's agenda and not to add another complicated super powered character to the mix." Spider-Man's Iron Spider suit was also considered.

That November, Joe Russo stated that the theme of the film was betrayal, calling it "extremely emotional. [The film] hinges on that emotion, and on a very personal level we didn't want [it] to become about politics and people arguing about platitudes. The third act is built around a very personal moment between [Captain America and Iron Man]." The Russos spent a great deal of time with Markus, McFeely, and Moore to ensure each character's emotional arc tracked through the entire film correctly, though realized that at some point "you have to sacrifice logic for expediency". Speaking about the post-production process in January 2016, the Russo brothers said, "This has been the easiest post process we've ever had on a film. We're very happy with how the movie was. Everyone is very happy with where the movie was. For us, the tricky thing is the effects because it's a very complicated movie and there are some really big sequences in the film. The effects are on a much larger scale than the work we did on Winter Soldier. That's the part that becomes really difficult because you don't have a lot of time and everyone has very high standards. So everyone starts killing themselves at this point...we'll be done with the movie in two and a half months." They also stated that the film would be doing "a few reshoots" in mid-to-late January.

In February, Freeman's character was revealed to be Everett K. Ross, and Gwyneth Paltrow was reported to have joined the film for the January reshoots, reprising her role as Pepper Potts; however, in April 2016, it was revealed that Paltrow does not appear in the film, with Anthony Russo explaining that Paltrow's contract with Marvel had ended after Iron Man 3, and "we decided early on that we could make Pepper's break-up [with Tony Stark] have an emotional impact without actually having a scene with her." On March 16, 2016, the Russos stated the film was "about a week and a half away from" completion, with Joe adding that the film would have a post-credits scene, with the possibility for two or three total. The film was completed on April 4, 2016. Later in April, Alfre Woodard and Jim Rash were revealed to be cast in the film, while Feige explained that Black Panther director Ryan Coogler contributed some dialogue for Black Panther in several scenes during reshoots. At the film's premiere, it was revealed that Marisa Tomei appears in the film as May Parker, Peter Parker's aunt.

==== Visual effects ====
Original (top) and postvisualization (bottom) shots of the fight scene at Leipzig/Halle Airport

Nearly 20 visual effects studios worked on Captain America: Civil War including Industrial Light & Magic (ILM), Lola VFX, Method Studios, Luma Pictures, DNEG, Image Engine, Trixter, Cinesite, and The Third Floor amongst others. Lola VFX de-aged Downey Jr. in a scene that involved a younger holographic version of himself. Lola VFX's visual effects supervisor, Trent Claus said, "In this case, we analyzed footage of Mr. Downey at the approximate age that we wanted to target, which was around the time of the film Less than Zero [when Downey was in his early 20s]." He also noted the difficulty of the scene, due to it being close to 4,000 frames, and the fact that Downey was moving his head from side to side multiple times. Lola also worked on visual effects for the Vision. The Third Floor extensively previsualized the film including the fight scene at Leipzig/Halle Airport. Gerardo Ramirez, the Previs and Postvis Supervisor for The Third Floor said:

We visualized most of the major scenes in the film, some that were more story driven and some that were more action and story driven. The Russos used various methods for planning and they used each department for what it does best. The early edits were a combination of storyboards, previs and stunt performance clips. Stunts would choreograph the hand-to-hand action while the storyboards would be used for character story moments and previs was used for the big action scenes that involved many digital characters.

Method Studios, which worked on 440 shots, was responsible for the helicopter sequence in the middle of the film and the climactic fight between Iron Man, Bucky, and Captain America. The original intent for the helicopter sequence was to place the scene next to the Paul-Löbe-Haus, where the Bundestag meets; however, the location was not allowed to be shown in the film, resulting in Method needing to create a full CGI background. For the climactic fight, one of the challenges for Method was getting the color of Iron Man's suit correct, opting to go with a more "classic Iron Man look versus the really glossy car paint look" that Iron Man had in the previous Avengers films. ILM was primarily responsible for the visual effects during the large-scale fight sequence at the airport, along with creating the digital assets for all of the characters. VFX supervisor Russell Earl, stated that the 20-minute scene grew to be an almost fully digital sequence explaining, "We ultimately ended up replacing 99% of everything that was shot with the actors being lifted from the background. Originally both Spider-Man and Black Panther were planned to be photographed elements but we ended up almost completely replacing them." Luma Pictures, who also worked on The Winter Soldier, was assigned with completing shots of Bucky's arm and his metal brainwashing chair. They also worked on Bucky's escape from the task force lobby and designed Iron Man's new hybrid nanotechnology armor, which was an homage to the character's Bleeding Edge armor from the comics. Their work totaled approximately 200 shots. Spider-Man was a digital double for all of his appearances, featuring his finalized suit; on-set, Holland wore a temporary Spider-Man suit that featured raised webbing and a different spider emblem, or a motion capture suit.

Design firm Sarofsky once again worked on the film's main-on-end title sequence, having done the same for The Winter Soldier. The sequence used "muted and mottled, burnt umber and steel blue and cold grey" colors, which were stark contrasts to the sequences for The Winter Soldier and The First Avenger (the latter created by Method Design) which were "a minimalist graphic approach, reducing the key players to silhouettes and paring the palette down to three colors" and "vibrant and iconic propaganda art comes to life, enticing the viewer to join the fray", respectively. Creative director Erin Sarofsky noted one of the challenges for Civil War's sequence was "to make it feel like a Captain America title sequence and not an Avengers sequence" given the number of characters in the film.

== Music ==
Henry Jackman returned from The Winter Soldier to score the sequel. He found the movie to be tonally different from the previous one, which necessitated a much more symphonic and orchestral score. This culminates in the final fight between Captain America, Winter Soldier, and Iron Man, the music for which Jackman described as "somewhat operatic and ... almost classical in its style". Though Jackman reprised and developed his themes for Captain America and the Winter Soldier from the previous film, and introduced motifs for the new characters Spider-Man, Black Panther, and Zemo, he was wary of pushing the audience to one side of the central conflict or the other by using character-specific music; Jackman composed a new main theme for the film to represent the Civil War, "a generic theme to balance everything out", "toward which all the characters can gravitate. It wrapped them all up and it helped to bind the movie together rather than do endless disparate themes." Jackman also wrote a thriller theme that appears whenever the mystery surrounding Zemo's plan is explored. This was inspired by the works of Jerry Goldsmith. The score was released on a soundtrack album by Hollywood Records on May 6, 2016.

== Marketing ==
=== Promotion ===
In early July 2015, Marvel began a viral marketing campaign for Ant-Man featuring Leslie Bibb, reprising her role from the Iron Man films as journalist Christine Everhart, reporting for the faux news program, WHIH Newsfront. In one program, Everhart discusses events leading to Captain America: Civil War. The post-credits scene for Ant-Man featured footage shot by the Russo brothers for Captain America: Civil War, showing Wilson and Rogers with Barnes in their custody, and unable to contact Stark because of "the accords"; Wilson mentions that he "know[s] a guy", implying Lang. Feige explained that when the post-credit sequence appears in Civil War it may appear with "different takes...different angles." Stan said the scene was shot in early May 2015, and would appear in the middle of Civil War. The first footage of the film debuted in August 2015 at the D23 Expo. Additional footage was shown in September 2015 at the Asia Pop Comic Convention. The footage shown at the D23 Expo and 2015 Asia Pop Comic Convention received an overwhelmingly positive response from the audiences.

The first trailer for the film debuted on Jimmy Kimmel Live! on November 25, 2015, and within hours became the number one trending topic on Twitter. The trailer was viewed 61 million times in the first 24 hours of release, surpassing the 34 million views of Avengers: Age of Ultron's in 2014. Scott Mendelson of Forbes called the trailer a "doozy" and noted that the early debut ahead of the release of Star Wars: The Force Awakens was a "good show" on behalf of Disney as it was "a way to not get lost amid the 8,000 other trailers debuting with Star Wars". Mendelson also noted that based on the trailer's content, the film was being "sold as Captain America 3, as opposed to Avengers 2.5 or Iron Man 4," which could help keep the film's box office expectations in check.

On February 4, 2016, Marvel released their own version of the Facebook "#FriendsDay" video for Captain America. The video mirrors those created by Facebook for users to celebrate the anniversary of Facebook's founding, and features images of Captain America's "friends" the Winter Soldier, Thor, Falcon and Hawkeye. The video concludes with an image of Captain America and Iron Man being torn in half. Jennifer Konerman of The Hollywood Reporter called the video "timely" and its contents "especially relevant considering the storyline" of Civil War. Three days later, a teaser debuted during Super Bowl 50, which received the most social media activity out of all the film trailers released that day. Anthony Breznican of Entertainment Weekly said the footage "actually feels a little more like a teaser [than a full trailer], since it shows some new shots, but really doesn't reveal much more about the story." Additionally, he felt the chanting "unseen voices calling out, 'United...We...Stand' and 'Divided...We...Fall'" had "a football stadium vibe", complimenting it appearing during the Super Bowl. Mendelson added that Marvel did not need to follow the model used for The Winter Soldier during Super Bowl XLVIII of showing a longer trailer after the teaser since Civil War was "frankly [a] higher-profile sequel." Overall, Mendelson felt the spot was "only a little less low-key and small(er)-scale as the trailer that debuted in" November 2015, and sold the "real world" aspect "with character drama and mostly real-world action between would-be superheroes."

Four days later, on Valentine's Day, the Facebook campaign was continued, with Marvel creating a "faux-status update" for Captain America, showing his relationship status had changed to "In a Complicated Relationship with Iron Man". At The Walt Disney Company's annual shareholder meeting in the Auditorium Theatre in March, CEO Bob Iger presented a clip from the film to "generous applause". From March 7 to 10, Marvel released individual posters for characters in the film, continued its Facebook campaign with two teaser videos showcasing the participants on "Team Cap" and "Team Iron Man", and released a second trailer. The trailer was viewed close to 95 million times within the first 24 hours of release, surpassing the views achieved by the first trailer. In addition, 240,000 social media posts across Twitter, Tumblr, Instagram, and Facebook, among others, were made related to the trailer, surpassing the 81,000 the Age of Ultron trailer received in 2014. According to internet analytics firm ZEFR, the trailer was viewed over 62 million times from YouTube and Facebook over four days, making it the second most viewed trailer at the time, behind the 64.6 million views for the first Star Wars: The Force Awakens trailer. It also became the top trailer in 2016 through March 13, 2016, according to research firm ListenFirst, for receiving the most likes, retweets and other engagement on Twitter. The trailer continued to be the top viewed trailer on YouTube and Facebook for three straight weeks according to ZEFR, receiving more than 96 million total views since its release.

Mendelson called the trailer "a textbook case for unnecessary second pitches...Is there anyone out there who watched that first teaser back in December and said 'Hmm, it looks good and all, but I need more evidence'?" He added that he was "a little disappointed by the big Spider-Man reveal," having previously wondered, after a Spider-Man character poster was not released with the others, if Marvel would have the "courage" to not include the character in any marketing materials before the film's release, letting the "Peter Parker scenes the film has to offer be something that is a surprise for theatrical moviegoers and/or something that drives post-opening weekend buzz". Mendelson's colleague at Forbes Mark Hughes felt differently, noting that the trailer was targeting the general audience rather than just fans by giving "us more explanation [and context] of why a clearly major battle is raging between Captain America and Iron Man", and by including Spider-Man since "there are plenty of surprises in these movies, and since we all already know Spider-Man is in Civil War, refusing to let us see him would frankly be a bit weird and pointless ... it's common for average filmgoers to hear some final bit of information or see some final image and feel compelled, inspired, or otherwise driven to go out to the movies that day. There are any number of factors that can come into play...and the world needed to see [Spider-Man] because it's the sort of value-added element that can make [a] difference". Graeme McMillan of The Hollywood Reporter felt that the Spider-Man reveal "alone makes the trailer", describing it as feeling "like the comic book character come to life. That awkward, voice-cracking, 'hey everyone' was as humble, playing-it-cool and cocky as he should be."

With the film seemingly continuing plot threads first introduced in Age of Ultron, Mendelson wondered "to what extent the whole 'Consequences galore!' narrative of Civil War will improve Age of Ultron. As much great stuff as that movie has ... [it ultimately shows] the main hero foolishly/recklessly [bring] a world-killing threat to Earth and lots of really bad stuff goes down and yet no one seems to care at the end ... What does it mean if Civil War does retroactively improve Age of Ultron? Will we be at a point where we really can't judge a franchise installment on its own merits because a future installment may well fix the flaws a couple years down the line?" McMillan continued some of Mendelson's thinking, feeling that Marvel was "in an awkward place with Civil War" regarding superhero destruction moving forward. He wondered how superhero oversight would "actually prevent the kind of destruction that it's meant to stop ... unless the bad guys all agree to play by the new rules" as well. "Worse still ... the destruction caused by superhero fights [should now be] foremost in viewers' heads ... the audience won't be able to enjoy the sight of the Hulk smashing a random minion through a wall without thinking of the property damage and/or whoever was standing on the other side of that wall. After Civil War, can Marvel go back to pretending that everyone is okay after any large scale event ever again?"

Also in March, Marvel, in partnership with the National Academy of Sciences Science & Entertainment Exchange, Dolby Laboratories, Broadcom, and Synchrony Bank, announced the "Girls Reforming the Future Challenge", aimed at females aged 15 through 18 in STEM (Science, Technology, Engineering, and Mathematics education) fields, to submit projects they feel can change the world and have far-reaching effects. Five winners would attend the world premiere at the Dolby Theatre, and receive a tour of Walt Disney Studios and a $500 saving account from Synchrony Bank, with one grand prize winner receiving an internship at Marvel Studios. On April 10, Evans debuted an exclusive clip of the film during the 2016 MTV Movie Awards. Throughout the month, the Russo brothers and the cast promoted the film in Paris, Beijing, Singapore, Berlin and London. At the end of the month, Marvel released additional viral marketing videos of WHIH Newsfront, featuring Bibb once again reprising her role as Everhart. In the program, Everhart discusses with "political analyst" Will Adams, portrayed by Al Madrigal, the cost the Avengers bring for saving the world, and if they should have regulation from the government. Additional Newsfront segments saw William Sadler reprise his role as President Matthew Ellis, including an "exclusive" interview and his reaction to the incident involving the Avengers in Lagos. On May 2, 2016, Evans, Renner, and executives from Marvel rang the opening bell of the New York Stock Exchange in honor of the film's theatrical release.

=== Merchandise ===
At the 2015 Licensing International Expo, Disney Consumer Products announced that they would partner with licensees including Hasbro, Lego, Funko, Hot Wheels, Rubies, Mad Engine, C-Life, Jay Franco, Global Brand Group, Kellogg's, Hallmark and American Greetings to sell merchandise related to the film; Coca-Cola, Google, Samsung, Wrigley, Harley Davidson, Audi, Synchrony Financial, Pringles, Keebler, Pizza Hut, Pop Secret, Mouser Electronics, and Vivo, among other brands, were also licensees for the film. Paul Gitter, senior VP of licensing for Marvel at Disney Consumer Products said that they will build off the success of licensed products for Avengers: Age of Ultron, including a focus on a celebration of Captain America's 75th anniversary, female apparel, healthy living and travel, and on marketing newer characters such as War Machine, Falcon, Vision, Black Widow and Black Panther. "The Avengers team is both aspirational and hugely merchandisable, made up of multiple, unique heroes coming together with amazing skills, cool vehicles and a high tech headquarters," said Gitter. "Captain America: Civil War not only gives us new storytelling for our favorite superheroes, but also introduces new ones allowing us to expand product lines for kids and fans." As part of the $200 million marketing effort for the film, Harley Davidson created two customized motorcycles for the film, Audi debuted a commercial directed by the Russos featuring unreleased scenes from the film, while Pizza Hut debuted collectible boxes and Kellogg's, Pringles, and Keebler products featured virtual reality experiences. The lead-up to the film's release culminated in a massive online vote across Google, YouTube, and Twitter for either Team Captain America or Team Iron Man.

Marvel Comics released a four-issue comic prelude by writer Will Corona Pilgrim and artist Szymon Kudranski, beginning in December 2015, that adapted the events of Iron Man 3 and Captain America: The Winter Soldier. On February 10, Marvel Comics released another comic prelude, a single-issue infinite comic set between The Winter Soldier and Civil War. Written again by Pilgrim, the comic is told from the perspectives of Barnes, Rumlow, and Rogers, showing how each ended up where they begin Civil War. Art for each character's perspective is provided by Lee Ferguson, Goran Sudžuka, and Guillermo Mogorron, respectively.

== Release ==
=== Theatrical ===
Captain America: Civil War premiered at the Dolby Theatre in Hollywood, Los Angeles, on April 12, 2016, and was screened at CinemaCon 2016 on April 13. The film's Southeast Asia premiere was held on April 21 at the Marina Bay Sands resort in Singapore, while the European premiere took place at Vue Cinemas in Westfield London on April 26. The film was released internationally starting from April 27, releasing in 61 countries its first weekend, including the United Kingdom on April 29. The North America release on May 6, took place in over 4,200 theaters, of which 3,300 were in 3D, along with 378 IMAX theaters, 480 premium large-format, and 161 D-Box locations. Internationally, the film opened in 955 IMAX theaters, while South Korea saw Civil War open in an "unprecedented" 1,989 theaters. Captain America: Civil War was the first film released in Phase Three of the MCU. In September 2014, TNT acquired the cable broadcast rights for Captain America: Civil War to air two years after its theatrical release.

=== Home media ===
Captain America: Civil War was released on digital download by Walt Disney Studios Home Entertainment on September 2, 2016, and on Blu-ray, Blu-ray 3D and DVD on September 13, 2016. The digital and Blu-ray releases include behind-the-scenes featurettes, audio commentary, deleted scenes, a blooper reel, and an exclusive preview of Doctor Strange. The digital release comes with an exclusive "mockumentary" short film, Team Thor, directed by Thor: Ragnarok director Taika Waititi, which was originally screened at San Diego Comic-Con 2016 and showed what Thor was doing during the events of Civil War. Captain America: Civil War was released on 4K UHD Blu-Ray on April 23, 2019. The IMAX Enhanced version of the film was made available on Disney+ beginning on November 12, 2021.

== Reception ==
=== Box office ===
Captain America: Civil War grossed $408.1 million in the U.S. and Canada and $745.2 million in other territories, for a worldwide total of $1.153 billion. By May 10, 2016, the film had grossed $737.8 million, surpassing the entire theatrical gross of its predecessor, Captain America: The Winter Soldier ($714.4 million). It became the highest-grossing film of 2016, the fourth-highest-grossing superhero film of all time, and the third-highest-grossing film in the U.S. and Canada of 2016, behind Rogue One and Finding Dory. Deadline Hollywood calculated the film's net profit as $193.4 million, accounting for production budgets, marketing, talent participations, and other costs; box office grosses and home media revenues placed it eighth on their list of 2016's "Most Valuable Blockbusters".

==== United States and Canada ====
Two weeks ahead of its release, Fandango announced that the film outsold all previous Marvel Cinematic Universe films at the same point in the sales cycle, and by its opening week, had reached the highest advance sales for a superhero film, representing 90% of the site's weekend ticket sales. Captain America: Civil War earned $75.5 million on its opening day. The film's Friday gross included $25 million from Thursday previews, the second-highest Thursday preview gross among Marvel films, with $3.1 million of the $25 million coming from IMAX theaters, a new Marvel record. The film went on to earn $61.2 million on Saturday and $42.4 million on Sunday, for a total opening weekend gross of $179.1 million, the third-highest for a Marvel film and fifth-highest of all time. Of the $179.1 million, $16 million was from IMAX, the second best for an MCU film. Initial projections for Captain America: Civil War had it earning between $175–200 million on its opening weekend, with the projection being revised to $172–178 million after Friday. BoxOffice called it "the safest box office bet" since Star Wars: The Force Awakens. The film remained at number one in its second weekend, and fell to second in its third, behind The Angry Birds Movie. In its fourth weekend, Captain America: Civil War became the highest-grossing film of 2016 in North America, and by June 17, 2016, became the first film of 2016 to surpass $400 million.

==== Other territories ====
Captain America: Civil War's opening in 15 countries on April 27, 2016, earned $14.9 million, followed by $23.8 million the next day from 15 more countries, and $45.3 million two days later from 8 additional countries, for a three-day total of $84 million. Its first weekend brought a total of $200.4 million, after being projected to earn anywhere between $180–250 million, with $9.4 million coming from IMAX. The film debuted at number one in all countries except Japan. The film stayed at number one in its second weekend, earning $217 million, with existing territories seeing a 55% decline in earnings, while surpassing the entire international earnings of previous Captain America films, along with other MCU films. For IMAX in its second weekend, Captain America: Civil War earned $31 million, a new record for a day-and-date opening for a Marvel film. By its third weekend, the film remained at number one in some territories, being overtaken by The Angry Birds Movie in others, and became the top film of 2016 and fourth-highest-grossing superhero film outside of North America.

It set records for the largest opening day in Mexico ($7.3 million), opening day of 2016 in France ($2.4 million), the second-largest opening day in Brazil ($2.7 million) and the United Arab Emirates, the largest superhero opening day in the Netherlands, and the largest superhero opening in Turkey and Ukraine. It set opening weekend records in Brazil ($12.9 million), Mexico ($20.4 million), and the Philippines ($7.7 million), and was the second-largest opening weekend in Hong Kong ($6.9 million) and Thailand ($9.4 million). In the United Kingdom, the film earned the second-largest opening day and weekend of 2016 with $20.5 million, while France had the top 2016 opening weekend with $10.1 million. Germany had the best four-day opening of 2016 with $8.1 million, and Spain had the second-largest three-day opening of 2016 with $4.2 million. For South Korea, the film was the largest non-Korean opening and largest Marvel opening in history. China had the second best IMAX opening ($9.5 million), as well as the second-largest opening weekend for a Hollywood film ($95.6 million), with the film eventually becoming the third-highest Disney release in the country after 10 days, and the second largest superhero film. Japan saw the film open third with $4.2 million, behind Detective Conan: The Darkest Nightmare ($5.3 million) and Zootopia ($4.8 million). The film's largest markets were China ($190.4 million), South Korea ($62.8 million), and the United Kingdom ($53.2 million).

=== Critical response ===
The review aggregator Rotten Tomatoes reported an approval rating of 90%, with an average score of 7.8/10, based on 430 reviews. The website's critical consensus reads, "Captain America: Civil War begins the next wave of Marvel movies with an action-packed superhero blockbuster boasting a decidedly non-cartoonish plot and the courage to explore thought-provoking themes." Metacritic, which uses a weighted average, assigned a score of 75 out of 100 based on 53 critics, indicating "generally favorable" reviews. Audiences polled by CinemaScore gave the film an "A" grade on an A+ to F scale, while PostTrak reported filmgoers gave it an 88% overall positive score and a 75% "definite recommend".

Justin Chang of Variety called it "the most mature and substantive picture to have yet emerged from the Marvel Cinematic Universe." Sheri Linden of The Hollywood Reporter said, "Call it 'civil war' or call it brand extension; call it a 'cinematic universe' or a corporate behemoth—the latest Marvel extravaganza furthers the studio's cross-pollination of action franchises in a way that's sure to satisfy devotees." Robbie Collin of The Daily Telegraph wrote, "This is the cinematic superhero showdown you've dreamt of since childhood, precisely because that's everything—and all—it wants to be." Catherine Shoard of The Guardian called it, "a huge aspartame rush of a film: a giant irresistible snack, not nutritious, but very tasty." Richard Roeper of the Chicago Sun-Times wrote, "Kudos to co-directors Anthony and Joe Russo and the team of writers for juggling more than a dozen comic-book characters and nearly that many plot lines, and only occasionally getting us (and by us I mean me) lost in the geek weeds." Kenneth Turan of the Los Angeles Times said, "If you live and breathe Marvel, this is one of the MCU's stronger offerings. If you are a spy coming in from the cold, the answer is not so clear." A. O. Scott of The New York Times wrote, "Captain America: Civil War does not in any way transcend the conventions of the genre. On the contrary: It succeeds because it doesn't really try."

Conversely, Stephen Whitty of the New York Daily News said, "Although it's called Captain America: Civil War, the latest Marvel movie is actually a supersized Avengers picture—overstuffed to bursting. And sometimes during its two and a half hour running time, it just goes bust." Mick LaSalle of the San Francisco Chronicle said, "As a work of thought, Civil War is compromised, but at least there are thoughts to compromise. As an action film, it has its moments, but aside from the big opening sequence—the action scenes are a bit flat." Andrew O'Hehir writing for Salon said, "Much of Captain America: Civil War is just the laborious working-out of leftover dangling plot elements from Captain America: The Winter Soldier two summers ago." While Nicholas Barber of the BBC gave the film a generally favorable review, praising both its visuals and action sequences, he criticized the fact that there was "no cogent reason for any of [the Avengers] to be on one side or the other, which is why their inevitable dust-up feels like a game of dodgeball in a school playground." Mark Millar, writer of the "Civil War" comic storyline on which the film was based, felt the film "had a good opening twenty [minutes], but then I honestly can't remember what the movie was about." He also felt the film lacked levity, especially considering the Russo brothers' background in comedy.

=== Accolades ===
Year	Award	Category	Recipient(s)	Result	Ref(s)
2016	Teen Choice Awards	Choice Movie: Sci-Fi/Fantasy	Captain America: Civil War	Won	
2016	Teen Choice Awards	Choice Movie Actor: Sci-Fi/Fantasy	Chris Evans	Won	
2016	Teen Choice Awards	Choice Movie Actor: Sci-Fi/Fantasy	Robert Downey Jr.	Nominated	
2016	Teen Choice Awards	Choice Movie Actress: Sci-Fi/Fantasy	Scarlett Johansson	Nominated	
2016	Teen Choice Awards	Choice Movie: Chemistry	Robert Downey Jr., Scarlett Johansson, Don Cheadle, Paul Bettany, and Chadwick Boseman	Nominated	
2016	Teen Choice Awards	Choice Movie: Chemistry	Chris Evans, Sebastian Stan, Anthony Mackie, Elizabeth Olsen, and Jeremy Renner	Nominated	
2016	Teen Choice Awards	Choice Movie: Liplock	Chris Evans and Emily VanCamp	Nominated	
2016	Teen Choice Awards	Choice Movie: Villain	Daniel Brühl	Nominated	
2016	Teen Choice Awards	Choice Movie: Scene Stealer	Chadwick Boseman	Nominated	
2016	Teen Choice Awards	Choice Movie: Scene Stealer	Tom Holland	Nominated	
2016	Critics' Choice Awards	Best Action Movie	Captain America: Civil War	Nominated	
2016	Critics' Choice Awards	Best Actor in an Action Movie	Chris Evans	Nominated	
2016	Critics' Choice Awards	Best Actress in an Action Movie	Scarlett Johansson	Nominated	
2017	People's Choice Awards	Favorite Movie	Captain America: Civil War	Nominated	
2017	People's Choice Awards	Favorite Action Movie	Captain America: Civil War	Nominated	
2017	People's Choice Awards	Favorite Movie Actor	Robert Downey Jr.	Nominated	
2017	People's Choice Awards	Favorite Movie Actress	Scarlett Johansson	Nominated	
2017	People's Choice Awards	Favorite Action Movie Actor	Chris Evans	Nominated	
2017	People's Choice Awards	Favorite Action Movie Actor	Robert Downey Jr.	Won	
2017	People's Choice Awards	Favorite Action Movie Actress	Scarlett Johansson	Nominated	
2017	Screen Actors Guild Awards	Outstanding Performance by a Stunt Ensemble in a Motion Picture	Captain America: Civil War	Nominated	
2017	Annie Awards	Outstanding Achievement, Character Animation in a Live Action Production	Captain America: Civil War - Spider-Man - Steve Rawlins, Ebrahim Jahromi, Cedric Lo, Stephen King, and Yair Gutierrez	Nominated	
2017	NAACP Image Awards	Outstanding Supporting Actor in a Motion Picture	Chadwick Boseman	Nominated	
2017	NAACP Image Awards	Outstanding Directing in a Motion Picture	Anthony and Joe Russo	Nominated	
2017	Kids' Choice Awards	Favorite Movie	Captain America: Civil War	Nominated	
2017	Kids' Choice Awards	Favorite Movie Actor	Robert Downey Jr.	Nominated	
2017	Kids' Choice Awards	Favorite Movie Actor	Chris Evans	Nominated	
2017	Kids' Choice Awards	Favorite Movie Actress	Scarlett Johansson	Nominated	
2017	Kids' Choice Awards	Favorite Butt-Kicker	Chris Evans	Won	
2017	Kids' Choice Awards	Favorite Butt-Kicker	Scarlett Johansson	Nominated	
2017	Kids' Choice Awards	Favorite Frenemies	Chris Evans & Robert Downey Jr.	Nominated	
2017	Kids' Choice Awards	#SQUAD	Chris Evans, Robert Downey Jr., Scarlett Johansson, Sebastian Stan, Anthony Mackie, Don Cheadle, Jeremy Renner, Chadwick Boseman	Nominated	
2017	Empire Awards	Best Male Newcomer	Tom Holland	Nominated	
2017	Empire Awards	Best Thriller	Captain America: Civil War	Nominated	
2017	Empire Awards	Best Costume Design	Judianna Makovsky	Nominated	
2017	Empire Awards	Best Visual Effects	Captain America: Civil War	Nominated	
2017	Saturn Awards	Best Comic-to-Film Motion Picture	Captain America: Civil War	Nominated	
2017	Saturn Awards	Best Director	Anthony and Joe Russo	Nominated	
2017	Saturn Awards	Best Actor	Chris Evans	Nominated	
2017	Saturn Awards	Best Supporting Actor	Chadwick Boseman	Nominated	
2017	Saturn Awards	Best Supporting Actress	Scarlett Johansson	Nominated	
2017	Saturn Awards	Best Performance by a Younger Actor	Tom Holland	Won	
2017	Saturn Awards	Best Editing	Jeffrey Ford and Matthew Schmidt	Nominated	
2017	Saturn Awards	Best Production Design	Owen Paterson	Nominated	

== Future ==
=== Potential Evans solo film ===
Feige described Civil War as the conclusion of the Captain America trilogy that began with The First Avenger. While it was the final standalone Captain America film in Evans's contract with Marvel Studios, he said in September 2015 that he was open to extending his contract past Avengers: Infinity War (2018) and Avengers: Endgame (2019), the final films in his contract at the time. In Endgame, Rogers passes the mantle of Captain America to Sam Wilson. After completing work on that film in 2018, Feige and Marvel Studios co-president Louis D'Esposito told Evans that they wanted to continue making films with him as Rogers, who would take on the new mantle of Nomad as the character does in the comics. They gave him a pitch for a new film that "didn’t feel right" to the actor, but he was open to future ideas. In November 2018, Joe Russo said Evans was "not done yet" with the MCU after Endgame. A year later, Evans was asked if he would reprise his role and said, "You never say never. I love the character. I don't know... It's not a hard no, but it's not an eager yes either."

In January 2021, Evans was reportedly close to signing a deal to reprise his role in at least one future project. Evans's involvement was said to be similar to how Downey had supporting roles in other film franchises, such as Civil War, after concluding the Iron Man film series with Iron Man 3 (2013). Evans soon said the report was "news to [him]". His potential return was reported to be in a project separate from Captain America: Brave New World (2025), which stars Mackie as Sam Wilson / Captain America. A planned solo film was believed to have also included Hayley Atwell reprising her role as Peggy Carter, but Marvel Studios was unable to get the story for the film to a place where development could proceed. Evans said he received at least a dozen pitches from Marvel over the years and none of them felt right to him. Evans did appear in the Marvel Studios film Deadpool & Wolverine (2024), reprising his pre-MCU role of Johnny Storm / Human Torch from 20th Century Fox's Fantastic Four (2005) and Fantastic Four: Rise of the Silver Surfer (2007).

By late 2024, the studio believed their next Avengers films, Avengers: Doomsday (2026) and Avengers: Secret Wars (2027), were better opportunities to revisit Rogers and Carter than a standalone film, and Evans agreed to join the films after hearing a pitch from the Russos and learning that Downey was also returning to star in the films. Atwell also reprises her role in both films.

=== Sam Wilson's Captain America ===
One of Marvel Studios' Disney+ miniseries, The Falcon and the Winter Soldier, was released in 2021, with Malcolm Spellman serving as head writer and Kari Skogland directing. It centered on Mackie's Sam Wilson / Falcon and Stan's Bucky Barnes / Winter Soldier, with Cheadle, Brühl, VanCamp, and Kasumba reprising their roles as James "Rhodey" Rhodes, Helmut Zemo, Sharon Carter, and Ayo, respectively, along with Georges St-Pierre as Georges Batroc from Captain America: The Winter Soldier.

A fourth film, Captain America: Brave New World, was released on February 14, 2025, directed by Julius Onah, and written by Spellman, Dalan Musson (a series writer on The Falcon and the Winter Soldier), and Matthew Orton. It serves as a continuation of the events of The Falcon and the Winter Soldier, focusing on Sam Wilson. Mackie, Danny Ramirez, Carl Lumbly, and Stan reprise their respective roles of Wilson, Joaquin Torres, Isaiah Bradley, and Barnes from The Falcon and the Winter Soldier, along with Tim Blake Nelson and Liv Tyler reprising their roles as Samuel Sterns / Leader and Betty Ross from The Incredible Hulk (2008). Shira Haas appears as Ruth Bat-Seraph, while Harrison Ford appears as Thaddeus Ross, replacing Hurt following his death in 2022.
