= Web Slingers: A Spider-Man Adventure =

Interactive screen ride at Disney parks

Web Slingers A Spider-Man Adventure
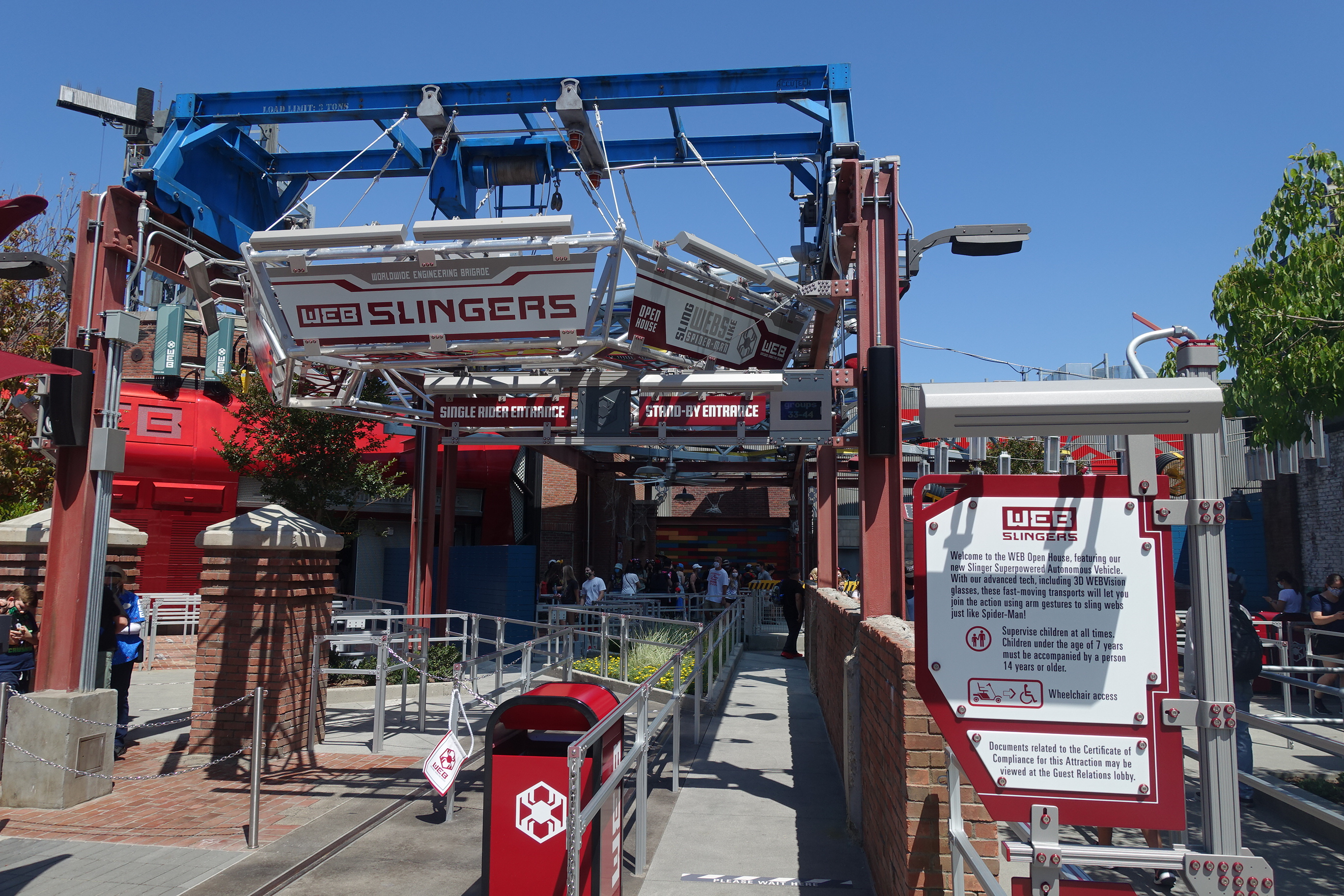
- Attraction entrance at Disney California Adventure

Disney California Adventure
- Area: Avengers Campus
- Coordinates: 33.8070°N 117.9187°W
- Status: Operating
- Opening date: June 4, 2021; 5 years ago
- Replaced: It's Tough to Be a Bug!
- Lightning Lane available
- Single rider line available

Disney Adventure World
- Name: Spider-Man W.E.B. Adventure
- Area: Avengers Campus
- Status: Operating
- Soft opening date: July 9, 2022; 4 years ago
- Opening date: July 20, 2022; 4 years ago
- Replaced: Armageddon – Les Effets Speciaux
- Disney Premier Access available

Ride statistics
- Attraction type: Shooting dark ride
- Designer: Walt Disney Imagineering
- Theme: Spider-Man
- Music: Michael Giacchino
- Riders per vehicle: 8
- Rows: 2
- Riders per row: 4
- Pre-show host: Peter Parker / Spider-Man (Tom Holland)
- Ride host: Spider-Man
- Wheelchair accessible
- Closed captioning available

Web Slingers: A Spider-Man Adventure (stylized as WEB SLINGERS: A Spider-Man Adventure) is an interactive screen ride themed to the Marvel Cinematic Universe character Spider-Man at Disney California Adventure in Anaheim, California and Disney Adventure World in Marne-la-Vallée, Île-de-France, France as part of their respective Avengers Campuses. At Disney Adventure World, the attraction is alternatively titled Spider-Man W.E.B. Adventure.

== Summary ==
Guests are visiting the Worldwide Engineering Brigade (WEB) during their open house. However, an emergency situation arises, and using WEB's latest invention, the WEB Slinger vehicle, guests help capture the Spider-Bots that have wreaked havoc on the Avengers Campus. The attraction is a blend of physical sets and virtual environments.

=== Queue and preshow ===
Guests enter the main headquarters of WEB, a program funded by Tony Stark to bring the world's youngest engineers together to build innovative technology for the future, as it is hosting an open house. As they enter the main area, they learn more about WEB and the main engineers enlisted in the program (Harley Keener, Onome, Doreen Green, and Lunella Lafayette). They are guided to the lab by the artificial intelligence S.H.A.R.I.N., who introduces them to one of the lead WEB engineers, Peter Parker. Peter reveals that the guests will be testing out the new WEB Slinger vehicles that allows them to shoot webs like Spider-Man. As he is explaining this, one of the program's newest inventions, a robotic helper called the Spider-Bot, malfunctions and begins endlessly replicating itself, and they begin tearing down the facility. If they are not stopped, they could destroy the rest of Avengers Campus and pose a threat to the planet.

Peter insists that Sharin does not need to contact Tony for help. Sharin instead contacts Spider-Man. Instantly, Peter receives a notification on his phone and leaves the room to "find" Spider-Man. He soon returns in his Spider-Man outfit. Sharin offers to contact the Avengers, but Spider-Man instead recruits the guests to help. He and Sharin instruct the guests to use the WEB Slinger vehicles so they can team up to stop the self-replicating Spider-Bots.

=== Ride ===
After guests enter the vehicle, Spider-Man opens the doors to the WEB prototype garage and instructs them to web up and capture all the loose Spider-Bots as he seals off the exits. The Spider-Bots then enter through the tunnels and into Pym Test Kitchen. One of the Spider-Bots becomes giant after being exposed to Pym Particles, but Spider-Man manages to tie it up with his web and kick it into an area testing alien technology.

Spider-Man and the guests then enter the Tivan Collection. While battling the Spider-Bots, Spider-Man is captured and placed in one of the Collector's display cases, but manages to escape with help from the guests.

As they approach the Quinjet Hangar, Sharin informs the guests that the giant Spider-Bot survived and is now glowing green. Spider-Man noticed that the green bots explode when they are hit, and believes they could trigger a chain reaction if they focus on them. After stopping the Spider-Bots from hijacking the Quinjet, Spider-Man and the guests corner the giant, green Spider-Bot in the back of the hangar and cause it to explode, which destroys the rest of the Spider-Bots in the process. Sharin commends Spider-Man for solving the problem, and he remarks that he could not have done it without the guests' help. As the vehicles approach the unload area, Sharin and Peter both agree that they should inform Tony of what has occurred.

== Cast ==
- Tom Holland as Peter Parker / Spider-Man
- Cheryl Texiera as S.H.A.R.I.N.

== Reception ==
While the attraction's motion-tracking technology has been praised, there has also been criticism regarding the "WEB Power Band" peripherals available for purchase that improve the rider's abilities within the attraction.

== In other media ==
The Worldwide Engineering Brigade is introduced in the Marvel Studios Animation series Your Friendly Neighborhood Spider-Man.

== See also ==
- Avengers Campus
  - Avengers Assemble: Flight Force
  - Iron Man Experience
  - Guardians of the Galaxy – Mission: Breakout!
  - Ant-Man and The Wasp: Nano Battle!
  - Avengers Infinity Defense
  - Stark Flight Lab
