= Red Car Trolley =

Former attraction at Disney California Adventure

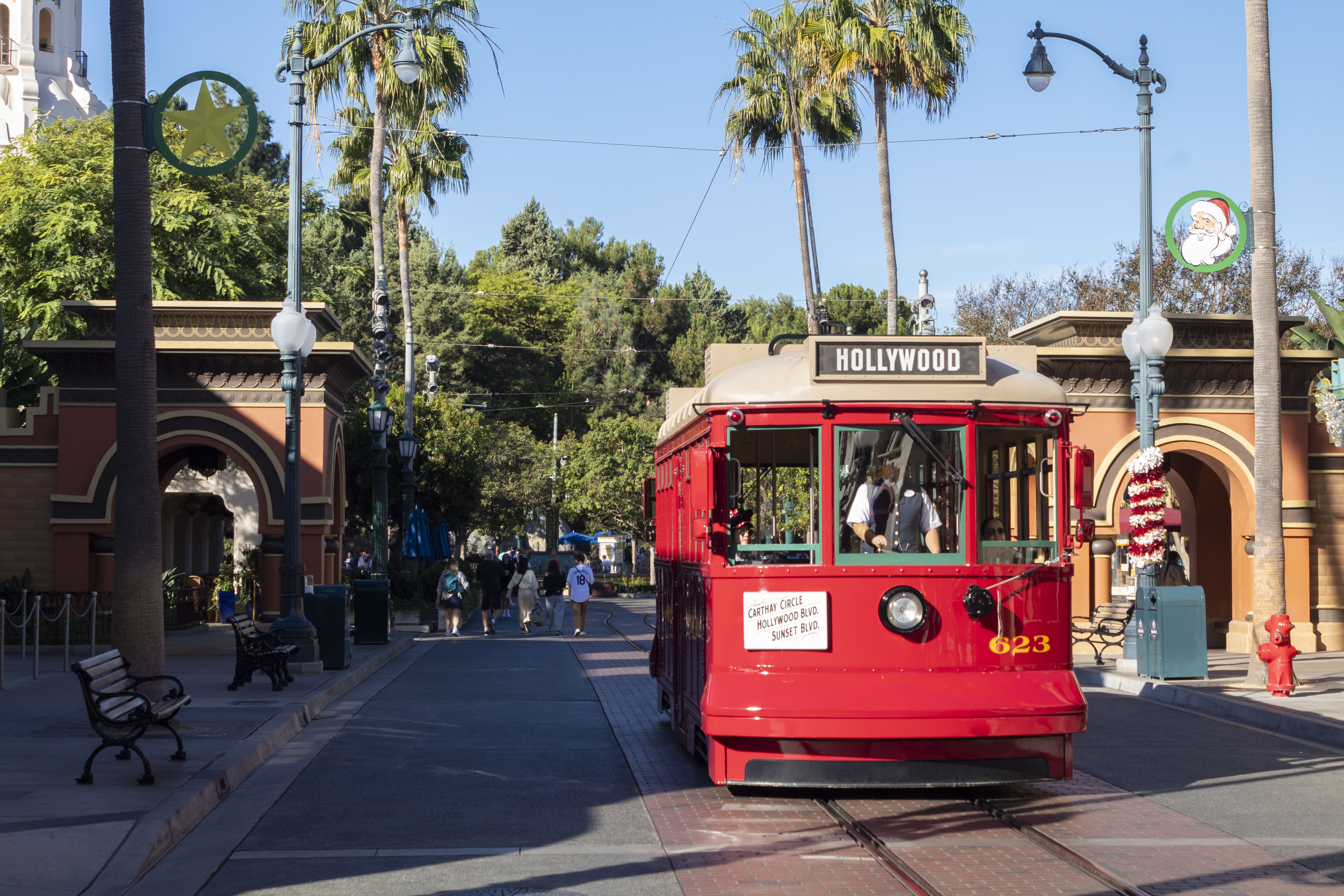
- Red Car Trolley No. 623 during the 2024 holiday season.

Disney California Adventure
- Area: Buena Vista Street / Hollywood Land
- Coordinates: 33°48′30″N 117°55′09″W
- Status: Closed
- Opening date: June 15, 2012
- Closing date: February 9, 2025
- Replaced by: Expansion of Avengers Campus (Avengers Infinity Defense and Stark Flight Lab)

Ride statistics
- Attraction type: Trolley
- Manufacturer: Brookville Equipment Corporation
- Designer: Walt Disney Imagineering
- Theme: Pacific Electric Railway
- Length: 1,744 ft (532 m)
- Speed: 4 mph (6.4 km/h)
- Vehicles: 2
- Riders per vehicle: 21
- Wheelchair accessible

The Red Car Trolley was a 3 ft 3 3/8 in (1,000 mm) meter gauge tramway and transportation attraction at Disney California Adventure at the Disneyland Resort in Anaheim, California. Construction began on January 4, 2010, and the attraction opened on June 15, 2012, as part of the re-dedication of the park. The attraction featured cars inspired by the Pacific Electric Railway's "Red Cars" that once traversed much of Southern California. It provided transportation between the park's main entry at Buena Vista Street and Sunset Boulevard in Hollywood Land.

In August 2024, it was announced that the Red Car Trolley would close in early 2025 as the backstage trolley barn was removed to make way for the expansion of Avengers Campus. The attraction's final day of operation was February 8, 2025. A trolley remains parked on Buena Vista Street for photo opportunities.

== Operation ==
=== Frequency ===
Trolleys ran approximately every 8 minutes while the park was open. Unlike the Main Street Vehicles at neighboring Disneyland, the Red Car Trolley ran all day, briefly pausing service when a parade traveled down Hollywood Boulevard.

=== Vehicles ===
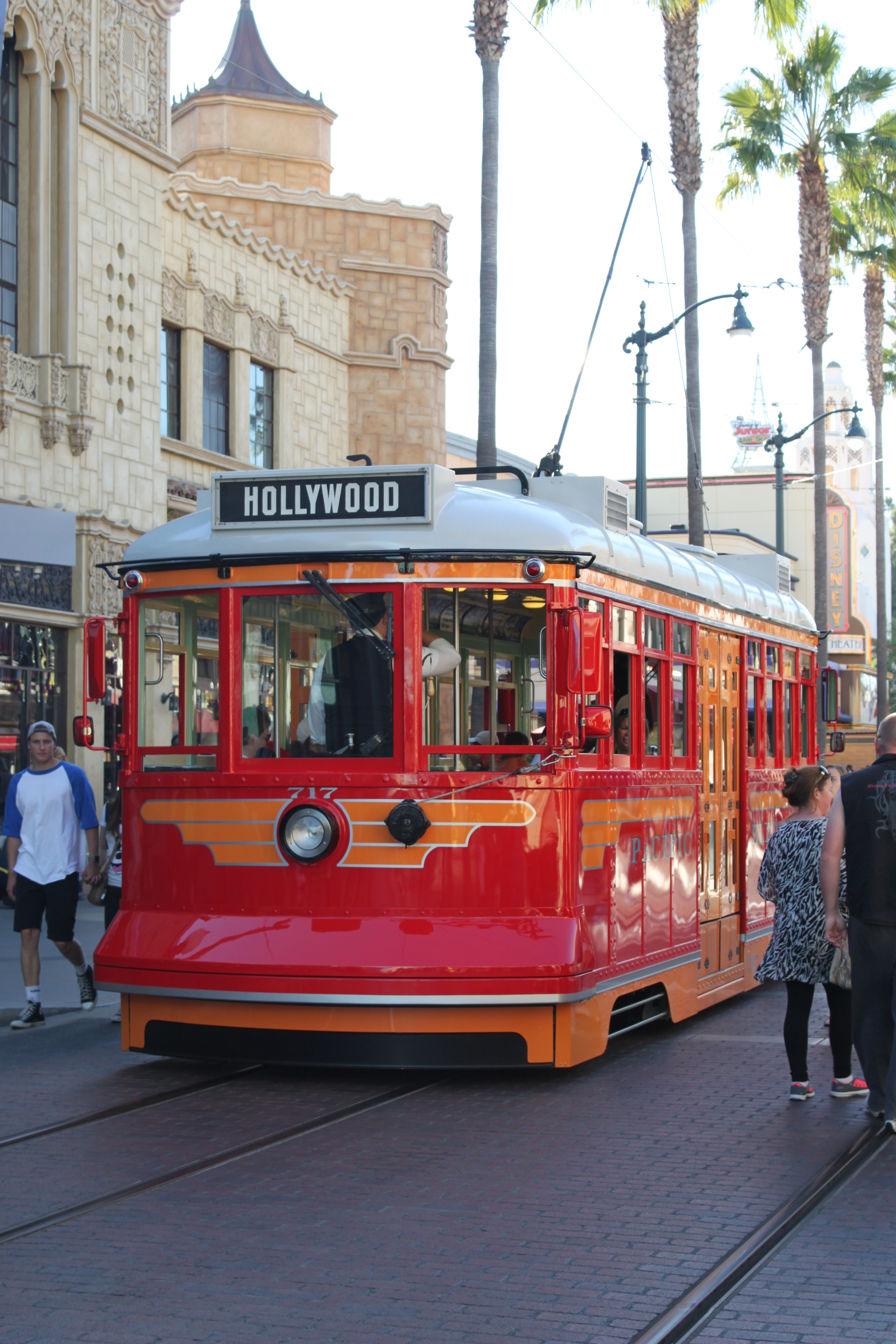
Car 717 wore a paint scheme inspired by the Pacific Electric's Art Deco "wings"

The line had two trolley cars, built by Brookville Equipment, a manufacturer of diesel switcher locomotives and a rebuilder of classic trolley cars. The design of the Red Car Trolley rolling stock are inspired by the Pacific Electric "Hollywood" class cars, built in the 1920s.

- Car 623 is inspired by the 600-series trolleys built by the St. Louis Car Company in 1922, and wears a paint scheme similar to the one used when the "Hollywood" cars were first delivered. The "23" in the car's number is a reference to the year 1923 when Walt Disney arrived in California.
- Car 717 is inspired by the 700–750–series trolleys built by the J. G. Brill Company in 1925, and wears a paint scheme similar to Pacific Electric's iconic Art Deco “wings” design. The car's number "717" is a reference to the opening date of Disneyland; July 17, 1955.

Unlike the original Pacific Electric trolley cars, which drew their power from an overhead wire, the "Red Car Trolley" cars were battery-operated. The onboard batteries were fully recharged overnight in the car barn, and the battery was periodically "topped off" through non-contact charging using induction coils in the ground where the cars rested at the Sunset Boulevard stop. The trolley poles on the cars and the overhead catenary lines through the park are not energized and were added to enhance authenticity.

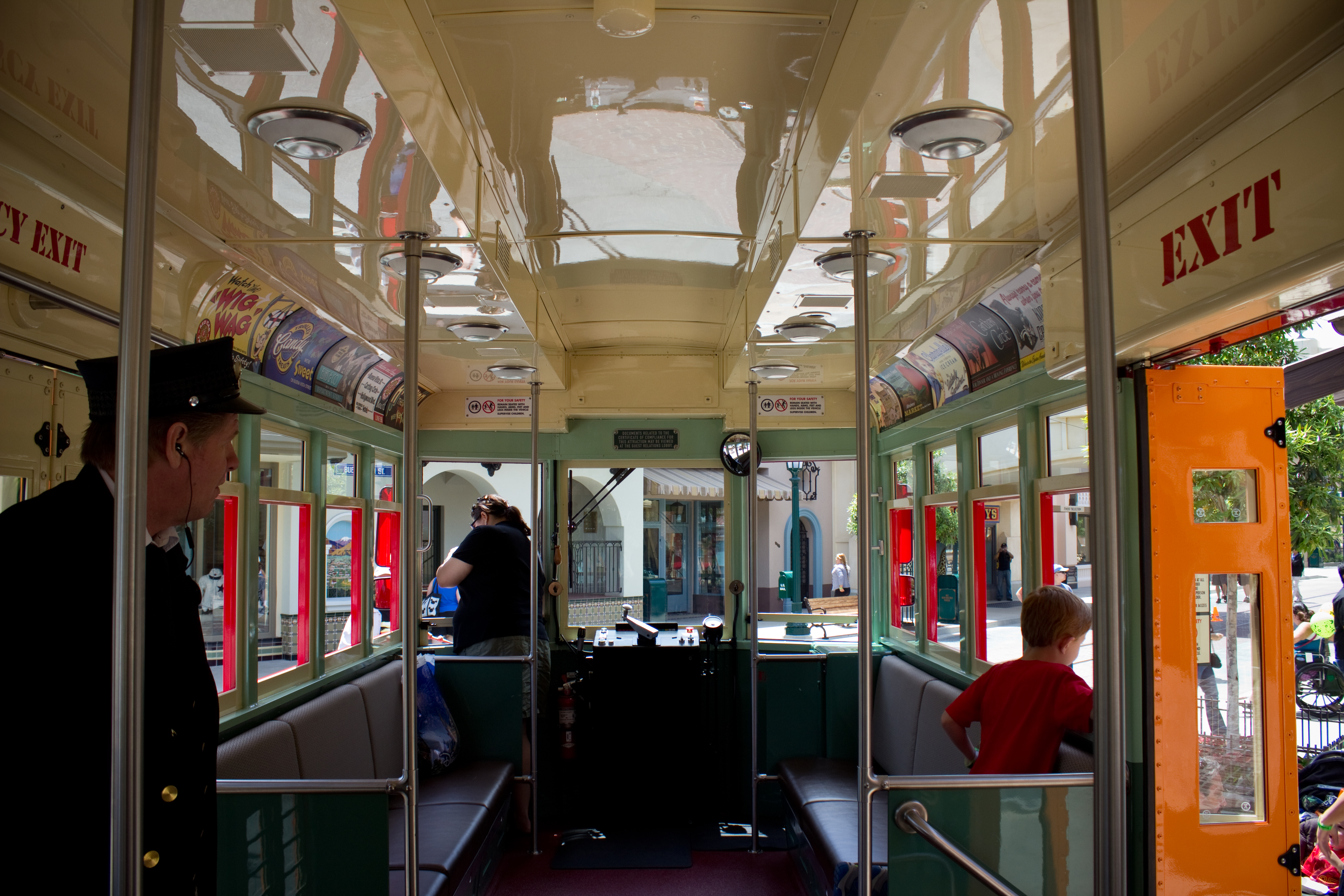
Red Car Trolley interior as seen in 2012.

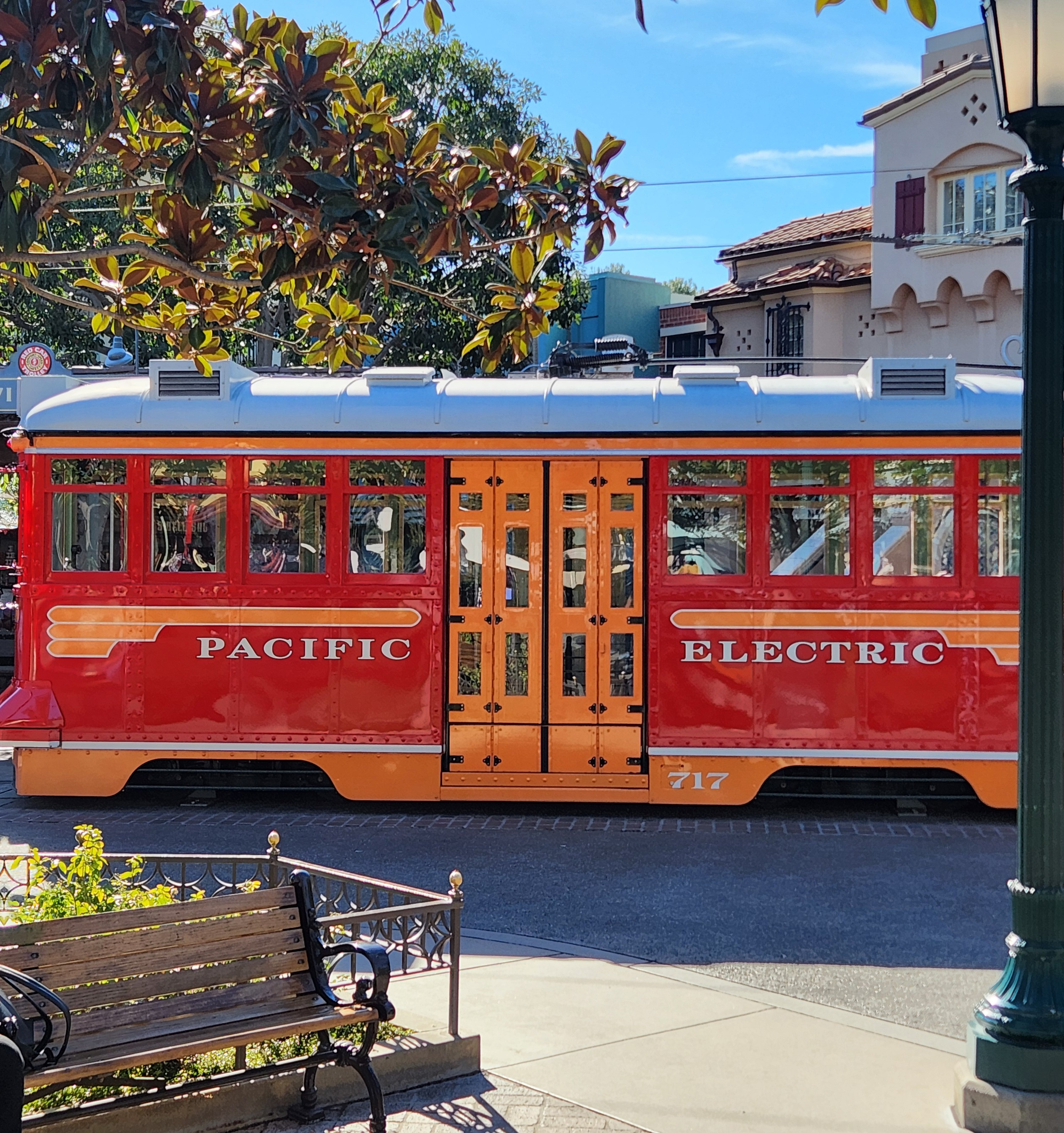
Car 717 parked on Buena Vista Street in 2026

=== Stops ===
The Red Car Trolley line had four stops throughout Buena Vista Street and Hollywood Land:

- Buena Vista Street at Buena Vista Entry Plaza
- Carthay Circle at the Carthay Circle Theater
- Hollywood Boulevard at Animation Academy (Sunset Boulevard-bound only)
- Sunset Boulevard across from the Hyperion Theater

=== Former stops ===
- Guardians of the Galaxy – Mission: Breakout!
- The Twilight Zone Tower of Terror

== See also ==
- 2012 in amusement parks
- List of former Disney California Adventure attractions
- Rail transport in Walt Disney Parks and Resorts
