= Buena Vista Street =

Themed land at Disney California Adventure

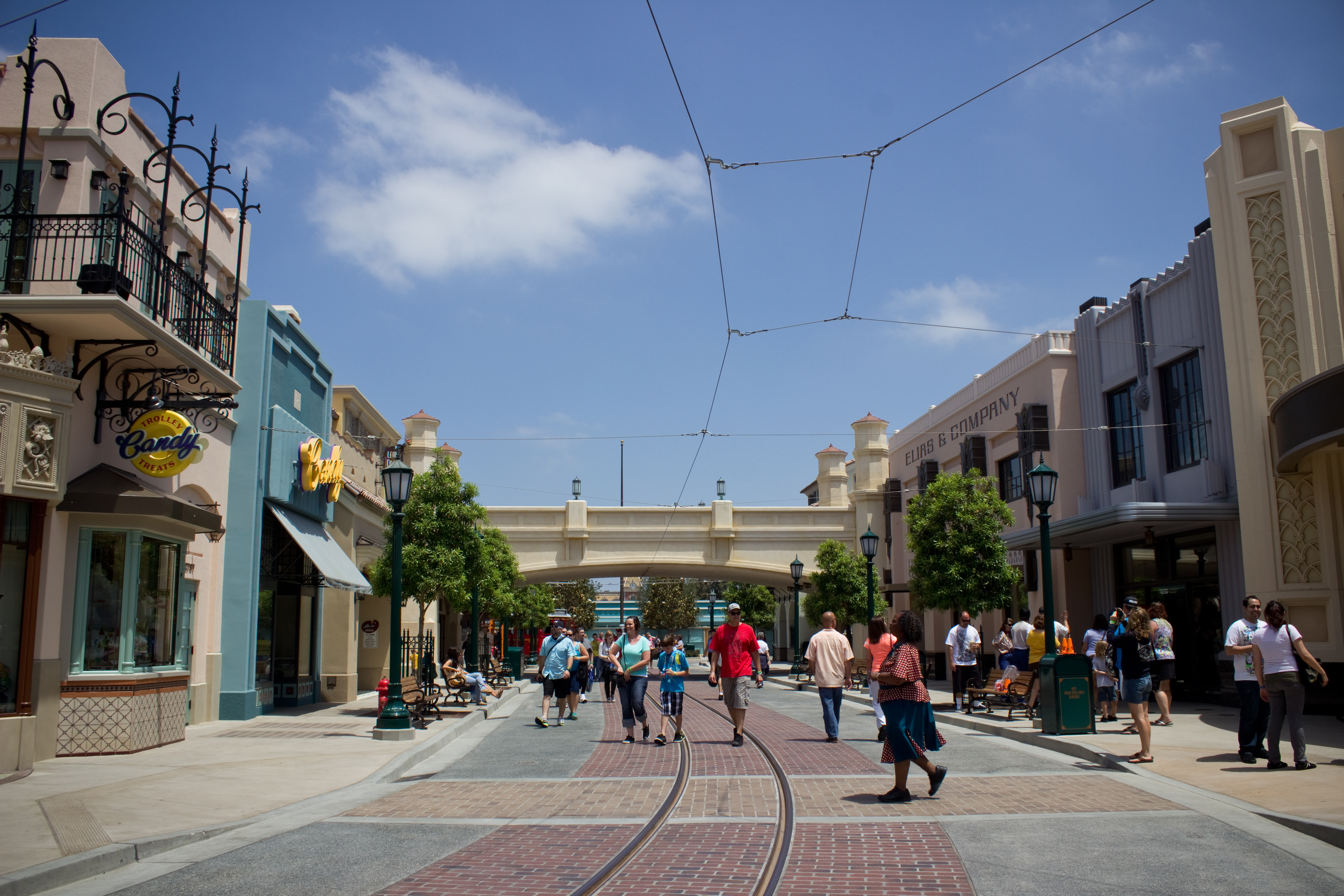
- Interactive map of Buena Vista Street
- Theme: 20th Century Art Deco/Mission street

Disney California Adventure
- Coordinates: 33°48′30.34″N 117°55′8.33″W
- Status: Operating
- Opened: February 8, 2001; 24 years ago (as Sunshine Plaza); June 15, 2012; 13 years ago (as Buena Vista Street)
- Replaced: Sunshine Plaza

Buena Vista Street (formerly known as Sunshine Plaza) is a themed land at Disney California Adventure amusement park at the Disneyland Resort in Anaheim, California, United States. Though named for Buena Vista Street, the real-life Burbank thoroughfare that the Walt Disney Studios sits on, the central plaza represents Los Angeles, and specifically the Los Feliz area around Hyperion Avenue, in the 1920s when Walt Disney first arrived there. One of the main features is a small-scale replica of the Hyperion Bridge, which was being constructed when Disney stayed in Atwater Village. The replica functions as a working bridge for the resort's monorail system.

This land is similar to the layout and style of Main Street, USA at Disneyland, Disney California Adventure's sister park. It includes dining, shopping, parades, and entertainment.

== History ==
=== Sunshine Plaza ===
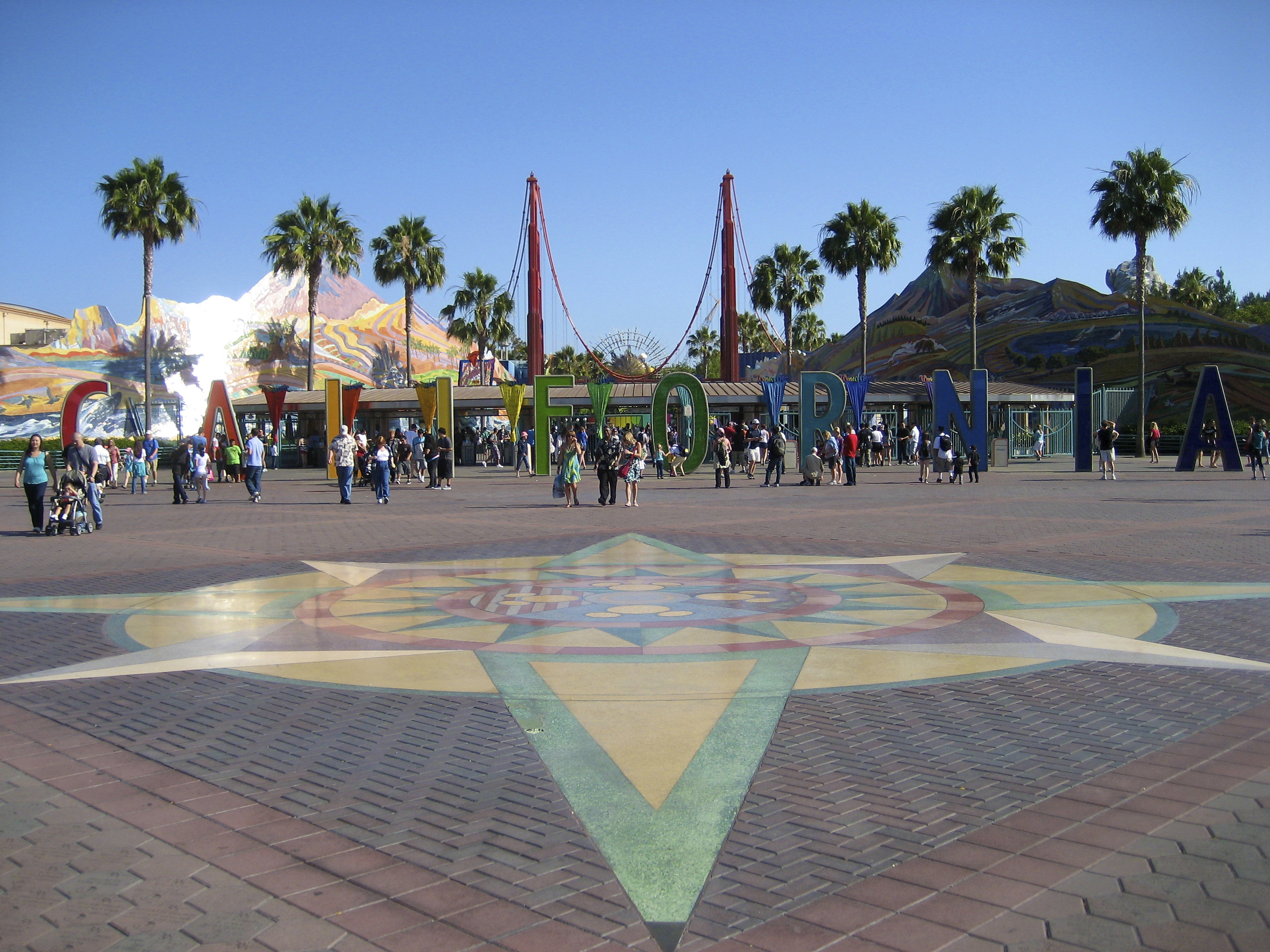
The original entrance of Disney California Adventure, pictured in 2010.

Disney California Adventure's original main gate entrance, Sunshine Plaza, was designed to evoke a sensation as if one were stepping into a California postcard. After guests pass the giant letters spelling out California, they would pass beneath a mock-up of the Golden Gate Bridge, which served to disguise a portion of the resort's monorail track. Flanking both ends of the faux Golden Gate Bridge were two massive murals depicting the vast mountain ranges in California. A few meters into the park from the main gate was Sunshine Plaza that served as an access hub to all of the park's other themed lands. At the end of the path, there was a fountain featuring a large metal sunburst designed to reflect solar rays into the surrounding area. Sunshine Plaza was also home to a replica of the California Zephyr, which housed the plaza's two counter service restaurants: Baker's Field Bakery and Bur-r-r Bank Ice Cream. The plaza was also home to two of the park's biggest souvenir shops, Greetings from California and Engine Ears Toys.

=== Redesign and expansion ===
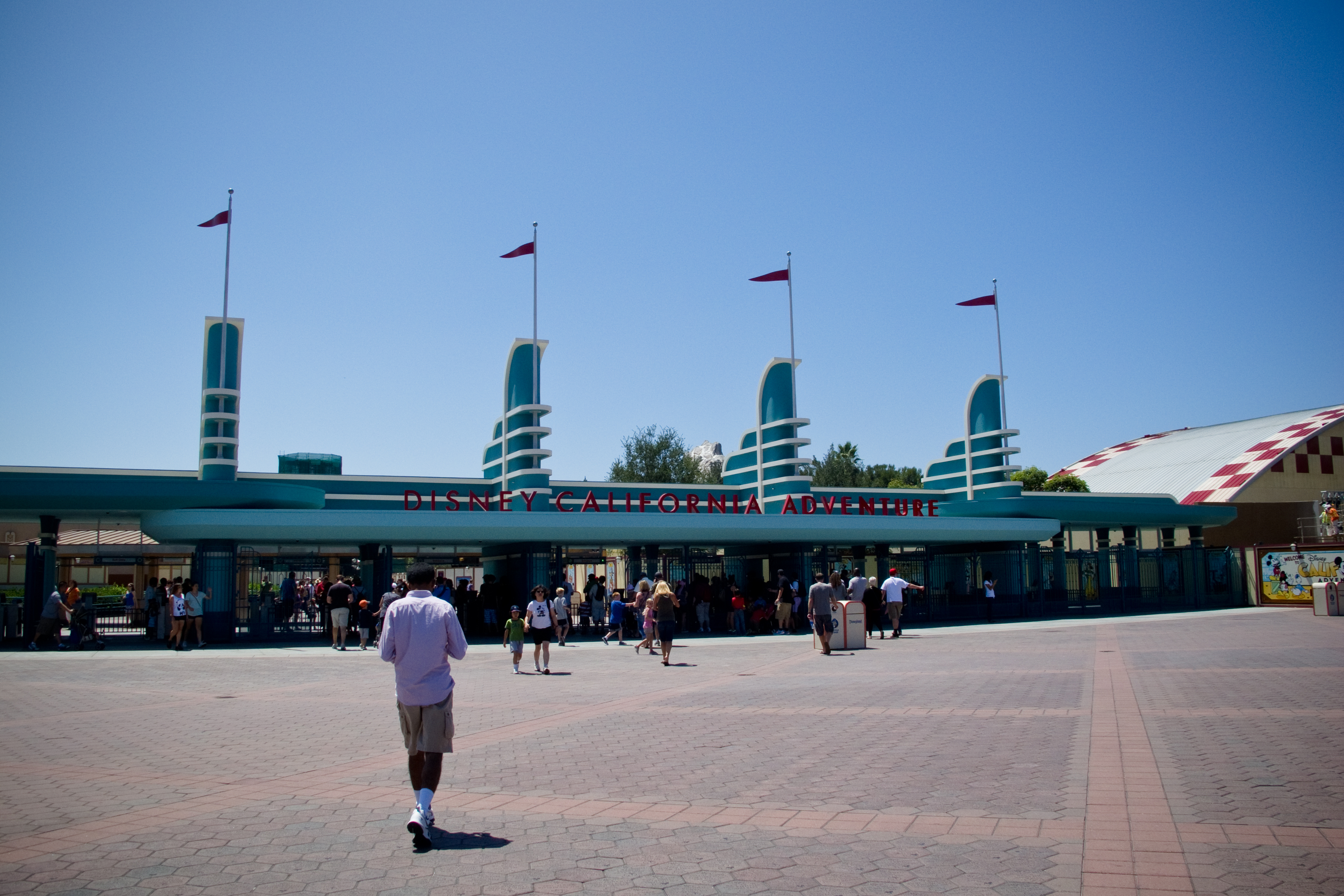
The current entrance of Disney California Adventure, pictured in 2011.

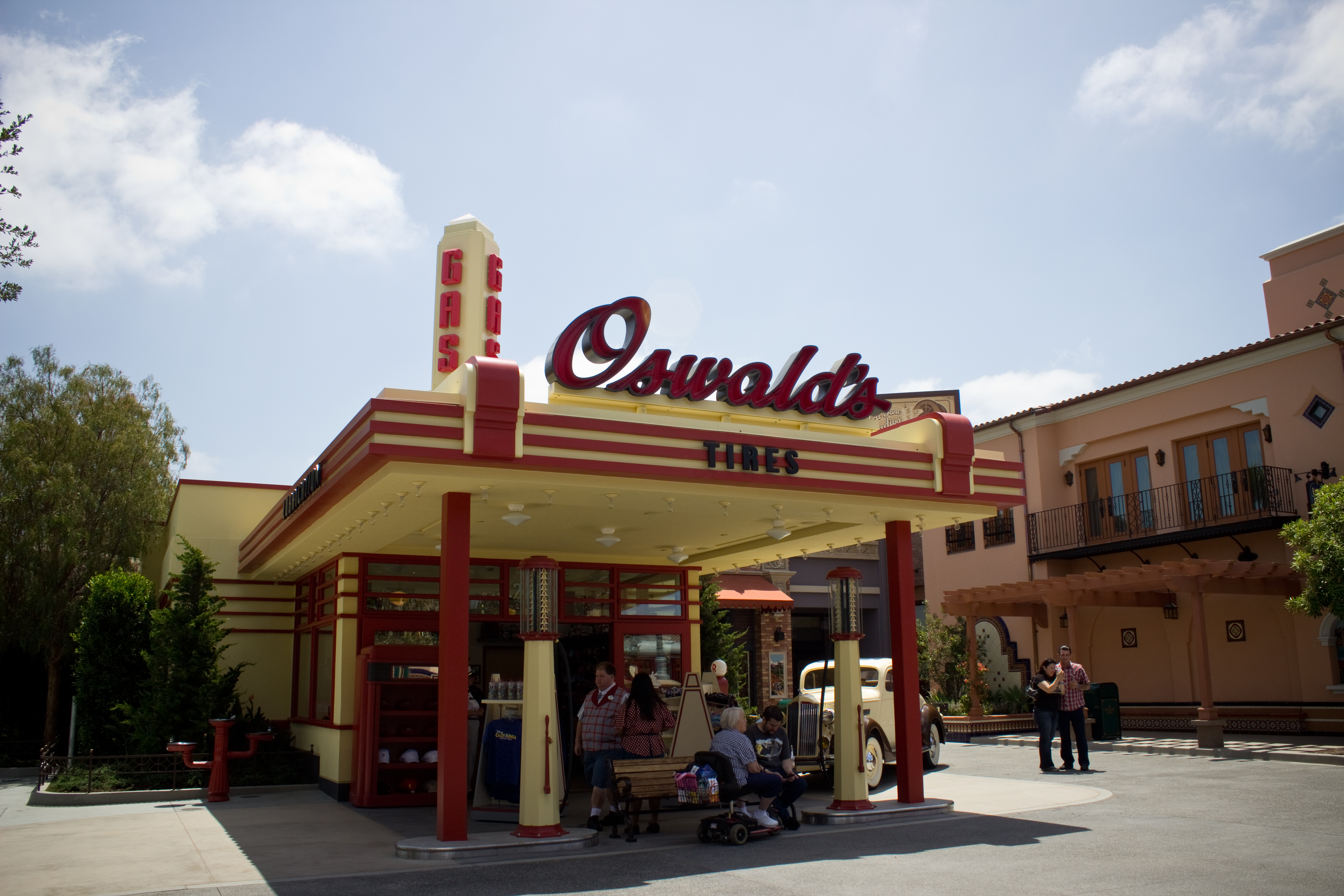
Oswald's Filling Station.

On October 17, 2007, The Walt Disney Company announced a multi-year, $1.1 billion expansion plan for Disney California Adventure. Included in this expansion plan was the re-theming and complete overhaul of Sunshine Plaza into Buena Vista Street.

The Golden Gate Bridge replica was removed and the sunburst structure replaced with a recreation of the Carthay Circle Theater, which showcased the world premiere of Disney Animation's first feature film Snow White and the Seven Dwarfs in 1937. The building serves as the new visual centerpiece of Disney California Adventure's reincarnation. In early August 2011, the California Zephyr display was removed, with major portions being donated to the Western Pacific Railroad Museum.

The park's main gate was extended outward to where the postcard letters formerly stood, and resembles the Pan-Pacific Auditorium, similar to the entrance of Disney's Hollywood Studios in Florida. The Red Car Trolley traveled through the plaza. The main gate was opened on July 15, 2011. The construction of the Red Car trolleys began on January 10, 2010. Construction of Buena Vista Street itself began in October 2010 and opened on June 15, 2012. Throughout construction, the main entrance remained open with areas blocked off from time to time to aid in construction. In December 2024, it was announced that the final day of operation for the Red Car Trolley would be February 8, 2025, as the backstage trolley barn was removed to make way for the expansion of Avengers Campus. A trolley remains parked on Buena Vista Street for photo opportunities.

=== COVID-19 pandemic ===
On November 19, 2020, Buena Vista Street was made accessible as a temporary extension of the nearby, unticketed Downtown Disney District for shopping and dining while the remainder of Disney California Adventure remained closed due to the COVID-19 pandemic. The land returned to its normal, ticketed operation when Disney California Adventure re-opened on April 30, 2021.

== See also ==
- 2012 in amusement parks
- Hollywood Land
- Main Street, USA
