= Pym Test Kitchen =

Themed restaurant in Disney's California Adventure

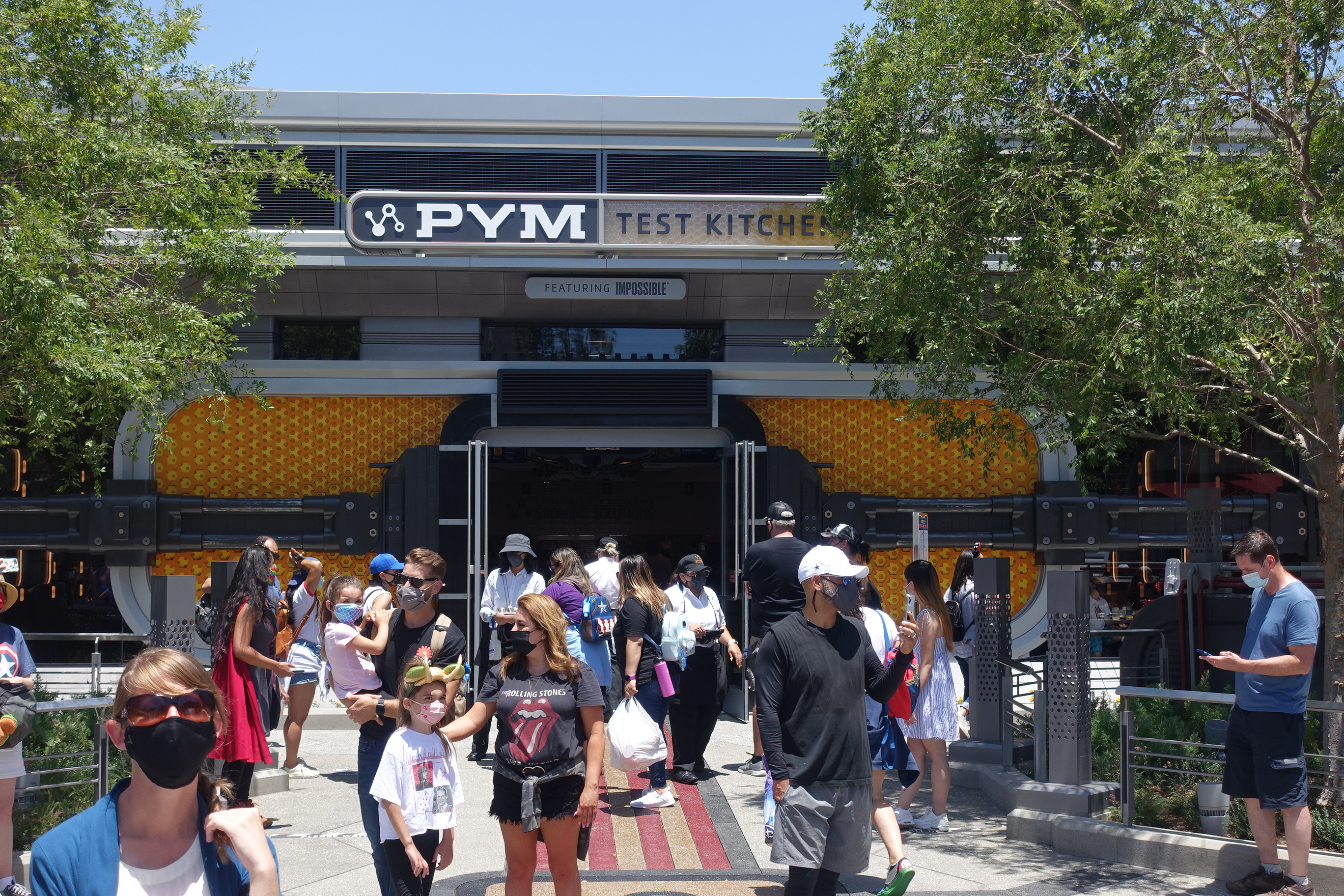
- Interactive map of Pym Test Kitchen

Restaurant information
- Established: June 4, 2021
- Owner: Disney Experiences
- Location: Anaheim, Orange County, California, United States
- Coordinates: 33.8068°N 117.9177°W

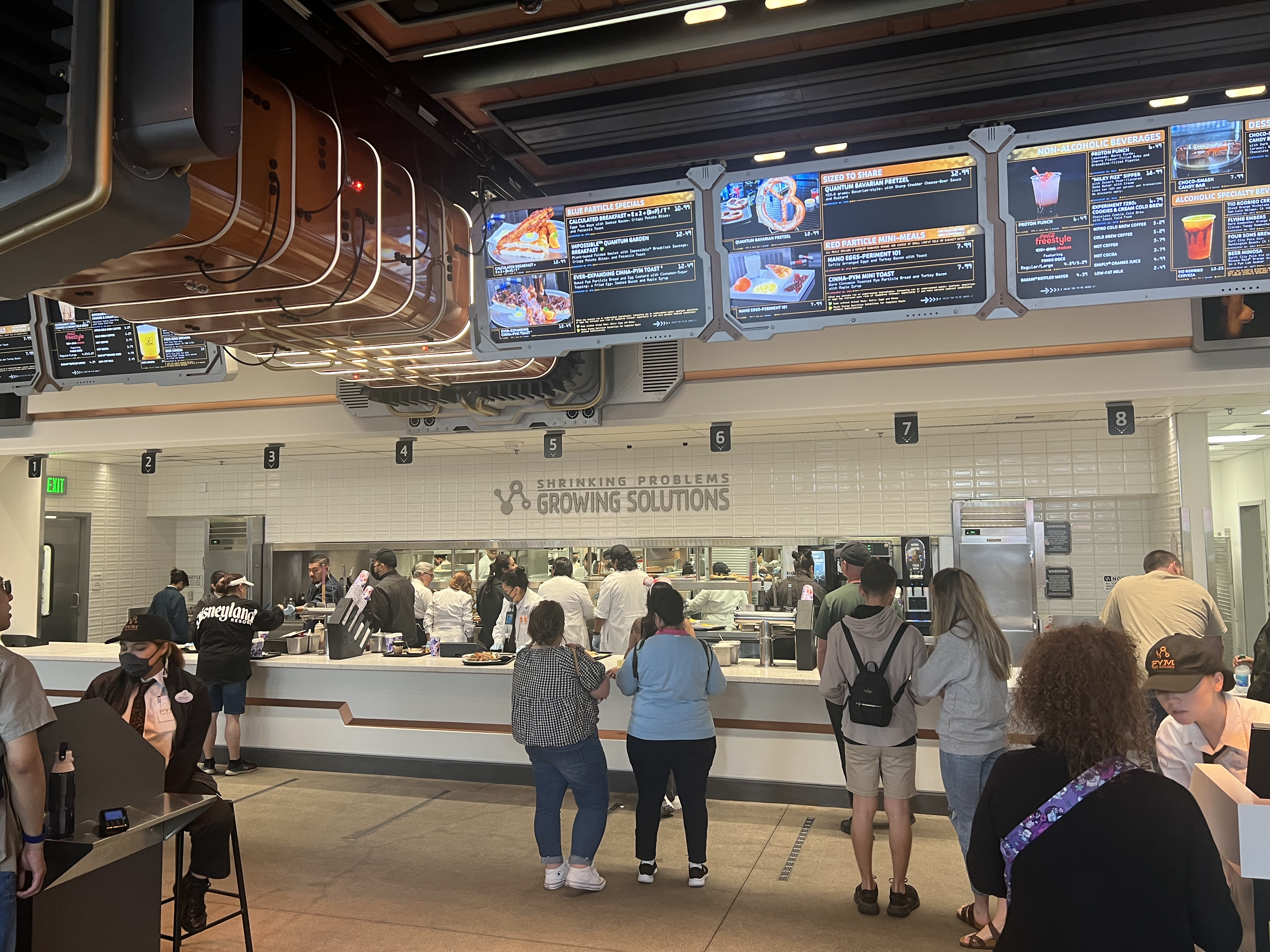
The interior portion of the restaurant

Pym Test Kitchen is a quick-service restaurant located in Avengers Campus at Disney California Adventure in Disneyland Resort in Anaheim, California, United States. It is themed after the Marvel Cinematic Universe character Ant-Man and sells disproportionately-sized food. The restaurant was opened in June 2021.

== Overview ==
The Pym Test Kitchen opened alongside the rest of Avengers Campus on June 4, 2021. The restaurant is designed as a lab where the characters of Ant-Man and the Wasp use special technology to change the size of food to unusual scales. In addition, some of the menu screens are themed as cellphone screens that have been enlarged.

Food served at the restaurant has included the Not-So Little Chicken Sandwich, Cinna-Pym Toast, salad, spaghetti and meatballs, and an oversized chocolate bar known as the Choco-Smash. The restaurant also serves plant-based Impossible Foods meat. To coincide with the release of Ant-Man and the Wasp: Quantumania in 2023, a drink known as the Quantum Ooze was added to the menu. SFGate felt the restaurant served "some of the best quick-service food in all of Disneyland".

One of the sandwiches at the restaurant, the Pym-ini, went viral on social media due to being sold for $99.99, and thus making it one of the most expensive sandwiches in the world. The panini-style sandwich contained ham, provolone cheese, pistachios, and sun-dried tomato served on focaccia flatbread, and was meant for six-to-eight people according to Disney. Individual slices could be purchased for about $15.
