= Guardians of the Galaxy – Mission: Breakout! =

Drop tower dark ride at Disney California Adventure

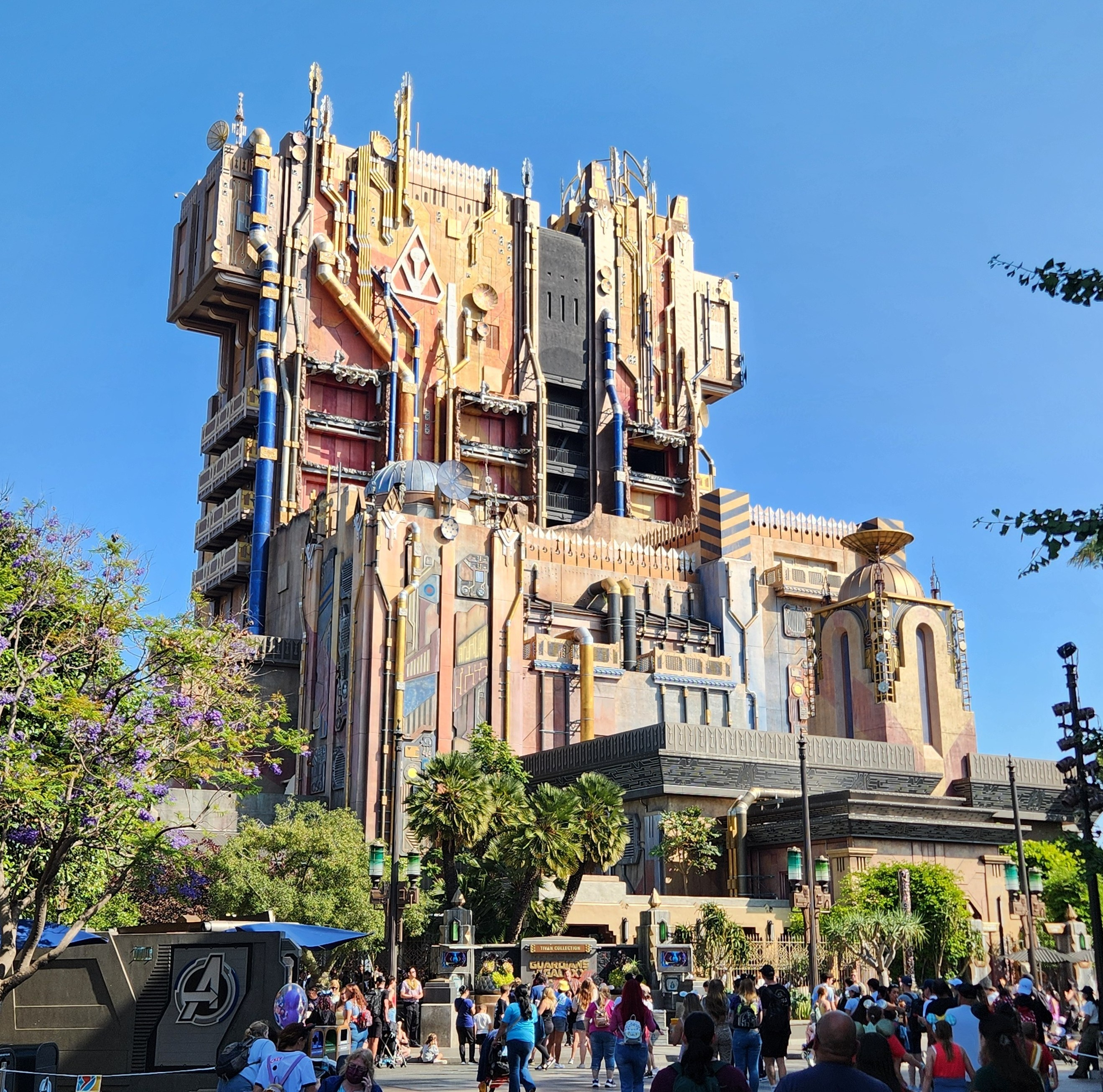
- Attraction facade

Disney California Adventure
- Area: Hollywood Land (2017–2021); Avengers Campus (2021–present)
- Status: Operating
- Soft opening date: May 25, 2017
- Opening date: May 27, 2017
- Replaced: The Twilight Zone Tower of Terror

Ride statistics
- Attraction type: Drop tower, dark ride
- Manufacturer: Otis Elevator Company
- Designer: Walt Disney Imagineering
- Theme: Guardians of the Galaxy
- Music: Score by Tyler Bates: "Hit Me with Your Best Shot" by Pat Benatar; "Give Up the Funk" by Parliament; "Born to Be Wild" by Steppenwolf; "I Want You Back" by the Jackson 5; "Free Ride" by the Edgar Winter Group; "Burning Love" by Elvis Presley
- Height: 183 ft (56 m)
- Drop: 130 ft (40 m)
- Speed: 34 mph (55 km/h)
- Vehicle type: Elevator
- Riders per vehicle: 21
- Rows: 3
- Riders per row: 7
- Duration: 2:10
- Height restriction: 40 in (102 cm)
- Pre-show host: Rocket
- Lightning Lane Available
- Must transfer from wheelchair

Guardians of the Galaxy – Mission: Breakout! is an accelerated drop tower dark ride attraction at Disney California Adventure at Disneyland Resort. Based on the namesake group from the Marvel Cinematic Universe (MCU), it depicts Rocket recruiting guests to attempt to free the remaining Guardians of the Galaxy from display within the Collector's fortress.

The attraction uses the same infrastructure and ride system as the previous attraction, The Twilight Zone Tower of Terror. It features several actors of the cast from the Marvel Studios film series reprising their characters. While the attraction is inspired by the MCU, it is set in a separate shared universe along with the other Avengers Campus attractions.

It opened on May 27, 2017, to coincide with the release of Guardians of the Galaxy Vol. 2.

== Development ==
Announced at the 2016 San Diego Comic-Con, the attraction replaced The Twilight Zone Tower of Terror, which closed on January 3, 2017 at Disney California Adventure. It is the first Disney attraction based on the Marvel Comics characters in the United States, and was incorporated into the adjacent Avengers Campus which opened at the park on June 4, 2021. It was then surrounded by a layer of markings on the ground that imply a cosmic energy which resulted when the fortress was transported from across the galaxy to the campus. The markings are inspired by the Kirby Krackle, based on the artwork of Marvel Comics artist Jack Kirby.

Chris Pratt, Zoe Saldaña, Dave Bautista, Benicio del Toro, and Bradley Cooper reprise their roles as Peter Quill/Star-Lord, Gamora, Drax, Taneleer Tivan/The Collector, and the voice of Rocket, respectively. Vin Diesel did not reprise his role of Groot, and was replaced by voice actor Fred Tatasciore. James Gunn directed all of the scenes involving the cast.

== Attraction ==
The attraction is themed to the Collector's fortress-esque collection called the Tivan Collection, as seen in the 2014 film Guardians of the Galaxy. The Collector (Taneleer Tivan) is showing off his latest acquisitions, the Guardians of the Galaxy, in customized display cases. However, Rocket has secretly escaped his case and asks the guests for help. Guests then board a gantry lift, where they help Rocket try to free the other Guardians.

=== Queue and preshow ===
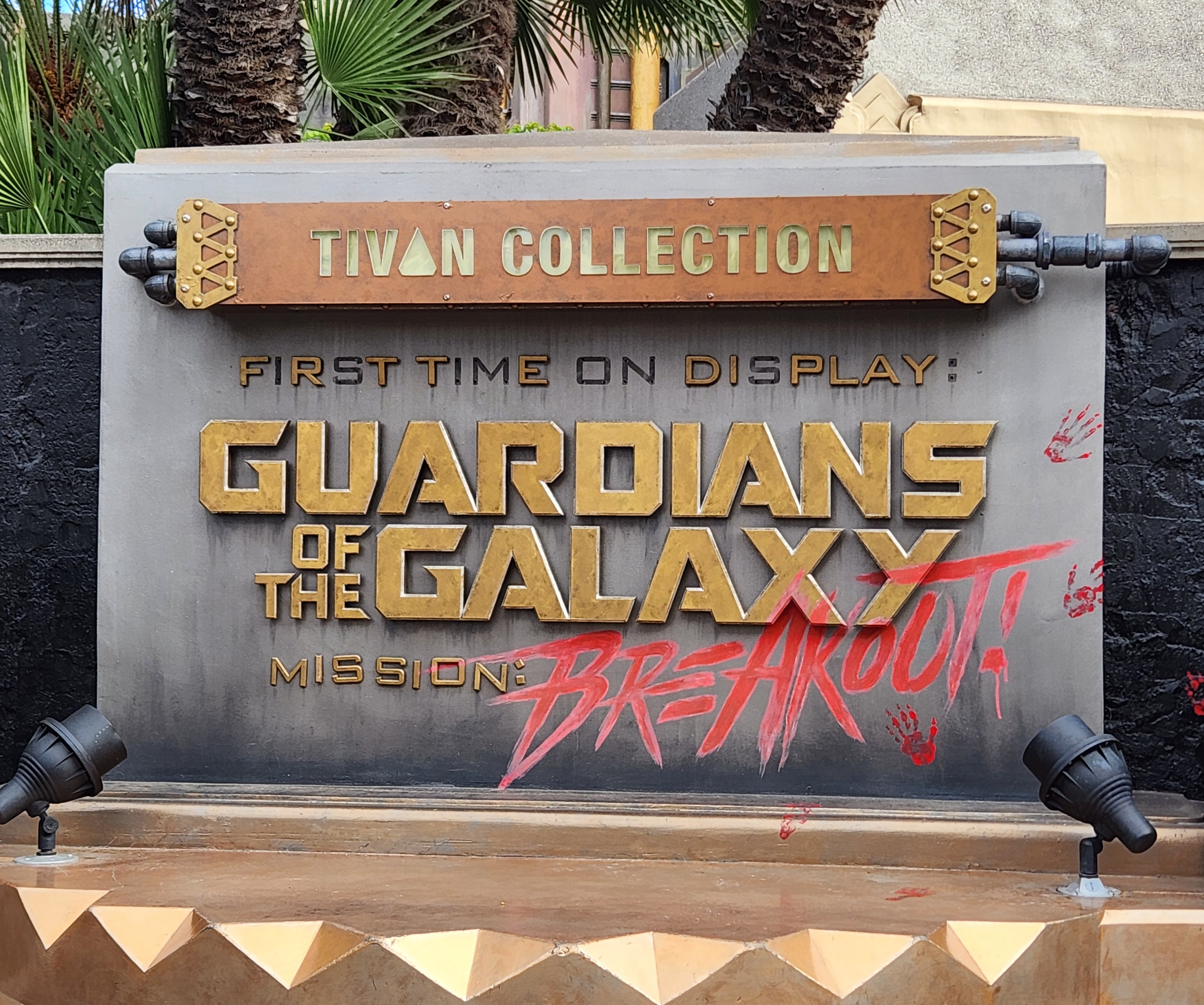
Attraction sign

Guests first pass through the gates and begin in the outdoor queue area. There are extended queue areas on both sides of the path. After passing a gold statue of the Collector, guests enter the main floor of the Collector's archive. The main floor houses a number of artifacts and creatures, including Cosmo the Spacedog. A video plays on loop of the Collector and his assistant Apheta. The video shows off some of the artifacts and lifeforms in the collection, including Stan Lee. The video also reveals the newest addition to the Tivan Collection, the Guardians of the Galaxy. It is revealed through the Guardians' banter that they, specifically Peter Quill, were tricked into coming to visit as they thought they too were going to be given a tour of the facility. The Collector has their glass cases electrified and suspended over an abyss so that the team cannot escape, yet Rocket is still determined to get out. The Collector reveals to the guests that they can access the facility once their biological signs are scanned into the system and then all they have to do is raise their hands for clearance.

Afterwards, the guests are led into the Collector's office, where another video of himself begins playing. Suddenly Rocket, who had escaped his case, enters the room (portrayed through Audio-Animatronics) through a vent and hijacks the video to explain his plan for rescuing his friends. The guests will use their access passes (their hand scan) for access in the lift while Rocket rides on top, taking control of it and taking them to the control room to blow up the generator and cut off all power in the facility, which will open all of the cages so that the Guardians can escape. The Guardians will then reunite with Mantis who will arrive with their ship so that they can make a quick getaway. On his way out of the Collector's office, Rocket grabs Quill's walkman. In the event that the animatronic is non-functional, a CGI version of Rocket already in possession of Quill's walkman will appear on the video screen to hijack the Collector's spiel.

=== Ride experience ===
Mission Breakout has three "gantry lifts", two boarding levels and one shaftway, allowing guests to board one lift while the shaft is in use by the other. Both gantry lifts are pushed into and pulled out of the shaftway by a mechanical arm in front of the exit doors.

After guests are seated in the gantry lift, the Collector tells the riders that "this is the moment you've been waiting for." However, Rocket unplugs the system and inserts Quill's walkman, cued up to one of six songs from the '70s and '80s. The lift quickly rises up to the generator control room where Rocket blows it up, opening the cages and freeing the team, but also cutting the power to the gantry lift. Rocket tries to regain control as the lift accelerates up and down, and guests see the Guardians entangled in various situations, as well as getting a brief view of Disneyland. As soon as the on-ride camera takes photos of the riders, the lift begins to drop once again. Rocket finally restores power and the lift drops down to show the Guardians with Cosmo as Rocket rejoins them and gives Quill his walkman back. They then reunite with Mantis who has arrived with their ship. Quill and Gamora thank the guests for their help, but as the lift resets itself, Drax is heard asking why they are thanking them as all the guests did was sit through the whole experience and did not actually do any fighting.

As guests leave the gantry lift and exit down a corridor, the sounds of the escaping creatures can be heard. The Collector can be heard over the intercom, upset over the loss of the Guardians and his creatures. At one point, Stan Lee can be heard over the intercom asking if this is part of the tour. Howard the Duck can also occasionally be heard, mocking the Collector's situation and making comments to guests.

=== Music and drop sequences ===
Tyler Bates, composer of the Guardians of the Galaxy films, wrote the incidental music for the attraction's queue. There are six different drop sequences of the ride, each synced to its own visuals and songs, some of which were suggested by James Gunn, director of the Guardians of the Galaxy films.

- "I Want You Back" by The Jackson 5: The first scenario is of the Guardians jumping from their confinement, only for Drax to get captured by a tentacled monster. The second scenario shows Quill kicking an Orloni (a rat-like creature), into the cages before being attacked by a group of them.
- "Hit Me with Your Best Shot" by Pat Benatar: The first scenario shows Peter Quill shooing away the tentacled monster, ending with the both of them and Gamora (who is in the same scenario) running from a fleet of security drones. The next scenario shows a giant, gargoyle-like creature jumping up and roaring at the guests. Drax jumps out of the creature's mouth, punches it on the nose and laughs. He then says to the guests, "You're welcome!"
- "Give Up the Funk" by Parliament: The first scenario has Quill and Gamora in the tentacles of the tentacled monster, with Quill and Gamora asking Rocket for help. The following scenario shows Quill kicking an Orloni (a rat-like creature) into the cages before being attacked by a group of them.
- "Free Ride" by The Edgar Winter Group: The first scenario is of the Guardians shooting at the oncoming attacks before Baby Groot pushes a red button that turns off the artificial gravity. The next scenario, respectively, shows everything floating while Quill tells Baby Groot to press the button that puts on the artificial gravity. He does, but everything in the collection falls, including the Gantry Lift.
- "Burning Love" by Elvis Presley: The first scenario is of the Guardians jumping from their confinement, only for Drax to get captured by the tentacled monster. The second scenario shows the giant, gargoyle-like creature jumping up and roaring at the guests. Drax jumps out of the creature's mouth, punches it on the nose and laughs. He then says to the guests, "You're welcome!"
- "Born to Be Wild" by Steppenwolf: The first scenario has Quill and Gamora in the tentacles of the tentacled monster, with Quill and Gamora shouting at Rocket for help. The following scene, respectively, shows Quill shooing away the monster, ending with the both of them and Gamora (who is in the same scenario) running from a fleet of security drones.

== Cast ==
- Chris Pratt as Peter Quill / Star-Lord
- Zoe Saldaña as Gamora
- Dave Bautista as Drax the Destroyer
- Fred Tatasciore as Groot (voice)
- Bradley Cooper as Rocket (voice)
- Benicio del Toro as Taneleer Tivan / The Collector
- Pom Klementieff as Mantis
- Stan Lee as himself
- Seth Green as Howard the Duck (voice)

== Collector's archive ==
In the indoor portion of the queue, guests can view the many items in the Collector's archive. The artifacts are expected to be in rotation. Various items from Guardians of the Galaxy, the Marvel Universe, and inactive Audio-Animatronics from Disney attractions are present including:

- An Ultron sentry from Avengers: Age of Ultron
- Cosmo the Spacedog
- A Nova Corps uniform
- Adam's cocoon (labeled as "Cocoon of Unknown Origin")
- Warlock's Eye
- Kree weapons and orb (from Agents of S.H.I.E.L.D.)
- Three Vyloos (from Guardians of the Galaxy Vol. 2)
- Terrigen crystals
- Asgardian guard armor
- Brazier of Bom'Galiath
- Crystal of Conquest
- Celestial masks
- A painting featuring the Collector playing a game with his brother, the Grandmaster
- Asgardian War Hammer (Beta Ray Bill's hammer)
- Stormbreaker (from Avengers: Infinity War and Avengers: Endgame)
- Atlantis artifacts
- A book describing the Dark Elves and one of their daggers (from Thor: The Dark World)
- Figment from Epcot's original version of Journey into Imagination

More items are located in the Collector's office including:

- An invoice from X-S Tech, the alien corporation from Magic Kingdom's ExtraTERRORestrial Alien Encounter
- A bellhop hat, a luggage tag (used as a bookmark) and books from The Twilight Zone Tower of Terror
- A jar containing a tentacle from Davy Jones's beard
- Loki's shackles (from Thor: The Dark World)
- Loki's optical torture device (from The Avengers)
- A Hydra soldier's helmet, weapons, and badge
- Golden Apples of Idunn
- Crimson Bands of Cyttorak (from Doctor Strange)
- The animatronic remains of Tom Morrow from Innoventions
- The hollow head of a doll from It's a Small World
- Mickey and Minnie tin toys
- 1955 Disneyland maps
- The Bionic Leg (from Guardians of the Galaxy)
- Peter Quill's Walkman (which Rocket takes before leaving the room)

In addition, in the video message from the Collector there is a maquette of a ghost dog from The Haunted Mansion on the table.

When guests enter the maintenance room before entering the gantry lift more items can be found such as:

- The original abominable snowman from Disneyland's Matterhorn Bobsleds
- A painting from The Twilight Zone Tower of Terror
- Dolores the octopus from Disneyland's Country Bear Vacation Hoedown
- A Kamar-Taj dragon statue

== Monsters After Dark ==
In August 2017, it was announced that the attraction would receive a new experience during Halloween Time at the Disneyland Resort called Guardians of the Galaxy – Monsters After Dark. The experience is offered after sunset each night from early September through October 31. The storyline of Monsters After Dark takes place chronologically after the events of Mission Breakout!; the Guardians have just escaped but accidentally left Groot behind. Rocket returns and has guests distract all of the escaped creatures so he can find and rescue Groot. One of the creatures in Monsters After Dark is Surtur's Fire Dragon, which also appears in Thor: Ragnarok. The experience also features a new song titled "Monsters After Dark" written by Tyler Bates. On October 31, the attraction operated as Monsters After Dark all day. The song was released as a digital single on iTunes on November 2, 2017. It returned for the Halloween season in 2018 and 2019 with no changes.

The ghost of Yondu Udonta (Michael Rooker) briefly appears wandering the hallways of the archive in the pre-show.

== See also ==
- Iron Man Experience
- Ant-Man and The Wasp: Nano Battle!
- Web Slingers: A Spider-Man Adventure
- List of amusement rides based on film franchises
- Guardians of the Galaxy: Cosmic Rewind
