= Avengers Infinity Defense =

Upcoming ride at Disney California Adventure

Disney California Adventure
- Area: Avengers Campus
- Status: Under construction
- Replaced: Backstage Red Car Trolley barn

Ride statistics
- Attraction type: Dark ride
- Designer: Walt Disney Imagineering
- Theme: The Avengers
- Riders per vehicle: 12
- Rows: 3
- Riders per row: 4

Avengers Infinity Defense is an upcoming dark ride themed to the Marvel Cinematic Universe characters the Avengers at Disney California Adventure. It is scheduled to open in 2028.

== Development ==
Plans for an Avengers-themed ride were first announced prior to the opening of Avengers Campus at the D23 Expo in August 2019, for the land's "second phase" where it was described as a ride in which park guests would board a Quinjet and fly along with the Avengers in an adventure to "Wakanda and beyond". Avengers Campus opened at Disney California Adventure in 2021, and at the next D23 Expo in September 2022, it was revealed the ride's concept had been revised; inspired by the multiverse, the attraction was described as guests battling alongside the Avengers and facing enemies from "anywhere and everywhen", including a variant of Thanos called "King Thanos".

At the Destination D23 event in September 2023, a preview was given of the ride's "world-jumping" vehicle. The vehicle was described as combining "elements of Tony Stark's time suits with Xandarian jump points and Wakandan technology". In an Instagram post that same month, Walt Disney Imagineering stated that the attraction will be a blend of "large-scale built environments and immersive media."

At the D23 fan event in August 2024, the attraction's name was revealed to be Avengers Infinity Defense and it was announced that guests will travel alongside various heroes to locations such as Asgard, Wakanda, and New York City as King Thanos wreaks havoc. It was also announced that Robert Downey Jr. would be reprising his role as Tony Stark for the attraction. At South by Southwest in March 2025, it was mentioned that some of the other heroes that will appear are Black Panther, Ant-Man, and Hulk.

At the D23 fan event in August 2026, it was revealed that Iman Vellani, Jeremy Renner, Anthony Mackie, and Chris Hemsworth would be reprising their roles of Ms. Marvel, Hawkeye, Captain America, and Thor respectively, for the attraction. it was also announced that it is scheduled to open in 2028.
