= Stark Flight Lab =

Upcoming flight simulator at Disney California Adventure

Disney California Adventure
- Area: Avengers Campus
- Status: Under construction
- Replaced: Backstage Red Car Trolley barn

Ride statistics
- Attraction type: Flight simulator
- Designer: Walt Disney Imagineering
- Theme: Tony Stark's workshop
- Riders per vehicle: 2

Stark Flight Lab is an upcoming flight simulator themed to the Marvel Cinematic Universe character Tony Stark at Disney California Adventure. It is scheduled to open in 2028.

== Development ==
Stark Flight Lab was first announced during the D23 fan event in August 2024, where it was described as an experience in which park guests will "sit in two-person pods and deploy to a test station" after which a robot arm will pick up the pod and whirl riders around in a simulated flight. It was also announced at the event that Robert Downey Jr. will be reprising his role as Tony Stark for the attraction. At South by Southwest in March 2025, it was mentioned that Walt Disney Imagineering worked with dancers to help choreograph the movement of the robot arms through motion capture.

At the D23 fan event in August 2026, it was revealed that Brie Larson and Anthony Mackie would be reprising their roles of Captain Marvel and Captain America respectively, for the attraction. it was also announced that it is scheduled to open in 2028.
