= Avengers Campus =

Marvel Cinematic Universe themed area at Disney parks

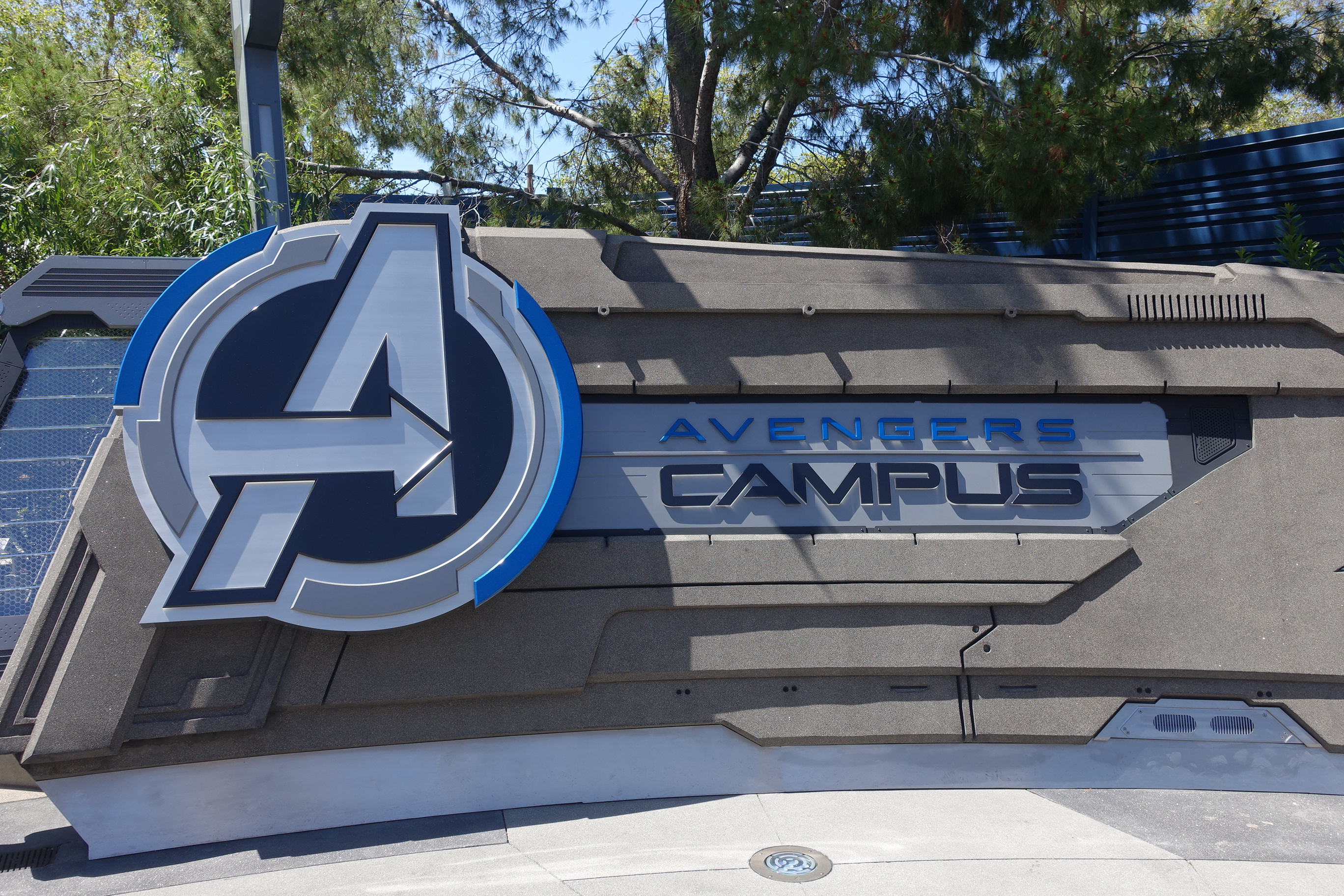
- Land entrance marquee at Disney California Adventure
- Theme: Marvel Cinematic Universe

Attractions
- Total: 6 (As of 2021)

Disney California Adventure
- Coordinates: 33.8121°N 117.9190°W
- Status: Operating
- Opened: June 4, 2021
- Replaced: A Bug's Land

Disney Adventure World (As Marvel Avengers Campus)
- Coordinates: 48.8672°N 2.7838°E
- Status: Operating
- Opened: July 20, 2022
- Replaced: Backlot

Hong Kong Disneyland (As Stark Expo)
- Coordinates: 22.3130°N 114.0413°E
- Status: Under construction
- Opens: 2028
- Replaced: Portion of Tomorrowland

Avengers Campus (Note: "Campus" is a backronym for the Centralized Assembly Mobilized to Prepare, Unite, and Safeguard) is a Marvel Cinematic Universe (MCU)–themed area located at Disney California Adventure and Disney Adventure World, and being developed for Hong Kong Disneyland under the name Stark Expo. The Marvel-themed areas or "lands" are being developed simultaneously at the three parks and inspired by the MCU. However, they instead take place in the "Marvel Theme Park Universe", an alternate universe parallel to Earth-616 within the MCU multiverse, in which the Blip, introduced in Avengers: Infinity War (2018), and subsequent events did not occur. They are designed by Walt Disney Imagineering, in collaboration with Marvel Studios and Marvel Themed Entertainment.

Based on three different continents, the Marvel-themed areas will be defined as the "Super Hero campus" of their specific region, that will help guests to become heroes. Each area will feature mostly different sets of attractions and entertainment, while being strongly interconnected with each other by sharing a common narrative.

== Disney California Adventure ==
Avengers Campus at Disney California Adventure is centered around an Avengers campus located on the former shared grounds of a Stark Industries plant and Strategic Scientific Reserve complex. The area takes up the space previously occupied by A Bug's Land—with Web Slingers: A Spider-Man Adventure using the same show building that previously housed the It's Tough to Be a Bug! attraction—as well as absorbing the nearby Guardians of the Galaxy – Mission: Breakout! attraction which opened in 2017 in the adjacent Hollywood Land.

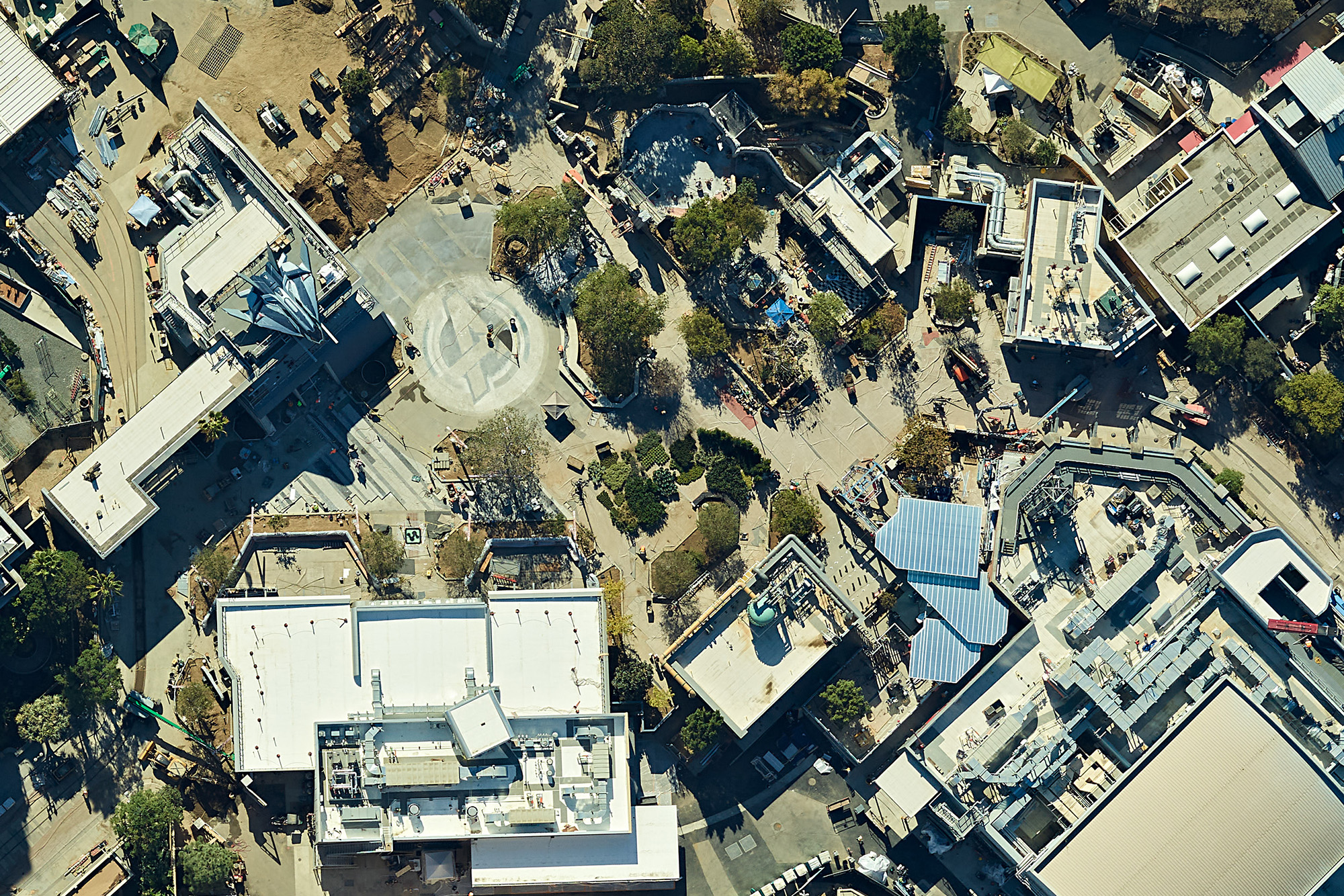
Aerial image of Avengers Campus at Disney California Adventure during advanced construction stage, November 2020.

A Bug's Land closed on September 5, 2018, to make way for the new area. At the 2017 D23 Expo, Disney announced the Guardians of the Galaxy attraction would be joined by Spider-Man and the Avengers as part of the new immersive superhero-themed area at the park. Disney initially announced on March 11, 2020, that Avengers Campus would open on July 18, 2020, but was delayed due to the theme parks being shut down caused by the COVID-19 pandemic and two stay at home orders issued by California Governor Gavin Newsom. In late December 2020, Disney announced that Avengers Campus was scheduled to open in 2021. Due to a 1994 contract with Universal Parks & Resorts, Disney cannot use the "Marvel" name in the park's branding or attractions. In April 2021, Disney announced that the area would open on June 4, 2021.

On February 28, 2022, to honor Stan Lee, the park dedicated a plaque by an entrance to the Campus surrounded by blue planters as Lee would have celebrated his 100th Birthday in December 2022. The plaque's inscription reads: "We dedicate Avengers Campus to the incomparable Stan Lee. 'That person who helps others simply because it should or must be done and because it's the right thing to do, is indeed without a doubt a real superhero.' Thank you, Stan, for inspiring the hero within each of us. You have made us all True Believers." A similar plaque was erected August 2026 in honor of Jack Kirby, reading "The characters you created populate this campus as a living tribute to you, Jack". In September 2022, at the D23 Expo, it was announced that an Avengers multiverse ride was in development featuring a version of Thanos called "King Thanos".

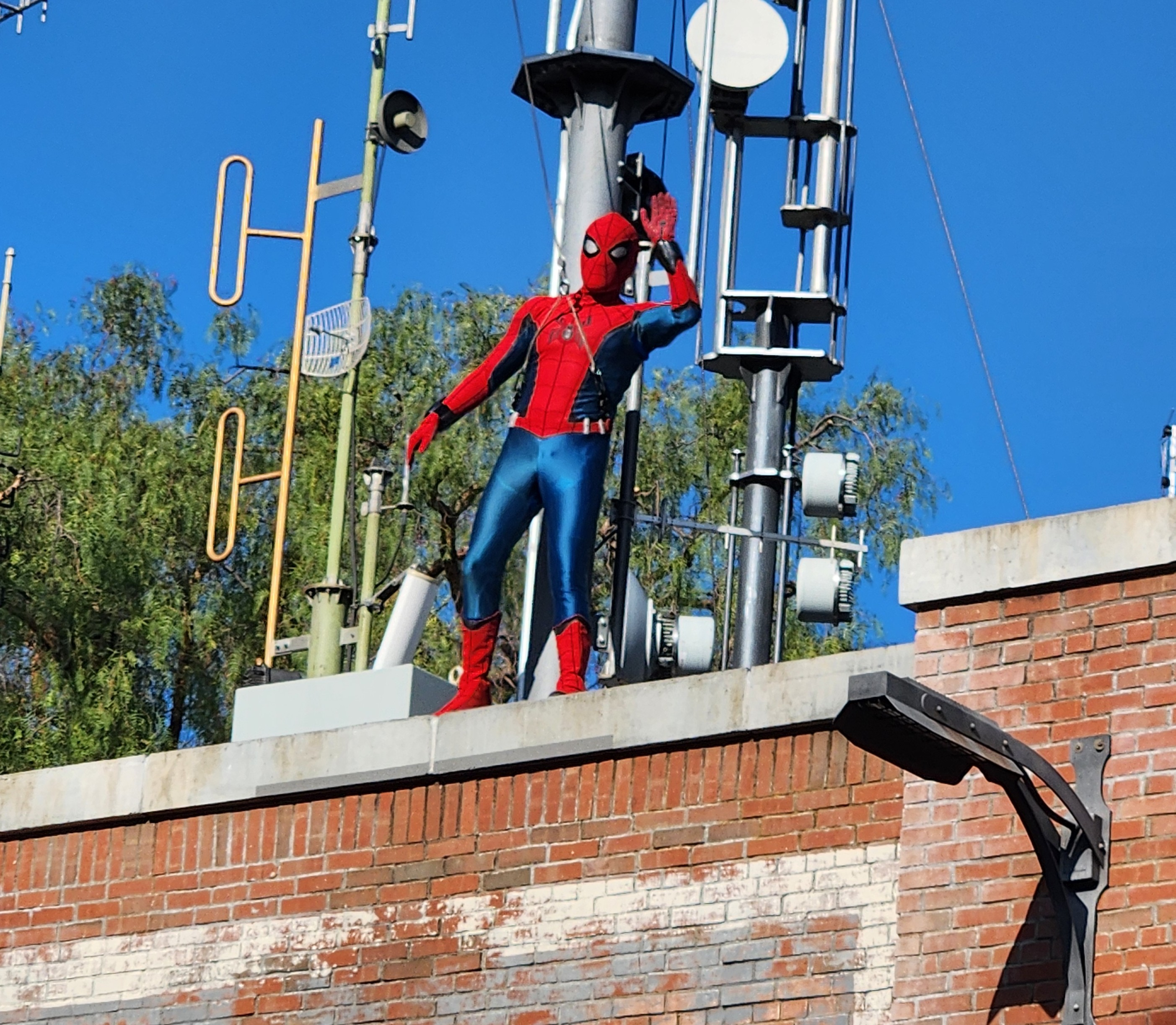
Spider-Man on top of the Web Slingers: A Spider-Man Adventure building

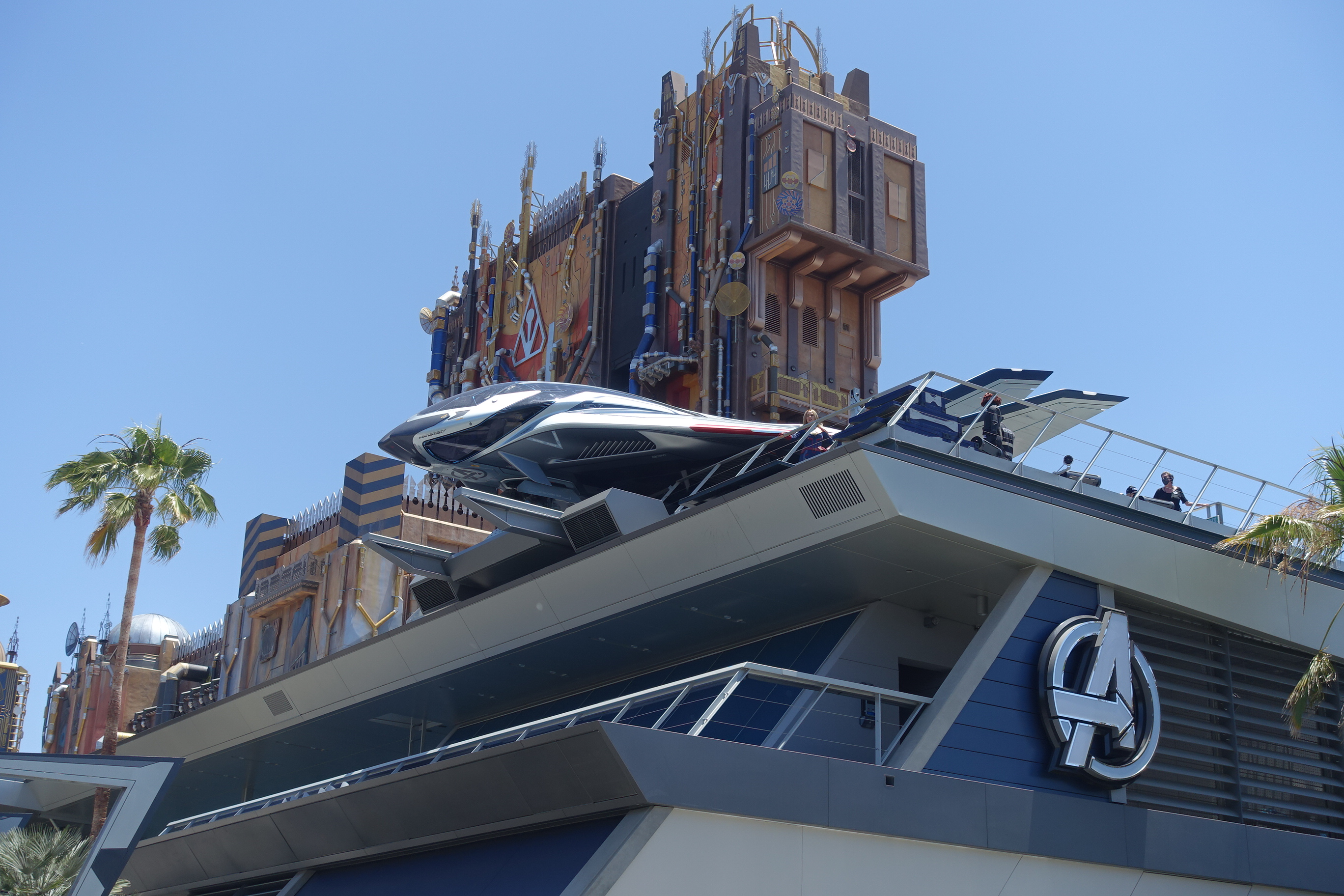
Avengers Headquarters with Guardians of the Galaxy – Mission: Breakout! behind it, pictured in 2021

In early June 2024, Disneyland announced that the Doctor Strange: Mysteries of the Mystic Arts show would have its final performance by June 30, 2024. Although Doctor Strange continues to make appearances in Avengers Campus. In July 2024, it was announced that Deadpool would appear at Avengers Campus for a limited time, marking the first time that Disney Parks have featured a live character experience from an R-rated film. The character also joined the Avengers Campus's shows such as Guardians of the Galaxy – Awesome Dance Off! and Avengers Assemble!, while themed food was added to Pym Test Kitchen. At the D23 fan event in August 2024 the Avengers multiverse ride was revealed to be called Avengers Infinity Defense, while a new attraction, Stark Flight Lab, was announced. Additionally, Robert Downey Jr. will reprise his role as Tony Stark for both Avengers Infinity Defense and Stark Flight Lab. Construction on these attractions began in 2025.

=== Current attractions and entertainment ===
- Guardians of the Galaxy – Mission: Breakout!
  - Guardians of the Galaxy – Monsters After Dark (seasonal)
- Guardians of the Galaxy – Awesome Dance Off!
- Heroic Encounters
- Web Slingers: A Spider-Man Adventure
- Avengers Headquarters

=== Future attractions, entertainment and retails ===
- Avengers Infinity Defense (opening in 2028)
- Stark Flight Lab (opening in 2028)

=== Former attractions and entertainment ===
- Doctor Strange: Mysteries of the Mystic Arts (2021–2024)

=== Restaurants ===
- Pym Test Kitchen
- Pym Tasting Lab
- Shawarma Palace
- Terran Treats

=== Retail ===
- The Collector's Warehouse
- WEB Suppliers
- Campus Supply Pod
- Avengers Vault
Avengers Campus attractions

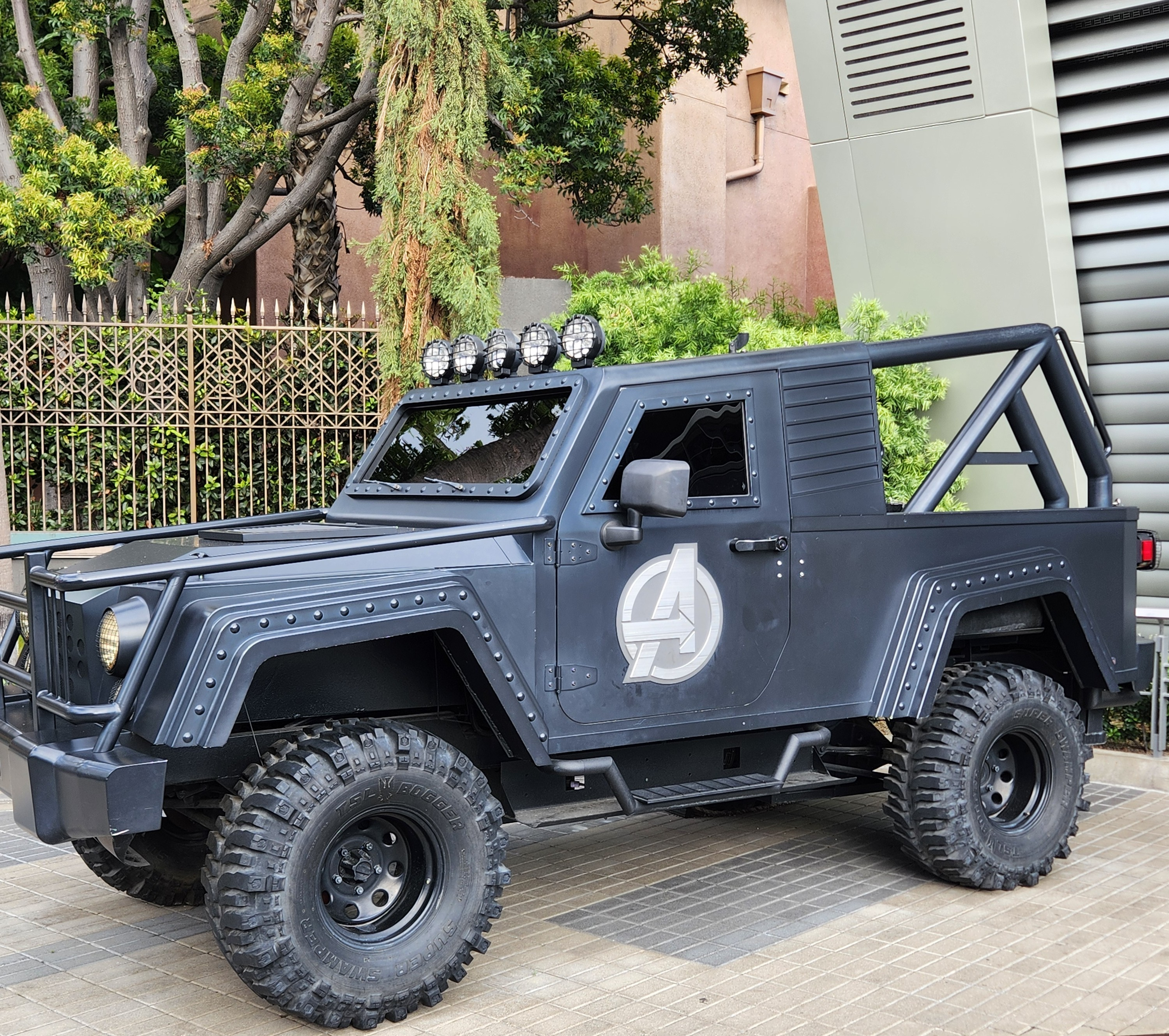
Avengers jeep

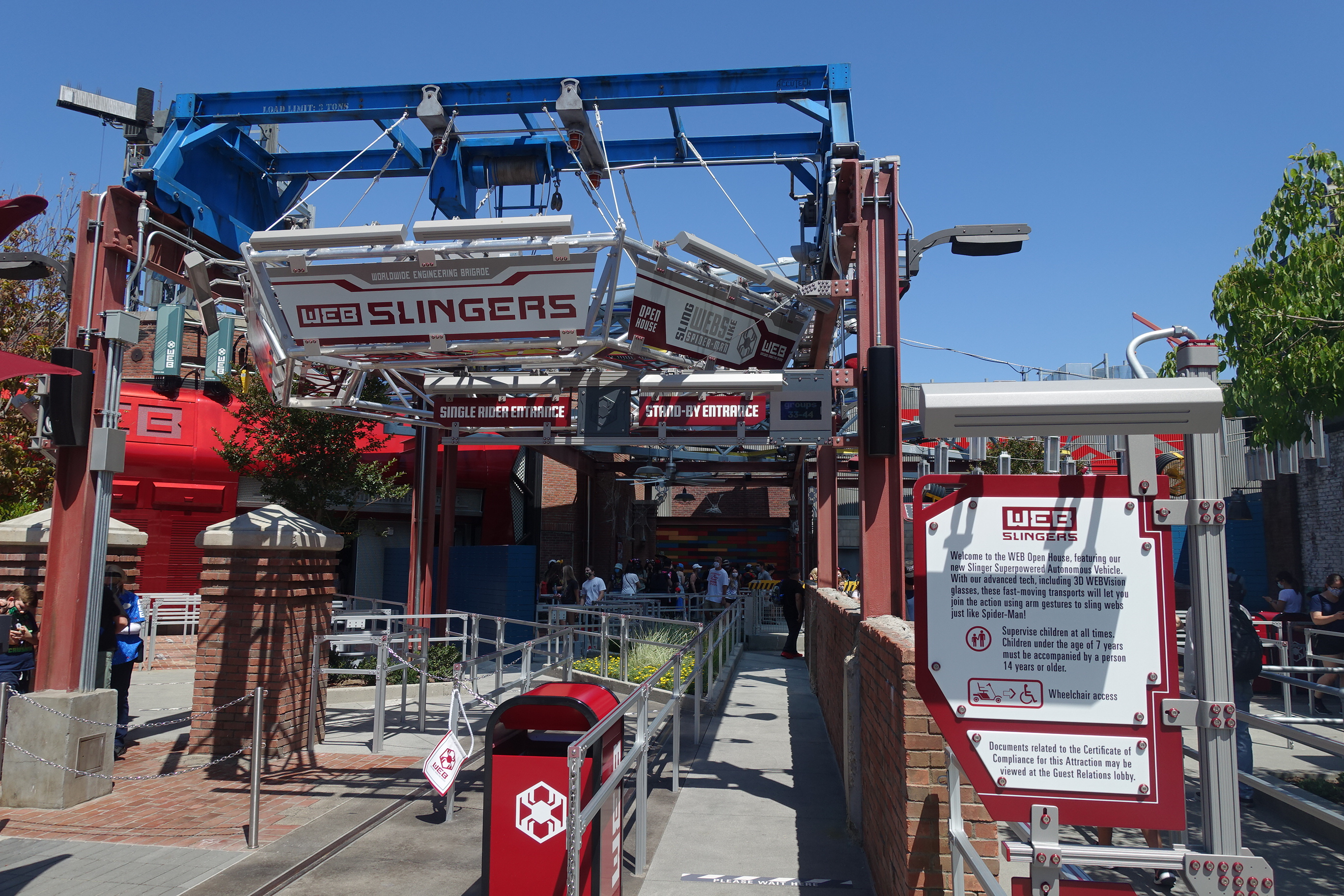
Web Slingers: A Spider-Man Adventure

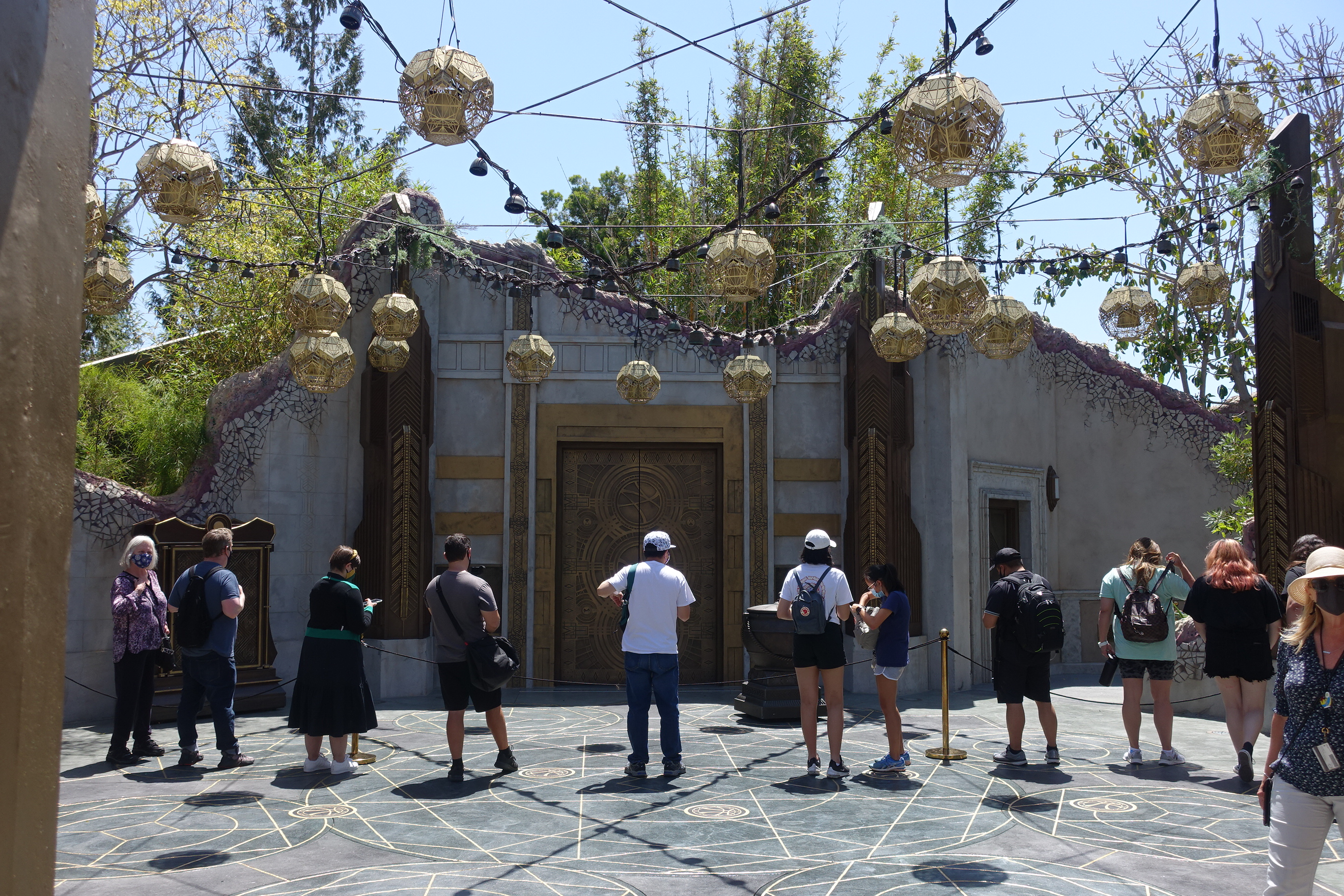
Ancient Sanctum

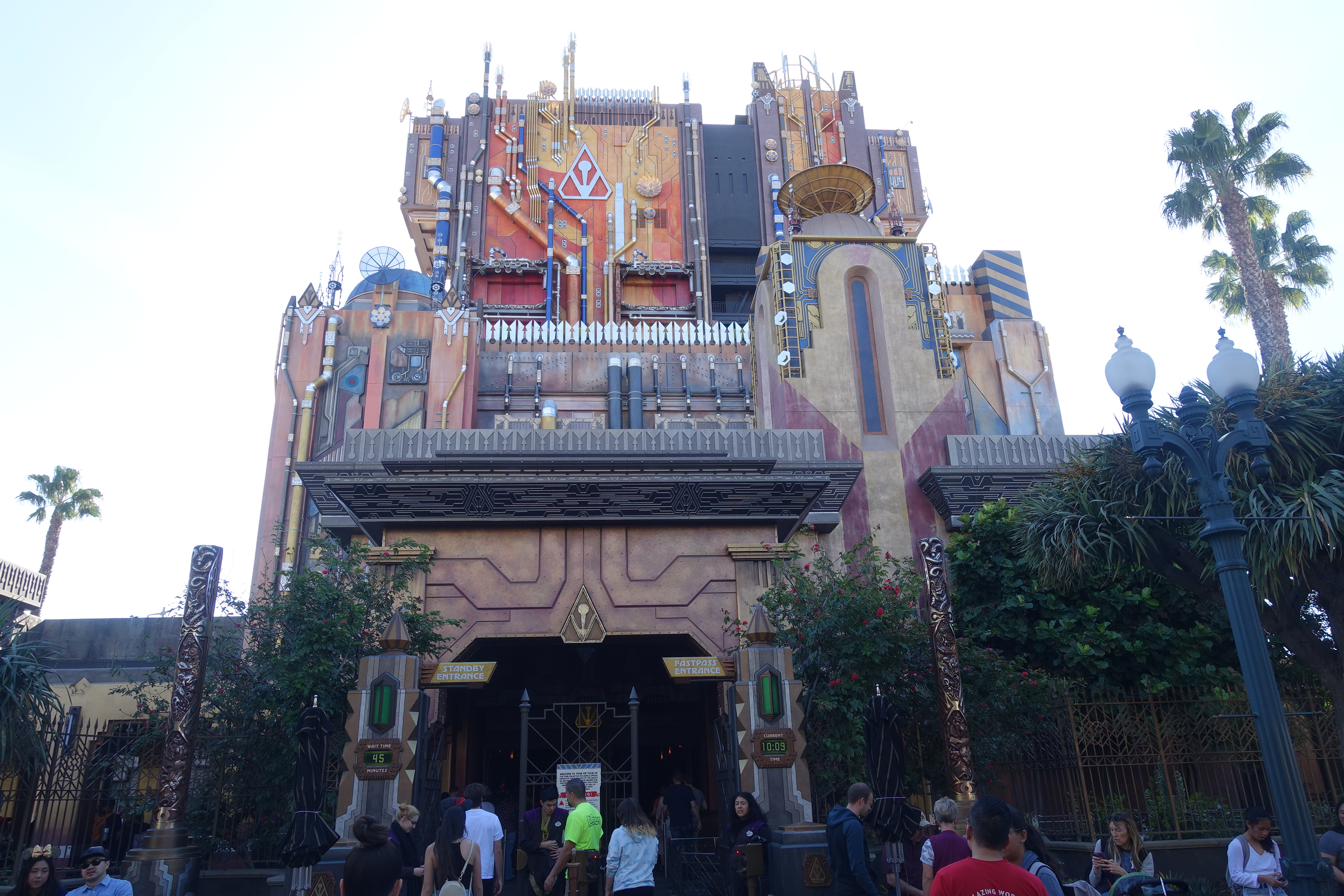
Guardians of the Galaxy – Mission: Breakout!

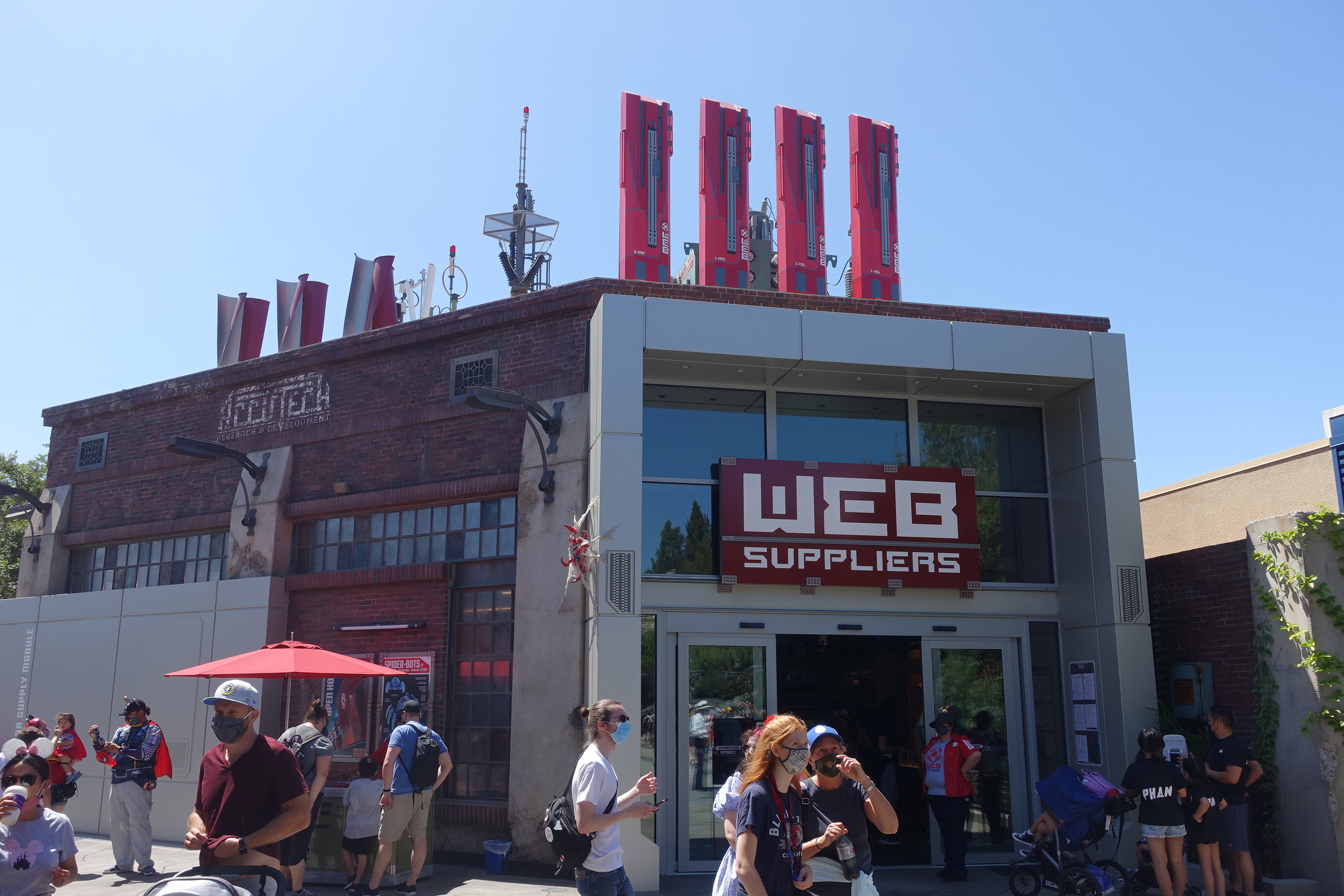
WEB Suppliers

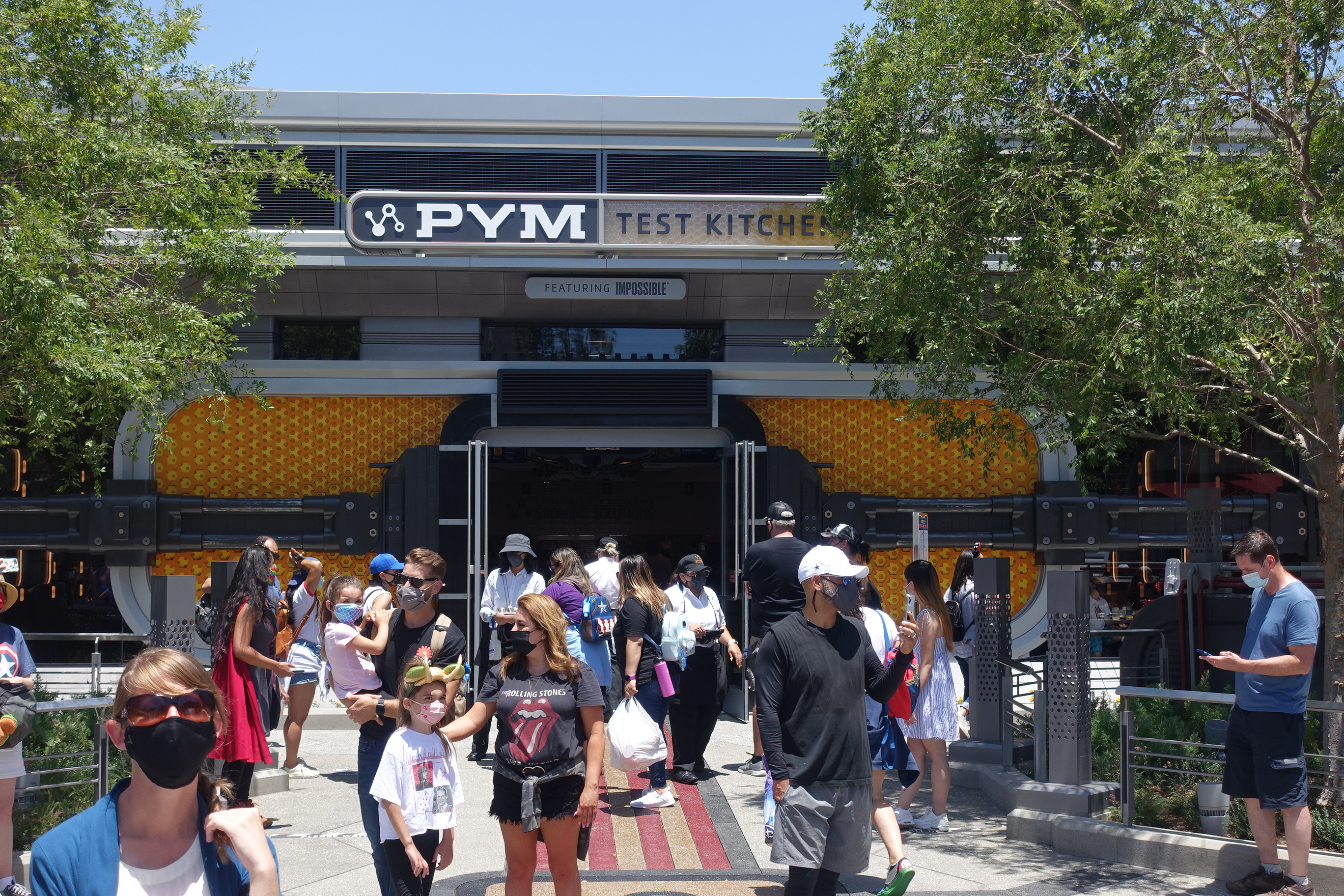
Pym Test Kitchen

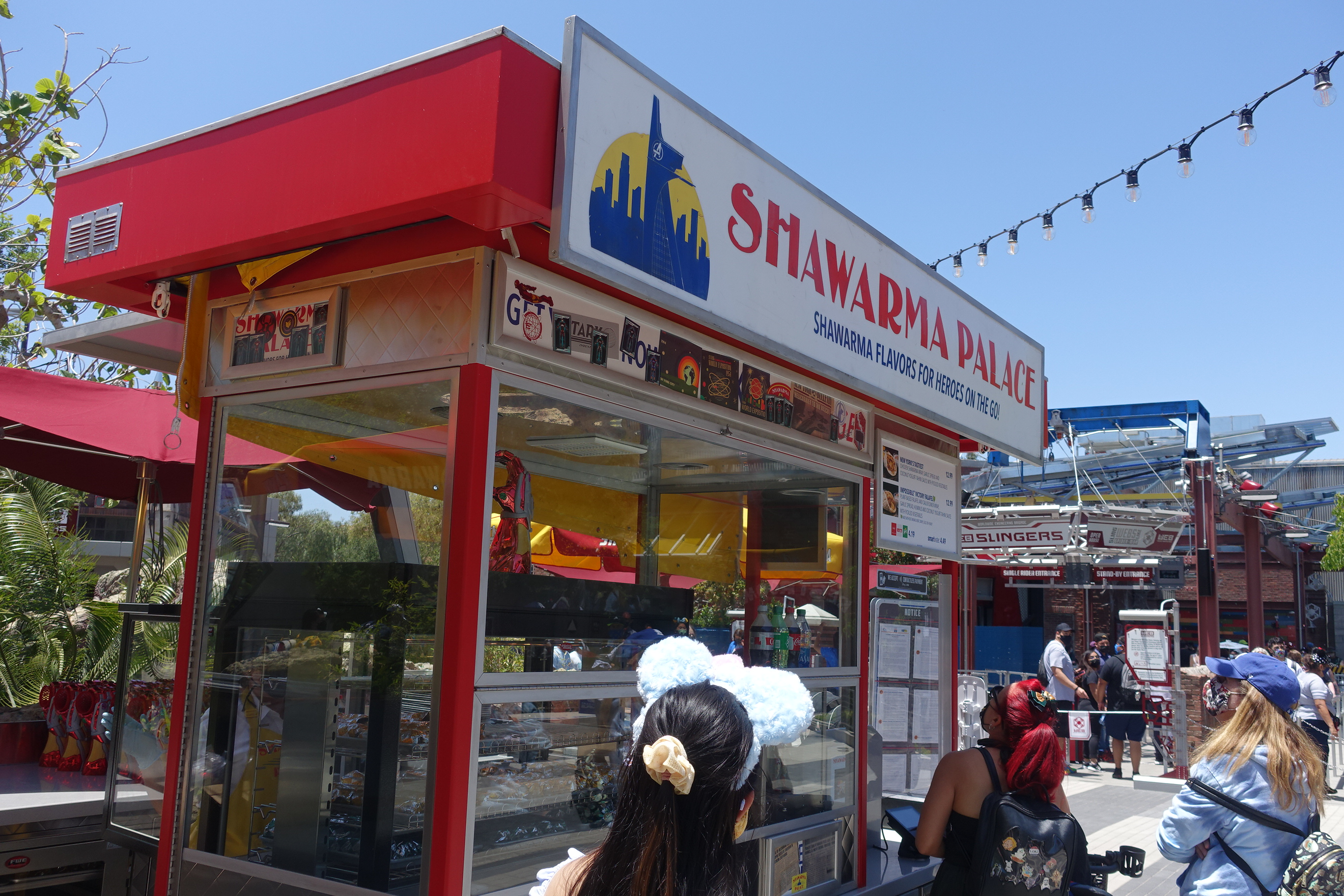
Shawarma Palace

=== Meet and greet characters ===
The following is a list of characters who have been available for meet and greets or have made appearances at Avengers Campus. Many character appearances are timed with the release of their associated Marvel Studios film or television project.

- Bruce Banner / Hulk / Smart Hulk
- Clint Barton / Hawkeye
- Kate Bishop / Hawkeye
- Elsa Bloodstone
- America Chavez
- Carol Danvers / Captain Marvel
- Death Dealer
- Dora Milaje
- Jane Foster / Mighty Thor
- Nick Fury
- Gamora
- Groot
- Ben Grimm / The Thing (Note: Ahead of the Fantastic Four and H.E.R.B.I.E.'s appearance at Avengers Campus in November 2026, they appeared in Disneyland's Tomorrowland in July 2025 to mark the release of The Fantastic Four: First Steps. Additionally, Ben Grimm / The Thing and Sue Storm / Invisible Woman made appearances at Hong Kong Disneyland's Tomorrowland, while Ben Grimm / The Thing also made an appearance at Disney Adventure World's Avengers Campus.)
- Agatha Harkness
- H.E.R.B.I.E.
- Kang the Conqueror
- Kamala Khan / Ms. Marvel
- Kingo
- Cassie Lang
- Scott Lang / Ant-Man
- Logan / Wolverine
- Loki
- Mantis
- Wanda Maximoff / Scarlet Witch
- M'Baku
- Okoye
- Ouroboros "O. B."
- Peter Parker / Spider-Man
- Phastos
- Peter Quill / Star-Lord
- Monica Rambeau
- Reed Richards / Mister Fantastic
- Steve Rogers / Captain America
- Natasha Romanoff / Black Widow
- Jack Russell / Werewolf by Night
- Sersi
- Shang-Chi
- Alexei Shostakov / Red Guardian
- Shuri / Black Panther
- Marc Spector / Moon Knight
  - Steven Grant / Mr. Knight
- Tony Stark / Iron Man
- Dr. Stephen Strange
- Johnny Storm / Human Torch
- Sue Storm / Invisible Woman
- T'Challa / Black Panther
- Thor
- Hope van Dyne / Wasp
- Sam Wilson / Captain America
- Wade Wilson / Deadpool

=== Related ===
A number of additional Marvel-related shows and character interactions have appeared in the adjacent Hollywood Land area. These include:

- Rogers: The Musical – one-act production of the fictional musical, performed at the Hyperion Theater from June to August 2023.
- Characters from the Disney Television Animation Marvel series Moon Girl and Devil Dinosaur appeared in February 2023, in honor of Black History Month.
- Story Time with Deadpool – a limited-time show that premiered in July 2024, in which Deadpool and Wolverine recount "family friendly tales". A holiday-themed version of the show returned from mid-November 2025 until early January 2026.

== Disney Adventure World ==
The version at Disney Adventure World in Disneyland Paris is known as Marvel Avengers Campus, and exists on the former Backlot area of the park, where Armageddon – Les Effets Speciaux stood until 2019. It includes Avengers Assemble: Flight Force (a re-theme of the park's opening day attraction Rock 'n' Roller Coaster Starring Aerosmith that features Tony Stark and Carol Danvers) and Web Slingers: A Spider-Man Adventure from California, now titled as Spider-Man W.E.B. Adventure. The area opened on July 20, 2022.

On September 30, 2024, a new nighttime spectacular show was announced, Doctor Strange: Mystery of the Mystics. It ran from November 23, 2024 to March 29, 2025. On October 25, 2025, it was announced that the shows would return until November 29, 2025.

To promote the theatrical release of Captain America: Brave New World, a one-time nighttime drone show with fireworks and projections was hosted in February 2025.

=== Attractions and entertainment ===
- Avengers Assemble: Flight Force
- Spider-Man W.E.B. Adventure
- Training Center
- Heroic Encounters
- Doctor Strange: Mystery of the Mystics (2024–present)

In the Training Center, guests can meet Spider-Man, Iron Man, or other Marvel characters. The experience features a dynamic "freeze frame" video sequence, created with Disney Photo Pass through 27 cameras placed around the area.

=== Dining ===
- Pym Kitchen
- Stark Factory
- Super Diner
- WEB – Worldwide Eating Brigade
- FANtastic Food Truck

=== Retail ===
- Mission Equipment

== Hong Kong Disneyland ==
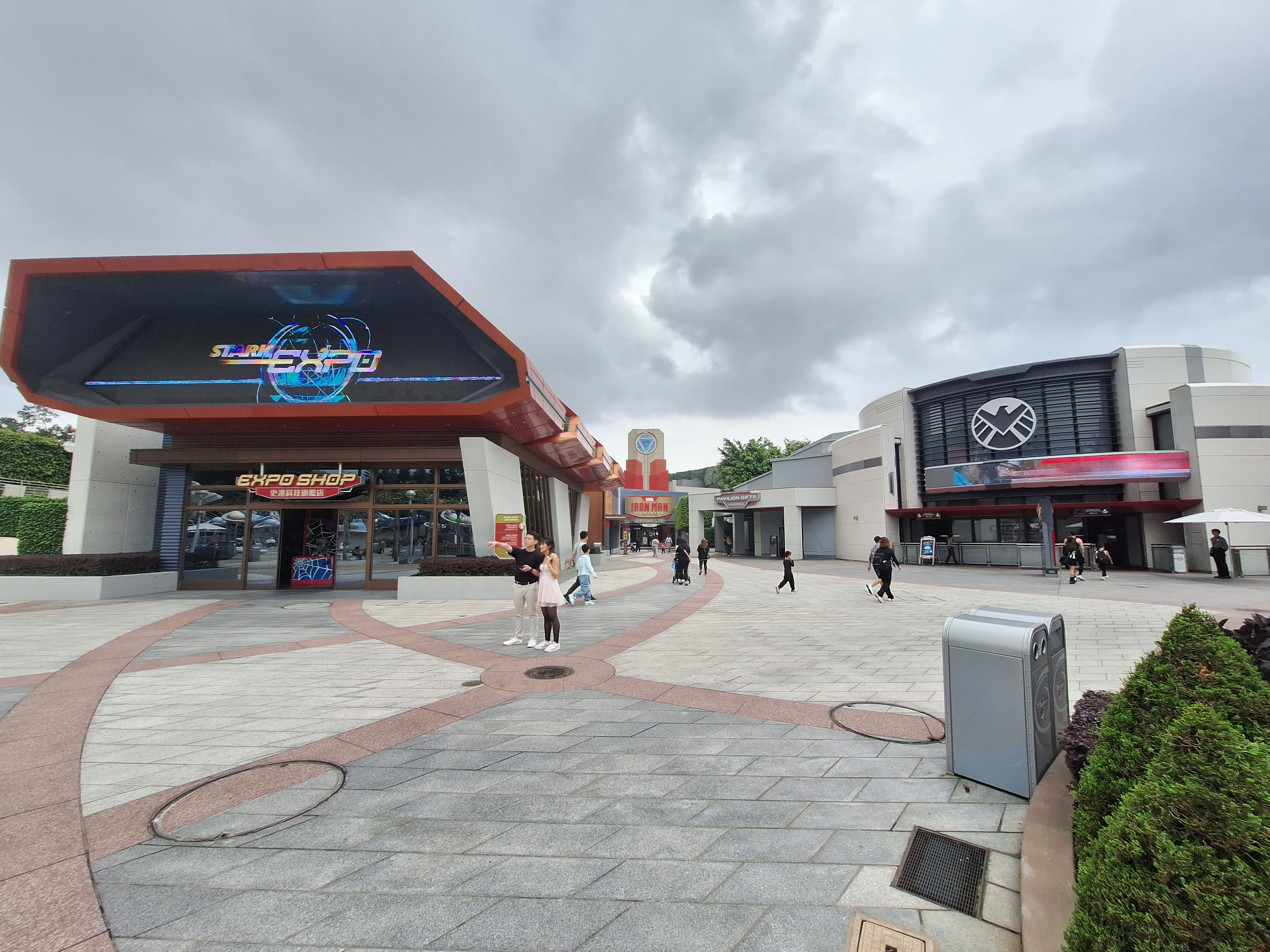
Hong Kong Stark Expo Venue (Iron Man Experience) and S.H.I.E.L.D. Science and Technology Pavilion (Ant-Man and The Wasp: Nano Battle!), pictured in 2024

The version at Hong Kong Disneyland was announced in 2016, as part of the park's expansion plan. It will take over part of Tomorrowland and will be rethemed as the Marvel theme Stark Expo based in Hong Kong. This version entered phase 2 in 2019, which includes Ant-Man and The Wasp: Nano Battle! in the Science and Technology Pavilion of Stark Expo, which was originally set to taking over the area previously occupied by Buzz Lightyear Astro Blasters. Along with a new retail facility and themed food. In addition, there will be new attractions and live entertainment added to the land up until 2027, when a brand new Avengers themed ride will open, which was originally set to taking over the area previously occupied by Autopia.

During HKDL's 20th anniversary activities, a Avengers attraction was announced. Once Stark Expo is completed, Marvel-themed land eventually include three rides and live entertainment. In January 2026, it was announced that Tomorrowland Stage in the portion of Tomorrowland was being closed to make way for a new Avengers ride and became part of the section of Stark Expo.

=== Current attractions and entertainment (as part of Tomorrowland) ===
- Iron Man Experience
  - Iron Man Tech Showcase
- Ant-Man and The Wasp: Nano Battle!
  - Expo Assembly Station – Heroic Encounter

=== Current dining (as part of Tomorrowland) ===
- Starliner Diner

=== Current retail (as part of Tomorrowland) ===
- Expo Shop
- Pavilion Gifts

=== Future attractions and entertainment ===
- Untitled Avengers attraction

=== Future dining ===
- Untitled Avengers quick-service dining

=== Future retail ===
- Untitled Avengers shop
Hong Kong Stark Expo attractions

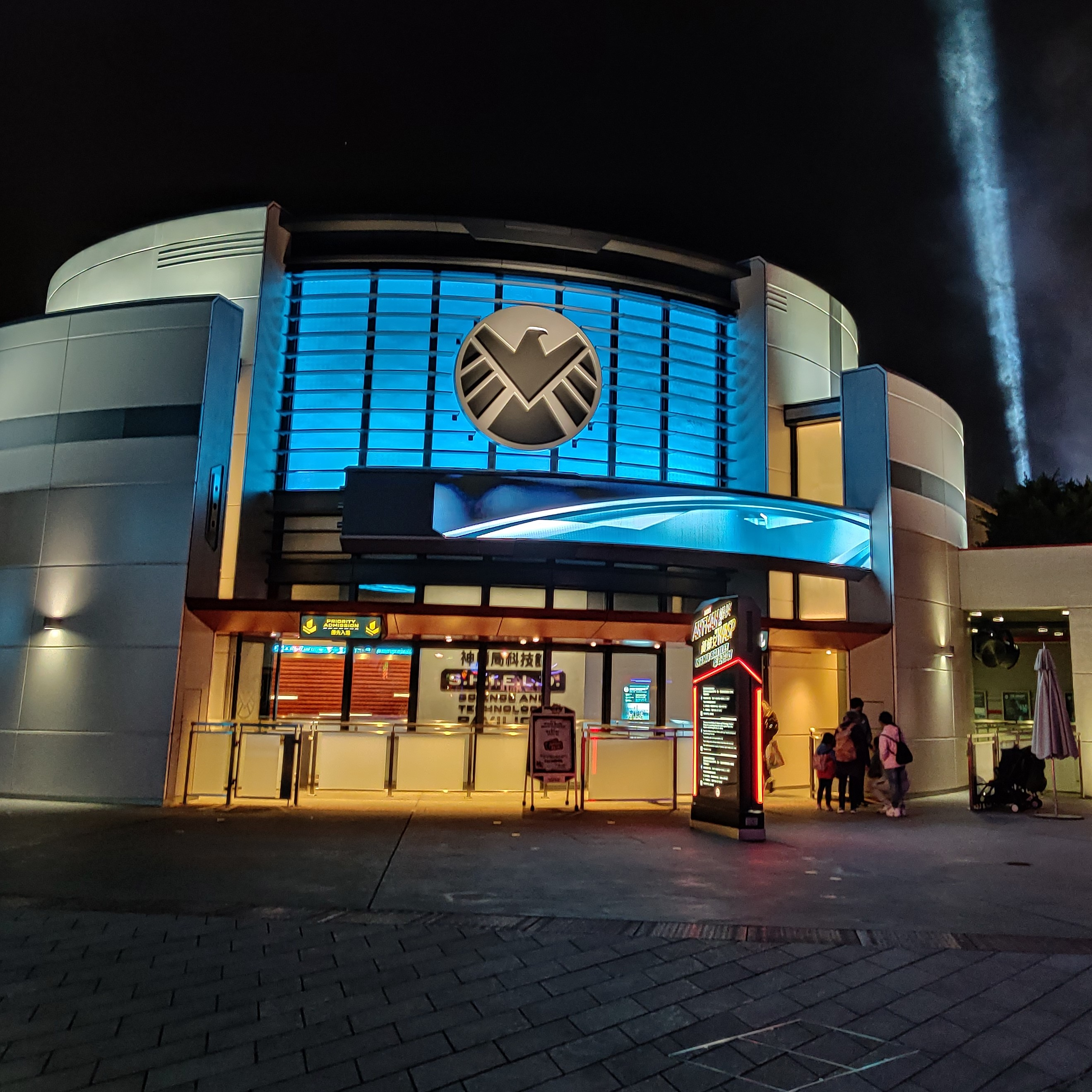
Ant-Man and The Wasp: Nano Battle!

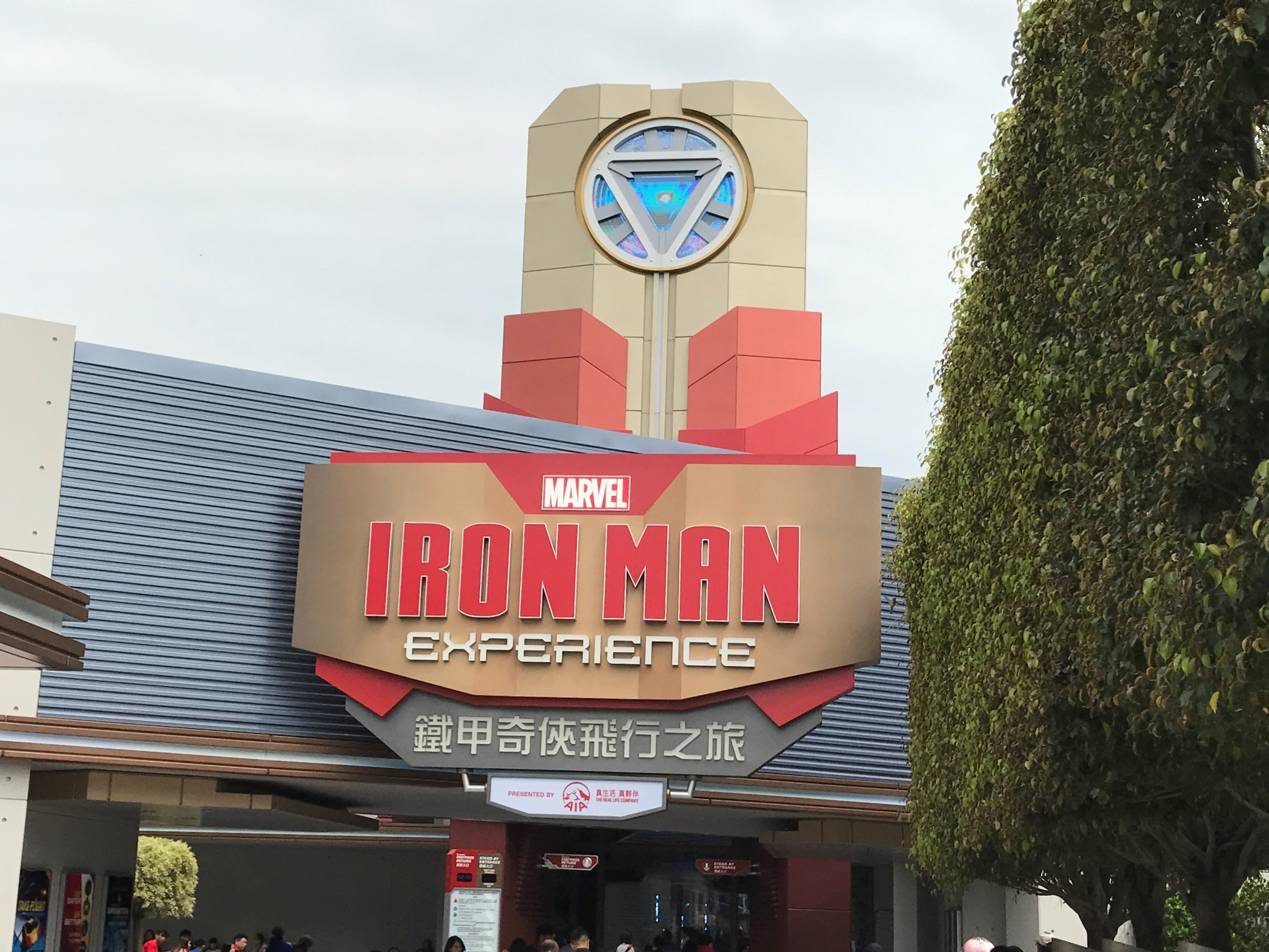
Iron Man Experience

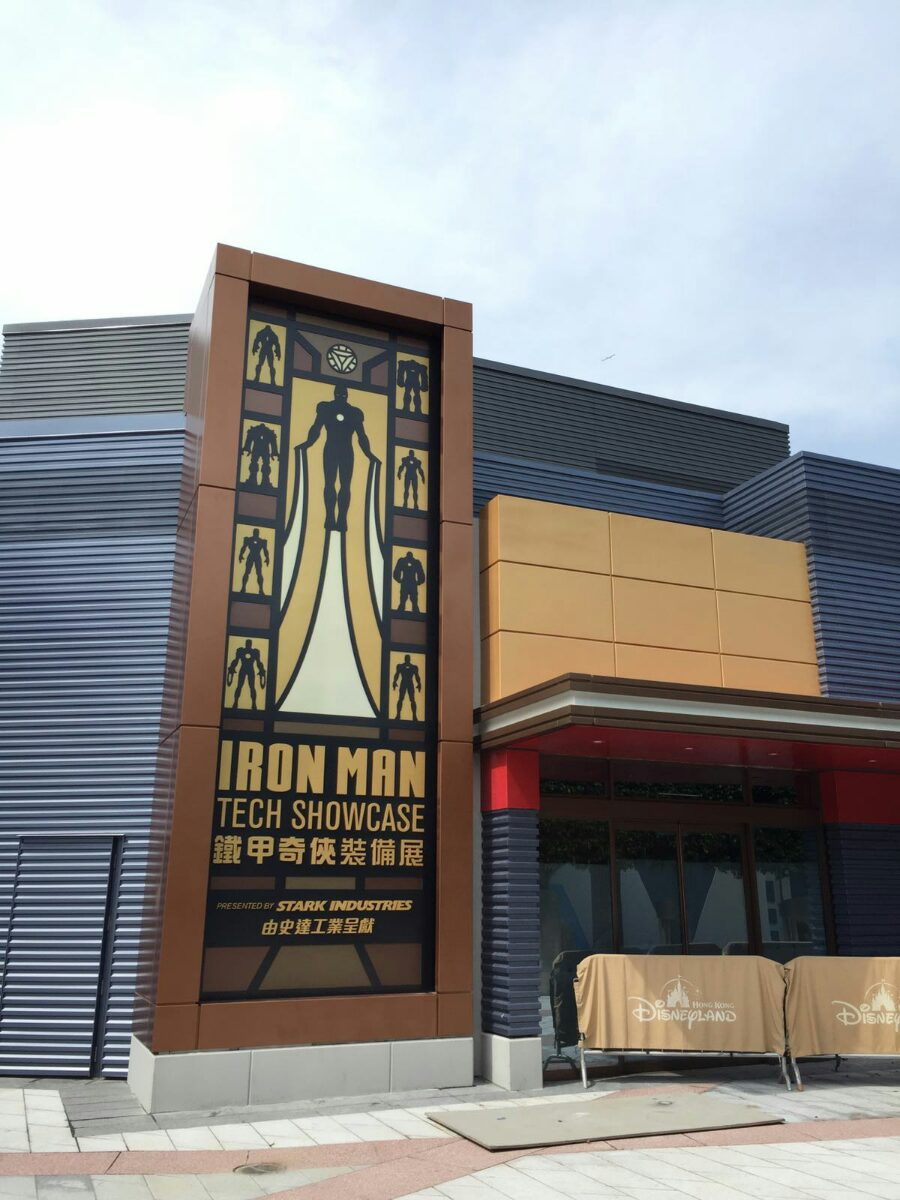
Iron Man Tech Showcase

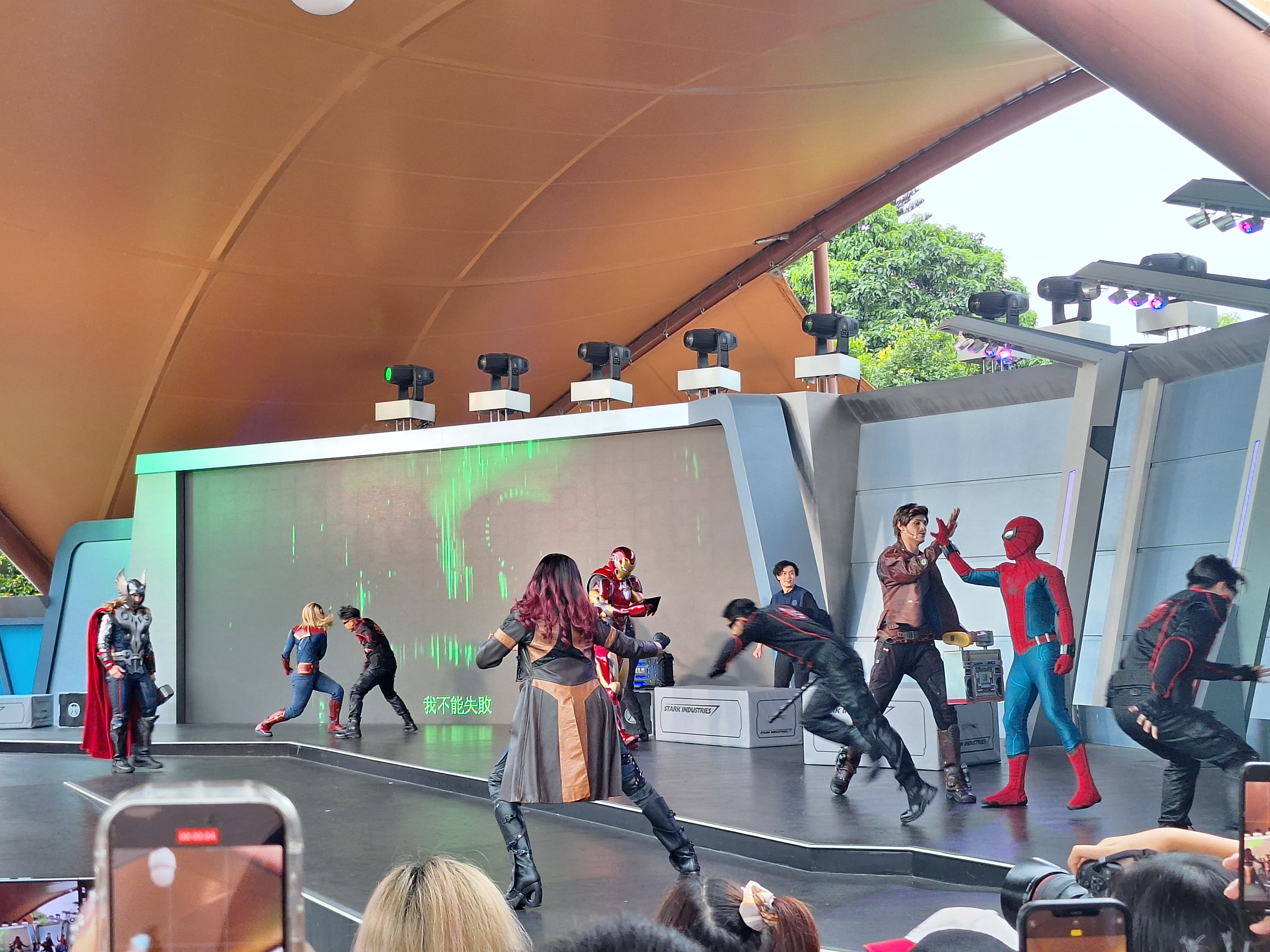
Find Your Super Power: Battle for Stark Expo
(Tomorrowland Theatre)

== Music ==
The music for the themed land at Disney California Adventure was arranged by John Paesano, who referenced themes from the MCU's Avengers, Spider-Man, Doctor Strange, Guardians of the Galaxy, Ant-Man, Captain Marvel, and Black Panther films. A single titled "Welcome Recruits" was digitally released by Hollywood Records and Marvel Music on April 22, 2022.

== See also ==
- Guardians of the Galaxy: Cosmic Rewind
- Disney Hotel New York – The Art of Marvel
- Marvel Super Hero Island
- Pandora – The World of Avatar, a themed land at Disney's Animal Kingdom.
- Star Wars: Galaxy's Edge, a Star Wars themed land at Disneyland Park and Disney's Hollywood Studios.
- World of Frozen, a Frozen themed land at Hong Kong Disneyland and Disney Adventure World.
