= Rogers: The Musical =

Fictional Broadway musical

- Promotional poster
- Music: Alan Menken; Marc Shaiman; Christopher Lennertz
- Lyrics: David Zippel; Marc Shaiman; Scott Wittman; Jordan Peterson; Christopher Lennertz; Alex Karukas
- Book: Hunter Bell
- Setting: Marvel Cinematic Universe
- Basis: Marvel Comics
- Premiere: 2023: Hyperion Theater, Disney California Adventure
- Productions: 2021: Hawkeye; 2022: D23 Expo; 2023: Hyperion Theater

Rogers: The Musical is a fictional Broadway musical in the Marvel Cinematic Universe (MCU) media franchise, centered on the life of Steve Rogers / Captain America. The musical was conceived for the 2021 Marvel Studios Disney+ miniseries Hawkeye by head writer Jonathan Igla. Only the musical number "Save the City", written by Marc Shaiman and Scott Wittman, is seen in the series. The song, which drew mixed responses from viewers, was released as a digital single on November 24, 2021, and performed live at the 2022 D23 Expo. Billboards and posters for the musical have appeared as Easter eggs in several later MCU properties.

A one-act, half-hour version of the musical ran at Disney California Adventure from June through August 2023. Created and directed by Jordan Peterson for Disney Live Entertainment, it had a book by Hunter Bell and five new songs by Christopher Lennertz, Peterson, and Alex Karukas. It was praised for its story and new songs, particularly "What You Missed", and was likened to an actual Broadway musical rather than a theme park show. An original cast album of the Disney California Adventure performance was released on September 15, 2023.

== Premise ==
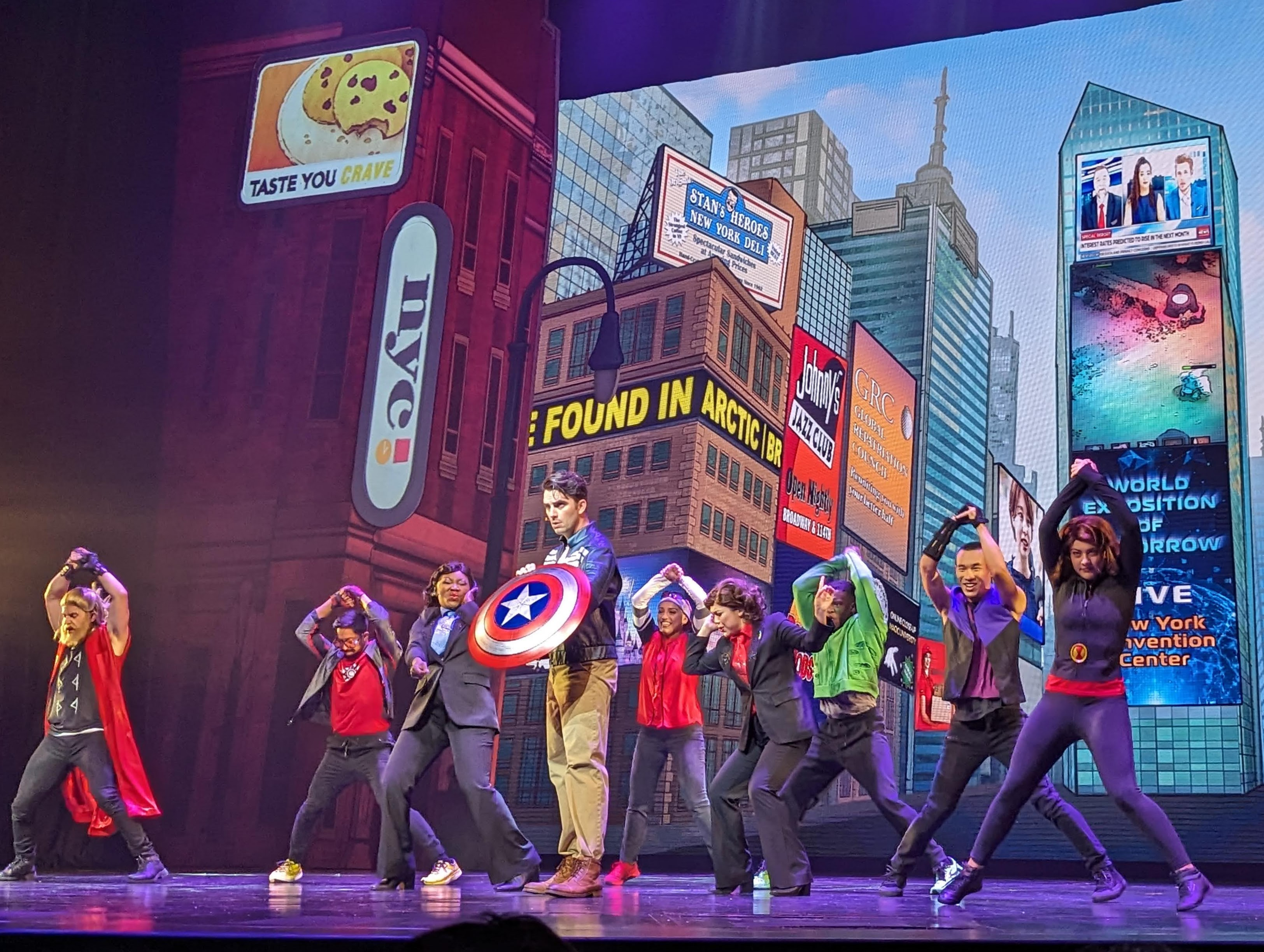
Avengers cast of the Disney California Adventure performance

Rogers: The Musical chronicles the life of Steve Rogers / Captain America from his origins in the 1940s until the events of the film Avengers: Endgame (2019), based on information known to the public in the Marvel Cinematic Universe (MCU). It contains intentional plot inaccuracies such as the presence of Scott Lang / Ant-Man during the Battle of New York.

The Starkettes introduce the story of Steve Rogers, which is "about superheroes, romance, and time travel" ("U-S-Opening Night"). Rogers wants to enlist in the U.S. Army for World War II, but is medically unfit to ("I Want You"). Dr. Abraham Erskine and SSR Agent Peggy Carter recognize Rogers' good and noble heart, and recruit him for their super soldier program, which transforms Rogers into Captain America. Rogers is viewed as the army's mascot and gets sent out on a USO war bond tour rather than heading to the front lines ("Star-Spangled Man"). Carter informs Rogers that the regiment of his friend Bucky Barnes has been captured, with Rogers heading to Germany to battle the Nazis and Hydra. As Rogers attempts to stop a plane with explosives from heading toward the United States, he and Carter promise to go dancing together as they have become close ("Just One Dance (Preprise)"). Rogers gets frozen in the Arctic and is awoken 70 years later by S.H.I.E.L.D. director Nick Fury, who fills Rogers in on the events he missed out on and recruits him to lead the Avengers ("What You Missed"). The Avengers are called into action to stop attacks all over the globe across a number of years ("Save the City"), with Rogers questioning after the fight against Thanos if he can continue fighting and protecting the planet ("Save the City (Playoff)"). His older, time traveler self appears after using the Time Stone to speak to the younger Rogers to remind him about what he has done in his life and encourages him to embrace his chance to be with Carter ("End of the Line"). The younger Rogers then uses the Time Stone to travel back in time to have his dance with Carter and spend his life with her ("Just One Dance"). The Starkettes then return to conclude and recap Rogers' story ("Rogers: The Musical Finale / Save the City (Reprise)").

== Hawkeye (2021) ==
=== Background ===
A real-life Broadway musical based on the Marvel Comics character Captain America had been in development in 1985, but never came to fruition. Jonathan Igla, the head writer of the Marvel Studios Disney+ miniseries Hawkeye (2021), conceived the idea for a fictional musical centered on Rogers after noticing a billboard for the Broadway musical Hamilton (2015). Igla imagined what it would feel like to live in the MCU, where people would feel inspired by Rogers to create a musical based on him to inspire and entertain audiences. He sought to use the musical to introduce emotional and psychological information—Clint Barton / Hawkeye's grief and guilt over Natasha Romanoff / Black Widow's death—through something disguised as funny, exciting, and surprising. Director Rhys Thomas then pitched the idea as a joke to Marvel Studios president Kevin Feige, who quickly gave the go-ahead.

=== "Save the City" ===
"Save the City"
- "Save the City" as performed in "Never Meet Your Heroes"

Song by Adam Pascal, Ty Taylor, Rory Donovan, Derek Klena, Bonnie Milligan, Christopher Sieber, and Shayna Steele

from the album Hawkeye: Vol. 2 (Episodes 4–6) (Original Soundtrack)
- Released: November 24, 2021
- Genre: Show tune
- Length: 4:26
- Label: Hollywood; Marvel Music
- Composer: Marc Shaiman
- Lyricists: Marc Shaiman; Scott Wittman
- Producers: Marc Shaiman; Scott M. Riesett

Video
- "Save The City" (audio only) on YouTube

Feige, who had met composer Marc Shaiman at an event promoting Mary Poppins Returns (2018) for the Academy of Motion Picture Arts and Sciences, enlisted him for Hawkeye because of his Broadway credentials. Shaiman and Scott Wittman wrote "Save the City", envisioning it as the final number of the fictional musical's first act. At Marvel's suggestion, the song was set during the Battle of New York, as depicted in the film The Avengers (2012), which the composers agreed was a good moment to finish a musical's first act. Both immediately had the idea of New Yorkers requesting the Avengers' help, and wrote a verse and a chorus. While Shaiman normally sings while recording demos for his songs, he thought the difficult notes of "Save the City" would not allow him to do so, so he reached out to Broadway performer Adam Pascal to sing on the demo; Ty Taylor was also included as the other main singer, with Rory Donovan singing Captain America's part. Wittman said the song tried to reflect New York City during the COVID-19 pandemic, "this kind of wishing that maybe the Avengers would come and take COVID away". He also added that it had to serve two purposes: be entertaining and make Barton feel uncomfortable. "Save the City" was recorded before the stage performance was filmed in Atlanta, as COVID restrictions prevented the performers other than Pascal and Taylor from traveling to be a part of the filming.

A portion of "Save the City" is shown in "Never Meet Your Heroes", the first episode of Hawkeye. After numerous references to Rogers: The Musical in subsequent episodes, "Save the City" is shown in full during the mid-credits scene of "So This Is Christmas?", the series finale. Thomas had been unaware of the full performance's inclusion, since it was not the initial plan to include it, and was "slightly conflicted about" its inclusion given he had felt the credits slot was being reserved for a scene to tease another MCU project, but understood it ended up being "a fun release at the end, and a nice way to send people off". Hollywood Records and Marvel Music released "Save the City" as a digital single on November 24, 2021, the day of the series' premiere, with it also included on the Hawkeye: Vol. 2 (Episodes 4–6) (Original Soundtrack) album that released on December 22, 2021.

The cast of the performance includes Pascal and Taylor as the two leads, Tom Feeney as Rogers, Aaron Nedrick as Tony Stark / Iron Man, Jason Scott McDonald as Thor, Harris Turner as Bruce Banner / Hulk, Meghan Manning as Romanoff, Avery Gillham as Barton, Jordan Chin as Loki, Nico DeJesus as Lang, and several extras as Chitauri warriors. Other performers include Rory Donovan, Derek Klena, Bonnie Milligan, Christopher Sieber, and Shayna Steele. Fra Fee, who portrays Kazimierz "Kazi" Kazimierczak in the series, was disappointed that he could not participate in the musical's production.

=== Reception ===
Dais Johnston of Inverse enjoyed seeing the MCU from the perspective of its citizens, praising Rogers: The Musical's use of "meta-commentary". Jenelle Riley at Variety felt despite the small amount shown, Rogers: The Musical "achieves something sublime: It's silly but self-aware; a hilarious commentary on consumerism airing on a network owned by Disney; and, perhaps most important, a genuinely clever and catchy number." Rachel Leishman of The Mary Sue wrote that the musical scene in Hawkeye was "so bad it's good", highlighting Barton's reaction to seeing Romanoff's portrayal. Vulture's Jackson McHenry hoped that a potential second season of Hawkeye would answer his questions about the musical. Brady Langmann of Esquire predicted that Rogers: The Musical would lead to an MCU musical film. Mashable's Alexis Nedd envisioned a full-length version of the musical as opening with a flashback of a young Rogers and ending with him embarking on a new mission.

Upon the release of the trailer for Hawkeye, viewers were drawn to the fictional musical, with many noting its similarities to Hamilton. "Save the City" generated over 1 million on-demand official streams in the U.S., according to Luminate. Some viewers expressed disappointment at "Save the City" being the mid-credits scene of "So This Is Christmas?", a response Shaiman described as "bittersweet".

== 2022 D23 Expo ==
External videos
- D23 'Rogers: The Musical' Performance presents the live performance of "Save the City" at the 2022 D23 Expo, YouTube video from Variety's channel

"Save the City" was performed live at Marvel Studios' D23 Expo panel on September 10, 2022, featuring 22 performers and a six-piece rhythm section led by Shaiman.

== Disney California Adventure ==
Rogers: The Musical
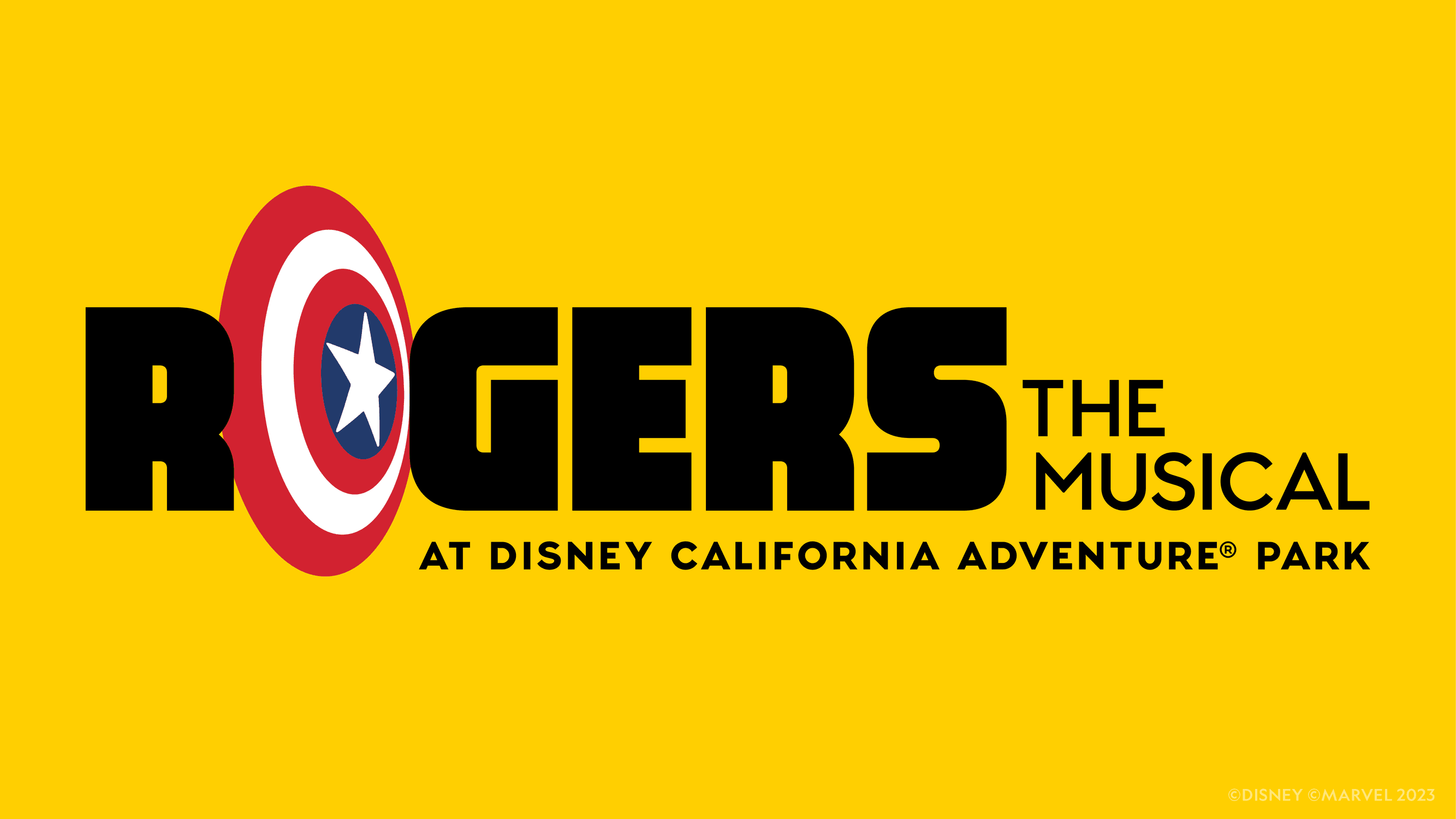

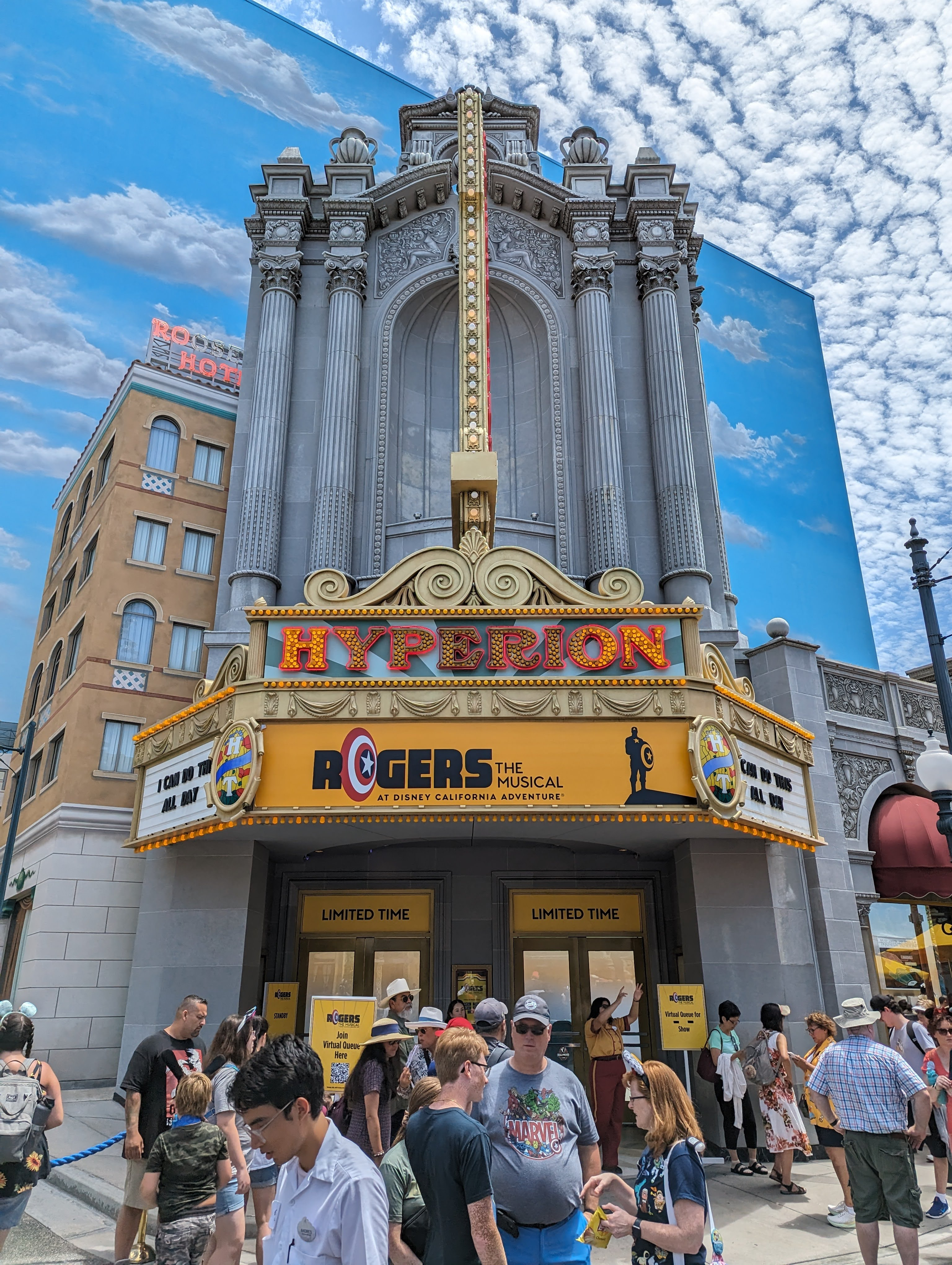
- Hyperion Theater marquee in August 2023

Disney California Adventure
- Area: Hollywood Land
- Coordinates: 33°48′27.56″N 117°54′59.94″W
- Status: Closed
- Opening date: June 30, 2023
- Closing date: August 31, 2023
- Replaced: Frozen – Live at the Hyperion (2016–2020)

Ride statistics
- Attraction type: Stage show
- Designer: Disney Live Entertainment
- Theme: Marvel Cinematic Universe
- Audience capacity: Approx. 2,000 per show
- Duration: 30 minutes
- Virtual queue: Disneyland Virtual Queue available
- Wheelchair accessible
- Assistive listening available

=== Development ===
Shortly after Hawkeye's release, executive producer Trinh Tran expressed interest in a real-life version of Rogers: The Musical, while Shaiman and Wittman expressed interest in writing a full-length version of the musical. Disney Live Entertainment began inquiring with Marvel Studios about creating a full version of the musical following the D23 performance of "Save the City".

In February 2023, it was announced that a one-act stage show version of Rogers: The Musical would be performed at the Hyperion Theater in Hollywood Land at Disney California Adventure for a limited time, created and directed by Jordan Peterson for Disney Live Entertainment. It features a book by Hunter Bell along with the songs "Save the City", "Star Spangled Man" by Alan Menken and David Zippel from the film Captain America: The First Avenger (2011), and five original songs with music by Christopher Lennertz and lyrics by Peterson, Lennertz, and Alex Karukas. Lennertz also served as conductor and arranger for Rogers: The Musical, with Karukas also arranging the music. Orchestrations for the musical were done by Michael Starobin, Charlie Rosen, Macy Schmidt, and Andrew Kinney. Lennertz previously composed the music for the Agent Carter One-Shot (2013) and television series (2015–2016).

=== Performance ===
Before the show began, "period-appropriate jazzy tunes" were played through an onstage radio, one of which referenced the Elias & Co. store on Buena Vista Street in the park. The performance includes the Starkettes, who serve as a Greek chorus for the show, Rogers, Peggy Carter, Abraham Erskine, Nick Fury, and select members of the Avengers, with the character's costumes resembling those from the films in a "fun, more casual" look. Rogers: The Musical only features one cast (not typical for theme park shows, which usually have multiple performers for each role), many of whom were reportedly based out of New York and had Broadway experience. The cast, as featured on the original cast album, includes: Bella Hicks and Krystle Rose' Simmons as the Starkettes; Josey Montana McCoy as pre-serum Rogers and Luke Monday as Rogers / Captain America; Rachel Wirtz as Carter; and Jay Donnell as Fury, among additional ensemble members. Sarah Kobayashi from Disney Live Entertainment served as choreographer, with her choreography utilizing the show's different time periods to incorporate period-appropriate dance styles "with a modern twist". Kobayashi also tailored specific movements that would make sense for each character; for example, Thor can be seen joyfully dancing while Loki makes "sly moves". Layered scenery, physical set pieces, and a video screen were used to create each setting in the show. Bell chose to focus the one-act on the love story of Rogers and Carter since "[g]reat love stories make great musicals".

The new songs include: "U-S-Opening Night", sung by the Starkettes to frame the show; "I Want You", Rogers' "I Want" song about enlisting in the army; "What You Missed", sung by Fury to explain to a recently awakened Rogers what he has missed while he was frozen for 70 years, described by Lennertz as a patter song that meets "Uptown Funk". It includes excerpts of the "I Love Lucy Theme" by Eliot Daniel and "The Imperial March" by John Williams; "End of the Line", described as a "reflective twist" on Rogers' fate; and "Just One Dance", a ballad about the "lost romance" between Rogers and Carter. The music was described as "big band jazz, modern funk, [and] classic orchestra", and was performed by a 60-piece orchestra. Alan Silvestri's Captain America and Avengers themes are featured in the music.

Rogers: The Musical ran approximately 30 minutes and premiered on June 30, 2023, as part of Disney's centennial celebrations. Performances occurred multiple times a day on Tuesday through Saturday most weeks, and ran until August 31, 2023. Themed food was made available at various locations around the park, as well as a "Premium Viewing Experience" package that offered a souvenir popcorn bucket and priority seating for the show, in addition to themed merchandise. A longer version of the musical during development had a larger role for Bucky Barnes. His role was ultimately reduced in the one-act because of time constraints, with lines he said in the films given to Carter, which allowed the creatives to feature them. Lennertz was hopeful an expanded role for Barnes in a future version of the show would be able to include a song with him and Rogers.

=== Recordings ===
An original cast album of Rogers: The Musical was released digitally by Walt Disney Records on September 15, 2023, which was produced by Matthew P. Selby, Lennertz, and Karukas.

Rogers: The Musical (Original Cast Recording)
No.	Title	Performer(s)	Length
1.	"U.S. Opening Night"	Bella Hicks, Krystle Rose' Simmons, Alex Karukas, Matthew P. Selby, and cast of Rogers: The Musical	3:55
2.	"I Want You"	Josey Montana McCoy	3:40
3.	"Star-Spangled Man"	Bella Hicks, Krystle Rose' Simmons, and cast of Rogers: The Musical	3:21
4.	"Just One Dance (Preprise 1)"	Luke Monday and Rachel Wirtz	0:52
5.	"Star-Spangled Man (Reprise) / Just One Dance (Preprise 2)"	Luke Monday and Rachel Wirtz	1:33
6.	"What You Missed"	Jay Donnell, Bella Hicks, Krystle Rose' Simmons, and Luke Monday	4:01
7.	"Save the City"	Bella Hicks, Andrew Hubert, Luke Monday, Alex Karukas, and cast of Rogers: The Musical	2:48
8.	"Save the City (Playoff)"	Luke Monday and cast of Rogers: The Musical	1:02
9.	"End of the Line"	Luke Monday and Josey Montana McCoy	3:50
10.	"Just One Dance"	Rachel Wirtz and Luke Monday	2:10
11.	"Rogers: The Musical Finale / Save the City (Reprise)"	Luke Monday, Rachel Wirtz, Josey Montana McCoy, Jay Donnell, Andrew Huber, Bella Hicks, Krystle Rose' Simmons, and Alex Karukas	1:41
12.	"Rogers: The Musical (Playoff)"	Christopher Lennertz and Alex Karukas	0:42
Total length:			29:35

=== Reception ===
Rogers: The Musical was noted for its direction and production value, despite being a theme park show. Dirk Libbey at CinemaBlend called it "a fantastic piece of musical theater", being impressed by what Disney Live Entertainment created, noting it "raises the bar of what a stage show at a theme park can be". Reviewing the show for the Los Angeles Times, Todd Martens said "there's plenty in these 30 minutes to smile at", with the show "lean[ing] heavily into theater tropes rather than contemporary theme park trickery", such as its "clever use of projections", and more contemporary costuming, which added to its charm. Pam Kragen at The San Diego Union-Tribune felt, "As theme park shows go, Rogers: The Musical is a good one, thanks to its familiar storyline, comic book-inspired scenic design, special effects and quick pacing. Director Jordan Peterson has imbued the show with winking humor, but not at the expense of the characters who are presented with humble authenticity." The Orange County Register's Brady Macdonald said Rogers: The Musical is "the Marvel musical you didn't know you were waiting for and won't be able to stop talking about. The breezy and brisk theme park show expertly walks a fine line, taking itself seriously, but not too seriously." Game Rant's Anthony Taormina said, "With impeccable choreography, impressive sets, and endearing performances, Rogers: The Musical is another must-see at Disney's California parks."

Jenelle Riley at Variety said the musical "truly has a Broadway vibe" and gave praise to the ASL interpreters who were able to relay both the dialogue and emotions of the musical with their faces and signing. IGN's Joshua Yehl called it "the best Marvel musical ever put to stage", enjoying how many of its comics and MCU inspirations translated to the musical format. Reviewing the musical for Gizmodo, Sabina Graves said it was a "surprisingly uplifting one-act parody" and "a worthy Disney Parks musical". Many reviewers hoped the one-act led to a full-fledged Rogers: The Musical or more musicals based on Marvel Comics.

Bell's book and Lennertz's music was also praised. Keith Caulfield from Billboard called the one-act performance "full of goofy humor and a range of musical styles". The book was noted for being earnest and having "heart", such as the Rogers-Carter love story that added to what was in the films "in some surprising ways", and Bell being able to add "fresh and unexpected turns" to the story familiar to MCU fans. However, the condensed runtime drew some criticism for not being able to linger on many moments for too long, with Martens saying "the show feels heavily expository and plot-driven" and "like a 'greatest hits' compendium of Captain America moments", which was likely due to needing to fit within the theme park medium. Yehl enjoyed the performances by both actors portraying Rogers, with both "do[ing] an excellent job of channeling Steve's effortless earnestness and heroic attitude". Fury in the show was compared to Genie from the Aladdin (2011) musical. Lennertz's music was likened to songs that would be heard in musicals performing on Broadway. Fury's song "What You Missed" was considered a stand out, though Martens felt despite this, none of the new songs reached the heights of "Save the City" and that much of the musical felt like "puzzle pieces constructed around" the use of that song. Yehl called "End of the Line" with the two Rogers actors having a duet together "a frankly ridiculous moment, but it's so very Marvel and is used to such great effect that it hits you in the feels nonetheless". Graves said the song was "beautifully done" given it "could have so easily not worked".

== References in other media ==
Billboards and posters for Rogers: The Musical appear as Easter eggs in the films Spider-Man: No Way Home (2021) and Doctor Strange in the Multiverse of Madness (2022), as well as the Disney+ series She-Hulk: Attorney at Law (2022), Daredevil: Born Again (2025), and Wonder Man (2026). The billboards in Wonder Man indicate that the musical has been made into a film. An advertisement for the musical could also be seen on a fictitious The Daily Bugle newspaper sold at a newsstand in Manhattan's Upper East Side, as part of a viral marketing campaign in promotion for No Way Home.

== See also ==
- Spider-Man Live!, a 2002 touring show based on the Marvel Comics
- Spider-Man: Turn Off the Dark, a 2011 Broadway musical based on the Marvel Comics
- Marvel Universe Live!, a 2014 touring show based on the Marvel Comics
