= Hyperion Theater =

Theater at Disney California Adventure in Anaheim, California, United States

Coordinates: 33°48′27.56″N 117°54′59.94″W

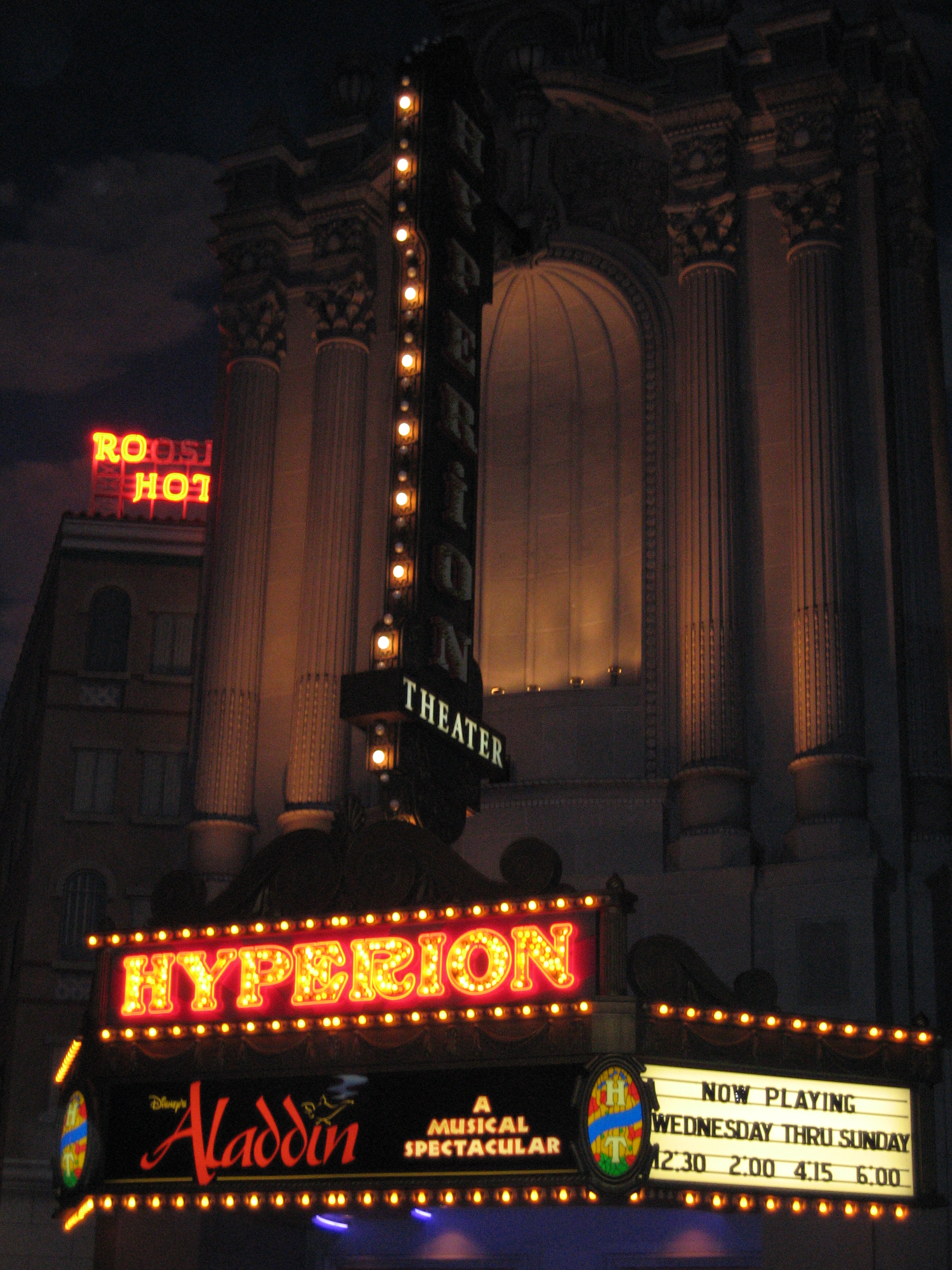
- The theater marquee at night in 2006.

Disney California Adventure
- Area: Hollywood Land
- Opening date: February 8, 2001

Ride statistics
- Attraction type: Theater
- Designer: Walt Disney Imagineering
- Audience capacity: 2,000 per show

The Hyperion Theater is a theater located at Disney California Adventure in Hollywood Land. The theater can seat up to 1,984 people.

The facade is modeled after that of the Los Angeles Theatre on LA's Broadway.

== History ==
The Hyperion Theater opened with the park on February 8, 2001.

The theater held the world premiere for Spy Kids on March 18, 2001.

The venue's first show was Disney's Steps in Time, a musical featuring songs from various Disney films. Later that year, The Power of Blast, a scaled-down version of the musical Blast! was created for the theater. The Power of Blast closed in fall 2002 to make room for Disney's Aladdin: A Musical Spectacular. Inspired by Disney Animation's 1992 film Aladdin, the show premiered in January 2003.

In spring 2010, it was initially announced that Disney's Aladdin: A Musical Spectacular would close and be replaced by Toy Story: The Musical. However, later that year it was announced that the plans were cancelled and that the Aladdin musical would remain for the time being.

The theater also held the world premiere for Disney's The Lone Ranger on June 22, 2013.

Disney's Aladdin: A Musical Spectacular closed in January 2016. It was announced that the venue's next show would be a musical inspired by Disney Animation's 2013 film Frozen, entitled Frozen – Live at the Hyperion. The show premiered in May 2016.

The theater's most recent show was a one-act version of Rogers: The Musical, the fictional Broadway musical that was first introduced in the Disney+ series Hawkeye, based around the Marvel Cinematic Universe character Captain America. The show ran from June 30 to August 31, 2023.

== Accidents ==
In April 2003, a 36-year-old stage technician fell 60 feet from a catwalk in the theater, prompting an investigation by the California Occupational Safety and Health Administration (Cal/OSHA). The victim did not regain consciousness following the incident and died in May 2003. In October 2003, Cal/OSHA fined the Disneyland Resort $18,350 for safety violations related to the cast member's death.

In September 2011, a performance of Disney's Aladdin: A Musical Spectacular was immediately stopped when the flying carpet, while flying out over the audience, stopped and flipped over with two performers on it who were strapped in. No one was hurt in the incident.
