= Disney's Aladdin: A Musical Spectacular =

Stage show at Disney California Adventure

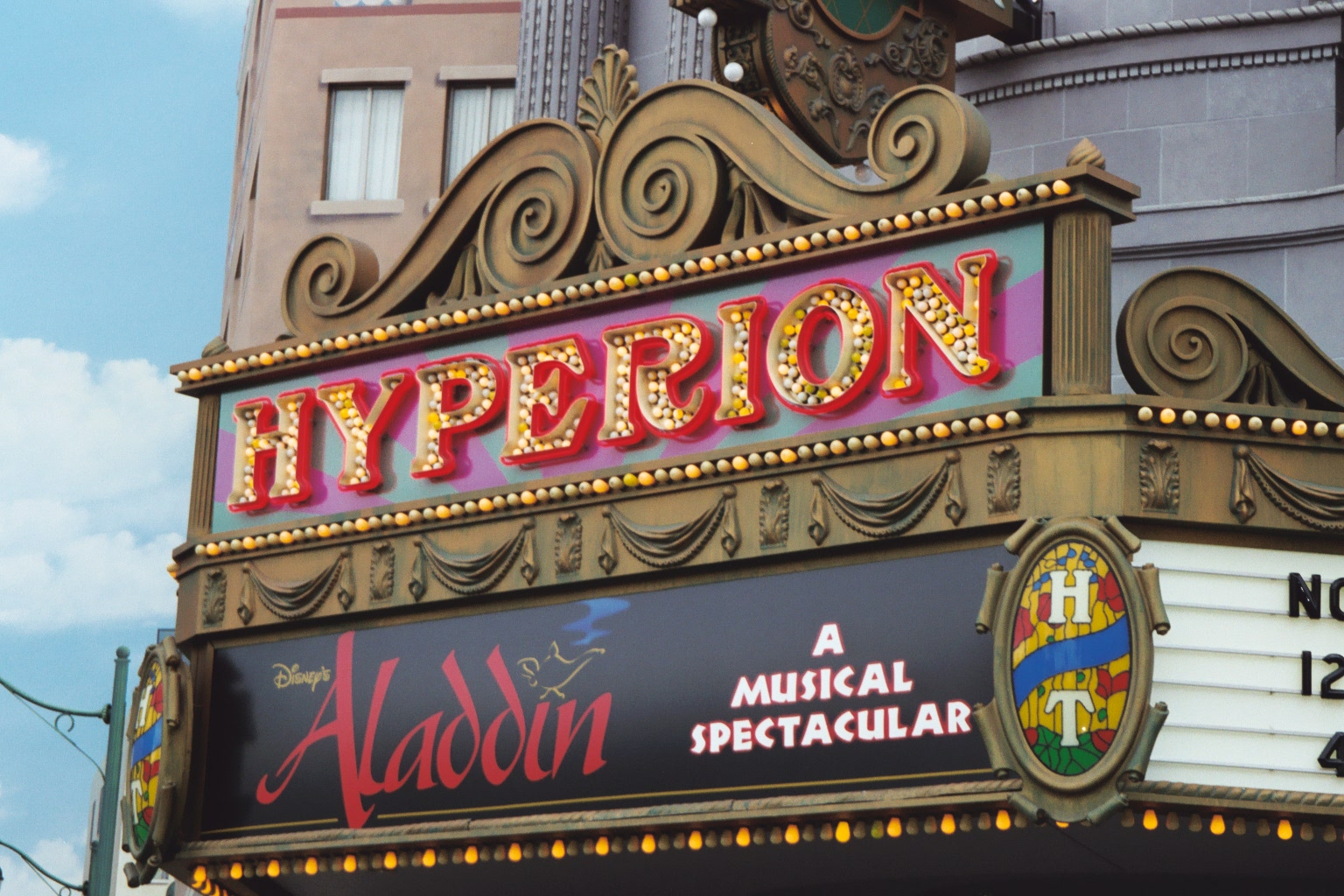
- The Aladdin marquee in 2010

Disney California Adventure
- Area: Hollywood Land
- Status: Removed
- Opening date: January 16, 2003
- Closing date: January 11, 2016
- Replaced: The Power of Blast
- Replaced by: Frozen – Live at the Hyperion

Disney Fantasy
- Status: Operating
- Opening date: March 31, 2012

Disney Wish
- Status: Operating
- Opening date: July 14, 2022

Ride statistics
- Attraction type: Musical
- Designer: Walt Disney Creative Entertainment
- Theme: Aladdin
- Music: Alan Menken
- Duration: 45 minutes
- Lyrics: Howard Ashman; Tim Rice
- Composition: Timothy Williams
- Book: Chad Beguelin
- Basis: Aladdin (film)
- Wheelchair accessible
- Assistive listening available

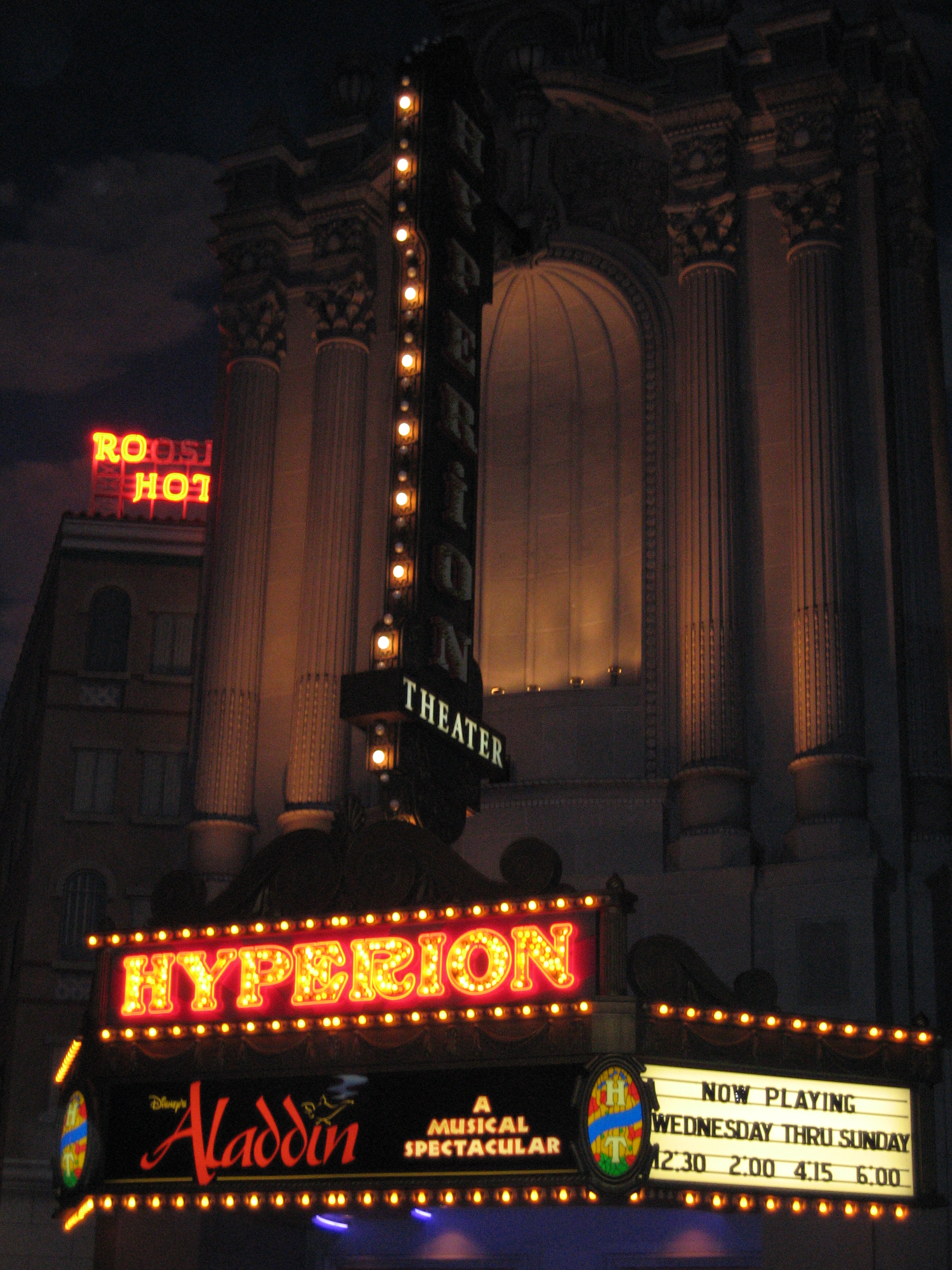
Hyperion Theater marquee at night in 2006.

Disney's Aladdin: A Musical Spectacular is a 45-minute Broadway-style musical theatre show based on Disney Animation's 1992 film Aladdin with music by Alan Menken and lyrics by Howard Ashman and Tim Rice.

About 14,000 performances were held inside the 2,000-seat Hyperion Theater in Hollywood Land at Disney California Adventure from 2003 to 2016, after which the show was replaced by Frozen – Live at the Hyperion, a musical show inspired by Disney Animation's 2013 film Frozen.

A version of the show continues to play on board the Disney Cruise Line ships Disney Fantasy and Disney Wish.

== Cast ==
- Dylan White, Miles Wesley – Aladdin
- Deedee Magno Hall, Cassandra Marie Murphy – Jasmine
- Nick Santa Maria, Orville Mendoza – Genie
- Megan Sheahan – Carpet
- Jance Roberts, Gabriel Manro – Jafar
- Jamila Ajibade – Narrator

== History ==
The production is a Broadway-type show. Many of the scenes and songs from the movie are re-created on stage and some of the action spills out into the aisles, such as Prince Ali's arrival in Agrabah on elephant back.

At Disney California Adventure, the 45-minute production took place in the 2,000 seat Hyperion Theater, located at the end of Hollywood Land. While most of the show was scripted, the Genie's dialogue often changed to reflect current events in the news and popular culture. The musical replaced the venue's previous show, The Power of Blast, which played from 2001 to 2002.

In September 2015, it was announced that the show's final day of performance would be January 10, 2016. and it was replaced by a musical stage show inspired by Disney's animated film Frozen, which opened in May 2016.

== Soundtrack ==
Buena Vista Records released an official soundtrack to the production in 2003. This is an original cast recording, and includes almost every piece of music used in the show. The main cast on the recording is Miles Wesley (Aladdin), Deedee Magno (Jasmine), Nick Santa Maria (Genie), Lance Roberts (Jafar) and Jamila Ajibade (Narrator). Orchestrations by Timothy Williams.

Track Listing
1. Arabian Nights*/A Thousand Stories/Who Dares Approach (1:43)
2. Off You Go/The Mouth Closes (:34)
3. You Have Been Warned (:11)
4. Aladdin Intro (:24)
5. One Jump Ahead (2:44)
6. Street Rat! (:24)
7. Princess of Agrabah (:14)
8. Old Man (:48)
9. Go Now, Into the Cave/Gold Reveal/Cave Collapse (1:57)
10. Carpet (:39)
11. Genie Up (:22)
12. Friend Like Me (3:18)
13. The Palace (:25)
14. Sultan's Fanfare (:13)
15. Prince Ali (2:04)
16. Genie Free/Jafar Plots (1:27)
17. To Be Free (2:44)
18. A Whole New World (3:38)
19. A Whole New World - Underscore (:20)
20. I'll Say (:42)
21. We Through Yet/Prince Ali (Reprise) (1:36)
22. Snake! (:41)
23. He Has More Power (:50)
24. Father, I've Decided (:59)
25. Celebration (1:36) (includes "Arabian Nights", "To Be Free", "A Whole New World")
26. Curtain Call (1:13) (includes: "One Jump Ahead", "Prince Ali", "To Be Free", "Friend Like Me")

== Gallery ==
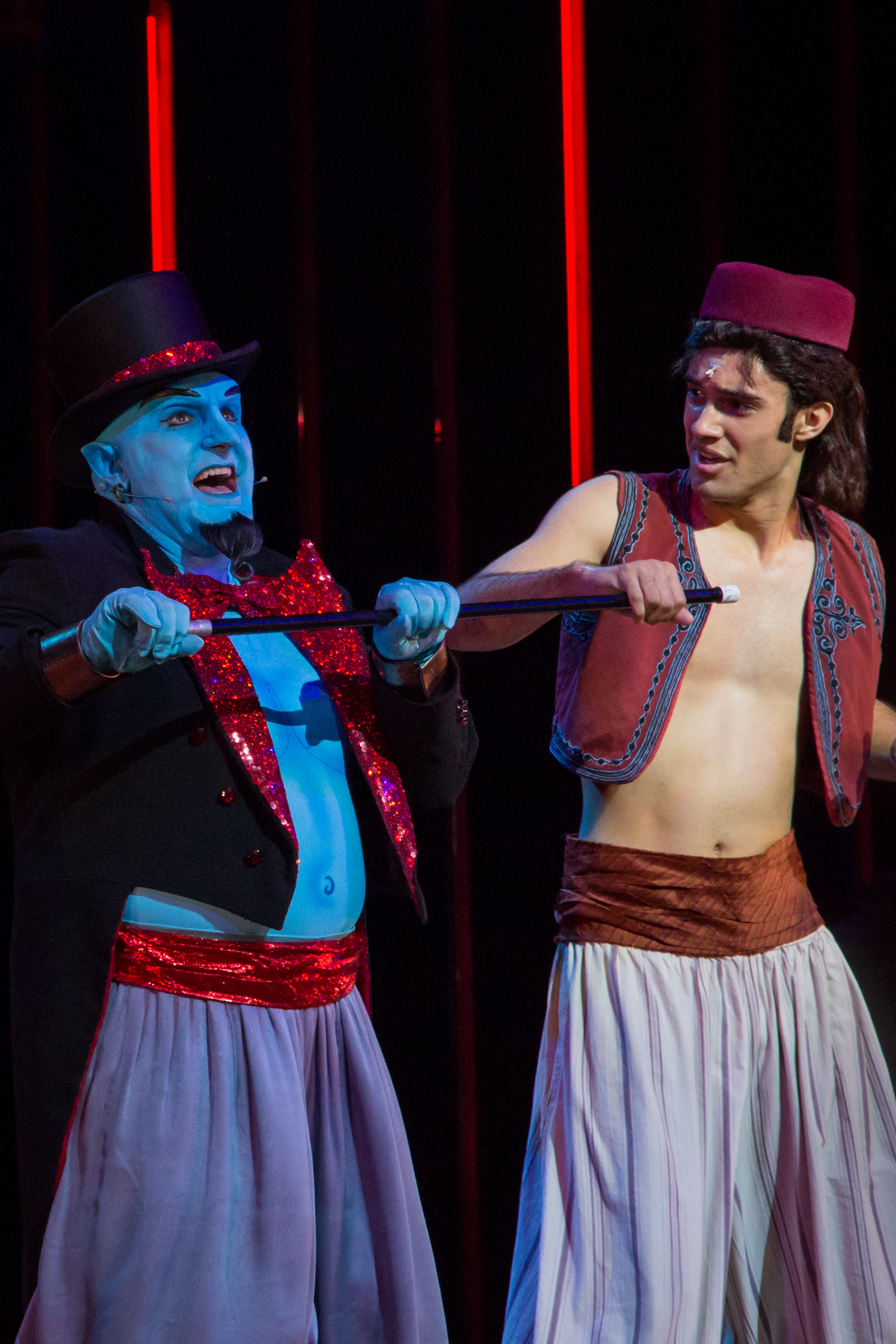

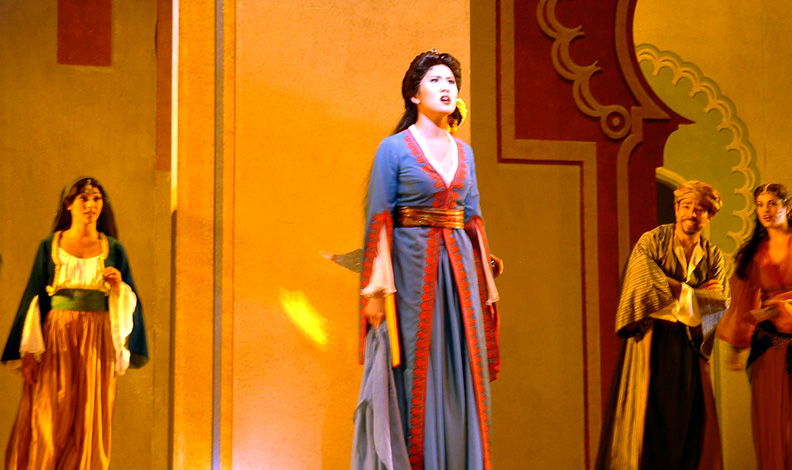
Jasmine reveals herself to be the Princess of Agrabah

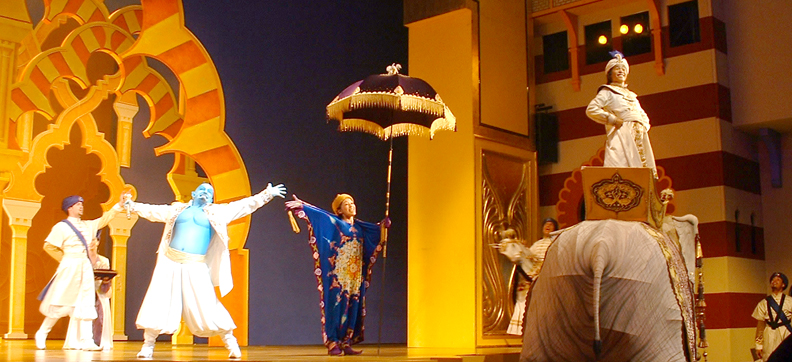
Aladdin's entrance as "Prince Ali"

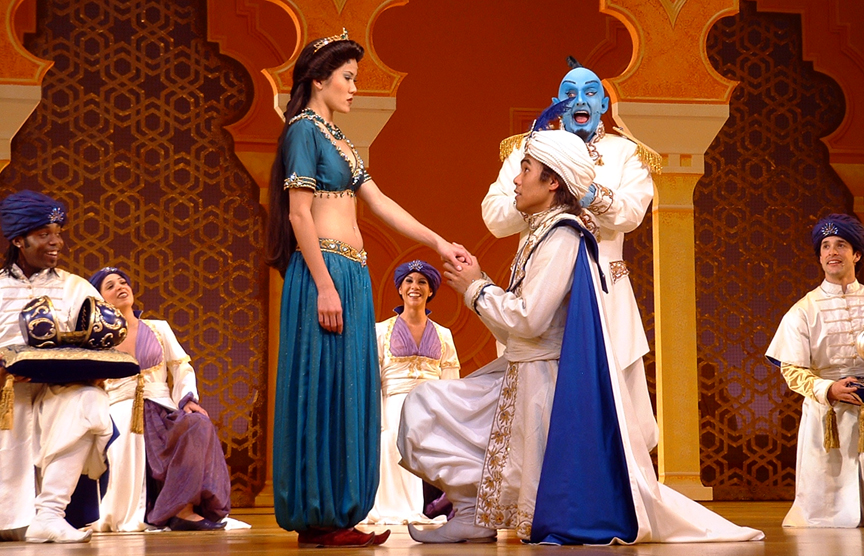
"Prince Ali" proposes to Jasmine

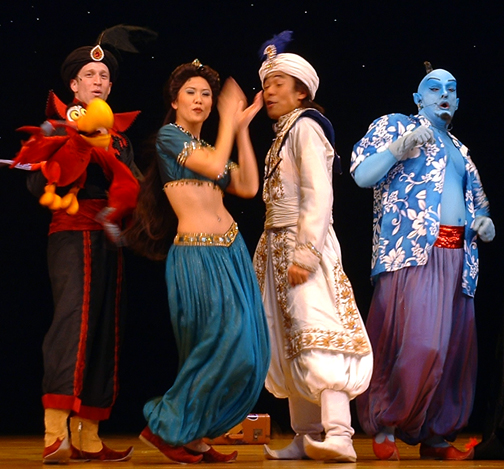
Iago, Jasmine, "Prince Ali", and the Genie

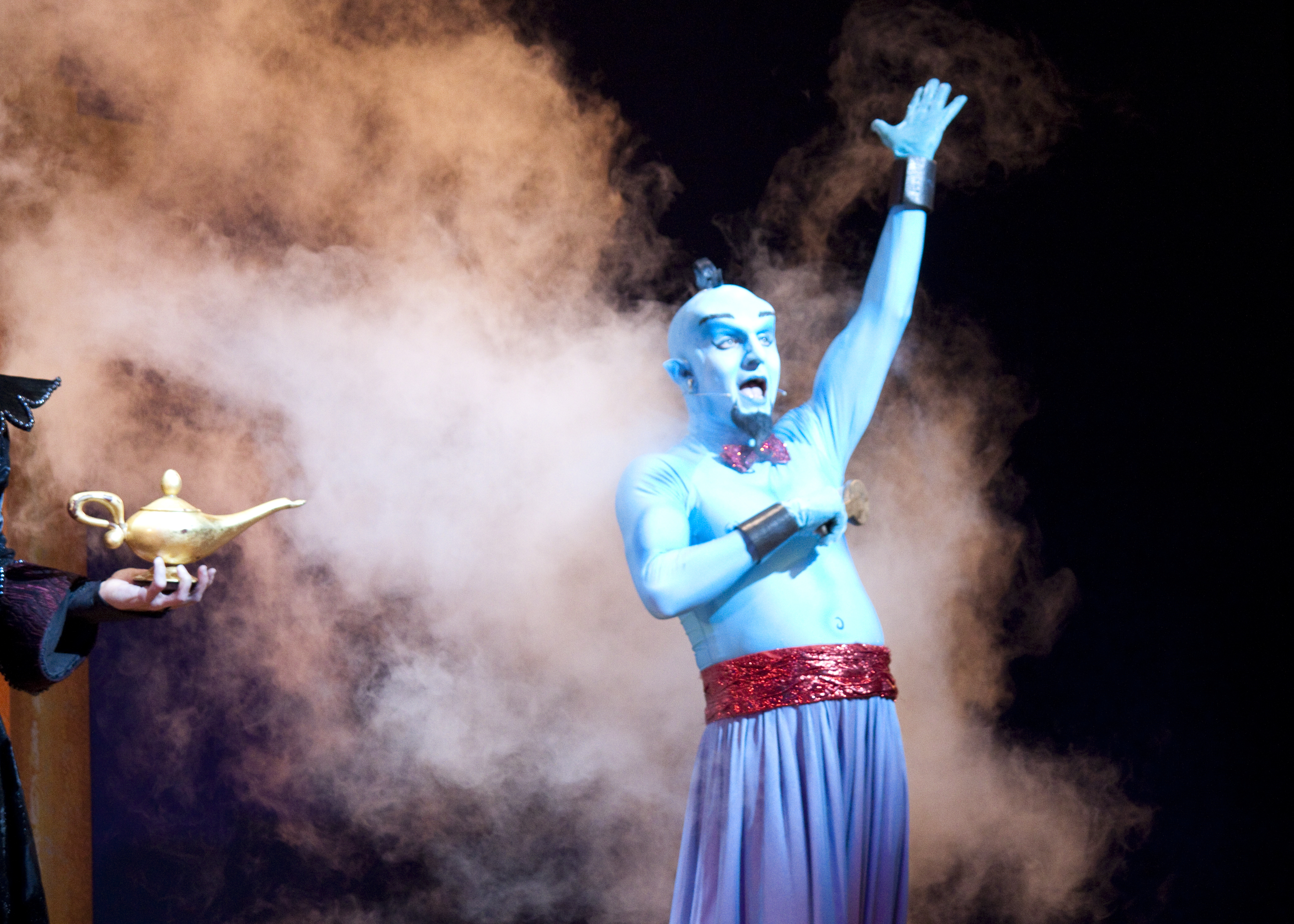
Jafar summons the Genie

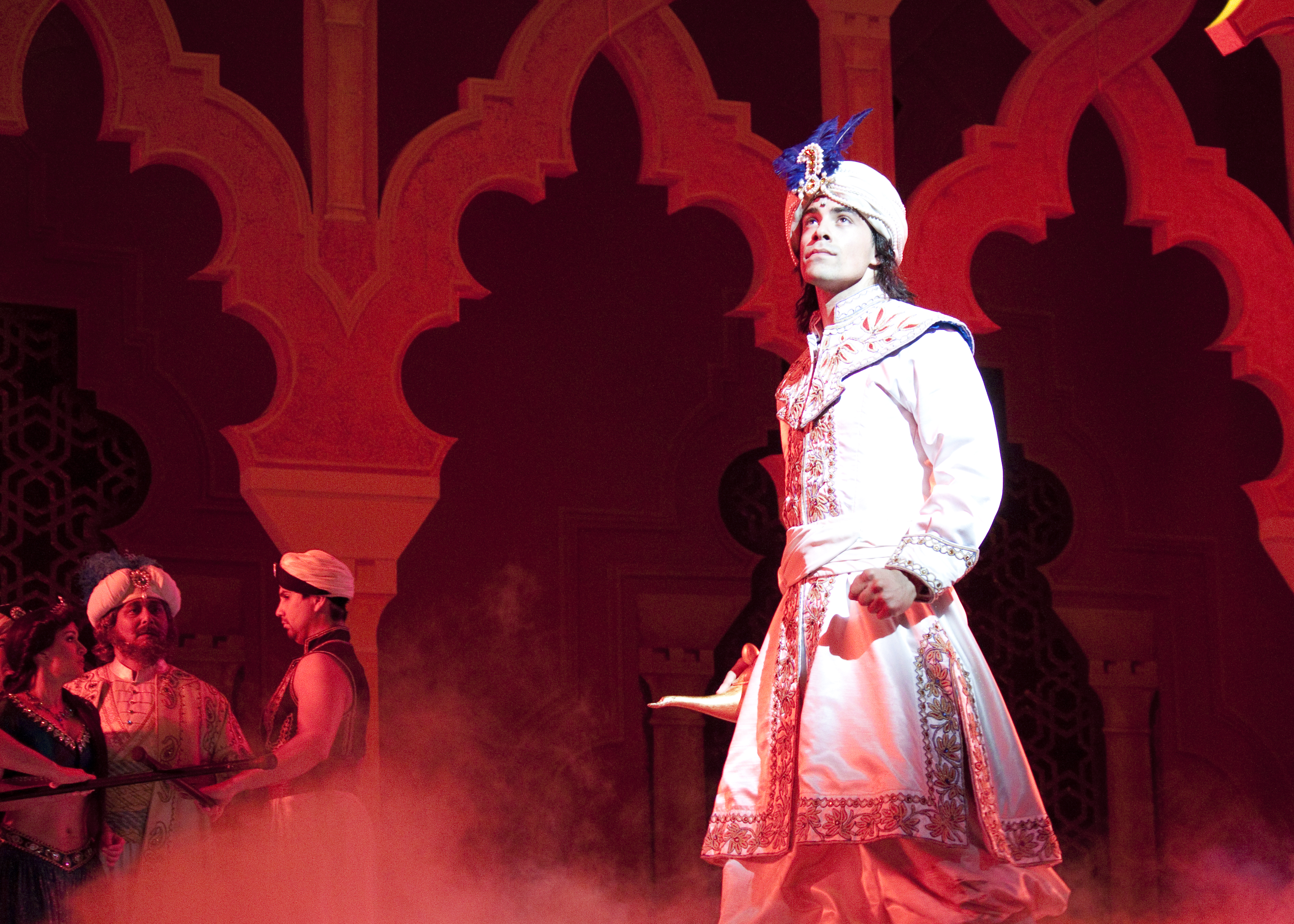
"Prince Ali" holding the lamp

== See also ==
- Beauty and the Beast Live on Stage
- Aladdin (2011 musical)
