= Superstar Limo =

Former ride at Disney California Adventure

Coordinates: 33°48′29″N 117°55′03″W

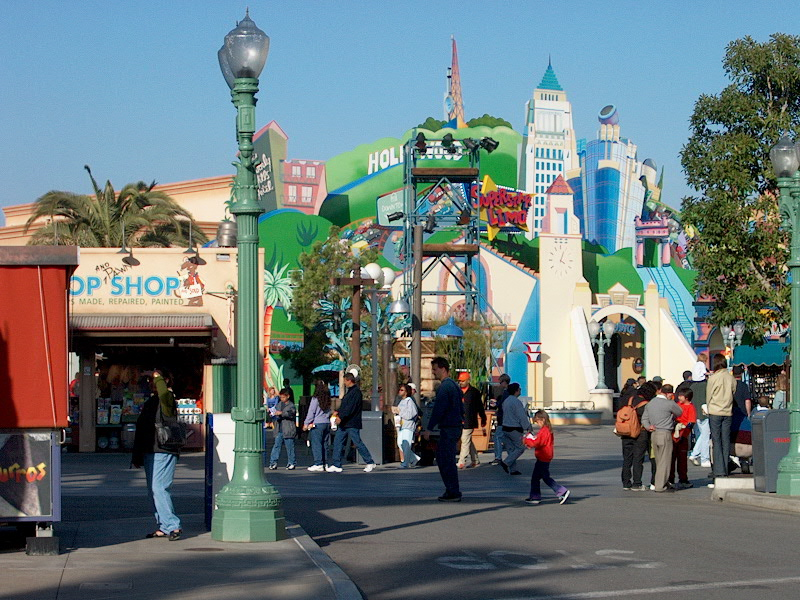

Disney California Adventure
- Area: Hollywood Pictures Backlot
- Status: Removed
- Opening date: February 8, 2001
- Closing date: January 11, 2002
- Replaced by: Monsters, Inc. Mike & Sulley to the Rescue!

Ride statistics
- Attraction type: Dark ride
- Manufacturer: Ride & Show Engineering, Inc.
- Designer: Walt Disney Imagineering
- Theme: Hollywood
- Music: George Wilkins
- Duration: 3:30

Superstar Limo was a dark ride that opened on February 8, 2001, in Disney California Adventure at the Disneyland Resort in Anaheim, California. The premise of the ride was that riders were a new celebrity arriving in Hollywood for their movie premiere, where they enter a small limo that slowly drives them around a stylized version of Los Angeles, encountering various celebrities. The ride received a negative reception from park guests, resulting in its closure on January 11, 2002. It was later replaced by an attraction based on Pixar's 2001 film Monsters, Inc. called Monsters, Inc. Mike & Sulley to the Rescue!, which opened on January 22, 2006.

== History ==
The original concept for the attraction was to make riders into celebrities attempting to evade paparazzi on a wild high-speed ride through Hollywood. Reportedly, video clips of Michael Eisner (in his official role at the time as Disney chairman and chief executive officer) would have book-ended the ride. At the start, he would greet riders as they arrived at Los Angeles International Airport, remind them they had not yet signed their big contract with Disney, and promise he would be waiting at Grauman's Chinese Theatre with the contract after they escaped the paparazzi. At the end, he would appear again to politely explain the riders had been caught by paparazzi cameras and therefore the contract was void. Riders would then exit into the attached gift shop, where tabloid newspapers featuring their photographs (as taken during the chase) would be available for purchase.

The death of Princess Diana in a car crash in Paris on August 31, 1997, forced Walt Disney Imagineering to radically redesign the ride. Since paparazzi had been following Diana at the time of her crash, a ride built around the tendency of paparazzi to chase celebrities at high speed was now considered insensitive. Eisner was replaced with a fictional Hollywood agent, and the ride was dramatically slowed down. Visual gags intended to be seen at high speed no longer made sense, so the ride was filled with celebrity figures to compensate for the change in pacing. Construction of Superstar Limo would officially begin in the spring of 1999.

Superstar Limo was situated in the Hollywood Pictures Backlot area and was one of the original attractions featured on the park's opening day on February 8, 2001. It was the park's single dark ride at the time of its opening. The celebrity figures were stylized and caricatured. Though most of them had moving arms and heads, Disney's lifelike Audio-Animatronics technologies were not used in the attraction.

The attraction closed in January 2002, due to negative reception from guests, making it the park's first ride to permanently close. One idea that was reportedly considered was to re-theme the attraction as Goofy's Superstar Limo. However, the plan never came to fruition. Another reported idea was to change the attraction into Miss Piggy's Superstar Limo, featuring The Muppets, but these plans were once again dropped. The building remained unused until it was surrounded by construction walls in March 2005. It was replaced by an attraction based on Pixar's Monsters, Inc. entitled Monsters, Inc. Mike & Sulley to the Rescue!, which opened on January 23, 2006. The Monsters, Inc. ride uses the same track and vehicles as Superstar Limo, with the limos repainted and redressed as taxicabs and the celebrity figures recycled and redressed as Child Detection Agency Agent figures.

In the 2019 documentary series The Imagineering Story, Bruce Vaughn, Chief Creative Executive (2007–2016, 2023–present) of Walt Disney Imagineering, described the creation of Superstar Limo:

[y]ou can't point to the people of Imagineers actually working on [the attraction]. The culture wasn't really listening to each other. They would just go into these little pods of, 'this is my land', or 'this is my attraction, and I'm not... and I've lost touch with my peers,' and there's no sense of, 'hey, wait a minute, is this good enough?' Each step of the way, you sort of buy in further of, like, 'okay, there's no turning back, we just have to keep going.' The original conceit was probably too self-referential about Hollywood, it was a paparazzi ride and you're catching celebrities. Then you end up with Princess Diana dying right midway while the project is being installed, and suddenly paparazzi are, like, 'that's a really bad theme.' Well, you're, hey... You're almost done, what are you gonna do? So now it turns into, 'you're gonna be a star.' And then now it's an agent, but all the figures are these grotesque, kind of, like... It just didn't work.

== Synopsis ==
The attraction's purple "stretch limo" ride vehicles took riders through a cartoony rendition of Hollywood. The story of the attraction placed the rider as Hollywood's newest celebrity, starting out at Los Angeles International Airport and then boarding a limousine taking them through a variety of locations and situations on the way to the premiere of their new movie at Grauman's Chinese Theatre. Riders were introduced to animated figures modeled in the likeness of celebrities during the ride.

The celebrities in the attraction were Joan Rivers (portrayed by a puppet and appearing on TV screens in the attraction's queue announcing the arrival of the riders, who she describes as "Hollywood's newest sensation"), Regis Philbin, Melanie Griffith, Antonio Banderas, Cindy Crawford, Tim Allen, Jackie Chan, Drew Carey, Cher, and Whoopi Goldberg. A fictional Hollywood talent agent named Swifty La Rue (portrayed by a puppet) appeared infrequently on small in-seat video screens, reminding the riders not to be late to their movie premiere.

Locations included the greater Los Angeles and Hollywood areas including Rodeo Drive (where Philbin, Griffith, Banderas, and Crawford were located), the Sunset Strip (where Allen and Chan were located before the riders were abducted by a UFO), Bel Air (where Carey was shown handing out maps to the stars homes, right before the riders were chased by sponsors and headed "underwater"), Malibu (where Cher was located before the riders headed to a tattoo store), the interior of a soundstage called "Superstar Studios" where writers and cameramen greeted the riders, Grauman's Chinese Theatre (where Goldberg greeted the riders at the premiere of their movie and congratulated them, while crowds of fans in the background cheered), and a billboard that displayed an image captured of the riders and their movie (titled "The Story Of YOU!").

The ride ended at a street of stores filled with "You" merchandise, with the talent agent declaring to the riders that their movie was a success and they are a superstar.

== Reception ==
Superstar Limo received an overwhelmingly negative reception from park guests. It was criticized for its aesthetics and Hollywood-themed jokes and format, and it was noted for having a concept that did not meet Disney's standards of storytelling.

In an early review of California Adventure in The Boston Globe, Anne Chalfant stated: "Kids will also like Superstar Limo, in the Hollywood Pictures Backlot area. Here you play the star, riding in your purple limo past a few audio-animatronic Hollywood celebrities. Adults will notice, however, that other painted plywood characters and sets are about on a par with college theater constructions." Similarly, James Sterngold of The New York Times called it "probably the shlockiest attraction in the new park."

An article by David Rorden in the Longview Daily News said: "The space would be better devoted to something more entertaining, such as an Audioanimatronic dentist doing root canals on all Imagineers who came up with the idea for Superstar Limo."

== See also ==
- List of former Disney California Adventure attractions
