= Hollywood Land =

Land at Disney California Adventure

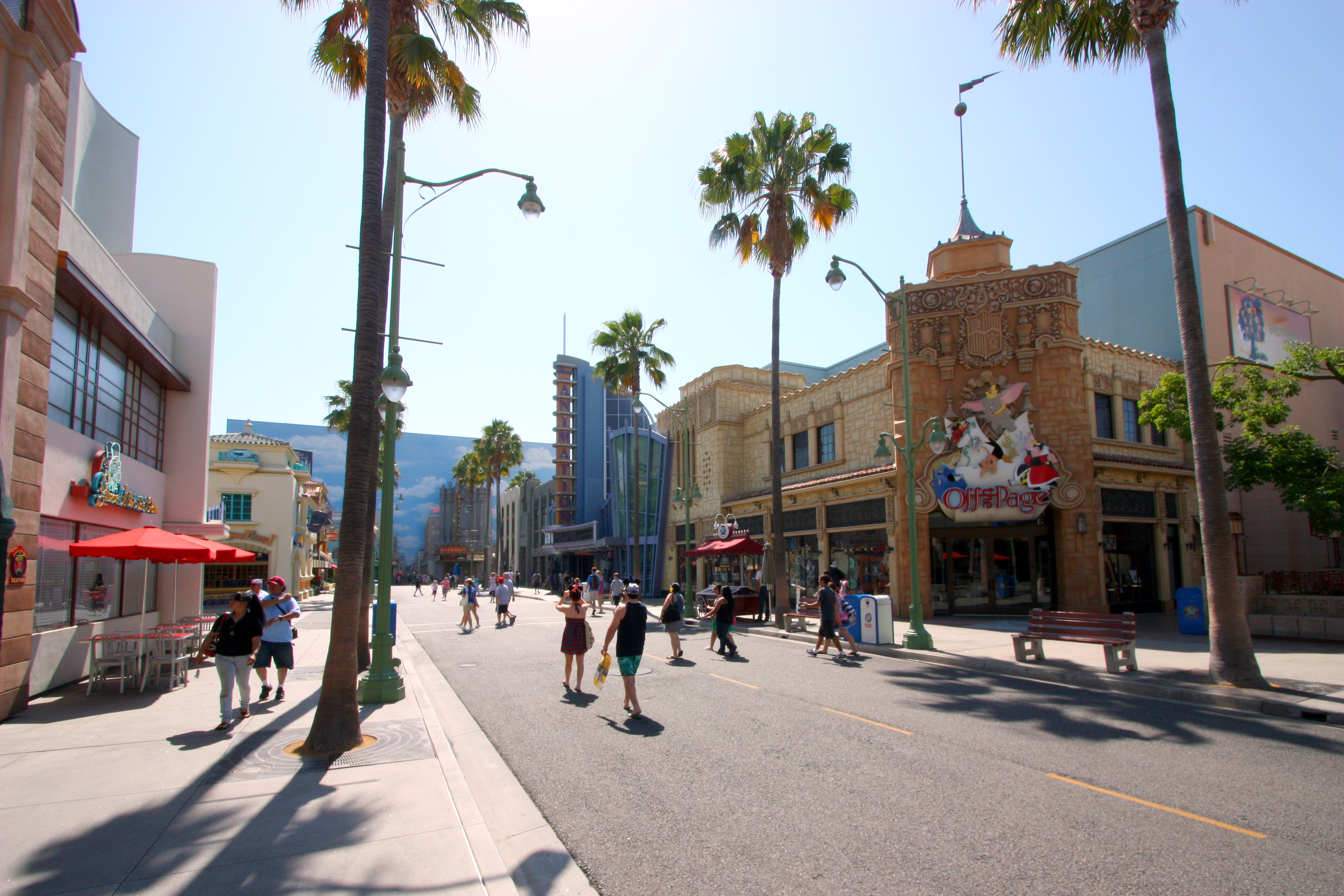
- Hollywood Boulevard, the main thoroughfare in the themed land. Photographed in 2009, before the addition of the tracks for the Red Car Trolley (2012–2025).
- Theme: 1930s Hollywood

Attractions
- Total: 4
- Other rides: 1
- Shows: 3

Disney California Adventure
- Opened: February 8, 2001

Hollywood Land is a themed land at Disney California Adventure park at the Disneyland Resort in Anaheim, California. The area is inspired by the 1930s Golden Age period of Hollywood and hosts attractions themed to this concept, including a backlot of a typical Hollywood studio. The land opened as Hollywood Pictures Backlot with the park in 2001.

The land's entrance once had towering studio gates that featured intricately carved elephants atop massive columns. The gateway was a tribute to the spectacular epics made throughout Hollywood history, especially pioneering director D. W. Griffith's 1916 silent film Intolerance. After the park's re-design, the archway sign, elephants and columns were removed, whereas the repainted pedestals remained.

Attractions include the Hyperion Theater, which opened with the park in 2001 and has hosted five productions, the 3D film Mickey's PhilharMagic, Monsters, Inc. Mike & Sulley to the Rescue!, based on Pixar's 2001 film Monsters, Inc., which opened in 2006, and the Animation Academy. Former attractions include Muppet*Vision 3D, Disney Junior – Live on Stage! (formerly known as Playhouse Disney – Live on Stage!), The Twilight Zone Tower of Terror, Superstar Limo, and Guardians of the Galaxy – Mission: Breakout! (which is now part of the adjacent Avengers Campus).

== Background ==
Hollywood Land is a portion of the Disney California Adventure park meant to emulate a backlot set in the 1930s Golden Age of Hollywood, similar to the larger Disney's Hollywood Studios theme park in Florida that opened in 1989. Unlike Hollywood Studios and Universal Studios Hollywood, Hollywood Land was never intended to serve as a functional backlot, only a mock one. Instead, it primarily hosts a set of theaters and stages presenting varying formats, such as traditional theatre, 4D film, and live music.

Hollywood Land is located in the northeast corner of California Adventure. It is connected to Buena Vista Street, the park entrance themed to 1920s Los Angeles, giving the two lands a close relation in geography and era. The main thoroughfare in the land is Hollywood Boulevard, an avenue loosely modeled after the real street but also incorporating architectural elements from elsewhere in Los Angeles. The street leads up to the Hyperion Theater, a 1,984-seat venue that presents Broadway-style musicals. Several faux sound stages, including one housing a Monsters, Inc. dark ride and another housing the Mickey's PhilharMagic show, are adjacent to Hollywood Boulevard.

== History ==
In 1990, Disney announced plans for a Hollywood-themed land in the original Disneyland park with a scheduled opening date in 1999, as part of a series of planned changes dubbed the "Disney decade" by Michael Eisner. The proposal called for the addition to be adjacent to Tomorrowland and included a replica of the Hollywood Sign, a duplicate of The Great Movie Ride from Disney's Hollywood Studios in Florida, and two new rides based on Baby Herman from Who Framed Roger Rabbit and comic book character Dick Tracy. However, Disney shelved the idea in 1991 because the company believed that its construction at the same time as the proposed WestCOT theme park would hamper the park experience for visitors; plans for WestCOT were ultimately canceled in 1995.

In 1995, Disney executives devised an idea for a California-themed park as a replacement for WestCOT, believing that it would deter tourists from going to see other attractions in the state and thus spending more time on the property. As such, the shelved Hollywood land concept was revisited as a facet of the new proposal. In June 1996, the Los Angeles Times reported details of the planned park, mentioning the inclusion of a Golden Age Hollywood backlot-themed section. The construction of California Adventure began on January 22, 1998. Information about Hollywood Land was included in four different park preview centers and online Disney promotions promised "glitzy cafés and shops, famous theaters and a real studio backlot." The original name for the land, Hollywood Pictures Backlot, was revealed in 2000. The backlot, along with all of California Adventure, opened on February 8, 2001.

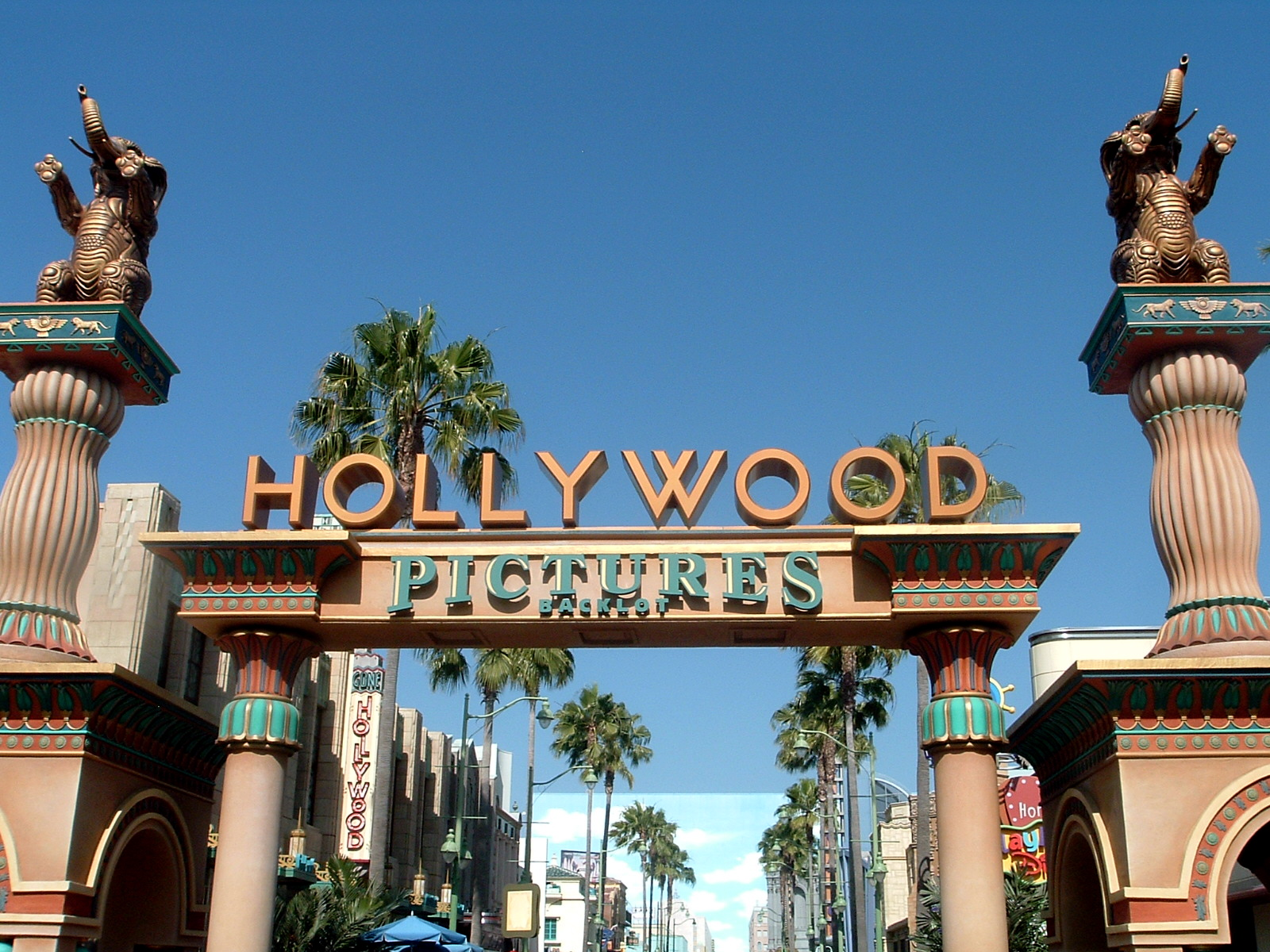
The original entrance, featuring replica elephant statues from the 1916 film Intolerance.

The original rendition of Hollywood Pictures Backlot featured an entrance gate with replicas of the elephant statues from the 1916 D. W. Griffith film Intolerance that were incorporated into the Hollywood and Highland center. The land had four inaugural attractions: The Disney Animation complex, a musical called Steps in Time at the 1,984-seat Hyperion Theater, the 3D film Muppet*Vision 3D, and a Hollywood-themed dark ride called Superstar Limo. The backlot opened with three restaurants: the ABC Soap Opera Bistro, themed to the sets of four different ABC daytime soap operas; the Award Wieners hot dog stand; and Hollywood & Dine, a food court based on four famous restaurants from Hollywood.

Upon its opening in 2001, the initial reception of California Adventure, including Hollywood Pictures Backlot and some of its attractions, was poor. The backlot, like the rest of the park, drew criticism for alleged cost-cutting. Before the end of the park's first year in existence, Steps in Time was scrapped due to poor ratings and Hollywood & Dine was closed due to a lack of customers. In September 2001, Who Wants to Be a Millionaire – Play It! was introduced as a game show attraction. In 2002, Superstar Limo became the first California Adventure attraction to permanently close due to its poor reception and the Soap Opera Bistro was closed as well. The Hyperion Theater was furnished with a version of the Broadway musical Blast! in November 2001 and was replaced with an Aladdin show in January 2003 as a long-term feature.

In 2004, the E ticket attraction The Twilight Zone Tower of Terror, an altered version of the attraction at Disney's Hollywood Studios, was opened as a new anchor for the backlot. In 2005, the area was renovated to remove some of the movie set props while introducing a new paint color scheme for the soundstages and new planter boxes. In 2006, Monsters, Inc. Mike & Sulley to the Rescue! was opened in the former Superstar Limo building.

In 2010, Disney introduced ElecTRONica, a nighttime concert event situated in the backlot that was based on the Tron franchise. The event was replaced by the Mad T Party in 2012, a similar attraction based on Tim Burton's 2010 remake film Alice in Wonderland. The Mad T Party's first stint ended in 2014 but received a second run from 2015 to 2016.

In 2012, Hollywood Pictures Backlot was reopened as Hollywood Land as part of a parkwide renovation. The sign and elephant statues were removed from the land entrance and the Red Car Trolley, a trolley part of the new Buena Vista Street, was introduced.

In 2014, Muppet*Vision 3D was closed and its theater was subsequently used for movie previews and other temporary showings. In 2016, the final showing of Aladdin took place at the Hyperion Theater. It was replaced by Frozen – Live at the Hyperion, a musical based on the 2013 feature film. In 2017, the Tower of Terror was closed to be rethemed as Guardians of the Galaxy – Mission: Breakout!, the first Disney attraction in the United States based on the Marvel Cinematic Universe. In March 2020, the Hyperion hosted its last showing of Frozen before the Disneyland Resort was closed in response to the COVID-19 pandemic – the musical did not return when the park reopened in 2021. That same year, Mission: Breakout! was reclassified as part of Avengers Campus. In 2023, the Hyperion was briefly reopened with a limited run of Rogers: The Musical. In June 2025, it was announced that Monsters, Inc. Mike & Sulley to the Rescue! would close in early 2026 to make way for an Avatar–themed land. However, in February 2026 it was announced that the closing date was delayed to 2027.

== Attractions and entertainment ==
- Disney Animation, an indoor complex with educational attractions about Disney animation
  - Animation Academy, a drawing tutorial hosted by a Disney animator
  - Character Close-Up, a meet and greet location with characters from Walt Disney Animation Studios' 2013 film Frozen
  - Sorcerer's Workshop, a workshop with drawing paper for guests to create custom zoetrope imagery
  - Turtle Talk with Crush, an interactive show, featuring Crush, a turtle from Pixar's 2003 film Finding Nemo
- The Hyperion Theater, a 1,984-seat theater presenting Broadway-style shows
- Hollywood Backlot
  - Monsters, Inc. Mike & Sulley to the Rescue!, a dark ride, based on Pixar's 2001 film Monsters, Inc.
  - The Hollywood Backlot Stage, a small stage for visiting school bands and guest entertainers
- Sunset Showcase Theater
  - Mickey's PhilharMagic, a 4D film attraction, featuring Mickey Mouse and other Disney characters as part of an orchestra
- Disney Theater
  - Disney Jr. Mickey Mouse Clubhouse Live!, an interactive stage show, inspired by Mickey Mouse Clubhouse and the revival.
  - Disney Friends Dance Party (seasonals)
  - Mickey's Trick and Treat (Opening on August 18, 2026; seasonals)

=== Former attractions and entertainment ===
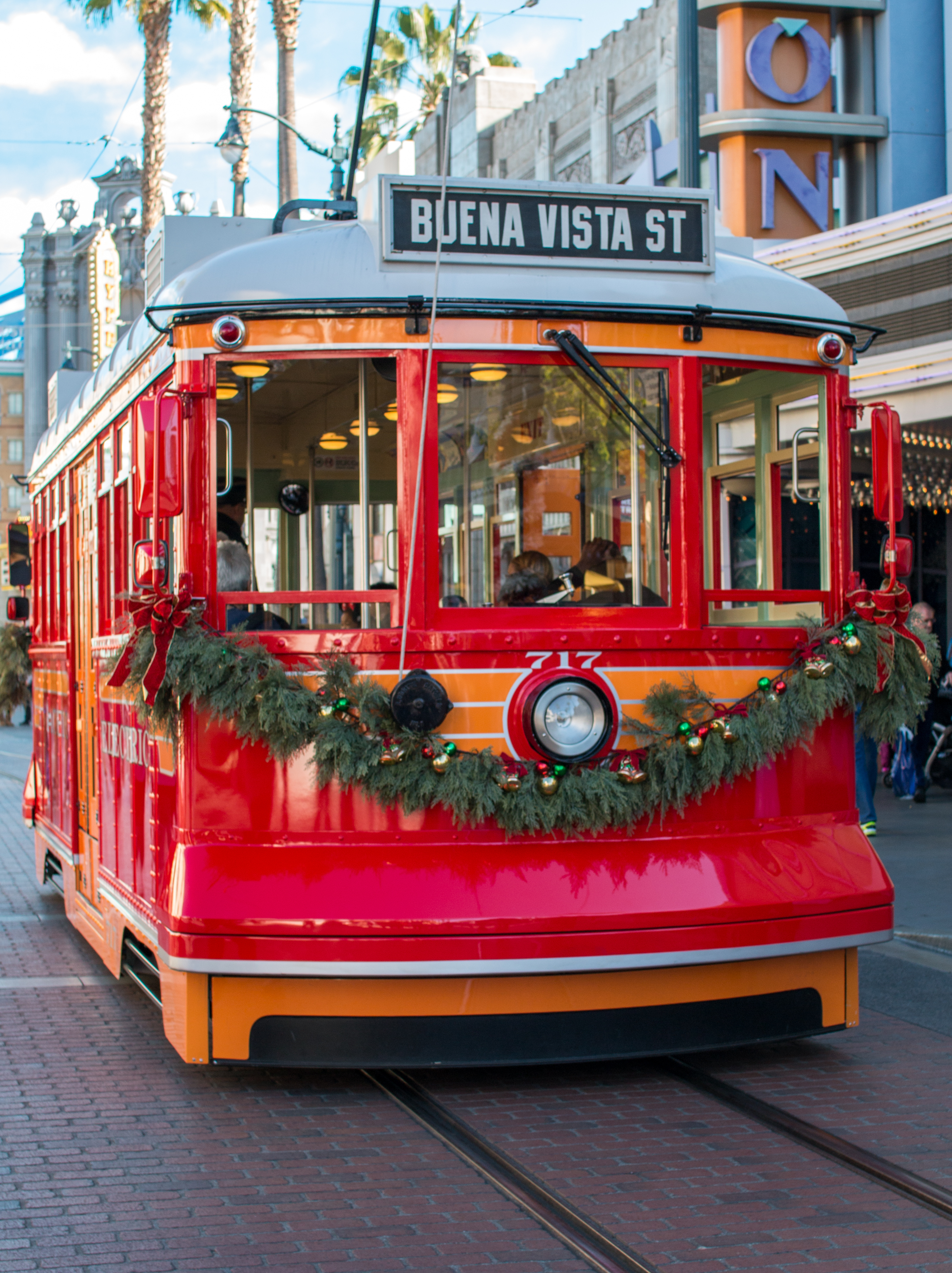
The Red Car Trolley (2012–2025) traversing Hollywood Land during the 2015 holiday season

- Disney Animation Building
  - Animation Screening Room
  - Art of Disney Animation
- Former shows at the Hyperion Theater include:
  - Steps in Time (2001), a compilation show featuring several Disney soundtracks
  - The Power of Blast (2002), a scaled-down version of the musical Blast!
  - Disney's Aladdin: A Musical Spectacular (2003–2016), a theatrical version of Disney Animation's 1992 film Aladdin
  - Frozen – Live at the Hyperion (2016–2020), a theatrical version of Disney Animation's 2013 film Frozen
  - Rogers: The Musical (2023), a limited-release show, based on the Marvel Cinematic Universe character, Captain America

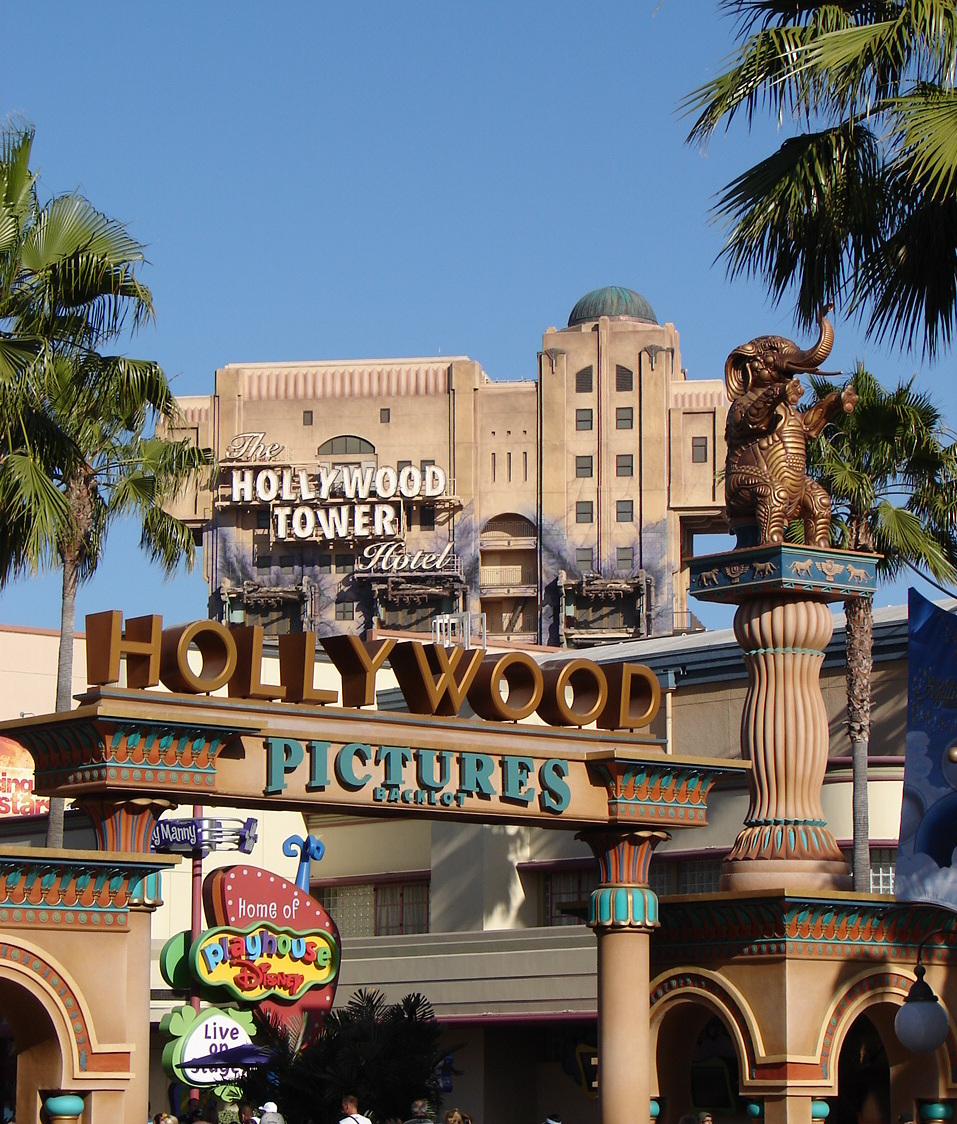
Hollywood Pictures Backlot entrance in 2008

- Former attractions at the Hollywood Backlot include:
  - Superstar Limo (2001–2002), a dark ride themed as a trip through Hollywood featuring various media personalities
- Who Wants to Be a Millionaire – Play It! (2001–2004), an interactive experience, based on the television game show of the same name
- Sunset Showcase Theater
  - Muppet*Vision 3D (2001–2014), a 3D film attraction, featuring the Muppets
  - For the First Time in Forever: A Frozen Sing-Along Celebration (2015–2016), a sing-along show, based on the 2013 feature film
- The Twilight Zone Tower of Terror (2004–2017), a drop tower ride loosely based on the 1959 horror television series The Twilight Zone
- ElecTRONica (2010–2012), a nighttime music festival coinciding with the cinematic release of Tron: Legacy
- Mad T Party (2012–2014, 2015–2016), a nighttime music festival, based on the 2010 Tim Burton film, Alice in Wonderland
- Club Pixar (2024), a nighttime music festival, based on Disney and Pixar films, during Pixar Fest
- Disney Theater
  - Disney Junior – Live on Stage! (2003–2010; 2011–2017), (formerly known as Playhouse Disney – Live on Stage!)
  - Disney Jr. Dance Party! (2017–2025), a child-oriented dance party, featuring characters from Disney Jr. television programs
- Avengers Training Initiative (2017)
- Story Time with Deadpool (2024–2025)
  - The Story Time with Deadpool Holiday Special (seasonals) (2024–2025)
- Red Car Trolley (2012–2025), a trolley based on the former Pacific Electric railway that began at Buena Vista Street and traveled through Hollywood Land

== Restaurants and refreshments ==
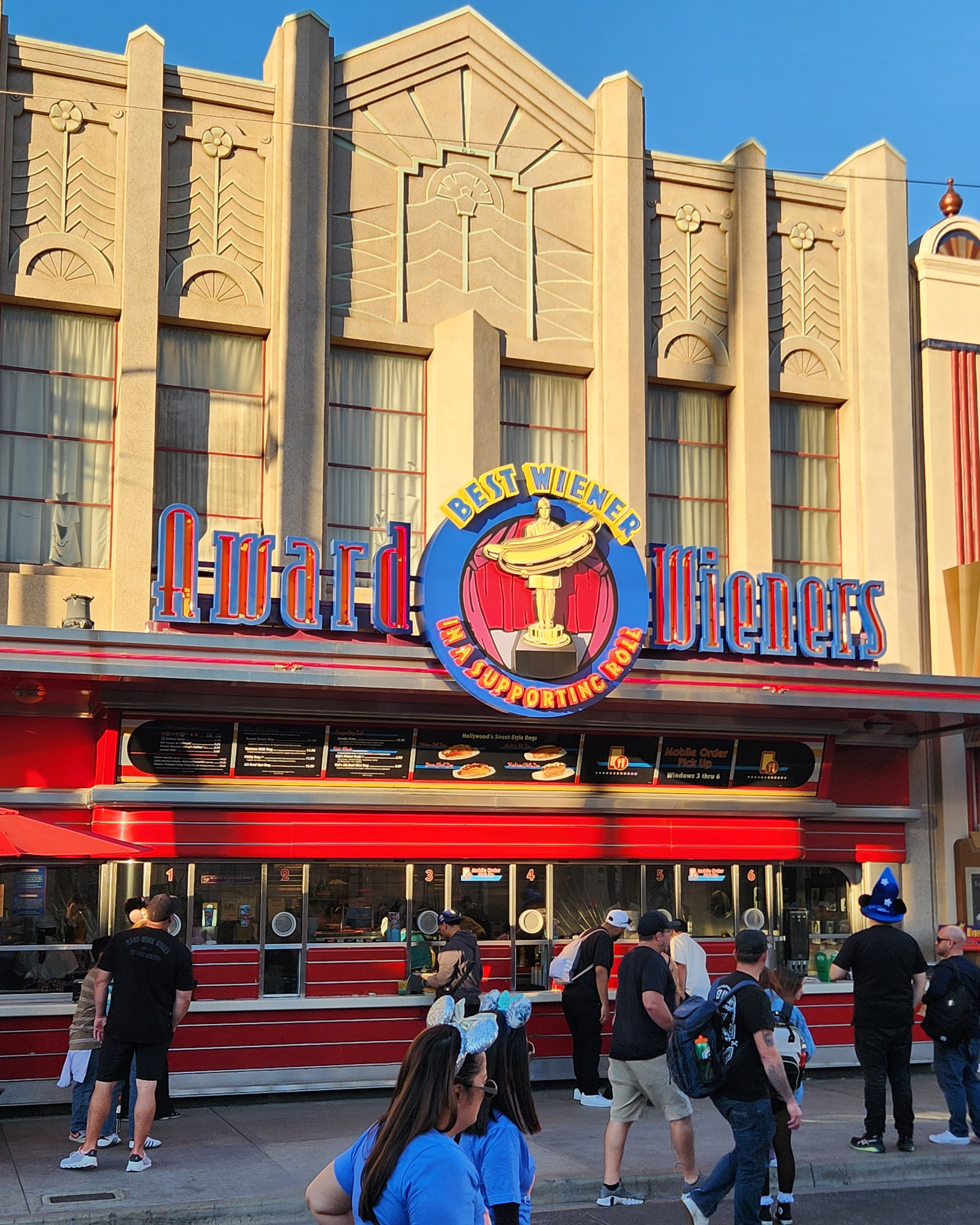
The Award Wieners hot dog stand has operated since the park's opening

- Award Wieners, a gourmet hot dog stand in operation since the park's opening
- Fairfax Market, a fruit stand in operation since the park's opening
- Hollywood Lounge, a beer garden
- Schmoozies, a smoothie, milkshake, and snack shop in operation since the park's opening
- Studio Catering Co. (formerly Between Takes), a stationary food truck with a seasonal menu

=== Former restaurants and refreshments ===
- ABC Soap Opera Bistro (2001–2002), an interactive dining experience themed to various ABC daytime soap operas: All My Children, General Hospital, One Life to Live, and Port Charles
- Hollywood & Dine (2001), a food court based on several famous Hollywood restaurants:
  - Don the Beachcomber, a Chinese food restaurant themed to the tiki bar chain created by Donn Beach
  - Schwab's Pharmacy, a sandwich shop based on the pharmacy of the same name
  - Villa Capri, a pizzeria inspired by the former Italian restaurant owned by Frank Sinatra
  - Wilshire Bowl, a hamburger and chicken sandwich restaurant named after the former nightclub on Miracle Mile
- Drink Me (2012–2014, 2015–2016), a cocktail bar temporarily established for the Mad T Party

== Shops ==
- Gone Hollywood, a general merchandise shop
- Off The Page, an exit shop at the Animation Academy with animation-related merchandise
- Studio Store, a general merchandise kiosk

=== Former Shops ===
- Rizzo's Prop & Pawn Shop (2001–2005), a kiosk selling Muppets merchandise
- Tower Hotel Gifts (2004–2017), the former exit gift shop of The Twilight Zone Tower of Terror
- Wandering Oaken's Trading Post (2015–2017), a kiosk selling Frozen merchandise
- The Collector's Warehouse, a shop in the Guardians of the Galaxy – Mission: Breakout! exit that was redesignated as part of Avengers Campus in 2021
- Backlot Premiere Shop (2020–2022), a merchandise shop inside of the sporadically-used Stage 17

=== Seasonal Entertainment ===
- Disney Festival of Holidays
  - Mickey's Happy Holidays
- Lunar New Year
  - Mulan's Lunar New Year Procession
