= Frozen – Live at the Hyperion =

Stage show at Disney California Adventure

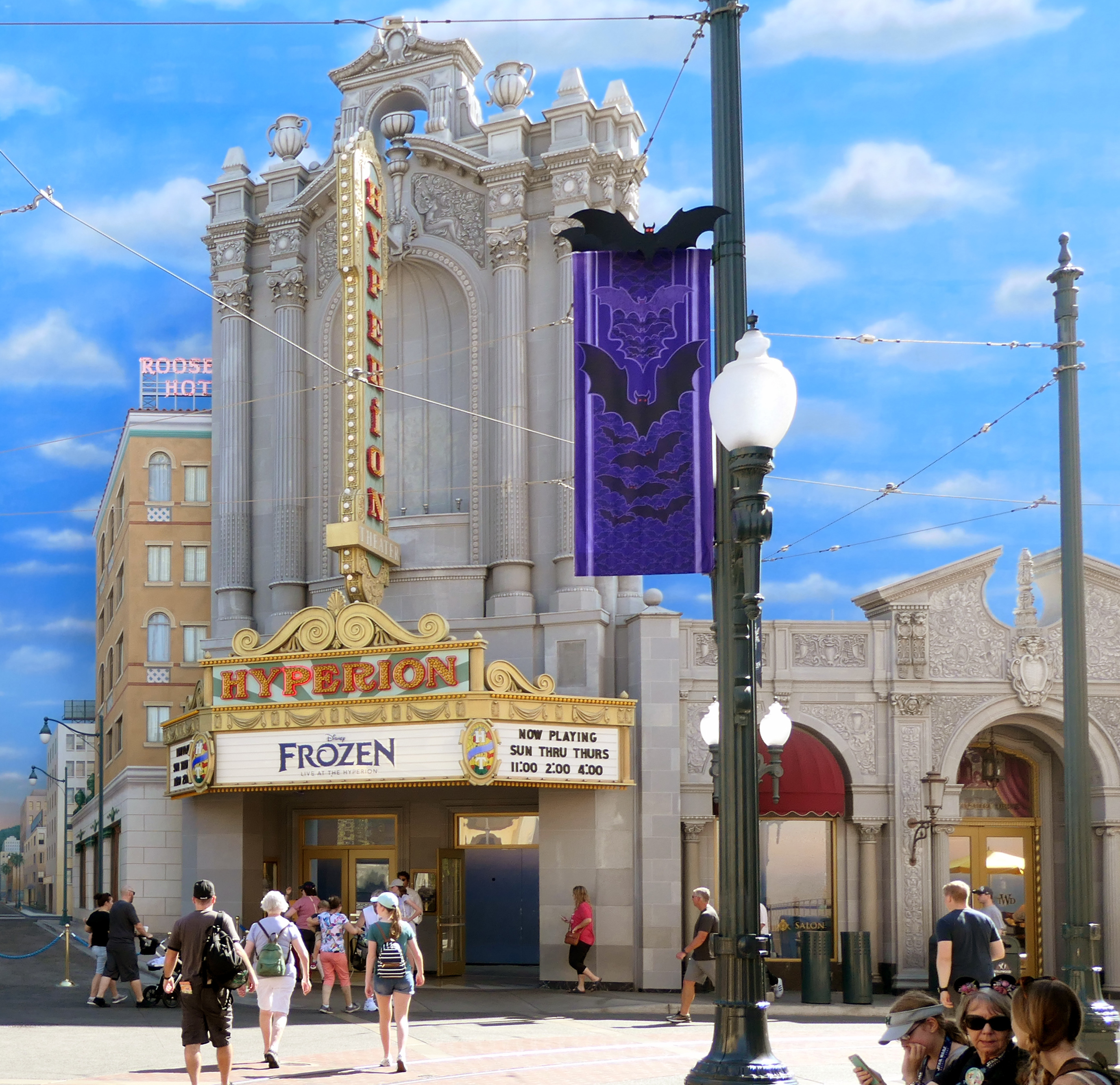
- Hyperion Theater marquee in 2019

Disney California Adventure
- Area: Hollywood Land
- Status: Closed
- Opening date: May 27, 2016
- Closing date: March 14, 2020
- Replaced: Disney's Aladdin: A Musical Spectacular

Ride statistics
- Attraction type: Musical show
- Designer: Walt Disney Creative Entertainment
- Theme: Frozen
- Music: Kristen Anderson-Lopez; Robert Lopez
- Duration: 55 minutes
- Lyrics: Kristen Anderson-Lopez; Robert Lopez
- Arrangement: Jason Michael Webb
- Wheelchair accessible
- Assistive listening available

Frozen
- Live at the Hyperion
- Music: Kristen Anderson-Lopez and Robert Lopez
- Lyrics: Kristen Anderson-Lopez and Robert Lopez
- Book: Chad Beguelin
- Basis: Disney's Frozen, by Chris Buck and Jennifer Lee
- Productions: 2016–2020, Hyperion Theater, Disney California Adventure; 2016–present, Disney Wonder

Frozen – Live at the Hyperion is a musical stage show inspired by Disney's 2013 animated film Frozen. It was presented at the Hyperion Theater in Hollywood Land at Disney California Adventure. The show premiered on May 27, 2016.

A version of the show Frozen: A Musical Spectacular premiered on board the Disney Cruise Line ship Disney Wonder on November 10, 2016.

== History ==
Frozen – Live at the Hyperion was announced on September 9, 2015, as a replacement for the venue's previous musical, Disney's Aladdin: A Musical Spectacular, which played from 2003 to 2016.

The production is directed by the Tony-nominated Liesl Tommy, written by the Tony-nominated Chad Beguelin, and features sets by the Tony-nominated scenic designer Robert Brill. Jason Michael Webb is the musical supervisor and arranger. Puppets for the show were designed by Michael Curry. About 3,500 people auditioned for the initial production, from which the production team selected a cast of over 100 to put on up to five performances daily.

== Changes ==
As part of the transformation of the Hyperion Theater to accommodate Frozen – Live at the Hyperion, the stage was rebuilt. The new additions include a 2,200 square feet (200 m^{2}) LED video wall and large curtains on either side of the stage that serve as a projection surface. The production also includes a large number of mobile sets in addition to the video elements.

Some songs like "In Summer", Love is an Open Door And For the First Time in Forever were changed to ensemble numbers. Some scenes such as Wandering Oaken's Trading Post and Sauna and characters such as Marshmallow, the ice monster were removed. For the "Let It Go" sequence, Elsa stands on top of crystal stairs that rotate out over the crowd.

== See also ==
- For the First Time in Forever: A Frozen Sing-Along Celebration
- Frozen (musical)
