= Marvel Cinematic Universe =

American superhero media franchise

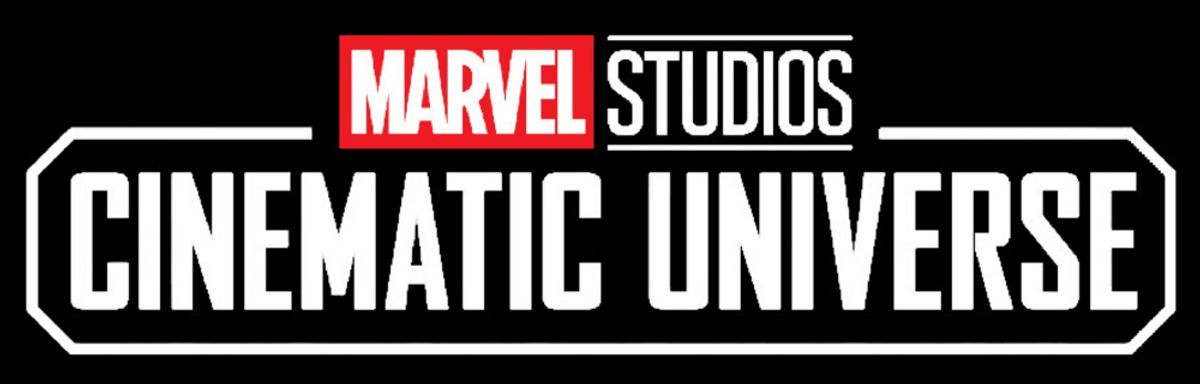
- Official logo as of 2019
- Created by: Marvel Studios
- Original work: Iron Man (2008)
- Owner: The Walt Disney Company
- Years: 2008–present
- Based on: Marvel Comics

Print publications
- Book: Marvel Cinematic Universe books
- Novel: Marvel Cinematic Universe literary material
- Comics: Marvel Cinematic Universe tie-in comics

Films and television
- Film: Marvel Cinematic Universe films
- Short film: Marvel One-Shots
- Television series: Marvel Television series; Marvel Studios series
- Web series: Marvel Cinematic Universe digital series
- Animated series: Marvel Studios Animation series
- Television special: Marvel's Special Presentations
- Television short: I Am Groot

Theatrical presentations
- Musical: Rogers: The Musical

Games
- Video game: Marvel Cinematic Universe video game tie-ins

Audio
- Original music: Music of the Marvel Cinematic Universe

Miscellaneous
- Theme park attraction: Avengers Campus
- Starring: Marvel Cinematic Universe cast members
- In-universe elements: Characters; Features; Species and races; Teams and organizations; Timeline; Multiverse

Official website
- Movies on Marvel.com; TV shows on Marvel.com

Marvel Cinematic Universe Phases
- The Infinity Saga; Phase One (2008–2012); Phase Two (2013–2015); Phase Three (2016–2019)
- The Multiverse Saga; Phase Four (2021–2022); Phase Five (2023–2025); Phase Six (2025–2027)

The Marvel Cinematic Universe (MCU) is an American media franchise and shared universe centered on a series of superhero films produced by Marvel Studios, based on characters from American comic books published by Marvel Comics. The Walt Disney Company owns the franchise, which includes television series, short films, digital series, and literature. The shared universe, much like the original Marvel Universe in comic books, was established by crossing over common plot elements, settings, cast, and characters.

Marvel Studios releases its films in groups called "Phases", with the first three phases collectively known as "The Infinity Saga" and the following three phases as "The Multiverse Saga". The first MCU film, Iron Man (2008), began Phase One, which culminated in the crossover film The Avengers (2012). Phase Two began with Iron Man 3 (2013) and concluded with Ant-Man (2015), while Phase Three began with Captain America: Civil War (2016) and concluded with Spider-Man: Far From Home (2019). Black Widow (2021) is the first film in Phase Four, which concluded with Black Panther: Wakanda Forever (2022), while Phase Five began with Ant-Man and the Wasp: Quantumania (2023) and concluded with Thunderbolts* (2025). Phase Six began with The Fantastic Four: First Steps (2025) and will conclude with Avengers: Secret Wars (2027).

Marvel Television expanded the universe to television, first on network television with Agents of S.H.I.E.L.D. on ABC in 2013 before further expanding to streaming television on Netflix and Hulu and to cable television on Freeform. They also produced the digital series Agents of S.H.I.E.L.D.: Slingshot (2016). Marvel Studios started producing its own television series for the streaming service Disney+ with WandaVision (2021), marking the beginning of Phase Four. That phase also saw the studio expand to television specials, known as Special Presentations, starting with Werewolf by Night (2022). The MCU includes various tie-in comics published by Marvel Comics, a series of direct-to-video short films called Marvel One-Shots from 2011 to 2014, and viral marketing campaigns for some films featuring the faux news programs WHIH Newsfront (2015–16) and The Daily Bugle (2019–2022).

The franchise has been commercially successful, becoming one of the highest-grossing media franchises of all time, and it has received generally positive reviews from critics. However, many of the Multiverse Saga projects performed below expectations and struggled compared to those of the Infinity Saga. The studio has attributed this to the increased amount of content produced after the 2019 film Avengers: Endgame, and began decreasing its content output by 2024. The MCU has inspired other film and television studios to attempt similar shared universes and has also inspired several themed attractions, an art exhibit, television specials, literary material, multiple tie-in video games, and commercials.

== Development ==
=== Marvel Studios films and series ===
==== The Infinity Saga films ====
By 2005, Marvel Entertainment was planning to produce its own films independently and distribute them through Paramount Pictures. Previously, Marvel had co-produced several superhero films based on Marvel Comics with Columbia Pictures, New Line Cinema, 20th Century Fox, and others. Marvel made relatively little profit from these licensing deals and wanted to get more money out of its films while maintaining artistic control of the projects and distribution. Avi Arad, head of Marvel Entertainment's film division known as Marvel Films, was pleased with director Sam Raimi's Spider-Man film trilogy (2002–2007) at Sony Pictures and Columbia but was less enthused with some of the other films. Arad decided to form Marvel Studios, Hollywood's first major independent film studio since DreamWorks Pictures was founded in 1994. Kevin Feige, Arad's second-in-command, realized that unlike Spider-Man, Blade, and the X-Men which were respectively licensed to Sony, New Line, and Fox, Marvel owned the rights to the Avengers team. Feige, a self-described "fanboy", envisioned introducing each of the Avengers in individual films and then merging them in a crossover film as part of a shared universe, similar to the one that was created by Stan Lee and Jack Kirby for Marvel Comics in the 1960s.

"It's never been done before and that's kind of the spirit everybody's taking it in. The other filmmakers aren't used to getting actors from other movies that other filmmakers have cast, certain plot lines that are connected or certain locations that are connected, but I think... everyone was on board for it and thinks that it's fun. Primarily because we've always remained consistent saying that the movie that we are making comes first. All of the connective tissue, all of that stuff is fun and is going to be very important if you want it to be. If the fans want to look further and find connections, then they're there. There are a few big ones obviously, that hopefully the mainstream audience will [be] able to follow as well. But... the reason that all the filmmakers are on board is that their movies need to stand on their own. They need to have a fresh vision, a unique tone, and the fact that they can interconnect if you want to follow those breadcrumbs is a bonus."

— Marvel Studios president Kevin Feige on constructing a shared film universe

To raise capital, the studio secured funding from a seven-year, $525 million revolving credit facility with Merrill Lynch. Arad, who resigned in 2006, doubted the shared universe strategy would work. He insisted that his reputation helped secure the initial financing. In 2007, Feige was named studio chief and president. To preserve its artistic integrity, Marvel Studios formed a creative committee of six people familiar with its comic book lore: Feige, Marvel Studios co-president Louis D'Esposito, Marvel Comics' president of publishing Dan Buckley, Marvel Entertainment's chief creative officer Joe Quesada, comic book writer Brian Michael Bendis, and Marvel Entertainment president Alan Fine, who oversaw the committee. Feige initially referred to the shared narrative continuity of the films as the "Marvel Cinema Universe", but later used the term "Marvel Cinematic Universe". Since the franchise expanded to other media, some have used this phrase to only refer to the feature films.

The MCU films are released in groups called "Phases", beginning with Phase One (2008–2012) and Phase Two (2013–2015). In December 2009, the Walt Disney Company purchased Marvel Entertainment for $4 billion. Disney said it would distribute future Marvel Studios films through its own studio once the prior deal with Paramount expired. The films of Phase Three (2016–2019) were announced at a special press event in October 2014. By September 2015, Marvel Studios was integrated into Walt Disney Studios. Feige was reporting to Walt Disney Studios chairman Alan F. Horn instead of Marvel Entertainment CEO Isaac Perlmutter, and the creative committee began having only "nominal" input on the films. They continued to consult on Marvel Television productions, which remained under Perlmutter's control. All key film decisions moving forward were to be made by Feige, D'Esposito, and executive vice president Victoria Alonso. The studio went on to establish the Marvel Studios Parliament, a "brain trust" of long-time executives at the company who help to elevate each other's projects where possible. In November 2017, Feige said the Phase Three crossover films Avengers: Infinity War (2018) and Avengers: Endgame (2019) would provide a definitive conclusion to the films thus far and begin a new period for the franchise. He later said Phases One, Two, and Three were collectively known as "The Infinity Saga".

==== The Multiverse Saga films and series ====
Disney reportedly began developing a Marvel-based television series for its new streaming service Disney+ by November 2017. In July 2018, Feige said discussions had begun with Disney about Marvel Studios' potential involvement with the streaming service, which he felt was important for the wider company. In September 2018, Marvel Studios was reported to be developing several limited series centered on "second-tier" characters from the MCU films who had not and were unlikely to headline their own films, with Feige taking a "hands-on role" in each series' development. He said they would tell stories that could not be told with a feature film, and being asked by Disney to create these series had "energized everyone creatively" within Marvel Studios, since they "could play in a new medium and throw the rules out the window in terms of structure and format". Television specials from the studio are known as Special Presentations; The Guardians of the Galaxy Holiday Special (2022) was the first project Marvel Studios began planning for Disney+.

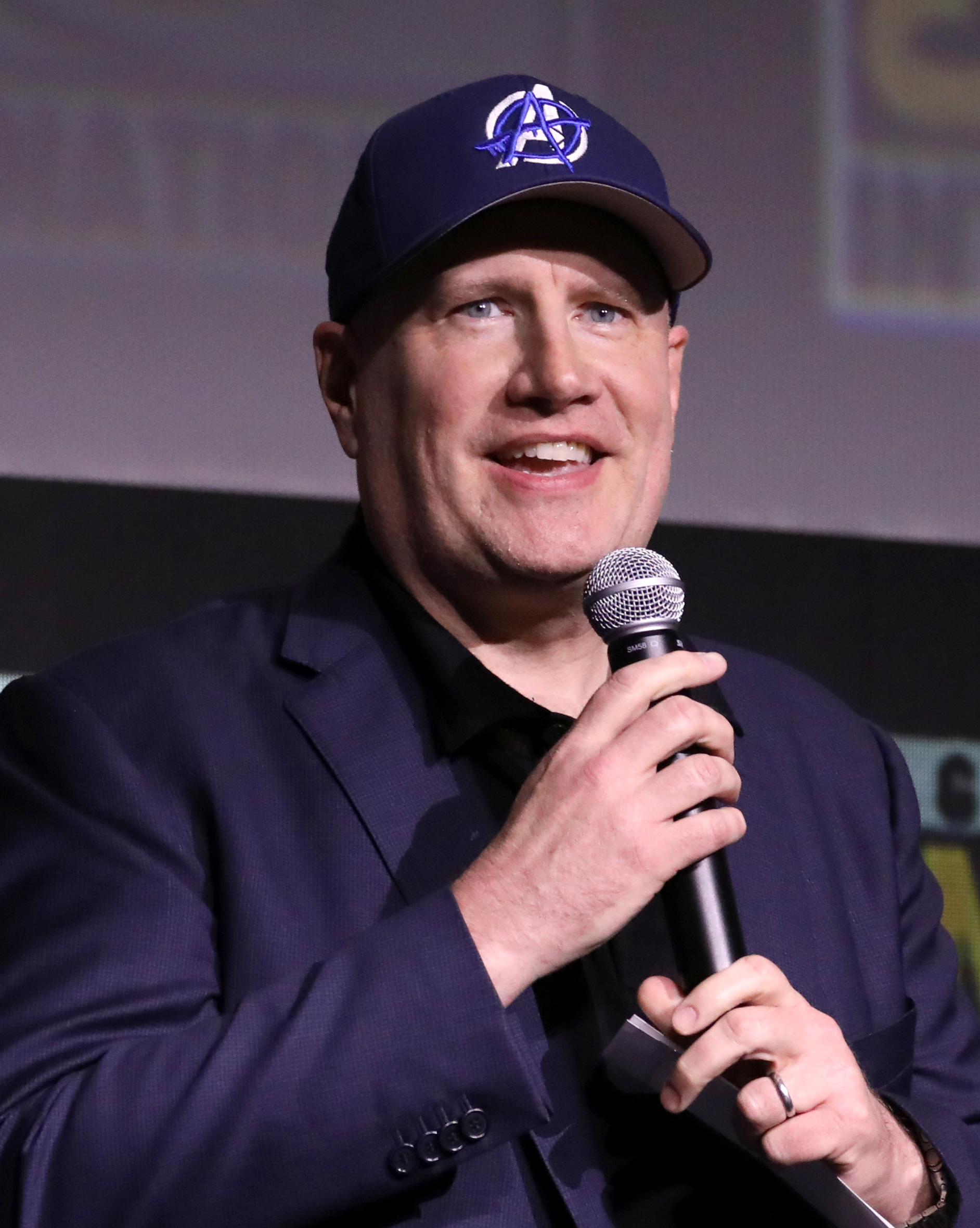
Marvel Studios president Kevin Feige helped conceive a shared media universe of Marvel properties.

In July 2019, Feige announced the Phase Four (2021–2022) slate of films and series at San Diego Comic-Con (SDCC), including the animated series What If...? (2021–2024). By July 2021, the studio was creating an "animation branch and mini studio", known as Marvel Studios Animation, to focus on more animated content. Alonso said Marvel had around 31 projects in various stages of development by September 2021. In April 2022, Feige said he and Marvel Studios were on a creative retreat to plan and discuss the MCU films for the following 10 years. Following comments that there was no clear plan for the franchise in Phase Four compared to the Infinity Saga, Feige announced at SDCC in July 2022 that Phases Four, Five (2023–2025), and Six (2025–2027) would collectively be known as "The Multiverse Saga", and would culminate in the films Avengers: The Kang Dynasty and Avengers: Secret Wars (2027). Marvel Studios decided to not have an Avengers crossover film in each phase due to the large expansion in the number of MCU projects in a short amount of time, and after the "creative experience" of ending the Infinity Saga with Infinity War and Endgame. The studio was excited to explore Kang the Conqueror as an overarching villain of the Multiverse Saga after Thanos in the Infinity Saga, because Kang was a different villain in part due to his multiple alternate universe variants from different timelines within the multiverse. The studio did not initially plan to build the next saga around Kang, and made that decision after seeing actor Jonathan Majors's performance in the first season of the Disney+ series Loki (2021) and the film Ant-Man and the Wasp: Quantumania (2023).

Alonso was fired from her role at Marvel Studios in March 2023, allegedly due to her work with a competing studio, although she disputed this and claimed she was being "silenced" over the censoring of gay pride elements in Quantumania; Disney and Alonso reached a multi-million dollar compensation settlement in April. In July, Disney CEO Bob Iger said the company would be reducing the amount of content from Marvel Studios after several underachieving films at the box office, admitting that the expansion into Disney+ series and more films had "diluted focus and attention". He clarified in May 2024 that Disney would now release two, or at most three, Marvel films and two Marvel series a year. This was a decrease from up to four films and around four series in some recent years. The company was reducing output and focusing on quality across all its divisions, but Iger felt the change was especially needed for Marvel. Feige and D'Esposito said 2023 had been a particularly difficult year for the studio but they had learned their lesson on trying to make too much content at once. They said that no longer being "on top" of the box office allowed them to be underdogs again, as they were when they began work on Phase One, and they would be "coming back strong" with the hope of exceeding expectations. In 2024, Marvel Studios introduced the "Marvel Animation" and "Marvel Television" banners for their animated and live-action series, respectively. This was done, along with the previously established Marvel Spotlight banner, to indicate to audiences that they did not have to watch all of the studio's projects to understand the overall story and could choose which storylines and characters to follow. In July 2025, Feige said the studio reduced the budgets of its 2024 and 2025 films to be a third lower than those for 2022 and 2023.

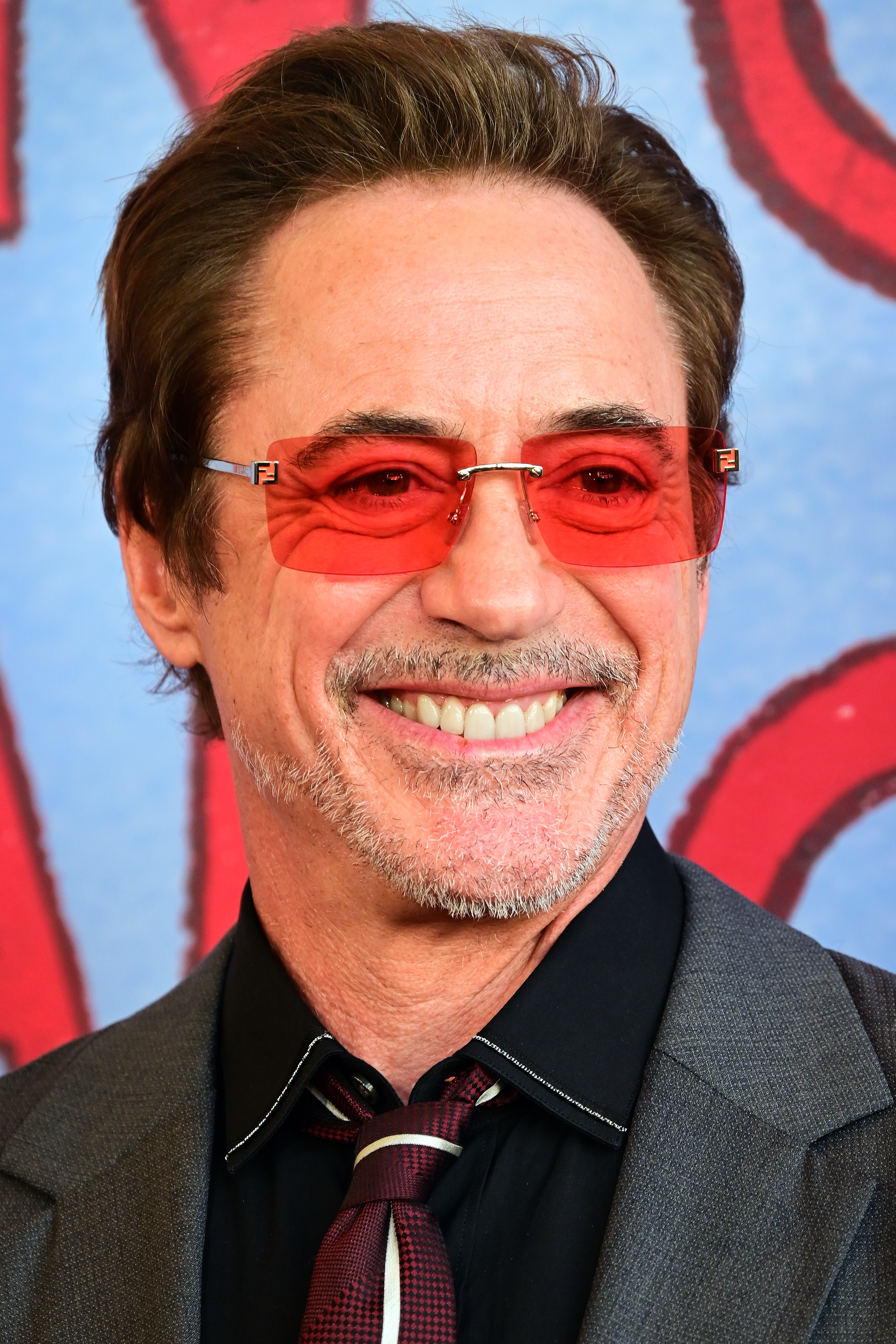
After Robert Downey Jr. starred as the superhero Tony Stark / Iron Man in the Infinity Saga, he was subsequently cast as Victor von Doom / Doctor Doom, the antagonist of the Multiverse Saga.

After Majors was found guilty of assault and harassment amidst legal issues in December 2023, he was fired by Disney and Marvel Studios. At that time, Marvel was internally referring to The Kang Dynasty as Avengers 5; by early 2024, Marvel had decided to drop the Kang storyline and began searching for a new antagonist for the saga. At SDCC in July 2024, the fifth Avengers film was retitled Avengers: Doomsday (2026), with Robert Downey Jr.—who starred as the superhero Tony Stark / Iron Man in the Infinity Saga—cast as the Multiverse Saga's new antagonist Victor von Doom / Doctor Doom, for both Doomsday and Secret Wars.

====== Integration of 21st Century Fox characters ======
In December 2017, Disney agreed to acquire assets from 21st Century Fox, and finalized the transaction in March 2019. This saw the return of the film rights for the X-Men, Deadpool, and the Fantastic Four to Marvel Studios. Despite this, Feige said they could not yet immediately integrate these characters and concepts into the MCU because of corporate acquisition laws. Some of the first elements to be integrated into the MCU following the acquisition were the organization S.W.O.R.D. in the Disney+ series WandaVision (2021) and the fictional country Madripoor in the series The Falcon and the Winter Soldier (2021).

More elements were integrated throughout the Multiverse Saga, including Patrick Stewart appearing as an alternate version of Charles Xavier, his role in Fox's X-Men film series, in the film Doctor Strange in the Multiverse of Madness (2022); "No Normal", the series finale of the miniseries Ms. Marvel (2022), revealing that Kamala Khan has a genetic mutation, with star Iman Vellani confirming that Kamala is the first mutant in the MCU; and Kelsey Grammer playing a version of his X-Men film series character Hank McCoy / Beast in the film The Marvels (2023). The film Deadpool & Wolverine (2024) features many returning characters and actors, including Ryan Reynolds as Wade Wilson / Deadpool, Hugh Jackman as a version of Logan / Wolverine, and Chris Evans—who starred as Steve Rogers / Captain America in the Infinity Saga—as Johnny Storm / Human Torch, reprising his role from Fox's Fantastic Four duology (2005–2007). Feige said Deadpool & Wolverine was the true start to Marvel Studios' use of the Fox characters, and began the MCU's "Mutant era". He said Fox characters would continue to appear through Doomsday and Secret Wars, which would introduce a "new age of mutants and of the X-Men" as part of a reported ten-year plan for the characters. Feige added that one of Marvel's goals for the crossover films was to give closure to storylines that pre-dated the MCU, including those of the Fox X-Men characters, before Secret Wars introduced a recast X-Men team. Doomsday sees additional X-Men film series actors reprising their roles: Ian McKellen (Erik Lehnsherr / Magneto), Alan Cumming (Kurt Wagner / Nightcrawler), Rebecca Romijn (Raven Darkhölme / Mystique), and James Marsden (Scott Summers / Cyclops).

The Phase Six film The Fantastic Four: First Steps (2025) introduces Pedro Pascal, Vanessa Kirby, Ebon Moss-Bachrach, and Joseph Quinn as a new version of the Fantastic Four for the MCU. Sadie Sink is introduced as a new version of Jean Grey in Spider-Man: Brand New Day (2026), with that film also featuring Bill Metzger, a radical anti-mutant activist in the comics; and a universal inhibitor that subdues mutant abilities.

==== The Mutant Saga ====
In July 2025, Feige said Marvel Studios was "already well into development" on the three phases of their next saga following the conclusion of the Multiverse Saga with Secret Wars. He said Phase Seven would be "directly impacted" by the films of Phase Six. By that point, Sacha Baron Cohen's Mephisto was being viewed as the next "prominent" villain of the MCU. A year later, Feige said Secret Wars would "establish a streamlined, simplified, single universe that audiences can keep up with. Some things will be familiar, but many, many things will be entirely new." He said the X-Men would be core to the next era of the MCU, which he called the "Mutant Saga", and noted that those characters have their own universe and "multi-stage saga" in the comics.

=== Marvel Television series ===
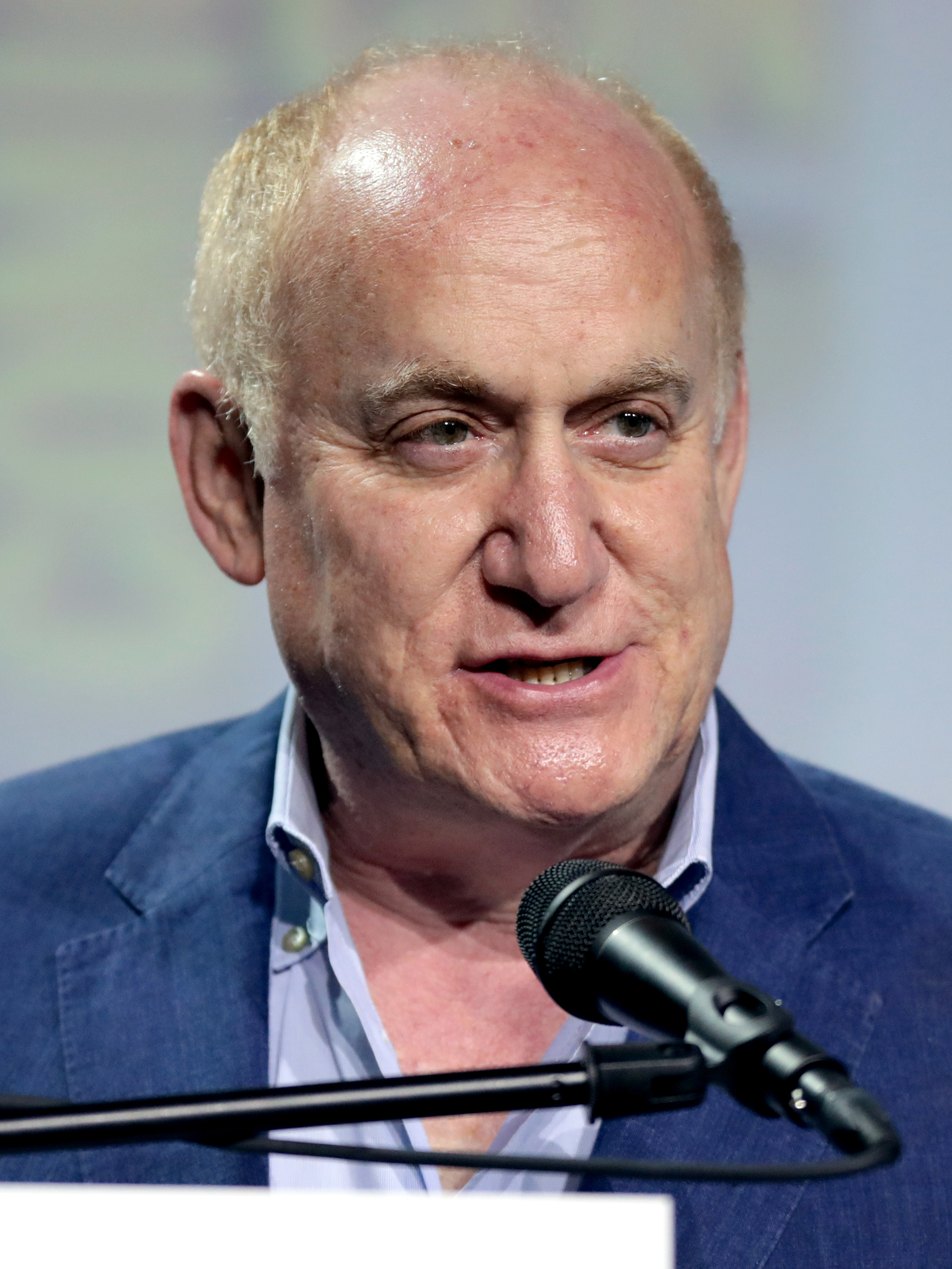
Jeph Loeb led Marvel Television and served as executive producer of every television series on ABC, Netflix, Hulu, and Freeform.

Marvel Television was launched in June 2010 with writer and producer Jeph Loeb as its head, and had entered into discussions with ABC to create a show set in the MCU by July 2012; the network went on to release Agents of S.H.I.E.L.D., Agent Carter, and Inhumans. The latter was a co-production with IMAX Corporation. In November 2013, Disney was set to provide Netflix with the live-action series Daredevil, Jessica Jones, Luke Cage, and Iron Fist, building up to the crossover miniseries The Defenders. In April 2016, Netflix ordered The Punisher, a spin-off of Daredevil. By February 2019, Netflix had canceled all of its Marvel series. In April 2016, the Disney-owned cable network Freeform announced Cloak & Dagger. In May 2017, Marvel announced that Runaways had received a series order from Hulu. In May 2019, Marvel announced that Helstrom had been greenlit for Hulu.

In October 2019, further corporate restructuring saw Feige named Chief Creative Officer of Marvel Entertainment, with Marvel Television becoming part of Marvel Studios and executives of Marvel Television reporting to Feige. In December 2019, Marvel Television was folded into Marvel Studios, with Marvel Studios taking over production of the remaining series. No further series were expected to be developed by Marvel Television. In January 2021, Feige said "never say never" to potentially reviving the Netflix series, but noted that Marvel Studios was focused on their new Disney+ series. In May 2022, Marvel Studios was revealed to be developing a new Daredevil series for Disney+, which was announced in July as Daredevil: Born Again.

=== Expansion to other media ===
The first comic book tie-in to the MCU was released in 2008. Quesada explained that these comics would be set within the continuity of the films, but were not intended to be direct adaptations. Rather, they would explore "something that happened off screen" or flesh out something briefly mentioned. Feige was involved with the creation of the comics, with the film's screenwriters sometimes as well. Marvel Comics worked with Brad Winderbaum, Jeremy Latcham, and Will Corona Pilgrim at Marvel Studios to decide which concepts would be carried over from the Marvel Comics Universe to the Marvel Cinematic Universe, what to show in the tie-in comics, and what to leave for the films. Marvel later clarified which of the tie-in comics are considered canonical MCU stories, with the rest being merely inspired by the MCU "where we get to show off all the characters from the film in costume and in comic form".

In August 2011, Marvel announced a series of direct-to-video short films called Marvel One-Shots. The name was derived from the label used by Marvel Comics for their one-shot comics. Winderbaum said the shorts were "a fun way to experiment with new characters and ideas" and to expand the MCU. Each short was designed to be a self-contained story that provided more backstory for characters or events introduced in the films.

In March 2015, Marvel's vice president of animation development and production, Cort Lane, said animated tie-ins to the MCU were "in the works". That July, Marvel Studios partnered with Google to produce the faux news program WHIH Newsfront with Christine Everhart, a series of in-universe YouTube videos serving as the center of a viral marketing campaign to promote the films and universe. In December 2016, a six-part web series, Agents of S.H.I.E.L.D.: Slingshot, debuted on ABC.com. It follows Elena "Yo-Yo" Rodriguez on a secret mission, shortly before the start of Agents of S.H.I.E.L.D.'s fourth season, with Natalia Cordova-Buckley reprising her role from the series. In September 2019, Sony created a real version of the fictional The Daily Bugle website as part of a viral marketing campaign to promote the home media release of Spider-Man: Far From Home (2019). Inspired by real-world "conspiracy-pushing" websites such as Alex Jones's InfoWars, the website features J. K. Simmons reprising his role as J. Jonah Jameson in a video where he speaks out against Spider-Man before asking viewers to "like and subscribe". In December 2020, Marvel Studios announced I Am Groot, a series of photorealistic animated shorts starring Baby Groot for Disney+.

=== Business practices ===
In November 2016, Feige explained that the studio would often put together a "lookbook" of influences from the comics and art by Marvel's visual development department to create a visual template for a project. The studio compiled these at company retreats held approximately every 18 months to plan out future projects and develop the phases of the MCU. However, Marvel sometimes opted not to show these lookbooks to directors so they could offer their own ideas first. When selecting a director for a project, Marvel Studios looks for filmmakers to hire who can guide a film. Some of their director choices have been considered "out-of-left-field" based on those directors' previous work. On this, Feige remarked that "you don't have to have directed a big, giant visual-effects movie to do a big, giant visual-effects movie for us. You just have to have done something singularly sort of awesome."

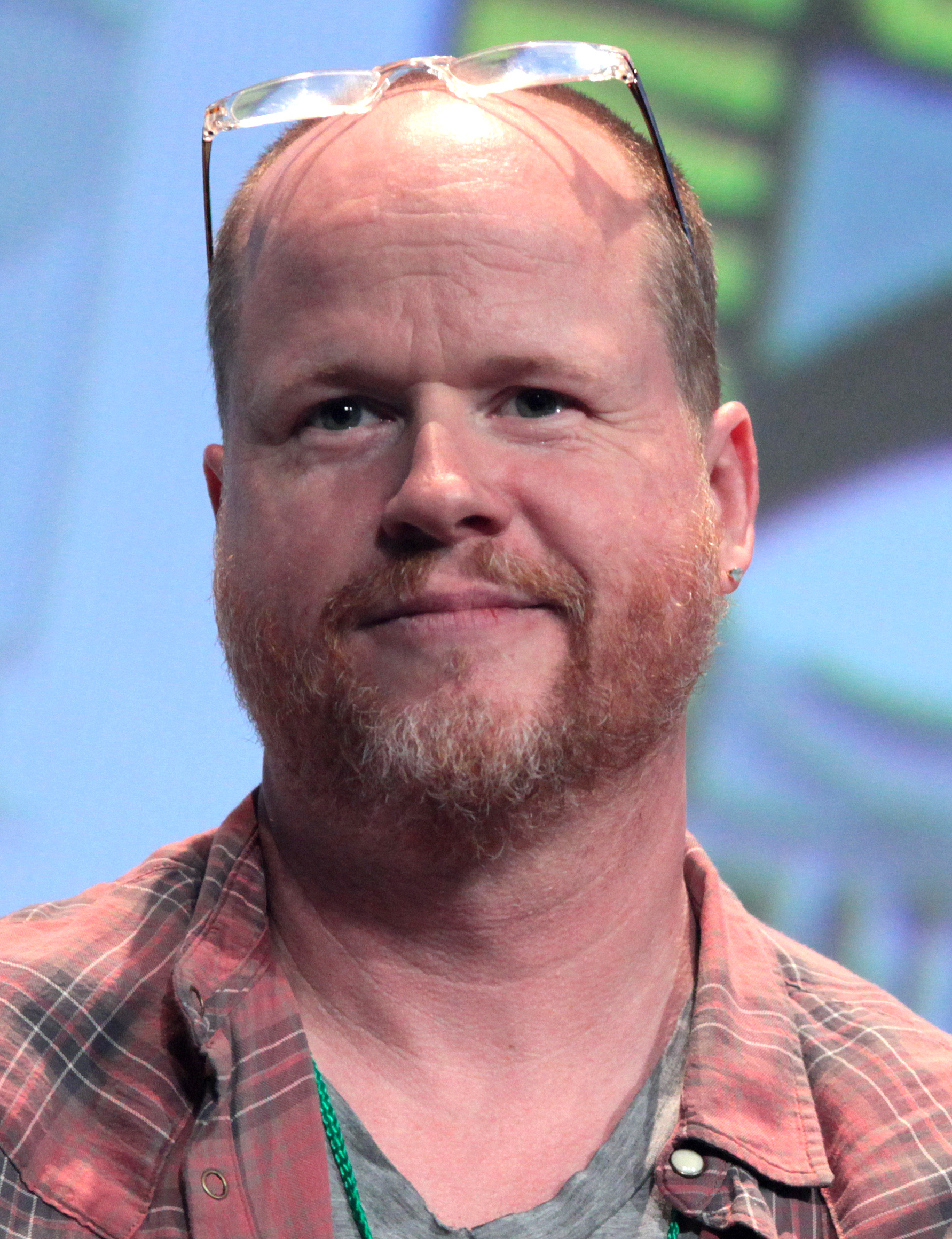
Joss Whedon was a significant contributor to the MCU's Phase Two: he offered creative insight to all of the films; launched the first MCU television series, Agents of S.H.I.E.L.D.; and wrote and directed the crossover film Avengers: Age of Ultron.

The studio ensures directors are open to the idea of the shared universe and are willing to include connective material, such as Kenneth Branagh and Joe Johnston needing to include scenes that set up The Avengers (2012) in their respective Phase One films Thor and Captain America: The First Avenger (both 2011). Marvel Studios usually has a big idea they would like to explore or build to in a project, such as Hydra infiltrating S.H.I.E.L.D. in Captain America: The Winter Soldier (2014), but they leave it up to the filmmakers to interpret and "improv a little bit" to get that point. After developing these ideas, the creative team starts exploring ideas from other future projects to see how to make any larger universe connections. For many of their early films, Feige was closely involved in development before allowing filming to be overseen by lower-level studio executives. Feige would then become involved again during editing, when films could be entirely rewritten or reworked. Feige described the company's approach as "plus-ing at every turn", where they are always trying to improve a project and include new suggestions rather than sticking to a set script. Feige said they would not start a film without a full script, but he was never satisfied with their scripts or finished films and always felt they could do better.

In August 2012, Marvel signed The Avengers and Avengers: Age of Ultron (2015) director Joss Whedon to an exclusive film and television contract through June 2015. With the deal, Whedon contributed creatively to all of the Phase Two films and also developed Agents of S.H.I.E.L.D., the first television series set in the MCU. In April 2017, Guardians of the Galaxy (2014) and Guardians of the Galaxy Vol. 2 (2017) writer and director James Gunn revealed that he would be working with Marvel to help plan future stories for the Guardians of the Galaxy characters and the wider "Marvel Cosmic Universe", however, Gunn became the co-CEO of DC Studios in November 2022 and signed a four-year deal to work exclusively on DC Comics-based projects. For Phase Three, there was a large amount of collaboration between the filmmakers of the individual character films and the filmmakers of the crossover films Avengers: Infinity War and Avengers: Endgame, which were directed by the Russo brothers and written by Christopher Markus and Stephen McFeely. This was to ensure their storytelling aligned for the Infinity Saga's culmination.

Marvel Studios began contracting their actors for multiple films, including signing actor Samuel L. Jackson to a then-unprecedented nine-film contract. Feige said the studio had all actors sign contracts for multiple films, with the normal number being three or more, while the nine- or twelve-film deals were rare. The actors' contracts also feature clauses that allow Marvel to use up to three minutes of an actor's performance from one film in another, which Marvel describes as "bridging material". By the start of Phase Four, Marvel Studios was no longer contracting actors for a large number of projects, with deal lengths varying for each actor and project. Feige said the studio was looking for actors who were excited to join the franchise and appear in multiple projects without being locked into contractual obligations. He also noted that they were starting to include theme park attractions in actors' deals. By December 2020, because of the impact COVID-19 had on theaters and film studios shifting away from theatrical releases, Marvel Studios began exploring updated contracts for actors, writers, directors, and producers to receive adjusted compensation in the event a film had to debut on Disney+ instead of in theaters. TheWrap reported that the new contracts would likely only apply to films about to enter production.

For Marvel Television, Loeb said he and his executives were involved in all aspects of production: "whether it's being in the writers' room, editing, on set, casting—every step of the production goes through the Marvel team to tell the best story that we can". He said the studio was able to work on so many series across different networks and platforms because all they needed was one person working on each series to help "guide the process". When developing the crossover miniseries The Defenders, showrunner Marco Ramirez consulted with the creators of all the individual Marvel Netflix series, having them read each of the scripts for The Defenders and provide insight into individual characters' worlds. Actors appearing in Marvel Television series, such as Charlie Cox (who portrayed Matt Murdock / Daredevil in Daredevil) and Adrianne Palicki (Bobbi Morse / Mockingbird in Agents of S.H.I.E.L.D.), were contractually obliged to appear in a Marvel Studios film if asked. In December 2021, Feige confirmed that Cox would reprise the role of Daredevil in Marvel Studios MCU productions, with Cox first reprising the role in the film Spider-Man: No Way Home (2021). Additionally, Vincent D'Onofrio first reprised his role as Wilson Fisk / Kingpin from Daredevil in the Disney+ series Hawkeye (2021).

== Feature films ==
Marvel Studios releases its films in groups called "Phases", with three phases making up a "Saga".

=== The Infinity Saga ===
The first three phases are collectively known as "The Infinity Saga". Phase One consists of Iron Man (2008), The Incredible Hulk (2008), Iron Man 2 (2010), Thor (2011), and Captain America: The First Avenger (2011), and concludes with the crossover film The Avengers (2012). Phase Two comprises Iron Man 3 (2013), Thor: The Dark World (2013), Captain America: The Winter Soldier (2014), Guardians of the Galaxy (2014), Avengers: Age of Ultron (2015), and Ant-Man (2015). Captain America: Civil War (2016) is the first film of Phase Three, and is followed by Doctor Strange (2016), Guardians of the Galaxy Vol. 2 (2017), Spider-Man: Homecoming (2017), Thor: Ragnarok (2017), Black Panther (2018), Avengers: Infinity War (2018), Ant-Man and the Wasp (2018), Captain Marvel (2019), Avengers: Endgame (2019), and Spider-Man: Far From Home (2019).

=== The Multiverse Saga ===
The second three phases are collectively known as "The Multiverse Saga", and also include television series and specials on Disney+. Phase Four includes Black Widow (2021), Shang-Chi and the Legend of the Ten Rings (2021), Eternals (2021), Spider-Man: No Way Home (2021), Doctor Strange in the Multiverse of Madness (2022), Thor: Love and Thunder (2022), and Black Panther: Wakanda Forever (2022). Phase Five includes Ant-Man and the Wasp: Quantumania (2023), Guardians of the Galaxy Vol. 3 (2023), The Marvels (2023), Deadpool & Wolverine (2024), Captain America: Brave New World (2025), and Thunderbolts* (2025). Phase Six includes The Fantastic Four: First Steps (2025), Spider-Man: Brand New Day (2026), Avengers: Doomsday (2026), and Avengers: Secret Wars (2027).

=== The Mutant Saga ===
The next MCU saga is expected to center on characters that Marvel Studios inherited during the acquisition of 21st Century Fox by Disney, including the X-Men. Feige reportedly had a 10-year plan for the X-Men in the MCU by May 2025, and he has referred to the next saga as the "Mutant Saga". Films expected to be part of Phase Seven, the saga's first phase, include an untitled X-Men film (2028), Ghost Rider (2028), and Black Panther III (2028).

== Television series ==
=== Marvel Television ===
Marvel Television produced multiple television series set in the MCU across broadcast, streaming, and cable. Its ABC series included Agents of S.H.I.E.L.D. (2013–2020), Agent Carter (2015–2016), and Inhumans (2017); its Netflix series included Daredevil (2015–2018), Jessica Jones (2015–2019), Luke Cage (2016–2018), Iron Fist (2017–2018), the crossover miniseries The Defenders (2017), and The Punisher (2017–2019); its young adult series included Runaways (2017–2019) streaming on Hulu and Cloak & Dagger (2018–2019) airing on Freeform; and the Hulu series Helstrom (2020) was originally intended to be the start of a planned "Adventure into Fear" franchise, but was ultimately "not tied to the MCU", according to showrunner Paul Zbyszewski.

=== Marvel Studios ===
Beginning with Phase Four, television series were included as part of the Phases alongside their feature films. Each series is released on Disney+. Phase Four includes the series WandaVision (2021), The Falcon and the Winter Soldier (2021), the first season of Loki (2021), the first season of the animated series What If...? (2021), Hawkeye (2021), Moon Knight (2022), Ms. Marvel (2022), and She-Hulk: Attorney at Law (2022). Phase Five includes Secret Invasion (2023), the second season of Loki (2023), the second and third seasons of What If...? (2023–24), Echo (2024), Agatha All Along (2024), the first season of the animated series Your Friendly Neighborhood Spider-Man (2025), the first season of Daredevil: Born Again (2025), and Ironheart (2025). Phase Six includes the animated miniseries Eyes of Wakanda (2025), the first season of the animated series Marvel Zombies (2025) and its continuation special Marvel Zombies: The Winter Soldier (2027), Wonder Man (2026), the second and third seasons of Daredevil: Born Again (2026–27), VisionQuest (2026), and the second season of Your Friendly Neighborhood Spider-Man (2027). Phase Seven is expected to include the animated specials Marvel Zombies: The Fist of Khonshu and Marvel Zombies: The Last Guardian (2028–29), and Zodiac (2028).

== Other media ==
=== Short films ===
The Marvel One-Shots are a series of direct-to-video short films included as special features on the MCU films' Blu-ray and digital distribution releases. The films included The Consultant (2011), A Funny Thing Happened on the Way to Thor's Hammer (2011), Item 47 (2012), Agent Carter (2013), and All Hail the King (2014). Following the One-Shots becoming available on Disney+ in January 2022, Marvel classified the Team Thor mockumentary shorts as One-Shots. Team Thor is a series of direct-to-video mockumentary short films that were released from 2016 to 2018, consisting of Team Thor, Team Thor: Part 2, and Team Darryl, all written and directed by Taika Waititi.

I Am Groot is a series of photorealistic animated short films for Disney+ featuring Baby Groot on adventures with new and unusual characters. Vin Diesel reprises his role, with five shorts released on August 10, 2022. A second season with five additional shorts was released on September 6, 2023.

=== Television specials ===
Television specials from part of the MCU are known as Special Presentations. The Marvel Studios Special Presentations Werewolf by Night and The Guardians of the Galaxy Holiday Special, both released in 2022, are part of Phase Four, and were followed by the Marvel Television Special Presentation The Punisher: One Last Kill (2026), which is part of Phase Six.

=== Digital series ===
WHIH Newsfront (2015–16) is an in-universe current affairs show that serves as a viral marketing campaign for some of the MCU films, created in partnership with Google for YouTube. The campaign is an extension of the fictional news network WHIH World News, which is seen reporting on major events in many MCU films and television series. Leslie Bibb reprises her role as Christine Everhart from the Iron Man films.

Agents of S.H.I.E.L.D.: Slingshot (2016) is one of several Agents of S.H.I.E.L.D. web series created for ABC.com and produced by Marvel Television that are a supplement to Agents of S.H.I.E.L.D., with the main cast reprising their roles.

The first two seasons of The Daily Bugle (2019–2022) are an in-universe current affairs show serving as a viral marketing campaign for the films Spider-Man: Far From Home and Spider-Man: No Way Home, with the videos released on YouTube and TikTok. It is based on the fictional sensationalist news outlet TheDailyBugle.net that appears in the MCU—itself based on the fictional newspaper agency the Daily Bugle that appears in several Marvel Comics publications. J. K. Simmons and Angourie Rice reprise their roles as J. Jonah Jameson and Betty Brant from the Spider-Man films.

=== Comic books ===
Marvel Comics has published multiple limited series or one-shot comic books that tie into the MCU films and television series. They tell additional stories about existing characters or establish connections between MCU projects, without necessarily expanding the universe or introducing new concepts or characters.

=== Books ===
The Wakanda Files: A Technological Exploration of the Avengers and Beyond is "a collection of papers, articles, blueprints, and notes amassed throughout history by Wakanda's War Dogs" at the request of Shuri. The in-universe book covers technological advancements throughout the MCU, organized by areas of study. Troy Benjamin wrote the book that Epic Ink and the Quarto Publishing Group published. The Wakanda Files has content printed with UV ink that can be viewed with Kimoyo bead–shaped UV lights included with the book. It was released on October 20, 2020.

Look Out for the Little Guy, the fictional memoir written by Scott Lang as seen in Ant-Man and the Wasp: Quantumania, was released by Hyperion Avenue on September 5, 2023. It was created alongside Marvel Studios and the Quantumania filmmakers, and was written by Rob Kutner, featuring "over 20 short pieces exploring different aspects of Scott's experiences" as a father and Avenger. Quantumania writer Jeff Loveness wrote the material from the memoir that was featured in the film.

=== Music ===
Various composers have created the film and television scores of the MCU films, television series, One-Shots, Special Presentations, and other related projects of the MCU, primarily released by Marvel Studios's record label Marvel Music. Original songs have also been created specifically for use in the franchise, while Brian Tyler and Michael Giacchino have both scored fanfares for the Marvel Studios production logo.

== Fictional universe ==
=== Timeline ===
The fictional timeline of the MCU includes the feature films, television series, television specials, short films, and the I Am Groot shorts from Marvel Studios and Marvel Television's Netflix series. While the early films of Phase One and Phase Two of the franchise followed each other in the timeline similar to their release order, Phase Three saw many of the films' events overlap but also introduced the first prequel property to established MCU events: Captain Marvel. The Phase Three film Avengers: Endgame featured characters traveling into the past and introduced a five-year time jump, with many subsequent releases in Phase Four, Phase Five and Phase Six set after Endgame's events in the timeline. The television series Loki and What If...? were the first properties to occur outside of the main timeline and explore alternative timelines and universes.

There have been numerous attempts by Marvel Studios and others to codify the events of the MCU, which have been subject to perceived continuity errors, resulting in Marvel Studios releasing an official timeline book in 2023 for their first four phases that were designated as part of their "Sacred Timeline". This book did not feature projects produced by other companies, such as the Marvel Television series, which were all loosely connected to the films; however, it was noted that all of these outside projects were part of the larger Marvel canon. In early 2024, Marvel Studios formally integrated Marvel Television's group of Netflix series into its Disney+ timeline.

As of the Phase Six film Spider-Man: Brand New Day (2026), the MCU's "present day" is 2028. The following covers and discusses MCU media released by Marvel Studios and the Netflix series by Marvel Television. Loki and What If...? are excluded from the diagram because they occur outside of the main timeline. Werewolf by Night is also excluded because it explicitly does not indicate where it takes place in the MCU. Disney+'s timeline order places the first seasons of Loki and What If...? between Avengers: Endgame and WandaVision, their second seasons after The Marvels, and Werewolf by Night after Thor: Love and Thunder; Werewolf by Night is also placed here in The Marvel Cinematic Universe: An Official Timeline.

Key:
- Occurs on the MCU's Sacred Timeline
- Occurs outside the MCU's Sacred Timeline at a set timeframe

Marvel Cinematic Universe timeline (as of VisionQuest)
1260 BC	Eyes of Wakanda ep. 1
1259 BC–1201 BC	
1200 BC	Eyes of Wakanda ep. 2
1199 BC–1399	
1400	Eyes of Wakanda ep. 3
1401–1895	
1896	Eyes of Wakanda ep. 4
1897–1942	
1943–1945	The First Avenger
1946	Agent Carter
1947–1963	
1964	The Fantastic Four: First Steps (Note: The Fantastic Four: First Steps takes place on Earth-828 in 1964.)
1965–1994	
1995	Captain Marvel
1996–2009	
2010	Iron Man
2011	Iron Man 2
2011	The Incredible Hulk
2011	A Funny Thing...
2011	Thor
2011	The Consultant
2012	The Avengers
2012	Item 47
2013	The Dark World
2013	Iron Man 3
2014	All Hail the King
2014	The Winter Soldier
2014	Guardians of the Galaxy
2014	I Am Groot ep. 1
2014	Guardians of the Galaxy Vol. 2
2014	I Am Groot eps. 2–10
2015	Daredevil season 1
2015	Jessica Jones season 1
2015	Age of Ultron
2015	Ant-Man
2015	Daredevil season 2
2015	Luke Cage season 1
2016	Iron Fist season 1
2016	The Defenders
2016	Civil War
2016	Your Friendly Neighborhood; Spider-Man season 1 (Note: Your Friendly Neighborhood Spider-Man season 1 takes place on Earth-86445 around the events of Civil War.)
2016	Black Widow
2016	Black Panther
2016	Homecoming
2016	The Punisher season 1
2016–2017	Doctor Strange
2017	Jessica Jones season 2
2017	Luke Cage season 2
2017	Iron Fist season 2
2017	Daredevil season 3
2017	Ragnarok
2018	The Punisher season 2
2018	Jessica Jones season 3
2018	Ant-Man and the Wasp
2018	Infinity War
2019–2022	
2023	Endgame
2023	Marvel Zombies season 1 (Note: Marvel Zombies takes place on the alternate reality from the What If...? episode "What If... Zombies?!" (2021).)
2023	WandaVision
2024	Deadpool & Wolverine (Note: Deadpool & Wolverine takes place on Earth-10005 and in the Void; it occurs after the events of Loki season 2.)
2024	Shang-Chi
2024	The Falcon and the Winter Soldier
2024	Far From Home
2024	Eternals
2024	No Way Home
2024	Multiverse of Madness
2024	Hawkeye
2025	Moon Knight
2025	Wakanda Forever
2025	Echo
2025	She-Hulk
2025	Ms. Marvel
2025	Love and Thunder
2025	Ironheart
2025	The Guardians of the Galaxy; Holiday Special
2025–2027	Wonder Man
2026	Quantumania
2026	Guardians of the Galaxy Vol. 3
2026	Secret Invasion
2026	The Marvels
2026	Agatha All Along
2026	Born Again season 1 ep. 1
2027	Born Again season 1 eps. 2–9
2027	Brave New World
2027	Thunderbolts*
2027	Born Again season 2
2027	The Punisher: One Last Kill
2028	Brand New Day
2028	VisionQuest

=== Multiverse ===
The Official Handbook of the Marvel Universe A to Z, Vol. 5, published in 2008, originally designated the Marvel Cinematic Universe as Earth-199999 within the continuity of Marvel's comic multiverse, a collection of fictional alternate universes, although this designation was rarely used officially outside of the source material. The television series Loki and What If...? were the first to explore the concept of the multiverse within the MCU, as well as the film Spider-Man: No Way Home, which connected the MCU to other Spider-Man film franchises by featuring characters from Sam Raimi's Spider-Man trilogy (2002–2007), Marc Webb's The Amazing Spider-Man films (2012–14), and Sony's Spider-Man Universe (SSU). The SSU film Venom: Let There Be Carnage (2021) briefly featured the main universe of the MCU as well. In Doctor Strange in the Multiverse of Madness, the main universe of MCU events was designated as Earth-616 (a designation first referenced in Spider-Man: Far From Home), sharing the name of the main Marvel Comics universe, while another universe was designated as Earth-838. Sony's animated film Spider-Man: Across the Spider-Verse (2023) references the events of No Way Home, citing the MCU's primary reality as Earth-199999. 20th Century Fox's X-Men film series (2000–2020) is designated as Earth-10005 in Deadpool & Wolverine. That film features several actors reprising their roles from the X-Men film series along with characters from Fox's films Daredevil (2003) and its spin-off Elektra (2005), Fantastic Four (2005) and its sequel Fantastic Four: Rise of the Silver Surfer (2007), and New Line Cinema's Blade film trilogy (1994–2004). Phases Four, Five, and Six comprise "The Multiverse Saga".

With the release of The Marvel Cinematic Universe: An Official Timeline in October 2023, Feige wrote in its foreword that Marvel Studios only considered, at that time, projects developed by them in their first four phases as part of their "Sacred Timeline", but acknowledged the history of other Marvel films and television series that would exist in the larger multiverse and said they were "canonical to Marvel". In January 2024, Winderbaum acknowledged that Marvel Studios had previously been "a little bit cagey" about what was part of their Sacred Timeline, noting how there had been the corporate divide between what Marvel Studios created and what Marvel Television created. He continued that as time had passed, Marvel Studios began to see "how well integrated the [Marvel Television] stories are" and personally felt confident in saying Marvel Television's Daredevil was part of the Sacred Timeline.

== Recurring cast and characters ==
List indicators

This section includes characters who will appear or have appeared in at least three MCU films or television series and received main billing credit in at least two film franchises or series.

- A dark grey cell indicates the character was not in the media, or that the character's presence has not yet been confirmed.
- A ^{P} indicates an appearance in onscreen photographs.
- A ^{V} indicates a voice-only role.

Recurring cast members and characters in the Marvel Cinematic Universe
Character	Feature films	Television series and specials	Short films	Digital series	Animation
Ayo	Florence Kasumba	Florence Kasumba			
Bruce Banner Hulk	Edward Norton; Lou Ferrigno^{V} Mark Ruffalo	Mark Ruffalo	Mark Ruffalo		Mark Ruffalo
Bucky Barnes Winter Soldier / White Wolf	Sebastian Stan	Sebastian Stan			Sebastian Stan
Clint Barton Hawkeye / Ronin	Jeremy Renner	Jeremy Renner			Jeremy Renner
Laura Barton	Linda Cardellini	Linda Cardellini			
Yelena Belova	Florence Pugh	Florence Pugh			Florence Pugh
Kate Bishop	Hailee Steinfeld	Hailee Steinfeld			Hailee Steinfeld
Emil Blonsky Abomination	Tim Roth	Tim Roth			
Luke Cage		Mike Colter			
Peggy Carter	Hayley Atwell	Hayley Atwell	Hayley Atwell		Hayley Atwell
Sharon Carter Agent 13 / Power Broker	Emily VanCamp	Emily VanCamp			Emily VanCamp
Frank Castle Punisher	Jon Bernthal	Jon Bernthal			
P. Cleary	Arian Moayed	Arian Moayed			
Phil Coulson	Clark Gregg	Clark Gregg	Clark Gregg	Clark Gregg	Clark Gregg
Carol Danvers Captain Marvel	Brie Larson	Brie Larson			Alexandra Daniels
Drax the Destroyer	Dave Bautista	Dave Bautista			Fred Tatasciore
Hope van Dyne Wasp	Evangeline Lilly				Evangeline Lilly
Wilson Fisk Kingpin		Vincent D'Onofrio			
Valentina Allegra de Fontaine	Julia Louis-Dreyfus	Julia Louis-Dreyfus			
F.R.I.D.A.Y.	Kerry Condon^{V}	Orla Brady			Kerry Condon
Nick Fury	Samuel L. Jackson	Samuel L. Jackson			Samuel L. Jackson
Gamora	Zoë Saldaña				Cynthia McWilliams
Ben Grimm The Thing	Ebon Moss-Bachrach				
Groot	Vin Diesel^{V}	Vin Diesel^{V}	Vin Diesel^{V}		Fred Tatasciore
Justin Hammer	Sam Rockwell		Sam Rockwell		Sam Rockwell
Agatha Harkness		Kathryn Hahn			Kathryn Hahn
Heimdall	Idris Elba				Idris Elba
Maria Hill	Cobie Smulders	Cobie Smulders			Cobie Smulders
Happy Hogan	Jon Favreau				Jon Favreau
J.A.R.V.I.S. Edwin Jarvis	Paul Bettany; James D'Arcy	James D'Arcy			James D'Arcy
Jessica Jones		Krysten Ritter			
Kamala Khan Ms. Marvel	Iman Vellani	Iman Vellani			Iman Vellani
Muneeba Khan	Zenobia Shroff	Zenobia Shroff			Zenobia Shroff
Yusuf Khan	Mohan Kapur	Mohan Kapur			
Misty Knight		Simone Missick			
Korath	Djimon Hounsou				Djimon Hounsou
Scott Lang Ant-Man	Paul Rudd			Paul Rudd	Paul Rudd
Darcy Lewis	Kat Dennings	Kat Dennings			Kat Dennings
Loki	Tom Hiddleston	Tom Hiddleston			Tom Hiddleston
Mantis	Pom Klementieff	Pom Klementieff			
Billy Maximoff / William Kaplan Wiccan	Julian Hilliard	Julian Hilliard Joe Locke			
Wanda Maximoff Scarlet Witch	Elizabeth Olsen	Elizabeth Olsen			Elizabeth Olsen
M'Baku	Winston Duke				
Matt Murdock Daredevil	Charlie Cox	Charlie Cox			Charlie Cox
Elektra Natchios		Élodie Yung			
Nebula	Karen Gillan	Karen Gillan			Karen Gillan
Foggy Nelson		Elden Henson			
Okoye	Danai Gurira				Danai Gurira Kenna Ramsey
Karen Page		Deborah Ann Woll			
May Parker	Marisa Tomei				Kari Wahlgren
Peter Parker Spider-Man	Tom Holland			Tom Holland	Hudson Thames
Pepper Potts	Gwyneth Paltrow				Beth Hoyt
Hank Pym	Michael Douglas				Michael Douglas
Peter Quill Star-Lord	Chris Pratt	Chris Pratt			Brian T. Delaney
Monica Rambeau	Akira Akbar Teyonah Parris	Teyonah Parris			Teyonah Parris
Ramonda	Angela Bassett				Angela Bassett
Danny Rand Iron Fist		Finn Jones			
James Rhodes War Machine / Iron Patriot	Terrence Howard Don Cheadle	Don Cheadle			Don Cheadle
Reed Richards Mister Fantastic	Pedro Pascal				
Rocket	Bradley Cooper^{V}	Bradley Cooper^{V}	Bradley Cooper^{V}		
Steve Rogers Captain America	Chris Evans				Josh Keaton
Natasha Romanoff Black Widow	Scarlett Johansson				Lake Bell
Everett K. Ross	Martin Freeman	Martin Freeman			
Thaddeus Ross Red Hulk	William Hurt Harrison Ford				Mike McGill Travis Willingham
Erik Selvig	Stellan Skarsgård				
Alexei Shostakov Red Guardian	David Harbour				David Harbour
Shuri Black Panther	Letitia Wright				Ozioma Akagha
Trevor Slattery	Ben Kingsley	Ben Kingsley	Ben Kingsley		
Howard Stark	Gerard Sanders^{P} John Slattery Dominic Cooper	Dominic Cooper	Dominic Cooper		Dominic Cooper John Slattery
Tony Stark Iron Man	Robert Downey Jr.				Mick Wingert
Ava Starr Ghost	Hannah John-Kamen				
Johnny Storm Human Torch	Joseph Quinn				
Susan Storm Invisible Woman	Vanessa Kirby				
Dr. Stephen Strange	Benedict Cumberbatch				Benedict Cumberbatch Robin Atkin Downes
Talos	Ben Mendelsohn	Ben Mendelsohn			
T'Challa Black Panther	Chadwick Boseman				Chadwick Boseman
Claire Temple	Rosario Dawson	Rosario Dawson			
Thor	Chris Hemsworth		Chris Hemsworth		Chris Hemsworth Greg Furman
Joaquin Torres Falcon	Danny Ramirez	Danny Ramirez			
Ultron	James Spader Ross Marquand^{V}	James Spader			Ross Marquand
Valkyrie	Tessa Thompson				Tessa Thompson
Vision	Paul Bettany	Paul Bettany			Paul Bettany
John Walker Captain America / U.S. Agent	Wyatt Russell	Wyatt Russell			Wyatt Russell
Riri Williams Ironheart	Dominique Thorne	Dominique Thorne			Dominique Thorne
Sam Wilson Falcon / Captain America	Anthony Mackie	Anthony Mackie			Anthony Mackie
Colleen Wing		Jessica Henwick			
Wong	Benedict Wong	Benedict Wong			Benedict Wong David Chen
Jimmy Woo	Randall Park	Randall Park			Randall Park
Xu Shang-Chi	Simu Liu				Simu Liu
Helmut Zemo	Daniel Brühl	Daniel Brühl			Rama Vallury

Additionally, Paul Bettany was the first actor to portray two main characters within the universe, voicing Tony Stark's artificial intelligence (AI) J.A.R.V.I.S. and portraying the synthezoid Vision in multiple projects each. He went on to portray two more related characters in the Disney+ series VisionQuest (2026): J.I.M. / Synthetic Man, the world's first synthezoid; and J.I.M.'s creator Phineas Horton. James D'Arcy was the first actor to reprise their role from an MCU television series in an MCU film when he appeared as his character Edwin Jarvis—the human inspiration for J.A.R.V.I.S.—from the series Agent Carter (2015–16) in Endgame. D'Arcy later portrayed a human avatar of J.A.R.V.I.S. in VisionQuest. J. K. Simmons became the first actor to reprise a non-MCU role in the MCU when he appeared as J. Jonah Jameson, a role he played in director Sam Raimi's Spider-Man trilogy from 2002 to 2007, in Spider-Man: Far From Home.

Before he died in 2018, Stan Lee, the creator or co-creator of many of the characters adapted in the MCU, made many cameo appearances in all of the feature films and television series except Inhumans. In Iron Fist, his on-set photograph cameo in the Marvel Netflix series is revealed as NYPD Captain Irving Forbush. His cameo in Guardians of the Galaxy Vol. 2 sees Lee appearing as an informant to the Watchers, discussing previous adventures that include Lee's cameos in other MCU films; he specifically mentions his time as a FedEx delivery driver, referring to Lee's cameo in Captain America: Civil War. This acknowledged the fan theory that Lee may be portraying the same character in all his cameos, with writer and director James Gunn noting that commentators believed Lee was portraying the character Uatu the Watcher and "that all of these cameos are part of him being a Watcher. So, Stan Lee as a guy who is working for the Watchers was something that I thought was fun for the MCU." Feige added that Lee "clearly exists, you know, above and apart from the reality of all the films. So the notion that he could be sitting there on a cosmic pit stop during the jump gate sequence in Guardians...really says, so wait a minute, he's this same character who's popped up in all these films?" Following Lee's death, Marvel Studios chose not to create any new Lee cameos in future projects. NY1 news anchor Pat Kiernan has also appeared in multiple MCU films and television series as himself.

== Reception ==
Early on, the shared universe element of the MCU was criticized by some journalists. Around the release of The Avengers in 2012, Jim Vorel of Herald & Review called the MCU "complicated" and "impressive", but said, "As more and more heroes get their own film adaptations, the overall universe becomes increasingly confusing." Kofi Outlaw of Screen Rant stated that while The Avengers was a success, "Marvel Studios still has room to improve their approach to building a shared movie universe". Some reviewers criticized the fact that the desire to create a shared universe led to films that did not hold as well on their own. In his review of Thor: The Dark World, Forbes critic Scott Mendelson likened the MCU to "a glorified television series", with The Dark World being a "'stand-alone' episode that contains little long-range mythology". Collider's Matt Goldberg considered that while Iron Man 2, Thor and Captain America: The First Avenger were quality productions, "they have never really been their own movies", feeling that the plot detours to S.H.I.E.L.D. or lead-ups to The Avengers dragged down the films' narratives.

The metaphor of the MCU as "the world's biggest TV show" was discussed again, after the release of Captain America: Civil War, by Emily St. James of Vox, who felt that film in particular highlighted Marvel's success with the model, saying, "Viewed in complete isolation, the plot of Captain America: Civil War makes little to no sense ... [but] when you think about where [Captain America] has been in earlier Marvel films ... his leeriness about being subject to oversight makes a lot more sense." St. James continued that when thinking about the MCU as a television series, many "common criticisms people tend to level at it take on a new context" such as complaints that the films are formulaic, lack "visual spark", or "shoehorn in story elements" that "are necessary to set up future films", all characteristics that "are fairly typical on television, where a director's influence is much lower than that of the showrunner", in this case, Feige. Comparing the films to the series Game of Thrones specifically, St. James noted that each solo film checks "in on various characters and their individual side stories, before bringing everyone together in the finale (or, rather, an Avengers film)", with Guardians of the Galaxy being equivalent to the character Daenerys Targaryen—"both separated by long distances from everybody else". She noted that this format was an extension of early "TV-like" film franchises such as Star Wars, as well as the format of the comics upon which the films are based. "I say all of this not to suggest that film franchises resembling TV series is necessarily a good trend", St. James concluded, "For as much as I generally enjoy the Marvel movies, I'm disheartened by the possibility that their particular form might take over the film industry ... But I also don't think it's the end of the world if Marvel continues on ... there's a reason TV has stolen so much of the cultural conversation over the past few decades. There's something legitimately exciting about the way the medium tells stories when it's good, and if nothing else, Marvel's success shows the film world could learn from that."

Following the conclusion of the first season of Agents of S.H.I.E.L.D., Mary McNamara at the Los Angeles Times praised the connections between that series and the films, stating that "never before has television been literally married to film, charged with filling in the back story and creating the connective tissue of an ongoing film franchise ... [Agents of S.H.I.E.L.D.] is now not only a very good show in its own right, it's part of Marvel's multiplatform city-state. It faces a future of perpetual re-invention, and that puts it in the exhilarating first car of television's roller-coaster ride toward possible world domination." Terri Schwartz of Zap2it agreed with this sentiment, stating that "the fact that [Captain America: The Winter Soldier] so influenced the show is game-changing in terms of how the mediums of film and television can be interwoven", though "the fault there seems to be that Agents of S.H.I.E.L.D. had to bide time until The Winter Soldier's release", which led to much criticism.

In January 2015, Michael Doran of Newsarama and Graeme McMillan of The Hollywood Reporter had a "point-counterpoint" debate in response to the first Ant-Man trailer. Doran stated, "Marvel has raised the bar sooo high that as opposed to just allowing another film to finish under the [MCU] bar, we're all overly and perhaps even eager to overreact to the first thing that doesn't clear it". McMillan responded, "at this point, Marvel's brand is such that I'm not sure it can offer up something like [the trailer] without it seeming like a crushing disappointment ... part of Marvel's brand is that it doesn't offer the kind of run-of-the-mill superhero movie that you're talking about, that it's ... at least different enough to tweak and play with the genre somehow ... The fact that there's such upset about this trailer being ... well, okay ... suggests to me that the audience is expecting something to knock their socks off." Doran concluded, "That does seem to be the point here—the expectations fans now have for everything Marvel Studios ... [and] Marvel is going to eventually falter."

After seeing the portrayal of Yellowjacket in Ant-Man, the antagonist of the film, McMillan noted,

It's hardly a secret that Marvel Studios has a bit of a problem when it comes to offering up exciting characters for their heroes to fight against ... [their] villains generally fall into one of two camps. There's the Unstoppable Monster ... or there's the Professional White Guy in a Suit with an Ego ... No matter which of the groups the above villains fall into, they share one common purpose: evil. The motivations for evil likely differ—although, invariably, they fall under the umbrella of 'misguided belief in a greater good that doesn't exist'—but that really doesn't matter, because without fail, there will be so little time in the movie to actually properly explore those motivations, meaning that to all intents and purposes, the villain is being evil for reasons of plot necessity and little else ... The strange thing about this is that Marvel's comic books offer a number of wonderful, colorful bad guys who could step outside the above parameters and offer an alternative to the formulaic villains audiences have gotten used to (and arguably bored with) ... In future movies, we can only hope [they are] treated in such a way that their freak flags are allowed to fly free.

Following the release of Jessica Jones, David Priest at CNET wrote about how the series rescues "Marvel from itself ... Jessica Jones takes big steps forward in terms of theme, craft and diversity. It's a good story first, and a superhero show second. And for the first time, the MCU seems like it matters. Our culture needs stories like this. Here's hoping Marvel keeps them coming." For Paul Tassi and Erik Kain of Forbes, watching the series made them question the MCU, with Kain feeling that the "morally complex, violent, dark world of Jessica Jones has no place in the MCU ... right now, the MCU is holding back shows like Jessica Jones and Daredevil, while those shows are contributing absolutely nothing to the MCU." Tassi went so far as to wonder what "the point of the Marvel Cinematic Universe" is, lamenting the lack of major crossovers in the franchise since the Winter Soldier reveal on Agents of S.H.I.E.L.D., and saying that Jessica Jones is "so far removed from the world of The Avengers, it might as well not be in the same universe at all ... [I] really don't understand the point of [the MCU] if they're going to keep everything within it separated off in these little boxes". Conversely, Eric Francisco of Inverse called Jessica Jones's lack of overt connections to the MCU "the show's chief advantage. Besides demonstrating how physically wide open the MCU's scope really is, Jessica Jones also proves the MCU's thematic durability."

In April 2016, Marvel Studios revealed that Alfre Woodard would appear in Captain America: Civil War, having already been cast as Mariah Dillard in Luke Cage the previous year. This "raised hopes that Marvel could be uniting its film and Netflix universes", with "one of the first and strongest connections" between the two. Civil War writers Christopher Markus and Stephen McFeely revealed that Woodard would instead be portraying Miriam Sharpe in the film, explaining that she had been cast on the suggestion of Robert Downey Jr., and they had not learned of her casting in Luke Cage until afterwards. This was not the first instance of actors being cast in multiple roles in the MCU, but this casting was called more "significant", and seen by many as a "disappointing" indication of "the growing divide" and "lack of more satisfying cooperation" between Marvel Studios and Marvel Television following the September 2015 corporate reshuffling of Marvel Entertainment.

Speaking to the 1990s setting of Captain Marvel, "the MCU's first full period piece since Phase One's Captain America: The First Avenger in 2011", Richard Newby of The Hollywood Reporter felt the return of younger versions of some characters introduced and killed in earlier films "open[ed] up the MCU in a whole new way and broaden[ed] the franchise's mantra of 'it's all connected'". Speaking specifically to Clark Gregg's appearance as Agent Phil Coulson in the film, Newby noted the appearance "doesn't exactly mend fences between Marvel's film and TV divisions, [but] it does strengthen the connective tissue and the sense that these characters still matter in the grand scheme of Marvel's film plans". He also hoped that continuity from Agents of S.H.I.E.L.D. would be maintained in Captain Marvel, especially since Coulson has dealt with the Kree in the series. Newby also added that shifting to different time periods would help Marvel Studios "sustain this cinematic universe for the next 10 years" by allowing them to repeat some of the genres previously used, as they could then feel "fresh" and have "different rules and different restraints", as well as allow them to build upon material established in the television series such as Agent Carter. He concluded,

Marvel Studios has an entire sandbox to play in, but, for necessary reasons, has largely chosen to remain in a small corner in order to ground audiences in these concepts. Now that the basis has been laid, the opportunity for exploration in both film and television lies ahead, with Captain Marvel leading the way. Wherever Marvel Studios plans to take the MCU in the future, it's refreshing to know that its past is expansive and filled with infinite possibilities.

Likewise, in his review of Avengers: Endgame, Joe Morgenstern of The Wall Street Journal acknowledged the unique achievement that the Marvel Cinematic Universe had accomplished:

These are difficult times for big-screen entertainment. As the medium declines and TV grows ascendant, authentic spectacles—as opposed to lavish embellishments of smallish ideas—threaten to become a thing of the fabled past. All the more reason, then, to cherish what Marvel has achieved, even though befuddling stumbles have occurred along the way. The studio has kept the faith by smartening up most of its films, not dumbing them down, by banking on, and raking in profits from, the audience's appetite for surprise, its capacity for complexity. When the final battle comes at the end of Avengers: Endgame, it's inevitably unwieldy—every Marvel character you can think of from the past decade shows up for one more assault on cosmic evil—but thrilling all the same, and followed by a delicate coda. So many stories. So many adventures. So much to sort out before the next cycle starts.

Many famous filmmakers have expressed different views on both the success and quality of the MCU. In October 2019, filmmaker Martin Scorsese openly criticized Marvel films in an interview and during a David Lean lecture in London, later expanded in an op-ed in The New York Times, asserting that these films are not cinema, but are instead the equivalent of theme park rides that lack "mystery, revelation or genuine emotional danger". He also stated that such films are corporation products that have been "market-researched, audience-tested, vetted, modified, revetted and remodified until they're ready for consumption", and that the invasion of such "theme park" films in theaters crowded out films by other directors. Scorsese's remarks were dismissed by directors of MCU films such as Joss Whedon and James Gunn, while they were defended by Francis Ford Coppola, who described the potential effect of Marvel films in the film industry as "despicable". In September 2021, director Denis Villeneuve noted that Marvel films "are nothing more than a 'cut and paste' of others" that have "turned us into zombies a bit". In February 2022, director Roland Emmerich felt large blockbuster films such as the MCU and Star Wars films were "ruining our industry a little", since "nobody does anything original anymore". Conversely, George Miller stated, "To me, it's all cinema. I don't think you can ghettoize it and say, oh this is cinema or that is cinema. It applies to all the arts, to literature, the performing arts, painting and music, in all its form. It's such a broad spectrum, a wide range and to say that anyone is more significant or more important than the other, is missing the point. It's one big mosaic and each bit of work fits into it."

Marvel's American audience was studied by Morning Consult in 2021, which found that 9% of Marvel's fan base is Generation Z, 64% of fans are White adults, and 42% of fans live in suburban areas. In 2023, critics began describing the volume of interconnected storylines as a "homework assignment".

== Cultural impact ==
=== Other studios ===
After the release of The Avengers in May 2012, Tom Russo of Boston.com noted that aside from the occasional "novelty" such as Alien vs. Predator (2004), the idea of a shared universe was virtually unheard of in Hollywood. Since that time, the shared universe model created by Marvel Studios has begun to be replicated by other film studios that held rights to other comic book characters. In April 2014, Tuna Amobi, a media analyst for Standard & Poor's Equity Research Services, stated that over the previous three to five years, Hollywood studios had begun planning "megafranchises" for years to come, rather than working on one blockbuster at a time. Amobi added, "A lot of these superhero characters were just being left there to gather dust. Disney has proved that this [approach and genre] can be a gold mine." With more studios now "playing the megafranchise game", Doug Creutz, media analyst for Cowen and Company, feels the allure will eventually die for audiences: "If Marvel's going to make two or three films a year, and Warner Brothers is going to do at least a film every year, and Sony's going to do a film every year, and Fox [is] going to do a film every year, can everyone do well in that scenario? I'm not sure they can."

In March 2018, Patrick Shanley of The Hollywood Reporter opined that "the key differences between a regular franchise, such as The Fast and the Furious or Pitch Perfect films, and a shared universe is the amount of planning and interweaving that goes into each individual film. It's all too easy to make a film that exists solely for the purpose of setting up future installments and expanding a world, rather than a film that stands on its own merits while deftly hinting or winking at its place in the larger mythos. In that, the MCU has flourished." He felt that Iron Man "itself was aimed at being an enjoyable stand-alone experience, not as an overall advertisement for 17 subsequent movies. That mentality has persisted through most of the MCU films over the past decade, which is all the more impressive as its roster of heroes now exceeds the two-dozen mark."

==== DC Entertainment, Warner Bros. Pictures, and DC Studios ====
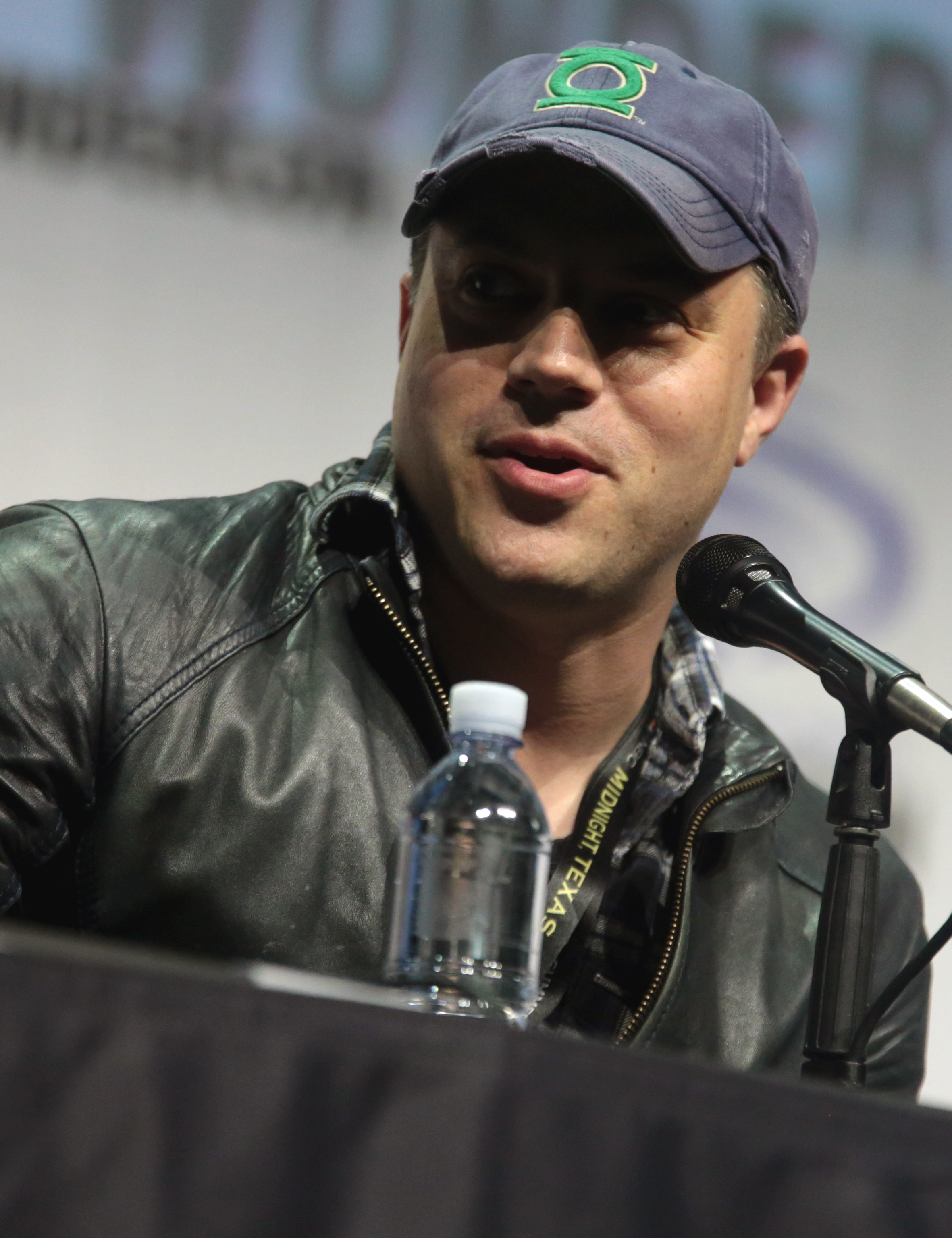
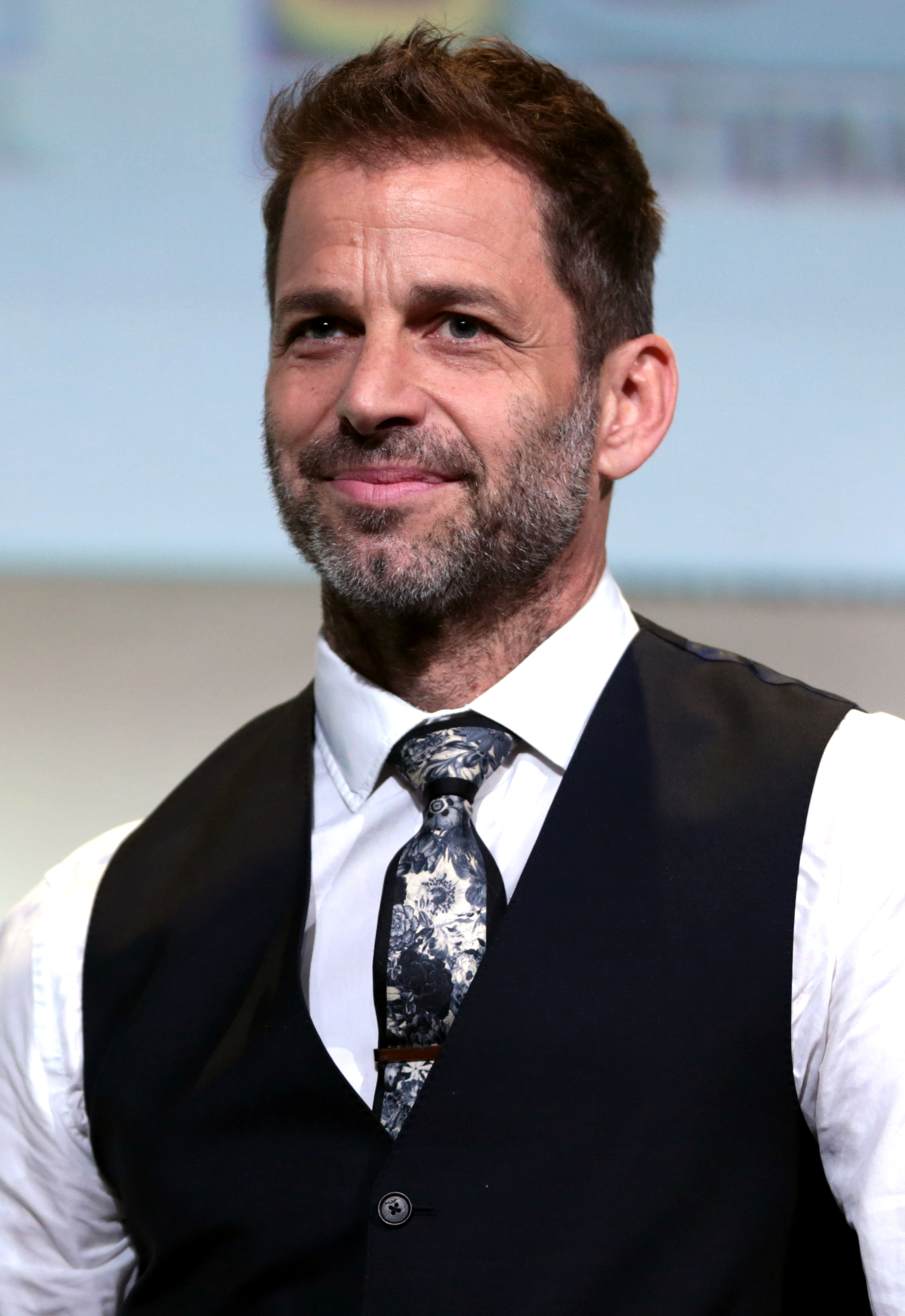
(L–R): Writer and producer Geoff Johns and filmmakers Zack Snyder and James Gunn have each supervised work on shared universes for DC Comics in response to the success of the MCU

In October 2012, following its legal victory over Joe Shuster's estate for the rights to Superman, Warner Bros. Pictures announced that it planned to move ahead with its long-awaited Justice League film, uniting such DC Comics superheroes as Batman, Superman, and Wonder Woman. The company was expected to take the opposite approach to Marvel, releasing individual films for the characters after they have appeared in a team-up film. The release of Man of Steel in 2013 was intended to be the start of a new shared universe for DC, "laying the groundwork for the future slate of films based on DC Comics". In 2014, Warner Bros. announced that slate of films, similarly to Disney and Marvel claiming dates for films years in advance. That year, DC chief creative officer Geoff Johns stated that the television series Arrow and The Flash were set in a separate universe from the new film one, later clarifying that "We look at it as the multiverse. We have our TV universe and our film universe, but they all co-exist. For us, creatively, it's about allowing everyone to make the best possible product, to tell the best story, to do the best world. Everyone has a vision and you really want to let the visions shine through ... It's just a different approach [from Marvel's]."

Discussing the apparent failure of the cinematic universe's first team-up film, Batman v Superman: Dawn of Justice (2016), to establish a successful equivalent to the MCU, Emily St. James noted that where the MCU has a television-like "showrunner" in Feige, "the visionary behind Marvel's entire slate", the DCEU has director Zack Snyder, whose DC films "seemingly start from the assumption that people have come not to see an individual story but a long series of teases for other ones. It's like he knows what he needs to do but can't focus on the task at hand. TV certainly isn't immune to that problem, but shows that get caught up in high-concept premises and big-picture thinking before doing the necessary legwork to establish characters and their relationships tend to be canceled." Subsequently, in May 2016, Warner Bros. gave oversight of the DCEU to Johns and executive Jon Berg in an attempt to "unify the disparate elements of the DC movies" and emulate Marvel's success. The two were made producers on the Justice League films, on top of Johns' involvement in several "solo" films, such as the post-production process of Suicide Squad (2016) or the writing process of a standalone Batman film. After the successful release of Wonder Woman in June 2017, DC decided to begin deemphasizing the shared nature of their films, with DC Entertainment president Diane Nelson stating, "Our intention, certainly, moving forward is using the continuity to help make sure nothing is diverging in a way that doesn't make sense, but there's no insistence upon an overall story line or interconnectivity in that universe... Moving forward, you'll see the DC movie universe being a universe, but one that comes from the heart of the filmmaker who's creating them." Additionally, DC began focusing on films "completely separate from everything else, set entirely outside" the DCEU as part of a new label, with the first film centered on the Joker. Following the commercial failure of Justice League (2017), which ended the DCEU approach spearheaded by Snyder, Warner Bros. executives reportedly reached out to Feige to have him lead the development of DC films but the talks "fizzled".

In August 2022, Warner Bros. Discovery CEO David Zaslav announced a 10-year plan for the DC Extended Universe similar to the one that Horn and Iger employed with Feige for the MCU, with James Gunn and Peter Safran appointed in October 2022 to serve as the co-chairmen and co-CEOs of the newly formed DC Studios to develop a new shared universe, the DC Universe, the first content for which was announced in January 2023. By July 2024, both Feige and Gunn had expressed interest in one day creating a crossover between the two franchises, though both noted it was not something actively being discussed or considered. Gunn revealed following the second-season finale of Peacemaker in October 2025 that he had wanted to show Wade Wilson / Deadpool behind one of the alternate universe doors in the Quantum Unfolding Chamber and had reached out to Deadpool actor Ryan Reynolds about it, who was interested in appearing. However, Gunn noted there would have been "some pretty, pretty big [legal] hoops" to go through to accomplish this, and ultimately moved on from the idea.

In November 2026, new Warner Bros. owner Skydance ousted Gunn and Safran and hired former Marvel Studios executive Jeremy Latcham to succeed them, effective December 1. At this point, Gunn and Safran had planned several films and television series featuring different DC superheroes into the 2030s, which were reported to have included planned Justice League films. The Hollywood Reporter and TheWrap attributed the firings to tensions over power between Ellison's team at Skydance and the Gunn–Safran duo, as well as the conglomerate's dissatisfaction with the box-office performances of Superman (2025) and Supergirl (2026) and Skydance CEO David Ellison's desire to appeal to a more general audience over the focus on lesser-known characters that Gunn had been prioritizing. Matthew Belloni from Puck News reported that many of Gunn and Safran's future plans beyond the Superman follow-up Man of Tomorrow (2027) would be "dismantle[d]", with the franchise going "back into reboot mode".

==== 20th Century Fox ====
In November 2012, 20th Century Fox announced plans to create its own shared universe of Marvel properties it held the rights to, including the Fantastic Four and X-Men, with the hiring of comic book writer Mark Millar as supervising producer. Millar said, "Fox are thinking, 'We're sitting on some really awesome things here. There is another side of the Marvel Universe. Let's try and get some cohesiveness going.' So they brought me in to oversee that really. To meet with the writers and directors to suggest new ways we could take this stuff and new properties that could spin out of it." X-Men: Days of Future Past, released in 2014, was Fox's first step towards expanding their stable of Marvel properties and creating this universe, ahead of the release of a Fantastic Four reboot film the next year. In May 2014, Days of Future Past and Fantastic Four screenwriter Simon Kinberg stated that the latter film would not take place in the same universe as the X-Men films, explaining that "none of the X-Men movies have acknowledged the notion of a sort of superhero team—the Fantastic Four. And the Fantastic Four acquire powers, so for them to live in a world where mutants are prevalent is kind of complicated, because you're like, 'Oh, you're just a mutant.' Like, 'What's so fantastic about you?' ... they live in discrete universes." In July 2015, X-Men director Bryan Singer said that there was still potential for a crossover between the X-Men and Fantastic Four franchises, if reactions to Fantastic Four and X-Men: Apocalypse (2016) warranted it.

Feeling that Singer's efforts in Apocalypse to establish a larger world, similar to the MCU, did not meet the standards established by Marvel, St. James noted that unlike Feige's ability to serve as "pseudo-showrunner", Singer is instead "steeped in film and the way movie stories have always been told", so "when it comes time to have Apocalypse dovetail with story threads from the earlier X-Men: First Class", which was directed by Matthew Vaughn, "both Singer's direction and Simon Kinberg's script rely on hackneyed devices and clumsy storytelling", indicating a lack of "the kind of big-picture thinking this sort of mega franchise requires". In his review of Dark Phoenix, Joe Morgenstern of The Wall Street Journal characterized the entire X-Men film series as being a "notoriously erratic franchise". In March 2019, the film rights to Deadpool, the X-Men characters, and the Fantastic Four characters were returned to Marvel Studios following the acquisition of 21st Century Fox by Disney.

==== Sony Pictures ====
In November 2013, Sony Pictures Entertainment co-chairman Amy Pascal announced that the studio intended to expand their universe created within director Marc Webb's The Amazing Spider-Man films (2012–14), with spin-off adventures for supporting characters, in an attempt to replicate Marvel and Disney's model. The next month, Sony announced Venom and Sinister Six films, both set in the Amazing Spider-Man universe. With this announcement, IGN stated that the spin-offs are "the latest example of what we can refer to as "the Avengers effect" in Hollywood, as studios work to build interlocking movie universes." Sony chose not to replicate the Marvel Studios model of introducing individual characters first before bringing them together in a team-up film, instead making the Spider-Man adversaries the stars of future films. In February 2015, Sony Pictures and Marvel Studios announced that the Spider-Man franchise would be retooled, with a new film co-produced by Feige and Pascal being released in July 2017, and the character being integrated into the MCU. Sony Pictures would continue to finance, distribute, own, and have final creative control of the Spider-Man films. With this announcement, sequels to The Amazing Spider-Man 2 (2014) were canceled, and by November 2015 the Venom and Sinister Six films, as well as spin-offs based on female characters in the Spider-Man universe, were no longer moving forward. By March 2016, the Venom film had itself been retooled, to start its own franchise unrelated to the MCU Spider-Man. A year later, Sony officially announced the Venom film to be in development, for an October 5, 2018, release, along with a film centered on the characters Silver Sable and Black Cat known as Silver & Black. Both projects were not intended to be a part of the MCU nor spin-offs to Spider-Man: Homecoming, but rather part of an intended separate shared universe known as the Sony's Spider-Man Universe (SSU). The mid-credits scene of Venom: Let There Be Carnage (2021) hinted at Eddie Brock / Venom joining the MCU, which was confirmed with the release of Spider-Man: No Way Home (2021) through an uncredited cameo appearance in its mid-credits scene. Spider-Man: No Way Home also featured the Spider-Man iterations from Sam Raimi and Webb's Spider-Man films, respectively reprised by Tobey Maguire and Andrew Garfield.

After Sony canceled its shared universe plans and began sharing the Spider-Man character with Marvel Studios, multiple critics discussed its failure to replicate the MCU. Scott Meslow of The Week noted the perceived flaws of the first Amazing Spider-Man film, outside of its lead performances, and how the sequel "doubles down on all the missteps of the original while adding a few of its own. ...We now have a textbook example of how not to reboot a superhero franchise, and if Sony and Marvel are wise, they'll take virtually all those lessons to heart as they chart Spider-Man's next course." Scott Mendelson noted that The Amazing Spider-Man 2 "was sold as less a sequel to The Amazing Spider-Man than a backdoor pilot for Spider-Man vs. the Sinister Six. ...Had Sony stuck with the original plan of a scaled-down superhero franchise, one that really was rooted in romantic drama, they would have at least stuck out in a crowded field of superhero franchises. When every superhero film is now going bigger, Amazing Spider-Man could have distinguished itself by going small and intimate." This would have saved Sony "a boatload of money", and potentially reversed the film's relative financial failure.

=== Academia ===
In September 2014, the University of Baltimore announced a course beginning in the 2015 spring semester revolving around the Marvel Cinematic Universe, to be taught by Arnold T. Blumberg. "Media Genres: Media Marvels" examines "how Marvel's series of interconnected films and television shows, plus related media and comic book sources and Joseph Campbell's monomyth of the 'hero's journey', offer important insights into modern culture" as well as Marvel's efforts "to establish a viable universe of plotlines, characters, and backstories."

== Outside media ==
=== Avengers Campus ===
After the acquisition by Disney in 2009, Marvel films began to be marketed at the Innoventions attraction in Tomorrowland at Disneyland. For Iron Man 3, the exhibit, entitled "Iron Man Tech Presented by Stark Industries", featured the same armor display that was shown at the 2012 San Diego Comic-Con, with the Marks I-VII and the new Mark XLII. In addition, there was a simulator game, titled "Become Iron Man", that used Kinect-like technology to allow the viewer to be encased in an animated Mark XLII armor and take part in a series of "tests", in which you fire repulsor rays and fly through Tony Stark's workshop. The game was guided by J.A.R.V.I.S., who is voiced again by Paul Bettany. The exhibit also had smaller displays that included helmets and chest pieces from the earlier films and the gauntlet and boot from an action sequence in Iron Man 3. The exhibit for Thor: The Dark World was called "Thor: Treasures of Asgard", and featured displays of Asgardian relics and transports guests to Odin's throne room, where Thor greets them. Captain America: The Winter Soldier's exhibit, "Captain America: The Living Legend and Symbol of Courage", featured a meet and greet experience.

From May to September 2017, Disneyland Resort featured the "Summer of Heroes", which saw members of the Guardians and Avengers appear throughout the Disneyland Resort. Also featured was the Guardians of the Galaxy: Awesome Dance Off event, which involved Peter Quill / Star-Lord blasting music from his boombox, along with the Avengers Training Initiative, a limited experience where Black Widow and Hawkeye "assemble a group of young recruits to see if they have what it takes to be an Avenger." Marvel-related food and merchandise was also available throughout Hollywood Land at Disney California Adventure during the "Summer of Heroes".

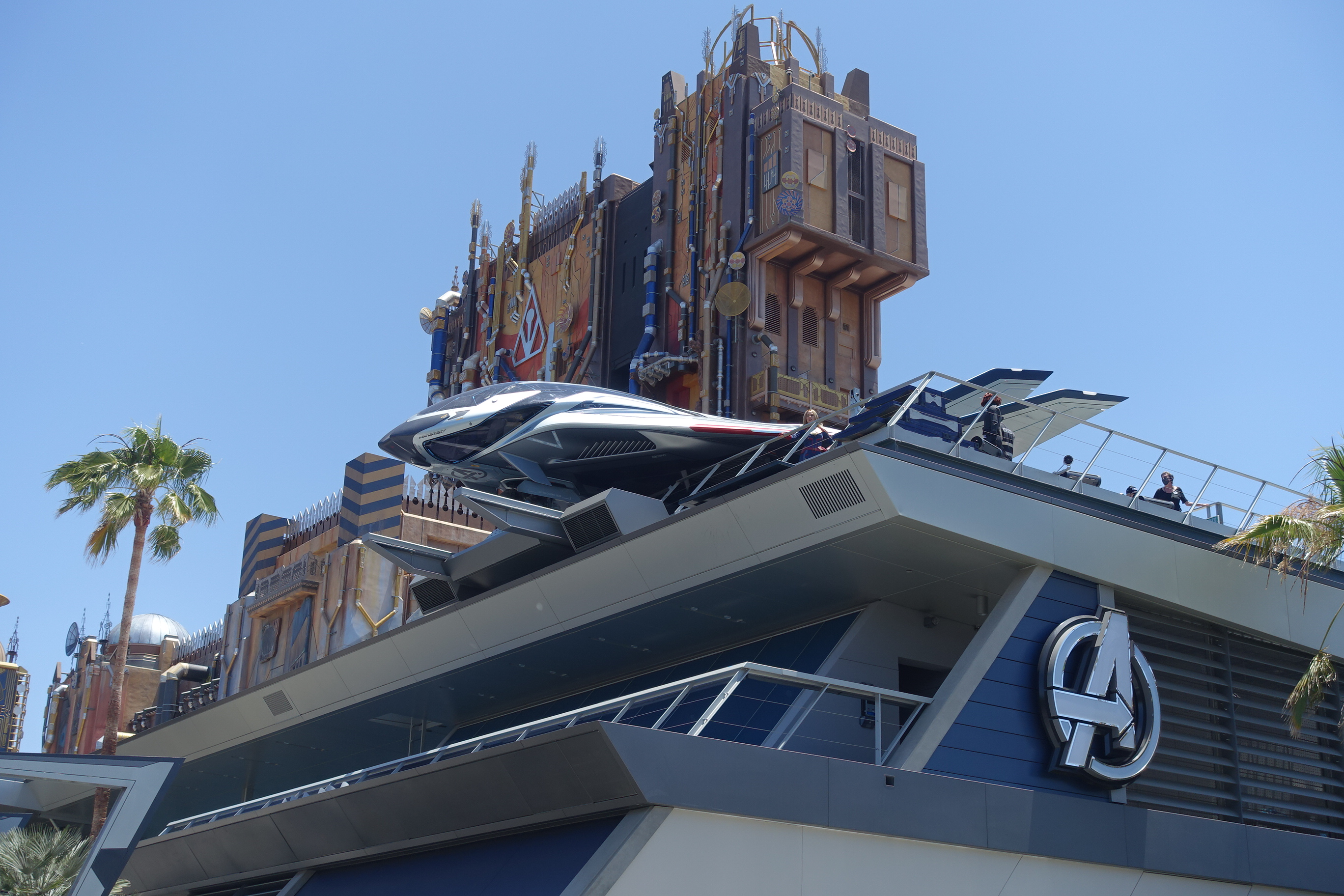
The Avengers Headquarters in Avengers Campus with Guardians of the Galaxy – Mission: Breakout! behind it, pictured in 2021

In March 2018, the Walt Disney Company announced three new Marvel-themed areas inspired by the MCU to Disney California Adventure, Walt Disney Studios Paris, and Hong Kong Disneyland. The developments were designed by Walt Disney Imagineering in collaboration with Marvel Studios and Marvel Themed Entertainment. As was established with Guardians of the Galaxy – Mission: Breakout!, Avengers Campus exists in its own theme park universe that is inspired by the MCU. Being in the MCU multiverse, Avengers Campus has a shared history with the MCU proper, with a few notable exceptions being the Blip from Avengers: Infinity War did not occur, and some characters who died, such as Tony Stark, are still alive.

==== Hong Kong Disneyland ====
In October 2013, the Iron Man Experience attraction was announced for Hong Kong Disneyland. It is set in the Tomorrowland section of the park, with the area built to look like a new Stark Expo created by Tony Stark after the 2010 one, as seen in Iron Man 2, with various exhibit halls that include the Mark III armor from the films. The area also has Iron Man and Marvel-themed merchandise items and memorabilia, plus an interactive game where guests can have the chance to try on Iron Man's armor. Iron Man Experience sees guests assist Iron Man in defeating Hydra throughout Hong Kong, and opened on January 11, 2017.

In March 2018, the Walt Disney Company announced a new Marvel-themed area inspired by the MCU to Hong Kong Disneyland and a new attraction where guests team up with Ant-Man and the Wasp, to join Iron Man Experience. Inspired by Ant-Man and the Wasp, Ant-Man and The Wasp: Nano Battle! is an enclosed interactive dark ride that sees guests use laser-powered weapons to team up with Ant-Man and the Wasp to defeat Arnim Zola and his army of Hydra swarm bots. Ant Man and the Wasp: Nano Battle! replaces the Buzz Lightyear Astro Blasters ride, and opened on March 31, 2019.

==== Disney California Adventure ====
By San Diego Comic-Con 2016, the Tower of Terror at Disney California Adventure was set to be replaced by a new attraction, Guardians of the Galaxy – Mission: Breakout!. Chris Pratt, Zoë Saldaña, Dave Bautista and Benicio del Toro all filmed exclusive footage for the attraction, reprising their roles as Peter Quill / Star-Lord, Gamora, Drax and Taneleer Tivan / The Collector, respectively. James Gunn, director of Guardians of the Galaxy and its sequel, directed footage for the attraction and consulted on all aspects of it. Guardians of the Galaxy – Mission: Breakout! sees visitors assisting Rocket in rescuing the other Guardians from the Collector's fortress, while the attraction features randomized events throughout the experience and music inspired by the Awesome Mix Vol. 1 soundtrack. The attraction opened on May 27, 2017.

In March 2018, the Walt Disney Company announced a new Marvel-themed area inspired by the MCU at Disney California Adventure, anchored by Mission: Breakout!, that features characters from the MCU, such as Iron Man and Spider-Man, joining the Guardians of the Galaxy in a "completely immersive superhero universe". The area replaced "A Bug's Land", which closed in mid-2018 to begin construction of the Marvel area. Tom Holland reprises his role as Peter Parker / Spider-Man in the attraction Web Slingers: A Spider-Man Adventure, in which Parker has set up W.E.B. (the Worldwide Engineers Brigade) to inspire a new generation to use technology to save the world. Riders are recruited by Spider-Man into the initiative to stop his malfunctioning Spider-Bots. Web Slingers was directed by Spider-Man director Jon Watts along with Brett Strong, and was written by Steven Spiegel and featured visual effects by Framestore.

A one-act version of Rogers: The Musical premiered at the Hyperion Theater on June 30, 2023, and ran for a limited time until August 31. Two new attractions, Avengers Infinity Defense and Stark Flight Lab, feature Downey reprising his role as Tony Stark along with additional returning MCU actors. Both rides are expected to open in 2028.

==== Walt Disney Studios Park ====
In March 2018, the Walt Disney Company announced a new Marvel-themed area inspired by the MCU to Disneyland Paris' Walt Disney Studios Park. The area includes a reimagined attraction where riders team up with Iron Man and other Avengers on a "hyper-kinetic adventure" on July 20, 2022. The park also hosted the "Summer of Super Heroes" live-action stage show from June to September 2018.

=== Disney cruises ===
In July 2021, the immersive family dining experience "Avengers: Quantum Encounter" at the Worlds of Marvel restaurant on the Disney Wish cruise ship was announced, which debuted when the cruise began voyages on July 14, 2022. The experience takes place during dinner with interactive elements and a full CGI recreation of the Wish's upper decks. Paul Rudd, Evangeline Lilly, Anthony Mackie, Brie Larson, Kerry Condon, and Iman Vellani reprised their MCU roles, while Ross Marquand voiced Ultron after previously doing so in What If...?, in which he replaced James Spader. Chris Waitt directed Rudd and Lilly's content, which was written by Steven Spiegel and featured visual effects by Framestore. The Marvels director Nia DaCosta filmed Vellani and Larson's content in London ahead of principal photography for the film.

In September 2023, the Wish's sister ship the Disney Treasure was announced to also include the Worlds of Marvel restaurant with two nights of distinct shows and menus, featuring an appearance by Spider-Man. The Marvel Super Hero Academy is also included on the cruise, where young kids can train to be superheroes with Spider-Man, Black Panther, and Ant-Man. These were available on the Treasure when it began voyages on December 21, 2024.

=== Other live attractions ===
==== Avengers S.T.A.T.I.O.N. ====
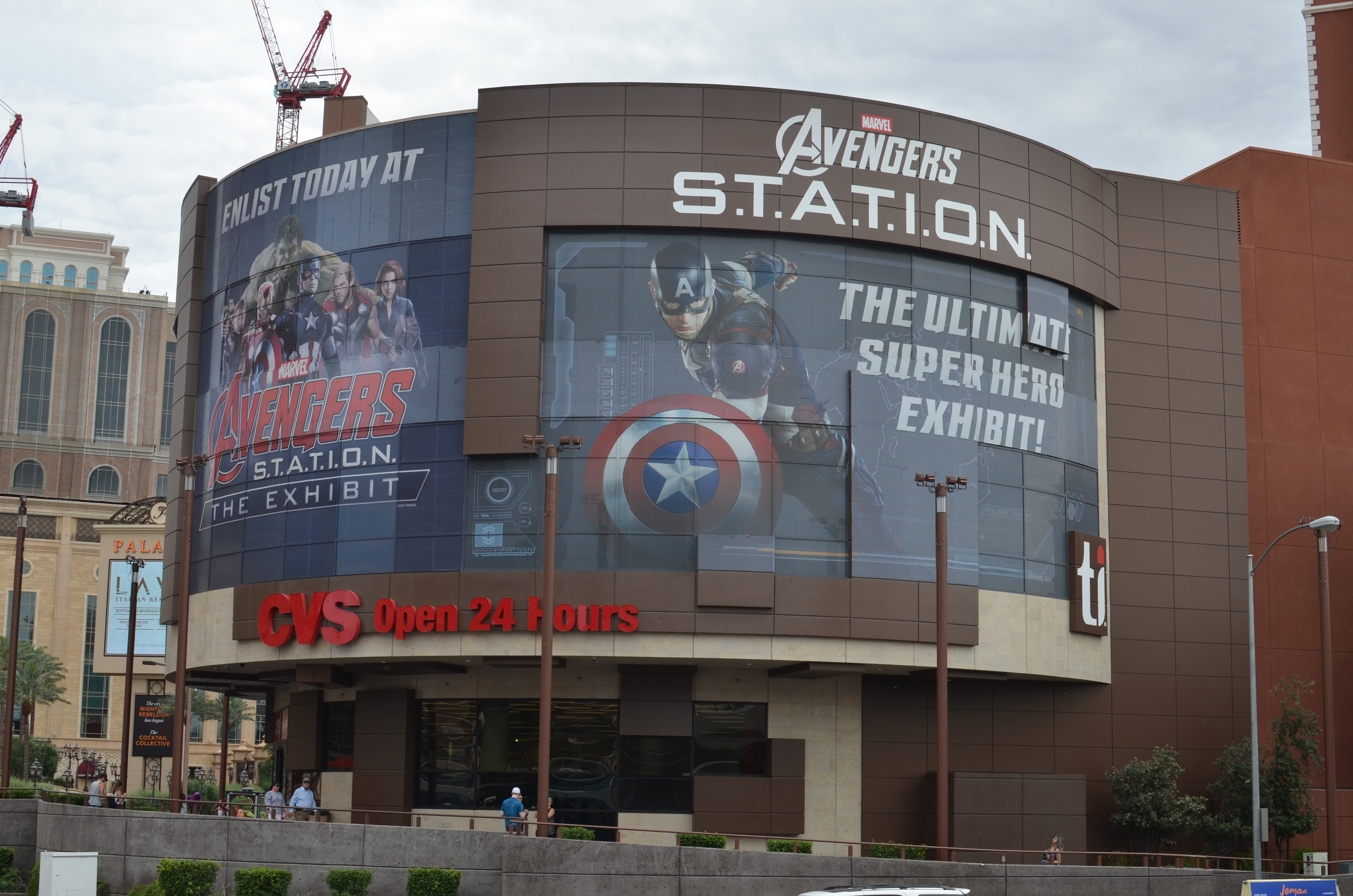
An Avengers S.T.A.T.I.O.N in Las Vegas

In May 2014, the Avengers S.T.A.T.I.O.N. (Scientific Training and Tactical Intelligence Operative Network) exhibit opened at the Discovery Times Square center. The exhibit features replica set pieces and props from the films, mixed with interactive technology and information, crafted through a partnership with NASA and other scientists. Titus Welliver also provides a "debrief" to visitors, reprising his role as S.H.I.E.L.D. agent Felix Blake. Created by Victory Hill Exhibits, Avengers S.T.A.T.I.O.N. cost $7.5 million to create, and ran through early September 2015.

The exhibit also opened in South Korea at the War Memorial of Korea in April 2015, in Paris, France, at Esplanade de La Défense a year later, and in Las Vegas at the Treasure Island Hotel and Casino in June 2016. The Las Vegas version of the exhibit featured updated character details and corresponding science to incorporate the Marvel films that were released since the original exhibit in New York. Additionally, the Las Vegas version features Cobie Smulders reprising her role as Maria Hill to "debrief" visitors, replacing Welliver.

==== GOMA exhibit ====
An art exhibit, titled Marvel: Creating the Cinematic Universe, was displayed exclusively at the Queensland Gallery of Modern Art (GOMA) in Brisbane, Australia, in 2017. The exhibit, which included "300 plus objects, films, costumes, drawings and other ephemera", featured content "from the collection of Marvel Studios and Marvel Entertainment and private collections" with "significant focus [given] to the creative artists who translate the drawn narrative to the screen through production design and storyboarding, costume and prop design, and special effects and post-production". Marvel: Creating the Cinematic Universe was also extended to GOMA's Australian Cinémathèque with a retrospective of the MCU films.

==== Avengers: Damage Control ====
In October 2019, Marvel Studios and ILMxLAB announced the virtual reality experience Avengers: Damage Control. The experience was available for a limited time starting in mid-October 2019 at select Void VR locations. Avengers: Damage Control sees players taking control of one of Shuri's Emergency Response Suits–which combine Wakandan and Stark Industries technologies–to defeat a threat alongside Doctor Strange, Ant-Man, and the Wasp. Letitia Wright, Benedict Cumberbatch, Paul Rudd, and Evangeline Lilly all reprise their MCU roles, while Ross Marquand voices Ultron, replacing James Spader. The experience was extended to the end of 2019.

=== Marvel Studios' Infinity Saga Concert Experience ===
In May 2024, Marvel Studios' Infinity Saga Concert Experience was announced by Disney Concerts, Marvel Studios, and the Los Angeles Philharmonic, to premiere on August 30 and 31, 2024, at the Hollywood Bowl. The concert, conducted by the Philharmonic's Music and Artistic director Gustavo Dudamel, features the Philharmonic performing a "specially created score" of music from the Infinity Saga films, such as The Avengers theme and "Portals" from Avengers: Endgame, live to picture. The first half of the concert focused on individual characters from the films, while the second half centered on Avengers: Infinity War and Avengers: Endgame. A "post-credits scene" saw the Philharmonic play Michael Giacchino's theme from The Fantastic Four: First Steps (2025). The performance also used projection mapping on the proscenium of the Hollywood Bowl while audience members wore PixMob light-up wristbands. The concert was set to go on tour globally in 2025.

=== Live-action specials ===
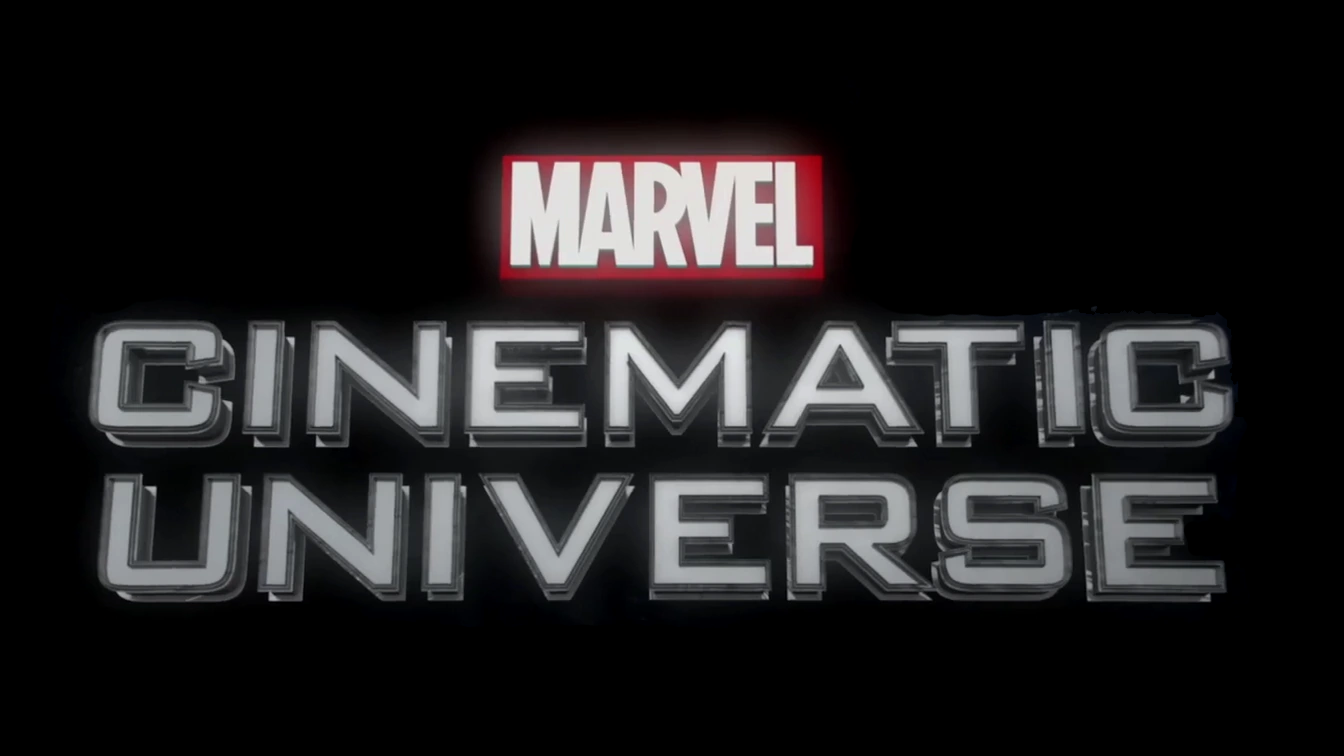
The Marvel Cinematic Universe intertitle from Marvel Studios: Assembling a Universe (2014)

On March 18, 2014, ABC aired a one-hour television special titled Marvel Studios: Assembling a Universe, which documented the history of Marvel Studios and the development of the Marvel Cinematic Universe and included exclusive interviews and behind-the-scenes footage from all of the films, One-Shots, and Agents of S.H.I.E.L.D., and sneak peeks of Avengers: Age of Ultron, Captain America: The Winter Soldier, Guardians of the Galaxy, unaired episodes of Agents of S.H.I.E.L.D., and Ant-Man. Brian Lowry of Variety felt the special, "contains a pretty interesting business and creative story. While it might all make sense in hindsight, there was appreciable audacity in Marvel's plan to release five loosely connected movies from the same hero-filled world, beginning with the cinematically unproven Iron Man and culminating with superhero team The Avengers. As such, this fast-moving hour qualifies as more than just a cut-and-paste job from electronic press kits, although there's an element of that, certainly." The special was released on September 9, 2014, through the home media for Agents of S.H.I.E.L.D. season 1.

In September 2014, Agents of S.H.I.E.L.D. executive producer Jeffrey Bell stated that to meet production demands and avoid having to air repeat episodes, ABC would likely air a Marvel special in place of a regular installment at some point during the first ten episodes of Agents of S.H.I.E.L.D.'s second season. In October, the special was revealed to be Marvel 75 Years: From Pulp to Pop!, which was hosted by Emily VanCamp, who portrays Agent 13 in Captain America: The Winter Soldier, and aired on November 4, 2014. The special features behind the scenes footage from Avengers: Age of Ultron and Ant-Man, as well as footage from the Agent Carter television series previously screened at New York Comic Con. Brian Lowry of Variety felt an hour for the special did not "do the topic justice" adding, "For anyone who has seen more than one Marvel movie but would shrug perplexedly at the mention of Jack Kirby or Steve Ditko, Marvel 75 Years: From Pulp To Pop! should probably be required viewing. Fun, fast-paced and encompassing many of the company's highlights along with a few lowlights, it's a solid primer on Marvel's history, while weaving in inevitable self-promotion and synergistic plugs." Eric Goldman of IGN also wished the special had been longer, adding, "Understandably, the more you already know about Marvel, the less you'll be surprised by Marvel 75 Years: From Pulp to Pop!, but it's important to remember who this special is really made for – a mainstream audience who have embraced the Marvel characters, via the hugely successful movies, in a way no one could have imagined."

The special Marvel Studios: Expanding the Universe was released on Disney+ on November 12, 2019. It features a look at the original MCU TV series for Disney+, with interviews and concept art. A Marvel-themed orchestra performance of an extended version of Brian Tyler's Marvel Studios theme and Alan Silvestri's theme from The Avengers took place during China's Bilibili New Year's Gala on December 31, 2020, to promote the 2021 Marvel Studios film releases. A special titled Marvel Studios' 2021 Disney+ Day Special, which looked at the future of the MCU on Disney+, was released on the service on November 12, 2021, as part of its "Disney+ Day" celebration.

=== Documentary series ===
Marvel Studios: Legends and Marvel Studios: Assembled are documentary series for Disney+ that premiered on January 8 and March 12, 2021, respectively. Legends examines individual characters and features using footage from previous MCU media and how they connect ahead of the stories featuring them throughout the Multiverse Saga, while Assembled features "making of" specials that go behind the scenes of the MCU films and television series with cast members and additional creatives. Specials for the latter were released through Marvel Studios's 2024 projects.

Voices Rising: The Music of Wakanda Forever is a three-part documentary series detailing the creation process of the soundtrack for Black Panther: Wakanda Forever (2022). It premiered on Disney+ on February 28, 2023. The documentary series was originally scheduled to be removed from Disney+ on May 26, 2023, as part of Disney's efforts to reduce content costs, but it was ultimately decided to remain on the service at that time.

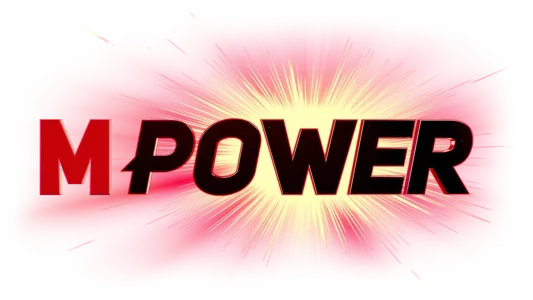

MPower is a four-part documentary series highlighting the actresses and behind-the-scenes female creatives behind the MCU, alongside fans who applied to participate in the series. It premiered on March 8, 2023, for International Women's Day, The episodes "The Women of Black Panther", "Captain Marvel", "Scarlet Witch", and "Gamora" respectively featured interviews from MCU actresses Danai Gurira, Lupita Nyong'o, Florence Kasumba, and Letitia Wright; Brie Larson, Iman Vellani, and Teyonah Parris; Elizabeth Olsen, Kathryn Hahn, and Kat Dennings; and Zoë Saldaña, as well as Marvel Studios executive Trinh Tran, Black Panther costume designer Ruth E. Carter, production designer Hannah Beachler, and editor Debbie Berman. Saldaña and Victoria Alonso were executive producers of the series, which was produced by Herzog & Co., Saldaña's production company Cinestar Pictures, and Just Entertainment. Saldaña said the series was a tribute to the representation and empowerment of women with the intent to "ignite meaningful conversations and drive real change towards a more equal and inclusive world." The documentary series was originally scheduled to be removed from Disney+ on May 26, 2023, as part of Disney's efforts to reduce content costs, but it was ultimately decided to remain on the service at that time. BJ Conagelo of /Film stated it was "fantastic to see a thoughtful and in-depth spotlight" of the work by diverse groups of women in the MCU, and found it was "equally as impressive" how much the series analyzed their impact as a "sincere assessment" of the importance of the stories beyond gender representation. Conversely, Kai Young of Screen Rant was critical of the series's lack of an episode for Scarlett Johansson's Natasha Romanoff / Black Widow.

=== Literary material ===
In September 2015, Marvel announced the Guidebook to the Marvel Cinematic Universe, named as a nod to the Official Handbook of the Marvel Universe. Each guidebook is compiled by Mike O'Sullivan and the Official Handbook of the Marvel Universe team, with cover art from Mike del Mundo and Pascal Campion, and features facts about the MCU films, film-to-comic comparisons, and production stills. The guidebooks released each month from October 2015 to January 2016 were Guidebook to the Marvel Cinematic Universe: Marvel's Iron Man, Guidebook to the Marvel Cinematic Universe: Marvel's Incredible Hulk / Marvel's Iron Man 2, Guidebook to the Marvel Cinematic Universe: Marvel's Thor, and Guidebook to the Marvel Cinematic Universe: Marvel's Captain America: The First Avenger.

In November 2018, Marvel and Titan Publishing Group released Marvel Studios: The First Ten Years to celebrate the first ten years of the MCU. It features cast interviews, in-depth sections on each film, and an Easter egg guide. In October 2021, a two-volume book The Story of Marvel Studios: The Making of the Marvel Cinematic Universe was released, written by Tara Bennett and Paul Terry. This collection features a look at the evolution of Marvel Studios, personal stories from the 23-film "Infinity Saga", and interviews with cast and crew members.

In April 2023, W. W. Norton & Company announced MCU: The Reign of Marvel Studios by Joanna Robinson, Dave Gonzales, and Gavin Edwards, for release on October 10, 2023. The book presents an unauthorized look at "the rise and uncertain reign of the MCU, analyzing Marvel Studios' place as a major player in Hollywood and global pop culture" from Marvel Studios' inception, through events in early 2023, conducted through numerous interviews with those closely associated with the MCU. Norton approached the writers in 2019 to work on a book centered on the MCU. Robinson explained that the book was originally meant to be an oral history, until Disney was no longer enthused about the book's publication despite initially being open to it, and told current employees and former stars not to talk to the writers. The writers were able to supplement the interviews they were able to get with those from "cultural critics and comics experts" in addition to years of research. Robinson added that because of the long work put into the book, it was able to cover the studio's expansion to television on Disney+, as well as "this current state of what I like to call a 'wobble' in Marvel's long reign", and provide "a lot of answers about how we got here". Additionally, the book was not deterred by the then-recent firings of Alonso and Marvel Entertainment CEO Ike Perlmutter, needing only "a few cosmetic tweaks to weave the whole story together" with Robinson explaining those firings "actually reinforced our sense that we really had captured the story of Marvel in both its triumphs and its stumbling blocks". Robinson was able to interview many of the subjects while Gonazles did the majority of the book's research, with Edwards compiling it all to give the book a "flow".

In February 2024, Abrams Books announced Marvel Studios: The Art of Ryan Meinerding, written by Bennett and Terry. The book includes over 500 illustrations by Marvel Studios' head of visual development and character design, Ryan Meinerding, from work-in-progress to completed pieces, along with interview material in which Meinerding discusses his process and his work in Marvel Studios' visual development department. It was released on October 1, 2024.

=== Video game tie-ins ===
Video games of the Marvel Cinematic Universe
Title	U.S. release date	Publisher	Developer	Platforms
Iron Man	May 2, 2008	Sega	Secret Level Artificial Mind and Movement Hands-On Mobile	PlayStation 3 and Xbox 360 PlayStation 2, Wii, Microsoft Windows, Nintendo DS, and PlayStation Portable Various mobile devices
The Incredible Hulk	June 5, 2008	Sega	Edge of Reality Amaze Entertainment Hands-On Mobile	PlayStation 2, PlayStation 3, Xbox 360, Microsoft Windows, and Wii Nintendo DS (version) Various mobile devices
Iron Man 2	May 4, 2010	Sega	Sega Studios San Francisco High Voltage Software Griptonite Games	PlayStation 3 and Xbox 360 Wii and PlayStation Portable Nintendo DS
Iron Man 2	May 4, 2010	Gameloft		iOS and BlackBerry
Thor: God of Thunder	May 3, 2011	Sega	Liquid Entertainment Red Fly Studio WayForward Technologies	PlayStation 3 and Xbox 360 Wii and Nintendo 3DS Nintendo DS
Captain America: Super Soldier	July 19, 2011	Sega	Next Level Games High Voltage Software Graphite Games	PlayStation 3 and Xbox 360 Wii and Nintendo 3DS Nintendo DS
The Avengers: The Mobile Game	May 2, 2012	Gameloft		iOS, Android, and Blackberry
Iron Man 3: The Official Game	April 25, 2013	Gameloft		iOS and Android
Thor: The Dark World – The Official Game	October 31, 2013	Gameloft		iOS and Android
Captain America: The Winter Soldier – The Official Game	March 27, 2014	Gameloft		iOS, Android, and Windows Phone
Lego Marvel's Avengers	January 26, 2016	Warner Bros. Interactive; Entertainment	TT Games	PlayStation 4, Xbox One, Microsoft Windows, PlayStation 3, Xbox 360, Wii U, Nintendo 3DS, and PlayStation Vita
Lego Marvel's Avengers	March 10, 2016	Feral Interactive	TT Games	macOS
Spider-Man: Homecoming – Virtual Reality Experience	June 30, 2017	Sony Pictures; Virtual Reality	CreateVR	PlayStation VR, HTC Vive, and Oculus Rift
Spider-Man: Far From Home – Virtual Reality Experience	June 25, 2019	Sony Pictures; Virtual Reality	CreateVR	PlayStation VR, HTC Vive, and Oculus Rift
What If...? – An Immersive Story	May 30, 2024	Apple	ILM Immersive	Apple Vision Pro

=== A Mini Marvel ===
In February 2016, a commercial for Coca-Cola mini cans aired during Super Bowl 50. A Mini Marvel was created by Wieden+Kennedy for Coca-Cola through a partnership with Marvel, and was directed by the Russo brothers. In the ad, Ant-Man (voiced by Paul Rudd, reprising his role) and the Hulk first fight, and then bond, over a Coke mini can. Luma Pictures provided visual effects for the spot, having worked previously with the two characters in MCU films. For the Hulk, Luma redefined its previous muscular system and simulation process to create and render the character, while Ant-Man received new motion capture. The Super Bowl campaign extended to "limited-edition Coke mini cans [six packs] that are emblazoned with images of Marvel characters, including Hulk, Ant-Man, Black Widow, [Falcon, Iron Man] and Captain America." Consumers had the opportunity to purchase the cans by finding hidden clues in the commercial, though "if the program goes well, Coke will consider making the cans available in stores." The ad had the third most social media activity of all the film-related trailers that aired during the game, and was nominated for Outstanding Visual Effects in a Commercial at the 15th Visual Effects Society Awards.

=== The Good, the Bart, and the Loki ===
In June 2021, The Simpsons short film The Good, the Bart, and the Loki was announced, which was released alongside "Journey into Mystery", the fifth episode of Loki on Disney+. The short sees Loki teaming up with Bart Simpson in a crossover that pays homage to the characters of the MCU. Hiddleston reprises his role as Loki in the short.

== See also ==
- Marvel Universe – original Marvel Comics shared universe
  - Ultimate Marvel – Marvel Comics imprint similar to the MCU
- Marvel Animated Features – series of animated films originated by Marvel Studios
- Features of the Marvel Cinematic Universe
