= Alan Fine (executive) =

American businessman

- Education: University of Rhode Island
- Occupation: Businessman
- Employer: Marvel Entertainment (1996–2019)

Alan Fine is an American businessman who worked at Marvel Entertainment from 1996 until 2019. He was a chief executive and later its president who worked alongside its former CEO Isaac Perlmutter and chaired the Marvel Creative Committee.

== Early life and education ==
Fine attended the University of Rhode Island to receive a Bachelor of Arts degree.

== Career ==
Fine later became the senior vice president of marketing for Coleco Toys. At Caldor, A division of The May Department Stores Company, he held the positions of vice president and the Seasonal Merchandise Division manager. Fine later joined the management at Kay-Bee Toys as senior vice president and general merchandise manager, then was promoted to president and chief operating officer. In 1996, Fine became employed by Marvel Entertainment Group. Fine became the Toy Biz divisional chief executive officer in 1998 under the newly merged Marvel Enterprises. Marvel Publishing chief executive officer was added to his portfolio in 2004. For Marvel Characters, Inc., the licensing unit of Marvel, he was executive vice president and chief marketing officer. In April 2009, Fine was promoted to executive vice president, Office of the Chief Executive, joining David Maisel, John Turitzin, and Isaac Perlmutter, Marvel CEO in overseeing all operations. Fine also chaired Marvel's Creative Committee. Fine was later promoted to president, Marvel Entertainment. Fine was later reported to have left Marvel following disputes with Kevin Feige.
