= John Turitzin =

- Born: September 5, 1955 (age 70)
- Education: Earlham College; NYU School of Law; Princeton
- Occupation: Lawyer
- Employer: Marvel Entertainment

John Turitzin is a lawyer and former corporate executive at Marvel Entertainment.

== Early life ==
John Turitzin was born on September 5, 1955. He attended and graduated from Earlham College in 1977. In 1981, he graduated from NYU School of Law and Princeton University with a master's degree in public affairs.

== Career ==
After graduating in 1981, he became an associate at Cahill Gordon & Reindel in New York. Later, he was a partner at the law firm Battle Fowler. In 2000, Battle Fowler merged into Paul Hastings Janofsky & Walker, later Paul Hastings LLP, and he became Marvel Enterprises' outside counsel.

Beginning March 4, 2004, Turitzin served as a number of executive roles at Marvel Entertainment, including Marvel's Executive Vice President and General Counsel. In February 2006, he was appointed to Chief Administrative Officer. In 2006, he was appointed Executive Vice President, Office of the Chief Executive together with David Maisel, and Isaac Perlmutter (CEO).

During his tenure at Marvel Entertainment, Turitzin played a key role in the establishment of Marvel Studios, as well as the expansion of the Marvel Cinematic Universe. He remained Chief Counsel of Marvel Entertainment after its acquisition by The Walt Disney Company in December 2009.

In 2023, following a proxy fight waged by Nelson Peltz and Isaac Perlmutter regarding management of The Walt Disney Company, Marvel Entertainment’s parent company, Turitzin was fired from Marvel Entertainment along with Isaac Perlmutter.

Turitzin continues to perform legal work for Isaac Perlmutter, a close friend and advisor to Donald Trump.
