= Isaac Perlmutter =

Israeli-American businessman (born 1942)

- יצחק פרלמוטר
- Born: December 1, 1942 (age 83); Mandatory Palestine
- Occupation: Investor
- Spouse: Laura Perlmutter

Isaac "Ike" Perlmutter (Hebrew: יצחק "אייק" פרלמוטר; born December 1, 1942) is an Israeli-American billionaire businessman and financier. Through a variety of sometimes unorthodox business deals, he has been an influential investor in a number of corporations, including Revco drug stores, Coleco Entertainment, Remington, and Toy Biz/Marvel Toys. He is the former chairman and CEO of Marvel Entertainment. He has a political relationship with Donald Trump, and acted as an unofficial advisor in his presidential administration, overseeing the Department of Veterans Affairs.

== Early life ==
Isaac Perlmutter was born to a Jewish family in Mandatory Palestine in 1942. He served in the Israel Defense Forces during the Six-Day War of 1967.

He emigrated to America, arriving in New York City, and he earned a living standing outside Jewish cemeteries in Brooklyn, leveraging his Hebrew skills to lead funeral services for tips. Later he sold toys and beauty products on the streets of New York City, which eventually evolved into selling surplus stock and end-of-line items at a profit. Although he never attended a university, he taught himself how to read a balance sheet and worked at spotting overlooked value in weak and distressed companies.

== Career ==
=== Revco ===
With a new partner, Bernard Marden, and leveraging the skills he attained as a wholesaler, he formed a company called Odd Lot Trading, a wholesaler and retailer of closeout items. In May 1984, they sold Odd Lot to Revco Discount Drug Stores in exchange for 12% of Revco stock. He soon challenged Revco management for control of the company but, after initial positive feedback, was rejected. Perlmutter and his partner threatened a hostile takeover but eventually refrained and sold their share back to Revco for $120 million.

=== Coleco ===
Perlmutter had a close relationship with the management of toy manufacturer Coleco Entertainment Corporation as he had been purchasing unsold inventory from them for some time. As is typical in the industry, payment terms were often unusual. With Coleco, Perlmutter would purchase unsold inventory in exchange for 50% cash and 50% in "barter advertising credits" (basically a promise to pay for the future advertising expenses of Coleco). Over a four-year period, Perlmutter had received $144 million in goods and paid $73 million in cash along with providing $71 million in barter advertising credits to be paid in the future.

In 1988, he saw an opportunity as Coleco struggled under its debt due to the advent of the personal computer which impacted the sale of video games. Perlmutter bought all of Coleco's senior debt (with $85 million in face value) for $50 million, a substantial discount, becoming senior to their bondholders in the event of a bankruptcy. Although Perlmutter believed that a Coleco bankruptcy was probable, he also believed that the value of the Coleco's assets should be sufficient to cover the full $85 million in value that he had purchased. In July 1988, Coleco filed for Chapter 11 bankruptcy. The bondholders, suspicious over Perlmutter's close relationship with Coleco's management, sued Perlmutter alleging fraudulent conveyance over the barter advertising credits (which made up a very significant item on Coleco's balance sheet). After extensive negotiation, a settlement was reached whereby Coleco would be sold to Hasbro Corporation for $85 million and Perlmutter would accept $64 million for his now $90 million claim (principal plus interest) in exchange for the withdrawal of the lawsuit.

=== Remington ===
In 1994, Victor Kiam sold controlling interest of Remington Products to Isaac Perlmutter. Perlmutter became Vice President of Remington. Kiam and Perlmutter sold Remington to Vestar Capital Partners in 1996.

=== Marvel ===
Isaac Perlmutter was a member of the board of directors of Marvel Comics beginning in April 1993 and was chairman of the board until March 1995.

Isaac Perlmutter was co-owner with Avi Arad of Toy Biz (later Marvel Toys), after purchasing its predecessor company from Charan Industries in January 1990. Toy Biz was reorganized in the Marvel deal, with Perlmutter continuing to own the original Toy Biz as a holding company named Zib, which held its foreign sales affiliate Toy Biz International and Perlmutter's share of the new Toy Biz.

When the Marvel Group went bankrupt in 1996, protracted legal battles over control of the company followed between Perlmutter, Arad, Carl Icahn, and Ronald Perelman. By 1997, Perlmutter and Arad had established control over the company, pushing out Icahn and Perelman. ToyBiz and Marvel were merged into Marvel Enterprises to bring it out of bankruptcy in June 1998, with ToyBiz becoming a division of the new company.

In November 2001, Perlmutter became vice chairman of Marvel. He became the chief executive officer of Marvel Comics in January 2005. He remained CEO of Marvel Entertainment after its acquisition by The Walt Disney Company in December 2009. Although Perlmutter received $800 million in cash and $590 million in Disney stock after the acquisition, he did not take a seat on Disney's board of directors.

In September 2015, Perlmutter stopped overseeing the development of Marvel Studios. Disney felt studio head Kevin Feige should report directly to the chair of The Walt Disney Studios, Alan Horn, so that all cinematic properties of Disney (including Pixar and Lucasfilm) were under one management structure. The restructuring was reportedly due to Feige's "frustration" of working with Perlmutter as well as alleged comments and actions by Perlmutter, such as replacing Terrence Howard – who wanted more money to continue playing James Rhodes – with Don Cheadle, arguing that black people "look the same." Perlmutter's sidelining coincided with a notable increase in Marvel Studios' focus on diversity and inclusiveness. Jeph Loeb, who oversaw Marvel Television and the television properties of the Marvel Cinematic Universe, still reported to Perlmutter up until 2019.

In March 2023, Perlmutter was laid off from his position running Marvel Entertainment, as part of a restructuring to fold the division's operations into Disney proper. Perlmutter retained his shares in Disney, which he used to back Nelson Peltz's campaign to claim a seat on the Disney board. After losing the proxy fight in April 2024, Perlmutter sold all 25.6 million of his shares in the following months.

== Philanthropy ==
In 1993, Perlmutter and his wife established the Laura and Isaac Perlmutter Professorship and chair in Cell Biology at the Skirball Institute of Biomolecular Medicine (part of the New York University School of Medicine). Perlmutter's wife Laura has served as a trustee on the NYU Medical Center's Board of Trustees since 1993 and Perlmutter has served as a trustee since 2014.

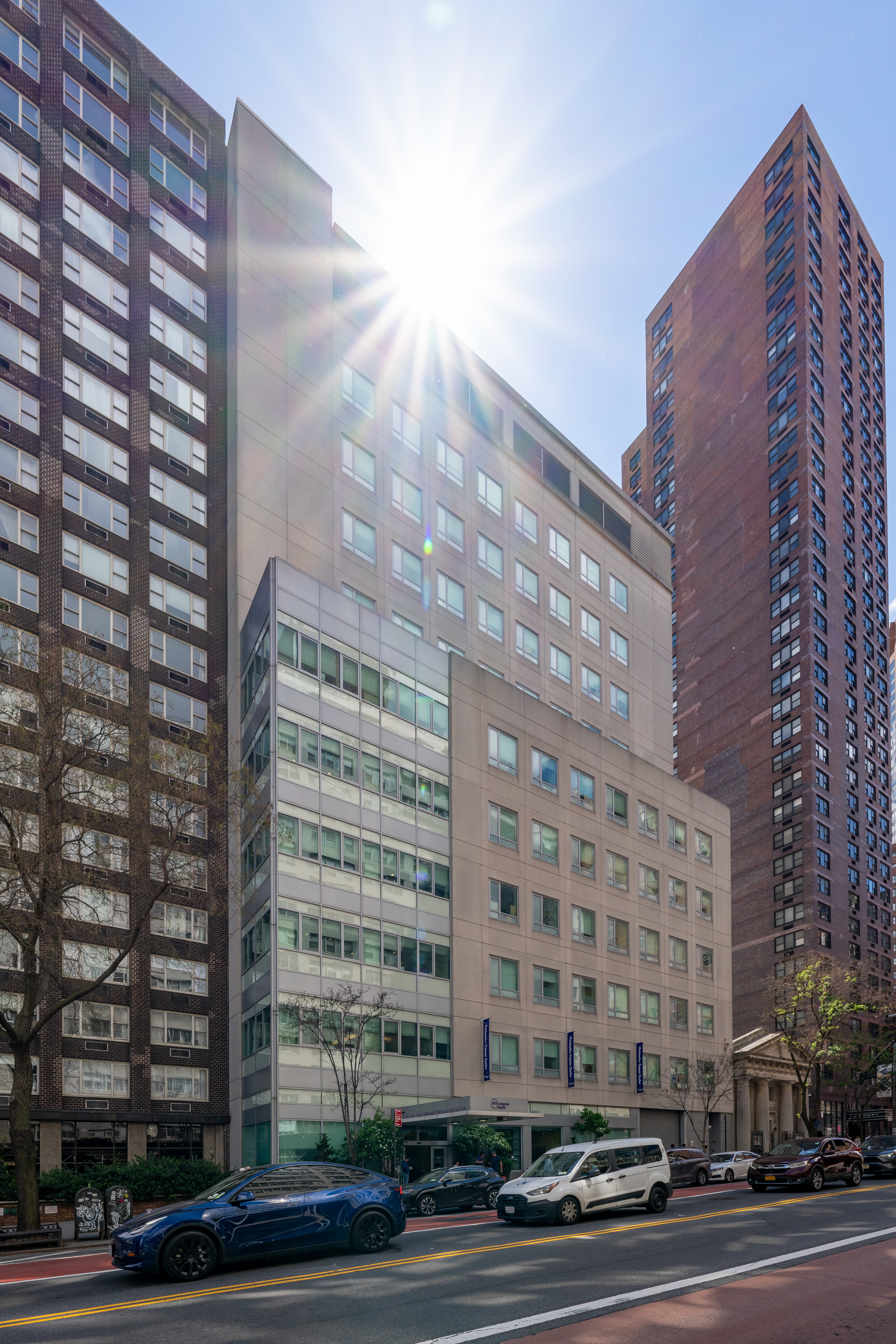
Perlmutter Cancer Center (2026)

Isaac and Laura Perlmutter are major contributors to NYU Langone Medical Center. In January 2014, the couple made a $50 million gift from their foundation to establish the Laura and Isaac Perlmutter Cancer Center at NYU Langone, followed by a $5 million gift from their foundation to establish the Laura and Isaac Perlmutter Cosmetic Plastic Surgery Center at NYU Langone, a $9 million gift to fund cancer research at NYU Langone and the Technion – Israel Institute of Technology, and a $1 million gift to support the medical center's Beatrice W. Welters Breast Health Outreach and Navigation Program.

In the spring of 2020, in response to the COVID-19 pandemic, Isaac and Laura Perlmutter took part in funding the donation of an estimated 50 tons of food to the Palm Beach County Food Bank. In addition to the food bank, the couple contributed to providing meals to the staff at both Good Samaritan Medical Center and St. Mary's Medical Center, as well as five hospitals in New York City.

Issac and Laura Perlmutter are also supporters and contributors to The Innocence Project which exonerates the wrongly convicted through DNA testing and reforms the criminal justice system to prevent future injustice.

In 2022, the Laura and Isaac Perlmutter Foundation donated $15 million to the Benjamin N. Cardozo School of Law at Yeshiva University to establish the Perlmutter Center for Legal Justice. The center trains lawyers in the proper use of forensic evidence, with a focus on wrongful convictions linked to misapplied forensic science, building on Cardozo’s existing Forensic Science College. It has two components: the Perlmutter Freedom Clinic, a student-staffed clinic that litigates wrongful-conviction cases involving misused scientific evidence and pursues clemency for people serving lengthy sentences; and the Perlmutter Forensic Science Education Program, a continuing-education program on scientific evidence for practicing attorneys.

== Political involvement ==
In 2015, Laura Perlmutter donated $2 million to a super-PAC supporting the presidential candidacy of Sen. Marco Rubio.

In January 2016, according to Donald Trump, Isaac intended to donate $1 million to the presidential candidate's wounded veterans initiative at Drake University.

On June 30, 2016, Laura Perlmutter donated $449,400 to a PAC supporting Donald Trump, and later was part of Trump's Inauguration committee.

In 2019, Ike and Laura Perlmutter donated roughly $360,000 to the "Trump Victory Joint Fundraising Committee." In total, they contributed $1.9 million to Donald Trump's 2020 presidential campaign. In 2024, Issac and Linda Perlmutter donated $10 million to the newly formed Right for America super-PAC led by Sergio Gor in support of the Trump campaign.

In 2025, the Laura and Issac Perlmutter Foundation was one of the donors who funded the White House's East Wing demolition, and planned building of a ballroom.

=== Leadership at the Department of Veterans Affairs ===
In April 2017, Perlmutter was categorized by The New York Times as one of the "Clubgoers" among twenty people whom President Trump consults "outside the White House gates". He "has been informally advising ... on veterans issues [and] ... has been a presence" at Mar-a-Lago, according to the account.

In August 2018 non-profit news organization ProPublica reported that Trump had informally authorized three members of his Mar-a-Lago club to direct policy at the United States Department of Veterans Affairs (VA) and issue instructions to Secretary of Veterans Affairs Peter O'Rourke. Perlmutter was named among the three, collectively known as the Mar-a-Lago Crowd. The author of the article obtained "hundreds of documents" through the Freedom of Information Act that show the three were in daily contact with the agency, "reviewing all manner of policy and personnel decisions" and that "they prodded the VA to start new programs, and officials travelled to Mar-a-Lago at taxpayer expense to hear their views." VA staffers have claimed that the three men got control over the department as "spoils" to reward them for their support of Trump. Their influence over the VA, including VA staff traveling to Mar-a-Lago to meet with them, carried on into 2019.

== Legal disputes ==
Isaac Perlmutter and his wife, Laura Perlmutter, were involved in litigation against their neighbor, Harold Peerenboom, in Palm Beach County, Florida. Tensions traced to a disagreement beginning in 2011 over management of the tennis courts at their shared residential community. In 2013, Peerenboom sued the Perlmutters, alleging they had orchestrated a campaign of anonymous letters accusing Peerenboom of sexual abuse and murder. The Perlmutters countersued, alleging that Peerenboom and his then-attorney, William Douberley, lured them to depositions in a different lawsuit to covertly obtain their DNA and link them to the hate mail. Laura Perlmutter further alleged that Peerenboom disseminated a distorted DNA test result to the media that falsely implicated her in the letter-writing campaign, including to The New York Times and The Globe and Mail.

On September 27, 2021, Palm Beach County Circuit Judge Cymonie Rowe granted the Perlmutters summary judgment on all counts of Peerenboom’s complaint against them. The court found that Peerenboom had conceded he had no admissible evidence linking the Perlmutters to the anonymous letters, writing that “there is no evidence whatsoever that the Perlmutters had any hand in those mailings” and that “no reasonable jury could find that the Perlmutters had any involvement in the Hate Mail campaign.”

On November 21, 2025, the jury awarded $50 million in damages to Laura Perlmutter for defamation, and additional damages to both Isaac and Laura Perlmutter for loss of enjoyment of life and humiliation stemming from abuse of process and civil conspiracy.

== Personal life ==
Early in his career, Perlmutter met his wife Laura J. Perlmutter at a Catskills resort and they married soon after. They divide their time between homes in Palm Beach, Florida close to Mar-a-Lago, and New York City.

Perlmutter had in the past taken great pride in never having given an interview in his career, despite being in the public eye due to his many court battles and bankruptcy fights. However, in 2023 he gave an interview to the Wall Street Journal upon his dismissal from Disney. He has rarely been spontaneously photographed.

== Companies ==
- Marvel Entertainment (formerly)
- Marvel Studios (formerly)
- Remington Products Company
- Odd Lot Incorporated, retail discount chain
- REC Sound Incorporated
- Classic Heroes, Inc., majority stockholder, an apparel manufacturing distributor
- Tangible Media
- Westwood Industries, Inc., table and floor lamps manufacturer and distributor
- Zib, Inc.

== See also ==
- List of Israeli Americans
- Avi Arad
