= List of Benedict Cumberbatch performances =

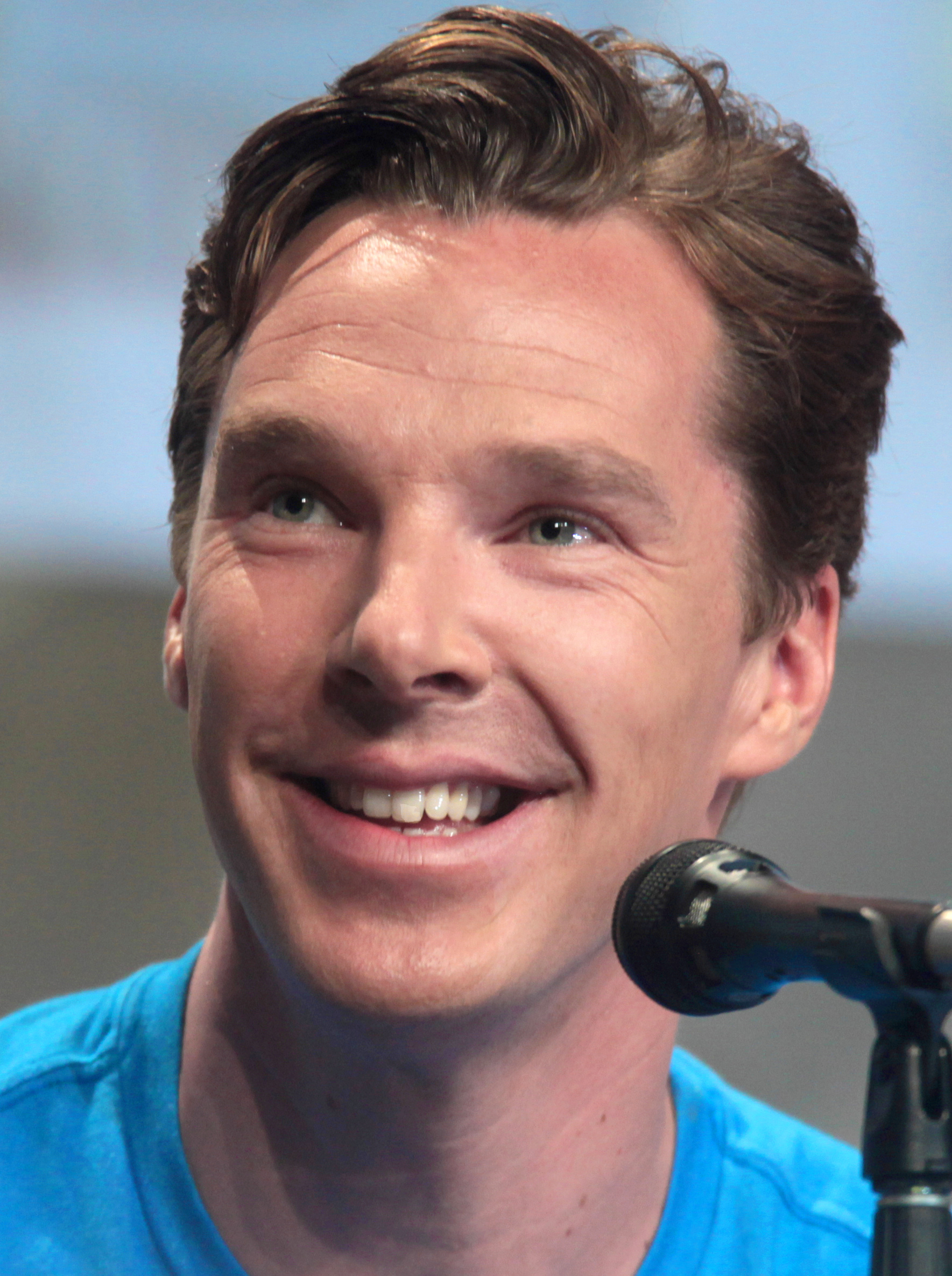
Cumberbatch at the 2014 San Diego Comic-Con

Actor Benedict Cumberbatch has performed in many films, television series, theatre productions, and recorded lines for various radio programs, narrations and video games. He first performed for the New Shakespeare Company at Open Air Theatre, Regent's Park for two seasons. He later portrayed George Tesman in Richard Eyre's revival of Hedda Gabler (2005). He played Captain Crieff in John Finnemore’s Cabin Pressure (radio series) (2008) and since then has starred in the Royal National Theatre productions After the Dance (2010) and Frankenstein (2011). In 2015, he played William Shakespeare's Hamlet at the Barbican Theatre.

His screen work includes television appearances in Heartbeat (2000), Silent Witness (2002) and Fortysomething (2003) before starring as Stephen Hawking in the television film Hawking (2004). He has played Sherlock Holmes in the crime drama series Sherlock since 2010. He has also starred in Tom Stoppard's adaptation of Parade's End (2012). He appeared in To Kill a King (2003) and he went on to appear in the films Atonement (2007) and Tinker Tailor Soldier Spy (2011). He has starred in the films Star Trek Into Darkness as Khan Noonien Singh (2013), 12 Years a Slave as William Prince Ford (2013), The Fifth Estate as Julian Assange (2013), and The Imitation Game as Alan Turing (2014). Through voice and motion capture, he played the characters of Smaug and The Necromancer in Peter Jackson's The Hobbit film series (2012–2014). He plays Dr. Stephen Strange in the Marvel Cinematic Universe (MCU), beginning with the release of Doctor Strange (2016) and reprised the role in Thor: Ragnarok (2017), Avengers: Infinity War (2018), Avengers: Endgame (2019), Spider-Man: No Way Home (2021), and Doctor Strange in the Multiverse of Madness (2022).

Benedict Cumberbatch has received various accolades throughout his career, including a British Academy Television Award, a Primetime Emmy Award, a Critics' Choice Television Award and a Laurence Olivier Award. He won the British Academy Television Award for Best Actor for playing the title role in the five-part drama miniseries Patrick Melrose. Cumberbatch won the Primetime Emmy Award for Outstanding Lead Actor for Sherlock and the Laurence Olivier Award for Best Actor for Frankenstein. His performances in the dramas The Imitation Game (2014) and The Power of the Dog (2021) earned him nominations for an Academy Award, a British Academy Film Award, a Screen Actors Guild Award, and a Golden Globe Award, all for Best Actor in a Leading Role.

== Film ==
| Year | Title | Role | Notes | Ref. |
|---|---|---|---|---|
| 2002 | Hills Like White Elephants | The Man | Short film | |
| 2003 | To Kill a King | Royalist | | |
| 2006 | Starter for 10 | Patrick Watts | | |
| 2006 | Amazing Grace | Prime Minister William Pitt | | |
| 2007 | Inseparable | Joe / Charlie | Short film | |
| 2007 | Atonement | Paul Marshall | | |
| 2008 | The Other Boleyn Girl | William Carey | | |
| 2009 | Creation | Joseph Dalton Hooker | | |
| 2009 | Burlesque Fairytales | Henry Clark | | |
| 2010 | Four Lions | Negotiator | | |
| 2010 | Third Star | James | | |
| 2010 | The Whistleblower | Nick Kaufman | | |
| 2011 | Tinker Tailor Soldier Spy | Peter Guillam | | |
| 2011 | Wreckers | David | | |
| 2011 | War Horse | Major Jamie Stewart | | |
| 2012 | Girlfriend in a Coma | Dante Alighieri (voice) | Documentary | |
| 2012 | The Hobbit: An Unexpected Journey | Smaug / The Necromancer | Motion capture and voices | |
| 2013 | Star Trek Into Darkness | Khan Noonien Singh | | |
| 2013 | Little Favour | Wallace | Short film; also producer | |
| 2013 | 12 Years a Slave | William Prince Ford | | |
| 2013 | The Fifth Estate | Julian Assange | | |
| 2013 | August: Osage County | "Little" Charles Aiken | | |
| 2013 | The Hobbit: The Desolation of Smaug | Smaug / Sauron | Motion capture and voices | |
| 2014 | The Imitation Game | Alan Turing | | |
| 2014 | Penguins of Madagascar | Classified | Voice | |
| 2014 | The Hobbit: The Battle of the Five Armies | Smaug / Sauron | Motion capture and voices | |
| 2015 | Black Mass | William M. Bulger | | |
| 2016 | Zoolander 2 | All | Cameo | |
| 2016 | Doctor Strange | Doctor Stephen Strange / Dormammu (motion capture and voice) | Uncredited as Dormammu | |
| 2017 | The Current War | Thomas Edison | Also executive producer | |
| 2017 | Thor: Ragnarok | Doctor Stephen Strange | | |
| 2018 | Avengers: Infinity War | Doctor Stephen Strange | | |
| 2018 | The Grinch | The Grinch | Voice | |
| 2018 | The Dog Days of Winter | The Grinch | Voice; short film | |
| 2018 | Mowgli: Legend of the Jungle | Shere Khan | Motion capture and voice | |
| 2019 | Avengers: Endgame | Doctor Stephen Strange | | |
| 2019 | Between Two Ferns: The Movie | Himself | | |
| 2019 | 1917 | Colonel Mackenzie | | |
| 2020 | The Courier | Greville Wynne | Also executive producer | |
| 2021 | The Mauritanian | Stuart Couch | Also producer | |
| 2021 | The Power of the Dog | Phil Burbank | | |
| 2021 | The Electrical Life of Louis Wain | Louis Wain | Also executive producer | |
| 2021 | Spider-Man: No Way Home | Doctor Stephen Strange | | |
| 2022 | Doctor Strange in the Multiverse of Madness | Doctor Stephen Strange | | |
| 2023 | The Wonderful Story of Henry Sugar | Henry Sugar / Max Engelman | Short film | |
| 2023 | The End We Start From | AB | Also executive producer | |
| 2023 | Poison | Harry Pope | Short film | |
| 2023 | The Book of Clarence | Benjamin | | |
| 2024 | We Live in Time | None | Also executive producer | |
| 2025 | The Thing with Feathers | Dad | | |
| 2025 | The Phoenician Scheme | Uncle Nubar | | |
| 2025 | The Roses | Theo Rose | Also executive producer | |
| 2026 | Confessions II | Himself | Short film | |
| 2026 | How to Live on Earth | Himself | Documentary | |
| 2026 | Avengers: Doomsday | Doctor Stephen Strange | Post-production | |
| 2027 | Wife & Dog | TBA | Post-production | |
| 2027 | Blood on Snow | The Fisherman | Post-production | |

== Television ==
| Year | Title | Role | Notes | Ref. |
|---|---|---|---|---|
| 1998, 2000, 2004 | Heartbeat | Party Guest, Charles, Toby Fisher | 3 episodes | |
| 2002 | Tipping the Velvet | Freddy | Episode #1.1 | |
| 2002 | Silent Witness | Warren Reid | 1 episode, two parts, season 6 (6.5 & 6.6) | |
| 2003 | Cambridge Spies | Edward Hand | Episode #1.2 | |
| 2003 | Spooks | Jim North | Episode #2.1 | |
| 2003 | Fortysomething | Rory Slippery | 6 episodes | |
| 2004 | Dunkirk | Lt. Jimmy Langley | Docudrama | |
| 2004 | Hawking | Stephen Hawking | Television film | |
| 2005 | Nathan Barley | Robin | 2 episodes | |
| 2005 | To the Ends of the Earth | Edmund Talbot | 3 episodes | |
| 2005 | Broken News | Will Parker | 3 episodes | |
| 2007 | Stuart: A Life Backwards | Alexander Masters | Television film | |
| 2008 | The Last Enemy | Stephen Ezard | 5 episodes | |
| 2009 | Small Island | Bernard | Television film | |
| 2009 | Marple: Murder Is Easy | Luke Fitzwilliam | Television film | |
| 2010 | Van Gogh: Painted with Words | Vincent van Gogh | Television film | |
| 2010 | The Rattigan Enigma | Presenter | Documentary | |
| 2010–2017 | Sherlock | Sherlock Holmes | 13 episodes | |
| 2012 | Parade's End | Christopher Tietjens | 5 episodes | |
| 2013, 2021 | The Simpsons | British Prime Minister / Severus Snape; Quilloughby, Imaginary Quilloughby (voices) | 2 episodes | |
| 2014 | The Colbert Report | Smaug (voice) | Episode #1,443 | |
| 2016 | The Hollow Crown | Richard III | 2 episodes | |
| 2016 | Saturday Night Live | Himself (host) | Episode: "Benedict Cumberbatch / Solange" | |
| 2017 | The Child in Time | Stephen Lewis | Television film | |
| 2018 | Patrick Melrose | Patrick Melrose | 5 episodes; also executive producer | |
| 2019 | Brexit: The Uncivil War | Dominic Cummings | Television film | |
| 2019 | Good Omens | Satan (voice) | 3 episodes | |
| 2019 | The Tiger Who Came to Tea | Daddy (voice) | Television film | |
| 2021, 2023 | What If...? | Doctor Stephen Strange, Doctor Strange Supreme (voice) | 6 episodes | |
| 2022 | Saturday Night Live | Himself (host) | Episode: "Benedict Cumberbatch / Arcade Fire" | |
| 2022 | Marvel Studios: Assembled | Himself | Episode: "The Making of Doctor Strange in the Multiverse of Madness " | |
| 2023 | Running Wild With Bear Grylls: The Challenge | Himself (guest) | Series 2, episode 2 | |
| 2023 | Mog’s Christmas | Mr. Thomas (voice) | Animated Christmas special | |
| 2024 | Eric | Vincent Anderson / Eric (voice) | lead role; miniseries; also executive producer | |
| 2026 | David Attenborough's 100 Years on Planet Earth | Himself | Guest | |
| 2026 | Cunk on Cinema | Himself | Miniseries | |

== Theatre ==
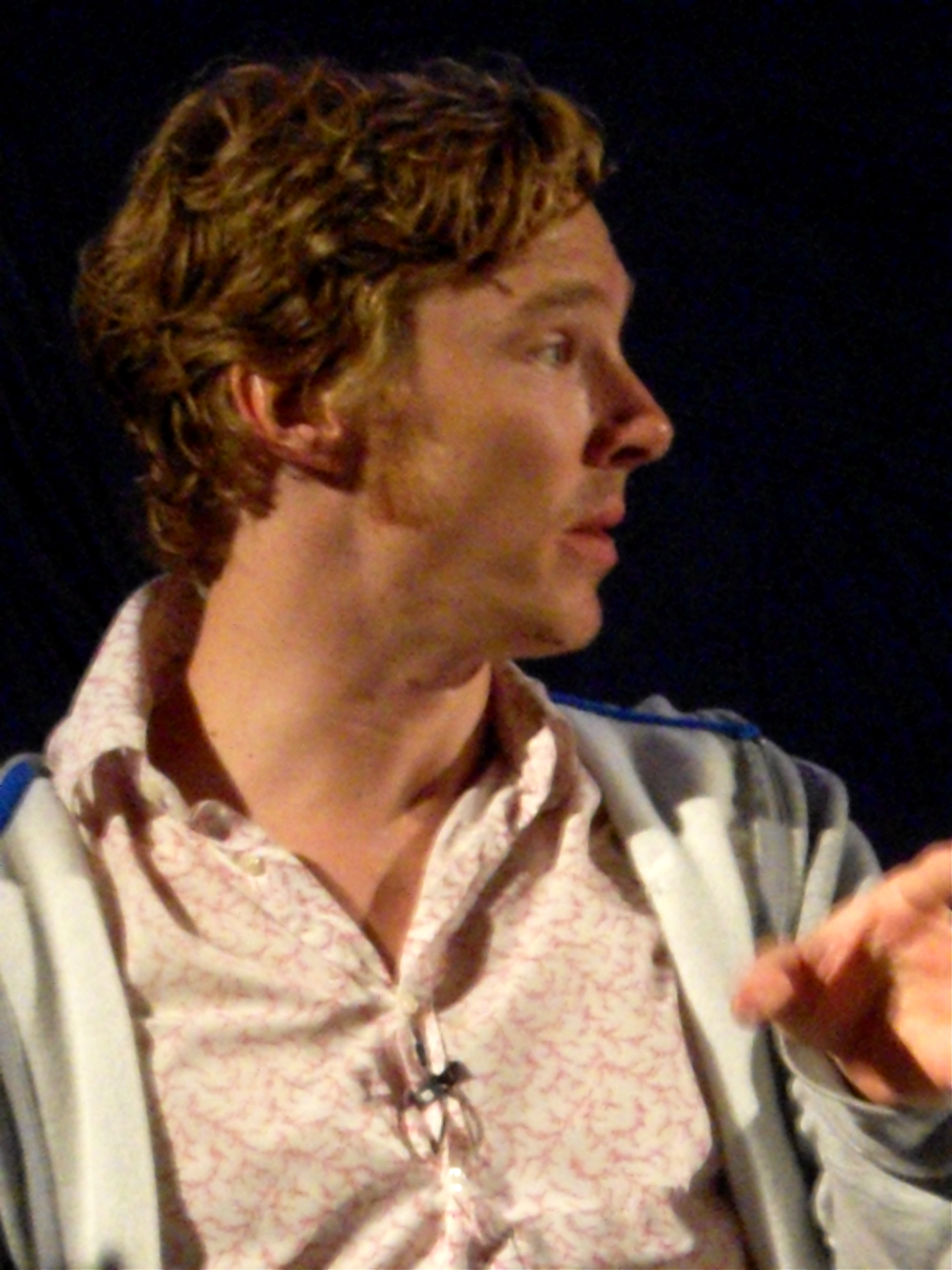
During rehearsals for Frankenstein, April 2011

| Year | Title | Role | Location | Ref. |
|---|---|---|---|---|
| 1998 | Rat in the Skull | Roche | Edinburgh Festival Fringe | |
| 1999 | The Zoo Story | Jerry | Edinburgh Festival Fringe | |
| 1999, 2002 | The Kvetch | George | Teatro Della Contraddizione | |
| 2000 | Woyzeck | Unknown | Didsbury Studio | |
| 2001 | The Visit | Anton Schill | Edinburgh Festival Fringe; Drayton Court Theatre; Tearto Della Contraddizione | |
| 2001 | Love's Labour's Lost | Ferdinand | Open Air Theatre | |
| 2001 | A Midsummer Night's Dream | Demetrius | Open Air Theatre | |
| 2002 | As You Like It | Orlando | Open Air Theatre | |
| 2002 | Romeo and Juliet | Benvolio | Open Air Theatre | |
| 2002 | Oh, What a Lovely War! | Unknown | Open Air Theatre | |
| 2004 | Dead Hand | Unknown | The Old Vic | |
| 2004 | The Lady from the Sea | Lyngstrand | Almeida Theatre | |
| 2005 | Hedda Gabler | George Tesman | Almeida Theatre; Duke of York's Theatre | |
| 2006 | Period of Adjustment | George | Almeida Theatre | |
| 2007 | Rhinoceros | Bérenger | Royal Court Theatre | |
| 2007 | The Arsonists | Eisenring | Royal Court Theatre | |
| 2008 | The City | Chris | Royal Court Theatre | |
| 2010 | After the Dance | David Scott-Fowler | Royal National Theatre | |
| 2010 | The Children's Monologues | Reader | The Old Vic | |
| 2011 | Frankenstein | The Creature / Victor Frankenstein | Royal National Theatre | |
| 2013 | 50 Years on Stage | Himself / Rosencrantz | Royal National Theatre | |
| 2013–present | Letters Live | Reader | The Tabernacle; Hay Festival; Freemasons' Hall; The Town Hall; Union Chapel Royal Albert Hall Royal Festival Hall Glastonbury Festival | |
| 2015 | Hamlet | Prince Hamlet | Barbican Theatre | |

== Radio ==
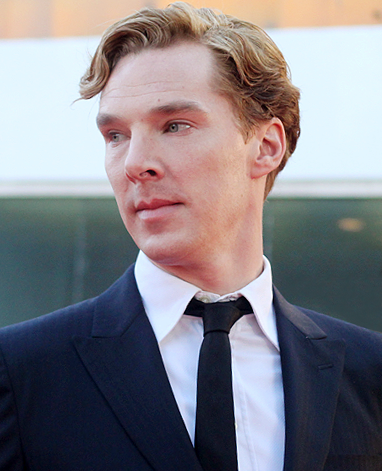
At the London premiere of Tinker Tailor Soldier Spy in September 2011

| Year | Title | Role | Ref. |
|---|---|---|---|
| 2004 | Mansfield Park | Edmund Bertram | |
| 2004 | Kepler | Johannes Kepler | |
| 2004 | The Raj Quartet | Nigel Rowan | |
| 2004 | The Recruiting Officer | Worthy | |
| 2004 | The Odyssey | Telemachus | |
| 2004 | The Biggest Secret | Captain Rob Collins | |
| 2004 | The Far Side of the World | Narrator | |
| 2004 | The Surgeon's Mate | Narrator | |
| 2004 | Mr. Norris Changes Trains | Narrator | |
| 2005 | Le Pere Goriot | Narrator | |
| 2005 | Seven Women | Tovey | |
| 2005 | Medical Humanities: Baptism by Rotation | Narrator | |
| 2005 | Fieldstudy: The Field | Narrator | |
| 2005 | The Cocktail Party | Peter Quilpe | |
| 2006 | The Possessed | Nikolai Stavrogin | |
| 2008 | The Pillow Book | Tadanobu | |
| 2008 | Blake's 7: The Early Years | Townsend | |
| 2008 | Last Days of Grace | GF | |
| 2008 | At War with Wellington | Duke of Wellington | |
| 2008 | Chatterton: The Allington Solution | Thomas Chatterton | |
| 2008 | Spellbound | Dr. Murchison | |
| 2008 | Rainy Season | Narrator | |
| 2008 | The Tiger's Tale | Narrator | |
| 2008 | Words and Music: Italian Fantasy | Narrator | |
| 2008 | Doctor Who: Forty-Five | Howard Carter / Thing 2 | |
| 2008–2014 | Cabin Pressure | Captain Martin Crieff | |
| 2008 | Metamorphosis | Narrator | |
| 2009 | Good Evening | Dudley Moore | |
| 2009 | Little Red Hen | Narrator | |
| 2009 | Rumpole and the Penge Bungalow Murders | Young Rumpole | |
| 2010 | Rumpole and the Family Pride | Young Rumpole | |
| 2010 | Rumpole and the Eternal Triangle | Young Rumpole | |
| 2010 | Words for You: The Next Chapter | Narrator | |
| 2011 | Tom and Viv | T. S. Eliot | |
| 2012 | Rumpole and the Man of God | Young Rumpole | |
| 2012 | Rumpole and the Explosive Evidence | Young Rumpole | |
| 2012 | Rumpole and the Gentle Art of Blackmail | Young Rumpole | |
| 2012 | Rumpole and the Expert Witness | Young Rumpole | |
| 2013 | Copenhagen | Werner Heisenberg | |
| 2013 | Neverwhere | Angel Islington | |
| 2014 | Rumpole and the Old Boy Net | Rumpole | |
| 2014 | Rumpole and the Sleeping Partners | Rumpole | |
| 2015 | My Dear Bessie | Chris | |

== Narration ==
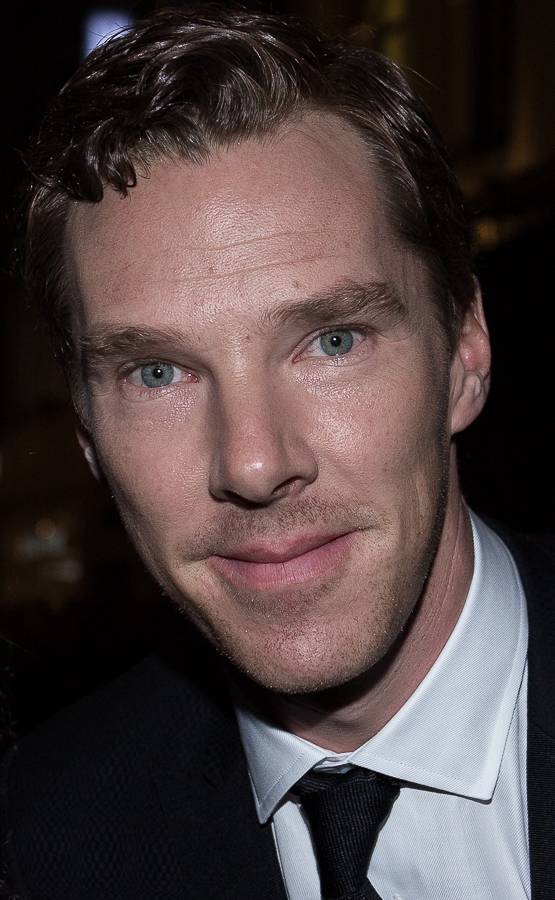
At the 2014 London Evening Standard Theatre Awards

| Year | Title | Notes | Ref. |
|---|---|---|---|
| 2006 | Casanova | Track: "Memoirs of Giacomo Casanova" | |
| 2009 | South Pacific | Documentary; 6 episodes | |
| 2010 | Into the Universe with Stephen Hawking | Documentary; 3 episodes | |
| 2011 | Curiosity | Documentary; episode "Did God Create the Universe?" | |
| 2012 | Stephen Hawking's Grand Design | Documentary; 3 episodes | |
| 2012 | Our War | Documentary narrating Lt. Mark Evison diary; 1 episodes | |
| 2012 | Late Night Tales: Friendly Fires | Track: "Flat of Angles (Part 1)" | |
| 2013 | Late Night Tales: Röyksopp | Track: "Flat of Angles (Part 2)" | |
| 2013 | Late Night Tales: Bonobo | Track: "Flat of Angles (Part 3)" | |
| 2013 | Jerusalem | Documentary | |
| 2013 | Usher House | Opera by Gordon Getty | |
| 2014 | Late Night Tales: Django Django | Track: "Flat of Angles (Part 4)" | |
| 2014 | Globalised Slavery | Documentary by The Guardian | |
| 2014 | Cristiano Ronaldo: The World at His Feet | Documentary | |
| 2017 | Walk with Me – A Journal into Mindfulness featuring Thich Nhat Hanh | Documentary | |
| 2021 | Sleep Sound | Animated short | |
| 2022 | Super/Natural | Documentary: 6 episodes | |

== Video games ==
| Year | Title | Voice role | Ref. |
|---|---|---|---|
| 2011 | The Nightjar | Narrator | |
| 2014 | Sherlock: The Network | Sherlock Holmes | |
| 2014 | Lego The Hobbit | Smaug / The Necromancer | |
| 2015 | Family Guy: The Quest for Stuff | Himself | |
| 2025 | World of Tanks - Holiday Ops 2026 | Himself | |

== See also ==
- List of awards and nominations received by Benedict Cumberbatch
