= List of awards and nominations received by Benedict Cumberbatch =

Benedict Cumberbatch awards and nominations
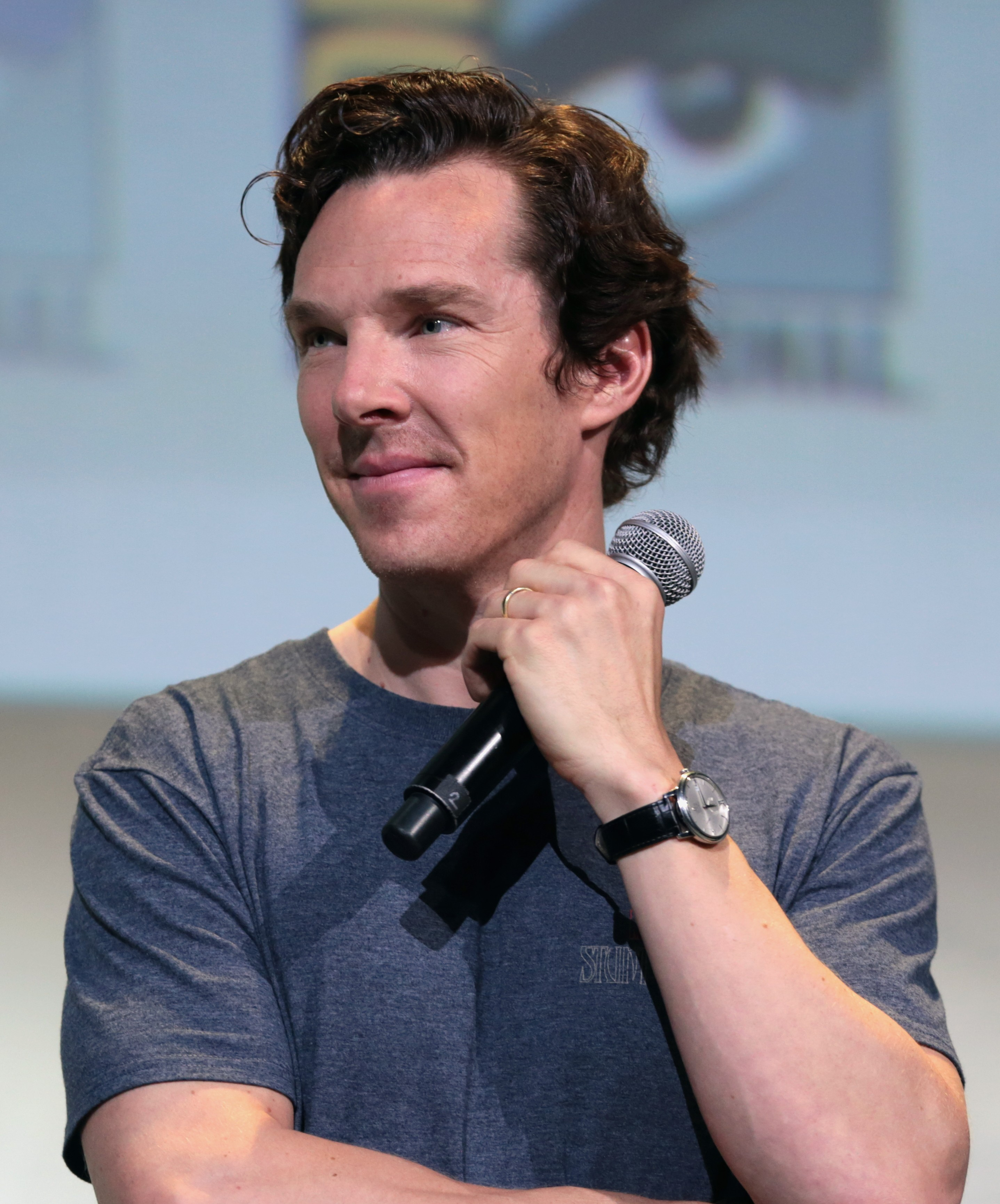
- Cumberbatch at the 2016 San Diego Comic-Con
Awards and nominations
Award	Wins	Nominations
AACTA Awards	1	2
Academy Awards	0	2
British Academy Film Awards	0	2
British Academy Television Awards	1	7
British Academy Britannia Awards	1	1
British Independent Film Awards	1	3
Critics' Choice Movie Awards	0	2
Critics' Choice Super Awards	0	1
Critics' Choice Television Awards	1	4
Golden Globe Awards	0	4
Laurence Olivier Awards	1	3
National Television Awards	1	3
Primetime Emmy Awards	1	7
Screen Actors Guild Awards	0	6

Totals (Note: Certain award groups do not simply award one winner. They acknowledge several different recipients, have runners-up, and have third place. Since this is a specific recognition and is different from losing an award, runner-up mentions are considered wins in this award tally. For simplification and to avoid errors, each award in this list has been presumed to have had a prior nomination.)
- Wins: 32
- Nominations: 109

The following is a list of awards and nominations received by Benedict Cumberbatch.

Benedict Cumberbatch is English actor known for his performances on stage and screen. Over his career he has received several accolades including a British Academy Television Award, a Primetime Emmy Award, a Critics' Choice Television Award, and a Laurence Olivier Award as well as nominations for two British Academy Film Awards, four Golden Globe Awards, and seven Screen Actors Guild Awards.

For his roles on film he received two Academy Award for Best Actor nominations for his portrayals of Alan Turing in the historical drama The Imitation Game (2014) and a sadistic rancher in the western psychological drama The Power of the Dog (2021). In addition, he has received two BAFTA Award nominations, two Golden Globe Award nominations, and five Screen Actors Guild Award nominations among others.

He gained stardom and acclaim for his portrayal of Sherlock Holmes in the BBC series Sherlock from 2010 to 2017. The role earned him six Primetime Emmy Award nominations as well as the Primetime Emmy Award for Outstanding Lead Actor in a Miniseries or a Movie for Sherlock: His Last Vow (2014). He won the British Academy Television Award for Best Actor for playing the title character in the Showtime series Patrick Melrose (2018).

For his roles on the West End stage, he received three Laurence Olivier Award nominations, winning the Laurence Olivier Award for Best Actor for Frankenstein (2012). In 2014, Time magazine included him in its annual Time 100 as one of the "Most Influential People in the World". He was appointed Commander of the Order of the British Empire (CBE) by Queen Elizabeth II in June 2015, for his services to the performing arts and to charity. On 1 July 2018, Cumberbatch was awarded the Outstanding Achievement Award at The South Bank Sky Arts Awards.

== Major awards ==
=== Academy Awards ===
Year	Category	Nominated work	Result	Ref.
2015	Best Actor	The Imitation Game	Nominated	
2022	Best Actor	The Power of the Dog	Nominated	

=== BAFTA Awards ===
Year	Category	Nominated work	Result	Ref.
British Academy Film Awards
2015	Best Actor in a Leading Role	The Imitation Game	Nominated	
2022	Best Actor in a Leading Role	The Power of the Dog	Nominated	
British Academy Television Awards
2004	Best Actor	Hawking	Nominated	
2009	Best Supporting Actor	Small Island	Nominated	
2011	Best Actor	Sherlock	Nominated	
2012	Best Actor	Sherlock	Nominated	
2015	Best Actor	Sherlock	Nominated	
2017	Best Actor	Richard III	Nominated	
2019	Best Actor	Patrick Melrose	Won	
British Academy Britannia Awards
2013	British Artist of the Year		Won	

=== Critics' Choice Awards ===
Year	Category	Nominated work	Result	Ref.
Critics' Choice Movie Awards
2014	Best Acting Ensemble	12 Years a Slave	Nominated	
2014	Best Acting Ensemble	August: Osage County	Nominated	
2015	Best Acting Ensemble	The Imitation Game	Nominated	
2015	Best Actor	The Imitation Game	Nominated	
2016	Best Actor in an Action Movie	Doctor Strange	Nominated	
2022	Best Actor	The Power of the Dog	Nominated	
2022	Best Acting Ensemble	The Power of the Dog	Nominated	
Critics' Choice Television Awards
2012	Best Actor in a Miniseries or Movie	Sherlock	Won	
2013	Best Actor in a Miniseries or Movie	Parade's End	Nominated	
2014	Best Actor in a Miniseries or Movie	Sherlock	Nominated	
Critics' Choice Super Awards
2023	Best Actor in a Superhero Movie	Doctor Strange in the Multiverse of Madness	Nominated	

=== Emmy Awards ===
Year	Category	Nominated work	Result	Ref.
Primetime Emmy Awards
2012	Outstanding Lead Actor in a Miniseries or a Movie	Sherlock: A Scandal in Belgravia	Nominated	
2013	Outstanding Lead Actor in a Miniseries or a Movie	Parade's End	Nominated	
2014	Outstanding Lead Actor in a Miniseries or a Movie	Sherlock: His Last Vow	Won	
2016	Outstanding Lead Actor in a Miniseries or a Movie	Sherlock: The Abominable Bride	Nominated	
2017	Outstanding Lead Actor in a Miniseries or a Movie	Sherlock: The Lying Detective	Nominated	
2018	Outstanding Lead Actor in a Miniseries or a Movie	Patrick Melrose	Nominated	
2018	Outstanding Limited or Anthology Series	Patrick Melrose	Nominated	

=== Golden Globe Awards ===
Year	Category	Nominated work	Result	Ref.
2012	Best Actor – Miniseries or Television Film	Sherlock	Nominated	
2015	Best Actor in a Motion Picture – Drama	The Imitation Game	Nominated	
2018	Best Actor – Miniseries or Television Film	Patrick Melrose	Nominated	
2022	Best Actor in a Motion Picture – Drama	The Power of the Dog	Nominated	

=== Olivier Awards ===
Year	Category	Nominated work	Result	Ref.
2006	Best Performance in a Supporting Role	Hedda Gabler	Nominated	
2012	Best Actor in a Leading Role in a Play	Frankenstein	Won	
2016	Best Actor in a Leading Role in a Play	Hamlet	Nominated	

=== Screen Actors Guild Awards ===
Year	Category	Nominated work	Result	Ref.
2013	Outstanding Cast in a Motion Picture	August: Osage County	Nominated	
2013	Outstanding Cast in a Motion Picture	12 Years a Slave	Nominated	
2014	Outstanding Cast in a Motion Picture	The Imitation Game	Nominated	
2014	Outstanding Male Actor in a Leading Role	The Imitation Game	Nominated	
2014	Outstanding Male Actor in a Miniseries or Movie	Sherlock	Nominated	
2017	Outstanding Male Actor in a Miniseries or Movie	Sherlock	Nominated	
2022	Outstanding Male Actor in a Leading Role	The Power of the Dog	Nominated	

== Industry awards ==
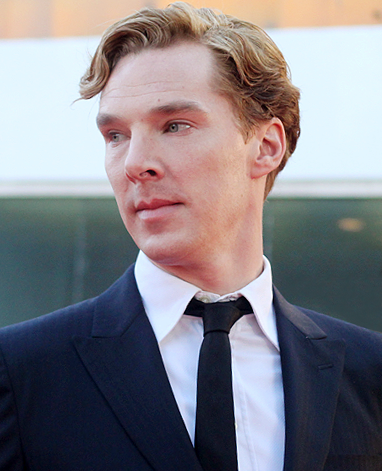
Cumberbatch at the London premiere of Tinker Tailor Soldier Spy in September 2011

Organizations	Year	Category	Work	Result	Ref.
AACTA Awards	2014	Best International Actor	The Imitation Game	Nominated	
AACTA Awards	2021	Best International Actor	The Power of the Dog	Won	
British Independent Film Awards	2011	Best Supporting Actor	Tinker Tailor Soldier Spy	Nominated	
British Independent Film Awards	2014	Best Actor	The Imitation Game	Nominated	
British Independent Film Awards	2014	The Variety Award	The Imitation Game	Won	
Hollywood Film Awards	2013	Best Ensemble	August: Osage County	Won	
Hollywood Film Awards	2014	Best Actor	The Imitation Game	Won	
National Film Awards UK	2015	Best Actor	The Imitation Game	Won	
National Film Awards UK	2022	Outstanding Performance	The Power of the Dog	Nominated	
Nickelodeon Kids' Choice Awards	2019	Favorite Male Voice from an Animated Movie	The Grinch	Nominated	
Satellite Awards	2014	Best Actor – Motion Picture	The Imitation Game	Nominated	
Satellite Awards	2021	Best Actor – Motion Picture	The Power of the Dog	Won	
Saturn Awards	2013	Best Supporting Actor	Star Trek Into Darkness	Nominated	
Saturn Awards	2017	Best Actor in a Film	Doctor Strange	Nominated	
Teen Choice Awards	2014	Choice Animated Movie: Voice	The Hobbit: The Desolation of Smaug	Nominated	
Teen Choice Awards	2017	Choice Movie Actor: Fantasy	Doctor Strange	Nominated	
Toronto International Film Festival	2021	TIFF Tribute Actor Award	The Power of the Dog	Won	
Saraqusta Film Festival	2022	Best Script	The Electrical Life of Louis Wain	Won	

== Television awards ==
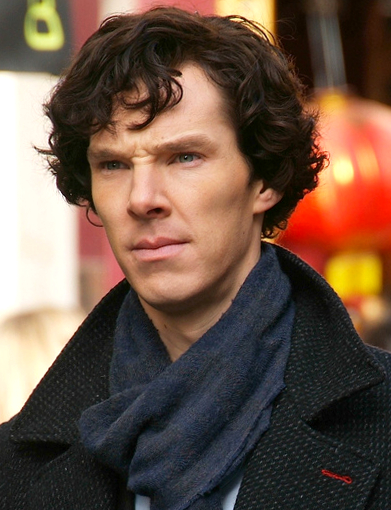
Cumberbatch filming an episode of Sherlock in Chinatown, London in March 2010

Organizations	Year	Category	Work	Result	Ref.
Crime Thriller Awards	2010	Best Actor	Sherlock	Won	
Crime Thriller Awards	2012	Best Actor	Sherlock	Won	
Golden Nymph Awards	2004	Television Films - Best Performance by an Actor	Hawking	Won	
Golden Nymph Awards	2006	Mini-Series - Best Performance by an Actor	To the Ends of the Earth	Won	
Golden Nymph Awards	2014	Television Films - Best Performance by an Actor	Sherlock	Nominated	
National Television Awards	2011	Best Drama Performance	Sherlock	Nominated	
National Television Awards	2013	Best Drama Performance	Sherlock	Nominated	
National Television Awards	2014	Best TV Detective	Sherlock	Won	
Satellite Awards	2008	Best Actor – Miniseries or Television Film	The Last Enemy	Nominated	
Satellite Awards	2010	Best Actor – Miniseries or Television Film	Sherlock	Nominated	
Satellite Awards	2012	Best Actor – Miniseries or Television Film	Sherlock	Won	
Satellite Awards	2013	Best Actor – Miniseries or Television Film	Parade's End	Nominated	
TV Choice Awards	2012	Best Actor	Sherlock	Won	
TV Choice Awards	2014	Best Actor	Sherlock	Won	

== Theatre awards ==
Organizations	Year	Category	Work	Result	Ref.
Critics' Circle Theatre Awards	2012	Best Actor	Frankenstein	Won	
Evening Standard Theatre Awards	2010	Best Actor	After the Dance	Nominated	
Evening Standard Theatre Awards	2011	Best Actor	Frankenstein	Won	
Ian Charleson Awards	2001	Best Classical Stage Performance	Love's Labour's Lost	Nominated	
Ian Charleson Awards	2005	Best Classical Stage Performance	Hedda Gabler	Won	
Whatsonstage.com Awards	2011	Best Actor in a Leading Role in a Play	After the Dance	Nominated	
Whatsonstage.com Awards	2016	Best Actor in a Leading Role in a Play	Hamlet	Won	

== Film critics association awards ==
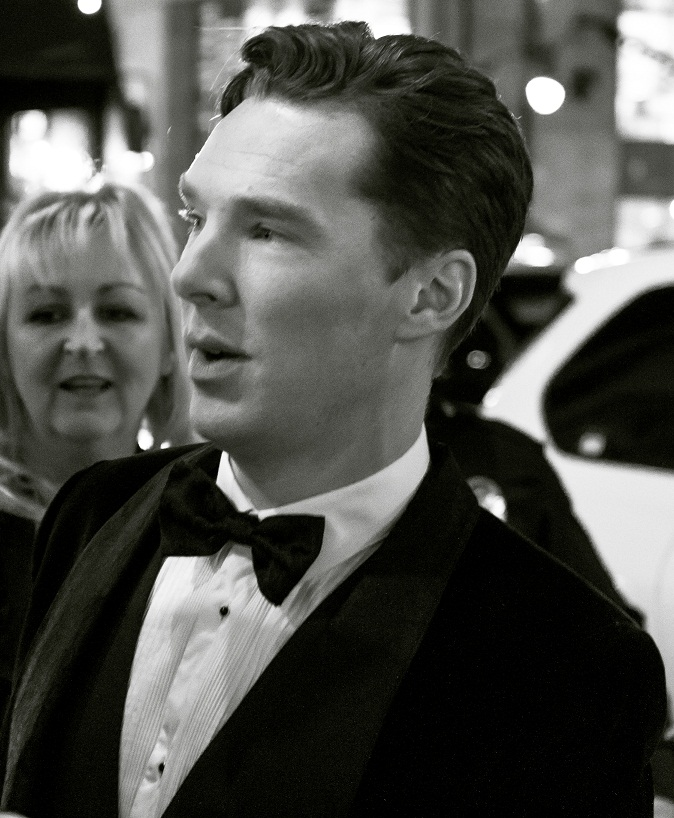
Cumberbatch at the Los Angeles premiere of The Hobbit: The Desolation of Smaug, December 2013.

Organizations	Year	Category	Work	Result	Ref.
Alliance of Women Film Journalists	2022	Best Actor	The Power of the Dog	Won	
Austin Film Critics Association	2022	Best Actor	The Power of the Dog	Nominated	
Chicago Film Critics Association	2014	Best Actor	The Imitation Game	Nominated	
Chicago Film Critics Association	2021	Best Actor	The Power of the Dog	Won	
Dallas–Fort Worth Film Critics Association	2014	Best Actor	The Imitation Game	3rd Place	
Dallas–Fort Worth Film Critics Association	2021	Best Actor	The Power of the Dog	Won	
Detroit Film Critics Society	2013	Best Ensemble	12 Years a Slave	Nominated	
Detroit Film Critics Society	2014	Best Actor	The Imitation Game	Nominated	
Florida Film Critics Circle	2021	Best Actor	The Power of the Dog	Runner-up	
Florida Film Critics Circle	2021	Best Ensemble	The Power of the Dog	Nominated	
Georgia Film Critics Association	2022	Best Actor	The Power of the Dog	Nominated	
Georgia Film Critics Association	2022	Best Ensemble	The Power of the Dog	Nominated	
Hollywood Critics Association	2022	Best Actor	The Power of the Dog	Nominated	
Houston Film Critics Society	2014	Best Actor	The Imitation Game	Nominated	
Houston Film Critics Society	2022	Best Actor	The Power of the Dog	Won	
Houston Film Critics Society	2022	Best Ensemble	The Power of the Dog	Nominated	
London Film Critics Circle	2007	Best British Breakthrough Actor	Amazing Grace	Nominated	
London Film Critics Circle	2014	Actor of the Year	The Imitation Game	Nominated	
London Film Critics Circle	2014	British/Irish Actor of the Year	The Imitation Game	Nominated	
London Film Critics Circle	2022	British/Irish Actor of the Year	The Power of the Dog	Won	
Los Angeles Film Critics Association	2021	Best Actor	The Power of the Dog	Runner-up	
National Society of Film Critics	2022	Best Actor	The Power of the Dog	2nd Place	
New York Film Critics Circle	2021	Best Actor	The Power of the Dog	Won	
New York Film Critics Online	2021	Best Actor	The Power of the Dog	Won	
San Diego Film Critics Society	2013	Best Ensemble	12 Years a Slave	Nominated	
San Diego Film Critics Society	2021	Best Actor	The Power of the Dog	Nominated	
San Francisco Bay Area Film Critics Circle	2022	Best Actor	The Power of the Dog	Won	
St. Louis Film Critics Association	2021	Best Actor	The Power of the Dog	Nominated	
Vancouver Film Critics Circle	2014	Best Actor	The Imitation Game	Nominated	
Washington D.C. Area Film Critics Association	2013	Best Ensemble	12 Years a Slave	Won	
Washington D.C. Area Film Critics Association	2014	Best Actor	The Imitation Game	Nominated	
Washington D.C. Area Film Critics Association	2021	Best Actor	The Power of the Dog	Nominated	

== See also ==
- List of Benedict Cumberbatch performances
