= 2021 New York Film Critics Circle Awards =

87th New York Film Critics Circle Awards

87th NYFCC Awards
- Date: December 3, 2021

Highlights
- Best Picture: Drive My Car

The 87th New York Film Critics Circle Awards, honoring the best in film for 2021, were announced on December 3, 2021.

The ceremony, which was originally scheduled to take place on January 10, 2022, was postponed due to COVID-19-related concerns involving the then-Omicron variant widespread surge throughout the United States; it ultimately took place at Tao Downtown in New York on March 16, 2022.

== Winners ==
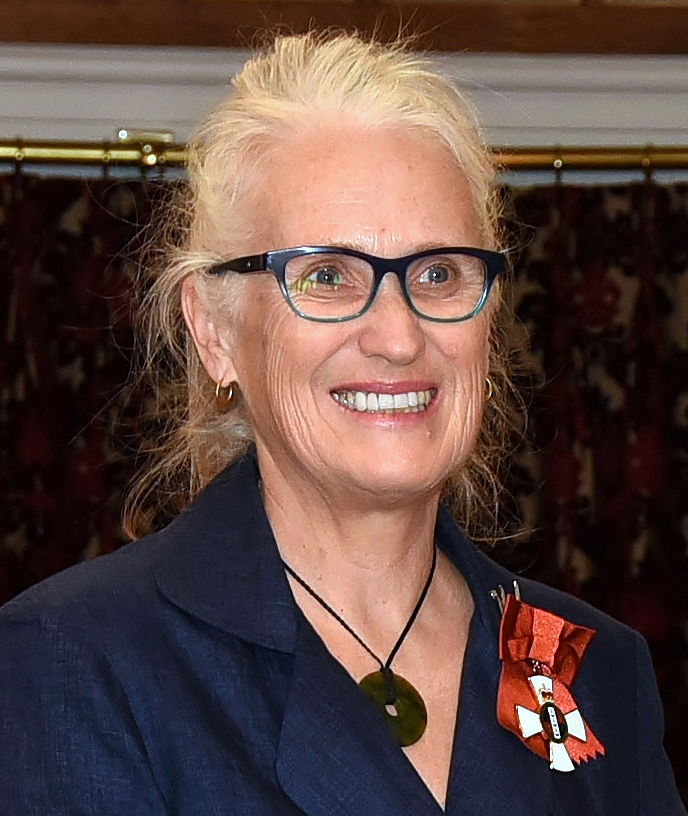
Jane Campion, Best Director winner

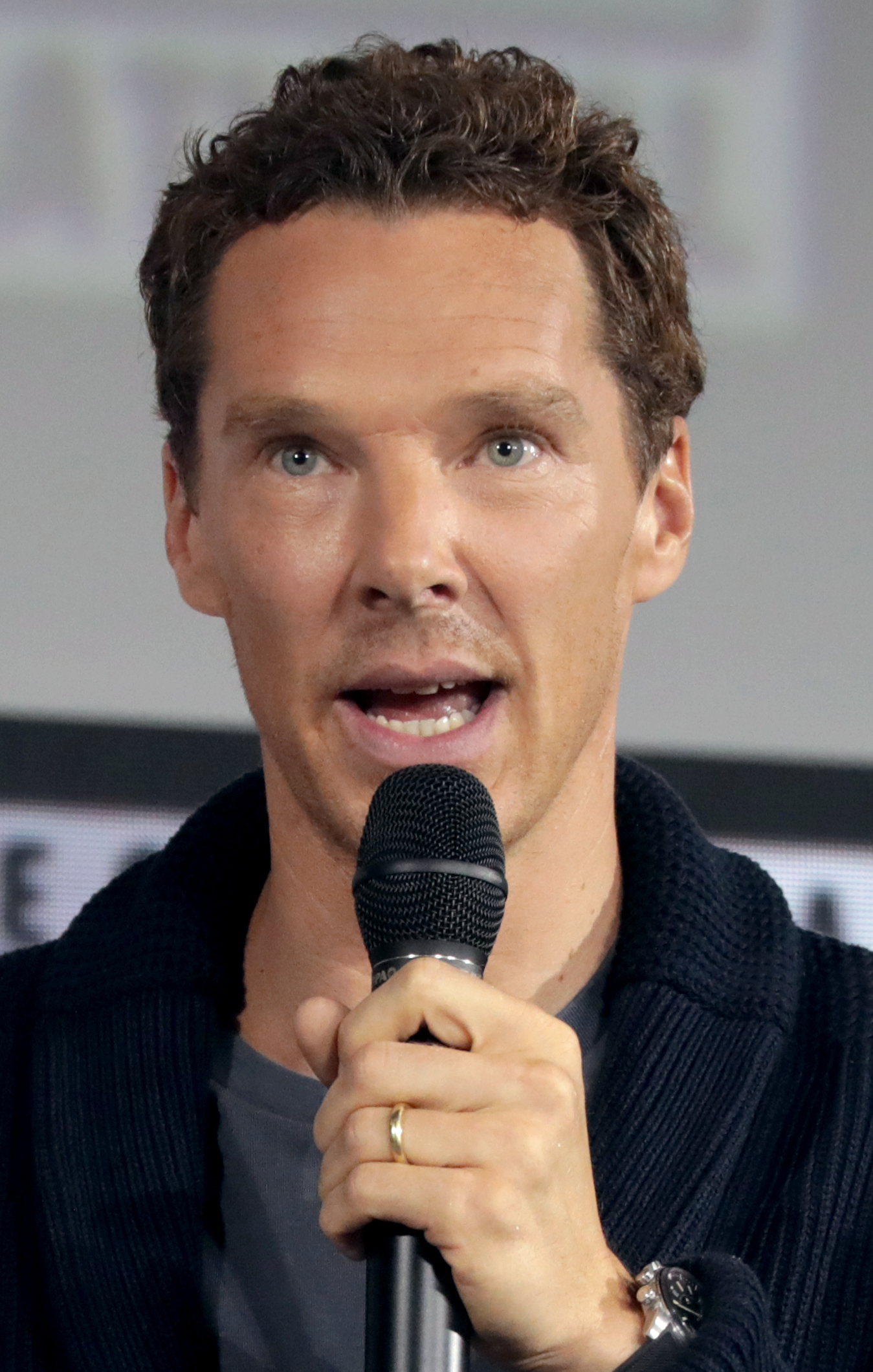
Benedict Cumberbatch, Best Actor winner

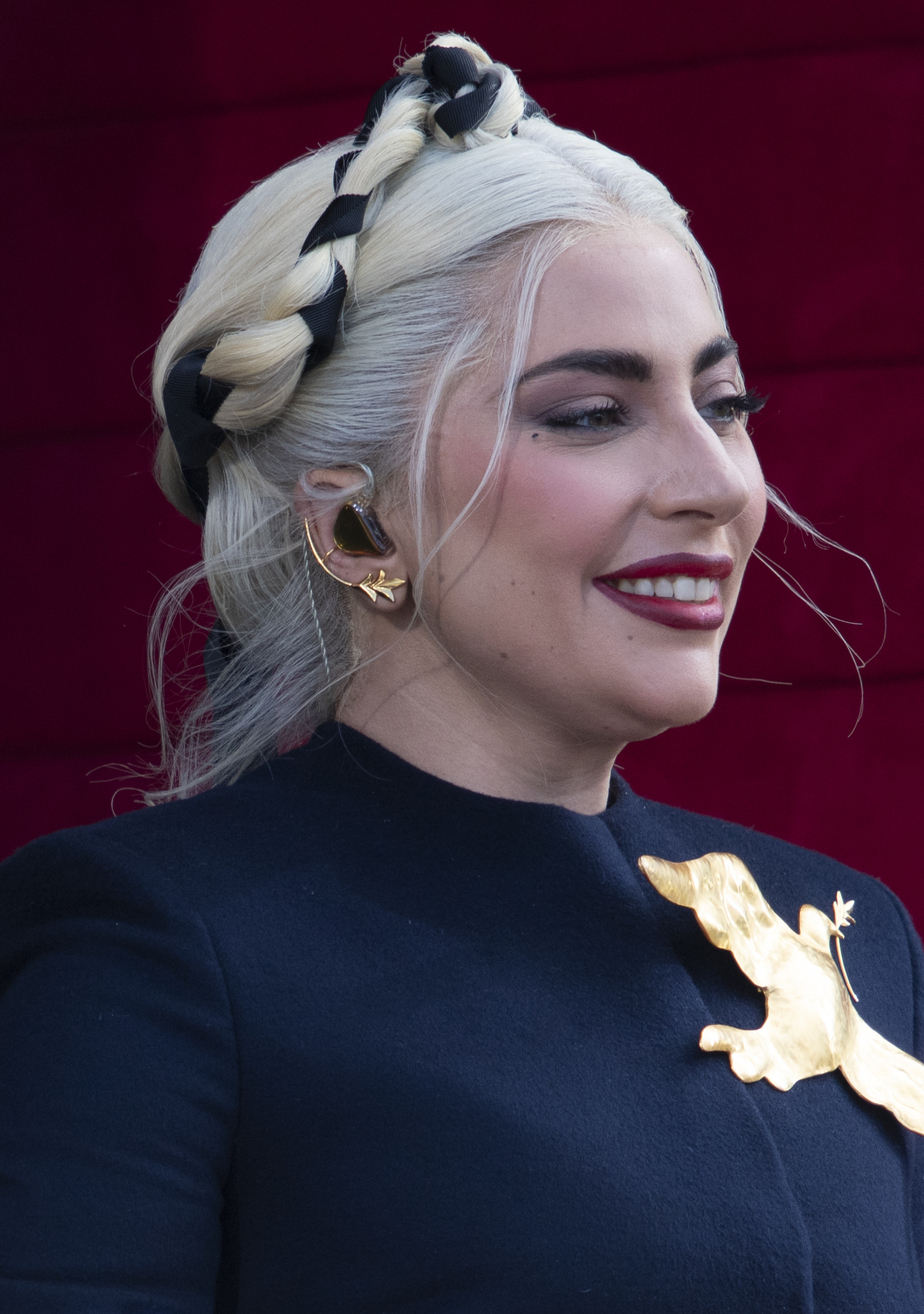
Lady Gaga, Best Actress winner

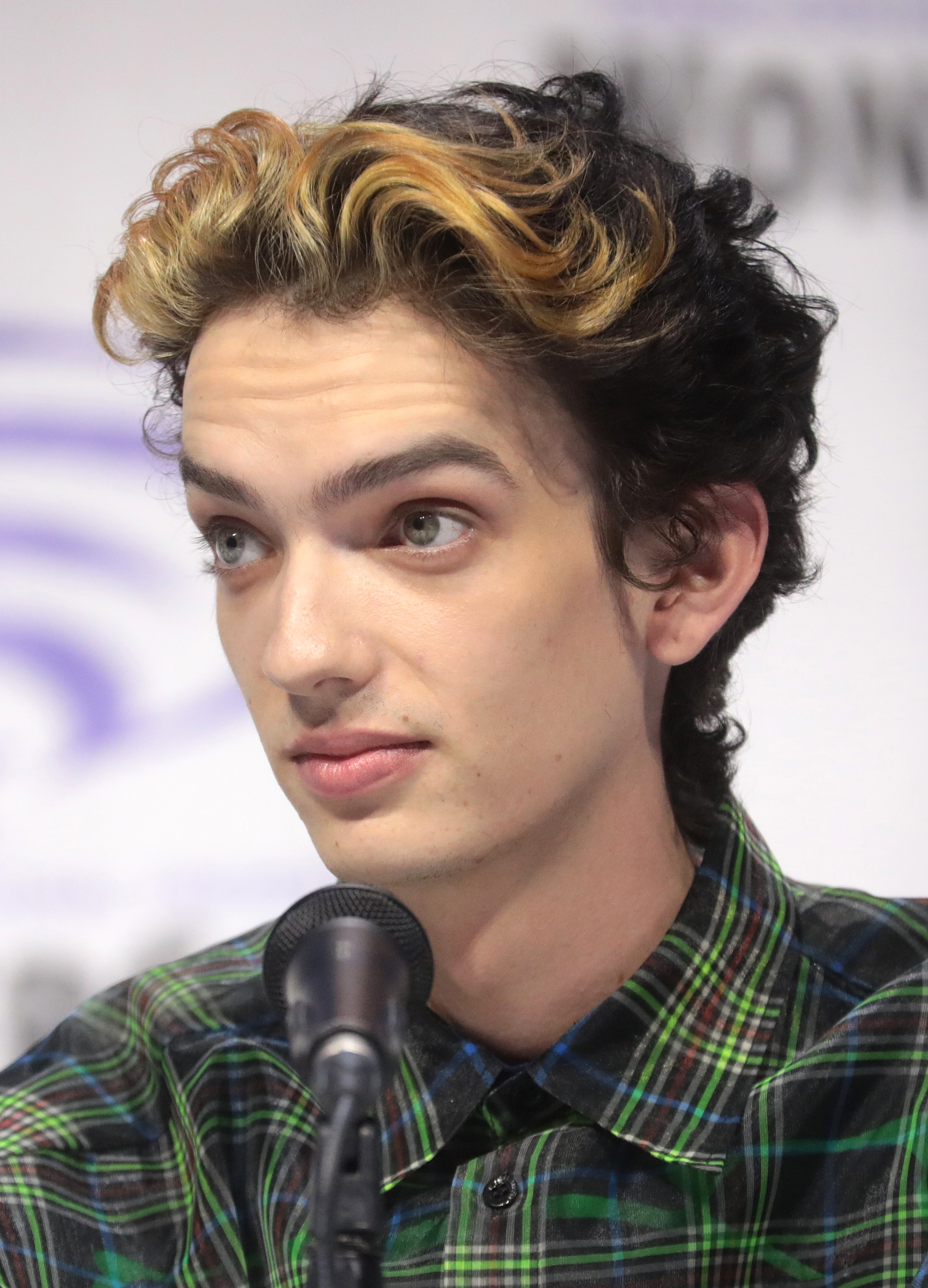
Kodi Smit-McPhee, Best Supporting Actor winner

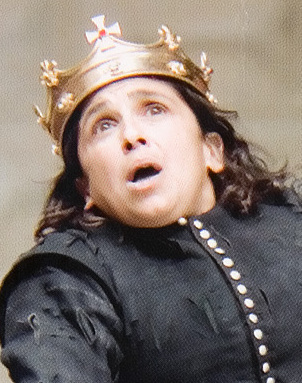
Kathryn Hunter, Best Supporting Actress winner

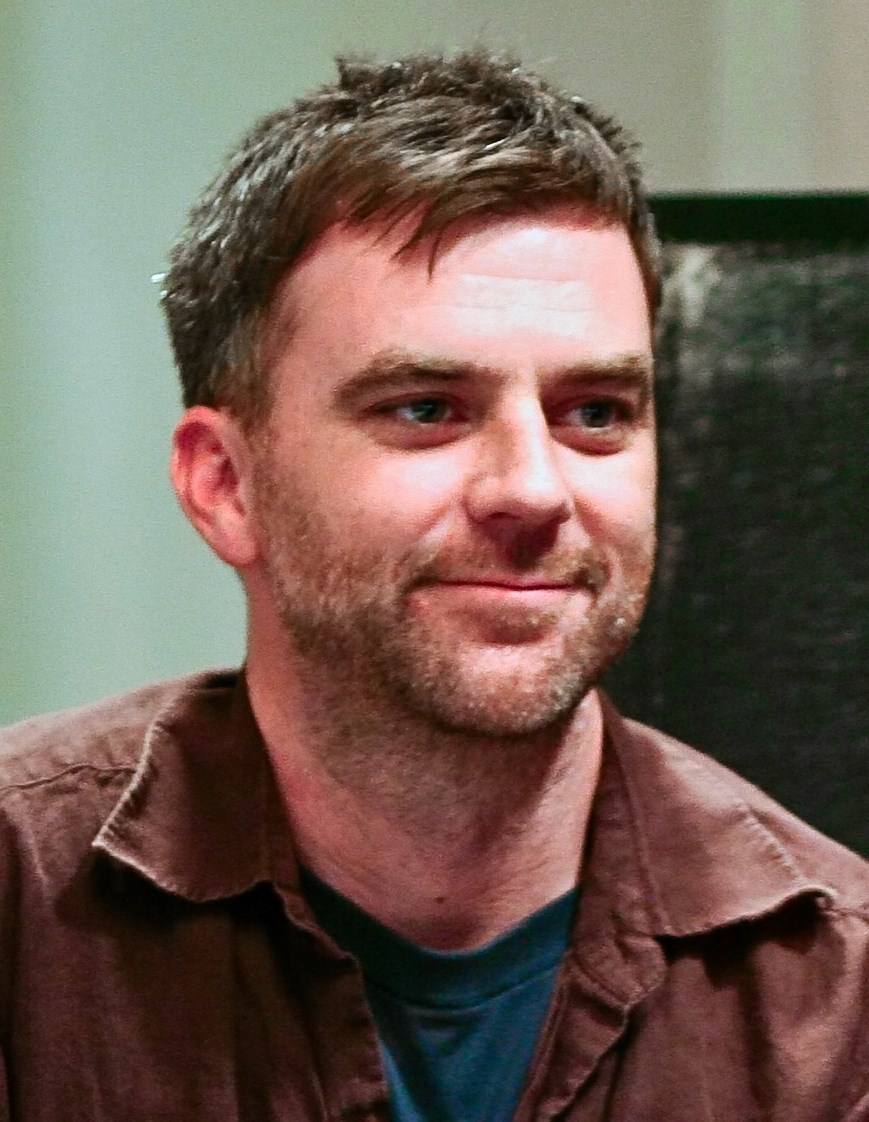
Paul Thomas Anderson, Best Screenplay winner

- Best Film:
  - Drive My Car
- Best Director:
  - Jane Campion – The Power of the Dog
- Best Actor:
  - Benedict Cumberbatch – The Power of the Dog
- Best Actress:
  - Lady Gaga – House of Gucci
- Best Supporting Actor:
  - Kodi Smit-McPhee – The Power of the Dog
- Best Supporting Actress:
  - Kathryn Hunter – The Tragedy of Macbeth
- Best Screenplay:
  - Paul Thomas Anderson – Licorice Pizza
- Best Animated Film:
  - The Mitchells vs. the Machines
- Best Cinematography:
  - Janusz Kamiński – West Side Story
- Best Non-Fiction Film:
  - Flee
- Best Foreign Language Film:
  - The Worst Person in the World • Norway
- Best First Film:
  - The Lost Daughter
- Special Awards:
  - Maya Cade, "for the creation of the Black Film Archive".
  - Marshall Fine, "for his years of service as NYFCC's General Manager and decades on the NY film scene".
  - Diane Weyermann (posthumous), "for supporting daring and impactful filmmaking at Sundance and Participant".
