= The Cool World =

1963 film by Shirley Clarke

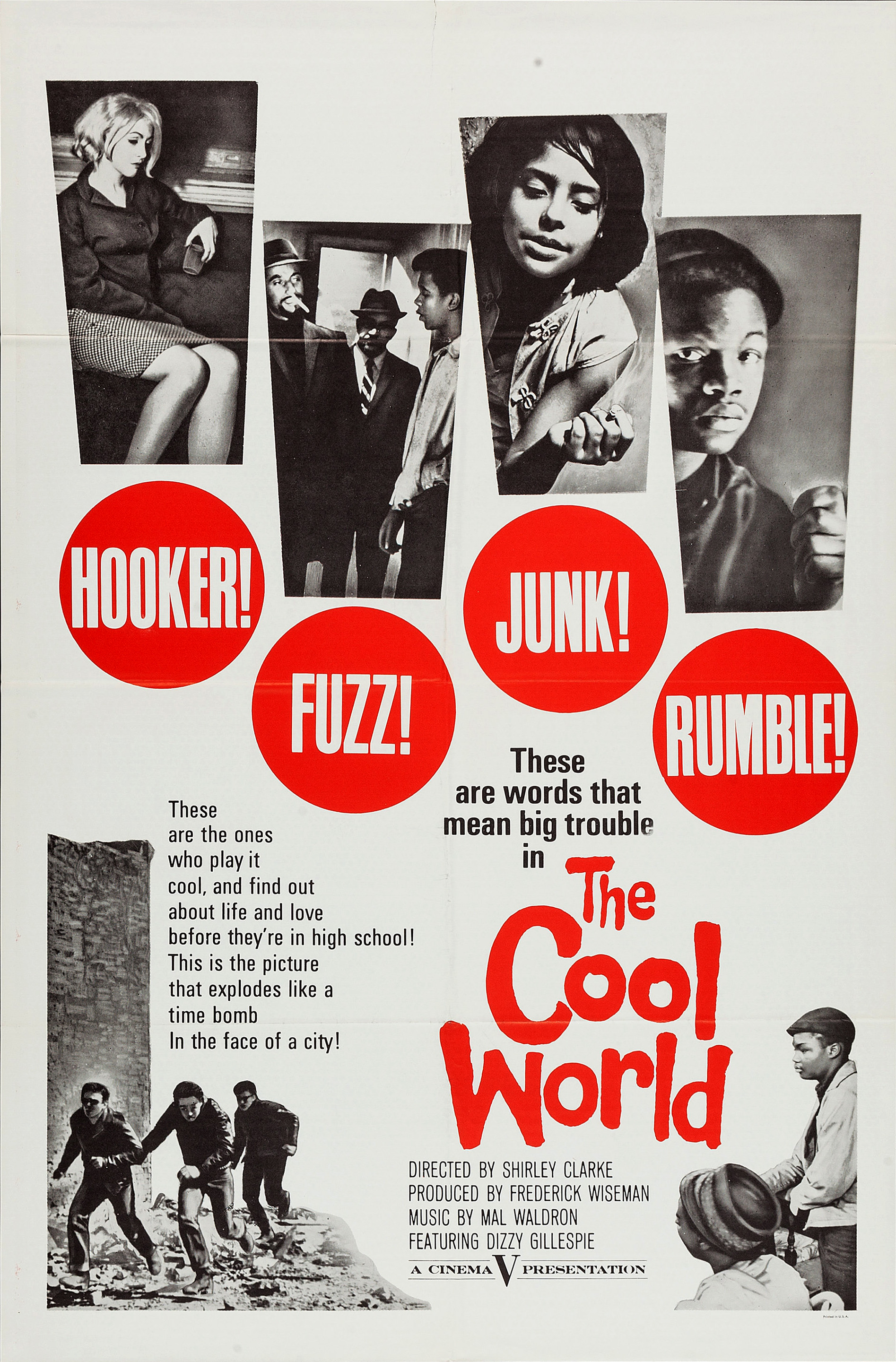
- Theatrical release poster
- Directed by: Shirley Clarke
- Written by: Warren Miller (novel); Robert Rossen (play); Shirley Clarke (screenplay)
- Produced by: Frederick Wiseman
- Starring: Hampton Clanton; Yolanda Rodríguez; Antonio Fargas; Carl Lee; Clarence Williams III
- Music by: Mal Waldron (composer); The Dizzy Gillespie Quintet (performer)
- Production company: Wiseman Film Productions
- Distributed by: Cinema V
- Release date: September 2, 1963
- Running time: 125 minutes
- Country: United States
- Language: English

The Cool World is a 1963 American drama film directed by Shirley Clarke about African-American life in the Royal Pythons, a youth gang in Harlem. In 1994, the film was selected for preservation in the United States National Film Registry by the Library of Congress as being "culturally, historically, or aesthetically significant".

== Background ==
The Cool World is a novel published 1959 written by American author Warren Miller. It was a finalist for the National Book Award in 1960.

== Plot ==
The plot concerns the obsession of Duke (Hampton Clanton), a 15-year-old member of the gang Royal Pythons, to get a gun from a racketeer named Priest (Carl Lee), in order to become the president of the Pythons and a big shot in Harlem. After their friend Littleman's father was forced out of his apartment, the Pythons take over the place and install Luanne, Python president Blood's girlfriend, as resident prostitute. Discovering that Blood is a heroin addict, Duke assumes leadership of the gang and Luanne becomes his girl. During an outing at Coney Island, however, Luanne vanishes, and Duke returns to Harlem alone.

Priest, who is pursued by his enemies, seeks refuge in the Python headquarter and is allowed to stay. In an ensuing battle with the Wolves, a rival gang, Duke stabs an antagonist. Seeking refuge, he returns to Python headquarter and discovers Priest's corpse. Duke then rushes back home and is apprehended by the police.

Utilizing first-time actors and true-life ghettos for scenery, Shirley Clarke's film dramatizes the life of young gang bangers in 1960s Harlem and transcends its narrative to deliver a vivid picture of inner city life.

== Cast ==
The Cool World stars real Harlem youth and some real gang members:

- Rony Clanton as Hampton Clanton, Duke, a 15-year-old
- Carl Lee as Priest, a neighborhood gangster, is killed by the Mob
- Yolanda Rodríguez as LuAnne, a prostitute used by the Royal Pythons
- Clarence Williams III as "Blood", the gang's president
- Gary Bolling as "Littleman", killed by the Wolves, a rival gang
- Bostic Felton as Rodney "Rod"
- Joe Oliver as Angel, leader of the Wolves, killed by the Royal Pythons)
- Gloria Foster as Duke's Mom
- Ted Butler as Mom's Lover
- Marilyn Cox as Priest's Woman, a prostitute
- Antonio Fargas
- The Dizzy Gillespie Quintet

== Production ==
This semi-documentary style movie was produced by soon-to-be documentary filmmaker Frederick Wiseman, directed by Shirley Clarke, and adapted by Clarke and Carl Lee from the 1959 novel The Cool World by Warren Miller, with original music was by Mal Waldron and cinematography by Baird Bryant

A play, written by Miller and Robert Rossen based on the novel, was first shown in Philadelphia and then twice at Broadway's Eugene O'Neill Theatre on February 22 and 23, 1960, featuring Raymond St. Jacques, James Earl Jones, Calvin Lockhart, Hilda Simms, and others. The film helped launch Antonio Fargas, Clarence Williams III, Carl Lee, and Gloria Foster, who married Williams three years later.

== Release and reception ==
The Cool World debuted September 2, 1963 at the Venice Film Festival with a running time of 125 minutes. It received a standing ovation and was nominated for the festival's Golden Lion award. Following its loss to the Italian film Hands over the City (1963), Variety reported that at least one Italian publication, Il Messaggero, decried the judges’ decision.

Early reviews were mixed. While Variety commended Clarke for her achievement and The New York Times gave a largely positive review, the Los Angeles Times expressed disappointment, adding that African Americans were better qualified to make films about their people.

On Rotten Tomatoes, the film holds positive reviews from the site's six designated top critics. Richard Brody of The New Yorker praised the film: "Clarke's images endow the characters' energies with a sculptural grandeur and embrace street life with a keenly attentive, unsentimental avidity." Jonathan Rosenbaum also reviewed it positively: "It certainly had a visceral impact when it first appeared, helped enormously by Baird Bryant's cinematography and Dizzy Gillespie's score."

Currently, there is no home video release of the film. Frederick Wiseman owns the rights, and he is unwilling to release a home video version of The Cool World or to allow Milestone Films to release it among its Shirley Clarke series. Amy Taubin has, in response, called for a boycott of Wiseman's films.

== Soundtrack ==
The soundtrack to the film was recorded by Dizzy Gillespie and his quintet, and was released as an album of the same name in 1964.

== See also ==
- List of American films of 1963
- List of hood films
