= Ornette: Made in America =

- Directed by: Shirley Clarke
- Produced by: Kathelin Hoffman
- Starring: Ornette Coleman
- Cinematography: Edward Lachman
- Edited by: Shirley Clarke
- Music by: Ornette Coleman
- Distributed by: Milestone Films
- Release date: 1985
- Running time: 77 minutes
- Country: United States
- Language: English

Ornette: Made in America is a 1985 American documentary film directed and edited by Shirley Clarke that studies saxophonist and free jazz innovator Ornette Coleman.

== Summary ==
The film does not chronicle the life of Coleman but rather emulates his freeform style by mixing together excerpts from performances, interviews, experimental music videos and reenactments of Coleman's childhood. Included are interviews with and original footage of William S. Burroughs, Buckminster Fuller, Ed Blackwell, Robert Palmer, George Russell, John Rockwell, Don Cherry and Denardo Coleman.

The film intercuts interviews, archive footage and psychedelic sequences around Coleman's performance of Skies of America with the Fort Worth Symphony Orchestra at the city's Convention Center. The opening of the now-defunct Caravan of Dreams nightclub serves as a catalyst for the film's production, but Shirley Clarke had actually been working on the film for a span of over 20 years. The 1968 footage with Ornette, his young son, Denardo, and frequent collaborator Charlie Haden was filmed by Clarke for a separate film that never came to fruition.

== Legacy ==
Ornette was Shirley Clarke's last film and reintroduced her to the independent film and jazz music circuits that she had influenced during the 1960s. Clarke's intrusive, fast cutting editing style and Kit Fitzgerald's avant-garde music video work won the film praise.

In late 2012, Milestone Films rereleased Ornette in select theaters and distributed the restored film on DVD and Blu-ray. This is part of a greater effort on behalf of Milestone to rerelease all of Clarke's old films.
