= Skyscraper (1959 film) =

- Directed by: Shirley Clarke
- Screenplay by: John White
- Produced by: Shirley Clarke; Willard Van Dyke; Irving Jacoby
- Music by: Teo Macero
- Production company: Joseph Burstyn Film Enterprises Inc.
- Release date: 1959
- Running time: 21 minutes
- Country: USA

Skyscraper is a 1959 documentary film by Shirley Clarke about the construction of the 666 Fifth Avenue skyscraper.

== Film ==
The construction of 666 Fifth Avenue skyscraper is shown. The film is mostly black and white. The film was sponsored by Tishman Realty & Construction Co.; Reynolds Metals Co.; Bethlehem Steel Co.; Westinghouse Elevator Co.; York Air Conditioning.

== Production and reception ==
Skyscraper was a short film, and a documentary. It was considered experimental. As well as Clarke and Van Dyke contributing it also involved Wheaton Galentine and D. A. Pennebaker. Clarke said the film was a musical comedy regarding the skyscraper's construction.

It won the Venice Film Festival award. It was also nominated for an Academy Award in the Best Short Live Action category in 1959. It also won many other festival prizes.

== See also ==
- 1959 in architecture
- Sponsored film
