= Stephen Strange (Marvel Cinematic Universe) =

Character in the Marvel Cinematic Universe

- Marvel Cinematic Universe character
- Benedict Cumberbatch as Dr. Stephen Strange in Doctor Strange in the Multiverse of Madness
- First appearance: Doctor Strange (2016)
- Based on: Doctor Strange by: Steve Ditko; Stan Lee
- Adapted by: Jon Spaihts; Scott Derrickson; C. Robert Cargill
- Portrayed by: Benedict Cumberbatch
- Voiced by: Benedict Cumberbatch (What If...?); Robin Atkin Downes (Your Friendly Neighborhood Spider-Man)

In-universe information
- Full name: Stephen Vincent Strange
- Alias: Doctor Strange
- Titles: Doctor; Guardian of the New York Sanctum; Master of the Mystic Arts
- Occupation: Neurosurgeon; Master of the Mystic Arts
- Affiliation: Masters of the Mystic Arts; Parallel versions: Illuminati (Earth-838); Guardians of the Multiverse (What If...?)
- Weapon: Cloak of Levitation; Eye of Agamotto (Time Stone); Sling Ring; Darkhold
- Significant other: Christine Palmer (ex-girlfriend)
- Home: Sanctum Sanctorum, New York City
- Nationality: American

Doctor Stephen Vincent Strange is a superhero portrayed by Benedict Cumberbatch in the Marvel Cinematic Universe (MCU) media franchise—based on the Marvel Comics character of the same name, commonly referred to by his academic title. Initially depicted as an intelligent and arrogant neurosurgeon, Strange experiences a career-ending car accident. In his search to repair his damaged hands, he discovers magic from Kamar-Taj. He becomes a Master of the Mystic Arts, using his newfound powers to protect the Earth from various threats.

Strange allies with the Avengers and Guardians of the Galaxy to combat Thanos, before allowing Thanos to initiate the Blip, himself among its victims, to ensure their ultimate victory five years later upon being restored to life. On his return, Strange remains the appointed Guardian of the New York Sanctum, but finds that Wong has become Sorcerer Supreme, a position Strange himself was in the process of inheriting from the Ancient One prior to being Blipped. Strange later faces several problems from the newly established multiverse, including a rift between realities created by an interrupted attempt to erase everyone's knowledge of Peter Parker's secret identity as Spider-Man which had been caused by Mysterio; and a Darkhold-corrupted Wanda Maximoff, whom he must stop from acquiring America Chavez's ability to traverse the multiverse for her own goals.

The character is one of the central figures of the MCU, having appeared in six films as of 2026. Cumberbatch has received acclaim for his performance as Strange and was nominated for several awards—including Critics' Choice Award nominations in 2016 and 2023. Alternate versions of Strange from the multiverse appear in the animated series What If...? (2021, 2023) and the film Doctor Strange in the Multiverse of Madness (2022). A notable version in What If...? is Doctor Strange Supreme, who accidentally destroys his universe in his efforts to resurrect his version of Christine Palmer, and later co-founds the Guardians of the Multiverse with the Watcher to defeat an alternate version of Ultron. Cumberbatch is set to return as the character in Avengers: Doomsday (2026) and Avengers: Secret Wars (2027).

== Concept and creation ==
The character of Doctor Strange was originally created in the 1960s. Artist Steve Ditko and writer Stan Lee have described the character as having been originally the idea of Ditko, who wrote in 2008, "On my own, I brought in to Lee a five-page, penciled story with a page/panel script of my idea of a new, different kind of character for variety in Marvel Comics. My character wound up being named Dr. Strange because he would appear in Strange Tales." In a 1963 letter to Jerry Bails, Lee wrote:

Well, we have a new character in the works for Strange Tales (just a 5-page filler named Dr. Strange) Steve Ditko is gonna draw him. It has sort of a black magic theme. The first story is nothing great, but perhaps we can make something of him-- 'twas Steve's idea and I figured we'd give it a chance, although again, we had to rush the first one too much. Little sidelight: Originally decided to call him Mr. Strange, but thought the "Mr." bit too similar to Mr. Fantastic – now, however, I remember we had a villain called Dr. Strange just recently in one of our mags, hope it won't be too confusing!

Following a 1978 film adaptation also titled Dr. Strange, various incarnations of a Doctor Strange film adaptation had been in development since the mid-1980s, until Paramount Pictures acquired the film rights in April 2005 on behalf of Marvel Studios. In the mid-2000s, Kevin Feige had realized that Marvel still owned the rights to the core characters of the Avengers, which included Strange. Feige, a self-professed "fanboy", envisioned creating a shared universe just as creators Stan Lee and Jack Kirby had done with their comic books in the early 1960s. In 2004, David Maisel was hired as chief operating officer of Marvel Studios as he had a plan for the studio to self-finance movies. Marvel entered into a non-recourse debt structure with Merrill Lynch, under which Marvel got $525 million to make a maximum of 10 movies based on the company's properties over eight years, collateralized by certain movie rights to a total of 10 characters, including Doctor Strange. Thomas Dean Donnelly and Joshua Oppenheimer were brought on board in June 2010 to write a screenplay. In June 2014, Derrickson was hired to direct and re-write the film with Spaihts. Cumberbatch was chosen for the eponymous role in December 2014, necessitating a schedule change to work around his other commitments. This gave Derrickson time to work on the script himself, for which he brought Cargill on to help. The film began principal photography in November 2015 in Nepal, before moving to the United Kingdom and Hong Kong, and concluding in New York City in April 2016.

=== Characterization ===
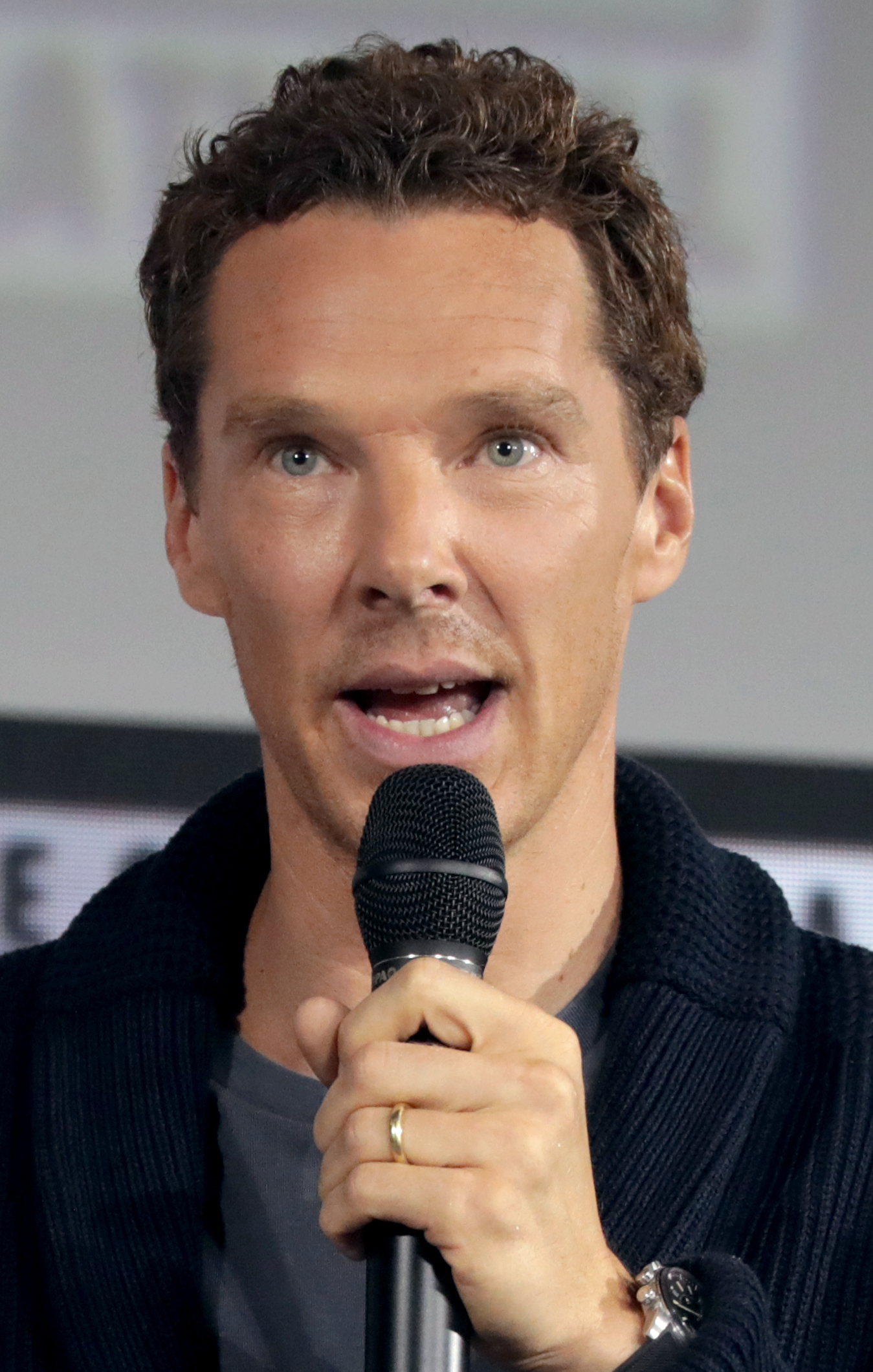
Cumberbatch at the 2019 San Diego Comic-Con

In his first feature-length appearance in the MCU, Dr. Strange is a neurosurgeon who, after a car crash that led to a journey of healing, discovers the hidden world of magic and alternate dimensions. Cumberbatch described Strange as arrogant, with the film "about him going from a place where he thinks he knows it all to realizing he knows nothing." He compared the character to the version of Sherlock Holmes that he portrays in Sherlock, calling both characters "intelligent" and having "smatterings of the same colors". The film's mysticism resonated with Cumberbatch, for whom spirituality has been important since he spent his gap year teaching English at a Tibetan Buddhist monastery in Darjeeling, India. Strange's abilities in the film include casting spells with "tongue-twisty fun names", creating mandalas of light for shields and weapons, and creating portals for quick travel around the world. Strange is also aided by a Cloak of Levitation for flight, and the Eye of Agamotto, a relic containing an Infinity Stone that can manipulate time. Cumberbatch took great care in defining the physical movements and gestures for the spells, knowing that they would be noted and studied by fans. He described these gestures as "balletic" and "very dynamic", and received help with finger-tutting movements from dancer JayFunk.

Later, Strange has become a Master of the Mystic Arts. Markus and McFeely described Strange in Infinity War as "[ending] up being the reasonable adult in the room" with the "widest perspective available". Aaron Lazar served as Cumberbatch's stand-in until the latter completed filming on The Current War (2017). Julian "JayFunk" Daniels once again assisted Cumberbatch with his finger-tutting movements.

In Doctor Strange in the Multiverse of Madness, writer Michael Waldron compared Strange to Indiana Jones as a hero who can "take a punch", but with the intellect of chef Anthony Bourdain, and added that he is a "great adventure hero you just like to watch kick ass". Waldron hoped to explore what effect the events Strange has gone through in his previous MCU appearances would have on him. Cumberbatch also portrays three alternate versions of the character: a seemingly heroic incarnation from Earth-617 based on the version of the character from the 2011 Defenders comic book series; the former Sorcerer Supreme of Earth-838 who founded the Illuminati; and a version who has been corrupted by the Darkhold.

== Appearances ==
=== Film ===
Benedict Cumberbatch portrays Stephen Strange in the films Doctor Strange (2016), Thor: Ragnarok (2017), Avengers: Infinity War (2018), Avengers: Endgame (2019), Spider-Man: No Way Home (2021), and Doctor Strange in the Multiverse of Madness (2022), where he also plays three alternate versions of the character.

=== Animation ===
Cumberbatch voices an alternate version of Strange called Doctor Strange Supreme in six episodes of the Disney+ series What If...? (2021): "What If... Doctor Strange Lost His Heart Instead of His Hands?", "What If... Ultron Won?", "What If... the Watcher Broke His Oath?", "What If... Kahhori Reshaped the World?", "What If... The Avengers Assembled in 1602?", and "What If... Strange Supreme Intervened?", as well as a zombie Strange in "What If... Zombies?!". An alternate version of the character appears in the Disney+ series Your Friendly Neighborhood Spider-Man (2025), voiced by Robin Atkin Downes. Strange, along with Spider-Man and the events of No Way Home, are referenced in the Sony Pictures Animation film Spider-Man: Across the Spider-Verse (2023).

== Fictional character biography ==
=== Early life ===
As a child, Stephen Strange plays on a frozen pond with his sister, Donna, who falls through the ice and drowns, causing Strange to lament his inability to save her. He becomes a doctor, and through years of study and practice, hones his skills to a high level.

=== Becoming a Master of the Mystic Arts ===
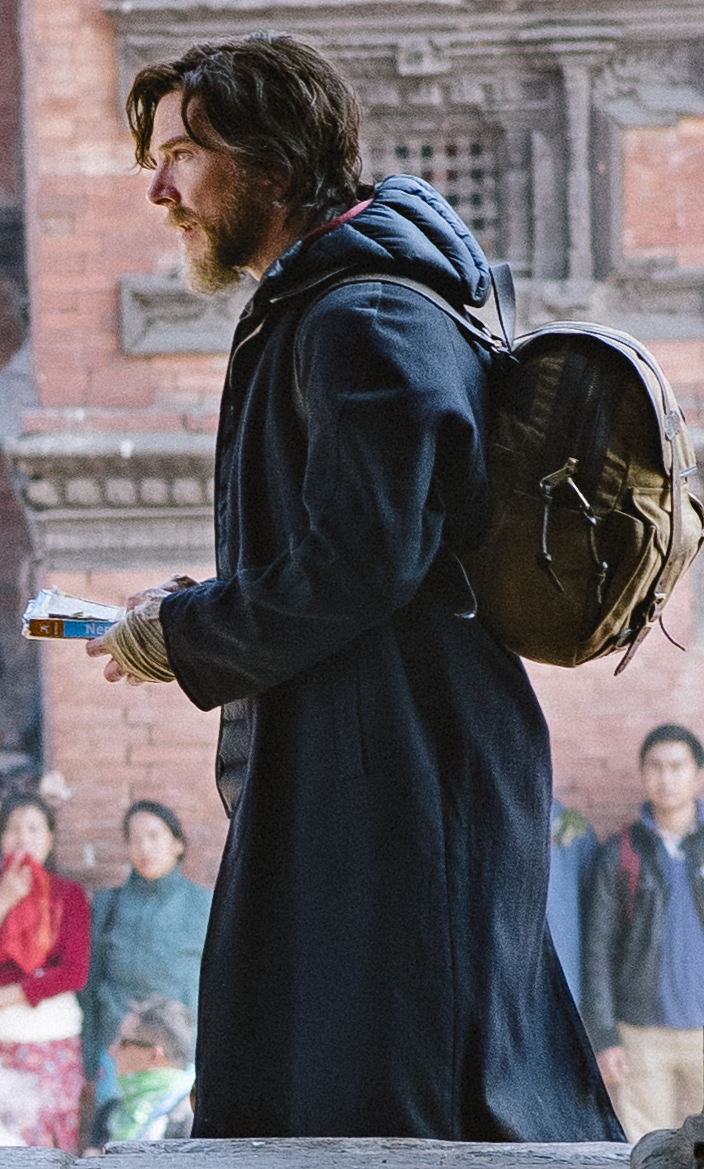
Benedict Cumberbatch on the set of Doctor Strange in 2015.

In 2016, Strange is a wealthy, acclaimed but arrogant neurosurgeon, who severely injures his hands in a car crash while en route to a dinner, leaving him unable to operate. Fellow surgeon and former lover Christine Palmer tries to help him move on, but Strange ignores her attempts and vainly pursues experimental surgeries to heal his hands, at the cost of his wealth. Strange learns about Jonathan Pangborn, a paraplegic, who he had refused to treat earlier due to perceiving him having little chance of recovery but had mysteriously regained use of his legs. Pangborn directs Strange to Kamar-Taj, where he is rescued from a band of thieves attempting to steal an expensive watch of his and taken in by Mordo, a sorcerer under the Ancient One.

The Ancient One demonstrates her power to Strange, revealing the astral plane and other dimensions such as the Mirror Dimension. She reluctantly agrees to train Strange, whose arrogance and ambition remind her of renegade sorcerer Kaecilius, who had recently stolen pages out of a vital book from the Kamar-Taj library. Strange studies under the Ancient One and Mordo, and from ancient books in the library that is now guarded by Master Wong. Strange learns that Earth is protected from threats from other dimensions by a shield generated from three buildings called Sanctums, in New York City, London, and Hong Kong, which are all connected and accessible from Kamar-Taj. Strange uses his impressive memory and progresses quickly, secretly reading the text from which Kaecilius stole pages, learning to bend time with the mystical Eye of Agamotto. Mordo and Wong catch Strange in the act and warn him against breaking the laws of nature, drawing a comparison to Kaecilius' desire for eternal life. After Kaecilius uses the stolen pages to contact Dormammu of the Dark Dimension and leads an attack on the New York Sanctum, killing its guardian, Strange holds off the attackers with the help of the Cloak of Levitation until Mordo and the Ancient One arrive. Mordo becomes disillusioned with the Ancient One after Strange reveals that the Ancient One has been drawing power from the Dark Dimension to sustain her long life. Kaecilius later mortally wounds the Ancient One and escapes to Hong Kong. Before dying, she tells Strange that he too will have to bend the rules to complement Mordo's steadfast nature to defeat Kaecilius, in addition to making him choose between healing like Pangborn or serving protecting the Earth. Strange and Mordo arrive in Hong Kong to find Wong dead, the Sanctum destroyed, and the Dark Dimension engulfing Earth. Strange uses the Eye to reverse time and save Wong, then enters the Dark Dimension and creates a time loop around himself and Dormammu. After repeatedly killing Strange to no avail, Dormammu finally gives in to Strange's demand that he leave Earth and take Kaecilius and his zealots with him in return for Strange breaking the loop. After Mordo turned his back on him after leaving him, Strange returns the Eye to Kamar-Taj, and takes up residence in the New York Sanctum to continue his studies and keeps a watchlist of various threats to Earth.

In 2017, Strange learns that Thor and Loki have arrived and traps Loki in a portal while inviting Thor to the New York Sanctum. There he questions Thor's motives for bringing Loki to Earth. Thor explains they are searching for their father, so Strange locates Odin, releases Loki, and sends the two into a portal to Norway.

=== Infinity War and resurrection ===
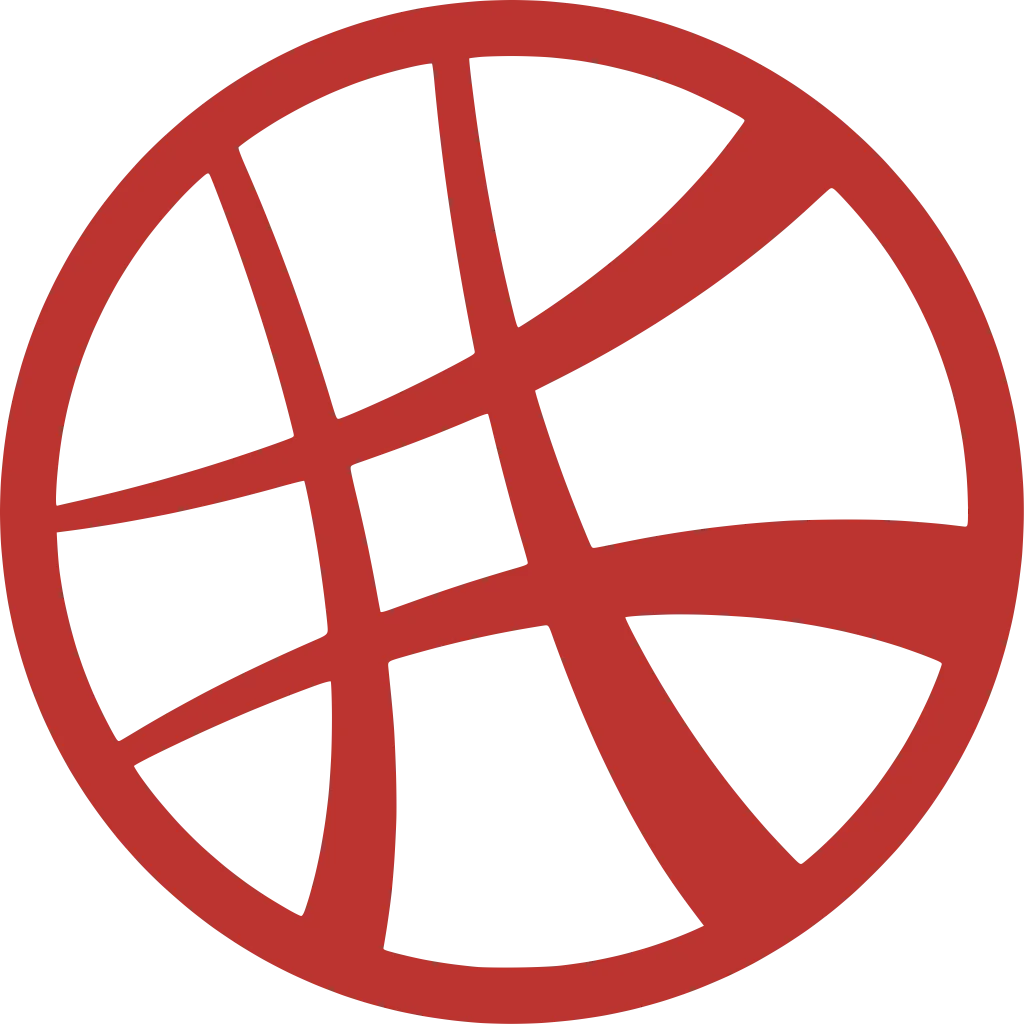
The logo of the New York Sanctum

In 2018, Strange and Wong are talking in the New York Sanctum when Bruce Banner crash-lands through the roof. He informs Strange and Wong of the imminent threat of Thanos. In response, Strange went with Banner to find Tony Stark, who was with Pepper Potts in Central Park, and asked him to accompany him and congratulate him on his proposal. Ebony Maw and Cull Obsidian, members of the Children of Thanos, arrive to retrieve the Time Stone kept by Strange in the Eye of Agamotto, and end up drawing the attention of Peter Parker, who arrives to help. Maw captures Strange, but fails to take the Time Stone due to an enchantment, so he takes him to his spaceship to be tortured until he breaks the spell. However, Stark and Parker infiltrate the ship, kill Maw, and rescue Strange. Landing on the planet Titan, where Maw is supposed to meet with Thanos, the trio meet Peter Quill, Drax the Destroyer, and Mantis and together form a plan to combat Thanos once he arrives. While waiting for him, Strange uses the Time Stone to view millions of possible futures, seeing only one in which Thanos loses. The group, along with Nebula, fight Thanos and are nearly successful in removing his Infinity Gauntlet with the Infinity Stones, until an enraged Quill unintentionally breaks their hold on him. After a brief duel with Thanos, Strange is defeated while Stark is severely wounded, but is spared when Strange surrenders the Time Stone. Once the Blip occurs, Strange tells Stark there was no other way and disintegrates.

In 2023, Strange is restored to life and he along with Wong and the other Masters of the Mystic Arts transport Parker, the restored Avengers, the Guardians of the Galaxy, the Wakandans, the Asgardians, and the Ravagers via portals to the destroyed Avengers Compound to join the final battle against an alternate Thanos and his army. During the battle, Strange keeps the battlefield from being flooded by the lake and hints to Stark that this is the one future in which they win. After Stark sacrifices himself to defeat alternate Thanos, Strange attends his funeral.

=== Helping Peter Parker ===
In 2024, much to Strange's disappointment, Wong has assumed the title of Sorcerer Supreme. That fall, Strange is visited by Parker, after his identity as Spider-Man is exposed to the world by Quentin Beck / Mysterio. Not possessing the Time Stone, Strange offers to help Parker and suggests casting the spell called the Runes of Kof-Kol to make the world forget he is Spider-Man, to which he agrees despite Wong's warnings of the spell's danger. The spell backfires when Parker inadvertently distracts Strange by talking while he is performing it and changing the parameters multiple times, tampering with the multiverse, causing people from other realities who know that Parker is Spider-Man to enter Strange's universe, including two alternate versions of Parker (one from The Amazing Spider-Man film series, and the other from the Sam Raimi film series), as well as their adversaries Otto Octavius, Norman Osborn, Flint Marko, Curt Connors, and Max Dillon, and, unbeknownst to both Strange and Parker, Eddie Brock and his Symbiote companion Venom (from Sony's Spider-Man Universe).

Strange apprehends Connors and tasks Parker and his friends, Ned Leeds and Michelle Jones, to retrieve the other visitors. Once the villains have been captured, an annoyed and weary Strange tries to send them back to their home universes using a relic known as The Macchina de Kadavus, but after learning they will die once they return and intending to cure them before sending them back, Parker steals Strange's spell-containing relic and Strange pursues him into the Mirror Dimension where they briefly duel. Strange becomes trapped in the Mirror Dimension when he is caught off guard and Parker steals his sling ring.

Twelve hours later, he is inadvertently released by Leeds (who had Strange's sling ring with him) and witnesses Parker and his alternate selves (Peter-Two and Peter-Three) curing the villains. Strange's relic is destroyed by Osborn, resulting in the multiverse continuing to break open. Parker tells Strange to cast the spell again, this time having the world forget about the existence of his civilian identity altogether instead. Strange, although initially reluctant and warning Parker of the cost, agrees and casts the spell, resulting in the alternate Parkers, their villains, and Brock and Venom returning to their home universes while everyone from Strange's universe, including himself, forgets Parker, but still remembers Spider-Man, and Beck's victory over Spider-Man has now been finally removed.

Elsewhere, it is revealed that his spell had the unintended effect of displacing a former adversary of Spider-Man, the imprisoned Adrian Toomes, into an alternate universe.

=== Fighting the Scarlet Witch ===
In the Sanctum, Strange dreams of a young girl and an alternate version of himself running from a ribboned creature in an unknown location. The creature ends up killing the alternate version of himself and tries to capture the girl, but she opens up a star-shaped portal that causes her and the deceased Strange to fall through. Soon after, Strange attends Palmer's wedding and speaks with his former colleague, West, in the church, who had also been a victim of the Blip. Afterwards, Strange attends the wedding reception and apologizes to Palmer for his past conduct and congratulates her with her husband named Charlie, who appears to be a fan of Strange. Suddenly, upon hearing a disturbance outside, Strange leaves the reception and confronts an invisible creature that is attacking the city. Strange reveals the creature as an inter-dimensional octopus-like being, Gargantos. When Strange is overpowered, Wong joins the fight and the two eventually kill it while saving a girl, who introduces herself as America Chavez. Chavez explains she can travel through the multiverse and that other creatures are after her power including a Strange from another universe, and Strange told her that they did have experience with the multiverse in a recent event with Spider-Man. Chavez takes Strange and Wong to Strange's body, who had betrayed her, after which Strange declares that he too was in his dream, and Chavez explains that it was not a dream, she and Strange's variant were searching for a book of pure magic called the Book of the Vishanti, which, according to Strange, was not real. After Strange buries his variant, he takes Chavez with Wong to Kamar-Taj, and also discovers that the symbols of Gargantos and his variant weren't of sorcery and were of witchcraft.

Strange meets with Wanda Maximoff in her self-imposed isolation, not realizing that she has already been taken over by the Darkhold and had taken on the identity of the Scarlet Witch. Strange tells Maximoff that he is not there to talk about the Westview incident but about Chavez, however, she accidentally reveals she already knew of her and intends on using her to take her power to be with alternate real versions of her children Billy and Tommy. Strange attempts to reason with her that they are not real but refuses to give her to Maximoff, who attacks Kamar-Taj, killing many sorcerers. During the attack, Chavez's powers are triggered and she and Strange escape in a portal falling through several universes. Strange and Chavez end up in an alternate universe, designated as "Earth-838", where they explore this place, explaining their questions until Strange climbed onto a memory platform, which displayed a memory of him and Palmer on a date. Chavez uses the machine as well and Strange sees the moment she gained her powers, resulting in her mothers being pulled into one of her portals, never to be seen again. Strange comforts Chavez, assuring her that her mothers are still alive. After talking about Strange's complicated relationship with Palmer, he and Chavez arrive at the Sanctum, until they are greeted by this universe's Mordo.

During his visit, Strange and Chavez are then drugged by him and taken into custody. When he wakes, Strange meets this universe's Palmer who designates his Earth as "Earth-616". Mordo takes Strange to the Illuminati, consisting of Mordo himself, Captain Peggy Carter, King Blackagar Boltagon, Captain Maria Rambeau, Dr. Reed Richards, and Professor Charles Xavier. They explain how their Strange's reckless use of their universe's Darkhold to defeat their Thanos triggered an "incursion", destroying another universe, which led the Illuminati to kill him, making Mordo the new Sorcerer Supreme and taking Strange's vacant spot on the Illuminati. The Illuminati then claim that Strange-616 is also dangerous and refuse to believe his warnings about Maximoff. Strange then sees footage of Maximoff, having dream-walked into her 838 counterpart, attacking the Illuminati headquarters, killing all of them except for Mordo, who is defeated by Strange. Strange, Chavez, and Palmer escape to the gap junction, the space between universes, where they find the Book of the Vishanti. Maximoff appears, destroys the book, and takes over Chavez's mind, using her powers to send Strange and Palmer to another universe.

Strange and Palmer enter an incursion-destroyed universe where Strange meets that universe's Strange, who was corrupted by the Darkhold. That universe's Strange tells him that there is a high price for anyone who would use the Darkhold, by showing him his third eye. In a fight, Strange kills this universe's Strange and takes his Darkhold to dreamwalk into Defender Strange's deceased body and go after Maximoff. When Palmer enters, knowing what he is going to do, she declares that all Doctor Stranges in every universe were the same, and Strange agrees, stating that, at that moment, Chavez needs him and cannot do it without his help. Before beginning the ritual, Strange instructs Palmer to protect his body from the Souls of the Damned while he dreamwalks. As the ritual begins, Strange projects his consciousness into the corpse of his zombie-like alternate self, opening the Interdimensional Portal to Mount Wundagore. After being attacked by the demons, who overwhelm him, Palmer dispatches them by destroying them with the Brazier of Bom'Galiath and telling Strange to use them to his advantage thanks to his knowledge of the mystic arts. He grabs them and uses them as a cloak to fly to Darkhold Castle and confront Maximoff. With help from Wong and Chavez, who managed to gain control over her powers, they transport Maximoff back to "Earth-838" to that universe's Maximoff household in Westview, where she is freed from the Darkhold's control by frightening that universe's Billy and Tommy in front of their mother. Realizing what she has done, Maximoff destroys the Darkhold in all universes and kills herself. Strange says that he loves Palmer in all universes, and that it was not about him not wanting anyone to care for her or look after her, but he was simply afraid. They are then saved by Chavez, who opens a portal, and they return to their universes. Strange sees the reconstruction of Kamar-Taj, as Chavez begins training there before returning to the New York Sanctum. Strange takes his time to finally repair his watch that Palmer had given him on their date, and once it is repaired, he puts it away, a gesture of acceptance and improvement on Palmer's part. While strolling through the streets, Strange develops a third eye as a result of dreamwalking and is approached by a sorceress who invites him to avert an incursion in the Dark Dimension.

== Alternate versions ==
Several alternate versions of Strange appear in the animated series What If...? and the film Doctor Strange in the Multiverse of Madness, in which Cumberbatch reprises his role. Another alternate version of Strange appears in the animated series Your Friendly Neighborhood Spider-Man, voiced by Robin Atkin Downes.

=== What If...? (2021–2024) ===
==== Doctor Strange Supreme ====
In an alternate 2016, Strange seeks out Kamar-Taj and becomes a Master of the Mystic Arts after Palmer dies in a car crash while he was left uninjured. After being appointed the title of Sorcerer Supreme, the newly dubbed Doctor Strange Supreme had then proceeded to make countless attempts to reverse Palmer's death using the Eye of Agamotto, but fails no matter what he tries and is informed by the Ancient One that the event was an irreversible "absolute point" in time, as her death drove him to become a sorcerer, the resulting paradox would damage the fabric of reality. Strange refuses to listen and flees to the Library of Cagliostro, where he spends centuries absorbing magical beings and becoming a monstrous version of his former self. Learning that the Ancient One used a spell from the Dark Dimension to splinter him into two beings to divide his power, with the other half having come to terms with Palmer's death, Strange Supreme confronts his other half and eventually absorbs him before resurrecting Palmer, who is repulsed by his appearance while their universe unravels. Strange Supreme begs aid from the Watcher, an omniscient observer of the Multiverse, only to be refused as the Watcher condemns him for not heeding the Ancient One's warning and that he vowed not to interfere in the Multiverse's events. As his universe collapses, Strange Supreme helplessly watches as Palmer fades away from existence and he grieves alone in a pocket dimension he creates.

Sometime later, Strange Supreme is visited by the Watcher, who seeks his help in defeating another universe's now-omnipotent Ultron, who seeks to destroy the entire Multiverse. Strange materializes a bar and meets Captain Carter, Star-Lord T'Challa, Thor, Gamora, and Erik "Killmonger" Stevens, who had been chosen by the Watcher as the Guardians of the Multiverse to combat Ultron. While in another universe, Thor prematurely alerts Ultron to their location, prompting Strange to transport a horde of zombies from another universe to distract Ultron as they escaped. In Ultron's home universe, they meet Natasha Romanoff, and the team battle Ultron. After Romanoff and Carter successfully upload Arnim Zola's analog consciousness into Ultron's body, Killmonger betrays them and is trapped by Strange in a pocket dimension with Zola. Strange is then tasked by the Watcher to watch them for eternity, in which he gladly accepts while quoting to the Watcher "What are friends for?"

Sometime later, Strange abandoned his post and opened a portal to another universe finding a Mohawk tribeswoman Kahhori and Sky World people in Queen Isabella of Spain's courtroom, saying that he had been looking for her for a long time. He later arrived in the 1602 universe and recruited Captain Carter, who had helped save that universe from an incursion. He brought Carter with him to his Sanctum Infinitum and revealed he had captured several "universe-killers" such as a Thanos and a young Peter Quill to protect the Multiverse. Strange sent Carter to another universe to retrieve Kahhori, and afterwards, it was revealed that Strange's ambitions to resurrect his universe's Christine Palmer had returned, and he had been kidnapping both universe killers and righteous heroes from across the multiverse to feed to the Forge, a magical construct which he intended to use to restore his destroyed universe by feeding all of his captives to it. Unwilling to accept the sacrifice of so many potential innocents, Carter released Strange's prisoners and battled him with the help of Kahhori and the Infinity Armor taken from a freed Killmonger, but proved no match for him even with the power of the Infinity Stones. Kahhori eventually succeeded in returning everyone home, but not before Hela, Hulk, another Thor, and Xu Wenwu gave their weapons and symbols of power to the two women. Strange transformed into a demonic beast, but Carter managed to bring him back to his senses for a moment with the Infinity Stones, and Strange revealed that he could not stop it, too consumed by his grief. Transforming back into the beast, Strange pulled Carter into the Forge, but she was able to break free. Before the beast could blast Carter, Strange partially emerged from it and restrained the beast, saving his old friend's life, before falling into the Forge. Strange's sacrifice restored his universe and Christine Palmer, but as a consequence, he would never be reborn into it, effectively never existing in the restored universe.

The Watcher was later put on trial by the Watchers known as the Eminence, the Incarnate, and the Executioner for his repeated interventions, including giving Strange the knowledge that allowed him to recreate his universe. Under attack by the Eminence, the Incarnate, and the Executioner, Carter sacrificed herself to transport the Watcher, Kahhori, Byrdie the Duck, and Storm to Strange's new universe where Strange's soul was in every atom, acting as a living universe. Strange remained perceptive enough to help his friends out again, using his absolute power over the universe to render the three Watchers powerless. An image of Strange briefly appeared amongst the stars, watching over everyone.

==== Zombie Strange ====
In an alternate 2018, Strange becomes infected with a quantum virus and is transformed into a zombie. After attacking Banner outside of the New York Sanctum, he is killed by Hope van Dyne.

=== Multiverse of Madness ===
==== Earth-617's Defender Strange ====
On Earth-617, Strange ends up traveling into the Gap Junction—the space between universes—while protecting America Chavez from an interdimensional demon who is attempting to steal her ability to enter the multiverse. Unable to escape, and believing himself better equipped to control her powers, Strange tries to steal them. He is mortally wounded by the demon, and Chavez sends both of them to Earth-616 (the main reality in the MCU), where he dies of his wounds. Earth-616 Strange and Wong find and hide the body. His body is later possessed by 616-Strange using the "dream-walking" spell from the Darkhold to fight Wanda Maximoff.

==== Earth-838's Supreme Strange ====
In an alternate reality known as Earth-838, Strange is a member of the Illuminati. However, his reckless misuse of the Darkhold in his effort to defeat Thanos creates an "incursion" which destroyed another universe. He was executed by Black Bolt, making Karl Mordo the new Sorcerer Supreme of Earth-838. Upon Strange's demise, the Illuminati lied to the world by telling them that he sacrificed himself to kill Thanos, and a statue was erected in his honor at the New York Sanctum, bestowing him the title of "Earth's Mightiest Hero".

==== Darkhold-corrupted Sinister Strange ====
In an alternate reality, Strange grew depressed and used the Darkhold to dreamwalk and find other versions of himself who might be happily living with their Christine Palmer. When he could not find such a version, he set out to kill other versions of himself out of spite, nearly decimating his own universe in the process. When 616-Strange and 838-Palmer enter this universe, 616-Strange fights and ultimately kills the corrupted and insane Strange by throwing him out of a window, impaling him on a fence post.

=== Deadpool & Wolverine ===
An alternate, unseen version of Strange found himself in the Void, a wasteland-like realm to which everything "pruned" by the Time Variance Authority was sent, and was killed by Cassandra Nova, Charles Xavier's twin sister and self-styled ruler of the Void, who wore his severed skin for four days and kept his sling ring with two Infinity Stones as a memento, which she later uses to help Wade Wilson and Logan escape from Alioth.

=== Your Friendly Neighborhood Spider-Man ===
In an alternate reality, Strange is seen battling a symbiotic alien in public. Their conflict causes destruction to Midtown High School, where freshman Peter Parker is attending on his first day. Peter later assists Strange with capturing the alien. As Strange leaves through his portal with the alien, a radioactive spider emerges through the portal and is left behind; the spider later bites Peter, giving him spider-like abilities.

== Reception ==
The Hollywood Reporter's Todd McCarthy called Doctor Strange "smartly cast", while Alonso Duralde, reviewing for TheWrap said that the film was "smart enough to bring in great British actors to make the predictable paces and life lessons feel fresh and fascinating". Mara Reinstein of US Weekly criticized the film but praised Cumberbatch's "alluring powers" in the role, while Adam Graham of The Detroit News said, "Cumberbatch is wildly charismatic in the lead role... But that's the thing: He's a better party guest than he is a host. Doctor Strange is a fine introduction, but by the end, you're not sad to be headed for the door".

=== Accolades ===
Year	Award	Category	Work	Result	Ref.
2016	Evening Standard British Film Awards	Best Actor	Doctor Strange	Nominated	
2016	Critics' Choice Awards	Best Actor in an Action Movie	Doctor Strange	Nominated	
2017	Empire Awards	Best Sci-Fi/Fantasy	Doctor Strange	Nominated	
2017	Saturn Awards	Saturn Award for Best Actor	Doctor Strange	Nominated	
2017	Teen Choice Awards	Choice Movie Actor in a Fantasy Film	Doctor Strange	Nominated	
2023	Critics' Choice Super Awards	Best Actor in a Superhero Movie	Doctor Strange in the Multiverse of Madness	Nominated	

== In other media ==
Doctor Strange is referenced in the animated film Spider-Man: Across the Spider-Verse (2023) by Miguel O'Hara / Spider-Man 2099, who also alludes to Parker and the events of No Way Home.

== See also ==
- Characters of the Marvel Cinematic Universe
- Multiverse (Marvel Cinematic Universe)
