= Warren Miller (author) =

American novelist

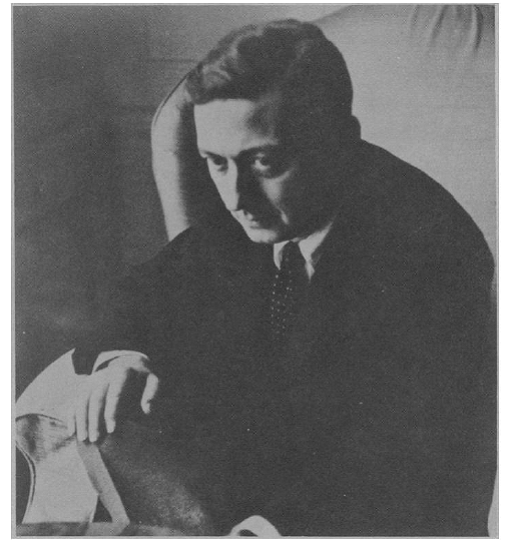
- Warren Miller
- Born: August 31, 1921; Stowe, Pennsylvania
- Died: April 1, 1966 (aged 44); New York City, New York
- Occupation: Writer
- Writing career
- Pen name: Amanda Vail
- Genres: Nonfiction, social commentary
- Notable work: The Cool World

Warren Miller (August 31, 1921 – April 1, 1966) was an American writer. He gained fame for his books dealing with issues of race, as in The Cool World (1959) and The Siege of Harlem (1964), and for his more political books such as Looking for The General (1964) and Flush Times (1962).

== Biography ==
He was born in a village in Pennsylvania where his grandfather kept the general store. He enrolled at the University of Iowa but part way through his studies he joined the US Army. While in uniform he took part in the Normandy invasion.

After the war he returned to complete his education and received his Bachelor's and master's degrees from the University of Iowa, and was an instructor of literature there during the 1950s. He later worked in insurance. By 1956 he was manager of the Push Pin Studios, an advertising art agency in New York.

He wrote several novels during the 1950s and early '60s. His novel Love Me Little was originally published under the pseudonym Amanda Vail.

Miller was married twice; first to a woman named Abby, then to a woman named Jane. His first marriage produced two daughters, Scottie and Eve.

== Bibliography ==
- The Sleep of Reason, London: Secker & Warburg, 1956.
- The Bright Young Things, New York: Little Brown & Company, 1958. ASIN: B0007DVZKE
- "Chaos, Disorder, and the Late Show," in Hills, Penney Chapin, and L. Rust Hills, The Way We Live Now, New York: Little Brown & Company, 1958. ASIN: B000TWRGPQ
- The Cool World, New York: Little Brown & Company, 1959. ISBN 0-316-57336-1 ISBN 978-0316573368
- Love Me Little, New York: Bantam Books, 1959. ASIN: B0007HLGY0
- 90 Miles From Home, New York: Little Brown & Company, 1961. ASIN: B000QJXMCS
- Flush Times, New York: Little Brown & Company, 1962. ASIN: B000KP0XS4
- Looking For The General, New York: McGraw-Hill, 1964. ASIN: B0007DKC94
- The Siege of Harlem, New York: McGraw-Hill, 1964. ASIN: B000EGMPVM

== In other media ==
The book The Cool World was first made into a play and then a movie in 1964 directed by Shirley Clarke, produced by Frederick Wiseman, and with musical score by Dizzy Gillespie.

== Reviews ==
- "Books: Jungle Book," Time Magazine review of The Cool World (June 15, 1959)
- "THEATER: Report from the Road," Time Magazine review of The Cool World play (February 15, 1960)
- "Books: Will THEY Never Come?," Time Magazine review of Looking For The General (January 17, 1964)
- "Books: Topical but Funny," Time Magazine review of The Siege of Harlem (August 14, 1964)
