= Robert Frost: A Lover's Quarrel with the World =

- DVD Cover
- Directed by: Shirley Clarke
- Produced by: Robert Hughes
- Narrated by: Robert Frost
- Edited by: Terrence McCartney Filgate
- Music by: Charles Gross
- Production companies: WGBH-TV; Holt, Rinehart & Winston
- Release date: 1963
- Running time: 41 min.
- Country: United States
- Language: English

Robert Frost: A Lover's Quarrel With the World is a 1963 American documentary film directed by Shirley Clarke and starring Robert Frost.

== Summary ==
The poet's reflection on his life, career and philosophy of the world at his Vermont home and features footage of his lectures at Amherst and Sarah Lawrence College.

== Accolades ==
It won the Academy Award for Best Documentary Feature for 1963.

== Legacy ==
The Academy Film Archive preserved Robert Frost: A Lover's Quarrel with the World in 2006.
