= Shirley Clarke =

American filmmaker (1919–1997)

- Clarke in 1970
- Born: Shirley Brimberg; October 2, 1919; New York City, New York, United States
- Died: September 23, 1997 (aged 77); Boston, Massachusetts, United States
- Education: Stephens College; Johns Hopkins University; Bennington College; University of North Carolina
- Occupation: Filmmaker
- Spouse: Bert Clarke (m. 1943; div. 1963)
- Children: 1
- Relatives: Elaine Dundy (sister)

Shirley Clarke (née Brimberg; October 2, 1919 – September 23, 1997) was an American filmmaker.

== Life ==
Born Shirley Brimberg in New York City, she was the daughter of a Jewish-Polish-immigrant father who made his fortune in manufacturing. Her mother was the daughter of a multimillionaire Jewish manufacturer and inventor. The eldest of three daughters, her sister was the writer Elaine Dundy. Her interest in dance began at an early age, but met with the disapproval of her father, a violent bully.

Clarke attended Stephens College, Johns Hopkins University, Bennington College, and University of North Carolina. As a result of dance lessons at each of these schools, she trained under the Martha Graham technique, the Humphrey-Weidman technique, and the Hanya Holm method of modern dance. She married Bert Clarke to escape her father's control, so she could study dance under the masters in New York City. Their daughter Wendy was born in 1944. Her marriage to Bert ended in divorce in 1963. She began her career as a dancer in the New York avant-garde modern dance movement. She was an avid participant in dance lessons and performances at the Young Women's Hebrew Association.

In 1972, Clarke was a signatory to a campaign of Ms. magazine, "We Have Had Abortions", which called for an end to "archaic laws" limiting reproductive freedom; the participants encouraged women to share their stories and take action.

== Short films ==
In her first film, Dance in the Sun (1953), she adapted a choreography of Daniel Nagrin. The New York Dance Film Society selected it as the best dance film of the year. In Dance in the Sun (1953), Clarke made use of rhythmic shots, shooting a dance on stage and then cutting from the stage to the beach and back and forth throughout the film. She crossed over from being a dancer, to being a filmmaker and expressing her art through a new medium.

Clarke studied filmmaking with Hans Richter at the City College of New York after making In Paris Parks (1954). In 1955, she became a member of the Independent Filmmakers of America and was part of a circle of independent filmmakers in Greenwich Village such as Maya Deren, Stan Brakhage, Jonas Mekas, and Lionel Rogosin.

In A Moment in Love, Clarke used abstract line and color to capture pure dance. Clarke's film Bridges Go-Round (1958) is a major example of abstract expressionism in film, with two alternative soundtracks, one with electronic music by Louis and Bebe Barron and the other is jazz orientated and was created by Teo Macero. She used the camera to create a sense of motion while filming inanimate structures. She was also involved with films produced by the US Information Agency for the 1958 Brussels World Exposition.

She received an Academy Award nomination for Skyscraper (1959) with two other documentary filmmakers. Mainly shot in 1958, the short film captures the construction of 666 Fifth Avenue that began in 1957. The 20-minute film includes shots of the Roxy Theatre which was demolished the year Skyscraper was released. In 1959, it won the Golden Gate Award at the San Francisco International Film Festival.

A Scary Time (1960), showing poverty and disease among children in Third World nations, was produced by UNICEF in consultation with Thorold Dickinson. It features music by Peggy Glanville-Hicks.

== Features released in the 1960s ==
Clarke described the impact her experience as a woman had on her filmmaking:

There are several reasons why I succeeded at all. One, I had enough money that I didn't have to become a secretary to survive. And secondly, I have developed this personality, this way of being...I happen to have chosen a field where I have to be out there, to constantly connect, to be in charge of vast amounts of money, equipment and people. And that is not particularly a woman's role in our society...I identified with black people because I couldn't deal with the woman question and I transposed it. I could understand very easily the black problems, and I somehow equated them to how I felt. When I did The Connection, which was about junkies, I knew nothing about junk and cared less. It was a symbol--people who are on the outside. I always felt alone, and on the outside of the culture that I was in. I grew up in a time when women weren't running things. They still aren't.

In 1962 she described her objectives: "I'm revolting against the conventions of movies. Who says a film has to cost a million dollars and be safe and innocuous enough to satisfy every 12-year-old in America?"

=== The Connection ===
Her first feature film The Connection (1961), from the play by Jack Gelber, concerns heroin-addicted jazz musicians, and was part of the emergence of a New York independent feature film movement. The film heralded a new style addressing relevant social issues in black-and-white low-budget films. Clarke intended the film to be used as a test case in a successful fight to abolish New York State's censorship rules. It also served as a commentary on the failures of cinema verité. It is meant to appear to document the spontaneous interactions of a contemporary, specific lifestyle (Bohemian New York of the early 1960s).

The Connection generated controversy and discussion in the downtown New York City arts community. The original play by Jack Gelber had been condemned by mainstream critics during its performances off-Broadway, but had still drawn an audience that included "Leonard Bernstein, Anita Loos, Salvador Dalí and Lillian Hellman, who likened it to 'a fine time at the circus'".

Clarke was determined to film the play, and once completed, it received favorable reviews. It was screened out of competition at the Cannes Film Festival in 1961, where again it was received positively. American Beat Generation celebrities who were in Europe at the time traveled to Cannes to show support for Clarke's film. Screenings of The Connection in New York State were subsequently banned following complaints alleging indecency, based on a shot that included a pornographic magazine and a word deemed obscene. At the time, New York State only permitted films to be publicly screened if they had received a license from the State's board of censors. Another attempt was made to publicly screen the film a year later, only for the police to intervene, as the filmmakers still did not have a license from the State's board of censors. Following these incidents, critical reviews of The Connection became predominantly negative. The situation made it difficult for Clarke to organize funding and distribution for her film projects.

While filming The Connection, she fell in love with actor Carl Lee. Following her divorce from Bert Clarke, she began a relationship with Lee that lasted until his death in 1986 from AIDS, which he had contracted from his use of a dirty hypodermic needle.

=== Later in the decade ===
In 1961, Clarke signed the manifesto "Statement for a New American Cinema", and in 1962, she co-founded The Film-Makers' Cooperative in New York with Jonas Mekas.

Robert Frost: A Lover's Quarrel With the World (1963), directed by Clarke and starring the poet Robert Frost, won the Academy Award for Documentary Feature.

Based on a novel by Warren Miller, Clarke's feature, The Cool World (1964), followed the life of a young man who rose to be the leader of a juvenile gang. The first movie to dramatize a story on Black street gangs without relying upon Hollywood-style moralizing, it was shot on location in Harlem and produced by Frederick Wiseman. The Cool World was the first independently made film to be screened at the Venice International Film Festival.

Clarke directed a feature-length interview with a gay Black male prostitute, Portrait of Jason (1967) which was selected for the New York Film Festival. Edited from 12 hours of interview footage, the film was described by Lauren Rabinovitz as an exploration of one "person's character while it simultaneously addresses the range and limitations of cinema-verité style". Portrait of Jason (1967) had a mixed response from American critics. With the exception of non-mainstream publications, reviewers were generally negative focusing on Clarke's supposed "morbid viewpoint and the lack of production polish". Portrait of Jason had a better reception in Europe. The film was distributed by the Film-Makers Distribution Center. Co-founded by Clarke in 1966, the distributor closed in 1970 after encountering financial difficulties.

== Video works and other projects ==
In the 1970s and early 1980s, Clarke experimented with live video performance, returning to her roots as a dancer. She formed The TeePee Video Space Troupe at her Hotel Chelsea penthouse. This group included video artists Andy Gurian, Bruce Ferguson, Stephanie Palewski, DeeDee Halleck, Vickie Polan, Shrider Bapat, Clarke's daughter Wendy Clarke, and many others. The Troupe were also early experimenters with taped video performance, installation and documentation.

After working on video films for several years at the Hotel Chelsea, Clarke was approached by Roger Corman to work on his next film Crazy Mama (1975). This sparked disagreements over creative approaches. Clarke realized that Corman was expecting a protègé without film experience. In a 1985 interview, Clarke stated that she did not believe the situation would have occurred had she been a male filmmaker:

Clearly he couldn't be talking to an established filmmaker who had gotten prizes and stuff. He didn't know who I was at all. [...] Would he ever talk to a man like that? He didn't trust me, that's for sure. There's deep discrimination against women artists that is still very strong. I was a representative of tokenism. I was relied on to be the woman filmmaker. No one person can carry that burden. There's no question that my career would have been different if I was a man, but if I was a man I would be a different human being.

From time to time, members of the pioneering video collective Videofreex were part of the Troupe: David Cort, Parry Teasdale, Chuck Kennedy, Skip Blumberg, Bart Freidman, and Nancy Cain. The troupe worked in and around the Hotel Chelsea on West 23rd St in New York City, often setting up multiple cameras and monitors on the roof or in the stairwell. The Chelsea guest participants included Viva, Arthur C. Clarke (no relation), Severn Darden, and Agnès Varda. The troupe went on tour to colleges and media centers, including Bucknell College in Pennsylvania, where they worked with drama and dance students in a massive evening performance in the student center, and SUNY Cortland, where they created a video mural with art students.

Clarke's final film was Ornette: Made in America (1985), a documentary profile of the jazz saxophonist and composer Ornette Coleman.

== Other activities ==
In addition to directing her own films, Clarke played an independent filmmaker in the cinéma vérité-style comedy Lions Love (1969) by Agnès Varda. Clarke also appears briefly in the documentary He Stands in a Desert Counting the Seconds of His Life (1986) by Jonas Mekas. Clarke's legs appeared in John Lennon and Yoko Ono's 1971 film Up Your Legs Forever.

Clarke lectured regularly, speaking at theaters and museums. During the period between 1971 and 1974, Clarke led number of Teepee touring workshops in a variety of venues and institutions including the Kitchen, the Museum of Modern art ('Open Circuits'), Antioch College, Baltimore, Wesleyan College, Bucknell University, Film Study Center, Hampshire College and the University of Buffalo. Clarke became a professor at UCLA in 1975, teaching film and video until 1983.

== Death and legacy ==
Clarke died of a stroke in Boston, Massachusetts after a struggle with Alzheimer's disease, shortly before her 78th birthday.

The only full-length feature to receive wide media coverage during Clarke's lifetime was The Connection. It was not her only film subject to bans by New York State censors, or distribution challenges posed by the lack of infrastructure for independent filmmakers. Clarke's reputation languished for many years, during a period when she was "marginalized, written out of histories and dismissed as a dilettante". There has been renewed interest in her filmmaking, however. The first Shirley Clarke Avant-Garde Filmmaker Award was presented to Barbara Hammer in October 2006. Thomas Cohen, in a 2012 book discussing her career, described her features as "films considered essential works of New American Cinema".

From 2012 onwards, Milestone Films undertook "Project Shirley", an in-depth, eight-year project to release restored versions of many of Clarke's films on DVD and Blu-ray, preceded by limited theatrical runs. This encompassed Ornette: Made in America (Volume 1, November 11, 2014), Portrait of Jason (Volume 2, November 11, 2014), The Connection (Volume 3, February 24, 2015) and The Magic Box: The Films of Shirley Clarke. 1927-1986 (Volume 4, November 15, 2016).

== Filmography ==
- A Dance in the Sun (1953)
- In Paris Parks (1954)
- Bullfight (1955)
- A Moment in Love (1957)
- Brussels "Loops (1958)
- Bridges-Go-Round (1958)
- Skyscraper (1959) with Willard Van Dyke and Irving Jacoby
- A Scary Time (1960)
- The Connection (1961)
- Robert Frost: A Lover's Quarrel with the World (1963)
- The Cool World (1963)
- Portrait of Jason (1967)
- Man in Polar Regions (1967)
- Trans (1978)
- One Two Three (1978)
- Mysterium; Initiation (1978)
- Savage/Love (1981)
- Tongues (1982)
- Ornette: Made in America (1985)

== See also ==
- Experimental film
- New American Cinema
- Women's cinema
- List of female film and television directors
- List of LGBT-related films directed by women
- Modernist film
