= Marshall Fine =

American author and journalist

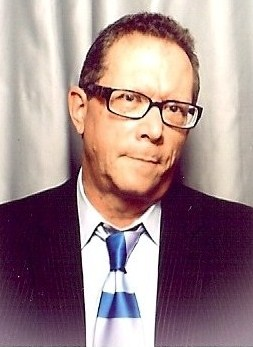
- Born: November 7, 1950 (age 75); Minneapolis, Minnesota
- Occupations: Journalist; film critic; filmmaker

Marshall Fine (born November 7, 1950) is an American author, journalist, filmmaker and film critic from Minneapolis, Minnesota.

== Early life ==
Fine grew up in Richfield, Minnesota, a Minneapolis suburb, until he was 13. His family subsequently moved to St. Louis Park, Minnesota, another Minneapolis suburb.

== Career ==
Fine began his career as a critic at 18, writing reviews of rock concerts and albums for the Minneapolis Star while a freshman at the University of Minnesota. He worked in newspapers from 1973-2004, at papers in Durango, Colo.; Lawrence, Kan.; Jackson, Miss.; Sioux Falls, S.D.; Rochester, NY; Marin County, Calif.; and Westchester County, NY. He subsequently served as film/TV critic for Star magazine from 2004-2016, before retiring from reviewing.

He conducted the Playboy Interview with Howard Stern and Tim Robbins for Playboy Magazine.

Fine directed a documentary short, "Flo Fox's Dicthology," that was selected for the Woodstock and Amsterdam film festivals in 2002. His documentary feature, "Do You Sleep in the Nude?," about film critic Rex Reed, was selected for the Hamptons Film Festival (2007) and the South by Southwest Film Festival (2008). His documentary, "Robert Klein Still Can't Stop His Leg," about comedian Robert Klein, had its debut at the 2016 South by Southwest Film Festival and subsequently played at Tribeca and the San Francisco Jewish Film Festival. It premiered on the Starz network in March 2017 and is currently available to rent through Amazon. He directed the New York Film Critics Circle's 2020 awards video.

Fine is a four-time former chairman of the New York Film Critics Circle: 1992, 2002, 2006 and 2015. He was named general manager of the NYFCC in 2016 and retired from the position in 2021. He received a special award from the group in 2022 for "service to the group and his many decades on the New York film scene."

As a contributing editor for Cigar Aficionado magazine, he has written more than 40 cover stories since 2009. Among his cover story subjects were Jay-Z, Arnold Schwarzenegger, Brad Paisley, Sylvester Stallone, Sean Combs, Jeff Bridges, Stanley Tucci and Jeremy Irons.

He helped create and hosted the Journal-News Film Club at the Jacob Burns Film Center in Pleasantville, NY, from 2001-2004. Fine subsequently created, produced and hosted the Emelin Film Club at the Emelin Theater in Mamaroneck, NY, from 2005-2014. He hosted the Thalia Film Club at Symphony Space on Manhattan's Upper West Side from 2010-14.

He was named critic-in-residence at The Picture House Regional Film Center in Pelham, NY, in 2014, where he produced and hosted The Picture House Film Club until his retirement in May 2021. From March 2020, the film club moved online because of the coronavirus pandemic. Prior to his retirement, he hosted screenings of more than 400 films at the four venues. He received the Harold Lloyd Lifetime Achievement Award from The Picture House in 2021.

He served as an adjunct professor of journalism at Purchase College, SUNY, for the 2020-21 academic year.

An exhibit of his photography, "Natural & Unnatural," was shown at the Ossining Public Library Gallery in January 2023.

His novel, "The Autumn of Ruth Winters," was a Kindle best-seller after it was released by Lake Union Publishing in November 2024. His second novel, "Hemlock Lane," was released in November 2025.

On July 16, 2012, he provoked anger when he posted the first negative review of The Dark Knight Rises. His review was posted on review site Rotten Tomatoes and within minutes, started receiving hateful comments and death threats. Rotten Tomatoes had to remove the link to his review and temporarily disable comments on reviews for the movie. When asked about the situation in an interview, he said "It's part of the job."

He is a founding member of Westchester Collaborative Theater, and wrote several plays – one-act and full-length – produced by the company.

== Bibliography ==
- Bloody Sam: The Life and Films of Sam Peckinpah (1991)
- Harvey Keitel: The Art of Darkness (1997)
- Accidental Genius: How John Cassavetes Invented the American Independent Film (2005)
