= Black Film Archive =

Online database of streamable Black films released from 1915–1979

- Website type: Film database
- Available in: English
- Country of origin: United States
- Founder: Maya Cade
- Website: blackfilmarchive.com
- Launched: 26 August 2021; 5 years ago

Black Film Archive is an online database of Black films released from 1898–1999 that are available to view via streaming platforms. The site was launched by Maya Cade in 2021.

== History ==
Black Film Archive is a curated database of Black films released between 1898 and 1999 that are currently streaming on online platforms like YouTube, Netflix, and Tubi. Some of the films are free to view due to public domain laws. The site is inclusive of approximately 250 Black films as of its August 26, 2021 launch. The films range in genre and are organized by decade.

Maya Cade, the site's creator, is an American screenwriter, audience editor for The Criterion Collection, and owner of Milestone Films. The genesis for Black Film Archive came in June 2020, after Cade posted a viral Twitter thread of classic Black films amid the George Floyd protests, to provide solace and comfort to others. She then began to research and assemble a database of Black films. She focused on historical selections in part because she has felt disconnected from modern Black cinema. Cade intentionally limited the database to movies released up to 1979 because film studios heavily invested in Black cinema until the commercial failure of 1978's The Wiz.

One of her goals for the archive was to introduce cinephiles to unfamiliar and alternative depictions of Black people and Black culture "whether people agree with the portrayals or not." In putting together the archive, she selected films oriented to Black audiences and those with Black leads or Black production teams. Part of her selection process was to determine whether people "need" a particular film and what it offers. Certain films could not be included because they are not currently streaming, such as Killer of Sheep.

== Selections ==
Some of the site's selections include:

- Within Our Gates (1920)
- Siren of the Tropics (1927)
- Carmen Jones (1954)
- Anna Lucasta (1958)
- The Cry of Jazz (1959)
- Shaft (1971)
- The Black Gestapo (1975)
- Killing Time (1979)

In an interview with The New York Times, Cade cited these selections as her favorite films of each decade from the 1920s to the 1970s:

- Hallelujah (1929)
- The Green Pastures (1936)
- Commandment Keeper Church, Beaufort South Carolina, May 1940 (1940)
- The World, the Flesh and the Devil (1959)
- A Man Called Adam (1966)
- Claudine (1974)

== Accolades ==
Maya Cade has received the following awards and nominations:

- 2021 – Special Award, NYFCC
- 2021 – Outstanding Achievement by A Woman in The Film Industry (Nominee), Alliance of Women Film Journalists EDA Awards

== See also ==
- African American cinema
