= After the Dance (play) =

Play written by Terence Rattigan

- Programme for original production
- Written by: Terence Rattigan
- Original language: English
- Genre: Drama

Premiere
- Date premiered: 21 June 1939
- Place premiered: St James's Theatre, London, England

After the Dance is a play by Terence Rattigan which premièred at the St James's Theatre, London, on 21 June 1939. It was not one of Rattigan's more successful plays, closing after only sixty performances, a failure that led to its exclusion from his first volume of Collected Plays. Critics have tended to attribute this relative contemporary failure to the play's darkness which may have reminded audiences of the approaching European war.

However, the 2010 revival of the play was a commercial and critical success with The Guardian's theatre critic Michael Billington stating that Thea Sharrock's production starring Benedict Cumberbatch confirmed that Rattigan is one of the "supreme dramatists of the 20th century".

== Summary ==
David and Joan Scott-Fowler were 'bright young things' of the 1920s, whose ambition is to treat everything as trivial and to live lives of pure sensation. They always maintained that they married for amusement and not for love. However, Helen Banner, a serious young woman, has fallen in love with David and is determined to change his lifestyle, free him from Joan, stop him from drinking and re-awaken the serious historian in him. Unfortunately, Joan does indeed love David very deeply and is trapped by her posture of carelessness. At a party they are holding, Joan is bruised by the clash between private agony and public joy and she kills herself. The characters are shattered by the revelation and even though David and Helen plan to get away from this life, the play ends with a clear sign that David will continue as he did.

== Revivals ==
The play remained largely forgotten until a BBC2 television production by Stuart Burge in December 1992 starring Imogen Stubbs as young determined Helen. It was revived by the Oxford Stage Company in 2002.

A National Theatre revival directed by Thea Sharrock was staged in May 2010. It was led by Benedict Cumberbatch as David Scott-Fowler with Nancy Carroll as his wife Joan and Adrian Scarborough as John Reid to commercial and critical success. According to The Guardian's theatre critic Michael Billington, reviewing Sharrock's production, the play confirms Rattigan as one of the "supreme dramatists of the 20th century". The 2010 revival won four Olivier Awards including Best Revival.

Noel and Company presented a staged reading of the play in 2012 at the National Arts Club in New York City, directed by Keith Merrill. The cast included Tina Benko, John Bolton, Jessica Dickey, Amy Rutberg, Max Gordon Moore and Tug Rice.
