= Frankenstein (2011 play) =

Stage adaptation by Nick Dear of the novel of the same name

- Original language: English
- Written by: Nick Dear (adaptation); Mary Shelley (novel)
- Genre: Drama

Premiere
- Date: Royal National Theatre
- Place: London, England

Frankenstein is a stage adaptation by Nick Dear of Mary Shelley's 1818 novel Frankenstein; or, The Modern Prometheus. Its world premiere was at the Royal National Theatre on 5 February 2011, where it officially opened on 22 February. This production was directed by Danny Boyle with a cast including Benedict Cumberbatch and Jonny Lee Miller, with the two lead actors alternating the roles of Victor Frankenstein and the Creature. Frankenstein ended its run on 2 May 2011.

== Live filming ==
On 17 March and 24 March 2011, the production was broadcast to cinemas around the world as a part of the National Theatre Live programme.

The National Theatre's production of Frankenstein returned to cinema screens worldwide for a limited season in June, July and December 2012, as well as for encore screenings in October and November 2013. A third encore screening was announced, beginning 25 October 2014. It was seen for around 800,000 people on cinemas.

Another encore screening was made across the United States on 22 and 29 October 2018 in honour of the novel's 200th anniversary, so viewers could see both actors play both roles.

The films were made available as part of the National Theatre's NT at Home series for a week from 30 April 2020, with Benedict Cumberbatch as the creature available starting from 30 April, and Jonny Lee Miller as the creature starting from 1 May.

== Plot ==
Victor Frankenstein creates a monster from human corpses. Once the Creature is brought to life, however, Victor is appalled by his creation's deformed appearance and flees in terror. The Creature wanders through the streets of Ingolstadt, lost and confused. Meanwhile, Gretel, a prostitute, is being assaulted in an alleyway and calls for help. The Creature frightens off her attacker, but Gretel recoils from her saviour, and a mob of villagers chase the Creature away. The next morning, the Creature sees the dawn for the first time and finds Victor's journal. He is then attacked by two beggars when he tries to take their food.

The Creature hides in an old cottage which is inhabited by a married couple, Felix and Agatha, and Felix's elderly, blind father, De Lacey. The Creature comes to care for them and brings them food in secret. De Lacey finds and befriends the Creature and, over the course of a year, teaches him to speak, read and write. The Creature reads Victor's journal and learns about his creator. De Lacey also teaches the Creature about love, and the Creature dreams of having a female partner. One day, Felix and Agatha come home and find the Creature; much as the Creature had feared, they are repulsed by him and drive him out. Enraged, the Creature sets fire to the cottage, killing the entire family. He swears revenge on Victor for bringing him into a world that hates him.

By Lake Geneva, Elizabeth Lavenza, Victor's fiancée, is playing hide and seek with William, Victor's younger brother, and her maids. They all leave William blindfolded while they go off to hide. The Creature tries to befriend William, and tells him he is looking for a man called Frankenstein. William says that's his surname and Victor is his brother. William sees the Creature's face and tries to run, but the Creature catches him and carries him off. That night Victor and his father, Monsieur Frankenstein, find William's dead body, with pages from Victor's journal. Victor realizes that the Creature killed his brother, and resolves to destroy him.

Victor tracks the Creature to Mont Blanc and confronts him at the peak. The Creature asks Victor to create a female mate for him, promising in return to leave humanity alone; the Creature also threatens to destroy Victor's life if he refuses. Left with little choice and intrigued by the challenge, Victor agrees. He moves to Scotland and, in a matter of months, creates a "bride" for the Creature. When the Creature comes to claim her, however, Victor refuses to give her to him, aghast at the possibility of their creating a race of monsters. He destroys the female and the Creature disappears into the night, swearing revenge.

Victor returns to Geneva and marries Elizabeth. On their wedding night, he confesses what he has done, and promises that he will put an end to the situation that night. He leaves the room intent on destroying the Creature, but the Creature appears in their bridal suite and rapes and murders Elizabeth. Victor bursts into the room with a gun, but can't bring himself to shoot his creation, and the Creature escapes. Victor insists that he can bring Elizabeth back to life, but his father stops him, ordering him to be taken away.

Victor pursues the Creature to the Arctic Circle, where he collapses, frostbitten and exhausted. The Creature comes to see what has happened to Victor and, thinking he has died, begs his forgiveness. He gives Victor seal meat and pours wine into his mouth to revive him, and tells his creator he loves him. Victor admits he does not know how to love, and insists in continuing his hate-driven pursuit of the Creature. Both resigned to their fate, the Creature leads Victor on into the fog.

== Differences from the novel ==
- The story is told from the Creature's perspective rather than from Victor's. Because of this, the audience witnesses events such as his relationship with De Lacey firsthand rather than in backstory.
- The frame story involving Captain Robert Walton is dispensed with entirely, as well as much of Victor Frankenstein's backstory. The play opens directly with the Creature's "birth".
- Mr. De Lacey teaches the Creature to read and speak; in the novel the Creature reads on his own and learns to speak just by observing the family.
- The Creature kills the De Lacey family in revenge for their rejection of him, which he does not in the novel.
- Elizabeth Lavenza is Victor's cousin rather than his adopted sister. (They are cousins in the original release of the novel but changed to adopted siblings in the 1831 rewrite. In the play, they remain cousins.)
- The Creature doesn't leave for Geneva until a full year after his birth, rather than four months in the novel.
- The character of Justine, William's nurse, is cut, and William's murder is never solved. The character of Henry Clerval is also cut.
- Monsieur Frankenstein personally brings Victor home from Scotland, and Victor is never imprisoned due to the absence of Clerval from the story.
- The Creature's mate is partially animated and is able to walk in a trance-like state before she is destroyed; in the novel she is not animated at all.
- The Creature rapes Elizabeth before killing her in the play, this does not happen in the novel.
- Victor Frankenstein and Elizabeth stay in Geneva on their wedding night, rather than Villa Lavenza by Lake Como in the novel.
- Felix and Agatha are a married couple in the play, whereas they are siblings in the novel. The character of Safie has been cut.
- Victor dies at the end of the novel; in the play he does not.

== Original cast ==
- Benedict Cumberbatch – Victor Frankenstein/The Creature
- Jonny Lee Miller – The Creature/Victor Frankenstein
- Ella Smith – Gretel, a prostitute
- John Killoran – Gustav, a beggar
- Steven Elliott – Klaus, a beggar
- Karl Johnson – De Lacey, a blind scholar
- Daniel Millar – Felix, his son
- Lizzie Winkler – Agatha, wife of Felix
- Andreea Padurariu – The Female Creature
- Haydon Downing/William Nye/Jared Richard – William Frankenstein, Victor's younger brother
- George Harris – M Frankenstein, Victor's father
- Naomie Harris – Elizabeth Lavenza, Victor's fiancée
- Daniel Ings – Servant 1
- Martin Chamberlain – Servant 2
- Ella Smith – Clarice, a maid
- John Stahl – Ewan, a Scottish crofter
- Mark Armstrong – Rab, his nephew
- Josie Daxter – Ensemble

== Production Team ==
- Danny Boyle – Director
- Mark Tildesley – Set Designer
- Suttirat Anne Larlarb – Costume Designer
- Bruno Poet – Lighting Designer
- Ed Clarke, Underworld – Sound Designer
- Toby Sedgwick – Director of Movement
- Kate Waters – Fight Director
- Jan Sewell – makeup artist

== Awards ==
Benedict Cumberbatch and Jonny Lee Miller shared both the Laurence Olivier Award and London Evening Standard Theatre Award for Best Actor in a Leading Role in a Play for their respective performances. Cumberbatch also won the Critics' Circle Theatre Awards' Best Performance by an Actor in a Leading Role in a Play. The play also won the Olivier Award for Best Lighting for the filament light bulb installation designed by Bruno Poet.

== Soundtrack ==
Frankenstein: Music from the Play

Soundtrack album by Underworld
- Released: 17 March 2011
- Length: 60:30
- Label: underworldlive.com

Professional ratings
Review scores
| Source | Rating |
|---|---|
| The Independent | 3/5 stars |
| PopMatters | 8/10 stars |

Electronica duo Underworld provided the score for the play. They had previously worked on the score for Boyle's film Sunshine. Underworld released the soundtrack for Frankenstein in both digital and CD form through their website on 17 March 2011.

=== Track listing ===
1. "Overture" – 17:11
2. "Incubator" – 1:47
3. "Industrial Revolution" – 3:51
4. "Dawn of Eden" – 3:28
5. "Beggars Attack and Creature Alone" – 0:58
6. "De Lacey Cottage Guitar" – 0:44
7. "Not a King (Snow)" – 1:55
8. "Fairy Folk and Nightingale" – 2:28
9. "Female Creature Dream" – 3:45
10. "Creature Banished and Cottagers Burn" – 2:47
11. "Hide and Seek, Body in a Boat" – 1:43
12. "The Alps" – 1:43
13. "Frankenstein House" – 0:42
14. "Sea Shanty and Croft" – 4:07
15. "Bride Creature.Walk" – 1:10
16. "Bride Creature.Death" – 1:17
17. "Wedding Song and Bedroom" – 2:34
18. "Arctic Wastes" – 6:18
19. "Come Scientist Destroy" – 2:08

== Later productions ==
Following the National Theatre success, Nick Dear's Frankenstein has been staged in various theaters throughout the world, including the Sydney Opera House in 2013, the Denver Center for the Performing Arts in 2016, and a French-language production in Quebec City. It has also been licensed for high school performance. In 2016, Fossil Ridge High School in Fort Collins, Colorado, became the first high school to perform the play. In 2021 The Court Theatre in Christchurch, New Zealand also put on Frankenstein which opened before their August lockdown and then closed and reopened again in September. This production featured an ensemble of third year Performing Arts Students at the National Academy of Singing and Dramatic Art (NASDA).
