= Milestone Films =

Milestone Film and Video is an independent film distribution company, founded in 1990 in the United States by Dennis Doros and Amy Heller. The company researches and distributes cinematographic material from around the world, including silent film, post-war foreign film renaissance, contemporary American independent features, documentaries and foreign films.

== History ==
Milestone was founded in 1990 in New York City by Dennis Doros and Amy Heller, who had both worked in the film restoration and distribution industries. The company now operates out of Harrington Park, New Jersey. Prominent supporters such as Martin Scorsese and Jonathan Demme have presented Milestone's film releases in the past.

Milestone has distributed the works of Alfred Hitchcock, Luchino Visconti, Pier Paolo Pasolini, F.W. Murnau, Orson Welles, Margot Benacerraf, Shirley Clarke, Lionel Rogosin, Mikhail Kalatozov, Luis Buñuel, Takeshi Kitano, Hirokazu Kore-eda, Alan Berliner, Charles Burnett, Eleanor Antin, Rob Epstein, Jeffrey Friedman, George T. Nierenberg, Kathleen Collins, Ayoka Chenzira, Erich von Stroheim and Philip Haas, among many others.

On May 6, 2025, it was announced Maya Cade, creator of the Black Film Archive, would be the next president and owner of Milestone.

== Restoration ==
Milestone restores and preserves old footage. In 2013, Dennis Doros, Milestone's co-founder and board member of the Association of Moving Image Archivists (AMIA), gave a series of talks to universities and film societies about the search for Shirley Clarke's film Portrait of Jason. Thought lost for many years, the original materials surfaced in the Wisconsin Center for Film and Theater Research archives. Dennis Doros was elected President of AMIA, serving from 2017 to 2021.
