= Cumberbatch =

Cumberbatch is an English toponymic surname associated with the village of Comberbach in Cheshire, England. It is a common variation on the surname Comberbach; other variations include Camberbirch, Comberbeach, Comberedge, Cumberbach, Cumberbirch, Cumberidge and Cumberpatch.

Notable persons with the surname include:

- Archie Cumberbatch (1879–?), West Indian cricketer
- Benedict Cumberbatch (born 1976), English actor
- Clyde Cumberbatch (1936–2017), Trinidadian cricket umpire
- Francis Cumberbatch, Guyanese lawyer and judge
- Henry Arnold Cumberbatch (1858–1918), British diplomat
- Henry Carlton Cumberbatch (1900–1966), British navy officer
- James Cumberbatch (1909–1972), English professional rugby league footballer
- Jane Cumberbatch, British interior designer
- Meta Cumberbatch (1900–1978), Trinidad-born pianist, composer, writer and cultural activist
- Robert William Cumberbatch (1821–1876), British diplomat
- Stephen Cumberbatch (1909–2011), West Indian Anglican priest
- Timothy Carlton (born 1939), born Timothy Carlton Cumberbatch, English character actor, father of Benedict Cumberbatch
- Tulivu-Donna Cumberbatch (1950–2022), American jazz singer
- Val Cumberbatch (1911–1973), English professional rugby league footballer

== See also ==
- Stuart Comberbach (1952–2025), Zimbabwean diplomat and politician
- Keith Cumberpatch (1927–2013), New Zealand field hockey player
