= Barnton =

Barnton may refer to:

- Barnton, Cheshire, a village in Cheshire, United Kingdom
  - Barnton F.C., a football club located in Barnton, Cheshire
  - Christ Church, Barnton, a church located in Barnton, Cheshire
- Barnton, Edinburgh, an area of Edinburgh, United Kingdom
  - Charlotte Baptist Chapel, also known as Barnton Baptist church, an independent church located in Barnton, Edinburgh
  - Barnton Quarry, a military bunker in Edinburgh
