= Henry Cumberbatch =

Henry Cumberbatch may refer to:

- Henry Alfred Cumberbatch (1858–1918), British diplomat
- Henry Carlton Cumberbatch (1900–1966), his son, British Royal Navy officer
