= Sophie Hunter =

English theatre director (born 1978)

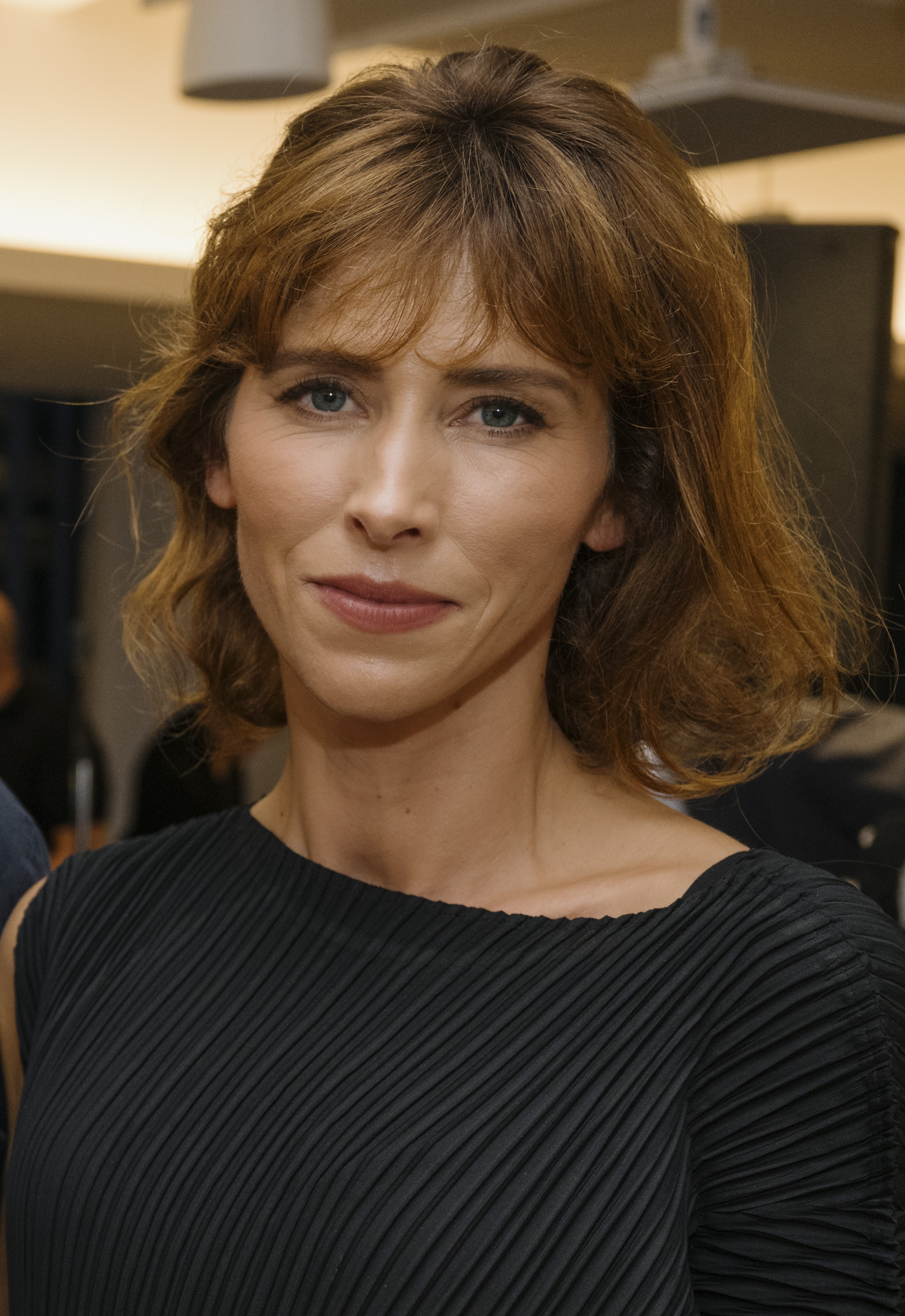
- Hunter in 2024
- Born: Sophie Irene Hunter; 16 March 1978 (age 48); London, England
- Education: University of Oxford; L'École Internationale de Théâtre Jacques Lecoq
- Occupations: Theatre director; playwright; actress; singer
- Spouse: Benedict Cumberbatch (m. 2015)
- Children: 3
- Relatives: Timothy Carlton (father-in-law); Wanda Ventham (mother-in-law)
- Family: Julius Drake (uncle-in-law); Michael Gow (maternal grandfather); J. E. B. Seely (maternal great-great grandfather)
- Website: sophiehunterstudio.com

Sophie Irene Hunter (born 16 March 1978) is an English theatre director, playwright and former actress and singer. She made her directorial debut in 2007 co-directing the experimental play The Terrific Electric at the Barbican Pit after winning the Oxford Samuel Beckett Theatre Trust Award with her theatre collective Boileroom. In addition, she has directed an Off-Off-Broadway revival of Henrik Ibsen's Ghosts (2010) at Access Theatre, the performance art titled Lucretia (2011) based on Benjamin Britten's opera The Rape of Lucretia at Location One's Abramovic Studio in New York City, and the Phantom Limb Company's 69° South also known as Shackleton Project (2011) which premièred at the Brooklyn Academy of Music's Harvey Theatre and later toured North America.

In August 2015, Hunter directed Phaedra and The Turn of the Screw to critical acclaim for the Happy Days Enniskillen International Beckett Festival and Aldeburgh Music, respectively.

== Early life and education ==
Sophie Irene Hunter was born in Hammersmith district of London on 16 March 1978, she is the daughter of Anna Katharine (née Gow) and Charles Rupert Hunter. The couple later divorced. She has two younger brothers, and two half-siblings from her father's second marriage. She is a niece of pianist Julius Drake. Her maternal grandfather is General Sir Michael Gow, a British Army officer who worked with Prince Henry, Duke of Gloucester in the 1950s and was Aide-de-Camp General to the Queen from 1981 to 1984. Hunter's maternal great-great grandfather was First World War politician J. E. B. Seely, 1st Baron Mottistone.

Hunter was privately educated at St Paul's Girls' School in Hammersmith before studying Modern Languages with a concentration in French and Italian at the University of Oxford. After graduating from Oxford, Hunter lived in Paris to study avant-garde theatre for two years at the L'École Internationale de Théâtre Jacques Lecoq. She then trained at the Saratoga International Theatre Institute in New York City under theatre and opera director Anne Bogart.

== Career ==
=== Theatre ===
Hunter co-founded the Lacuna Theatre Company and was an associate director at Royal Court Theatre in the West End of London and Broadhurst Theatre in New York's Broadway for the play Enron. She is the co-founder and artistic director of theatre company Boileroom, which won the 2007 Oxford Samuel Beckett Theatre Trust Award for the avant-garde play The Terrific Electric. She also serves as collaborating director and dramaturge on marionette and puppetry production with the Phantom Limb Company.

Known for her avant-garde plays, Hunter has directed, performed and conceived theatre productions throughout Europe, the Middle East and North America. She directed the experimental play 69° South (2013), the New York City performance art titled Lucretia (2011) based on Benjamin Britten's opera The Rape of Lucretia and the 2010 revival of Henrik Ibsen's Ghosts. She was a member of the performance collective Militia Canteen.

In collaboration with music director Andrew Staples, Hunter directed mezzo-soprano Ruby Philogene in Phaedra (2015) at the Happy Days Enniskillen International Beckett Festival in Northern Ireland. The production was met with praise, with The Guardian saying it was "exquisitely realized," The Stage hailing it as "creative brilliance," and The Times describing it as "astonishing". She has also staged Benjamin Britten's The Turn of the Screw in Suffolk and London for Aldeburgh Music.

In June 2017, Hunter took part as narrator in Music on the Meare at Aldeburgh Festival with readings from Ovid, John Dryden and Ted Hughes alongside oboist Nicholas Daniel.

=== Creative arts ===
Hunter worked on the transfer of Punchdrunk's Sleep No More to New York City in 2011 while serving as creative director for the theatre company Emursive. She has also directed the company's theatrical experiences The Forgotten (2012) and Don't Major in Debt Student House (2012). In 2013, she developed Loma Lights (2013), one of the largest public arts programs in New York City.

=== Music ===
In 2005, Hunter recorded a French-language music album titled The Isis Project in collaboration with songwriter Guy Chambers. In 2011, she released an English-language EP titled Songs for a Boy, again with Chambers. Hunter has also collaborated with Armin van Buuren for the song "Virtual Friend" which was included in Buuren's 2010 album Mirage.

=== Film and television ===
Earlier in her career, Hunter acted in film and television. She had supporting roles in the television series Midsomer Murders (2004), Keen Eddie (2004), Mumbai Calling (2007) and Torchwood (2009). In 2004, she played Maria Osborne in the costume drama film Vanity Fair starring Reese Witherspoon and played Annabel Blythe-Smith in the 2009 thriller film Burlesque Fairytales.

In May 2017, Hunter was announced as a producer for the film adaptation of Megan Hunter's dystopian novel The End We Start From alongside her husband Cumberbatch and Adam Ackland's production company Sunnymarch, and Liza Marshall's Hera Productions.

== Recognition ==
- Oxford Samuel Beckett Theatre Trust Award (2007)
- International Artist Fellowship by Location One, New York City (2010/11)

== Personal life ==
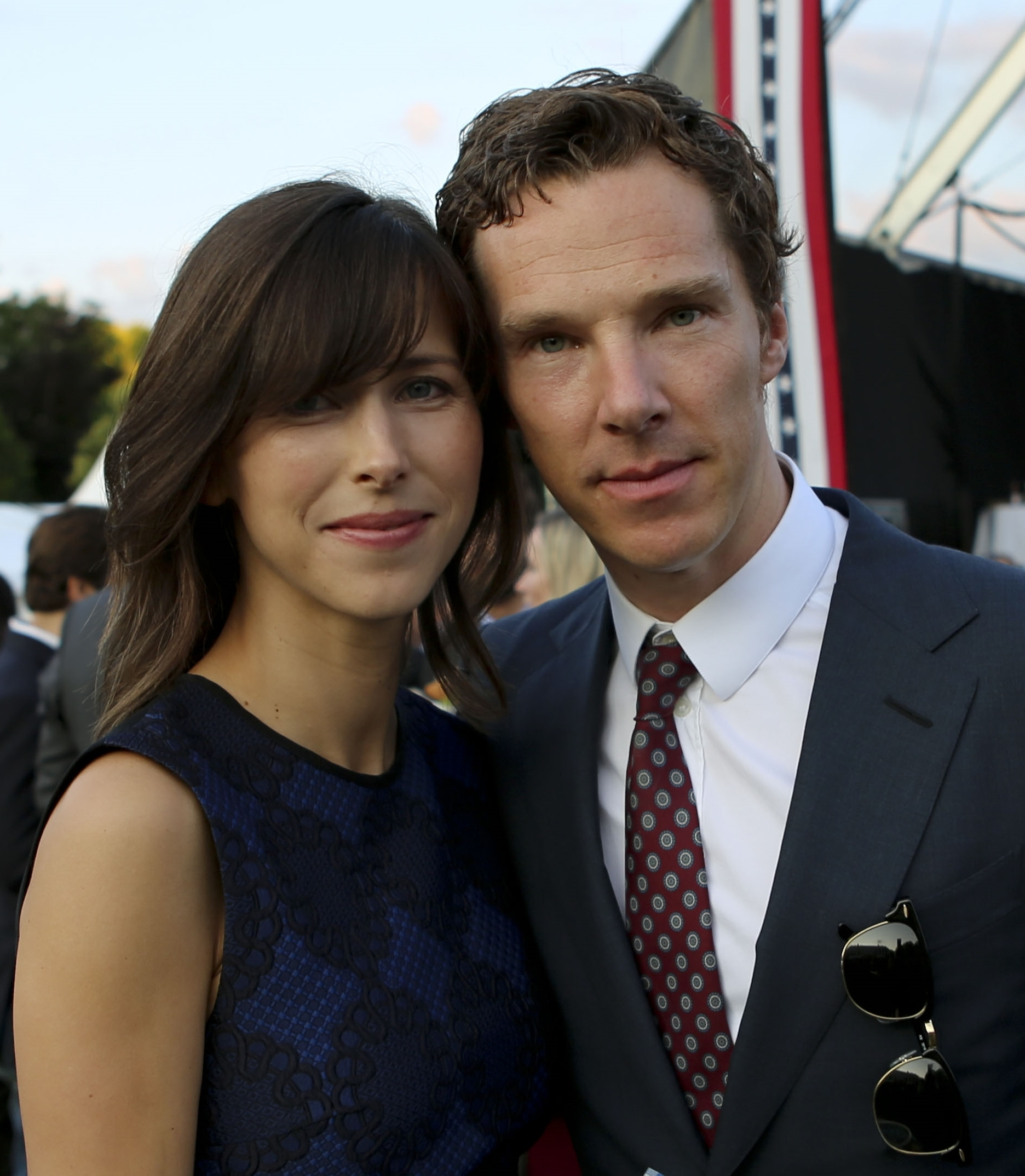
Hunter with her husband Benedict Cumberbatch in 2015

Hunter had a long-term relationship with sculptor Conrad Shawcross whom she met while studying at Oxford. Their relationship ended in early 2010. On 14 February 2015, she married actor Benedict Cumberbatch at St Peter and St Paul's Church, Mottistone on the Isle of Wight followed by a reception at Mottistone Manor. They have three sons. She is a Buddhist.

Hunter speaks fluent French and Italian. She is also a skilled pianist.

== Selected credits ==
=== Theatre ===
==== As director ====
Year	Production	Venue	Notes	Refs.
2007	The Terrific Electric	Barbican Pit, London		
2010	Ghosts	Access Theatre, New York City		
2010	Enron	Royal Court Theatre, West End; Broadhurst Theatre, Broadway	Associate director	
2011	Lucretia	Abramovic Studio, New York City		
2011	Sleep No More	New York City	Creative Director for co-producer Emursive	
2011	69° South/Shackleton Project	Brooklyn Academy of Music; North American Tour		
2012	The Forgotten	New York City		
2012	Don't Major in Debt Student House	New York City		
2013	Tesla in New York (Concert Performance)	Hopkins Center for the Arts, Dartmouth College	Artistic Director	
2013	Loma Lights	New York City		
2015	Phaedra	Necarne Castle, Northern Ireland	With Ulster Orchestra for the 4th Enniskillen International Beckett Festival	
2015	Path to Bly	Snape Maltings, Suffolk; LSO St. Luke's, London	Co-curated with Andrew Staples for Aldeburgh Music	
2015	The Turn of the Screw	Snape Maltings, Suffolk; LSO St. Luke's, London	With Aurora Orchestra for Aldeburgh Music	
2016	A Celebration of Shakespeare in Words and Song	Middle Temple Hall, London	As curator	

==== As actor ====
Year	Production	Role	Venue	Refs.
2005	Hamlet	Ophelia	Al Bustaan Festival, Beirut	
2007	Silverland	Ellen	Brits Off Broadway, Arcola, New York City	
2008	Macbeth	Witch	Lyceum Theatre	
2017	Music on the Meare	Narrator	Aldeburgh Festival, Suffolk	

=== Film and television ===
==== As producer ====
Year	Title	Refs.
2023	The End We Start From	

==== As actor ====
Year	Title	Role	Notes	Refs.
2004	Midsomer Murders	Bella Monday	TV series (Episode: "The Maid in Splendour")	
2004	Keen Eddie	Lois	TV series (Episode: "Citizen Cecil")	
2004	Vanity Fair	Maria Osborne		
2004	My Life in Film	Anna	TV series (Episode: "Rear Window")	
2004	Traffic Warden	The Girlfriend	Short	
2005	Friends & Crocodiles	Christine	TV film	
2007	Mumbai Calling	Tiffany Glass	TV series (Episode: "Pilot")	
2008	The Curse of Steptoe	Maureen Corbett	TV film	
2009	Henry VIII: The Mind of a Tyrant	Anne Boleyn	TV series	
2009	Torchwood	Vanessa	TV series (Episode: "Children of Earth: Day Four")	
2009	Burlesque Fairytales	Annabel Blythe-Smith		

== Discography ==
Title	Album details
The Isis Project (written by Guy Chambers)	Released: 6 June 2005; Label: Sleeper Sounds LLP; Format: EP, Audio CD; Language: French
"Virtual Friend" (in collaboration with Armin van Buuren)	Released: 2010; Single; Language: English
Songs for a Boy (written by Guy Chambers)	Released: 26 June 2011; Label: Sleeper Sounds LLP; Format: EP; Language: English
