= Jason Bell =

Jason Bell may refer to:

- Jason Bell (photographer) (born 1969), British portrait and fashion photographer
- Jason Bell (rugby league) (born 1971), former New Zealand rugby player
- Jason Bell (American football) (born 1978), former cornerback for the NFL's New York Giants
