= Benedict Cumberbatch =

English actor (born 1976)

Benedict Cumberbatch CBE
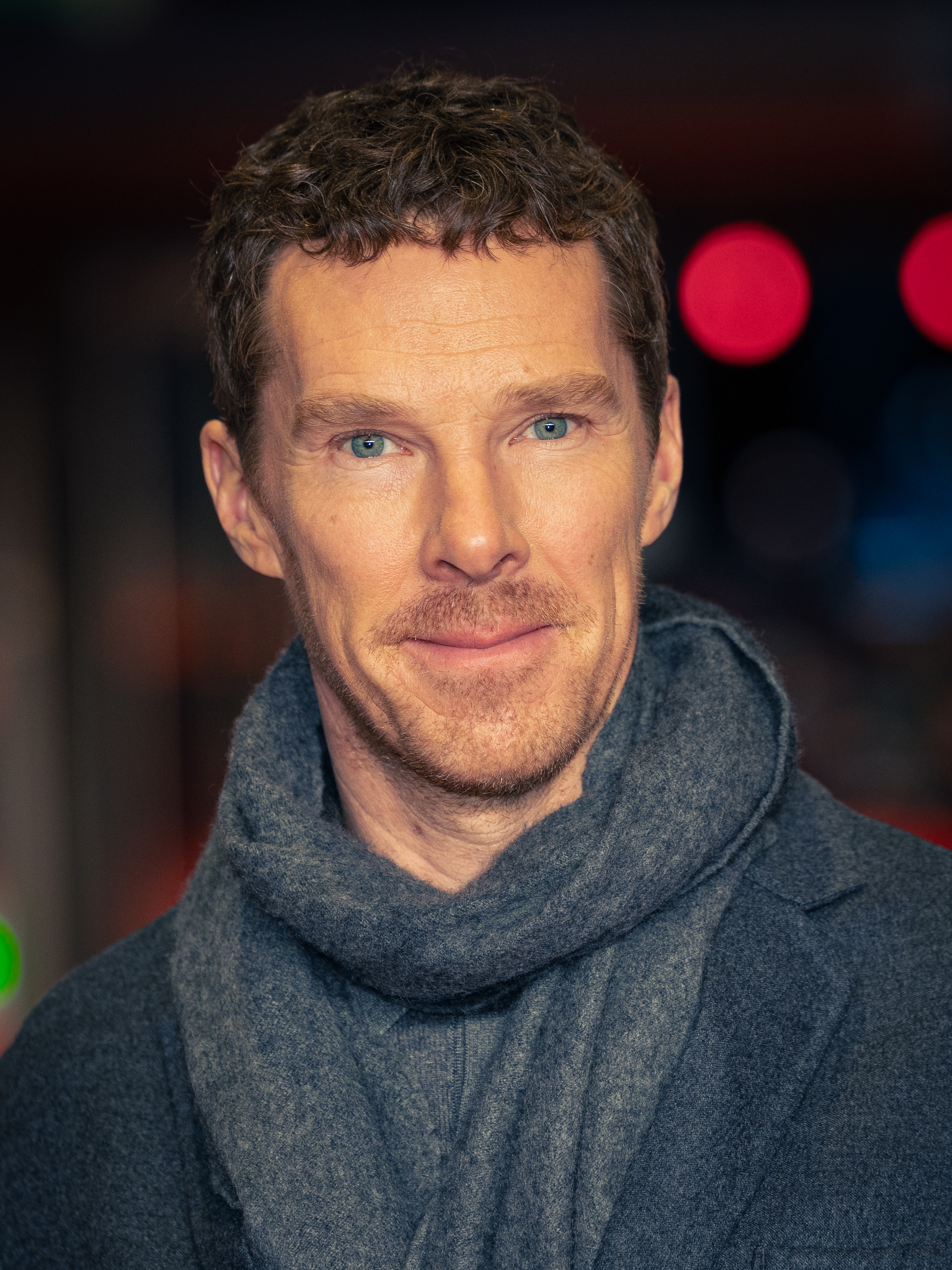
- Cumberbatch in 2025
- Born: Benedict Timothy Carlton Cumberbatch; 19 July 1976 (age 50); Hammersmith, London, England
- Education: University of Manchester; London Academy of Music and Dramatic Art
- Occupation: Actor
- Years active: 1998–present
- Works: Full list
- Spouse: Sophie Hunter (m. 2015)
- Children: 3
- Parents: Timothy Carlton; Wanda Ventham
- Relatives: Henry Carlton Cumberbatch (grandfather); Henry Alfred Cumberbatch (great-grandfather); Robert William Cumberbatch (great-great-grandfather)
- Awards: Full list
- Cumberbatch's voice from the BBC programme Front Row, 23 December 2010

Benedict Timothy Carlton Cumberbatch (born 19 July 1976) is an English actor. He has received various accolades, including a British Academy Television Award, a Primetime Emmy Award and a Laurence Olivier Award, in addition to nominations for two Academy Awards, two British Academy Film Awards, and four Golden Globes. In 2014, Time magazine named him one of the 100 most influential people in the world, and in 2015, he was appointed a CBE for services to performing arts and charity.

Cumberbatch studied drama at the Victoria University of Manchester and obtained a Master of Arts in classical acting at the London Academy of Music and Dramatic Art. He began acting in Shakespearean theatre productions before making his West End debut in Richard Eyre's revival of Hedda Gabler in 2005. Since then, he has starred in Royal National Theatre productions of After the Dance (2010) and Frankenstein (2011), winning the Laurence Olivier Award for Best Actor for the latter. In 2015, he played the title role in Hamlet at the Barbican Theatre.

Cumberbatch's television work includes his performance as Stephen Hawking in the film Hawking (2004). He gained wide recognition for portraying Sherlock Holmes in the series Sherlock from 2010 to 2017, for which he won a Primetime Emmy Award for Outstanding Lead Actor. For playing the title role in the miniseries Patrick Melrose (2018), he won the BAFTA TV Award for Best Actor.

In films, Cumberbatch received nominations for the Academy Award for Best Actor for playing Alan Turing in The Imitation Game (2014) and a volatile rancher in The Power of the Dog (2021). He has acted in the period dramas Amazing Grace (2006), Atonement (2007), Tinker Tailor Soldier Spy (2011), 12 Years a Slave (2013), The Current War (2017), 1917 (2019) and The Courier (2020). He has also starred in numerous blockbuster films portraying Smaug and Sauron in The Hobbit film series (2012–2014), Khan in Star Trek Into Darkness (2013), and Dr. Stephen Strange in the Marvel Cinematic Universe, including in the films Doctor Strange (2016) and Doctor Strange in the Multiverse of Madness (2022).

== Early life and education ==
=== Birth, family and schooling ===
Benedict Timothy Carlton Cumberbatch was born on 19 July 1976 at Queen Charlotte's Hospital (now Queen Charlotte's and Chelsea Hospital) in the London district of Hammersmith, to actors Timothy Carlton and Wanda Ventham. He grew up in the borough of Kensington and Chelsea. He has a half-sister, Tracy Peacock, from his mother's first marriage.

Cumberbatch attended boarding schools from the age of eight, attending Brambletye, a prep school near East Grinstead, West Sussex. He undertook secondary schooling as an arts scholar at Harrow School. He was a member of the Rattigan Society, Harrow's principal club for the dramatic arts, which was named after Old Harrovian and playwright Sir Terence Rattigan. He was involved in numerous Shakespearean works at school and made his acting debut as Titania, Queen of the Fairies, in A Midsummer Night's Dream when he was 12. His first leading role was as Eliza Doolittle in Bernard Shaw's Pygmalion, in a production by the Head of Classics, James Morwood, who observed that Cumberbatch "acted everyone else off the stage". Cumberbatch's drama teacher, Martin Tyrell, called him "the best schoolboy actor" he had ever worked with. Despite his abilities, Cumberbatch's drama teacher at Harrow warned him against a career in acting, calling it a "tough business".

=== Tertiary education ===
After leaving Harrow, Cumberbatch took a gap year to volunteer as an English teacher at a Tibetan monastery in Darjeeling, India. He then attended the Victoria University of Manchester, where he studied drama. He continued his training as an actor at the London Academy of Music and Dramatic Art (LAMDA), graduating with an MA in classical acting. In January 2018, Cumberbatch succeeded Timothy West as president of LAMDA.

=== Antecedents and family tree ===
In 1728, Benedict Cumberbatch's 7th-great-grandfather, Abraham Cumberbatch of Saint Andrew, Barbados (died 1753), acquired properties on the island of Barbados in the West Indies, which used enslaved people for labour. St Nicholas Abbey was owned by Cumberbatch's ancestors for at least two hundred years.

These properties were passed down through the generations to Benedict's great-great-great-grandfather, Abraham Parry Cumberbatch (died 1840 in Hellingly, Sussex). He was an absentee landlord of two estates, Cleland and Lammings, for which he received £5388 as slave compensation (via the Slave Compensation Act 1837, four years after the Slavery Abolition Act 1833 had abolished slavery). The Cleland plantation enslaved 250 people, and was the main source of the Cumberbatch family's considerable wealth at the time; they were one of the richest families in Britain.

There has been media speculation that the Barbados National Task Force on Reparations, which, as part of the wider Caribbean's CARICOM Reparations Commission, is as of January 2023 seeking reparations from wealthy British MP Richard Drax for his ancestors' involvement in slavery, might also consider seeking reparations from families such as the Cumberbatches. Benedict Cumberbatch has said that by the time of his birth, most of the money had run out, and he grew up "definitely middle class", or upper middle class. Barbados′ officials have since rebuked those speculations and called them a "Campaign of deceptive and misleading British 'yellow journalism'", pointing out that they are solely involved in seeking reparations from governments and not individuals or families, with the sole exception of the Drax family, which still owns a large estate in Barbados - Richard Drax is said to be worth at least £150 million..

Abraham Parry Cumberbatch's son (Benedict's great-great-grandfather) Robert William Cumberbatch, was a British consul in the Ottoman and Russian Empires. His great-grandfather, Henry Alfred Cumberbatch, was also a diplomat who served as consul in Turkey and Lebanon, and his grandfather, Henry Carlton Cumberbatch, was a submarine officer of both World Wars, and a prominent figure of London high society.

Cumberbatch is third cousin 16 times removed of King Richard III, whom he portrayed in The Hollow Crown. He attended Richard III's 2015 reburial and read a poem.

== Career ==
=== 1998–2009: Theater work and early film roles ===
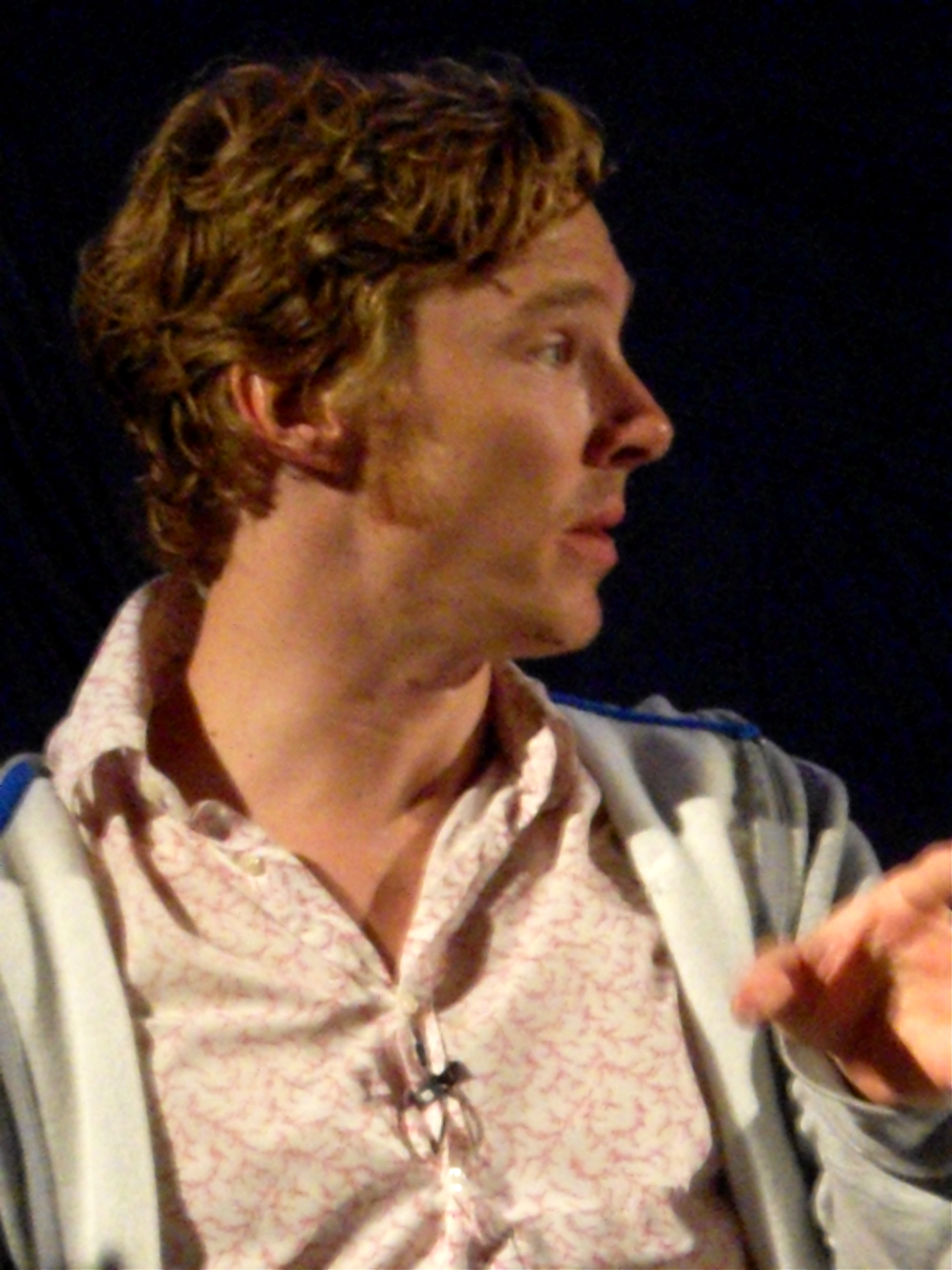
During rehearsals for Frankenstein, April 2011

Since 2001, Cumberbatch has had major roles in a dozen classic plays at the Regent's Park Open Air, Almeida, Royal Court and Royal National Theatres. He was nominated for an Olivier Award for Best Performance in a Supporting Role for his role as George Tesman in Hedda Gabler, which he performed at the Almeida Theatre on 16 March 2005 and at the Duke of York's Theatre when it transferred to the West End on 19 May 2005. This transfer marked his first West End appearance. Cumberbatch's early television roles include two separate guest roles in Heartbeat (2000, 2004), Freddy in Tipping the Velvet (2002), Edward Hand in Cambridge Spies (2003) and Rory in the ITV comedy drama series Fortysomething (2003). He also featured in Spooks and Silent Witness. In 2004, he landed his first main part in television as Stephen Hawking in Hawking. He was nominated for the BAFTA TV Award for Best Actor and won the Golden Nymph for Television Films – Best Performance by an Actor. He later provided Hawking's voice in the first episode of the television series Curiosity. He also appeared in the BBC miniseries Dunkirk as Lieutenant Jimmy Langley.

In 2005, Cumberbatch portrayed protagonist Edmund Talbot in the miniseries To the Ends of the Earth, based on Sir William Golding's trilogy; during filming he said he experienced a carjacking in South Africa, managing to escape. He made brief appearances in the comedy sketch show Broken News and the Channel 4 sitcom Nathan Barley in 2005 and featured alongside Tom Hardy in the television adaptation of Stuart: A Life Backwards, which aired on the BBC in September 2007. In 2008, Cumberbatch played the lead character in the BBC miniseries drama The Last Enemy, earning a Satellite Award nomination for Best Actor in a Miniseries or TV Film. In 2009, he appeared in Agatha Christie's Miss Marple: Murder Is Easy as Luke Fitzwilliam. He played Bernard in the TV adaptation of Small Island, earning him a nomination for BAFTA Television Award for Best Supporting Actor. Cumberbatch featured in Michael Dobbs' play, The Turning Point, which aired as one of a series of TV plays broadcast live on Sky Arts. The play depicted an October 1938 meeting between Soviet spy Guy Burgess, then a young man working for the BBC, and Winston Churchill. Cumberbatch portrayed Burgess; Churchill was played by Matthew Marsh, who had played a supporting role in Hawking. He narrated the 6-part series South Pacific (US title: Wild Pacific), which aired from May to June 2009 on BBC 2.

The 2006 film Starter for 10 has been credited with helping launch Cumberbatch's big-screen career. Also in 2006, Cumberbatch played late 18th/early 19th century British parliamentarian William Pitt the Younger in Amazing Grace, a role that garnered him a nomination for the London Film Critics Circle "British Breakthrough Acting Award". In Atonement (2007), Cumberbatch played what The Guardian called one of his "small parts in big films", and came to the attention of Sue Vertue and Steven Moffat, who would later cast him in Sherlock. In 2008, he had a supporting role in The Other Boleyn Girl, and the next year he appeared in the Charles Darwin biographical film Creation as Darwin's friend Joseph Hooker. Cumberbatch has repeatedly expressed his affection for radio and has done numerous productions for the BBC. Among his best-known radio work is the adaptation of John Mortimer's novel Rumpole and the Penge Bungalow Murders in 2009. He played Young Rumpole, and went on to play the part in nine more adaptations of Mortimer's works. Between 2008 and 2014, he played Captain Martin Crieff in BBC Radio 4's sitcom Cabin Pressure, alongside Stephanie Cole, John Finnemore, and Roger Allam.

=== 2010–2019: Breakthrough with Sherlock and Hollywood stardom ===
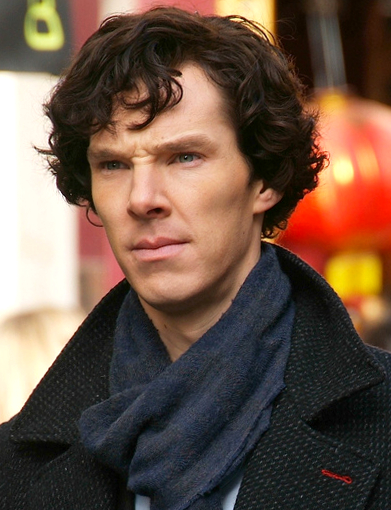
Filming Sherlock in Chinatown, London, March 2010

In June 2010, Cumberbatch led the revival of Sir Terence Rattigan's After the Dance directed by Thea Sharrock at the Royal National Theatre. He played 1920s aristocrat David Scott-Fowler to commercial and critical success. The play won four Olivier Awards including Best Revival. He acted in Danny Boyle's The Children's Monologues, a theatrical charity event at London's Old Vic Theatre on 14 November 2010 which was produced by Dramatic Need. In February 2011, Cumberbatch began playing, on alternate nights, both Victor Frankenstein and his creature, opposite Jonny Lee Miller, in Boyle's stage production of Mary Shelley's Frankenstein at the Royal National Theatre. Frankenstein was broadcast to cinemas as a part of National Theatre Live in March 2011. He achieved the "Triple Crown of London Theatre" in 2011 when he received the Olivier Award, Evening Standard Award and Critics' Circle Theatre Award for his performance in Frankenstein. In 2010, he appeared in The Whistleblower as well as Four Lions. He portrayed Peter Guillam, George Smiley's right-hand man, in the 2011 adaptation of the John le Carré novel Tinker Tailor Soldier Spy. The film was directed by Tomas Alfredson and featured Gary Oldman and Colin Firth. Cumberbatch played Major Jamie Stewart in Steven Spielberg's War Horse from DreamWorks Pictures in 2011.

In 2010, Cumberbatch portrayed Vincent van Gogh in Van Gogh: Painted with Words. The Daily Telegraph called his performance "[a] treat ... vividly bringing Van Gogh to impassioned, blue-eyed life". In the same year, Cumberbatch began playing Sherlock Holmes in the joint BBC/PBS television series Sherlock, to critical acclaim. The second series began on New Year's Day 2012 in the United Kingdom and was broadcast on PBS in the United States in May 2012. The third series aired on PBS over a period of three weeks in January to February 2014. Cumberbatch won an Emmy as Outstanding Lead Actor in a Miniseries or a Movie for the third episode of the third series of the show entitled His Last Vow. Cumberbatch has one of the most aggressive fanbases to date, part of the 'Big Three' fandoms on the social media site Tumblr, called SuperWhoLock. In April 2015, Cumberbatch was nominated for his sixth British Academy Television Award for Best Leading Actor for the third series of the Sherlock. In 2016, he was once again nominated for an Emmy as Outstanding Lead Actor in a Miniseries or a Movie, this time for Sherlock: The Abominable Bride.

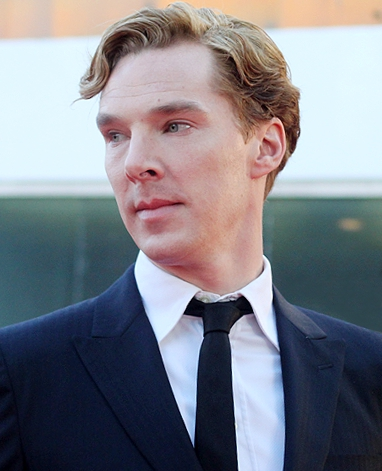
Cumberbatch at the premiere of Tinker Tailor Soldier Spy, September 2011

In 2012, he led the BBC and HBO co-produced miniseries Parade's End with Rebecca Hall. An adaptation of the tetralogy of novels of the same name by Ford Madox Ford, it was filmed as five episodes, directed by Susanna White and adapted by Sir Tom Stoppard. His performance earned Cumberbatch his second Emmy Award nomination for Best Actor in Miniseries or TV Movie. Cumberbatch was a part of a cast featuring members of the Royal National Theatre Company in 50 Years on Stage, the Royal National Theatre's landmark event for its 50th anniversary on 2 November 2013. He played Rosencrantz in a selected scene from Sir Tom Stoppard's play Rosencrantz and Guildenstern Are Dead. The show was directed by Sir Nicholas Hytner and was broadcast on BBC Two and in cinemas worldwide as a part of National Theatre Live. In February 2014, Cumberbatch appeared with Sesame Street characters Murray and Count von Count for PBS.

In 2012, Cumberbatch provided the voice and motion-capture for both Smaug the Dragon and the Necromancer in An Unexpected Journey, the first instalment of The Hobbit series based on the novel of the same name by J. R. R. Tolkien. He reprised his roles as Smaug and the Necromancer for The Desolation of Smaug (2013) and The Battle of the Five Armies (2014). For the motion-capture aspect of the films, he used a suit and facial markers to highlight the dragon's expressions and movements. Cumberbatch told Total Film "You just have to lose your shit on a carpeted floor, in a place that looks a little bit like a mundane government building. It was just me as well, with four static cameras and all the sensors." He then went on to play the Angel Islington in the 2013 BBC Radio 4 adaptation of Neil Gaiman's Neverwhere. In the same year, he led the BBC Radio 3 adaptation of Michael Frayn's play Copenhagen wherein he played theoretical physicist Werner Heisenberg. For the 70th anniversary of the Normandy landings, on 6 June 2014 Cumberbatch read the original BBC radio bulletins from June 1944 for BBC Radio 4.

Cumberbatch has narrated numerous documentaries for the National Geographic and Discovery channels. He has also read for several audiobooks, including Casanova, The Tempest, The Making of Music, Death in a White Tie, Artists in Crime, Tom and Viv, and Sherlock Holmes: The Rediscovered Railway Mysteries and Other Stories. He has done voice-overs for several commercials, including for major names Jaguar, Sony, Pimms, and Google+, performing the Seven Ages of Man monologue. For the 2012 London Olympics, he appeared in a short film on the history of London, which began the BBC coverage of the opening ceremony. He made appearances for two Cheltenham Festivals, in July 2012 for Music when he read World War I poetry and prose accompanied by piano pieces and in October 2012 for Literature when he discussed Sherlock and Parade's End at The Centaur. In 2012, he lent his voice to a four-part, spoken-word track titled "Flat of Angles" for Late Night Tales based on a story written by author and poet Simon Cleary, the final instalment of which was released on 9 May 2014. In 2012, he provided the voice of Dante Alighieri in the documentary Girlfriend in a Coma. In 2013, Cumberbatch narrated the documentary film Jerusalem about the ancient city. It was distributed by National Geographic Cinema Ventures in IMAX 3D theatres worldwide. The same year, he appeared as a special guest in a recording of Gordon Getty's opera Usher House, where he voiced the role of "the visitor", recorded and released by PENTATONE.

He narrated the documentary Cristiano Ronaldo: The World at His Feet about the Portuguese footballer for Vimeo and Vision Films in 2014. In August 2014, he recorded the first ever unabridged audiobook of William Golding's 1964 novel, The Spire, for Canongate Books. In 2013, Cumberbatch appeared in J. J. Abrams' sequel, Star Trek Into Darkness, as Khan, the film's antagonist. Three of the four films he featured in during the second half of 2013 premiered at the Toronto International Film Festival: The Fifth Estate, in which he played WikiLeaks founder Julian Assange, 12 Years a Slave, in which he played William Prince Ford, a slave owner, and August: Osage County, in which he played Charles Aiken. For the official soundtrack of the latter film, he recorded a song titled "Can't Keep it Inside". Cumberbatch had a voice role in DreamWorks Animation's feature film Penguins of Madagascar, which was released in November 2014. He then starred in the historical drama The Imitation Game as British cryptographer Alan Turing, also released in November 2014. The role earned him nominations for the Golden Globe, BAFTA, SAG, and Academy Award for Best Actor. In May 2014, he joined the cast of the film Black Mass opposite Johnny Depp which was distributed by Warner Bros. Pictures.

Cumberbatch returned to theatre to play Shakespeare's Hamlet at London's Barbican Theatre. The production was directed by Lyndsey Turner and produced by Sonia Friedman, which started its 12-week run in August 2015. The performance, co-starring Sian Brooke, was broadcast by the National Theatre Company by satellite internationally as Hamlet in Rehearsal. He earned his third Laurence Olivier Awards nomination for the role. In 2016, Cumberbatch portrayed Richard III in Shakespeare's play of the same name, as part of the second series of films for The Hollow Crown, which aired in both Britain and the United States. On 28 September 2016, Cumberbatch appeared on stage with Pink Floyd member David Gilmour during one of the musician's shows in London held at the Royal Albert Hall. He sang lead vocals on the song "Comfortably Numb", singing the verse sections originally sung by Roger Waters.

Cumberbatch starred as Doctor Strange in both the eponymous film released in November 2016, in Avengers: Infinity War in April 2018, Thor: Ragnarok in 2017, and in Avengers: Endgame in April 2019. Cumberbatch starred in Patrick Melrose, a miniseries adaptation of the Edward St Aubyn novels, which began airing on Showtime on 12 May 2018. In 2019 Cumberbatch appeared as British political strategist Dominic Cummings (who served as the campaign director of Vote Leave, the official campaign in favour of the UK leaving the European Union) in HBO and Channel 4's television film Brexit: The Uncivil War. In 2023 he was confirmed as executive producer and lead role in the miniseries Eric for streaming service Netflix. He starred as electricity titan Thomas Edison in the film The Current War in September 2017. In 2018, Cumberbatch voiced the title character in the Illumination animated film The Grinch, and provided the voice and did performance capture for the tiger Shere Khan in Mowgli: Legend of the Jungle, Netflix's film adaptation of Rudyard Kipling's The Jungle Book, starring alongside Christian Bale and Cate Blanchett. In 2019, he appeared briefly as British Colonel Mackenzie in Sam Mendes' World War I film 1917.

=== 2020–present: Established star and other roles ===
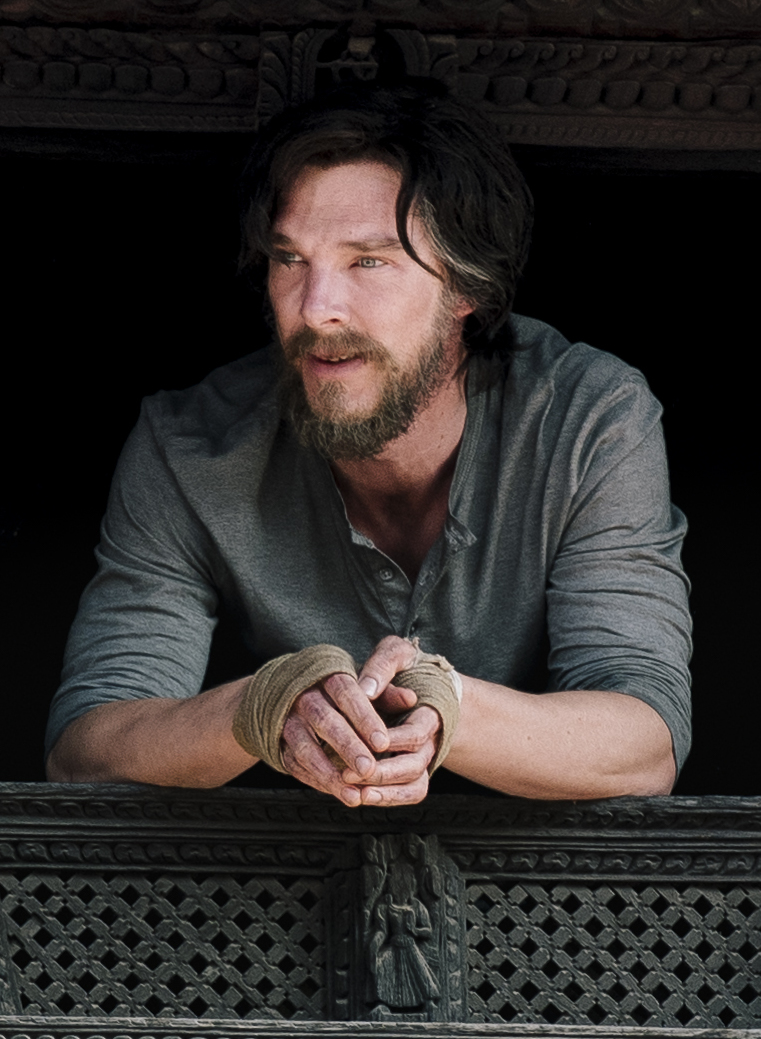
Cumberbatch in Kathmandu on the set of Doctor Strange, November 2015

His depiction of Strange also appeared in Spider-Man: No Way Home (2021) and in Doctor Strange in the Multiverse of Madness (2022). Cumberbatch is set to reprise his role as Doctor Strange in the upcoming Avengers: Doomsday (2026) and Avengers: Secret Wars (2027). In 2021, Cumberbatch starred in the drama The Power of the Dog, written and directed by Jane Campion. His performance in the film was acclaimed, and he received nominations for the Academy Award, British Academy Film Award, Screen Actors Guild Award, and Golden Globe Award for Best Actor. The same year Cumberbatch played Louis Wain, an eccentric English artist known for drawing anthropomorphised large-eyed cats, in The Electrical Life of Louis Wain.

Cumberbatch starred as the titular character in Wes Anderson's The Wonderful Story of Henry Sugar (2023), a short film adaptation of a short story by Roald Dahl, opposite Ralph Fiennes, Dev Patel and Ben Kingsley. Cumberbatch presents the 2026 feature documentary How to Live on Earth, which was released in UK cinemas from 26 June, and premiered on YouTube on 20 September 2026. The film is directed by Fredi Devas, who also co-produced with Jonnie Hughes. Cumberbatch calls the film "a call to action", and hopes that it acts as a model for people's interaction with Earth in the future. Peter Bradshaw gave the film 3 out of 5 stars, calling it "An antithesis of the doom and gloom docs about environmental destruction" that gives practical ways for how we can help to protect the planet. The film features, among others, Lead contributors include Mexican climate justice activist Xiye Bastida, field biologist and wildlife filmmaker Dan O'Neill; and American policy advisor and chef (formerly at the White House), Sam Kass. The film's end credit track is an original song written, produced, and performed by Imogen Heap.

== Impressionist ==
Adept at impersonating others, Cumberbatch was referred to as the "New King of Celebrity Impressionists" by Vulture magazine. He has imitated celebrities on a number of chat shows, such as The Graham Norton Show on the BBC, The Tonight Show Starring Jimmy Fallon on NBC, and in general interviews on channels such as MTV. His impersonations include Alan Rickman, Sean Connery, Jack Nicholson, Tom Hiddleston, Michael Caine, Christopher Walken, Tom Holland, Bane, John Malkovich, Matthew McConaughey, Taylor Swift and Chewbacca.

== Production company ==
Cumberbatch, Adam Ackland, writer-director Patrick Monroe, action coordinator Ben Dillon, and production manager Adam Selves launched a production company, SunnyMarch Ltd., in late 2013. Their first project under the company's banner was the £87,000 crowd-funded short film Little Favour, written and directed by Monroe with Cumberbatch in the lead role. The 30-minute action-thriller became internationally available on iTunes on 5 November 2013. In 2022 filming began on The End We Start From, an adaptation of the Megan Hunter novel of the same name, the rights to which the company had acquired in 2017.

== Other activities ==
=== Charity ===
Cumberbatch is an ambassador for The Prince's Trust. He is a supporter and patron of organisations focused on using the arts to help disadvantaged young people including Odd Arts, Anno's Africa and Dramatic Need. Since portraying Stephen Hawking in 2004, he has been an ambassador, and in 2015 patron, for the Motor Neurone Disease Association and in 2014 did the Ice Bucket Challenge for the organisation. He also set up a recovery fund for the benefit of Amyotrophic Lateral Sclerosis Association. Cumberbatch has donated artworks for charities and fundraisers including the Willow Foundation, and Thomas Coram Foundation for Children.

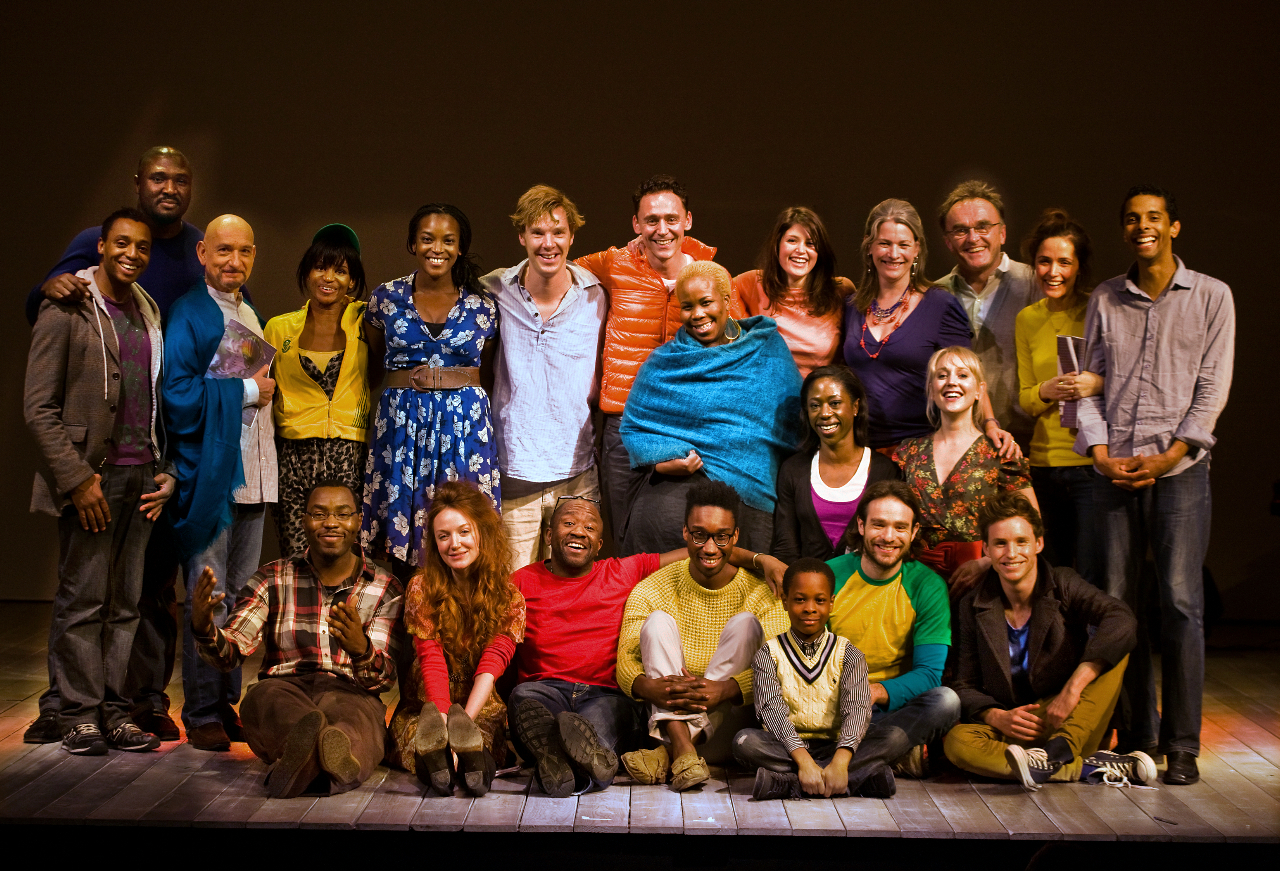
Cumberbatch (sixth from left, standing) and the cast of The Children's Monologues, at the Old Vic Theatre in London, November 2010

Together with Prince Philip, Cumberbatch presented 85 young people with the Duke of Edinburgh's Award at St James's Palace on 19 March 2014. "Our ambition is to extend this opportunity to hundreds of thousands across the UK", Cumberbatch said on behalf of the youth awards programme.

In May 2014, he joined Prince William and Ralph Lauren at Windsor Castle for a cancer awareness and fundraising gala for the benefit of the Royal Marsden NHS Foundation Trust. Cumberbatch stated, "Cancer isn't a disease that needs much awareness, but it does need continued funding for research." In September 2014, he participated in a video campaign for Stand Up To Cancer. Cumberbatch posed for photographer Jason Bell for an exhibition at Pall Mall, London from 16 to 20 September 2014 to mark 10 years of the "Give Up Clothes For Good" charity campaign, which has raised £17 million for Cancer Research UK. In 2014, Cumberbatch publicly backed "Hacked Off" and its campaign for UK press self-regulation by "safeguarding the press from political interference while also giving vital protection to the vulnerable."

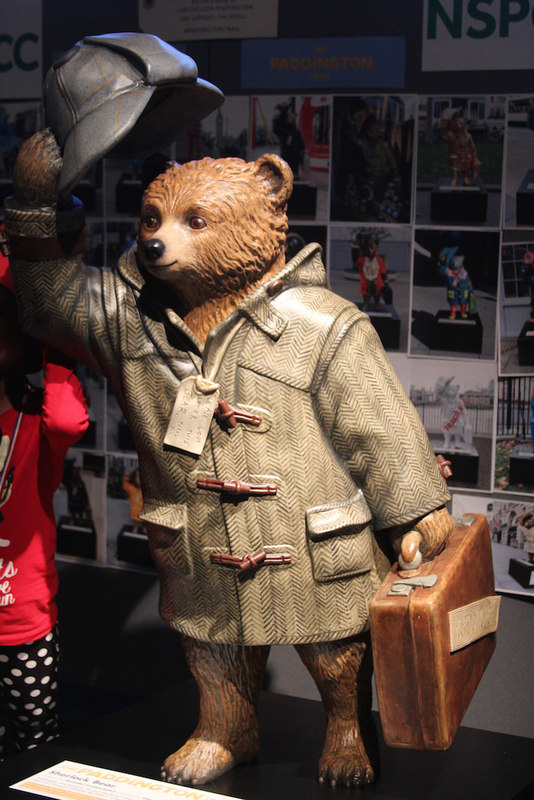
Cumberbatch's Sherlock Holmes-themed Paddington Bear statue in London, auctioned to raise funds for the NSPCC

In late 2014, Cumberbatch designed a Sherlock Holmes-themed Paddington Bear statue, one of fifty located around London prior to the release of the film Paddington, which was auctioned to raise funds for the National Society for the Prevention of Cruelty to Children (NSPCC).

In a November 2014 cover story for Out promoting The Imitation Game, Cumberbatch opened up about sexual experimentation during his time in boarding schools stating, "While there was experimentation, it had never occurred to me as, 'Oh, this is that!' It was just boys and their penises, the same way with girls and vaginas and boobs. It wasn't out of desire." LGBT group Stonewall released a statement praising Cumberbatch's comments, saying, "Seeing someone in the public eye – especially somebody as influential as Benedict – talking positively around gay issues, is powerful for young lesbian, gay and bisexual people. It is often difficult for those growing up to find role models who demonstrate that it is equally okay to be gay or straight."

Cumberbatch is a founding member of the "Save Soho" campaign which aims "to protect and nurture iconic music and performing arts venues in Soho." In an open letter published in The Guardian on 31 January 2015, Cumberbatch, among others, asked for pardons of all gay and bisexual men who were convicted under the same now-defunct "indecency" laws as Alan Turing was (whom Cumberbatch portrayed in The Imitation Game).

In September 2015, Cumberbatch condemned the UK government's response to the migrant crisis in a speech to theatregoers during a curtain call at a performance of Hamlet, in which he starred. He also fronted a video campaign to help the charity Save The Children in its mission to aid young Syrian refugees. He was one of the signatories of an open letter, published in The Guardian, criticising the government for its actions regarding the refugee problem. He also gave nightly speeches after his curtain call as Hamlet at the Barbican in London, asking for donations to help Syrian refugees. At the end of the run, the audience contributed more than £150,000 for Save the Children. He faced criticism for not taking in refugees himself, responding "I do have a house, but it's empty, it's gutted, there's no electricity or water, so that wouldn't work, and I have a baby in my flat, there are no spare rooms". In 2017 he told The Big Issue "I understand why some might think I should be housing people instead of complaining about a government not doing it. But I was trying to raise awareness that we can do more as a society [...] But we raised money for children in need. So I don't regret doing it for a second, and I will do it again, even if it does put me in the firing line".

In May 2020, Cumberbatch was among the ten celebrities who read an instalment of Roald Dahl's children's fantasy novel James and the Giant Peach. The audio-visual readings were published by Oscar-winning director Taika Waititi in aid of the global-non profit charity Partners In Health, co-founded by Dahl's daughter Ophelia, which had been fighting COVID-19 in vulnerable areas.

Cumberbatch appeared at the Together for Palestine benefit concert in September 2025, where he recited Mahmoud Darwish's poem On this land there are reasons to live.

=== Politics ===
In 2003, Cumberbatch joined the Stop the War Coalition protest in London against the Iraq War. He addressed activists in a 2010 protest sponsored by the Trades Union Congress in Westminster on the suggested risks to the arts due to spending cuts expected in the Spending Review. In 2013, he protested against what he perceived were civil liberties violations by the UK government.

Cumberbatch is a supporter of LGBTQ+ rights and in July 2013 officiated at the same-sex marriage of friends. Through this ordination he officiated the wedding of Robert Rinder, best known as Judge Rinder, and his partner Seth Cummings. For International Women's Day 2014, he was a signatory of Amnesty International's letter to the Prime Minister David Cameron for women's rights in Afghanistan. Cumberbatch identifies as a feminist.

In 2016, Cumberbatch was one of over 280 figures from the arts world who backed a vote for the United Kingdom to stay in the European Union with regard to the June 2016 referendum on that issue.

In May 2025, Cumberbatch joined over 300 public figures in an open letter calling for UK Prime Minister Keir Starmer to end the country's "complicity" in the "horrors" of the Gaza humanitarian crisis, and in September he took part in Together For Palestine, a four-hour benefit concert where he read a poem by the Palestinian writer Mahmoud Darwish. In December 2025 he was among over 200 leading cultural figures calling for the release of jailed Palestinian leader Marwan Barghouti.

In July 2026, Cumberbatch, Alan Cumming, and Benedict Wong co-authored a statement opposing the proposed Paramount-Warner Bros. merger, and encouraging Lisa Nandy, UK's Secretary of State for Digital, Culture, Media and Sport, to intervene in the takeover.

=== Endorsements ===
Cumberbatch has been a brand ambassador for Dunlop and Jaguar luxury cars since 2014, and became a global ambassador for Jaeger-LeCoultre in 2018. In 2024, he fronted a recycled nylon campaign for Prada alongside Emma Watson.

== Acting credits and accolades ==
Cumberbatch was appointed a CBE in the 2015 Birthday Honours for services to the performing arts and to charity. He received the honour from the Queen at an investiture ceremony at Buckingham Palace on 10 November 2015.

In February 2016, Cumberbatch was appointed visiting fellow at Lady Margaret Hall, Oxford University.

In 2025, Cumberbatch was honoured at the 58th Sitges Film Festival with the Time Machine Award (The Màquina del Temps).

== Public image and reputation ==
Cumberbatch achieved international recognition with the first series of Sherlock in 2010. He has since been called "The Thinking Woman's Crumpet" and has been a mainstay in numerous "Sexiest Man Alive" lists including those of Empire and People.

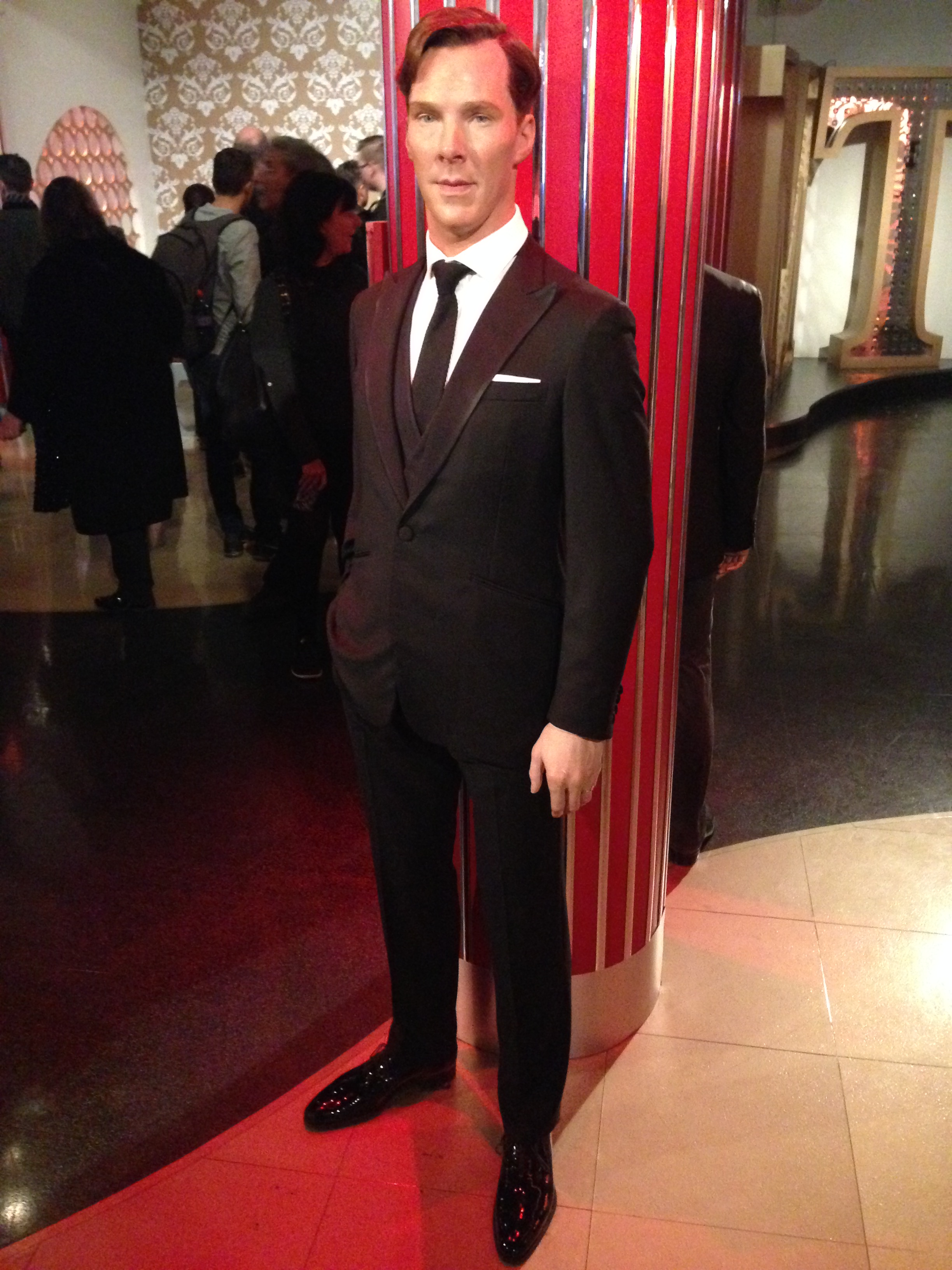
Waxwork of Cumberbatch at Madame Tussauds, London

Tatler listed Cumberbatch in the "Most Eligible Bachelors in the United Kingdom" in 2012. In the same year, Cumberbatch described a cyberstalking incident in which he discovered that someone had been live-tweeting his movements in his London home. Coming to terms with it, he said, it is "an ongoing process. To think that somebody knew everything I'd done in a day and told the rest of the world in real time!" His photograph taken at the Garrick Club by Derry Moore, 12th Earl of Drogheda was the cover of Moore's 2012 book An English Room.

In 2013, Cumberbatch was ranked fifth in the Tatler's "Most Fascinating People in Britain" list, higher than the Duchess of Cambridge and just below Queen Elizabeth II. Entertainment Weekly identified Cumberbatch as one of the "50 Coolest and Most Creative Entertainers" in Hollywood. He has also appeared on the covers of GQ, Time and The Hollywood Reporter's "New A-list" issue.

In 2014, Cumberbatch was included in The Sunday Times "100 Makers of the 21st Century", cited as this generation's Laurence Olivier." Film critic Roger Friedman stated that "Cumberbatch may be the closest thing to a real descendant of Sir Laurence Olivier." GQ identified him as one of the "100 Most Connected Men" in the UK in 2014. In the same year, Country Life magazine labelled him as one of its "Gentlemen of the Year".

In April 2014, Cumberbatch was regarded as a British cultural icon, with young adults from abroad naming him among a group of people whom they most associated with UK culture, which included William Shakespeare, Queen Elizabeth II, David Beckham, J. K. Rowling, The Beatles, Charlie Chaplin, Elton John, and Adele. The same month, Time magazine included him in its annual Time 100 as one of the Most Influential People in the World. Cumberbatch was the inspiration and focus of Abby Howells's play Benedict Cumberbatch Must Die which, despite its title, was a "love letter" and portrait of the fan obsession surrounding the actor. It premiered in June 2014 at BATS Theatre in New Zealand. The Tennessee Aquarium named one of its otters "Benny" in reference to Cumberbatch's first name after a naming contest on the zoo's website.

A wax figure of Cumberbatch has been on display at Madame Tussauds London since October 2014. In 2015, he was named one of GQ's 50 best dressed British men. In 2018, PETA declared Cumberbatch and director Ava DuVernay to be the Most Beautiful Vegan Celebs of 2018. (Cumberbatch later abandoned his vegan diet.)

== Personal life ==
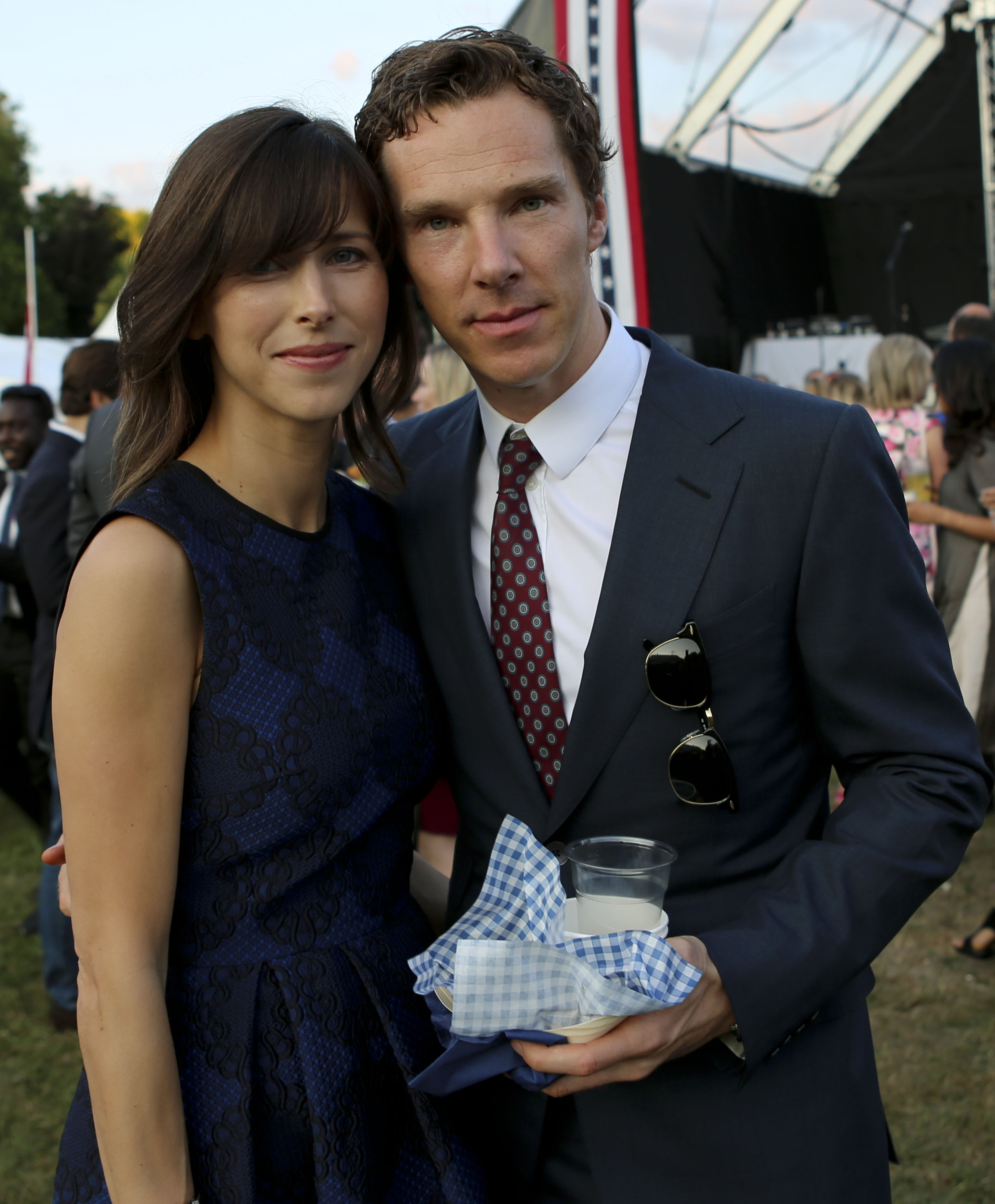
Cumberbatch with his wife Sophie Hunter, July 2015

While in KwaZulu-Natal, South Africa, in 2005, Cumberbatch and two friends (Theo and Denise Black) were abducted, after bursting a tyre, and held at gunpoint by a group of locals. Eventually their abductors drove them into unsettled territory and set them free without explanation. Cumberbatch said of the incident: "It taught me that you come into this world as you leave it, on your own. It's made me want to live a life less ordinary." Before the burst tyre, they had been listening to "How to Disappear Completely" by Radiohead. Following this experience, whenever Cumberbatch hears the song it "reminds [him] of a sense of reality ... [and] a reason for hope".

He subscribes to Buddhist philosophy and has expressed affinity for meditation and mindfulness.

Cumberbatch is known as an Arsenal supporter.

Cumberbatch was in a 12-year-long relationship with actress Olivia Poulet, from his time at Manchester University until 2010.

Cumberbatch is married to English theatre and opera director Sophie Hunter. Their engagement was announced in the "Forthcoming Marriages" section of The Times on 5 November 2014, after a 17-year friendship. On 14 February 2015, the couple married at the 12th-century St Peter and St Paul's Church in Mottistone on the Isle of Wight followed by a reception at Mottistone Manor. They have three sons. During the COVID-19 pandemic, Cumberbatch and his family lived in New Zealand, where Cumberbatch had been filming The Power of the Dog.

== See also ==
- List of British actors
- List of Academy Award winners and nominees from Great Britain
- List of actors with Academy Award nominations
- List of actors with more than one Academy Award nomination in the acting categories
- List of Primetime Emmy Award winners
