= Listed buildings in Antrobus =

Antrobus is a civil parish in Cheshire West and Chester, England. It is entirely rural, and contains 25 buildings that are recorded in the National Heritage List for England as designated listed buildings, all of which are listed at Grade II. This is the lowest of the three grades, and contains "buildings of national importance and special interest". Apart from St Mark's Church and the former and current Friends' Meeting Houses, all the buildings are houses or are related to farms.

== Buildings ==
Name and location	Photograph	Date	Notes
Crowley Grange; 53.3307°N 2.5036°W	—	Early 17th century (probable)	A timber-framed house on a low sandstone plinth, with crucks, casement windows, and clay tile roofs. The front wing dates from the 17th century, the rear wing, encased in brick, was added probably in the early 18th century, with another wing in the 20th century.
Crowley Green Cottage; 53.3349°N 2.5085°W	—	Early 17th century (probable)	A timber-framed cottage with a cruck and brick nogging. It has a tiled roof, and stands on a sandstone plinth. The cottage is in a single storey with attics. It was altered in the 19th century.
Galemoss Farmhouse; 53.3288°N 2.5126°W	—	Early 17th century (probable)	A timber-framed house with crucks, and steep tiled roofs. It is in a single storey with attics, and has later extensions in brick. Its windows are casements, plus two gabled dormers.
Greenfields Cottage (north); 53.3149°N 2.5367°W	—	Mid-17th century	A timber-framed cottage with brick nogging and a slate roof, standing on a sandstone plinth. It has one storey plus an attic. There is a rendered 20th-century extension at the rear. The windows are casements.
Broom Cottage; 53.2995°N 2.5543°W	—	Mid-17th century (probable)	This is a timber-framed cottage with crucks, largely re-cased in brick, with a slate roof. It is in one storey with an attic. There is a 19th-century extension. The windows are casements and dormers.
Farm building northwest of Crowley Green Cottage; 53.3351°N 2.5085°W	—	Mid-17th century (probable)	This started as a timber-framed building with a cruck, brick nogging, and slate roofs, and was later extended and rebuilt in brick in the 19th century. It encloses three sides of a farmyard. Features include a threshing porch, doors of varying types, loophole vents, casement windows, and dormers.
Barn, Crowley Lodge; 53.3235°N 2.5111°W	—	Mid-17th century (probable)	A timber-framed barn with a slate roof. It includes a threshing floor with doorless openings on each side.
Parkmoss Farmhouse; 53.3303°N 2.5187°W	—	Mid-17th century (probable)	This basically a timber-framed house with tiled roofs that was renovated and re-cased in brick in the later 19th century. It is in two storeys, and consists of two wings. The right wing contains a 19th-century gabled porch.
Farm building east of Parkmoss Farmhouse; 53.3302°N 2.5183°W	—	Mid-17th century (probable)	This is a brick building with a slate roof that originated as a shippon. It features include doors of differing sizes, loophole vents, and hopper windows.
Farm building north of Crowley Grange; 53.3309°N 2.5033°W	—	Late 17th century	This consists of a barn, stable and cartshed in brick with sandstone quoins and a stone-slate roof. The features include doors of various types, casement windows, and diamond-shaped vents.
Payne's Farmhouse; 53.3247°N 2.5381°W	—	Late 17th century (probable)	A rendered building with a slate roof in 1½ storeys with casement windows.
Crowley Lodge; 53.3226°N 2.5117°W		Early 18th century	A building in brick with slate roofs in two storeys plus attics. It has a five-bay front, the central bay projecting forwards and containing a doorway with a pediment. On each side is a single-storey wing with piers surmounted by urns. The windows are sashes.
Sandilands Farmhouse; 53.3386°N 2.5111°W	—	Early 18th century	A brick building on a sandstone plinth with slate roofs in two storeys plus attics. Alterations were made in the 19th century. The windows are casements.
Morris Farmhouse; 53.3066°N 2.5183°W	—	Early 18th century (probable)	A three-storey building in brick with a slate roof. The windows are sashes.
Former friends' Meeting House (Antrobus Pre-School Nursery); 53.3088°N 2.5475°W	—	1726	Built as a Friends' meeting house, altered in the 19th century, and later used as a Sunday school. It is constructed in brick with slate roofs. The building is in two storeys with an external staircase. Some of the windows are oval, and others are casements.
Farm building south of Parkmoss Farmhouse; 53.3301°N 2.5187°W	—	Mid-18th century (probable}	The brick building with its slate roof was altered in the 19th century. Its features include openings and archways of varying sizes, diamond-shaped vents, pitching holes, and casement windows.
North Lodge, Belmont Hall; 53.3012°N 2.5265°W	—	c. 1755	A symmetrical single-storey brick lodge with a slate roof. It has a projecting Tuscan sandstone porch with an entablature. On each side of the porch are sash windows.
Greenfields Cottage (south); 53.3148°N 2.5367°W	—	Early 19th century (or earlier)	A painted brick building with slate roofs, in a single storey plus attics. The windows are casements and dormers.
Sandiway Farmhouse; 53.3041°N 2.5528°W	—	c. 1820	A brick two-storey building on a stoneplinth with slate roofs. It has a Tuscan doorcase with an open pediment, and sash windows.
Grandsire's Green Farmhouse; 53.3115°N 2.5203°W	—	Early 19th century	A two-storey symmetrical brick house with a slate roof, it is set on a stone plinth and has rusticated quoins. The doorcase is in Tuscan style with a pediment, and the windows are sashes.
Lodge, Cogshall Hall; 53.2996°N 2.5499°W	—	c. 1830	A brick building with sandstone dressings and a slate roof in a single storey. It has a projecting Tuscan porch with a stone frieze and a pediment. In the left end is a canted bay window; the other windows are casements.
The Pole; 53.3040°N 2.5259°W	—	c. 1840	A stuccoed house with rusticated quoins, and a slate roof in two storeys plus an attic. It is a symmetrical building with three bays and a single-storey canted porch.
St Mark's Church; 53.3124°N 2.5349°W	—	1847–48	This is a Commissioners' church designed by George Gilbert Scott. It is a simple church, in Decorated style, with a bellcote surmounted by a weathercock on the ridge at the east end of the nave.
Pig styes, Sandilands Farm; 53.3385°N 2.5114°W	—	Late 19th century	A range of six pig styes in brick with slate roofs and individual frontage pens. At the right end is a single-storey feed mixing house.
Frandley Quaker Meeting House and wall 53.30891°N 2.54729°W		1880	The meeting house is in brick with sandstone dressings and a Welsh slate roof, and is in Gothic style. It has a rectangular plan, the doorway in the gable end has a four-centred arched head flanked by lancet windows, and there is a triple stepped lancet above. Along the sides are double and triple lancet windows and stepped buttresses. The burial ground is enclosed by a wall dating from the 17th century. This is in brick with red sandstone copings, and in the centre of the front is a gateway with a flat arch containing an iron gate.

== See also ==
- Listed buildings in Appleton
- Listed buildings in Aston by Budworth
- Listed buildings in Comberbach
- Listed buildings in Great Budworth
- Listed buildings in Stretton
- Listed buildings in Whitley
