= The End We Start From =

British film by Mahalia Belo

- Film poster
- Directed by: Mahalia Belo
- Written by: Alice Birch
- Based on: The End We Start From by Megan Hunter
- Produced by: Leah Clarke; Liza Marshall; Adam Ackland; Amy Jackson; Sophie Hunter
- Starring: Jodie Comer; Katherine Waterston; Benedict Cumberbatch; Mark Strong
- Cinematography: Suzie Lavelle
- Edited by: Arttu Salmi
- Music by: Anna Meredith
- Production companies: Anton; C2 Motion Picture Group; BBC Film; BFI; SunnyMarch; Hera Pictures
- Distributed by: Signature Entertainment
- Release dates: 10 September 2023 (TIFF); 19 January 2024
- Running time: 101 minutes
- Country: United Kingdom
- Language: English
- Budget: £9 million

The End We Start From is a 2023 British survival film starring Jodie Comer as a woman who, with her family, has to endure displacement when a widespread ecological disaster floods Great Britain. The film is directed by Mahalia Belo based on a screenplay by Alice Birch that adapts the 2017 novel The End We Start From by Megan Hunter. The film also stars Benedict Cumberbatch, Katherine Waterston and Mark Strong.

The End We Start From premiered at the Toronto International Film Festival on 10 September 2023. It was released in the United States on 8 December 2023, followed by release in the United Kingdom on 19 January 2024. The film received generally positive reviews from critics and was nominated in several categories at the 2023 British Independent Film Awards.

== Plot ==
Protracted storms and heavy rain cause low-lying parts of London to be flooded just as a woman goes into labour, giving birth to a baby son, Zeb. With incessant rain, the flooding spreads to other areas of Britain, triggering a country-wide crisis for food supplies and accommodations for displaced people.

The woman and her husband, R, flee with their baby to the home of R's parents, where they live comfortably until they begin to run out of supplies. R and his parents leave the woman and Zeb at the house to go get food from a distribution facility. While they are gone, the woman passes the time playing with Zeb. In the evening, a man and boy she does not know show up at the house and she fearfully serves them some food she has prepared; they then leave. R and his father return home, distraught at the death of R's mother, who was trampled by a mob. Shortly after, R's father, N, commits suicide, leaving R further traumatised.

After failing to obtain food at another distribution centre, the woman and R decide to go to a shelter, but R is unable to stay with his wife and Zeb, as the shelter will only take one caregiver per child. While staying in the shelter, the woman makes friends with O, another mother, who has a five-month-old girl. O tells her about a friend who lives in a commune on an island and talks about going there.

Sometime later, the shelter is attacked by raiders. The woman and O escape, and are taken some distance by two men in a car. After walking further, they come across a man, AB, who is alone and offers to share his food with them. He confirms O's story about the commune and says that he stayed there for some time before leaving, concerned that the people there wanted to forget how things used to be.

After AB departs, heading back to the city he came from, the woman and Zeb travel to the coast with O and her baby. They eventually reach a pier AB told them about, where a boat picks them up sometime later. While on a remote island, the woman finds the desire of the commune's residents to be shielded from the rest of the world too stifling and difficult to accept, and she also misses her husband. She decides to leave.

The woman says goodbye to O before returning to the mainland with Zeb. She makes her way toward London, stealing a car along the way. After abandoning the car, the woman, still with Zeb, boards a bus taking volunteers to do clean-up work in exchange for food and shelter. In London, she makes her way to the family house. As she begins cleaning up, with Zeb seated on the floor, R returns home. He slowly approaches her, while Zeb shakily stands up and starts walking.

== Cast ==
- Jodie Comer as Woman
- Joel Fry as R
- Yves Rassou as MW
- Ramanique Ahluwalia as DR
- Neil Bell as MWC
- Nina Sosanya as G
- Mark Strong as N
- Phillipa Peak as B
- Katherine Waterston as O
- Theo Barklem-Biggs as L
- Ansu Kabia as D
- Benedict Cumberbatch as AB
- Gina McKee as F
- Alexandria Riley as P

== Production ==
=== Development ===
Benedict Cumberbatch's company SunnyMarch with Hera Pictures acquired the rights in May 2017 to Megan Hunter's debut novel The End We Start From before the book had been published. Cumberbatch was quoted as saying it was "a stunning tale of motherhood [and] a striking and frighteningly real story of a family fighting for survival that will make everyone stop and think about what kind of planet we are leaving behind for our children". Cumberbatch was announced as a producer alongside Hera Pictures founder Liza Marshall, Adam Ackland, and Sophie Hunter.

In May 2022, it was announced that Mahalia Belo would direct an Alice Birch screenplay adaptation of the novel with Jodie Comer attached to appear as the central mother character. Production was listed as being completed by SunnyMarch through Leah Clarke and Ackland and Hera Pictures' Marshall alongside Amy Jackson and Hunter. With BBC Film and Anton adding finance, executive producers were Comer, Cumberbatch, Eva Yates, Cecile Gaget and Sébastien Raybaud. A budget of £9 million has been reported for the project. Also confirmed as working on the project were Suzie Lavelle as cinematographer, PC Williams as costume designer, production designer Laura Ellis-Cricks and hair and make-up designer Louise Coles. Director Belo described the film as a "unique and original take on a survival film. One that feels in tune with the climate crisis we are experiencing now."

=== Casting ===
In August 2022, it was revealed that Katherine Waterston had been added to the cast. In September 2022, it was confirmed that Cumberbatch and Mark Strong, Joel Fry, Gina McKee, and Nina Sosanya had been added to the cast and that principal photography had begun in London. Strong had been added as an executive producer along with Kate Maxwell, Fanny Soulier and Pieter Engels from Anton, and Claudia Yusef for BBC Film. C2 Motion Picture Group had been brought in for funding with Dave Caplan and Jason Cloth in as executive producers, with National Lottery funding coming via the BFI with Lizzie Francke acting as an executive producer.

=== Filming ===
As well as in London, principal photography was reported to have taken place at disused boarding school Carmel College in southern Oxfordshire.

=== Music ===
The score is by Anna Meredith.

== Release ==
In May 2023, Signature Entertainment and Republic Pictures acquired U.K. and U.S. distribution rights, respectively.

It was released in the United States on 8 December 2023, and in the United Kingdom on 19 January 2024.

== Reception ==
=== Critical response ===
On the review aggregator website Rotten Tomatoes, 89% of 80 critics' reviews are positive, with an average rating of 6.9/10. The website's consensus reads: "Led by Jodie Comer's gripping performance in the central role, The End We Start From offers a thoughtful, haunting look at the end of the world." Metacritic, which uses a weighted average, assigned the film a score of 65 out of 100, based on 25 critics, indicating "generally favorable" reviews.

=== Accolades ===
The End We Start From received nine nominations for the 2023 British Independent Film Awards, including Best Lead Performance for Jodie Comer, and Best Supporting Performance for Katherine Waterston, as well as Best Cinematography for Suzie Lavelle and Best Costume Design for PC Williams.
