= Cogshall Hall =

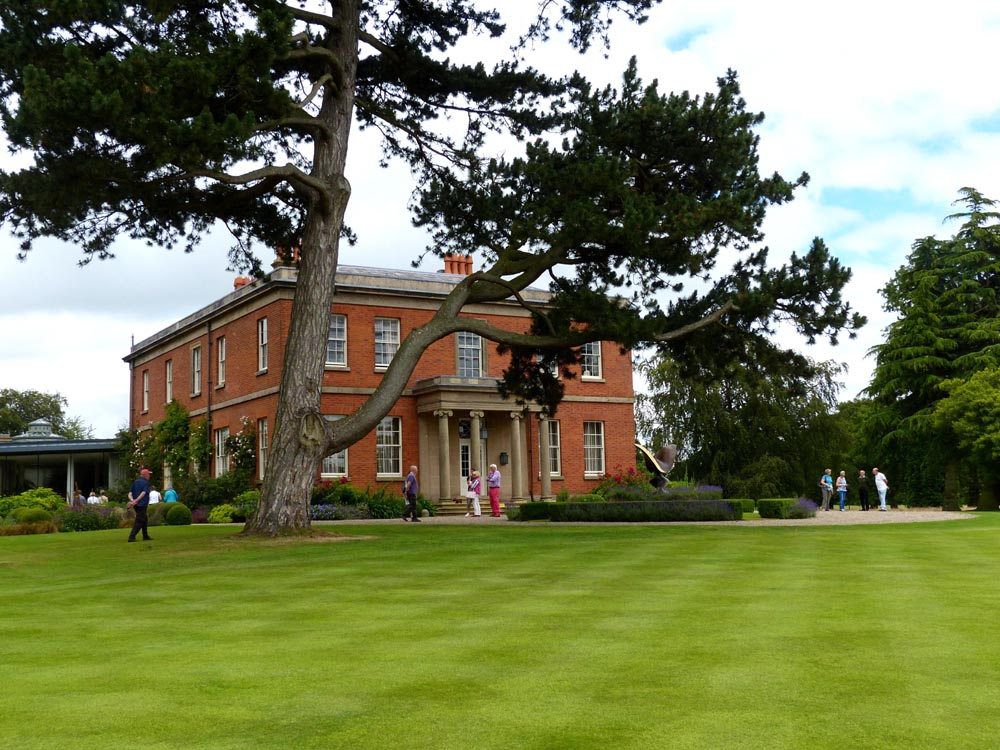
- Interactive map of the Cogshall Hall area

General information
- Type: country house
- Architectural style: Georgian
- Location: near Comberbach, Cheshire, England
- Coordinates: 53.29721°N 2.55368°W
- Completed: c. 1830

Design and construction
- Designations: Grade II* listed building

Cogshall Hall is a country house near the village of Comberbach, Cheshire, England. It was built in about 1830 for Peter Jackson. A kitchen wing was added to the rear during the early 20th century. It is constructed in red-brown brick, and has a slate hipped roof. It is rectangular in plan, and has two storeys. Its architectural style is Georgian. The entrance front has five bays and an Ionic portico. There is a similar, smaller portico on the right side. The house is recorded in the National Heritage List for England as a designated Grade II* listed building. The lodge to the hall was built at about the same time. It has a Tuscan porch with a pediment, and is listed at Grade II. The architectural historian Nikolaus Pevsner refers to the lodge as being "ambitious".

In July 2019, both the main estate house and the former lodge, the Grange, were listed for sale as part of the 99-acre property. The Hall, of Flemish-bond brick with a slate roof, was described in Cheshire Country Houses in the early 1900s as "a house of note". As photographs in a news report indicate, much of the interior has been modernized recently and the gardens have been restored.

== See also ==
- Grade II* listed buildings in Cheshire West and Chester
- Listed buildings in Comberbach
