= Listed buildings in Barnton, Cheshire =

Barnton is a village and a civil parish in Cheshire West and Chester, England. It contains 11 buildings that are recorded in the National Heritage List for England as designated listed buildings, all of which are at Grade II. This grade is the lowest of the three gradings given to listed buildings and is applied to "buildings of national importance and special interest". Running through the parish are the Trent and Mersey Canal, which passes through two tunnels, and the River Weaver together with the Weaver Navigation. The majority of the listed buildings in the parish are associated with these transport links. Associated with the canal are four tunnel entrances, an airshaft, two mileposts, and a terrace of cottages. The Weaver Navigation contains Saltersford Locks, and its toll house. The other listed building is the village church, Christ Church.

Name and location	Photograph	Date	Notes
Eastern entrance to the Barnton Tunnel; 53.26849°N 2.54854°W		1777	The entrance arch for a tunnel on the Trent and Mersey Canal designed by James Brindley. It is constructed in blue brick with red sandstone dressings. At the sides of the arch are stone pilasters, and at the centre of the bridge is a stone plaque inscribed with the name of the tunnel.
Western entrance to the Barnton Tunnel; 53.26938°N 2.55627°W		1777	The entrance arch for a tunnel on the Trent and Mersey Canal designed by James Brindley. It is constructed in blue brick with red sandstone dressings. At the sides of the arch are stone and brick pilasters.
Eastern entrance to the Saltersford Tunnel; 53.27310°N 2.55902°W		1777	The entrance arch for a tunnel on the Trent and Mersey Canal designed by James Brindley. It is constructed in blue brick with red sandstone dressings, and carries a stone plaque with the tunnel's name. It was restored and re-opened in 1984; the opening is recorded on a steel plaque.
Western entrance to the Saltersford Tunnel; 53.27402°N 2.56406°W		1777	The entrance arch for a tunnel on the Trent and Mersey Canal designed by James Brindley. It is constructed in blue brick with red sandstone dressings. At the sides of the arch are stone pilasters. It was restored and re-opened in 1984.
Airshaft above the Barnton Tunnel; 53.26906°N 2.55341°W		Late 18th century (probable)	A circular brick structure surmounted by a metal plate, providing ventilation for the Trent and Mersey Canal. It is approximately 1.5 metres (4.9 ft) in diameter, and 3.5 metres (11.5 ft) high.
Milepost above the Saltersford Tunnel; 53.27373°N 2.56273°W		1819	In cast iron, this consists of a tapering column with a domed cap. It carries the maker's name and the date on a quatrefoil plaque, and the distances from Preston Brook and Shardlow on a curving plate at the top.
Milepost behind houses on Runcorn Road; 53.26825°N 2.54551°W	—	1819	In cast iron, this consists of a circular post with a moulded head. It carries the maker's name and the date on the shaft, and the distances from Preston Brook and Shardlow on a convex tablets at the top.
Christ Church; 53.2689°N 2.5459°W		1841–42	The church was probably designed by Edmund Sharpe for the Weaver Navigation Trustees. The chancel was added in 1900. It has an eight-bay nave and chancel in one range, and a double bellcote. The elaborate pulpit was originally in St Helen's Church, Northwich.
34–42 Runcorn Road; 53.2682°N 2.5454°W	—	Mid 19th century	A terrace of cottages for workers on the Trent and Mersey Canal, built in brick with slate roofs. Between numbers 34 and 36 is a passage with a semicircular entrance. Number 42 is set back from the other cottages. All the windows are sashes, and the doors have fanlights.
Saltersford Locks; 53.2718°N 2.5623°W		1874	A pair of locks, one wide, one narrow, for the Weaver Navigation. They are constructed in bands of sandstone and limestone, and have wooden gates and cast iron furniture. The locks include a pair of semaphore signals at each end, bollards, and Pelton turbines.
Tollhouse, Saltersford Locks; 53.27192°N 2.56161°W		Late 19th century	A toll house for the Weaver Navigation. It is constructed in brick with a slate roof, and has a brick chimney. The building contains just one room.

== See also ==
- Listed buildings in Anderton with Marbury
- Listed buildings in Comberbach
- Listed buildings in Little Leigh
- Listed buildings in Northwich
- Listed buildings in Weaverham
