= St Mark's Church, Antrobus =

Coordinates: 53.3124°N 2.5349°W

- Location in Cheshire
- OS grid reference: SJ 645 796
- Location: Knutsford Road, Antrobus, Cheshire
- Country: England
- Denomination: Anglican
- Website: St Mark, Antrobus

History
- Status: Parish church
- Dedication: Saint Mark

Architecture
- Functional status: Active
- Heritage designation: Grade II
- Designated: 27 August 1986
- Architect: George Gilbert Scott
- Architectural type: Church
- Style: Gothic Revival
- Groundbreaking: 1847
- Completed: 1848
- Construction cost: £1,550

Specifications
- Materials: Sandstone, slate roof

Administration
- Province: York
- Diocese: Chester
- Archdeaconry: Chester
- Deanery: Great Budworth
- Parish: St Mark, Antrobus

Clergy
- Vicar: Revd Alec Brown

St Mark's Church is in Knutsford Road in the village of Antrobus, Cheshire, England. It is an active Anglican parish church in the deanery of Great Budworth, the archdeaconry of Chester, and the diocese of Chester. Its incumbent is shared with St Mary and All Saints Church, Great Budworth. The church is recorded in the National Heritage List for England as a designated Grade II listed building. It was a Commissioners' church, having received a grant towards its construction from the Church Building Commission.

== History ==
St Mark's was designed by George Gilbert Scott, and built between 1847 and 1848 at a cost of £1,550 (equivalent to £160,000 in 2025). A grant of £80 was given towards its construction by the Church Building Commission.

== Architecture ==
The church is constructed in red sandstone, with a slate roof. The architectural style is Decorated. Its plan consists of a nave, a south porch, a chancel, and a north vestry. On the ridge of the church is a bellcote surmounted by a weathervane. Along the sides of the church are two two-light windows and a lancet window. The east window has three lights, and the west window has two lights. A broad buttress on the south side of the church contains a priest's door. The porch is in timber. Inside the church is a screen designed by Scott, part of which is in wood and part in iron. There is stained glass in windows in the chancel and the south wall of the nave.

== External features ==
The churchyard contains the war grave of a First World War soldier of the Cheshire Regiment.

== See also ==
- Listed buildings in Antrobus
- List of new churches by George Gilbert Scott in Northern England
- List of Commissioners' churches in Northeast and Northwest England
