= Antrobus, Cheshire =

Village in Cheshire, England

Coordinates: 53.312°N 2.536°W

Antrobus
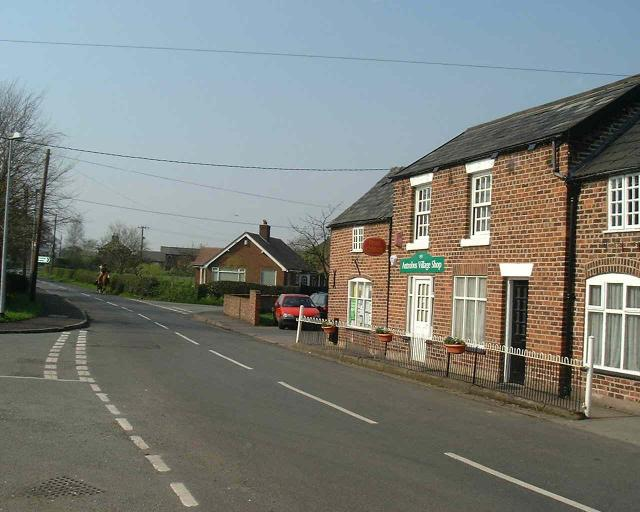
- The centre of Antrobus village

- Location within Cheshire
- OS grid reference: SJ643796
- Civil parish: Antrobus
- Unitary authority: Cheshire West and Chester
- Ceremonial county: Cheshire
- Region: North West
- Country: England
- Sovereign state: United Kingdom
- Post town: NORTHWICH
- Postcode district: CW9
- Dialling code: 01606
- Police: Cheshire
- Fire: Cheshire
- Ambulance: North West
- UK Parliament: Tatton

Antrobus is a civil parish and village in Cheshire, England, about 7 miles (11 km) south of Warrington. It lies within the unitary authority of Cheshire West and Chester, and had a population of 832, reducing to 791 at the 2011 Census, and to 767 in the 2021 census. The parish is the most northeasterly point of Cheshire West and Chester, and as such borders both Warrington and Cheshire East. As well as Antrobus village centre itself, the parish includes other large hamlets at Frandley, about 1 mi (1.6 km) south-west from the main village, and Crowley, about 2 mi (3.2 km) to the north-east.

The village shop and post office is owned and run cooperatively by the villagers for the benefit of the community having previously closed in 2003.

== Toponymy ==
The place name is recorded in the Domesday Book of 1086 as Entrebus, and in the Pipe Rolls of Cheshire of 1282 as Anterbus. The derivation of the name is from the Old Norse personal name Eindrithi or Andrithi, with the Old Norse buski ("shrub, bush or thicket"), the whole name thus signifying "Andrithi's thicket".

An alternative derivation relates to the Domesday Book being written by Norman administrators in their Norman French dialect, in which the name 'Entrebus' means 'between the woods', similar to 'entre bois' in modern French. As the area now known as Cheshire was largely forest as the time, this name would describe the situation of the hamlet at the time.

== History ==
Antrobus is listed as a township of Great Budworth parish on Cheshire's tithe map, in the Bucklow Hundred and under the deanery of Frodsham. In 1894, Antrobus became a parish in its own right and a part of the Runcorn Rural District. In 1936, the neighbouring parishes of Crowley and Seven Oaks were abolished and brought under the control of Antrobus. Through the 20th century, usage of the term Seven Oaks to describe the south-west of Antrobus declined, and much of that area is now known as Frandley. Seven Oaks has become truncated to Sevenoaks and now refers to the small hamlet surrounding the former Sevenoaks Saddlery and sawmill at the northernmost end of Gibb Hill.

The north-easternmost area of the parish was formerly taken up by a portion of the Arley estate, including all of the village of Arley itself, Crowley Hall Lodge and the surrounding farms. However, when Runcorn Rural District was abolished in 1974, Antrobus was moved into Vale Royal and neighbouring Aston by Budworth (within which the rest of the Arley estate was contained) was transferred into the borough of Macclesfield. This made the Antrobus portion the only remaining part of the estate not under Macclesfield's control. In 1978, for the ease of estate management and the paying of tax, Aston-by-Budworth Parish Council requested that the portion of Antrobus east of Arley Brook, Lodge Lane, and Caldwell's Gate Lane be transferred to their control.

The village was struck by an F1/T3 tornado on 23 November 1981, as part of the record-breaking nationwide tornado outbreak on that day.

== Culture ==
=== Soul Cakers ===
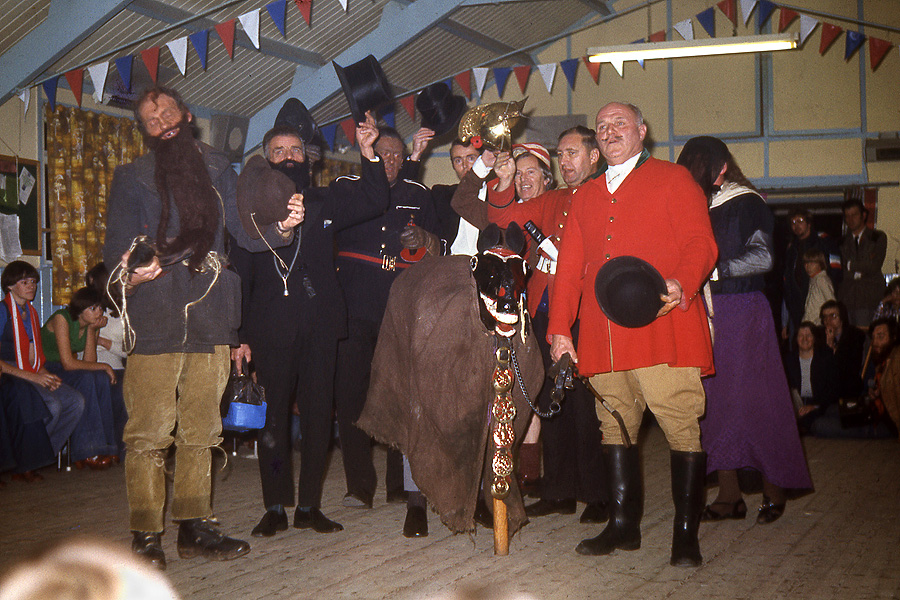
Antrobus Soul Cakers (Cheshire)

Antrobus is known for its Soul Cakers, who travel around the county performing a soul caking play annually between All Souls Night (31 October) and 12 November. Based at their 'home pub', the Antrobus Arms, the Antrobus Soul Cakers have the longest unbroken run of soul caking performances in the world.

== Religion ==
=== Anglicanism ===
Antrobus' Anglican St Mark's Church is located in the village centre. It was designed by George Gilbert Scott and built in 1848. It is a Grade II listed building.

=== Quakerism ===
Local tradition has it that in the 18th century an oak tree in Seven Oaks was where George Fox preached to over 2,000 people. On this site, besides the oak tree, now stands the Frandley Quaker Meeting House one of only a small number of such meeting houses in Cheshire. The first meeting house was built in 1726 and still stands today, but a larger replacement meeting house was built in 1880. The first meeting house now houses the Antrobus Pre-School Nursery.

=== Methodism ===
Antrobus' most modern church is a Methodist chapel in the hamlet of Grandsire's Green. The chapel was opened in 1936 and sits at the junction of Brow Lane and Barber's Lane. It forms a part of the Sankey Valley Methodist circuit.

== See also ==
- Listed buildings in Antrobus
