= Cristiano Ronaldo: The World at His Feet =

Spanish film made in 2014

- Film poster
- Directed by: Tara Pirnia
- Based on: Cristiano Ronaldo
- Starring: Cristiano Ronaldo; Benedict Cumberbatch
- Production companies: Future Sight Entertainment; Stax Entertainment; Motion Forces (post-production)
- Distributed by: Antonello Novellino; Vision Films
- Release dates: 1 June 2014 (United States); 21 April 2016
- Country: Spain
- Languages: English; Portuguese; Spanish

Cristiano Ronaldo: The World at His Feet is a 2014 Spanish documentary film directed by Tara Pirnia. It follows the life and career of Portuguese footballer Cristiano Ronaldo, who was playing for Spanish club Real Madrid at the time of the documentary's release. It was released via Vimeo in June 2014.

The documentary is narrated by the actor Benedict Cumberbatch.

== See also ==
- Ronaldo (film)
