= Listed buildings in Comberbach =

Comberbach is a civil parish in Cheshire West and Chester, England. Apart from the village of Comberbach, the parish is entirely rural, and contains six buildings that are recorded in the National Heritage List for England as designated listed buildings. The buildings are all domestic or related to farming.

== Key ==
Grade	Criteria
Grade II*	Particularly important buildings of more than special interest.
Grade II	Buildings of national importance and special interest.

== Buildings ==
Name and location	Photograph	Date	Notes	Grade
Kidbrook; 53.2932°N 2.5290°W	—	Mid-17th century (probable)	A timber-framed cottage, which is mainly rendered, with a thatched roof. It is in one storey with attics. The windows are replaced casements and thatched eyebrow dormers.	II
Comberbach; 53.2937°N 2.5309°W	—	Late 17th century (probable)	A timber-framed cottage with brick nogging and a tiled roof. It was extended in the 19th century. The cottage has two bays, and is in one storey plus attics.	II
Ivy Lodge; 53.2930°N 2.5308°W	—	c. 1800	A house in late Georgian style. It is constructed in brick with a slate roof. The roof is hipped and has two ridges. The house is in two storey and has sash windows.	II
Cogshall Hall; 53.2972°N 2.5537°W		c. 1830	A country house in Georgian style to which a rear wing was added in the 20th century. It is constructed in brick with a slate hipped roof. The entrance front has five bays and an Ionic portico and there is a similar, smaller portico on the right side.	II*
Cogshall Grange; 53.2978°N 2.5535°W	—	c. 1830	These were originally the stables for Cogshall Hall, and included accommodation for the stable staff and a coach house; they have since been converted into residences. The main block is a two-storey building in brick with slate roofs. The central bay projects forwards and is pedimented. On its roof is a cupola carried on seven Tuscan columns and one wooden post. Features in the outbuildings include arched entrances, doorways, pitching eyes, and diamond-shaped vents.	II
Avenue Farm; 53.2962°N 2.5294°W	—	c. 1834	The farm was built as part of a model estate, and was extended in about 1865. It is constructed in brick, with decorative brick features and bargeboards. The roof is slated. It has a linear plan, with a service wing at the rear. The windows are sashes.	II

== See also ==
- Listed buildings in Anderton with Marbury
- Listed buildings in Antrobus
- Listed buildings in Barnton
- Listed buildings in Great Budworth
- Listed buildings in Little Leigh
- Listed buildings in Whitley
