= Jason Bell (photographer) =

English photographer

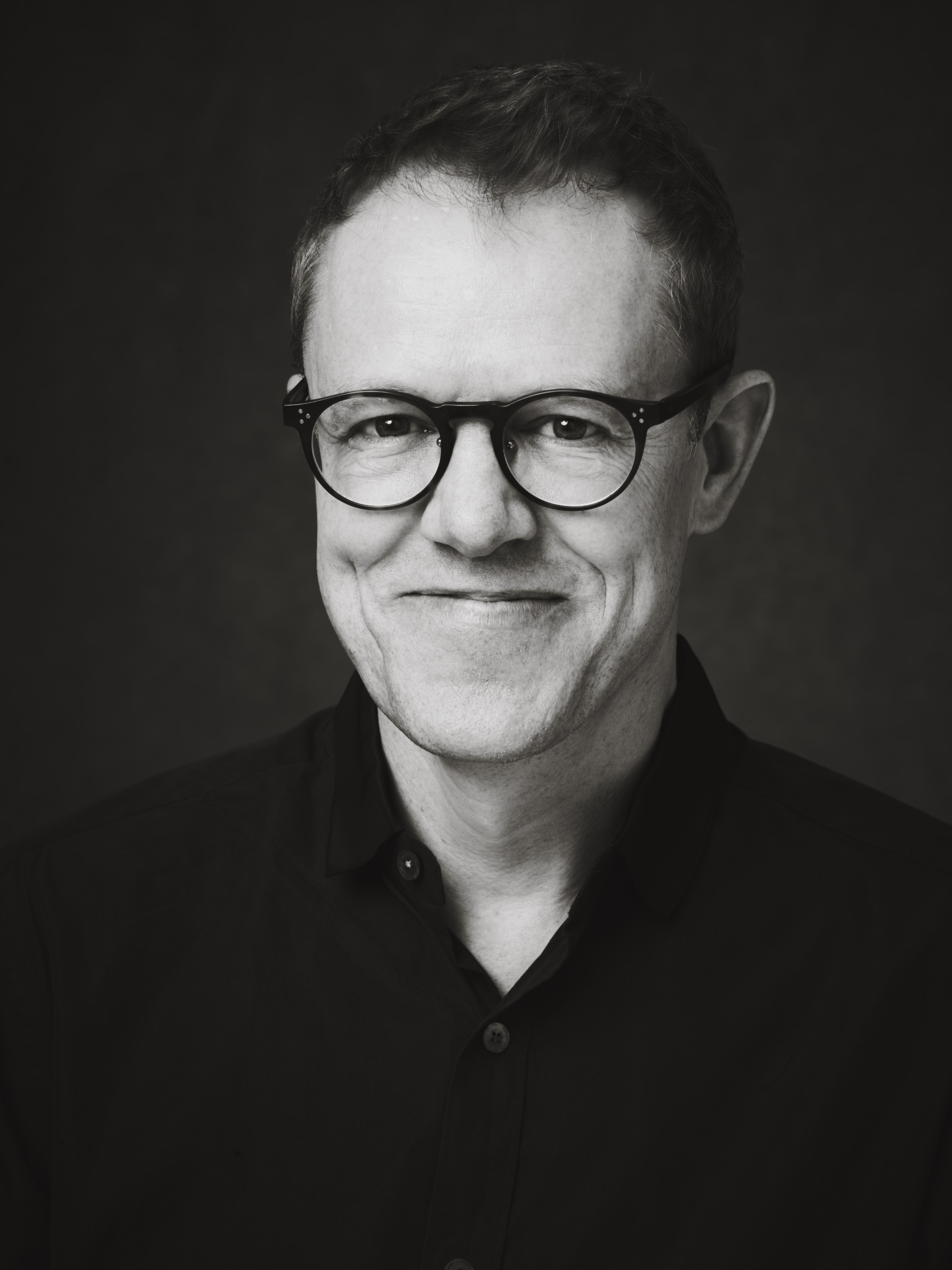
- Bell in 2018
- Born: 19 April 1969 (age 57); London, England
- Education: Oxford University
- Known for: Photography; Portrait photographer
- Website: jasonbellphoto.com

Jason Bell (born 19 April 1969 in Camden Town, London) is an English portrait and fashion photographer. He studied politics, philosophy and economics at Oxford University before returning to London to work for the Sunday Times. He lives in both New York and London. He describes photography as 'always part of who I was' and he sees himself as a portrait photographer rather than a fashion photographer, saying: 'for me the most important thing is the person'.

Bell has shot for Vanity Fair, British and American Vogue, GQ, Interview, Harper's Bazaar, Time and Newsweek amongst others. He has photographed many celebrities such as Angelina Jolie, Leonardo DiCaprio, Timothee Chalamet, Lashana Lynch, Benedict Cumberbatch, Eddie Redmayne, Adam Driver, John Boyega, Ian McKellen, Katy Perry and Judi Dench. Many of his photographs are in the National Portrait Gallery permanent collection.

In February 2003, the British edition of GQ published photographs by Bell on its cover and inside the magazine of Kate Winslet which the magazine retouched, dramatically slimming her waist and legs; Winslet issued a statement saying that the alterations were made without her consent; Bell also denied having made the alterations. GQ issued an apology in the subsequent issue.

In 2010 the National Portrait Gallery in London held an Exhibition of Jason's portraits for the release of his book An Englishman in New York. Inspired by some 120,000 English men and women living in New York City. Bell identified and photographed leading British born figures setting the cultural agenda in the city including Thomas P. Campbell, director of the Metropolitan Museum of Art at the time, Simon Schama, Sting and Zoe Heller. Jason began this project following a commission on “Anglophilia” for American Vogue.

On 23 October 2013, Bell was commissioned by Clarence House to take the official christening photographs of Prince George. It was the first time 4 generations of Royal Family have been shot together since 1899.

In March 2015 Bell shot US Vanity Fair's annual Hollywood Portfolio, the first time a British photographer has shot the entire portfolio. The 30 page portfolio featuring 44 celebrities and was also accompanied by 3 short films directed by Bell.

He has also worked on many film and entertainment posters such as Dune ft. Timothée Chalamet and Zendaya, Shondaland's Bridgerton and Marvel's Dr Strange. Past projects include The Revenant, The Danish Girl, Bridget Jones's Diary, Love Actually and the Netflix series The Crown.

== Philanthropy ==
Since 2004 Bell has been shooting Cancer Research's Give Up Clothes for Good Campaign, which funds pioneering research to fight Childhood Cancers. The campaign has raised over £44 million to date.

== Awards ==
- 2011 - Honorary Fellowship of the Royal Photographic Society

== Books published ==
- 2010 An Englishman in New York (ISBN 978-1-904587-97-2)
- 2004 GiveGet (ISBN 0-954684-31-1)
- 2002 Hats Off (ISBN 1-899235-49-3)
- 2000 Gold Rush (ISBN 1-899235-33-7)
