= Christ Church, Barnton =

Coordinates: 53.2689°N 2.5459°W

- Christ Church, Barnton, from the southeast

- Location in Cheshire
- OS grid reference: SJ 637,748
- Location: Barnton, Cheshire
- Country: England
- Denomination: Anglican
- Website: Christ Church, Barnton

History
- Status: Parish church
- Founded: 25 October 1841
- Consecrated: 7 October 1842

Architecture
- Functional status: Active
- Heritage designation: Grade II
- Designated: 18 July 1986
- Architect: Edmund Sharpe (attributed)
- Architectural type: Church
- Style: Gothic Revival
- Construction cost: £1,400 (£137,000 in 2025)

Specifications
- Materials: Sandstone and brick Slate roofs

Administration
- Diocese: Diocese of Chester
- Archdeaconry: Chester archdeaconry
- Deanery: Great Budworth
- Parish: Christ Church, Barnton

Clergy
- Vicar: Deborah Dalby

Christ Church is in the village of Barnton, Cheshire, England. It is an active Anglican parish church in the deanery of Great Budworth, the archdeaconry of Chester, and the diocese of Chester. The church is recorded in the National Heritage List for England as a designated Grade II listed building.

== History ==
Christ Church was built in 1841–42. The foundation stone was laid on 25 October 1841, and the church was consecrated on 7 October 1842 by John Sumner, Bishop of Chester. The land for the church cost £30 (equivalent to £2,900 in 2025), and the church itself cost £1,400 (equivalent to £137,000 in 2025). The cost of the land was met by Richard Greenall, vicar of St Matthew's Church, Stretton, Archdeacon of Chester, and a member of the Greenall's family, brewers in Warrington. The church website states that the architect was Edmund Sharpe of Lancaster. There is no other documentary evidence that Sharpe was the architect, but owing to the stylistic similarity of the design to his other works at about the same time it has been attributed to him.

A considerable restoration was undertaken in 1888, which included covering the internal brick walls with cement rendering. In 1899 the church was extended at the east end by enlarging the nave and the chancel, and installing a new east window. A new organ chamber was built on the south side of the church, and the vicar's vestry on the north side was demolished. The extension was consecrated on 19 September 1900 by Francis Jayne, Bishop of Chester. A small extension was added to the church in 1974.

== Architecture ==
The church is constructed in Runcorn red sandstone, and its interior is lined with red brick. It has a Welsh slate roof. The plan consists of an eight-bay nave and chancel in one range, a south porch, and a south chapel containing the organ. At the west end is a double bellcote. The bays along the sides of the nave are divided by buttresses, and each bay contains a lancet window. There are triple lancet windows at the east and west ends of the church.

Inside the church is a gallery at the west end carried on cast iron columns. The reredos contains Gothic arcading and a carving of the Last Supper. The Bath stone pulpit had been made in 1842 for St Helen Witton Church, Northwich, and was moved to Christ Church in 1888, having been bought for £10 (equivalent to £1,100 in 2025). The authors of the Buildings of England series describe the pulpit as being "Puginesquely elaborate". The two-manual organ was built in 1913 by Wadsworth and Brother, and may contain pipework from an earlier organ.

== See also ==
- Listed buildings in Barnton, Cheshire
- List of architectural works by Edmund Sharpe
