= SuperWhoLock =

Fanon crossover

SuperWhoLock is a fan-made crossover of the television series Supernatural, Doctor Who, and Sherlock. SuperWhoLock differs from most other fan work in that there is no explicit canon, as references between the shows are minimal. Instead, connections between the three shows are entirely created by fans. Fan activities include fan fiction, fan art, and cosplay. SuperWhoLock is known for "GIF fics", "short narratives constructed from animated GIFs that tell a story utilizing characters from all three series (and sometimes more).

The fandom originated in the early 2010s on the social media site Tumblr, among predominantly young, female, LGBTQ fans. Paul Booth, a media scholar, reports that the earliest SuperWhoLock work he found (a GIF fic) was dated December 30, 2011, though the term had been coined before then. The crossover may have gained popularity from a fake trailer for SuperWhoLock made by a fan in April 2012. It "dominated Tumblr" until the mid-2010s, before abruptly declining in popularity.

Sherlock and Doctor Who were both shows from the UK and shared writers (Steven Moffat and Mark Gatiss), while Supernatural and Doctor Who were both sci-fi/fantasy shows; all three had large Tumblr fandoms in 2012. Booth quotes a fan who believed that the crossover grew popular in part "because of the similar dynamics of the shows ... In all three shows the characters solve problems and crimes, be [they] supernatural or not, so it's easy for the fans to think of a plot that could include characters from all these shows." Each subset of the three-way crossover (e.g. Supernatural and Doctor Who) also had their own fans, and some fans began watching other shows from the trio after being introduced to SuperWhoLock through one of the other shows. Fan engagement with SuperWhoLock often focuses on the characters from the three shows and their reactions and possible relations with one another. A fan analyzes SuperWhoLock as "the combination not of the three texts, but of the three fandoms", and many fans identify primarily with the individual fandoms rather than the SuperWhoLock label.

In 2014, a joke article published on April 1st announced a (fake) official crossover of the three shows.
