= Jane Cumberbatch =

British interior designer and author

Jane Cumberbatch is a British interior designer and author, based in London. She is the originator of the decorating philosophy "Pure Style," which emphasizes simplicity, thrift, and longevity. Her designs emphasize a simplified aesthetic which includes white walls, muted colors, natural textures, and vintage elements. She is the author of seven books, including Pure Style and the cookbook Recipes for Every Day.

== Career ==
Cumberbatch worked as decorating editor for the magazine British House and Garden, as well as for Elle Decoration, and the Sunday Telegraph Magazine. Cumberbatch's London house has been featured on the BBC Series Lead Balloon. Cumberbatch's interior design style has been used by many furniture brands, such as Habitat, Marks & Spencer, and Laura Ashley.

In 2015 she wrote the book Pure Style, published by Pavilion. In 2016 she published a companion book, Pure Colour.
