= Barnton, Cheshire =

Civil parish and village in the northwest of England

Coordinates: 53.266667°N 2.55°W

Barnton
- Village and civil parish
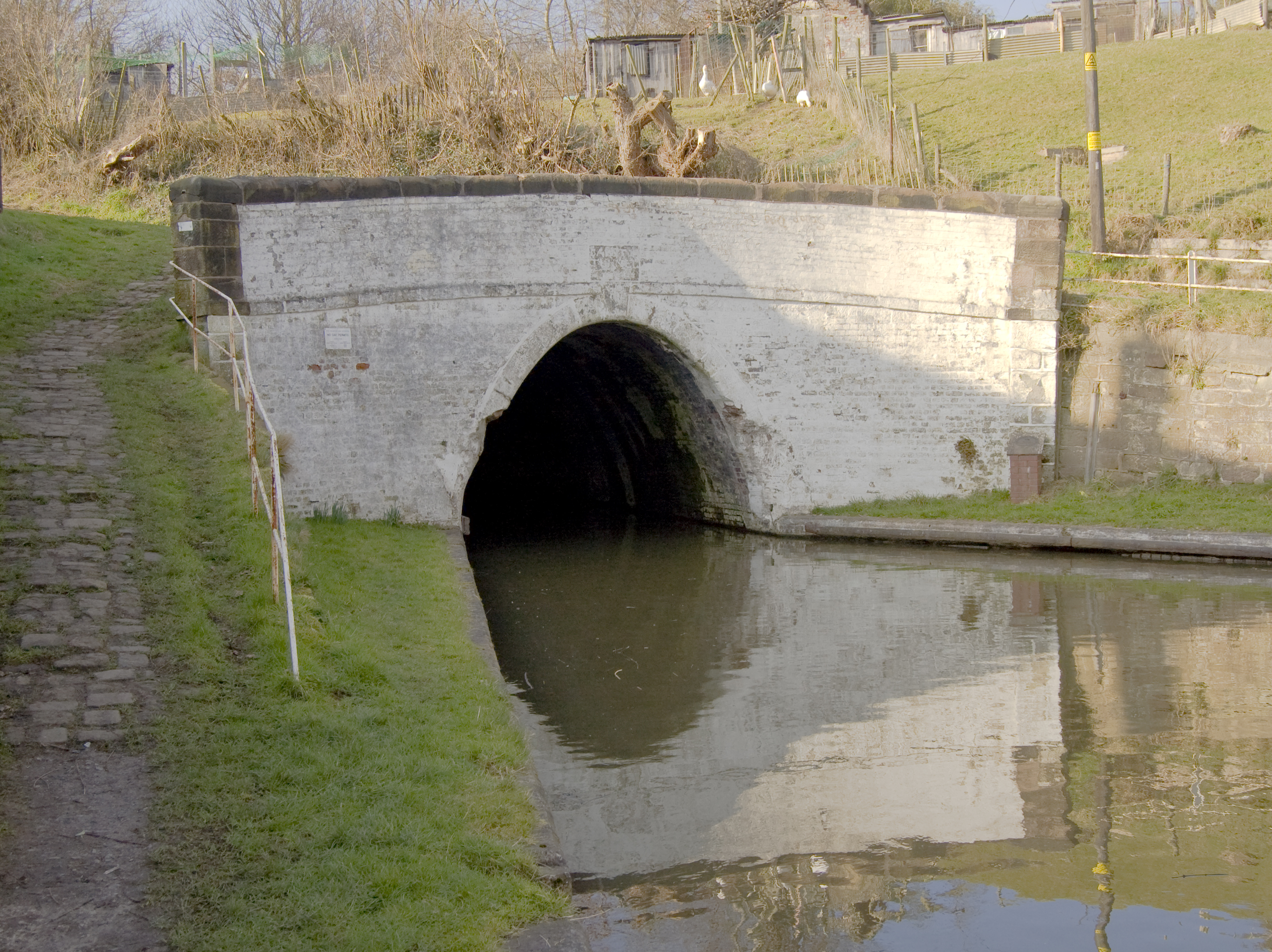
- Barnton Tunnel

- Location within Cheshire
- Population: 5,700 (2021)
- OS grid reference: SJ633745
  - London: 183 miles (295 km)
- Civil parish: Barnton
- Unitary authority: Cheshire West and Chester
- Ceremonial county: Cheshire
- Region: North West
- Country: England
- Sovereign state: United Kingdom
- Post town: NORTHWICH
- Postcode district: CW8
- Dialling code: 01606
- Police: Cheshire
- Fire: Cheshire
- Ambulance: North West
- UK Parliament: Tatton
- Website: barnton-pc.gov.uk

Barnton is a civil parish and village, just outside the town of Northwich, in the unitary authority of Cheshire West and Chester and the ceremonial county of Cheshire, England. It lies north and east of the Trent & Mersey Canal which goes through two tunnels (Barnton and Saltersford) to the west of the village.

The village can roughly be divided into four parts: the old village which grew northeastwards from the southwest corner; the more up-market properties northwestwards along and to the west of the main Runcorn Road (A533); the council-built estate to the north west, largely between Townfield Lane and Runcorn Road; and the more modern estates (the largest known as the Locke estate after the builders) to the north and east. The village has no easily identifiable centre with some shops along the Runcorn Road and others by the new Health Centre in Lydyett Lane.

There is currently only one pub, a small number for such a large village and greatly fewer than there were 100 years ago. The parish church is Christ Church in Church Road in the old part of the village; there are also Catholic, Methodist and Pentecostal churches.

Barnton F.C. were founder members of the Mid Cheshire Football League and now compete in the North-West counties league division one south. The new village hall (the Memorial Hall) is located next to the Barnton F.C. ground off Townfield Lane. The village also has a cricket club which is located close to Barnton School which is also on Townfield Lane.

Below the village where the main A533 crosses the River Weaver, on 19 August 1659, at the Battle of Winnington Bridge, a Parliamentary army of 5,000 men under the command of General John Lambert defeated a rebel Royalist army of 4,000 men under the command of Sir George Booth. A plaque marking this was erected on the bridge in August 2009 by the Northwich & District Heritage Society, 350 years after the battle commenced.

The Parish Church, Christ Church, Barnton was completed in 1842 and the Vicarage stands proudly on Church Road overlooking the Winnington Village housing estate. Further along at Church Road junction stands the old Police Station, which was built in 1902 for the sergeant who lived on Bells Brow. It contained an office, an interview room and three cells. There is still has a row of back-to-back houses on Bell's Brow at the top of Barnton Hill built in 1810 to accommodate Brunner Mond labourers.

Barnton became known as "Jam Town" in the late 1800s due to so many people owning and not renting their homes. "People in Barnton eat Jam butties so that they can own not only their own houses, but buy their neighbours too!". In December 2018, a wooden carving of a young boy eating a jam sandwich was unveiled in honour of the sacrifices for home ownership in the village. The statue was named the 'Jam Butty Boy', and is located on the A533 (Runcorn Road) that runs through the village.

== See also ==
- Listed buildings in Barnton, Cheshire
