= Phaedra (cantata) =

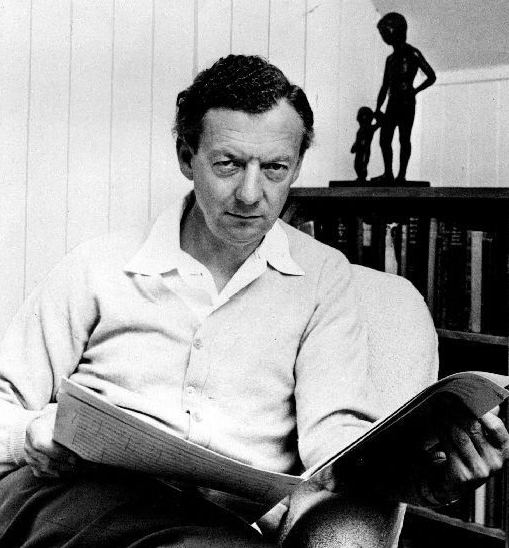
Benjamin Britten in 1968

Phaedra, Op. 93, is a cantata for mezzo-soprano and small orchestra by Benjamin Britten, written for Janet Baker.

== History ==
Phaedra was the composer's last vocal work, written in 1975 and first performed by Dame Janet Baker at the Aldeburgh Festival on 16 June 1976. Britten assembled the libretto from parts of a translation of Racine's Phèdre by Robert Lowell. Stylistically, it draws from the Baroque cantata tradition and features the harpsichord, for which there are some noteworthy passages.
