= Robert William Cumberbatch =

British diplomat

- Born: 1821; Tunbridge Wells, Kent, England
- Died: 1876 (aged 54–55); İzmir, Ottoman Empire
- Resting place: British Cemetery at Smyrna
- Occupation: Diplomat
- Years active: 1845–1876
- Spouses: Ellen Lloyd (m. 1843) Louisa Grace Hanson (m. 1853)
- Children: 10, including Henry Alfred Cumberbatch
- Relatives: Henry Carlton Cumberbatch (grandson); Timothy Carlton (great-grandson); Benedict Cumberbatch (great-great-grandson)

Robert William Cumberbatch (1821–1876) was a British diplomat who held the post of Consul in the Russian and Ottoman Empires.

== Life and career ==
Cumberbatch was born in Tunbridge Wells, Kent, the son of Abraham Parry Cumberbatch (1784–1840), a wealthy slave owner in Barbados, and his second wife, Caroline Chaloner (1788–1840).

He first went to Istanbul in June 1845 to serve as secretary to his half-brother Abraham Carleton Cumberbatch, who had been promoted from Vice Consul to Consul General there on 3 May 1845. Cumberbatch served as Acting Second Consul from May 1855 to June 1856, then as third Vice Consul until September 1857. He was appointed Consul at Berdiansk on the Sea of Azov (now Ukraine, but then part of the Russian Empire) on 12 January 1858. On 25 April 1864 he was appointed Consul at Smyrna (now İzmir, Turkey), remaining in his post until his death. Being in the diplomatic service in Smyrna, Cumberbatch enthusiastically struggled with slave trade. He was buried at the British Cemetery at Smyrna on 30 March 1876. Despite the disapproval of his superiors in the foreign service, he repeatedly attempted to draw attention to the slave trade in the Mediterranean in order to create pressure to ban it.

=== Personal life ===
Cumberbatch was married twice. In 1843 he married Ellen Lloyd in Winkfield, Berkshire, and in 1853 he married Louisa Grace Hanson in Constantinople. Cumberbatch and Hanson had ten children:

- William Ernest Cumberbatch (1854–1855).
- Robert Carlton Cumberbatch (1855–1868).
- Constance Louisa Cumberbatch (1857–1922), married Sir Adam Samuel James Block (1856–1920).
- Henry Alfred Cumberbatch (1858–1918), Consul at Smyrna from 1896 to 1908.
- Arthur Herbert Cumberbatch (1860–1921), married Marian Dermina Tristram (1862–1917).
- Edith Catherine Cumberbatch (1863–1867).
- George Charles Cumberbatch (1865–1866).
- Gertrude Evelyn Cumberbatch (1866–1924), married Albert Charles Wratislaw, the son of Albert Henry Wratislaw.
- Alice Maud Cumberbatch (1868–1869).
- Cyril James Cumberbatch (1873–1944).

Through Henry Alfred Cumberbatch, his grandson was Commander Henry Carlton Cumberbatch RN, his great-grandson is actor Timothy Carlton, and his great-great-grandson is the actor Benedict Cumberbatch.
