= Comberbach =

Village in Cheshire, England

Coordinates: 53.291°N 2.534°W

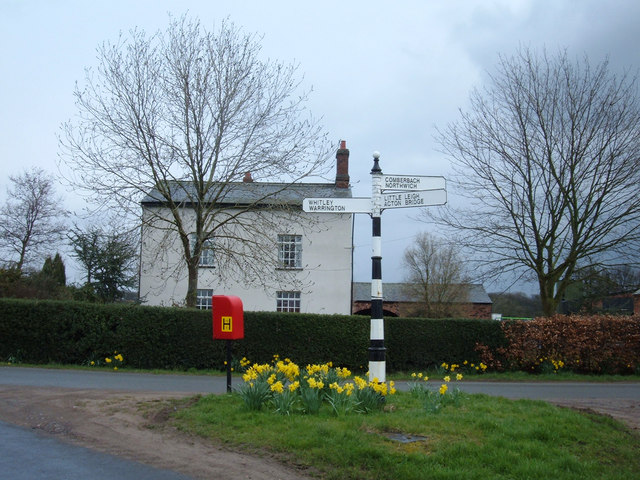
- Senna Green, Comberbach

- Location within Cheshire
- OS grid reference: SJ644773
- Civil parish: Comberbach
- Unitary authority: Cheshire West and Chester
- Ceremonial county: Cheshire
- Region: North West
- Country: England
- Sovereign state: United Kingdom
- Post town: NORTHWICH
- Postcode district: CW9
- Dialling code: 01606
- Police: Cheshire
- Fire: Cheshire
- Ambulance: North West
- UK Parliament: Tatton

Comberbach /ˈkɒmbəˌbætʃ/, deriving from the late Britonnic, or early Welsh for a "small confluence" is a civil parish and small village in the unitary authority of Cheshire West and Chester and the ceremonial county of Cheshire, England, between Northwich and Warrington. The population of the civil parish taken at the 2011 census was 953. The village has a new memorial hall (partly Lottery Funded), a bowling club, one pub - the Spinner and Bergamot, (the Drum and Monkey closed in 2013) - and a post office/village shop. There is a county primary school, a Methodist chapel and an old-fashioned red phone box. Older residents and those who have lived in the village for a long time pronounce the name 'comma-batch', the first 'b' being silent.

Cartoonist John Geering, the artist behind Bananaman, lived here.

Comberbach Mummers perform the traditional Soulcaking Play (a form of mummers play), from 31 October for two weeks. It restarted in the mid-1980s. The mummers meet most Thursday evenings in The Spinner and Bergamot pub.

== See also ==
- Listed buildings in Comberbach
- Cumberbatch, an English surname
