= Timothy Carlton =

English actor (born 1939)

- Born: Timothy Carlton Congdon Cumberbatch; 4 October 1939 (age 87); Oxford, England
- Education: Sherborne School
- Occupation: Actor
- Spouse: Wanda Ventham (m. 1976)
- Children: Benedict Cumberbatch
- Parent(s): Henry Carlton Cumberbatch; Pauline Congdon
- Relatives: Sophie Hunter (daughter-in-law)
- Family: Henry Arnold Cumberbatch (grandfather); Robert William Cumberbatch (great-grandfather)

Timothy Carlton Congdon Cumberbatch (born 4 October 1939) is an English actor.

== Early years ==
Carlton was born in Oxford, England, the son of Pauline Ellen Laing (née Congdon), who died on 11 October 2007, and Henry Carlton Cumberbatch, a decorated naval officer of both World Wars and a prominent figure of London high society. His grandfather, Henry Arnold Cumberbatch CMG, was the Consul General of Queen Victoria in Turkey.

== Career ==
Carlton has had a long and distinguished career in both the theatre (Her Royal Highness..? etc.) and in television, appearing in numerous BBC television series over the years since 1966 to the present day, including Cold Comfort Farm (1968), the sitcoms Executive Stress, Keeping Up Appearances, Next of Kin and in the television films Gauguin the Savage (1980) and The Scarlet Pimpernel (1982). In 2015 he played Donald Sidwell in “Napoleon’s Violin”, S1:E8 of The Coroner. His film career has included roles in Baby Love (1969), The Breaking of Bumbo (1970), That Lucky Touch (1975), The Bitch (1979), High Road to China (1983) and Parting Shots (1999).

== Personal life ==
Carlton is married to actress Wanda Ventham, whom he met in 1970 while filming sequences for the drama series A Family at War and they have been married since April 1976. They appeared together in Series 2 of BBC drama The Lotus Eaters in 1973 and Series 3 and 4 of BBC series Sherlock in 2014 as the parents of the title character, played by their son, actor Benedict Cumberbatch.
