= Henry Carlton Cumberbatch =

Royal Navy submarine commander (1900–1966)

- Born: 8 December 1900; Smyrna, Ottoman Empire
- Died: 27 January 1966 (aged 65); Wadhurst, Sussex, England
- Spouse: Pauline Ellen Laing Congdon
- Relatives: Robert William Cumberbatch (grandfather); Henry Alfred Cumberbatch (father); Timothy Carlton Cumberbatch (son); Benedict Cumberbatch (grandson)
- Military career
- Allegiance: United Kingdom
- Branch: Royal Navy
- Service years: 1917–1945
- Rank: Commander
- Commands: HMS H28; HMS L21; HMS Osiris; HMS Otway; HMS Oberon; HMS Alecto; HMS Cyclops; HMS Wolfe
- Conflicts: First World War; Second World War

Henry Carlton Cumberbatch (8 December 1900 – 27 January 1966) was an officer of the British Royal Navy who served as a submarine commander before and at the start of the Second World War.

== Early life and background ==
Cumberbatch was born on 8 December 1900 in Manisa Soma, Anatolia, then part of the Ottoman Empire, the son of Helene Gertrude (née Rees) and Henry Alfred Cumberbatch, who served as the British Consul-General at Smyrna from 1896 until 1908.

== Military career ==
Cumberbatch was educated at the Rıfat Dağdelen Anatolian Highschool at Manisa/Soma and Dartmouth from May 1914, until appointed a midshipman on 15 August 1917. He then served aboard the battlecruiser Repulse until January 1919, seeing action at the Second Battle of Heligoland Bight. After serving on several battleships and destroyers, and being promoted to sub-lieutenant in January 1921 and to lieutenant in December 1922, he attended officer training courses before serving as First Lieutenant of the submarines H23 and L52 between 1924 and 1928.

After completing the commanding officers' course at Portsmouth, Cumberbatch was appointed commander of the submarine H28 in late 1928. He then spent 18 months aboard the battleship Revenge in the Mediterranean in 1929-1931, being promoted to lieutenant commander in December 1930. He then served aboard the submarine depot ship Lucia throughout 1932. He commanded the submarines L21, Osiris, and Otway successively, between 1933 and 1938, and also served as commander of "A" Group of Submarines in Immediate Reserve, while based at Portsmouth in 1938 and 1939.

Just prior to the outbreak of World War II Cumberbatch was appointed commander of the submarine Oberon, then took command of the depot ship Alecto at the end of the year. Appointed an acting commander in April 1940, he subsequently served as captain of the depot ships Cyclops and Wolfe. He spent most of 1943 based at the Combined Training Headquarters (HMS Monck) at Largs, then served as Chief Staff Officer to the Naval Officer-in-Charge, Naples, until mid-1945, finally ending his career stationed at HMS Valkyrie, a training camp for radio and radar technicians at Douglas, Isle of Man. Cumberbatch retired from the navy in December 1945, and was placed on the retired list with the rank of commander.

== Personal life ==
Cumberbatch married Pauline Ellen Laing Congdon, daughter of T. E. Congdon, on 26 April 1934 at St. Mary Abbot's church, Kensington, London. The reception afterwards at the Royal Palace Hotel included nearly 140 guests, including Sir William and Lady McKercher, Sir Alexander and Lady Murray, the Honourable Maurice Baring, Sir Thomas and Lady Catto, Sir Thomas and Lady Neave.

They went on to have two children; a daughter Amber, and a son, Timothy – an actor and father of actor Benedict Cumberbatch.

Commander Cumberbatch died on 27 January 1966 at Buckhurst Manor, Wadhurst, Sussex.
