= Henry Alfred Cumberbatch =

British diplomat (1858–1918)

Henry Alfred Cumberbatch CMG
- Born: 27 June 1858; Berdiansk, Taurida Governorate, Russian Empire
- Died: 3 December 1918 (aged 60)
- Occupation: Diplomat
- Spouse: Helene Gertrude Rees
- Children: 5, including Henry Carlton Cumberbatch
- Parent(s): Robert William Cumberbatch; Louisa Grace Hanson
- Family: Timothy Carlton Cumberbatch (grandson); Benedict Cumberbatch (great-grandson)
- Awards: Order of St Michael & St George

Henry Alfred Cumberbatch CMG (27 June 1858 – 3 December 1918) was a British diplomat who served as a consul in Romania, Turkey and Lebanon.

== Life and career ==
Henry Alfred Cumberbatch was born on 27 June 1858 in Berdiansk, (then part of the Russian Empire, now Ukraine), the son of Robert William Cumberbatch, who was consul there, and his wife Louisa Grace (née Hanson). He was educated at Christ's College, Finchley.

On August 1, 1876, at the age of 18, Cumberbatch was appointed student dragoman in the embassy in Constantinople. Cumberbatch followed his father into the diplomatic service, being appointed vice-consul at Bucharest, Romania, on 26 July 1879, later transferring to Sulina, before being promoted to consul at Adrianople in the Ottoman Empire (now Edirne, Turkey) on 20 March 1888. He was transferred to Angora on 22 July 1893, and while serving as consul there was made a Companion of the Order of St Michael and St George on 20 May 1896. He was appointed consul at Smyrna (now İzmir, Turkey) on 18 November 1896, and consul-general there from 1 April 1900. Cumberbatch was mentioned by Gertrude Bell in her works after a meeting in 1907. On 22 January 1908 Cumberbatch was appointed consul-general for the Vilayet of Beirut and the Mutessariflik of the Lebanon, resident at Beirut, serving there until 1914.

Cumberbatch died 3 December 1918 and was buried 7 December 1918 at Brompton Cemetery, London.

== Personal life ==
Cumberbatch married Helene Gertrude Rees, daughter of Thomas Bowen Rees and American born Ida Josephine Langdon, in Smyrna on 16 January 1891. Their children were:

1. Major Robert Cecil Cumberbatch (1892–1963)
2. Ida Sybil Cumberbatch (1895–1947)
3. Captain Sir Hugh Douglas Cumberbatch (1897–1951)
4. Commander Henry Carlton Cumberbatch RN (1900–1966)
5. Nancy Mary Cumberbatch (1905–1948)

Present descendants include his great-grandson, actor Benedict Cumberbatch, son of actor Timothy Carlton and grandson of Henry Carlton as well as descendants of Robert Cecil who married Nora Skender of Athens and Ida Sybil who married Henry Alwyn Barker of Alexandria.
