= Megan Hunter =

English writer

- Born: 1984 (age 41–42); Manchester, England
- Citizenship: United Kingdom
- Education: University of Sussex; Jesus College, Cambridge
- Occupations: Novelist, poet
- Writing career
- Period: 2017–present
- Notable work: The End We Start From (2017) The Harpy (2020)

Megan Hunter (born 1984) is an English novelist and poet. She is best known for her debut novel The End We Start From (2017), a climate disaster survival story which was adapted into a movie of the same name, released in 2023.

== Early life and education ==
Megan Hunter was born in Manchester, England, in 1984. She wanted to write from childhood. She earned a bachelor's degree in English literature from the University of Sussex, followed by a Master of Philosophy in English Literature: Criticism and Culture from Jesus College, Cambridge.

== Career ==
Hunter's work has appeared in The White Review, The Times Literary Supplement, Literary Hub, and BOMB.

Her debut novel, The End We Start From, was published by Picador in 2017 and follows an environmental crisis in the UK that forces a new mother and her baby to abandon their home in London and flee north. Hunter cites conversations with her children about life and death and her own experiences with motherhood as inspiration for her first novel: "My own children regularly ask about death, and they have also asked me who or where they were before they were born. Partly because of this questioning I often feel the closeness of birth and death, the ways in which they are both the thresholds of life."

== Accolades ==
Hunter's poetry has been shortlisted for the Bridport Prize. Her short story "Selfing" was nominated for the Aesthetica Creative Writing Award.

Her debut novel The End We Start From was a Barnes & Noble Discover Great New Writers Award finalist in 2017 and won the Foreword Reviews Editor's Choice Award; it was also longlisted for the inaugural Aspen Words Literary Prize.

== Personal life ==
Hunter was married to a psychotherapist but they are now separated. They have two children.

== Bibliography ==
- The End We Start From (2017)
- The Harpy (2020)
- Days of Light (2025)
