= Ronin (Marvel Comics) =

Alias used by multiple Marvel characters

- Maya Lopez as Ronin as seen in New Avengers #11 (November 2005). Art by David Finch.
- Publisher: Marvel Comics
- First appearance: New Avengers #11 (November 2005)
- Created by: Brian Michael Bendis, Joe Quesada
- Characters: Maya Lopez; Clint Barton; Alexei Shostakov; Eric Brooks

Ronin is an alias used by multiple characters appearing in American comic books published by Marvel Comics. It was first adopted by Maya Lopez (Echo) in New Avengers #11 (November 2005) by Brian Michael Bendis and Joe Quesada. Following this, the Ronin mantle has been taken up by characters such as Clint Barton (Hawkeye), Alexei Shostakov (Red Guardian), Eric Brooks (Blade), and Bullseye.

Two incarnations of the character appear in the Marvel Cinematic Universe. The first incarnation, Clint Barton (portrayed by Jeremy Renner), appears in the film Avengers: Endgame (2019) and the Disney+ series Hawkeye (2021). The second incarnation, Maya Lopez (portrayed by Alaqua Cox), also appears in Hawkeye and Echo (2024).

== Publication history ==
The persona of Ronin was created by Brian Michael Bendis and Joe Quesada. Bendis stated that the original intention was for Matt Murdock to be the true identity of Ronin, but this was changed due to a conflict with plans in the Daredevil comic book title.

== Fictional character biography ==
=== Maya Lopez ===
The original iteration of Ronin first appeared in New Avengers #11 (November 2005) (although the character appeared on the covers of several earlier issues). Maya Lopez was the first person to take on the Ronin identity.

=== Clint Barton ===
The second iteration of Ronin first appeared in New Avengers #27 (April 2007). Clinton "Clint" Barton is the second person to have used the Ronin identity, after leaving behind his "Hawkeye" alias.

=== Alexei Shostakov ===
Writer Jim McCann revealed "We're going to learn that there is far more to the Ronin identity than anyone knew, pre-dating [the first two versions] before [the third iteration]. Why does Ronin exist? That's a central mystery we will tackle." Alexei Shostakov is the third individual who dons the Ronin identity.

=== Eric Brooks ===
A character (whose identity is initially kept from the reader) is introduced in the Mighty Avengers and dons the Halloween-type Spider Hero costume during the Infinity storyline, and is supplied with the Ronin costume from a "big box of Clint Barton's old stuff" during the Inhumanity storyline. Before being revealed in canon, a leaked script revealed the fourth iteration's true identity to be Eric Brooks.

=== Bullseye ===
In the Hawkeye: Freefall storyline, Barton is Ronin once more to launch an attack on the Hood's criminal empire while the Hood eventually hires Bullseye to find out Ronin's true identity. After learning that Barton is Ronin, the Hood then orders Bullseye to commit crimes dressed in the Ronin costume to ruin Barton's reputation.

== Other versions ==
=== Heroes Reborn ===
In the "Heroes Reborn" miniseries, T'Challa briefly uses the Ronin identity to break into the Squadron Supreme's headquarters and steal files, only to be driven off by Nighthawk.

=== Ultimate Marvel ===
The Ultimate Marvel equivalent of Ronin is an alternate personality of Marc Spector. In order to infiltrate the Kingpin's forces, Ronin proves himself by luring Spider-Man into a fight. The two engage in a brutal battle while Ronin and Moon Knight fight a concurrent battle in Spector's mind. Ronin knocks Spider-Man unconscious and apparently "kills" Moon Knight before taking the youth to the Kingpin for interrogation. However, the Kingpin attacks Ronin, revealing knowledge of Ronin's secret identity. Two of the Kingpin's henchmen take Ronin to a river and execute him. However, Ronin survives his near fatal injuries and goes to the police to provide evidence about the Kingpin's attempt to murder him. He is forced to reveal his identity, but the Kingpin is arrested and the media refer to Spector as a hero.

=== Ultimate Universe ===
In the Ultimate Universe, Ronin is a title used by numerous employees of Roxxon.

== In other media ==
=== Television ===
An original incarnation of Ronin appears in Marvel Disk Wars: The Avengers, voiced by Hideyuki Hori in the Japanese version and Keith Silverstein in the English dub. This version is Nozomu Akatsuki, father of Akira and Hikaru Akatsuki and co-developer of the DISKS (Digital Identity Securement Kit) before becoming Ronin.

=== Marvel Cinematic Universe ===
Multiple incarnations of Ronin appear in media set in the Marvel Cinematic Universe (MCU).

- In the film Avengers: Endgame, Clint Barton (portrayed by Jeremy Renner) becomes Ronin and spends five years killing criminals who survived the Blip.
- In the Disney+ series Hawkeye, the Ronin attire and sword were scavenged and turn up at a black market auction. Kate Bishop (portrayed by Hailee Steinfeld) infiltrates the auction and puts on the Ronin attire to disguise herself and fight off the Tracksuit Mafia. While saving Lucky, footage of her as Ronin is put on the news, leading Barton to seek her out to retrieve the attire. In flashbacks set during the Blip, it is shown that Barton killed Maya Lopez’s father William Lopez, leading to her wanting revenge against Ronin. Barton reveals his identity to Maya in the present and reveals Maya’s surrogate mentor figure Wilson Fisk had Barton kill William based off a tip off made. By the end of the series, after having settled scores with Maya, Barton finally burns the suit at his family barn, ending the Ronin identity seemingly once and for all.
- Archive footage of Barton / Ronin appears in the Disney+ miniseries Echo.

=== Video games ===
- The Maya Lopez incarnation of Ronin appears as a playable character in the PSP version of Marvel: Ultimate Alliance, voiced by Marabina Jaimes.
- The Clint Barton incarnation of Ronin appears as an alternate suit for Clint Barton / Hawkeye in Ultimate Marvel vs. Capcom 3, Marvel Heroes, Marvel Avengers Academy, Marvel Ultimate Alliance 3: The Black Order, Marvel's Avengers, and Marvel Rivals.
- The Clint Barton incarnation of Ronin appears as a playable character in Marvel: Future Fight, Marvel Contest of Champions, and Marvel Puzzle Quest.
- The Eric Brooks incarnation of Ronin appears as a playable character in Lego Marvel's Avengers.

=== Toys ===
- A Minimate of Ronin was released in the 12th series of Marvel Minimates, in a 2-pack with a battle damaged "Riot-Attack" variant of Spider-Man.
- Marvel Legends released a 2-pack of the Clint Barton incarnation of Ronin and Elektra.
- Marvel Universe released a Ronin figure.
