= So This Is Christmas? =

- Hawkeye episode
- Promotional poster
- Episode no.: Episode 6
- Directed by: Rhys Thomas
- Written by: Jonathan Igla; Elisa Climent
- Cinematography by: Eric Steelberg
- Editing by: Tim Roche
- Original release date: December 22, 2021
- Running time: 61 minutes

Cast
- Ava Russo as Lila Barton; Ben Sakamoto as Cooper Barton; Cade Woodward as Nathaniel Barton; Clayton English as Grills; Carlos Navarro as Enrique; Ivan Mbakop as Detective Caudle; Franco Castan as Detective Rivera; Adetinpo Thomas as Wendy; Robert-Walker Branchaud as Orville; Adelle Drahos as Missy; Brian Troxell as Gary; Jonathan Bergman as Armand Duquesne VII

Episode chronology
| ← Previous "Ronin" | Next → — |

"So This Is Christmas?" is the sixth and final episode of the American television miniseries Hawkeye, based on Marvel Comics featuring the characters Clint Barton / Hawkeye and Kate Bishop. The episode follows Barton working with Bishop to learn more about a conspiracy. The episode is set in the Marvel Cinematic Universe (MCU), sharing continuity with the films of the franchise. It was written by Jonathan Igla and Elisa Climent, and directed by Rhys Thomas.

Jeremy Renner reprises his role as Clint Barton from the film series, with Hailee Steinfeld joining him as Kate Bishop. Florence Pugh, Tony Dalton, Fra Fee, Vincent D'Onofrio, Alaqua Cox, Aleks Paunovic, Piotr Adamczyk, Linda Cardellini, and Vera Farmiga also star. Igla joined the series in September 2019, with Thomas joining in July 2020. Filming took place in New York City, with additional filming and soundstage work occurring in Atlanta, Georgia.

"So This Is Christmas?" was released on Disney+ on December 22, 2021. Critics primarily praised the performances of the cast and action sequences.

== Plot ==
Clint Barton and Kate Bishop watch a recording of her mother Eleanor Bishop and crime lord Wilson Fisk breaking off their partnership, (Note: Continuing from the previous episode, "Ronin".) learning that Eleanor killed her fiancée Jack Duquesne's uncle Armand and framed him for the shell corporation Sloan Limited. (Note: As depicted in the previous episodes "Never Meet Your Heroes" and "Ronin".) On Christmas Eve, Barton and Kate attend Eleanor's holiday party, where Kate confronts her mother and learns her father owed money to Fisk, which led to Eleanor working with him. Kazi Kazimierczak attempts to assassinate Eleanor on Fisk's orders, but targets Barton instead. Barton enlists help from Grills, the LARPers, and Duquesne to evacuate the party before rejoining Kate to defeat the Tracksuit Mafia.

After Maya Lopez kills Kazimierczak, Bishop attempts to look for Eleanor. Barton is confronted by Yelena Belova, who demands the truth of her sister Natasha Romanoff's death. (Note: As depicted in Avengers: Endgame (2019).) They fight, but he eventually reminds her of his close friendship with Romanoff and her sacrifice to save the universe. Yelena decides to walk away after sparing him.

Elsewhere, Fisk tries to stop Eleanor from escaping, but Kate arrives and incapacitates him with Barton's trick arrows. Eleanor is then arrested by the police for Armand's murder, while Fisk escapes but is shot by Maya. The next day, Barton returns to his family with Kate and Lucky, returns the watch to Laura, and burns the Ronin suit.

== Production ==
=== Development ===
By April 2019, Marvel Studios was developing a Disney+ series starring Jeremy Renner's Clint Barton / Hawkeye from the Marvel Cinematic Universe (MCU) films, in which Barton would bequeath the mantle of Hawkeye to Kate Bishop. In July 2020, Rhys Thomas was hired to direct three episodes of Hawkeye. Thomas executive produces with series' head writer Jonathan Igla alongside Marvel Studios' Brad Winderbaum, Trinh Tran, Victoria Alonso, Louis D'Esposito, and Kevin Feige. The sixth episode, titled "So This Is Christmas?", was written by Igla and Elisa Climent, and was released on December 22, 2021.

The full performance of "Save the City" from Rogers: The Musical was featured as a mid-credits scene for the episode. Thomas explained that he had been unaware of its inclusion, since it was not the initial plan to include it, and was "slightly conflicted about" its inclusion given he had felt the slot was being reserved for a scene to tease another MCU project, but understood it ended up being "a fun release at the end, and a nice way to send people off".

=== Writing ===
To get back into his character Wilson Fisk since the Marvel Television series Daredevil (2015–2018), Vincent D'Onofrio used emotional events from his personal life and found what would work well for Fisk's emotions, saying "with Fisk, I just speak the authors' words through events that have happened in life, like we have all have, that make us happy or sad". The idea for Fisk to wear the Hawaiian shirt from the "Family Business" story arc in the comics came from D'Onofrio collaborating with the costume department after he had the image of Fisk in the outfit as his computer wallpaper since he started doing Daredevil. Thomas had described the fight scene between Barton and Yelena Belova "a tough one to toggle as well". He wanted the fight choreography to be influenced by the character's emotions, and had described Belova's approach to the fight as "with a mission in mind and almost like a clean sense of justice", while also noting that Barton had a similar motivation in the past. He also added that Barton was willing to die as "there's that sense that, if that's what has to happen for her and for him to perhaps find peace within such thing, you sense that he's at that point where he's come to peace with it".

=== Casting ===
The episode stars Jeremy Renner as Clint Barton / Hawkeye, Hailee Steinfeld as Kate Bishop, Florence Pugh as Yelena Belova, Tony Dalton as Jack Duquesne, Fra Fee as Kazi, Vincent D'Onofrio as Wilson Fisk / Kingpin, Alaqua Cox as Maya Lopez, Aleks Paunovic as Ivan, Piotr Adamczyk as Thomas, Linda Cardellini as Laura Barton, and Vera Farmiga as Eleanor Bishop. Also appearing are Ava Russo as Lila Barton, Ben Sakamoto as Cooper Barton, Cade Woodward as Nathaniel Barton, Clayton English as Grills, Carlos Navarro as Enrique, Ivan Mbakop as Detective Caudle, Franco Castan as Detective Rivera, Adetinpo Thomas as Wendy, Robert-Walker Branchaud as Orville, Adelle Drahos as Missy, Brian Troxell as Gary, and Jonathan Bergman as Armand Duquesne VII.

D'Onofrio was asked by Feige in early 2021 to return as Fisk, which he called extremely exciting and that he was surprised to get the call to return.

=== Design ===
External videos
- Marvel Studios' Hawkeye: Episode 6 End Credits Main On End Title Sequence presents the episode's main-on-end title sequence, YouTube video from Perception's channel

The episode's main-on-end title sequence was designed by Perception. During production, the team had scouted the filming locations for Rockefeller Plaza and had rebuilt the area for filming. They had built a full-size ice rink, with the upper half being located in Atlanta while the other half was located in the Plaza.

=== Filming ===
Filming began in early December 2020 in New York City, including at the Lotte New York Palace Hotel. Additional filming took place at Trilith Studios and Tyler Perry Studios in Atlanta, Georgia. Some scenes from the episode were filmed towards the beginning of production. The production team had filmed a majority of the scenes in the episode in Rockefeller Plaza, with Thomas describing it as a "focal point". The fight scene between Belova and Barton was filmed in one night, with minimal rehearsal on the overall composition of the scene. D'Onofrio's scenes were filmed in secrecy, with D'Onofrio and his stunt doubles being concealed with clothing on set when arriving.

=== Music ===
A portion of the track "Trading Judgement" from Daredevil: Season 3 (Original Soundtrack Album), composed by John Paesano, is reused when Fisk first appears in the episode.

== Marketing ==
After the episode's release, Marvel announced merchandise inspired by the episode, including a Bishop special edition doll, a quiver bow and arrow set of Bishop and a new Barton figure wearing the Hawkeye's costume inspired by the series finale.

== Reception ==
=== Audience viewership ===
According to Nielsen Media Research who measure the number of minutes watched by United States audiences on television sets, Hawkeye was tied for the second-most watched original series across streaming services for the week of December 20–26, with 938 million minutes viewed, which was up 62% from the previous week's 580 million minutes watched. It was also the most weekly minutes viewed for the series, exceeding the 853 million minutes of the two episode premiere week.

=== Critical response ===
The review aggregator website Rotten Tomatoes reports a 100% approval rating with an average rating of 7.6/10, based on 10 reviews.

Keith Phipps of Vulture gave the episode a 3 out of 5, calling the episode "over-stuffed, busy, and more than a little silly", although he said the overall journey was satisfying. He felt at this point the big splashy finales for the MCU shows were becoming less memorable compared to the moments that lead up to them. Phipps thought that the episode "becomes frenetic and over-the-top in ways the previously grounded series had not been" due to all the characters and loose ends that needed to be tied up. He felt that overall the episode was fine, but it fell short of some of the high points preceding it. Writing for Collider, Ross Bonaime gave the episode an "A-", saying "in its season finale, Hawkeye showed Marvel's Disney+ series how to do an ending right". He felt that the finale was able to give closure to all the characters while also setting up new paths for some of them. Bonaime praised the relationship between Barton and Bishop, especially Bishop explaining what makes Hawkeye one of the core Avengers, as well as Barton finally calling Bishop his partner. He liked the way the show integrated Belova into the story and making her essential to both Barton and Bishop's stories. Bonaime concluded by saying "even though Hawkeye, like every MCU series and movie, ended with a big fight scene, this show knows well enough to make the action fun and exhilarating, while also basing the story on character development".

Caroline Siede of The A.V. Club gave the episode a "B". She thought the episode was fun overall, but it didn't elevate the season's weaker throughlines like she had hoped it would. Siede felt that the discovery of Eleanor Bishop's criminal actions should have had a bigger impact on Kate, saying that it felt underplayed. Siede also wasn't a fan of the decision to bring in a notable character like Wilson Fisk just to seemingly kill him off so soon, although she admitted that killing him offscreen gave Marvel the option to bring him back if they wanted to, especially with knowing about Lopez's upcoming Echo series. Siede went on to praise Bishop and Belova, calling their "Princess Bride-style respectful friend fight" charming. She also felt that Natasha Romanoff's death finally truly mattered, finding it emotional to watch Barton and Belova fight through their pain. Overall, Siede felt "despite some missteps, there's plenty to like in an action-packed episode with some moving character beats". Giving the episode a 9 out of 10, Matt Purslow of IGN felt that the episode was the best one of the season, saying that the show "fulfills its promise of festive-flavoured fun with plenty of heart beneath the action-packed wrapping." He felt that by splitting the episode into three showdowns overall, it allowed for character arcs to be "more intimately" wrapped up. He praised the scene of Barton and Belova fighting and grieving over Romanoff's death, although Purslow felt that the special whistle moment felt convenient and too close to the "Martha" scene in the DC Comics film Batman v Superman: Dawn of Justice (2016). Purslow also praised D'Onofrio's performance, calling him a "phenomenal presence", although Purslow notes that the episode did not allow D'Onofrio's Fisk the nuance that Daredevil did. Overall Purslow felt that "Hawkeye's final episode is a fittingly fantastic finale for the most consistent Marvel TV show" so far.

=== Accolades ===
At the 2022 Visual Effects Society Awards, John O'Connell, Tiffany Yung, Orion Terry, and Ho Kyung Ahn were nominated for Outstanding Created Environment in an Episode, Commercial, or Real-Time Project for the Rockefeller Center sequence in the episode.
