= Echo (Marvel Comics) =

Marvel Comics fictional character

Maya Lopez Echo
- Maya Lopez / Echo. Variant cover of Women of Marvel vol 5 #1 (February 2024). Art by Jan Bazaldua.

Publication information
- Publisher: Marvel Comics
- First appearance: As Echo: Daredevil #9 (December 1999); As Ronin: New Avengers #11 (November 2005)
- Created by: David Mack; Joe Quesada

In-story information
- Alter ego: Maya Lopez
- Species: Human
- Team affiliations: Daughters of Liberty; New Avengers; The Hand; Avengers
- Partnerships: Matt Murdock / Daredevil
- Notable aliases: Phoenix; Ronin
- Abilities: Expert martial artist and hand-to-hand combatant; Highly skilled acrobat and athlete; Photographic reflexes; As the Phoenix Force: Superhuman strength, speed, and durability; Cosmic fire generation; Telepathy; Flight

Echo (Maya Lopez) is a character appearing in American comic books published by Marvel Comics. Created by David Mack and Joe Quesada, the character first appeared in Daredevil #9 (December 1999). Lopez is a Cheyenne woman, and this background as an indigenous character informs many of her arcs and storylines. She is also half-Mexican-American. Her Echo guise includes a white handprint that covers part of her face. She is one of the few deaf comic book characters. She has also adopted the Ronin codename and was a host of the Phoenix Force.

Maya Lopez is the adopted daughter of the supervillain Kingpin. She is also a supporting character of the superhero Matt Murdock / Daredevil. The character has been a member of the Avengers and the New Avengers at various points in her history.

Alaqua Cox portrays Maya Lopez in the Disney+ / Marvel Cinematic Universe, debuting in the television series Hawkeye (2021), and starring in her own spin-off series Echo (2024).

== Development ==
=== Concept and creation ===
Writer David Mack created Maya Lopez to mirror Daredevil, saying, "Daredevil deciphers much of his world from sound instead of sight. Echo grew up not having access or understanding of this "audible world" and therefore learned to decipher all of the visual cues of the world as a language that she pieced together by an acute pattern recognition." He was influenced by his Cherokee uncle who told him Native stories as a child to develop the character. Maya Lopez uses American Sign Language to communicate with others.

The Ronin identity was an attempt by Brian Michael Bendis to create a mystery after the apparently male character was depicted on several comic book covers, including issues of New Avengers and one The Pulse issue. Fan speculation was high, with the most common guess that Ronin was Matt Murdock; Bendis eventually revealed this to be the original intention despite initially denying that this was the case. The decision to depict Maya Lopez as Ronin was initially supported by David Mack.

=== Publication history ===
Maya Lopez debuted as Echo in Daredevil #9 (December 1999), created by writer David Mack and artist Joe Quesada. She later debuted as Ronin in New Avengers #11 (November 2005), created by writer Brian Michael Bendis and artist David Finch. She appeared in the 2021 Phoenix Song: Echo series, her first solo comic book series. She appeared in the 2022 Marvel Unlimited Marvel's Voices Infinity Comic series. She appeared in the 2023 Daredevil & Echo series.

== Fictional character biography ==
Maya Lopez. Art by David Mack.

Maya Lopez was still a young girl when her father Willie "Crazy Horse" Lincoln was killed by the Kingpin (Wilson Fisk). Crazy Horse dies, leaving a bloody handprint on Maya's face and a last dying wish: that the Kingpin raise Maya well. Kingpin honors his dying wish, caring for her as his own daughter. Believed to be mentally disabled, Maya is sent to an expensive school for people with learning disabilities. While there, she manages to completely replicate a song on the piano. She is subsequently sent to another expensive school for prodigies.

=== Echo ===
Maya is sent by the Kingpin to prove Matt Murdock's weakness, telling her that Murdock believes Fisk is a bad person and that she is the only way to prove him wrong. As Maya believes Fisk, it would not appear to be a lie when she tells Murdock.

Murdock and Maya soon fall in love. She later takes on the "Echo" guise to hunt down Daredevil. On her face, she paints a white handprint, similar to the bloody handprint left by her father. Maya proves more than a match for Daredevil, having watched videos of Daredevil and Bullseye fighting. After several failed attempts, noticing that Daredevil can easily move through the dark, Maya easily figures out Daredevil's weakness and exploits this by having a fight in a place where Daredevil's heightened senses are useless. Maya easily takes down Daredevil and nearly kills the vigilante, refusing only when she learns that Murdock is Daredevil. Murdock manages to expose the Kingpin's lies. In revenge, Maya confronts and shoots Fisk in the face, blinding Fisk and starting the chain of events that lead to the man's eventual downfall. Kingpin later partially recovered his eyesight through reconstructive eye surgery.

After realizing the horror of her actions and the lies with which she has grown up, Maya flees the United States to do soul-searching. When she comes back, she tries reuniting with Murdock, only to find out Murdock is now with a blind woman, Milla Donovan, and that the Kingpin is still alive. Leaving Murdock, Maya visits the Kingpin in prison who tells her that he does not blame her for what she did, and that he still loves her like a daughter. Unsatisfied and still needing peace, Maya turns to the Chief (her father's old friend) noted for wisdom. The Chief sends Maya on a vision quest to calm her soul. On her quest, she meets and befriends Wolverine who helps her recover and passes on knowledge of Japanese culture and Japanese organized crime. Maya makes peace with her past and is back doing performance art.

=== Ronin and the Avengers ===
Maya Lopez unmasked as Ronin. Art by David Finch.

After a recent identity crisis and feeling unable to join the New Avengers due to a refusal to tarnish the reputations of heroes by working alongside them, Maya dons a suit that conceals her identity as well as her gender and rechristens herself Ronin (Japanese for "wanderer", a class of masterless samurai).

Daredevil recommends Maya to Captain America to aid the Avengers in capturing Silver Samurai in Japan. After joining the Avengers, Maya returns to Japan to keep an eye on Elektra, check on Silver Samurai from time to time, and hopefully solve the conflict between the Hand and Clan Yashida. Around the conclusion of the Civil War between the pro-registration and anti-registration factions in America, Maya fights Elektra and is killed, but is soon resurrected by the Hand. Maya is taken captive and brainwashed to become an assassin for the Hand. She continues to fight the New Avengers until Doctor Strange frees her from the brainwashing. Maya officially hands the Ronin identity over to Clint Barton.

=== Secret Invasion ===
Echo goes with the rest of the New Avengers to the Savage Land when a Skrull ship crash lands. When the ship opens, it reveals various superheroes in outdated outfits. Echo joins with the Mighty Avengers and New Avengers to fight the "old" heroes from the Skrull ship. The battle is then broken up by a dinosaur, causing everyone to split up. Later, she encounters Spider-Woman, who is actually the Skrull queen Veranke. Veranke incapacitates Echo by repeatedly blasting her with venom blasts and then slams her into a nearby tree trunk. Echo helps the other Avengers kill all the other Skrull impostors, then heads to New York and confronts an army of Super Skrulls along with various other heroes and villains.

=== Moon Knight ===
Echo appears in the fourth Moon Knight series, where she works undercover in a strip club in Los Angeles until she blows her cover saving Marc Spector. Moon Knight later proposes that they join forces against the West Coast Kingpin, and invites her to dinner. Moon Knight is obviously attracted to Echo and it is suggested that Echo feels the same, despite punching Moon Knight in the face for kissing her. When she meets up with Moon Knight, they are attacked by the Night Shift. Although Echo and Moon Knight beat them, the police arrive, and attempt to apprehend the duo as well. Echo is killed by Count Nefaria, who aims to become the new West Coast Kingpin.

=== Resurrection ===
Mysterious circumstances later lead to Echo's resurrection. During her first team-up with Daredevil since her return, she helps save New York from a sonic virus created by Klaw.

=== Enter the Phoenix ===
During the "Enter the Phoenix" storyline, Echo is chosen by the Phoenix Force to participate in her tournament alongside many other heroes and villains to decide her next host. Along with the other champions, Echo is empowered by a spark of the Phoenix's cosmic fire and is pitted against Namor in an underwater match. Due to the vast disadvantage, Echo is soundly defeated by Namor, presumably eliminating her from the tournament and losing her portion of the Phoenix's power. However, despite her loss, Echo's despair and refusal to die draws the Phoenix to her, making her the Phoenix's host.

== Powers and abilities ==
Echo can mystically see spoken words as "universal echoes", glowing symbols that she can read to learn a person's hidden truth. This power seems to be triggered when she lip reads a person who is lying to themselves or to her.

Maya Lopez is an Olympic-level athlete. She possesses "photographic reflexes" or the ability to perfectly copy other people's movements. While watching other people, she has become a concert-level pianist, a strong martial artist, a highly skilled acrobat, and a gifted ballerina (and on one occasion even piloted a Quinjet for a few minutes). In addition, she has also gained Daredevil's acrobatic abilities and Bullseye's aim after watching tapes of their fights.

Her absolute reliance on visual cues renders her helpless in the dark, and her ability to communicate by reading lips prevents her from taking oral commands and communicating with people who are wearing masks or are not in direct visual contact; when she initially meets the Avengers, Captain America has to repeat all of Iron Man's questions for her. Notably, she has been incorrectly depicted as able to hear and respond to voices despite not seeing the person's mouth when standing away from them or the person talking right behind her. It has since been established that Maya Lopez can read lips from some distance or with the corner of her eye even if the talker is wearing a mask if the mask is thin enough (as the rather simple fabric masks used by Clint Barton and Spider-Man), and relay their conversation to closer individuals. She still retains her inability to communicate with people wearing sturdier or thicker masks or fully covering their mouths.

Additionally, Maya Lopez has been a host of the Phoenix Force.

== Reception ==
Cian O'Luanaigh of The Guardian stated Maya Lopez possesses an emotional backstory unlike the majority of deaf characters in literature, calling her a "superhero like no other." Dais Johnston of Inverse said Maya Lopez made a "resounding splash" since her introduction, calling her a "great female role model and foil to the blind Matt Murdock." Deirdre Kaye of Scary Mommy called Maya Lopez a "role model" and a "truly heroic" female character. Beaty Drew of Screen Rant named Maya Lopez one of Marvel's most notable Native American heroes, saying, "Maya's inclusion among the publisher's most well-known and minimally flawed heroes reads as honest and realistic." As well as Indigenous, Echo is half-Mexican-American. Comics scholar Frederick Luis Aldama describes Echo as "one of the most fascinating and compelling Latina superheroes to date."

=== Impact ===
Maya Lopez has been described as Marvel's first deaf and indigenous superhero. In the Marvel Cinematic Universe (MCU), Lopez is also depicted as an amputee, making her the first deaf, indigenous, and amputee character in the MCU. Her own miniseries Echo became the first Marvel television show centered on a deaf Native American superhero.

== Literary reception ==
=== Volumes ===
==== Phoenix Song: Echo - 2021 ====
According to Diamond Comic Distributors, Phoenix Song: Echo #1 was the 59th best selling comic book in October 2021.

Dustin Hilland of Comic Book Resources called Phoenix Song: Echo #1 an "enthralling first issue that sets the stage for a thrilling and complex new series," stating, "Phoenix Song: Echo #1 introduces several sources of tension in Echo's life and hints at the beginnings of a few different confrontations of epic proportions. But this comic's strength lies in the intimidating and fascinating character that Roanhorse and Maresca are developing in Echo. Her struggle to maintain her identity while harnessing the power of the Phoenix Force seems to be propelling this series into new and exciting directions." Matthew Aguilar of ComicBook.com gave Phoenix Song: Echo #1 a grade of 3.5 out of 5, writing, "If Phoenix Song: Echo continues the momentum of this issue's second half and delivers on the promise it holds, we could have an amazing series on our hands. If it stays at the surface, it could still be enjoyable, but it won't come near to what it could be. Here's hoping the former is true because all of the elements are here for Phoenix Song: Echo to be something truly special."

== Other versions ==
=== Daredevil: End of Days ===
An alternate universe version of Maya Lopez from Earth-12121 appears in Daredevil: End of Days. This version became a college professor after leaving the Avengers.

=== Heroes Reborn ===
An alternate universe version of Maya Lopez appears in Heroes Reborn. This version was empowered by the Phoenix Force and imprisoned in Ravencroft before Blade and Captain America break her out to help them restore reality.

=== Ultimate Marvel ===
An alternate version of Maya Lopez from Earth-1610 makes a cameo appearance in Ultimate Spider-Man #122.

== In other media ==
=== Television ===
- Maya Lopez / Echo makes cameo appearances in Ultimate Spider-Man as one of several young superheroes who were inspired by Spider-Man and is monitored by S.H.I.E.L.D.
- Maya Lopez appears in two television series set in the Marvel Cinematic Universe, portrayed by Alaqua Cox as an adult and by Darnell Besaw as a child. This version is Choctaw, the leader of the Tracksuit Mafia, and has used a prosthetic leg since childhood. Additionally, Kazimierz "Kazi" Kazimierczak serves as her second-in-command and ASL interpreter.
  - She debuted in the live-action Disney+ series Hawkeye (2021). In flashbacks during the Blip, her father William Lopez was killed by Ronin. In the present, she seeks revenge on Ronin and initially targets Kate Bishop, who inadvertently wore the Ronin suit to fight off Lopez's men, before setting her sights on Clint Barton. However, she learns Barton was tasked by an informant working for Lopez's boss and adoptive father, Wilson Fisk, with killing her father and becomes suspicious of Kazi, who was absent the night of her father's murder. After confronting Kazi, she confronts Fisk.
  - Echo, a spin-off series centered on Lopez, was announced in March 2021 to be in early development for Disney+, with Cox reprising her role and Etan Cohen and Emily Cohen initially set to write and executive produce respectively, later changed to Marion Dayre for both during the official announcement in November 2021. The miniseries premiered on January 9, 2024. Hunted by Wilson Fisk's organization, Maya returns to her hometown in Oklahoma, where she must come to terms with her past, reconnect with her Native American roots, and embrace her family and community.

=== Video games ===
- Maya Lopez / Echo appears as a boss in Daredevil. This version is a villain who believes that the titular character was never in league with the Kingpin.
- Maya Lopez / Ronin appears as an unlockable playable character in the PSP version of Marvel Ultimate Alliance, voiced by Marabina Jaimes. An unmasked variant and her Echo persona appear as alternate costumes while she also appears as an unlockable character in the Wii version via a mod.
- Maya Lopez / Echo appears as a playable character in Marvel Puzzle Quest.
- Maya Lopez / Echo appears as an unlockable playable character in Marvel Future Fight.
- Maya Lopez / Echo appears as an unlockable playable character in Lego Marvel's Avengers, voiced by Tonantzin Carmelo.
- Maya Lopez / Echo appears as a playable card in Marvel Snap.

=== Miscellaneous ===
- Maya Lopez appears in Spider-Man: Hostile Takeover, a prequel novel to the video game Spider-Man. This version was raised to believe Spider-Man killed her father and plots with the Kingpin and Blood Spider to seek revenge. However, Spider-Man proves that Kingpin killed her father, which leads to her allying with Spider-Man. She provides evidence to incriminate the Kingpin, enabling a prosecution and leading into the video game's events.
- In 2024, Funko released a Maya Lopez Funko Pop figure inspired by the Marvel Cinematic Universe (MCU) incarnation of the character.
