= Echoes (Hawkeye) =

- Hawkeye episode
- Promotional poster
- Episode no.: Episode 3
- Directed by: Bert & Bertie
- Written by: Katrina Mathewson; Tanner Bean
- Cinematography by: James Whitaker
- Editing by: Rosanne Tan
- Original release date: December 1, 2021
- Running time: 43 minutes

Cast
- Carlos Navarro as Enrique; Cade Woodward as Nathaniel Barton; Darnell Besaw as young Maya Lopez; Phoenix Crepin as young Kazi

Episode chronology
← Previous "Hide and Seek"	Next → "Partners, Am I Right?"

"Echoes" is the third episode of the American television miniseries Hawkeye, based on Marvel Comics featuring the characters Clint Barton / Hawkeye and Kate Bishop. The episode follows Barton working with Bishop to learn more about a conspiracy. The episode is set in the Marvel Cinematic Universe (MCU), sharing continuity with the films of the franchise. It was written by Katie Mathewson & Tanner Bean and directed by Bert and Bertie.

Jeremy Renner reprise his role as Clint Barton from the film series, with Hailee Steinfeld joining him as Kate Bishop. Tony Dalton, Alaqua Cox, Fra Fee, Aleks Paunovic, Piotr Adamczyk, and Zahn McClarnon also star. Bert and Bertie joined the series in July 2020. Filming took place in New York City, with additional filming and soundstage work occurring in Atlanta, Georgia.

"Echoes" was released on Disney+ on December 1, 2021. Critics praised the episode for its performances, direction, action sequences (particularly the one-shot take), and the introduction of Lopez, but criticized aspects of the pacing.

== Plot ==
In 2007, a 7-year-old Maya Lopez wants to attend an impaired school. Years later, after the Blip, Maya witnesses her father, William, killed by the vigilante Ronin. (Note: As a result of Ronin's campaign in Avengers: Endgame (2019).)

In the present, Maya interrogates Clint Barton and Kate Bishop about Ronin's return. (Note: As depicted in the first episode, "Never Meet Your Heroes".) Despite Barton's attempt to persuade her that Ronin was killed by Black Widow, Maya is dissatisfied as she died. (Note: As depicted in Avengers: Endgame (2019).) Maya attacks Kate, believing her to be Ronin. In the process, Barton's hearing aid is smashed.

Barton releases Kate from Maya's grip, who overpowers Kazi. The two steal a car, eventually escaping the Tracksuit Mafia by jumping onto a moving train. The duo head back to the apartment and Barton receives a call from his son Nathaniel. Kate helps them communicate due to Barton losing his hearing aid. Kate, Barton, and Lucky visit an audiologist in Chinatown to get the hearing aid fixed. Afterwards, Kate tries to convince Barton that he is a role model. They sneak into Kate's mother Eleanor's penthouse, due to Kate's suspicions of Jack Duquesne. After investigating on Eleanor's laptop, Kate is locked out while Duquesne threatens Barton with Ronin's sword.

== Production ==
=== Development ===
By April 2019, Marvel Studios was developing a Disney+ series starring Jeremy Renner's Clint Barton / Hawkeye from the Marvel Cinematic Universe (MCU) films, in which Barton would bequeath the mantle of Hawkeye to Kate Bishop. In July 2020, Bert and Bertie were hired to direct three episodes of Hawkeye. Executive producers for the series include head writer Jonathan Igla, Rhys Thomas, Brad Winderbaum, Trinh Tran, Victoria Alonso, Louis D'Esposito, and Kevin Feige. The third episode, titled "Echoes", was written by Katie Mathewson & Tanner Bean, and was released on December 1, 2021.

=== Writing ===
Directors Bert and Bertie described "The version of Maya we've seen has been born of losing her father, and she reacts to things very emotionally and very in the moment" while calling Kazi "a passionate, more level-headed character". They said that Maya Lopez's life "became about revenge for her father's death" and noted how she had "spent her life driven by that moment when she loses him". Fee felt that Kazi was in a "wonderful" dilemma as "he's trying to keep the organization [Tracksuit Mafia] intact but he's also loyal to her [Lopez]. They have a history together. They've known each other all their lives, and he might be harboring some deeper feelings for her". He also stated that while he cares for Lopez, he thinks that Kazi wants to have more authority than Lopez.

=== Casting ===
The episode stars Jeremy Renner as Clint Barton, Hailee Steinfeld as Kate Bishop, Tony Dalton as Jack Duquesne, Alaqua Cox as Maya Lopez / Echo, Fra Fee as Kazi, Aleks Paunovic as Ivan, Piotr Adamczyk as Thomas, and Zahn McClarnon as William Lopez. Also appearing are Carlos Navarro as Enrique, Cade Woodward as Nathaniel Barton, Darnell Besaw as young Maya Lopez, and Phoenix Crepin as young Kazi. Vincent D'Onofrio makes an uncredited cameo appearance as Wilson Fisk.

Besaw is Cox's real-life cousin, resulting in the younger version of Lopez resembling Cox. The directors were enthralled to have a family connection between the two, with Bertie noting Besaw learned ASL for the role, and had "a wonderful naivety and charm to her that sets up the character in exactly the right way".

=== Design ===
The episode's main-on-end title sequence was designed by Perception.

=== Filming ===
Filming began in early December 2020 in New York City, including at the Lotte New York Palace Hotel. Additional filming took place at Trilith Studios and Tyler Perry Studios in Atlanta, Georgia.

Directors Bert and Bertie were aware when filming actors performing sign language that they filmed their hands as well as their whole body before "punch[ing] in for a close-up moment" based on the advice of Cox and the sign language team on the series. Bertie also noted that there were lines Cox chose not to say because her facial and body expressions would convey what the character was hoping to get across. While they were filming the car chase scene, Bert and Bertie wanted to incorporate more "Christmas moments", and as such, included a Christmas tree lot and trick arrows in the scene. They had cited Bullitt (1968) and The French Connection (1971) as inspirations. Originally, Bert and Bertie wanted to film the scene during nighttime, but Kevin Feige had requested them to film the sequence during the daytime. Bertie also wanted to "stay with our characters and be in the experience with them and experiencing at least the first part of that car chase from inside the car". They used a 360 degree camera to film the scene and had begun conceiving the single-take scene prior to filming in Atlanta.

== Marketing ==
After the episode's release, Marvel announced merchandise inspired by the episode as part of its weekly "Marvel Must Haves" promotion for each episode of the series, including apparel, Marvel Legends figures for Barton and Bishop, and Funko Pops of Bishop and Lopez.

== Reception ==
=== Audience viewership ===
According to Nielsen Media Research who measure the number of minutes watched by United States audiences on television sets, Hawkeye was the third-most watched original series across streaming services for the week of November 29–December 5 with 560 million minutes watched, which was down from the previous week's 853 million minutes watched. Hawkeye was the top streaming series for viewers in the United States for the week ending December 5 according to Whip Media's TV Time.

=== Critical response ===
The review aggregator website Rotten Tomatoes reports a 100% approval rating with an average rating of 8/10, based on 15 reviews.

Matt Purslow of IGN was happy with the direction of Barton and Bishop's dynamic, saying that the series' creative team knew exactly what they were doing with them. He was happy with the fact that the pair were in almost every scene and shot of the episode together as it was "convincingly pushing forward and building up their partnership" as a result. Purslow praised the action, including the variety of trick shots by Barton in the warehouse, as well as the one-shot during the car chase. He said that as a result of the car chase, "directors Bert and Bertie instantly prove themselves among the MCU's best action visionaries". Purslow commended Marvel on casting Cox because it ensured "deafness is more than just a passing mention" as it allowed for authenticity and representation. Overall, Purslow gave the episode an 8 out of 10, with his final verdict saying "Clint and Kate's brilliant dynamic takes centre stage in an action-packed episode that lets all of Hawkeye's best elements shine". Giving the episode a B+, Chancellor Agard of Entertainment Weekly said this was the episode that "fans of Matt Fraction and David Aja's Hawkeye run" had been waiting for. He said that the episode overall was successful, especially with the full introduction of Lopez, as well as "deepening and softening Clint and Kate's dynamic", but felt the ending was unsatisfying and was surprised when it ended because he "felt as though something was missing".

Caroline Siede of The A.V. Club also gave the episode a B+, noting the shift that can be felt due to Hawkeye being the first Marvel Studios series to not have one director for all the episodes. Siede said that the episode "never loses sight of the fact that our hero killed Maya's dad" and as a result it "adds some dark emotional weight to even its zippiest action moments". She felt that the performances of Darnell Besaw and Zahn McClarnon at the beginning of the episode were key to making the episode work. Siede said the laugh of Lopez's "uncle" made her think of Vincent D'Onofrio as Wilson Fisk from the Netflix Daredevil series. Noting that if that was the case "it'd be a big but welcome swing" for him to appear again. She called the car chase an "absolute blast" and liked the variety of trick arrows. Overall Siede was happy where Clint and Kate were at the halfway point of the season. The episode received another B+ from Ross Bonaime of Collider. Bonaime said that after all the set up in the first two episodes, "Echoes" could pivot to the best aspect of the show, which he defined as "the team-up between Barton and Bishop". He felt that between the scenes of young Maya and her father, as well as her seeing her dad killed by Ronin, the series "does a fantastic job of making the audience care about Echo in a relatively short amount of time". He also praised the action, especially the car chase and the use of trick arrows in the scene. Bonaime noted that after the action packed first half of the episode, the second half slowed down considerably, but "considering what's come before, and that this section is clearly just setup for next week, it's hard to fault the episode too much for ending on a weak moment".

=== Accolades ===
At the 2022 Visual Effects Society Awards, Nicholas Hodgson, David Abbott, Nick Cattel, and Jin Choi were nominated for Outstanding Created Environment in an Episode, Commercial, or Real-Time Project for the Manhattan Bridge sequence in the episode. Carl Richard Burden, Noon Orsatti, Renae Moneymaker, and Crystal Hooks were nominated for Outstanding Stunt Performance at the 74th Primetime Creative Arts Emmy Awards.
