= Tuklo =

Tuklo may refer to:

- "Tuklo" (Echo), a 2024 TV episode
- Tuklo, a character from Echo
