= Hide and Seek (Hawkeye) =

- Hawkeye episode
- Promotional poster
- Episode no.: Episode 2
- Directed by: Rhys Thomas
- Written by: Elisa Climent
- Cinematography by: Eric Steelberg
- Editing by: Terel Gibson
- Original release date: November 24, 2021
- Running time: 51 minutes

Cast
- Ava Russo as Lila Barton; Ben Sakamoto as Cooper Barton; Cade Woodward as Nathaniel Barton; Clayton English as Grills; Carlos Navarro as Enrique; Ivan Mbakop as Detective Caudle; Tinashe Kajese-Bolden as Dee; Adetinpo Thomas as Wendy; Robert-Walker Branchaud as Orville; Adelle Drahos as Missy; Rhys Bhatia as Stevie; Pat Kiernan as himself

Episode chronology
← Previous "Never Meet Your Heroes"	Next → "Echoes"

"Hide and Seek" is the second episode of the American television miniseries Hawkeye, based on Marvel Comics featuring the characters Clint Barton / Hawkeye and Kate Bishop. The episode follows Barton working with Bishop to learn more about a conspiracy. The episode is set in the Marvel Cinematic Universe (MCU), sharing continuity with the films of the franchise. It was written by Elisa Climent and directed by Rhys Thomas.

Jeremy Renner reprise his role as Clint Barton from the film series, with Hailee Steinfeld joining him as Kate Bishop. Tony Dalton, Alaqua Cox, Fra Fee, Aleks Paunovic, Piotr Adamczyk, Linda Cardellini, and Vera Farmiga also star. Thomas joined the series in July 2020. Filming took place in New York City, with additional filming and soundstage work occurring in Atlanta, Georgia.

"Hide and Seek" was released on Disney+ on November 24, 2021. Critics praised the chemistry and performances of Renner and Steinfeld and the LARPing sequence.

== Plot ==
After encountering Kate Bishop in an alley, Clint Barton is taken to her apartment before they are shortly attacked by the Tracksuit Mafia, who set fire to the place. Barton, Kate, and Lucky are forced to evacuate, leaving the Ronin suit behind. After relocating to Kate's vacationing aunt's apartment, Barton returns to Kate's apartment to pick up the suit, only to find out that it's gone. It's been taken by a firefighter. The next morning, he sends his children back home, but promises to return by Christmas Day.

Barton escorts Kate to her workplace and then recovers the Ronin suit at a LARPing event from the firefighter named Grills. Later, Kate fails to convince Eleanor Bishop of Jack Duquesne's involvement in his uncle Armand Duquesne's death. After challenging Duquesne to a fencing duel, she tries to contact Barton, but learns that Barton knowingly allowed himself to be captured by the Tracksuit Mafia. She tracks down Barton's location but ends up being captured herself. The gang informs their leader, Maya Lopez, of Barton and Kate's captivity.

== Production ==
=== Development ===
By April 2019, Marvel Studios was developing a Disney+ series starring Jeremy Renner's Clint Barton / Hawkeye from the Marvel Cinematic Universe (MCU) films, in which Barton would bequeath the mantle of Hawkeye to Kate Bishop. In July 2020, Rhys Thomas was hired to direct three episodes of Hawkeye. Thomas executive produces with series' head writer Jonathan Igla alongside Marvel Studios' Brad Winderbaum, Trinh Tran, Victoria Alonso, Louis D'Esposito, and Kevin Feige. The second episode, titled "Hide and Seek", was written by Elisa Climent, and was released on November 24, 2021.

=== Writing ===
Igla felt that it was important to show the lasting impact of all the blows that Barton has taken over the years, despite being in great shape and knowing how to take a hit, as he is just a normal guy. The use of the montage showing what Barton had gone through in past MCU appearances was to remind the audience of the "scale of things that he has been through, partly in contrast to the scale of the challenge that it feels like he's facing now". Igla felt that based on what he was told and saw, it was a collection of events that eventually led to Barton's hearing loss, as opposed to one cause, so for the montage, Igla wanted to feature clips of "the biggest, most cinematic, expensive-looking explosion and Avengers-level offense that he has been through".

=== Casting ===
The episode stars Jeremy Renner as Clint Barton, Hailee Steinfeld as Kate Bishop, Tony Dalton as Jack Duquesne, Alaqua Cox as Maya Lopez / Echo, Fra Fee as Kazi, Aleks Paunovic as Ivan, Piotr Adamczyk as Thomas, Linda Cardellini as Laura Barton, and Vera Farmiga as Eleanor Bishop.

=== Design ===
External videos
- Marvel Studios' Hawkeye: Episode 2 End Credits Main On End Title Sequence presents the episode's main-on-end title sequence, YouTube video from Perception's channel

The episode's main-on-end title sequence was designed by Perception. An extra LARPer wears an outfit based on Hawkeye's original purple and blue costume from the comics.

=== Filming ===
Filming began in early December 2020 in New York City, including in Downtown Brooklyn at the Hoyt–Schermerhorn Streets subway station, and in Midtown Manhattan. Additional filming took place at Trilith Studios and Tyler Perry Studios in Atlanta, Georgia.

== Marketing ==
After the episode's release, Marvel announced merchandise inspired by the first two episodes as part of its weekly "Marvel Must Haves" promotion for each episode of the series, including apparel and Funko Pops of Hawkeye and Bishop with Lucky.

== Reception ==
=== Audience viewership ===
The viewer tracking application Samba TV reported that the episode was watched by an estimated 1.3 million households in the first five days, while the first episode was watched by 1.5 million households. According to Nielsen Media Research who measure the number of minutes watched by United States audiences on television sets, Hawkeye was the second-most watched original series across streaming services for the week of November 22–28 with 853 million minutes watched. The two-episode premiere of Hawkeye was the top streaming series for viewers in the United States for the week ending November 28 according to Whip Media's TV Time.

=== Critical response ===
The review aggregator website Rotten Tomatoes reports a 93% approval rating with an average rating of 7.7/10, based on 14 reviews.

Jack Shepherd of GamesRadar+ gave the episode a 4 out of 5 and said that Renner and Steinfeld had "electrifying chemistry." He thought both got a chance to shine, both together and separately. Shepherd said the LARPing scenes were the best part of the episode largely due to the fact that "Hawkeye's tough-as-nails straight-man act plays wonders". He really liked when Barton and Bishop were together, saying that their pairing was "the standout element of the show so far". As a result, he said when the pair were apart "the series slows down arguably too much". In giving "Hide and Seek" a 4 out of 5, Keith Phipps of Vulture said the story was able to get down to business after the exposition heavy first episode and praised the chemistry between Renner and Steinfeld.

Kirsten Howard of Den of Geek gave the two-episode premiere a 4.5 out of 5, saying that "Steinfeld is predictably great in the role [of Bishop]". Howard felt that "Marvel Studios has created an appealing, Die Hard-esque world for Clint Barton" and the more grounded approach to the series suited him. Matt Purslow of IGN also praised the chemistry between Renner and Steinfeld, saying that "while the duo makes for an energetic feel, there are elements at play that keep things human and weighty", but added that Steinfeld specifically stole the show. Purslow felt that up to this point "the Hawkeye the title refers to is almost certainly Kate." He liked the balance of the LARPing scene as it was consistently funny, while he also felt that it did a good job showing "Barton's reluctance to being pulled into a conflict."
