= Taloa =

Taloa may refer to:

- "Taloa" (Echo), an episode of Echo
- Taloa (Marvel Cinematic Universe), a character from Echo
