= Heroes Reborn (2021 comic) =

2021 Marvel Comics storyline

- Variant cover to Heroes Reborn #1 by Ed McGuinness.
- Publisher: Marvel Comics
- Publication date: May – June 2021
- Main characters: Squadron Supreme; Avengers; Phil Coulson

Creative team
- Writer: Jason Aaron
- Artist: Ed McGuinness

"Heroes Reborn" is a 2021 comic book storyline published by Marvel Comics, consisting of a central miniseries written by Jason Aaron and illustrated by Ed McGuinness, as well as a number of tie-in books. The storyline explores a Marvel Universe without the Avengers, though it is unrelated to the 1996–97 storyline of the same name. The plot involves a change in the timeline of the Marvel Universe, which results in a continuity in which the Squadron Supreme are Earth's mightiest heroes while the Avengers never came to be. However, the vampire slayer Blade is the only one aware of the change in history and works to uncover the mystery behind it. The crossover overall received mixed reviews with critics.

== Publication history ==
In 2021, Marvel published a "Heroes Reborn" story that explores "a world without Avengers". In this story, the Marvel Universe was altered so that the Avengers were never formed, and the Squadron Supreme are the biggest superhero team instead. The story is written by Jason Aaron, writer of the ongoing comic of The Avengers at the time, and the plot continues some plots used in that comic.

Aaron explained that the storyline is unrelated to the 1996–97 storyline of the same name headed by Jim Lee and Rob Liefeld, aside from the series' name: "This story really has nothing whatsoever to do with the original "Heroes Reborn" event. The only similarity is that this is a look into another version of the Marvel Universe, one familiar in some ways, but profoundly and fundamentally changed in others. I'm quite confident in saying it's a world unlike any version of the Marvel U we've ever seen before".

In addition to the central miniseries, a number of tie-in books give the backstory of the new "Heroes Reborn" universe. One of them is Heroes Reborn: Siege Society by writer Cody Ziglar, artist Paco Medina and colorist Pete Pantazis, and is about a supervillain group, including villains who never reformed into heroes because of the absence of the Avengers. This group consisted of Fire-Ant, Black Widow, Hawkeye, Sabretooth, Silver Witch, and a Russian version of U.S. Agent called Soviet Agent.

== Plot ==
As Blade wanders East Los Angeles, California, he notices changes in his reality after seeing Robbie Reyes rushing to school on a bicycle. He soon finds that the Avengers were never formed in this reality after its founding members were indisposed or became preoccupied, such as Bruce Banner being banished to the Negative Zone after he first became the Hulk, Carol Danvers becoming an insubordinate Air Force pilot rather than a captain, and Tony Stark remaining an arms dealer. In Norway, Blade finds an alcoholic human Thor, who claims not to have heard of Mjolnir and that Odin is dead after the All-Gog destroyed Asgard before driving Blade off. Days later, Doctor Juggernaut leads the Masters of Doom in an attack on Washington, D.C., only to be repelled by the Squadron Supreme of America. Upon learning of this, Blade suspects the Squadron is responsible for the changes and confronts Squadron member Nighthawk to learn more, but to no avail. Following this, Blade travels to the Arctic and finds a frozen Captain America, while Thor suddenly finds his mug has transformed into Mjolnir.

Squadron member Hyperion is called to S.H.I.E.L.D. Labs by head scientist Reed Richards after several supervillains escape from the Negative Zone. Hyperion defeats and recaptures several of them quickly, but while fighting Mister Beyonder and the Hulk however, they claim that this world is wrong. In particular, the latter retains his memories of the Avengers. After defeating Beyonder and killing the Hulk, a shaken Hyperion flies to the sun to ruminate on everything his enemies said. He considers the world might be a lie, but ultimately accepts it. Later, a revived and disguised Captain America visits Hyperion to learn what happened to the United States since he disappeared before returning to Blade to help him restore the world to the way it was.

Amidst the Masters of Doom's attack on Washington D.C., the Silver Witch steals the soul of Squadron member the Blur. In his attempt to get it back, he phases through time and encounters the Ghost Runner. After recalling his training with the Ancient One, the Blur gets his soul back, defeats the Silver Witch, and races Eternity. Meanwhile, Blade and Captain America recruit a Phoenix Force-empowered Maya Lopez from Ravencroft.

Years prior, bounty hunter Rocket Raccoon and his sentient rifle Groot find a baby girl bearing the Star Brand floating in space and adopt her. In the present, Uatu the Watcher and several alien species hire Rocket and Groot to help them get revenge on Squadron member and intergalactic lawman Doctor Spectrum. Rocket and Groot attack Spectrum after he defeats Thanos, but Spectrum overpowers Rocket and destroys Groot. In retaliation, Rocket uses his own Star Brand, but Spectrum defeats the latter and drowns him in a supernova to make him reveal his employers. As Rocket dies, a pre-recorded message on his ship advises the girl to stay safe. On Earth, Spectrum meets with President Phil Coulson in a church dedicated to Mephisto regarding Rocket's attack and the Blur's concerns about reality being tampered with. Meanwhile, the girl wants to avenge Rocket, but another Groot stops her before they are met by Captain Okoye of the Wakandan Space Fleet.

After several patients try to break out of Ravencroft, police commissioner Luke Cage calls in Nighthawk to stop them. Nighthawk defeats most of them easily, but experiences trouble with the Black Skull, whose symbiote wants to return to Nighthawk, and Deadpool, who intends to kill him despite being ordered not to by the breakout's mastermind the Goblin. After defeating the Black Skull and Deadpool, Nighthawk confronts the Goblin, who exposes the former's partner Dr. Gwen Stacy/Nightbird to Goblin Gas in order to make her kill Nighthawk. While Nighthawk cures Stacy and spares the Goblin, the villain commits suicide while revealing to Nighthawk how the world has changed. Following this, Nighthawk returns to his headquarters to review Ravencroft's surveillance footage and discovers Blade and Captain America helped Lopez escape. Later, Black Panther assumes the Ronin alias and breaks into the Squadron's headquarters to steal their files. After fighting Nighthawk, he escapes and joins Blade's group.

Amidst Squadron member Power Princess's fight with the All-Gog, she allows him to swallow one of her gauntlets before recalling it from within his stomach, severely injuring him before she turns him into a statue to add to her garden outside the Statue of Liberty amongst her other defeated foes. Retiring to her headquarters, she considers having a dalliance with Hyperion or Nighthawk to alleviate her boredom. However, a mysterious thunderstorm brings most of her statues back to life. Acting quickly, she subdues Hercules and interrogates him for the storm's cause, but he refuses to talk before being turned back into a statue. Seeking answers, Power Princess travels to Asgard's ruins, where she encounters and fights a confused Thor to reclaim her title as the world's last god. However, she is unable to kill him because of Mjolnir's unseen protection. Picking up Mjolnir and reclaiming his godhood, Thor tells Power Princess he remembers everything about the Avengers before escaping. While Power Princess tells her fellow Squadron members what happened, Lopez meets with Thor to recruit him.

The Squadron discuss their encounters with various heroes and concerns about their world being wrong. Putting aside their differences and without telling President Coulson, they gather clues and rule out suspects before eventually arriving in Wakanda, where they confront the Avengers. Meanwhile, Coulson assassinates White House Press Secretary J. Jonah Jameson and Vice President Thunderbolt Ross and confers with Mephisto, who is concerned about this reality's stability as more people see or learn of the Avengers and slowly regain their memories of the original reality. Seeing no other choice, Coulson plans to use the Pandemonium Cube in an attempt to defeat the Avengers and change reality once more.

As the Avengers battle and eventually defeat the Squadron, Coulson flies to Wakanda to enact his plans. However, Captain America confronts Coulson and takes the Pandemonium Cube from him so Star Brand and Lopez can use it to restore the original reality. Following this, the Avengers come to terms with the baby Star Brand they were raising having suddenly grown up to a child, while the Squadron find their memories transferred to their counterparts in the Avengers' reality and struggle to find their place in an unfamiliar world. Meanwhile, Mephisto traps Coulson's soul in the Pandemonium Cube before meeting with 615 of his warring multiversal doppelgängers to demonstrate how he changed reality to them and propose they form the Council of Red.

== Issues involved ==
=== Main issues ===
- Heroes Reborn #1–7
- Heroes Return #1

=== Tie-in issues ===
- Heroes Reborn: American Knights #1
- Heroes Reborn: Hyperion & the Imperial Guard #1
- Heroes Reborn: Magneto & the Mutant Force #1
- Heroes Reborn: Marvel Double Action #1
- Heroes Reborn: Night-Gwen #1
- Heroes Reborn: Peter Parker, The Amazing Shutterbug #1
- Heroes Reborn: Siege Society #1
- Heroes Reborn: Squadron Savage #1
- Heroes Reborn: Young Squadron #1
- Heroes Reborn: Weapon X & Final Flight #1

== Reception ==
Sam Stone, writing for Comic Book Resources, wrote that the series had a strong start, being both of interest to those who had been following Aaron's work with The Avengers and easy to understand by a casual reader, unaware of it. He also praised the art, and pointed that the comic had bigger scenes than those seen in The Avengers.

The series overall received mixed reviews. On Comic Book Roundup, the entire series received a score of 7.4 out of 10 based on 66 reviews. Blue Fox from Comic Book Dispatch wrote: "Honestly, Heroes Reborn #7's main story feels more like a filler than a story that stands on its own merits. It does its job as a penultimate set-up but has so little to give as a story that It could've been done in ten pages or less. And please Aaron, eviscerate Blur in the next issue. I just can't stand another word from that braggart. Furthermore, the "back-up" seems to hold most of the meat in the overall story. Ultimately, readers get set up for the next Heroes Reborn issue".

Jimmy Hayes from Comic Watch wrote that "this is a comic book... definitely not everyone's cup of tea, and certainly not conducive to a miniseries that only has one issue left to go". Brett from Graphic Policy gave a mixed review: "Heroes Reborn #7 like the issue before both works and doesn't. There's some great ideas and concepts but it never quite clicks and flows. Everything feels too short and like it's missing that moment that really hits you. The fact that it ends as just one chapter doesn't help matters. This is another Marvel event that doesn't hit the mark".

Olly McNamee from ComicCon commented that "Heroes Return #1 is an amazing book visually, but another wasted opportunity giving us a very predictable dust-up between The Supreme Squadron of America and the Avengers. Well, some of them anyway. A series that seems deigned to set up the next big title-wide crossover for Marvel which I'll be giving a miss based on this slim storyline stretched out to breaking point. Whatever the opposite of 'Excelsior' is, this is that series".

Zack Quaintance from Comics Bookcase wrote that "Heroes Return #1 marks the end of a bloated alternate Marvel Universe story that lacks a point or anything much to say, besides hey wouldn't this be kind of interesting? And the answer to that is yes, but not for two months and eight issues". Nicole Drum from Comic Book.com said that "Heroes Return #1 is okay and that's probably the best and also the most complete thing one can say about it".

== Collected editions ==
Title	Material collected	Published date	ISBN
Heroes Reborn: America’s Mightiest Heroes	Heroes Reborn (vol. 2) #1-7, Heroes Return #1	August 2021	978-1302929572
Heroes Reborn: America’s Mightiest Heroes Companion Vol. 1	Heroes Reborn: Hyperion & the Imperial Guard #1, Heroes Reborn: Peter Parker, the Amazing Shutterbug #1, Heroes Reborn: Magneto & the Mutant Force #1, Heroes Reborn: Young Squadron #1, Heroes Reborn: Siege Society #1	September 2021	978-1302931131
Heroes Reborn: America’s Mightiest Heroes Companion Vol. 2	Heroes Reborn: Squadron Savage #1, Heroes Reborn: Marvel Double Action #1, Heroes Reborn: American Knights #1, Heroes Reborn: Night-Gwen #1, Heroes Reborn: Weapon X & Final Flight #1	September 2021	978-1302931148
Heroes Reborn: America's Mightiest Heroes Omnibus	Heroes Reborn (vol. 2) #1-7, Heroes Return #1, Heroes Reborn: Hyperion & the Imperial Guard #1, Heroes Reborn: Peter Parker, the Amazing Shutterbug #1, Heroes Reborn: Magneto & the Mutant Force #1, Heroes Reborn: Young Squadron #1, Heroes Reborn: Siege Society #1, Heroes Reborn: Squadron Savage #1, Heroes Reborn: Marvel Double Action #1, Heroes Reborn: American Knights #1, Heroes Reborn: Night-Gwen #1, Heroes Reborn: Weapon X & Final Flight #1	August 2022	978-1302945190
