= Tinashe Kajese-Bolden =

Zimbabwean-American actress

- Born: Tinashe Kajese; Durham, England
- Occupations: Actress, Theatre Director
- Years active: 2004-present
- Spouse: Keith Arthur Bolden (2007-present)
- Children: 3

Tinashe Kajese-Bolden is a Zimbabwean-American actress, director, and producer. She is best known for her portrayal of Flo Crawley in the DC Extended Universe productions, The Suicide Squad (2021), and Peacemaker. She later reprised the role in the DC Universe film Superman (2025).

== Early and personal life ==
Kajese-Bolden was born Tinashe Kajese, in Durham, England, to a Zimbabwean father and a German-American mother. Her family moved to Zimbabwe in 1980, following its independence from the United Kingdom. She moved to the United States in 1998 to pursue a degree in theatre at the University of Illinois Urbana-Champaign. There, she met actor and director, Keith Arthur Bolden, whom she later married in 2007. She has three children with him, including a step-son. She lives in Atlanta with her husband.

== Career ==
Kajese-Bolden began her acting career with small roles in American film and television. She made appearances in Cold Case, Enlightened, and Powers. She later appeared in the HBO film, The Immortal Life of Henrietta Lacks, playing the younger version of Leslie Uggams' character, Sadie.

She went on to appear in the Marvel Cinematic Universe miniseries Hawkeye as Dee, and later in The Guardians of the Galaxy Holiday Special as Officer Fitzgibbon.

Kajese-Bolden gained wider recognition in 2021 after appearing as A.R.G.U.S aide, Flo Crawley, in the DC Extended Universe film, The Suicide Squad, directed by James Gunn. She later reprised the character in Gunn's The Suicide Squad spinoff television series, Peacemaker, in an uncredited cameo. In 2025, Kajese-Bolden appeared again as the character in the DC Universe film, Superman, now a U.S. Secretary.

In 2019 she was awarded the Princess Grace Award by the Princess Grace Foundation. Recognising her work and talents as an emerging theatre director.

Since 2023 she has served as the co-artistic director of the Alliance Theatre.

== Filmography ==
=== Film ===
Year	Title	Role	Notes
2004	Superstore	Clerk	Short Film
2007	Day Zero	Rifkin's Secretary	Credited as Tinashe Kajese
2017	The Immortal Life of Henrietta Lacks	Young Sadie	Credited as Tinashe Kajese
2021	Saints and Sinners: Judgement Day	Jaleesa	Credited as Tinashe Kajese
2021	The Suicide Squad	Flo Crawley	Credited as Tinashe Kajese
2021	Christmas Déjà Vu	Danielle	Credited as Tinashe Kajese
2023	Strays	Cathy	Uncredited
2025	Superman	Flo Crawley	Credited as Tinashe Kajese Bolden

=== Television ===
Year	Title	Role	Notes
2008	Cold Case	Belinda Hutchins '64	Episode: "Wednesday's Women"
2010	Semi-Dead	Melanie	Episode: "Let's Get it Poppin'"
2011	Enlightened	Receptionist	Episode: "Pilot"
2015	Born Again Virgin	Renee	Episode: "No New Friends"
2016	Powers	Staffer	Episode: "Origins"
2016	Outcast	Cop 1	Episode: "The Road Before Us"
2016	Greenleaf	Mrs. Russell	Episode: "Meaningful Survival"
2017-2018	Valor	May Haskins	Three Episodes
2018	The Inspectors	Sharice Lawrence	Two Episodes
2018	The Bobby Brown Story	Actress	Three Episodes
2021	Dynasty	Val	Episode: "Everybody loves the Carringtons"
2021	Hawkeye	Dee	Episode: "Hide and Seek"
2022	Peacemaker	Flo Crawley	Uncredited. Episode: "A Whole New Whirled"
2022	Cherish the Day	Lynette	Four Episodes
2022	The Guardians of the Galaxy Holiday Special	Officer Fitzgibbon	TV Special
