= Jason Gavin (writer) =

Jason Gavin is a television writer. He has worked on Friday Night Lights, Royal Pains, Greek, Hawaii Five-0, Chambers, Roswell, New Mexico, Dark Winds, and Echo as a writer. He has worked on Roswell, New Mexico, Dark Winds, and Echo as a producer. He was nominated for a Writers Guild of America (WGA) Award for Best Dramatic Series at the February 2009 ceremony for his work on the third season of Friday Night Lights. He was nominated for the WGA Award for Best Drama Series for a second consecutive year at the February 2010 ceremony for his work on the fourth season.
