= Kira Kelly =

American cinematographer

- Born: Kira Denise Kelly
- Education: Northwestern University (BS)
- Occupation: Cinematographer
- Years active: 1998–present
- Website: www.kirakellydp.com

Kira Denise Kelly is an American cinematographer. She is perhaps best known for her work on 13th, which earned her an Emmy Award nomination, and the cable series Queen Sugar.

== Career ==
Kelly is a graduate of Northwestern University with a major in Radio/Television/Film. Her professional film career began as an electrician. In a 2017 interview on the public radio series The Frame, she indicated that she would also "shoot any project I could get my hands on."

She also learned a lot from working as a gaffer on bigger budget projects. Her early work as a cinematographer included two features directed by Tom Gustafson and the Hulu series East Los High.

A big break in her career occurred when Ava DuVernay reached out to her through social media. This eventually led to Kelly being hired to work on 13th, for which she received an Emmy Award nomination.

== Influences ==
Kelly is influenced by the work of Rinko Kawauchi, Martina Hoogland Ivanow, and Cy Twombly.

== Selected filmography ==
=== Film ===
Year	Title	Director	Notes
2008	Reflections	Eli Hershiko	
2008	America's Shadows: HIV Risk in Black & Latino Youth	Tchaiko Omawale	
2008	Were the World Mine	Tom Gustafson	
2009	Estilo Hip Hop	Virgilio Bravo and Loira Limbal	
2012	Changing Face of Harlem	Shawn Batey	
2012	Mariachi Gringo	Tom Gustafson	
2013	Pop Star	Carlos Portugal	
2014	Back on Board: Greg Louganis	Cheryl Furjanic	
2016	13th	Ava DuVernay	Emmy Award nomination
2019	Skin in the Game	Adisa	
2021	Shang-Chi and the Legend of the Ten Rings	Destin Daniel Cretton	Additional photography
2024	Rez Ball	Sydney Freeland	
2025	Him	Justin Tipping	
2026	Misty Green	Chris Rock	

=== Television ===
Year	Title	Director(s)	Notes
2020	Madam C. J. Walker	Kasi Lemmons and DeMane Davis	
2019	The Red Line	Kevin Hooks, et al.	
2017-2019	Queen Sugar	Ava DuVernay, et al.	
2017	Iron Maidens		
2013-2016	East Los High	Carlos Portugal, et al.	
2021	Y: The Last Man	Louise Friedberg, Daisy von Scherler Mayer	2 episodes
2024	Echo	Sydney Freeland	4 episodes

== Awards and recognition ==
- Nominated – Emmy Award for 13th
