= Maya Lopez (Marvel Cinematic Universe) =

Character in the Marvel Cinematic Universe

- Marvel Cinematic Universe character
- Alaqua Cox as Maya Lopez / Echo in Echo (2024)
- First appearance: "Hide and Seek"; Hawkeye; (2021)
- Based on: Echo by: David Mack; Joe Quesada
- Adapted by: Elisa Climent
- Portrayed by: Alaqua Cox; Darnell Besaw (young)

In-universe information
- Alias: Echo
- Species: Human
- Occupation: Gangster
- Affiliation: Tracksuit Mafia
- Family: William Lopez (father); Taloa (mother); Henry "Black Crow" Lopez (paternal uncle); Bonnie (cousin); Biscuits (cousin); Chula (maternal grandmother)
- Nationality: Native American

Maya Lopez, also known as Echo, is a character portrayed by Alaqua Cox in the Marvel Cinematic Universe (MCU) media franchise—based on the Marvel Comics character of the same name. Maya is depicted as a deaf Native American Choctaw and the commander of the Tracksuit Mafia, a criminal gang in New York City working for Wilson Fisk / Kingpin, who is Maya's adoptive uncle.

Maya had a confrontation with the vigilantes Daredevil and Clint Barton, who was her father's killer. During her confrontation with Barton and his ally, Kate Bishop, Maya discovered that Fisk had orchestrated her father's death. Maya escapes from New York, returning to her hometown in Oklahoma, where she's hunted by Fisk's organization, the Black Knife Cartel, though her family's lives would also be in danger.

Maya Lopez made her debut in the Disney+ miniseries Hawkeye (2021), prior to starring in her own spin-off miniseries Echo (2024). Darnell Besaw, Cox's cousin, played a young version of the character in both Hawkeye and Echo.

== Concept and creation ==
=== Background and development ===
The Marvel Comics character Maya Lopez / Echo was created by writer David Mack and artist Joe Quesada, and made her first appearance in Daredevil vol. 2 #9 (December 1999). During the development of the Marvel Cinematic Universe (MCU) series Moon Knight (2022) for Disney+, Marvel Studios was interested in including Maya in one of their projects. Because the character is a love interest of the series' protagonist, Marc Spector / Moon Knight, in the comics, the creator of Moon Knight, Jeremy Slater, and the writers considered using Maya that way in the series as well. However, she did not fit the story they were trying to tell and Marvel Studios eventually decided to use the character in their Hawkeye (2021) miniseries instead. This decision was supported by the Moon Knight creatives.

The development of Maya Lopez in the Marvel Cinematic Universe also emphasized authentic casting and creative involvement. Alaqua Cox, who is Menominee and Mohican and deaf, was cast as Maya Lopez after responding to a casting call, despite having no previous major acting experience. For the character's solo series, director Sydney Freeland said the production worked with the Choctaw Nation of Oklahoma and used deaf writers, deaf consultants, an American Sign Language master, and deaf Indigenous actors to support the show's representation of Maya's background. Freeland, who is Navajo, also described the series as an opportunity to center Indigenous and deaf representation within a superhero story.

The production also adapted elements of Maya's on-screen characterization around Cox's own experiences. Cox has discussed how the series incorporated American Sign Language and Indigenous creative input, while also reflecting her experience as an amputee through the character's design and action scenes. Freeland said that the series also expanded Maya's family relationships beyond her father by including her mother, grandmother, and other relatives, which helped connect the character's conflict to family and community rather than only revenge. These choices helped distinguish the MCU version of Maya from earlier versions of Echo in Marvel Comics by connecting the character's abilities, identity, and physicality more closely to Cox's portrayal and to the series' focus on family, culture, and community.

=== Casting and appearances ===
In June 2020, Marvel Studios began searching for an actress to portray a character named "Malia" for an upcoming Disney+ series. The production company was seeking a deaf Native American woman for the role. It was rumored that "Malia" was a codename for Maya Lopez / Echo. Deaf and amputee newcomer Alaqua Cox was initially hesitant to audition for the role of Maya, but her friends encouraged her to give it a try. Despite her doubts, she submitted a self-tape to Marvel's casting director Sarah Finn in 2020. She went through an audition process a few months later. Cox later received a message from a Marvel agent asking her to join a Zoom meeting. Marvel Studios president Kevin Feige appeared during the call and informed her that she had secured the role. Cox's casting was officially announced in December 2020. Darnell Besaw portrayed a young Maya in Hawkeye. Besaw is Cox's real-life cousin, resulting in the younger version of Maya resembling Cox. The directors Bert and Bertie were enthralled to have a family connection between the two, with Bertie noting Besaw learned American Sign Language (ASL) for the role, and had "a wonderful naivety and charm to her that sets up the character in exactly the right way".

Following Cox's performance in Hawkeye, Marvel Studios decided to develop a spin-off series centered on Maya. Cox was informed about the spin-off Echo (2024) midway through filming Hawkeye; she was expected to reprise her role in Echo with the reveal of its development in March 2021, which was confirmed with the series' official announcement in November of the same year, during Disney+ Day. Additionally, Besaw reprised her role as a young Maya in Echo.

=== Characterization ===
Bert and Bertie described the version of Maya seen in Hawkeye as "[having] been born of losing her father, and she reacts to things very emotionally and very in the moment". They said that Maya's life "became about revenge for her father's death" and noted how she had "spent her life driven by that moment when she loses him". On the set of Hawkeye, actors Jeremy Renner (who portrays Clint Barton / Hawkeye in the MCU) and Hailee Steinfeld (Kate Bishop) used ASL to communicate with Cox. Regarding this, the actress commented, "I thought it was sweet of them putting in efforts to learn basic ASL to communicate with me. It means a lot to me as a Deaf person". Marvel Studios also hired deaf consultants and interpreters, even creating new terms in ASL to refer to characters from the MCU. Cox expressed her pride in the portrayal of Maya in the MCU, noting the strong support from the deaf community. She emphasized the significance of authentic representation, stating that "most of the time it's hearing people that take these roles, but finally authentic representation is here".

The character's portrayal in Echo further connects Maya's personal story to her Choctaw identity, family history, and return to Oklahoma. Marvel described the series as focusing on Maya being forced to confront her family, legacy, and heritage after returning home. The Choctaw Nation of Oklahoma stated that Choctaw historians, language experts, and cultural advisers were involved in conversations about how Choctaw people would be portrayed in the series. Entertainment Weekly also reported that the miniseries received a Choctaw language dub, which was developed through collaboration with the Choctaw Nation and connected to the show's emphasis on Maya's Native background.

The series also uses Maya's relationships with her family and community to distinguish her characterization from her earlier role in Hawkeye. Rather than focusing only on revenge, Echo presents Maya's return home as a way to explore how she responds to grief, belonging, and cultural inheritance. Sydney Freeland said that Maya's journey in the series is shaped by her need to reconnect with her family and community after distancing herself from them. The series' focus on Maya's ancestors, relatives, and Oklahoma hometown also connects her superhero identity to Choctaw history and community rather than presenting her powers as separate from her cultural background.

It's not just a suit, it's a war record. It's a unique and symbolic costume and represents Maya coming into her own and accepting her spot in her real family. It is her saying, 'I am Maya Lopez,' and I echo the powers of the ancestors not just in my kickass abilities, but in the way I dress, the way I braid my hair and down to the details on my prosthetic leg.

— Echo executive producer Richie Palmer on Maya Lopez's final costume and look in the series.

Echo explores the consequences of Maya's actions in Hawkeye and reveals her origin story. Echo executive producer Richie Palmer said that Maya's journey in the miniseries involves reconciling with her past and her cultural roots. Initially resistant to these connections, Maya eventually embraces them, which leads to the development of new powers over the course of the series. During the production of Echo, Cox used a vibration device controlled by an interpreter to signal when other actors had completed their lines. Echo stunt coordinator Mark Scizak was able to incorporate Cox's prosthetic leg into her fights, with Scizak describing Maya's fighting style as "a very grounded mix of MMA and a bunch of martial arts". Maya's hero suit in Echo was designed alongside Choctaw artists, who made sure it represented their people and still provided a "powerful reveal" upon its debut towards the end of the series. Cox explained that it features symbolism for happiness and power from Choctaw culture, along with bead work and gems that are meant to represent the skin from a western diamondback rattlesnake, "a very power animal" respected by the Choctaw.

=== Differences from the comics ===
Maya's Indigeneity is reimagined for the MCU, having her be a member of the Choctaw tribe in Oklahoma rather than being from the Blackfeet Nation in Montana as in the comics. Unlike in the comics, she is not a love interest for either Clint Barton / Hawkeye or Matt Murdock / Daredevil, but rather an adversary for both. In the MCU, Maya does not become the vigilante Ronin, a mantle that the character was the first to wield in the comics. Furthermore, her MCU counterpart diverges from the comics as she faces Kate Bishop / Hawkeye, a character with whom she had little interaction in the Marvel Universe. In the comics, Maya is consistently drawn with a white handprint painted on her face, while in the MCU she does not, although the character is shown with a bloody handprint on her face in a scene from Hawkeye.

Maya's abilities also differ between the two versions. In the comics, Maya does not demonstrate supernatural abilities, but is a proficient fighter. For example, she can replicate the fighting abilities of anyone she observes perfectly; the MCU version of Maya does not possess this ability, with Echo director and executive producer Sydney Freeland finding it "kind of lame". In the MCU, Maya's Choctaw heritage is acknowledged as the source of her superhuman powers. She is notably able to call on the strength of her ancestors, communicate with them, and heal mental scars. Furthermore, Maya's code name, Echo, does not reference her ability to mimic movements, but rather emphasizes the idea of her ancestors' strengths resonating through her into the present day.

== Fictional character biography ==
=== Early life ===
In 2007, Maya Lopez is caught in a car accident with her mother Taloa, after criminals cut their car's brakes. After losing both her right leg and her mother in the accident, she moves from Tamaha, Oklahoma to New York City with her father William, whom Maya's grandmother Chula blames for the death of her daughter. William becomes a commander of the Tracksuit Mafia while his employer, crime lord Wilson Fisk, becomes Maya's adoptive uncle. Years later, Maya witnesses the vigilante Ronin assault the Tracksuit Mafia and kill William. Fisk arranges for Maya to work under him, promising to find William's killer. During a mission for Fisk, Maya is attacked by the vigilante Daredevil but fights him to a draw, which impresses Fisk.

=== Hawkeye ===
By 2024, Maya has taken over her father's old position as the commander of the Tracksuit Mafia and continues her search for William's killer. Her associates mistake Kate Bishop for Ronin due to her wearing his suit, and capture her along with Clint Barton. Upon meeting the two, Maya acknowledges that Bishop is not the real Ronin. Maya fights Barton and Bishop, and the two vigilantes manage to escape the Tracksuit Mafia after a car chase. Later, Maya confronts the pair again on the roof of a building near her apartment, but is injured by Bishop and forced to retreat. Maya battles Barton and Bishop, and the two vigilantes manage to escape the Tracksuit Mafia after a car chase. Later, Maya confronts the pair once more on the roof of a building near her apartment, but is injured by Bishop, forcing her to retreat.

Later, Maya receives a text message from Ronin, asking her to come alone to the auto shop where he killed her father. There, the two fight, and in the midst of it, Ronin unmasks himself as Barton and attempts to convince Maya to let go of her vendetta and reveals that an informant working for Fisk wanted William dead, but Maya initially disbelieves him. Bishop arrives to help Barton escape, while Maya becomes suspicious of her fellow gang member Kazimierz "Kazi" Kazimierczak, who was absent on the night of her father's death. Realizing that she has been played with, Maya confronts Kazi and Fisk, killing the former and shooting the latter in the head, though Fisk survives without Maya knowing.

=== Echo ===
Five months later, Lopez flees to her hometown of Tamaha after being hunted down and driven out of New York by Fisk's men. There, she is reunited with Chula, as well as other family members, including her uncle Henry "Black Crow" Lopez, her cousins Bonnie and Biscuits, and Skully, whom she considers a grandfather figure. Maya intends to dismantle Fisk's operations in order to seize control of his empire, though she later abandons the idea. At the same time, Fisk travels to Tamaha to make peace with Maya and invite her back to his operation. Maya rejects Fisk's invitation, and he attempts to assassinate her family in retaliation. During their confrontation, Maya awakens superhuman powers and takes the name Echo. She attempts to use her newfound powers to heal Fisk's pain, but he flees their encounter due to his heightened emotional state. Later, Maya bids farewell to her family before leaving Tamaha.

== Reception ==
=== Critical response ===
The character of Maya Lopez received praise from various critics. Matt Purslow of IGN highlighted that her addition brings complexity to Hawkeye. Kevin Pantoja of Screen Rant found her backstory sympathetic and admired her as a proud deaf woman. Louise Griffin of Radio Times described Maya as "compelling" and deemed her interesting enough to warrant the creation of Echo. Ethan Anderton of SlashFilm also her "compelling" and "unique," noting that her deafness offers a fresh perspective rarely depicted on television, particularly in Echo. Laura Hood of The Conversation said Maya embodies independence and strength and positioned her as a role model for the deaf and disabled community in the miniseries.

For her performance in the MCU, Cox was complimented by multiple critics. Alison Stine of Salon.com described Cox as "stunning" in Hawkeye. Charles Pulliam-Moore of The Verge highlighted her "formidable presence" in the series, noting her more dynamic portrayal of Maya in Echo. Richard Fink of MovieWeb asserted that while Cox made an impression in Hawkeye, she delivers a "great lead performance" in Echo. Ed Power of The Telegraph also commended her as an "excellent lead" in the miniseries. Adam Barnhardt of ComicBook.com stated that Cox seamlessly becomes one with the character, calling her performance "worthy of applause". Cassondra Feltus of Black Girl Nerds noted that Cox delivers a beautifully nuanced performance, portraying Maya as a culturally rich and formidable character.

=== Impact ===
Cox became the first Native American actress to lead a Marvel television series with Echo. Maya Lopez is the second deaf character in the MCU, following Lauren Ridloff's character Makkari in the film Eternals (2021). Kate Nelson of Teen Vogue underlined Cox's significant impact as an actress, emphasizing her role in bringing Indigenous, deaf, and disability representation to television in an unprecedented way. Jamie Jirak of ComicBook.com noted that Cox quickly rose to fame after her appearance in Hawkeye. George Marston of Newsarama highlighted Maya's breakout popularity following Hawkeye. Alexandra Moroca of Comic Book Resources attributed Maya's appeal to the character's strength and determination.

Several commentators also discussed Echo in terms of its broader representational impact. Dominic Patten of Deadline Hollywood described the series as a major Indigenous-led entry in the Marvel Cinematic Universe and connected its importance to the show's Native cast and creative team. Rotten Tomatoes' roundup of early reviews also highlighted critics who praised the series for Native collaboration, Indigenous storytelling, and Cox's performance as Maya. Other reviews were more mixed, praising the cultural representation and action sequences while criticizing the series' pacing and conclusion.

Native media and tribal sources also described Echo as significant because of its emphasis on Choctaw representation. Native News Online reported that the series centered a deaf Choctaw superhero and focused on Maya's efforts to process her father's death while reconnecting with her Indigenous roots and family. Choctaw Nation Chief Gary Batton also described the tribe as proud of its involvement in the series, noting that Echo follows a deaf Choctaw superhero who protects her Oklahoma family after separating from a crime syndicate.

=== Accolades ===
Cox's performance in Echo was an honorable mention for TVLine Performer of the Week for the week ending January 13, 2024, with Keisha Hatchett stating Cox "delivered her best performance" in the series' finale episode where she "unleashed the Choctaw warrior within", calling it "empowering to see her cry while speaking with her mother's spirit, her tear-filled eyes packing a harder punch than the physical blows in the scenes that followed". Cox was also nominated for Best Actress in a Limited Series or TV Movie at the 4th Astra TV Awards.

== In other media ==
- In 2021, Netmarble released the Hawkeye incarnation of Maya Lopez in the video game Marvel Future Fight (2015).
- In 2024, Funko released a Maya Lopez Funko Pop! figure based on Echo.

== See also ==
- Characters of the Marvel Cinematic Universe
