= Tamaha, Oklahoma =

- Town
- Location within Oklahoma
- Coordinates: 35°23′51″N 94°59′15″W
- Country: United States
- State: Oklahoma
- County: Haskell

Area
  - Total: 6.45 sq mi (16.71 km^{2})
  - Land: 6.43 sq mi (16.65 km^{2})
  - Water: 0.023 sq mi (0.06 km^{2})
- Elevation: 479 ft (146 m)

Population (2020)
  - Total: 152
  - Density: 23.6/sq mi (9.13/km^{2})
- Time zone: UTC-6 (Central (CST))
  - Summer (DST): UTC-5 (CDT)
- ZIP code: 74462
- Area codes: 539/918
- FIPS code: 40-72400
- GNIS feature ID: 2413365

Tamaha is a town in Haskell County, Oklahoma, United States. The population was 152 at the time of the 2020 United States census. Tamaha is a Choctaw word meaning "town."

== Geography ==
Tamaha is located on the banks of the Arkansas River, 13 miles (21 km) north northeast of Stigler and 6 miles (9.7 km) south of Vian.

According to the United States Census Bureau, the town has a total area of 6.4 square miles (17 km^{2}), of which 6.4 square miles (17 km^{2}) is land and 0.16% is water.

== History ==
Tamaha began as a riverboat landing on the Arkansas River in the 1830s. At the time of its founding, Tamaha was located in the Moshulatubbee District of the Choctaw Nation. Initially, the community was called Pleasant Bluff, after a nearby geographic feature. During the Civil War, the Union steamboat J. R. Williams was ambushed next to the town while it carried supplies for the Union army at Fort Gibson in Indian Territory from Fort Smith, Arkansas. It happened that, on June 15, 1864, Confederate forces under Colonel Stand Watie attacked with cannon and small arms fire as the ship negotiated a bend at Pleasant Bluff. The ship was crippled and ran aground, where the Confederates captured it. According to the Encyclopedia of Oklahoma History and Culture, the rusted skeleton of the steamer remains where it was grounded.

The town grew slowly after the Civil War. The name changed to Tamaha in 1884, when a post office was established. It had a population of 237 in 1900, increasing to 501 in 1920. However, riverboat traffic, the major source of business, ceased in 1912. Two fires, one in 1919 and the other in 1930, destroyed much of the town. The population fell to 202 in 1930 and declined to its historic low of 80 in 1960. Most of the former residents moved to the nearby town of Stigler. The post office closed in 1954. In the 21st century, the main source of business is travel by vacationers, attracted by the nearby Robert S. Kerr Reservoir. The only physical link to the town's past is the Tamaha Jail and Ferry Landing, which is included on the National Register of Historic Places listings in Haskell County, Oklahoma (NR 80003266).

== Demographics ==
Historical population
| Census | Pop. | Note | %± |
|---|---|---|---|
| 1900 | 237 | | — |
| 1910 | 498 | | 110.1% |
| 1920 | 501 | | 0.6% |
| 1930 | 202 | | −59.7% |
| 1940 | 245 | | 21.3% |
| 1950 | 117 | | −52.2% |
| 1960 | 80 | | −31.6% |
| 1970 | 83 | | 3.8% |
| 1980 | 145 | | 74.7% |
| 1990 | 188 | | 29.7% |
| 2000 | 372 | | 97.9% |
| 2010 | 176 | | −52.7% |
| 2020 | 152 | | −13.6% |
U.S. Decennial Census

=== 2020 census ===
As of the 2020 census, Tamaha had a population of 152. The median age was 51.7 years. 18.4% of residents were under the age of 18 and 28.3% of residents were 65 years of age or older. For every 100 females there were 120.3 males, and for every 100 females age 18 and over there were 125.5 males age 18 and over.

0.0% of residents lived in urban areas, while 100.0% lived in rural areas.

There were 71 households in Tamaha, of which 28.2% had children under the age of 18 living in them. Of all households, 56.3% were married-couple households, 25.4% were households with a male householder and no spouse or partner present, and 11.3% were households with a female householder and no spouse or partner present. About 22.5% of all households were made up of individuals and 14.1% had someone living alone who was 65 years of age or older.

There were 99 housing units, of which 28.3% were vacant. The homeowner vacancy rate was 0.0% and the rental vacancy rate was 0.0%.

Racial composition as of the 2020 census
| Race | Number | Percent |
|---|---|---|
| White | 111 | 73.0% |
| Black or African American | 0 | 0.0% |
| American Indian and Alaska Native | 21 | 13.8% |
| Asian | 0 | 0.0% |
| Native Hawaiian and Other Pacific Islander | 0 | 0.0% |
| Some other race | 4 | 2.6% |
| Two or more races | 16 | 10.5% |
| Hispanic or Latino (of any race) | 7 | 4.6% |

=== 2000 census ===
As of the census of 2000, there were 198 people, 73 households, and 54 families residing in the town. The population density was 30.8 inhabitants per square mile (11.9/km^{2}). There were 109 housing units at an average density of 17.0 per square mile (6.6/km^{2}). The racial makeup of the town was 84.34% White, 8.59% Native American, and 7.07% from two or more races.

There were 73 households, out of which 23.3% had children under the age of 18 living with them, 64.4% were married couples living together, 6.8% had a female householder with no husband present, and 24.7% were non-families. 20.5% of all households were made up of individuals, and 11.0% had someone living alone who was 65 years of age or older. The average household size was 2.71 and the average family size was 3.16.

In the town, the population was spread out, with 24.7% under the age of 18, 4.0% from 18 to 24, 21.2% from 25 to 44, 29.8% from 45 to 64, and 20.2% who were 65 years of age or older. The median age was 44 years. For every 100 females, there were 112.9 males. For every 100 females age 18 and over, there were 109.9 males.

The median income for a household in the town was $29,250, and the median income for a family was $35,938. Males had a median income of $27,500 versus $16,563 for females. The per capita income for the town was $11,628. About 4.3% of families and 8.9% of the population were below the poverty line, including none of those under the age of eighteen and 22.6% of those 65 or over.

== In popular culture ==
Tamaha is the setting for the 2024 Marvel television miniseries Echo, although actual filming took place in Georgia.
