= Echo (miniseries) =

2024 Marvel Studios television miniseries

- Genre: Action-adventure; Crime; Superhero
- Based on: Marvel Comics
- Starring: Alaqua Cox; Chaske Spencer; Tantoo Cardinal; Charlie Cox; Devery Jacobs; Zahn McClarnon; Cody Lightning; Graham Greene; Vincent D'Onofrio
- Music by: Dave Porter
- Opening theme: "Burning" by Yeah Yeah Yeahs
- Country of origin: United States
- Original languages: English; American Sign Language; Choctaw
- No. of seasons: 1
- No. of episodes: 5

Production
- Executive producers: Kevin Feige; Stephen Broussard; Louis D'Esposito; Brad Winderbaum; Victoria Alonso; Richie Palmer; Jason Gavin; Marion Dayre; Sydney Freeland
- Production location: Atlanta metropolitan area
- Cinematography: Kira Kelly; Magdalena Górka
- Editors: Shelby Hall; Amelia Allwarden; Joel T. Pashby; Chris McCaleb; Tania Goding
- Running time: 37–51 minutes
- Production company: Marvel Studios
- Budget: $40 million

Original release
- Network: Disney+; Hulu
- Release: January 9, 2024

Related
- Hawkeye; Daredevil: Born Again; Marvel Cinematic Universe television series

Echo is an American television miniseries created for the streaming service Disney+, based on Marvel Comics featuring the character of the same name. A spin-off from the series Hawkeye (2021), it is the 10th television series in the Marvel Cinematic Universe (MCU) produced by Marvel Studios, sharing continuity with the films of the franchise. It sees Maya Lopez return to her hometown where she must come to terms with her past, reconnect with her Native American roots, and embrace her family and community. Marion Dayre and Amy Rardin serve as head writers and Sydney Freeland leads the directing team.

Alaqua Cox reprises her role as Maya Lopez / Echo from Hawkeye, with Chaske Spencer, Tantoo Cardinal, Charlie Cox, Devery Jacobs, Zahn McClarnon, Cody Lightning, Graham Greene, and Vincent D'Onofrio also starring. Development of the spin-off began by March 2021, when Alaqua Cox was confirmed to be returning and Etan and Emily Cohen were attached as head writers. The series was formally announced in November 2021, when Dayre was revealed to be serving as head writer, with Freeland set to direct by March 2022. Filming took place from late April to late August 2022, in the Atlanta metropolitan area including Atlanta, Peachtree City, Social Circle, and Grantville, Georgia. In May 2022, Marvel revealed further cast members and that Catriona McKenzie would also direct for the series, while Rardin's involvement was revealed in September.

Echo was released in its entirety simultaneously on Disney+ and Hulu on January 9, 2024, consisting of five episodes. It is Marvel Studios' first television release to debut on Hulu and to receive a TV-MA rating. It is part of Phase Five of the MCU and the first series under the "Marvel Spotlight" banner. The series received generally positive reviews from critics.

== Premise ==
Five months after the events of Hawkeye (2021), Maya Lopez is being pursued by Wilson Fisk's organization, leading her to return to her hometown in Oklahoma, where she must come to terms with her past, reconnect with her Native American roots, and embrace her family and community.

== Cast and characters ==
- Alaqua Cox as Maya Lopez / Echo:
  A deaf Native American Choctaw and the former leader of the Tracksuit Mafia, a criminal gang working for Wilson Fisk. Director and executive producer Sydney Freeland noted that Maya is in "a very vulnerable, emotional place" and has "all this bottled-up emotion and rage and feeling inside of her", which Fisk is able to exploit. Maya does not have the ability to perfectly copy another person's movements from the comics, which Freeland felt was "kind of lame". Stunt coordinator Mark Scizak was able to incorporate Cox's prosthetic leg into her fights, with Scizak describing Maya's fighting style as "a very grounded mix of MMA and a bunch of martial arts". Darnell Besaw, Cox's cousin, portrays a young Maya Lopez.
- Chaske Spencer as Henry "Black Crow" Lopez:
  Maya's uncle and William's brother, who owns a local roller-skating rink and is still connected to Fisk's criminal empire. Spencer said Henry "feels guilty" that William died and Maya's return makes him face things he is not ready to yet.
- Tantoo Cardinal as Chula:
  Maya's estranged grandmother. Cardinal explained that at the start of the series, the two's relationship "is pretty fractured and they are not in a good place" given Chula's anger following the death of her daughter, Maya's mother, which led to Maya and her father leaving. Isabella Madrigal portrays a young Chula.
- Charlie Cox as Matt Murdock / Daredevil:
  A blind lawyer with superhuman senses from Hell's Kitchen who leads a double life as a masked vigilante. Daredevil appears in a flashback sequence where he fights Maya while she is on an early assignment for Fisk. Executive producer Richie Palmer explained that Daredevil's inclusion was done in a way that the creatives hoped would feel like it was part of his story that had been established in Marvel Television's Netflix series, though still accessible for viewers who had not seen those series. He said, "we just wanted to make sure that it honored what came before it, but hopefully pushed it forward also" and helped lead into the Disney+ series Daredevil: Born Again (2025-present). It was previously reported that the character's appearance in the series would see him searching for a former ally, which was reported to be Jessica Jones.
- Devery Jacobs as Bonnie:
  A "resilient and strong willed" person who is a child of deaf adults (CODA), Maya's estranged cousin, and an EMT. She "took it hard" when Maya first left given they were so close, and is hopeful to rekindle that relationship once she returns. Jacobs previously voiced Kahhori in the second season of Marvel Studios Animation's What If...? (2023), which she called a "coincidence" that she was part of two Marvel Studios projects and noting the two characters were not related. Wren Zhawenim Gotts portrays a young Bonnie.
- Zahn McClarnon as William Lopez: Maya's deceased father and a former commander of the Tracksuit Mafia.
- Cody Lightning as Biscuits:
  Maya's "well-meaning" cousin, who is "fun-loving and good natured". Lightning said that Biscuits becomes Maya's "sidekick who provides some comic relief for her", calling him "a big earnest puppy dog" who has a strong loyalty to family.
- Graham Greene as Skully: A grandfather-figure to Maya, who owns the town pawn shop. Unlike other members of Maya's estranged family, Skully is more willing to find a way forward in their relationship.
- Vincent D'Onofrio as Wilson Fisk / Kingpin:
  A crime lord in New York who is Maya's adoptive uncle and the man responsible for her father's death. After he was shot by Maya during the events of Hawkeye (2021), Fisk begins to wear an eyepatch on one eye, an homage to a point in the comics where he was blinded in both eyes. Despite being shot by Maya, D'Onofrio noted that Fisk is working hard to get her back in his life, saying the series shows the two in a "very father-daughter trepidatious period". Palmer enjoyed being able to see a different side of the character's "emotionality" in the series, since he was "humbled" by Maya at the end of Hawkeye, which made him a "bit of a changed man". D'Onofrio believed he portrayed the character in a way that it elicited the same "uneasy" feelings about him as he did in his portrayal on the Marvel Netflix series Daredevil (2015–2018), and wanted to show that he can "care for people in a real way", which enhances Fisk's intrigue and scariness. When asked if Fisk was being set up as the Thanos of the MCU's street-level projects, executive producer Brad Winderbaum agreed, calling the series a "crucial chapter" in the character's journey, and that Echo would "set the stage in some remarkable ways" for his next appearances. At the end of the series, when Maya uses her powers on Fisk to try to heal his childhood trauma, D'Onofrio believed this had "enlightened" Fisk, rather than changed him, which leads him to consider running as New York City's mayor to amass more power. After gaining 40 pounds (18 kg) for the role in Daredevil, D'Onofrio chose to wear a fat suit for Echo, having chosen to do this with his appearance in Hawkeye. D'Onofrio thought the suit had progressed with modern technology to give him a more realistic look while also being lighter to wear, which allowed him to not have to gain the weight.

Additionally, Katarina Ziervogel portrays Taloa, Maya's mother. Julia Jones, Morningstar Angeline, and Dannie McCallum appear, in vignettes and flashes, as Maya's ancestors Chafa, Lowak, and Tuklo: per variations of the Choctaw origin story, Chafa was the first Choctaw, helping her people emerge to the world from a cave-in at Nanih Waiya; Lowak was a Choctaw tribeswoman in 1200 who competed in a game of Choctaw Stickball; and Tuklo was the first female Lighthorseman. Andrew Howard, who previously portrayed Luther Banks in Agents of S.H.I.E.L.D. (2013–2020), recurs as Zane, one of the leaders of the Black Knife Cartel who is loyal to Fisk. Thomas E. Sullivan, who previously portrayed Nathaniel Malick in Agents of S.H.I.E.L.D., appears as Victor "Vickie" Tyson, an employee at Henry's bowling rink. Jeremy Renner appears as Clint Barton / Ronin in the first episode through archive footage from Hawkeye, while Richie Palmer Sr. and ML Gemmill, respectively, voice Fisk's parents Bill and Marlene Fisk in the final episode, replacing Domenick Lombardozzi and Angela Reed, who portrayed the characters in Daredevil. Pat Kiernan and Errol Louis portray themselves in the mid-credits scene of "Maya".

== Episodes ==
No.	Title	Directed by	Written by	Original release date
1	"Chafa"	Sydney Freeland	Marion Dayre and Josh Feldman & Steven Paul Judd and Ken Kristensen	January 9, 2024
A flashback reveals the origins of the Choctaw, with Chafa emerging as a human from under the earth at Nanih Waiya. In 2007, Maya Lopez is in a car accident with her mother Taloa, after criminals cut their car's brakes. After losing both her leg and her mother in the accident, she moves from Tamaha, Oklahoma to New York City with her father William, whom Maya's grandmother Chula blames for the death of her daughter. William becomes a commander of the Tracksuit Mafia while his employer Wilson Fisk becomes Maya's adoptive uncle. Years later, Maya witnesses Clint Barton / Ronin assault the Tracksuit Mafia and kill William. (Note: As depicted in the Hawkeye episode "Echoes" (2021)) Fisk arranges for Maya to work under him, promising to find William's killer. During a mission for Fisk, Maya is attacked by Daredevil but fights him to a draw, which impresses Fisk. In December 2024, Maya encounters Barton and, after learning Fisk arranged William's death by tipping off Barton, avenges her father by shooting Fisk in the eye. (Note: As depicted in the Hawkeye episode "So This Is Christmas?" (2021)) Five months later, Maya returns to Tamaha and meets with her cousin, Biscuits, and her uncle, Henry. She convinces them to not let anyone else know of her presence. Maya asks Henry to help her dismantle Fisk's operations so she can take over his empire, but Henry refuses, not wanting to endanger his family. Elsewhere, Fisk, who had survived, recovers from his injury in a hospital.
2	"Lowak"	Sydney Freeland	Story by : Marion Dayre & Ken Kristensen and Josh Feldman & Steven Paul Judd and Rebecca Roanhorse & Bobby Wilson; Teleplay by : Marion Dayre and Josh Feldman & Steven Paul Judd and Ellen Morton	January 9, 2024
In a flashback to Alabama in 1200 AD, Lowak is participating in a game of Choctaw Stickball against a Cherokee tribe. When Lowak's team is close to winning, the opposing side send out a formidable warrior who helps to even the score. Lowak is desperate to avoid exile for her team if they should lose and receives a vision during an intense melee. With her hands glowing, Lowak breaks out of the melee with the ball and secures victory for her tribe. Maya enlists Biscuits' help in hijacking a cargo train guarded by Fisk's men. She locates a munitions container, and plants a homemade bomb inside one of the crates. As she attempts to get off, her prosthetic leg becomes stuck in a coupling. Maya receives a vision of her ancestors, then manages to push the coupling off to free her leg after her hands begin to glow. The shipment arrives at one of Fisk's armories in New York. Black Knife Cartel leader Zane dispatches men to unload the crate, triggering Maya's bomb which destroys the facility. Maya later gets a new prosthetic leg from Skully, who reveals that one of the women in Maya's vision was Chafa, the first Choctaw. Henry learns about the munitions explosion and later confronts Maya, warning her to stop these attacks before she ends up hurting people close to her, but she dismisses this. Meanwhile, Chula receives word that Maya is in town, and Bonnie learns of Maya's return in Tamaha from Biscuits. Maya refuses to interact with either of them.
3	"Tuklo"	Catriona McKenzie	Story by : Ken Kristensen and Jason Gavin and Shoshannah Stern; Teleplay by : Marion Dayre and Ken Kristensen	January 9, 2024
In a flashback to the late 1800s, Tuklo practices shooting with her father, one of the Lighthorsemen. Despite wanting to be a lighthorseman, her father forbids this due to her gender. Tuklo's father rides out to confront some local criminals while Tuklo braids her hair like a Choctaw warrior. She receives a vision of Chafa and Lowak, and her hands begin to glow. The criminals ambush Tuklo's father, but she hears the attack and arrives in time to save him and his group. Skully is visited by Chula, who encourages her to reach out to Maya. Maya receives a sudden vision of Chafa, Lowak and Tuklo, and is captured by Henry's employee, Vickie. Vickie is revealed to be in allegiance with Fisk, having tipped off the organization to Maya's location. He holds both Maya and Henry hostage at Henry's skating rink, and captures Bonnie after she shows up to visit Henry. Zane arrives for Maya, and betrays and kills Vickie. After a confrontation with Bonnie over her absence, Maya escapes and attacks Zane's enforcers. Zane threatens Bonnie and Henry and holds Maya at gunpoint as he prepares to shoot her and Henry. After receiving a phone call, Zane and his men leave. Maya sends Bonnie away, promising to reconcile with her later. Maya learns from Henry that Fisk is still alive, and Henry promises to help her. Skully gives Maya a new look for her prosthetic. On her way out of town, Maya returns home and is confronted by Fisk.
4	"Taloa"	Sydney Freeland	Ken Kristensen and Josh Feldman & Chantelle M. Wells	January 9, 2024
In 2008, a young Maya is mocked by an ice cream vendor, who fails to understand her request for ice cream as he doesn't know that she's deaf. An enraged Fisk retaliates by brutally attacking the ice cream vendor. Although Maya witnesses this, she kicks the ice cream vendor as payback for his cruelty, showing no remorse towards him. Several years later, Maya is about to begin working for Fisk when he offers a final lesson – they can only trust one another. While they finish their shared dinner, Fisk's ASL translator is dismissed and soon killed. Fisk gives Maya an augmented reality contact lens so that they can communicate without an ASL interpreter. Fisk tells her that he will give her his criminal empire if she agrees to return with him to New York, giving her one day to decide. Maya shares this with Henry, but receives an abrupt vision of her ancestors; at the Choctaw Powwow festival grounds, Chula receives the same vision. Henry takes Maya to see Chula, who tells her that their ancestors help them when they need it most, recounting a vision that she received when giving birth to Maya's mother. Maya leaves in anger, feeling abandoned by Chula as a child. Chula later begins to work on a special garment. That night, Maya goes to Fisk's hotel with the intention of killing him. Revealing to her that he killed his father after seeing him beat his mother, (Note: As depicted in the Daredevil episode "Shadows in the Glass" (2015)) Fisk tells her to make good on her threat if that is what she needs, but she rejects this. He repeats his invitation to join her in New York, but is enraged to find out the next morning that Maya has left Tamaha without him.
5	"Maya"	Sydney Freeland	Amy Rardin and Steven Paul Judd & Ellen Morton and Chantelle M. Wells	January 9, 2024
In a flashback to her childhood, Maya hits a woodpecker with a slingshot. Taloa reprimands Maya for hurting an innocent life, and, with her hands glowing, heals the woodpecker. Later, the two release it back into the wild. Biscuits messages Maya that Chula and Bonnie are missing, and she returns to Tamaha. She quickly visits Chula's home, and is met by a vision of her mother, Taloa. Taloa tells her that she is the embodiment of their people's legacy, and that this legacy will echo through her actions. The vision ends, revealing Chula's finished garment. At the Choctaw Powwow Festival, Maya locates Fisk, who has kidnapped Chula and Bonnie, and threatens to kill her entire family for betraying him. Biscuits incapacitates Fisk's men with a monster truck, while Henry kills Zane. Maya shares her Choctaw powers with Chula and Bonnie, who overpower Fisk's men. Using her powers, Maya takes Fisk to the memory of his father beating his mother, in an effort to heal his trauma and help him let go of his anger. Returning to reality, an outraged Fisk demands to know what she did to him, and leaves the festival before the police arrive. The next day, Maya says goodbye to her family before leaving Tamaha. In a mid-credits scene, Fisk is on his airplane watching with interest a news story about the lack of front-runners in the New York mayoral elections.

== Production ==
=== Development ===
In December 2020, deaf and amputee newcomer Alaqua Cox was announced as having been cast as the Marvel Comics character Maya Lopez / Echo in Marvel Studios' Disney+ series Hawkeye (2021). By March 2021, Marvel Studios was in early development on a spin-off from Hawkeye centered on Cox's Lopez for Disney+, with Etan Cohen and Emily Cohen set to write and executive produce. During the Disney+ Day event in November 2021, the series was officially announced as Echo, and Marion Dayre was serving as head writer by then instead of the Cohens. Amy Rardin would also join the series to serve as head writer alongside Dayre. Bert & Bertie, who directed the Hawkeye episode "Echoes" in which Lopez is introduced, did not believe they would be involved with the spin-off series and felt it would be appropriate for someone in the Native American community to further tell the character's story. In March 2022, Sydney Freeland shared a casting call on her Instagram page, indicating her involvement in the series as a director. Marvel Studios confirmed Freeland as a director in May, while also announcing that Catriona McKenzie would also direct for the series. Freeland directed all episodes except the third, which was directed by McKenzie. Marvel Studios' Kevin Feige, Stephen Broussard, Louis D'Esposito, Brad Winderbaum, Victoria Alonso, and Richie Palmer serve as executive producers along with Dayre, Jason Gavin, and Freeland, while Rardin is a co-executive producer. The series consists of five episodes, which reportedly had a budget of $40 million, the lowest for a Marvel Studios series at the time of its release.

=== Writing ===
A writers' room for the series had been formed by the time development of the project was revealed in March 2021. In addition to Dayre and Rardin, writers for the series include Josh Feldman, Steven P. Judd, Ken Kristensen, Rebecca Roanhorse, Bobby Wilson, Ellen Morton, Jason Gavin, Shoshannah Stern, and Chantelle Wells. In November 2021, Dayre indicated that Dara Resnik, Jessica Mecklenburg, Kaitlyn Jeffers, and Paloma Lamb would also be writers on the series, though they were not credited for any episodes. At least two episodes had been written by mid-February 2022, while writing for the other episodes was still continuing. Marvel said the series would explore the consequences of Lopez's actions in Hawkeye and reveal her origin story. Lopez's Indigeneity is reimagined for the MCU, having her be a member of the Choctaw tribe in Oklahoma rather than being from the Blackfeet Nation as in the comics. Freeland explained that the visuals in the comics "amounted to a 'hodgepodge' of imagery that made for a 'muddied' and ultimately inauthentic backstory for the character". She described the series as an exploration of trauma. Judd, who is Choctaw, helped bring authenticity to the writing of the series. The first episode employs flashbacks to help explain Lopez's backstory as well as including her appearances on Hawkeye, which is "touch[ed] on in a way that you just know what you need to know upfront". The series is set five months after Hawkeye, in May 2025. Location manager Ryan Schaetzle said the story would focus on a small town. Supervising producer Eleena Khamedoost said setting Echo in Tamaha, Oklahoma was "attractive" as it allowed the writers to make it a character in the series, and "showcase a world we have never seen in the MCU".

Borys Kit of The Hollywood Reporter described Echo as "a grounded crime story", while his colleague Aaron Couch compared its tone and footage to Daredevil (2015–2018), Breaking Bad (2008–2013), and John Wick (2014), calling it "Marvel's version of a cable drama rather than an MCU streaming series". The series is the first Marvel Studios project to receive a TV-MA rating, which executive producer Brad Winderbaum called "a new direction for the [Marvel Studios] brand". Freeland added that this rating allowed the characters to be shown as "people", ones that "bleed, they die, they get killed and there are real consequences". Freeland drew inspiration from Daredevil and The Punisher (2017–2019). Winderbaum and Freeland noted that the series would have "street-level stakes" that would be less focused on the larger MCU narrative and "cosmic consequences", with Freeland adding it was "not the fate of the universe" but "the fate of family". Much of the series is set after the events of Hawkeye while also exploring a "seismic event" in Lopez's family history and how that leads her towards Wilson Fisk / Kingpin. Family is one of the main themes of the series, specifically how it is defined, with a spectrum of family dynamics shown in the series: Fisk and Lopez's conditional, "unhealthy family relationship" on one side, and Lopez's biological family on another. Freeland said, at the start of Echo, Lopez has "one definition of family, and over the course of the show we're going to challenge that definition and see if she's able to see things in a different way". Echo is initially portrayed as a villain in the comics, something Freeland was drawn to and Marvel Studios encouraged her to further explore and "push the envelope" with.

Echo references Fisk's murder of his father, Bill Fisk, as seen in Daredevil, though viewers noted the type of hammer Fisk used was changed for Echo. D'Onofrio acknowledged Echo had some discrepancies with the character's backstory, saying some things would change slightly moving forward to keep the stories interesting and it was more important to align with the tone of the previous Netflix series.

=== Casting ===
Alaqua Cox was expected to reprise her role in the series with the reveal of its development in March 2021, which was confirmed with the series' official announcement in November 2021 for Disney+ Day. By August 2021, casting for the series was underway, with Marvel Studios looking to cast deaf Native American or Latinx women. In April 2022, Vincent D'Onofrio and Charlie Cox were revealed to be involved with the series, reprising their roles as Wilson Fisk / Kingpin and Matt Murdock / Daredevil from prior MCU media. Freeland approached D'Onofrio to appear in Echo, who was excited to return to a darker tone for the character similar to Daredevil opposed to his portrayal in Hawkeye. By the end of the month, Devery Jacobs was cast in an undisclosed role, reported to be a lead of the series named Julie, which Deadline Hollywood described as "resilient and strong willed". In May 2022, Marvel confirmed Jacobs's casting and announced that Chaske Spencer, Tantoo Cardinal, Cody Lightning, and Graham Greene would also star in the series, with Zahn McClarnon reprising his role as Echo's father William Lopez from Hawkeye. Charlie Cox and D'Onofrio were confirmed to be returning for the series in July 2022. In September 2023, a United States Copyright Office filing for the series revealed that Spencer was playing Henry, Cardinal playing Chula, Greene playing Skully, Lightning playing Cousin Biscuits, and Jacobs playing Bonnie.

Andrew Howard, who previously portrayed Luther Banks in Agents of S.H.I.E.L.D. (2013–2020), recurs in the series as Zane, one of Fisk's henchmen. Archive footage of Jeremy Renner as Clint Barton / Ronin from Hawkeye is featured in the first episode, while Richie Palmer Sr. and ML Gemmill respectively voice Fisk's parents Bill and Marlene Fisk in the final episode, replacing Domenick Lombardozzi and Phyllis Somerville, who portrayed the characters in Daredevil. Deaf actress Katarina Ziervogel portrays Maya's mother Taloa.

By April 2022, Marvel Studios was looking to cast background performers and extras, particularly Native Americans, for two waves of filming. The first group of around 30 people would portray a "core group" of townspeople, while background casting for actual powwow dancers and singers occurred to give the series an additional level of authenticity. The series worked with hundreds of Native Americans from all around the country. Freeland revealed that Echo features a number of cameo appearances from other films and series that are in service to Lopez and "have a story motivation behind" their appearance.

=== Design ===
The Choctaw Nation of Oklahoma along with advisers from the woman-led organization IllumiNative were consulted on the representation of Choctaw culture, legends, and history portrayed in the series. The various department heads were able to travel to the Choctaw Nation in Oklahoma to learn more about the language and culture of the Choctaw, as well as experience it first hand while attending a powwow. They worked with Choctaw Chief Gary Batton, Tribal Historic Preservation Officer Dr. Ian Thompson, and executive director of Cultural Services Seth Fairchild. Fairchild said the Choctaw Nation saw Echo as "an opportunity to really lend our voice and culture on a scale that would otherwise not have been possible."

It's not just a suit, it's a war record. It's a unique and symbolic costume and represents Maya coming into her own and accepting her spot in her real family. It is her saying, 'I am Maya Lopez,' and I echo the powers of the ancestors not just in my kickass abilities, but in the way I dress, the way I braid my hair and down to the details on my prosthetic leg.

— Executive producer Richie Palmer on Maya Lopez's final costume and look.

Ambre Wrigley serves as the costume designer for the series, and called it "critical" to be able to collaborate with the Choctaw on the look of the costumes. Wrigley spoke with "at least five different tribal leaders and historians" and employed a group of Choctaw artisans to make costume items. Lopez's hero suit was designed alongside Choctaw artists, who made sure it represented their people and still provided a "powerful reveal" upon its debut towards the end of the series. Cox explained that it features symbolism for happiness and power from Choctaw culture, along with bead work and gems that are meant to represent the skin from a western diamondback rattlesnake, "a very power animal" respected by the Choctaw. Daredevil's costume in the series is a "new take" on his costume from the Netflix series, with the design closer to the one he wore in She-Hulk: Attorney at Law (2022) with more red. The Netflix costume was originally designed by Marvel Studios' head of visual development Ryan Meinerding, who "tweaked" it for Echo to "honor classic Daredevil" and bring the "quintessential" look of the character to this series. Chris Trujillo serves as the production designer. The department heads were able to buy items directly from the Choctaw people, adding to the authenticity.

=== Filming ===
External videos
- This Is Choctaw presents a behind-the-scenes featurette exploring the collaboration with the Choctaw Nation for Echo, YouTube video from Marvel Entertainment's channel

Principal photography began on April 21, 2022, at Trilith Studios in Fayetteville, Georgia, as well as throughout the Atlanta metropolitan area, in Atlanta, with Freeland and McKenzie directing. Cinematographers include Kira Kelly for Freeland's episodes, and Magdalena Górka for McKenzie's episode. The series was filmed using the working titles Grasshopper and Whole Branzino. A traditional Choctaw blessing ceremony was performed before the start of production. Filming was set to occur along the Great Walton Railroad in Social Circle, Georgia in April, as well as in and around Peachtree City, Georgia from late April to late August 2022. Filming was previously expected to begin in February 2022, as well as in early April. Filming establishing shots for two episodes took place in Grantville, Georgia from May 16 to 20, on various streets in the town, the Grantville water tower, and Bonnie Castle. Filming outside Atlanta occurred with the first group of extras around June 1, with the second group for three weeks in July, and with the dancers and singers extras for around two-to-three weeks in July. The powwow set was built on a rural county fairground that Trujillo felt "had this great tone, texture and character". It was initially difficult to find locations in Georgia to double as Oklahoma, but the creatives were able to use their trip to the Choctaw Nation and scout the surrounding areas to gather reference photos and information that helped inform them on locations in Georgia that would work for shooting. Filming occurred over 92 days, and wrapped on August 26, 2022.

Freeland worked to ensure her close-up shots included actors signing, with many on the crew taking American Sign Language classes. They learned that unlike speaking, which conveys text and subtext, signing conveys the text while a person's face convey's the subtext, which changed Freeland's approach to filming Lopez. Douglas Ridloff served as the ASL consultant and a consulting producer, after previously doing so on Hawkeye and Eternals (2021), with the series employing ASL and Indigenous ASL interpreters. Ridloff, who is the husband of Eternals actress Lauren Ridloff, would adjust his translations of English to sign language depending on each character, taking into account things such as what their proficiency should be or familial or regional dialects. For example, Bonnie signs without speaking as she is proficient while the elder characters such as Chula sign slower and use SimCom, which is signing and speaking at the same time. Ridloff was also able to incorporate Plains Indian Sign Language and other Indigenous sign languages that "date back to pre-colonization" into the series.

=== Post-production ===
In May 2023, journalist Jeff Sneider reported that the series was originally filmed as eight episodes and after various production issues, had been found by Feige to be "unreleasable"; discussions were then had about possibly editing what had been filmed into four or six episodes during post-production before it was ultimately decided to reshoot much of the series. The series ultimately consists of five episodes. Due to its grounded story, it was reported as having fewer visual effects compared to Marvel Studios' other series. Editors for the series are Joel Pashby, Chris McCaleb, Amelia Allwarden, Shelby Hall, and Tania Goding.

=== Music ===
External videos
- Dave Porter – Echo (From "Echo"/Audio Only) presents composer Dave Porter's Echo theme, YouTube video from MarvelMusicVevo's channel

By February 2023, Mato Wayuhi was working on the score for the series, but was no longer involved by the end of July or start of August. Dave Porter revealed in December that he was serving as the composer for the series. The title track was released by Hollywood Records and Marvel Music on January 5, 2024, followed by the series' soundtrack album on January 12, 2024. "Burning" by Yeah Yeah Yeahs is heard over the main titles. The soundtrack heavily featured several pre-existing vocal songs, as opposed to prior MCU Disney+ series which traditionally featured original scores.

All music is composed by Dave Porter, except where noted.

Echo (Original Soundtrack)
No.	Title	Length
1.	"Echo" (featuring Brenner Billy, Bryon "Mahli" Billy, Philip L. Billy, Lisa Johnson-Billy, Alisha Williams & Seth Fairchild)	2:14
2.	"The First Choctaw" (featuring Brenner Billy, Bryon "Mahli" Billy, Philip L. Billy, Lisa Johnson-Billy, Alisha Williams & Seth Fairchild)	3:28
3.	"A Better Life"	2:26
4.	"Already Gone"	2:34
5.	"Kingpin"	3:21
6.	"Queenpin"	5:56
7.	"Cage Fight"	1:59
8.	"Birth of a Villain"	2:33
9.	"Never Rest"	2:11
10.	"Bushto"	4:56
11.	"Train Heist"	7:50
12.	"Zane"	3:18
13.	"The Mighty Tuklo"	4:29
14.	"Ohoyo-yvt Na Moma Ikhaiyana (She Who Remembers All)" (performed by Brenner Billy, Bryon "Mahli" Billy, Philip L. Billy, Lisa Johnson-Billy, Alisha Williams & Seth Fairchild)	1:10
15.	"Rink Fight"	2:36
16.	"Shaped by Those Before You"	3:33
17.	"Echoes of the Ancestors"	6:39
18.	"Who's the Monster?"	4:55
19.	"Slingshot"	2:39
20.	"Remember Your Gifts"	3:39
21.	"Seeds of Strength" (featuring Brenner Billy, Bryon "Mahli" Billy, Philip L. Billy, Lisa Johnson-Billy, Alisha Williams & Seth Fairchild)	2:11
22.	"The Once and Future Kingpin"	2:45
Total length:		1:17:00

== Marketing ==
Alaqua Cox, D'Onofrio, Jacobs, Greene, Cody Lightning, Chaske Spencer, and Feige presented the first footage of the series in a first-look video at the D23 Expo in September 2022, which included subtitles. Wilson Chapman of Variety highlighted many scenes featuring Echo "kicking ass" and of the Native American people, and the appearance of Vincent D'Onofrio's Kingpin with an eyepatch. Aidan Kelley from Collider said the footage perfectly set up the series' tone and made it clear that Lopez's Native American heritage would be prominent throughout. Kelley also said the footage showed Lopez being "a total badass with an incredible performance from Alaqua Cox who just exudes charisma without uttering a single word". The first trailer was released on November 3, 2023. Michael McWhertor at Polygon called the footage "shockingly violent" and pointed out its inclusion of a brief Daredevil cameo. Later that day, the first two episodes were screened at the District area of the Choctaw Casinos & Resorts in Durant, Oklahoma, with Freeland also participating in a Q&A. The MOWA Choctaw Cultural Center also began one of the Choctaw Nation's largest annual powwows to promote the series and celebrate National American Indian Heritage Month. A trailer released on December 16, 2023, that indicated the series' earlier release date, was noted for its brutal and bloody violence, which Ray Flook of Bleeding Cool believed was the most seen in a Marvel series since Marvel Television's Netflix series. ComicBook.com's Adam Barnhardt pointed out the use of narration in the trailer, "a rare occurrence for a Marvel Studios show", to note Echo's use of violence.

A teaser released a week before the series' premiere included footage of Fisk and Daredevil from Daredevil. James Whitbrook at Gizmodo opined that this, along with comments from Winderbaum about personally believing Daredevil should be part of the MCU's Sacred Timeline, was "[s]addling Echo as [a] proto-Daredevil sequel" that "speaks to the complex, complicated ways Marvel now has to deal with the shared universe boom". He also found it "funny" that Echo was focusing on its connections to Daredevil when it was supposed to be the first "Marvel Spotlight" series that was created to be largely standalone and free from needing to know other films or series to understand and watch. Following the series' release, Cox promoted it with several talk show appearances while Freeland was set to discuss the series at the Sundance Film Festival and at the racial justice organization IllumiNative's Indigenous House.

== Release ==
Echo was simultaneously released in its entirety on Disney+ and Hulu on January 9, 2024, at 9 p.m. Eastern Time, consisting of five episodes. The series was the first Marvel Studios series to release all of its episodes at once, as the studio's previous series were released weekly. Echo was available on Hulu until April 9, 2024. A Choctaw language dub of the episodes became available on November 1, 2024. Consultant Terry Billy explained that translating between English and Choctaw was about getting as close as possible to the intended verbiage or context and, when that was not possible, interpreting the context into "everyday" Choctaw.

The series was originally scheduled to be released in mid-2023, before Dayre stated in December 2022 that the series would likely be released around a year from then, indicating a late 2023 premiere, which Marvel Studios subsequently announced as November 29, 2023, before it was delayed in September 2023 to January 10, 2024. Marvel Studios later announced the series would debut the night before on January 9. It is part of Phase Five of the MCU, and the first series released under the "Marvel Spotlight" banner.

== Reception ==
=== Viewership ===
Echo premiered at number one on both Disney+ and Hulu. Its release also led to increased viewership for Hawkeye, the first two seasons of Daredevil, and the first season of The Punisher on Disney+. TVision, which utilizes its TVision Power Score to evaluate CTV programming performance by factoring in viewership and engagement across over 1,000 apps and incorporating four key metrics—viewer attention time, total program time available for the season, program reach, and app reach—calculated that Echo was the top streaming series for the week of January 8. The streaming aggregator Reelgood, which tracks real-time data from 5 million U.S. users for original and acquired content across SVOD and AVOD services, revealed that Echo was the fifth most-streamed program during the week of January 11. JustWatch, a guide to streaming content with access to data from more than 20 million users around the world, reported that Echo ranked as the fifth most-streamed television series from January 8—11.

Whip Media, which tracks viewership data for the more than 25 million worldwide users of its TV Time app, calculated that Echo was the sixth most-streamed original series in the U.S. during the week of January 28. It later moved to tenth place during the week of February 4. Nielsen Media Research, which records streaming viewership on U.S. television screens, estimated that the series was watched for 731 million minutes from January 8—14. Nielsen also reported that Echo attracted an audience typical of Marvel series, with two-thirds of viewers aged 35–64 and 60% male. Luminate, which measures streaming performance in the U.S. by analyzing viewership data, audience engagement metrics, and content reach across various platforms, reported that Echo was the most watched Marvel show on Disney+, accounting for 11.8% of total viewership, according to data compiled between December 29, 2023, and May 10, 2024. Luminate also calculated that Echo was watched for 1,537 million minutes in 2024.

=== Critical response ===
The review aggregator website Rotten Tomatoes reports a 70% approval rating with an average rating of 6.4/10, based on 88 reviews. The site's critical consensus reads, "Alaqua Cox makes Echo's first season consistently worth watching, while hard-hitting action and fresh narrative elements suggest strong potential for this slow-building series." Metacritic, which uses a weighted average, assigned a score of 62 out of 100 based on 23 critics, indicating "generally favorable reviews".

=== Accolades ===
Cox's performance was an honorable mention for TVLine Performer of the Week for the week ending January 13, 2024, with Keisha Hatchett stating Cox "delivered her best performance" in the series' finale episode where she "unleashed the Choctaw warrior within", calling it "empowering to see her cry while speaking with her mother's spirit, her tear-filled eyes packing a harder punch than the physical blows in the scenes that followed". Cox is nominated for Best Actress in a Limited Series or TV Movie at the 4th Astra TV Awards, while Ambre Wrigley, Kizzie Martin Lillas, and Kristina Elaine Taylor are nominated for Outstanding Fantasy/Sci-Fi Costumes at the 76th Primetime Creative Arts Emmy Awards for their work on "Lowak".

== Documentary special ==
In February 2021, the documentary series Marvel Studios: Assembled was announced. The special on this series, "The Making of Echo", was released on Disney+ on January 31, 2024. It explores how the creative team learned American Sign Language and worked to accurately portray Native American culture, as well as the collaboration between Marvel Studios and the Choctaw Nation.

== Future ==
In November 2022, D'Onofrio stated that Echo would lead into the events of the Disney+ series Daredevil: Born Again, with D'Onofrio and Charlie Cox reprising their respective roles as Wilson Fisk / Kingpin and Matt Murdock / Daredevil. Following the series' successful debut, Marvel Studios reportedly expressed interest in using Echo for future MCU projects and began developing new ideas related to its street-level heroes.
