= Wilson Fisk (Marvel Cinematic Universe) =

- Marvel Cinematic Universe character
- Vincent D'Onofrio as Fisk in promotional material for the third season of Daredevil (2018)
- First appearance: "Into the Ring" (voice only) "Rabbit in a Snowstorm"; Daredevil; April 10, 2015
- Based on: Kingpin by: Stan Lee; John Romita Sr.
- Adapted by: Drew Goddard
- Portrayed by: Vincent D'Onofrio; Cole Jensen (young)

In-universe information
- Full name: Wilson Grant Fisk
- Alias: Kingpin
- Title: Mayor of New York City (formerly)
- Affiliation: Tracksuit Mafia; Sloan Limited; Union Allied; Confederated Global Investments; Vancorp; Fisk Industries; Fat Man Auto Repair; Red Lion National Bank; Black Knife Cartel; Anti-Vigilante Task Force
- Family: Bill Fisk (father); Marlene Vistain (mother); Maya Lopez (adopted niece)
- Spouse: Vanessa Fisk

Wilson Grant Fisk is a fictional character portrayed by Vincent D'Onofrio in the Marvel Cinematic Universe (MCU) media franchise, based on the Marvel Comics character of the same name. Introduced as a powerful crime boss and businessman nicknamed the Kingpin, Fisk is put at odds with the vigilante Daredevil, who seeks to expose his activities.

Fisk has had multiple partnerships, having allied himself with Eleanor Bishop, Kazi Kazimierczak, and Benjamin Poindexter, and mentored his adopted niece Maya Lopez. He also married Vanessa Fisk, and became the Mayor of New York City, after learning Daredevil's identity as Matt Murdock. His criminal activities have brought the attention of other vigilantes, including Frank Castle, Clint Barton, Kate Bishop, Jack Duquesne, Angela del Toro, and Jessica Jones. As Mayor, Fisk founded the Anti-Vigilante Task Force (AVTF) in order to prevent vigilantes from foiling his plans again, declared martial law and shut down New York City to consolidate his power as ruler. Due to Vanessa's death, Fisk discovers that his power as Mayor is unraveling because his crimes were exposed through Red Hook's testimonies, turning the city against him. After being confronted by Daredevil's army, Fisk resigns as Mayor following Murdock's offer to leave the city.

D'Onofrio first appeared as the character in the Netflix series Daredevil (2015–2018), which was produced by Marvel Television. He went on to appear in the Disney+ series Hawkeye (2021), Echo (2024), and Daredevil: Born Again (2025–present), all produced by Marvel Studios. D'Onofrio's performance as Fisk has been critically praised, garnering a Saturn Award nomination in 2016. In 2019, Rolling Stone declared Fisk the 26th greatest TV villain of all time.

== Fictional character biography ==
=== Early life and crime boss ===
As a boy, Wilson Grant Fisk and his mother were emotionally and physically abused by his father, Bill, until Fisk killed him with a hammer. His mother, Marlene Vistain, helped him cover up the murder. Fisk grows up wanting to make Hell's Kitchen a better place, where there are no "bad" people like his father, and plans to buy the entire neighborhood, demolish it, and build it up better.

By 2007, Fisk establishes himself as a criminal businessman, and goes into business with William Lopez and his criminal gang, the Tracksuit Mafia. He grows close with Lopez's daughter, Maya, whom he treats like a daughter. Fisk also helps Derek Bishop through a tough financial situation. In 2012, after the Battle of New York and Derek's death, Fisk goes into business with Derek's wife, Eleanor Bishop, to pay off Derek's debt.

=== Battling Daredevil ===
In 2015, Fisk receives opposition from lawyers Matt Murdock and Foggy Nelson. His rivalry with Daredevil (who is secretly Murdock) and relationship with Vanessa Marianna cause his allies to lose faith in him and attempt to poison Vanessa. Before being exposed by journalist Ben Urich, Fisk kills him. His assistant James Wesley is also killed by Murdock's secretary Karen Page. His dealings are exposed to the FBI by a whistle-blower that Murdock protected. He attempts to escape custody but is defeated in combat by Daredevil and incarcerated at Ryker's Island.

Eight months later, Fisk works to gain control of the inmates while being visited by his lawyer Benjamin Donovan. When Frank Castle is sent to Ryker's Island, Fisk manipulates him into killing a rival inmate who happened to have knowledge of Castle's family's murder, and later orchestrates Castle's escape, after firstly having him massacre an entire cell block of prisoners.

In 2017, Fisk cuts a deal with FBI Agent Ray Nadeem to become their informant in exchange for a house arrest deal at the Presidential Hotel and for Vanessa to not be incriminated for Fisk's crimes. Fisk learns of Murdock's identity as Daredevil and starts swaying some of the FBI to his side, including the mentally unstable Benjamin "Dex" Poindexter, whom he hires to pose as Daredevil. After a video of Nadeem posthumously testifying against him leaks at his wedding to Vanessa, he gets into a three-way fight with Daredevil and Poindexter, who went rogue after hearing Fisk orchestrated the murder of Julia, a woman he was obsessed with. Fisk shatters Poindexter's spine but is defeated by Murdock. He accepts a bargain to return to Ryker's Island and not harm Murdock's loved ones in exchange for Vanessa's safety from prosecution.

=== After the Blip ===
In 2018, Fisk survives the Blip and has been acquitted following the FBI corruption scandal. He went on to rebuild his criminal empire, re-allying himself with the Tracksuit Mafia and reorganizing their operations to carry out further criminal activity from within a remote base of operations, doubling as an auto shop named "Fat Man Auto Repair". During this time, Fisk dispatches an informant to alert former Avenger-turned-vigilante Clint Barton of the Tracksuit Mafia's operations and hideout, allowing Barton to kill every residing member within, including Lopez.

In 2021, Fisk begins mentoring a grieving and rebellious Maya, enlisting her into the Tracksuit Mafia, of which she later takes command.

=== Confronted by Maya Lopez ===
In December 2024, Eleanor's daughter Kate assists Barton in dismantling the Tracksuit Mafia. Rattled by Barton's investigation, Eleanor attempts to blackmail Fisk to end their partnership, to which Fisk dispatches Kazi Kazimierczak and the Tracksuit Mafia to kill her. He also reluctantly orders them to kill Maya as well, after she learns from Barton that Fisk orchestrated her father's death. On Christmas Eve, Fisk locates Eleanor and attempts to kill her, but is stopped and defeated by Kate. After fleeing the scene, Fisk is confronted by Maya, who shoots him in the head.

Five months later, in 2025, Fisk survives Maya's gun shot, and recovers in a hospital, wearing an eyepatch. Fisk orders his men not to kill Maya and that same night he meets with her and offers her his empire if she accompanies him to New York. Maya attempts to kill Fisk, but sympathizes with him after he tells her that he killed his father for being abusive to his mother. After Maya refuses to go with him to New York, Fisk kidnaps Chula and Bonnie and tells her that he will kill the rest of her family. Maya, Chula, and Bonnie fight against Fisk's men and Maya takes Fisk to a memory of when his father mistreated his mother, asking him to return the hammer and free himself from the pain. Fisk refuses to let go of his past memories and flees once again. On his return to New York, Fisk observes a news story about the ideal candidate for the next Mayor of New York City, which sparks Fisk's interest.

=== Mayor of New York City ===
In late 2026, Fisk announces his intentions to run as mayor of New York with an anti-vigilantism agenda, hoping to move beyond his criminal empire, which Vanessa had been operating in his absence. He is aided by associates Sheila Rivera, Buck Cashman, and Daniel Blake. During a public meet, Fisk cautions Murdock about returning to his activities as Daredevil, as he has retired from vigilantism since Nelson's murder at the hands of Poindexter a year prior. Following his victory, Fisk confronts Vanessa about her affair with a man named Adam, but promises not to kill him due to his change of heart.

In 2027, he and Vanessa undergo marriage counselling with therapist Heather Glenn, who is also dating Murdock. He initiates a renovation of the Red Hook Pier into an industrial complex. During a party with New York's socialites, including Eleanor's ex-fiancé and secret vigilante Jack Duquesne, Fisk attempts to propose his Red Hook renewal project to attendees, who reject his initiatives. When informed about the serial killer Muse, Fisk assembles the Anti-Vigilante Task Force (AVTF), composed of corrupt police officers who use Castle's Punisher logo, to take measures beyond jurisdiction, much to the concern of NYPD Commissioner Gallo. Fisk is informed about Daredevil's return and Muse's identity to be Glenn's troubled client Bastian Cooper. When Daredevil goes to rescue Glenn from Cooper, Fisk sends the AVTF to Glenn's office. Cooper is killed by Glenn and Fisk gives the credit to the AVTF, publicly declaring them to be heroes. He also has Blake threaten Urich's niece and journalist BB into removing eyewitness mentions of Daredevil's involvement in the incident from her blog.

After being threatened by Luca, one of the crime dons in the Five Families, Fisk has Vanessa send him into a trap to be killed by Cashman. Fisk reveals to Vanessa he has Adam imprisoned and watches as she kills him, affirming her love for Fisk. During an inaugural ball benefitting the Red Hook project, Murdock dives in front of Fisk to take a bullet from Poindexter, who had escaped from custody. Fisk reveals to Vanessa his knowledge of her hiring Poindexter to kill Nelson, and sends Cashman to kill an hospitalized Murdock, who escapes. Fisk's plans to establish a city-state in Red Hook are discovered by Murdock and Page. Fisk kills Gallo after his attempt to undermine Fisk is exposed by Rivera. Fisk declares martial law, employs Glenn as his Commissioner of Mental Health, outlaws vigilantism through the Safer Streets Initiative, and imprisons Duquesne, Castle, and other dissidents in Red Hook.

=== Crusade against vigilantism ===
Six months later, Fisk has increased the presence of the AVTF officers throughout New York City and placed Glenn in charge of psychologically evaluating vigilantes under his custody ahead of their trials. When Daredevil provokes the sinking of the Northern Star cargo ship and indefinitely halts his weapons smuggling operations through Red Hook, Fisk orders a salvage crew led by AVTF Officer Powell and for intensified efforts in the manhunt against both Murdock and Karen Page, who are in hiding following his enactment of martial law. While hearing inquiries at New York City Hall, Fisk is interrupted by Mr. Charles, an informant sent on behalf of CIA director Valentina Allegra de Fontaine as she attempts to influence support towards Fisk's Safer Streets initiative. At dinner, he persuades a reluctant Fisk to collaborate with the CIA in outsourcing the salvage crew for the Northern Star, suggesting that employees not tied to the AVTF would be harder to trace back to the administration's activities.

Fisk issues a missing persons report on Murdock to draw him out of hiding by influencing public sympathy throughout the city, while also learning that a smear campaign against his administration is being discreetly run by an individual dressed as and leaking information about him, pressuring Daniel Blake as Deputy Mayor towards uncovering their whereabouts. Fisk's influence over the judiciary committee and justices in the vigilante trials leads to Duquesne being found guilty in his hearing despite dubious evidence. When Fisk is informed that Daredevil, Page and Angela del Toro / White Tiger freed Duquesne and the prisoners at Red Hook, he orders the AVTF to kill the night crew on the Northern Star, putting further public pressure on the vigilantes. Fisk encounters Charles again, who tries to persuade him to restart Red Hook's arms shipments, though Fisk warns him to be patient after Cashman easily kills his backup. When Fisk tries to protect Vanessa, he attends a propaganda boxing match at Fogwell's Gym and wins by brutally beating his opponent. However, he sees Vanessa attending the match, realizing it's a trap to lure Poindexter. When Poindexter attacks and is injured by Vanessa defending him, Fisk saves her by destroying a piece of glass merchandise with his championship belt. After Murdock arrives and pulls Poindexter from the ring, Fisk discovers Vanessa is injured, with a shard of glass lodged in her head, causing profuse bleeding and unconsciousness.

After Vanessa is hospitalized, Fisk orders Powell to send the AVTF to scour the city for Poindexter and Murdock and bring them back to him alive. Fisk recalls some moments when his former confidant, James Wesley, who hired Cashman to kill Lionel "Ray" McCoy, who narrowly escaped, set up an art gallery to serve as a cover for Fisk, which led him to meet Vanessa. Fisk stays with her to comfort her when she awakens, having undergone surgery and suffered brain damage. However, Vanessa’s condition quickly deteriorates, and dies, leaving Fisk heartbroken. After killing the doctor who treated Vanessa, Fisk mourns her death and is summoned by Charles, who has learned that the AVTF stole the weapons at Red Hook. Fisk discovers that masked rebels are staging protests against him and is exposed by the Red Hook testimonies projected by Page. Fisk is offered a deal by Murdock: to make peace if they both leave New York, which he refuses and they fight, and Fisk is defeated without Murdock killing him.

After his fight with Murdock, Fisk is informed by the AVTF that they have captured Page. Instead of killing her, he decides to manipulate the court to sentence her. He also sends an assassin to kill Governor Marge McCaffrey to avoid his dismissal, but he is thwarted by Poindexter. As he watches the court proceedings on TV, Fisk sees Murdock, who has returned to the public spotlight as Page's lawyer to defend her. Since the trial isn't until the next day, he sends the AVTF to eliminate Murdock and McDuffie, but his plan doesn't go as expected when they both escape. Fisk arrives at the trial with Cashman, Glenn, and his AVTF officers to testify against Page. He sees Murdock return to the courtroom, calling witnesses like Jessica Jones and McCaffrey, which forces him to tell the truth. After Murdock reveals his identity as Daredevil to drop the charges against Page, Fisk knows this isn't over. Seeing Cashman wounded by Poindexter, he and his group take refuge inside the courthouse. Fisk emerges after fighting masked civilians, only to find himself facing Daredevil's army. Fisk agrees to resign as Mayor after Murdock's offer and leaves New York City, ending up on a beach on his private island, where Vanessa would have loved to be.

== Casting and characterization ==
Vincent D'Onofrio, who was cast as Wilson Fisk in June 2014, stated that he hoped his portrayal of Fisk was a new way to look at the character, and that it would be the definitive portrayal of the character. "Our Fisk, he's a child and he's a monster," D'Onofrio said. "Every move that he makes and everything that he does in our story comes from his foundation of morality inside himself". Cole Jensen plays a young Wilson Fisk. Writer Corey Latta notes that Fisk and Murdock both grow up fatherless, but allow that experience to pull them in very different directions.

DeKnight detailed that "Fisk has very many different aspects so it's not all, 'I want to conquer the city and make a lot of money'. In our story, we tell the story of how he met his wife Vanessa and how they fell in love". He also said that "if you're looking for a juicy, multi-faceted crime drama, Wilson Fisk was the obvious choice to play the antagonist ... [he] really felt like the right yin to the yang for Matt, and for what we wanted to do this season". Concerning Fisk not being called Kingpin during the first season, like he is in the comics, DeKnight explained that "I think there is a, dare I say, critical mass where things get a little bit silly. You know if in the last five minutes we went, 'Oh they called him Daredevil! Oh they called him Kingpin!' It's a little too much. Also there was no real natural way to get to Kingpin. It felt a little off. There is a point down the line to get there". Discussing Fisk's fighting style, compared to Daredevil's, series stunt coordinator Philip J Silvera said that, "I feel like they're almost two sides to the same coin. They're both doing things for their city. And it's a tricky thing with their two characters. I think when you get the Fisk character to a certain point, it just becomes pure rage, and all thought process is out the window. ... The brutality is just relentless with him. When he gets into this mode, he just keeps going until he's done. And that's it. He will drive for you. That is the Kingpin, that is D'Onofrio. He's a very smooth, calculating individual, but when you bring the rage out in him, he's like a bulldozer".

While Fisk typically appears wearing a white suit, in his appearance in Hawkeye, he wore a white suit jacket over a bold red and white Hawaiian shirt, an homage to the appearance of the character in a 2014 Spider-Man graphic novel.

Maslansky explained that "Wilson Fisk has a specific look. His choices reflect the man he is and the man he's become. As with Matt Murdock's costumes, I was influenced by the comics with the same stipulation that they feel authentic and modern. We dressed Fisk in current style, embracing a slim silhouette. It's classic and consistent. His clothing was custom-made by a highly skilled tailor, Michael Andrews who's well versed in modern design details". Significant props used for Fisk in the series are his father's cufflinks, on which Maslansky said, "[Fisk's father] would have bought them in the 1950s or '60s—a mid-century design. We searched for the perfect vintage cufflinks. We finally landed on a sterling silver pair with interesting negative space. We knew from reading ahead we'd need many duplicates. I redesigned them, adding more detail—a tiger's eye stone and a portion of it cast in gold. They retained a mid-century look, enhanced to become unique in the world".

== Appearances ==
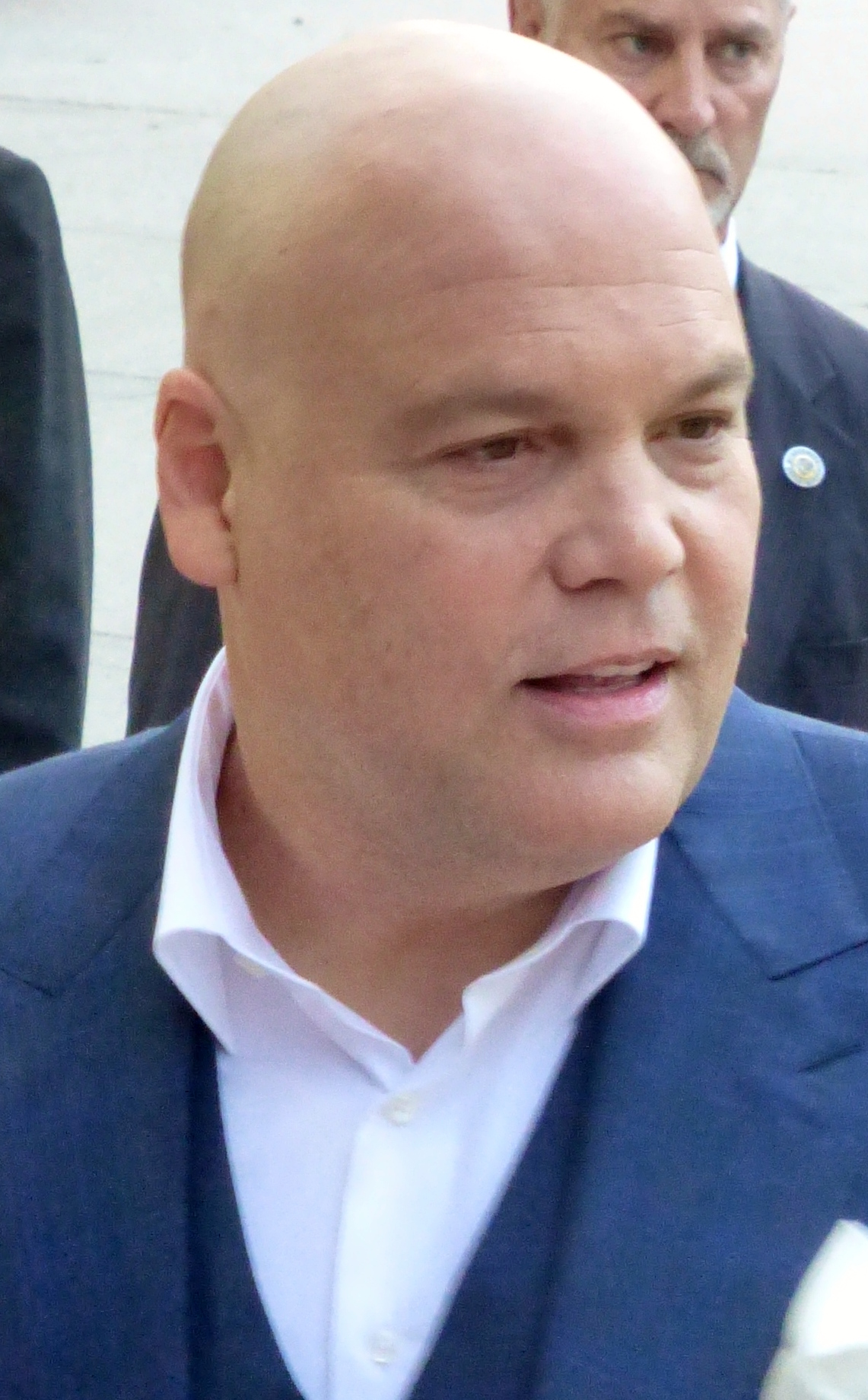
D'Onofrio at the 2014 Toronto International Film Festival

Fisk has appeared portrayed by Vincent D'Onofrio in four television series of the MCU. He first appears in Marvel Television's Netflix series Daredevil (2015–2018), and returns in Marvel Studios' Disney+ series Hawkeye (2021), Echo (2024), and Daredevil: Born Again (2025–present).

== Reception ==
=== Critical response ===
D'Onofrio's performance as Fisk received critical praise, being highlighted as one of the best-received aspects of Daredevil and Marvel's Netflix television series as a whole. Alex Abad-Santos of Vox called him "the single best thing about [the series]' first installment". Jeet Heer, writing for The New Republic, described the MCU's take on the character as "Brought to life with a shy dignity and subdued menace", while Matt Patches from Esquire commented that the show "Takes time to nuance the character, unheard of for a villain in the MCU. Fisk is a romantic, an idealist, a fighter, and not terribly different than his costumed opponent. Speaking on his performance in the final season of the series, Mark Hughes of Forbes wrote that the actor left him awestruck through his performance, stating that it was "A role I'd previously thought was nearly impossible to fill because I couldn't imagine any actor capturing the delicate balance between cunning villainy, secret vulnerabilities, and sheer larger-than-life presentation required to really get the character right. D'Onofrio not only proved me wrong, he actually managed to improve upon a character who already had decades of exceptional stories in the comics featuring many iconic arcs".

=== Awards and nominations ===
Year	Work	Award	Category	Result	Ref.
2015	Daredevil	EWwy Awards	Best Supporting Actor in a Drama Series	Nominated	
2015	Daredevil	IGN Awards	Best TV Actor	Nominated	
2015	Daredevil	IGN Awards	Best TV Villain	Nominated	
2016	Daredevil	Saturn Awards	Best Supporting Actor on Television	Nominated	
2018	Daredevil	IGN Awards	Best Dramatic TV Performance	Nominated	
2022	Hawkeye	Critics' Choice Super Awards	Best Villain in a Series	Nominated	
2025	Daredevil: Born Again	Astra TV Awards	Best Supporting Actor in a Drama Series	Nominated	
2025	Daredevil: Born Again	Critics' Choice Super Awards	Best Villain in a Series, Limited Series or Made-for-TV Movie	Nominated	
