= Alaqua Cox =

Native American actress (born 1997)

- Born: February 13, 1997 (age 29); Menominee Indian Reservation, Wisconsin, U.S.
- Education: Wisconsin School for the Deaf
- Occupation: Actress
- Years active: 2021–present
- Children: 2

Alaqua Cox (born February 13, 1997) is a Native American (Menominee) actress. She landed her breakthrough role – her first ever acting experience – as Maya Lopez / Echo within the Marvel Cinematic Universe in the Disney+ series Hawkeye (2021), continuing as the protagonist in the spin-off series Echo (2024).

== Early life ==
Cox was born Deaf. She was born and raised in the Menominee Indian Reservation in Keshena, Wisconsin, and is of the Menominee and Mohican nation. She attended the Wisconsin School for the Deaf, where she played on the girls' basketball team from 2014 to 2015 and on the volleyball team.

Part of Cox's right leg is amputated. She uses a prosthesis.

== Career ==
On December 2, 2020, in her acting debut, she was cast in Hawkeye as Echo. The news drew applause from deaf activist Nyle DiMarco. In June 2021, Echo co-creator David W. Mack reacted to the news of the Echo television series by expressing gratitude to Cox for being a representative for deaf and indigenous youth: "I taught at the School for the Deaf in Africa, Asia, [and] Europe, in my work for the U.S. State Department, [and] the students love Echo [and] will be happy about this."

At Marvel's Hawkeye premiere, Cox told a reporter from Variety. "I don't know why they're giving me this opportunity, but I'm just grateful. I'm excited for the support and being able to advocate for the deaf community. We want to have that equality and get more people involved. I'm just so grateful for all of the opportunities I've been given." Cox told Disney's D23 magazine that Jeremy Renner and Hailee Steinfeld both worked to learn some American Sign Language so that they could communicate more easily with her. "I thought it was sweet of them putting in efforts to learn basic ASL to communicate with me. It means a lot to me as a deaf person."

Cox went on to star as the character in the miniseries Echo (2024).

== Personal life ==
Cox's father died in November 2021. Her maternal cousin, Darnell Besaw, played the child version of Cox's character in both Hawkeye and Echo.

On Mother's Day 2023, Cox announced that she was expecting a baby boy named Mukwa with her fiancé. Her first son was born that October. In November 2024, Cox announced that she was expecting a second baby boy, who was born in June 2025. Her fiancé is also deaf, and their first son Mukwa is hearing.

== Filmography ==
=== Television ===
Year	Title	Role	Notes
2021	Hawkeye	Maya Lopez / Echo	Supporting role; 5 episodes
2022–2024	Marvel Studios: Assembled	Herself	2 episodes
2024	Echo	Maya Lopez / Echo	Lead role; 5 episodes

=== Film ===
Year	Title	Role	Notes
TBA	Flash Before the Bang		Post-production
