= Never Meet Your Heroes =

- Hawkeye episode
- Promotional poster
- Episode no.: Episode 1
- Directed by: Rhys Thomas
- Written by: Jonathan Igla
- Cinematography by: Eric Steelberg
- Editing by: Terel Gibson
- Original release date: November 24, 2021
- Running time: 49 minutes

Cast
- Carlos Navarro as Enrique; Ben Sakamoto as Cooper Barton; Ava Russo as Lila Barton; Cade Woodward as Nathaniel Barton; Clara Stack as young Kate Bishop; Nichele Lambert as Greer; Regina Bryant as Franny; Brian Troxell as Gary; Jonathan Bergman as Armand Duquesne VII; Pat Kiernan as himself

Episode chronology
← Previous —	Next → "Hide and Seek"

"Never Meet Your Heroes" is the first episode of the American television series Hawkeye, based on Marvel Comics featuring the characters Clint Barton / Hawkeye and Kate Bishop. It follows Bishop, who is drawn into a conspiracy that forces Barton out of retirement. The episode is set in the Marvel Cinematic Universe (MCU), sharing continuity with the films of the franchise. It was written by head writer Jonathan Igla and directed by Rhys Thomas.

Jeremy Renner reprises his role as Clint Barton from the film series, with Hailee Steinfeld joining him as Kate Bishop. Tony Dalton, Fra Fee, Brian d'Arcy James, Aleks Paunovic, Piotr Adamczyk, Linda Cardellini, Simon Callow, and Vera Farmiga also star. Igla joined the series in September 2019, with Thomas joining in July 2020. Filming took place in New York City, with additional filming and soundstage work occurring in Atlanta, Georgia.

"Never Meet Your Heroes" was released on Disney+ on November 24, 2021. Critics praised Steinfeld's performance as Bishop, but felt the episode's pacing was slow due to limited action.

== Plot ==
During the Battle of New York in 2012, (Note: As depicted in the film The Avengers (2012).) a young Kate Bishop is saved from a Chitauri warrior by Clint Barton, but her father Derek is killed in the chaos. Following Derek's funeral, Kate vows to become a hero to keep her and her mother Eleanor safe.

In the present day, Kate has become an experienced archer, martial artist, and fencer. As part of a bet with her friends Franny and Greer, Kate causes an incident at her college when she tries to use an arrow with a ball attached to it to ring a bell in the college's clock tower called Stane Tower. This causes Stane Tower's bell to collapse part of it as she gets caught by campus security.

Kate later visits Eleanor for Christmas who has persuaded the college's dean not to expel Kate in exchange for paying for the repairs. Eleanor then punishes her daughter by deactivating Kate's credit cards until further notice while stating that she can get hurt someday. In addition to being told by her mother that she can make it up to her by attending tonight's charity auction gala, Kate discovers Eleanor's engagement to Jack Duquesne, a wealthy socialite.

At a charity auction gala, Kate encounters a golden retriever named Lucky while getting some air. She becomes suspicious of Duquesne and his uncle Armand III, following them into a secret black market auction featuring items recovered from the wreckage of the Avengers Compound (Note: As depicted in the film Avengers: Endgame (2019).) where they both bid on a sword belonging to the brutal vigilante Ronin.

Suddenly, a group of masked mercenaries known as the Tracksuit Mafia break into the auction and take the attendees hostage in search of a mysterious watch. Jack uses the chaos to steal the sword while Kate dons the Ronin attire and takes down the thugs, freeing the hostages and saving Lucky in the process from the Mafia and from oncoming traffic, taking him home with her and adopts him.

Meanwhile, Barton, who is struggling to come to terms with his deeds done as Ronin and the death of Natasha Romanoff, enjoys a night out with his children and later sees Kate in the Ronin attire saving Lucky on the news. Kate leaves Lucky at her apartment and tracks down Armand to investigate him, only to find him dead in his house. She flees the murder scene but is ambushed by the Mafia and hides in a car, until she is saved by Barton, who confronts her.

== Production ==
=== Development ===
By April 2019, Marvel Studios was developing a Disney+ series starring Jeremy Renner's Clint Barton / Hawkeye from the Marvel Cinematic Universe (MCU) films, in which Barton would bequeath the mantle of Hawkeye to Kate Bishop. In September 2019, Jonathan Igla was hired as head writer of Hawkeye, and in July 2020, Rhys Thomas was hired to direct three episodes for the series. Igla and Thomas executive produce alongside Marvel Studios' Brad Winderbaum, Trinh Tran, Victoria Alonso, Louis D'Esposito, and Kevin Feige. The first episode, titled "Never Meet Your Heroes", was written by Igla, and was released on November 24, 2021.

=== Writing ===
Opening the episode with the Battle of New York was part of Igla's pitch since his hiring. Igla conceived the idea wanting to set up the notion of being different points of view, reminiscent to the 2012 Hawkeye comic book run of Matt Fraction and David Aja. In this case, the battle is revisited through a younger Kate Bishop's point of view, which Igla felt that allowed the audience to "jump[ing] back and forth a little bit in time" and see things from different perspectives. He also wanted to pair Bishop's first look of Hawkeye with her father's death, since witnessing her parents' death and an alien invasion concurrently would be completely terrifying.

Feeling that how Barton and Bishop would meet for the first time should be with a peculiar coincidence, Igla decided to have Bishop sneak into the black market auction for reasons unrelated to Hawkeye only for her to recover and don the Ronin suit due to her desire to help people, leading Barton to later see what she did on television, but her act of rescuing Lucky the Pizza Dog quickly planting Barton the idea that who is wearing his former costume may be a good person, though Barton seeing the costume again is a "nightmare" that he considered "dead and buried". However, the scene of the first conversation between Barton and Bishop had yet to be written when Hailee Steinfeld was cast, as they wrote the show with Steinfeld in mind. Being part of their "wishlist" of characters the writers wanted to include in the show, the Tracksuit Mafia were chosen as the main villains after their debut in the Fraction/Aja run, having become classic Hawkeye villains since then. It was executive producer Trinh Tran's idea for Bishop to put on the Ronin suit, as it was a crucial moment for the writers because it unlocked the moment where the storylines of Barton and Bishop merged.

Igla also decided to include a montage about why Barton needs a hearing aid after his many adventures seen in the films to showcase the lasting impact of his heroic lifestyle has, unlike the other super-powered teammates. He chose the montage moments by suggesting to elect the most "cinematic, expensive-looking explosion and Avengers-level offense" that Hawkeye has been through. Tanner Bean, the show's executive story editor, rewatched Avengers: Endgame (2019) to see what other artifacts the Tracksuit Mafia could have found in the rubble of the film's climactic battle for the black market auction scene, and one thing he tried to include was the "La Cucaracha"-playing steering wheel from Luis' van, though the Easter egg was not included.

=== Casting ===
The episode stars Jeremy Renner as Clint Barton / Hawkeye, Hailee Steinfeld as Kate Bishop, Tony Dalton as Jack Duquesne, Fra Fee as Kazi, Brian d'Arcy James as Derek Bishop, Aleks Paunovic as Ivan, Piotr Adamczyk as Thomas, Linda Cardellini as Laura Barton, Simon Callow as Armand Duquesne III, and Vera Farmiga as Eleanor. Also appearing are Carlos Navarro as Enrique, Ben Sakamoto as Cooper Barton, Ava Russo as Lila Barton, Cade Woodward as Nathaniel Barton, Clara Stack as young Kate Bishop, Nichele Lambert as Greer, Regina Bryant as Franny, Brian Troxell as Gary, and Jonathan Bergman as Armand Duquesne VII. Additionally, Hiroyuki Sanada appears as Akihiko in archive footage from Avengers: Endgame.

=== Filming and design ===
External videos
- Marvel Studios' Hawkeye: Episode One Opening Title Sequence presents the episode's main title sequence, YouTube video from Perception's channel

Filming began in early December 2020 in New York City, including at the Lotte New York Palace Hotel. Additional filming took place at Trilith Studios and Tyler Perry Studios in Atlanta, Georgia. The episode's main title sequence was designed by Perception. Unlike the subsequent episodes, "Never Meet Your Heroes" features an opening title sequence which chronicles Bishop's story between her appearances before and after the sequence, with Perception creating the effect of time passing by skipping frames between key moments.

=== Music ===
The episode features the musical number "Save the City" from the fictional Broadway musical titled Rogers: The Musical, centered on the Battle of New York from The Avengers (2012) and written by Marc Shaiman and Scott Wittman. It was released as a single on November 24, 2021.

== Marketing ==
After the episode's release, Marvel announced merchandise inspired by the first two episodes as part of its weekly "Marvel Must Haves" promotion for each episode of the series, including apparel and Funko Pops, including Barton and Bishop with Lucky.

== Reception ==
=== Audience viewership ===
The viewer tracking application Samba TV reported that the series had the lowest premiere of the live action MCU series to date, with an estimated 1.5 million households checking out the episode in the first five days. This trailed the premieres for Loki (2.5M, 5 days), The Falcon and the Winter Soldier (1.8M, 3 days), and WandaVision (1.6M, 3 days). According to Nielsen Media Research who measure the number of minutes watched by United States audiences on television sets, Hawkeye was the second-most watched original series across streaming services for the week of November 22–28 with 853 million minutes watched. The two-episode premiere of Hawkeye was the top streaming series for viewers in the United States for the week ending November 28 according to Whip Media's TV Time.

=== Critical response ===
The review aggregator website Rotten Tomatoes reports a 100% approval rating with an average rating of 7.30/10, based on 16 reviews. The site's critical consensus reads, "Never Meet Your Heroes" "sets the table for Hawkeye's first season with an introductory episode that puts Hailee Steinfeld front and center."

Giving the episode 3 out of 5 stars, Keith Phipps from Vulture said the premiere "gets things off to a promising if short-on-fireworks start". Phipps praised the Christmas setting, stating that the episode had an "atmosphere that sets it apart from other MCU stories" as a result. He felt that the episode lacked context for older Kate Bishop and Barton's life due to the amount of set up in the episode and that the supporting characters were not featured as prominently as they could have been, especially considering the caliber of actors such as Farmiga portraying them. Overall, Phipps believed "Never Meet Your Heroes" was a good, but not perfect start to the series.

Jack Shepherd of GamesRadar+ praised both Renner and Steinfeld for their performances, saying Renner's Hawkeye was given "immediately more depth" than his previous MCU appearances, while Steinfeld brought charm to Bishop, despite her arrogance. Shepherd believed that certain parts of the episode had "tonal backlash", specifically when it came to the seriousness of the personal story of Barton and the "holiday campiness" throughout the episode. Shepherd also gave the episode 3 out of 5 stars, stating "when Hawkeye leans into its absurd, funny, Christmassy side, it succeeds".

Kirsten Howard of Den of Geek gave the two-episode premiere a 4.5 out of 5, liking the holiday setting and saying that they felt that "Renner's ability to do a lot of character work with a reaction shot means the audience takes a quick hit for his triumphs and losses in the wake of Thanos' misjudged pursuit". As a result, that was when they felt the series could be special.
