= Ronin (Hawkeye episode) =

- Hawkeye episode
- Promotional poster
- Episode no.: Episode 5
- Directed by: Bert & Bertie
- Written by: Jenna Noel Frazier
- Cinematography by: James Whitaker
- Editing by: Rosanne Tan
- Original release date: December 15, 2021
- Running time: 44 minutes

Cast
- Clayton English as Grills; Ivan Mbakop as Detective Caudle; Franco Castan as Detective Rivera; Yssa Mei Panganiban as Sonya; Annie Hamilton as Ana

Episode chronology
← Previous "Partners, Am I Right?"	Next → "So This Is Christmas?"

"Ronin" is the fifth episode of the American television miniseries Hawkeye, based on Marvel Comics featuring the characters Clint Barton / Hawkeye and Kate Bishop. The episode follows Barton and Bishop continuing to investigate a conspiracy. The episode is set in the Marvel Cinematic Universe (MCU), sharing continuity with the films of the franchise. It was written by Jenna Noel Frazier and directed by Bert and Bertie.

Jeremy Renner reprises his role as Clint Barton from the film series, with Hailee Steinfeld joining him as Kate Bishop. Florence Pugh, Tony Dalton, Fra Fee, Vincent D'Onofrio, Alaqua Cox, Aleks Paunovic, Piotr Adamczyk, Linda Cardellini, and Vera Farmiga also star. Bert and Bertie joined the series in July 2020. Filming took place in New York City, with additional filming and soundstage work occurring in Atlanta, Georgia.

"Ronin" was released on Disney+ on December 15, 2021. The episode received positive reviews from critics and audiences, particularly for its performances, action sequences, and the reveal of D'Onofrio reprising his role as Wilson Fisk / Kingpin from the Marvel Television series Daredevil.

== Plot ==
In 2018, Yelena Belova and Black Widow agent Sonya subdue a woman named Anna in her house, wanting to "deprogram" her like other Black Widows, freed from General Dreykov in 2016, but it turns out she didn't need their help. (Note: As depicted in Black Widow (2021).) Yelena soon becomes a victim of the Blip and re-emerges in 2023, (Note: As depicted in the films Avengers: Infinity War (2018) and Avengers: Endgame (2019).) hoping to talk with Natasha Romanoff, but eventually learns of her death. (Note: As depicted in Avengers: Endgame (2019).) In 2024, Kate Bishop informs her mother Eleanor about her fiancée Jack Duquesne's shell corporation Sloan Limited, which leads to his arrest.

Kate finds Yelena waiting for her in her apartment, where she learns that Yelena was sent to New York City to kill Clint Barton. After recovering in Grills' apartment, Barton goes to a memorial of the Avengers, apologizing to Romanoff. He puts on the Ronin suit and challenges Maya Lopez to a fight, trying to convince her to stop her vendetta against him and pursuing his family. He is rescued by Kate while Maya suspects Kazi Kazimierczak knows more information about the Bishop Christmas Party event.

The next day, Yelena informs Kate that she was hired by Eleanor to kill Barton and that Eleanor is working with Maya's "uncle", whom Barton identifies as Wilson Fisk / Kingpin.

== Production ==
=== Development ===
By April 2019, Marvel Studios was developing a Disney+ series starring Jeremy Renner's Clint Barton / Hawkeye from the Marvel Cinematic Universe (MCU) films, in which Barton would bequeath the mantle of Hawkeye to Kate Bishop. In July 2020, Bert and Bertie were hired to direct three episodes of Hawkeye. Executive producers for the series include head writer Jonathan Igla, Rhys Thomas, Brad Winderbaum, Trinh Tran, Victoria Alonso, Louis D'Esposito, and Kevin Feige. The fifth episode, titled "Ronin", was written by Jenna Noel Frazier, and was released on December 15, 2021.

=== Writing ===
While writing the episode, Marvel Studios gave Bert and Bertie access to secret screenings of Black Widow (2021), while also receiving information on the Statue of Liberty's depiction in Spider-Man: No Way Home (2021). On writing a reference for No Way Home in the episode, Bertie had said "There's a need to know basis. Things like that, there may have been a slightly larger reference to it in the original scripts". The tone of the hot sauce scene was influenced from the script, with Bert and Bertie calling the tone of the scene being "comedy and also real danger and then some very deep emotion and stakes". They also felt that Pugh and Steinfeld's performance in the scene had improved its quality. Bert described the scene in which Barton visits the commemorating plague for the Battle of New York as being a "very important scene" and an emotional experience for Barton as he is coping with the trauma from Natasha Romanoff / Black Widow's death. She also stated that "It was so important that there is a merging of the Clint Barton and the Ronin that he believes he's left behind. At the end of the [plaque] scene, it was important for us to have him lift that black hoody up, which is a hint to where we are going. It's Clint facing his dark past and putting on his dark past. He wants to put that behind him, but the fact of the matter is, if this doesn't go down the way he wants it to go down, he's willing to do anything to save and protect his family".

=== Casting ===
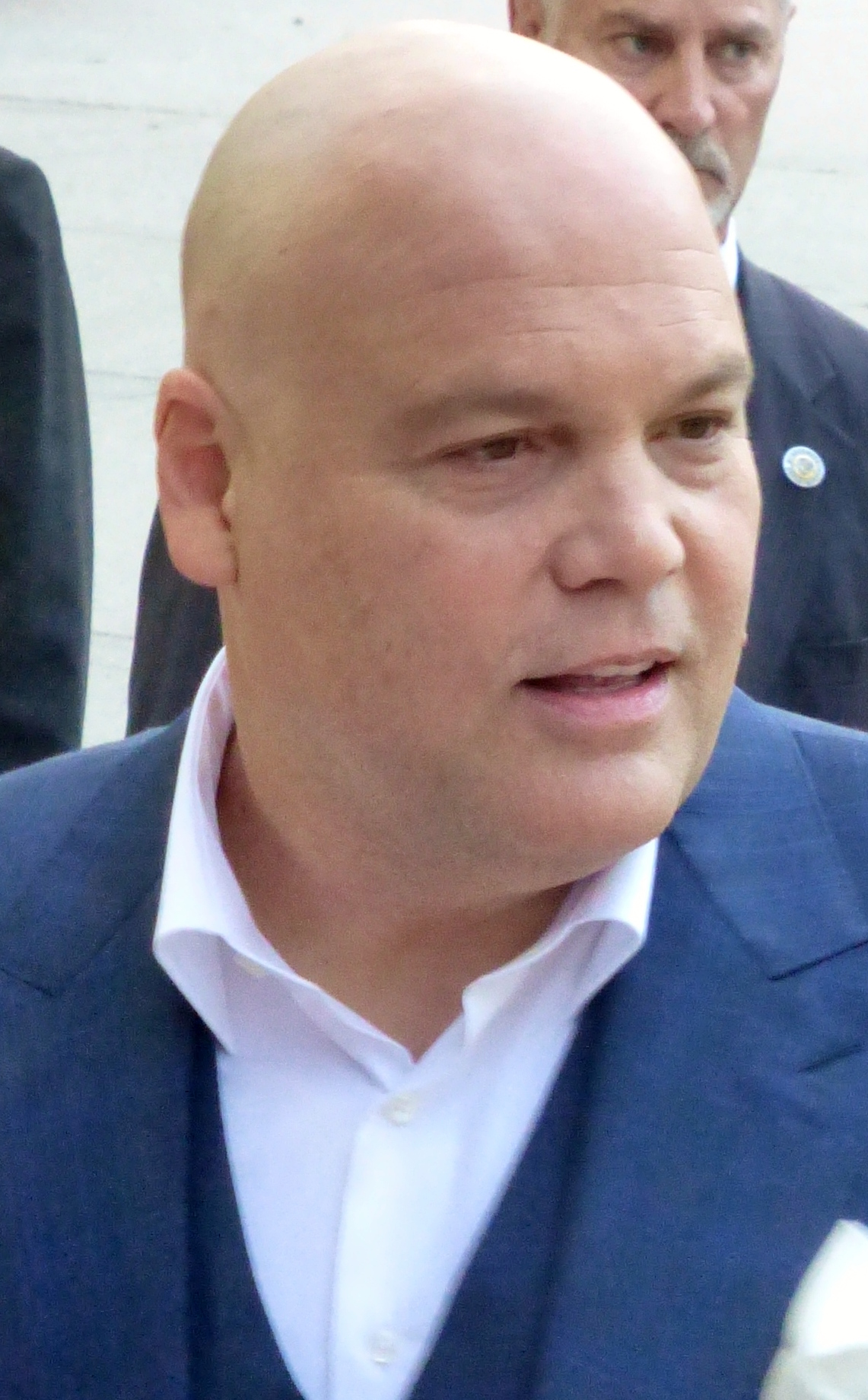
Vincent D'Onofrio reprises his role as Kingpin from the Marvel Television series Daredevil in the episode.

The episode stars Jeremy Renner as Clint Barton / Hawkeye, Hailee Steinfeld as Kate Bishop, Florence Pugh as Yelena Belova, Tony Dalton as Jack Duquesne, Fra Fee as Kazi, Vincent D'Onofrio as Wilson Fisk / Kingpin, Alaqua Cox as Maya Lopez, Aleks Paunovic as Ivan, Piotr Adamczyk as Thomas, Linda Cardellini as Laura Barton, and Vera Farmiga as Eleanor Bishop. D'Onofrio reprises his role as Fisk from the Marvel Television series Daredevil (2015–2018). Directors Bert and Bertie said they were excited to include the character due to the previous lack of connectivity between Marvel Studios and Marvel Television productions. On the decision to introduce Fisk with a grainy photo at the end of the episode, Bertie said "there've been different iterations of how Kingpin was revealed and this is the one that served the story". Also appearing are Clayton English as Grills, Ivan Mbakop as Detective Caudle, Franco Castan as Detective Rivera, Yssa Mei Panganiban as Sonya, and Annie Hamilton as Ana.

=== Design ===
External videos
- Marvel Studios' Hawkeye: Episode 5 End Credits Main On End Title Sequence presents the episode's main-on-end title sequence, YouTube video from Perception's channel

The episode's main-on-end title sequence was designed by Perception.

=== Filming ===
Speaking to the appearance of Belova in the episode, Bert and Bertie wanted to celebrate "this incredibly off-the-wall character" and how she would interact with the "naive, wide-eyed, super-smart, fierce, badass" Kate Bishop. Pugh provided insight to what she thought the character would be wearing when meeting with Bishop. Most of the conversation between Bishop and Belova at Bishop's apartment was improvised. Bertie said they "did a rehearsal, but every single thing was just perfect between them, and the improvisation that they brought to it was dynamite". The two also improvised where Bishop threw the hot sauce at Belova, and after that, Pugh decided to put it on the macaroni and eat it. When filming Belova's Blip scene, the production team had practically designed the bathroom set and filmed it using long, continuous shots as they wanted the viewers to be "experiencing it with Yelena" and also to "experience the Blip on a real human level". The camera operators had memorized Pugh's movements for the scene to film the scene with more ease.

For Kingpin's introduction to a Marvel Studios project, Bert and Bertie were not beholden to design aspects from Daredevil, but wanted to take into account the character's presence from the comics and Daredevil for this series.

== Marketing ==
After the episode's release, Marvel announced merchandise inspired by the episode as part of its weekly "Marvel Must Haves" promotion for each episode of the series, including apparel and a Belova Funko Pop.

== Reception ==
=== Audience viewership ===
According to Nielsen Media Research who measure the number of minutes watched by United States audiences on television sets, Hawkeye was the second-most watched original series across streaming services for the week of December 13–19 with 580 million minutes watched, which was up from the previous week's 527 million minutes watched. Hawkeye was the top streaming series for viewers in the United States for the week ending December 19 according to Whip Media's TV Time.

=== Critical response ===
The review aggregator website Rotten Tomatoes reports an 88% approval rating with an average rating of 8/10, based on 8 reviews.

Matt Purslow of IGN gave the episode an 8 out of 10, saying that leading up to the final scene, it felt like there were two parts of the episode moving at different speeds. He felt that although it was nice to see Belova, "it felt as if she were detracting from the bigger picture" with a large presence in the episode. However, he praised Pugh, calling her the standout of the episode. Overall, Purslow felt that the episode "satisfyingly stitches all its ideas together" by bringing together the separate plot threads "to reveal the thrilling mastermind behind it all: Vincent D'Onofrio's Wilson Fisk". Kaitlyn Booth of Bleeding Cool gave the episode a 9 out of 10, feeling that the episode did a great job of setting up the stakes for the finale. However, Booth said that by the end of the episode, it still seemed like a lot needed wrapped up in the final episode. Regarding the scene showing Belova get blipped, Booth thought that it was "interesting to see Marvel exploring what exactly people were doing and where they were when the blip happened".

Giving the episode a "B", Caroline Siede of The A.V. Club felt that Pugh stole the show and thought that "everything that made Yelena Belova such a hit in the Black Widow movie is back and arguably better here". Overall she felt that the episode was a "low-key character-driven affair" as it was focused on setting things up for the finale. Ross Bonaime of Collider gave the episode a "B+" and also praised Pugh's performance in the episode. He felt that the mac n cheese scene "blesses us with a tremendously fun conversation" between Belova and Bishop. Bonaime felt that Marvel had learned from their mistakes in the episode in terms of focusing more on the friendship Barton and Romanoff had. He also called the return of Kingpin an "electrifying development" after months of misdirection by D'Onofrio on Twitter.
