= Partners, Am I Right? =

- Hawkeye episode
- Promotional poster
- Episode no.: Episode 4
- Directed by: Bert and Bertie
- Written by: Heather Quinn; Erin Cancino
- Cinematography by: James Whitaker
- Editing by: Tim Roche
- Original release date: December 8, 2021
- Running time: 40 minutes

Cast
- Ava Russo as Lila Barton; Ben Sakamoto as Cooper Barton; Cade Woodward as Nathaniel Barton; Clayton English as Grills; Adetinpo Thomas as Wendy; Robert-Walker Branchaud as Orville; Adelle Drahos as Missy

Episode chronology
← Previous "Echoes"	Next → "Ronin"

"Partners, Am I Right?" is the fourth episode of the American television miniseries Hawkeye, based on Marvel Comics featuring the characters Clint Barton / Hawkeye and Kate Bishop. The episode follows Barton working with Bishop to learn more about a conspiracy. The episode is set in the Marvel Cinematic Universe (MCU), sharing continuity with the films of the franchise. It was written by Heather Quinn and Erin Cancino and directed by Bert and Bertie.

Jeremy Renner reprises his role as Clint Barton from the film series, with Hailee Steinfeld joining him as Kate Bishop. Florence Pugh, Tony Dalton, Alaqua Cox, Fra Fee, Linda Cardellini, and Vera Farmiga also star. Bert and Bertie joined the series in July 2020. Filming took place in New York City, with additional filming and soundstage work occurring in Atlanta, Georgia.

"Partners, Am I Right?" was released on Disney+ on December 8, 2021. Critics praised the episode for its chemistry and performances of Renner and Steinfeld, though like its previous episodes many felt that it was slow at times.

== Plot ==
After Kate Bishop is locked out of her mother Eleanor's laptop and Jack Duquesne threatens Clint Barton with the vigilante Ronin's sword, (Note: As depicted in the previous episode, "Echoes".) Barton defuses the situation by Eleanor and Duquesne recognizing him as an Avenger. Eleanor requests Barton to keep Kate out of the Tracksuit Mafia investigation and later contacts an unknown person to inform them about the situation. With the help of his wife Laura, Barton secretly recovers his sword and discovers that Duquesne is the CEO of Sloan Limited, a shell corporation that launders money for the Tracksuit Mafia, while Kate deduces that Barton was Ronin.

Barton locates second-in-command Kazi Kazimierczak and asks him to talk Maya Lopez out of her vendetta against Ronin while Kate enlists a group of LARPers in retrieving Barton's trick arrows. Afterwards, Laura informs Barton that the watch stolen by the Tracksuit Mafia is sending out tracking signals from an apartment building. Barton and Kate go to retrieve it, but find it in Maya's apartment, where she also keeps notes on Barton and his family. Maya attacks Kate while Barton is ambushed by a masked assassin.

A fight ensues between the four combatants, with Kate injuring Maya, which forces her to retreat, while Barton's unmasking of his assassin is revealed to be Yelena Belova, (Note: As a result of the mid-credit scene of Black Widow (2021).) who escapes. Barton decides that he cannot keep putting Kate in danger and breaks off their partnership.

== Production ==
=== Development ===
By April 2019, Marvel Studios was developing a Disney+ series starring Jeremy Renner's Clint Barton / Hawkeye from the Marvel Cinematic Universe (MCU) films, in which Barton would bequeath the mantle of Hawkeye to Kate Bishop. In July 2020, Bert and Bertie were hired to direct three episodes of Hawkeye. Executive producers for the series include head writer Jonathan Igla, Rhys Thomas, Brad Winderbaum, Trinh Tran, Victoria Alonso, Louis D'Esposito, and Kevin Feige. The fourth episode, titled "Partners, Am I Right?", was written by Heather Quinn & Erin Cancino, and was released on December 8, 2021.

=== Writing ===
Directors Bert and Bertie chose to introduce Yelena Belova into the episode as they wanted to make people wait but also felt it fit into the narrative which involved Clint and Kate trying to determine who the person was. While directing the scene, Bert and Bertie wanted to convey the scene from Bishop's perspective, who "has no concept of who she is, actually, and how she's going to fit into the story". They added that Pugh and Steinfeld's performance helped improve the scene's quality. The scene in which Bishop nearly falls of the building was meant to allude to Natasha Romanoff / Black Widow's death in Avengers: Endgame (2019), which the directors had watched and analyzed prior to production. They felt the scene was key to the story and wrote the scene in order to remind Barton of "the fragility of life and ... Natasha".

=== Casting ===
The episode stars Jeremy Renner as Clint Barton / Hawkeye, Hailee Steinfeld as Kate Bishop, Florence Pugh as Yelena Belova, Tony Dalton as Jack Duquesne, Alaqua Cox as Maya Lopez, Fra Fee as Kazi, Linda Cardellini as Laura Barton, and Vera Farmiga as Eleanor Bishop. Also appearing are Ava Russo as Lila Barton, Ben Sakamoto as Cooper Barton, Cade Woodward as Nathaniel Barton, Clayton English as Grills, Adetinpo Thomas as Wendy, Robert-Walker Branchaud as Orville, and Adelle Drahos as Missy. Scarlett Johansson appears as Natasha Romanoff / Black Widow in archive footage from Endgame.

=== Filming and design ===
Filming began in early December 2020 in New York City, including at the Lotte New York Palace Hotel. Additional filming took place at Trilith Studios and Tyler Perry Studios in Atlanta, Georgia. The scene where Bishop nearly fell of the building was filmed on a rooftop in New York, as they felt it had replicated the "kind of like that epic cliff of Vormir". They had filmed and directed the scene to replicate the cinematography from Endgame.

The episode's main-on-end title sequence was designed by Perception.

== Marketing ==
After the episode's release, Marvel announced merchandise inspired by the episode as part of its weekly "Marvel Must Haves" promotion for each episode of the series, including apparel, and Clint Barton and Kate Bishop in their Christmas sweaters Funko Pops for Barton and Bishop.

== Reception ==
=== Audience viewership ===
According to Nielsen Media Research who measure the number of minutes watched by United States audiences on television sets, Hawkeye was the second-most watched original series across streaming services for the week of December 6–12 with 527 million minutes watched, which was down from the previous week's 560 million minutes watched. Hawkeye was the top streaming series for viewers in the United States for the week ending December 12 according to Whip Media's TV Time.

=== Critical response ===
The review aggregator website Rotten Tomatoes reports a 100% approval rating with an average rating of 7.7/10, based on 15 reviews.

Caroline Siede of The A.V. Club gave the episode a "B", saying "Hawkeye slows things down for a character-driven hour that could've used a little more oomph". She felt that the reveal of Belova only works for those who either watched Black Widow or hadn't seen the casting news beforehand. Otherwise, she felt "it'll either lack a little surprise, because they knew this was coming; or lack a sense of payoff, because they don't know who she is". Siede gave credit to the series for "making Natasha's death feel meaningful in a way nothing else in the MCU really has—not even her own goddamn movie". She felt the episode was clunky in places, but overall enjoyed the episode. Ross Bonaime of Collider gave the episode an "A-" and was fine with the episode slowing things down after the action packed previous episode, as it allowed for "some Christmas cheer and great characters moments". He felt that the Disney+ MCU shows were largely meant to flesh out characters who had not had that opportunity in the films because the shows could do it by slowing things down, while the movies could not afford to do that. Bonaime felt like "Partners, Am I Right?" may have been the best episode of the series up to this point because of "Kate Bishop trying to save the holidays". He praised the dynamic between Renner and Steinfeld, as "having them play off each other" with the resulting charm and humor was what made the episode so good.

Matt Purslow of IGN felt like the series overall had allowed for Barton to truly open up compared to past appearances, but this episode "really digs deeper into what it means to be Hawkeye". Purslow felt that even with less action than the previous episode, "Partners, Am I Right?" "builds on the emotional heart" of the series. Purslow notes that the momentum of the plot slowed down so that Barton and Bishop could hang out, which allowed Barton to "open up more than he's ever done". He said despite that, the episode was not gloomy thanks to Bishop's festive cheer. With the fight at the end of the episode, Purslow felt that Bert and Bertie "don't quite hit the stylish highs" of the previous episode, even with the introduction of Belova. He gave the episode an 8 out of 10, saying "Hawkeye's fourth episode takes a closer look at Clint's darker side, while also kicking off a wider MCU crossover." Kirsten Howard from Den of Geek felt the "heart-wrenching" scene with Bishop hanging off the side of the building was "too much for [Barton] to cope with", as he tried to cut ties with Bishop to protect her. Howard felt that the added score from Avengers: Endgame made the scene more emotional, as it was so similar to the situation with Romanoff. Giving the episode a 3.5 out of 5, Howard said "despite an episode packed with legwork, Hawkeye remains delightful".
