= List of Hawkeye characters =

List of Hawkeye characters may refer to:

- Hawkeye (comics) – various Marvel Comics characters known as the superhero Hawkeye
- List of Hawkeye supporting characters – comic book characters related to the Marvel Comics superhero
- List of Hawkeye (miniseries) characters – characters appearing in the 2021 Marvel Cinematic Universe television series Hawkeye
