= Clara Stack =

American actress (born 2010)

- Born: October 19, 2010 (age 16)
- Citizenship: United States
- Years active: 2019–present
- Notable work: It: Welcome to Derry
- Awards: Saturn Award for Best Younger Performer (Nomination)

Clara Stack (born October 19th, 2010) is an American actress, best known for her portrayal as Lilly Bainbridge in the HBO series It: Welcome to Derry.

== Early life ==
Clara Stack was born in New York on October 19, 2010. At a young age, she had an interest in acting since she performed in local theatre productions. Her early stage experience helped her to improve her acting talent.

== Career ==
Stack made her acting debut on the American drama series Madam Secretary and 2025 Comedy Film, Almost Family. In 2021, she gained wider recognition for portraying the young version Kate Bishop in the Disney+ series Hawkeye.

In 2023, she played the role of Rose in the Disney Original Film The Naughty Nine. In 2025, she portrayed the role of Lilly Bainbridge in the HBO horror series It: Welcome to Derry, a prequel for the movie It (2017) and Stephen King's It universe.

== Filmography ==
=== Film ===
Year	Title	Role	Notes
2023	The Naughty Nine	Rose Wingert	

=== Television ===
Year	Title	Role	Notes
2019	Madam Seretary	Corra	Episode: Something Better
2019	Bull	Hannah Kelly	Episode: When the Rains Came
2019	Almost Family	Esther	Episode: Kosher AF
2021	Hawkeye	Little Kate Bishop	Episode: Never Meet Your Heroes
2023	The Marvelous Mrs. Maisel	Francesca	Episode: The Testi-Roastial
2025	It: Welcome to Derry	Lilly Bainbridge	Main Role
