= Kate Bishop (Marvel Cinematic Universe) =

Character portrayed by Hailee Steinfeld

- Marvel Cinematic Universe character
- Hailee Steinfeld as Kate Bishop in the Hawkeye episode "So This Is Christmas?"
- First appearance: "Never Meet Your Heroes"; Hawkeye; (2021)
- Based on: Kate Bishop by: Allan Heinberg; Jim Cheung
- Adapted by: Jonathan Igla
- Portrayed by: Hailee Steinfeld; Clara Stack (young)

In-universe information
- Full name: Katherine Elizabeth Bishop
- Aliases: Hawkeye; Ronin
- Nickname: Kate
- Species: Human
- Weapon: Bow and arrow; Quiver
- Family: Eleanor Bishop (mother); Derek Bishop (father); Lucky (pet)
- Origin: Manhattan, New York, United States
- Nationality: American

Katherine Elizabeth Bishop is a character portrayed by Hailee Steinfeld in the Marvel Cinematic Universe (MCU) media franchise based on the Marvel Comics character of the same name. Bishop is depicted as a champion archer who grew up idolizing Avenger Clint Barton after he inadvertently saved her life during the Battle of New York.

Years later, she meets him and partners with him to uncover a criminal conspiracy and becomes his protégé. Bishop helps Barton confront those trying to take him down, such as the Tracksuit Mafia's boss, Maya Lopez, and the assassin Yelena Belova. Bishop discovers that her mother was secretly conspiring with Wilson Fisk. She is later recruited by Kamala Khan, who asked her to join her team of young superheroes.

Steinfeld first appeared as the character in the Disney+ miniseries Hawkeye (2021). She reprised the role for a cameo appearance in the film The Marvels (2023). She also voiced alternate versions of the character in the third season of the animated television series What If...? (2024) as well as Marvel Zombies (2025). Steinfeld's portrayal has been well received by fans and critics. Clara Stack plays a young version of the character in Hawkeye.

== Concept and creation ==
Kate Bishop was created by Allan Heinberg and Jim Cheung for Young Avengers #1 (April 2005), and becomes a founding member of the titular team using Clint Barton's arrows as a weapon. Because Barton had sacrificed himself in Avengers #502, Captain America gifted her the Hawkeye mantle. Prior to this, as a teenager, she was assaulted in Central Park which led her to take up intense combat training and self-defense to heal from the trauma she felt afterwards. In later appearances after Barton's revival, she developed a mentor-mentee relationship with him and was a main eponymous character in Matt Fraction and David Aja's series Hawkeye (2012), the "All-New Hawkeye" series by Jeff Lemire and Ramon Perez (2015), a solo 16-issue Hawkeye series written by Kelly Thompson from 2016 to 2018 and an upcoming 2021 five-part miniseries by Marieke Nijkamp and Enid Balám.

Ben Pearson of /Film found it that Bishop's comic interpretation made her out as being "a young, headstrong woman, out to make a name for herself and refusing to take shit from anyone", and Renner relented that Bishop was "a better version of me and the sentiment of that is the fiber of what Hawkeye is, adding that he was delighted to shepherd an "amazing character" onscreen. He believed that Bishop's involvement in Hawkeye shows how Barton is "a superhero without superpowers and [how he gets to] teach someone else to be a superhero without super powers" in Bishop. Paul Tassi of Forbes stated that Marvel was "betting big" on Bishop's involvement in the MCU with her being a "force for them, perhaps bigger than [Renner's Barton] Hawkeye himself ever was."

== Casting ==
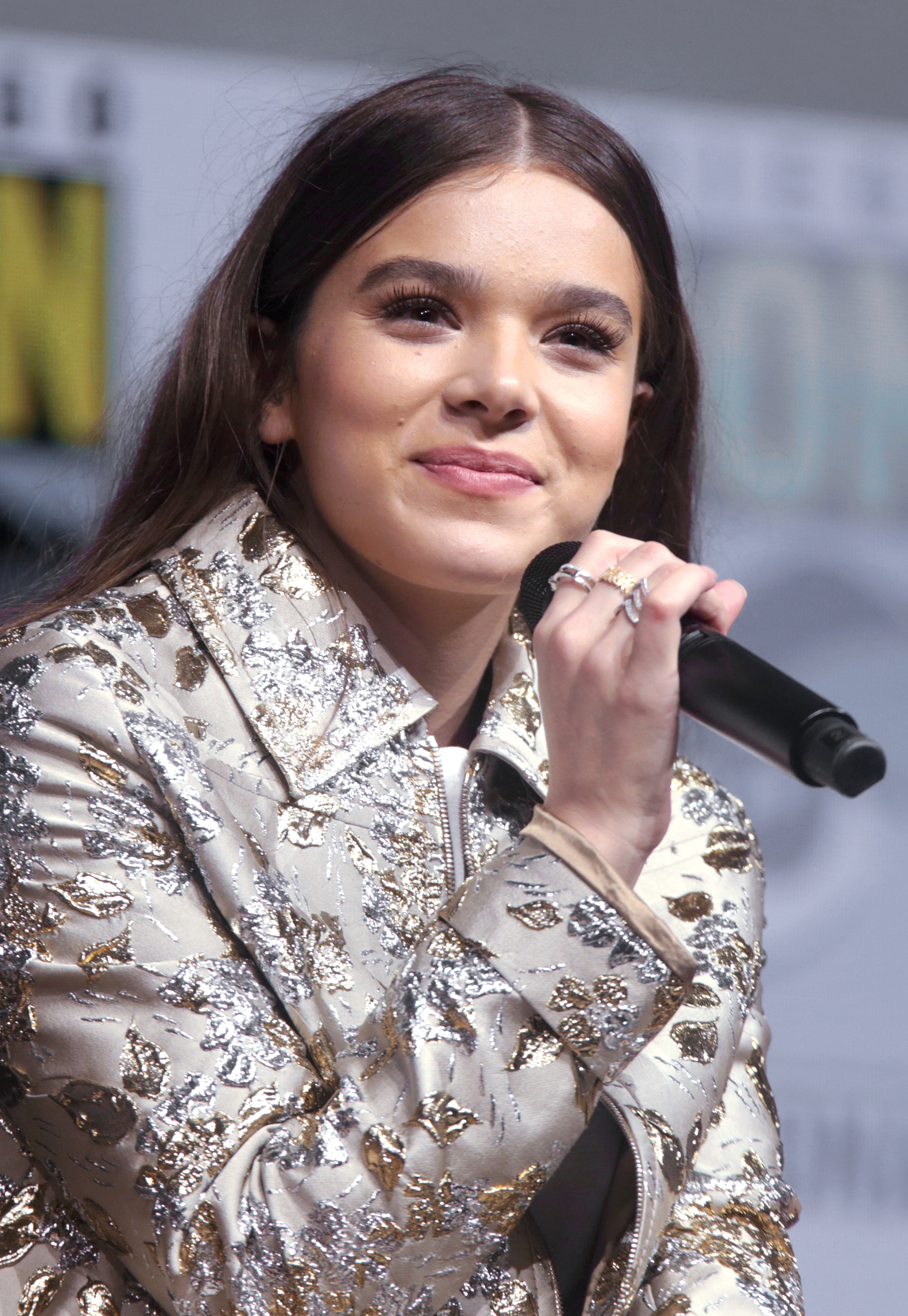
Hailee Steinfeld pictured at the 2018 San Diego Comic Con

In April 2019, early reports were released indicating plans for a Disney+ Hawkeye property featuring Barton "passing the torch" to Bishop, which was later officially announced at San Diego Comic-Con in the following July. By early September 2019, Hailee Steinfeld had been offered the role of Kate Bishop, but had not yet signed on for the series a month later. Variety reported one reason for this was a non-compete clause in her contract with Apple TV+ for starring in the series Dickinson, something Variety felt Steinfeld would be able to negotiate out of. No other actresses had been approached for the role of Bishop. When asked about her starring in the series shortly after, Steinfeld said it was "not something that's necessarily happening", and was confirmed as Bishop by December 2020 in part due to scheduling issues with Dickinson season 3 being freed up due to the COVID-19 pandemic; this also allowed Steinfeld to better keep the secret until her official casting was revealed. Finn Jones, who played Danny Rand / Iron Fist in prior Marvel Television properties and co-starred alongside Steinfeld in season 2 of Dickinson encouraged her to take the role, believing that she should "'do it, definitely. Be a part of the Marvel world. It's such a wonderful thing to say that you've been a part of'...I was like 'do it, and you won't regret it.'" Jones furthered support for Steinfeld playing the role by saying "It's wonderful to see that she's now in that world...she deserves it. She's such an amazing performer – and a great contribution to the Marvel Universe." Hawkeye showrunner Jonathan Igla called her casting "absolutely perfect".

Renner took it upon himself to teach Steinfeld the avenues of a big-budget Marvel production and how the world of superheroes translates into real-life set pieces, feeling it was his role to introduce her to the MCU. "Outside of acting in the thing, I was protecting her and giving her the CliffsNotes on how it goes with this kind of filmmaking," Renner stated, adding that he "just wanted to protect her, because there's a lot of physical stuff" involved. He lauded Marvel's decision to cast her as Bishop, remarking that "she's a wonderful actress, a wonderful human...[there's a lot of] cool stuff that she's able to do." Steinfeld was already a fan of Bishop and the comics, but found that in her research for the show she was able to continually "[discover] these elements of Kate Bishop that are in [the comics] that we're bringing to life in the show, and other elements of the comics." She was also appreciative of the way the character's role tied into and helped flesh out the MCU at large.

Steinfeld did not audition for the role, with Kevin Feige stating: "We were very, very lucky that Hailee was open to this because we very much believed that she was sort of the prototype for the character, and as occasionally happens, the dream version of the character agrees to do it."

Clara Stack plays a young version of the character in Hawkeye.

Steinfeld reprised her role for a cameo appearance in the film The Marvels (2023) and voiced alternate versions of the character in the third season of the animated series What If...? (2024) and in Marvel Zombies (2025).

== Characterization ==
=== Traits and athleticism ===
Steinfeld described Bishop as a "smart and witty badass" with physical abilities that are "through the roof". To prepare herself for Bishop's athletic prowess, she was trained in basic archery sessions. When she is introduced into the show, Bishop is a 22-year-old fangirl of Barton's who has a "wonderfully annoying and equally charming manner about her." The relationship between her and Barton was described as chaotic from the "onslaught of problems" she brings into his life initially, but also a growing mutual respect for one another as she formally becomes Barton's protégée. She first draws Barton's attention when she is pictured on television disguised as Ronin, Barton's previous mercenary alter ego. Steinfeld said that Bishop was "very human...rooted in human strength and strength of mind. She's self-taught, very disciplined, and very determined." She likened the character to Emily Dickinson, who she had been portraying right before filming Hawkeye, in that Bishop is also a "strong and determined and independent and driven female character" so the move from one character to another felt smooth. She would later call Bishop "a character that I would have loved to have had growing up — somebody who is completely ambitious, driven and disciplined, and takes it upon herself to do whatever it is she has to do to achieve her goals."

Steinfeld's casting in the series and training led her to develop a passion for archery, much like the character she portrays. Of this, she said: "As far as a bow and arrow goes...it's something that I genuinely, really enjoy. Not something I've ever picked up, a bow, before this project...[but] it's truly therapeutic and just really amazing. Not something I'd ever see myself doing. But here I am! And I absolutely love it." In reaction to set photos of the film, Taylor Walston of Archery 360 commented that "Steinfeld's form is solid. Her fingers on the bowstring are nice and relaxed, and she is loosely holding the grip between her thumb and first finger, with her other fingers relaxed, in an early demonstration of proper form."

=== Relationship with Barton ===
Renner likened her and Barton's dynamic to a father-daughter relationship, particularly between Barton and his own daughter Lila Barton. Steinfeld added that "It was very fun to implement the banter [between Barton and Bishop]...that was something Jeremy and I found very quickly...there are these tragic events taking place and there's still this witty, quick banter that they seem to find." In changing Bishop's backstory and events surrounding her initial meeting with Barton, Steinfeld said that " [This version of] Kate, as a young woman growing up in New York City, can walk down the street and own herself and her strength. She can take anybody on, and [we wanted that to be] because she decided for herself that that was something she wanted to be able to do." Detailing their unique dynamic, Igla added that "I'm always interested in contrasts, and Kate and Clint are a real study in contrasts...they're opposites. Kate aspires to be a superhero, as opposed to Clint who is a superhero and doesn't want to be one. And I felt like if somebody was going to come along and teach an aspiring superhero about what it means to be a superhero, about the reality of it, it should be somebody who has a much more ambivalent relationship to it." Touching on the choice to include the show's opening sequence where Bishop watches Barton during the Battle of New York, Igla stated: "I wanted to pair the death of Kate's father with her seeing Hawkeye. Because the trauma of losing a parent, and also an alien invasion right outside your window...[is a] traumatizing event. Seeing [Barton] who is not out of control in that moment, but seems completely in control...[for] Kate, somebody who doesn't have superpowers, that felt like the type of thing that would make a lifelong lasting mark on a child."

Hawkeye executive producer Trinh Tran said Barton was Bishop's "North Star", adding that "from a young age, Kate [has had a] love for her idol, Hawkeye." Her motivation to become a hero was due to seeing how Barton could be "a hero and a mere human doing superhuman things, but above everything else, he always stands up for the little guy and protects those in need" which led her to "put herself through intense training, studying various sports, including archery and martial arts." Of their back-and-forth relationship, TVLine called it full of "action and punchy tête-à-têtes" with extra notice of its similarity to the Aja and Fraction Hawkeye run that partially inspired the show.

=== Relationship with Eleanor ===
Of Bishop's mother Eleanor, it was stated that Eleanor would be "pretty evil; and she doesn't appear to have a whit of '80s frumpy ex-nun to her character...she's just going to be a wealthy, amoral jerk" leading to a rift in their relationship. Tranh offered insight into the decision to include Bishop's mother in the show, saying that "we haven't had many opportunities to explore a mother-daughter relationship in the MCU...I find interesting is that there is a lot of, I guess, fresh territory that we can go to for the relationship for the two of them." Furthering her comments, she added that "[Eleanor] thinks she knows what is best for Kate, but Kate is you've seen in the comics is sometimes hard-headed, and she speaks her mind...there could be opposing opinions in who she is...[there is a] more personal, more emotional [connection] between the two characters that we wanted to explore." After the realization that Eleanor was working with Kingpin and ordered Barton's assassination at the hands of Yelena Belova, Steinfeld called Bishop's state "completely broken and confused and absolutely lost. She doesn't know who to trust or who to look to...the one person that she's been tirelessly trying to protect is now someone that she might need to be protected against." Touching on Bishop's encounter with Kingpin, Steinfeld said: "If it didn't feel real before, it's real now. After all the partner talk and jokes that have been thrown around, now she has the opportunity to step up to the plate [and] come to her senses as quickly as she possibly can after learning this information and puts her head down and does what she has to do."

== Fictional character biography ==
=== Early life ===
Bishop was born into the wealthy Bishop family of New York City, headed by her mother Eleanor and father Derek. In 2012, her penthouse came under attack by the Chitauri, but she is saved by Clint Barton. After witnessing him fighting against the Chitauri troops during the Battle of New York, she quickly began to idolize him just as Eleanor found her and they escaped from the collapsing house. During the invasion, Derek is killed. At his funeral, Bishop decided to follow her idol's footsteps and vowed to become a hero like Barton, which led to her training in archery, fencing, gymnastics and martial arts, winning many trophies and medals. In 2018, she survives the Blip.

=== Partnering with Clint Barton ===
In 2024, on her last day at college before Christmas break, she and her friends go to the old Stane Tower where she shoots her arrows at it, accidentally destroying the bell. Back at home, Bishop attends a charity auction gala with her mother, the head of Bishop Security. She learns her mother is engaged to Jack Duquesne. During the gala, she goes outside and meets a golden retriever, who she later names Lucky, and discovers an underground black market auction selling remnants from the destroyed Avengers Compound with Duquesne and his uncle Armand Duquesne III in attendance. Bishop then witnesses the Tracksuit Mafia attack the auction and to hide her identity, dons the Ronin suit. She fights them, escapes and rescues Lucky from the Mafia and oncoming traffic, but is recognized by Kazi Kazimierczak, the Mafia's lieutenant. Bishop adopts Lucky and takes him to her apartment before leaving and finding out Duquesne III was murdered in his house. After leaving the house, she is attacked by the Mafia, but is saved by Barton, who confronts her about the Ronin suit.

They take refuge in Bishop's apartment but are ambushed again by the Mafia, which leads her, Lucky, and Barton to go on the run and take refuge in Bishop's aunt's apartment. The next day, Bishop goes to Bishop Security headquarters to begin work and becomes suspicious of Duquesne. She discovers that he is an expert swordsman, leading her to believe he was the killer. After learning Barton has been taken by the Mafia, she tracks his phone location and unsuccessfully attempts to save him, resulting in herself getting captured.

Barton and Bishop are confronted by Maya Lopez, the Mafia's boss who is seeking revenge for the murder of her father at the hands of Ronin. Bishop is attacked by Lopez, who believes she is the Ronin. With Barton's help, they manage to escape and after a car chase in which she uses Barton's trick arrows to fend off the Mafia, including an arrow from Scott Lang, manage to escape onto the subway. The next day, Bishop, Barton, and Lucky get Barton a new hearing aid and get breakfast before going to her mother's penthouse. Bishop accesses Bishop Security's criminal database, finding that the Mafia are connected to a shell company called Sloane Limited, but gets locked out.

=== Discovering the truth ===
Bishop and Barton sit down to talk with her mother and Duquesne, with her mother disapproving Bishop partnering with Barton. After he leaves, Bishop stays behind with Lucky. Later, after getting Christmas movies, food, and decorations, Bishop and Lucky return to her aunt's apartment and throw Barton a small Christmas party. She learns from him that Duquesne is the CEO of Sloane Limited. Also that night, Bishop deduces that Barton is Ronin, but quickly forgives him when she realizes the pain he felt after losing his family during the Blip. The next day, under Barton's request, Bishop and Lucky go to Central Park and ask for assistance from LARPers in retrieving Barton's arrows. Bishop and Lucky go with them back to the apartment of fellow LARPer, Grills. Barton meets them there and is given his arrows back. Barton and Bishop then break into Lopez's apartment to locate a watch stolen at the auction, but are attacked by Lopez and Black Widow assassin, Yelena Belova. Bishop is told to leave by Barton who cuts ties with her when he realizes how dangerous their situation has gotten.

Bishop returns to her mother's penthouse where she is comforted by her mother. She returns to her apartment, but is confronted by Belova, who reveals that she was hired to kill Barton. Belova attempts to convince Bishop that Barton is not the hero that Bishop worships, but Bishop rebuffs this. Bishop returns to the penthouse and calls Barton, choosing to help him whether he wanted it or not, but is unsuccessful in getting him. She tracks Barton's phone location and helps him fight off Lopez, before they convene at Grills' apartment. While playing with Lucky, she receives a message from Belova telling her that her mother arranged Barton's death and a video revealing her mother meeting with Wilson Fisk, the head of the Mafia and organized crime in New York City.

=== Facing Kingpin ===
After listening to the video of Fisk, Bishop and Barton retrieve additional arrows and make more trick arrows. That night, they attend the annual Bishop Christmas party hosted by her mother at Rockefeller Center. Bishop locates her mother, who reveals she cut ties with Fisk. Bishop then intercepts Belova, who still intends to kill Barton, and fights her but Belova escapes. She and Barton, as well as Duquesne and the LARPers, fight off the Mafia outside the Center. Afterwards, she finds her mother and fights Fisk but is overpowered, leading her to knock him out with explosive arrows. When the police arrive to arrest her mother for her crimes, Bishop finds it hard to reconcile with her despite knowing everything she did was for her, as she was aware that her mother's actions were still wrong. Bishop regroups with Barton who tells her she was brave to fight Fisk alone. The next day, she, Barton, and Lucky leave for Iowa to have Christmas at the Barton family farm. As she and Lucky spend time with Barton's family as they open presents, she is called by Barton to come outside where he burns the Ronin suit and tries to find a hero name for her.

=== Meeting Kamala Khan ===
Sometime later, Bishop and Lucky returned to New York City and began living in a new apartment. In late 2026, Bishop returns to her apartment one night with pizza for Lucky when she finds Kamala Khan inside. Khan introduces herself and pulls out a S.A.B.E.R. tablet, revealing that she is forming a team of young heroes, mentioning Cassie Lang, and asks Bishop to join.

== Alternate versions ==
Other versions of Kate Bishop are depicted in the alternate realities of the MCU multiverse.

=== 1872 cowgirl ===
In an alternate American frontier 1872, Kate Bishop lived in the Mojave Desert and was a cowgirl. Her parents were killed by Sonny Burch, under the Hood's command. Bishop owned a horse as her pet and partnered with Xu Shang-Chi to rescue people kidnapped by the Hood. One day, Bishop and Shang-Chi broke into a saloon and confronted John Walker about the Hood's whereabouts. After defeating the men in the saloon, she and Shang-Chi discovered a destroyed town and rescued a Chinese boy who told them about a mysterious train and asked to join them. They located the train and went onboard where they were confronted by Burch and his men. When the train arrived at the Hood's location, Bishop was instructed to stay inside and became enthralled by Burch's hypnotic watch. She broke out of the trance after a bell rang and defeated Burch's men while planning to make Burch suffer. She then left the train and saved Shang-Chi by shooting the Hood, which turned out to be Shang-Chi's sister. Just then, Bishop showed remorse, for which Shang-Chi forgave her, claiming that she did not kill Xialing, "the Hood did". She and Shang-Chi took Jun-Fan to a village and set off to embark on another adventure as they rode off into the sunset.

=== Zombie outbreak ===
In an alternate universe where a zombie plague infected the world, Kate Bishop was among the survivors of the infection, and formed a group with Riri Williams and Kamala Khan. Upon finding a shrunken device inside of a zombie S.H.I.E.L.D. agent, the trio deduced that the device may be able to help the world. To confirm this, they traveled to a S.H.I.E.L.D. base located in Ohio. Along the way, they encountered a storm and crater in the mountains caused from the fighting between a zombie Carol Danvers and Ikaris. Bishop attempts to kill the former with a trick arrow she recovered from Zombie Clint Barton, only to learn it was a non-lethal confetti arrow. Bishop was subsequently vaporized by Danvers's energy blasts.

== Reception ==
Initial reception for Hawkeye's first two episodes included heavy praise towards Steinfeld's portrayal of Bishop, about how she "[brought] the humor and the determination to her character" with comments from critics ranging from saying that there is "no chance fans don't immediately fall in love with her character" by Steve Weintraub from Collider to other varied comments saying that "Eager Kate's dynamic with grumpy Clint is especially great" and her "energized" performance. Erik Kain of Forbes said that "Hailee Steinfeld is great as Kate Bishop. Last thing I saw her in was Bumblebee... [and here] she's a little more confident and self-assured and more of a badass, and she does all that very well."

Matt Purslow from IGN, in a review for Hawkeye's first two episodes, said that Bishop is "a delightfully energetic force who runs before she can walk. Her archery skills are matched only by her ability to arrive in the wrong place at the wrong time" and praised the show's faithfulness to her comic book counterpart. He said that Bishop "steals the show — Steinfeld['s performance is] a magnetic joy — but her junior hero also fires significantly more arrows over the premiere, both physically and metaphorically" while taking note of the strong Barton-Bishop dynamic. In his review of "Ronin", Purslow also lauded the banter between Bishop and Belova in their first meeting. In a review for "Ronin", Alan Sepinwall of Rolling Stone took note of Bishop's idol worship of Barton and how upon discovering Barton was Ronin she still stands by him, adding that the character was layered by the way she "is not so different from Clint and Maya, either, in that she can also be blinded and manipulated." In a review for Hawkeye episode 4, "Partners, Am I Right?", Chancellor Agard commended the growing character dynamics between Barton and Bishop, and how Barton has come to care for her while Bishop learns more about the darker side of her mentor's past.

=== Accolades ===
Year	Work	Award	Category	Result	Ref.
2022	Hawkeye	Critics' Choice Super Awards	Best Actress in a Superhero Series	Nominated	
2022	Hawkeye	Kids' Choice Awards	Favorite Female TV Star (Family)	Nominated	
2022	Hawkeye	Hollywood Critics Association TV Awards	Best Actress in a Streaming Series, Comedy	Nominated	
2022	Hawkeye	Saturn Awards	Best Performance by a Younger Actor in a Streaming Television Series	Nominated	

== In other media ==
In 2022, Netmarble released the Hawkeye incarnation of Kate Bishop in Marvel: Future Fight, while Hasbro released a Kate Bishop action figure based on Hawkeye as part of the Marvel Legends action figure line.

== See also ==
- Characters of the Marvel Cinematic Universe
- Gwen Stacy (Spider-Verse)
