= Clint Barton (Marvel Cinematic Universe) =

Character in the Marvel Cinematic Universe

- Marvel Cinematic Universe character
- Jeremy Renner as Clint Barton / Hawkeye in The Avengers (2012)
- First appearance: Thor (2011)
- Based on: Hawkeye by: Stan Lee; Don Heck
- Adapted by: J. Michael Straczynski; Mark Protosevich; Ashley Miller; Zack Stentz; Don Payne
- Portrayed by: Jeremy Renner

In-universe information
- Full name: Clinton Francis Barton
- Aliases: Hawkeye; Ronin
- Species: Human
- Occupation: Avenger; Vigilante; Agent of S.H.I.E.L.D.
- Affiliation: Avengers; S.H.I.E.L.D.; S.T.R.I.K.E.
- Weapon: Bow and quiver; Compound and Recurve bows; Wristbow; Retractable katana (as Ronin); Shuriken (as Ronin); Combat knives; Collapsible baton; Various trick arrows; Various firearms
- Family: Edith Barton (mother)
- Spouse: Laura Barton
- Children: Cooper Barton; Lila Barton; Nathaniel Barton
- Nationality: American

Clinton Francis Barton is a fictional character portrayed by Jeremy Renner in the Marvel Cinematic Universe (MCU) media franchise—based on the Marvel Comics character of the same name—more commonly known by his alias, Hawkeye. Barton is depicted as an expert marksman, archer, and hand-to-hand combatant, with his preferred weapon being a recurve bow. Barton, an agent of S.H.I.E.L.D., is sent to kill Natasha Romanoff but decides to recruit and befriend her instead.

Barton becomes a founding member of the Avengers after being recruited by Steve Rogers, participating in the Battle of New York, the HYDRA uprising, and the conflict against Ultron. Barton sides with Rogers during the Avengers' internal conflict over the Sokovia Accords; he is placed on house arrest as a result. After Barton's family is decimated during the Blip, he becomes a vigilante and violently dismantles organized crime across the world as Ronin. He rejoins the Avengers during their mission to undo Thanos' actions using time travel; Barton attains the Soul Stone after Romanoff sacrifices herself to obtain it. Barton and his allies successfully restore the trillions of lives lost to Thanos, and he participates in the final and subsequently victorious battle against an alternate-timeline version of him. After reuniting with his restored family, his time as Ronin causes continued conflicts with various elements of organized crime, and he takes in a protégé named Kate Bishop.

Barton's first appearance was a brief cameo in Thor (2011), but he became a central figure of the MCU, appearing in five films as of 2024 and has the lead role in the miniseries Hawkeye (2021).

Alternate versions of Barton from within the multiverse also appear in the animated series What If...? (2021), with Renner reprising the role.

== Fictional character biography ==
=== Agent of S.H.I.E.L.D. ===
Working as a S.H.I.E.L.D. agent, Barton is sent to kill Natasha Romanoff, but instead recruits her. (Note: As stated by Barton in the fourth episode of Hawkeye (2021).) They become close friends and serve on various missions together, including one in Budapest, where Romanoff attempts to kill General Dreykov. (Note: As depicted in a flashback in Black Widow (2021).) At some point, Barton marries Laura Barton. Nick Fury assists him in setting up a safehouse for his family on a farm in rural Iowa. (Note: As stated by Barton during the events of Avengers: Age of Ultron (2015).)

In 2010, Barton was sent on a mission in New Mexico. There he arms himself with a compound bow and prepared to kill Thor to keep him from retrieving Mjolnir. However, after watching Thor fail to lift the hammer, he chose not to.

=== Battle of New York ===
In 2012, Barton is working at a remote S.H.I.E.L.D. research facility with Fury when Loki arrives and uses his scepter to put Barton under mind control and steal the Tesseract. They travel to Stuttgart, where Barton steals iridium needed to stabilize the Tesseract's power while Loki causes a distraction. Loki allows himself to be captured and taken to the S.H.I.E.L.D. Helicarrier, which Barton attacks with other mind controlled agents. Aboard the Helicarrier, Barton fights Romanoff, who knocks him out, breaking Loki's control. Romanoff helps him recover. Barton is recruited by Steve Rogers and becomes a founding member of the Avengers with Rogers, Romanoff, Tony Stark, Bruce Banner, and Thor. He participates in the battle in New York City against the Chitauri and helps defeat Loki at Stark Tower. Barton joins the team to a diner where they eat in silence. After the team sees Thor and Loki off in Central Park, he and Romanoff drive off together.

=== Age of Ultron ===
In 2015, Barton, Romanoff, Stark, Rogers, Banner, and Thor attack a Hydra facility in Sokovia in an effort to retrieve the scepter. However, Barton is seriously injured by Pietro Maximoff and a Hydra weapon, but is healed by Dr. Helen Cho at the Avengers Tower. Barton attends the Avengers' celebratory party, meeting James Rhodes and Sam Wilson, and tries and fails to lift Mjolnir. Barton witnesses Ultron's first attack at the Tower and his escape with the scepter. Barton and the others travel to Johannesburg, where they try to stop him, but all, except Barton, are enthralled by Wanda Maximoff's powers. Barton takes the defeated team to his house where it is revealed to the team that he has a pregnant wife named Laura and children named Cooper and Lila. There, Fury arrives and motivates the team to assemble and stop Ultron.

Barton, Romanoff, and Rogers travel to Seoul to stop Ultron from uploading his network into a vibranium body powered by the Mind Stone. They succeed and Barton transports the sentient body back to the Avengers Tower. He also tracks a captured Romanoff's signal in Sokovia. After Vision is awakened, Barton and the others return to Sokovia to stop Ultron. There, Barton reunites with Romanoff, participates in the battle against Ultron, convinces Maximoff to become an Avenger, and is saved by Pietro who sacrifices his life to shield Barton and a Sokovian child from Ultron's gunfire. After the battle, Barton goes into retirement and returns home, where he and Laura name their newborn son Nathaniel Pietro Barton, in honor of Romanoff and Pietro.

=== Sokovia Accords ===
In 2016, Barton returns from retirement to help Rogers in his opposition to United Nations control of the Avengers via the Sokovia Accords. He goes to the Avengers Compound to retrieve Maximoff, but is confronted by Vision, until Maximoff incapacitates him. Barton and Maximoff then recruit Scott Lang and travel to the Leipzig/Halle airport in Germany to join Rogers, Wilson, and Bucky Barnes. However, they are intercepted by Stark's team consisting of Rhodes, Romanoff, Peter Parker, T'Challa, and Vision. After Rogers and Barnes escape, Barton, Wilson, Maximoff, and Lang are taken to the Raft. When Stark visits, Barton openly berates him. Later, Rogers breaks him, Lang, Wilson, and Maximoff out, and he and Lang negotiate deals with the U.S. government in accordance with the accords to receive a term of house arrest instead. (Note: As mentioned in Avengers: Infinity War (2018).)

=== Ronin and the Time Heist ===
In 2018, Barton, still on house arrest, enjoys a picnic with his family, but is caught off-guard when Laura, Lila, Cooper, and Nathaniel suddenly vanish. After learning what happened from Romanoff and Rogers, Barton, in his grief, becomes a vigilante called "Ronin". He dons a ninja costume and katana and begins to hunt down and eliminate organized crime around the world, killing criminals he believes deserved to die instead of innocents like his family. Barton goes to New York City and attacks the Tracksuit Mafia, murdering many of its members, including William Lopez, after getting a tip from Wilson Fisk's informant. (Note: As depicted in a flashback in the third episode of Hawkeye (2021).) Another time, he travels to Mexico and slaughters a drug cartel.

In 2023, Barton travels to Tokyo and murders the Yakuza, before being approached by Romanoff, who tells him that the Avengers discovered a way to reverse the Blip. Barton returns to the Compound and reunites with the other Avengers, as well as meeting Rocket Raccoon and Nebula. Barton volunteers to test out the quantum tunnel and is transported into the Quantum Realm where he time travels to an alternate 2018 timeline seeing his house and hearing his daughter's voice before being transported back. After the Avengers formulate a plan to retrieve the Infinity Stones from different points in time, Barton is given a shrunken Benatar by Rocket. He, Romanoff, Rhodes, and Nebula quantum travel to an alternate 2014 timeline. Barton and Romanoff leave Rhodes and Nebula on the planet Morag and travel in the Benatar through space to the planet Vormir. They are met by the Red Skull, who tells them that in order to retrieve the Soul Stone, a life sacrifice is required. Barton chooses to sacrifice himself, but is stopped by Romanoff. They fight to sacrifice themselves but, in the end, Romanoff jumps over the cliff, allowing Barton to obtain the Soul Stone. After returning to the main timeline, a grief-stricken Barton and the original Avengers hold a mourning for Romanoff outside of the Compound. Once the Nano Gauntlet is constructed, Barton watches as Banner uses it to reverse the Blip. To his amazement and surprise, Barton receives a phone call from his restored wife. However, the Compound is then attacked by missiles sent by an alternate Thanos' Sanctuary II warship and Barton falls into the Compound's tunnels below. Barton recovers the Gauntlet and protects it against the Outriders, before joining the battle against the alternate aliens. Barton watches Stark sacrifice himself to destroy Thanos' army and, after the battle, returns home in the Avengers' Quinjet and reunites with his family. A week later, they all attend Stark's funeral at his cabin and afterwards, Barton reunites with Maximoff.

=== Meeting Kate Bishop ===
In 2024, Barton, now wearing a hearing aid, spends time with his children in New York City for Christmas, attending a Broadway theatre musical, Rogers: The Musical. Barton leaves early due to being bothered by the inaccurate portrayal of the Battle of New York and reminders of Romanoff. That night at his hotel, he sees footage of a person wearing his Ronin suit while saving a dog on the news, which triggers memories of his Ronin past. He tracks down and rescues the disguised person from the Tracksuit Mafia. Afterwards, he unmasks the person and meets a young woman named Kate Bishop, a skilled archer who grew up idolizing him after he unknowingly saved her during the Battle of New York.

Barton goes with Bishop back to her apartment and meets Lucky, a Golden Retriever that Bishop had rescued and adopted earlier. They are soon attacked by the Mafia and forced to leave the Ronin suit behind as they evacuate. They relocate to Bishop's aunt's apartment and Barton returns to Bishop's apartment, which is now being tended to by the Fire Department, to find the suit but see it is gone. Barton sends his children back home the next morning, promising to return by Christmas Day. He escorts Bishop to her work in Times Square and then recovers the Ronin suit from Grills, a LARPer, at a LARP event in Central Park. Later, Barton allows himself to be captured by the Mafia to learn more about their plans. Bishop, unaware of this, tracks down Barton's location to rescue him and gets captured in the process.

Maya Lopez interrogates him on Ronin's true identity and Barton tells her that Ronin was killed by Romanoff. After managing to free himself and Bishop, the two flee in a car and evade Lopez and the Mafia at the Manhattan Bridge. They then leave on the subway.

==== Investigating the Tracksuit Mafia ====
Barton, accompanied by Bishop and Lucky, obtains a new hearing aid, gets breakfast, and then goes to the penthouse of Bishop's mother, Eleanor, to learn more about the Mafia's plan using her mother's company's database. However, Bishop gets locked out of her mother's account, and Barton is confronted by Jack Duquesne, the fiancé of Bishop's mother who possesses Barton's Ronin sword.

The situation is diffused after Eleanor and Duquesne recognize him as an Avenger. Eleanor asks him to keep Bishop out of his investigation as he secretly takes back his sword and leaves while Bishop and Lucky stay behind. With the help of Laura, Barton discovers that Duquesne is the CEO of Sloan Limited, a shell company that launders money for the Mafia. That night, Barton is met by Bishop and Lucky who return to the apartment and throw him a small Christmas party to make up for missing time with his family. They bond over various activities. Barton tells Bishop about his past with Romanoff and she deduces that he lost his family in the Blip and is the Ronin.

The next day, Barton sends Bishop and Lucky on a task to retrieve his arrows while he locates Lopez's lieutenant, Kazi Kazimierczak, and demands he convince Lopez to end her vendetta against Ronin. Afterwards, Laura informs Barton that a Rolex watch recovered from the Avengers Compound stolen by the Mafia is sending out tracking signals from an apartment building. Barton meets Bishop at Grills' apartment, who gives him the arrows back, and they leave to retrieve the watch. Barton hides out on the roof of a building adjacent to the apartment, while Bishop goes inside to find the watch and learns it is Lopez's apartment. Bishop tells Barton that Lopez is keeping notes on Barton and his family. Barton is then ambushed by a masked assassin who is revealed to be Yelena Belova, who is targeting him after being hired to do so, (Note: As depicted in the post-credit scene of Black Widow (2021).) before Bishop arrives and after a fight, Belova escapes. Barton decides that he cannot keep putting Bishop in danger and breaks off their partnership.

==== Hunted by Lopez and Belova ====
Barton takes shelter at Grills' apartment and falls asleep on the couch with Lucky. The next day, he visits the local Avengers memorial and speaks to the late Romanoff, apologizing aloud for what he is about to do. Barton sets up a meeting with Lopez where he dons the Ronin suit, quickly incapacitates the Mafia, and fights and defeats Lopez. He spares her life and unmasks, warning her that continued threats toward his family will result in her demise, and reveals that he was tipped off by an informant working for Lopez's boss who wanted her father dead. Lopez manages to injure Barton who is subsequently saved by Bishop and Lopez flees. Bishop reveals to Barton that Belova is hunting him and the two return to Grills' apartment. Barton is shown a text message sent from Belova to Bishop revealing that Eleanor is working with Lopez's boss, whom Barton identifies as Kingpin.

Barton watches a video Belova sent Bishop and learns that Eleanor killed Armand and set up Duquesne to take the fall. On Christmas Eve, Barton and Bishop attend Eleanor's holiday party at Rockefeller Center. Kazi attempts to assassinate Eleanor on Fisk's order, but later targets Barton. Barton enlists the help of Grills and the LARPers to evacuate the party guests, then later rejoins Bishop and defeats the Mafia. Bishop later departs to look for Eleanor, while Barton is confronted by Belova, who demands the truth of Romanoff's death. Barton complies but the struggle leads to a fight in which Barton eventually convinces Belova to stand down and spare his life after whistling her and Romanoff's whistle, leading her to realize how close he was to Romanoff. Belova comes to terms with Barton and leaves, while Barton meets with Bishop and expresses how proud he is of her, telling her only a few people have survived a fight with Kingpin. On Christmas Day, Barton departs New York in a car with Bishop and Lucky and returns to Iowa. Once home, he introduces Bishop and Lucky to his family, witnesses his children opening their presents, returns the stolen watch, a S.H.I.E.L.D. memento, to his wife Laura, and later burns the Ronin suit with Bishop.

== Alternate versions ==
Other versions of Barton are depicted in the alternate realities of the MCU multiverse.

=== 2012 variant ===
In an alternate 2012, Barton, Romanoff, Rogers, Stark, Thor, and Banner fight off the Chitauri in New York City. They defeat Loki at Stark Tower and afterwards, he and Romanoff hand the scepter over to Brock Rumlow and other agents.

=== What If...? (2021–2024) ===
Several alternate versions of Barton appear in the animated series What If...?, with Renner reprising his role.

- In an alternate 2012, Barton and Fury encounter Captain Carter coming through a portal via the Tesseract. Later, he joins the Avengers, consisting of Carter, Romanoff, Thor, Stark, and Hope van Dyne and fights during the Battle of New York.
- In an alternate 2011, Barton is framed for killing Thor in New Mexico by Hank Pym, who forces him to accidentally shoot Thor. Pym then kills Barton in his holding cell.
- In an alternate 2018, Barton goes with the Avengers to San Francisco to deal with a quantum virus that transforms people into zombies, but is infected and ambushes the survivors at Grand Central Station along with a zombified Wilson, infecting Happy Hogan. Later, he and the other zombies are transported by Doctor Strange Supreme to another dimension as to create a distraction for Ultron, but are seemingly killed after Ultron uses the Infinity Stones to obliterate the planet.
  - In Marvel Zombies, the zombified Barton was first seen hunting Kate Bishop, Kamala Khan and Riri Williams, although they would escape. Barton would later be made a scion of Maximoff, the zombies' Queen, aiding her in the show's finale battle, in which he was killed.
- In an alternate 2015, Barton and Romanoff become the only survivors following a cataclysmic event instigated by Ultron. His right arm is replaced by a robotic one, and he and Romanoff travel to Moscow in search of an analog code that may be able to shut down Ultron's AI. Afterward, they head to the Hydra Siberian Facility and locate the final copy of Arnim Zola's mind, which they hope to upload onto Ultron's hive mind and eliminate him. This plan backfires as Ultron was not in their universe, prompting Barton to sacrifice himself to the pursuing Ultron sentries for Romanoff and Zola to escape.
- In an alternate 2014 on Christmas Eve, Barton and Banner are at an Avengers toy action store dealing with crowds as Barton takes the last Iron Man action figure for his wife. He and Banner later regroup with Stark, Rogers, and Romanoff to return to Avengers Tower where they attack the Freak before learning he is Hogan and that Justin Hammer had attacked the Tower. After Hammer is apprehended, the team prepares for the annual Christmas party.
- In an alternate universe, Barton, along with Rogers, Stark, Romanoff, and Thor fought in Hulkbuster Mega suit armors against the Apex and his gamma army but were all killed.
- In an alternate universe, Barton is an anthropomorphic dragon.

== Concept and creation ==
Barton, with the alter ego of Hawkeye, was first introduced in Marvel comic books as a reluctant villain, in Tales of Suspense #57 (September 1964). After two more appearances as a villain in Tales of Suspense #60 and #64 (December 1964 and April 1965), Hawkeye joined the ranks of the Avengers in Avengers #16 (May 1965). He then became a perennial member of the team.

In the mid-2000s, Kevin Feige realized that Marvel still owned the rights to the core members of the Avengers, which included Barton. Feige, a self-professed "fanboy", envisioned creating a shared universe just as creators Stan Lee and Jack Kirby had done with their comic books in the early 1960s. After initially offering the role of Barton to Jensen Ackles, who had auditioned for the part of Captain America, Marvel hired Jeremy Renner to portray the character on screen.

Much of Clint's background and characterization in the Marvel Cinematic Universe was inspired by his Ultimate Marvel incarnation, particularly him being a S.H.I.E.L.D. agent and secretly having a wife and three children. His origin story in Earth-616 of him being a circus performer and former criminal trained by Swordsman is not included, though several elements of this version are implemented such as him becoming Ronin and eventually requiring hearing aids. His story and characterization in the Hawkeye television series were primarily influenced by Matt Fraction's 2012 comic run with the character.

== Characterization ==
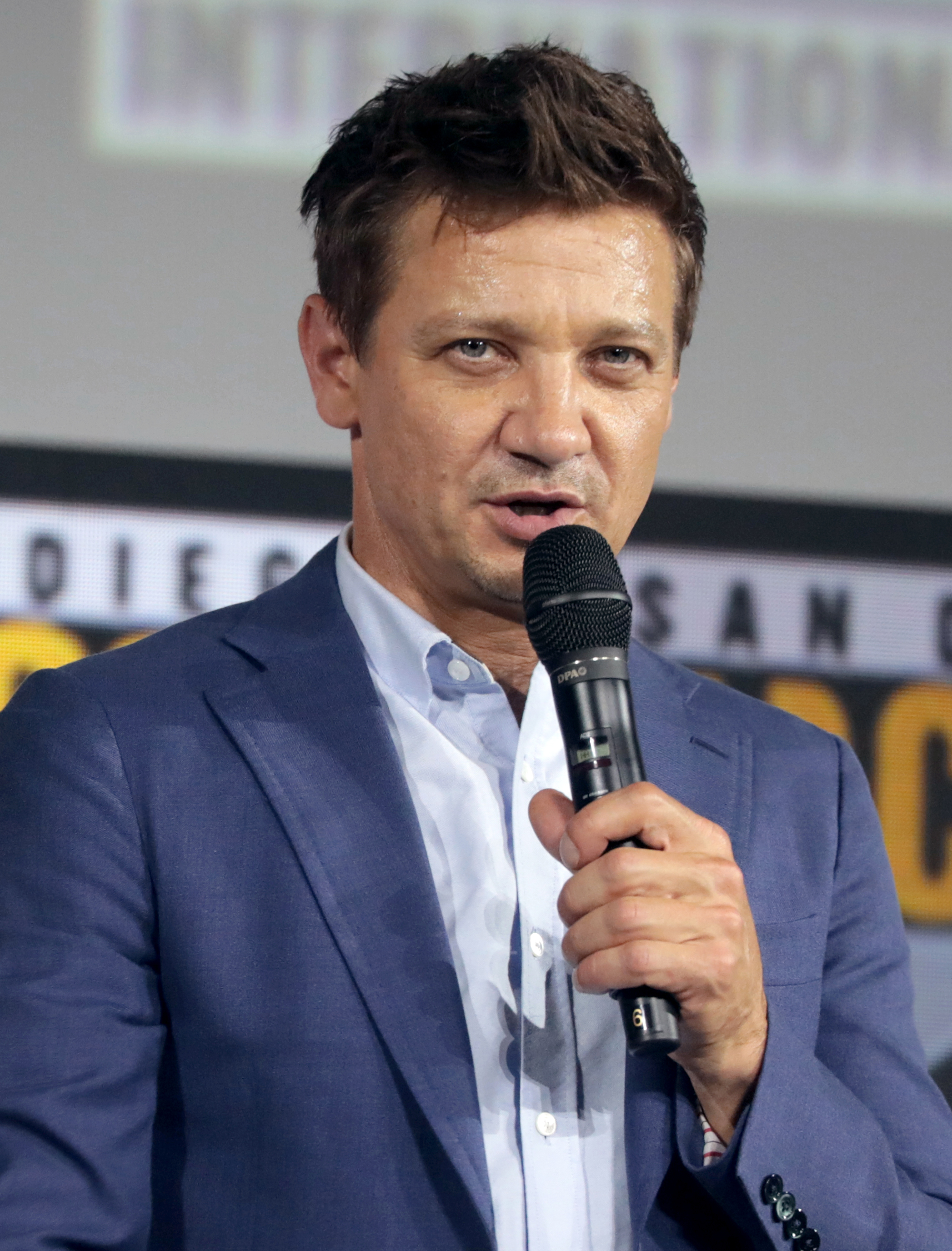
Jeremy Renner on the Hawkeye panel at San Diego Comic-Con in 2019.

A master archer working as an agent for S.H.I.E.L.D. Renner said it was a very physical role and that he trained physically and practiced archery as much as possible in preparation. About the role, Renner said, "When I saw Iron Man, I thought that was a really kick-ass approach to superheroes. Then they told me about this Hawkeye character, and I liked how he wasn't really a superhero; he's just a guy with a high skill set. I could connect to that". Regarding Hawkeye's sniper mentality, Renner said, "It's a lonely game. He's an outcast. His only connection is to Scarlett's character, Natasha. It's like a left hand/right hand thing. They coexist, and you need them both, especially when it comes to a physical mission". Renner said Hawkeye is not insecure about his humanity. "Quite the opposite, he's the only one who can really take down the Hulk with his [tranquilizer-tipped] arrows. He knows his limitations. But when it comes down to it, there has to be a sense of confidence in any superhero". Renner earned $2–3 million for his role in The Avengers.

Renner almost appeared in 2014's Captain America: The Winter Soldier in an extended cameo apprehending Steve Rogers, but was cut from the film by the directors due to his schedule conflicts.

Whedon said that Hawkeye interacts more with the other characters in Age of Ultron, as opposed to the first Avengers film where the character had been "possessed pretty early by a bad guy and had to walk around all scowly". As the character did not appear in any other of Marvel's Phase Two films, Whedon stated Age of Ultron sheds light on to what the character was doing since the end of The Avengers. Renner described the character as "kind of a loner" and "a team player only 'cause he sort of has to be. He's not really a company man. Captain America can be that guy. In [Age of Ultron] you'll understand why [Hawkeye] thinks the way he thinks".

In March 2015, Renner was revealed to be reprising his role as Barton in Captain America: Civil War. On Barton's reasons for joining Rogers' side, Renner said, "Cap was the first guy who called. Let's just get the job done so I can get home to the family", along with feeling an obligation to side with Scarlet Witch, since her brother, Pietro Maximoff, sacrificed himself to save Barton in Avengers: Age of Ultron. On how he and Barton fit into the Marvel Cinematic Universe, Renner said, "I'm happy to be the ensemble. I'm not scratching or clawing to do a solo movie by any means ... I think [Barton's] a utility guy that can bounce around into other people's universes a little bit".

Stephen McFeely described Barton's dark turn in Avengers: Endgame as "a good example of people who had much stronger stories after the Snap". The film's cold open, which features the disintegration of Barton's family, was initially supposed to be in Infinity War following Thanos' snap, however it was moved to Endgame instead, with Markus explaining that it was "going to blunt the brutality of what [Thanos] did." Joe Russo felt it was "a very tragic scene to open the movie with. It's one of the few scenes in the movie that actually makes me tear up when I watch it, because I think about my own family... And then you think about what would happen to you, as a father. You'd become very self-destructive". Renner makes an uncredited voice-only cameo appearance as Barton in Black Widow (2021).

In April 2019, a limited series focused on Barton's character was reported to be in development, with the plot involving Barton passing the mantle of Hawkeye to Kate Bishop. The series was officially announced at the 2019 San Diego Comic-Con, with the plot taking place following the events of Avengers: Endgame. Hawkeye premiered in November 2021, with Jonathan Igla serving as the series' showrunner. In September 2019, Hailee Steinfeld was announced to be portraying Kate Bishop. The series further explores the character's time as Ronin. Renner said that meeting Kate Bishop brings "an onslaught of problems" into Barton's life, as Barton does not understand her obsession with him.

== Reception ==
Polly Conway of Common Sense Media found Barton to be a positive role model across Hawkeye, writing, "Hard work, perseverance, and courage are all clear themes. You are not defined solely by your past choices and mistakes. [...] Although they have to make many sacrifices to do so, the heroes are fighting for the greater good. They demonstrate courage, teamwork, and perseverance." Michael Walsh of Collider included Barton in their "10 Best Non-Powered Characters In The MCU" list, saying, "Clint is easily the most grounded of The Avengers, operating without superpowers and with a loving family waiting for him to return home at the end of each mission." Chris E. Hayne of GameSpot ranked Barton 18th in their "38 Marvel Cinematic Universe Superheroes" list, writing, "While he's one of the original Avengers, he's also the least spectacular member of the team. That said, the standalone Hawkeye series on Disney+ did a lot of rehab of the character and, dare we say, we're going to miss Clint if he is indeed retired." Bradley Prom of Screen Rant ranked Barton 6th in their "10 Best Spies & Covert Agents" list, claiming that "his proficiency with the bow and arrow is what set him apart, and made him so deadly."

Samy Amanatullah of Screen Rant described Renner's portrayal of Barton as one of the casting decisions that helped the MCU, stating that "Renner channels the right amount of cynicism and earnestness to simultaneously shut down fan criticisms, recognize the ridiculousness of the premise, and somehow make it relatable." Kaitlin Thomas of TVLine found Renner's portrayal of Barton across Hawkeye funny and entertaining, stating, "Renner's performance in Hawkeye, whether he's playing the role of tired dad, nailing unexpected punchlines with pin-point accuracy, or making viewers laugh as an exasperated man attending a LARPing event in New York City, elevates the series beyond the basic thesis of a man torn between his family and doing the right thing." Jonny Hoffman of MovieWeb ranked Renner's performance in Hawkeye 7th in their "Jeremy Renner's Best Performances" list, writing, "In the Hawkeye series, Renner proves that he has what it takes to lead a superhero series through his performance and physicality. [...] Renner dives into a range of emotion throughout the series and proves that he is one of the greatest action stars working."

=== Accolades ===
Year	Recipient	Award	Category	Result	Ref
2013	The Avengers	People's Choice Awards	Favorite On-Screen Chemistry (with Scarlett Johansson)	Nominated	
2013	The Avengers	MTV Movie Awards	Best Fight (with cast)	Won	
2016	Captain America: Civil War	Teen Choice Awards	Choice Movie: Chemistry (with cast)	Nominated	
2017	Captain America: Civil War	Kids' Choice Awards	#Squad (with cast)	Nominated	
2019	Avengers: Endgame	Saturn Awards	Best Supporting Actor	Nominated	
2022	Hawkeye	Kids' Choice Awards	Favorite Male TV Star (Family)	Nominated	

=== Impact ===
The character has been the subject of various jokes including internet memes and a 2012 Saturday Night Live skit (in which Renner portrayed the character), highlighting the perceived absurdity of a regular human archer being amongst aliens, super soldiers, and gods. He was also perceived as being regularly "sidelined" during his appearances. During Avengers: Age of Ultron (2015), Barton himself acknowledged this when he stated, "The city is flying and we're fighting an army of robots. And I have a bow and arrow. None of this makes any sense". Renner indicated that he appreciates that Barton's character is more relatable, stating, "When I get off work, all I wanna do is be with my family. And having zero superpowers — I love that this guy has will and mental fortitude that anyone can have". Barton has been described as going from "the butt of all jokes" to a fan favorite and underdog.

After being excluded from marketing of Avengers: Infinity War (2018), fans of both Renner and the character—as well as those who ridiculed his "sidelined" appearances—drew attention to his absence. This was acknowledged by Renner on Instagram. A change.org petition demanding his inclusion in promotional material received over a thousand signatures. In an interview with Gizmodo's io9, producer Kevin Feige said that, as it drew attention to the character, he believed that the prevalent discussion "was one of the best things that ever happened to Hawkeye." The character did not appear in Infinity War, but was among the main cast in its sequel, Avengers: Endgame (2019).

In 2019, a satirical Reddit post went viral, comparing the ratio of the Avengers' wins in battles with Barton then without him—where they lost in all such cases.

== See also ==
- Characters of the Marvel Cinematic Universe
