= Eric Steelberg =

American cinematographer (born 1977)

- Born: April 1, 1977 (age 49); Northridge, Los Angeles, California, U.S.
- Years active: 1994–present

Eric Wesley Steelberg (born April 1, 1977) is an American cinematographer, known for his collaboration with director Jason Reitman.

== Early life ==
Steelberg was born in 1977 in the Northridge suburb of Los Angeles. His father was a lawyer while his mother was a homemaker.

He was interested in film and photography from a young age; in high school, he took photography classes and started a filmmaking club. Haskell Wexler once visited the club to discuss cinematography, which Steelberg described as "a religious experience for me and instrumental in becoming the resident camera geek".

After high school, he studied still photography at Santa Monica College and planned to transfer to the UCLA School of Theater, Film and Television, but he left Santa Monica after two years without graduating.

== Career ==
Steelberg shot the short film The Quiz at the age of 15, directed by one of his friends, Carl Rinsch, a student taking a summer production workshop at the University of Southern California.

In 1999, he shot the short film H@ for writer–director Jason Reitman, whom Steelberg had known since high school. He went on to work with Reitman on commercials before moving on to films.

Steelberg is a member of the American Society of Cinematographers (ASC) and the Academy of Motion Picture Arts and Sciences (AMPAS).

== Filmography ==
=== Feature film ===
Year	Title	Director	Notes
2006	Quinceañera	Richard Glatzer; Wash Westmoreland	
2007	Numb	Harris Goldberg	
2007	Juno	Jason Reitman	
2009	500 Days of Summer	Marc Webb	
2009	Bandslam	Todd Graff	
2009	Up in the Air	Jason Reitman	
2010	Going the Distance	Nanette Burstein	
2011	Young Adult	Jason Reitman	
2013	Labor Day	Jason Reitman	
2014	Draft Day	Ivan Reitman	
2014	Men, Women & Children	Jason Reitman	
2017	Baywatch	Seth Gordon	
2018	Tully	Jason Reitman	
2018	The Front Runner	Jason Reitman	
2019	Dolemite Is My Name	Craig Brewer	
2021	Ghostbusters: Afterlife	Jason Reitman	
2024	Ghostbusters: Frozen Empire	Gil Kenan	
2024	Saturday Night	Jason Reitman	
2027	The Comeback King	Judd Apatow	
2027	Narcs	John Phillips	

=== Television ===
Year	Title	Director	Notes
2010	Lone Star	Marc Webb	Episode "Pilot"
2010	Eastbound & Down	Jody Hill; David Gordon Green	Season 2
2015	Wicked City	Tom Shankland	Episode "Pilot"
2016	Billions	Neil Burger	Episode "Pilot"
2017	Crashing	Judd Apatow	Episode "Artie Lange"
2017	The Good Doctor	Seth Gordon	Episode "Burnt Food"
2019	The Fix	Larysa Kondracki	Episode "Pilot"
2021	Hawkeye	Rhys Thomas	3 episodes
2023	Ahsoka	Dave Filoni	5 episodes
