= Hawkeye (miniseries) =

2021 Marvel Studios television miniseries

- Genre: Action-adventure; Buddy comedy; Crime; Superhero
- Created by: Jonathan Igla
- Based on: Marvel Comics
- Starring: Jeremy Renner; Hailee Steinfeld; Tony Dalton; Fra Fee; Brian d'Arcy James; Aleks Paunovic; Piotr Adamczyk; Linda Cardellini; Simon Callow; Vera Farmiga; Alaqua Cox; Zahn McClarnon; Florence Pugh; Vincent D'Onofrio
- Composers: Christophe Beck; Michael Paraskevas
- Country of origin: United States
- Original language: English
- No. of seasons: 1
- No. of episodes: 6

Production
- Executive producers: Jonathan Igla; Rhys Thomas; Brad Winderbaum; Trinh Tran; Victoria Alonso; Louis D'Esposito; Kevin Feige
- Production locations: New York City; Atlanta, Georgia
- Cinematography: Eric Steelberg; James Whitaker
- Editors: Terel Gibson; Rosanne Tan; Tim Roche
- Running time: 40–62 minutes
- Production company: Marvel Studios
- Budget: $150 million

Original release
- Network: Disney+
- Release: November 24 – December 22, 2021

Related
- Echo; Marvel Cinematic Universe television series

Hawkeye is an American television miniseries created by Jonathan Igla for the streaming service Disney+, based on Marvel Comics featuring the characters Clint Barton / Hawkeye and Kate Bishop / Hawkeye. It is the fifth television series in the Marvel Cinematic Universe (MCU) produced by Marvel Studios, sharing continuity with the films of the franchise and taking place after the events of the film Avengers: Endgame (2019). It sees Clint Barton as he partners with Kate Bishop to confront enemies from his past to be with his family in time for Christmas. Igla served as head writer with Rhys Thomas leading the directing team.

Jeremy Renner reprises his role as Clint Barton from the film series, with Hailee Steinfeld joining him as Kate Bishop. Tony Dalton, Fra Fee, Brian d'Arcy James, Aleks Paunovic, Piotr Adamczyk, Linda Cardellini, Simon Callow, Vera Farmiga, Alaqua Cox, Zahn McClarnon, Florence Pugh, and Vincent D'Onofrio also star. Marvel Studios was developing a limited series for Disney+ centered on Hawkeye by April 2019, with Renner returning. The series was officially announced that July and Igla joined in September, with Steinfeld unofficially attached at that point. Thomas and Bert & Bertie joined as directors in July 2020 and filming began in New York City that December. Steinfeld and additional cast members were confirmed, and filming concluded in late April 2021. Additional shooting took place in Atlanta, Georgia. Matt Fraction and David Aja's Hawkeye comic run served as a major influence on the series.

Hawkeye premiered with its first two episodes on November 24, 2021, and ran for six episodes, concluding on December 22. It is part of Phase Four of the MCU. The series received positive reviews, with critics highlighting the action sequences and the chemistry between Renner and Steinfeld. A spin-off series, Echo, focusing on Cox's character Maya Lopez / Echo, was released on January 9, 2024, as part of Phase Five.

== Premise ==
A year after the events of Avengers: Endgame (2019), Clint Barton must partner with Kate Bishop to confront enemies from his past as the Ronin to get back to his family in time for Christmas.

== Cast and characters ==
- Jeremy Renner as Clint Barton / Hawkeye:
  A master archer and a former Avenger and agent of S.H.I.E.L.D. The series further explores the character's time as Ronin, as first shown in the film Avengers: Endgame (2019). Renner said that meeting Kate Bishop brings "an onslaught of problems" into Barton's life, as Barton does not understand her obsession with him. Director Rhys Thomas felt Barton had a compelling "strength of character" that exists "hidden underneath an imperfect and complex surface".
- Hailee Steinfeld as Kate Bishop:
  A 22-year-old Hawkeye fan who becomes Barton's protégée and is trained to take over the mantle of Hawkeye. Bishop idolizes Barton because she realizes she could train to be like him one day. She draws the attention of Barton by masquerading as Ronin. Steinfeld described Bishop as "smart and witty" and a "badass", with physical abilities that are "through the roof", while Renner said she has "a wonderfully annoying and equally charming manner about her". Director Bert described Bishop as "full of rookie energy; she's feisty and strong-willed with a deep desire to prove herself" and "a refreshing confidence", as well as the "comedy foil" to Barton's straight man. Steinfeld learned archery because Bishop is "self-taught" and felt it was an important aspect of her character since she idolizes Barton. Clara Stack plays a young Kate Bishop.
- Tony Dalton as Jack Duquesne:
  Eleanor's new fiancé and Armand's nephew. The character does not serve as Barton's mentor in the series as he does in the comics. Dalton believed his reputation for portraying antagonists such as Lalo Salamanca from the series Better Call Saul (2015–2022) helped conceal the twist of his character's friendly nature.
- Fra Fee as Kazimierz "Kazi" Kazimierczak:
  A mercenary for the Tracksuit Mafia. Fee described Kazi as having a "deep sense of loyalty" towards the Mafia but also some frustration at not having a higher position in the gang. He learned American Sign Language for the role. Phoenix Crepin portrays a younger Kazi.
- Brian d'Arcy James as Derek Bishop: Kate's deceased father.
- Aleks Paunovic as Ivan Banionis: An enforcer for the Tracksuit Mafia.
- Piotr Adamczyk as Tomas Delgado: An enforcer for the Tracksuit Mafia.
- Linda Cardellini as Laura Barton: Clint's wife and a former agent of S.H.I.E.L.D.
- Simon Callow as Armand Duquesne III: Jack's uncle.
- Vera Farmiga as Eleanor Bishop: Kate's mother and the CEO of Bishop Security.
- Alaqua Cox as Maya Lopez: The deaf commander of the Tracksuit Mafia. Darnell Besaw, Cox's cousin, plays a young Maya Lopez.
- Zahn McClarnon as William Lopez: Maya's deceased father and a former commander of the Tracksuit Mafia.
- Florence Pugh as Yelena Belova:
  A highly trained spy and assassin who is hunting Barton for his supposed role in her adoptive sister Natasha Romanoff's death. Pugh said that Belova is continuing "what she's good at, and despite her sister not being there, she's back working", though her mission to hunt Barton "sets up a whole different challenge".
- Vincent D'Onofrio as Wilson Fisk / Kingpin:
  A crime lord in New York whom Eleanor has connections with. D'Onofrio reprises his role from the Marvel Television series Daredevil (2015–2018). On Kingpin's portrayal in the series, directors Bert & Bertie said they wanted to take into account the character's presence that was established in Daredevil. D'Onofrio considered the role a continuation of his portrayal in Daredevil, with a difference in physical strength but still operating "through the pain of his childhood". He played the character considering that Fisk had regained power after losing status during the Blip. He added that the portrayal was "done with an eye on connecting as many dots from Daredevil to Hawkeye as possible", but acknowledged that some aspects, such as his enhanced physical strength, could not connect back. After gaining 40 pounds (18 kg) for the role in Daredevil, D'Onofrio chose to wear a fat suit for the series. D'Onofrio thought the suit had progressed with modern technology to give him a more realistic look while also being lighter to wear, which allowed him to not have to gain the weight.

Recurring in the series are Carlos Navarro as Enrique, an enforcer for the Tracksuit Mafia; Ben Sakamoto, Ava Russo, and Cade Woodward reprising their respective roles as Barton's children Cooper, Lila, and Nathaniel from prior MCU films; Jolt, a Golden Retriever, playing Lucky the Pizza Dog, Kate's adopted dog; Clayton English, Adetinpo Thomas, Robert Walker-Branchaud, and Adelle Drahos respectively as Grills, Wendy Conrad, Orville, and Missy, all NYC LARPers who befriend and help Barton and Bishop; and Ivan Mbakop as NYPD Detective Caudle.

Also appearing are Jonathan Bergman as Armand VII, the grandson of Armand III, and Franco Castan as Detective Rivera, a member of the NYPD. The fictional Steve Rogers / Captain America musical within the series, Rogers: The Musical, sees stage actors portray Thor (Jason Scott McDonald), Loki (Jordan Chin), Rogers (Tom Feeney), Bruce Banner / Hulk (Harris Turner), Barton (Avery Gillham), Romanoff (Meghan Manning), Tony Stark / Iron Man (Aaron Nedrick), Scott Lang / Ant-Man (Nico DeJesus), and Chitauri warriors. Adam Pascal cameos as Lead Citizen in the musical. Newscaster Pat Kiernan appears as himself.

== Episodes ==
No.	Title	Directed by	Written by	Original release date
1	"Never Meet Your Heroes"	Rhys Thomas	Jonathan Igla	November 24, 2021
In 2012, during the Battle of New York, (Note: As depicted in The Avengers (2012)) a young Kate Bishop witnesses Clint Barton battling the Chitauri and aspires to become a hero like him after he inadvertently saves her life. In the present, Barton spends time with his children in New York for Christmas. Meanwhile, Kate attends a charity auction gala with her mother Eleanor and learns that her mother is engaged to Jack Duquesne. Underneath the gala, Kate stumbles onto a black market auction featuring items recovered from the remains of the Avengers Compound, (Note: As depicted in Avengers: Endgame (2019)) finding Duquesne and his uncle Armand III among the attendees. The auction is interrupted by the Tracksuit Mafia, who attempt to recover a watch among the items. As Duquesne steals Barton's Ronin sword, Kate recovers Barton's Ronin suit and defeats the mafia members while wearing it. After rescuing a stray dog she later names "Lucky the Pizza Dog", she escapes to her apartment before tracking down Armand to investigate further, but discovers that Armand has been murdered in his home and is cornered by the Tracksuit Mafia after fleeing the crime scene. Barton, who saw a news report of the Ronin's return, rescues Kate from the gangsters.
2	"Hide and Seek"	Rhys Thomas	Elisa Climent	November 24, 2021
Kate takes Barton back to her apartment, but they are attacked by the Tracksuit Mafia and forced to evacuate, leaving the Ronin suit behind. After relocating to the apartment of Kate's vacationing aunt, Barton sends his children back home, promising to rejoin them by Christmas Day. He escorts Kate to her workplace, then recovers the Ronin suit from FDNY member Grills at a LARP event. Later, Kate fails to convince Eleanor of Duquesne's involvement in Armand's death. After challenging Duquesne to a fencing duel, she tries to contact Barton, not knowing that he has allowed himself to be captured by the Tracksuit Mafia. She tracks down Barton's location, but ends up being captured herself, and the gang informs their boss, Maya Lopez, of what happened.
3	"Echoes"	Bert & Bertie	Katie Mathewson & Tanner Bean	December 1, 2021
Maya interrogates Barton and Bishop about Ronin, who killed her father William years prior. Barton manages to free himself and fend off the Tracksuit Mafia, though Maya breaks his hearing aid in the process. After Kate is freed, the pair escape using Barton's trick arrows and get his hearing aid fixed. While moving to another location, Maya's lieutenant Kazi advises her not to get into trouble with her "uncle". Intending to learn more about the Tracksuit Mafia as well as Duquesne, Kate convinces Barton to infiltrate Eleanor's penthouse and use her company account to access Bishop Security's criminal database. However, Kate is locked out of the system while attempting to bypass security while Barton encounters Duquesne, who threatens him with Ronin's sword.
4	"Partners, Am I Right?"	Bert & Bertie	Erin Cancino & Heather Quinn	December 8, 2021
Barton defuses the situation after Eleanor and Duquesne recognize him as an Avenger. Eleanor asks him to keep Kate out of his investigation and later contacts an unknown person to inform them of the situation. With the help of his wife Laura, Barton secretly recovers his sword and discovers that Duquesne is the CEO of Sloan Limited, a shell corporation that launders money for the Tracksuit Mafia, while Kate deduces that Barton was Ronin. Barton locates Kazi and asks him to talk Maya out of her vendetta against Ronin while Kate enlists a group of LARPers in retrieving Barton's trick arrows. Afterwards, Laura informs Barton that the watch the Tracksuit Mafia stole is sending out tracking signals from an apartment building. Barton and Kate go to retrieve it, but find it in Maya's apartment, where she also keeps notes on Barton and his family. Maya attacks Kate while Barton is ambushed by a masked assassin. A fight ensues between the four combatants, with Kate injuring Maya, forcing her to retreat, while Barton unmasks his assailant, Yelena Belova, who also escapes. Barton decides that he cannot keep putting Kate in danger and breaks off their partnership.
5	"Ronin"	Bert & Bertie	Jenna Noel Frazier	December 15, 2021
In 2018, Yelena and fellow Black Widow Sonya, who have been helping deprogrammed Black Widows, reunite with another former Widow, Ana, and Yelena becomes a victim of the Blip. In the present, Kate returns to Eleanor's house and tells her about Duquesne's shell corporation, leading Eleanor to call the NYPD and have him arrested. Kate returns to her apartment, where she finds Yelena waiting for her before the latter reveals her past and mission to kill Barton. (Note: As depicted in Black Widow (2021)) Meanwhile, after recovering at Grills' apartment, Barton dons the Ronin suit and confronts Maya at the auto shop where he killed her father. During the fight, he unmasks himself and attempts to convince her to let go of her vendetta and leave his family alone. He reveals that an informant working for Maya's boss wanted her father dead, but Maya initially disbelieves him. Kate arrives to help Barton escape, while Maya becomes suspicious of Kazi, who was absent on the night of her father's death. The next day, Yelena texts Kate, revealing that she was hired by Eleanor to kill Barton and that Eleanor is working with Maya's "uncle", Wilson Fisk, whom Barton identifies as Kingpin.
6	"So This Is Christmas?"	Rhys Thomas	Jonathan Igla & Elisa Climent	December 22, 2021
As Eleanor meets with Fisk to break off their partnership, Barton and Kate watch a recording of them and learn that Eleanor killed Armand and framed Duquesne. On Christmas Eve, Barton and Kate attend Eleanor's holiday party, where Kate confronts her mother and learns her father owed money to Fisk, leading to Eleanor working with him. Kazi attempts to assassinate Eleanor on Fisk's orders, but targets Barton instead. Barton enlists help from Grills, the LARPers, and Duquesne to evacuate the party before rejoining Kate to defeat the Tracksuit Mafia. After Maya kills Kazi, Kate attempts to look for Eleanor while Barton is confronted by Yelena, who demands the truth of Natasha Romanoff's death. They fight, but he reminds her of his friendship with Romanoff and her sacrifice to save the entire universe. Yelena spares him and leaves. Fisk tries to stop Eleanor from escaping, but Kate arrives and incapacitates him with Barton's trick arrows. Afterwards, Eleanor is arrested by the police for Armand's murder. Fisk escapes but is confronted by Maya as a gunshot is heard. The next day, Barton returns to his family with Kate and Lucky, returns the watch to Laura, and burns the Ronin suit.

== Production ==
=== Development ===
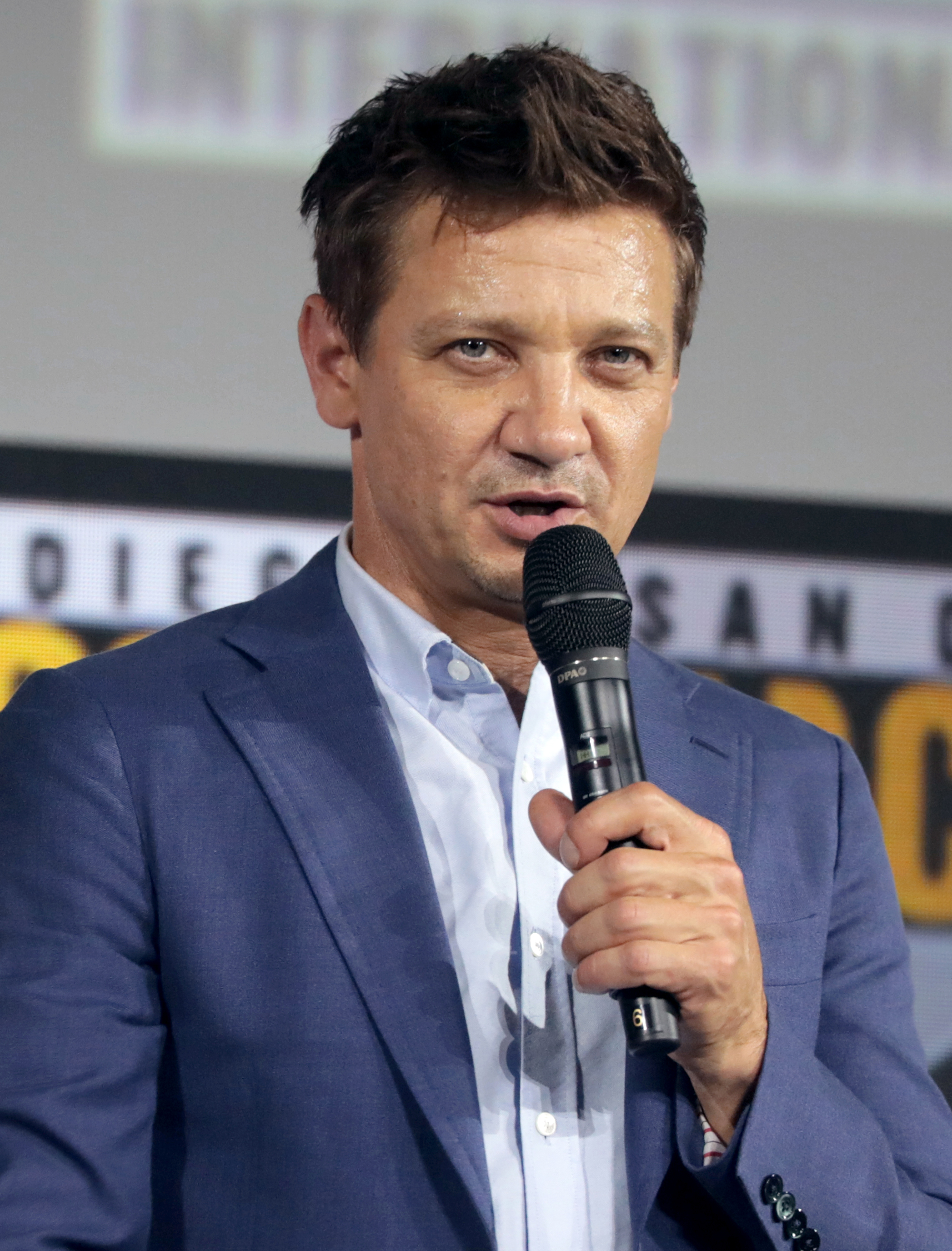
Star Jeremy Renner promoting the series at the 2019 San Diego Comic-Con

By September 2018, Marvel Studios was developing several limited series for its parent company Disney's streaming service, Disney+, to be centered on supporting characters from the Marvel Cinematic Universe (MCU) films who had not starred in their own films. By April 2019, an adventure series starring Jeremy Renner as his MCU film character Clint Barton / Hawkeye was in development. Barton was expected to bequeath the mantle of Hawkeye to a new character, Kate Bishop, in the series. Marvel Studios president Kevin Feige was set to produce the limited series, which would run for six to eight episodes. Feige officially announced Hawkeye at San Diego Comic-Con in July 2019. Renner originally signed on to star in a standalone feature film focused on his character, but agreed to star in a series instead after Feige decided to redevelop the project for Disney+; Marvel Studios believed a series allowed them to explore Barton's backstory, introduce Bishop, and develop the two characters' dynamic—which was popular with fans of Marvel Comics—all of which would have been restricted by a film's two-hour runtime.

Jonathan Igla was revealed to be the series' head writer in September 2019. Amy Berg had also been a contender for the role. In July 2020, Rhys Thomas was hired to direct three episodes of the series and serve as an executive producer, with filmmaking duo Bert & Bertie hired to direct the other three episodes. In late November 2020, executive producer Trinh Tran asked MCU film director Joe Russo for help in finding a new head writer for the series. He connected her to Andrew Guest, and Tran explained to Guest that Marvel Studios was looking to rewrite the entire series approximately a week out from the start of filming. After reviewing the six episodes that had already been written, Guest provided feedback on what was working and started writing "around the clock" to provide new material that could be used to shape the series during filming. Marvel Studios' Feige, Louis D'Esposito, Victoria Alonso, Tran, and Brad Winderbaum executive produced alongside Igla and Thomas. Guest was credited as a consulting producer. Budgets for each of the six episodes were reported to be as much as $25 million.

Around the series' release, commentators speculated that a potential second season could be made focusing on Bishop. Though the series was originally intended to be a limited series, Marvel Studios did not classify it as such during its awards campaign and home media release which led to further speculation about the possibility of a second season being made. When asked about another season, Thomas said he could not talk about future plans but he was open to returning. Renner was asked about a second season in May 2024, following rumors that one was in development with a reduced role for Barton. The actor said he was open to playing Barton again after recovering from a serious accident in 2023, but he had not discussed another season with Marvel and was focused on other projects. Guest later stated that he was involved in discussions about a potential second season at one point, but it did not come together due to timing issues. In February 2025, Winderbaum gave Hawkeye as an example of an MCU limited series that Marvel felt could be given a second season, and said they were "looking for opportunities to do that". He felt Barton, Bishop, and the series' Christmas setting could be revisited at any point. That May, Renner said he had been approached about a second season but he turned down Marvel Studios' offer for half his first-season salary. Renner believed the reduced offer was due to his accident and said he would have returned if he was offered his first season salary. He said in July, "I'm sure we'll end up doing [a second season of Hawkeye]" alongside other projects with him reprising the role, which he was happy to do and felt physically ready for.

=== Writing ===
Elisa Climent, Katie Mathewson, Tanner Bean, Erin Cancino, Heather Quinn, and Jenna Noel Frazier serve as writers on the series. Quinn served as the on-set writer during filming. When officially announcing the series, Feige and Renner said the series would follow Barton as he teaches Bishop to be a "superhero without superpowers", and would explore more of Barton's time as the vigilante Ronin that was first established in the MCU film Avengers: Endgame (2019). In October 2019, Tran said the series would explore Barton's past, and confirmed that the mantle of Hawkeye would be passed to Bishop. Igla hoped the series would show a more humorous side of the character while further exploring his mentorship role from previous appearances. Hawkeye is influenced by Matt Fraction's run with the character in the comics, and adapts elements such as Lucky the Pizza Dog, a Golden Retriever who is a companion to Barton and Bishop; the Tracksuit Mafia; and Barton's hearing loss. Igla declared himself a fan of that title, which he read while working on the television series Mad Men (2007–2015), for its approach in telling what a superhero does in his off days, as well as a "comforting and relaxing" nature he likened to the Christmas films from the Hallmark Channel. The influence was also seen in how Barton has a "lightheartedness" to him that was not seen in his past appearances, and the desire to highlight the "bond and partnership" between him and Bishop, despite Renner's version of the character being different from the comics version, including the banter the two have in Fraction's run. Feige was excited to explore the MCU version of Barton adapted into the tone from Fraction's run, and exploring "What would it be like if he was thrust into that street level, New York City realm?". Fraction served as a consultant for the series, and had planned to make a cameo appearance as a Tracksuit Mafia member before the COVID-19 pandemic prevented this.

Hawkeye is set in New York City around the Christmas season of 2024, one year following the events of Avengers: Endgame, with Tran noting that many, but not all, of New York's citizens have "recuperated and continued thriving" following the Blip. Renner described the series as being set in the "current" MCU, while occurring over the course of about a week. Thomas noted that it had been discussed during development to set the series two years after Endgame in 2025. Further discussing the holiday setting, Tran said it "made sense" to have Barton's story set during that time since he would be focused on spending Christmas with his family after losing them during the Blip, and the "holiday spirit" would provide a "different atmosphere and environment" that would contrast to Barton's serious demeanor. Feige championed the Christmas setting, requesting to lean further into the holiday since, according to Tran, he felt it was "about the festivity of the holiday season and spending time with family". Tran added that the Christmas setting became "kind of like a character in itself" for Hawkeye.

=== Casting ===
With the series' official announcement in July 2019, Renner was confirmed to be starring in the series as Clint Barton / Hawkeye. By early September 2019, Hailee Steinfeld had been offered the role of Kate Bishop, but had not yet signed on for the series a month later. Variety reported one reason for this was a non-compete clause in her contract with Apple TV+ for starring in the series Dickinson (2019–2021), something Variety felt Steinfeld would be able to negotiate out of. No other actresses had been approached for the role of Bishop. When asked about her starring in the series shortly after, Steinfeld said it was "not something that's necessarily happening", but she was confirmed as Bishop in December 2020. Tran explained that Steinfeld was never out of contention for the role but Marvel Studios was unable to discuss her involvement until the official announcement and had spent the time since the initial reports attempting to work out how the series could be made with Steinfeld while still being ready for release during the 2021 holiday season.

Additional cast members also announced in December 2020 were Vera Farmiga as Eleanor Bishop, Florence Pugh as Yelena Belova / Black Widow, Fra Fee as Kazimierz "Kazi" Kazimierczak, Tony Dalton as Jack Duquesne, Alaqua Cox as Maya Lopez / Echo, Zahn McClarnon as William Lopez, and Brian d'Arcy James as Derek Bishop. Pugh reprises her role from the MCU film Black Widow (2021), which has a post-credits scene in which Belova is tasked by Valentina Allegra de Fontaine to hunt Barton for his role in her sister Natasha Romanoff's death. Pugh's Belova was included in the series after Igla suggested it as the "right place for her next chapter", with the series' directors attending an early screening of Black Widow to better understand Belova. Devin Grayson and J. G. Jones, who co-created Belova, had expected to receive $2,000 per episode for her appearance in the series due to a 2007 agreement with Marvel Comics, but ultimately received $300 per episode due to a provision in the contract which allowed Marvel to reduce creators' payments. Dalton was cast after Tran was impressed with his performance as Lalo Salamanca in the series Better Call Saul (2015–2022). The same month, set photos revealed that Ben Sakamoto, Ava Russo, and Cade Woodward would reprise their respective roles in the series as Barton's children Cooper, Lila, and Nathaniel from previous MCU films. Linda Cardellini was revealed to be reprising her role as Barton's wife Laura in October 2021. Aleks Paunovic and Piotr Adamczyk also star in the series as Ivan and Tomas, respectively, members of the Tracksuit Mafia, along with Simon Callow as Armand Duquesne III, and Vincent D'Onofrio reprising his role as Wilson Fisk / Kingpin from the Marvel Television series Daredevil (2015–2018). Marvel Studios executives suggested including Kingpin in Hawkeye, with Feige thinking this would be appropriate due to the character's connections with the NYC underworld in the comics.

=== Design ===
External videos
- Marvel Studios' Hawkeye: End Credits Main on End Title Sequence Without Text presents the series' main title sequence with the text removed, YouTube video from Perception's channel

The series' main title sequence was designed by Perception. Marvel Studios requested that the first episode feature an opening title sequence to chronicle Bishop's story in the years between her appearances before and after the main titles, while the five other episodes featured main-on-end title sequences. Perception used monochromatic silhouettes to represent different characters and elements, and paid homage to David Aja's Hawkeye comic book illustrations.

=== Filming ===
Filming began in early December 2020 in New York City, with Rhys Thomas and Bert & Bertie directing, with Eric Steelberg and James Whitaker serving as cinematographers. The series was filmed under the working title Anchor Point. Filming took place in Downtown Brooklyn including at the Hoyt–Schermerhorn Streets subway station, and in Manhattan in Washington Square Park, Midtown, Hell's Kitchen, the East Village, and the Lotte New York Palace Hotel. Set photos also indicated the series would occur during the Christmas season and feature a Christmas party. Additional filming took place at Trilith Studios and Tyler Perry Studios in Atlanta, Georgia. On February 22, 2021, filming began in downtown Canton, Georgia for a week, including at the Jones Building, continuing in the area between March 4 and 5. Filming wrapped on April 21. Reshoots occurred at Stratagem Studios in Toronto, Canada, from September 7 to 9.

=== Post-production ===
Terel Gibson, Rosanne Tan, and Tim Roche serve as editors. Visual effects were created by Industrial Light & Magic, Luma Pictures, Mr. X, Rise, Rising Sun Pictures, and Weta Digital.

=== Music ===
Christophe Beck was revealed to be composing the score for the series in September 2021, after previously doing so for the MCU films Ant-Man (2015) and Ant-Man and the Wasp (2018), as well as the Marvel Studios miniseries WandaVision (2021). He was joined by frequent collaborator Michael Paraskevas as co-composer. The score was recorded at Synchron Stage Vienna.

The episodes "Never Meet Your Heroes" and "So This Is Christmas?" feature a musical number from the fictional Broadway musical Rogers: The Musical titled "Save the City", centered on the Battle of New York and written by Marc Shaiman and Scott Wittman. It was released as a single on November 24, and is included on the Vol. 2 soundtrack for the series. The score for the first three episodes was released on December 10, while the score for the last three episodes was released on December 22.

Hawkeye: Vol. 1 (Episodes 1–3) [Original Soundtrack]
No.	Title	Length
1.	"Hawkeye's Theme"	1:48
2.	"Clock Tower Mishap"	1:56
3.	"Battle of New York"	3:49
4.	"Carol of the Buy & Sells"	3:17
5.	"Ronin"	1:52
6.	"Sincerity"	1:28
7.	"Action at the Auction"	3:59
8.	"2012"	2:50
9.	"In Like Clint"	2:06
10.	"Molotov Mazeltov"	2:01
11.	"Discovery"	2:59
12.	"Bows of Holly"	0:52
13.	"LARP in the Park"	2:32
14.	"Mistletoe to Toe"	2:42
15.	"It's Beginning to Look a Lot Like Clint's Mess"	2:47
16.	"Maya's Theme"	4:10
17.	"Sorry Santa"	3:36
18.	"Do You Hear What I Fear?"	2:13
19.	"Little Dragon"	1:46
20.	"Fighting Over Toys"	3:20
Total length:		47:23

All music is composed by Christophe Beck & Michael Paraskevas, except where noted.

Hawkeye: Vol. 2 (Episodes 4–6) [Original Soundtrack]
No.	Title	Writer(s)	Length
1.	"Dustup on a Housetop"		4:22
2.	"No Words"		3:57
3.	"Barton Funk"		2:08
4.	"Arrival and Return"		3:00
5.	"Tiny Bow"		2:55
6.	"Yuletide Fray"		4:45
7.	"Bone & Marrow"		1:22
8.	"A Christmas Peril"		4:07
9.	"Wreck the Halls"		4:08
10.	"Star of Wonder"		1:50
11.	"Ruckus Around the Christmas Tree"		1:57
12.	"Give 'Em Hell"		3:02
13.	"I'm Sorry"		2:02
14.	"Archer Enemies"		2:27
15.	"Natasha"		3:21
16.	"Lady Hawk"		1:43
17.	"Quiver Bells"		1:55
18.	"Save the City" (featuring Adam Pascal, Ty Taylor, Rory Donovan, Derek Klena, Bonnie Milligan, Christopher Sieber and Shayna Steele)	Marc Shaiman and Scott Wittman	4:26
Total length:			53:05

== Marketing ==
Concept art for the series featuring designs of the characters' costumes was included in Expanding the Universe, a Marvel Studios special that debuted on Disney+ on November 12, 2019. A trailer was released on September 13, 2021. Jeremy Mathai at /Film said everything in the teaser looked "shockingly delightful—from the laid-back, comedic tone" to the chemistry between Steinfeld and Renner. He was enthused about the low-stakes of the series' story with Barton trying to get home for Christmas. Chaim Gartenberg of The Verge was drawn to the teaser's "surprisingly light tone" and felt the series would draw elements from the Christmas films Home Alone (1990) and Die Hard (1988). NME's Sam Warner described the teaser as a "festive first look" at the series, and noted the use of the song "It's the Most Wonderful Time of the Year". Stephen Iervolino of Good Morning America said the teaser was a blend of "action, humor and downright 007-looking spy scenes". Ryan Parker, writing for The Hollywood Reporter, noted the unique tone of the teaser that presented the series as "more of a comedy, holiday romp, albeit with a ton of action". Entertainment Weekly's Christian Holub felt the Christmas setting added a "Home Alone-like vibe" to the series and noted the teaser's many references to the comics, particularly Fraction's run. The series official poster was released at the end of October, with John Lutz of Collider noting the further inspiration of Fraction's run in the costumes worn by Barton and Bishop on the poster and the colors used, as well as the series' logo.

An episode of the series Marvel Studios: Legends was released on November 12, 2021, for Disney+'s "Disney+ Day" celebration, exploring Barton using footage of his MCU film appearances. Additionally, an extended scene was released on Disney+ Day. In January 2021, Marvel announced their "Marvel Must Haves" program, which reveals new toys, games, books, apparel, home decor, and other merchandise related to each episode of Hawkeye following an episode's release. The first "Must Haves" merchandise for the episodes started on November 26, 2021.

== Release ==
Hawkeye debuted its first two episodes on Disney+ on November 24, 2021. The remaining four episodes were released weekly, concluding on December 22. It is part of Phase Four of the MCU. A premiere screening was held in London on November 11, 2021, as well as on November 17 at the El Capitan Theatre in Los Angeles.

=== Home media ===
Hawkeye was released on Ultra HD Blu-ray on December 3, 2024, with SteelBook packaging and concept art cards. Bonus features include the featurette "A Tale of Two Hawkeyes"; deleted scenes; a gag reel; and the Marvel Studios: Assembled documentary special "The Making of Hawkeye".

== Reception ==
=== Viewership ===
Luminate, which measures streaming performance in the U.S. by analyzing viewership data, audience engagement metrics, and content reach across various platforms, reported that Hawkeye accounted for 4.9% of total original series viewership on Disney+ between December 31, 2021, and December 29, 2022. According to the file-sharing news website TorrentFreak, Hawkeye was the fifth most-watched pirated television series of 2021.

=== Critical response ===
Hawkeye: Critical reception by episode
Percentage of positive critics' reviews tracked by the website Rotten Tomatoes

The review aggregator website Rotten Tomatoes reports a 92% approval rating with an average rating of 7.55/10, based on 174 reviews. The site's critical consensus reads, "Hawkeye starts slowly, but the street-level action is a refreshing change of pace for the MCU—and the chemistry between its leads sparkles even when the plot lags." Metacritic, which uses a weighted average, assigned a score of 66 out of 100 based on 27 critics, indicating "generally favorable reviews".

Andrew Webster of The Verge felt that Hawkeye was "a few different things", adding: "It's a chance to spend more time with one of the lesser-known Avengers, it's an origin story for an up-and-coming hero, and it's a detective drama set amidst the backdrop of Christmas in New York City as the MCU adds yet another genre to its all-enveloping fold." He considered it alongside WandaVision and Loki as the best of the MCU on Disney+. Writing for Empire, Laura Sirikul gave the series four out of five stars and described it as "charming and full of heart". Richard Trenholm of CNET gave the series a positive review while noting that "Overall, Hawkeye isn't a tortured antihero searching for redemption, he's still just affable Jeremy Renner trundling around looking grumpy. And the show mostly knows this, sticking him into action scenes that are more playful than perilous. Episode 2 in particular has both Clint and Kate engaged in mock combat that's fun to watch rather than hazardous to their health, a jaunty twist on the gritty action-scene-every-episode formula."

Polly Conway of Common Sense Media rated the miniseries 4 out of 5 stars and praised the depiction of positive messages and role models, writing, "Hard work, perseverance, and courage are all clear themes. You are not defined solely by your past choices and mistakes. [...] Although they have to make many sacrifices to do so, the heroes are fighting for the greater good. They demonstrate courage, teamwork, and perseverance." Ben Travers of IndieWire gave the series a "C−", feeling that it was "more concerned with setting up Kate Bishop for future MCU phases than creating a problem worthy of two heroes' time".

=== Accolades ===
The series was given the Seal of Authentic Representation from the Ruderman Family Foundation for Cox's role as Maya Lopez. The seal is given to films and series that feature actors with disabilities who have at least five lines of dialogue. The series was also one of 200 television series that received the ReFrame Stamp for the years 2021 to 2022. The stamp is awarded by the gender equity coalition ReFrame and industry database IMDbPro for film and television projects that are proven to have gender-balanced hiring, with stamps being awarded to projects that hire female-identifying people, especially women of color, in four out of eight key roles for their production.

Accolades received by Hawkeye
Award	Date(s) of ceremony	Category	Recipient(s)	Result	Ref.
Visual Effects Society Awards	March 8, 2022	Outstanding Created Environment in an Episode, Commercial, or Real-Time Project	Nicholas Hodgson, David Abbott, Nick Cattel, Jin Choi (for "Echoes")	Nominated	
Visual Effects Society Awards	March 8, 2022	Outstanding Created Environment in an Episode, Commercial, or Real-Time Project	John O'Connell, Tiffany Yung, Orion Terry, Ho Kyung Ahn (for "So This Is Christmas?")	Nominated	
Critics Choice Super Awards	March 17, 2022	Best Superhero Series	Hawkeye	Nominated	
Critics Choice Super Awards	March 17, 2022	Best Actress in a Superhero Series	Hailee Steinfeld	Nominated	
Critics Choice Super Awards	March 17, 2022	Best Villain in a Series	Vincent D'Onofrio	Nominated	
Cinema Audio Society Awards	March 19, 2022	Outstanding Achievement in Sound Mixing for Television Movie or Limited Series	Pud Cusack, Tom Myers, Danielle Dupre, Casey Stone, Doc Kane, and Kevin Schultz	Nominated	
Nickelodeon Kids' Choice Awards	April 9, 2022	Favorite Male TV Star (Family)	Jeremy Renner	Nominated	
Nickelodeon Kids' Choice Awards	April 9, 2022	Favorite Female TV Star (Family)	Hailee Steinfeld	Nominated	
Hollywood Critics Association TV Awards	August 14, 2022	Best Actress in a Streaming Series, Comedy	Hailee Steinfeld	Nominated	
Hollywood Critics Association TV Awards	August 14, 2022	Best Supporting Actress in a Streaming Series, Comedy	Florence Pugh	Nominated	
Primetime Creative Arts Emmy Awards	September 3–4, 2022	Outstanding Stunt Coordination for a Comedy Series or Variety Program	Heidi Moneymaker and Noon Orsatti	Nominated	
Primetime Creative Arts Emmy Awards	September 3–4, 2022	Outstanding Stunt Performance	Carl Richard Burden, Noon Orsatti, Renae Moneymaker, and Crystal Hooks (for "Echoes")	Nominated	
Saturn Awards	October 25, 2022	Best Limited Event Series (Streaming)	Hawkeye	Nominated	
Saturn Awards	October 25, 2022	Best Performance by a Younger Actor (Streaming)	Hailee Steinfeld	Nominated	
Saturn Awards	October 25, 2022	Best Guest Performance in a Streaming Series	Tony Dalton	Nominated	

==== Emmy Awards campaign ====
By April 2022, Marvel Studios and Disney planned to submit Hawkeye in the various limited series categories for the Primetime Emmy Awards, but ultimately submitted the series for Outstanding Comedy Series and related comedy categories. Commentators felt this change opened up the possibility for the series to be renewed for a second season.

== Documentary special ==
In February 2021, the documentary series Marvel Studios: Assembled was announced. The specials go behind the scenes of the MCU films and television series with cast members and additional creatives. The special on this series, "The Making of Hawkeye", featuring Renner, was released on Disney+ on February 9, 2022. It was originally intended to release on January 19, 2022.

== Spin-off ==
A spin-off series starring Alaqua Cox as Maya Lopez / Echo was in early development for Disney+ by March 2021, with Etan Cohen and Emily Cohen set to write and executive produce. Echo was later officially announced in November, when Marion Dayre was revealed to be serving as head writer. Sydney Freeland and Catriona McKenzie direct the series. McClarnon and D'Onofrio reprise their roles from Hawkeye, and are joined by Charlie Cox as Matt Murdock / Daredevil, reprising his role from past MCU media. Chaske Spencer, Tantoo Cardinal, Devery Jacobs, Cody Lightning, and Graham Greene also star. The first episode employs flashbacks to help explain Lopez's backstory, including her appearances on Hawkeye, with Renner appearing through archive footage. Echo was released simultaneously on Disney+ and Hulu in its entirety on January 9, 2024, as part of Phase Five and under the "Marvel Spotlight" banner.
