= List of Hawkeye supporting characters =

This page lists the supporting characters of Hawkeye with some of them being exclusive to the Ultimate Marvel reality.

== Supporting characters ==
- Bangs – Weapons and explosives specialist of the W.C.A.
- Dominic Fortune – A soldier of fortune with a connection to Mockingbird's past.
- London – Researcher and developer of the W.C.A.
- Rover – A Bio-Com (Biological Combat Unit created by the Secret Empire) rescued by Hawkeye.
- Twitchy – Senior intelligence analyst of the W.C.A.
- Grills – A man who lives in Hawkeye's building and owns a rooftop grill on which he barbecues for his friends. He knows Clint Barton is Hawkeye, but insistently thinks the latter is "Hawkguy". Grills was later killed by the Tracksuit Mafia.

=== Allies ===
- Avengers – Earth's mightiest heroes. Hawkeye's friends and teammates.
- Kate Bishop – Member of the Young Avengers, and Clint's protégé/successor as Hawkeye.
- Mockingbird – Former S.H.I.E.L.D. agent. Hawkeye's ex-wife, former lover and frequent partner.
- Black Widow (Natasha Romanoff) – Former Russian spy turned S.H.I.E.L.D. agent who becomes Hawkeye's close friend and occasional professional partner.
- Deadpool – Deadpool has fought with and against Hawkeye depending on the scenario, but has recently become a close friend.
- Jorge Latham – Former employee of Cross Technological Enterprises and trusted friend of Hawkeye.
- Captain America (Steve Rogers) – Super-Soldier and Avenger. Hawkeye's friend and mentor.
- Sandman (Flint Marko)- Supervillain. Befriended Hawkeye during his attempt to reform.
- Jim Scully – Former superpowered adventurer and hired enforcer.
- Silver Sable – Symkarian mercenary and leader of the Wild Pack.
- Lucky the Pizza Dog – Clint's dog, who he adopts in the first issue of Hawkeye (2012) written by Matt Fraction. Barton first encounters the dog with the Tracksuit Mafia, and offers him a bite of pizza. In a fight with the gang, the dog defends Barton and loses an eye, along with other serious injuries. Barton takes him to a nearby veterinary clinic. The name tag on the dog's collar says "Arrow", but Barton wants to rename him.
  - Lucky appears in a post-launch update of the video game Marvel's Avengers.
  - Lucky appears in Hawkeye (2021), portrayed by animal actors Jolt and Eevee. This version is a Golden Retriever who was saved and adopted by Kate Bishop before she met Clint Barton.
  - Lucky appears in The Marvels (2023). He and Bishop, back in a NYC apartment, are met by Kamala Khan who is forming a Young Avengers team.
  - Lucky appears in Lego Marvel Avengers: Strange Tails (2025).

=== Family ===
- Barney Barton – Hawkeye's brother and former undercover FBI agent. Later became a costumed supervillain known as Trickshot, Hawkeye's archenemy.
- Edith Barton – Hawkeye's mother. Deceased.
- Harold Barton – Hawkeye's father. Deceased.
- Ben Morse – Mockingbird's brother and Hawkeye's former brother-in-law.
- Susan Morse – Mockingbird's mother and Hawkeye's former mother-in-law.

=== Family in other versions ===
- Laura Barton – The wife of Clint Barton in the comics' Ultimate Marvel reality. Laura had long known Clint Barton and had married him sometime prior to The Ultimates 2. Together they had three kids: Callum Barton, Lewis Barton and baby Nicole Barton. Clint would call them before every mission in case he never came back. Laura and their three children were killed when a traitor (later revealed to be Black Widow) sold them out to a black-ops team.
  - Laura Barton appears in media set in the Marvel Cinematic Universe, portrayed by Linda Cardellini.

=== Love interests ===
- Sheila Danning – Head of Public Relations at Cross Technological Enterprises. Betrayed Hawkeye to Crossfire.
- Eden – A tattooed lady and a member of the Keibler Circus, brief encounter.
- Barbara "Bobbi" Morse – Also known as Mockingbird, Hawkeye met her shortly after his relationship with the Scarlet Witch, when they were both Avengers. After joining the Defenders they wed. Together they led the West Coast Avengers until Mephisto killed her. She later came back to life but was revealed to be a Skrull in disguise.
- Natasha Romanoff – Black Widow and Hawkeye cooperated to take down Stark industries, but when Black Widow's amnesia's effects vanished she became an Avenger. In order to impress her, Hawkeye turned to crime until he realized he wasn't impressing her and joined the Avengers as well. They formed a perfect duo and worked together on different occasions, this leading to them forming a relationship. But Iron Man was worried the relationship would compromise missions so he forced them to break off their romance.
- Moonstone (Karla Sofen) – fellow Thunderbolt
- She-Hulk (Jennifer Walters) – Hawkeye and She-Hulk shared a short relationship, which She-Hulk broke off because of Hawkeye's personality.
- Scarlet Witch (Wanda Maximoff) – Hawkeye and the Scarlet Witch had a brief romance which angered the Vision, causing them to break it off.
  - In the Marvel Cinematic Universe, Barton and Maximoff have a close friendship, similar to that of an older brother and younger sister. Their friendship began in Avengers: Age of Ultron, and continued in Captain America: Civil War and Avengers: Endgame.
- Wasp (Janet van Dyne) – After Wasp broke up with Hank Pym, she started a relationship with Hawkeye which ended when Thor killed her.

== Employers ==
- Carson Carnival of Travelling Wonders – A traveling carnival where a young Hawkeye first met Swordsman and Trick Shot.
- Cross Technological Enterprises – A technological research and development company where Hawkeye worked as chief of security.
- Keibler Circus – Formerly known as the Tiboldt Circus.
- World Counter-terrorism Agency – An anti-terrorist organization founded by Mockingbird.

== Enemies ==
- A.I.M. – Advanced Idea Mechanics. International terrorist organization.
- Albino – A scientist specialising in mutagenics. Able to replicate superhuman abilities through technological means.
- Baron Zemo – The son of an elite Nazi scientist. Gifted intellect and master strategist. Skilled in various forms of combat.
- Batroc's Brigade – A team of mercenaries led by Batroc the Leaper.
- Blind Justice – A vigilante known to use lethal force.
- Bobcat – An acrobatic criminal and leader of the Claws.
- Bullet Biker – A former member of Carson Carnival of Travelling Wonders and stunt motorcyclist turned criminal.
- Claws – A team of acrobatic criminals. They are dressed exactly like their leader Bobcat as a tactic to confuse their enemies.
- Crossfire – A former CIA agent turned subversive supervillain and arms dealer. The closest thing Hawkeye has to an archenemy.
- Dark Ocean Society – A Japanese secret society of samurai warriors.
- Death-Throws – A team of juggling supervillains often hired by Crossfire.
- Death T.H.R.O.W.S. – Techno Hybrid Remotely Operated Weapons Systems. Crossfire's robotic army formerly known as Magnum Z's.
- Firefox – A cyborg assassin for the Russian government.
- Hood – Parker Robbins is a crime lord who rose to power via his magical cloak and pair of boots with supernatural abilities, such as teleportation and invisibility. He can also channel magic through his guns.
- Javelynn – A supervillain hired by the Secret Empire. Skilled javelin thrower and athlete.
- Kazimierz "Kazi the Clown" Kazimierczak – An assassin hired by the Tracksuit Mafia to kill Barton and his friends at the apartment. He was responsible for making Barton deaf by putting two of his arrows into Barton's ears.
  - Kazi appears in Hawkeye (2021), portrayed by Fra Fee. This version is a lieutenant of the Tracksuit Mafia.
- Lotus Newmark – Criminal mastermind and skilled martial artist.
- Orb – A deformed motorcycling supervillain.
- Phantom Rider – Jaime Slade. Ancestor of the original Phantom Rider. Inherited gunslinger skills and ghostly appearance.
- Phantom Rider – Lincoln Slade. Brother of the original Phantom Rider, now a vengeful spirit.
- Monica Rappaccini – Supreme Scientist of A.I.M.
- Secret Empire – A subversive organization.
- Silencer – An assassin employed by Crossfire. Able to nullify sound.
- Alexei Shostakov – Former KGB agent and Red Guardian. Later became the new Ronin.
- Stone Perfs – A street gang employed by Lotus Newmark.
- Swordsman – Expert swordsman and athlete. Hawkeye's former mentor.
- Taskmaster – Mercenary for hire and henchmen instructor. Has the ability to replicate physical movement using "photographic reflexes".
- Terminizer – A vigilante with a murderous vendetta against the Stone Perfs. Revealed to be a pre-teen boy.
- Tracksuit Mafia – Dubbed the Tracksuit Draculas and the Tracksuit Bros., this is the tracksuit-wearing gang in Fraction's Hawkeye series who Barton continually runs into. They are responsible for the death of Grills.
- Trick Shot – Buck Chisholm. Highly skilled archer. Hawkeye's former mentor.
- Viper – A master of espionage. Former leader of Hydra and the Secret Empire.
