= Charity auction =

Fundraising event

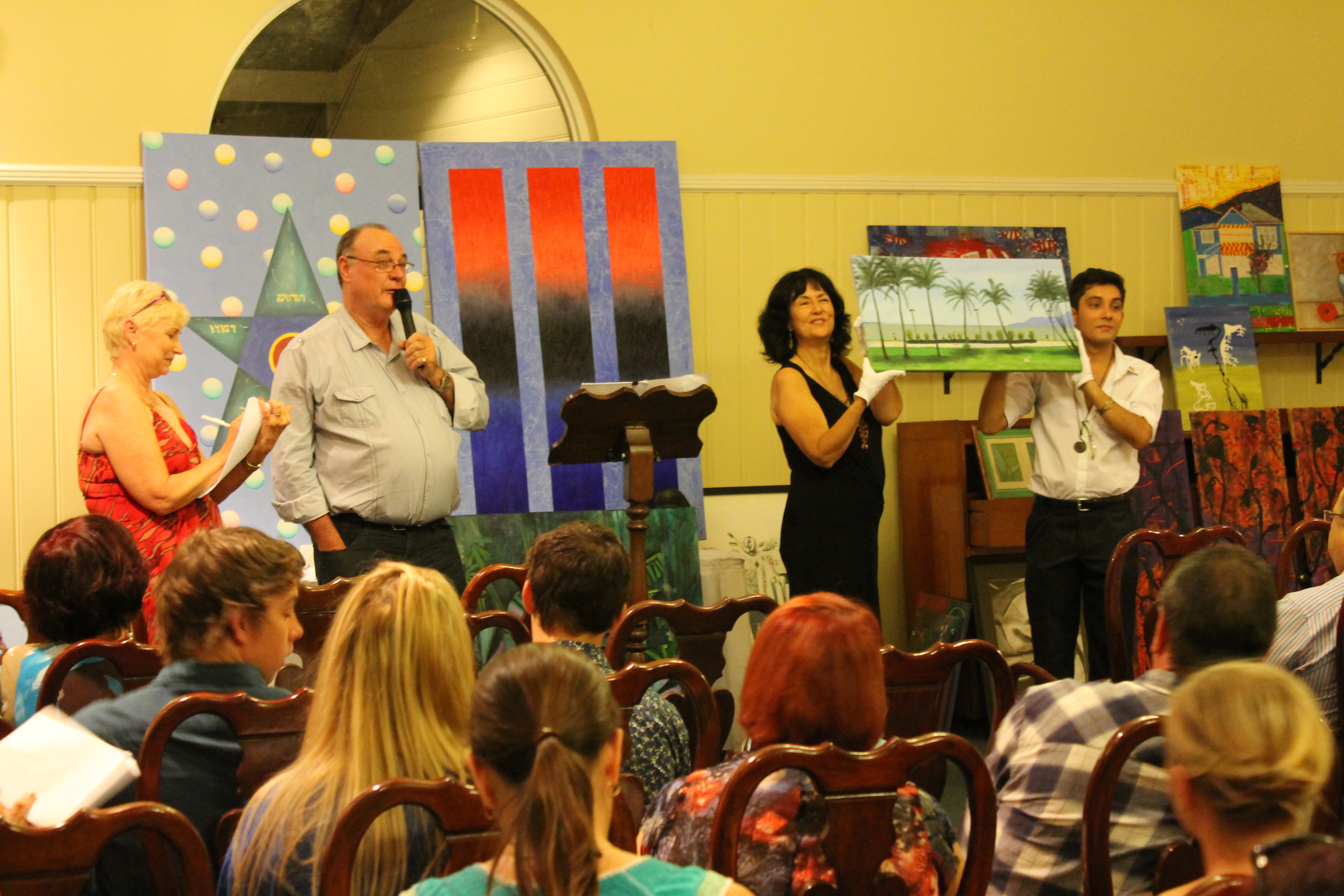
Declan Crouch Fund Charity Art Auction in 2012

Charity auctions are a way of raising funds for charities. These events are typically hosted in hotels or ballrooms, and dinner or cocktails may be served to guests. Charity auctions aimed at business leaders and other well-off potential donors often take the form of a formal gala.

According to the New York Times, items that sell well in such auctions are experiential items that cannot typically be bought in the store, including meetings with celebrities, an autographed guitar, and naming rights for characters in a forthcoming novel. In one notable example, Musician Eric Clapton sold 100 of his guitars in a charity auction in 1999 and raised $5 million for his substance abuse treatment facility.

In a charity auction the winning payment benefits a cause that is presumably valued by the bidder as well as competing bidders. Thus, the bidder receives a benefit from his own payment – both the item won and the value the donation supports the organization – and other bidders do as well, as their charity is supported. Therefore, bidders have two objectives that could be in conflict with one another: to win items that they value but also to support a charitable cause in part by driving up the price.

This makes the charity auction a public good, and that means that bidders may be incentivized to lose. This introduces a free-rider problem. If the free-rider problem dominates, then bids and consequently auction revenues would be depressed. On the other hand, bids could rise because they are subsidized by charitable sentiment Theoretical work has investigated the properties of different formats of charity auctions under the assumption that bidders care about the charity's revenue. The general result is that private benefits from charitable giving can translate into a “charity premium,” an increase in auction revenue resulting from charitable donations.

== Different Academic Approaches to Charity Research ==
There are three primary approaches to academic research on charity auctions: (1) utility-based (Economics discipline), (2) appeals-based (Marketing discipline), and (3) societal-based (Sociology discipline).

== Altruism ==
Altruism is commonly considered to be the principle motive in donation behavior, and this altruism could very much depend on the proportion of the proceeds that is donated to charity. Altruism is often confused with empathy, leading to paradoxes such as avoiding fundraisers.

== See also ==
- Charity of the My Little Pony: Friendship Is Magic fandom
