= Rhys Thomas (director) =

Welsh director and producer (born 1979)

- Born: Morgan Rhys Thomas; 18 September 1979 (age 46); Cowbridge, Wales
- Education: Trinity College, Dublin
- Occupations: Director, Producer, Writer
- Years active: 2004–present

Rhys Thomas (born 18 September 1979) is a Welsh director and producer best known for his work on Saturday Night Live for NBC, in which he served as Film Unit producer and director of shorts and music, winning an Emmy Award in 2015, and the series Documentary Now! for IFC.

== Career ==
Rhys Thomas became the Saturday Night Live Film Unit producer in 2005 and in 2010 began directing shorts, music videos and commercial parodies for the show. He also directed and produced the SNL opening credit sequence in 2012–2018 and the opening credits for the Saturday Night Live 40th Anniversary Special, which he also produced and won the Primetime Emmy Award for Outstanding Variety Special in 2015. In 2015 he made his feature film debut with the film Staten Island Summer written by Colin Jost. That year he also directed John Mulaney’s Emmy nominated stand up special The Comeback Kid for Netflix.

Thomas is also a co-creator and director of the Emmy nominated IFC series, Documentary Now!. In 2016, he also produced the Adele Live in New York City concert special for NBC, for which he earned his fourth Prime Time Emmy nomination. He also produced and directed the opening credits for the talk show Late Night with Seth Meyers. In 2017, he produced and directed all six episodes of the Amazon Prime show Comrade Detective starring Channing Tatum and Joseph Gordon-Levitt. He teamed with Bill Hader again in 2018 for Pringles' first ever Super Bowl commercial.

In 2021, Thomas served as an executive producer and director of episodes one, two, and six of the Marvel Cinematic Universe television series Hawkeye.

== Filmography ==
Film

- Staten Island Summer (2015)

Television

Year	Title	Director	Producer	Notes
2009–2016	Saturday Night Live	Yes	Yes	SNL shorts
2012–present	Saturday Night Live Opening Credits	Yes	Yes	
2013	Newsreaders	Yes	No	3 episodes
2015	The Comeback Kid	Yes	No	
2015	Saturday Night Live 40th Anniversary Special	Segment	Yes	
2015	Adele Live in New York City	Yes	Yes	Opening Sequence
2015–2022	Documentary Now!	Yes	Executive	Also creator
2016–present	Late Night with Seth Meyers	Yes	No	Opening Titles
2017	Comrade Detective	Yes	Executive	6 episodes
2018	Unbreakable Kimmy Schmidt	Yes	No	
2018	Kansas City	Yes	Executive	Pilot
2019	John Mulaney & the Sack Lunch Bunch	Yes	No	
2021	Chad	Yes	Executive	Pilot
2021	Hawkeye	Yes	Executive	3 episodes
2026	The Fall and Rise of Reggie Dinkins	Yes	No	Pilot

== Accolades ==
Year	Award	Category	Title	Result	Ref.
2022	Peabody Awards	Entertainment	Documentary Now!	Nominated	
