= Jonathan Igla =

Writer and producer

- Occupations: Writer, producer
- Years active: 2010–present
- Notable work: Mad Men; Hawkeye

Jonathan Igla is a writer and producer. He served the head writer and executive producer for the Disney+ series Hawkeye. Igla has written and produced for numerous shows, including Mad Men, Pitch, Sorry for Your Loss, Shut Eye, and Bridgerton.

== Career ==
Igla is most well known for his work on the AMC series Mad Men. He began as a writer in 2010 and ended up as an executive story editor. In 2015, he wrote for the Showtime series Masters of Sex. In 2016, he was a writer and co-producer for the show Pitch. The following year, he worked as a writer and producer for the second season of Shut Eye, writing two episodes. He served as a supervising producer and writer for the Facebook Watch drama series Sorry for Your Loss. In 2020, he co-produced the Netflix period drama Bridgerton. In September 2019, it was announced that he would be the head writer for the Disney+ show Hawkeye, which premiered in November 2021. In 2021, he was nominated for the Primetime Emmy Award for Outstanding Drama Series.

== Filmography ==
Year	Title	Credited as		Notes
Year	Title	Writer	Producer	Notes
2010–15	Mad Men	Yes	No	Wrote 6 episodes, also story editor and executive story editor
2015	Masters of Sex	Yes	No	"High Anxiety"
2016	Pitch	Yes	Yes	Co-producer, wrote "Wear It"
2017	Shut Eye	Yes	Yes	Wrote 2 episodes
2018	Sorry for Your Loss	Yes	Yes	Supervising producer, wrote "17 Unheard Messages"
2018	Age of Sail	Yes	No	Short film
2020	Bridgerton	No	Yes	Co-executive producer
2021	Hawkeye	Yes	Executive	Creator, wrote 2 episodes

== Awards and nominations ==
Year	Award	Category	Work	Result	Ref(s)
2011	OFTA Television Award	Best Writing in a Drama Series	Mad Men	Won	
2011	Writers Guild of America Awards	Drama Series	Mad Men	Won	
2013	OFTA Television Award	Best Writing in a Drama Series	Mad Men	Nominated	
2013	Writers Guild of America Awards	Drama Series	Mad Men	Nominated	
2014	OFTA Television Award	Best Writing in a Drama Series	Mad Men	Won	
2014	Writers Guild of America Awards	Drama Series	Mad Men	Nominated	
2015	Writers Guild of America Awards	Drama Series	Mad Men	Nominated	
2015	Writers Guild of America Awards	Episodic Drama (for "A Day's Work")	Mad Men	Nominated	
2016	Writers Guild of America Awards	Drama Series	Mad Men	Won	
2021	Primetime Emmy Awards	Outstanding Drama Series	Bridgerton	Nominated	
