= America (disambiguation) =

America is, in common English usage, a short-form name for the United States of America.

America or América may also refer to:

== Places ==
=== Mexico ===
- América, Tamaulipas
- América II, Tamaulipas

=== United States ===
- America, Illinois
- America, Indiana
- America, Oklahoma
- America Lake (South Dakota)
- Lake America, internationally recognized as Lake Ontario

=== Other places ===
- América, Buenos Aires, Argentina
- La América, Commune of Medellín, Colombia
- America, Limburg, Netherlands
- 916 America, an asteroid
- The Americas, a landmass comprising the continents of North America and South America

== Arts, entertainment, and media ==
=== Fictional characters ===
- America, in the 2023 American romantic comedy drama movie Beautiful Disaster
- America Chavez, superhero from Marvel Comics

=== Films ===
- America (1924 film), by D. W. Griffith
- America (1986 film), by Robert Downey Sr.
- America (2009 film), an American made-for-television film
- América (2010 film), from Portugal
- America (2011 film), from Puerto Rico
- America (2022 film), mainly Israeli film
- America: Freedom to Fascism, a 2006 documentary
- America: Imagine the World Without Her, a 2014 documentary based on a book by Dinesh D'Souza
- America: The Motion Picture, a 2021 American animated film
- America America, a 1963 American film by Elia Kazan

=== Literature ===
- "America" (Judge Dredd story), by John Wagner
- America (novel), a 2002 young adult novel by E. R. Frank
- "America" (poem), 1956, by Allen Ginsberg
- "America" (short story), by Orson Scott Card
- America, a Jake Grafton novel by Stephen Coonts
- "America", a poem by Walt Whitman from Leaves of Grass
- America, a 1986 book by Jean Baudrillard
- America (The Book), a 2006 book by the staff of The Daily Show with Jon Stewart

=== Music ===
==== Groups and labels ====
- America (band)
- America Records (France), a jazz record label

==== Albums ====
- America (America album), 1971
- America (Kurtis Blow album), 1985
- America (Dan Deacon album), 2012
- America (John Fahey album), 1971
- America (Havalina album), 1999
- America (Julio Iglesias album), 1976
- America (Modern Talking album), 2001
- America (Wadada Leo Smith album), 2009
- America, 1989, by George Adams
- America: An Album for All Ages, 2009, by Bobby Susser
- America – The EP, a 2006 EP by Rebecca St. James
- América & En Vivo, a 1992 EP by Luis Miguel
- America (Thirty Seconds to Mars album), 2018

==== Songs ====
- "America" (Deuce song), 2012
- "America" (Neil Diamond song), 1980
- "America" (KBC Band song), 1987
- "America" (Waylon Jennings song)
- "America" (Killing Joke song), 1988
- "America" (Prince song), 1985
- "America" (Razorlight song), 2006
- "America" (Simon & Garfunkel song), 1968
- "America" (Sufjan Stevens song), 2020
- "America" (West Side Story song), 1957
- "America (My Country, 'Tis of Thee)", a patriotic song of the US
- "America the Beautiful", a patriotic anthem of the US
- "America", by Tracy Chapman from Where You Live
- "America", by Kevin Coyne from Heartburn, 1976
- "America", by David Essex from the 1974 album David Essex
- "America", by Imagine Dragons from Night Visions
- "America", by Jewel from 0304
- "America", by London Grammar from their 2021 album Californian Soil
- "America", 1982, by Motörhead from Iron Fist
- "America", by Nas from his untitled ninth studio album
- "América", by José Luis Perales
- "America", by Royce da 5'9" from Layers
- "America", by Santana featuring P.O.D. from Shaman
- "America", by Bree Sharp from her 1999 debut album A Cheap and Evil Girl
- "America", by Steppenwolf from Monster
- "America", by Bobby Susser from America: An Album for All Ages
- "America", by Wu-Tang Clan and Killah Priest from America Is Dying Slowly
- "America (Never Been)", by Car Seat Headrest from How to Leave Town

=== Radio and television stations ===
- América 2, an Argentine television station
- America One, an American over-the-air television network
- América Paraguay, a Paraguayan television network
- América Televisión, a Peruvian television network

=== Television ===
- América (Brazilian TV series), a telenovela
- America (American TV series), a talk show
- America: A Personal History of the United States, a BBC documentary series
- America: The Story of Us, a six-part documentary on the history of the US
- The Americas (TV series), an NBC nature documentary series

=== Other uses in arts, entertainment, and media ===
- America (magazine), published by the Jesuits
- America (toilet), a sculpture by Maurizio Cattelan
- America (video game), 2001

== People ==
- América Alonso (1936–2022), Venezuelan actress
- América Barrios (1917–2001), Cuban actress
- America Waldo Bogle (1844–1903), American pioneer
- America Chedister (1895–1975), American actress
- America McCutchen Drennan (1830–1903), American educator and missionary
- America Ferrera (born 1984), American actress
- America Foster (born 1997) British-Jamaican member of the American band Major Lazer
- America Martin (born 1980), American artist
- America Meredith (born 1972), American artist
- America Newton (1835–1917), American pioneer
- America Olivo (born 1978), American actress
- America W. Robinson (1855–1912), American educator
- América del Pilar Rodrigo, Argentinian botanist
- America Iglesias Thatcher (1907–1989), Puerto Rican labor activist
- America Thayer (died 2021), American murder victim
- America Young (born 1984), American actress
- America Vera Zavala (born 1976), Swedish politician

== Ships and boats ==
- America (yacht), winner of the America's Cup in 1851
- America-class amphibious assault ship, of the U.S.
- America-class steamship, Cunard sidewheel transatlantic steamships
  - RMS America, first of the America-class
- French ship America (1788), a Téméraire-class ship of the French Navy
  - America-class ship of the line, derived from the French ship America
- Grande America, an Italian cargo ship, sunken on 12 March 2019 near France
- HMS America, any of several ships of the Royal Navy
- SS America, any of several ships of that name
- USS America, any of several ships of the US Navy
- Herreshoff America, an American catboat design

== Sports ==
- América de Cali, an association football (soccer) club from Cali, Colombia
- América Football Club (disambiguation)
- América Managua, an association football (soccer) club from Managua, Nicaragua
- Club América, an association football (soccer) club from Mexico City
- Copa América (Spanish and Portuguese for "America Cup"), association football (soccer) competition in South America

== Transportation ==
- America (aircraft), used by Richard E. Byrd on a 1927 transatlantic flight
- America (airship), flown in 1907 and 1909 attempts to reach the North Pole, and a 1910 attempt to cross the Atlantic
- America (American automobile)
- America (Spanish automobile)

== Other uses ==
- Apollo 17 Command/Service Module (callsign "America")
- America (beetle), a genus of insects in the family Disteniidae
- American (word)
- Americas (terminology)
- Naming of the Americas

== See also ==
- Air America (disambiguation)
- American (disambiguation)
- Americana (disambiguation)
- Amerigo Vespucci (1454–1512), for whom the Americas were named
- Amerika (disambiguation)
- Ameryka (disambiguation)
- Amerrique Mountains
- Amreeka, a 2009 film
- Umrika, a 2015 Indian film by Prashant Nair
- Captain America (disambiguation)
- In America (disambiguation)
- Pan-American (disambiguation)
- The American (disambiguation)
- The Americans (disambiguation)
- Armorica
