= The American =

The American may refer to:

== Film ==
- The American (1927 film), a Western starring Charles Ray and Bessie Love
- The American (1998 film), a 1998 PBS television adaptation of the Henry James novel
- The American (2010 film), an American thriller starring George Clooney
- The American (2023 film), a 2023 New Zealand–Polish drama also known as Joika

== Music ==
- The American, a 1999 album by Angie Aparo
- The American, a 1998 album by Martin Sexton
- "The American", a 1981 single by Scottish rock band Simple Minds

== Print publications ==
- The American (novel), an 1877 novel by Henry James
- The American (magazine), a magazine published by the American Enterprise Institute
- The American Magazine, a literary periodical published from 1906 to 1956
- The American (comics), a comic book series by Mark Verheiden
- The American, a 2006 thriller by Andrew Britton
- The American, 2010 retitling of Martin Booth's 1990 novel A Very Private Gentleman

== Other uses ==
- American Athletic Conference, one of the major U.S. collegiate sports conferences
- The American (statue), an unrealized bronze outdoor sculpture planned for Tulsa, Oklahoma
- "The American", character played by Rory Albanese on the satirical podcast, The Bugle
- "The American", character played by Mike Skinner in the first season of motoring programme The Grand Tour.

== See also ==
- America (disambiguation)
- American (disambiguation)
- The Americans (disambiguation)
