= Saborit =

Saborit is a surname. Notable people with the surname include:

- Enric Saborit (born 1992), Spanish football defender
- Juan Saborit (born 1956), Cuban hurdler

== See also ==
- Alexis Saborit, perpetrator of the killing of America Thayer
