= Yelena Belova (Marvel Cinematic Universe) =

Superheroine portrayed by Florence Pugh

- Marvel Cinematic Universe character
- Florence Pugh as Yelena Belova in Thunderbolts* (2025)
- First appearance: Black Widow (2021)
- Based on: Yelena Belova by: Devin Grayson; J. G. Jones
- Adapted by: Eric Pearson; Jac Schaeffer; Ned Benson
- Portrayed by: Florence Pugh; Violet McGraw (young)

In-universe information
- Alias: Black Widow
- Occupation: Contract killer, New Avenger
- Affiliation: New Avengers; Thunderbolts; Black Widows; Red Room
- Weapon: Dual batons
- Family: Natasha Romanoff (adopted sister); Alexei Shostakov (adopted father); Melina Vostokoff (adopted mother)
- Origin: Soviet Union
- Nationality: Russian

Yelena Belova is a fictional character portrayed by Florence Pugh in the Marvel Cinematic Universe (MCU) film franchise based on the Marvel Comics character of the same name. She is depicted as a Black Widow assassin who was trained in the Russian-based Red Room and went on to become one of the greatest child assassins in the world. She is also the adopted sister of Natasha Romanoff.

Following her freedom from General Dreykov's chemical subjugation, Belova joins Romanoff and their adopted parents Alexei Shostakov and Melina Vostokoff in destroying the Red Room and killing Dreykov. Following Romanoff's death, falling victim to the Blip and being resurrected, Belova begins to work as a contract killer for Valentina Allegra de Fontaine, putting her in conflict with Clint Barton. She goes on to join a team of other contract killers in de Fontaine's employ to form the Thunderbolts. The team is later rebranded as the New Avengers.

Pugh appeared as the character in the films Black Widow (2021), Thunderbolts* (2025), and Spider-Man: Brand New Day (2026), as well as the Disney+ miniseries Hawkeye (2021) and will return in the films Avengers: Doomsday (2026) and Avengers: Secret Wars (2027). An alternate version of Belova appeared in the Disney+ adult animated series Marvel Zombies (2025), also voiced by Pugh. American actress Violet McGraw has also portrayed a younger Belova. Pugh's portrayal has received a positive reception.

== Fictional character biography ==
=== Early life ===
Yelena Belova was recruited by General Dreykov for an undercover KGB operation led by super soldier Alexei Shostakov and Melina Vostokoff. Due to Belova's young age, she was the only member of the group who was unaware of their assigned mission. Instead, she believed them to be a real family.

After Shostakov completed his mission in 1995, the family escaped by plane to Cuba, where they met Dreykov and gave him stolen research. With the mission complete, Belova and Romanoff were sent to train as Black Widow assassins in the Red Room. Belova's first test was to lure her close friend, Anya, out into the woods, only to be shot by their handler. Belova emerged from her training as one of the world's best child assassins. Following Romanoff's defection, Belova was chemically subjugated by the Red Room to prevent further desertions.

=== Destroying the Red Room ===
In 2016, Belova is freed from her chemical subjugation by a rogue Widow whom she was initially sent to kill. Following an encounter with a synthetic gas that neutralizes the chemical conditioning, Belova cuts a tracker out of her leg and goes into hiding. Hoping to free the other Widows, Belova sends the antidote to Romanoff from a safe house in Budapest, expecting that she and the other Avengers would receive the package and use it to take down the Red Room.

A few weeks later, Belova encounters the now-fugitive Romanoff, who is on the run after violating the Sokovia Accords. (Note: As depicted in Captain America: Civil War (2016)) Romanoff, who has come to find her after finally finding the package of Red Dust, is under the belief that the Red Room is gone. Belova quickly disabuses her of this notion, just before Red Room agents sent to retrieve the Dust attack Yelena's safe house. After escaping, they agree to work together to destroy the Red Room.

Attemping to find its location, Belova and Romanoff break Shostakov out of prison. He subsequently directs them to Vostokoff, who is a member of Dreykov's inner circle. There, Romanoff convinces Vostokoff to help them. Belova, Romanoff, Shostakov, and Vostokoff officially reunite as a family and sneak into the Red Room together, which is now an airborne facility circling the globe. Once inside, Belova exposes the Widows to the Dust to free them from chemical subjugation while Romanoff downloads the worldwide locations of other Widows into a hard drive. To destroy the agency for good, Vostokoff sabotages the Red Room's airborne engines, sending the facility into free-fall. Seeing Dreykov attempt to escape on a plane, Belova blows it up, finally killing him.

After finally destroying the agency, Romanoff gives Belova the last vial of Dust they have and the hard drive with the locations of the remaining chemically subjugated Widows. Belova departs with Vostokoff and Shostakov after saying goodbye to Romanoff, setting off to synthesize more of the gas and free the remaining Widows.

=== Going after Clint Barton ===
In 2018, Belova is still working to deprogram chemically subjugated Widows around the globe. As part of her ongoing mission, she travels with fellow ex-Widow Sonya to the house of Anna, a fellow Widow agent. After a brief altercation, Anna reveals that she has already been deprogrammed. Belova and Sonya explain their mission and apologize for attacking her. Belova excuses herself to use the restroom and is killed by the Blip moments later.

Belova is returned to life in 2023 after the events of Avengers: Endgame, still inside Anna's house. Attempting to help her, Anna offers to set her up with contract work as a hitman, but Belova brushes her off, intent on finding her sister. After learning of Romanoff's death, Belova eventually accepts Anna's offer and begins work as a contract killer for Valentina Allegra de Fontaine, a high level government official who works for the C.I.A..

In December 2024, Belova visits Romanoff's grave and is met by de Fontaine, who tasks Belova with killing Clint Barton, telling her that he is to blame for her sister's death. Belova tracks Barton to New York City and ambushes him, entangling herself in conflict with Maya Lopez, a street thug, and Barton's protogé, Kate Bishop. During the ensuing fight, she is unmasked by Barton and escapes. She confronts Bishop at her apartment and reveals that she was hired to kill Barton. Belova attempts to convince Bishop that Barton is not the hero that Bishop worships, but Bishop rebuffs this. Belova follows Bishop's mother, Eleanor, and takes a video of her talking to Wilson Fisk before sending it to Bishop, stating Eleanor had hired her.

Belova attends the Bishop Christmas Party at the Rockefeller Center, where she is intercepted by Bishop, who tries to stop her from getting to Barton. Later on the ice rink, Belova confronts Barton and demands the truth about how her sister died. Barton complies, but Belova, still mourning, refuses to believe him. She attacks him once again, only pausing when Barton whistles at her—a secret signal that she had shared with Romanoff. Realizing how close he was to Romanoff, Belova accepts Barton's story, spares his life, and leaves.

=== Joining the New Avengers ===
By 2027, Belova is still working for de Fontaine. She is sent to Kuala Lumpur to destroy an O.X.E. lab for de Fontaine. Following this, Belova visits Shostakov and she tells him she feels lost and unfulfilled and has decided to stop working for de Fontaine. De Fontaine sends her on one last mission to a covert facility in Utah to kill the rogue agent Ava Starr. While following Starr, Belova is surprised by the arrival of other contract killers: former Captain America John Walker and former Red Room assassin Antonia Dreykov. The four fight, Starr eventually killing Dreykov, before the arrival of a man named Bob shocks the group out of fight mode in time for them to realize that their "mission" is a setup by de Fontaine to kill them all, as they are the last piece of evidence tying O.X.E. to anything illegal. With Bob's help, the group escapes, leaving him behind after he decides to sacrifice himself.

Shostakov finds Belova, Walker, and Starr walking in the desert. He dubs the group the "Thunderbolts", named after Belova's childhood soccer team. The team is attacked again by a convoy of de Fontaine's forces, but they are saved by Bucky Barnes, who apprehends them and intends to have them testify in de Fontaine's impeachment proceedings. Learning that Bob has survived and has been shipped to New York, the team infiltrate the former Avengers Tower in New York City, now renamed the "Watchtower," to find that Bob is an O.X.E. test subject who has miraculously survived the company's experiment. Said experiment has transformed Bob into an immensely powerful superhuman known as the Sentry.

De Fontaine manipulates the Sentry into attacking the team and he easily overpowers them, forcing them to escape. After he refuses to obey her order to kill them, de Fontaine hits the Sentry's kill switch which later turns Bob into his destructive alter ego, the Void, who starts turning everyone in his vicinity into shadows and engulfs the city in darkness. Realizing that Bob's consciousness is still there under the surface and that there might be a way to reach him, Belova enters the Void. After confronting her past life growing up in the Red Room, she reaches him and finds that Bob's consciousness has been consumed by his own traumas. The rest of the team follow in after Belova and help Bob confront the Void by reminding him that he is not alone. The show of support helps Bob overcome the Void, restoring the city to normal. With the threat neutralized, the team prepares to apprehend de Fontaine, only to be manipulated by her again into walking into a staged press conference. De Fontaine takes advantage of their surprise, using the moment to rebrand them as the New Avengers. Belova warns De Fontaine that she will regret it if she threatens them again.

By 2028, the New Avengers' Watchtower had completed construction and was now established as their primary base of operations, while Belova herself had repurposed a bathhouse into her personal office. Following an attack on the Department of Damage Control (DODC) detention center, Spider-Man seeks out Belova's assistance, believing the perpetrator's activities to fall under the Avengers' jurisdiction. Belova disagreed, feeling that the incident was too small in scope for her or the team to be of any assistance. Belova would later help Spider-Man uncover information about the perpetrator, a telepath named Jean Grey. Belova tells Spider-Man over a video call that Jean's sister, Sara, was also a telepath who died due to experiments conducted on her by the DODC, leading Spider-Man to realize its director Bill Metzger was lying to him about Jean's motives. Their conversation is interrupted by Spider-Man's friends MJ and Ned Leeds, and Belova expresses her compliments that Spider-Man is no longer isolating himself.

While on duty in the Watchtower, Belova and the New Avengers receive a distress signal from an extra-dimensional spacecraft. (Note: Identified offscreen as the Fantastic Four ship Excelsior entering their universe from Earth-828.)

== Alternate versions ==
=== Zombie outbreak ===
In an alternate universe where a zombie plague infected the world, Belova, Vostokoff, and Shostakov have been using technology to control and protect various zombies until they encounter Kamala Khan and Blade Knight. They discover that the S.H.I.E.L.D. device must be taken into outer space to request help from the Nova Corps, until the base is attacked by a zombie Okoye, leading an army of zombies for the Queen of the Dead. In a tragic battle, Belova, Kamala, Blade, and Shostakov manage to escape and she learns that Vostokoff was left behind in sacrificing herself, and decide to go into outer space. They take refuge in Helmut Zemo's sanctuary, The Raft, upon encountering Shang-Chi's group. However, they fall into a trap set by Zemo to be sacrificed to the Talokanil zombie horde, led by a zombie Namor. After the remaining team escapes, Belova stays to manually override the escape pod, sacrificing herself and toasts her fallen allies before getting infected, and the Raft floods completely. Belova returns as a zombie, along with other fallen now zombies, part of the Queen of the Dead's army.

== Concept and casting ==
Pugh was in negotiations to join the cast of Black Widow by March 2019. Marvel had been considering Pugh for the role since late 2018, but began looking at other actresses, including Saoirse Ronan, in early 2019. The studio returned to Pugh after she received strong reviews for her performance in the film Fighting with My Family (2019). The following month, Pugh was confirmed to have been cast in the film. American actress Violet McGraw was cast as a young Belova in Black Widow, and reprised her role in Thunderbolts*.

== Characterization ==
=== Appearances and depictions ===
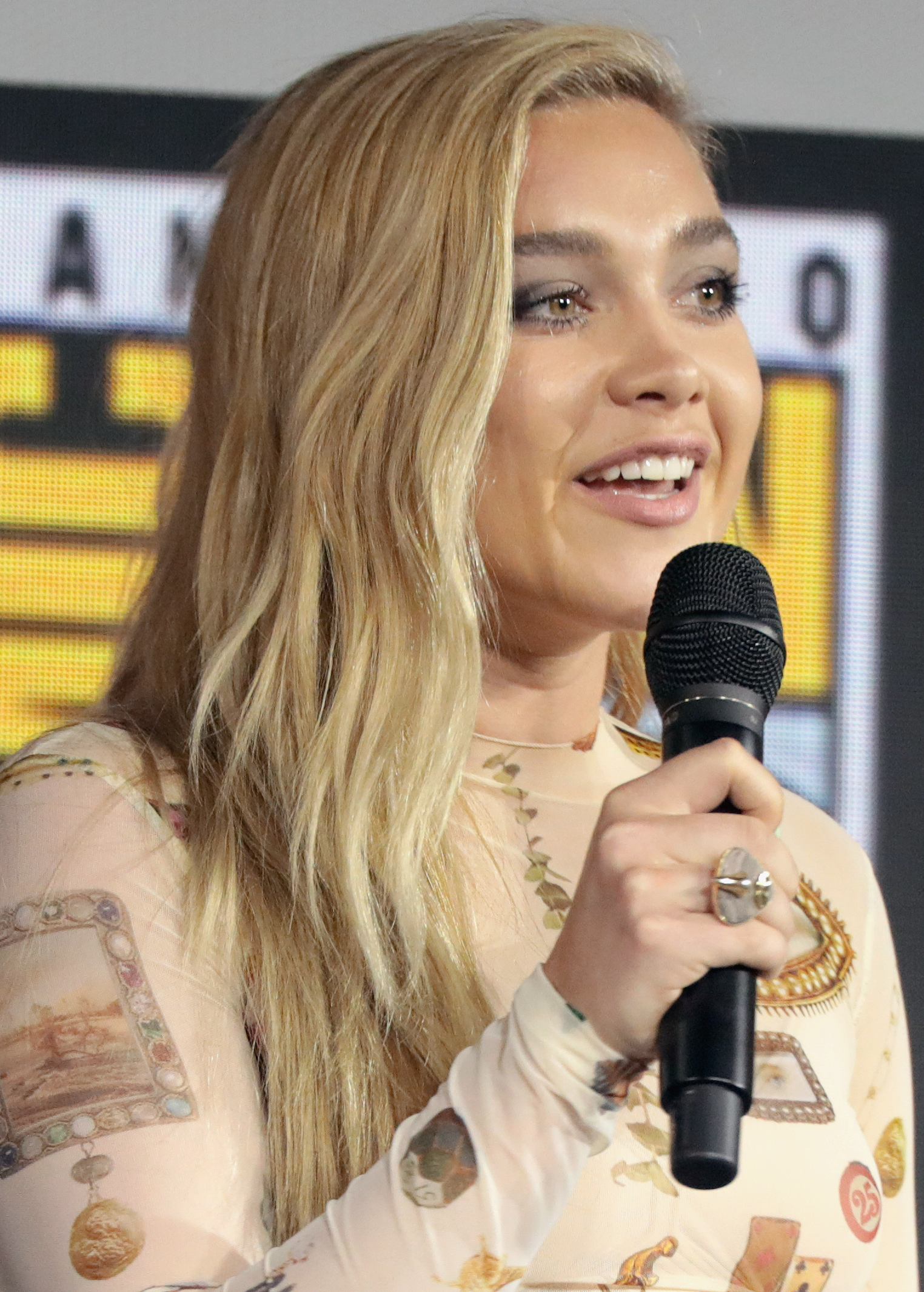
Pugh promoting Black Widow at the 2019 San Diego Comic-Con

Pugh first appeared as the character in Black Widow (2021), where director Cate Shortland said that Natasha Romanoff / Black Widow would be "handing [Belova] the baton" which would go on to "propel another female storyline". On her character, Pugh called Belova "a lethal weapon but also a bit of a kid", adding that she "has no clue how to live as a human being". Pugh characterized Belova's relationship with Romanoff as "a sister story that really homes in on grief, on pain, on abuse, on being a victim and living with being a victim". Johansson revealed that an early version of the script had a much more adversarial relationship between the sisters, with Belova intending to "dethrone" Romanoff as a spy; Johansson rejected that direction for the characters. Wanting to avoid this dynamic, Johansson described the relationship between the two characters as "a knowingness and a sisterhood". She felt that Belova would best stand on her own in comparison to Romanoff, while Pugh added there was a "generational difference" and that Belova is "unapologetic, and confident in herself, curious […] and emotionally brave".

Pugh next appeared as the character in the Disney+ series Hawkeye (2021). On the character, Pugh noted that the show "sets up a whole different challenge" as she was now up against her sister's fighting partner, Clint Barton. She added that it was "really wonderful to kind of jump ahead and see [how the character] has been surviving".

For Thunderbolts*, the actors were given substantial input into the portrayal of their characters in the film. Pugh said that her character has been affected by the traumatic events of recent MCU projects, including the death of Romanoff. (Note: As depicted in the film Avengers: Endgame (2019).) In the film, Belova jumps off the top of the Merdeka 118 without the use of stunt doubles in which Marvel Studios was initially reluctant to allow. Pugh noted that she had to push for the scenes to happen. Pugh also advocated for changes to the opening scene that resulted in the character performing the initial mission dressed in a sweatsuit rather than spy gear, reflective of her overall dour mood. Pugh also advocated for the script to include references to Romanoff's death, noting that "In the original script, there wasn't anything to do with Natasha". Throughout her MCU appearances, Pugh noted that Belova's actions have always shown that "she's always trying to help the person that maybe isn't as strong, or maybe needs a bit of love", citing her adoption of a dog in the post-credits scene of Black Widow, her treatment of Kate Bishop in Hawkeye, and her compassion towards Bob in Thunderbolts.

In 2025, Pugh voiced an alternate universe variant of Belova in the Disney+ animated series Marvel Zombies (2025) who sacrifices herself to help the remaining survivors escape a zombified version of Namor. In 2026, she appeared in the film Spider-Man: Brand New Day (2026) where she advises Spider-Man about an attack on the Department of Damage Control. Characters in the film identify Belova as the new Black Widow. Pugh is set to reprise her role in the film Avengers: Doomsday (2026) with the trailer showing Belova fighting the X-Men character Mystique.

=== Differences from the comics ===
The MCU version of Belova differs from her comic book counterpart in several respects, most notably in having been raised as Romanoff's sister, which is not an aspect of the comic book character, who was instead merely a fellow Red Room student. Physically, comic book Belova is relatively tall (5' 7") with blue eyes, while Florence Pugh, portraying Belova in the MCU, is 5' 3" with green eyes. An additional story element is that Belova in the MCU first meets Clint Barton while pursuing him in the belief that he killed Romanoff, while in the comics they first meet when Barton pursues Belova to stop her use of extreme methods to hunt down Hydra agents.

== Reception ==
Brian Tallerico of RogerEbert.com said Pugh was the MVP of Black Widow, and had found "just the right shades of strength and vulnerability". Caryn James at the BBC also praised Pugh in the film and said Belova was "more lived-in than most action-movie characters". Writing about Pugh's performance in Hawkeye, Carly Lane of Collider stated "The arrival of Florence Pugh's fan-favorite character shakes things up for the Disney+ series in a good way". The Direct noted that a "good chunk of the reactions towards the prequel praised Pugh's portrayal of Yelena, and the anticipation for her return in Hawkeye is high after the positive reception".

Caroline Siede of The A.V. Club, reviewing the Hawkeye episode "Ronin", felt that Pugh stole the show and thought that "everything that made Yelena Belova such a hit in the Black Widow movie is back and arguably better here". Reviewing the Hawkeye finale, "So This Is Christmas?", Siede praised Bishop and Belova, calling their "Princess Bride-style respectful friend fight" charming. She also felt that Romanoff's death finally truly mattered, finding it emotional to watch Barton and Belova fight through their pain. Ross Bonaime, reviewing the episode for Collider, liked the way the show integrated Belova into the story and making her essential to both Barton and Bishop's stories. Matt Purslow of IGN praised the scene of Barton and Belova fighting and grieving over Romanoff's death, although Purslow felt that the special whistle moment felt too convenient.

Pugh's role in Thunderbolts* also received positive reviews with Jane Coyle of the Associated Press writing that "Pugh commands every bit of the movie". Nicholas Barber of the BBC also praised Pugh's performance.

=== Accolades ===
Accolades received for Yelena Belova
Year	Work	Award	Recipient(s)	Result	Ref.
2021	Black Widow	People's Choice Awards	Female Movie Star of 2021	Nominated	
2021	Black Widow	People's Choice Awards	Action Movie Star of 2021	Nominated	
2022	Black Widow	Critics' Choice Super Awards	Best Actress in a Superhero Movie	Won	
2022	Hawkeye	Hollywood Critics Association TV Awards	Best Supporting Actress in a Streaming Series, Comedy	Nominated	
2025	Thunderbolts*	Kids' Choice Awards	Favorite Butt-Kicker	Nominated	
2025	Thunderbolts*	Astra Midseason Movie Awards	Best Actress	Won	
2025	Thunderbolts*	Critics' Choice Super Awards	Best Actress in a Superhero Movie	Won	
2026	Thunderbolts*	Saturn Awards	Best Supporting Actress in a Film	Nominated	

== See also ==
- Characters of the Marvel Cinematic Universe
