= In America =

In America may refer to:

- Within American soil
- In America (novel), a novel by Susan Sontag
- In America (film), a 2002 Irish film by Jim Sheridan
- In America (Defunkt album), a 1988 album by Defunkt
- In America (Kenny G album)
- "In America" (song), a song by the Charlie Daniels Band
- "In America", a song by Creed from My Own Prison
- "In America", a 1989 song by Fastbacks
- "In America", a series of CNN documentaries hosted by Soledad O'Brien

== See also ==
- Only in America (disambiguation)
