= The Americans (disambiguation) =

The Americans is a 2013 TV series set in the Cold War period.

The Americans may also refer to:

- Americans, citizens of the United States
- The Americans (1961 TV series), a TV series set during the American Civil War
- The Americans (band), a roots rock band from Los Angeles, California
- The Americans (commentary), a 1973 radio opinion piece by Gordon Sinclair
- The Americans (gang), a gang in Cape Flats area of Cape Town
- The Americans (novel), a 1979 novel by John Jakes
- The Americans (photography), a 1958 book of photographs by Robert Frank
- The Americans: The Democratic Experience, a 1973 American history book by Daniel J. Boorstin
- The Americans (2017), a short story in The Refugees
- Les Américans, a 1983 non-fiction book by Leo Sauvage

== See also ==
- America (disambiguation)
- American (word)
- American (disambiguation)
- The American (disambiguation)
