= Avengers (Marvel Cinematic Universe) =

Superhero team

- Marvel Cinematic Universe organization
- Logo of the Avengers
- First appearance: The Avengers (2012)
- Based on: The Avengers by: Stan Lee; Jack Kirby
- Adapted by: Zak Penn; Joss Whedon

In-universe information
- Type: Superhero
- Founder: Nick Fury
- Founded: 2012
- Fate: Assembling as of 2027
- Address: Avengers Compound, Upstate New York; Avengers Tower, New York City
- Location: Primarily Earth, some actions throughout the galaxy (Note: As depicted in Avengers: Endgame (2019))
- Leader: Steve Rogers (2012, 2015–2016, 2018, 2023); Tony Stark (2016–2018); Natasha Romanoff (2018–2023); Sam Wilson (since 2027)
- Key people: Team roster
- Purpose: To defend Earth from imminent global threats. (Note: As seen on the "Protector Initiative" in Captain Marvel (2019))
- Affiliations: S.H.I.E.L.D., Stark Industries, Asgardians, Wakandans, Masters of the Mystic Arts, Guardians of the Galaxy, Thunderbolts, Fantastic Four, Talokanil, X-Men
- Enemies: Loki Laufeyson, Chitauri, Hydra, Ultron, Crossbones, Thaddeus Ross, Helmut Zemo, Children of Thanos, Thanos, Doctor Doom

The Avengers are a team of superheroes and the protagonists of the Marvel Cinematic Universe (MCU) media franchise, based on the eponymous team from Marvel Comics created by Stan Lee and Jack Kirby in 1963. Founded by S.H.I.E.L.D. director Nick Fury, the team is a United States–based organization composed primarily of superpowered and gifted individuals, described as "Earth's Mightiest Heroes", who are committed to the world's protection from a variety of threats.

The Avengers are depicted as operating in the state of New York: originally from the Avengers Tower in Midtown Manhattan and subsequently in the Avengers Compound in Upstate New York. Arranged as an ensemble of core MCU characters originally consisting of Tony Stark / Iron Man, Steve Rogers / Captain America, Thor Odinson, Bruce Banner / Hulk, Natasha Romanoff / Black Widow, and Clint Barton / Hawkeye, it later expands to include 16 total members.

Regarded as an important part of the franchise, they are central to the MCU's first 23 films, collectively known as the Infinity Saga. Avengers teams from alternate universes were depicted in subsequent MCU properties across the Multiverse Saga, including appearances in the Disney+ animated series What If...? (2021–2024) and Doctor Strange in the Multiverse of Madness (2022). A new incarnation of the Avengers is set to return in Avengers: Doomsday (2026) and Avengers: Secret Wars (2027). Both films will be part of the MCU's Phase Six, concluding the Multiverse Saga.

Following the formation of Marvel Studios as an independent film studio by Avi Arad, the head of Marvel's film division, producer Kevin Feige envisioned creating a shared cinematic universe to introduce the Avengers, similar to Stan Lee and Jack Kirby's comic books in the 1960s. Once Feige became studio chief in 2007 and formed his creative team, his strategy involved creating individual films for each major character in Phase One, beginning with Iron Man (2008) and concluding with The Avengers (2012). Casting for the original six members occurred from 2006 to 2010, beginning with Robert Downey Jr. as Iron Man and concluding with Mark Ruffalo replacing Edward Norton as the Hulk by 2010. Successive MCU installments introduced new members, with actors from other MCU films reprising their roles. Following the financial and critical success of The Avengers, a sequel, Avengers: Age of Ultron (2015), was subsequently developed, with Aaron Taylor-Johnson and Elizabeth Olsen joining as Pietro and Wanda Maximoff, respectively. Captain America: Civil War (2016) was influenced by the "Civil War" comic storyline, depicting the breakup of the Avengers and introducing Tom Holland as Peter Parker / Spider-Man. Avengers: Infinity War (2018) and Avengers: Endgame (2019) concluded the Infinity Saga and depicted their disbandment. The film Captain America: Brave New World (2025) depicts the team restarting under the leadership of Anthony Mackie's Sam Wilson / Captain America, while the film Thunderbolts* (2025) sees members of the Thunderbolts team form a separate faction dubbed the "New Avengers".

The four Avengers films are currently the third highest-grossing superhero franchise and the fifth highest-grossing film franchise of all time, grossing more than US$7.8 billion. The Avengers have received praise as a group from critics, particularly for their dynamic together, with Endgame receiving praise from critics as a conclusion for that iteration of the team. Due to their successful introduction, other film studios decided to create their own shared superhero universes, notably DC Entertainment and Warner Bros. Pictures, which announced plans to release a film for the Justice League. Avengers Campus, a series of attractions at various Disney Parks, opened in June 2021 at Disney California Adventure, while an immersive family dining experience called "Avengers: Quantum Encounter" debuted at the Worlds of Marvel restaurant in the Disney Wish cruise ship in July 2022.

== Fictional team biography ==
The Avengers' story in the MCU takes place in the Earth-616 universe. (Note: The main MCU universe was established to be Earth-616 in Doctor Strange in the Multiverse of Madness (2022).) The fictional biography below includes events that happened to the team from more than one Earth-616 timeline, as well as events that occurred in alternate universes.

=== The Avengers Initiative ===
In 1995, S.H.I.E.L.D. director Nick Fury creates the Avengers Initiative, envisioning it as a group of heroes working to respond to planetary threats, following the appearance of Carol Danvers and naming it after her U.S. Air Force callsign, "Avenger". Years later, Fury assesses various individuals for it, including Tony Stark and Steve Rogers. Stark's membership is declined after a negative report by S.H.I.E.L.D. agent Natasha Romanoff. The World Security Council wanted Emil Blonsky to join, but rejected it after Stark deters Thaddeus Ross from the idea, hiring Bruce Banner instead.

=== The first assembly ===
The founding Avengers assembling in what is considered one of the pivotal moments of the MCU. (L to R: Scarlett Johansson as Natasha Romanoff / Black Widow, Chris Hemsworth as Thor, Chris Evans as Steve Rogers / Captain America, Jeremy Renner as Clint Barton / Hawkeye, Robert Downey Jr. as Tony Stark / Iron Man, and Mark Ruffalo as Bruce Banner / The Hulk).

In 2012, the Asgardian Loki teleports to the Joint Dark Energy Mission Facility on Earth, where he steals the Tesseract and brainwashes Clint Barton and Dr. Erik Selvig using his scepter. Subsequently, Fury recruits Stark and Banner to locate the Tesseract. Rogers, Romanoff, and Stark apprehend Loki, but are disrupted by Thor's arrival. This leads to confrontations between the group, exacerbated by the revelation that S.H.I.E.L.D. is using the Tesseract to create weapons of mass destruction. Barton attacks the Helicarrier, causing Banner to transform into the Hulk and cause damage. After Loki kills S.H.I.E.L.D. agent Phil Coulson, the team unites to avenge him, with Romanoff freeing Barton from the scepter's control. Rogers then recruits Barton to the team as a new member. The Avengers confront Loki, who opens a wormhole using the Tesseract and begins an invasion with his Chitauri army, starting a battle. Stark introduces the team to Loki by referring to them as "Earth's Mightiest Heroes". Eventually, the World Security Council launches a nuclear missile towards Manhattan, but Stark intercepts and flies it through the wormhole, destroying the Chitauri mother ship and stopping the invasion. Romanoff closes the portal with the scepter and the team apprehends Loki, who is taken back to Asgard.

=== Fighting Hydra and Ultron ===
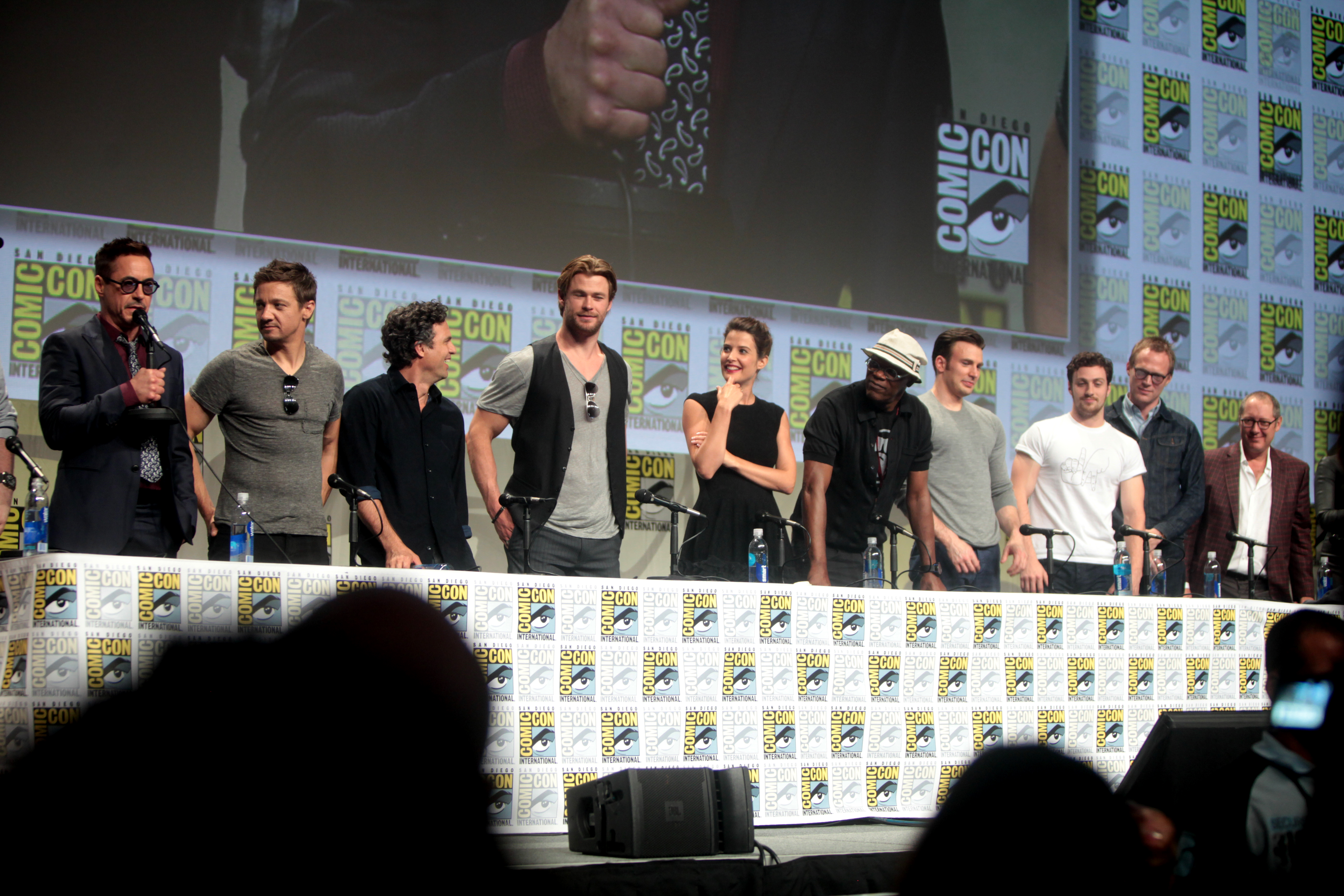
The cast of Avengers: Age of Ultron at the 2014 San Diego Comic-Con

Three years after the Battle of New York, Hydra uses Loki's scepter following their infiltration of S.H.I.E.L.D. The Avengers locate it in Sokovia, where they recover it and encounter twin superhuman Hydra test subjects, Wanda and Pietro Maximoff. Barton is wounded and Rogers captures Hydra leader Wolfgang von Strucker while Stark retrieves the scepter, despite being subjected to hallucinations by Wanda's telepathy. Stark and Banner unilaterally decide to use the scepter to create the Ultron Program, a sentient artificial intelligence (AI) peacekeeping force. However, Ultron resolves to eradicate humanity.

In Africa, the Avengers fight Ultron, now allied with the Maximoffs. Wanda induces telekinetic hallucinations, triggering Banner's transformation into the Hulk before Barton stops her, while Stark stops Hulk's rampage with his Hulkbuster armor. After reconvening at Barton's farmhouse, Rogers, Barton, and Romanoff retrieve a new vibranium body created by Ultron. Stark and Banner use it to create Vision, a sentient and benevolent being powered from the Stark's J.A.R.V.I.S. program, Mjolnir, and the Mind Stone. Ultron tries to use Sokovia as a meteor to cause an extinction event. The Avengers, joined by James Rhodes and the Maximoffs, defeat Ultron's sentries and evacuate civilians. Pietro sacrifices himself to save Barton, while Stark and Thor destroy Sokovia, and Vision fully terminates Ultron to avert the event. In the aftermath, Stark and Barton retire, Banner disappears, and Thor decides to find the Infinity Stones, while Rhodes, Sam Wilson, Wanda, and the Vision join the team. The Avengers relocate their primary headquarters to the Avengers Compound in Upstate New York.

=== Civil War ===
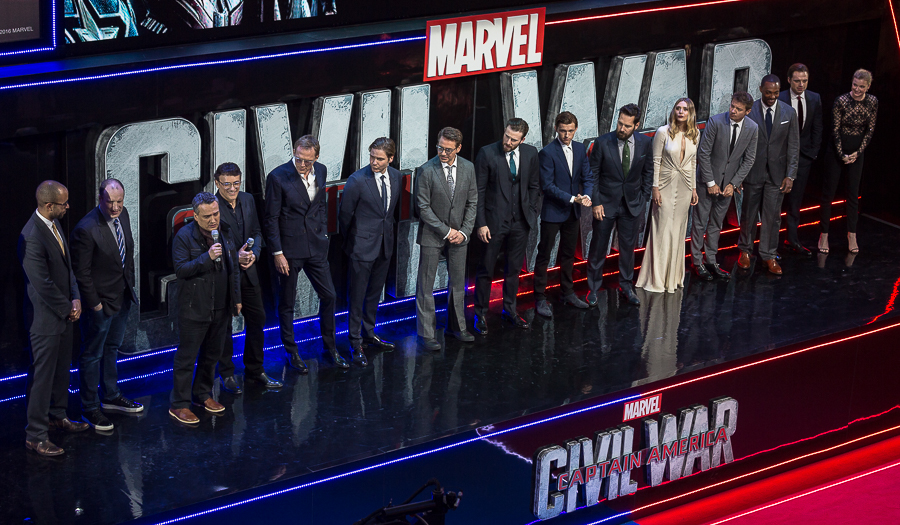
The cast of Captain America: Civil War, joined by Kevin Feige, the directing Russo brothers and producer Nate Moore at the London premiere

Months after the Battle of Sokovia, the Avengers' new facility becomes targeted in a heist, with a skirmish between Wilson and Scott Lang. In 2016, Rogers, Romanoff, Maximoff, and Wilson defend a research lab in Lagos from Brock Rumlow. They successfully stop Rumlow and his crew of mercenaries, but Maximoff's usage of telekinesis to try to save civilians kills Wakandan diplomats. Thus, United States Secretary of State Thaddeus Ross presents the Sokovia Accords, United Nations (U.N.) legislation intended to regulate superhumans' activities. The Avengers are divided: Stark, Rhodes, Vision, and Romanoff support it, while Rogers and Wilson object due to fears of authoritarianism.

After Bucky Barnes is accused of killing Wakandan King T'Chaka, Rogers and Wilson protect him from an arrest warrant, causing them to clash with Stark, Rhodes, Romanoff, and T'Challa, son of T'Chaka who was killed in Lagos. After Barnes is detained, Helmut Zemo activates Barnes' Winter Soldier persona using the Winter Soldier Book, although Barnes later recovers and reveals Zemo's interest in the Winter Soldier Program. To aid them, Wilson and Rogers recruit Lang and Barton, then take Maximoff out of confinement at the Avengers Compound. The divided Avengers meet and fight at the Leipzig/Halle Airport; Rogers, Wilson, Barton, Maximoff, Barnes and Lang clash with Stark, Rhodes, Romanoff, Vision, T'Challa and new recruit Peter Parker.

Rogers and Barnes escape with Romanoff's help, traveling to the Hydra Siberian Facility to stop Zemo from reactivating the Winter Soldier Program. Their teammates are imprisoned in the Raft and Rhodes' legs are paralyzed after accidentally being struck by Vision's blast. Stark joins Rogers and Barnes after realizing Barnes' innocence, but fights them after Zemo reveals Barnes' assassination of Stark's parents. In the fight, Rogers disables Stark's armor and Barnes' cybernetic arm is destroyed. Rogers then abandons his shield. Meanwhile, T'Challa apprehends Zemo, realizing him to be T'Chaka's killer. Rogers later frees his teammates from the Raft, becoming fugitives. Barton and Lang agree to be under house arrest to be with their families. Although officially reduced to just Stark, Vision, and Rhodes, the Avengers continue operating. Stark offers to hire Parker after he defeats Adrian Toomes. However, Parker declines, choosing to remain as Spider-Man, but promises to assist the Avengers if needed. In 2018, Wade Wilson / Deadpool travels from his universe, Earth-10005, to Earth-616 / the "Sacred Timeline" hoping to join the Avengers and give his life added meaning. He is interviewed by Happy Hogan, who rejects him, and returns to his own universe.

=== The Blip ===
In 2018, the Avengers come into conflict with Thanos and his children, who seek the six Infinity Stones to erase half of the universe's life. Thanos hijacks a spaceship containing Asgardian refugees, killing Loki and subduing Thor. Thanos defeats Hulk, who is transported to Earth by Heimdall to inform Stephen Strange, the keeper of the Time Stone, of Thanos' arrival. Banner, Strange, and Wong, joined by Stark and Parker, confront two of his children in Greenwich Village. With Banner unable to transform to aid in the fight, Strange is captured and taken to their spaceship, while Banner warns Rogers of Thanos' intention to acquire Vision's Mind Stone. Stark and Parker pursue Strange and board the spaceship, where Stark officially anoints Parker as an Avenger. They go to Titan to confront Thanos, allying with the Guardians of the Galaxy along the way. The two teams temporarily restrain Thanos in an ensuing battle to take his Infinity Gauntlet off, now with four Stones. However, Peter Quill hits Thanos after learning he killed Gamora, freeing and allowing Thanos to incapacitate the group. With Thanos preparing to kill Stark, Strange surrenders the Time Stone to save his life.

Meanwhile, Maximoff and Vision, now in a relationship and hiding out in Edinburgh, are ambushed by two more of Thanos' children, resulting in Vision getting wounded. Rogers, Romanoff, and Wilson arrive and help. Returning to the Avengers Compound, they meet Rhodes and Banner to discuss Thanos. Vision proposes to be destroyed to prevent Thanos from acquiring the Mind Stone, but Maximoff refuses and the team travels to Wakanda, where Shuri begins an operation to safely remove the Stone. The Wakandan army, their allies, and Barnes aid the Avengers to repel an invasion by Thanos' children. Thor arrives on the battlefield alongside Rocket and Groot through the Bifrost after forging his new Stormbreaker axe on Nidavellir. Shuri is ambushed, stopping the operation, but the Avengers eventually kill Thanos' children. When Thanos arrives, the Avengers delay him while Maximoff kills Vision to destroy the Mind Stone. Maximoff is successful, but Thanos uses the Time Stone to undo her actions and retrieve the Stone, killing Vision again. With a full Gauntlet, Thanos initiates the Blip. Wilson, Barnes, Maximoff, Strange, Parker, T'Challa, Groot, Quill, Drax, and Mantis are blipped, leaving Stark and Nebula stranded on Titan while Thanos escapes. Fury and Maria Hill are blipped as they try to find the Avengers, but Fury manages to contact Danvers. Barton's family also are blipped, causing him to become the vengeful vigilante Ronin and murder criminals. Lang gets trapped in the Quantum Realm while harvesting energy, as Hank Pym, Hope, and Janet van Dyne get blipped prior to extracting him.

=== Reversing the Blip ===
The Avengers, led by Chris Evans as Captain America, assembling in the battle at the Avengers Compound. The battle sequence was praised by /Film as an improvement from Avengers: Infinity War, while scenes from the sequence were positively received by cinematic audiences.

Three weeks later, the Avengers reunite after Stark and Nebula are rescued by Danvers. The Avengers find Thanos' location, where Rogers, Romanoff, Banner, Thor, Danvers, Rhodes, Rocket, and Nebula ambush him. Thanos reveals he destroyed the Stones, prompting Thor to decapitate him.

By 2023, Romanoff becomes the leader of the Avengers, officially recruiting Danvers, Rocket, and Nebula to the team. The Avengers collaborate with Okoye to mitigate the Blip's damage. Rogers becomes a grief counselor, Stark lives with his wife Pepper Potts and daughter Morgan, Thor becomes an overweight alcoholic afflicted with depression, while Banner integrates his intelligence within the Hulk's body. Lang escapes the Quantum Realm and visits Rogers and Romanoff at the Compound, proposing to use the Quantum Realm for time travel to undo the Blip. They visit Stark and Banner to discuss it, but Stark rejects it while Banner's tests with Pym's Quantum Tunnel fail. Stark eventually helps them, with the group using Pym Particles for time traveling. Banner and Rocket travel to New Asgard, Norway, to recruit Thor, while Romanoff recruits Barton in Tokyo. They all reconvene and form a plan to conduct a time-traveling operation to retrieve each Stone from the best years and locations.

Banner, Rogers, Stark, and Lang travel to New York City in 2012: Banner gets the Time Stone from the Ancient One after revealing Strange's surrendering of it, Rogers finds the Mind Stone in Loki's scepter, while Stark and Lang fail to get the Space Stone, but Stark and Rogers get it by going back to Camp Leigh in 1970. Thor and Rocket retrieve the Reality Stone from Asgard in 2013, while Rhodes and Nebula retrieve the Power Stone from Morag in 2014. There, 2014-Thanos learns of the Blip and the Avengers' plan to undo it, so he kidnaps 2023-Nebula and replaces her with 2014-Nebula to sabotage the operation. Barton gets the Soul Stone after Romanoff sacrifices herself on Vormir.

Reuniting in 2023, the Avengers place the Stones into the newly made Nano Gauntlet. Then, Banner snaps with the gauntlet on, undoing the Blip. Meanwhile, 2014-Nebula transports 2014-Thanos, his warship, and 2014-Gamora to 2023, destroying the Avengers Compound. 2023-Nebula kills 2014-Nebula after failing to convince her to betray Thanos. Thanos overpowers Stark, Thor, and Rogers and directs his army to obtain the Stones, intent on creating a new "grateful" universe. Strange creates portals, allowing the restored Avengers and their allies to arrive to fight Thanos and his army. Maximoff overpowers Thanos and almost kills him, forcing him to call for his warship to fire missiles onto the ground. Danvers arrives and destroys the warship, but he knocks her out in a confrontation using the Power Stone and seizes the Nano Gauntlet. Stark confronts Thanos and steals the Stones from the Gauntlet with his armor, snapping his fingers to disintegrate Thanos and his army, but the radiation kills Stark. After the battle, Fury sends Skrulls to collect blood samples on the battlefield, including some of the Avengers, combining them into one concoction known as the Harvest.

=== Disbandment ===
The Avengers and their allies attend Stark's funeral at Stark's house. Afterwards, they disband. Rogers travels back into the Quantum Realm to return the Stones to their respective timelines and then travels back to his own timeline in the past to live with Peggy Carter. Rogers returns as an old man with a new shield and grants it and the title of Captain America to Wilson. Thor appoints Valkyrie as the new ruler of New Asgard and goes to space with the Guardians of the Galaxy. Maximoff goes to Florida and sees that Vision is in S.W.O.R.D. custody at their headquarters. She then travels to Westview, New Jersey and in her grief over the trauma she endured throughout her life, recently with the loss of Vision and her home, the Avengers Compound, creates a Hex trapping the town in a sitcom called WandaVision and creating twin boys and another Vision. She learns she is the mythical Scarlet Witch and embraces her powers as such. Vision is reactivated by S.W.O.R.D., through remnants of Maximoff's magic on a drone, and sports an all white appearance.

Wilson returns to help out in the United States Air Force. In 2024, with Barnes' reassurance, Wilson takes up the mantle of Captain America. He gives his Falcon wings and mantle to his Air Force friend, Joaquin Torres. Also in 2024, Banner and Danvers answer Wong's hologram call and meet Xu Shang-Chi. They discuss the origins of the ten rings and discover that the rings are acting as a beacon to something. Later that year, Banner aids his cousin Jennifer Walters after she receives his abilities following a blood cross-contamination in a car accident. Maximoff, having been in self-imposed isolation, becomes corrupted by the Darkhold and comes into conflict with Strange and Wong. However, she ultimately breaks out of the corruption and destroys the Darkhold Castle on Mount Wundagore, along with every Darkhold copy. Barton returns to live with his family at their farm in Iowa. In December 2024, Barton and his children go to New York City before Christmas to see a Broadway musical about Rogers' legacy. While there, he meets Kate Bishop and her golden retriever, Lucky. He takes her in as his protégé and they become Barton's extended family.

In 2025, the first annual "AvengerCon" is held at Camp Lehigh to honor the Avengers. Lang becomes a celebrity while spending time with his daughter and the Pym family, starts the Big Me Little Me podcast, and writes his bestselling memoir Look Out for the Little Guy. Banner travels to Sakaar to bring his son, Skaar, to Earth. In 2026, Lang, his daughter Cassie, Hope, Pym, and Janet are transported into the Quantum Realm where they encounter Kang the Conqueror, who forces Lang to help him escape. They successfully defeat Kang and return home. However, the Council of Kangs, overseeing the multiverse outside of space and time, notes that Earth-616's Avengers are becoming more aware of the multiverse and must be stopped.

=== Restarting ===
In 2027, Wilson is asked by the new President of the United States, Thaddeus Ross, to restart the Avengers. Wilson is initially reluctant to do so because of Ross's involvement in the Sokovia Accords, which not only caused the original team to be divided and disbanded but also partially led to the Blip, and any governing oversight of the team would cause interference with their duties. However, Wilson ultimately accepts his responsibilities as Captain America and acknowledges that the world needs the Avengers to return. He chooses Torres, the new Falcon, as his first recruit to join the new team. Later that year, Contessa Valentina Allegra de Fontaine, director of the Central Intelligence Agency (CIA), publicly rebrands the Thunderbolts team—consisting of Yelena Belova, John Walker / U.S. Agent, Ava Starr / Ghost, Alexei Shostakov / Red Guardian, and Barnes—as the New Avengers during a manipulated press conference, with Belova serving as the leader. Banner becomes a professor of quantum mechanics in New York and meets Parker. Fourteen months later, in 2028, Wilson sues the team for copyright infringement for the name "New Avengers" after reinstating the original team.

=== Alternate versions ===
Other versions of the Avengers are depicted within the context of the MCU multiverse, such as in Avengers: Endgame (2019) and the animated series What If...? (2021–2024).

==== Alternate 2012 timeline ====
In an alternate 2012, Rogers, Stark, Banner, Thor, Barton, and Romanoff assemble in the Battle of New York. After subduing Loki at Stark Tower, Thor puts a device over Loki's mouth after he mocks Rogers. Romanoff and Barton give the Scepter to Brock Rumlow and other agents. Stark and Thor take Loki on the elevator to the first floor, telling Banner he has to take the stairs as he would not fit. Rogers meets his Earth-616 counterpart and mistakes him for being Loki, inciting a duel, which ends with him hearing that Barnes is alive and getting knocked out by the Scepter. Stark and Thor are approached by Alexander Pierce on the first floor, who asks for Loki to be handed over, but Stark suffers a cardiac arrest, causing him to drop the briefcase, releasing the Tesseract. Thor uses Mjolnir to save him. Banner arrives angrily, unknowingly knocking into Earth-616 Stark on his way out of the building. Soon after, Thor turns around and is unable to find Loki.

==== What If...? season 1 (2021) ====
In an alternate 2011, a vengeful Hank Pym eliminates the Avengers' candidates: Stark, Thor, Barton, Banner, and Romanoff. After Pym is defeated, Loki proceeds to invade Earth. Meanwhile, Fury prepares to recreate the team after Rogers is discovered in the Arctic and Danvers responds to his call. Rogers, Danvers, and Fury later battle Loki and his Asgardian army aboard a Helicarrier. During the fight, the Watcher brings in a variant of Romanoff, and she incapacitates Loki with his scepter.

In an alternate 2018, a quantum virus is released, turning people into zombies. Rogers, Stark, T'Challa, Romanoff, and Barton respond to an outbreak in San Francisco and are infected as well. Banner and Parker survive, and with other allies, find Vision and Maximoff, with Vision taking care of an infected Maximoff. Vision sacrifices himself to provide the Mind Stone to find a cure, while Banner stays behind to stall Maximoff, allowing Parker, T'Challa, and Lang to escape to Wakanda, where an infected Thanos awaits with the other Infinity Stones.

In an alternate 2015, Ultron successfully implants himself into Vision's body and exterminates the Avengers, except for Barton and Romanoff. Years later, Ultron begins a campaign of destruction across the universe after obtaining the Infinity Stones, while Barton and Romanoff fight Ultron's sentries. They attempt to shut down Ultron and eventually prepare to upload an analog copy of Arnim Zola's consciousness into Ultron's hivemind, but Barton sacrifices himself in vain as the upload fails when Ultron enters the multiverse.

==== What If...? season 2 (2023) ====
In an alternate 1988, Howard Stark and Peggy Carter form a response team composed of Hank Pym, Bill Foster, T'Chaka, Wendy Lawson, and Bucky Barnes to subdue a young Peter Quill under Ego's influence. With Thor's help, the team successfully defeats Ego and frees Quill from his control, while Pym adopts Quill. As a fully-formed team, Pym, Foster, Lawson, T'Chaka, and Thor agree to continue working together.

In an alternate universe on Christmas Eve, Stark and Rogers dress up as Santa Claus and an elf, respectively, at a shopping mall, while Barton and Banner try to maintain crowds at an Avengers toy action store. Elsewhere, Romanoff intercepts a former HYDRA agent at a Christmas ballet. They gather together and arrive at the Avengers Tower for the annual Christmas party, but defend it from the Freak, until Darcy Lewis reveals he is Happy Hogan and that Justin Hammer infiltrated the Tower. As they prepare to party, Thor arrives outside late.

In an alternate 2012, the Avengers, composed of Carter, Stark, Thor, Romanoff, Barton, and the Wasp, subdue Loki's Chitauri invasion in New York. Captain Carter gets transported to 1602 in a new universe by the Scarlet Witch, and agrees to help her and Sir Nicholas Fury after learning about an impending incursion. Later, a tear opens up, with Carter saving Loki but not Queen Hela, resulting in her being hunted down by Sir Harold "Happy" Hogan and the Royal Yellowjackets under the new King Thor's orders. Carter locates Tony Stark to get his help in retrieving Thor's Scepter. She finds Loki's carriage and meets Rogers Hood, Bucky Barnes, and Scott Lang. After Carter frees Bruce Banner, everyone meets with Stark, who shows them the device he created to help. They all disguise themselves to enter Thor's courtroom and a fight occurs. Carter takes the Scepter and uses the Time Stone inside Stark's device, exposing a time-displaced Rogers, who inadvertently created the temporal anomaly during a battle with Thanos. She is forced to say goodbye to him and sends him back to his universe, averting the incursion.

==== What If...? season 3 (2024) ====
In an alternate 2014, after Bruce Banner attempted to cure himself from his Hulk condition by bombarding himself with Gamma radiation and accidentally created a monstrous creature known as the "Apex", the Avengers-Steve Rogers, Tony Stark, Natasha Romanoff, Thor, Clint Barton-attempted to battle the Apex and its army with ginormous mechs, but were outnumbered and killed. The surviving heroes—consisting of Sam Wilson, Monica Rambeau, Bucky Barnes, Marc Spector, Alexei Shostakov, Melina Vostokoff, Shang-Chi and Nakia—eventually repel the monsters for the next ten years. In the present day, the new Avengers continue their struggle against the returning Apex and its army, while unlocking their mechs' capability to combine into a bigger and more powerful mech using the "Mighty Avenger Protocol" built by Banner.

In an alternate 2012, the original six Avengers were joined by Alexei Shostakov during the Battle of New York.

==== Other universes ====
A version of the Avengers existed on Earth-838 where Peggy Carter / Captain Carter became the first member. In an alternate 2018, the Avengers and Thanos are killed during the Battle of Wakanda when Glenn Talbot / Graviton, attempting to draw up enough gravitonium to help the Avengers defeat Thanos, accidentally causes the planet to explode. In several alternate universes, the Avengers were killed by Kang, who successfully conquered their respective universes.

== Team roster ==
=== Founding members ===
Character	Portrayed by	Joined in
Steve Rogers Captain America	Chris Evans	The Avengers
Tony Stark Iron Man	Robert Downey Jr.	The Avengers
Bruce Banner The Hulk	Mark Ruffalo	The Avengers
Thor Odinson	Chris Hemsworth	The Avengers
Natasha Romanoff Black Widow	Scarlett Johansson	The Avengers
Clint Barton Hawkeye	Jeremy Renner	The Avengers

=== Later members ===
Character	Portrayed by	Joined in
Wanda Maximoff	Elizabeth Olsen	Avengers: Age of Ultron
Vision	Paul Bettany	Avengers: Age of Ultron
James Rhodes War Machine	Don Cheadle	Avengers: Age of Ultron
Sam Wilson Falcon / Captain America	Anthony Mackie	Avengers: Age of Ultron
Peter Parker Spider-Man	Tom Holland	Avengers: Infinity War
Carol Danvers Captain Marvel	Brie Larson	Avengers: Endgame
Nebula	Karen Gillan	Avengers: Endgame
Rocket	Bradley Cooper (voice) Sean Gunn (motion capture)	Avengers: Endgame
Scott Lang Ant-Man	Paul Rudd	Avengers: Endgame
Joaquin Torres Falcon	Danny Ramirez	Captain America: Brave New World
Xu Shang-Chi	Simu Liu	Avengers: Doomsday

=== Other characters ===
Many characters have been affiliated with the Avengers in the Marvel Cinematic Universe:

- S.H.I.E.L.D. Director Nick Fury is the creator of the Avengers and assists them numerous times.
- S.H.I.E.L.D. assists the Avengers in the Battle of New York. S.H.I.E.L.D. agent Phil Coulson contributes to the Avengers' creation. Fury described him as being as much of an Avenger as the superheroes. Even after its collapse, agents like Maria Hill fight alongside the Avengers in the Battle of Sokovia.
- During the events of Age of Ultron, Pietro Maximoff, Erik Selvig and Helen Cho begin working for the Avengers.
- T'Challa / Black Panther and Bucky Barnes / Winter Soldier / White Wolf fight alongside the Avengers during the Avengers Civil War, the Battle of Wakanda, and the battle at the Avengers Compound.
- Individuals such as Okoye, Ayo, Drax, Groot, Mantis, Peter Quill / Star-Lord, Dr. Stephen Strange, and Wong with the rest of the Wakandan army fight alongside the Avengers during the Infinity War and the battle at the Avengers Compound.
- M'Baku and Shuri / Black Panther fight alongside the Avengers during the Battle of Wakanda, the battle at the Avengers Compound, and in the battle against Doctor Doom.
- Individuals such as Howard the Duck, Korg, Kraglin Obfonteri, Miek, Pepper Potts, Valkyrie, Hope van Dyne / Wasp, Gamora, the Masters of the Mystic Arts, the Ravagers, and the rest of the Asgardian army fight alongside the Avengers in the battle at the Avengers Compound.
- Members of the Thunderbolts team form a separate faction dubbed the "New Avengers" consisting of Bucky Barnes, Yelena Belova / Black Widow, Bob Reynolds / Sentry, Alexei Shostakov / Red Guardian, Ava Starr / Ghost, and John Walker / U.S. Agent. This faction will team up with the Avengers in the battle against Doctor Doom.
- Loki Laufeyson, Namor and the Talokanil, Reed Richards / Mister Fantastic, Sue Storm / Invisible Woman, Johnny Storm / Human Torch, Ben Grimm / The Thing, and H.E.R.B.I.E. of the Fantastic Four of Earth-828, and Charles Xavier / Professor X, Erik Lehnsherr / Magneto, Scott Summers / Cyclops, Raven Darkhölme / Mystique, Hank McCoy / Beast, Kurt Wagner / Nightcrawler, and Remy LeBeau / Gambit of the X-Men of Earth-10005 will fight alongside the Avengers against Doctor Doom.

== Concept and creation ==
=== Initial castings ===
Samuel L. Jackson makes his debut in a cameo appearance as Nick Fury, director of S.H.I.E.L.D., in a post-credits scene in Iron Man. Jackson's face was previously used as the model for the Ultimate Marvel imprint version of Nick Fury. Jackson confirmed that he had been in discussions to reprise the role of Fury from Iron Man's post-credits scene in the film's sequel, but that contract disputes were making a deal difficult. Jackson stated, "There was a huge kind of negotiation that broke down. I don't know. Maybe I won't be Nick Fury". In February 2009, Jackson and Marvel came to terms, and he was signed to play the character in up to nine films.

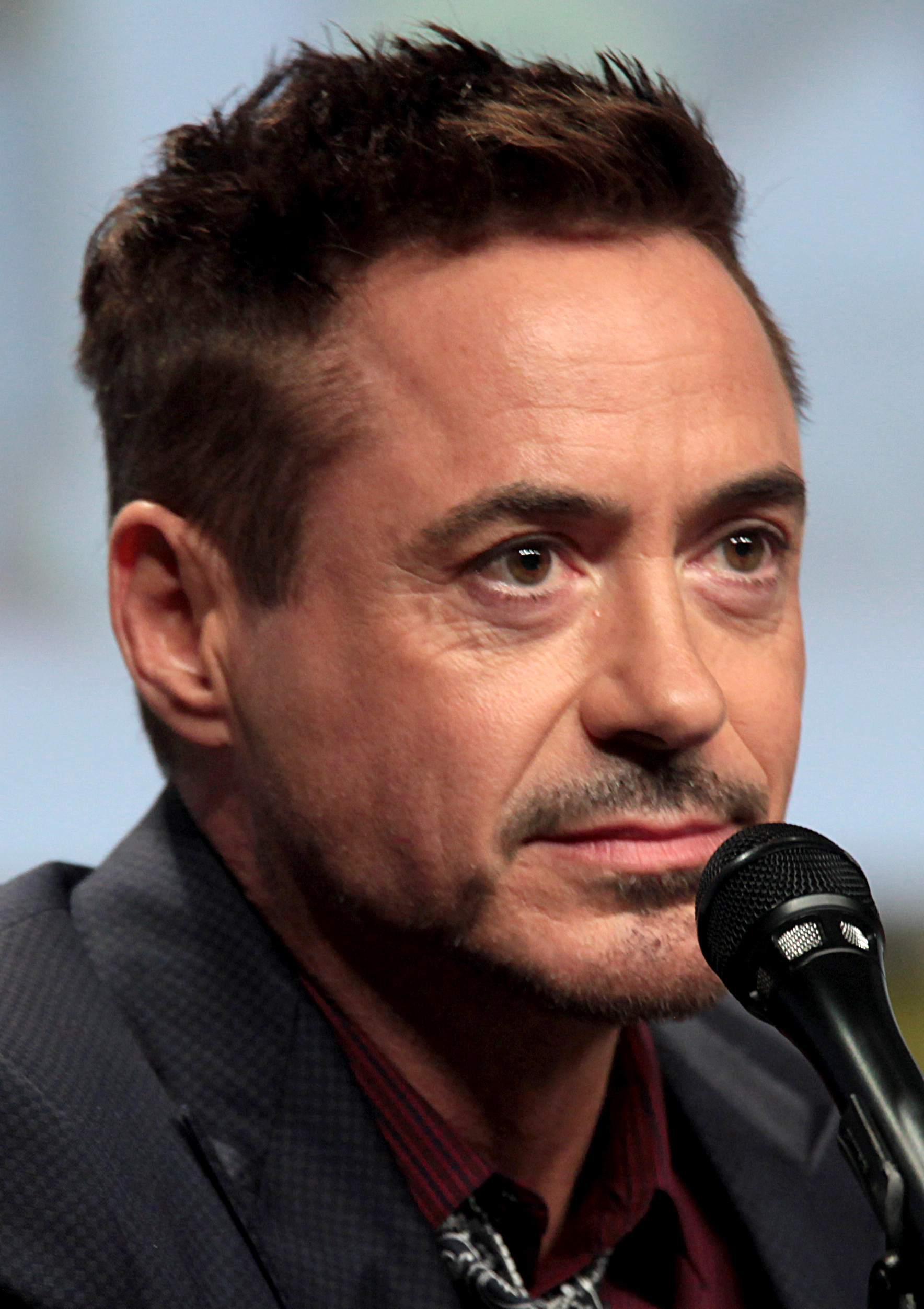
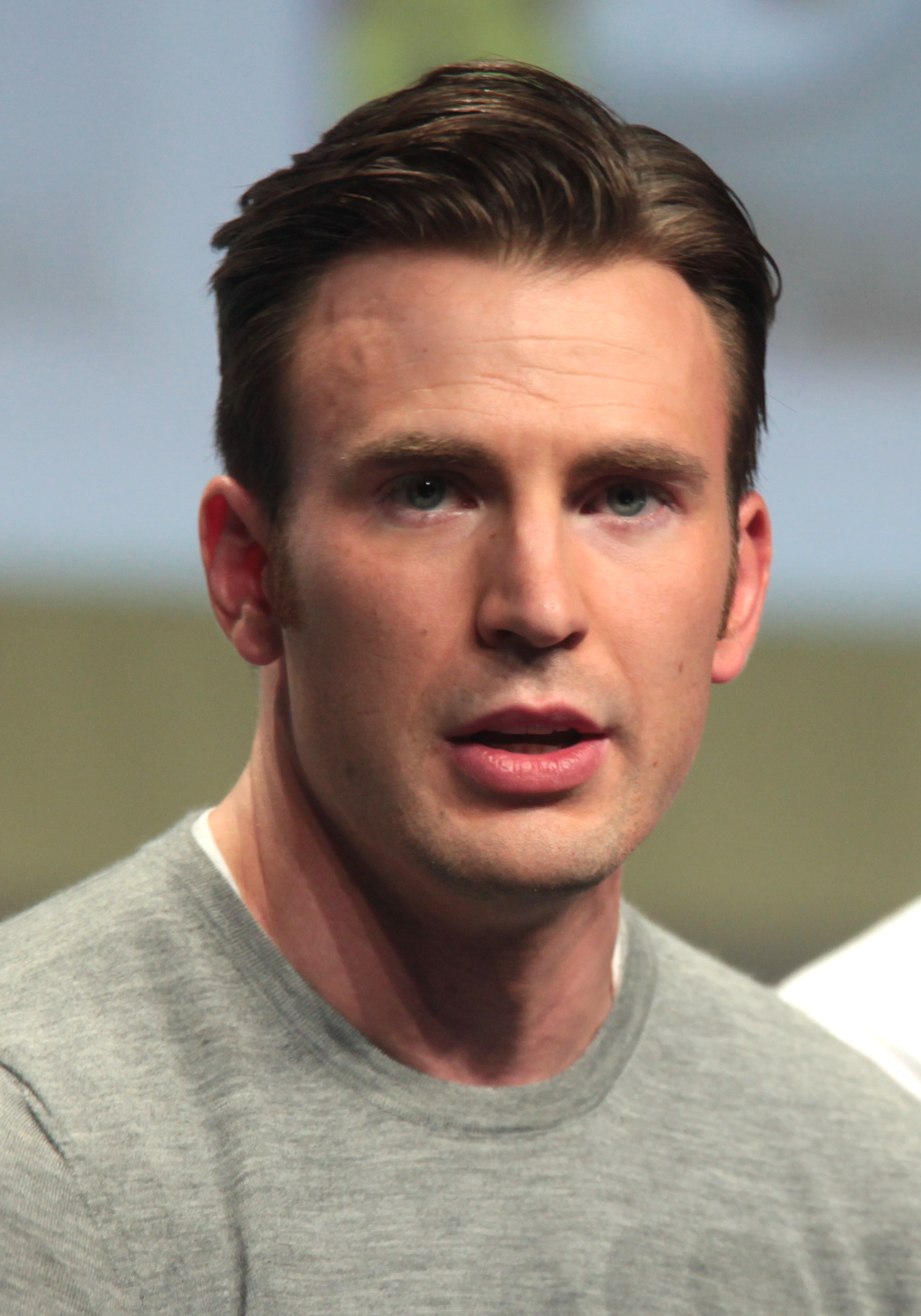
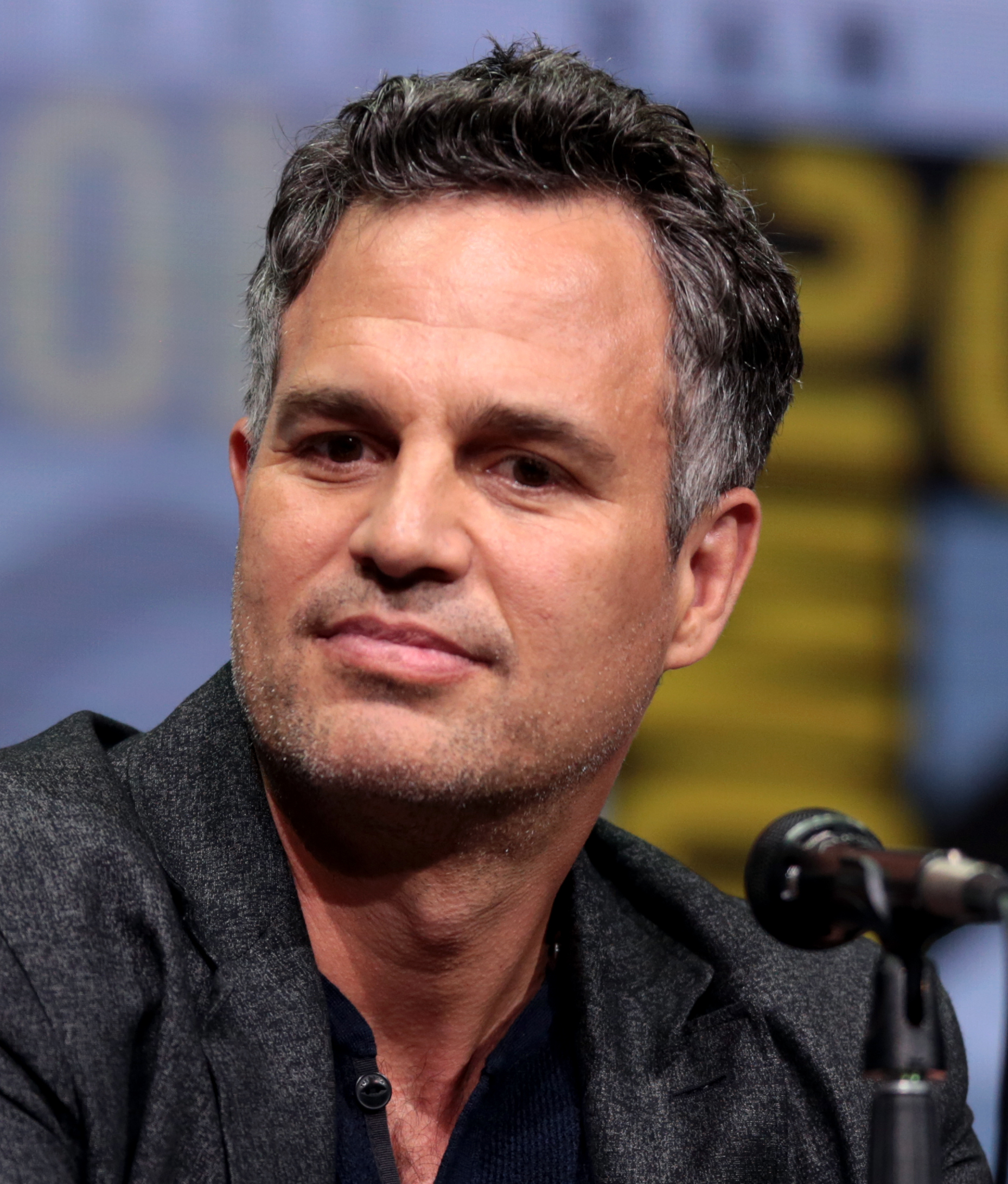
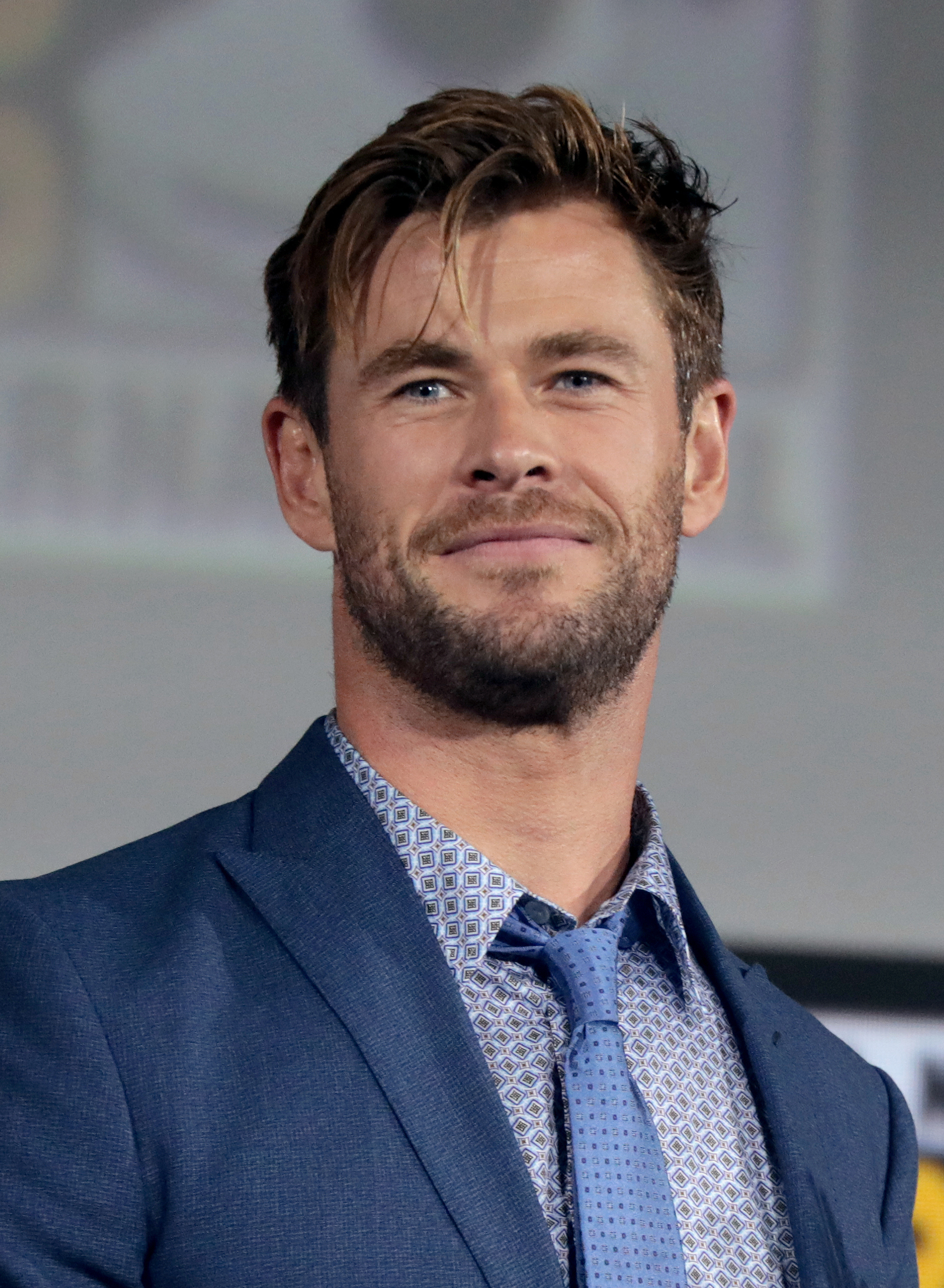
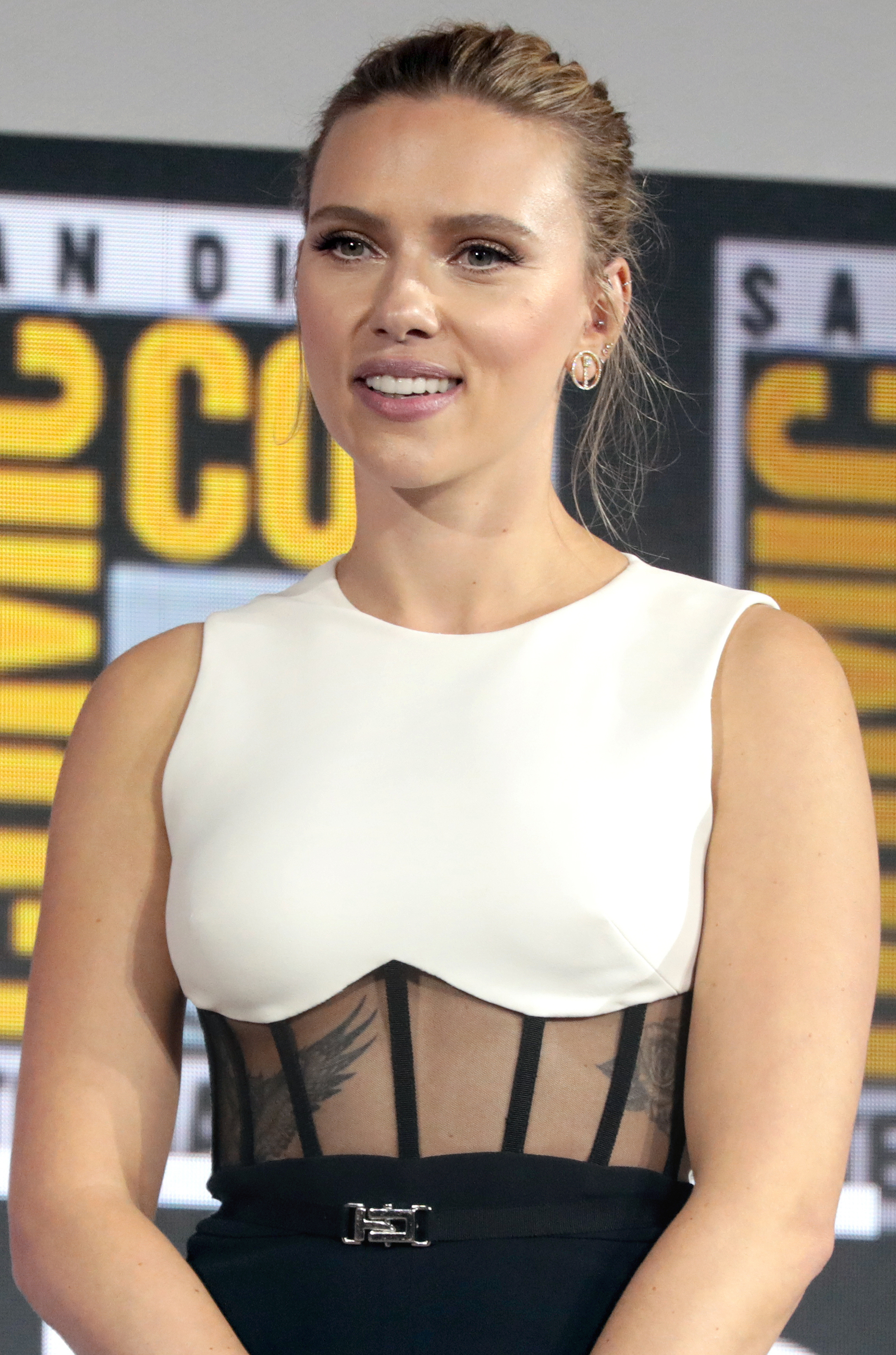
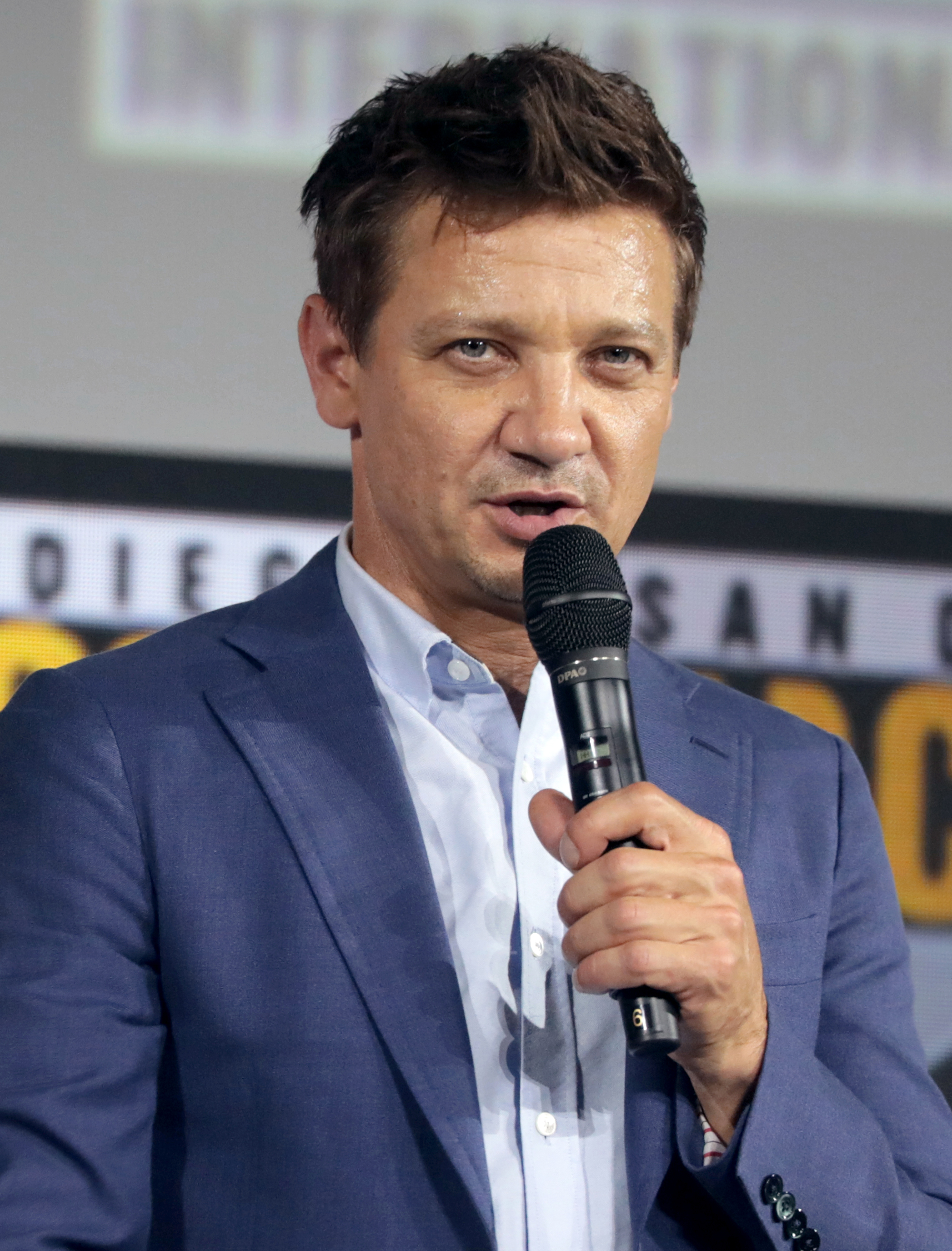
(top, L to R) Robert Downey Jr., Chris Evans, Mark Ruffalo, (bottom, L to R) Chris Hemsworth, Scarlett Johansson, and Jeremy Renner portray the first six Avengers in the MCU and play a central role in the films.

Director Jon Favreau planned to cast a newcomer in the title role in Iron Man (2008), as "those movies don't require an expensive star; Iron Man's the star, the superhero is the star. The success of X-Men (2000) and Spider-Man (2002) without being star-driven pieces reassures [executives] that the film does have an upside commercially". However, before the screenplay was prepared, he had approached Sam Rockwell to play the part. Rockwell had interest, but Favreau changed his decision after the screen test of Robert Downey Jr. In September 2006, Downey was cast in the role. Favreau chose Downey, a fan of the comic, because he felt the actor's past made him an appropriate choice for the part, explaining "The best and worst moments of Robert's life have been in the public eye. He had to find an inner balance to overcome obstacles that went far beyond his career. That's Tony Stark". Favreau faced opposition from Marvel in casting Downey, but advocated for his casting, saying that "It was my job as a director to show that it was the best choice creatively. Downey earned $500,000 for the role. Marvel entered into early talks with Emily Blunt to play Natasha Romanoff / Black Widow, though she was unable to take the role due to a previous commitment to star in Gulliver's Travels (2010). In February 2009, Scarlett Johansson signed on for the role. Her deal included options for multiple films, including potentially The Avengers. Prior to her casting, Johansson had also researched other Marvel characters she could play, including the Blonde Phantom and the Wasp.

In October 2008, Daniel Craig was offered the role of Thor, but ultimately turned it down, citing his commitments to the James Bond franchise. In February 2009, a casting call went out looking for actors with certain physical attributes to audition for the role of Thor. That May, Chris Hemsworth was in negotiations to portray the title role after a back-and-forth process in which he was refused early on, then given a second chance to read for the part. Hemsworth's brother, Liam, also auditioned, but was rejected by Marvel Studios head Kevin Feige. That month, Tom Hiddleston was cast as Loki, the brother of Thor, and later the main villain of The Avengers. He originally auditioned for the role of Thor. Kevin McKidd was also considered for the role. The casting process for The Avengers continued into much of 2010, with the addition of Jeremy Renner.

In March 2010, it was reported that Chris Evans was cast as Steve Rogers / Captain America. Ryan Phillippe and John Krasinski were also considered for the role. In April 2010, Sebastian Stan, who had been mentioned in media accounts as a possibility for the title role, was cast as Barnes. Mark Ruffalo was cast as Bruce Banner / Hulk by July 2010 to replace Edward Norton, who played the role in The Incredible Hulk. "Our decision is definitely not one based on monetary factors, but instead rooted in the need for an actor who embodies the creativity and collaborative spirit of our other talented cast members" stated Feige. In response, Norton's agent Brian Swardstrom decried Feige's statement, calling it "purposefully misleading" and an "inappropriate attempt to paint our client in a negative light". In October 2014, Norton claimed it was his own decision never to play Hulk again because he "wanted more diversity" with his career, and did not want to be associated with only one character.

=== Background and development ===
Films of Phase One
Film	U.S. release date	Director	Screenwriter(s)	Producer(s)	Status
The Avengers	May 4, 2012	Joss Whedon	Joss Whedon	Kevin Feige	Released
Avengers: Age of Ultron	May 1, 2015	Joss Whedon	Joss Whedon	Kevin Feige	Released
Avengers: Infinity War	April 27, 2018	Anthony and Joe Russo	Christopher Markus and Stephen McFeely	Kevin Feige	Released
Avengers: Endgame	April 26, 2019	Anthony and Joe Russo	Christopher Markus and Stephen McFeely	Kevin Feige	Released
Avengers: Doomsday	December 18, 2026	Anthony and Joe Russo	Michael Waldron, Stephen McFeely and Chris McKenna & Erik Sommers	Kevin Feige	Post-production
Avengers: Secret Wars	December 17, 2027	Anthony and Joe Russo	Michael Waldron, Stephen McFeely and Chris McKenna & Erik Sommers	Kevin Feige	Pre-production

==== The Avengers ====
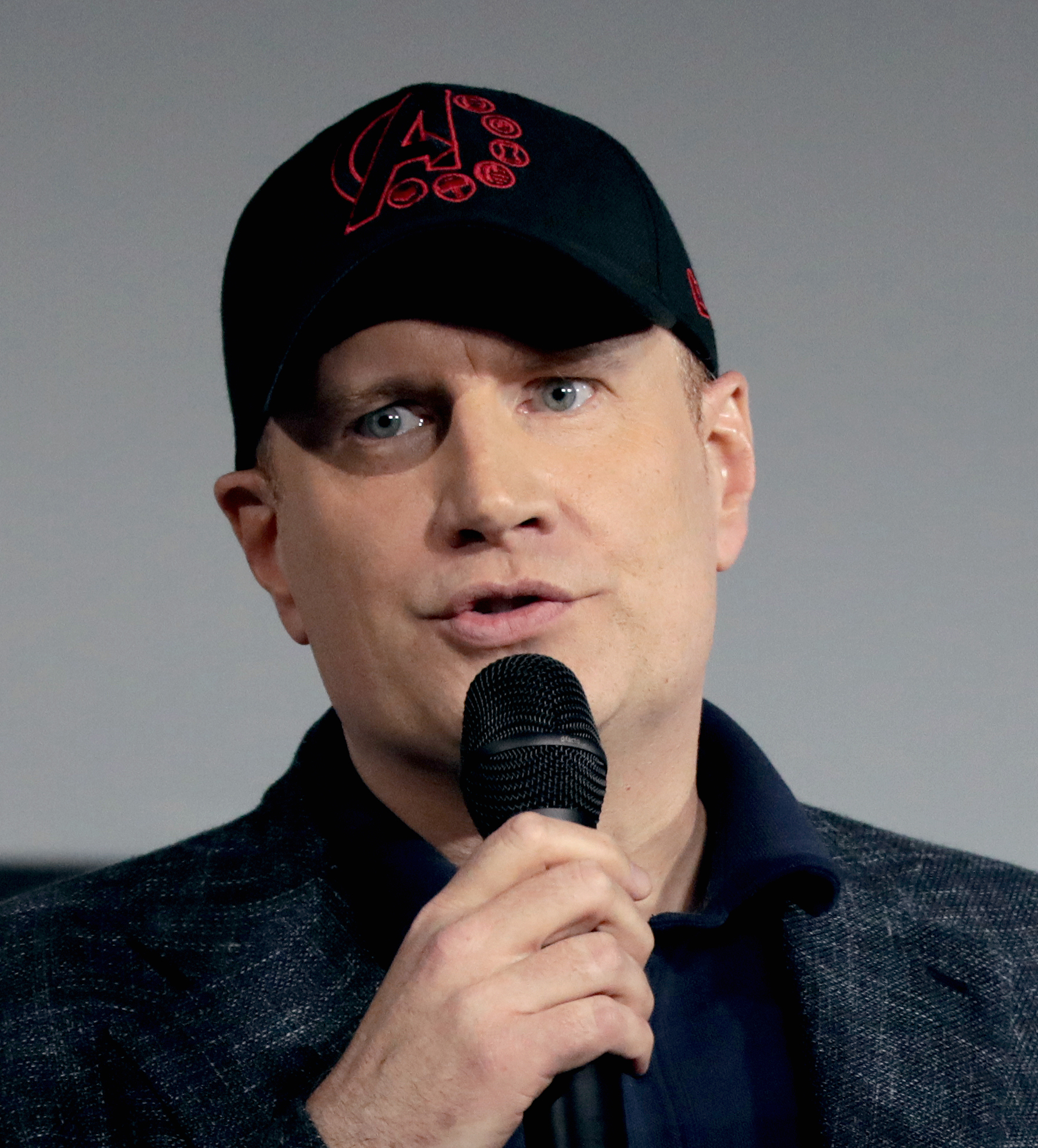
Kevin Feige helped conceive the concept of the Avengers in one shared universe.

In the mid-2000s, Feige realized that Marvel still owned the rights to the core members of the Avengers. Feige, a self-professed "fanboy", envisioned creating a shared universe just as creators Stan Lee and Jack Kirby had done with their comic books in the early 1960s. Ideas for a film based on the Avengers began in 2003, with Avi Arad, the CEO of Marvel Studios, first announcing plans to develop the film in April 2005. This followed Marvel Enterprises declaring independence by allying with Merrill Lynch to produce a slate of films that would be distributed by Paramount Pictures. Marvel discussed their plans in a brief presentation to Wall Street analysts; the studio intended to release films for each main character to establish their identities and familiarize audiences with them before a crossover film. Screenwriter Zak Penn, who wrote The Incredible Hulk (2008), which introduced Bruce Banner / Hulk, became attached to the film in 2006 and was hired by Marvel Studios to write The Avengers in June 2007. In the wake of the 2007–2008 Writers Guild of America strike, Marvel negotiated with the Writers Guild of America to ensure that it could create films based on its comic book counterparts, including Captain America, Ant-Man and the Avengers. After the successful release of Iron Man in May, which introduced Tony Stark / Iron Man, the company set a July 2011 release date for The Avengers. In September 2008, Marvel Studios reached an agreement with Paramount—an extension of a previous partnership—which gave the company distribution rights for five future Marvel films.

In October 2008, two major prospects occurred for Marvel Studios: Favreau was brought in as an executive producer for the film, and the company signed a long-term lease with Raleigh Studios to produce three additional big-budget films alongside The Avengers at their Manhattan Beach, California complex. The films were Iron Man 2 (2010), introducing Romanoff, Thor introducing Thor and a cameo appearance of Barton, and Captain America: The First Avenger (2011), introducing Rogers. Favreau stated that he would not direct the film, but would "definitely have input and a say". Favreau expressed concerns about combining characters such as Iron Man and Thor, noting Iron Man's character was based around technology, while the inclusion of Thor would require the introduction of supernatural elements, which he said would require "a lot of thoughtfulness to make that all work and not blow the reality that we've created". In March 2009, Marvel announced that the film's release date had been pushed back to May 4, 2012, almost a full year later.

In July 2009, Penn talked about the crossover process, desiring to "kind of shuttle between the different movies" while emulating the structure of comic books to ensure the films were connected. He also wanted to use animatics wherever possible to help visualize the film and used the same board so that the team was "working off the same visual ideas". At first, Penn tried to reduce Thor's role in the script because he had doubts about the character's ability to succeed on film, but changed his mind once Hemsworth was cast. The film had always intended to use Loki as its villain, but Penn noted that early discussion had considered using Red Skull.

In January 2010, Feige was asked if it would be difficult to meld the fantasy of Thor with the high-tech science fiction in Iron Man and The Avengers. He rejected the notion and said the creative team would hew closer to the interpretation of Thor by comic book writers Kirby, Lee, Walt Simonson, and J. Michael Straczynski, rather than focus on Thor as depicted in Norse mythology, while additionally affirming the Thor film would help familiarize audiences with the character. In March, it was reported that Penn had completed the first draft of the script, and that Marvel editor-in-chief Joe Quesada and Avengers comic-book writer Brian Michael Bendis had received copies. In July, Joss Whedon signed on to direct and replace Penn as the film's writer. On his desire to take on the film, he explained that the core of the movie was about "finding yourself from community" and the togetherness derived from a group that ultimately doesn't belong together.

When Whedon received Penn's draft, he told Feige he felt the studio did not "have anything" and they should "pretend this draft never happened". Part of Whedon's issue was the lack of character connections in Penn's draft, which necessitated Whedon to begin "at square one". Whedon went on to write a five-page treatment of his plan for the film, and created the tagline "Avengers: Some Assembly Required", a humorous play on the "Avengers Assemble" slogan from the comic books. Marvel quickly began working to hire Whedon to write and direct, only mandating that Loki be the antagonist, a battle featuring the Avengers and villains take place, and the film to be completed prior to its May 2012 release. Whedon said the script went through several "insane iterations of what might be", and he explained there was a point when it was not certain Johansson would star in the film, so he wrote pages featuring the Wasp, and wanted Zooey Deschanel to play the character. He also was "worried that one British character actor [Hiddleston] was not enough to take on Earth's mightiest heroes, and that we'd feel like we were rooting for the overdog", thus choosing to add Ezekiel Stane, Obadiah Stane's son, into a new draft. Once all of the actors were "locked in place the movie stayed on mission". Whedon noted that the characters used do not have the same issue, unlike the X-Men. He felt "these guys just don't belong together" before modeling their interactions based on the film The Dirty Dozen (1967). Whedon also referenced Dr. Strangelove (1964), The Abyss (1989), His Girl Friday (1940), and Black Hawk Down (2001). Whedon would ultimately share final screenplay credit with Penn, though Whedon noted he "fought" for sole credit and was "very upset about it". Penn felt the two "could have collaborated more, but that was not his choice. He wanted to do it his way, and I respect that".

==== Age of Ultron ====
In May 2012, after the successful release of the first Avengers film, Disney CEO Bob Iger announced a sequel was in development. Most of the film's cast members were under contract to potentially appear in the sequel; however, Robert Downey Jr. was not, as his four-picture deal with Marvel expired after Iron Man 3 (2013). By May 2013, Downey had entered negotiations to extend his contract with Marvel Studios and reprise his role as Iron Man in the film. A month later, Downey signed on to return for the then-untitled Avengers sequel, as well as a third Avengers film.

At the 2012 San Diego Comic-Con, Whedon was unsure about directing. However, in August 2012, Iger announced that Whedon would return to write and direct. Later in the month, Disney set a May 1, 2015, release date. At the 2013 San Diego Comic-Con, Whedon announced the film would be subtitled Age of Ultron. Despite the subtitle, the film is not based on the comic book miniseries Age of Ultron (2013). Feige explained that they simply liked the title but the plot was taken from various Avengers story arcs. At the Hollywood premiere of Iron Man 3, Whedon said that he had completed a draft of the script, started the storyboard process, and met with actors. Whedon included a "brother/sister act" from the comic books, later revealed to be Quicksilver and Scarlet Witch. His rationale for their inclusion was that "their powers are very visually interesting", with problems; those powers are superspeed, and spells and telekinesis, respectively, though cautioned he was not throwing in more characters for the sake of doing that. Whedon stated that the twins, who do not approve of the Avengers, allowed him to add more conflict, noting "the Avengers are like a world power, and not everybody's on board with the Avengers coming in and starting fights, even in the name of justice". As Marvel Studios shared the film rights to Quicksilver and Scarlet Witch with 20th Century Fox, they had to avoid contradicting elements from Fox's X-Men films, Whedon introduced the two characters into the MCU completely based on his terms for the first time, allowing him to connect their origin stories and avoid the concept of mutants. Whedon enjoyed the storytelling opportunities from introducing a character with telepathic powers, explaining "it meant we could spend a little time inside the Avengers' heads—either their past or their impressions of what's going on, or their fears, or all of the above". Whedon added that Ultron's origin would differ from the comics, with Hank Pym not being involved in Ultron's creation. Whedon disclosed that Edgar Wright was using the character first in his film Ant-Man (2015), then in development. He also thought that Ultron needed to be conceived through the Avengers and since they already had Tony Stark and Bruce Banner on the team; it would not make sense to bring in a third scientist.

Casting continued into August 2013, with the announcement that James Spader would play the villain of the film, Ultron. That November Marvel confirmed that Elizabeth Olsen and Aaron Taylor-Johnson would play the Scarlet Witch and Quicksilver, respectively. Taylor-Johnson had been in negotiations since as early as June, while Olsen's potential involvement was first reported in August. By the end of the year, Mark Ruffalo, Chris Evans, Samuel L. Jackson, Chris Hemsworth, Scarlett Johansson, Jeremy Renner, and Cobie Smulders were confirmed to be reprising their roles from the first film, and Don Cheadle, who portrayed James Rhodes in the Iron Man films, was joining. In the early months of 2014, Paul Bettany, who voiced J.A.R.V.I.S. in previous MCU films, was cast as the Vision. Whedon noted the differences between the characters, explaining that "They're very disparate characters. The joy of the Avengers is they really don't belong in the same room. It's not like the X-Men, who are all tortured by the same thing and have similar costumes".

Feige revealed that Captain Marvel, who headlined her own MCU film in 2019, appeared in an early draft of the screenplay, but was removed since the character was not yet cast, saying, "We didn't want to introduce her fully formed flying in a costume before you knew who she was or how she came to be". Whedon shot visual effects plates for Captain Marvel to fly into Avengers Headquarters at the end of the film; those shots were instead repurposed for Wanda Maximoff. Feige also revealed that an early draft had Hulk's Quinjet detected near Saturn at the end of the film, but it was decided to keep it Earth-based and leave his fate ambiguous to dispel rumors that a film based on the "Planet Hulk" storyline was in development, which Marvel Studios had no plans to adapt at the time. Marvel later adapted elements of "Planet Hulk" in Thor: Ragnarok (2017), where Hulk retroactively landed in Sakaar after the events of Age of Ultron.

==== Captain America: Civil War ====
In March 2014, Anthony and Joe Russo confirmed that they had signed on to return as directors for a third Captain America film, with Evans as Captain America, Feige as producer, and Christopher Markus and Stephen McFeely as screenwriters. Markus and McFeely had been working on the screenplay since late 2013, while the Russo brothers began work in February 2014. In April 2014, Marvel announced a release date of May 6, 2016. In July, Markus and McFeely stated that they were midway through a first draft for the film, on which principal photography was expected to begin in April 2015.

By October, Robert Downey Jr. had entered final negotiations to reprise his role as Stark in the film. Downey was added for the film to adapt the 2006–07 "Civil War" comic book storyline written by Mark Millar, which pitted Iron Man against Captain America. At the end of the month, it was confirmed that Sebastian Stan would return as Bucky Barnes / Winter Soldier. A few days later, Marvel revealed that the film would be titled Captain America: Civil War, confirming Downey's appearance and announcing that Chadwick Boseman would appear in the film as T'Challa / Black Panther ahead of his own solo film. In November, Daniel Brühl joined the cast as Helmut Zemo, while Anthony Mackie was confirmed to return as Sam Wilson / Falcon. Following the November 2014 hacking of Sony Pictures' computers, emails between Sony Pictures Entertainment co-chairman Amy Pascal and president Doug Belgrad were released stating that Marvel wanted to include Spider-Man, whose film rights are licensed to Sony, but talks between the studios were believed to have been terminated. However, by February 2015, the studios reached a licensing deal for the use of Spider-Man in an MCU film, indicated the character would appear in Civil War. The Russos stated they were lobbying for months to include the character in the film. In January 2015, the Russo brothers confirmed that Johansson would reprise her role in the film. Two months later, Renner was confirmed to be reprising his role. Additionally, Olsen revealed she would also reprise her role in the film. Feige also revealed that Hope van Dyne was in an original draft of the film, after receiving the Wasp costume at the end of Ant-Man, but was cut because "there are so many characters in Civil War that we didn't want to do her a disservice," saying Marvel was "saving" the character for a better environment to reveal van Dyne in the Wasp costume for the first time and see "her dynamic with Scott [Lang] in a way it could play out".

Anthony Russo stated that adapting the "Civil War" storyline was not always the intended storyline and direction for the film when the brothers initially signed on to return as directors. Markus expanded on this, saying the original concept for a third Captain America film "never got to draft", with Feige at some point telling the writing team to begin adapting "Civil War" around their original ideas. McFeely also added that, despite the shift in direction for the film, "The central theme, even the way Zemo is operating, are from that [early] iteration". McFeely said that the idea of basing a film on "Civil War" had "been on and off the table for a while" at Marvel Studios, explaining, "it's a challenge to do it and make sure that all the characters that we've established, and everyone's established in the MCU are serviced and sound correct. Because there's a difference between the characters in "Civil War", which was written in 2006, 2007. The MCU doesn't exist [when it was written]. There isn't a Robert Downey Jr. or Chris Evans who has helped create the character[s] so we need to make sure that that template gets adjusted". Joe Russo added that the "essence" of "Civil War" was used, such as "the concept of registration" and the notion that heroes need to be either supervised being applicable. Anthony Russo further went on to comment that superhero registration could become a political issue, wanting to avoid that and instead "figure out very personal reasons why everyone's relationship to this idea of registration is going to become complicated", particularly by focusing on Steve and Bucky's.

Executives at Marvel Entertainment balked at the idea of Captain America and Iron Man coming to blows at the end of the film and wanted the Avengers to unite to fight Zemo and the super-soldiers at the Hydra base in Siberia instead. The Russos were not happy with this idea, with Joe Russo saying, "There's nothing interesting about that film. We're not here to make that movie. We're not interested in telling another superhero story". Feige supported the Russos, who were going to leave the film if the changes were mandated on them. This prompted Walt Disney Studios head Alan F. Horn to back the Russos with making the film as originally intended and lead to Marvel Studios to be placed from Marvel Entertainment into Walt Disney Studios in 2015.

==== Infinity War and Endgame ====
Thanos, a villain who covets the Infinity Stones, was introduced to the MCU in a brief appearance at the end of The Avengers. Many fans subsequently expected Thanos to be the antagonist of Age of Ultron. However, Joss Whedon explained that the character would not be the primary antagonist until a later film due to his power, opting to save him for "the big finale". Thanos appears at the end of Age of Ultron in another brief appearance, shown with the Infinity Gauntlet, a glove designed to hold the Infinity Stones.

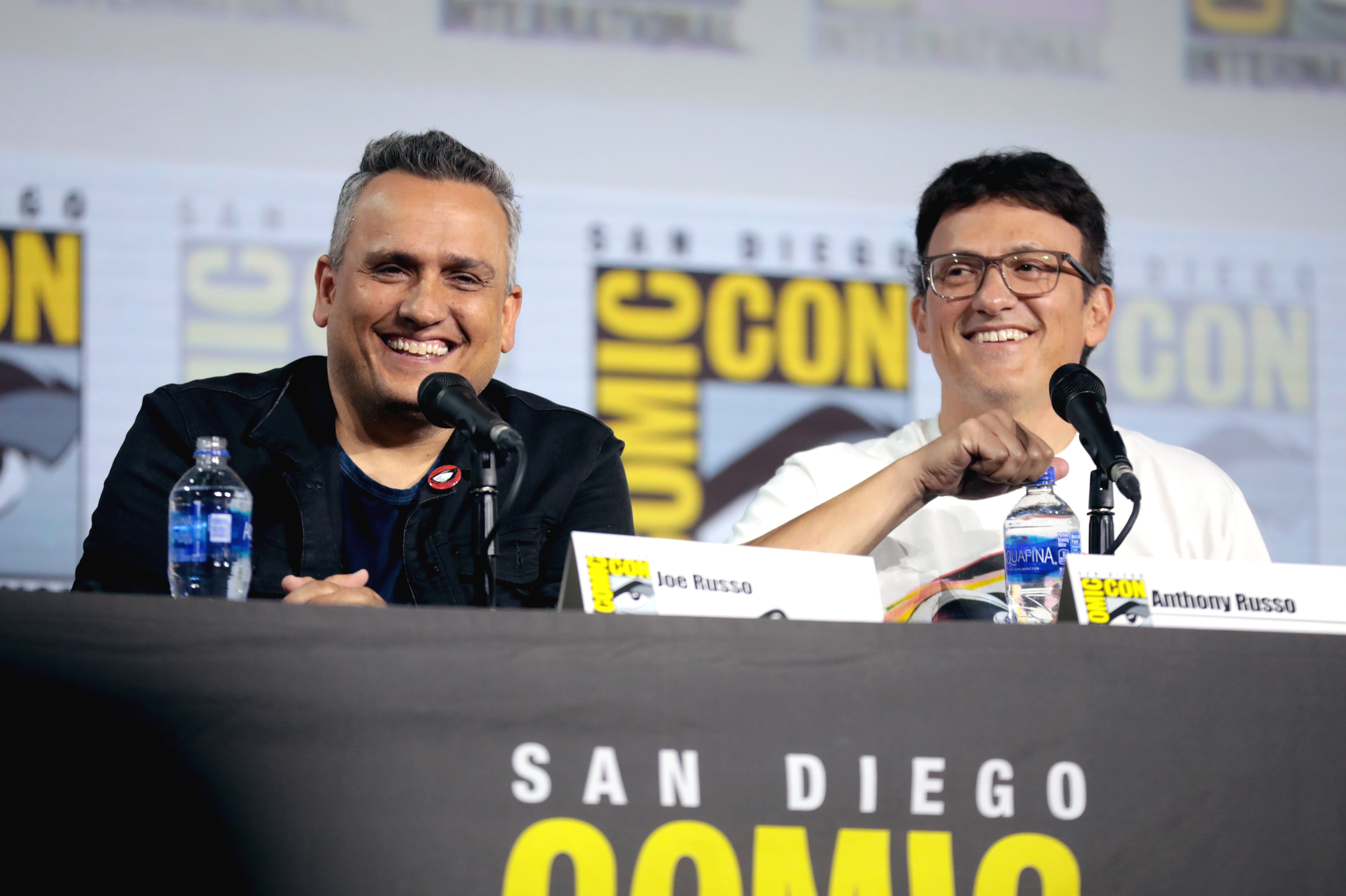
Directors Joe and Anthony Russo at the 2019 San Diego Comic-Con

In July 2014, Feige said there were "some notions" as to where Marvel would want to take a third Avengers film, and the studio was aiming for three years between Age of Ultron in 2015 and a sequel. In October 2014, Marvel announced a two-part sequel to Age of Ultron titled Avengers: Infinity War. Part 1 was scheduled to be released on May 4, 2018, and Part 2 was scheduled for May 3, 2019. Whedon was "very doubtful" that he would be involved with the two films by January 2015.

The Russo brothers reached a deal by April 2015 to direct both parts of Avengers: Infinity War, after previously directing the MCU films Captain America: The Winter Soldier and Captain America: Civil War. A month later, Markus and McFeely had signed on to also return from the Captain America films, writing the screenplays for both parts. McFeely later recalled that the pair had started negotiating to write the two films without ever actually being asked to do so by Feige or Marvel. Anthony Russo described the two Avengers sequels as the culmination of all the MCU films since Iron Man, bringing an end to some things and beginning others. Marvel called this overall storyline "The Infinity Saga", comprising Phases One, Two, and Three of the MCU. In April 2016, Jon Favreau said he would executive produce the films after doing the same for the previous Avengers films and also directing the first two Iron Man films. Gunn also served as executive producer on the films, working with the Russos, Marvel, and Feige to ensure the Guardians of the Galaxy characters were "well taken care of" in the films. In March 2018, Disney moved the first film's United States release to April 27, 2018, so it would be released on the same weekend in the U.S. as in several international markets. That December, the release of the second film was changed to April 26, 2019. In July 2016, Marvel announced that Part 1 would simply be known as Avengers: Infinity War and Part 2 would be called the Untitled Avengers film until a title was chosen. By December 2018, the second film's title was revealed to be Avengers: Endgame.

In June 2013, Robert Downey Jr. signed on to return as Tony Stark / Iron Man for a third Avengers film, and Josh Brolin signed a multi-film deal the following May, to play Thanos. In July 2014, Feige stated that actors from previous MCU films were under contract to return to for a third Avengers film, with Jeremy Renner stating that September he signed on to reprise the role of Barton. After the announcement of Infinity War and Endgame, many established MCU actors were confirmed to be joining Downey and Brolin, including Hemsworth, Ruffalo, Evans, Johansson, Cheadle, Bettany, Olsen, and Anthony Mackie as Sam Wilson / Falcon. Infinity War also sees the Avengers unite with the Guardians of the Galaxy, including Karen Gillan as Nebula and Bradley Cooper as the voice of Rocket.

Additional actors reprising their roles in Infinity War from the various MCU franchises include Benedict Cumberbatch as Stephen Strange from Doctor Strange (2016), Tom Holland as Peter Parker / Spider-Man from Spider-Man: Homecoming (2017), and Chadwick Boseman as T'Challa / Black Panther from Captain America: Civil War and Black Panther, with Danai Gurira as Okoye from the latter. Sebastian Stan also appears as Bucky Barnes / Winter Soldier from the Captain America films. Jackson and Smulders also reprised their roles in uncredited cameos in the post-credits scene.

Actors who returned for Endgame include: Downey, Hemsworth, Ruffalo, Evans, Johansson, Cumberbatch, Cheadle, Holland, Boseman, Olsen, Mackie, Stan, Gillan, Cooper, and Brolin. Olsen was not contractually obliged to return due to Infinity War fulfilling her original three-film contract with Marvel, but Feige persuaded her to return in Endgame by pitching her the concept of the then-upcoming Disney+ series WandaVision (2021). They were also joined by Renner as Barton, Evangeline Lilly as Hope van Dyne, Paul Rudd as Scott Lang, and Brie Larson as Carol Danvers.

=== Differences from the comics ===
While the name "Avengers" and the depiction of Loki as the first antagonist is derived more from the mainstream Marvel Universe, commonly referred to as "Earth-616", other different depictions such as the original formation of the Avengers at the hands of S.H.I.E.L.D. along with the depicted original lineup and the portrayal of the aliens known as Chitauri as main antagonists were portrayed with a similar premise as the Ultimates, a modern reimagining of the Avengers within the comic book universe within the multiverse that is published by Marvel Comics. The original lineup of the Avengers included Hank Pym and the Wasp instead of Captain America, Black Widow and Hawkeye. The Ultimates introduced the same lineup of The Avengers with the Earth-616's version and the addition of Scarlet Witch and Quicksilver, both of whom later appeared in Age of Ultron. The characters Nebula, Rocket Raccoon and Joaquin Torres do not feature as Avengers members in the comics, differing from the film adaptations, while Yelena Belova, Red Guardian, Ghost, and the U.S. Agent are also not members of the New Avengers in the comics.

== Reception ==
Critics praised the team's introduction as the main highlight of The Avengers. A. O. Scott of The New York Times felt the chemistry of the characters was the best part of the film. Owen Gleiberman of Entertainment Weekly commented that the best thing regarding the film "is that it also unleashes them on each other. Simply put: These freaks of goodness may be a team, but they don't like one another very much". Joe Morgenstern of The Wall Street Journal opined that the depiction of them quarreling among themselves comically was the most fun part as depicted in the original film. The team once again mostly received praise in the sequel with critics praising the original cast reprising the role in Age of Ultron. Scott Foundas of Variety felt that the actors now "wear these roles as comfortably as second skins". He noted the Fantastic Four and Justice League as teams that can only hope to follow in the footsteps regarding the portrayal of the characters. Conversely, Scott Mendelson of Forbes disliked the concept that some of the Avengers (Tony Stark and Bruce Banner) were behind the creation of the antagonist of the film (Ultron).

The depiction of the Avengers being divided in a Civil War as shown in Captain America: Civil War was praised by critics such as Peter Bradshaw of The Guardian and Richard Roeper of the Chicago Sun-Times. However, Nicholas Barber of the BBC was more critical of the depiction, opining that their allegiance didn't make sense. Additionally, Stephen Whitty of the New York Daily News was critical of the expansion of many heroes taking sides. The film was referred to as "Avengers 2.5" by commentators and fans, given the ensemble nature of the cast resembled that of the Avengers films, and the fact that the film no longer felt centered around Captain America. Feige responded by saying "What's fun about Civil War though is, as you know from the comics, it's a very simple story. And it really has to be, to accommodate that many players".

In 2018, around the time that Infinity War came out, film director James Cameron started a new term called "Avengers fatigue" that circulated online. Cameron told IndieWire that despite being a fan of the films, he feared that they had dominated the film genre, and that he hoped that people were getting tired of it so other stories could be told. This resulted in some criticism and backlash online regarding Cameron. The fourth Avengers film, Avengers: Endgame, was praised as a proper conclusion for the superhero team.

=== Themes and analysis ===
According to film critic Peter Travers, The Avengers director Joss Whedon "sees the Avengers as the ultimate dysfunctional family. Their powers have estranged them from the normal world. As a result, they're lonely, cranky, emotional fuck-ups, which the actors have a ball playing". Also while reviewing the original Avengers films, Roger Ebert compared the original six lineup of the Avengers as uniquely different much like the assortment of dog breeds that consists of champions of the Westminster Kennel Club Dog Show. He noted that both examples "are completely different" but "yet they're all champions". Anthony Lane of The New Yorker explained that the superhero group was reminiscent to the supergroup Traveling Wilburys in music pop-culture. Callie Ahlgrim of Insider Inc. described the Avengers as "the most ambitious superpowered team in cinematic history" when doing a rank down of most powerful Avengers within the MCU.

=== Cultural impact ===
Before the MCU built up to the Avengers, shared film universes were virtually unheard of in Hollywood according to Tom Russo of Boston.com, with few exceptions like Alien vs. Predator (2004). Since the release of The Avengers, the shared universe model created by Marvel Studios has begun to be replicated by other film studios that held rights to other comic book characters, notably DC Entertainment and Warner Bros. Pictures. Warner Bros. announced their plans to release a Justice League film following a legal victory over Joe Shuster's estate for the rights to Superman. The planned film would unite DC Comics superheroes such as Batman, Superman, and Wonder Woman. The company was expected to take the opposite approach to Marvel, releasing individual films for the characters after they have appeared in a team-up film.

In November 2012, 20th Century Fox announced plans to create their own shared universe, consisting of Marvel properties that it holds the rights to including the Fantastic Four and X-Men, with the hiring of Mark Millar as supervising producer. X-Men: Days of Future Past (2014) was Fox's first step towards expanding their stable of Marvel properties and creating this universe, ahead of the release of a Fantastic Four reboot film the next year. In November 2013, Sony Pictures Entertainment Co-chairman Amy Pascal announced that the studio intended to expand their universe created within Marc Webb's The Amazing Spider-Man series, with spin-off adventures for supporting characters, in an attempt to replicate Marvel and Disney's model. The next month, Sony announced Venom and Sinister Six films, both set in the Amazing Spider-Man universe. With this announcement, IGN stated that the spin-offs are "the latest example of what we can refer to as "the Avengers effect" in Hollywood, as studios work to build interlocking movie universes".

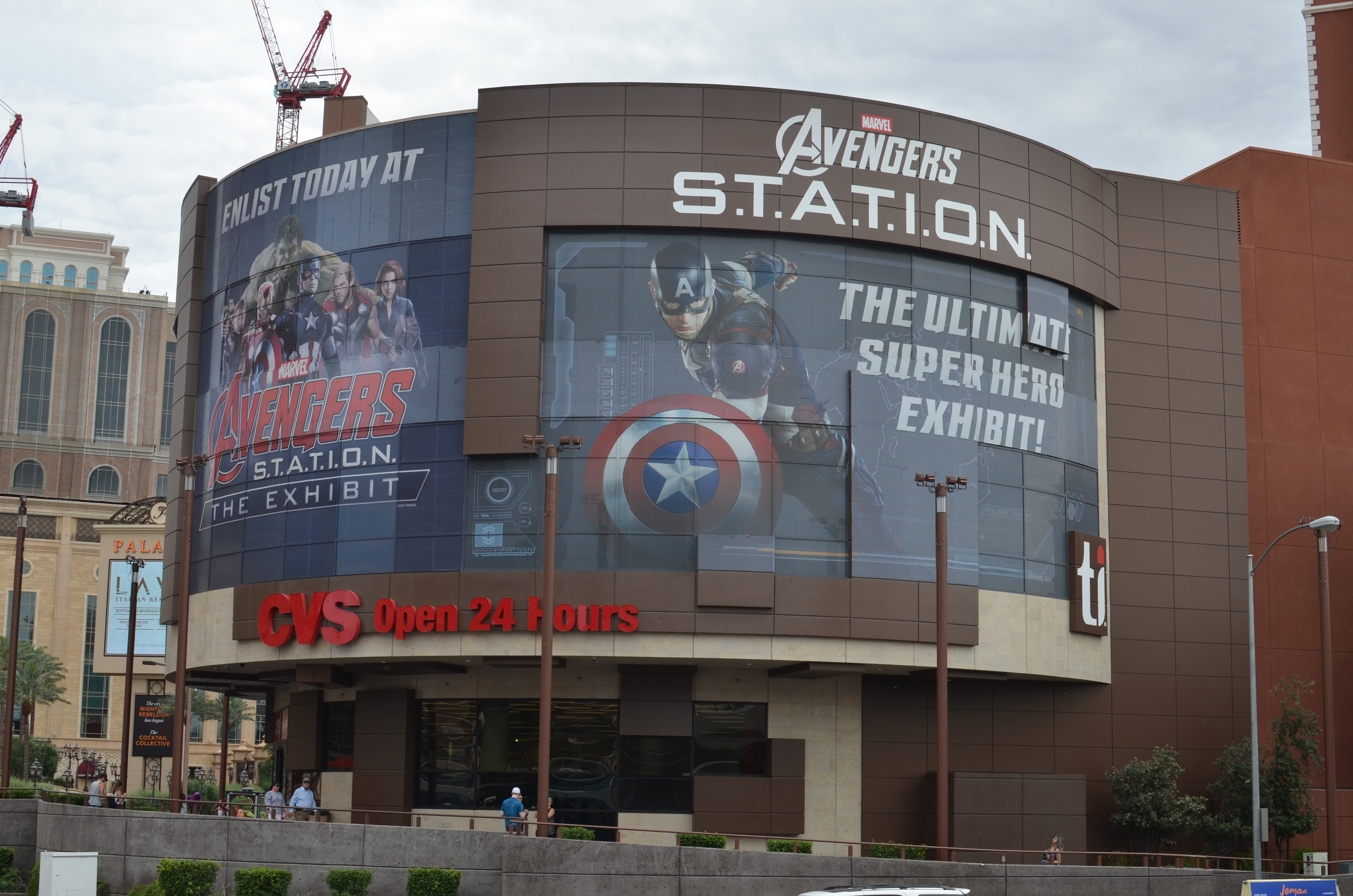
A Marvel Avengers S.T.A.T.I.O.N in Las Vegas

The team was the inspiration behind the documentary series Marvel's Avengers: Building A Cinematic Universe in 2012. Another documentary series was created in 2014 titled Marvel Studios: Assembling a Universe. An online exhibition called Avengers S.T.A.T.I.O.N. based on the team is currently located in Las Vegas, Xi'an, and São Paulo, with a planned upcoming one in Dallas. Avengers Campus, a series of attractions at various Disney Parks, is inspired by the MCU's Avengers, although it is an alternate version of the team. The first of these Campuses opened on June 4, 2021, at Disney California Adventure. In March 2018, the Walt Disney Company announced a new Avengers Campus for Disneyland Paris' Walt Disney Studios Park. The area includes a reimagined attraction where riders team up with Iron Man and other Avengers on a "hyper-kinetic adventure", and opened on July 20, 2022. In July 2021, the immersive family dining experience "Avengers: Quantum Encounter" at the Worlds of Marvel restaurant on the Disney Wish cruise ship was announced, which debuted when the cruise began voyages on July 14, 2022. The experience takes place during dinner with interactive elements and a full CGI recreation of the Wish's upper decks.

=== Box-office performance ===
Avengers franchise
Film	Box office gross	Ref.
The Avengers	$1,518,815,515	
Age of Ultron	$1,402,809,540	
Infinity War	$2,048,359,754	
Endgame	$2,942,649,778	
Total	$7,912,634,587	

The Avengers franchise is the third highest-grossing superhero franchise and the fifth highest-grossing film franchise of all-time at the worldwide box office, grossing over US$7.7 billion. Endgame became the highest-grossing film of all time in July 2019, surpassing Avatar (2009), however, Avatar was re-released in China in March 2021, reclaiming its top spot. Endgame eventually regained the title upon the release of its extended version, subtitled Encore, in 2026.

=== Future ===
The Avengers are set to return in two additional films, Avengers: Doomsday (2026) and Avengers: Secret Wars (2027). Both films will be part of the MCU's Phase Six, concluding the Multiverse Saga.

== In other media ==
=== Literature ===
The book Wakanda Files: A Technological Exploration of the Avengers and Beyond (2020) focuses on the Avengers heroes from Shuri's perspective. Marvel Comics published Dan Abnett's Avengers: Everybody Wants To Rule The World (2015) as a tie-in to Avengers: Age of Ultron. The lineup in the book includes Iron Man, Captain America, the Hulk, Thor, Black Widow, Hawkeye, Quicksilver, the Scarlet Witch, and the Vision.

=== Video games and virtual reality ===
Lego Marvel's Avengers (2016) was released for PlayStation 4, PlayStation 3, PlayStation Vita, Nintendo 3DS, Wii U, Xbox One, Xbox 360, Macintosh, and Microsoft Windows. The story mainly focuses on the plots of The Avengers and Age of Ultron, but also includes individual levels for Captain America: The First Avenger, Iron Man 3, Thor: The Dark World (2013), and Captain America: The Winter Soldier (2014). Marvel's Avengers features multiple MCU suit skins inspired from the Iron Spider armor from Infinity War, while 2018's Spider-Man also features the Iron Spider armor.

In October 2019, Marvel Studios and ILMxLAB announced the virtual reality experience Avengers: Damage Control. It was available for a limited time starting in mid-October 2019 at select Void VR locations until the end of the year. ESPN and Marvel collaborated to create an alternate presentation that featured the Avengers among other Marvel superheroes entitled NBA Special Edition Presented by State Farm: Marvel's Arena of Heroes during the NBA playoff of the Golden State Warriors and the New Orleans Pelicans in May 2021.

== See also ==
- Characters of the Marvel Cinematic Universe
- Teams and organizations of the Marvel Cinematic Universe
