= America (Spanish automobile) =

Spanish automobile model

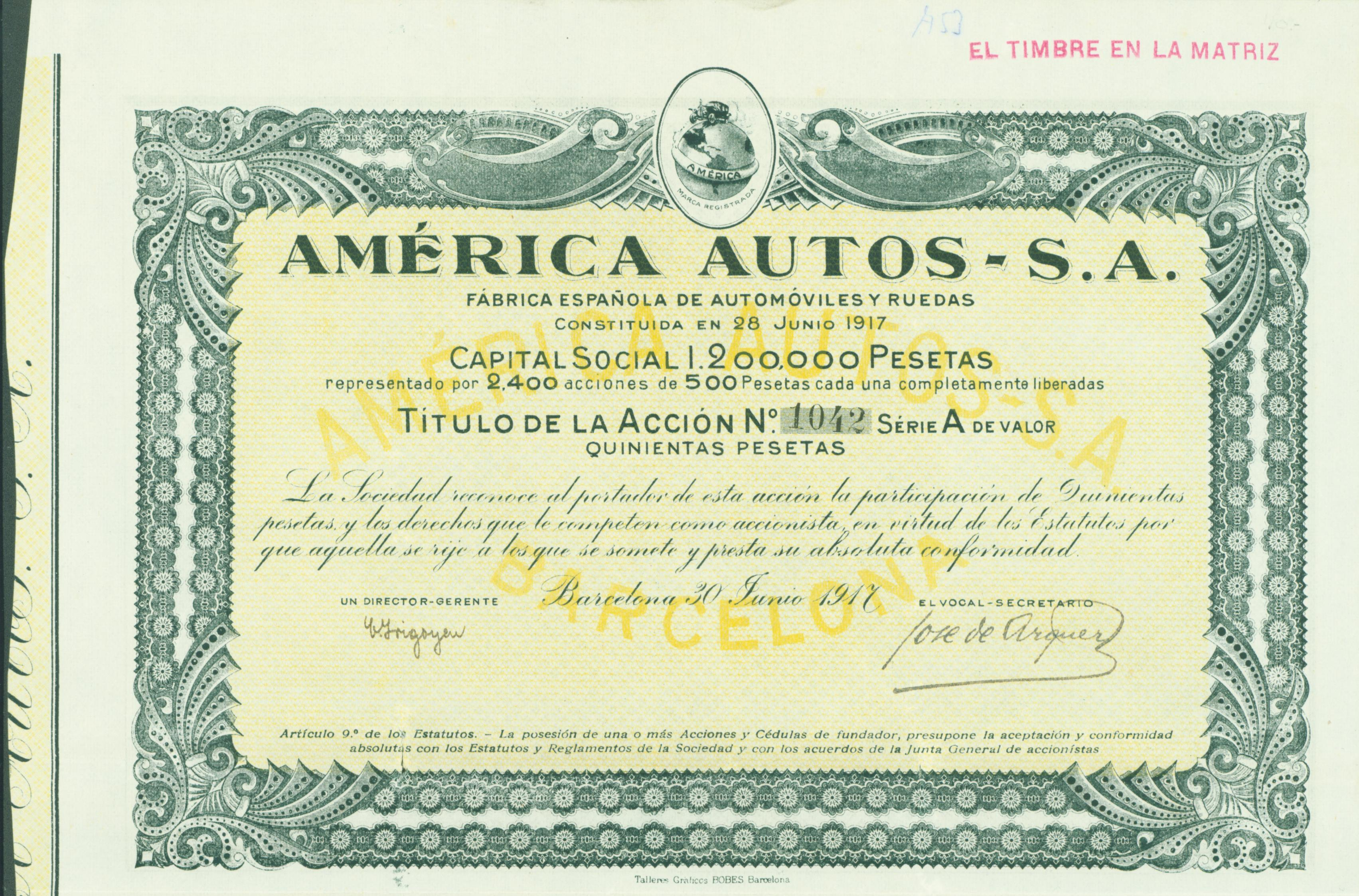
Share of the América Autos SA, issued 30 june 1917

The America was a Spanish automobile manufactured in Barcelona from 1917 to 1922. The four-cylinder "valveless" model, the "Tipo A", had a primitive synchromesh gearbox and worm final drive. The firm's main product was the 1097cc "Tipo B"; the "Tipo C" was an ohv racing model.

== History ==
The general director and technical director of América Autos was engineer Manuel Pazos. One of his early designs was an elastic wheel intended to replace the inner tube tire, though the invention did not gain much acceptance due to technical issues. Another of his designs was a type of engine distribution system in which valves were replaced by what he called "rotary conical distributors." The general representation of the company was entrusted to Arcadi de Bobes, who had a showroom at 30 Balmes Street, where he also sold French Hurtu cars and British Dennis trucks.

In 1917, the company introduced its first model under the "América" brand, the Tipo A, equipped with a four-cylinder engine. The model featured several innovations, including the aforementioned distribution system, a proprietary synchronized carburetor and gearbox (the first built in Spain), a pressurized lubrication system, and an original patented leaf spring and suspension system. The elastic wheel was offered as an option (the car came with conventional wheels as standard). Despite these innovations, the Tipo A was not commercially successful.

The failure of the Tipo A forced the company to reconsider its business strategy, and in 1919 it introduced the Tipo B, a small conventional car with a body designed by industrial coachbuilder Alfons Lucas, who had workshops at 345 Còrsega Street in Barcelona. The Tipo B was presented at the 1919 Barcelona Auto Show, where it received a favorable reception.

In 1921, the Tipo C was introduced, based on the B and intended for competition, but only one unit was ever produced. The bodywork was also crafted by Alfons Lucas. Finally, in 1922, the factory closed its doors.
