= América del Pilar Rodrigo =

Argentine botanist

América del Pilar Rodrigo was an Argentine botanist and explorer. Born in the early 20th century, she received a doctorate in botany from the National University of La Plata, and notably worked to classify genera of the family Malvaceae and other spermatophytes.
