= The American (statue) =

Proposed bronze statue of a Native American

Coordinates: 36°12′26″N 96°2′57″W

The American is a proposed 217 ft (66 m) bronze statue of a Native American, created by sculptor Shan Gray, and currently proposed for construction in Sand Springs, Oklahoma, near Tulsa.

The statue was originally proposed to be built at Holmes Peak in southeastern Osage County, located about 7 miles (11 km) northwest of downtown Tulsa and the highest point in the immediate region with an altitude of 1030 ft (314 m). The site was adjacent to the grounds of Tulsa's Centennial Botanical Garden (now called the Tulsa Botanic Garden).

According to the proposal, The American, designed in the image of an American Indian brave with a bald eagle on his shoulder, will rise 60 ft (20 m) taller than the Statue of Liberty, and will be the largest bronze statue in the world with an interior observation deck. The eagle will have an 82 ft (25 m) wingspan.

Gray, who is Osage, and has built a career on large-scale sculptures of Oklahoman sports figures such as New York Yankees pitcher Allie "Superchief" Reynolds and Heisman Trophy winner Billy Vessels, conceived The American as an entry for a contest to design a statue for the dome of the Oklahoma State Capitol, which was added to the building in 2001. Initially intended for the outskirts of Oklahoma City, the Tulsa location was selected after investor disinterest. The design was enlarged for the landmark Holmes Peak site and for visitor access, and will include a visitor center and other amenities and underground access to the statue, rather than directly at the base, to preserve the natural setting.

According to a statement by developers in Spring 2007, the project was anticipated to break ground in late 2007 and be completed in 2011. It was originally intended for the 100th anniversary of Oklahoma's admission as a U.S. state in 1907. However, as of 2016, the project remained unbuilt. In April 2011, the Osage Nation appropriated $2.5 million as a potential contribution toward the project, but the tribe's investment entity then decided not to accept the appropriation.

In 2012, it was reported that the city of Sand Springs was working with Gray to build the statue, possibly at a different location within the city limits of Sand Springs, and in June 2013, the city council approved funding for an engineering study. The Wall Street Journal wrote about the project in August 2013 and noted the project would fit in with two existing large scale sculptures in Tulsa: the Praying Hands on the campus of Oral Roberts University and the Golden Driller at the Tulsa Expo Center.

== See also ==
- Crazy Horse Memorial
