= Only in America =

Only in America may refer to:

== Film and TV ==
- Only in America (TV series), a BBC children's television programme
- Only in America with Larry the Cable Guy, an American reality TV show

== Music ==
- Only in Amerika, a 2004 album by Hed PE
- Only in America (Jay and the Americans song)
- Only in America (Brooks & Dunn song)
