= America (American automobile) =

Defunct American motor vehicle manufacturer

The America was an American automobile built by the Motor Car Co. of America, New York City, New York in 1911. It was available in five models, all with an L-head 4-cylinder engine giving off 40 hp (30 kW). The torpedo, capable of holding two passengers, had a long, low silhouette and a rounded aft-section. Unusually, these cars had an auxiliary 1.5 US gal (5.7 L) fuel tank. It is claimed that this company was later associated with McIntyre Automobile.
