= América (2010 film) =

2010 film by João Nuno Pinto

- Film poster
- Directed by: João Nuno Pinto
- Written by: Luísa Costa Gomes; Melanie Dimantas
- Produced by: Miguel Varela; Pandora da Cunha Telles
- Starring: Chulpan Khamatova; Fernando Luís; María Barranco; Cassiano Carneiro; Dinarte Branco; Raul Solnado
- Cinematography: Carlos Lopes
- Edited by: Luca Alverdi
- Music by: Mikel Salas
- Production companies: Ukbar Filmes; Plan2Play LLC
- Distributed by: NOS Audiovisuais (Europe); Panda Filmes (International)
- Release dates: November 2010 (Huelva); May 26, 2011 (Portugal)
- Running time: 111 minutes
- Country: Portugal
- Languages: Portuguese, Spanish, Russian, Cape Verdean Creole

América (Russian: Америка, romanized: Amerika) is a 2010 Portuguese-Russian drama film, directed, written, co-produced and co-edited by Portuguese director João Nuno Pinto. The film stars Chulpan Khamatova, Fernando Luís, María Barranco and Manuel Custódia. It is a story about illegal immigration, crime and drug dealing. It marks the directorial debut of João Nuno Pinto.

The film premiered at the 2010 Festival de Cine Iberoamericano de Huelva.

== Cast ==
- Chulpan Khamatova - Liza
- Fernando Luís - Vitor
- María Barranco - Fernanda
- Manuel Custódia - Mauro
- Dinarte Branco - Paulo Armando
- Cassiano Carneiro - Matias
- Raul Solnado - Melo
- Mikhail Evlanov - Andrei
- Francisco 'Paco' Maestre - Tolentino
- Nikolai Glinskiy - Aleksander
