= Air America =

Air America may refer to:

- Air America (airline), a former civilian airline operated by the Central Intelligence Agency
- Air America, a US irregular air carrier from the 1940s and 1950s, unrelated to the CIA airline
- Air America (book), 1979 non-fiction book by Christopher Robbins
- Air America (film), a 1990 film adaptation of Robbins' book
- Air America (radio network), a former American radio network specializing in liberal talk programming
- Air America (TV series), a 1998–1999 TV series
