= América Paraguay =

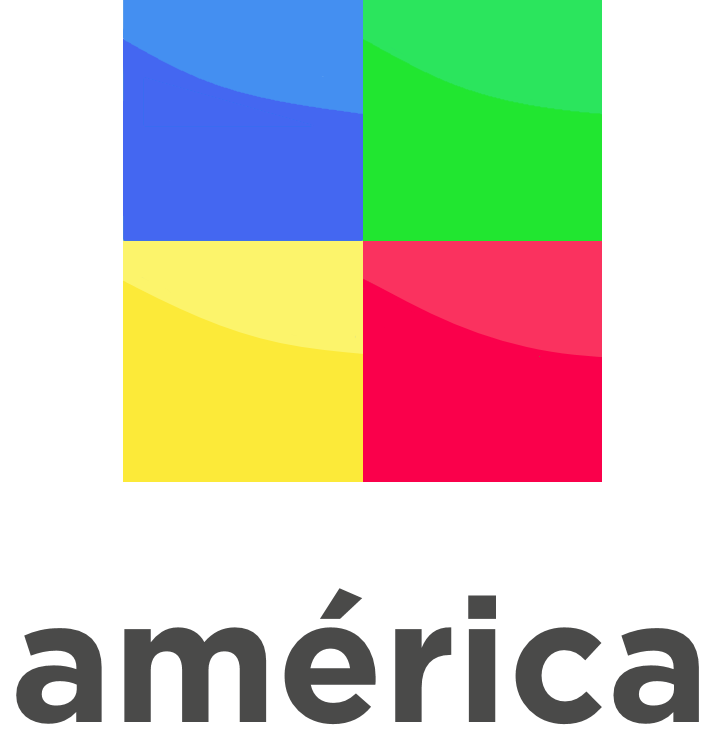
- Country: Paraguay
- Broadcast area: Paraguay
- Headquarters: Asunción, Paraguay

Programming
- Picture format: 1080i HDTV

Ownership
- Owner: Grupo América

History
- Launched: 2018

Availability

Terrestrial
- Digital UHF (Paraguay): Channel 30.1

América Paraguay is a Paraguayan over-the-air television network owned by Argentine media conglomerate Grupo América. The station relays programming from the group's main station in Argentina and also airs its own programs.

== History ==
On March 8, 2017, Conatel received two digital television bids from DTH Magnética, S.A. and Mercuria S.A., companies with links to Grupo América. Officially, the Paraguayan legislation forbids the same company from obtaining more than one license, but América made a loophole by setting up two separate companies. If awarded, the law would provide the new channel with a minimum 18-hour line-up for Asunción and a 12-hour line-up for the rest of the country.

América Paraguay was revealed at the end of February 2018, with the second license being granted for A24. The network announced a casting event for interested presenters and journalists on March 1, at its studios in El Bagre. In early April, Diego Martínez, formerly of the Vierci channels (Latele, Noticias PY and Red Guaraní) was hired by the group's Argentine managers. The group launched the Primicias Ya website on August 22, while América Paraguay and the Paraguayan feed of A24 both started experimental broadcasts at the same time. América Paraguay was set to replace the Argentine version of the channel on Tigo.

The first original program made for América Paraguay, Desde arriba (From Above) with Denise Hunter, was announced in November 2018, as a pre-recorded talk show set to air on Saturday nights. At the time, A24 was beginning to include Paraguayan news items, interrupting the Argentine feed.

On May 20, 2019, América Paraguay increased its local programs by starting live morning programming, which was shared with A24. The new schedule started at 5:30am with Buenos Días América, Las Mañaneras at 7:30am, En Consulta at 10:30am and Que Comience la Función at 11am. In August, two presenters from América Paraguay visited the Grupo América building in Buenos Aires, being invited by the main América TV channel for a few days. In late September, Intrusos presenter Pamela David visited the Paraguayan station to interview local presenter Denise Hutter. In November, Julieta Navarro decided to leave the Argentine version of Buenos días América to join América Paraguay. Her program, A solas, premiered on January 19, 2020.

In September 2020, Denise Hutter announced that she was moving to ABC TV. Norita Rodríguez joined the channel.

In June 2023, Marcelo Tinelli announced the possibility of visiting Paraguay. He arrived on August 2 and planned to bring a Paraguayan artist to the Argentine format Bailando por un sueño that would air on the América networks in both countries.
