= Killing of America Thayer =

Killing and beheading of a Minnesota woman

America Thayer
- Born: America Mafalda Thayer
- Died: 28 July 2021; Shakopee, Minnesota
- Cause of death: Decapitation

On the afternoon of 28 July 2021, a decapitated body was discovered in the middle of an intersection in Shakopee, Minnesota, a Twin Cities suburb; the head was also found nearby. The victim was identified as America Mafalda Thayer, a 55-year-old woman from Shakopee. The perpetrator was identified as 42-year-old Alexis Saborit, an illegal immigrant from Cuba and Thayer's boyfriend. He was apprehended by police 1.5 miles away from the scene and faced first-degree murder charges. In 2023, Saborit was acquitted by reason of mental illness.

== Suspect ==
Alexis Saborit was the boyfriend of America Thayer; the two had been dating for roughly seven years.

Saborit is an illegal immigrant from Cuba, who was wanted by U.S. Immigration and Customs Enforcement. According to them, he has a criminal record which included domestic assault charges in Minnesota and Louisiana, a DUI, and running from a police officer. They attempted to deport him in 2012, but Cuba would not approve his travel documents and so he remained in the country.

He was convicted of domestic violence in 2017 when he pinned Thayer to the ground after becoming suspicious that she had been speaking to another man at a bar. Before the trial, a restraining order was put in place against him, but was removed after Thayer sent the court a handwritten note asking for it to be overturned.

Saborit was scheduled to appear in Scott County court on the day of the killing on charges of arson after he allegedly set fire to his apartment.

After two psychological evaluations of the defendant, the Scott County Attorney acknowledged the case was headed toward a likely finding of not guilty by reason of mental illness.

== Killing ==
On 28 July 2021, Saborit and Thayer were driving through Shakopee. According to Saborit, an altercation between the two of them broke out after Thayer told him that she wanted to break up with him. Saborit pulled out a machete, which he often carried with him, and beheaded Thayer.

At around 2:30 PM, the Shakopee Police Department responded to a report of a headless body dumped from a car near 4th and Spencer. When they arrived on the scene, they found Thayer's headless body, along with her head, lying near her car. She was pronounced dead on the scene. Further investigation of the scene revealed a machete and bloody clothing in the recycling bin of a nearby alleyway.

Police documents show that several people witnessed the killing. One person recorded a video of Saborit dumping the body, then picking up Thayer's head by the hair. Another reported seeing Saborit hitting something and throwing it.

== Legal proceedings ==
Local police found Saborit wandering near Minnesota State Highway 101 and Shenandoah Parkway. They arrested him at The Landing historical village. He was roughly 1.5 miles away from the scene and three blocks away from the hotel he had been staying at; The Travelodge. He was charged with second-degree murder; his bail was set at $2.5 million. In an interview with the police, he admitted to killing Thayer with a machete. According to the Scott County court system, he was assigned a public defender at his request. His first court appearance was scheduled for August 9. On July 17, 2023, Saborit was acquitted of the killing by reason of mental illness.
