= Captain America (disambiguation) =

Captain America is a superhero created by Joe Simon and Jack Kirby who appears in American comic books published by Marvel Comics.

== Characters ==
- Captain America (Ultimate Marvel character), a parallel universe counterpart of Captain America
- Alternative versions of Captain America, noting the various other characters to use the title of Captain America in comics
- In the Marvel Cinematic Universe:
  - Steve Rogers (Marvel Cinematic Universe), the first person to use the "Captain America" name
  - John Walker (Marvel Cinematic Universe), the second person to use the "Captain America" name
  - Sam Wilson (Marvel Cinematic Universe), the third person to use the "Captain America" name

== Comics ==
- Captain America (comic book), a Marvel comics series

== Films ==
- Captain America (serial), 1944 serial film
- Captain America (1979 film), starring Reb Brown
  - Captain America II: Death Too Soon, a 1979 sequel
- Captain America (1990 film), starring Matt Salinger
- Captain America: The First Avenger, 2011 film starring Chris Evans
  - Captain America: The Winter Soldier, a 2014 film and sequel to The First Avenger
  - Captain America: Civil War, 2016 film and sequel to The Winter Soldier
  - Captain America: Brave New World, 2025 film starring Anthony Mackie

== People nicknamed Captain America ==
- John Carlson (ice hockey), National Hockey League defenseman for the Washington Capitals
- Randy Couture, mixed martial arts fighter
- Claudio Reyna, former captain of the United States men's national soccer team
- Spencer Stone, U.S. Air Force staff sergeant
- David Wright, player for Major League Baseball team the New York Mets
- Christian Pulisic, professional soccer player for AC Milan and current captain of the United States men's national team
- Joe Pavelski, professional hockey player currently playing for the NHL's Dallas Stars
- Ryan Hunter-Reay, professional motorsports driver, 2012 IndyCar Champion and 2014 Indy 500 winner.
- Patrick Reed, professional golfer, 2018 Masters Tournament champion

== Other ==
- Captain America (Jimmy Buffett album), a 2002 album by Jimmy Buffett
- Captain America, a chopper motorcycle in the feature film Easy Rider

== See also ==
- Captain America in film
- Captain America in other media
- Captain America in: The Doom Tube of Dr. Megalomann, 1987
- Captain America and The Avengers, 1991
