= Nazrin Choudhury =

British screenwriter, director and actress

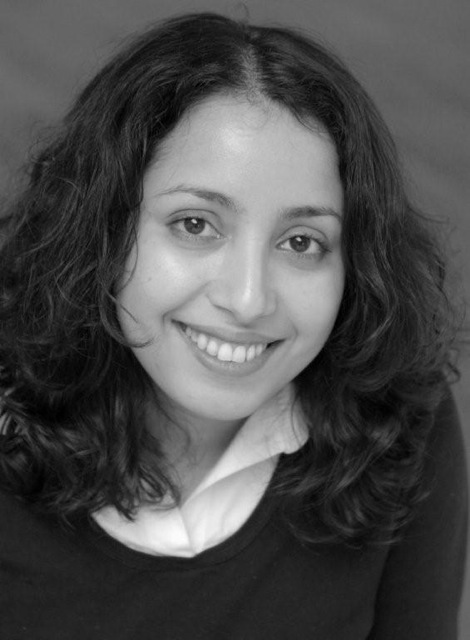
- Headshot
- Born: South West London, England
- Education: King's College London; Northern Film School
- Occupations: Screenwriter, director, producer, actress, author, playwright, producer
- Years active: 2001–present
- Style: Drama
- Awards: Richard Imison Award "Mixed Blood" (2006); DNA Films Focus on Talent "Scum"

Nazrin Choudhury is a British-American screenwriter, director, producer, and actress of Bangladeshi descent. She is best known for her extensive work in American television, and her Academy Award-nominated short film Red, White and Blue.

== Early life ==
Choudhury was born in South West London, England to parents of Bangladeshi origin. She graduated with a BSc in Biomedical Science from King's College London, and completed an MA in Screenwriting at the Northern Film School, having received a FilmFour Productions/Channel 4 Award.

== Career ==
Choudhury scripted episodes of British television serials such as Casualty, Doctors, EastEnders and Waterloo Road. She also worked as a storyline writer on Coronation Street. Her radio play Mixed Blood won the Richard Imison Award in 2006.

In 2006, she was awarded a grant for the arts by the Arts Council England for her first novel My England. Her first screenplay Scum won the "Focus on Talent" award, a competition run by DNA Films.

Choudhury was selected as one of the ten finalists for the 2014 Fox Writers Intensive. She moved to the United States and has written for Fox's Houdini and Doyle, Wayward Pines, Amazon's Jack Ryan and most recently, wrote and produced on Fear the Walking Dead. On 17 September 2020, she was announced as the writer of American Radical for Universal, based the memoir written by Kevin Maurer and Tamer Elnoury. It is to be directed by Sam Esmail.

In 2023, Nazrin Choudhury wrote, directed, and produced the Oscar-nominated short film Red, White and Blue starring Brittany Snow and Juliet Donenfeld. Red, White and Blue garnered critical acclaim in the industry, winning both the Grand Jury Prize at the Edmonton International Film Festival and the Industry Choice Award at Dances with Films: New York. The film, which served as Choudhury's directorial debut, earned her an Oscar Nomination at the 96th Academy Awards.

== Personal life ==
Choudhury is currently based in Los Angeles.

== Filmography ==
=== Writer ===
| Year | Title | Notes | Distributor |
|---|---|---|---|
| 2003–2004 | EastEnders | 2 episodes | BBC One |
| 2004–2011 | Doctors | 4 episodes | BBC One |
| 2006 | Casualty | 2 episodes | BBC One |
| 2006 | Mixed Blood | BBC Radio Play | BBC Radio 4 |
| 2009 | Waterloo Road | 1 episode | BBC One |
| 2011 | Everywhere and Nowhere | Additional writing | Mara Pictures |
| 2016 | Damien | 1 episode | A&E |
| 2016 | Houdini and Doyle | 1 episode, Co-producer (10 episodes) | Fox |
| 2016 | Wayward Pines | 1 episode, Co-producer (10 episodes) | Fox |
| 2017–2018 | Damnation | 2 episodes, Supervising producer (10 episodes) | USA Network |
| 2018 | Jack Ryan | 1 episode, Producer | Amazon Prime Video |
| 2019 | Blood & Treasure | 1 episode, Supervising producer (3 episodes) | CBS |
| 2020–2023 | Fear the Walking Dead | 8 episodes, co-executive producer (38 episodes) | AMC |
| 2023 | Red, White and Blue | Live Action Short Film, writer/director | - |

=== Actor ===
| Year | Title | Role |
|---|---|---|
| 2001 | Mersey Beat | Pharmacist (1 episode) |
| 2002 | Blood Strangers | Air Stewardess (TV Film) |
| 2004 | Kismet Road | Yasmin Munir (1 episode) |
| 2007 | Emmerdale | Nurse Gould (2 episodes) |
| 2009 | The Royal Today | Maya (1 episode) |

== See also ==
- List of British Bangladeshis
