= Interrupting Chicken (TV series) =

Children's animated series on Apple TV+

- Promotional poster
- Genre: Children's; Animated; Educational
- Created by: David Ezra Stein
- Based on: Interrupting Chicken by David Ezra Stein
- Developed by: Ron Holsey
- Directed by: Christian Larocque; Emma Gignac; Eden Riegel (voice)
- Voices of: Sterling K. Brown; Juliet Donenfeld; Luke Lowe; Maximus Tran; Jakari Fraser; Sarah Elizabeth Thompson
- Opening theme: "Interrupting Chicken Theme" performed by The Big Moon
- Composer: Leo Birenberg
- Countries of origin: United States; Canada
- Original language: English
- No. of seasons: 2
- No. of episodes: 17

Production
- Executive producers: Loris Kramer Lunsford; Ron Holsey; David Ezra Stein; Clint Eland
- Running time: 23–26 minutes
- Production company: Mercury Filmworks

Original release
- Network: Apple TV+
- Release: November 18, 2022 – September 29, 2023

Interrupting Chicken is a children's animated television series for Apple TV+. The series is based on the children's book of the same name by David Ezra Stein. The first season was released on November 18, 2022. Later, the second season premiered on September 29, 2023.

== Premise ==
The series follows a little red chicken named Piper who is a writer and likes to jump in to rewrite stories with imagination.

== Cast and characters ==
- Sterling K. Brown as Papa
- Juliet Donenfeld as Piper
- Luke Lowe as Duckston
- Maximus Riegel (credited as Maximus Tran) as Benjamin
- Jakari Fraser as Theodore
- Sarah Elizabeth Thompson as CJ
- Mary Faber as Mom

== Episodes ==
=== Series overview ===
Season	Episodes	Originally released	
Season	Episodes	First released	Last released
1	9	November 18, 2022	December 2, 2022
2	8	September 29, 2023	

=== Season 1 (2022) ===
No. overall	No. in season	Title	Directed by	Written by	Original release date
1	1	"Not So Bad Wolf"	Christian Larocque and Emma Gignac	Ron Holsey	November 18, 2022
1	1	"Chicken of the Sea"	Christian Larocque and Emma Gignac	Ron Holsey	November 18, 2022
2	2	"The Elephant of Surprise"	Christian Larocque and Emma Gignac	Ron Holsey	November 18, 2022
2	2	"The Chicken and the Egg"	Christian Larocque and Emma Gignac	Josh Riley Brown	November 18, 2022
3	3	"Hercul-easy"	Christian Larocque and Emma Gignac	Jennifer Keene	November 18, 2022
3	3	"The Lion, the Mouse and the Chicken"	Christian Larocque and Emma Gignac	Laura Kleinbaum	November 18, 2022
4	4	"Where's the Party?"	Christian Larocque and Emma Gignac	Scott Gray	November 18, 2022
4	4	"Chicken Out West"	Christian Larocque and Emma Gignac	Jessica Welsh	November 18, 2022
5	5	"Disco Chickens"	Christian Larocque and Emma Gignac	Alex Mack	November 18, 2022
5	5	"Little Red and Little Red Chicken"	Christian Larocque and Emma Gignac	Dave Polsky	November 18, 2022
6	6	"Dawn of Wonder Chicken"	Christian Larocque and Emma Gignac	Josh Riley Brown	November 18, 2022
6	6	"The Chicken Who Cried Wolf"	Christian Larocque and Emma Gignac	Lazar Saric	November 18, 2022
7	7	"Arizona Chickenstone and the Temple of the Troll"	Christian Larocque and Emma Gignac	Scott Gray	November 18, 2022
7	7	"The Chicken and the Beanstalk"	Christian Larocque and Emma Gignac	Jennifer Keene	November 18, 2022
8	8	"Dr. Chickenstein"	Christian Larocque and Emma Gignac	Tim McKeon	November 18, 2022
8	8	"The Sorcerer's Thesaurus"	Christian Larocque and Emma Gignac	Mark De Angelis	November 18, 2022
9	9	"A Chicken Carol"	Christian Larocque and Emma Gignac	Ron Holsey	December 2, 2022

=== Season 2 (2023) ===
No. overall	No. in season	Title	Directed by	Written by	Original release date
10	1	"Captain Claw's Clawsome Quest"	Christian Larocque and Emma Gignac	Laura Kleinbaum	September 29, 2023
10	1	"Cinderella's Story"	Christian Larocque and Emma Gignac	Alex Mack	September 29, 2023
11	2	"Funky Chicken"	Christian Larocque and Emma Gignac	Ron Holsey	September 29, 2023
11	2	"Hansel & Gretel and the Chicken"	Christian Larocque and Emma Gignac	Jessica Welsh	September 29, 2023
12	3	"Save the Stalk!"	Christian Larocque and Emma Gignac	Scott Gray	September 29, 2023
12	3	"Why Did the Chicken Cross the Road?"	Christian Larocque and Emma Gignac	Andrew Blanchette	September 29, 2023
13	4	"Mary Had a Little Chicken"	Christian Larocque and Emma Gignac	Josh Riley Brown	September 29, 2023
13	4	"The Princess, the Chicken, and the Pea"	Christian Larocque and Emma Gignac	Andrew Blanchette	September 29, 2023
14	5	"The Magnificent Magician of the Mailbox"	Christian Larocque and Emma Gignac	Isabel Galupo	September 29, 2023
14	5	"Once Upon a Chicken"	Christian Larocque and Emma Gignac	Jessica Welsh	September 29, 2023
15	6	"The Royal Rollercoaster"	Christian Larocque and Emma Gignac	Laura Kleinbaum	September 29, 2023
15	6	"Clucky Sinclair and the Three Bears"	Christian Larocque and Emma Gignac	Dave Polsky	September 29, 2023
16	7	"Wonder Chicken Returns"	Christian Larocque and Emma Gignac	Laura Kleinbaum	September 29, 2023
16	7	"Professor Goose Visits"	Christian Larocque and Emma Gignac	Ron Holsey	September 29, 2023
17	8	"Starting from Scratch"	Christian Larocque and Emma Gignac	Mark De Angelis	September 29, 2023
17	8	"Snow White's Seven"	Christian Larocque and Emma Gignac	Robby Hoffman	September 29, 2023

== Release ==
On August 29, 2022, Apple announced new kids and family programs for fall 2022. Which Interrupting Chicken was one of the series to be released. The first season was released on November 18, 2022. With the holiday episode which is also the season finale was released on December 2, 2022. The second season was released on September 29, 2023.

== Accolades ==
Interrupting Chicken was nominated for Outstanding Younger Voice Performer in an Animated or Preschool Animated Program for Juliet Donenfeld and Outstanding Writing for a Preschool Animated Program at the 2nd Children's and Family Emmy Awards. It is also nominated for Outstanding Preschool Animated Series at the 3rd Children's and Family Emmy Awards.
