= Children's and Family Emmy Award for Outstanding Younger Voice Performer in an Animated or Preschool Animated Program =

Award for young performer in a television series

Children's and Family Emmy Award for Outstanding Younger Voice Performer in a Preschool, Children's or Young Teen Program
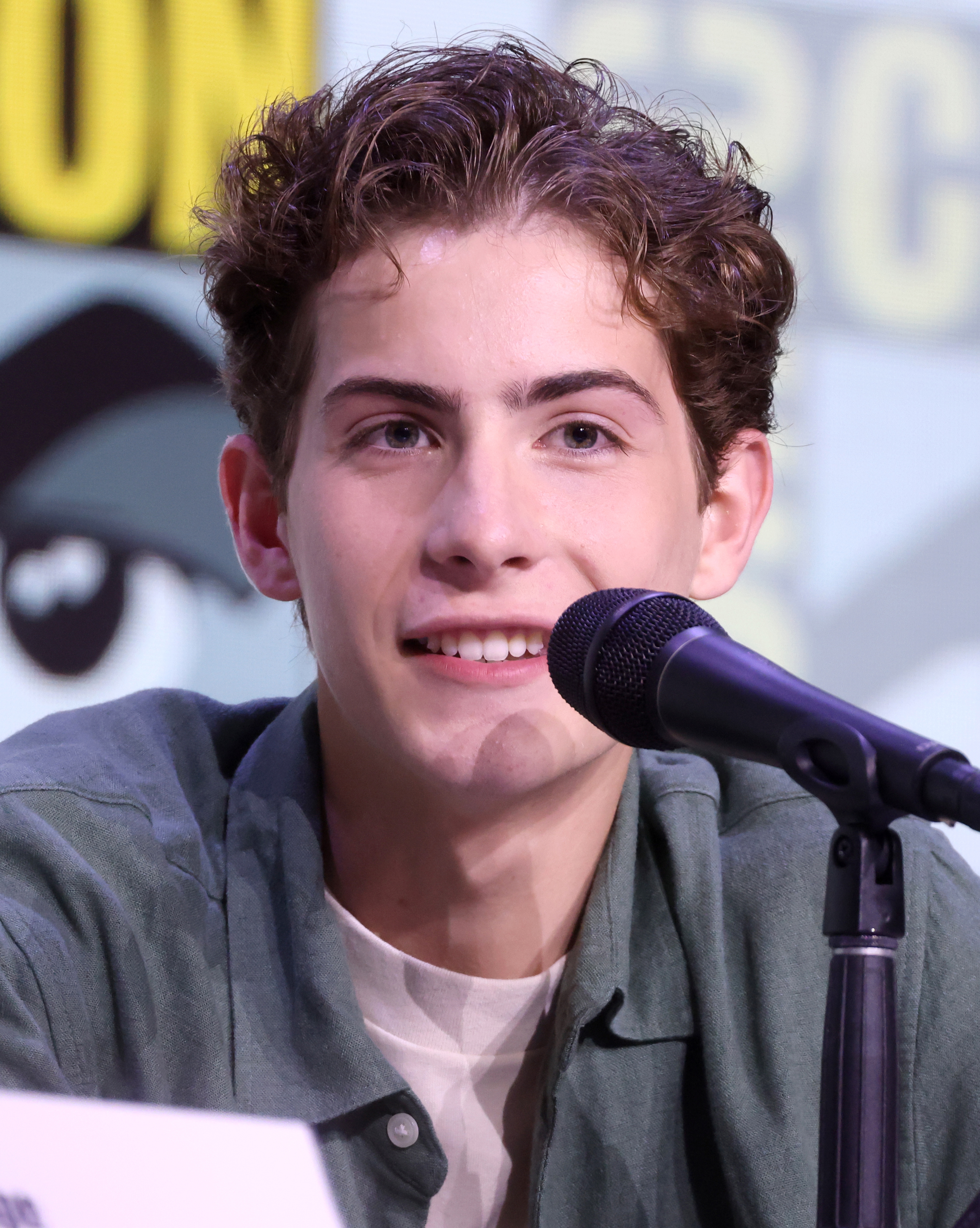
- The 2024 recipient: Jacob Tremblay
- Awarded for: Outstanding Younger Voice Performer in a Preschool, Children's or Young Teen Program
- Country: United States
- Presented by: Academy of Television Arts & Sciences
- First award: 2022
- Currently held by: Jacob Tremblay, Orion and the Dark (2024)
- Website: theemmys.tv/childrens/

The Children's and Family Emmy Award for Outstanding Younger Voice Performer in a Preschool, Children's or Young Teen Program honors performances in both television series and made-for-television/streaming films and specials. The category was established at the 1st Children's and Family Emmy Awards in 2022, and is open to lead, supporting and guest performers of all genders who are under the age of 18. The category is a counterpart to the Preschool and Children's or Young Teen categories honoring performers in animated series, and is one of two awards specifically designed to award younger actors, alongside the Younger Performer category.

The current holder of the award is Jacob Tremblay, who won at the 3rd Children's and Family Emmy Awards for his role as Orion in the Netflix streaming film Orion and the Dark.

== Background ==
On November 17, 2021, the NATAS announced the creation of the Children's and Family Emmy Awards to recognize the best in children's and family television. The organization cited an "explosive growth in the quantity and quality of children’s and family programming" as justification for a dedicated ceremony. Many categories of the awards were previously presented at the Daytime Emmy Awards. From 1995 to 2021, voice performers were honored with the Daytime Emmy Award for Outstanding Performer in an Animated Program however, this category was discontinued following the announcement of the Children's and Family Emmys.

== Winners and nominations ==
=== 2020s ===
Year	Actor	Role	Program	Network	Refs
2022 (1st)
2022 (1st)	Andy Walken	Young Durpleton	Centaurworld: Bunch O' Scrunch	Netflix	
2022 (1st)	Asher Bishop	Lincoln Loud	The Loud House	Nickelodeon	
2022 (1st)	Tucker Chandler	Alex	Madagascar: A Little Wild	Hulu and Peacock	
2022 (1st)	Kyrie McAlpin	Emma	Doug Unplugs	Apple TV+	
2022 (1st)	Amir O'Neil	Marty	Madagascar: A Little Wild	Hulu and Peacock	
2023 (2nd)
2023 (2nd)	Maria Nash	Pinecone	Pinecone & Pony: Season 2	Apple TV+	
2023 (2nd)	Talon Proc Alford	Eddy Skycedar	Spirit Rangers	Netflix	
2023 (2nd)	Juliet Donenfeld	Piper	Interrupting Chicken	Apple TV+	
2023 (2nd)	Melissa Povenmire	Gretel	Hamster & Gretel	Disney Channel	
2023 (2nd)	Isis Celilo Rogers	Summer Skycedar	Spirit Rangers	Netflix	
2023 (2nd)	Momona Tamada	Onari	ONI: Thunder God's Tale	Netflix	
2024 (3rd)
2024 (3rd)	Jacob Tremblay	Orion	Orion and the Dark	Netflix	
2024 (3rd)	Lucia Cunningham	Jessica Williams	Jessica's Big Little World	Cartoon Network	
2024 (3rd)	Simisola Gbadamosi	Tola Martins	Iwájú	Disney+	
2024 (3rd)	Terrence Little Gardenhigh	Pat	Fright Krewe	Hulu and Peacock	
2024 (3rd)	Arianna McDonald	Marcie	Snoopy Presents: One-of-a-Kind Marcie	Apple TV+	
2025 (4th)
2025 (4th)	Christopher Sean Cooper Jr.	Tate	Wonder Pets: In the City	Apple TV+	
2025 (4th)	Summer Rose Castillo	Alma	Alma's Way	PBS Kids	
2025 (4th)	Vanessa Huszar	Zuri	Wonder Pets: In the City	Apple TV+	
2025 (4th)	Chanel Stewart	Kai	Win or Lose	Disney+	
2025 (4th)	Kensington Tallman	Riley Andersen	Dream Productions	Disney+	
2025 (4th)	Alkaio Thiele	Peter Parker	Marvel's Spidey & His Amazing Friends	Disney+	
2025 (4th)	Ja'Siah Young	Dax	RoboGobo	Disney+	

== Programs with multiple nominations ==
2 nominations

- Madagascar: A Little Wild
- Spirit Rangers
- Wonder Pets: In the City

== Networks with multiple nominations ==
6 nominations

- Apple TV+

5 nominations

- Disney+/Disney Channel
- Netflix

3 nominations

- Hulu
- Peacock
