= Laura Kariuki =

American actress

- Born: June 21, 1998 (age 28); Iowa
- Occupation: Actress
- Years active: 2021–present

Laura Kariuki is an American actress. She is best known for playing Kim Williams in the reboot series The Wonder Years and JJ in the superhero drama series Black Lightning.

== Early life ==
Kariuki was born in Iowa and moved to Lenexa, Kansas at the age of 8. She graduated with a BFA in acting from Oklahoma City University. She was one of eight students selected to perform in the World Theatre Education Alliance in Beijing. Immediately after graduating, Laura was selected to participate in the 2020 ABC Discovers Showcase.

== Career ==
Kariuki made her on screen debut in the superhero drama series Black Lightning where she played JJ in a recurring role. She replaced China Anne McClain whose character was killed off, but is now reborn. In her first film role she played Maggie in the Netflix romantic drama Along for the Ride. Her biggest role yet has been playing Kim Williams in the reboot series, The Wonder Years.

She portrayed model Vivian Lee Finch in a one-off appearance on the horror series American Horror Stories. She also played a young Bob Dylans British girlfriend Becka in the biopic film A Complete Unknown.

== Filmography ==
=== Film ===
Year	Title	Role	Notes
2022	Along for the Ride	Maggie	
2024	Bitter Leaf	Mariam	Short
2024	A Complete Unknown	Becka	

=== Television ===
Year	Title	Role	Notes
2021	Black Lightning	JJ	8 episodes
2021-2023	The Wonder Years	Kim Williams	32 episodes
2023	American Horror Stories	Vivan Lee Finch	Episode; Tapeworm
