= Emma Kaye =

- Born: Harare, Zimbabwe
- Education: Oxford Brookes University
- Occupation: Internet-based project developer
- Known for: Triggerfish Animation Studios, Bozza
- Website: www.emmakaye.com

Emma Kaye is a South African entrepreneur, an advocate of mobile media and impact impact-focused business leader. She is currently the founder and CEO of Happy Hounds Pet Food and is the co-founder of the South African/Irish animation company Triggerfish Animation Studios.

Kaye has a number of business and industry ventures to her name, including the founder and CEO of the startup venture Bozza. She has attained multiple professional accolades and leading-light endorsements in the course of her evolving career.

Kaye has been named one of the Top 10 Women in Science and Technology in Africa, twice voted among the Top 50 Women Globally in Mobile Entertainment, and listed among the 20 Most Powerful Women in Technology in Africa.

== Early life and education ==
Emma Kaye was born in Harare, Zimbabwe. On completing her A'Levels she studied business, marketing and computer programming at Oxford Brookes University, England.

== Career ==
Kaye began her professional life in financial public relations and software development, before moving to film production. In 1991, she began work as a production coordinator in feature films – the first being production secretary for Bopha (directed by Morgan Freeman and featuring Danny Glover and Alfre Woodard).

In 1996 Emma co-founded Triggerfish Animation, a South African animation company, with director Jacquie Trowell. Under Kaye's leadership, Triggerfish produced award-winning commercials and seminal television programs, including Takalani Sesame, the South African version of Sesame Street. As a result of Takalani's success, Sesame Workshop commissioned Triggerfish to produce animation for their US domestic and international programming.

In order to inject sustainability into the African animation brand, she initiated the first Animation Festival at Sithengi 2002, and co-founded AnimationSA and AnimationXchange.

Emma co-produced South Africa's first animated documentary (Beyond Freedom directed by Jacqui Trowell) that was solicited by National Geographic through the All Roads Film Project. The film premiered in Los Angeles and Washington DC, screened at prestigious festivals, including Toronto, and was nominated for a Golden Bear award (Berlin).

In 2005, Kaye became CEO of Breakdesign, a mobile content studio recognised as one of the top five Flash Lite developers globally for Nokia. In April 2007 Emma left Breakdesign to continue her work in content creation, new media, mobile and entertainment, starting with the debut African mobile content and user generated mobile channels, Mobfest. In May 2007 Emma founded Gate7, a new media, content and mobility company. In July 2008, Emma pioneered and launched South Africa's first mobile text channel, Novel Idea.

In August 2013, Emma founded and launched Bozza. Bozza was an online market place for Africa's musicians and artists. Using the platform, artists could sell their work directly to their public, and create a platform for their work. The project received funding from Silicon Valley investors and was widely praised for its role in supporting African digital creators.

In 2020, Kaye launched Happy Hounds Pet Food that delivers fresh, certified dog food directly to customers in the Western Cape, South Africa. The brand is recognised for its ethical sourcing, minimal environmental footprint, and dedication to holistic pet wellness.

== Leadership and Advocacy ==
Kaye served as executive director of the Cape Digital Foundation, promoting digital inclusion and the development of Smart Townships. In 2010, she was elected as a board member of the Mobile Entertainment Forum. She is also a board member of Wiki In Africa, a non-profit working to bridge the knowledge and representation gap of Africans on Wikimedia platforms.

Kaye has presented at countless conferences across the globe to spread her thoughts, contributed to the writing of industry papers, participated in many festivals and conferences on the continent and across the globe, and set up regional SA chapters of industry bodies.
