= Red, White and Blue (2023 film) =

2023 American short film

- Promotional release poster
- Directed by: Nazrin Choudhury
- Screenplay by: Nazrin Choudhury
- Produced by: Nazrin Choudhury; Sara McFarlane; Samantha Bee
- Starring: Brittany Snow; Juliet Donenfeld; Redding Munsell
- Cinematography: Adam Suschitzky
- Edited by: Phil McLaughlin
- Music by: Peter Karr
- Production company: Majic Ink Productions
- Release dates: September 30, 2023 (Edmonton); October 15, 2023 (Hawaii)
- Running time: 24 minutes
- Country: United States
- Language: English

Red, White and Blue is a 2023 American drama short film written, directed, and produced by Nazrin Choudhury. Starring Brittany Snow and Juliet Donenfeld, it tells the story of a single mother traveling with her daughter in search of an abortion.

Red, White and Blue premiered at the Edmonton International Film Festival on September 30, 2023, where it won the Grand Jury Award for Best Live Action Short. It was nominated for Best Live Action Short Film at the 96th Academy Awards.

== Synopsis ==
Rachel, a single mother working as a waitress, urgently searches for an abortion. Because she lives in Arkansas, where abortion is effectively illegal, she travels with her preteen daughter Maddy to an abortion clinic in Illinois.

Once they arrive at the clinic, Rachel reveals that she is seeking an abortion for her daughter, not herself. A flashback implies that her daughter was sexually assaulted. The procedure is performed and the two return home; the film ends as they celebrate her daughter's birthday.

== Cast ==
- Brittany Snow as Rachel
- Juliet Donenfeld as Maddy
- Redding Munsell as Jake
- Sloan Lucas Muldown as Young Maddy

== Production ==
Written, directed, and produced by British-American filmmaker Nazrin Choudhury, Red, White and Blue was informed by Choudhury's own experience seeking an abortion when she lived in the United Kingdom. On December 7, 2023, it was announced that the film would be executive produced by Samantha Bee, who described the film as "storytelling at its best; sharp, gutting, and I pray, impactful.

== Reception ==
Red, White and Blue received largely positive reviews from critics. In a review for The New York Times, Jeannette Catsoulis named the film the "clear standout" of the year's Academy Award nominees for Best Live Action Short Film, writing, "Painstakingly constructed from small, telling details, the movie ends with the kind of sting that lingers longer than any news report." Cathy Newman of Channel 4 News described the film as "a punch to the gut", and Pete Hammond of Deadline wrote that the film carries a "stunning impact".

Collin Souter of RogerEbert.com praised Snow and Donenfeld's performances, but also wrote that the film "overstates the obvious, with a twist ending that will leave every viewer gobsmacked at the end instead of enlightened, angry or motivated to help make change."
