= Interrupting Chicken =

2010 children's book by David Ezra Stein

- Cover of Interrupting Chicken (publ. Candlewick Press)
- Author: David Ezra Stein
- Language: English
- Genre: Children's book
- Published: 2010
- Publisher: Candlewick Press
- Publication place: United States
- Pages: 40

Interrupting Chicken is a 2010 children's picture book written and illustrated by David Ezra Stein and published by Candlewick Press. Interrupting Chicken was awarded the 2011 Caldecott Honor and a New York Times Bestseller. The book was followed by two sequels Interrupting Chicken and the Elephant of Surprise (2018) and Interrupting Chicken: Cookies for Breakfast (2021).

== Background ==
When designing the chickens for Interrupting Chicken, Stein said he did “a hundred different drawings of the chicken” before he decided which one he liked the most. His idea behind Interrupting Chicken came from a childhood knock knock joke that he enjoyed.

== Characters ==
Little Red Chicken is portrayed to be quite young, very enthusiastic and energetic. She is very involved with the stories and wants what is best for the characters whilst being unable to rest while being read however appears to appreciate her father.

Papa is Little Red Chicken's father who proves to be very patient and forgiving. He seems to be quite tired throughout the story and wishes Little Red Chicken would go to bed so he could get some rest also.

== TV adaptation ==
An animated series adaptation of the book was released on Apple TV+ on November 18, 2022. The series features the voice of Sterling K. Brown as Papa and Juliet Donenfeld as Piper, the little red chicken. A holiday special was released on December 2, 2022. Season 2 was released on September 29, 2023.
