= Annie Awards for Best Limited Series =

Annual US television award

Annie Award for Best Limited Series
- Awarded for: Excellence in animated limited series
- Country: United States
- Presented by: ASIFA-Hollywood
- First award: 2022
- Currently held by: Win or Lose (2025)
- Website: annieawards.org

The Annie Award for Best Limited Series is an Annie Award given annually to the best animated television limited series, the category was first presented at the 50th Annie Awards.

According to ASIFA-Hollywood, in order to be eligible for this award, "a Limited Series animated program must have an individual episode from an animated episodic series".

== 2020s ==
Year	Program	Episode	Studios	Network
2022 (50th)
2022 (50th)	Oni: Thunder God's Tale	"The Demon Moon Rises"	Tonko House	Netflix
2022 (50th)	Baymax!	"Sofia"	Walt Disney Animation Studios	Disney+
2022 (50th)	El Deafo	"Everybody Sounds So Weird"	Lighthouse Studios	Apple TV+
2022 (50th)	HouseBroken	"Who's Having a Merry Trashmas?"	Kapital Entertainment	FOX
2022 (50th)	Undone	"Rectify"	The Tornante Company	Prime Video
2023 (51st)
2023 (51st)	Kizazi Moto: Generation Fire	"Enkai"	Triggerfish Animation Studio and Blinkink	Disney+
2023 (51st)	Only You: An Animated Shorts Collection	"Yellowbird"	Max	
2023 (51st)	Pokémon: Path to the Peak	"Episode 1"	The Pokémon Company International	
2024 (52nd)
2024 (52nd)	Dream Productions	"A Night to Remember"	Pixar Animation Studios	Disney+
2024 (52nd)	Iwájú	"Tola"	Walt Disney Animation Studios	Disney+
2024 (52nd)	Lego Star Wars: Rebuild the Galaxy	"Part Three"	Lucasfilm	Disney+
2024 (52nd)	Moon Girl's Lab	"Moon Girl Saves the Moon"	Disney Television Animation and Disney Branded Television	Disney Channel
2024 (52nd)	My Adventures with Superman	"Pierce the Heavens, Superman!"	Warner Bros. Animation	Adult Swim
2025 (53rd)
2025 (53rd)	Win or Lose	"Home"	Pixar Animation Studios	Disney+
2025 (53rd)	Asterix and Obelix: The Big Fight	"Episode III"	Banijay Productions France, Légende Films and Netflix Animation Studios	Netflix
2025 (53rd)	Eyes of Wakanda	"Into The Lion’s Den"	Marvel Studios Animation	Disney+
2025 (53rd)	Marvel Zombies	"Episode 2"	Marvel Studios Animation	Disney+
2025 (53rd)	Star Wars: Visions – Volume 3	"BLACK"	David Production	Disney+
