= Iwájú =

2024 animated miniseries

- Genre: Drama; Science fiction; Africanfuturism
- Screenplay by: Olufikayo Adeola; Halima Hudson
- Story by: Olufikayo Adeola; Hamid Ibrahim; Toluwalakin Olowofoyeku
- Directed by: Olufikayo Adeola
- Voices of: Simisola Gbadamosi; Dayo Okeniyi; Femi Branch; Siji Soetan; Weruche Opia
- Composer: Ré Olunuga
- Countries of origin: United Kingdom; United States; Nigeria
- Original languages: English; Nigerian Pidgin; Yoruba
- No. of seasons: 1
- No. of episodes: 6

Production
- Executive producers: Jennifer Lee; Byron Howard
- Producer: Christina Chen
- Running time: 17–23 minutes
- Production companies: Cinesite; Walt Disney Animation Studios; Kugali Media

Original release
- Network: Disney+
- Release: February 28, 2024

Iwájú (pronounced [ī.wá.d͡ʒú]) is an animated science fiction miniseries produced by Walt Disney Animation Studios and the Pan-African British-based entertainment company Kugali Media for the streaming service Disney+. It was written by Olufikayo Adeola and Halima Hudson from a story by Adeola, Hamid Ibrahim, and Toluwalakin Olowofoyeku and directed by Adeola, and is the first "original long-form animated series" produced by Walt Disney Animation Studios, although it ended up as the final television series produced by the studio before it shifted away from-long form content in favor of theatrical feature films. The title of the series, iwájú, roughly translates to 'the future' in the Yoruba language (literally 'front-facing'). It is an animated series set in futuristic Lagos, Nigeria, following the adventures of Tola and Kole as they navigate their different worlds, discovering secrets and facing dangers. The series combines unique visuals, tech advancements, and Lagos spirit.

The series stars Simisola Gbadamosi, Dayo Okeniyi, Femi Branch, Siji Soetan, and Weruche Opia. Originally planning a series of shorts, Walt Disney Animation Studios and Kugali Media were developing the long-form series for Disney+ by December 2020. The story draws inspiration from (and is set in) the city of Lagos, Nigeria, due to Lagos being "the culture capital of Nigeria", and due to both its mainland and island areas having "a unique, distinct feel" that the creative team felt provided "an interesting base for the story". Cinesite was announced to co-produce the series in September 2021, with pre-production already underway at Cinesite Montreal. Production began in May 2022. Animation was provided by Cinesite's Montreal and London facilities, with pre-production and storyboard supervision at Disney's Burbank and Vancouver studios. The series includes original score composed by Ré Olunuga.

Iwájú premiered on Disney+ on February 28, 2024, and consisted of six episodes.

== Voice cast ==
- Simisola Gbadamosi as Tola Martins
- Dayo Okeniyi as Tunde Martins
- Femi Branch as Bode DeSousa
- Siji Soetan as Kole Adesola
- Weruche Opia as Otin
- Toyin Oshinaike as Godspower
- Bisola Aiyeola as Happiness
- Sodiq Yusuff as Sunday Adelekan
- Francis Polo as Ejiro

== Episodes ==
All episodes are directed by Olufikayo Adeola, and have a teleplay written by Adeola and Halima Hudson, and a story written by Adeola, Hamid Ibrahim, and Toluwalakin Olowofoyeku.

No.	Title	Original release date
1	"Iwájú"	February 28, 2024
Tola Martins decides to travel alongside her family's driver, Godspower, to the city of Lagos, Nigeria on her tenth birthday, to greet her father, scientist Tunde Martins. However, Tunde reprimands Tola for traveling to the city, and shows apprehensiveness when Tola asks him to travel to his hometown, Ajegunle. Upon returning, Tunde forgets Tola's birthday and Tola meets with her friend Kole, the family's gardener, who promises to do something fun with her later. Tunde's investors, meanwhile, are concerned about delays with his project of a lizard-looking robot bodyguard and he, at their suggestion, gives it to Tola as a present upon being reminded of her birthday.
2	"Bode"	February 28, 2024
In a flashback, a younger Bode steals money from his mother's employer to buy a gold chain. In the present, it is revealed that Bode is the one behind the kidnappings. It is also revealed that Kole is an accomplice for Bode. Tola invites Kole over for dinner. When Tunde discovers this, since he does not trust Kole, he punishes Tola by sending her to bed and cancels his promise to take her to the mainland.
3	"Kole"	February 28, 2024
A flashback shows that Kole and his mother have been in debt with Bode for a long time. In the present, Kole's mother is ill as Kole takes care of her in the slums in Lagos. When Kole goes to see Bode, Bode instructs him to bring Tola to him as a hostage to get to Tunde. The following morning, Tola tricks Godspower to drive her and Kole to the mainland, as Otin, the lizard robot, tags along with them. Kole gives Tola a tour of Lagos and makes sure she does not get into any trouble as Otin watches them from afar. Otin is low on battery power and tries to find a charger, but since the shoppers mistake her for a real lizard, they keep her away from the chargers. Kole is caught by one of Bode's minions, Sunday, and Tola is cornered by another one of Bode's accomplices, Happiness, as Otin loses power trying to get to Tola.
4	"Tunde"	February 28, 2024
In a flashback, a younger Tunde goes to his job interview with Mrs. Usman at Greenwood Technology. In the present, Tunde discovers that his daughter went behind his back and went to the mainland after seeing Otin is offline there, and receives a ransom call from Bode. Tola is held hostage at Bode's lair and acts nicely toward Bode and his accomplices, but Bode catches on to her manipulations. Godspower brings Kole's mother to the Martins' residence for her protection. A little girl attempts to take Otin, who attaches her tail to her watch so she can charge. Tunde travels to the mainland to find Tola, but his old police friend of his does not want to help him. Bode raises the ransom after finding out Tunde went to the police. Kole hides from Sunday in a junkyard, but he finds him. Otin, now fully charged comes to Kole's rescue, and asks him where Tola is.
5	"Otin"	February 28, 2024
Otin explains to Kole she was made to protect Tola. Otin attempts to interrogate Sunday about Tola's location, but he is immediately frightened by her. Tunde finds Kole, who tells him everything he knows about Bode. Tola attempts to reach a phone, but she is always caught by Bode and Happiness before she can. Bode reveals to Tola that Kole has been working for him. Otin reunites with Tola, who learns of her robotic nature. Otin explains that her ìjà mode (fight mode) can further protect her, but it cannot function due to her faulty battery. Kole plays Bode a recording of him confessing being behind the kidnappings. This makes Bode on edge. While on the phone with Bode, Tunde is taken away by Bode's men and Kole is thrown into Tola's cell.
6	"Tola"	February 28, 2024
In a flashback, Tunde introduces Tola to Kole. In the present, Tola, still hurt by his betrayal, refuses to speak to Kole. Bode tells Tunde he wants his name removed from Greenwood Tech's system, but Tunde says he cannot do it from a non-secure server, so Bode and his accomplices take everyone back to the island. Godspower and Kole's mother hide from Bode and his gang when they get to the house. Kole discovers how to fix Otin's battery and ìjà mode. Tola uses her manipulation to trick the sentries into taking her into her father's office so she can get a charger for Otin. Godspower uses the car alarm and Kole's mother fakes unconsciousness to get the attention of the other lackeys. Tola and Kole fight Sunday, and Tola contacts Mrs. Usman. Otin, now fully charged and repaired, goes into ìjà mode to fight Happiness. Bode reveals his reasonings for the kidnappings, unaware that Tola is using her father's electronic glasses to livestream his monologue all over Lagos, attracting the police to the island. Happiness grows disgusted at Bode's self-centered confession and refuses to help him avoid being arrested. Tunde and Tola reconcile and Kole considers studying technology.

== Production ==
=== Development ===
Walt Disney Animation Studios chief creative officer Jennifer Lee read an article on BBC about Kugali Media, a British-based company founded by African artists, saying that they wanted to "kick Disney's arse". Intrigued by the company's desire to create and tell African stories, she approached them to develop together an original long-form science fiction animated project for The Walt Disney Company's streaming service, Disney+. The producers originally planned to create a series of shorts, but "each idea was an epic feature", so they chose to create a series instead.

On December 10, 2020, Lee announced that Walt Disney Animation Studios and Kugali Media would be co-producing a new original animated series for Disney+, titled Iwájú. It is Walt Disney Animation Studios' first original animated series, as most of Disney's television projects—original or based on pre-existing IP—are produced by Disney Television Animation. She described the collaboration between both companies as a "first of its kind collaboration". The show is directed by Olufikayo Adeola. The title of the series, iwájú, roughly translates to 'the future' in the Yoruba language (literally 'front-facing').

In February 2021, the Kugali Media team said that the series is not like World of Wakanda, with Kugali Media CEO Ziki Nelson saying they "took a real African city" (Lagos, Nigeria) and found ways to adapt it using their imagination, with Hamid Ibrahim, the creative director, clarifying that Disney Animation let them "be ourselves and...be true to ourselves," working with Disney with "a certain amount of autonomy and creative freedom". SYFY said this could "open the doors for other post-pandemic collaborations around the world". Toluwalakin "Tolu" Olowofoyeku, chief technology officer of Kugali, is a creative consultant and consulting producer on the show, and Nelson wrote the story. In June 2021, Nelson, as he was signed to a talent management company, added that "storytelling through art and animation" has been his dream.

At the 2021 Annecy International Animation Film Festival, Olowofoyeku said that the story was inspired by the city of Lagos, Nigeria, due to Lagos being "the culture capital of Nigeria", and due to both its mainland and island areas having "a unique, distinct feel" that the creative team felt provided "an interesting base for the story". Nelson said that the series would be an "opportunity to give people a more holistic view of Nigeria" though it's a "strange but wonderful city". Producers worked with several nations for the series, with visual effects director Marlon West saying that members of the team were hired from several departments, while head of story Natalie Nourigat described having a "virtual story room" composed of both Kugali and Disney employees as "a great way to introduce new people".

Lee and Byron Howard served as executive producers, while Christina Chen produced. The series consisted of 6 episodes.

=== Writing ===
The series was written by Adeola and Halima Hudson. Adeola and the Kugali team first conceived the overall story, character arcs, and episodes, with the team being given complete creative freedom by Disney, allowing them to incorporate darker subject matters into the story. Hudson, a writer for Disney Animation, was later brought to work on the script in order to add humor and keep focus on the story and arcs. Regarding the series' portrayal of Lagos, the writers decided to make authentic to real life, albeit slightly exaggerated and adding futuristic elements to the city; production designer Hamid Ibrahim said they wanted to focus on Lagos' day-to-day life. Each episode's opening focuses on a different character, an idea implemented at the suggestion of Nelson.

Adeola wanted the series to depict Nigeria "100 years in the future" while still presenting issues from real-life Nigeria, as he wanted the series to serve as a reflection of real-life Nigeria, so he drew inspiration from his life growing up in Lagos. He particularly found the segregation between the rich and the poor to be a strong foundation for a science fiction story; Adeola also felt exploring Lagos through a science fiction story allowed the series to heighten some of the city's elements in an entertaining way. While the series explores inequality, it is also an "aspirational tale", as Adeola sees hope as "really important to the human spirit". He ultimately wanted Iwájú to be a story about challenging the status quo by exploring real-life issues through the eyes of an optimistic character, which is reflected by how Tola reacts to learning of Kole's struggles and how life in mainland Lagos is.

=== Animation ===
Animation was handled in Cinesite's Montreal and London facilities, while pre-production and storyboarding took place at Disney Animation's Burbank and Vancouver studios. Hamid Ibrahim, the creative director of Kugali, is the production designer for the show. Ibrahim said that the show's animation style would differ from previous Disney productions, with Nelson saying that it would instead be inspired by African, Eastern, and Western animation styles, and visual effects director Marlon West adding that it would still have the same quality as other Disney projects. Ibrahim also said that the towers composing the mainland, which is the series' main setting, are meant to represent overcrowding, while the island area contains a bigger "space and room for creative expression". He added that technology is a crucial aspect of the setting, with the series featuring several advanced technologies, such as augmented reality glasses substituting smartphones and spherical flying cars.

=== Music ===
Ré Olunuga had recorded the score for the series by January 2024. The soundtrack, which includes authentic African-influenced music, was released on March 1, 2024, two days after the series premiere.

== Themes ==
Iwájú explores themes of inequality and class divide, which director and Kugali co-founder Ziki Nelson described as "the everyday reality of life in Nigeria and other parts of the world". It also explores how those issues affect everyday society, as well as "challenging the status quo". Nelson also described the show as about "inspiration, or aspiration and desire, to try and engineer society for living in a more positive way". Ibrahim also argued that the series represents a "personal childhood dream of mine to tell my story and that of my people".

== Release ==
Iwájú was originally set to debut in 2022, exclusively on Disney's streaming service, Disney+. The series was later delayed to 2023, before ultimately being delayed to February 28, 2024. The show made its linear debut on February 2, 2026 on Disney Channel, with Disney XD following shortly thereafter. It also aired in 2024 on Disney Channel Africa, due to the Disney+ service not being launched in the region at that time.

=== Marketing ===
Concept art for the series was shown at the 2021 Annecy International Animation Film Festival, where the crew discussed the series. The series was described by Ibrahim as a "Kugali–Disney mash-up," a collaboration between both companies, to which Jennifer Lee, the chief creative officer of Walt Disney Animation Studios, agreed, while Olowofoyeku said the show had a "very unique set-up for storytelling already built into the DNA of the real-life Lagos". Additionally, Nelson said the show's creative team built "a futuristic world rooted in the contemporary setting". In December 2021, at the Investors Day for Disney, details about the show's characters and plot were revealed.

A behind-the-scenes documentary series was developed at ABC News Studios, a division of ABC News. The documentary, titled Iwájú: A Day Ahead, was directed by Megan Harding with Amy Astley and Beth Hoppe executive producing, and released alongside the series on February 28, 2024. A mobile game, titled Disney Iwájú: Rising Chef and developed by Maliyo Games alongside Disney Games and Kugali, also released on February 28, 2024, on Android and iOS.

== Reception ==
=== Pre-release ===
LuxeKurves Magazine praised the series for featuring "black African characters written and created by an African team," describing it as Afrofuturist. BBC News noted that the series will be the first time that Disney "will work with African storytellers to create an animated series set on the continent", implying the series is Afrofuturist. Business Insider said that the series is "set in a Wakanda-like world", while IOL called the series "steeped in science fiction". Native Magazine said the series will "highlight poignant West African stories told through animation and comic-book format," saying it is very important at a time with continued police brutality and government corruption in Nigeria, and will "further cement the talent of African creatives on a global scale," with a story told through "African lenses". Tor.com described the series as Africanfuturist and said that by partnering with Disney, Kugali Media can "reach an ever broader audience, bringing their message around the globe". Jade King of TheGamer described the series as charming, gorgeous, and depicting a world "filled with depth" and called it "unflinchingly authentic in spite of its colourful presentation." Alexander Onukwue of Semafor called the series a "very optimistic" look at Lagos in the future, with subtext for adults to ingest, generic Nigerian accents, and an "influential cast with a strong fanbase," but noted that Disney+ isn't available in Nigeria.

=== Critical response ===
The series was positively received. Bill Desowitz of IndieWire praised the series and said that the series' animation "boasted a mixture of African, Eastern, and Western animation styles." Rupali Manohar Chauhan of Meaww argued that the series had "striking visuals and deeply ingrained African references," and said that the series mixed powerful graphics with "intriguing narration" and argued that the series proves the adage of "good triumphs over evil" in the series finale. Nick Valdez of ComicBook.com called the series a "very intriguing project." Kambole Campbell of Empire praised the cultural specificity, use of Yoruba-language phrases, strong voice cast, and exploration of income inequality, imagines abuse of today's technology, art direction, costume design, thoughtful, and called the series "pretty bold children’s television." However, Campbell said the series doesn't have the "explosive inventiveness" of Kizazi Moto: Generation Fire, the noticeable genetic elements, a subpar score, and stuttering narrative with pacing "shackled to the binge model" by favoring a long story rather than one-off episodes, and notes that early episodes are "a little slow," arguing the series feels like a "feature film that’s been unceremoniously divided into slices." Charles Mudede of The Stranger said that the story does not have a Western structure, and has a happy ending, but one that is strange "by the standards of Disney animations," argued that Bole is not good at "being a villain," and described the series as realistic. He also argued that the series was closer "to cyberpunk than Afrofuturism" because of the depiction of advanced technology, and said that the world depicted in the series is "down to earth and pushed and pulled by capitalism."

Nick Bythrow of Screen Rant praised the series for standing out with "themes of class and charming characters," stellar animation, social commentary, and strong voice acting, but criticized inconsistent pacing, a predictable story, and some weak supporting character arcs. Leila Latif of The Guardian called the series a "delightful coming-of-age adventure" with great voice acting and background art, and called it an "encouraging step into a bold and brilliant future" but criticized it for being "frantically paced and hard to follow." Petrana Radulovic of Polygon praised the series as having a fascinating world, tight story, and compelling story, and called it "one of the most exciting shows" to come out on Disney+ and "one of the best animated shows on the streaming service," called it "short...but it packs a punch," and hoped that Disney did similar projects in the future.

It was also reported that the series amassed a "devoted following" on social media, including on Twitter, appreciating the social commentary of the series, noting the use of Nigerian Pidgin, and urged people to watch it.

=== Accolades ===
Award	Date of Ceremony	Category	Nominee(s)	Result	Ref.
Annie Awards	February 8, 2025	Best Limited Series	"Tola"	Nominated	
Black Reel TV Awards	August 13, 2024	Outstanding Production Design	Hamid Ibrahim	Nominated	
Children's and Family Emmy Awards	March 15, 2025	Outstanding Children's or Young Teen Animated Series	Iwájú	Nominated	
Children's and Family Emmy Awards	March 15, 2025	Outstanding Younger Voice Performer in an Animated or Preschool Animated Program	Simisola Gbadamosi	Nominated	
Children's and Family Emmy Awards	March 15, 2025	Outstanding Directing for an Animated Program	Olufikayo Adeola (for "Kole")	Nominated	
NAACP Image Awards	February 22, 2025	Outstanding Animated Series	Iwájú	Nominated	
