= Win or Lose (miniseries) =

2025 Pixar series

- Genre: Coming-of-age; Comedy drama; Sports
- Created by: Carrie Hobson; Michael Yates
- Written by: Carrie Hobson; Michael Yates
- Voices of: Will Forte; Rosie Foss; Josh Thomson; Milan Ray; Rosa Salazar; Dorien Watson; Izaac Wang; Chanel Stewart
- Music by: Ramin Djawadi; CAMPFIRE
- Country of origin: United States
- Original language: English
- No. of episodes: 8

Production
- Executive producers: Lindsey Collins; Andrew Stanton; Pete Docter; Michael Yates; Carrie Hobson; David Lally
- Producers: David Lally; Max Sachar
- Cinematography: Patrick Lin; Brian Boyd
- Animators: Brendan Beesley; Brandon Kern; Tom Zach
- Editors: Gregory Amundson; Jason Hudak; Robert Grahamjones; Ayşe Dedeoğlu Arkali
- Running time: 22−33 minutes
- Production company: Pixar Animation Studios

Original release
- Network: Disney+
- Release: February 19 – March 12, 2025

Win or Lose is an American animated sports comedy television miniseries created by Carrie Hobson and Michael Yates for the streaming service Disney+. It is the first original series produced by Pixar Animation Studios. The series revolves around a co-ed middle school softball team called the Pickles in the week leading up to their big championship game, with each episode showing the perspective of each member of the team.

The series' voice cast includes Will Forte, Rosie Foss, Josh Thomson, Milan Ray, Rosa Salazar, Dorien Watson, Izaac Wang, and Chanel Stewart. Pixar started development on Win or Lose shortly following the creation of Disney+, with the idea originating from conversations Hobson and Yates had during production on Toy Story 4 (2019). The television show format allowed for different character perspectives and more experimentation than a traditional Pixar film. The musical score was composed by Ramin Djawadi.

Win or Lose premiered on Disney+ on February 19, 2025, and consisted of eight episodes released weekly in groups of two until March 12. It began airing on the Disney Channel on June 7, 2025. It received positive reviews from critics, although Disney's decision to remove scenes explicitly confirming a character as being transgender was criticized. The series was nominated for several awards including eight at the Children's and Family Emmy Awards (winning five) and six at the Annie Awards (winning three).

== Synopsis ==
Win or Lose follows a group of interconnected stories centered around a co-ed middle school softball team called the Pickles, over the course of the week leading up to their big championship game. Each episode focuses on a central character—either a member of the Pickles or one of their loved ones or acquaintances—whose life begins falling apart during the given week, causing their anxieties, insecurities, and coping mechanisms to internally manifest in vivid imaginations that they hide from others in their lives.

== Voice cast and characters ==
=== Main ===
- Will Forte as Coach Dan, the coach of the Pickles and Laurie's father. His anxieties manifest in him inflating and deflating different parts of his body, while his coping mechanism takes the form of a glass dome encompassing the softball field.
- Rosie Foss as Laurie, the Pickles' right fielder, Coach Dan's daughter, and Rochelle's best friend. Her anxiety manifests as an imaginary "friend" named Sweaty that constantly talks down to her.
- Josh Thomson as Frank Brown, the umpire of the softball games and a teacher at the school that several Pickles players attend. His coping mechanism manifests as a suit of blue armor inspired by his love of fantasy novels.
- Milan Ray as Rochelle Kiana Rodriguez, the Pickles' catcher and Laurie's best friend who also runs the softball field's concession stand. Her coping mechanism manifests as her imagining herself as an adult businesswoman, born from a need to make money to support her struggling family, while her anxieties manifest as gravity warping around her.
- Rosa Salazar as Vanessa Rodriguez, Rochelle's single mother who works multiple jobs, including as an influencer. Her coping mechanism is a collection of anthropomorphic hearts representing her social media likes and followers.
- Dorien Watson as Ira, Taylor's younger brother. His coping mechanism is imagining different fantastical scenarios through a cardboard tube to make up for his lack of friends.
- Izaac Wang as Yuwen Wang, the Pickles' pitcher, Kai's best friend, and Taylor's eventual boyfriend. His insecurities manifest as a miniature paper diorama cut-out of himself, dubbed "Little Yuwen", who lives in his heart, while simultaneously projecting an arrogant and self-centered external personality.
- Chanel Stewart as Kai, the Pickles' highly talented center fielder (later shortstop) and Yuwen's best friend. Her coping mechanism manifests in an ability to hover above the ground in pure joy, while her anxieties sink her into the ground, sometimes completely under the surface. Although Kai was written as a trans character and voiced by a trans actress, there is no verbal mention of the term in the show; nevertheless, implications of her transition and gender dysphoria remain in episode 7.

=== Supporting ===
- Ian Chen as Junn, one of the Pickles.
- Jo Firestone as Sweaty, a sweaty monster that Laurie hallucinates.
- Erin Keif as:
  - Lena, a local coffee barista and Frank's friend.
  - Kerin, a member of the PTA with short blond hair and glasses.
- Lil Rel Howery as James, Kai's father.
- Melissa Villaseñor as Veronica, a snobby friend of Vanessa's, the head of the PTA and the mother of Luciana.
- Flula Borg as Francis, the school janitor.
- Kyliegh Curran as Taylor, the Pickles' shortstop, Ira's older sister and Yuwen's girlfriend.
- Jaylin Fletcher as "Chicken-Kev", a chicken-themed mascot and one of the Bleacher Creatures.
- Tom Law as Tom, the Pickles' first baseman and Rochelle and Kai's slow-witted classmate.
- Romi Rey Herrada as Luciana, the Pickles' third base player who hides her eyes behind her pink hair, and the daughter of Veronica.
- Reagan To as Hannah, the Pickles' second base player.
- Akira Evans as Terrence, the Pickles' husky short stop with the black rim glasses.
- Winston Vengapally as Borna, left fielder for the Pickles with conjunctivitis in his left eye.
- Beck Nolan as Brian Dyson, a shady teenager and one of the Bleacher Creatures.
- Jenna Ann as Rinna, Brian's accomplice and one of the Bleacher Creatures.
- Orion Tran as "Little Yuwen", an imaginary representation of Yuwen's heart.
- Rhea Seehorn as Carole, Laurie's mother and Dan's ex-wife.
- Emily Ricks as Paula, Laurie's sister.
- Vyvan Pham as Monica Park, Frank's ex-girlfriend.
- Harlow Hodges as Zane, Rochelle's baby brother.
- Santina Muha as Cheryl, who runs the concession stand with Rochelle.
- Scott Menville as Random Dave, a member of the PTA who wears a T-shirt with a microphone on it. It is revealed in "Home" that he does not have a kid on the team, and he only comes for the games as he enjoys the sport.
- Dylan Buccieri as Odo, a young blonde boy who drinks orange soda and acts as a narrator and an oracle.

== Episodes ==
All episodes are written by Carrie Hobson and Michael Yates.

No.	Title	Directed by	Featured character	Original release date	Disney Channel air date
1	"Coach's Kid"	Carrie Hobson & Michael Yates	Laurie	February 19, 2025	June 7, 2025
Laurie, the right fielder of the Pickles, suffers from anxiety as she tries to impress her father, Coach Dan, amid his recent divorce. However, she is terrible at softball and has been unable to reach base or catch all season. Her insecurities manifest as an imaginary sweat-like creature called Sweaty, which constantly distracts her. Laurie spends the week overworking herself training for the championship, but her self-doubt increases, especially after she accidentally injures Kai, the Pickles' center fielder and best player, during batting practice in front of her father, causing Sweaty to grow to massive size, which weighs Laurie down. During the game, her father sees her discomfort, and he calls a timeout. They have a talk that makes her realize that while she may be bad at softball, she can still contribute, allowing her to finally get rid of Sweaty. However, as she embraces her newfound confidence, Laurie gets hit by the ball.
2	"Blue"	Carrie Hobson & Michael Yates	Frank	February 19, 2025	June 7, 2025
Frank Brown, the softball league's umpire and a teacher at the school, prides himself on his accuracy and ability to take criticism (represented by him wearing an imaginary blue suit of armor), but has been facing problems with social skills ever since breaking up with his girlfriend and fellow teacher, Monica Park, for being unable to commit to marriage. At the insistence of Francis, the school's janitor, he reluctantly starts using a dating app, visually represented as a role-playing video game. He finds a connection with another woman, but an encounter with Monica and interrogative parent-teacher conference with Vanessa regarding Rochelle cheating on a test indirectly convinces him to reconcile with Monica. However, Frank finds Monica engaged to someone else, which causes him to be heartbroken and distracted during the championship game.
3	"Raspberry"	Carrie Hobson & Michael Yates	Rochelle	February 26, 2025	June 14, 2025
Rochelle, the Pickles' catcher, comes from a financially-struggling family, not helped by her social media influencer mother, Vanessa. In addition to being a straight-A student, Rochelle works part-time at the concession stand in order to earn enough money to pay the fee for her to play softball again next year; when working like this, she transforms into an imaginary older businesswoman version of herself. When she finds out that the fee has gone up by $600 and is due by next Saturday, Rochelle hides this from Vanessa and resorts to taking bribes from her peers to help them cheat in their homework, resulting in her unintentionally getting herself and Kai in trouble with Frank while trying to help Tom, the Pickles' first baseman, cheat on a test. Rochelle evades blame when Vanessa talks about her actions when she confronts her but is scorned by her when Rochelle voices her disapproval of her mother quitting her job to become an influencer, leaving her defeated. Still $200 short, she tries to sell new cleats Vanessa bought for her online but must travel to the outskirts of town to deliver them the day of the championship game. She later realizes that she does not have her phone and finds herself at a high school party where she meets the buyers, a trio of juvenile delinquents consisting of the team's mascot "Chicken-Kev", Rinna, and leader Brian, aka the "Bleacher Creatures". They confess they actually want the keys to the concession stand to steal from it and will give her the money later. Rochelle escapes with Chicken-Kev giving chase in a car. She eventually loses her keys to Chicken-Kev. Lost, Rochelle runs to a payphone and calls her mother.
4	"Pickle"	Carrie Hobson & Michael Yates	Vanessa	February 26, 2025	June 14, 2025
Vanessa, the mother of Rochelle and infant Zane, is struggling in her role as a single parent; Zane's biting gets him kicked out of daycare and her boss fires her when she leaves work to check on Zane. She finds comfort in her social media followers, represented by an imaginary group of hearts, and in Rochelle. Not telling Rochelle about her situation, Vanessa secures other jobs with a ridesharing company and at a women-centric gym and teaches Zane to learn to play more gently. However, Frank calls Vanessa to inform her that Rochelle helped Kai cheat on a test, which Rochelle evades blame, but after their parent-teacher conference, and an encounter with the PTA, Vanessa realizes Rochelle lied and begins to feel insecure regarding Rochelle's integrity and ends up accidentally stealing Rochelle's phone to see who she has been helping cheat. Finding Tom's profile, she confronts him in person ahead of the championship game and finds out that Rochelle has been using secret alternate accounts to advertise her business of helping the other students cheat for money, eventually finding out that she is going to sell the new shoes she bought for her. Pleading with her followers to help her find her daughter, they manage to join together to identify one of the buyers, Brian, and spot Rochelle at the party. Vanessa storms into the party to retrieve her, but after venting about her motherhood struggles to some teenage girls, she finds out that Rochelle had left. She gets a phone call from Rochelle and goes to retrieve her, and tells her that they need to talk about what has been going on.
5	"Steal"	Michael Yates & Carrie Hobson	Ira	March 5, 2025	June 21, 2025
Ira, the younger brother of the Pickles' shortstop Taylor, is bored at his sister's softball game, so he uses his imagination to liven it up by looking through cardboard tube telescope. When Taylor begins dating the Pickles' pitcher Yuwen, Ira meets the Bleacher Creatures, who convince him to pull off a heist job at the concession stand. He uses his imagination to make them look like heroes on an adventure to avoid guilt. The night of the championship, Ira and the Bleacher Creatures go to the teen party, but Ira begins to feel guilty about what he did. After Rochelle escapes from their attempt to get her keys to the concession stand, Brian breaks Ira's cardboard tube telescope in a fit of anger, upsetting him and sending him home. Before the championship game, Ira attempts to tell Taylor what happened, but has no sympathy, having had a fight with Yuwen. Ira attempts to makes things right by bringing some of the stolen Swedish Fish back to the concession stand, promising to bring more, but Brian apologizes and offers to resume their friendship.
6	"Mixed Signals"	Trevor Jimenez & Chris Sasaki	Yuwen	March 5, 2025	June 21, 2025
Yuwen portrays himself as overconfident and snarky, but his heart, represented by an imaginary paper craft diorama character named "Little Yuwen", shows his deeply insecure side. After showing Laurie a humiliating video remix of her that he created, Rochelle claims he likes Laurie. In a panic, he blurts out his crush on Taylor, who returns his affection, and they go out. As time goes on, Taylor and Yuwen become inseparable, and Yuwen shows Taylor how to be a catcher. Yuwen then opens up to Taylor and shows her his "Little Yuwen" and Taylor likewise shows him her own "Little Taylor", and together, the two move in and build up their own heart diorama twice as big, making Yuwen more kindhearted. However, Yuwen becomes insecure when he sees Taylor talking to Tom and makes a joke about his intelligence, which offends Taylor. The night of the championship, Yuwen and Taylor's fight affects the game and with Rochelle missing, Taylor fills in as catcher. Yuwen intentionally ignores Taylor's signals and hits her with the ball. Having had enough of his attitude, Taylor breaks up with Yuwen and leaves the game altogether, which breaks the diorama in half, burying Little Yuwen, and leaving Yuwen brokenhearted and paralyzed on the field as the Tots, the away team, run the bases.
7	"I Got It"	Michael Yates & Carrie Hobson	Kai	March 12, 2025	June 28, 2025
One year before the championship game, Kai and her father, James, move to Peak's Valley to live with her grandmother. Kai notices a softball team practicing on the field and decides to join. This upsets James, who used to play college baseball and hoped that Kai would as well but respects her choice, expecting her to be at her best. One year later, Kai becomes the star player for the Pickles, but her father's standards for her make her doubt herself; her state of mind is represented by her floating in midair from praise and sinking into the ground from pressure. To pick herself up after getting caught cheating, Kai helps Laurie train but sprains her ankle after getting hit by a ball Laurie hit, but she keeps this hidden as her father scolds her. After Taylor leaves the championship game, Kai has Tom catch the ball at home moving to the final inning. After Laurie gets a walk, Kai hits the ball to the outfield but hobbles her ankle further.
8	"Home"	Lou Hamou-Lhadj, Carrie Hobson & Michael Yates	Coach Dan	March 12, 2025	June 28, 2025
Coach Dan takes great pride in his team and being a role model for Laurie, envisioning the softball field as a glass dome home for the team; however, his anxieties are reflecting by the imaginary inflating and deflating of his body. After winning a game, Coach Dan is confronted by the PTA who tell him they intend to replace him with James as coach. Dan tries to keep his anger in check, but struggles with James' persistent attempts to interfere and his divorce creating a rift between him and Laurie. At the championship game, Kai's hit splits the outfield. Laurie scores and ties the game, but Kai overshoots herself due to James pushing her and her injury dragging her down, and when sliding for home, Frank calls her out. The resulting argument over the call between Frank, James, and Dan causes Frank to snap and eject Dan. Outraged, Dan begins to have a temper tantrum and inflates like a blimp, causing the dome to shatter and everyone's insecurities begin to manifest, while the PTA starts a riot against Frank. Meanwhile, Ira realizes the Bleacher Creatures intend to steal the concession stand's cash box; he takes it from them and runs, and Taylor - who actually left the game when she heard Ira call for help - rescues him. Rochelle and Vanessa return to the game, the former attempting to help Laurie calm Dan down and the latter coming to Frank's aid. James finds Kai, who sunk under the field, and tells her she is more than enough and apologizes to her for not saying it sooner, while "Little Yuwen" revives and reinvigorates Yuwen. The Pickles attempt to bring Dan back down to Earth, with Laurie finally calming him down by reminding him it is only a game. As reality is restored, Dan apologizes to Frank for his outburst, Vanessa flirts with Frank after he saves Zane from choking, and Taylor makes amends with Ira, as well as Yuwen as they agree to remain friends. The game continues into extra innings with Laurie as manager; the outcome is not revealed as the Pickles happily eat at a pizzeria. When they depart, Laurie tells her father she is thinking of quitting softball.

== Production ==
=== Development ===
In December 2020, during Disney's Investor Day meeting, Pixar announced an original series titled Win or Lose for its parent company Disney's streaming service, Disney+. Carrie Hobson and Michael Yates were announced to be creating, writing, and directing from an idea they conceived, while David Lally was announced to be producing the project. Pixar's chief creative officer Pete Docter stated; "It's not so much about softball as it is a comedy about love, rivalry, and the challenges we all face in our struggles to win at life". The series would consist of episodes that each run approximately 20 minutes long. When working on Toy Story 4 (2019), Hobson and Yates realized that they had different interpretations of how their creative meetings went, so they used these differing interpretations to develop the idea of an animated series revolving around one event but with each character having their own conflicts surrounding the event. Hobson explained that Win or Lose has all the humor and heart of a Pixar feature film, but with a different type of storytelling. She also stated: "It's less of a Rashomon and more... You think you know a character, and then you pull back the curtain and reveal they have their own thing going on". Hobson and Yates also executive-produced the series alongside Lally, Docter, Andrew Stanton, and Lindsey Collins.

Win or Lose is Pixar's first series not to be based upon an existing property, as most of Pixar's television projects are based upon an existing property and usually short-form. Pixar began considering developing a TV series following the creation of Disney+. Yates and Hobson said one of the reasons a TV show format was selected for the series was the idea of experimenting with the format and longer storytelling, particularly regarding character perspectives, as well as a love for television. Another reason was how television would allow Pixar to do things a feature film format would not allow to. Hobson and Yates noted they both had to learn how to work on an episodic format. In July 2023, Lally confirmed on Twitter that post-production for the series was completed.

=== Writing ===
According to Hobson and Yates, a major theme on the series is how things are not as they seem, and seeing things from different perspectives, particularly how people in one place can have different experiences. Each episode centers on a different character; characters are first introduced in a different episode, after which their episode further explores the said character after the perception first given in their debut. Hobson said the characters were inspired by her and Yates, as well as by people they have met through their lives and their own experiences.

=== Casting ===
At the September 2022 D23 Expo, it was announced that Will Forte would voice the lead character Coach Dan, ahead of a first look image released on the same day. Forte's voice performance as Coach was inspired by Robin Williams as the Genie from Disney Animation's Aladdin (1992). Yates said, "Will was constantly improvising. It was an overflow of great stuff. The hardest part was having a five-minute scene with constant belly laughs and having to get it to three minutes!" In June 2023, at the Annecy International Animation Film Festival, Milan Ray and Rosa Salazar joined the voice cast. At the August 2024 D23 fan event, Ian Chen, Izaac Wang, Jo Firestone, Josh Thomson, Erin Keif, and Rosie Foss were announced as part of the voice cast. In January 2025, Dorien Watson, Lil Rel Howery, Flula Borg, Kyliegh Curran, Jaylin Fletcher, Tom Law, Beck Nolan, Orion Tran, and Rhea Seehorn were revealed as part of the voice cast.

=== Controversies ===
In December 2024, The Hollywood Reporter announced that a storyline regarding a transgender character, Kai, in Win or Lose had been cut. THR noted "A source close to Win or Lose said the studio made the decision to alter course several months ago." A Disney spokesperson stated, "When it comes to animated content for a younger audience, we recognize that many parents would prefer to discuss certain subjects with their children on their own terms and timeline." While Kai remains in the series, lines of dialogue that referenced gender identity were cut. Chanel Stewart, the openly transgender actress who voices Kai, criticized the decision, saying she was told that while she would still be a part of the show, the character she was playing would now be straight and cisgender. In addition, since the character of Laurie identified as Christian, some speculated that her character was conceived this way - and in turn, Kai's character altered to cisgender - in order to conform with conservative political ideologies. The episode that focuses on Kai, "I Got It", was not screened in advance to critics, but includes implications that the character is transgender, such as dressing masculine and having a masculine hairstyle at the start of her episode, growing out her hair and adopting a more feminine look over the course of a timeskip montage, hiding photos of her younger self that look more masculine, and her catcher's mitt having an old name that was ripped out, eventually being replaced by "Kai" in new stitching. Following the premiere of the episode, Pixar was additionally criticized for hiding pro-trans comments condemning the removal of Kai's transgender storyline on posts promoting the series on social media.

Following the release of Win or Lose, news outlets commented on the similarities between the text logos of the series' Pickles team and the Portland Pickles, leading to some accusations of copyright infringement. In May 2025, the team filed a trademark infringement lawsuit against The Walt Disney Company, and the parties subsequently reached a settlement.

It was later reported by the San Francisco Chronicle, in March 2026, that Pete Docter, chief creative officer of Pixar, had ordered the removal of the transgender storyline from Win or Lose while Elio (2025) was being reworked.

=== Animation ===
Mark C. Harris (directing animator of Cars 3) and Gini Cruz Santos (supervising animator of Coco) served as the animation supervisors on the series, while Kevin Andrus and Stefan Schumacher served as directing animators on the series, with Lucas Fraga Pacheco also serving as directing animator for five episodes. Animation was provided by the artist crew that worked on feature films. Win or Lose used more animators than a feature film. The series made heavy use of visual metaphors, with some characters featuring multiple metaphors. In each episode, the animation style appears to shift, further distinguishing itself. For example, Yuwen's story appears to mimic a cardboard diorama, and the actual softball footage mimics that of a traditional sports anime. This was made in order to visualize each character's perspective. The production team worked closely with the animators in order to define how each character would move in a way that showcases their characterization. The series also made use of 2D animation, which the producers said was determined regarding what the story mandated.

=== Music ===
In June 2023, Ramin Djawadi was revealed to be composing for the series. He began recording the score two months later. Original songs for the series were written and produced by the duo Campfire (Shane Eli and Jonny Pakfar) based on themes by Djawadi. The duo also provided additional music for the series' score. A 52 track soundtrack album with the original score and original songs was released on February 21, 2025.

Win or Lose

Soundtrack album by Ramin Djawadi
- Released: February 21, 2025
- Genre: Soundtrack
- Length: 82:00
- Label: Walt Disney
- Producer: Ramin Djawadi

Ramin Djawadi chronology
House of the Dragon (season 2) (2024)	Win or Lose (2025)	Death by Lightning (2025)

All tracks are written by Ramin Djawadi, except where noted.

No.	Title	Artist(s)	Length
1.	"You Are All Winners"		1:08
2.	"Let's Go Laurie"		1:56
3.	"You'll Get 'em Next Time"		1:07
4.	"Training Montage"		1:11
5.	"High Stakes"		1:16
6.	"Off to the Races" (feat. Francci Richard)	Campfire	1:12
7.	"For My Team"		0:47
8.	"Just Doing My Job"		1:29
9.	"What Are You Up To?"		0:52
10.	"I'm Independent"		2:08
11.	"From the Moment I Laid Eyes On You"		1:28
12.	"Brand New Day"	Campfire	1:09
13.	"Stack It Up"	Campfire	1:15
14.	"One of Those Lovely Days"		1:11
15.	"Game Time"		1:06
16.	"Husslin'"	Campfire	1:22
17.	"BadBoy2023"		1:46
18.	"Pick Up the Phone"		0:46
19.	"Meet Me Halfway" (feat. Francci Richard)	Campfire	2:50
20.	"Express Yourself" (feat. Francci Richard)	Campfire	1:30
21.	"Mom Brag"		1:05
22.	"Second Chances"		1:56
23.	"Feeling Myself" (feat. Francci Richard)	Campfire	1:47
24.	"Do It Like That"	Campfire	1:36
25.	"We Need to Talk"		1:17
26.	"Your Heart Is My Home" (feat. Francci Richard)	Campfire	2:35
27.	"The Mighty Warrior"		0:57
28.	"You Are Part of Us Now"		0:51
29.	"Snack Shack Attack"		1:56
30.	"Dreamin' Awake"	Campfire & Ramin Djawadi	1:22
31.	"Friends Again?"		2:22
32.	"Bleacher Creatures for Life"		1:22
33.	"What It All Means" (feat. Varren Wade)	Campfire	2:53
34.	"The Yuwen Show"		1:23
35.	"You Are Not Funny"		0:36
36.	"The Real Me"		1:32
37.	"Paradise" (feat. Lils)	Campfire	2:17
38.	"Baseball Tango"		1:01
39.	"The Joke Is On Me"	Campfire	2:07
40.	"New Pickle in Town"		1:58
41.	"Fresh Start"		1:47
42.	"Try Your Best"		1:52
43.	"No Pressure"		1:36
44.	"Quicksand" (feat. Rozzi)	Campfire	1:46
45.	"An Amazing Coach"		1:07
46.	"I Believe in You"		1:15
47.	"Go Pickles"		1:57
48.	"For the Win"		2:13
49.	"The Final Inning"		2:59
50.	"You Are More Than Enough"		1:18
51.	"Win or Lose"		2:23
52.	"Key to Life"	Campfire	2:24

=== Cancelled follow-up ===
A follow-up television series was in development, but it was quietly cancelled.

== Release ==
Win or Lose was initially announced to premiere on Disney+ in December 2023. However, on November 15, 2023, it was announced that the series was delayed to 2024. The series was then slated to premiere on December 6, 2024, before being delayed again to February 19, 2025, swapping release dates with fellow Pixar series Dream Productions. The series consisted of eight episodes, which were released on a two episodes a week basis until March 12, 2025. On March 7, 2025, the first episode "Coach's Kid" was uploaded to Pixar's YouTube channel.

=== Marketing ===
On November 12, 2021, during Pixar's special for 2021's Disney+ Day, the first look at the concept art was revealed, offering a sneak peek at some of the characters featured in the series. It received mostly positive response from Pixar fans. On September 9, 2022, during the 2022 D23 Expo, Hobson and Yates presented a first look at the series. On June 16, 2023, footage of an episode initially titled "Vanessa: The Cool Mom" (retitled "Pickle") was shown at the Annecy International Animation Film Festival. A teaser trailer was released on August 9, 2024, while the official trailer was released on January 16, 2025.

== Reception ==
=== Viewership ===
Win or Lose ranked No. 1 on Disney+'s daily "Top 10" list a day after its premiere—a ranking based on daily viewership across both films and episodic content—and remained on the chart through March 31, 2025. Luminate, which gathers viewership data from certain smart TVs in the U.S., reported that Win or Lose ranked third among U.S. children's programming in streaming from January 3 to April 25, 2025, with 923 million minutes of watch time across Disney+ and YouTube. Nielsen Media Research, which records streaming viewership on U.S. television screens, estimated that Win or Lose garnered 6.2 million viewers in the U.S. over its first 35 days, making it one of the most popular shows of the 2024–2025 season.

=== Critical response ===
The series received generally positive reviews from critics. On the review aggregator website Rotten Tomatoes reported an 87% approval rating with an average rating of 6.7/10, based on 30 critic reviews. The website's critics consensus reads, "By giving each member of its ragtag team of lovable kids their time to shine, Win or Lose bats close to a perfect game." Metacritic, which uses a weighted average, assigned a score of 68 out of 100 based on 13 critics, indicating "generally favorable" reviews.

Polly Conway of Common Sense Media gave Win or Lose a rating of four out of five stars, praising the show's diverse and relatable characters, highlighting positive role models like Laurie, who is determined to impress her father, and Frank, who navigates personal struggles with self-worth and romance. Conway found the content to be generally mild, with occasional body humor, bullying, and light sports violence. She noted that while there is some romantic content and light language, the series promotes positive messages about overcoming challenges and being kind. Jesse Hassenger from IGN rated the series 8 out of 10 and praised its emotional depth and its ability to balance humor and whimsy while exploring themes like anxiety and self-worth, using inventive animation metaphors. He found that the show's episodic format, focusing on different characters' perspectives, was both engaging and innovative. He stated that, despite the show's occasional feeling of fragmentation due to its short episodes, Win or Lose succeeds in offering a relatable and heartfelt experience for both kids and adults. He also noted that the series' handling of emotional challenges, particularly in its portrayal of characters processing difficult situations, was both clever and sensitive, though he expressed disappointment over the removal of a storyline involving a transgender character.

Elijah Gonzalez of Paste rated the show 8.3 out of 10 and complimented its ability to balance humor with serious themes, including Laurie's struggles with parental expectations and Frank's emotional journey after a breakup. He noted that Pixar's usual high-quality animation translates well into TV, with inventive visual metaphors that represent characters' inner turmoil in imaginative ways. While he enjoyed the emotional depth and humor of the show, he pointed out that the episodes lack resolution, making them feel like short films without closure. He also expressed disappointment over the removal of a trans character storyline. Despite these issues, he found Win or Lose to be a pleasant surprise, offering a fresh take on the sports genre by focusing more on the personal lives of the characters than the sport itself. Andrew Parker of TheGATE.ca said that Win or Lose is an ambitious and emotionally rich project that will appeal to both kids and adults. He praised the show for its playful execution and depth, comparing it to Rashomon and The Afterparty in its exploration of the same events from multiple perspectives. He found the series to balance humor and heartfelt moments, with a slightly darker tone than expected. He stated that each episode offers a unique viewpoint, focusing on different characters' experiences, and noted the show's emotional tone. While he acknowledged some moments felt softened for a broader audience, he praised the visuals and storytelling, describing Win or Lose an engaging and easily watchable series that showcases Pixar's strength in long-form storytelling.

=== Accolades ===
Accolades received by Your Friendly Neighborhood Spider-Man
Award	Date of ceremony	Category	Recipient(s)	Result	Ref.
Annie Awards	February 21, 2026	Best Limited Series	"Home"	Won	
Annie Awards	February 21, 2026	Outstanding Achievement for Character Animation in an Animated Television / Broadcast Production	Alli Sadegiani	Won	
Annie Awards	February 21, 2026	Outstanding Achievement for Character Design in an Animated Television / Broadcast Production	Lou Hamou-Lhadj (for "Home")	Nominated	
Annie Awards	February 21, 2026	Outstanding Achievement for Music in an Animated Television / Broadcast Production	Ramin Djawadi, Shane Eli and Jonny Pakfar (for "Mixed Signals")	Won	
Annie Awards	February 21, 2026	Outstanding Achievement for Storyboarding in an Animated Television / Broadcast Production	Esteban Bravo (for "Home")	Nominated	
Annie Awards	February 21, 2026	Outstanding Achievement for Writing in an Animated Television / Broadcast Production	Carrie Hobson and Michael Yates (for "Pickle")	Nominated	
Artios Awards	February 26, 2026	Animated Program For Television	Natalie Lyon, Kevin Reher and Kate Hansen-birnbaum	Nominated	
Children's and Family Emmy Awards	March 2, 2026	Outstanding Children's or Young Teen Animated Series	Win or Lose	Won	
Children's and Family Emmy Awards	March 2, 2026	Outstanding Younger Voice Performer in a Preschool, Children's or Young Teen Program	Chanel Stewart	Nominated	
Children's and Family Emmy Awards	March 2, 2026	Outstanding Writing for an Animated Program	Carrie Hobson and Michael Yates (for "Pickle")	Won	
Children's and Family Emmy Awards	March 2, 2026	Outstanding Directing for an Animated Series	Lou Hamou-Lhadj, Carrie Hobson and Michael Yates (for "Home")	Won	
Children's and Family Emmy Awards	March 2, 2026	Outstanding Casting for an Animated Program	Win or Lose	Nominated	
Children's and Family Emmy Awards	March 2, 2026	Outstanding Editing for an Animated Program	"Mixed Signals"	Won	
Children's and Family Emmy Awards	March 2, 2026	Outstanding Sound Editing and Sound Mixing for an Animated Program	"Home"	Nominated	
Children's and Family Emmy Awards	March 2, 2026	Individual Achievement in Animation	Esteban Bravo (Storyboard)	Won	
TCA Awards	August 20, 2025	Outstanding Achievement in Family Programming	Win or Lose	Nominated	
Visual Effects Society Awards	February 25, 2026	Emerging Technology Award	David Munier, Ana Gabriela Lacaze, Jonathan Page, Anna-Christine Lykkegaard (For "Detached Facial Features")	Nominated	
