= Troop Zero =

2019 comedy-drama film

- Theatrical release poster
- Directed by: Bert & Bertie
- Screenplay by: Lucy Alibar
- Based on: Christmas and Jubilee Behold The Meteor Shower by Lucy Alibar
- Produced by: Todd Black; Jason Blumenthal; Steve Tisch
- Starring: Viola Davis; Mckenna Grace; Jim Gaffigan; Mike Epps; Charlie Shotwell; Allison Janney
- Cinematography: Jim Whitaker
- Edited by: Catherine Haight
- Music by: Rob Lord
- Production companies: Big Indie Pictures; Escape Artists; Juvee Productions
- Distributed by: Amazon Studios
- Release dates: February 1, 2019 (Sundance); January 17, 2020 (United States)
- Running time: 94 minutes
- Country: United States
- Language: English
- Budget: $10-20 million

Troop Zero is a 2019 American comedy-drama film directed by Bert & Bertie (Amber Templemore-Finlayson and Katie Ellwood), from a screenplay by Lucy Alibar and inspired by Alibar's 2010 play Christmas and Jubilee Behold The Meteor Shower. The film stars Viola Davis, Mckenna Grace, Jim Gaffigan, Mike Epps, Charlie Shotwell, and Allison Janney.

Troop Zero had its world premiere as the closing film of Sundance Film Festival on February 1, 2019, and was released in the United States by Amazon Studios on January 17, 2020.

The film was met with mixed reviews.

== Plot ==
In rural Wiggly, Georgia in 1977, a group of elementary-school misfits band together to form their own troop of Birdie Scouts.

Led by spunky outcast Christmas Flint, they infiltrate the Birdie Scout youth group in order to win a talent show. The winning Birdies will earn the right to have their voices included on the Voyager Golden Record, which Christmas believes will be heard by life in outer space, a connection her deceased mother nurtured. When they form the troop, the only number left unassigned in the state is zero.

While the Birdie Troop leader Krystal Massey intends to assign "Troop Zero" to them as a slight, the girls, and one boy, take it as a good sign as it's the number representing infinity. Troop Zero requires a troop mother, and they find one in Christmas's father's secretary Rayleen, who also has history with Mrs. Massey.

To qualify to compete in the talent show, Troop Zero must first obtain one troop badge each. As they go about earning them, they learn more about themselves and each other. The troop enters the contest, performing an interpretive dance of David Bowie’s "Space Oddity". During the performance, Christmas gets nervous and wets herself, and the rest of the kids join her to make her feel comfortable as the crowd laughs at them, but they carry on with their performance. In the end, they lose when the judges vote for the high-and-mighty Birdie Troop Five. Christmas gracefully accepts defeat and shakes hands with an impressed Mrs. Massey, who makes up with Rayleen.

Later that night, a representative from NASA joins the Troop Zero members during a meteor shower to record their voices to be transmitted into space as well. Hopeful and confident, Christmas wishes that the aliens are happy, that they're taking care of her mom, and that they have the same kind of friends she’s gained from the experience.

== Cast ==
- Mckenna Grace as Christmas Flint
- Viola Davis as Miss Rayleen
- Jim Gaffigan as Ramsey Flint
- Allison Janney as Krystal Massey
- Charlie Shotwell as Joseph
- Johanna Colón as Smash
- Milan Ray as Hell-No Price
- Bella Higginbotham as Anne-Claire
- Mike Epps as Dwayne Champaign
- Ashley Brooke as Piper Keller
- Kai Ture' as Ginger
- Edi Patterson as Miss Aimee
- Gwendolyn Mulamba as Miss Penny
- Jecobi Swain as Ray-Ray

== Production ==
In February 2018, it was announced Viola Davis had joined the cast of the film, with Bert & Bertie directing from a screenplay by Lucy Alibar. Todd Black produced the film, which Amazon Studios would distribute.

This is the second feature film directed by Bert & Bertie, who have been creating commercials and shorts together since they met on a project in 2005.

In March 2018, Mckenna Grace joined the cast of the film. In April 2018, Allison Janney and Jim Gaffigan joined the cast. In May 2018, Mike Epps, Charlie Shotwell and Edi Patterson joined the cast. In June 2018, Johanna Colón, Ashley Brooke, Milan Ray, Bella Higginbotham, and Kai Ture' joined the cast of the film. Troop Zero marks the second film together for Janney and Grace, who co-starred in the 2017 biopic I, Tonya. This is also the second film featuring Allison Janney and Viola Davis, who co-starred in the 2011 film The Help.

The musical score for the film is by long time Bert & Bertie collaborator composer Rob Lord who has scored all the directors' projects to date.

=== Filming ===
Principal photography began in May 2018 at Fairview-Riverside State Park in Madisonville, Louisiana, with additional photography completed in Luling, Louisiana.

== Release ==
It had its world premiere at the Sundance Film Festival on February 1, 2019. This was the first feature film from Amazon Studios to be released as streaming-only, on the Amazon Prime Video service, on January 17, 2020.

== Reception ==
=== Critical response ===
On Rotten Tomatoes, the film holds a 68% approval rating based on 65 reviews, with an average rating of 6.4/10, with the consensus "Thanks to a charming cast and infectious energy, Troop Zero is more than the sum of its instantly familiar parts." On Metacritic it has a score of 58% based on reviews from 12 critics, indicating "mixed or average reviews".

Richard Roeper of the Chicago Sun-Times wrote: "Troop Zero is so sugary you’d get a cavity if you bit into it — but it’s also a cozy, satisfying and inspirational underdog tale, featuring a wonderful performance by Mckenna Grace." John DeFore of The Hollywood Reporter praised performance of Viola Davis, "Davis isn't given a very satisfying backstory to work with, but when has she needed one? The actress strikes a satisfying balance between reluctance and protectiveness. Gaffigan and Janney offer just what their parts in the story need, but Davis keeps it all on the rails."
