= Bert and Bertie =

British film and television directors

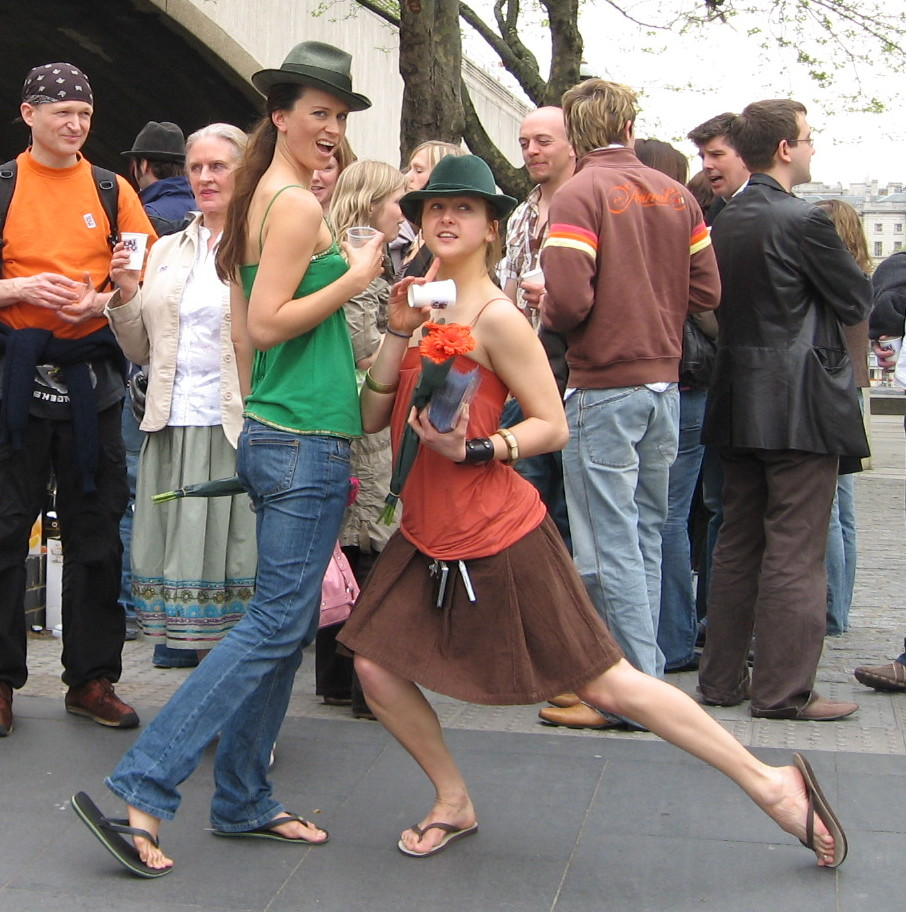
- Bert (left) and Bertie premiering their short film Phobias in 2006
- Born: Bert: Amber Templemore-Finlayson Bertie: Katie Ellwood
- Occupations: Directors, writers, producers
- Years active: 2002–present
- Notable work: Troop Zero, Hawkeye

Amber Templemore-Finlayson and Katie Ellwood, collectively known as Bert and Bertie, respectively, are British film and television directors. They are best known for directing the film Troop Zero. They also directed a block of episodes for the Disney+ series Hawkeye and Our Flag Means Death. Ellwood is also known individually as the co-creator of The Getaway franchise, the basis for the crime drama series Gangs of London.

== Career ==
Templemore and Ellwood met in 2005 in London when Templemore was making a short film series to go along with The Getaway video game, and Ellwood was the game's writer. Ellwood had previously worked for Sony Computer Entertainment as an assistant producer and script consultant. Their first project was the short film Phobias. The two have also directed commercials for McDonald's.

In 2019, they directed the comedy-drama film Troop Zero. They were inspired to create it after realizing the social and cultural impact it could have on young girls, saying that they felt "there had never been a film about a group of young girls that go on an adventure to achieve something by working together and succeeding". They convinced producer Todd Black at Escape Artists to help, and after being approved by Escape Artists, producer Ted Hope and his Amazon Originals team let them pitch the film. For the pitch, they created Birdie Scout manuals filled with ideas on how to create the film. They also made a "rip-o-matic" of reference movies to give Amazon Studios a sense of "the comic yet emotional tone of the movie", and chose 20 images defining the film they wanted to create. After its completion, the duo were hired again by Amazon to rewrite and direct Eurydice, a retelling of the Greek myth described as "Terminator meets Thelma & Louise."

Before the COVID-19 pandemic, the duo were actively developing the biopic feature A Special Relationship written by Simon Beaufoy and set to star Rachel Weisz as Elizabeth Taylor. The heavily-researched film was set to chronicle Taylor's journey from actress to activist through her friendship with her assistant Roger Wall.

In July 2020, it was announced they would direct a block of episodes for the Disney+ series Hawkeye, which premiered in November 2021.

In February 2021, it was announced that the two would direct Queen Bitch & The High Horse, a film about the largest municipal fraud in American history. Cate Blanchett and her production company Dirty Films will produce, along with New Republic Pictures.

In August 2022, it was announced that the duo has signed to direct a feature film adaptation of the Disneyland attraction Big Thunder Mountain Railroad.

In November 2022, Templemore was set to solo-direct Keke Palmer in the action-comedy Moxie, while Ellwood was announced in May 2023 to be directing the cybercrime action thriller Gargoyle, as well as her own script about Esther Williams' LSD trip. Other contemporary projects included The Queen, based on the magazine article and book by Josh Levin.

Templemore and Ellwood directed two episodes of the first season of the Apple TV+ series Silo. Templemore solo directed seven episodes of Silo's second and third season. They directed two episodes of the 2023 Apple TV+ series Lessons in Chemistry.

As of 2025, Ellwood was in pre-production on and attached to solo direct the feature Back Together, from the original script by Erin Cardillo about an indecisive woman who goes backwards in time. That year she also boarded a film adaption of Hannah Gold's bestselling novel The Last Bear; casting for which was said to be underway.

After directing some television, Ellwood officially returned to feature filmmaking with Eleven Missing Days, starring Felicity Jones as Agatha Christie.

== Personal lives ==
Templemore and Ellwood are from London, and are based in Los Angeles and London as of January 2019. Templemore grew up in Johannesburg, and Ellwood grew up in Leicester, England. They like to call themselves "the Berts" and have not revealed why they chose the names Bert and Bertie.

Their influences include the Coen brothers, Guillermo del Toro, Jean-Pierre Jeunet, Marc Caro and Tim Burton.

== Filmography ==
=== Film ===
Year	Title	Directors	Writers	Producers	Notes
2006	Phobias	Yes	Yes	No	Short film
2006	Antonio's Breakfast	No	No	Bert	Short film, credited as Amber Templemore-Finlayson
2006	Glue	No	No	Bert	Co-producer, credited as Amber Templemore-Finlayson
2009	The Taxidermist	Yes	Yes	No	Short films
2012	Worm	Yes	No	No	Short films
2016	Dance Camp	Yes	No	No	
2019	Troop Zero	Yes	No	No	
TBA	Eleven Missing Days	Bertie	No	No	Filming

=== Television ===
Year	Title	Notes
2020	Kidding	"The Acceptance Speech", "A Seat on the Rocket"
2020	The Great	"And You Sir, Are No Peter the Great", "Moscow Mule"
2021	Hawkeye	"Echoes", "Partners, Am I Right?", "Ronin"
2022	Our Flag Means Death	"We Gull Way Back", "Act of Grace"
2023–26	Silo	Both (season 1): "The Relic", "The Flamekeepers"; Bert (seasons 2–3): 7 episodes; credited as Amber Templemore
2023	Lessons in Chemistry	"Living Dead Things", "Primitive Instinct"
2024	The Walking Dead: The Ones Who Live	"Years", "Gone"
2025	Twisted Metal	Bertie: "VAVAVUM", "M4YH3M"; credited as Bertie Ellwood
2026	The Miniature Wife	Bertie: "What Category Is Shrinking Your Wife", "Don't Freak Out!"; credited as Bertie Ellwood

=== Video games ===
Year	Title	Notes
2002	The Getaway	Bertie only, credited as Katie Ellwood
2015	Just Cause 3	Bertie only, credited as Katie Ellwood

== Awards ==
Year	Award	Category	Work	Result	Ref.
2006	British Academy Film Awards	Best Short Film	Antonio's Breakfast	Won	
2009	Rhode Island International Film Festival	First Place: Best Cinematography	The Taxidermist	Won	
2009	Palm Springs International ShortFest	Best Live Action Over 15 Minutes	The Taxidermist	Won	
2012	Leeds International Film Festival	Special Mention: Best British Short	Worm	Won	

They were also named one of Variety's 2019 Directors to Watch.
