= Milan Ray =

American actress

- Born: January 11, 2008 (age 18); United States
- Occupation: Actress
- Years active: 2019–present

Milan Ray is an American actress. She is best known for playing Keisa Clemmons in the coming of age comedy series The Wonder Years and Hell-No Price in the comedy drama film Troop Zero.

== Early life ==
Ray grew up in Dallas,Texas. Her mom said she was obsessed with the The Twilight films before she was three years old which may have been the trigger for her wanting to become an actress. She entered an acting class when she was six years old.

== Career ==
Her first feature-length film role was as Hell-No Price in the comedy drama movie Troop Zero starring Viola Davis and Allison Janney. She portrayed Shay in the drama film Charm City Kings. She portrayed Lil in season 2 of the romantic comedy series Modern Love Her biggest role of her career so far was playing Keisa Clemmons in the coming of age comedy series The Wonder Years. Danica McKellar who portrayed Winnie Cooper in the original series reached out to her to congratulate her and wish her luck. In June 2022 it was revealed that Ray would play an important role in the upcoming Blade film. The film was never produced due to creative differences between the studio and Mahershala Ali. She made her voice acting debut in the animated sports comedy television miniseries Win or Lose.

== Personal life ==
She has volunteered with several animal charities and has a pet rabbit named Zara, whom she sometimes takes with her when travelling. She is also studying Japanese.

== Filmography ==
=== Film ===
Year	Title	Role	Notes
2019	Troop Zero	Hell-No Price	
2020	Charm City Kings	Shay	

=== Television ===
Year	Title	Role	Notes
2021	Boomerang	Young Simone	2 episodes
2021-2022	Modern Love	Lil	Episode; A Life Plan for Two, Followed by One
2022	The Wonder Years	Keisa Clemmons	32 episodes
2025	Win or Lose	Rochelle	8 episodes
