= The Wonder Years (2021 TV series) =

2021 American television sitcom

- Genre: Comedy; Coming-of-age story
- Created by: Saladin K. Patterson
- Inspired by: The Wonder Years by: Neal Marlens; Carol Black
- Starring: Elisha "EJ" Williams; Dulé Hill; Saycon Sengbloh; Laura Kariuki; Amari O'Neil; Julian Lerner; Milan Ray
- Narrated by: Don Cheadle
- Country of origin: United States
- Original language: English
- No. of seasons: 2
- No. of episodes: 32

Production
- Executive producers: Saladin K. Patterson; Lee Daniels; Marc Velez; Fred Savage (season 1)
- Camera setup: Single-camera
- Production companies: Lee Daniels Entertainment; Matthew 6:33; The Crest Lamp Company (season 1); 20th Television

Original release
- Network: ABC
- Release: September 22, 2021 – August 16, 2023

Related
- The Wonder Years

The Wonder Years is an American coming-of-age comedy television series developed by Saladin K. Patterson that aired from September 22, 2021, to August 16, 2023, on ABC. Inspired by the 1988 series of the same title, it stars Elisha "EJ" Williams as Dean Williams, and follows his life as he grows up in Montgomery, Alabama, in the late 1960s. Don Cheadle lends his voice as the narrator for the series as the adult counterpart of Dean. In May 2022, the series was renewed for a second season, which premiered on June 14, 2023. In September 2023, the series was cancelled after two seasons.

== Premise ==
The Wonder Years is set in the late 1960s and takes a look at the Williams family, Black middle-class residents of Montgomery, Alabama, through the point of view of imaginative 12-year-old Dean.

== Cast ==
=== Main ===
- Elisha "EJ" Williams as Dean Williams
  - Don Cheadle narrates as an older Dean
- Dulé Hill as Bill Williams, Dean's father
- Saycon Sengbloh as Lillian Williams, Dean's mother
- Laura Kariuki as Kim Williams, Dean's sister
- Amari O'Neil as Cory Long, Dean's friend
- Julian Lerner as Brad Hitman, Dean's friend
- Milan Ray as Keisa Clemmons, Dean's friend on whom he has a secret crush

=== Recurring ===
- Caleb Black as Norman
- Allen Maldonado as Coach Long, Dean's baseball coach and Lillian's co-worker
- Charity Jordan as Vivian Long, Coach Long's wife
- Milan Marsh as Charlene
- Andrew Tull as Hampton
- Sami Bray as Future Karen
- Spence Moore II as Bruce Williams, Dean's older brother

=== Guest ===
- Richard Gant as Grandaddy Clisby
- Malcolm-Jamal Warner as Melvin Williams, Dean's uncle
- Patti LaBelle as Shirley Williams, Dean's grandmother
- Josh Rhett Noble as Jim Fleming
- Gregory Zarian as Herb Hitman

== Episodes ==
Season	Episodes	Originally released	
Season	Episodes	First released	Last released
1	22	September 22, 2021	May 18, 2022
2	10	June 14, 2023	August 16, 2023

=== Season 1 (2021–22) ===
No. overall	No. in season	Title	Directed by	Written by	Original release date	Prod. code	U.S. viewers (millions)
1	1	"Pilot"	Fred Savage	Saladin K. Patterson	September 22, 2021	1EDT01	3.23
Dean organizes the first integrated baseball game between his team and his friend Brad's team. The Williams family and their friends deal with the assassination of Martin Luther King Jr., and Dean gets his heart broken.
2	2	"Green Eyed Monster"	Fred Savage	Mary Fitzgerald	September 29, 2021	1EDT02	2.69
3	3	"The Club"	Fred Savage	Max Searle	October 6, 2021	1EDT03	2.45
4	4	"The Workplace"	Shiri Appleby	Meredith Dawson & Kendra Cole	October 13, 2021	1EDT05	2.72
Dean spends the day at his mother's office, as Lillian is an accounting executive with a master's degree. Dean finds new appreciation for how hard his mother works, despite the fact that her co-workers generally do not respect it. At the end of the episode, she is promoted over Coach Long, who also works in the office.
5	5	"The Lock In"	Molly McGlynn	Amberia Allen	October 20, 2021	1EDT06	2.08
6	6	"Be Prepared"	Numa Perrier & Fred Savage	Bob Daily	October 27, 2021	1EDT07	2.57
7	7	"Independence Day"	Robert Townsend	Jacque Edmonds Cofer	November 3, 2021	1EDT04	2.23
8	8	"Science Fair"	Matthew A. Cherry	Yamin Segal	November 17, 2021	1EDT08	2.47
9	9	"Home for Christmas"	Fred Savage	Bob Daily	December 1, 2021	1EDT09	2.18
10	10	"Lads and Ladies and Us"	Ken Whittingham	Jacque Edmonds Cofer	January 5, 2022	1EDT11	2.41
11	11	"Brad Mitzvah"	Fred Savage	Yael Galena	January 12, 2022	1EDT10	2.54
12	12	"I'm With the Band"	Victor Nelli Jr.	Jordan Black	January 19, 2022	1EDT12	2.14
13	13	"The Valentine's Day Dance"	Victor Nelli Jr.	Brett Melnick	February 2, 2022	1EDT13	2.36
14	14	"Country Dean"	Fred Savage	Bob Daily	February 23, 2022	1EDT14	2.24
15	15	"Black Teacher"	Fred Savage	Amberia Allen	March 2, 2022	1EDT15	2.25
16	16	"The Sleepover"	Shiri Appleby	Jordan Black	March 16, 2022	1EDT16	1.99
17	17	"Jobs and Hangouts"	Aisha Tyler	Jacque Edmonds Cofer	March 23, 2022	1EDT17	2.04
18	18	"Goose Grease"	Ken Whittingham	Yael Galena	April 6, 2022	1EDT18	1.97
19	19	"Love & War"	Numa Perrier	Kendra Cole	April 13, 2022	1EDT19	2.01
20	20	"Bill's New Gig"	David Robert Jones	Dioverd Danny Batista	April 20, 2022	1EDT20	1.88
21	21	"Where No Dean Has Been Before"	Ken Whittingham	Bo Zenga	May 11, 2022	1EDT21	1.84
22	22	"Love, Dean"	Saladin K. Patterson	Yamin Segal	May 18, 2022	1EDT22	2.05

=== Season 2 (2023) ===
No. overall	No. in season	Title	Directed by	Written by	Original release date	Prod. code	U.S. viewers (millions)
23	1	"One Small Step"	Ken Whittingham	Saladin K. Patterson	June 14, 2023	2EDT01	2.09
24	2	"Forbidden Fruit"	Ken Whittingham	Bob Daily	June 14, 2023	2EDT02	1.80
25	3	"Football Team"	Stacey Muhammad	Amberia Allen	June 21, 2023	2EDT03	1.90
26	4	"Blockbusting"	Nefertite Nguvu	Jacque Edmonds Cofer	June 28, 2023	2EDT05	1.84
27	5	"Takeover Spirit"	Melissa Kosar	Jordan Black	July 5, 2023	2EDT04	1.93
28	6	"Bill's New Friend"	Ken Whittingham	Max Searle	July 26, 2023	2EDT06	1.71
29	7	"A Star is Born"	Lisa C. Satriano	Melanie Boysaw	August 2, 2023	2EDT07	1.60
30	8	"Like A Boss"	Michael Schultz	Tom Young	August 9, 2023	2EDT08	1.58
31	9	"Happy Birthday Clisby"	Katie Locke O'Brien	Kendra Cole	August 16, 2023	2EDT09	1.87
32	10	"The Happiest Place on Earth"	Ken Whittingham	Yael Galena	August 16, 2023	2EDT10	1.49

== Production ==
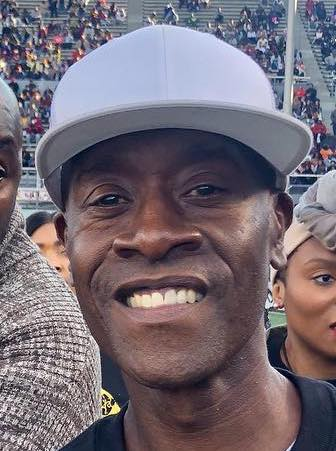
Actor Don Cheadle is the show's narrator

The Wonder Years was announced on July 8, 2020, when ABC gave the project a pilot order with Fred Savage, the star of the original series, attached to direct and executive produce. In January 2021, the pilot was confirmed, with production taking place in Atlanta, Georgia. In March 2021, Saycon Sengbloh, Elisha "EJ" Williams, Dulé Hill, Laura Kariuki, Milan Ray, Julian Lerner, and Amari O'Neil joined the cast, with Don Cheadle announced to serve as the show's narrator. On May 14, 2021, The Wonder Years was given a series order. In July, Allen Maldonado was cast in a recurring role.

At a Television Critics Association panel discussion in August 2021, crew members revealed that the series would tackle major events from 1968, including the assassination of Martin Luther King Jr. When asked about casting Maldonado, whose character at the time was speculated to be Afro-Latino like Maldonado, writer and executive producer Saladin K. Patterson said they "wanted to represent the diaspora of Blackness for sure. And some of that is in appearance and looks but some of it is just in the background and those individual stories that come from those mixes of cultures. He certainly fits into that tableau that we want to set." The first season was originally given a 9-episode order. On October 26, 2021, the first season was expanded to a full season of 22 episodes. In November 2021, it was reported Richard Gant and Spence Moore II would also star.

=== Firing of Savage ===
In May 2022, Savage was fired from his roles as executive producer and director after allegations of inappropriate conduct, including "verbal outbursts and inappropriate behavior". Seven days later, ABC renewed the series for a second season, which premiered on June 14, 2023. On September 15, 2023, ABC cancelled the series after two seasons.

== Release ==
In the U.S., the series aired from September 22, 2021, to August 16, 2023, on ABC. In Canada, the series aired on CTV. The series premiered as an original series in selected countries on Disney+ via Star on June 1. In Latin America, the series debuted on Disney+ as a Disney+ exclusive. On November 8, 2021, Hollywood Records made the show's theme song available to stream and download. The song is written by Roahn Hylton and Jacob Yoffee and features vocals by Scotty Granger. The first season of The Wonder Years was added to Disney+ on June 15, 2022. The second season of The Wonder Years was added to Disney+ on August 17, 2023.

== Reception ==
=== Critical response ===
On the review aggregator website Rotten Tomatoes, 96% of 24 critics' reviews are positive, with an average rating of 7.7/10. The website's consensus reads: "Sweetly nostalgic without sacrificing substance, The Wonder Years captures the magic of the original while adding necessary nuance and context to its tale of Black life in America." Metacritic, which uses a weighted average, assigned a score of 75 out of 100 based on 18 critics, indicating "generally favorable reviews".

The pilot episode was given to critics to review the series ahead of its premiere. In a review for Variety, Daniel D'Addario said that while parts of the 22-minute pilot felt "rushed", its focus on the time period made "its characters' relationships feel vivid and real against the backdrop of changing times." In his final points, D'Addario gave positive feedback to the cast and said "the pilot's final insight is nicely communicated." The Hollywood Reporter's Angie Han had similar comments, writing, "the series manages to invoke nostalgia for bygone days while also remaining relatively clear-eyed about the challenges of that period ... and it accomplishes this while delivering the cozy appeal of the best family sitcoms." Jen Chaney of Vulture stated The Wonder Years succeeds both at honoring its source material and providing something on its own, stating the series is one of the few reboots that is handled with "care, intelligence, and clear intention," writing, "This is what a smart reboot does: It builds upon what came before and honors the legacy of the original while doing something new and different. It seeks to illuminate and not just re-create. It proves that sometimes something worthwhile can be shaped out of the familiar, as long as the process is in the right hands. And The Wonder Years is certainly in some good ones."

Rebecca Nicholson of The Guardian gave the series a grade of 4 out of 5 stars and found it to be a charming and funny reboot, praising the humor and the characters, writing, "Happily, The Wonder Years has been done with care and innovation, and taps into the nostalgic appeal of the original late 80s/early 90s sitcom, while carving out a new path." Joyce Slaton of Common Sense Media rated the series 4 out of 5, praised the depiction of positive messages and role models, citing integrity and dignity, and applauded the diverse representations across the characters. Dave Nemetz of TVLine gave the pilot episode a "B," praising The Wonder Years for its vintage soundtrack, comedic tone, and focus on minorities for a story set in the 1960s. Nemetz summarized the series as "a decent enough remake, but one that lacks the groundbreaking verve of the original and pulls its punches a bit."

=== Ratings ===
==== Overall ====
Viewership and ratings per season of The Wonder Years
Season	Timeslot (ET)	Episodes	First aired		Last aired		TV season
Season	Timeslot (ET)	Episodes	Date	Viewers (millions)	Date	Viewers (millions)	TV season
1	Wednesday 8:30 p.m. (1–17, 19–22); Wednesday 9:00 p.m. (18)	22	September 22, 2021	3.23	May 18, 2022	2.05	2021–22
2	Wednesday 9:00 p.m. (1, 3–9); Wednesday 9:30 p.m. (2, 10)	10	June 14, 2023	2.09	August 16, 2023	1.49	2022–23

==== Season 1 ====
Viewership and ratings per episode of The Wonder Years
No.	Title	Air date	Rating (18–49)	Viewers (millions)	DVR (18–49)	DVR viewers (millions)	Total (18–49)	Total viewers (millions)	Ref.
1	"Pilot"	September 22, 2021	0.7	3.23	—N/a	—N/a	1.8	6.40	
2	"Green Eyed Monster"	September 29, 2021	0.5	2.69	—N/a	—N/a	—N/a	—N/a	
3	"The Club"	October 6, 2021	0.5	2.45	—N/a	—N/a	—N/a	—N/a	
4	"The Workplace"	October 13, 2021	0.5	2.72	0.1	0.68	0.7	3.40	
5	"The Lock In"	October 20, 2021	0.4	2.08	0.2	0.68	0.6	2.76	
6	"Be Prepared"	October 27, 2021	0.4	2.57	—N/a	—N/a	—N/a	—N/a	
7	"Independence Day"	November 3, 2021	0.4	2.23	—N/a	—N/a	—N/a	—N/a	
8	"Science Fair"	November 17, 2021	0.4	2.47	0.1	0.63	0.6	3.09	
9	"Home for Christmas"	December 3, 2021	0.3	2.18	0.1	0.62	0.4	2.79	
10	"Lads and Ladies and Us"	January 5, 2022	0.4	2.41	—N/a	—N/a	—N/a	—N/a	
11	"Brad Mitzvah"	January 12, 2022	0.5	2.54	—N/a	—N/a	—N/a	—N/a	
12	"I'm With the Band"	January 19, 2022	0.4	2.14	—N/a	—N/a	—N/a	—N/a	
13	"The Valentine's Day Dance"	February 2, 2022	0.4	2.36	—N/a	—N/a	—N/a	—N/a	
14	"Country Dean"	February 23, 2022	0.4	2.24	—N/a	—N/a	—N/a	—N/a	
15	"Black Teacher"	March 2, 2022	0.3	2.25	—N/a	—N/a	—N/a	—N/a	
16	"The Sleepover"	March 16, 2022	0.3	1.99	—N/a	—N/a	—N/a	—N/a	
17	"Jobs and Hangouts"	March 23, 2022	0.3	2.04	—N/a	—N/a	—N/a	—N/a	
18	"Goose Grease"	April 6, 2022	0.3	1.97	—N/a	—N/a	—N/a	—N/a	
19	"Love & War"	April 13, 2022	0.3	2.01	—N/a	—N/a	—N/a	—N/a	
20	"Bill's New Gig"	April 20, 2022	0.3	1.88	—N/a	—N/a	—N/a	—N/a	
21	"Where No Dean Has Been Before"	May 11, 2022	0.3	1.84	—N/a	—N/a	—N/a	—N/a	
22	"Love, Dean"	May 18, 2022	0.3	2.05	—N/a	—N/a	—N/a	—N/a	

==== Season 2 ====
Viewership and ratings per episode of The Wonder Years
No.	Title	Air date	Rating (18–49)	Viewers (millions)	DVR (18–49)	DVR viewers (millions)	Total (18–49)	Total viewers (millions)	Ref.
1	"One Small Step"	June 14, 2023	0.2	2.09	—N/a	—N/a	—N/a	—N/a	
2	"Forbidden Fruit"	June 14, 2023	0.2	1.80	—N/a	—N/a	—N/a	—N/a	
3	"Football Team"	June 21, 2023	0.3	1.90	—N/a	—N/a	—N/a	—N/a	
4	"Blockbusting"	June 28, 2023	0.2	1.84	—N/a	—N/a	—N/a	—N/a	
5	"Takeover Spirit"	July 5, 2023	0.2	1.93	—N/a	—N/a	—N/a	—N/a	
6	"Bill's New Friend"	July 26, 2023	0.2	1.71	—N/a	—N/a	—N/a	—N/a	
7	"A Star is Born"	August 2, 2023	0.2	1.60	—N/a	—N/a	—N/a	—N/a	
8	"Like A Boss"	August 9, 2023	0.2	1.58	—N/a	—N/a	—N/a	—N/a	
9	"Happy Birthday Clisby"	August 16, 2023	0.1	1.87	—N/a	—N/a	—N/a	—N/a	
10	"The Happiest Place on Earth"	August 16, 2023	0.1	1.49	—N/a	—N/a	—N/a	—N/a	

=== Accolades ===
Awards and nominations received by The Wonder Years
Award	Date of ceremony	Category	Recipient(s)	Result	Ref.
Hollywood Critics Association Awards	August 13, 2022	Best Broadcast Network Series, Comedy	The Wonder Years	Nominated	
NAACP Image Awards	February 26, 2022	Outstanding Actor in a Comedy Series	Elisha "EJ" Williams	Nominated	
NAACP Image Awards	February 26, 2022	Outstanding Performance by a Youth	Elisha "EJ" Williams	Nominated	
NAACP Image Awards	February 25, 2023	Outstanding Comedy Series	The Wonder Years	Nominated	
NAACP Image Awards	February 25, 2023	Outstanding Actor in a Comedy Series	Dulé Hill	Nominated	
NAACP Image Awards	February 25, 2023	Outstanding Performance by a Youth (Series, Special, Television Movie or Limited Series)	Elisha "EJ" Williams	Nominated	
Writers Guild of America Awards	March 20, 2022	Episodic Comedy	Saladin K. Patterson (for "Pilot")	Nominated	
Peabody Awards	June 6–9, 2022	Entertainment	The Wonder Years	Won	
