= Kizazi Moto: Generation Fire =

2023 animated television series

- Genre: Afrofuturism; Africanfuturism; Anthology; Sci-fi; Fantasy
- Developed by: Shofela Coker; Raymond Malinga; Ahmed Teilab
- Voices of: Florence Kasumba; Kehinde Bankole; Nasty C
- Composers: Amir Hedayah, Zethu Mashika, Zyon Black, Jordan Bridges, Darlington Chikwewo, Kojo Dodoo, Kay Faith, James Frank, Sek Hao Ho, K.ZIA, Rethabile Khumalo, Femi Koya, Olaolu Lawal, Prisca Leong, Tinashe Makura, Aero Manyelo, Joe-Louis Marques, Anton Morgan, Tapiwa Mubeda, Mpho Pholo, Poptain, Ross Sean, James Ssewakiryanga, Oliver Stotz, Pierre-Henri Wicomb, Adrienne Yong, Zap Mama
- Country of origin: South Africa
- Original language: English
- No. of episodes: 10

Production
- Executive producer: Peter Ramsey
- Producers: Tendayi Nyeke; Anthony Silverston
- Running time: 10–12 minutes
- Production company: Triggerfish Animation Studios

Original release
- Network: Disney+
- Release: July 5, 2023

Kizazi Moto: Generation Fire is a pan-African animated anthology television series produced by South African animation studio Triggerfish. It premiered on July 5, 2023, on Disney+. It received generally positive reviews from critics.

== Synopsis ==
Each film has an African perspective, from one or more directors, on themes such as social media, duality, disability, self-reflection, shared humanity, and other topics, with stories which include time travel, extraterrestrials, and alternate universes.

== Production ==
On June 27, 2021, it was announced that creators from Zimbabwe, South Africa, Uganda, Nigeria, Kenya, and Egypt would be working on a ten-part series of original animated films, entitled Kizazi Moto: Generation Fire. Peter Ramsey, co-director of Spider-Man: Into The Spider-Verse, was picked as executive producer, while Tendayi Nyeke and Anthony Silverston were supervising producers, and Triggerfish was the primary studio, along with other animation studios in Africa. Kevin Kriedemann proposed the initial idea for the anthology. The release date was described "late 2022," with each film being 10 minutes long. Some described the series as a "recent breakthrough" for the African animation industry, along with Kiff, Kiya, and Iwájú. Development of the series included a "multi-year research phase" to ensure the films accurately depicted specific cultures.

The release date was later changed to 2023, It was later announced the series would premiere on Disney+ on July 5, 2023. A trailer for the series was posted on June 13, 2023.

Before the series premiere, Ramsey described the series as displaying films showing "a unique African perspective" on the future and science fiction, while playing "to a broad audience," while directors Lesego Vorster, Isaac Mogajane, and Catherine Green talked about the storylines and animation of their specific films. Nyeke said the show's name derives from the Swahili phrase 'kizazi cha moto' which translates to 'fire generation', and 'moto' means fire in several other African languages.

== Reception ==
=== Critical response ===
The review aggregator website Rotten Tomatoes reported a 100% approval rating with an average rating of 8.30/10, based on 8 critic reviews.

Charles Pulliam-Moore of The Verge said that the series is an indication that Disney is embracing a global audience wanting "fantastical worlds dreamt up by...storytellers working outside of Hollywood." He argued that each of the short films is unique, with the series as a whole as a collection of distinct tales "informed by the sci-fi pop cultural canon," which he compared to Star Wars: Visions, said that none of the shorts are rushed or struggling to find their meaning, and added that the series will put many promising "new talents on your radar." Justin Carter of Gizmodo said that the series blends African philosophy and culture with fantasy and sci-fi elements, with family as a central theme in almost all of the episodes, while others explore the "idea of creation," with personality, in his view, shining through in each episode, along with "a superhero splash" and focus on gentrification, and has the potential to grow into something bigger. Lauren Westbrook of MovieWeb said that the series offers a different perspective than other films and series, and provides a "deeply introspective cultural commentary on modern society." The Root described the series as their "TV Pick Of The Week."

=== Accolades ===
Year	Award	Category	Nominee(s)	Result	Ref.
2024	Annie Awards	Best Animated Limited Series	Kizazi Moto: Generation Fire (for "Enkai")	Won	
2024	Annie Awards	Best Animated Effects - TV/Media	Matthew Dunwoody, Dmitry Sarkisov, Podchasha Yuri Anatolyevich, Richard Bothma, and Emile Van Straaten (for "Moremi")	Nominated	
2024	Annie Awards	Best Character Animation - TV/Media	Andre DeVilliers (for "Moremi", "Surf Sangoma" and "Stardust")	Nominated	
2024	Annie Awards	Best Character Design - TV/Media	Lesego Vorester (for "You Give Me Heart")	Nominated	
2024	Annie Awards	Best Directing - TV/Media	Shofela Coker and Andrew McNally (for "Moremi")	Nominated	
2024	Kidscreen Awards	Tweens/Teens Programming – Best Animated Series	Kizazi Moto: Generation Fire	Won	
2024	South African Film and Television Awards	Best Animation	Kizazi Moto: Generation Fire (for "Herderboy")	Won	
2025	Children's and Family Emmy Awards	Individual Achievement in Animation	Lesego Vorster (Character Design)	Won	
2025	Children's and Family Emmy Awards	Outstanding Directing for an Animated Series	Shofela Coker and Andrew McNally (for "Moremi")	Nominated	

== Episodes ==
No.	Title	Directed by	Written by	Original release date
1	"Herderboy"	Raymond Malinga	Raymond Malinga & Mpho Osei Tutu	July 5, 2023
Ndahura jumps off a spaceship over the Chwezi Highlands and meets his sister, Captain Katono, who is herding cattle with two fellow herders named Dushiime and Isingoma. The cattle produce chwezinite and are harvested for their crystals, powering their society. When a Nyamiyonga beast attacks, everyone is pinned down. Later, Ndahura follows it into a cave. After freeing a trapped calf, he fights and tames the Nyamiyonga beast with a crystal. He then returns to Katono and her fellow herders, who welcome him into their group.
2	"Mkhuzi: The Spirit Racer"	Simangaliso ‘Panda’ Sibaya & Malcom Wope	Leslie Pulsifer	July 5, 2023
In the Soweto Super Circuit, Manzo loses the race, but comes face-to-face with Ogun, a super intergalactic racing overlord, who declares that he has purchased their neighborhood, and will begin demolition the following day. Manzo's mother, in her disguise as Mkhuzi, agrees to race. However, Manzo takes his mother's place and despite several setbacks in the race caused by his inexperience, he is able to pull out a tie after merging with the spirit, Jangu, to become all-parts Zulu. Ogun, frustrated he did not win, but valuing the determination that Manzo put forth, agrees to leave the neighborhood alone and looks forward to their next race.
3	"Moremi"	Shofela Coker	Shofela Coker & Vanessa Kanu	July 5, 2023
Luo runs back to his home and is greeted by Malimba. He is later saved from soul-stealing monsters by Moremi, and learns the story of how a woman closed a doorway between worlds in hopes of keeping out the monsters. However, this woman couldn't rest until she saved her child. Later, Luo returns and merges his life force with the child, Olu, allowing Moremi to finally be reunited with him.
4	"Surf Sangoma"	Nthato Mokgata & Catherine Green	Nthato Mokgata, Catherine Green & Phumlani Pikoli	July 5, 2023
Ma Zed is ensnared by squids. Her grandson, Njabulo, is unable to save her, and she is pulled down into the ocean's depths. Years later, Njabulo is a surfing coach and he talks to his friend, Mnqobi. Both race one another until they reach a secret spot and are encouraged by locals to enter the dangerous waters and surf. Njabulo refuses, but his friend obliges. Later, Mnjobi helps the locals rob Njabulo and take his surf board, which is all he has left of his grandmother. Following this, he is encouraged by his grandmother's voice to return to the tumultuous ocean and face his fears, where he saves his friend Mnqobi, whom the renegade surfers are holding as a hostage. Mqnobi and Njabulo survive. In a final scene, a huge squid roars and prepares to approach the city.
5	"First Totem Problems"	Tshepo Moche	Tshepo Moche	July 5, 2023
Sheba can't get on a train because it doesn't identify her has an adult and is only helped at the last second by one of her family members. She attends a ceremony to get a totem, but she ends up in a place where her ancestors are living, by accident. Ultimately, she finds the totem printing room, is told that a totem connects to one's community rather than what is manufactured. Somehow she is thrown out of the spirit realm, gets her totem, leaves the ceremony, and is now considered an adult.
6	"Mukudzei"	Pious Nyenyewa & Tafadzwa Hove	Tafadzwa Hove	July 5, 2023
Muku spray paints a ruin of Great Zimbabwe, mocks someone mourning the dead, and is transported to an alternate dimension, due to a timeline glitch. He is saved by a scavenger named Rumbie and finds himself in Muchadenga, a parallel universe where Great Zimbabwe was never colonized. He barely escapes a bird which is trying to catch him, but learns that the bird is trying to help them return to the past. Thanks to the bird, Rumbie and Muku, go through the portal, with Rumbie reuniting with her mother, and Muku talking to his dad.
7	"Hatima"	Terence Maluleke and Isaac Mogajane	Isaac Mogajane	July 5, 2023
A merboy named Mati, who lives in an underwater society, reflects on his father, and wonders when he will become a warrior. His brother, Sana, says he isn't ready, and won't last a day against the enemy. When Mati proposes they use a Hatima against the foes, Sana says only the air-breathers use those weapons of war. Later, Mati learns that he, and his society, are descended from a woman, Nhela, who combined herself with a Hatima and was shunned by society. As a result, he helps Ntsako, his "foe", and realizes that he, and his "enemy", are related, and shouldn't be fighting one another.
8	"Stardust"	Ahmed Teilab	Ahmed Teilab	July 5, 2023
Nawara reaches the Oracle, who provides people with scrolls based on their given task, and despite a robot declaring that she isn't of the right "kind" to get a scroll, the Oracle gives her one anyway. She later learns there is nothing inside, with no scroll, enraging her, declaring she is going to have to "take" her destiny into her own hands. She later helps the Oracle fight off the Pallids, reclaims the star, and works with the Oracle to save the day at the observatory. In the end, she says she wants to be "nothing, but this", implying she may stay with him.
9	"You Give Me Heart"	Lesego Vorster	Nonzi Bogatsu	July 5, 2023
Sundi enters a contest to become the new God of creativity. Although he wins the approval of Maadi, goddess of plenty, he embarrasses the announcer, Tsbinki, with a clay hummingbird, and has to earn one million followers in 24 hours to "truly ascend", or he will be "basic". Tsubinki vows revenge, even as he tries to increase his follower count. Even as he reaches his goal, he embarrasses Maadi, causing her to lose followers and her goddess status. In his anger against the system, he causes everything to fall apart, with each god losing their forms. The system overloads, with Sundi and Maadi locking hands and telling the program to "delete" it all.
10	"Enkai"	Ng'endo Mukii	Ng'endo Mukii	July 5, 2023
Shiro plays with her daughter, Enkai, but insists she isn't ready to create anything yet. Enkai worries that her mom is always working, but Shiro says she isn't ready to come to Earth, yet. She later ventures to Earth and ends up in the slums of Kirinyaga Mega City, where people are rapping about exploitation of a mountain by the Euro-Kenyan corporation. Her mom saves her, but is suffering from internal pain. She insists that the corporation will not succeed in destroying the mountain. As the years past, she gathers what she needs from Earth. She saves her mother in the nick of time and brings her to a new world, named Thayari, saying humans can only save themselves now, and they enjoy their new life.
