= Simisola Gbadamosi =

Nigerian actress (born 2011)

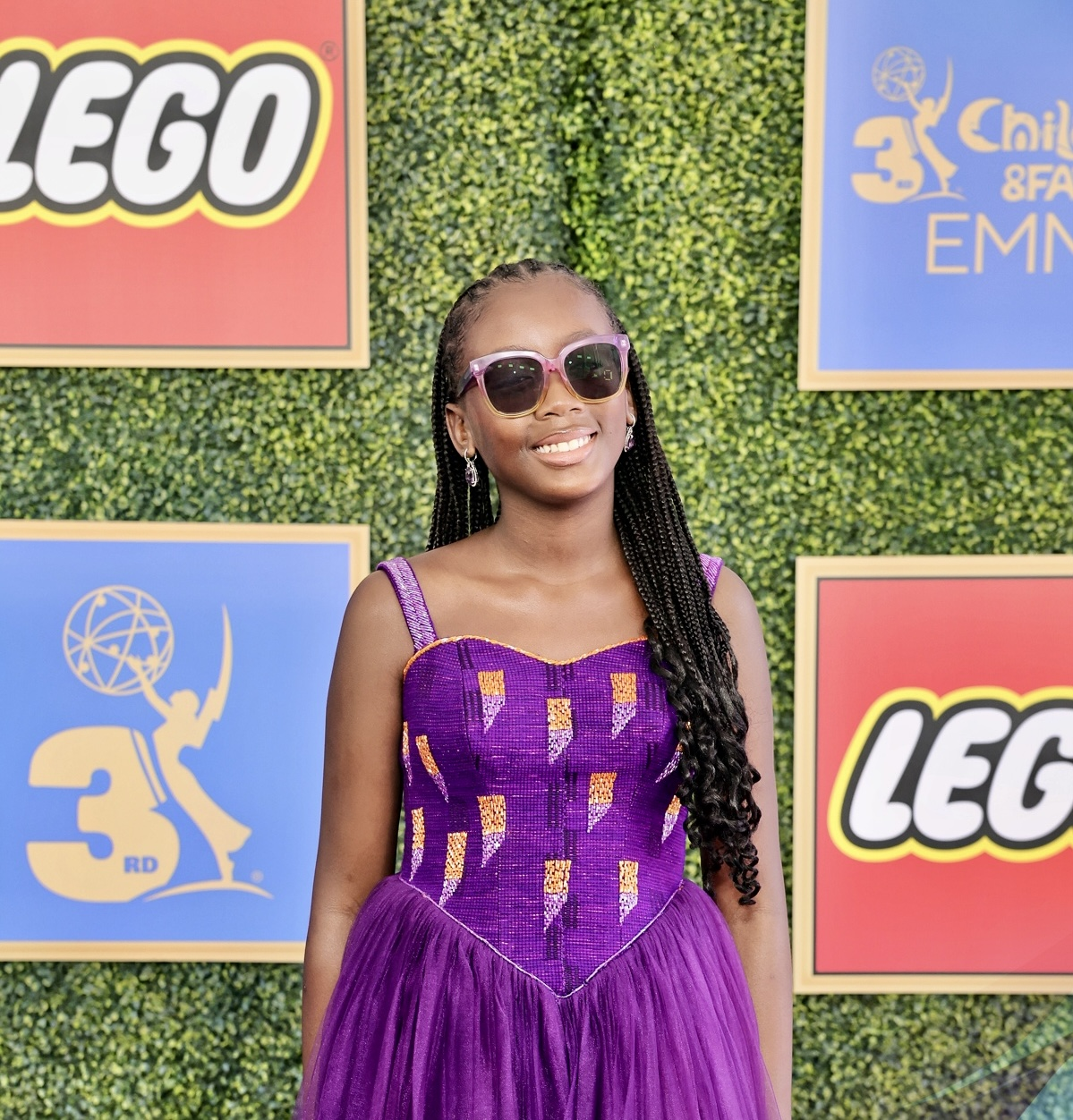
- Gbadamosi in 2025
- Born: 17 April 2011 (age 15); Washington, D.C., U.S.
- Occupation: Actress
- Years active: 2024–present
- Known for: Voice of Tola Martins in Iwájú

Simisola Gbadamosi (born 17 April 2011) is a Nigerian child actress.

== Early life and career ==
Gbadamosi was born in Washington, D.C. She grew up with a passion for storytelling and animation, which led her to pursue a career in voice acting. She made her voice acting debut in the Disney+ animated series Iwájú.

== Filmography ==
Year	Title	Role	Notes
2024	Iwájú	Tola Martins	
2025–present	Weather Hunters	Binta	

== Awards ==
Year	Award	Category	Work	Result	Ref
2025	Children's and Family Emmy Awards	Outstanding Younger Voice Performer in an Animated or Preschool Animated Program	Tola Martins, Iwájú	Nominated	
