= David Ezra Stein =

American author and illustrator

- Born: Brooklyn, New York, United States
- Occupations: Author, illustrator
- Children: 2
- Writing career
- Genre: Picture books
- Notable work: Interrupting Chicken
- Website: davidezrastein.com

David Ezra Stein is an American author and illustrator of children's books. He is best known for his Interrupting Chicken series, which was adapted into an animated television show on Apple TV+ in 2022. The first book of the series has been named a Caldecott Honor book.

== Biography ==
Stein was born in Brooklyn, New York. His father was a cartographer, and his mother was a painter and editor, both of which inspired him as an artist. He attended the Parsons School of Design, where he majored in editorial illustration. While studying, he took a year off, during which he lived in Cape Cod and explored puppetry.

Stein's books have been translated in Chinese, Korean, Japanese, Spanish, Catalan, Dutch, French, and Finnish, and his artwork has appeared in The New York Times and The New Yorker, among other major publications.

Stein has a wife and two children. They live in Kew Gardens, Queens.

== Awards and honors ==
Six of Stein's books are Junior Library Guild selections: Leaves (2007), Interrupting Chicken (2010), Dinosaur Kisses (2013), Ol’ Mama Squirrel (2013), Honey (2018), and The Worm Family Has Its Picture Taken (2021).

Leaves was named one of the best picture books of the year by Kirkus Reviews, Publishers Weekly, and School Library Journal. In 2011, Bank Street College of Education included Interrupting Chicken on their list of the best children's books for ages 5–9. Amazon named Ol' Mama Squirrel one of the best books of 2013 for ages 3–5. In 2022, The Horn Book Magazine named Don't Worry, Murray one of the best picture books of the year.

Awards for Stein's writing
Year	Title	Award	Result	Ref.
2008	Leaves	Ezra Jack Keats Book Award for New Writer	Winner	
2010	Pouch!	Charlotte Zolotow Award	Honor	
2011	Interrupting Chicken!	ALSC Notable Children's Books	Selection	
2011	Interrupting Chicken!	Golden Kite Award for Picture Book text	Honor	
2011	Interrupting Chicken!	Randolph Caldecott Medal	Honor	
2019	Honey	Charlotte Zolotow Award	Honor	
2019	Interrupting Chicken and the Elephant of Surprise	Booklist Editors' Choice: Books for Youth	Selection	
2020	Hush, Little Bunny	CLEL Bell Picture Book Awards for Sing	Nominee	

== Publications ==
=== Standalone books ===
- Leaves (G.P. Putnam's Sons Books for Young Readers, 2007, ISBN 9780399246364)
- Cowboy Ned & Andy (Paula Wiseman Books, 2006, ISBN 9781416900412)
- Monster Hug! (G.P. Putnam's Sons Books for Young Readers, 2006, ISBN 9780399246371)
- Ned's New Friend (Paula Wiseman Books, 2007, ISBN 9781416924906)
- The Nice Book (G.P. Putnam's Sons Books for Young Readers, 2008, ISBN 9780399250507)
- Pouch! (G.P. Putnam's Sons Books for Young Readers, 2009, ISBN 9780399246364)
- Love, Mouserella (Nancy Paulsen Books, 2011, ISBN 9780399254109)
- Because Amelia Smiled (Candlewick Press, 2012, ISBN 9780763641696)
- Dinosaur Kisses (Candlewick Press, 2013, ISBN 9780399250514)
- Ol' Mama Squirrel (Nancy Paulsen Books, 2013, ISBN 9780399256721)
- I'm My Own Dog (Candlewick Press, 2014, ISBN 9780763661397)
- Tad and Dad (Nancy Paulsen Books, 2015, ISBN 9780399256714)
- Ice Boy (Candlewick Press, 2017, ISBN 9780763682033)
- Honey (Nancy Paulsen Books, 2018, ISBN 9781524737863)
- Hush, Little Bunny (Balzer + Bray, 2019, ISBN 9780062845221)
- Don't Worry, Murray (Harperteen, 2022, ISBN 9780062845245)
- Beaky Barnes: Egg on the Loose (Penguin Workshop, 2023, ISBN 9780593094761)

=== Interrupting Chicken series ===
- Interrupting Chicken (Candlewick Press, 2010, ISBN 9780763641689)
- Interrupting Chicken and the Elephant of Surprise (Candlewick Press, 2018, ISBN 9780763688424)
- Interrupting Chicken: Cookies for Breakfast (Candlewick Press, 2021, ISBN 9781536207781)

=== As illustrator only ===
- The Worm Family Has Its Picture Taken, with Jennifer Frank (Anne Schwartz Books, 2021, ISBN 9780593124789)
