= Eleven Missing Days =

- Directed by: Bertie Ellwood
- Screenplay by: Ernesto Foronda
- Based on: Agatha Christie and the Eleven Missing Days by Jared Cade
- Starring: Felicity Jones; Vincent Cassel
- Production companies: Animus Films; Fortitude International; Green Light Pictures; Object & Animal; Peachtree Media Partners
- Country: United Kingdom
- Language: English

Eleven Missing Days is an upcoming British biographical mystery thriller film. Starring Felicity Jones and Vincent Cassel, the film delivers a fictionalised account of Agatha Christie's real-life eleven-day disappearance in December 1926.

== Plot ==
When crime writer Agatha Christie (Jones) goes missing, members of her family and household fall under suspicion. The investigation falls to a retired Belgian detective (Cassel) who happens to resemble Christie's famed character Hercule Poirot.

== Cast ==
- Felicity Jones as Agatha Christie
- Ben Hardy
- Alfie Allen
- Vincent Cassel as Jacques Pieters
- O-T Fagbenle as Allen Lane
- Stacy Martin
- Oliver Trevena as Monty Miller
- Ryan McParland as William Kenward
- Nicole Elizabeth Berger

== Production ==
The film was announced in May 2026, with Fortitude International shopping the project to buyers at the Cannes market.

In June, Oliver Trevena was cast as Agatha Christie's brother. Further cast were unveiled later on June 8, with filming commencing later that week. Haywards Heath was touted as a potential filming location, with London also included.

Filming wrapped in July.
