= Juliet Donenfeld =

American actress (born 2009)

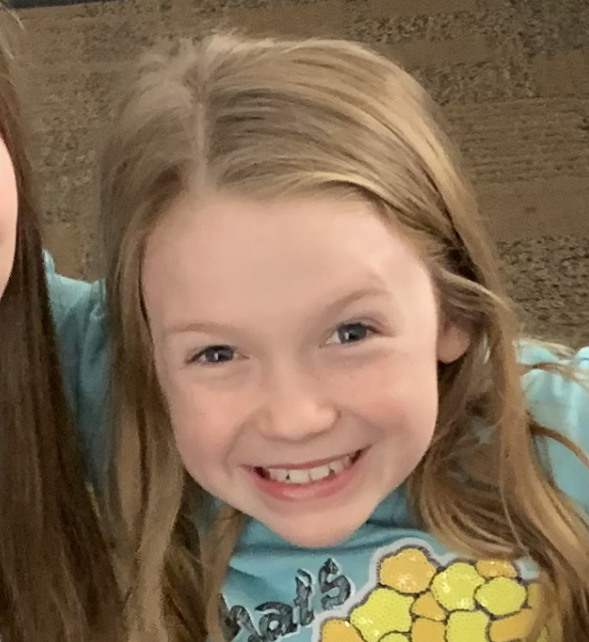
- Donenfeld in 2021
- Born: Juliet Alana Donenfeld; December 31, 2009 (age 16); Los Angeles, California
- Occupation: Actress
- Years active: 2017–present

Juliet Alana Donenfeld (born December 31, 2009) is an American actress. She is best known for her roles in The Big Show Show (2020) as J.J. Wight and in Better Call Saul (2020–2022) as Kaylee Ehrmantraut. Donenfeld has also voiced some characters in several animated films and series. Her voice work include Gabby's Dollhouse (2021–present) as Cakey, Pete the Cat (2017–2022) as Sally Squirrel and Star Wars: Young Jedi Adventures (2023–2025) as Lys Solay.

== Career ==
Donenfeld started acting at a young age appearing in commercials such McDonald's Happy Meal, Santander Bank and Amazon Echo. In 2017, she appeared in her first role in The Ranch as Nicole. She appeared in minor roles in short films, films and series. In 2018, she appeared in Good Girls (2019–2021) as young Annie and in 2020, she made her acting debut in Netflix's series The Big Show Show as J.J. Wight, Big Show's fictional younger child. She also appeared in Better Call Saul (2020–2022) as Kaylee Ehrmantraut.

Donenfeld has lent her voice in several animated films and series. Her first voice work was in Pete the Cat (2017–2022) as Sally. She also voiced Cakey in Gabby's Dollhouse (2021–present). Other voices works include additional voices in several animated films and voices works in She-Ra and the Princesses of Power (2018–2019), Blaze and the Monster Machines (2019), Interrupting Chicken (2022–2023) and Star Wars: Young Jedi Adventures (2023–2025).

In 2024, she appeared in General Hospital as Georgie Spinelli replacing her original actress, Lily Fisher. In 2025, she played Tiny Sharon in Little Angels. She also returned to voice Cakey in the film Gabby's Dollhouse: The Movie.

In August 2025, it was announced that Donenfeld would voice Jessie in Disney Jr.'s animated series, Hey A.J.!.

== Filmography ==
=== Film ===
Key
†	Denotes films that have not yet been released

Year	Title	Role	Notes
2017	The Beach Trip	Hana	Short film
2017	Diary of a Wimpy Kid: The Long Haul	ADR group	
2018	Silver Lake	Sophie	
2019	The Laundromat	Thalia	
2020	The SpongeBob Movie: Sponge on the Run	Additional voices	
2020	10 Horas para o Natal	Bia	
2021	The Boss Baby: Family Business	ADR group	
2021	The Eyes of Tammy Faye	ADR group	
2022	Chip 'n Dale: Rescue Rangers	Kid Dale (voice)	
2022	Always & Forever	Bailey	Short film
2022	Diary of a Wimpy Kid: Rodrick Rules	Additional voices	
2022	Turning Red	ADR group	
2022	Cheaper by the Dozen	ADR group	
2023	Red, White and Blue	Maddy	Short film
2023	Under the Boardwalk	Additional voices	
2023	Diary of a Wimpy Kid Christmas: Cabin Fever	Additional voices	
2023	The Magician's Elephant	ADR group	
2023	Are You There God? It's Me, Margaret.	ADR group	
2023	The Boogeyman	ADR group	
2024	Ghostbusters: Frozen Empire	ADR group	
2024	The Wild Robot	ADR group	
2024	Mufasa: The Lion King	ADR group	
2025	Little Angels	Tiny Sharon	
2025	Gabby's Dollhouse: The Movie	Cakey (voice)	

=== Television ===
Year	Title	Role	Notes
2017	The Loud House	Claire (voice)	Episode: "Pets Peeved"
2017	The Ranch	Nicole	Episode: "Last Dollar (Fly Away)"
2017–2022	Pete the Cat	Sally (voice)	Main role, 41 episodes
2018	Paprika	Olivia (voice)	Episode: "La fusée"
2018	Station 19	Lindy Dougal	Episode: "Home to Hold Onto"
2018	Jimmy Kimmel Live!	Narrator	Episode: "Michael B. Jordan/Katie Nolan"
2018–2019	She-Ra and the Princesses of Power	Little Catra (voice)	2 episodes
2018–2022	Abby Hatcher	Kid #3 (voice)	52 episodes
2019	Coop & Cami Ask the World	Little Charlotte	Uncredited, episode: "Would You Wrather Be the Heart or the Hammer?"
2019	Sydney to the Max	Morgan	Episode: "Dancin' The Vida Loca"
2019	Blaze and the Monster Machines	Peggy (voice)	Episode: "Babysitting Heroes"
2019–2021	Good Girls	Young Annie	2 episodes
2020	Game On: A Comedy Crossover Event	J.J. Wight	Episode: "The Big Show Show: The Big Games"
2020	Kipo and the Age of Wonderbeasts	Snugglemuffin (voice)	3 episodes
2020	The Big Show Show	J.J. Wight	Main role
2020–2022	Better Call Saul	Kaylee Ehrmantraut	4 episodes
2021–2022	Little Ellen	Little Helen (voice)	3 episodes
2021–present	Gabby's Dollhouse	Cakey (voice)	Main role
2022	Bee & Puppycat: Lazy in Space	Young Violet (voice)	Episode: "Funny Lying"
2022–2023	Pretzel and the Puppies	Delilah (voice)	6 episodes
2022–2023	Interrupting Chicken	Piper (voice)	Main role
2023	Stillwater	Young Manatee, Gull Sibling (voice)	Episode: "I'm Bored/Art Fair"
2023–2025	Star Wars: Young Jedi Adventures	Lys Solay (voice)	Main role
2024	Spirit Rangers	Ellie (voice)	2 episodes
2024	General Hospital	Georgie Spinelli	Episode: "Lights, Camera, Action"
2024–2026	Batman: Caped Crusader	Carrie (voice)	2 episodes
2026	Hey A.J.!	Jessie (voice)	Main role

=== Video games ===
Year	Title	Role	Notes
2018	Call of Duty: Black Ops 4	Lucy (voice)	
2019	Wattam	Voice	

== Awards and nominations ==
Award	Year	Category	Work	Result	Ref.
Annie Awards	2019	Outstanding Achievement for Voice Acting in an Animated Television / Broadcast Production	Pete the Cat	Nominated	
Daytime Emmy Awards	2021	Outstanding Performer in a Preschool Animated Program	Pete the Cat	Nominated	
Children's & Family Emmy Awards	2023	Outstanding Younger Voice Performer in an Animated or Preschool Animated Program	Interrupting Chicken	Nominated	
