= Melia =

Melia or Melie (Ancient Greek: Μελία, Μελίη) may refer to:

== Places ==
- Melia, Evros, a village in northeastern Greece
- Melia (Ionia), a Carian city destroyed by the Ionian League in early Ionia
- Melia, Nebraska, a census-designated place in Nebraska
- Mongiuffi Melia, a commune of Messina

== People and fictional characters ==
- Melia (given name)
- Melia (surname)

== Hotels ==
- Hotel Meliá, a hotel in Ponce, Puerto Rico
- Meliá Hotels International, a Spanish-owned hotel chain
- Hotel Gran Meliá Iguazú, a hotel in Argentina
- Meliá Barcelona Sarrià Hotel, a hotel in Barcelona
- Melia Grand Hermitage, a hotel in Bulgaria
- Gran Meliá Ghoo, a hotel in Iran
- Gran Meliá Don Pepe, a hotel in Marbella, Spain
- Hotel Melia Barcelona Sky, a hotel in Barcelona
- Meliá Cohiba Hotel, a hotel in Havana

== Greek mythology ==
- Melia (mythology), the name of several figures
- Melia, the singular form of Meliae, a type of nymph
- Melia (consort of Poseidon), a mythical figure
- Melia (consort of Apollo), a mythical figure
- Melia (consort of Inachus), a mythical figure

== Flora ==
- Melia (plant), a genus of trees
- Melia azedarach, a tree of the mahogany family
- Melia, a Hawaiian name for the Plumeria (frangipani) flower
- Melia dubia, the neem tree
- Meliaceae, the mahogany family

== Fauna ==
- Melia, a former genus of snout moths now synonymized with Aphomia
- Glenea melia, a species of beetle
- Adoxophyes melia, a species of moth
- Dismorphia melia, a butterfly

== See also ==
- Melia's Grocers and Tea Dealers, a 20th-century grocery store chain
- Mi'ilya, an Arab local council in the western Galilee, Israel
- Mellia (disambiguation)
