= List of Marvel Cinematic Universe film actors (The Infinity Saga) =

Film franchise actors list

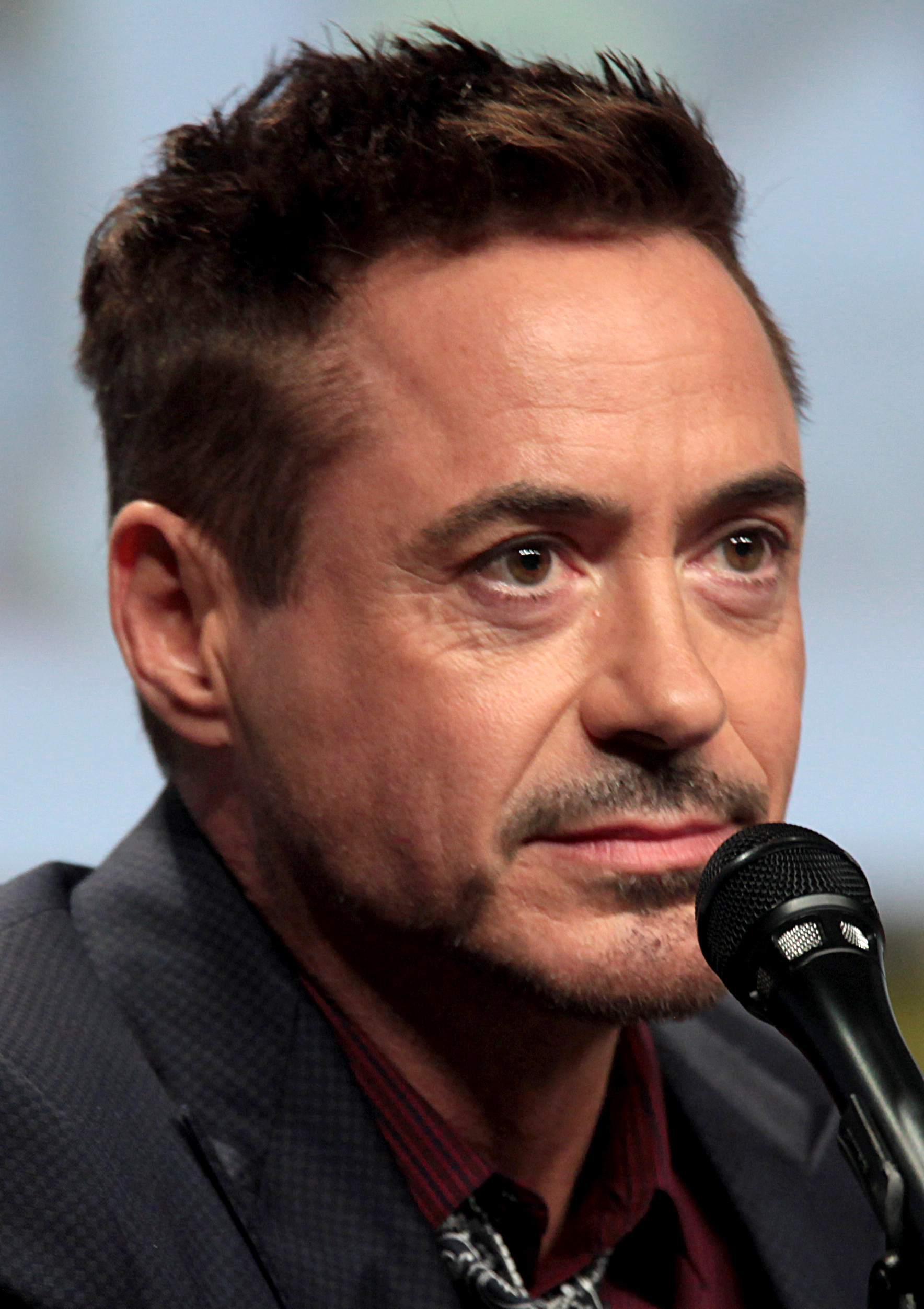
Robert Downey Jr.

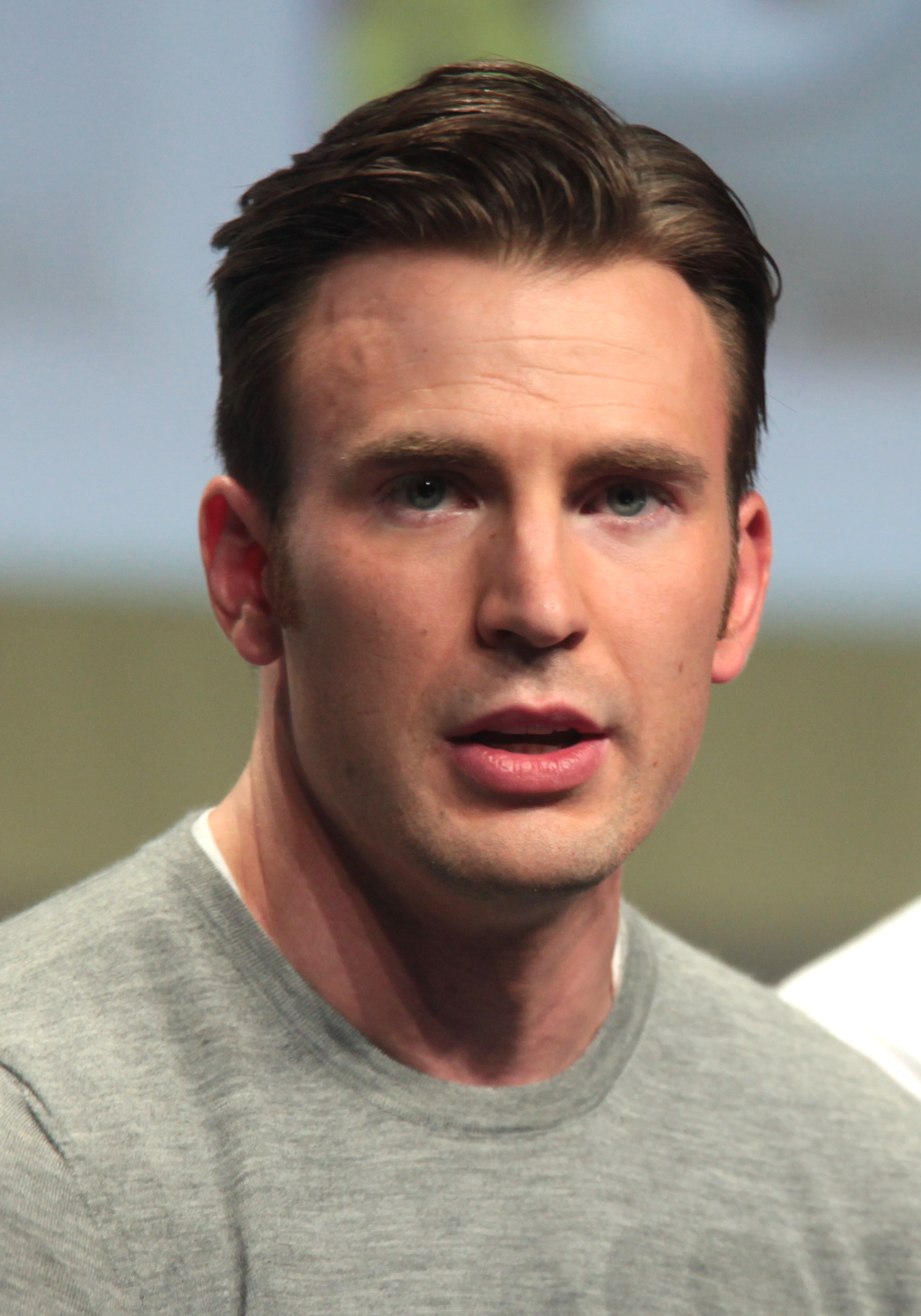
Chris Evans

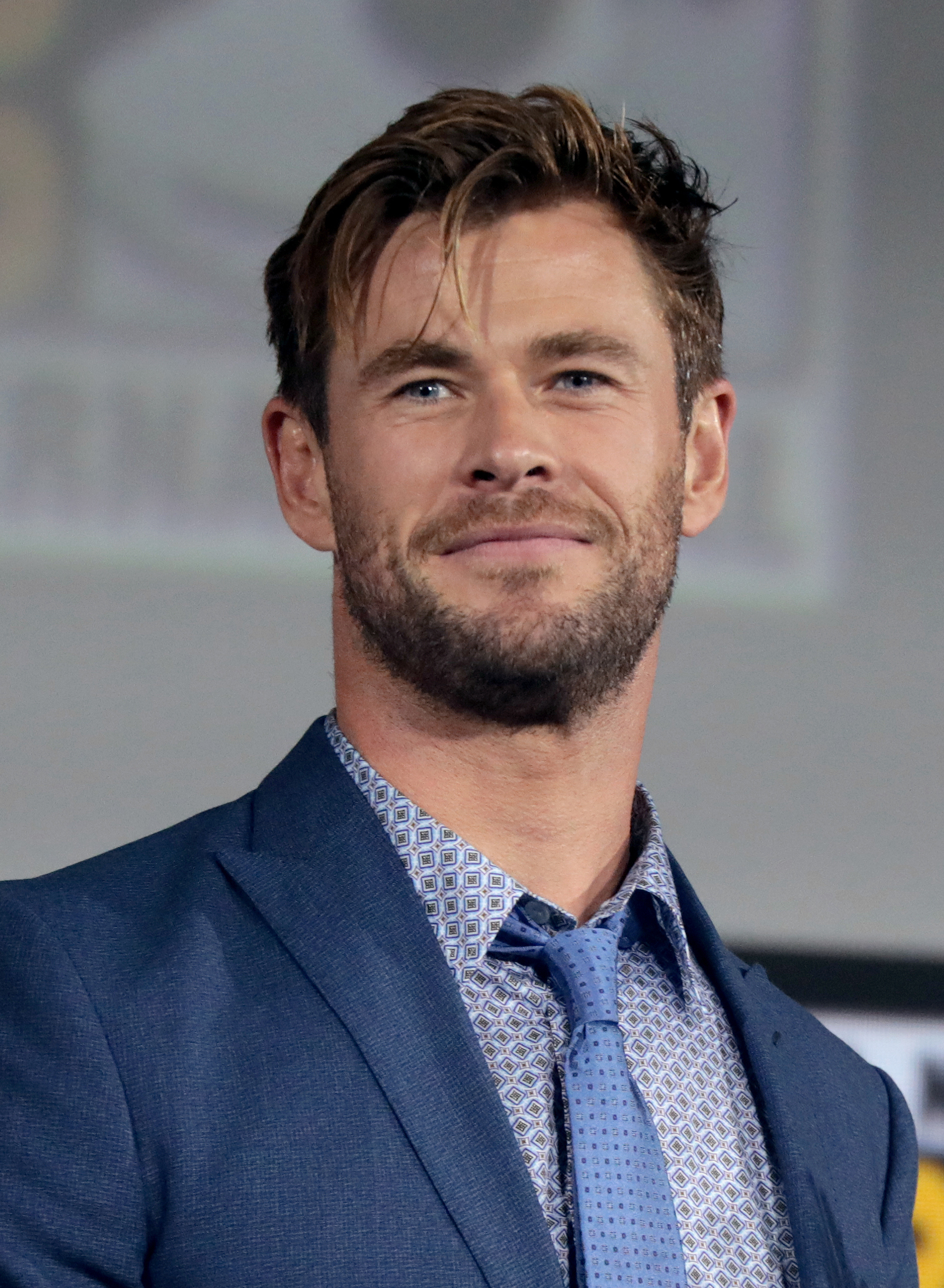
Chris Hemsworth

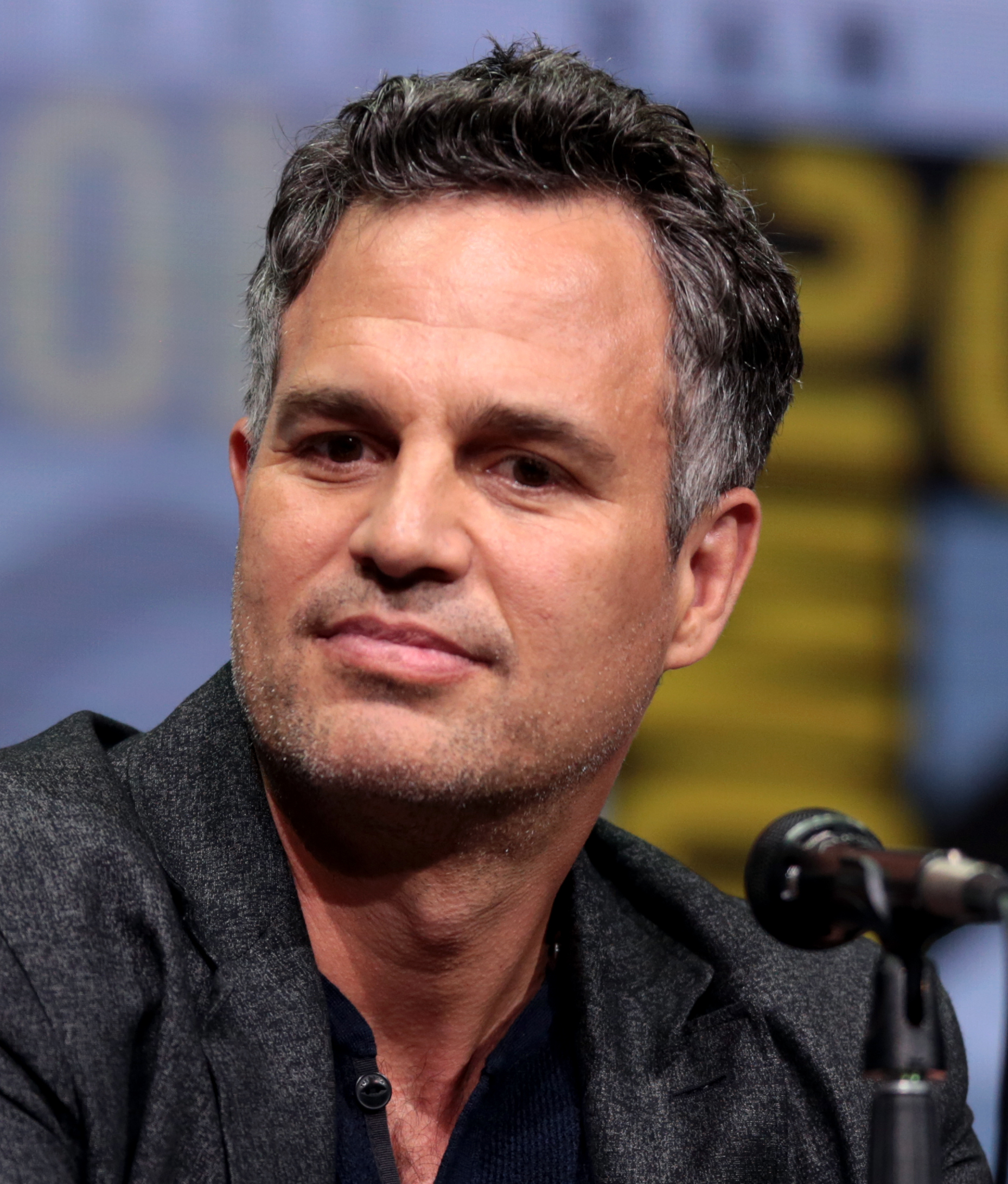
Mark Ruffalo

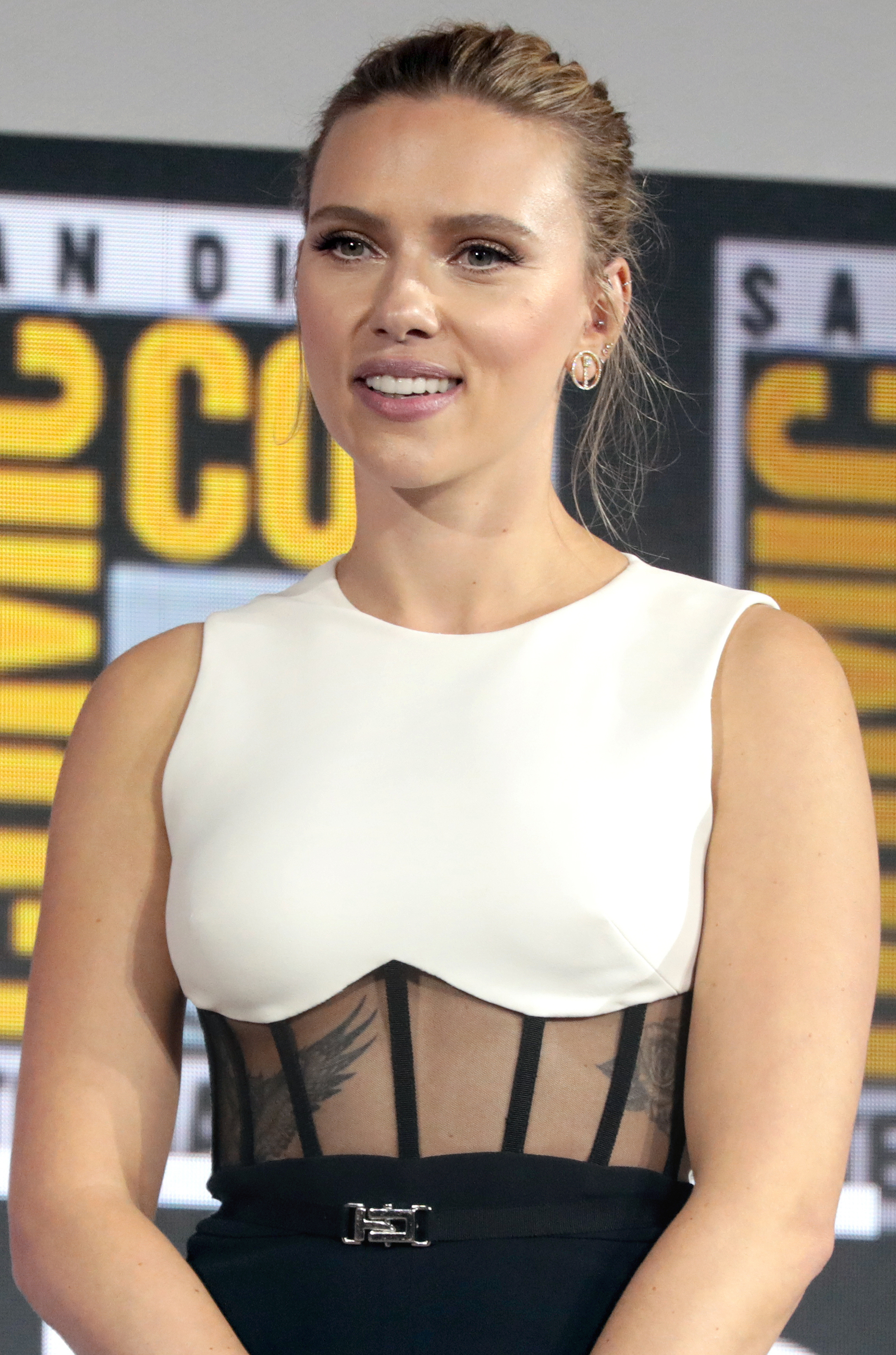
Scarlett Johansson

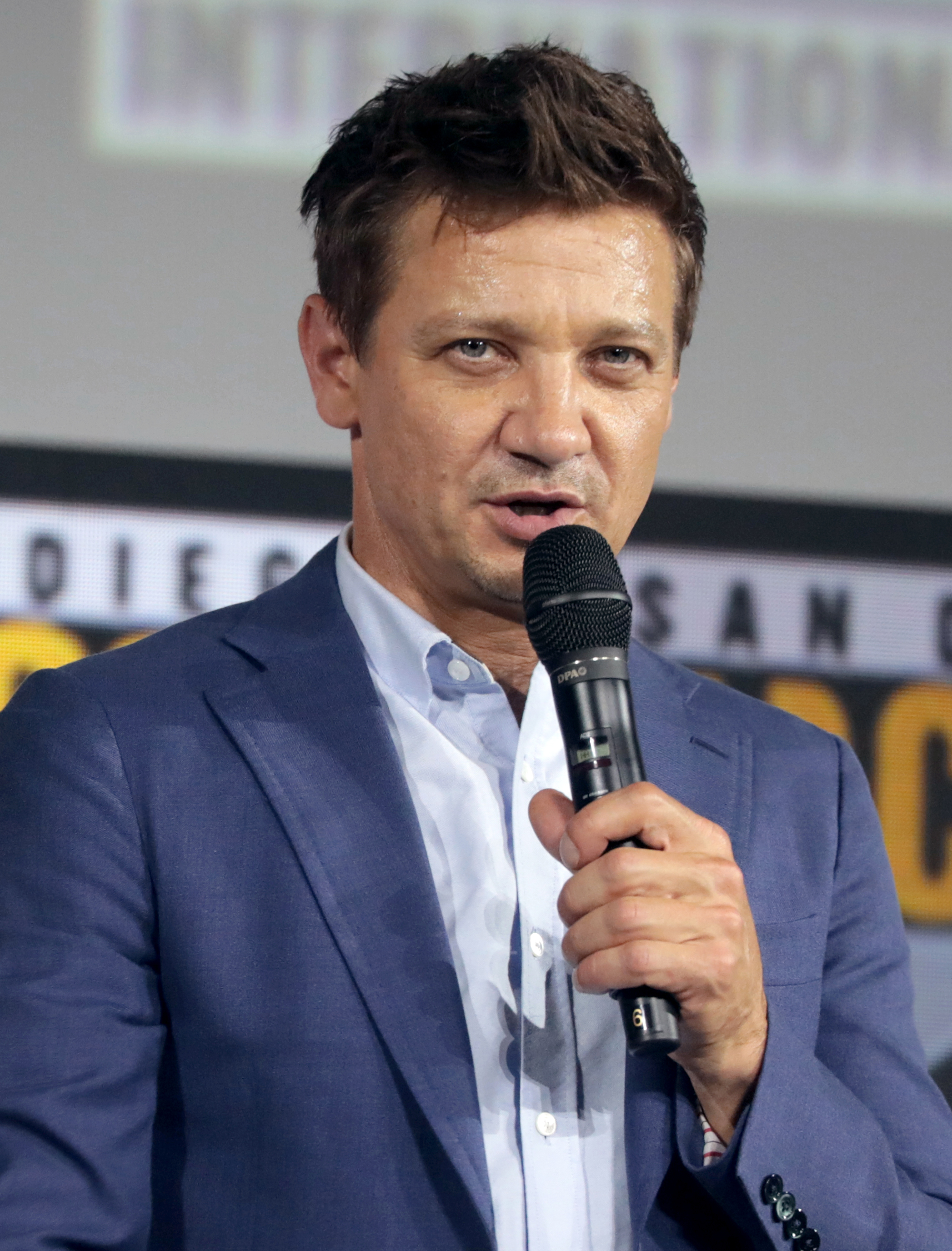
Jeremy Renner

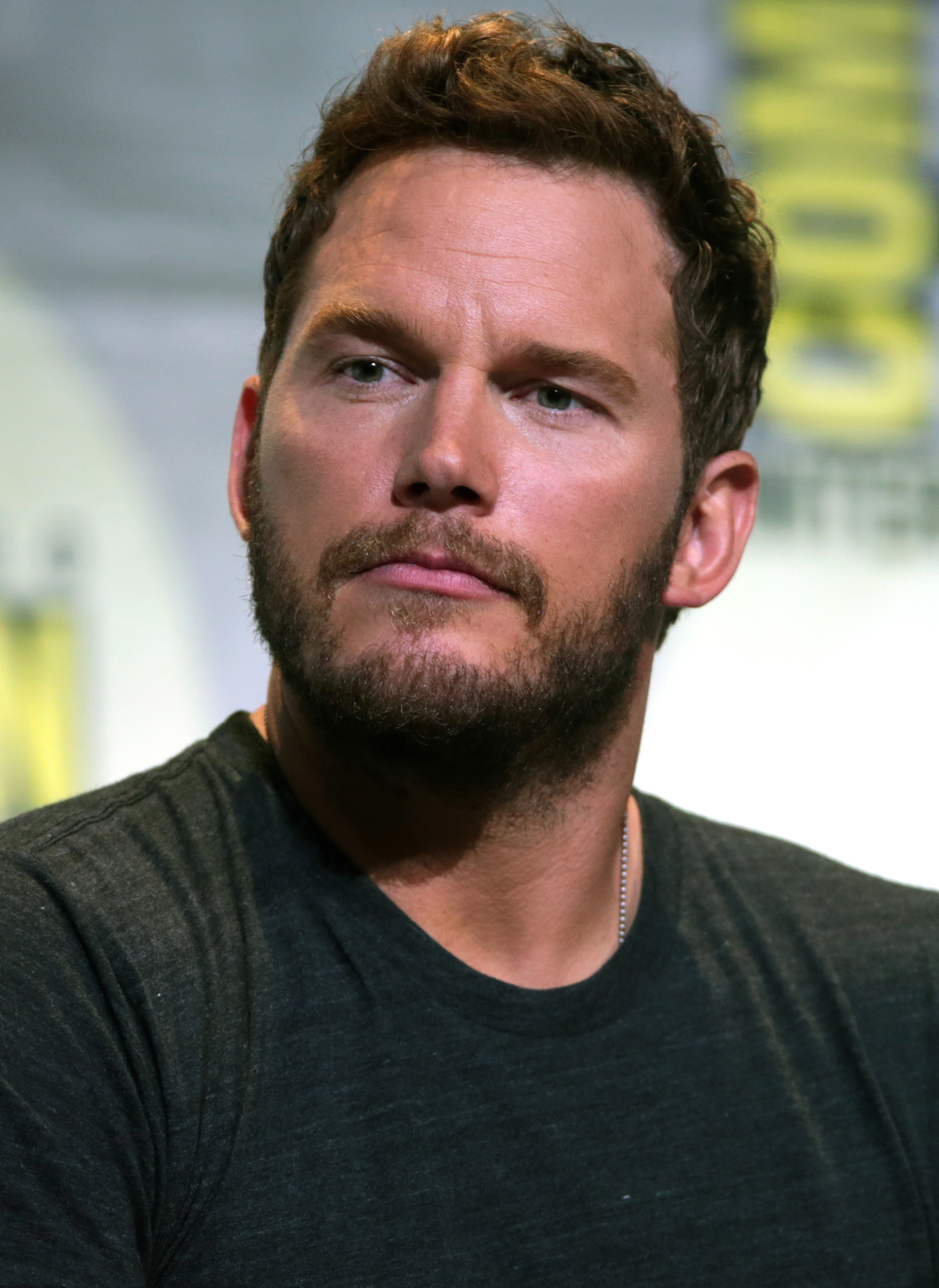
Chris Pratt

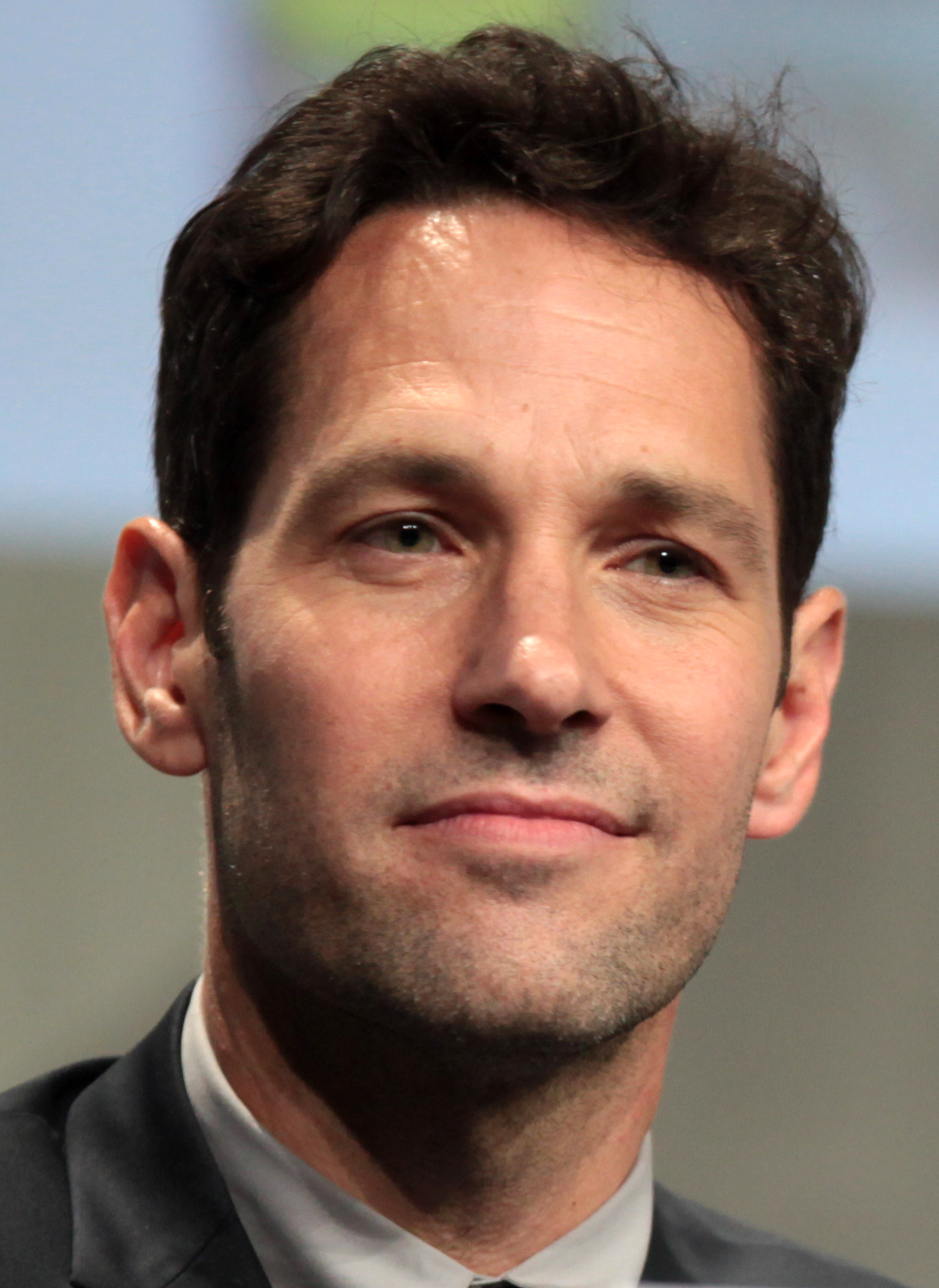
Paul Rudd

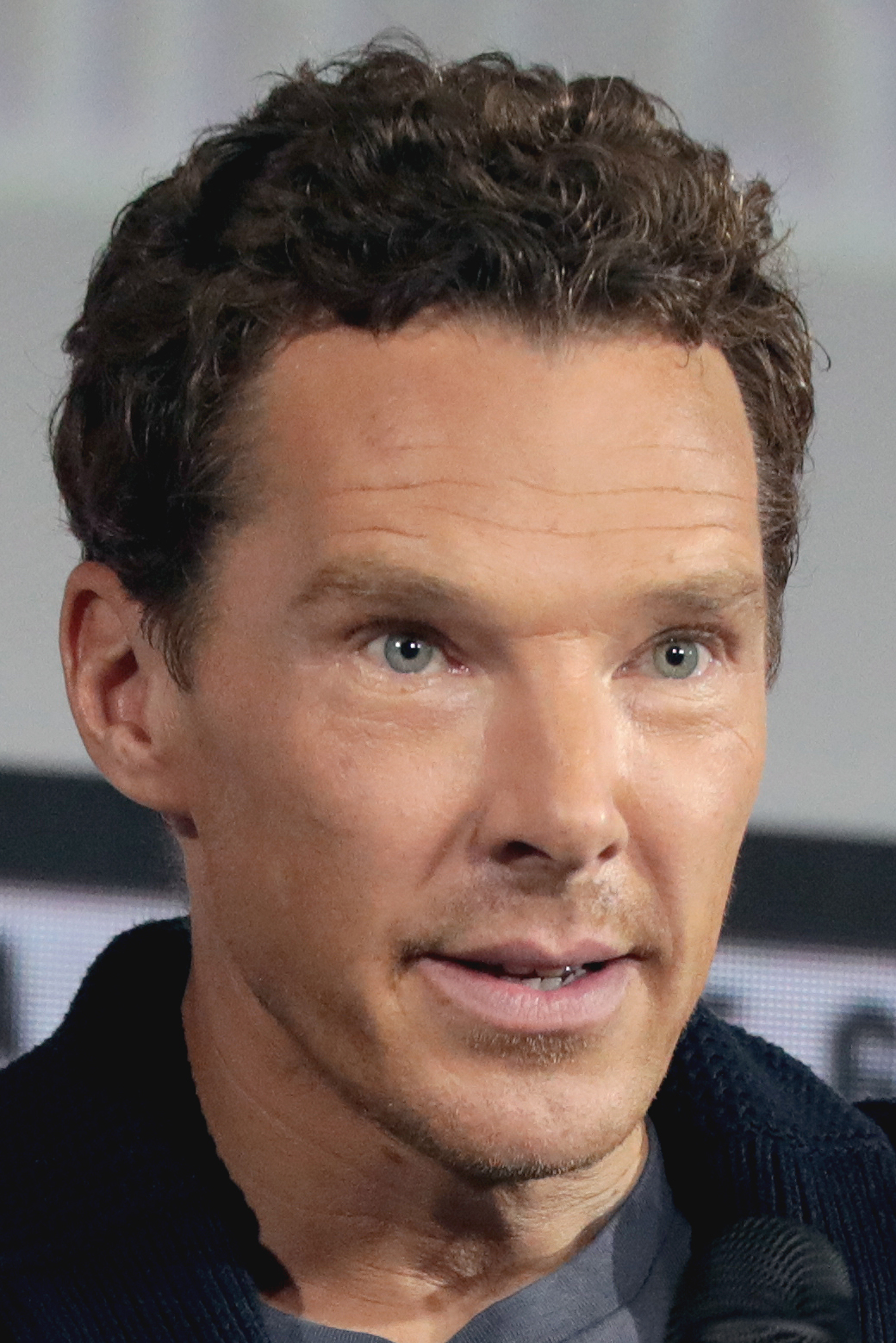
Benedict Cumberbatch

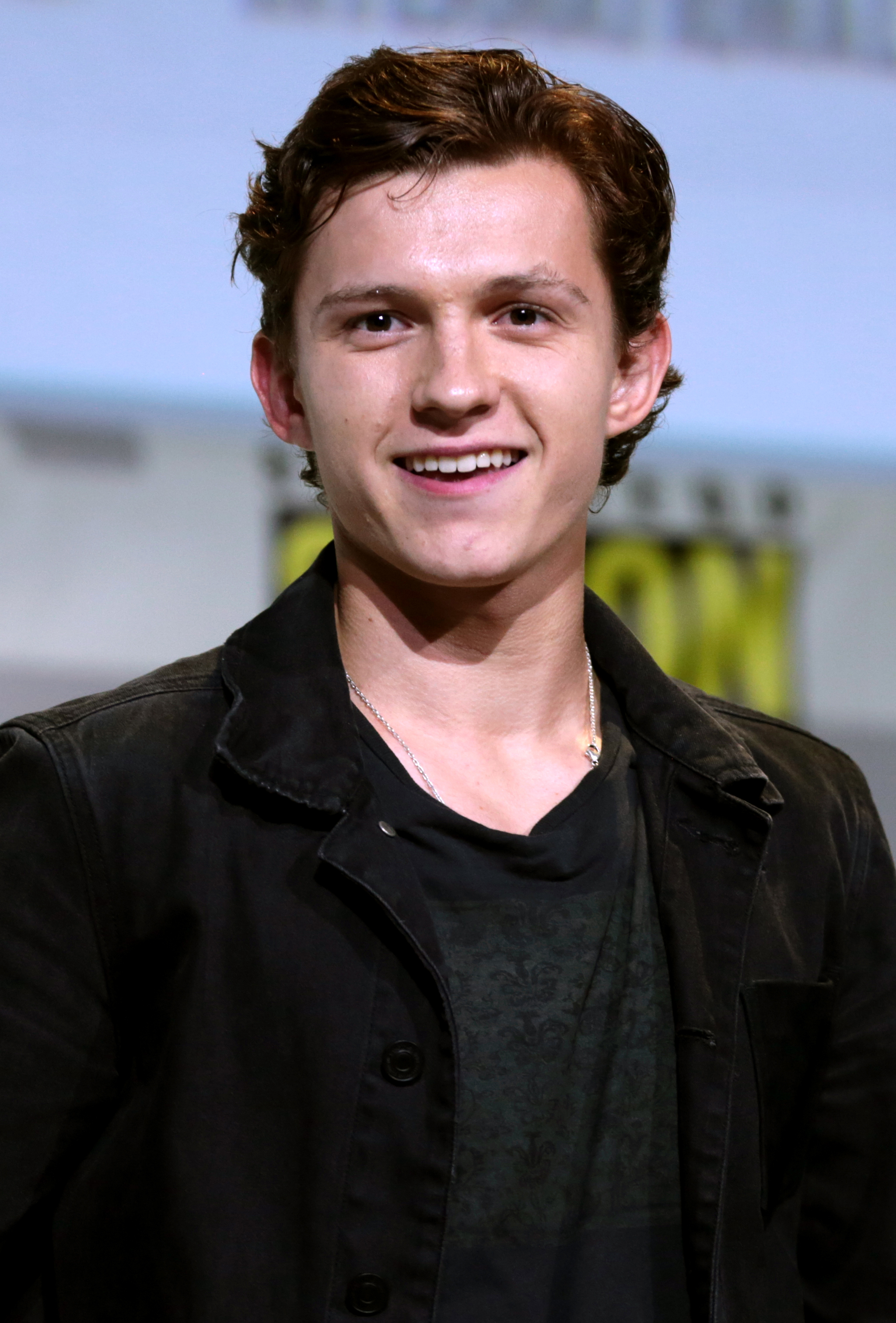
Tom Holland

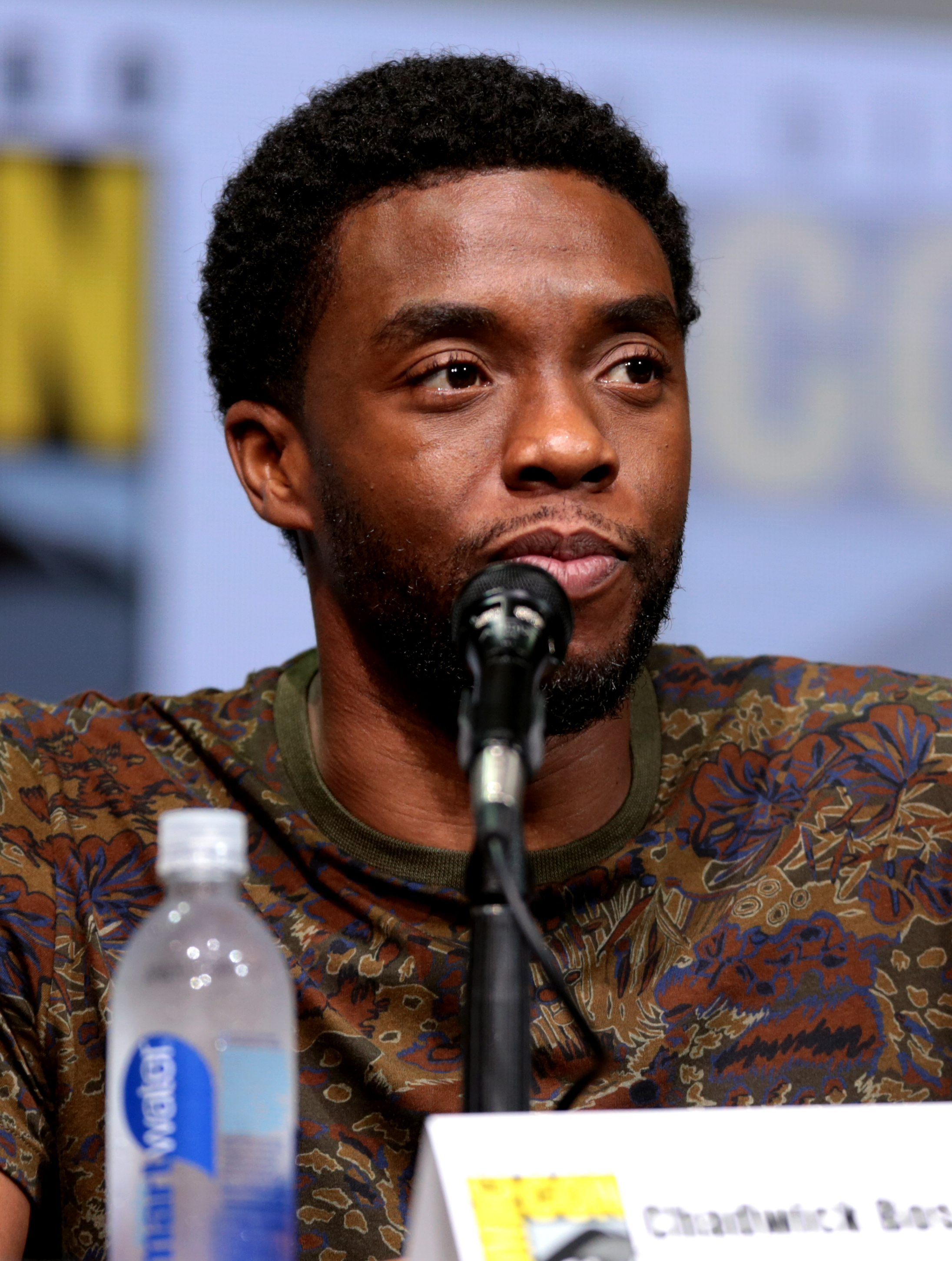
Chadwick Boseman

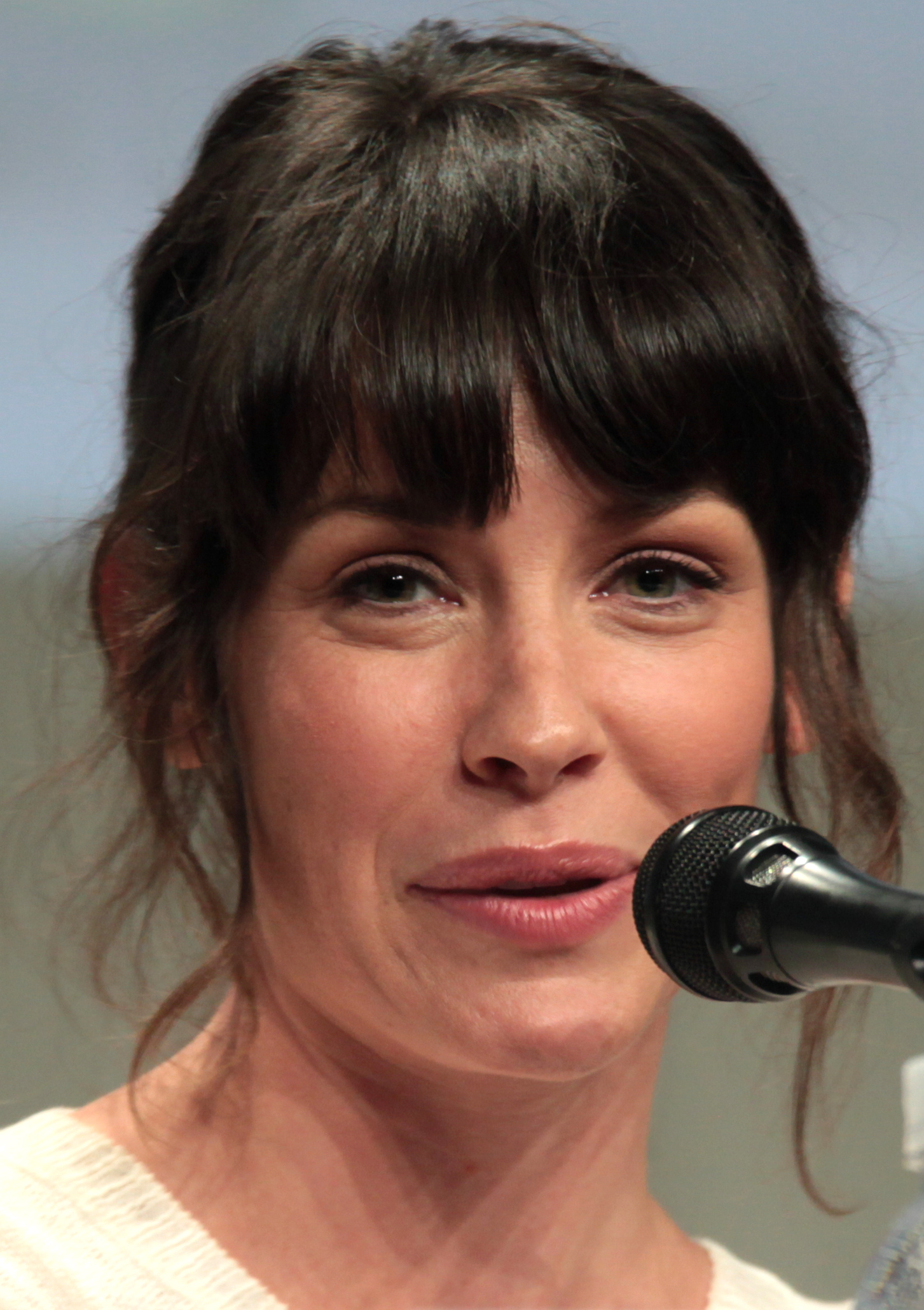
Evangeline Lilly

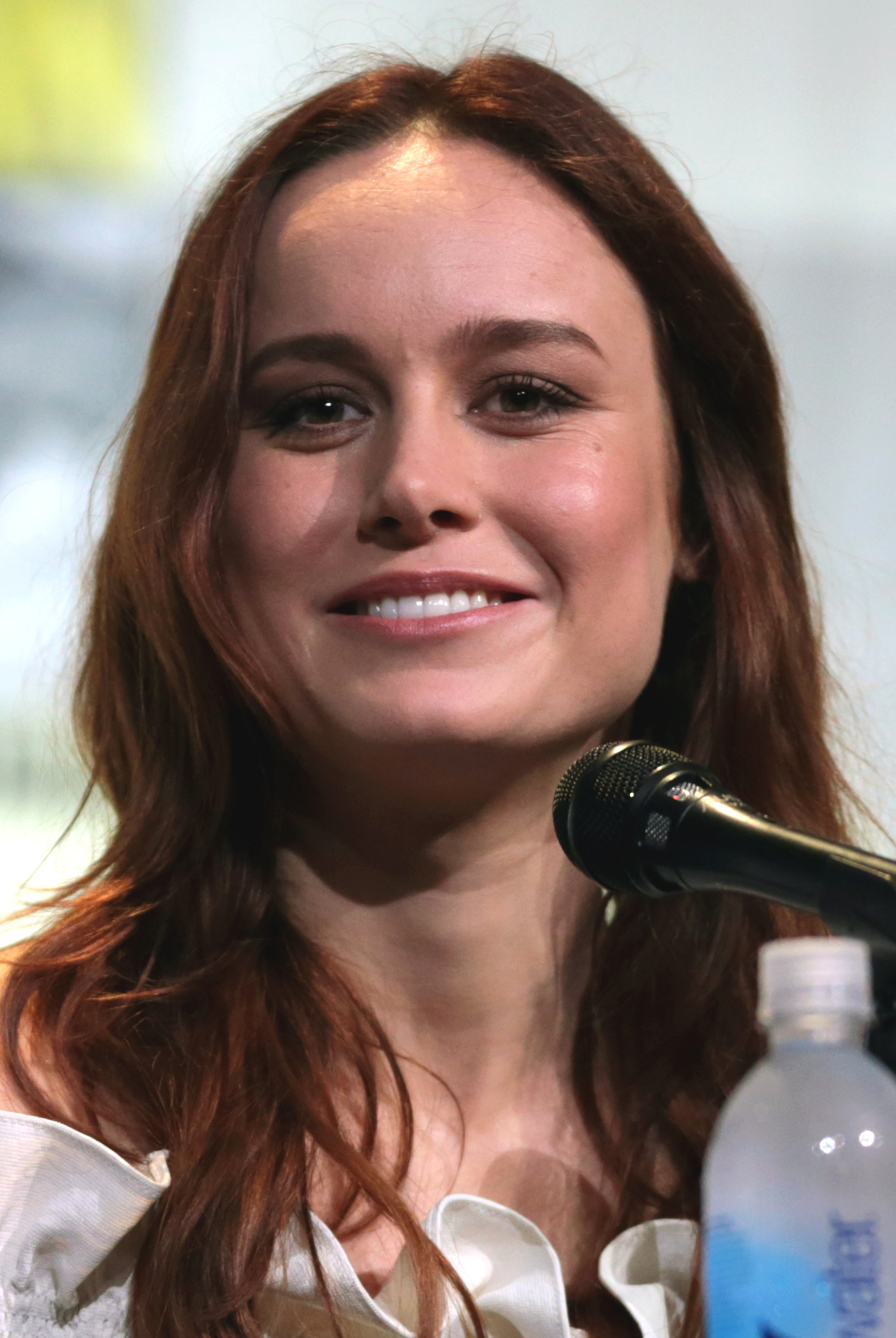
Brie Larson

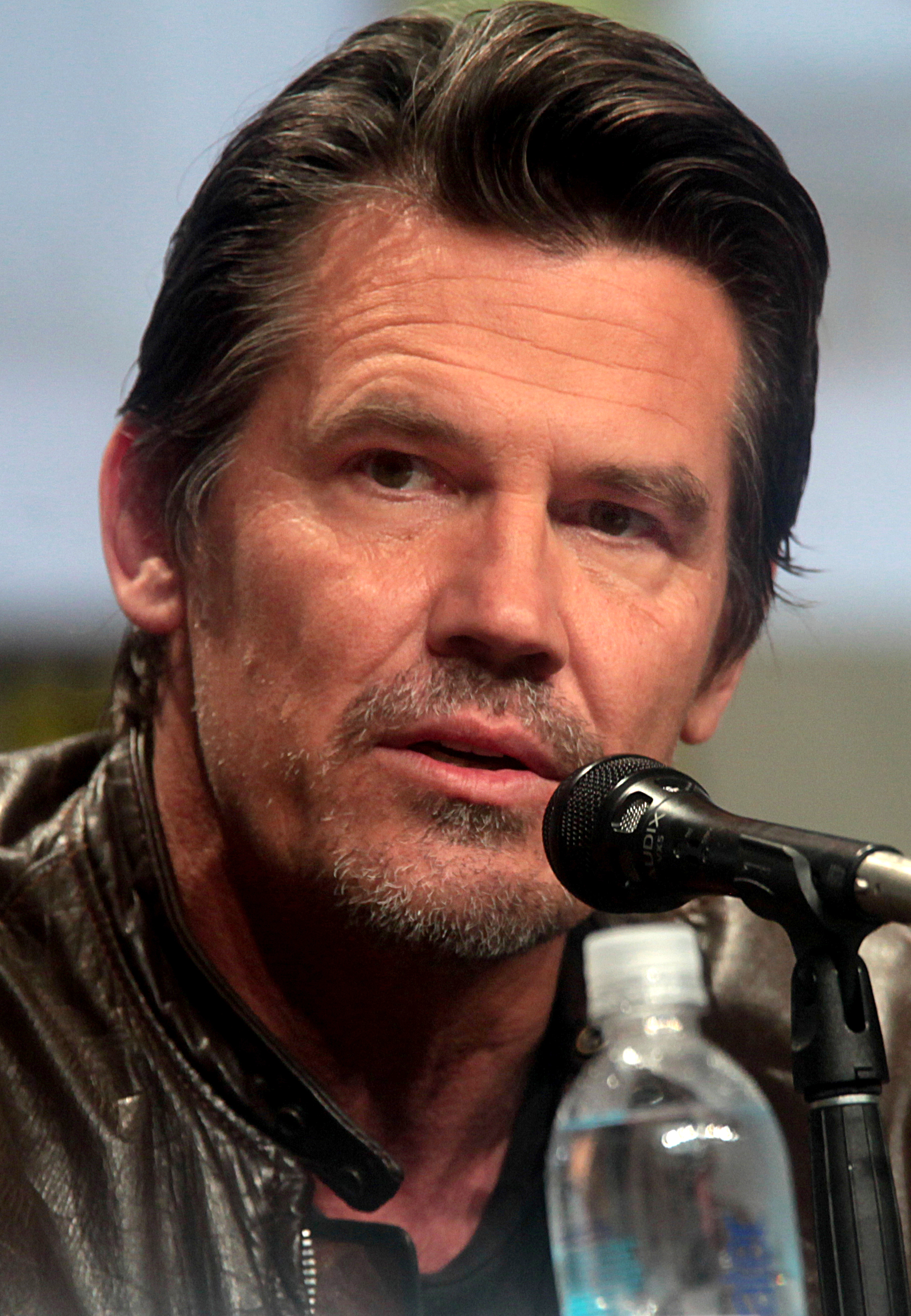
Josh Brolin

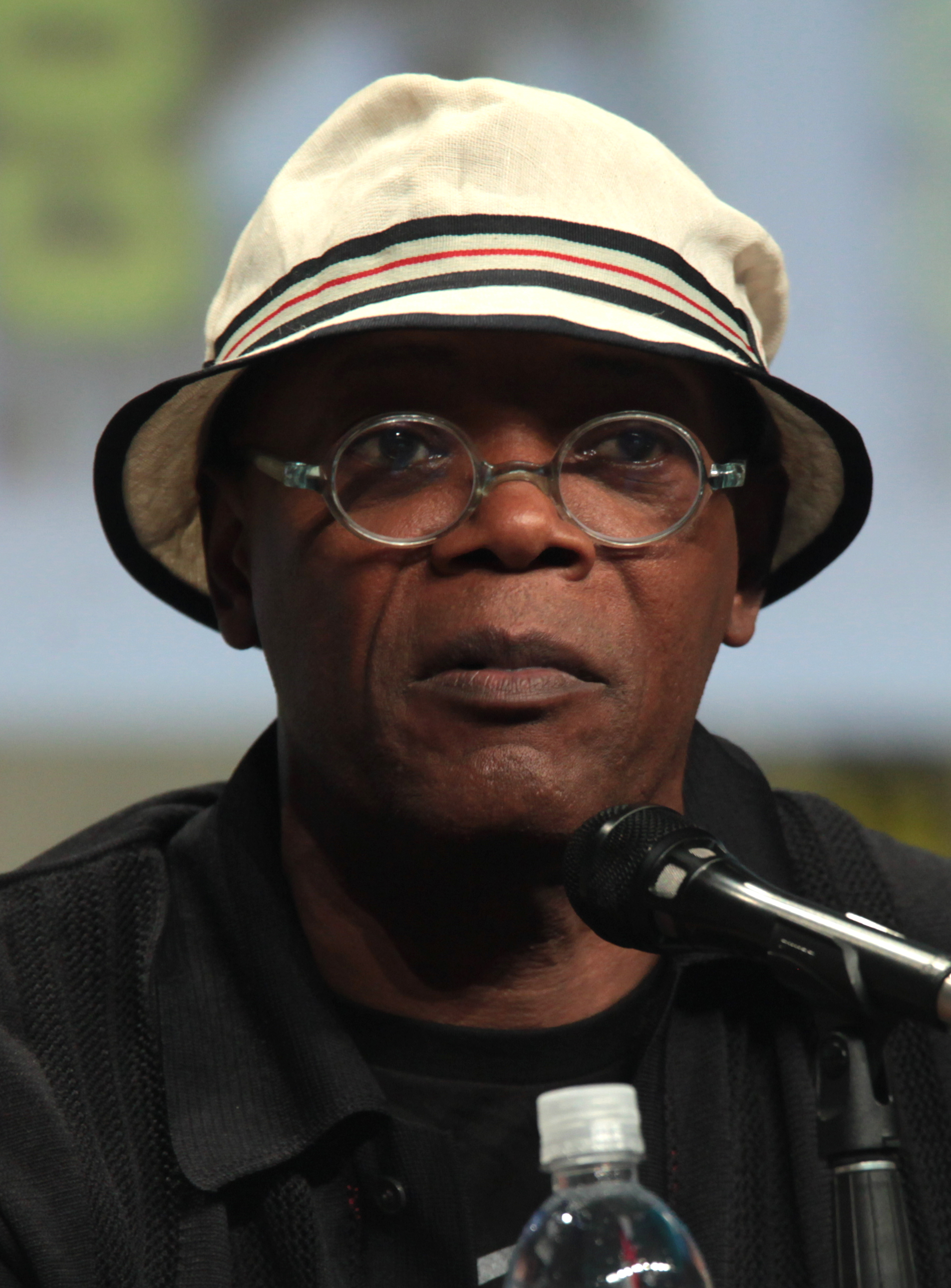
Samuel L. Jackson

Downey Jr., Evans, Hemsworth, Ruffalo, Johansson, and Renner portray the original Avengers, starring in films throughout the Infinity Saga. Also headlining their own films in the Infinity Saga are Pratt, Rudd, Cumberbatch, Holland, Boseman, Lilly, and Larson, while Brolin served as the overarching villain Thanos. Jackson had cameos and supporting roles in many of the Infinity Saga films.

The Marvel Cinematic Universe is a media franchise and shared fictional universe that is the setting of superhero films produced by Marvel Studios, based on characters that appear in Marvel Comics publications. Phase One of the franchise includes six films, featuring four different superhero properties, leading up to a crossover in the 2012 film Marvel's The Avengers. The franchise's Phase Two features three sequels to Phase One films, as well as two new film properties, and the crossover Avengers: Age of Ultron, which released in 2015. Phase Three features four sequels to earlier films, and four new film properties, as well as the crossover films Avengers: Infinity War (2018) and Avengers: Endgame (2019). The films from Phase One through Phase Three are collectively known as "The Infinity Saga".

As the franchise is composed of films adapted from a variety of Marvel Comics properties, there are multiple lead actors: Robert Downey Jr. stars as Tony Stark / Iron Man in the films Iron Man (2008), Iron Man 2 (2010), and Iron Man 3 (2013); Chris Evans portrays Steve Rogers / Captain America in Captain America: The First Avenger (2011), Captain America: The Winter Soldier (2014), and Captain America: Civil War (2016), where he is joined by Downey as Stark; and Chris Hemsworth plays Thor in Thor (2011), Thor: The Dark World (2013), and Thor: Ragnarok (2017). All three actors star in The Avengers (2012), and reprise their roles in Avengers: Age of Ultron (2015), Avengers: Infinity War (2018), and Avengers: Endgame (2019). Edward Norton headlined The Incredible Hulk (2008), playing Bruce Banner / Hulk, but did not reprise the role in future films, being replaced by Mark Ruffalo for all subsequent films involving the character. Chris Pratt portrays the lead character, Peter Quill / Star-Lord, in Guardians of the Galaxy (2014), and returns for its sequel, Guardians of the Galaxy Vol. 2 (2017), while Paul Rudd and Michael Douglas respectively star as Scott Lang / Ant-Man and Hank Pym / Ant-Man in Ant-Man (2015) and Ant-Man and the Wasp (2018), in which Evangeline Lilly co-stars as Hope van Dyne / Wasp.

Benedict Cumberbatch portrays Stephen Strange in Doctor Strange (2016), Tom Holland portrays Peter Parker / Spider-Man in Spider-Man: Homecoming (2017) and Spider-Man: Far From Home (2019), and Chadwick Boseman portrayed T'Challa / Black Panther in Black Panther (2018); Holland and Boseman were both introduced in Captain America: Civil War, which Rudd also appeared in. Downey and Evans join Holland in Spider-Man: Homecoming, while Ruffalo and Cumberbatch join Hemsworth in Thor: Ragnarok. Brie Larson portrays Carol Danvers / Captain Marvel in Captain Marvel (2019). Pratt, Cumberbatch, Holland and Boseman also appear in Avengers: Infinity War and Avengers: Endgame, with Rudd, Lilly and Larson also appearing in the latter.

Samuel L. Jackson had cameo and supporting appearances as Nick Fury in several of the early films in the franchise, before co-starring in The Avengers; he would continue to have supporting roles in later films as well. Scarlett Johansson and Jeremy Renner had supporting roles as Natasha Romanoff / Black Widow and Clint Barton / Hawkeye respectively in multiple films in the saga besides their leading roles in the Avengers films. Josh Brolin was cast as the saga's overarching villain Thanos for Guardians of the Galaxy, after the character first appeared at the end of The Avengers portrayed by Damion Poitier. Multiple other cast members recur across multiple films and series within the franchise. The list below is sorted by film and the character's surname, as some characters have been portrayed by multiple actors. All characters that have made appearances in other MCU media, such as the short films, television series, or digital series, are noted.

== Phase One ==
List indicators
This section includes characters who have appeared in the Phase.
- A dark grey cell indicates the character was not in the film.
- A ^{2} indicates the character reappears in Phase Two.
- A ^{3} indicates the character reappears in Phase Three.
- A ^{4} indicates the character reappears in a Phase Four film.
- A ^{5} indicates the character reappears in a Phase Five film.
- A ^{6} indicates the character reappears in a Phase Six film.
- A ^{C} indicates an uncredited cameo role.
- A ^{DS} indicates the character appears in a digital series.
- An ^{MS} indicates the character appears in a Marvel Studios television series.
- An ^{MT} indicates the character appears in a Marvel Television series.
- An ^{OS} indicates the character appears in a One-Shot.
- A ^{P} indicates an appearance in onscreen photographs.
- A ^{V} indicates a voice-only role.

Character	2008		2010	2011		2012
Character	Iron Man	The Incredible Hulk	Iron Man 2	Thor	Captain America: The First Avenger	Marvel's The Avengers
=== Introduced in Iron Man ===
Phil Coulson^{3} ^{DS} ^{MT} ^{OS}	Clark Gregg		Clark Gregg	Clark Gregg		Clark Gregg
Christine Everhart^{DS}	Leslie Bibb		Leslie Bibb			
Nick Fury^{2} ^{3} ^{5} ^{MS} ^{MT}	Samuel L. Jackson^{C}		Samuel L. Jackson	Samuel L. Jackson^{C}	Samuel L. Jackson	Samuel L. Jackson
Harold "Happy" Hogan^{2} ^{3} ^{4} ^{5}	Jon Favreau		Jon Favreau			
J.A.R.V.I.S.^{2}	Paul Bettany^{V}		Paul Bettany^{V}			Paul Bettany^{V}
Virginia "Pepper" Potts^{2} ^{3}	Gwyneth Paltrow		Gwyneth Paltrow			Gwyneth Paltrow
Raza^{MS}	Faran Tahir					
James "Rhodey" Rhodes^{2} ^{3} ^{MS}	Terrence Howard		Don Cheadle			
William Ginter Riva^{3}	Peter Billingsley					
Obadiah Stane	Jeff Bridges					
Howard Stark^{2} ^{3} ^{MT} ^{OS}	Gerard Sanders^{P}		John Slattery		Dominic Cooper	
Tony Stark Iron Man^{2} ^{3}	Robert Downey Jr.	Robert Downey Jr.^{C}	Robert Downey Jr.			Robert Downey Jr.
Ho Yinsen^{2}	Shaun Toub					
=== Introduced in The Incredible Hulk ===
Bruce Banner Hulk^{2} ^{3} ^{4} ^{6} ^{MS}		Edward Norton Lou Ferrigno^{V}				Mark Ruffalo
Emil Blonsky Abomination^{4} ^{MS}		Tim Roth				
Roger Harrington^{3} ^{4}		Martin Starr				
Betty Ross^{5}		Liv Tyler				
Thaddeus "Thunderbolt" Ross^{3} ^{4} ^{5}		William Hurt				
Leonard Samson		Ty Burrell				
Samuel Sterns^{5}		Tim Blake Nelson				
=== Introduced in Iron Man 2 ===
Justin Hammer^{OS}			Sam Rockwell			
Chess Roberts			Olivia Munn			
Natasha Romanoff Natalie Rushman / Black Widow^{2} ^{3} ^{4}			Scarlett Johansson			Scarlett Johansson
Stern^{2}			Garry Shandling			
Anton Vanko^{MT}			Yevgeni Lazarev			
Ivan Vanko Whiplash			Mickey Rourke			
=== Introduced in Thor ===
Clint Barton Hawkeye^{2} ^{3} ^{4} ^{MS}				Jeremy Renner^{C}		Jeremy Renner
Fandral^{2} ^{3}				Josh Dallas		
Jane Foster^{2} ^{3} ^{4}				Natalie Portman		
Frigga^{2} ^{3}				Rene Russo		
Heimdall^{2} ^{3} ^{4}				Idris Elba		
Hogun^{2} ^{3}				Tadanobu Asano		
Laufey				Colm Feore		
Darcy Lewis^{2} ^{4} ^{MS}				Kat Dennings		
Loki^{2} ^{3}				Tom Hiddleston		Tom Hiddleston
Odin^{2} ^{3}				Anthony Hopkins		
Erik Selvig^{2} ^{4}				Stellan Skarsgård		Stellan Skarsgård
Sif^{2} ^{4} ^{MS} ^{MT}				Jaimie Alexander		
Jasper Sitwell^{2} ^{3} ^{OS} ^{MT}				Maximiliano Hernández		Maximiliano Hernández
Thor^{2} ^{3} ^{4} ^{6}				Chris Hemsworth		Chris Hemsworth
Volstagg^{2} ^{3}				Ray Stevenson		
=== Introduced in Captain America: The First Avenger ===
James "Bucky" Barnes^{2} ^{3} ^{5} ^{MS}					Sebastian Stan	
Brandt					Michael Brandon	
Peggy Carter^{2} ^{3} ^{OS} ^{MT}					Hayley Atwell	
Jacques Dernier					Bruno Ricci	
Timothy "Dum Dum" Dugan^{OS} ^{MT}					Neal McDonough	
Abraham Erskine					Stanley Tucci	
James Montgomery Falsworth					JJ Feild	
Gilmore Hodge					Lex Shrapnel	
Gabe Jones					Derek Luke	
Heinz Kruger					Richard Armitage	
Jim Morita^{MT}					Kenneth Choi	
Chester Phillips					Tommy Lee Jones	
Steve Rogers Captain America^{2} ^{3} ^{6}					Chris Evans	Chris Evans
Johann Schmidt Red Skull^{3}					Hugo Weaving	
Arnim Zola^{2} ^{MT}					Toby Jones	
=== Introduced in Marvel's The Avengers ===
Beth						Ashley Johnson
Hawley^{2}						Jenny Agutter
Maria Hill^{2} ^{3} ^{5} ^{MS} ^{MT}						Cobie Smulders
Georgi Luchkov						Jerzy Skolimowski
Gideon Malick^{MT}						Powers Boothe
Thanos^{2} ^{3}						Damion Poitier
The Other^{2}						Alexis Denisof

== Phase Two ==
List indicators
This section includes characters who have appeared in the Phase.
- A dark grey cell indicates the character was not in the film.
- A ^{3} indicates the character reappears in Phase Three.
- A ^{4} indicates the character reappears in a Phase Four film.
- A ^{5} indicates the character reappears in a Phase Five film.
- A ^{6} indicates the character reappears in a Phase Six film.
- A ^{C} indicates an uncredited cameo role.
- A ^{DS} indicates the character appears in a digital series.
- An ^{MS} indicates the character appears in a Marvel Studios television series.
- An ^{MT} indicates the character appears in a Marvel Television series.
- An ^{OS} indicates the character appears in a One-Shot.
- An ^{SP} indicates the character appears in a Marvel Studios Special Presentation.
- A ^{V} indicates a voice-only role.

Character	2013		2014		2015	
Character	Iron Man 3	Thor: The Dark World	Captain America: The Winter Soldier	Guardians of the Galaxy	Avengers: Age of Ultron	Ant-Man
=== Introduced in Phase One ===
Bruce Banner Hulk^{3} ^{4} ^{MS}	Mark Ruffalo^{C}				Mark Ruffalo	
James "Bucky" Barnes Winter Soldier^{3} ^{5} ^{6} ^{MS}			Sebastian Stan			Sebastian Stan^{C}
Clint Barton Hawkeye^{3} ^{4} ^{MS}					Jeremy Renner	
Peggy Carter^{3} ^{MT} ^{OS}			Hayley Atwell		Hayley Atwell	Hayley Atwell
Fandral^{3}		Zachary Levi				
Jane Foster^{3} ^{4}		Natalie Portman				
Frigga^{3}		Rene Russo				
Nick Fury^{3} ^{5} ^{MS} ^{MT}			Samuel L. Jackson		Samuel L. Jackson	
Hawley			Jenny Agutter			
Heimdall^{3} ^{4}		Idris Elba			Idris Elba	
Maria Hill^{3} ^{5} ^{MS} ^{MT}			Cobie Smulders		Cobie Smulders	
Harold "Happy" Hogan^{3} ^{4}	Jon Favreau					
Hogun^{3}		Tadanobu Asano				
J.A.R.V.I.S.	Paul Bettany^{V}				Paul Bettany^{V}	
Darcy Lewis^{4} ^{MS}		Kat Dennings				
Loki^{3}		Tom Hiddleston				
Odin^{3}		Anthony Hopkins				
Virginia "Pepper" Potts^{3}	Gwyneth Paltrow					
James "Rhodey" Rhodes War Machine / Iron Patriot^{3} ^{MS}	Don Cheadle				Don Cheadle	
Steve Rogers Captain America^{3} ^{6}		Chris Evans^{C} (Note: Chris Evans makes a cameo appearance in Thor: The Dark World as Loki masquerading as Captain America.)	Chris Evans		Chris Evans	Chris Evans^{C}
Natasha Romanoff Black Widow^{3} ^{4}			Scarlett Johansson		Scarlett Johansson	
Erik Selvig^{4}		Stellan Skarsgård			Stellan Skarsgård	
Sif^{4} ^{MS} ^{MT}		Jaimie Alexander				
Jasper Sitwell^{3} ^{MT} ^{OS}			Maximiliano Hernández			
Howard Stark^{3} ^{MT} ^{OS}						John Slattery
Tony Stark Iron Man^{3}	Robert Downey Jr.				Robert Downey Jr.	
Stern			Garry Shandling			
Thanos^{3}				Josh Brolin^{C}	Josh Brolin^{C}	
The Other				Alexis Denisof		
Thor^{3} ^{4} ^{6}		Chris Hemsworth			Chris Hemsworth	
Volstagg^{3}		Ray Stevenson				
Ho Yinsen	Shaun Toub					
Arnim Zola^{MT}			Toby Jones			
=== Introduced in Iron Man 3 ===
Ellen Brandt	Stéphanie Szostak					
Matthew Ellis^{MT} ^{DS}	William Sadler					
Maya Hansen	Rebecca Hall					
Harley Keener^{3}	Ty Simpkins					
Aldrich Killian	Guy Pearce					
Rodriguez	Miguel Ferrer					
Eric Savin	James Badge Dale					
Trevor Slattery^{4} ^{MS} ^{OS}	Ben Kingsley					
Jack Taggart	Ashley Hamilton					
Wu	Wang Xueqi					
=== Introduced in Thor: The Dark World ===
Algrim Kurse		Adewale Akinnuoye-Agbaje				
Bor		Tony Curran				
Ian Boothby		Jonathan Howard				
Carina		Ophelia Lovibond^{C}		Ophelia Lovibond		
Eir		Alice Krige				
Malekith		Christopher Eccleston				
Richard		Chris O'Dowd				
Taneleer Tivan The Collector^{3}		Benicio del Toro^{C}		Benicio del Toro		
Tyr		Clive Russell				
=== Introduced in Captain America: The Winter Soldier ===
Georges Batroc^{MS}			Georges St-Pierre			
Sharon Carter Agent 13^{3} ^{MS}			Emily VanCamp			
Cameron Klein			Aaron Himelstein		Aaron Himelstein	
List^{MT}			Henry Goodman^{C}		Henry Goodman	
Pietro Maximoff^{MS}			Aaron Taylor-Johnson^{C}		Aaron Taylor-Johnson	
Wanda Maximoff^{3} ^{4} ^{MS}			Elizabeth Olsen^{C}		Elizabeth Olsen	
Alexander Pierce^{3}			Robert Redford			
Jack Rollins^{3} ^{MS}			Callan Mulvey			
Brock Rumlow^{3} ^{MS}			Frank Grillo			
Wolfgang von Strucker^{MT}			Thomas Kretschmann^{C}		Thomas Kretschmann	
Sam Wilson Falcon^{3} ^{5} ^{6} ^{MS}			Anthony Mackie		Anthony Mackie	Anthony Mackie
=== Introduced in Guardians of the Galaxy ===
Bereet				Melia Kreiling		
Broker^{5}				Christopher Fairbank		
Cosmo the Spacedog^{5} ^{SP}				Fred^{C}		
Rhomann Dey				John C. Reilly		
Drax the Destroyer^{3} ^{4} ^{5} ^{SP}				Dave Bautista		
Gamora^{3}				Zoe Saldaña		
Groot^{3} ^{4} ^{5} ^{SP}				Vin Diesel^{V}		
Howard the Duck^{3} ^{5}				Seth Green^{V} ^{C}		
Korath^{3}				Djimon Hounsou		
Kraglin Obfonteri^{3} ^{4} ^{5} ^{SP}				Sean Gunn		
Nebula^{3} ^{4} ^{5} ^{SP}				Karen Gillan		
Meredith Quill^{3}				Laura Haddock		
Jason Quill^{3} ^{5}				Gregg Henry		
Peter Quill Star-Lord^{3} ^{4} ^{5} ^{SP}				Chris Pratt		
Irani Rael Nova Prime				Glenn Close		
Rocket^{3} ^{4} ^{5} ^{SP}				Bradley Cooper^{V} Sean Gunn^{MC}		
Ronan the Accuser^{3}				Lee Pace		
Garthan Saal				Peter Serafinowicz		
Yondu Udonta^{3} ^{5} ^{SP}				Michael Rooker		
=== Introduced in Avengers: Age of Ultron ===
Cooper Barton^{3} ^{MS}					Ben Sakamoto	
Laura Barton^{3} ^{MS}					Linda Cardellini	
Lila Barton^{3} ^{MS}					Isabella and Imogen Poynton	
Helen Cho					Claudia Kim	
F.R.I.D.A.Y.^{3}					Kerry Condon^{V}	
Ulysses Klaue^{3}					Andy Serkis	
Ultron					James Spader	
Vision^{3} ^{MS}					Paul Bettany	
=== Introduced in Ant-Man ===
Mitchell Carson						Martin Donovan
Darren Cross Yellowjacket^{5} ^{DS}						Corey Stoll
Dale^{5}						Gregg Turkington
Dave^{3}						Tip "T.I." Harris
Gale						Wood Harris
Kurt^{3}						David Dastmalchian
Cassie Lang^{3} ^{5}						Abby Ryder Fortson
Scott Lang Ant-Man^{3} ^{5} ^{DS}						Paul Rudd
Luis^{3}						Michael Peña
Maggie^{3}						Judy Greer
Jim Paxton^{3}						Bobby Cannavale
Hank Pym Ant-Man^{3} ^{5}						Michael Douglas
Hope van Dyne^{3} ^{5}						Evangeline Lilly
Janet van Dyne Wasp^{3} ^{5}						Hayley Lovitt

== Phase Three ==
List indicators
This section includes characters who have appeared in the Phase.
- A dark grey cell indicates the character was not in the film.
- A ^{4} indicates the character reappears in a Phase Four film.
- A ^{5} indicates the character reappears in a Phase Five film.
- A ^{6} indicates the character reappears in a Phase Six film.
- An ^{A} indicates an appearance through archival footage.
- A ^{C} indicates an uncredited cameo role.
- A ^{DS} indicates the character appears in a digital series.
- An ^{MC} indicates a motion-capture-only role.
- An ^{MS} indicates the character appears in a Marvel Studios television series.
- An ^{MT} indicates the character appears in a Marvel Television series.
- An ^{OS} indicates the character appears in a One-Shot.
- An ^{SP} indicates the character appears in a Marvel Studios Special Presentation.
- A ^{V} indicates a voice-only role.
- A ^{Y} indicates a younger version of the character.

Character	2016		2017			2018			2019		
Character	Captain America: Civil War	Doctor Strange	Guardians of the Galaxy Vol. 2	Spider-Man: Homecoming	Thor: Ragnarok	Black Panther	Avengers: Infinity War	Ant-Man and the Wasp	Captain Marvel	Avengers: Endgame	Spider-Man: Far From Home
=== Introduced in Phase One ===
Bruce Banner Hulk^{4} ^{MS}					Mark Ruffalo		Mark Ruffalo		Mark Ruffalo^{C}	Mark Ruffalo	
James "Bucky" Barnes Winter Soldier^{5} ^{MS}	Sebastian Stan					Sebastian Stan^{C}	Sebastian Stan			Sebastian Stan	
Clint Barton Hawkeye^{4} ^{MS}	Jeremy Renner									Jeremy Renner	
Peggy Carter^{MT} ^{OS}										Hayley Atwell	
Phil Coulson^{DS} ^{MT} ^{OS}									Clark Gregg		
Fandral					Zachary Levi						
Jane Foster^{4}										Natalie Portman	
Frigga										Rene Russo	
Nick Fury^{5} ^{MS} ^{MT}							Samuel L. Jackson^{C}		Samuel L. Jackson	Samuel L. Jackson	Samuel L. Jackson
Heimdall^{4}					Idris Elba		Idris Elba				
Maria Hill^{5} ^{MS} ^{MT}							Cobie Smulders^{C}			Cobie Smulders	Cobie Smulders
Harold "Happy" Hogan^{4}				Jon Favreau						Jon Favreau	Jon Favreau
Roger Harrington^{4}				Martin Starr							Martin Starr
Hogun					Tadanobu Asano						
Loki					Tom Hiddleston		Tom Hiddleston				
Odin					Anthony Hopkins						
Virginia "Pepper" Potts				Gwyneth Paltrow			Gwyneth Paltrow			Gwyneth Paltrow	
James "Rhodey" Rhodes War Machine^{MS}	Don Cheadle						Don Cheadle		Don Cheadle^{C}	Don Cheadle	
William Ginter Riva											Peter Billingsley
Steve Rogers Captain America^{6}	Chris Evans			Chris Evans			Chris Evans		Chris Evans^{C}	Chris Evans	
Natasha Romanoff Black Widow^{4}	Scarlett Johansson				Scarlett Johansson^{A}		Scarlett Johansson		Scarlett Johansson^{C}	Scarlett Johansson	
Thaddeus "Thunderbolt" Ross^{4} ^{5}	William Hurt						William Hurt			William Hurt	
Johann Schmidt Red Skull							Ross Marquand^{V}			Ross Marquand^{V}	
Jasper Sitwell^{MT} ^{OS}										Maximiliano Hernández	
Obadiah Stane											Jeff Bridges^{A}
Howard Stark^{MT} ^{OS}	John Slattery									John Slattery	
Tony Stark Iron Man	Robert Downey Jr.			Robert Downey Jr.			Robert Downey Jr.			Robert Downey Jr.	Robert Downey Jr.^{A}
Thanos							Josh Brolin			Josh Brolin	
Thor^{4} ^{6}		Chris Hemsworth^{C}			Chris Hemsworth		Chris Hemsworth			Chris Hemsworth	
Volstagg					Ray Stevenson						
=== Introduced in Phase Two ===
Cooper Barton^{MS}										Ben Sakamoto	
Laura Barton^{MS}										Linda Cardellini	
Lila Barton^{MS}										Ava Russo	
Sharon Carter^{MS}	Emily VanCamp										
Cosmo the Spacedog^{5} ^{SP}			Fred^{C}								
Dave								Tip "T.I." Harris			
Drax the Destroyer^{4} ^{5} ^{SP}			Dave Bautista				Dave Bautista			Dave Bautista	
F.R.I.D.A.Y.	Kerry Condon^{V}			Kerry Condon^{V}			Kerry Condon^{V}			Kerry Condon^{V}	
Gamora			Zoe Saldaña				Zoe Saldaña				
Groot^{4} ^{5} ^{SP}			Vin Diesel^{V}				Vin Diesel^{V} Terry Notary^{MC}			Vin Diesel^{V} Terry Notary^{MC}	
Howard the Duck^{5}			Seth Green^{V}								
Harley Keener										Ty Simpkins	
Ulysses Klaue						Andy Serkis					
Korath									Djimon Hounsou		
Kraglin Obfonteri^{4} ^{5} ^{SP}			Sean Gunn							Sean Gunn	
Kurt								David Dastmalchian			
Cassie Lang^{5}								Abby Ryder Fortson		Emma Fuhrmann	
Scott Lang Ant-Man^{5} ^{DS}	Paul Rudd							Paul Rudd		Paul Rudd	
Luis								Michael Peña			
Maggie								Judy Greer			
Wanda Maximoff^{4} ^{MS}	Elizabeth Olsen						Elizabeth Olsen			Elizabeth Olsen	
Nebula^{4} ^{5} ^{SP}			Karen Gillan				Karen Gillan			Karen Gillan	
Jim Paxton								Bobby Cannavale			
Alexander Pierce										Robert Redford	
Hank Pym^{5}								Michael Douglas		Michael Douglas	
Meredith Quill			Laura Haddock								
Jason Quill^{5}			Gregg Henry^{C}								
Peter Quill Star-Lord^{4} ^{5} ^{SP}			Chris Pratt				Chris Pratt			Chris Pratt	
Rocket^{4} ^{5} ^{SP}			Bradley Cooper^{V} Sean Gunn^{MC}				Bradley Cooper^{V} Sean Gunn^{MC}			Bradley Cooper^{V} Sean Gunn^{MC}	
Jack Rollins										Callan Mulvey	
Ronan the Accuser									Lee Pace		
Brock Rumlow	Frank Grillo									Frank Grillo	
Taneleer Tivan The Collector							Benicio del Toro				
Yondu Udonta^{5} ^{SP}			Michael Rooker								
Hope van Dyne Wasp^{5}								Evangeline Lilly		Evangeline Lilly	
Janet van Dyne^{5}								Michelle Pfeiffer		Michelle Pfeiffer	
Vision^{MS}	Paul Bettany						Paul Bettany				
Sam Wilson Falcon^{5} ^{6} ^{MS}	Anthony Mackie						Anthony Mackie			Anthony Mackie	
=== Introduced in Agent Carter ===
Edwin Jarvis										James D'Arcy	
=== Introduced in Captain America: Civil War ===
Ayo^{4} ^{MS}	Florence Kasumba					Florence Kasumba	Florence Kasumba				
Dean of MIT^{MS}	Jim Rash										
Vasily Karpov	Gene Farber										
May Parker^{4}	Marisa Tomei			Marisa Tomei						Marisa Tomei	Marisa Tomei
Peter Parker Spider-Man^{4} ^{6} ^{DS}	Tom Holland			Tom Holland			Tom Holland			Tom Holland	Tom Holland
Everett K. Ross^{4} ^{MS}	Martin Freeman					Martin Freeman					
Miriam Sharpe	Alfre Woodard										
Maria Stark	Hope Davis										
T'Chaka	John Kani					John Kani Atandwa Kani^{Y}					
T'Challa Black Panther	Chadwick Boseman					Chadwick Boseman	Chadwick Boseman			Chadwick Boseman	
Helmut Zemo^{MS}	Daniel Brühl										
=== Introduced in Doctor Strange ===
Ancient One		Tilda Swinton								Tilda Swinton	
Dormammu		Benedict Cumberbatch									
Daniel Drumm		Mark Anthony Brighton									
Hamir^{4}		Topo Wresniwiro									
Kaecilius		Mads Mikkelsen									
Lucian Aster		Scott Adkins									
Tina Minoru^{MT}		Linda Louise Duan									
Karl Mordo		Chiwetel Ejiofor									
Christine Palmer^{4}		Rachel McAdams									
Jonathan Pangborn		Benjamin Bratt									
Stephen Strange^{4}		Benedict Cumberbatch			Benedict Cumberbatch		Benedict Cumberbatch			Benedict Cumberbatch	
Nicodemus West^{4}		Michael Stuhlbarg									
Wong^{4} ^{6} ^{MS}		Benedict Wong					Benedict Wong			Benedict Wong	
=== Introduced in Guardians of the Galaxy Vol. 2 ===
Ayesha^{5}			Elizabeth Debicki								
Brahl			Stephen Blackehart								
Charlie-27			Ving Rhames								
Ego			Kurt Russell								
Gef the Ravager			Steve Agee								
Half-Nut			Jimmy Urine								
Mainframe^{5}			Miley Cyrus^{C} ^{V}								
Mantis^{4} ^{5} ^{SP}			Pom Klementieff				Pom Klementieff			Pom Klementieff	
Martinex^{5}			Michael Rosenbaum								
Narblik			Terence Rosemore								
Oblo			Joe Fria								
Aleta Ogord			Michelle Yeoh								
Stakar Ogord^{5}			Sylvester Stallone								
Retch			Evan Jones								
Scrote			Mike Escamilla^{C}								
Taserface			Chris Sullivan								
Tullk			Tommy Flanagan								
=== Introduced in Spider-Man: Homecoming ===
Abraham				Abraham Attah							
Betty Brant^{4} ^{DS}				Angourie Rice							Angourie Rice
Jackson Brice Shocker				Logan Marshall-Green							
Charles				Michael Barbieri							
Cindy				Tiffany Espensen			Tiffany Espensen				
Mr. Cobbwell				Tunde Adebimpe							
Aaron Davis				Donald Glover							
Mr. Delmar				Hemky Madera							
Foster^{4}				Gary Weeks							
Mac Gargan^{6}				Michael Mando							
Mr. Hapgood				John Penick							
Anne Marie Hoag				Tyne Daly							
Jason Ionello^{4}				Jorge Lendeborg Jr.							Jorge Lendeborg Jr.
Karen				Jennifer Connelly^{V}							
Ned Leeds^{4} ^{DS}				Jacob Batalon			Jacob Batalon			Jacob Batalon	Jacob Batalon
Liz				Laura Harrier							
Phineas Mason Tinkerer				Michael Chernus							
Michelle "MJ" Jones-Watson^{4}				Zendaya							Zendaya
Principal Morita				Kenneth Choi							
Sally				Isabella Amara			Isabella Amara				
Herman Schultz Shocker				Bokeem Woodbine							
Seymour				Josie Totah							
Eugene "Flash" Thompson^{4} ^{DS}				Tony Revolori							Tony Revolori
Tiny				Ethan Dizon			Ethan Dizon				
Adrian Toomes Vulture				Michael Keaton							
Doris Toomes				Garcelle Beauvais							
Ms. Warren				Selenis Leyva							
Coach Wilson^{4} ^{DS}				Hannibal Buress							
=== Introduced in Thor: Ragnarok ===
Grandmaster			(Note: Footage of Jeff Goldblum dancing on the set of Thor: Ragnarok as the Grandmaster appears briefly during the end credits of Guardians of the Galaxy Vol. 2. Marvel Studios President Kevin Feige explained that they had the footage while completing work on Vol. 2, and "thought it would be fun to put it in there", as he is the brother of the Collector, who is in Guardians of the Galaxy.)		Jeff Goldblum						
Hela					Cate Blanchett						
Korg^{4}					Taika Waititi					Taika Waititi	
Skurge					Karl Urban						
Surtur					Clancy Brown^{V} Taika Waititi^{MC}						
Topaz					Rachel House						
Valkyrie^{4}^{5}					Tessa Thompson					Tessa Thompson	
=== Introduced in Black Panther ===
Griot^{4}						Trevor Noah^{V}					
Linda						Nabiyah Be					
M'Baku^{4}						Winston Duke	Winston Duke			Winston Duke	
N'Jadaka / Erik "Killmonger" Stevens^{4}						Michael B. Jordan					
N'Jobu						Sterling K. Brown					
Nakia^{4}						Lupita Nyong'o					
Nomble^{MS}						Janeshia Adams-Ginyard	Janeshia Adams-Ginyard				
Okoye^{4} ^{MS}						Danai Gurira	Danai Gurira			Danai Gurira	
Ramonda^{4}						Angela Bassett				Angela Bassett	
Shuri^{4}						Letitia Wright	Letitia Wright			Letitia Wright	
W'Kabi						Daniel Kaluuya					
Xoliswa						Sydelle Noel					
Yama^{MS}						Zola Williams	Zola Williams				
Zuri						Forest Whitaker Denzel Whitaker^{Y}					
=== Introduced in Avengers: Infinity War ===
Eitri							Peter Dinklage				
Corvus Glaive							Michael James Shaw			Michael James Shaw	
Ebony Maw							Tom Vaughan-Lawlor			Tom Vaughan-Lawlor	
Proxima Midnight							Carrie Coon Monique Ganderton^{MC}			Monique Ganderton^{MC}	
Cull Obsidian							Terry Notary			Terry Notary	
=== Introduced in Ant-Man and the Wasp ===
Sonny Burch								Walton Goggins			
Bill Foster^{5}								Laurence Fishburne			
Ava Starr Ghost^{5}								Hannah John-Kamen			
Elihas Starr								Michael Cerveris			
Uzman								Divian Ladwa			
Jimmy Woo^{5} ^{MS}								Randall Park			
=== Introduced in Captain Marvel ===
Att-Lass									Algenis Perez Soto		
Bron-Char									Rune Temte		
Carol Danvers Captain Marvel^{5} ^{MS}									Brie Larson	Brie Larson	
G'iah^{MS}									Auden L. Ophuls; Harriet L. Ophuls		
Mar-Vell / Wendy Lawson									Annette Bening		
Minn-Erva									Gemma Chan		
Maria Rambeau^{5}									Lashana Lynch		
Monica Rambeau^{5} ^{MS}									Akira Akbar		
Soren^{MS}									Sharon Blynn		Sharon Blynn^{C}
Supreme Intelligence									Annette Bening		
Talos^{MS}									Ben Mendelsohn		Ben Mendelsohn^{C}
Yon-Rogg									Jude Law		
=== Introduced in Avengers: Endgame ===
Akihiko										Hiroyuki Sanada	
Nathaniel Barton^{MS}										Cade Woodward	
Gamora (Note: This is an alternate version of the character who first appeared in Avengers: Endgame (2019).)^{5}										Zoe Saldaña	
Loki (Note: This is an alternate, time variant version of the character from a branched reality created in Avengers: Endgame (2019).)^{5} ^{MS}										Tom Hiddleston	
Morgan Stark										Alexandra Rachael Rabe	
=== Introduced in Spider-Man: Far From Home ===
Quentin Beck Mysterio											Jake Gyllenhaal
Brad Davis											Remy Hii
Julius Dell^{4}											J. B. Smoove
Dimitri											Numan Acar
E.D.I.T.H.											Dawn Michelle King^{V}
J. Jonah Jameson^{4} ^{DS}											J. K. Simmons

== See also ==
- Marvel Cinematic Universe film actors
- Marvel One-Shot actors
- Marvel Studios television series actors
- WHIH Newsfront actors
- The Daily Bugle actors
- Marvel Television series actors
- Agents of S.H.I.E.L.D.: Slingshot actors
- Stan Lee cameos
