= Melia (given name) =

Melia is a feminine given name of Greek origin and comes from μελία, the ancient Greek word for ash-tree. In Greek mythology, Melia was an Oceanid, daughter of the Titans Oceanus and Tethys.

== People ==
- Melia Kreiling, actress
- Melia Watras, American violist
- Melia Sakakini (1890–1966), Palestinian feminist and headmistress

== Fictional characters ==
- Melia (Stargate), member of the Atlantean High Council in the Stargate fictional universe
- Melia Antiqua, in Xenoblade Chronicles
- Melia, daughter of Oebalus in the Mozart opera Apollo et Hyacinthus

== See also ==
- Melia (mythology)
