= Don Pepe =

Don Pepe may refer to:

People

- José Figueres Ferrer (1906–1990), Costa Rican politician; President three times
- José Amalfitani (1894–1969), Argentine construction manager, sports journalist and association football executive
- José Batlle y Ordóñez (1856–1929), Uruguayan politician, served as president for two terms.
- José de la Rosa, 19th-century Mexican composer, printer, singer and guitarist living in California

Other

- Gran Meliá Don Pepe, hotel in Marbella, Spain
- Don Pepe, 20th century Cuban magazine by Néstor Carbonell y Rivero; see Cuban authors and writers
- Don Pepe, a brand of cigar; see List of cigar brands

== See also ==
- Don (disambiguation)
- Pepe (disambiguation)
