= Tenerus (son of Apollo) =

Son of Apollo in Greek mythology

In ancient Greek religion and mythology, the Theban hero Tenerus (Ancient Greek: Τήνερος, romanized: Tēneros) was the son and prophet of Apollo. His mother was Melia, a daughter of the Titan Oceanus.

== Mythology ==
According to Pausanias, Melia, who had been abducted by Apollo, gave birth to Tenerus and his brother Ismenus, the eponym of the Theban river. The Teneric plain, Northwest of Thebes was named after Tenerus.

Tenerus was a priest and prophet of Apollo, and had an oracle at the Ismenion, the Temple of Apollo at Thebes. The late 6th–early 5th century BC Theban poet Pindar, called Tenerus "the temple tending seer", and referred to him as "mighty Tenerus, chosen prophet of oracles", to whom Apollo entrusted the city of Thebes, "because of his wise courage", and whom Poseidon honored "above all mortals". A very fragmentary Pindaric Paean, was perhaps addressed to Tenerus. Its first line has the singer sing: "(I come to?) the giver of divine oracles" and in line thirteen "we speak of the hero Tenerus", with mentions in the immediately succeeding lines of "bulls", "before the altar", "they sang a song", and "oracle". Lycophron, refers to Thebes, or perhaps more generally Boeotia, as the "land and temples of Teneros". Pausanias says that Tenerus was given "the art of divination", by his father Apollo. Tenerus was also perhaps connected with the Ptoion, the oracular sanctuary of Apollo Ptoieus at the foot of Mount Ptoion.
