= Caanthus =

Figure from Greek mythology

Caanthus is also a synonym of the cylindrical bark beetle genus Ciconissus.

In Greek mythology, Caanthus or Kaanthos (/keɪˈænθəs/; Ancient Greek: Κάανθος) was the son of Oceanus and Tethys, and the brother of Melia, who was the consort of Apollo, and an important cult figure at Thebes.

== Mythology ==
According to the second-century geographer Pausanias, Caanthus was commanded by his father Oceanus to seek his sister Melia, who had been abducted by Apollo, but being unable to get Melia away from Apollo, Caanthus set fire to the Apollo's sanctuary, and Apollo shot and killed him.

The story of Caanthus is a close parallel to the more famous story of Cadmus, the founder and first king of Thebes. Like Caanthus, Cadmus' sister Europa is abducted by an Olympian god (in this case Zeus), and Cadmus is sent by his father to bring Europa back home, and like Caanthus, Cadmus is unsuccessful. Caanthus' story is perhaps also related to the story of the Theban Amphion. According to Hyginus, Amphion, like Caanthus, was shot and killed by Apollo because of an attack on his temple.

According to Pausanias, Caanthus was buried near a spring above the Ismenion, the Temple of Apollo at Thebes. Pausanias identified the spring as the famous spring of Ares, where Cadmus killed the dragon guarding it.

== Analysis ==
According to Jacob Bryant Caanthus, Cunthus and Cunæthus are all titles of a Deity called Chan-Thoth in Egypt.
