= Meliae =

Group of tree nymphs in Greek mythology

In Greek mythology, the Meliae, also called Meliads (/ˈmiːli.iː/; Ancient Greek: Μελίαι, romanized: Melíai or Μελιάδες, Meliádes), were usually considered to be the nymphs of the ash tree, whose name they shared.

== Mythology ==
According to Hesiod, the Meliae (probably meaning all tree-nymphs) were born from the drops of blood that fell on Gaia [Earth] when Cronus castrated Uranus. In Hesiod's Works and Days, the ash trees, perhaps meaning the Melian nymphs, are said to have been the progenitors of the generation of men belonging to Hesiod's Bronze Age.

The Meliae were nurses of the infant Zeus in the Cretan Dikti mountains, according to the 3rd century BC poet Callimachus, Hymn to Zeus, where they fed him on the milk of the goat Amalthea and honey.

Callimachus appears to make the Theban nymph Melia, who was, by Apollo, the mother of Tenerus and Ismenus, one of the "earth-born" Meliae. Elsewhere, however, this Melia is an Oceanid, one of the many daughters of Oceanus and Tethys. The mythographer Apollodorus wrote that centaur Pholus's parents were Silenus and one of the Meliae, thus differentiating him genealogically from the other centaurs.

== See also ==
- Plant soul
- Trees in mythology
