= Mammals (TV series) =

British black comedy web series

- Genre: Black comedy; Drama
- Created by: Jez Butterworth; James Richardson
- Written by: Jez Butterworth; James Richardson
- Directed by: Stephanie Laing
- Starring: James Corden; Melia Kreiling; Colin Morgan; Sally Hawkins
- Music by: Graham Coxon
- Country of origin: United Kingdom
- Original language: English
- No. of seasons: 1
- No. of episodes: 6

Production
- Producers: Jez Butterworth; Dee Collier; Georgina Lowe
- Cinematography: Mattias Nyberg
- Editor: Brenna Rangott
- Production companies: Amazon Studios; Street Hassle; Vertigo Films; Fulwell 73

Original release
- Network: Prime Video
- Release: 11 November 2022

Mammals is a 2022 British black comedy television series, which premiered on Prime Video on 11 November 2022. It is written by Jez Butterworth and directed by Stephanie Laing. It stars James Corden, Melia Kreiling, Colin Morgan, and Sally Hawkins in pivotal roles. Produced by Street Hassle in association with Vertigo Films and Fulwell 73, the series explores the complexities of modern marriage.

== Plot ==
Official trailer

Jamie is a successful Michelin-starred chef whose world implodes when he discovers some shocking secrets about his pregnant wife, Amandine. Jamie hunts for answers with the help of his brother-in-law Jeff. Through this hunt, the cracks in Jeff's marriage to Jamie's sister Lue also widen. Jeff tries to get through to Lue, but this only makes Lue descend deeper into a secret fantasy world.

== Cast ==
- James Corden as Jamie
- Melia Kreiling as Amandine
- Colin Morgan as Jeff
- Sally Hawkins as Lue
- Henry Lloyd-Hughes as Jack
- Samuel Anderson as Dan
- Tom Jones as himself

== Episodes ==
| No. | Title | Directed by | Written by | Original release date |
|---|---|---|---|---|
| 1 | "Episode 1" | Stephanie Laing | Jez Butterworth | 11 November 2022 |
| 2 | "Episode 2" | Stephanie Laing | Jez Butterworth | 11 November 2022 |
| 3 | "Episode 3" | Stephanie Laing | Jez Butterworth | 11 November 2022 |
| 4 | "Episode 4" | Stephanie Laing | Jez Butterworth | 11 November 2022 |
| 5 | "Episode 5" | Stephanie Laing | Jez Butterworth | 11 November 2022 |
| 6 | "Episode 6" | Stephanie Laing | Jez Butterworth | 11 November 2022 |

== Release ==
The teaser for Mammals was released on 17 October 2022. The series premiered on Prime Video on 11 November 2022.

== Reception ==
On the review aggregator website Rotten Tomatoes, 67% of 30 critics' reviews are positive, with an average rating of 6.5/10. The website's consensus reads: "Providing James Corden with a surlier role that he inhabits convincingly, Mammals is an intriguing enough study of monogamy that unfortunately proves too trying a commitment before getting to the point." Metacritic, which uses a weighted average, assigned a score of 60 out of 100 based on 14 critics, indicating "mixed or average reviews".
