= Melia's Grocers and Tea Dealers =

British grocery store chain

Melia's Grocers and Tea Dealers was a significant British retailer.

== Daniel Melia ==
Melia's grocery and provisions store was founded by Daniel Melia of Manchester originally under the name Daniel Melia & Co. Ltd. In 1896, it was formed into a limited company with a capital of £60,000 and 60 shops across the country. The company was wound up voluntarily in 1905.

At Leamington on Monday 29 March 1896 Daniel Melia (trading as Melia and Co), "with branches in various parts of the country", was charged under the Merchandise Marks Act with having unlawfully applied a certain false trade description "English roll" to American roll bacon. The defence was substantially that the employer was not criminally responsible for the acts of his servant. The bench imposed the maximum penalty of £50, and allowed the costs of the prosecution. Defendant gave notice of appeal.

== Melia's Grocers ==
Melia's Ltd became popular as a grocers and tea dealers from the 1920s to the 1960s alongside Maypole and Home and Colonial Stores. These grocery stores were purchased by Associated British Foods, who also owned Fine Fare.

There were branches in Southport, Melton Mowbray, Chester, Leyland, Banbury, Evesham, Northampton and many more towns and cities across the UK. The store sold general groceries but often specialised in tea. The company also packaged its own butter and sugar.
