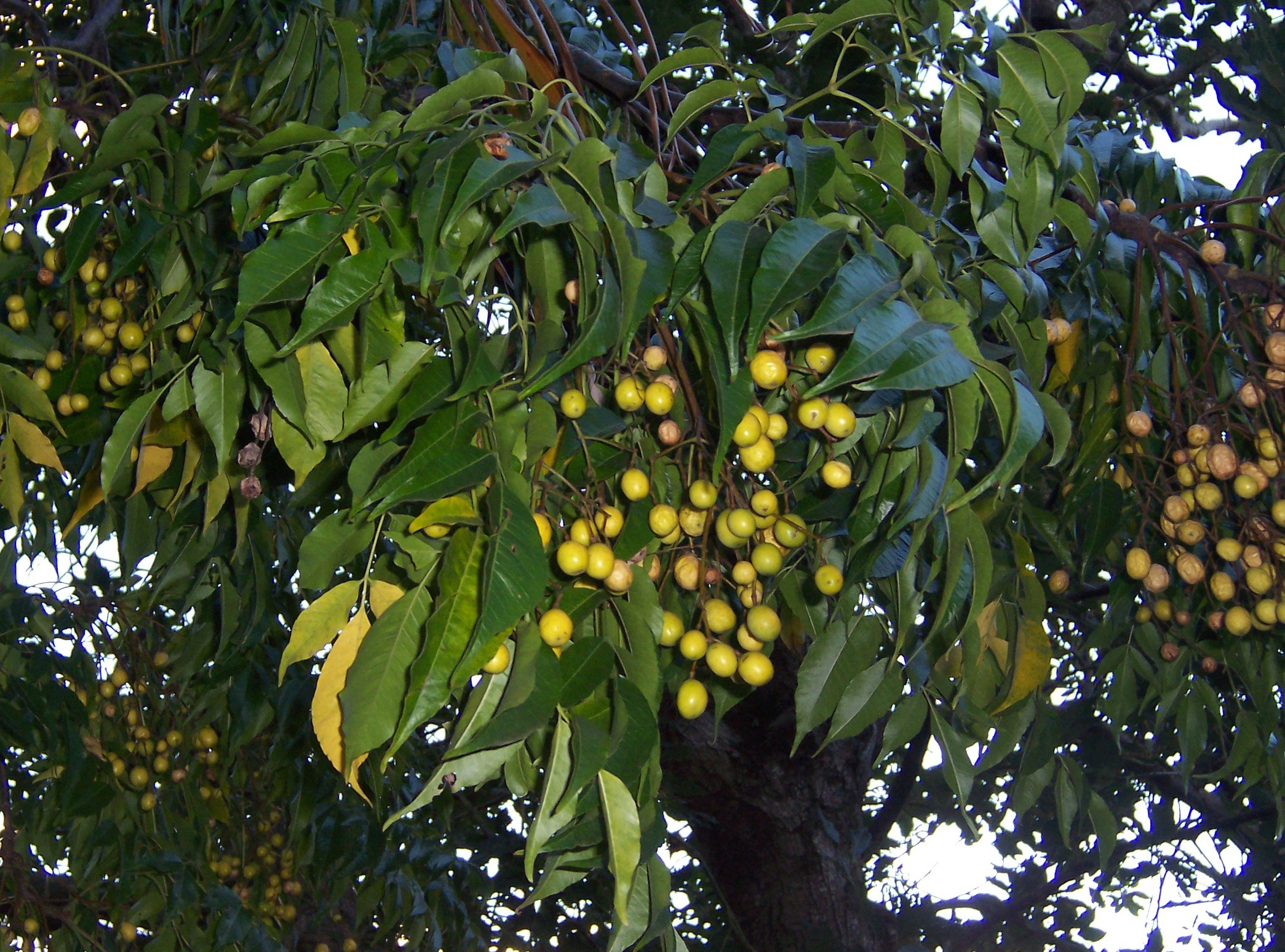
- Melia azedarach

Scientific classification
- Kingdom: Plantae
- Clade: Tracheophytes
- Clade: Angiosperms
- Clade: Eudicots
- Clade: Rosids
- Order: Sapindales
- Family: Meliaceae
- Subfamily: Melioideae
- Genus: Melia; L.

Type species
- Melia azedarach L.

Species
- See text.

Synonyms
- Antelaea Gaertn.; Azedara Raf.; Azedarac Adans.; Azedarach Mill.; Zederachia Heist. ex Fabr.

= Melia (plant) =

Genus of trees

Melia is a genus of flowering trees in the family Meliaceae. The name is derived from μελία, the Greek name used by Theophrastus (c. 371 – c. 287 BC) for Fraxinus ornus, which has similar leaves.

== Species ==
As of March 2023, Plants of the World Online accepted three species:

- Melia azedarach L. – chinaberry, Persian lilac, white cedar
- Melia dubia Cav.
- Melia volkensii Gürke

=== Formerly placed here ===
- Azadirachta excelsa (Jack) M.Jacobs (as M. excelsa Jack)
- Azadirachta indica A.Juss. (as M. azadirachta L.)
- Cipadessa baccifera (Roth) Miq. (as M. baccifera Roth)
- Dysoxylum parasiticum (Osbeck) Kosterm. (as M. parasitica Osbeck)
- Sandoricum koetjape (Burm.f.) Merr. (as M. koetjape Burm.f.)
