= Mellia =

Mellia may refer to:

- Mi'ilya, old name for
- Mimicia
