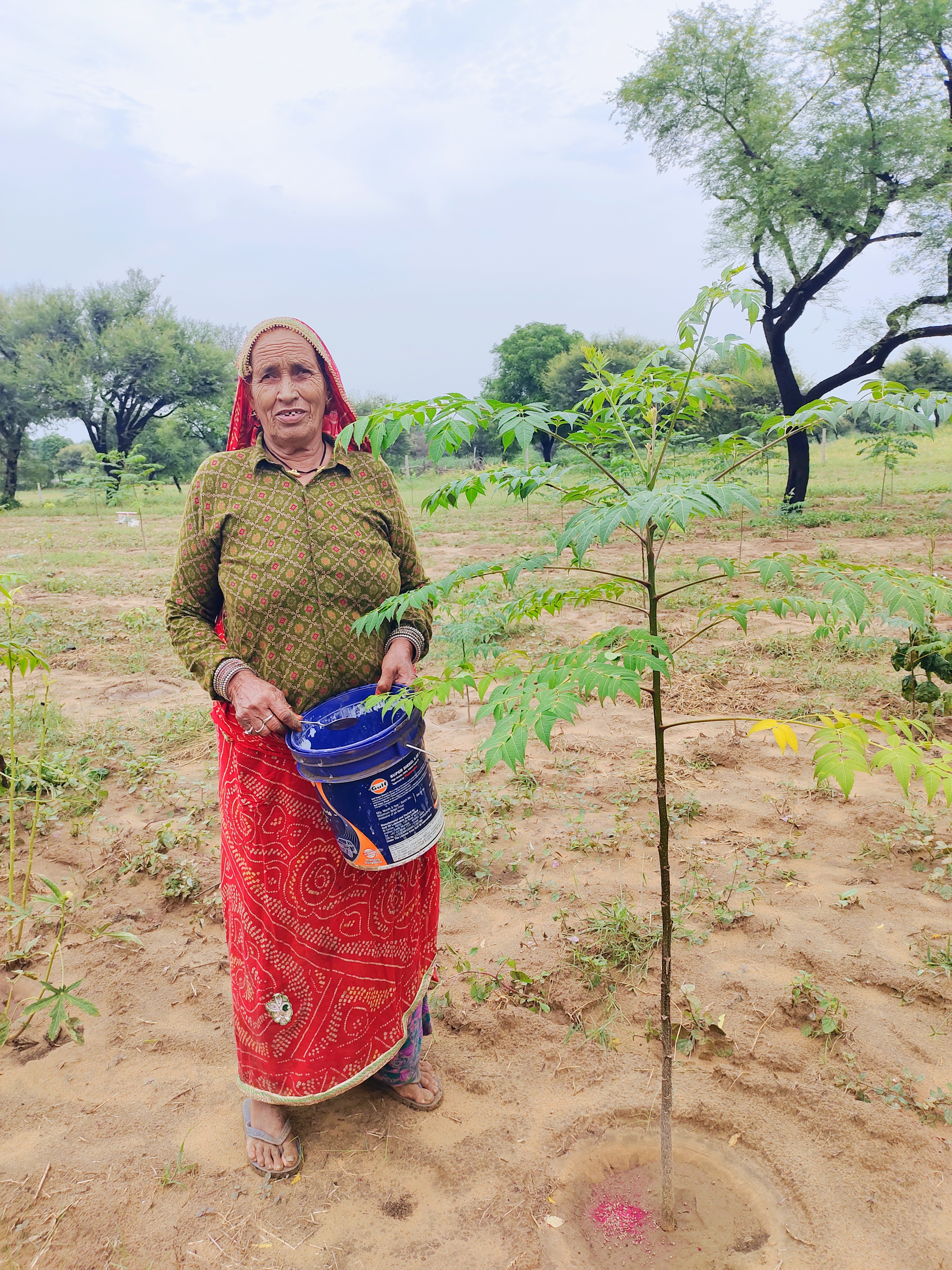
- Rajasthani women putting fertiliser to a Melia dubia plant

Scientific classification
- Kingdom: Plantae
- Clade: Tracheophytes
- Clade: Angiosperms
- Clade: Eudicots
- Clade: Rosids
- Order: Sapindales
- Family: Meliaceae
- Genus: Melia
- Species: M. dubia

Binomial name
- Melia dubia Cav.

Synonyms
- Melia composita Willd.

= Melia dubia =

Species of tree

Melia dubia, commonly known as Malabar Neem, Maha Neem, Gora Neem, or Barma Dhek, is one of the most important industrial tree species that has rapidly expanded in the Indian subcontinent in recent decades. It belongs to the family Meliaceae and is widely cultivated for its industrial and medicinal qualities.

== Taxonomy ==
Melia dubia belongs to the family Meliaceae, within the genus Melia.

== Distribution ==
Melia dubia is considered one of the most important industrial tree species in India because of its rapid growth and versatile applications. Its wood is extensively used in the plywood industry, in the manufacture of furniture, for pulp and paper production, and increasingly as a source of bioenergy.

== Description ==
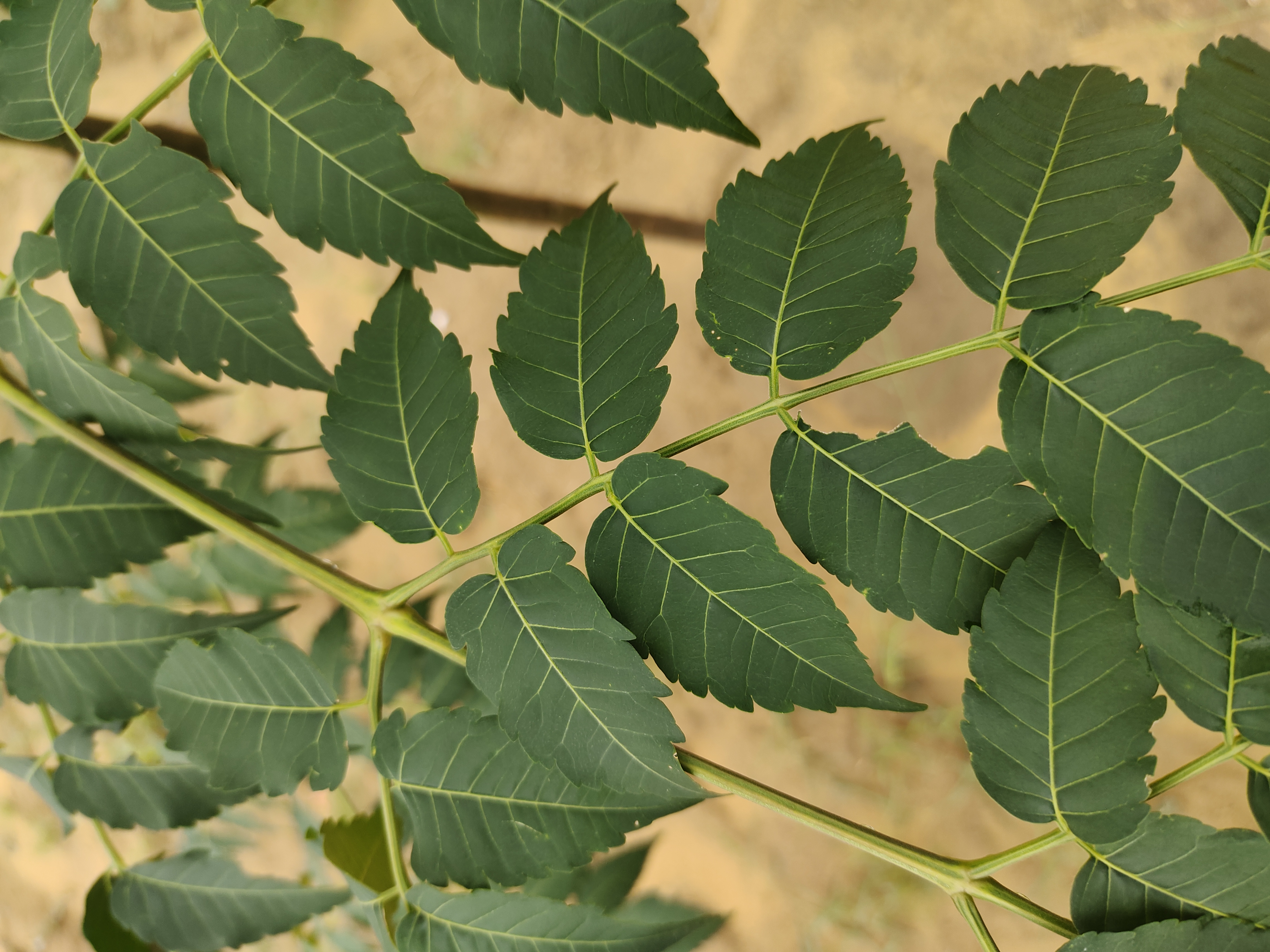
Leaves of Melia dubia

Melia dubia is a fast-growing tree that can attain a height of 6 to 30 metres. It has a spreading crown and a straight bole that may reach up to 10 metres in length. The species is supported by a tap root system. The tree is highly adaptable and drought tolerant, capable of growing in a variety of soil types ranging from deep fertile sandy loam to shallow gravelly soils.

== Uses ==
=== Industrial ===
Melia dubia is considered one of the most important industrial tree species in India because of its rapid growth and versatile applications. Its wood is extensively used in the plywood industry, in the manufacture of furniture, for pulp and paper production, and increasingly as a source of bioenergy.

=== Medicinal ===
Apart from its industrial value, Melia dubia has been traditionally recognised for its medicinal properties. It is said to possess anti-cancer, anti-diabetic, anti-tumour, anti-inflammatory, antioxidant, antibacterial, antiviral, and fungicidal activities. These properties have made it significant in the treatment of various ailments in traditional medicine.

== Sources ==
Melia dubia flower

Melia dubia leaflet

=== Citations ===
- Sumit; Arya, Sandeep; Nanda, Krishma; Jangra, Monika; Shivam (2024-03-12). "Enhancing Soil Health and Sustainability: The Impact of Melia Dubia-based Agroforestry in a Semi-Arid Region of Haryana, India". International Journal of Plant & Soil Science. 36 (4): 369–377.
- Goswami, Manika; Bhagta, Shikha; Sharma, Dushyant (2020-02-18). "Melia dubia and its Importance: A Review". International Journal of Economic Plants. 7 (Feb, 1): 029–033.
- Karuppannan, Sathish Kumar; Bushion, Jayandra; Ramalingam, Raghavendra; Swaminathan, Subhashini; Arunachalam, Kantha Deivi; Kadam, Avinash Ashok; Rajagopal, Rajakrishnan; Sathya, Rengasamy; Chinnappan, Sasikala (--). "Fabrication, characterization and in vitro evaluation of Melia dubia extract infused nanofibers for wound dressing". Journal of King Saud University – Science. 34
- Samji, A., Eashwarlal, K., Warrier, K. C. S., Kumar, S., Ramasamy, T., Shanthi, K., & Warrier, R. R. (2025). Divergence and genetic parameters between Melia dubia genotypes based on morpho-anatomical stomatal descriptors. Plant Biosystems - An International Journal Dealing with All Aspects of Plant Biology, 159(2), 332–340.
