= Melia (surname) =

Melia is a family name that may originate in the Caucasus state of Georgia, in Italy, or in Ireland. The Georgian name is believed to be derived from the word melia (sometimes mela), meaning "fox". Names derived from Melia are Meliava, Meliva, Melua, Meluava or Meladze. The Italian history may date back to early Rome. The Irish origins may be via alterations to the name O'Maille or O'Malley.

Notable people with the surname Melia or Meliá include:

- Aoife Melia, Irish medical doctor
- Careena Melia, Irish-American actress
- Cian Melia, Irish showjumper
- Elie Melia (1915–1988), lived in Belgium and then in France; priest and historian of the Georgian Orthodox Church
- Fulvio Melia (born 1956), Italian-American astrophysicist, cosmologist and author
- Jimmy Melia (born 1937), English footballer
- Joe Melia (1935–2012), British television and film actor
- Leslie Melia (1929–1997), Canadian sprint canoer at the 1956 Olympics
- Mason Melia (born 2007), Irish footballer
- Michael Melia (born 1945), British actor
- Nika Melia (born 1979), Georgian politician
- Pius Melia (1800–1883), Italian Jesuit theologian
- Salome Melia (born 1987), Georgian chess player
- Salvador Meliá (born 1977), Spanish track cyclist at the 2000 and 2004 Olympics
- Thomas O. Melia (born 1957), American advocate for human rights and democracy
- Cormac Melia (born 2007), Irish actor
- Tim Melia (born 1986), American soccer player

== See also ==
- Melua, a surname
