= Bereet =

Publication information
- Publisher: Curtis Magazines; Marvel Comics
- First appearance: The Rampaging Hulk #1 (Jan. 1977)
- Created by: Doug Moench (writer); Walt Simonson (artist)

In-story information
- Species: Krylorian

Bereet is a character appearing in American comic books published by Marvel Comics.

Melia Kreiling portrayed the character in the Marvel Cinematic Universe film Guardians of the Galaxy (2014).

== Publication history ==
Bereet first appeared in The Rampaging Hulk #1 (Jan. 1977), and was created by Doug Moench and Walt Simonson. She also appeared in The Rampaging Hulk #9 (June 1978).

This version was subsequently revealed to be an alternate universe version. The mainstream Earth-616 version of Bereet first appeared in The Incredible Hulk vol. 2 #269 (March 1982), and continued to appear in the series in The Incredible Hulk vol. 2 #270-282 (April 1982-April 1983), #285 (July 1983), and #287 (Sept. 1983).

Bereet received an entry in The Official Handbook of the Marvel Universe: Hulk (2004).

== Fictional character biography ==
Bereet is a Krylorian techno-artist who used her alien technology to produce films concerning fictional adventures of herself and the Hulk. Most of the population is obsessed with the escapist movie-like fantasies of techno-art films, leading to her popularity among her people. Bereet later traveled to Earth and became involved with the Hulk at a time when had Bruce Banner's intelligence, befriending him and Rick Jones.

The planet Krylor and its population was destroyed by Ego the Living Planet during the "Maximum Security" storyline.

== Powers and abilities ==
Bereet possesses a semi-avian physiology with hollow bones, with physical abilities identical to a human's. She uses a number of techno-art creations including her Spatial Distorter, Banshee Mask, Defendroids, Energy-Eaters, "Flitter," Insula-Sphere, Life Support Spider, "Spindrone," Star Eyes, and Web-Spider.

== In other media ==
Bereet appears in Guardians of the Galaxy, portrayed by Melia Kreiling.
