= Ptoion =

Mountain range in Boeotia, Greece

Coordinates: 38°28′52″N 23°19′40″E

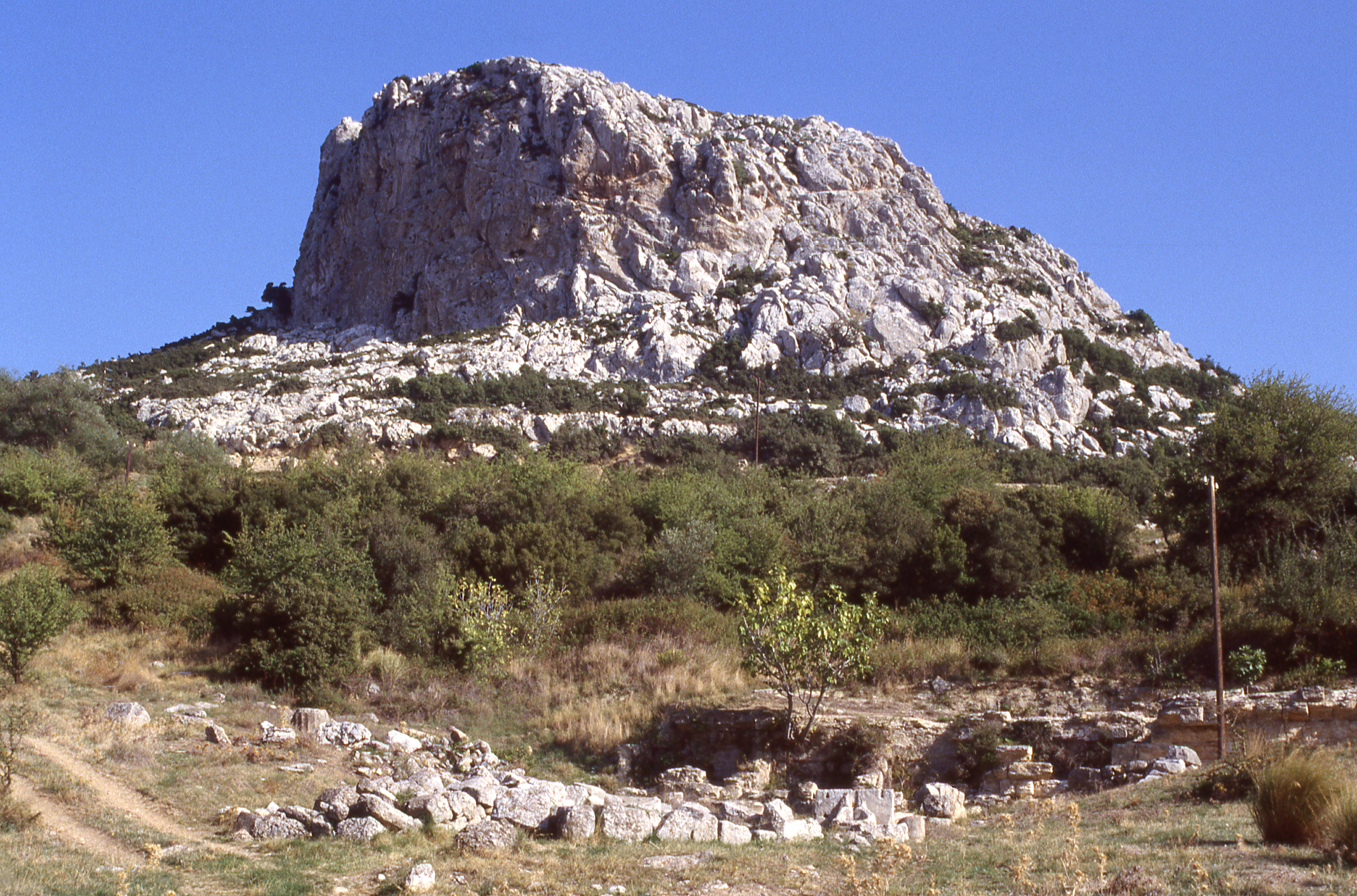
The site of the sanctuary of Apollo Ptoios at the western end of mount Ptoion

Ptoion (Ancient Greek Ptōïon Πτώϊον, also Ptōon Πτῷον / Πτῶον, Modern Greek Ptoo Πτώο or Oros Pelagias Όρος Πελαγίας) is a mountain chain in northeastern Boiotia. It stretches from Akraiphia by the former Lake Copais in the west to the Gulf of Euboea in the east, reaching up to 725 m (Agia Pelagia) in the west and 781 m (Petalás) in the east. The massif is particularly famed for the oracle of Apollo, which was located in the sanctuary of Apollo Ptoios at the western end of the range and was among the most important Greek oracles up to the time of the Persian Wars.

== History of the Oracle of Apollo ==
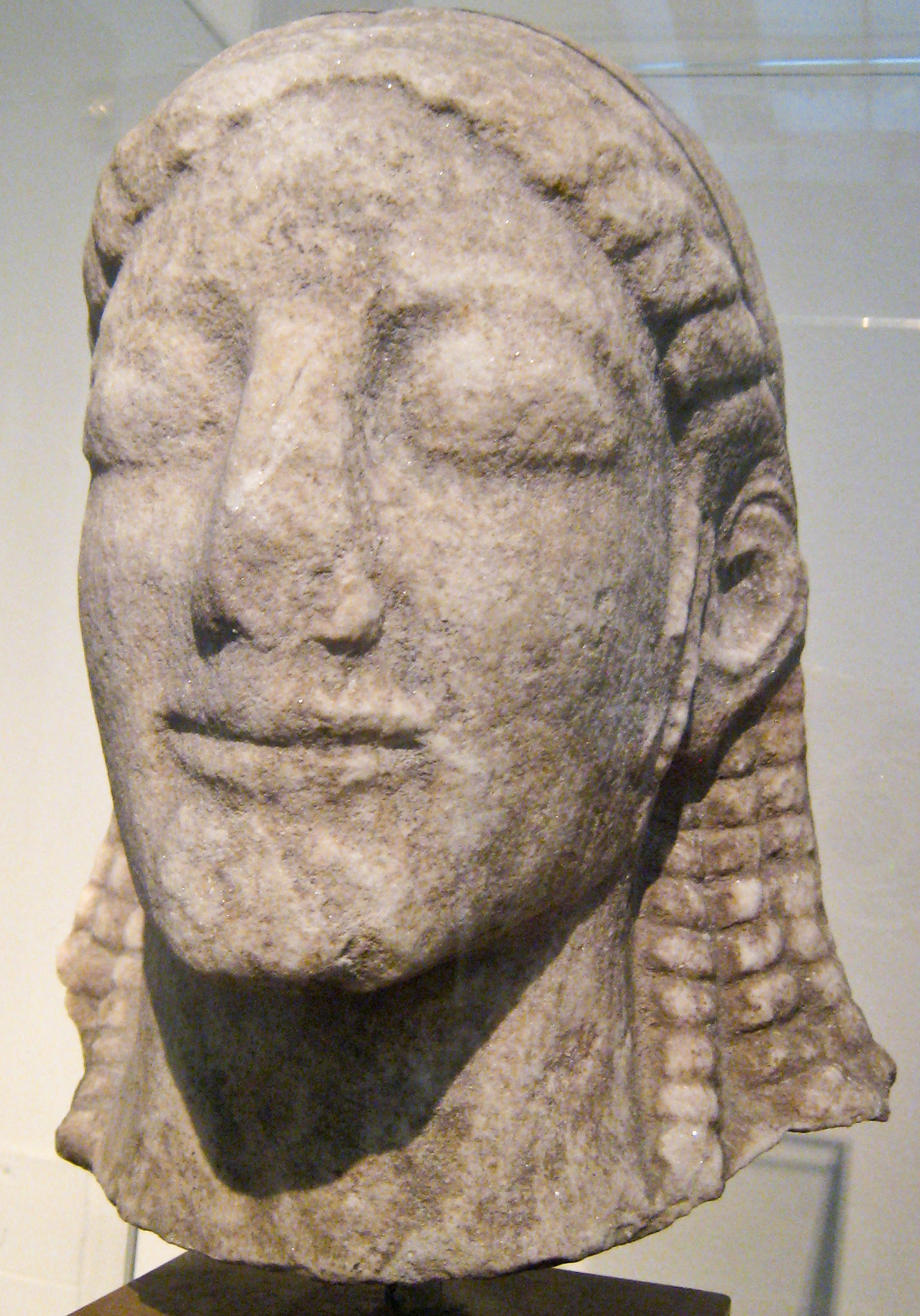
Head of a Kouros from the Temple of Apollo, National Archaeological Museum, Athens

The oracle of Apollo Ptoios was located three kilometres northeast of Akraiphia. Pausanias reports that it was originally an oracle of Ptoios, a local hero who was son of Athamas and Themisto, but that he was displaced by Apollo. The name Ptoios was also that of the mountain which loomed over the oracle and was borne by Apollo as a local epithet. The hero had his own small sanctuary on the Kastraki, about a kilometre west of the original location which shows archaeological signs of activity from the seventh century BC until the 4th.

On Mount Ptoios itself there are remains of a Neolithic-Helladic settlement and a Mycenaean fortress, but it had been abandoned by Archaic times. The oracle is mentioned by Herodotus who describes a visit by Mys of Europos who had been sent by the Persian general Mardonius to obtain prophecies from many oracles:

"But miracle reported by the Thebans is the greatest in my opinion. They say that, when Mys of Europos was going around all the oracles, he went to the sanctuary of Ptoios Apollo. This temple is called the Ptoion; it belongs to the Thebans and lies above Lake Copais by the mountain closest to the city of Akraiphia. When this man called Mys came to this temple, three townsmen chosen by the community came along to record what was foretold and at once the seer spoke in a Barbarian language. The Thebans were amazed at hearing a Barbarian language rather than Greek but did not know what this meant for the matter at hand. Mys of Europa, however, took the tablet they were carrying from them and wrote down the words of the prophet, declaring that he was speaking in Carian. He took what he had written with him and went away to Thessaly, where Mardonius was able to read it."

This incident is also recorded by Pausanias. The area was controlled by Thebes until the end of the Classical period, as demonstrated by the remains of Theban defensive works on various peaks in the mountain range (though not on Mount Ptoios itself). After that the sanctuary was at first under the control of the Boeotian League and later of Akraiphia. By the time Pausanias visited the site in the second century AD, the "infallible" oracle was no longer active.

According to a decree of the Delphic Amphictyonic League, a musical competition in honour of Apollo called the Ptoia was held near the oracle every five years from 227 BC. The festival later lapsed, but was revived under the Julio-Claudian Emperors as the Ptoia and Caesarea (Πτώϊα καὶ Καισάρεια) and continued to be celebrated until the beginning of the third century AD.

In Byzantine times the sanctuary was replaced by a Christian monastery, called Agia Pelagia which relocated to the summit of Mount Ptoios during the Ottoman period.

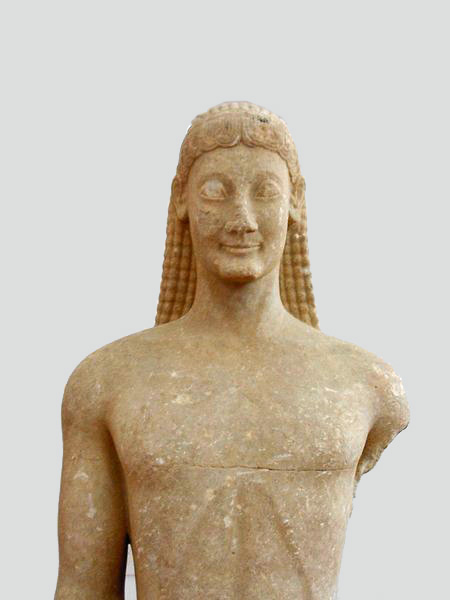
Kouros from Ptoion (Thebes, Archaeological Museum)

== Bibliography ==
- Siegfried Lauffer, "Ptoion", in Realencyclopädie der classischen Altertumswissenschaft XXIII,2, cols. 1506–1578
- Albert Schachter, The Cults of Boiotia. Vol. 1, London 1981, pp. 52–73; Vol. 3, London 1994, pp. 11–21
