= Melia (consort of Apollo) =

Ancient Greek deity

In ancient Greek religion and mythology, Melia or Melie (Ancient Greek: Μελία or Μελίη, romanized: Meliê, lit. 'ash-tree') was a daughter of the Titan Oceanus, the consort of Apollo, and the mother, by the latter, of the Theban hero and prophet Tenerus. She was also the mother (or sister) of Ismenus, god of the Theban river of the same name. Melia was an important cult figure at Thebes. She was worshipped at the Ismenion, the Temple of Apollo at Thebes, and was associated with a nearby spring.

== Mythology ==
The late 6th–early 5th century BC Theban poet Pindar tells us that Melia, a daughter of Oceanus, was, by Apollo, the mother of the Theban hero and prophet Tenerus. Elsewhere he refers to her as "Melia of the golden spindle". The 2nd century AD Greek geographer Pausanias provides a more complete account. According to Pausanias, Melia was abducted, and Melia's father Oceanus ordered his son Caanthus to find her. Caanthus found Melia at Thebes being held by Apollo, but unable to get Melia away from Apollo, Caanthus set fire to Apollo's sanctuary, and Apollo shot and killed him. Pausanias says that, in addition to Tenerus, to whom Apollo gave the "art of divination", Melia had another son by Apollo, Ismenus, after whom the Theban river Ismenus was named.

The story of Melia and Caanthus, as recorded by Pausanias, is a close parallel to the more famous story of Europa and Cadmus, the founder and first king of Thebes. Like Melia, Europa is abducted by an Olympian god (in this case Zeus), and her brother Cadmus is sent by their father to bring Europa back home, and like Caanthus, Cadmus is unsuccessful. As noted by Fontenrose, there are other apparent congruences between the Theban Melia and Europa. Like Melia, Europa was also the name of an Oceanid, and Agenor, the usual father of Europa, had, according to the fifth-century BC mythographer Pherecydes, a daughter named Melia who was a wife of Danaus, while, according to the mythographer Apollodrus, one of Danaos' wife's was also named Europa.

There were apparently other versions of this Theban Melia's story. In some traditions perhaps, the Thebans Melia and Ismenus were siblings, rather than mother and son. A scholiast on Pindar says that Ismenus was Melia's brother. According to the Oxyrhynchus Papyri, the first fratricide occurred at Thebes when Melia's brothers, Ismenus and Claaitus (a corruption or variant of Caanthus?) fought over her.

A version of Melia's story perhaps also involved the Theban Amphion. Pherecydes says that Melia was the name of one of the daughters of Amphion and his wife Niobe, while later sources tell us that Ismenus was the name of one of their sons. Like Caanthus, Amphion was shot and killed by Apollo because of an attack on his temple.

The 3rd century BC poet Callimachus appears to make this Theban Melia, rather than a daughter of Oceanus, one of the "earth-born" Meliae, the ash tree nymphs, who, according to Hesiod, were born, along with the Erinyes and the Giants, from Gaia (Earth) and the blood of Uranus (Sky), which dripped on Gaia when Uranus was castrated by his son Cronus.

According to the mythographer Apollodorus, the mother of Phoroneus, and Aegialeus, by her brother, the river god Inachus, was also a daughter of Oceanus named Melia.

=== Cult ===
Melia was an important object of cult worship at the Ismenion, the major sanctuary of Apollo Ismenios at Thebes. In at least three separate poems, Pindar mentions Melia in connection with the Theban sanctuary. In one he refers to the Ismenion and "the splendid hall of Oceanus’ daughter . . . Melia". In another, Pindar summons the local heroines, the daughters of Cadmus, Semele and Ino Leucothea, along with the mother of Heracles, to "join Melia at the treasury of the golden tripods," that is in the adyton, the inner inviolate sanctuary of the Ismenion where the votive tripods were dedicated. Also at the Ismenion, Pindar locates the "immortal couch [λέχει] of Melia", the child-bed, where Melia gave birth. A spring near the Ismenion was identified with Melia, perhaps the source of the Ismenus river, and perhaps the same spring as the one mentioned by Pausanias as the spring, above the Ismenion, by which her brother Caanthus was buried.

The Thebans traced their descent from the union of Apollo and Melia, through the heroes Tenerus and Ismenus. According to Larson, while their descent from Apollo—a panhellenic Olympian god—increased their prestige, and connected them to other Greeks, their descent from Melia—a nymph associated with the local landscape—helped to establish their connection with the land that they inhabited.
