= Gran Meliá Don Pepe =

Hotel in Marbella, Spain

Hotel Gran Meliá Don Pepe
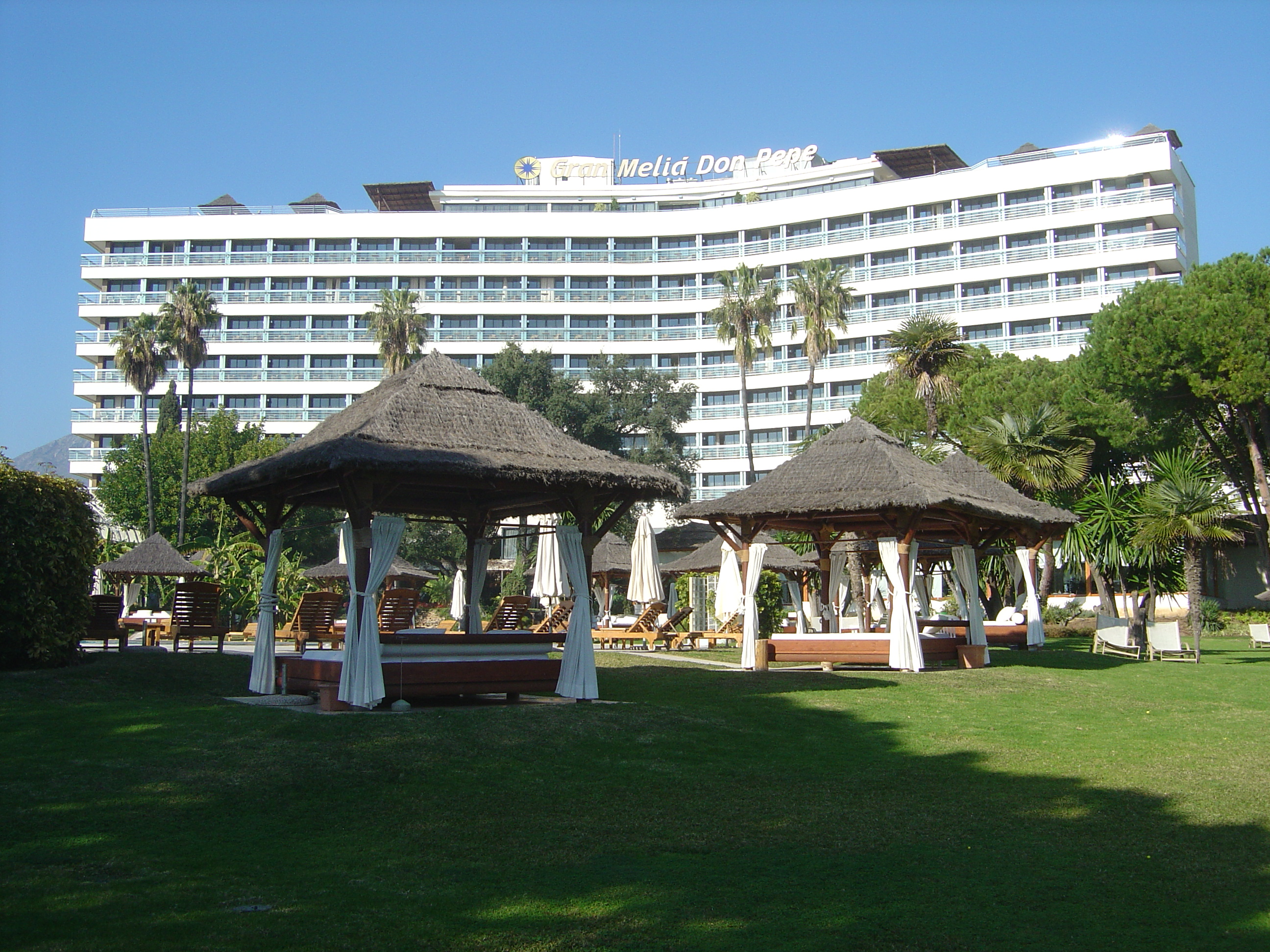

- Location within Andalusia

General information
- Location: Marbella, Spain
- Coordinates: 36°30′27″N 4°54′14″W

The Hotel Gran Meliá Don Pepe is a luxury 5-star hotel in Marbella, Spain. Its three restaurants serve Spanish cuisine; chef Dani García has received some international recognition. In 1974 the hotel was described as having a "private beach" and "elegant decor".

== See also ==
- List of hotels in Spain
