= Melia Kreiling =

Actress

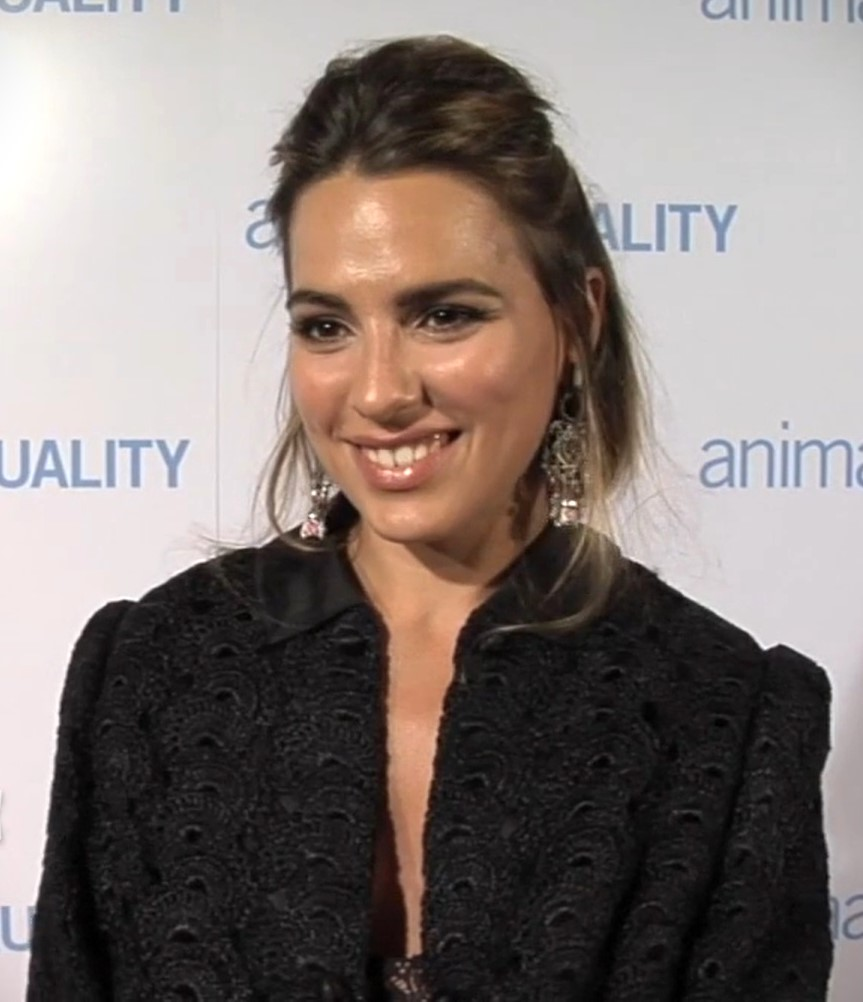
- Kreiling in 2016
- Born: Geneva, Switzerland
- Education: London School of Dramatic Art
- Occupation: Actress
- Years active: 2011–present

Melia Kreiling (born 1990) is an actress. She is known for her roles on television series such as Tyrant and The Last Tycoon, and for her starring role as Alycia in the second season of the CBS summer series Salvation. She also has a brief appearance in the film Guardians of the Galaxy. She also starred as Sofia in the third and fourth seasons of Emily in Paris.

== Early life ==
Kreiling was born in Geneva, Switzerland as the daughter of an American father, "internationally renowned commodities trader" Randall A. Kreiling (1947-2011), who lived and worked internationally in the "global cattle, pork bellies, sugar and metal markets", and a Greek mother, Katia Dimopoulou. She grew up in Athens, where she attended an English school. Afterwards, she attended the National State School of Dance. After moving to Great Britain, she studied at the University of Winchester and the Northern School of Contemporary Dance in Leeds. She received additional acting education at the London School of Dramatic Art.

== Career ==
Kreiling made her film debut in the 2011 short Room to Forget. In the German-speaking world she became known for her role in the historical drama The Borgias. In December 2012 she appeared in a television program about Rosamunde Pilcher and reprised her character in The Other Wife. She made a brief cameo in the American film Guardians of the Galaxy, in which she portrayed the character Bereet. Kreiling played Bathsheba in the 2013 History Channel miniseries The Bible. From 2015–2016, she played the recurring role of Daliyah Al-Yazbek in the FX television series Tyrant.

In February 2018 Kreiling joined the cast of the CBS summer series Salvation in its second season, playing the role of Alycia.

== Filmography ==
Film roles
| Year | Title | Role | Notes |
|---|---|---|---|
| 2012 | Suspension of Disbelief | Juliette | |
| 2013 | Company of Heroes | Kestrel | Direct-to-video film |
| 2013 | Leopard | Kara | |
| 2014 | Committed | Bride Eva | |
| 2014 | Guardians of the Galaxy | Bereet | |
| 2014 | X Moor | Georgia | |
| 2015 | The Healer | Fernanda | |
| 2015 | MindGamers | Stella | |
| 2017 | The Last Note | Hara Lioudaki | |

Television roles
| Year | Title | Role | Notes |
|---|---|---|---|
| 2012 | Rosamunde Pilcher | Eloise Kendall | Episode: "Die andere Frau, Teil 1" |
| 2012 | The Other Wife | Eloise Kendall | Television miniseries |
| 2012–2013 | The Borgias | Bianca | 4 episodes |
| 2013 | The Bible | Bathsheba | Television miniseries; episode: "Kingdom" |
| 2015–2016 | Tyrant | Daliyah Al-Yazbek | Recurring role (season 2); main role (season 3) |
| 2017 | The Last Tycoon | Hannah Taub | Recurring role |
| 2017 | Behind Enemy Lines | Shia Irivani | Unsold television pilot |
| 2018 | Salvation | Alycia Vrettou | Main role (season 2) |
| 2020 | Filthy Rich | Ginger Sweet | Main role |
| 2022 | Mammals | Amandine | Main role |
| 2022-2024 | Emily in Paris | Sofia | 8 episodes (seasons 3 & 4) |
| 2023-2024 | The Pantheons | Marmo Pantheou | Main role |
| 2023 | Zoe | Daphne | Recurring role |
