= Your Friendly Neighborhood Spider-Man season 1 =

Your Friendly Neighborhood Spider-Man
- Season 1
- Promotional poster
- Starring: Hudson Thames; Kari Wahlgren; Grace Song; Eugene Byrd; Zeno Robinson; Colman Domingo; Hugh Dancy; Charlie Cox
- No. of episodes: 10

Release
- Original network: Disney+
- Original release: January 29 – February 19, 2025

Season chronology
- Next → Season 2

The first season of the American animated television series Your Friendly Neighborhood Spider-Man, based on Marvel Comics featuring the character Spider-Man, explores Peter Parker's early days as Spider-Man. It is set in an alternate timeline from the main films and television series of the Marvel Cinematic Universe (MCU) where Norman Osborn becomes Peter's mentor instead of Tony Stark. The season was produced by Marvel Studios Animation, with Jeff Trammell as head writer and Mel Zwyer as supervising director.

Hudson Thames voices Peter Parker / Spider-Man, reprising his role from the Marvel Studios animated series What If...? (2021–2024), with Kari Wahlgren, Grace Song, Eugene Byrd, Zeno Robinson, Colman Domingo, Hugh Dancy, and Charlie Cox also starring. Disney+ announced the series as Spider-Man: Freshman Year in November 2021, with Trammell attached. It was retitled Your Friendly Neighborhood Spider-Man by December 2023. Polygon Pictures and CGCG, Inc. provided the season's animation.

The first season of Your Friendly Neighborhood Spider-Man premiered on the streaming service Disney+ with its first two episodes on January 29, 2025. The rest of its 10-episode run was released in groups until February 19, as part of Phase Five of the MCU. The season received positive reviews from critics for its action, comedy, nostalgia, and animation style. It also received several accolades, including a Children's and Family Emmy Award for its voice directing. A second season was announced in July 2022.

== Episodes ==
No.	Title	Directed by	Written by	Original release date
1	"Amazing Fantasy"	Mel Zwyer	Jeff Trammell	January 29, 2025
On Peter Parker's first day at Midtown High School, sorcerer Stephen Strange emerges from a portal fighting a symbiotic alien. Peter rescues another freshman, Nico Minoru, from the alien. He falls unconscious after being bitten by a spider that also emerged from the portal. Several months later, Peter has developed spider-like abilities and is secretly operating as the vigilante Spider-Man. Due to the destruction of Midtown High caused by Strange's fight with the alien, Peter and Nico—now best friends—are attending Rockford T. Bales High School which does not have the advanced courses and technology that Peter was excited for at Midtown. Also attending Bales are Peter's childhood crush Pearl Pangan and her new boyfriend, football team captain Lonnie Lincoln. On the way to school one day, Peter saves Harry Osborn from a group of thugs who livestream the interaction. Later, he stops two criminals on the run from the police and receives wider public attention. After school, Peter returns to the apartment he lives in with his widowed aunt May Parker and is greeted by businessman Norman Osborn.
2	"The Parker Luck"	Liza Singer	Charlie Neuner	January 29, 2025
Norman offers Peter an exclusive internship at his company, Oscorp, which Peter gladly accepts. The next day, he goes to Oscorp after school and meets fellow interns Jeanne Foucault, Asha, and Amadeus Cho. Peter is discouraged by the stern Bentley Wittman, a scientist who oversees the interns, but enjoys himself more after being assigned to work with scientist Carla Connors on an energy project. Peter misses the school's victory at a football game and is unable to join Nico when they are both invited to a party by Lonnie and Pearl. During a break in his work, Peter sees a news report about a building on fire and goes to investigate as Spider-Man. He finds an arsonist named Butane who has been hired to destroy a building with his high-tech flamethrowers as part of an insurance scam, though he is accidentally destroying the wrong building. Peter subdues Butane and notices a stylized infinity logo on his equipment. Arriving back at Oscorp later than he hoped, Peter is summoned to Norman's office. Norman shows Peter security footage of the latter putting on his Spider-Man suit.
3	"Secret Identity Crisis"	Stu Livingston	Jeff Trammell	February 5, 2025
Peter attempts to deny that he is Spider-Man, but Norman is not convinced. He invites Peter to a private dinner where he explains that he became intent on discovering Spider-Man's identity following the rescue of his son, Harry. Norman created the internship project as a pretense to assemble Jeanne, Asha, Amadeus, and Peter, the most likely candidates for young people who could have created Spider-Man's technology. Peter turns down Norman's offer of partnership, but continues the internship to help May pay her bills. When Lonnie's younger brother Andre joins the local 110th Street gang, Lonnie goes to the gang's headquarters to retrieve him. The gang's leader, Big Donovan, forces Lonnie to join the gang in return for allowing Andre to leave. Criminals Maria Vasquez and James Sanders obtain high-tech gloves and boots from a mysterious benefactor and rob a jewelry shop. Peter fights them and is outmaneuvered by their technology, until Norman contacts him to assist. After defeating the couple, Peter notices the same infinity logo on their technology. Peter accepts Norman's partnership offer.
4	"Hitting the Big Time"	Liza Singer	Charlie Neuner	February 5, 2025
The Avengers become fractured over the Sokovia Accords, a legislative act requiring superheroes to be registered and overseen. Norman believes he and Peter must step up to become the protectors of New York City and has Peter try on various new Oscorp-designed superhero suits. These yield mixed results until they settle on a suit closer to Peter's original Spider-Man design, though it is mostly white rather than the red and blue costume that Peter imagined. Big Donovan sends a reluctant Lonnie to get food for the 110th from a store that is in the territory of a rival gang, the Scorpions. Lonnie is threatened by some of the Scorpions, and when he returns Big Donovan explains that Lonnie and his family can now only be safe from the Scorpions if Lonnie is loyal to the 110th. Peter rescues some bystanders from a group of Russian bank robbers. When he returns to Oscorp, he accidentally reveals his identity to Harry. One of the Russians, Mila Masaryk, escapes with the money they stole and takes it to the benefactor that is creating high-tech gear for various criminals: Dr. Otto Octavius.
5	"The Unicorn Unleashed!"	Stu Livingston	Jeff Trammell	February 5, 2025
Octavius sells Mila a helmet that shoots lasers from the forehead and uses analysis to predict an opponent's movements. A former associate of Norman's, Octavius plans to make a name for himself with the wealth he has gained from selling his technology. Norman decides that, due to his busy schedule, it would be best for Harry to also be involved in the Spider-Man partnership. Mila, calling herself the Unicorn, helps her Russian cohorts escape prison. Harry directs Peter to stop them and he fights the group. Mila nearly kills Peter, but is stopped by her accomplice Mikhail Sytsevich after Peter saved his life when Mila used Mikhail as bait during the fight. Peter apprehends them both, and Mikhail vows revenge for his imprisonment despite Peter's heroics. Peter joins Nico to watch a movie and invites Harry—a well-known socialite—to join them, upsetting Nico. Lonnie is forced to leave football practice to help the 110th in a turf war with the Scorpions. After saving Big Donovan from the Scorpions' leader, Mac Gargan, Lonnie earns the respect of the gang and Big Donovan gives him the moniker "Tombstone".
6	"Duel with the Devil"	Liza Singer	Charlie Neuner	February 12, 2025
Lonnie is kicked off the football team as he continues to skip practice and school classes. He refuses to explain why to Pearl. Peter invites Harry and Nico to spend time at his home in hopes that they will become friends, but their clashing personalities make it difficult. While Norman attends a charity dinner, he learns that someone is breaking into Oscorp and sends Peter to investigate. Peter finds the vigilante Daredevil, who believes Norman is hiding something sinister. The two fight, which ends with Daredevil knocking Peter unconscious. When Peter wakes up, Norman explains that Octavius is behind the technology that criminals have been using and he believes that Octavius hired Daredevil to steal from Oscorp. While Peter is away, Harry accidentally reveals to Nico that Peter is Spider-Man. She confirms this when Peter returns, and leaves upset that he kept this secret from her. Lonnie is followed by Gargan's second-in-command, Carmilla Black, and returns to the 110th's hideout for protection. She tracks him there and informs Gargan, who is equipped with scorpion-like armor by Octavius.
7	"Scorpion Rising"	Stu Livingston	Raven Koné	February 12, 2025
At school, Nico ignores Peter's attempts to apologize for keeping Spider-Man a secret. Peter and Norman deduce that Octavius is using gamma radiation for his technology and begin to trace it around the city to try to locate him. Harry takes Nico out for food in an attempt to get her to forgive Peter. The two begin to bond after he teaches her how to drive and they engage in a street race against an unruly driver. While she still has a hard time forgiving Peter, Harry tells Nico that Peter kept his secret to protect her. Nico apologizes to Harry for how she treated him before and calls him a friend. Pearl learns of Lonnie's involvement with the 110th from Andre, and confronts Lonnie at their hideout. As Lonnie tries to push her away, the gang is attacked by Gargan, now calling himself Scorpion. Tracking the radiation in Gargan's armor, Peter rescues Pearl and Lonnie, who escape with the 110th. Norman, distracted with finding Octavius, provides minimal assistance in the fight and Peter is severely injured by Gargan. Norman locates Octavius and then sends a glider to rescue Peter before the latter is killed.
8	"Tangled Web"	Liza Singer	Charlie Neuner	February 12, 2025
Peter is shaken after his fight with Gargan and questions whether he can win. Norman gives him an ultimatum to step up as Spider-Man or lose their partnership. Peter breaks down in front of May, and she expresses her wish that he still had his uncle Ben to turn to. Norman sends Octavius's location to Thaddeus Ross, the United States Secretary of State, who arrests Octavius for violating the Sokovia Accords with assistance from Iron Man. The next day, Peter goes to Pearl's house to help with an assignment. Lonnie visits and informs her that the 110th is going after Gargan. Pearl breaks up with Lonnie when he refuses to leave the gang. Thanks to a tip from one of Mila and Mikhail's associates, Dmitri Smerdyakov, the gang learns of Octavius's abandoned warehouse and plan to use his technology to combat Gargan. Without Ben, Peter turns to Norman for advice. Norman believes Peter lost to Gargan because he is holding back, and tells him that with great power comes great respect. Harry reveals to Peter that he had Oscorp's scientists develop a new red and blue Spider-Man suit for him.
9	"Hero or Menace"	Liza Singer	Jeff Trammell	February 19, 2025
Norman visits Octavius in prison to gloat about his involvement in the latter's arrest, and to reveal that his technology is being given to Oscorp. Peter stops the 110th's attempt to hijack the technology as it is being transferred. Gargan arrives with the Scorpions and a brawl breaks out which Big Donovan runs away from. Lonnie steps up and searches Octavius's technology for something to use. He is exposed to a mysterious gas which gives him superhuman strength and durability. Lonnie uses his new powers to help Peter fight Gargan. After the latter buries Lonnie under rubble, an enraged Peter takes Norman's advice and stops holding back. He almost kills Gargan before Lonnie breaks free and stops him, convincing him to not cross that line and to remain a hero. Gargan is arrested. Seeing Peter save lives as Spider-Man, Nico forgives him. Norman thanks Peter for stopping Gargan. He then meets with several Oscorp scientists, including Wittman, who are working on various secret projects. One of these is an attempt to replicate Spider-Man's powers by injecting a spider with Peter's blood.
10	"If This Be My Destiny..."	Stu Livingston	Charlie Neuner & Jeff Trammell	February 19, 2025
Norman reveals to the interns that their projects are all being used to create a gateway to space for the secretive Project Monolith. Strange arrives to warn against this, but Norman orders the gateway be activated. The symbiotic alien comes through and attacks. Strange creates a portal that accidentally takes himself and the alien back in time to Peter's first day at Midtown High. One of the spiders that Oscorp injected with Peter's blood escapes through the portal and bites the younger Peter. Strange and present-day Peter send the alien back to space and destroy the gateway. Part of the symbiote remains behind and is found by Norman. Harry creates his own company, the Worldwide Engineering Brigade (W.E.B.), to support young geniuses like the Oscorp interns without exploitation. Invitees include Amadeus, who declines in favor of an engineering job at Oscorp; Jeanne, who is the superhero Finesse and was undercover at Oscorp at the behest of her vigilante partner Daredevil; and Lonnie, who becomes the new leader of the 110th. Later, May visits Peter's incarcerated father, Richard Parker.

== Cast and characters ==
=== Main ===
- Hudson Thames as Peter Parker / Spider-Man
- Kari Wahlgren as May Parker
- Grace Song as Nico Minoru
- Eugene Byrd as Lonnie Lincoln / Tombstone
- Zeno Robinson as Harry Osborn
- Colman Domingo as Norman Osborn
- Hugh Dancy as Otto Octavius
- Charlie Cox as Daredevil

=== Recurring ===
- Cathy Ang as Pearl Pangan
- Erica Luttrell as Mrs. Lincoln and Asha
- Roger Craig Smith as Phil Grayfield
- Anjali Kunapaneni as Jeanne Foucault / Finesse
- Aleks Le as Amadeus Cho
- Paul F. Tompkins as Bentley Wittman
- Zehra Fazal as Carla Connors
- Leilani Barrett as Big Donovan
- Ettore Ewen as Bulldozer
- Anairis Quiñones as Carmilla Black
- Jonathan Medina as Mac Gargan / Scorpion

=== Notable guests ===
- Robin Atkin Downes as Dr. Stephen Strange
- Travis Willingham as Thaddeus Ross
- Zach Cherry as Klev
- Mick Wingert as Tony Stark / Iron Man
- Josh Keaton as Richard Parker

== Production ==
=== Development ===
Marvel Studios Animation's Spider-Man: Freshman Year was announced during a Disney+ Day event in November 2021, with Jeff Trammell as head writer. The series was retitled Your Friendly Neighborhood Spider-Man by December 2023, and in January 2025 Trammell said the series was not limited to covering one school year per season. Mel Zwyer served as supervising director, with Liza Singer and Stu Livingston as episodic directors. Marvel Studios's Kevin Feige, Louis D'Esposito, Brad Winderbaum, and Dana Vasquez-Eberhardt were executive producers alongside Trammell.

=== Writing ===
Writers for the season included Trammell, Charlie Neuner, Raven Kone, and Halima Lucas. Tramell wrote half of the season's episodes. Each episode title is a reference to, or is inspired by, comic book titles or other elements from the comics. The series was originally planned to be set within the "Sacred Timeline" of the Marvel Cinematic Universe (MCU), before Peter Parker / Spider-Man's introduction in the film Captain America: Civil War (2016), and depict the character's origin story. The creative team found this to be too restrictive regarding which characters and comic book elements could be included, so they decided to move the series to an alternate timeline, taking advantage of the MCU's multiverse concept. The story, set in an alternate reality, begins similarly to Civil War but depicts Norman Osborn becoming Peter's mentor instead of Tony Stark. Peter's origin story is still told in the season, though it differs from previous depictions: Peter is bitten by a spider that falls out of a portal created by Dr. Stephen Strange as he is fighting a symbiotic alien, and the season finale reveals that this spider was injected with Peter's own blood and then taken back in time by Strange's portal, creating a temporal paradox in which Peter gains his abilities from himself.

Trammell said the series would explore Peter's identity pre-Spider-Man and how his superhero career began. The creative team took inspiration from early The Amazing Spider-Man comic books by Stan Lee and Steve Ditko, as well as previous Spider-Man animated series. Trammell took specific inspiration from the way characters were developed in The Spectacular Spider-Man (2008–09). He wanted to use the series to approach familiar ideas and characters in new ways, such as Norman Osborn's role as Peter's mentor, and Peter's father Richard being alive. Winderbaum said the series was "so essentially Spider-Man" because it features Peter trying to juggle high school, caring for his aunt May, and being a superhero. He said the large ensemble of characters allowed for interesting relationships and stakes, and an emphasis on the "neighborhood" from the series' title by featuring supporting characters in prominent roles; Winderbaum compared this to Trammell's work on the animated series Craig of the Creek (2018–2025).

Several characters not usually associated with Spider-Man are included in the series, including Nico Minoru in the role of Peter's best friend, as well as Jeanne Foucault / Finesse and Amadeus Cho. Trammell also considered including a young Jessica Jones as one of Peter's classmates. In addition to setting up key members of Spider-Man's rogues gallery such as Otto Octavius / Doctor Octopus and Mac Gargan / Scorpion, the season features some lesser-known villains from the comics including Unicorn and Butane. The superhero team Fantastic Four was off-limits to Trammell because Marvel was saving them for the MCU film The Fantastic Four: First Steps (2025). He was also asked not to use the villain Big Wheel in the series.

=== Casting and voice recording ===
At Comic-Con in July 2022, Charlie Cox was announced to be reprising his role as Daredevil from previous MCU media for the series, while Paul F. Tompkins was cast as Bentley Wittman. Cox recorded his lines in 2021 during breaks in filming for the live-action MCU series She-Hulk: Attorney at Law (2022). In September 2023, a United States Copyright Office filing for the series revealed that Hudson Thames was voicing Peter Parker / Spider-Man, reprising his role from the first season of Marvel Studios Animation's What If...? (2021), with Eugene Byrd as Lonnie Lincoln, Grace Song as Nico Minoru, Hugh Dancy as Otto Octavius, Kari Wahlgren as May Parker, and Zeno Robinson as Harry Osborn. The creative team were struggling to settle on an actor for Norman Osborn who they felt could live up to the character's reputation, until Zwyer suggested casting Colman Domingo. Trammell thought that was a "genius idea" and they immediately approached the actor, who was "super excited" to take on the role. Domingo's casting was announced in August 2024.

In December 2024, Cathy Ang was revealed as the voice of Pearl Pangan. Ahead of the series' premiere in January 2025, more actors were revealed: Robin Atkin Downes as Dr. Stephen Strange; Anjali Kunapaneni as Jeanne Foucault / Finesse; Erica Luttrell as Asha; Aleks Le as Amadeus Cho; Zehra Fazal as Carla Connors; Jake Green as Butane; Mick Wingert as Tony Stark / Iron Man, reprising his role from What If...?; Roger Craig Smith as James Sanders / Speed Demon and Dmitri Smerdyakov / Chameleon; Anairis Quiñones as Maria Vasquez and Carmilla Black; Travis Willingham as Mikhail Sytsevich and Thaddeus Ross; Sarah Natochenny as Mila Masaryk / Unicorn; Leilani Barrett as Big Donovan; Jonathan Medina as Mac Gargan / Scorpion; and former wrestler Ettore Ewen as Bulldozer. Ewen began work on the season in 2022. Additionally, Zach Cherry reprises his MCU role as Klev, and Josh Keaton voices Peter's father Richard. Keaton starred as Peter Parker / Spider-Man in The Spectacular Spider-Man and Trammell was excited for him to join the series.

=== Animation and design ===
The series' art style pays homage to the early The Amazing Spider-Man comic books, specifically those featuring art by Steve Ditko and John Romita Sr. Trammell described the series as a "moving comic book", which is achieved through 3D cel-shaded animation provided by Polygon Pictures and CGCG, Inc. Development on the season took four years to complete, finishing in August 2024. Trammell said it could have been finished earlier in 2024, but the season kept having various finalizing stages pushed back in order for Marvel Studios to accommodate other series.

Leo Romero was the lead character designer, with comic book artists Chris Samnee, Paolo Rivera, and Ethan Young also working on the series. Trammell praised Romero for modernizing the designs while retaining classic elements. They leaned further into comic book references for Peter's Spider-Man suits and some of the villains' costumes, including those for Octavius and Gargan. Peter starts the series in a homemade suit made from "gym pants, sneakers, goggles, a blue sweatshirt, red undershirt, knee pads, very clunky web-shooters, and a red logo on the chest". He rejects several Oscorp suit designs which are based on alternate suits that Peter wears when he takes on different personas during the 1998 "Identity Crisis" comic book event: a golden suit with a red cape used for the "Prodigy" persona, a purple suit with hover-wings used for the "Hornet" persona, and a dark blue wingsuit used for the "Dusk" persona. Peter goes on to wear a white and blue Oscorp suit resembling Spider-Man's Future Foundation costume from the comics, and then a "classic 60s" red and blue suit. Daredevil wears a black suit with red lines reminiscent of the costume worn by the character in the 2010 "Shadowland" comic book event. The opening credits feature splash pages inspired by comic book art. Romero reworked these to reference events in the series and to match its style.

=== Music ===
Leo Birenberg and Zach Robinson were revealed to be composing the series' score in June 2024. A soundtrack album featuring excerpts from Birenberg and Robinson's score was released digitally on February 21.

Your Friendly Neighborhood Spider-Man (Original Soundtrack)
No.	Title	Length
1.	"Neighbor Like Me" (performed by The Math Club featuring Relaye and Melo Makes Music)	3:33
2.	"Your Friendly Neighborhood Spider-Man"	2:07
3.	"With Great Power..."	2:06
4.	"Lonnie Lincoln"	0:59
5.	"Good Deed"	0:37
6.	"Swing Into Action"	2:04
7.	"Spider-Intern"	1:16
8.	"Up in Flames"	1:39
9.	"Another Chance"	1:22
10.	"Lunch on Me"	1:09
11.	"Armed and Dangerous"	2:22
12.	"The 110th"	1:32
13.	"Dude at the Desk"	0:48
14.	"We Need More Heroes"	2:20
15.	"Doctor's Orders"	3:06
16.	"Lonnie and Pearl"	1:54
17.	"Scorpions"	1:26
18.	"The Devil's Web"	2:34
19.	"Street Race"	2:08
20.	"Sting Operation"	2:10
21.	"Arach-nemeses"	1:18
22.	"Hanging by a Thread"	3:58
23.	"Just a Kid"	1:40
24.	"Running Late"	1:02
25.	"Big Argon Fan"	1:07
26.	"I Have to See This Through"	2:21
27.	"Spidey-Sense"	3:44
28.	"Araña"	2:12
29.	"Silk and Stone"	1:27
30.	"People Look Up to You"	3:33
31.	"Déjà Vu"	3:30
32.	"I Became Me"	1:47
33.	"Your Friendly Neighborhood Montage"	4:32
Total length:		63:00

== Marketing ==
The series was discussed during Marvel Studios Animation's panel at the 2022 San Diego Comic-Con, where character art was revealed. The series was featured in a sizzle reel of Marvel Studios Animation's 2024 series in December 2023. Trammell, Thames, and Domingo promoted the series during Marvel Studios Animation's panel at the D23 Expo in August 2024, where Domingo's role as Norman was announced and footage was shown. Footage from the series was included in a video that was released by Disney+ in October, announcing the release schedule for Marvel Television and Marvel Animation projects through the end of 2025.

A trailer for the series was released at the end of December, following the conclusion of What If...?'s third season. Toussaint Egan of Polygon described the series as "long-awaited", and Jordan King at Empire called it "hotly anticipated". King and IGN's Adam Bankhurst both highlighted the trailer's combination of classic Spider-Man references—including the art style and theme song—with contemporary animation and imagery. Discussing the trailer for Gizmodo, Justin Carter said it was "well worth the wait" and felt the series would be appreciated by people who wanted the MCU's Spider-Man to have some "smaller adventures".

== Release ==
The first season of Your Friendly Neighborhood Spider-Man premiered with its first two episodes on Disney+ on January 29, 2025. The remaining eight episodes were released weekly in groups of two or three until February 19, as part of Phase Five of the MCU. Chris Agar of ComicBook.com said this release schedule was unusual for an MCU series and suggested that it was designed to avoid overlapping with the debut of the MCU series Daredevil: Born Again in March. Your Friendly Neighborhood Spider-Man was previously scheduled to be released in 2024, and the copyright filing for the first episode indicated an approximate release on November 2 of that year, before the January 2025 premiere was announced. On February 19, the first episode was made available for free on YouTube. The season aired on Disney's cable channel FXX from June 30 to July 4, 2025.

== Reception ==
=== Viewership ===
Whip Media's viewership tracking app, TV Time, which tracks viewership data for the more than 25 million worldwide users of its TV Time app, reported that Your Friendly Neighborhood Spider-Man was the most-anticipated new television show of January 2025. Spider-Man was one of the ten most-streamed original series in the U.S. from February 2–9, according to Whip Media. According to market research company Parrot Analytics, which looks at consumer engagement in consumer research, streaming, downloads, and on social media, the series was the most in-demand Disney+ TV show during the week of February 28 to March 6. The animated series ranked No. 1, surpassing The Acolyte, which came in second. This high level of demand was observed not only in the U.S. but also in international markets such as Russia, the UK, Canada, and Australia. TVision, using its Power Score to evaluate CTV programming through viewership and engagement across over 1,000 apps, reported it as the fifth most-streamed series from February 3—9. Streaming analytics firm FlixPatrol, which monitors daily updated VOD charts and streaming ratings across the globe, announced that Spider-Man was the most-streamed Disney+ title on February 9.

=== Critical response ===
The season received positive reviews for its action, comedy, nostalgia, and animation style, though some critics found the latter to be jarring at first. The review aggregator website Rotten Tomatoes reported a 97% approval score with an average rating of 8.2/10, based on 35 reviews. The site's critical consensus reads, "Embracing the wholesome aesthetics of the webslinger's original comic run while adding some fresh plot wrinkles, this family-friendly Spider-Man is a lovable incarnation of the Marvel superhero." Metacritic, which uses a weighted average, assigned the season a score of 77 out of 100 based on 10 critics, indicating "generally favorable reviews".

=== Accolades ===
Domingo was named an honorable mention for TVLine's "Performer of the Week" for the week of February 17, 2025, for his performance in the last two episodes of the first season. Eric Goldman wrote for the site that Domingo made the season's slow-burn approach to Norman Osborn work well, providing "the right underlying tension" behind the character's support for Spider-Man.

Accolades received by Your Friendly Neighborhood Spider-Man season 1
Award	Date of ceremony	Category	Recipient(s)	Result	Ref.
Artios Awards	February 26, 2026	Animated Program For Television	Sara Jane Sherman	Nominated	
Children's and Family Emmy Awards	March 2, 2026	Outstanding Voice Directing for an Animated Series	Sara Jane Sherman (for "If This Be My Destiny...")	Won	
Children's and Family Emmy Awards	March 2, 2026	Outstanding Show Open	Your Friendly Neighborhood Spider-Man	Nominated	
Critics' Choice Television Awards	January 4, 2026	Best Animated Series	Your Friendly Neighborhood Spider-Man	Nominated	
Golden Trailer Awards	May 29, 2025	Best Animation/Family (TV Spot) for a TV/Streaming Series	Your Friendly Neighborhood Spider-Man "All Streaming"	Nominated	
Golden Trailer Awards	May 29, 2025	Best Animation TrailerByte for a Feature Film	Your Friendly Neighborhood Spider-Man "Protect"	Won	
Saturn Awards	March 8, 2026	Best Animated Television Series or Special	Your Friendly Neighborhood Spider-Man	Nominated	
TCA Awards	August 20, 2025	Outstanding Achievement in Family Programming	Your Friendly Neighborhood Spider-Man	Nominated	

== Other media ==
In September 2024, Marvel Comics announced a five-issue comic book prequel series, also titled Your Friendly Neighborhood Spider-Man, that was written by Christos Gage and features art by Eric Gapstur. Trammell explained that the comic fills a gap in the timeline of the series' first episode, and said it was possible that more comic books could be written to fill other timeline gaps later in the series. The comic includes characters not featured in the series such as Silvio Manfredi / Silvermane, Crusher Hogan, Man Mountain Marko, and the Enforcers members Montana, Fancy Dan, and Ox. The prequel comic was published from December 11, 2024, to April 23, 2025.
