= Your Friendly Neighborhood Spider-Man season 2 =

Your Friendly Neighborhood Spider-Man
- Season 2
- Promotional poster
- Showrunner: Jeff Trammell
- Starring: Hudson Thames; Colman Domingo; Charlie Cox

Release
- Original network: Disney+

Season chronology
- ← Previous; Season 1 Next → Season 3

The second season of the American animated television series Your Friendly Neighborhood Spider-Man, based on Marvel Comics featuring the character Spider-Man, explores Peter Parker's early days as Spider-Man. It is set in an alternate timeline from the main films and television series of the Marvel Cinematic Universe (MCU). The season is produced by Marvel Studios Animation, with Jeff Trammell as showrunner and head writer.

Hudson Thames voices Peter Parker / Spider-Man, reprising his role from the Marvel Studios animated series What If...? (2021–2024), with Colman Domingo and Charlie Cox also starring. The season was announced as Spider-Man: Sophomore Year in July 2022. The series was retitled Your Friendly Neighborhood Spider-Man by December 2023.

The second season of Your Friendly Neighborhood Spider-Man is scheduled to premiere on the streaming service Disney+ on January 13, 2027 as part of Phase Six of the MCU. A third season was confirmed in January 2025.

== Episodes ==
Jeff Trammell and another writer wrote the season finale.

== Cast and characters ==
=== Main ===
- Hudson Thames as Peter Parker / Spider-Man
- Colman Domingo as Norman Osborn
- Charlie Cox as Daredevil

=== Notable guests ===
- Ettore Ewen as Bulldozer
- Josh Keaton as Eddie Brock

Returning characters from the first season include Nico Minoru, Harry Osborn, Otto Octavius / Doctor Octopus, Dmitri Smerdyakov / Chameleon, Mac Gargan / Scorpion, and Jeanne Foucault / Finesse. Characters to be introduced in the second season include Gwen Stacy / Ghost-Spider, Venom, Lizard, Rhino, and Shocker.

== Production ==
=== Development ===
Marvel Studios Animation's Spider-Man: Freshman Year was announced during a Disney+ Day event in November 2021, with Jeff Trammell as head writer and showrunner. He envisioned a four-season story arc for the series. A second season was announced in July 2022 with the title Spider-Man: Sophomore Year. The series was retitled Your Friendly Neighborhood Spider-Man by December 2023, and in January 2025 Trammell said the series was not limited to covering one school year per season.

=== Writing ===
While he wrote half of the first season's episodes, Trammell was only able to write around two episodes for the second season because of his other commitments as showrunner; this led to the expansion of the writing team for the second season. The writers' outline for the season features 56 pages of story elements. The season's scripts were written by January 2025. Marvel Studios executive Brad Winderbaum compared the character dynamics in the second season to the television series Succession (2018–2023), stating that the season features a "power scaling" of "characters challenging other characters"; he cited the interactions between protagonist Peter Parker / Spider-Man with Norman and Harry Osborn as an example, declaring that "[t]here is no stronger, more wild dynamic" than that of these characters in the season. After the first season "set the board" with some lesser-known members of Spider-Man's rogues gallery, this season further expands on key Spider-Man villains Norman Osborn, Otto Octavius / Doctor Octopus and Mac Gargan / Scorpion, while introducing Eddie Brock, Lizard, and Rhino.

=== Casting and voice recording ===
Main cast members returning from the first season include Hudson Thames as Peter Parker / Spider-Man, Colman Domingo as Norman Osborn, and Charlie Cox as Daredevil.

Former wrestler Ettore Ewen was working on the season by January 2025, after voicing Bulldozer in the first season. The following month, after the first season had been released, Trammell announced that the character Gwen Stacy / Ghost-Spider would be appearing in the second season. In August 2026, Josh Keaton announced that he was voicing Eddie Brock in the season after voicing Peter's father Richard in the first.

=== Animation and design ===
The series' art style pays homage to the early The Amazing Spider-Man comic books, specifically those featuring art by Steve Ditko and John Romita Sr. Trammell described the series as a "moving comic book", which is achieved through 3D cel-shaded animation. By February 2025, animatics for the season were halfway done and some final animation was already completed. Development on the season was completed by June 2026. Daredevil wears his classic red costume in the second season, instead of the black suit with red lines from the first season.

== Marketing ==
Footage from the second season was included in a sizzle reel that was shown at Disney's upfront presentation in May 2025. More footage was shown during a panel for Marvel Television and Marvel Animation at New York Comic Con 2025 in October, and at a Spider-Man panel during Disney's D23 convention in August 2026 where the premiere month was also announced. Trammell promoted the season at New York Comic Con 2026 in October, during which the release date was announced and more footage was shown.

== Release ==
The second season of Your Friendly Neighborhood Spider-Man is scheduled to premiere on the streaming service Disney+ in January 13, 2027, as part of Phase Six of the MCU. It was originally expected to be released in late 2026, but Winderbaum said Marvel wanted to give the season room to "live and breathe" relative to the studio's other 2026 projects.

== Other media ==
In September 2026, Marvel Comics announced a four-issue comic book prequel series, titled Your Friendly Neighborhood Spider-Man Season 2, that was written by Christos Gage and features art by Eric Gapstur; both returned from the series' first prequel comic series. Gage developed the comic in coordination with Trammell. It is set between the first and second season of the series, and introduces several members of Spider-Man's rogues' gallery, including Flint Marko / Sandman, and Wilbur Day / Stilt-Man. The first issue is scheduled for release on December 9.
