= Marvel Zombies (TV series) =

2025 Marvel Studios animated series

- Genre: Adult animation; Horror; Superhero; Zombie apocalypse
- Created by: Bryan Andrews; Zeb Wells
- Based on: Marvel Comics
- Showrunner: Bryan Andrews
- Directed by: Bryan Andrews
- Starring: Iman Vellani; Dominique Thorne; Hailee Steinfeld; Kerry Condon; Kenna Ramsey; Todd Williams; Kari Wahlgren; Florence Pugh; David Harbour; Simu Liu; Awkwafina; Randall Park; Feodor Chin; Wyatt Russell; Rama Vallury; Elizabeth Olsen; Hudson Thames; Paul Rudd; Greg Furman; Adam Hugill; Daniel Swain; Sheila Atim; Tessa Thompson; F. Murray Abraham; Zenobia Shroff
- Music by: Laura Karpman; Nora Kroll-Rosenbaum
- Country of origin: United States
- Original language: English
- No. of seasons: 1
- No. of episodes: 4

Production
- Executive producers: Brad Winderbaum; Kevin Feige; Louis D'Esposito; Dana Vasquez-Eberhardt; Zeb Wells; Bryan Andrews
- Producers: Danielle Costa; Carrie Wassenaar
- Editors: Joel Fisher; Graham Fisher; Anton Capaldo-Smith
- Running time: 31–37 minutes
- Production company: Marvel Studios Animation

Original release
- Network: Disney+
- Release: September 24, 2025 – present

Related
- What If...?; Marvel Cinematic Universe television series

Marvel Zombies is an American adult animated television series created by Bryan Andrews and Zeb Wells for the streaming service Disney+, based on the Marvel Comics series of the same name. It is the 16th television series in the Marvel Cinematic Universe (MCU) from Marvel Studios and is produced by Marvel Studios Animation. The series is a spin-off of the animated series What If...? (2021–2024), set in the alternate timeline introduced in the first season episode "What If... Zombies?!" (2021). Continuing from that episode, Marvel Zombies follows a group of survivors as they risk their lives fighting superpowered zombies to save the world. Andrews served as showrunner and director, with Wells as head writer.

The series features an ensemble cast including Iman Vellani, Dominique Thorne, Hailee Steinfeld, Kerry Condon, Kenna Ramsey, Todd Williams, Kari Wahlgren, Florence Pugh, David Harbour, Simu Liu, Awkwafina, Randall Park, Feodor Chin, Wyatt Russell, Rama Vallury, Elizabeth Olsen, Hudson Thames, Paul Rudd, Greg Furman, Adam Hugill, Daniel Swain, Sheila Atim, Tessa Thompson, F. Murray Abraham, and Zenobia Shroff. Marvel Studios was developing several animated series in addition to What If...? by June 2021, including a spin-off based on "What If... Zombies?!" which was announced in November. Wells and Andrews were both involved by then. The series features the same animation style as What If...?, with Stellar Creative Lab returning from that series to provide the animation. It is Marvel Studios Animation's first series to be rated TV-MA.

Marvel Zombies was released on Disney+ on September 24, 2025, and consists of four episodes. It is a part of Phase Six of the MCU. It received generally positive reviews from critics. Three continuation specials, subtitled The Winter Soldier, The Fist of Khonshu, and The Last Guardian, are set to be released in 2027, 2028, and 2029, respectively, with The Winter Soldier part of Phase Six and the latter two part of Phase Seven.

== Premise ==
Marvel Zombies is set in the alternate timeline introduced in the What If...? episode "What If... Zombies?!" (2021), where a virus has turned most of the world's population, including the Avengers, into zombies. The series follows a group of survivors as they discover the key to bringing an end to the zombie plague, which leads them to risk their lives traveling across a dystopian landscape and fighting superpowered zombies to save the world.

== Cast and characters ==
- Iman Vellani as Kamala Khan / Ms. Marvel:
  A teenage mutant from Jersey City who wears a magical bangle that unlocks her ability to harness cosmic energy and create hard light constructs. Vellani said Kamala was central to the series, with the creators describing her role as "the Frodo of the story" in reference to the character Frodo Baggins from J. R. R. Tolkien's novel The Lord of the Rings (1954–55).
- Dominique Thorne as Riri Williams / Ironheart: A former MIT student and genius inventor from Chicago who created a suit of armor that rivals the one built by Tony Stark / Iron Man
- Hailee Steinfeld as Kate Bishop: A young woman who trained to become a master archer after being saved by Clint Barton as a child
- Kerry Condon as F.R.I.D.A.Y.: An artificial intelligence (AI) created by Stark
- Kenna Ramsey as Okoye: A zombie and the former general of the Dora Milaje, Wakanda's all-female special forces
- Todd Williams as Blade Knight:
  A half-vampire "daywalker" who hunts vampires and has become the avatar of Khonshu, Moon Knight, following the death of the mantle's previous bearer, Marc Spector. Since becoming the avatar of Khonshu, Blade Knight no longer needs to consume blood.
- Kari Wahlgren as Melina Vostokoff: A seasoned spy and scientist trained in the Red Room as a Black Widow who is a mother figure to Yelena Belova
- Florence Pugh as Yelena Belova: A highly skilled spy and assassin who was trained in the Red Room as a Black Widow
- David Harbour as Alexei Shostakov / Red Guardian: The Soviet super soldier counterpart to Captain America and a father figure to Belova
- Simu Liu as Xu Shang-Chi:
  A highly skilled martial artist who was trained at a young age to be an assassin by his father Xu Wenwu. In the series, Shang-Chi was bitten by a zombie on his right arm, and so he uses the mystical Ten Rings to prevent the infection from spreading to the rest of his body.
- Awkwafina as Katy Chen: Shang-Chi's best friend and former co-worker as a hotel valet who wields the Ten Rings alongside him
- Randall Park as Jimmy Woo: A former FBI agent
- Feodor Chin as Xu Wenwu: Shang-Chi's father who is the leader of the Ten Rings organization and the original wielder of the mystical Ten Rings
- Wyatt Russell as John Walker: A former captain of the U.S. Army Rangers
- Rama Vallury as Helmut Zemo: A Sokovian baron and terrorist
- Elizabeth Olsen as Wanda Maximoff / Scarlet Witch / Red Queen / Queen of the Dead: A former Avenger turned zombie who can harness chaos magic, engage in telepathy and telekinesis, and alter reality
- Hudson Thames as Peter Parker / Spider-Man: A young man who received spider-like abilities after being bitten by a radioactive spider
- Paul Rudd as Scott Lang / Ant-Man:
  A former petty criminal and superhero. The character's still-living head was preserved in a jar after he lost his body in the same process that cured him of the infection, as depicted in the What If...? episode "What If... Zombies?!" (2021).
- Greg Furman as Thor: The Asgardian god of thunder and a founding Avenger, based on the Norse mythological deity of the same name
- Adam Hugill as Rintrah: A minotaur-like being from R'Vaal who is a former student at Kamar-Taj
- Daniel Swain as the London Master: A Master of the Mystic Arts
- Sheila Atim as Sara: A Master of the Mystic Arts
- Tessa Thompson as Valkyrie: The last surviving member of an all-female group of Asgardian warriors
- F. Murray Abraham and Piotr Michael as Khonshu: The Egyptian god of the moon. Abraham voices Khonshu in the third episode while Michael voices Khonshu in the fourth episode.
- Zenobia Shroff as Muneeba Khan: Kamala's mother

Additionally, Isaac Robinson-Smith, Debra Wilson, and Alison Haislip voice the survivors Rick, Denise, and Sandra, respectively. Other actors in minor voice roles include Dave Boat, Terri Douglas, Robin Atkin Downes, Matthew Yang King, Andrew Morgado, Ashley Peldon, Michael Ralph, Fred Tatasciore, Mike Vaughn, and Matthew Wood.

Characters making non-speaking appearances include survivors Ikaris, Death Dealer, T'Challa / Black Panther, Rocket Raccoon, Groot, and Bruce Banner / Infinity Hulk, as well as the zombies of Clint Barton / Hawkeye, Steve Rogers / Captain America, Emil Blonsky / Abomination, Ava Starr / Ghost, Carol Danvers / Captain Marvel, Namor, Thanos, Hank Pym / Ant-Man, Janet van Dyne / Wasp, and Hope van Dyne / Wasp. The character Uatu / Watcher also makes a non-speaking cameo appearance.

== Episodes ==
Season and specials	Episodes	Originally released
Season 1	4	September 24, 2025
The Winter Soldier	2	October 2027
The Fist of Khonshu	2	October 2028
The Last Guardian	2	October 2029

=== Season 1 (2025) ===
No. overall	No. in season	Title	Directed by	Written by	Original release date
1	1	Episode 1	Bryan Andrews	Teleplay by : Zeb Wells; Story by : Bryan Andrews and Zeb Wells	September 24, 2025
Five years after a zombie virus devastates Earth, Kamala Khan, Kate Bishop, Riri Williams, and F.R.I.D.A.Y. survive together in New York City. They find a shrunken transmitter device inside a zombified Dr. Erik Selvig and travel to the North Institute, a S.H.I.E.L.D. base in Ohio, to activate it. En route, the group unknowingly enters an ongoing battle between Ikaris and a zombified Carol Danvers. Amidst the chaos, Danvers kills Kate, Riri is bitten by a zombie, and both Riri and F.R.I.D.A.Y. sacrifice themselves to take Kamala away from the battlefield. Kamala is saved by Blade Knight, the current avatar of the Egyptian moon god Khonshu, who takes her to Ohio. Upon arriving at the North Institute, Kamala and Blade encounter Melina Vostokoff, Alexei Shostakov, and Yelena Belova, who are guarded by Melina's mind-controlled zombies. The group determines that the transmitter must be used in outer space to broadcast a signal to the Nova Corps. The North Institute is attacked by a horde led by a zombified Okoye serving the Queen of the Dead, Wanda Maximoff. The horde, which includes the zombified Steve Rogers, Clint Barton, Ava Starr, and Emil Blonsky, overwhelms the base's defenses. Alexei kills Rogers, Blade kills Ava, and Melina sacrifices herself to allow the others to escape. Blade reveals that he knows of a ship capable of reaching space.
2	2	Episode 2	Bryan Andrews	Teleplay by : Zeb Wells; Story by : Bryan Andrews and Zeb Wells	September 24, 2025
In a flashback, Xu Shang-Chi, his best friend Katy Chen, FBI officer Jimmy Woo, and survivors Rick, Denise, and Sandra are saved from a horde by the Ten Rings organization led by Shang-Chi's father Xu Wenwu. When Shang-Chi is bitten, Wenwu bestows the mystical ten rings to Shang-Chi to contain the infection and sacrifices himself to give time for Death Dealer to help the group escape. In the present, after fighting off Skrull bandits, Shang-Chi's group arrives at Helmut Zemo's sanctuary, the Raft, along with Kamala's group. Both groups agree to work together and Blade reveals that the spaceship is located in New Asgard. Along the way, Zemo attempts to sacrifice Kamala's group to the infected Talokanil for safe passage. Instead, a zombified Namor leads his people to attack the Raft while Zemo and John Walker attempt to flee in an escape pod. Namor kills Walker, Rick, Denise, and Sandra before Kamala kills him with the group's help. When the Raft begins to sink, Yelena sacrifices herself and stays behind to manually override the pod's launch. The group successfully escapes and travels to New Asgard, while Yelena toasts her fallen allies before the zombies break in and kill her.
3	3	Episode 3	Bryan Andrews	Teleplay by : Zeb Wells; Story by : Bryan Andrews and Zeb Wells	September 24, 2025
In a flashback, Peter Parker, Scott Lang's head, and T'Challa arrive in Wakanda only to see that the country has been conquered by a zombified Thanos. They fight Thanos alongside Thor, Rocket, and Groot, but Thanos kills Rocket and Groot, gravely injures Thor, and attempts to snap the Infinity Gauntlet. T'Challa sacrifices himself to push Thanos into Wakanda's vibranium core and destroys the Infinity Stones while Parker and Lang are saved by the remaining sorcerers of Kamar-Taj: Rintrah, Sara, and the London Master. In the present, Kamala's group reaches New Asgard, with Khonshu convincing Valkyrie to let them inside. The Asgardians have been feasting on food provided by the "Queen of Sokovia", revealed to be Wanda herself, who explains that she has regained control and is actually after Kamala's powers to use them to "heal" the world. Wanda then reveals that the food she provided is actually zombie body parts in disguise, infecting the Asgardians and Alexei, who also ate it. The zombies kill Zemo, Death Dealer, and Woo while Thor fights Wanda to buy time for the group to escape in an Asgardian ship into space. Kamala activates the transmitter, but the already-stationed Nova Corps reveal that Earth has been quarantined and order the group to turn back or be incinerated.
4	4	Episode 4	Bryan Andrews	Teleplay by : Zeb Wells; Story by : Bryan Andrews and Zeb Wells	September 24, 2025
The Nova Corps shoot down the ship, but the group is rescued by the sorcerers of Kamar-Taj, who reveal that Bruce Banner willingly absorbed the Infinity Stones' energy after their destruction and has transformed into "Infinity Hulk" to prevent it from destroying Earth. Having amassed enough zombies to defeat Hulk, Wanda arrives to take the stones' energy for herself. Hulk fights off the zombies before the group arrive to defend him, but they are soon overpowered. A zombified Thor arrives and kills Blade, Sara, and the London Master as the overwhelming hordes also kill Shang-Chi, Katy, Valkyrie, Rintrah, Parker, and Lang. Hulk unleashes a powerful blast to kill Thor, but it leaves him vulnerable and allows Wanda to take the stones' energy. Despite her initial refusal, Kamala is persuaded by Wanda to help her remake the world. After a blinding explosion, Kamala wakes up and reunites with Riri and Kate, with everything seeming to have gone back to normal. However, reality flickers, and the real Riri tells Kamala she has hacked the system and that what she is seeing is not real.

=== The Winter Soldier ===
No. overall	No.	Title	Directed by	Written by	Original release date
5	1	TBA	Bryan Andrews	Jennifer Muro	October 2027
6	2	TBA	Bryan Andrews	Jennifer Muro	October 2027

=== The Fist of Khonshu ===
No. overall	No.	Title	Directed by	Written by	Original release date
7	1	TBA	Bryan Andrews	Jennifer Muro	October 2028
8	2	TBA	Bryan Andrews	Jennifer Muro	October 2028

=== The Last Guardian ===
No. overall	No.	Title	Directed by	Written by	Original release date
9	1	TBA	Bryan Andrews	Jennifer Muro	October 2029
10	2	TBA	Bryan Andrews	Jennifer Muro	October 2029

== Production ==
=== Development ===
By June 2021, Marvel Studios Animation was developing a slate of at least three more series in addition to their Disney+ series What If...? (2021–2024). The next month, the series were said to be in various stages of development and were not expected to debut until at least 2023. A Marvel Zombies animated series was announced during a Disney+ Day event in November 2021, based on the Marvel Comics series of the same name. Marvel Studios president Kevin Feige had previously expressed interest in a live-action Marvel Zombies adaptation in 2013, but was not able to accurately adapt the storyline to film due to the MCU's target demographic. Bryan Andrews returned as director from What If...? and also served as showrunner, with Zeb Wells—a writer for the Marvel Cinematic Universe (MCU) series She-Hulk: Attorney at Law (2022) and the films The Marvels (2023) and Deadpool & Wolverine (2024)—set as creator, head writer, and executive producer; he was ultimately credited as co-creator alongside Andrews.

The series returns to the zombie-infested alternate timeline that was introduced in the What If...? episode "What If... Zombies?!" (2021), picking up five years after its ending which saw a zombified Thanos appear with a nearly complete Infinity Gauntlet. Feige and animation head Brad Winderbaum enjoyed that episode so much that they suggested the story be continued, and development began after a positive fan response to the episode. Originally conceived as a film, Andrews called Marvel Zombies' four episodes a "mini-movie event". The change from a film to a miniseries was made in part because the creatives wanted to include Peter Parker / Spider-Man, as Marvel Studios is only able to use the character in short-form animation while Sony Pictures controls the character's other film and television rights. Marvel Studios' Feige, Louis D'Esposito, Winderbaum, and Dana Vasquez-Eberhardt served as executive producers alongside Wells and Andrews, with Danielle Costa and Carrie Wassenaar as producers. During Marvel Studios Animation's panel at the 2022 San Diego Comic-Con, Marvel Zombies and the other projects discussed were introduced as being part of the "Marvel Animated Multiverse". Also at the panel, Marvel Zombies was announced to be the studio's first animated series to be rated TV-MA so it could feature all the "gore and splatter you want from a zombie show".

In September 2025, ahead of the series premiere, Winderbaum said that Marvel Studios had plans for a potential second season, which was dependent on a strong audience response to the first season to get greenlit. He also noted that Marvel Zombies was "caught in the middle" of the studio's creative overhaul in late 2023 and was not planned to have additional seasons. In mid-October, Winderbaum stated that audiences had "showed up in a major way" for the series when asked about the viewership. Andrews explained that the creatives had planned story elements for additional characters in the world who did not appear in the first season, such as Bucky Barnes, which he hoped to feature in a potential second season.

Winderbaum confirmed in January 2026 that active development on a continuation of Marvel Zombies had begun with Andrews but said nothing was officially greenlit. That April, Winderbaum confirmed that a second season was in production and he had seen the first animatic. He also said that the season would deliver not just on zombies, but on an "MCU thing that has never really happened before" that he and the rest of the production team were excited about. In August, Seth Kearsley announced that he was working on the second season. Three, two-episode television specials continuing the story of Marvel Zombies were announced in October 2026. Subtitled The Winter Soldier, The Fist of Khonshu, and The Last Guardian, they will be released around Halloween in 2027, 2028, and 2029, respectively. Winderbaum referred to each special as "seasons". Jennifer Muro announced that she would be producing and serving as head writer on the specials.

=== Writing ===
Wells wrote the series' teleplays, based on stories he conceived with Andrews. Winderbaum called the series "pretty intense" and compared the level of violence to the Marvel Zombies comics. Andrews noted that the TV-MA rating meant they "don't have to pull punches. We can be a little bit more hardcore." He said the series has humor mixed in with the action, violence, drama, and emotion, and added, "It's not just a zombie story, it's a sweeping adventure—one with themes of hope and despair, and that's what you want from a rich zombie story." Profanity is used sparingly in moments where it "fit", and the creators "tr[ied] not to be gratuitous about it", with Andrews explaining that the violence and intense character beats were what led to the TV-MA rating.

The series introduces the original character Blade Knight, a combination of Eric Brooks / Blade and Moon Knight. Originally, the creatives planned for the character to simply be a version of Blade as Marvel Zombies was being developed alongside the planned Blade film by Marvel Studios. However, once the film entered various development delays, the Marvel Zombies team decided to create a new version of the character who was the Fist of Khonshu, freeing them creatively from being tied to plans for the film. T'Challa / Black Panther appears in the series following being featured in the What If...? episode, but does not speak, given Marvel Studios had decided not to recast the role following actor Chadwick Boseman's death in August 2020. Andrews said that had Boseman not died, the series would have made "completely different choices" with the character. Ryan Coogler, who directed the MCU films Black Panther (2018) and Black Panther: Wakanda Forever (2022), provided "some great ideas" for the character's sequence that were "really additive" after being shown an early animatic of it.

=== Casting and voice recording ===
In November 2023, Iman Vellani said she was reprising her MCU role as Kamala Khan / Ms. Marvel in the series; she had already completed her voice work by then. In November 2024, several other actors were revealed to be reprising their MCU roles in the series: Awkwafina as Katy Chen, David Harbour as Alexei Shostakov / Red Guardian, Simu Liu as Xu Shang-Chi, Elizabeth Olsen as Wanda Maximoff / Scarlet Witch / Red Queen / Queen of the Dead, Randall Park as Jimmy Woo, Florence Pugh as Yelena Belova, Hailee Steinfeld as Kate Bishop, and Dominique Thorne as Riri Williams / Ironheart. Todd Williams was also announced as part of the cast. Olsen had recorded her lines in 2020 or 2021. In February 2025, Winderbaum said Hudson Thames—who voiced Peter Parker / Spider-Man in "What If... Zombies?!" and went on to voice the character in the Disney+ animated series Your Friendly Neighborhood Spider-Man (2025–present)—would also be reprising his role in the series.

In July 2025, Feodor Chin said he would be reprising his role as Xu Wenwu from the second season of What If...? (2023). The following month, Paul Rudd, Wyatt Russell, and Tessa Thompson were revealed to be reprising their respective MCU roles as Scott Lang / Ant-Man, John Walker, and Valkyrie, while Todd Williams was revealed to be voicing Blade Knight, replacing Mahershala Ali, who was cast as the character for the MCU films; Ali was unable to reprise his role in the series due to a scheduling issue. In September, several other actors were revealed to be reprising their MCU roles in the series: Kerry Condon as F.R.I.D.A.Y., Adam Hugill as Rintrah, Daniel Swain as the London Master, Sheila Atim as Sara, F. Murray Abraham as Khonshu, and Zenobia Shroff as Muneeba Khan. The same month, Kenna Ramsey and Kari Wahlgren were revealed to be reprising their respective roles as Okoye and Melina Vostokoff from the third season of What If...? (2024). Additionally, actors voicing characters that were portrayed by different actors in previous MCU projects include Rama Vallury as Helmut Zemo and Greg Furman as Thor; Vallury previously voiced a different version of Zemo in the Marvel Studios Animation series X-Men '97 (2024–present).

=== Animation and design ===
The series features the same cel-shaded animation style as What If...?, with character likenesses based on the actors from the films. For example, Blade Knight retains the likeness of Ali despite being voiced by a different actor in the series. The animation is "2.5D", with 3D models rendered with 2D lighting to appear like flat drawings. Animation was provided by Stellar Creative Lab, one of the studios that worked on What If...?. Paul Lasaine served as the production designer, after previously working on What If...?. Many of the animation crew who worked on the series appear as background zombies.

Animatics for the three specials were halfway complete at the time of their announcement, with Winderbaum saying The Winter Soldier's were complete and final animation had begun. Additionally, Winderbaum said the specials would use a narrower, cinematic aspect ratio than the first season, which he believed was the widest of any Marvel Animation and Television series to date.

=== Music ===
Laura Karpman and Nora Kroll-Rosenbaum returned from What If...? as the composers for Marvel Zombies. The soundtrack was released on September 26, 2025.

Marvel Zombies [Original Soundtrack]
No.	Title	Length
1.	"Honor Me"	5:13
2.	"Sorry"	3:00
3.	"Zombies"	1:39
4.	"Up to You"	1:50
5.	"Night Traveler"	1:49
6.	"To the Light"	2:33
7.	"Nothing Left"	1:39
8.	"Ambush"	2:05
9.	"Norse Aggression"	1:37
10.	"Transmitter"	1:31
11.	"Helping Hand"	1:22
12.	"Little Bear"	2:00
13.	"Road Trip"	2:54
14.	"We Survive"	1:38
15.	"Almost There"	1:57
16.	"Fall Out"	1:45
17.	"Leave Them"	1:36
18.	"Epic"	2:27
19.	"Zombie Food"	1:29
20.	"Defend"	1:47
21.	"Inside Out"	1:12
22.	"Everyone Who Suffered"	2:14
23.	"Alone"	1:31
24.	"Take the Stage"	2:22
Total length:		1:12:00

== Marketing ==
The series was discussed during Marvel Studios Animation's panel at the 2022 San Diego Comic-Con, when artwork of the characters was revealed. Andrews and Winderbaum promoted the series during Marvel Studios Animation's panel at the D23 convention in August 2024, where footage was shown. Both Germain Lussier of Gizmodo and Ray Flook of Bleeding Cool compared the footage to the Mad Max franchise. More footage from the series was included in a video that was released by Disney+ in October, announcing the release schedule for Marvel Television and Marvel Animation projects through the end of 2025. More footage was included in a sizzle reel that was shown at Disney's upfront presentation in May 2025.

The official trailer was released on September 2, 2025, featuring the song "From Me to U" by Babymetal and Poppy. According to The Hollywood Reporter, the trailer was the second-biggest launch for a Marvel Studios Animation series after X-Men '97 (2024–present), with Blade Knight the most-talked about character on social media. Priya Prakash of Indiatimes highlighted some scenes from the trailer—such as Spider-Man using his webs to decapitate a horde of zombies, and Blade Knight slicing a zombie Ghost with his sword—and stated that they show "how far Marvel is willing to push the envelope" with the series.

== Release ==
Marvel Zombies was released on Disney+ on September 24, 2025, and consists of four episodes. It was previously scheduled to premiere on October 3. In July 2022, the series had been expected to debut in 2024. In January 2024, Andrews said he was unsure when the series would be released, revealing that the release date had been continually shifting, and the series was undated at that time. Marvel Studios Animation's panel at D23 in August 2024 covered series, including Marvel Zombies, that were intended for release over the following 12 to 18 months, though it was specifically stated that Marvel Zombies would not be released "for a while". Its October 2025 release month was announced in October 2024, and was moved up to its September release date in August 2025. Andrews stated that Marvel Zombies was ready to release by late 2024 around Halloween, but another Marvel Studios miniseries, Agatha All Along, was already scheduled for release at that time, so Marvel Zombies was delayed to 2025 to prevent the ratings of both series from negatively impacting each other. The series is part of Phase Six of the MCU.

The specials The Winter Soldier, The Fist of Khonshu, and The Last Guardian, will be released around Halloween in 2027, 2028, and 2029, respectively. The Winter Soldier will be part of Phase Six, while The Fist of Khonshu and The Last Guardian will be part of Phase Seven.

== Reception ==
=== Viewership ===
Streaming analytics firm FlixPatrol, which monitors daily updated VOD charts and streaming ratings across the globe, reported that Marvel Zombies was the most-streamed series on Disney+ in more than 30 countries following its release, ranking above Grey's Anatomy (2005–present), High Potential (2024–present), and Alien: Earth (2025–present). In the United States, the series topped Disney+'s most-watched list during its first three days, becoming one of Marvel Studios Animation's best openings to date. TVision, which tracks viewer attention, program reach, and engagement across more than 1,000 CTV apps, announced that Marvel Zombies was the third-most streamed show in the U.S. between September 22–28. On September 29, the series ranked No. 2 overall on Disney+ in the United States, behind Elio (2025). On October 6, Marvel Zombies was the most-streamed series on the platform globally, according to FlixPatrol.

=== Critical response ===
The review aggregator website Rotten Tomatoes reports a 66% approval rating based on 35 reviews. The website's critics consensus reads, "Diverting enough to satisfy MCU fans, and wickedly cruel enough to entice horror aficionados, Marvel Zombies' sheer entertainment makes up for what it lacks in originality." Metacritic, which uses a weighted average, assigned a score of 66 out of 100 based on 10 critics, indicating "generally favorable".

=== Accolades ===
Accolades received by Marvel Zombies
Award	Date of ceremony	Category	Recipient(s)	Result	Ref.
Annie Awards	February 21, 2026	Best Limited Series	Marvel Zombies (for Episode 2)	Nominated	
Annie Awards	February 21, 2026	Outstanding Achievement for Animated Effects in an Animated Television/Broadcast Production	Emma Badia, Tristan Fairclough, Jimmy Dumont, Sheng Hung, and Arth Vasavada (for Episode 4)	Nominated	
Critics' Choice Television Awards	January 4, 2026	Best Animated Series	Marvel Zombies	Nominated	
Saturn Awards	March 8, 2026	Best Animated Television Series or Special	Marvel Zombies	Nominated	
