= List of Marvel Cinematic Universe television series (Marvel Studios) =

Marvel Cinematic Universe television series (Marvel Studios)
- Marvel Television (top) and Marvel Animation (bottom) label logos introduced in 2024
- Genre: Superhero
- Based on: Characters published by Marvel Comics
- Starring: Series actors
- Country of origin: United States
- Original language: English
- No. of seasons: 22 (across 18 series)
- No. of episodes: 156

Production
- Executive producers: Kevin Feige; Louis D'Esposito; Victoria Alonso; Brad Winderbaum
- Production company: Marvel Studios

Original release
- Network: Disney+; Hulu
- Release: January 15, 2021 – present

Related
- Marvel's Special Presentations

Marvel Cinematic Universe Phases
- The Infinity Saga; Phase One (2008–2012); Phase Two (2013–2015); Phase Three (2016–2019)
- The Multiverse Saga; Phase Four (2021–2022); Phase Five (2023–2025); Phase Six (2025–2027)

The Marvel Cinematic Universe (MCU) television series are American superhero television shows produced by Marvel Studios, based on characters that appear in publications by Marvel Comics. The series are set in the shared universe of the MCU film franchise and are released in the franchise's phases alongside the films.

The MCU first expanded to television after Marvel Television was formed in 2010, with that studio producing numerous series. Marvel Television was shut down in December 2019 after Marvel Studios, the production studio behind the films, began developing its own series for the streaming service Disney+. Marvel Studios initially made its Disney+ series following a similar approach to its films, hiring head writers to develop the series and directors to lead them during production. The early shows are mostly miniseries that focus on supporting characters from the films or introduce new characters that later appear in films. Animated series are produced under the Marvel Studios Animation division.

Marvel Studios changed its television approach in 2022 and 2023, producing less content at the directive of parent company Disney, hiring traditional showrunners, and moving toward more multi-season series. In 2024, the studio began releasing series under the labels "Marvel Television", not to be confused with the earlier company, and "Marvel Animation". Some series use the "Marvel Spotlight" branding, which focuses on character-driven stories with less impact on the larger MCU narrative. Marvel Studios president Kevin Feige is an executive producer on every series, and Marvel Studios television and animation head Brad Winderbaum is an executive producer on most of them.

The first Marvel Studios series was WandaVision (2021) which is part of their Phase Four slate along with The Falcon and the Winter Soldier (2021), the first season of Loki (2021), the first season of the animated What If...? (2021), Hawkeye (2021), Moon Knight (2022), Ms. Marvel (2022), and She-Hulk: Attorney at Law (2022). Phase Five includes Secret Invasion (2023), the second season of Loki (2023), the second and third seasons of What If...? (2023–24), Echo (2024), Agatha All Along (2024), the first season of the animated Your Friendly Neighborhood Spider-Man (2025), the first season of Daredevil: Born Again (2025), and Ironheart (2025). Phase Six features the animated Eyes of Wakanda (2025) and the first season of Marvel Zombies and its continuation special Marvel Zombies: The Winter Soldier (2025–27), Wonder Man (2026), the second and third seasons of Daredevil: Born Again (2026–27), VisionQuest (2026), and the second season of Your Friendly Neighborhood Spider-Man (2027). Phase Seven features the animated third and fourth seasons of Your Friendly Neighborhood Spider-Man and the specials Marvel Zombies: The Fist of Khonshu and Marvel Zombies: The Last Guardian (all 2028–29), and Zodiac (2028).

Additionally, several television specials have been released under the "Special Presentation" banners; the animated shorts series I Am Groot (2022–2023) was released across Phases Four and Five; and the animated series X-Men '97 (2024–present) is being released as part of the MCU's Multiverse Saga storyline.

== Development ==
=== Initial development work ===
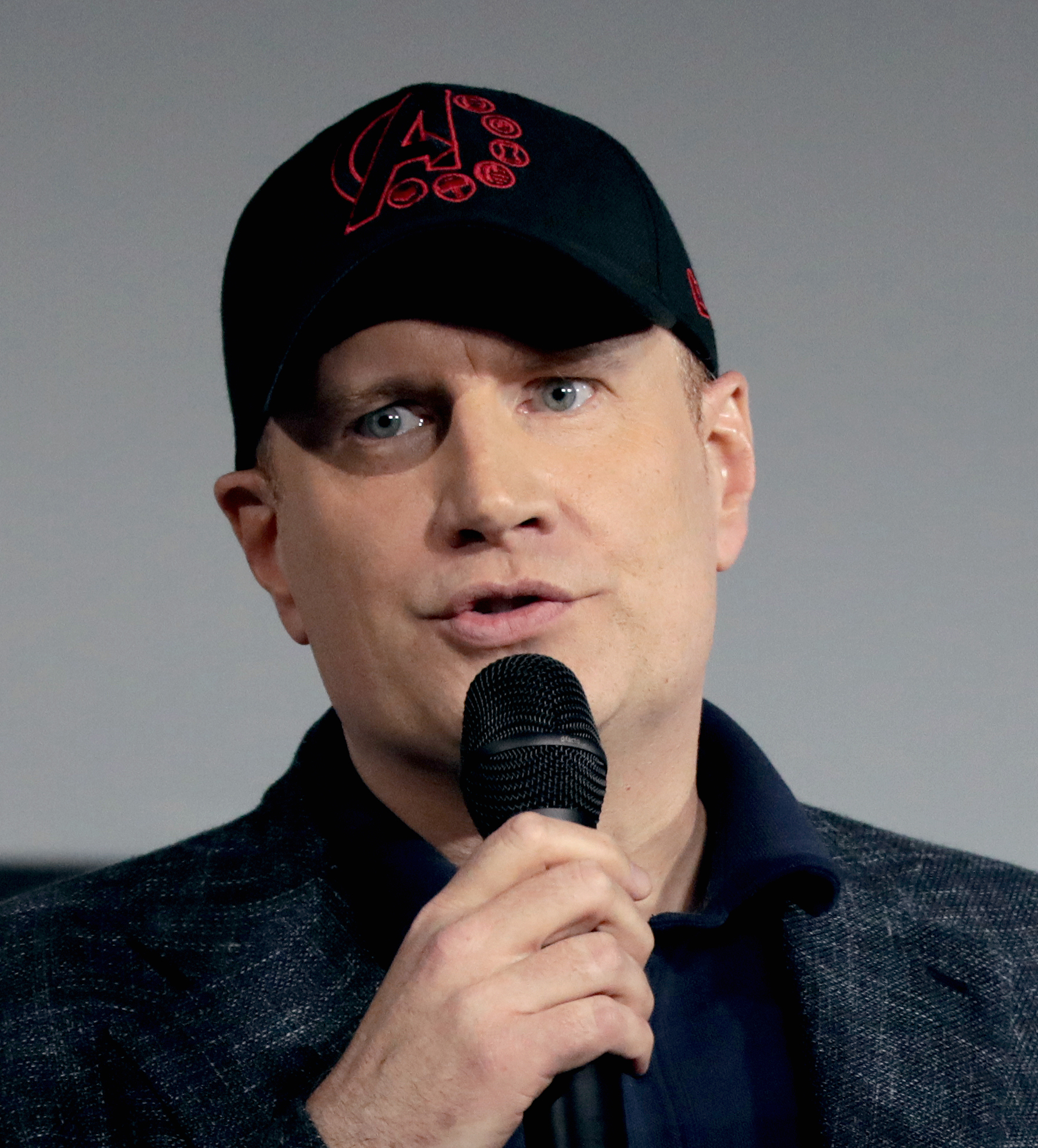
Marvel Studios president Kevin Feige is an executive producer on all of the studio's MCU television series

Marvel Television was launched in June 2010 and began making television series set in the Marvel Cinematic Universe (MCU). By September 2018, Marvel Studios was developing its own series for parent company Disney's streaming service, Disney+, to be centered on supporting characters from the MCU films who had not starred in their own films. The actors who portrayed the characters in the films were expected to reprise their roles for the series. Marvel Studios president Kevin Feige was taking a "hands-on role" in each series' development, focusing on "continuity of story" with the films and "handling" the returning actors. The Guardians of the Galaxy Holiday Special (2022), a television special, was the first project Marvel Studios began planning for Disney+. In March 2019, Feige said the Marvel Studios series would take characters from the films, change them, and see those changes reflected in future films. New characters introduced in the series could also go on to appear in films. Disney gave Marvel Studios an initial mandate to create as much content as it could, as quickly as it could, to bolster the new streaming service.

Feige announced the franchise's Phase Four slate at San Diego Comic-Con in July 2019, consisting of films and Disney+ event series. In September, Variety reported that Marvel Television was likely being phased out in favor of the new Marvel Studios series. Feige was named the chief creative officer of Marvel Entertainment a month later and Marvel Television moved under Marvel Studios. In December, Feige stated that Marvel Studios' series were "a new type of cinematic" story and "for the first time... the MCU will be on your TV screen at home on Disney+ and interconnect with the movies and go back and forth". The next day, Marvel Television announced that it would shut down. In January 2020, ABC Entertainment president Karey Burke said talks were beginning with Feige and Marvel Studios about what a Marvel Studios series on ABC could be, but she said Marvel's focus at that time was on the Disney+ series. Series for Marvel Studios' Phase Five slate were confirmed at San Diego Comic-Con in July 2022, where Feige announced that Phases Four, Five, and Six would make up "The Multiverse Saga".

After beginning work on their first animated series, What If...? (2021–2024), Marvel Studios was revealed in July 2021 to be creating an animation division, named Marvel Studios Animation, to focus on a slate of Disney+ animated series. Also in 2021, the studio formed several production partnerships to develop new series for Disney+: in February, Black Panther (2018) and Black Panther: Wakanda Forever (2022) director Ryan Coogler's production company Proximity Media was set to work with the studio as part of a deal with Walt Disney Television; that May, WandaVision (2021) head writer Jac Schaeffer signed a three-year deal with Marvel Studios and 20th Television; and in December, Shang-Chi and the Legend of the Ten Rings (2021) director Destin Daniel Cretton signed a multi-year television deal with Marvel Studios.

=== Initial approach to television ===
Feige described Marvel Studios' approach to television in January 2021, explaining that streaming on Disney+ gave the studio flexibility with the formats for each series. He said some were developed as one-off miniseries that were intended to lead into feature films, though additional seasons could be added to these in the future. Other series were always intended to cover multiple seasons, in addition to connecting to the films, such as Loki (2021–2023). These could have several years between the release of seasons, similar to series like Game of Thrones (2011–2019) and Stranger Things (2016–2025). Feige said each miniseries or season was intended to be around six hours of content, but this would be split in different ways depending on the story, for example six one-hour-long episodes or nine half-hour episodes. Marvel Studios intended for each series to be an event. They were reported to have budgets of $100–150 million each, though some were as high as $200 million. The high costs were primarily attributed to actors' pay and visual effects. The deal structure used for actors to appear in these series and then continue on in films was one of the reasons many of Marvel's initial series did not receive a second season, because it would have made additional seasons too expensive to produce. Marvel Studios worked towards pre-established release dates, intending to release them on those dates no matter the state the series were in.

Brad Winderbaum, head of television and animation at Marvel Studios, said the series were produced in "waves", with many of the early series approached with a feature film structure that gave the characters one arc across a single, serialized story. These were followed by series such as Moon Knight (2022) that were intended to establish characters that would tie in with the MCU's forthcoming plans. The earliest series were directed by a single person, but later series have multiple directors taking on different numbers of episodes. Feige said this happened due to a combination of logistics, the needs of each story, and the studio learning more about making long-form television. The studio also began experimenting with more episodic storytelling after the first few series, such as their initial plans for Daredevil: Born Again (2025–present), with Feige excited to try to replicate the network television procedural series model on Disney+.

Marvel Studios initially used the term "head writer" instead of the traditional showrunner title. They encouraged directors to join their series' writers' rooms and take part in the creative process, as is done with their feature films, working alongside Feige and the Marvel Studios executives assigned to each series. Many of the junior executives had been production managers on MCU films and were able to act as production leads and liaisons between the head writers, Feige, and executives in the "Marvel Studios Parliament"; Feige retained final approval for major creative issues. The studio's approach was confirmed by Schaeffer, The Falcon and the Winter Soldier (2021) director Kari Skogland, and Loki season one director Kate Herron. Skogland described it as "effective and efficient", feeling that the series were too much for a single showrunner to take on. Each series had multiple writers working in a writers' room under the head writer, and they also used "created for television by" credits for the head writers. Explaining the decision-making process and hierarchy for Marvel Studios' first three series, Loki season one head writer Michael Waldron said the head writer of each series would have final say on creative decisions before filming began. At that point, the series shifted to a "more feature centric model" where the director took on the role that a traditional showrunner might have and had the final say on creative decisions while on set and in post-production. The head writer was still present on set and during post-production for any necessary rewrites. Additional examples of directors taking more creative control on series from writers included Mohamed Diab with Moon Knight (2022) after head writer Jeremy Slater quit; and Kat Coiro with She-Hulk: Attorney at Law (2022), though head writer Jessica Gao was brought back to oversee that series' post-production, "the rare Marvel head writer" to do so. Marvel Studios relied on their executives to shepherd each series and, as with their films, heavily relied on reshoots during post-production to fix any issues. The series were described as being filmed "on the fly"; an example of this was Secret Invasion (2023), which underwent extensive reshoots after several crew members, including head writer Kyle Bradstreet and the series' production and development executive Chris Gary, were replaced during production.

=== Overhaul of television operations ===
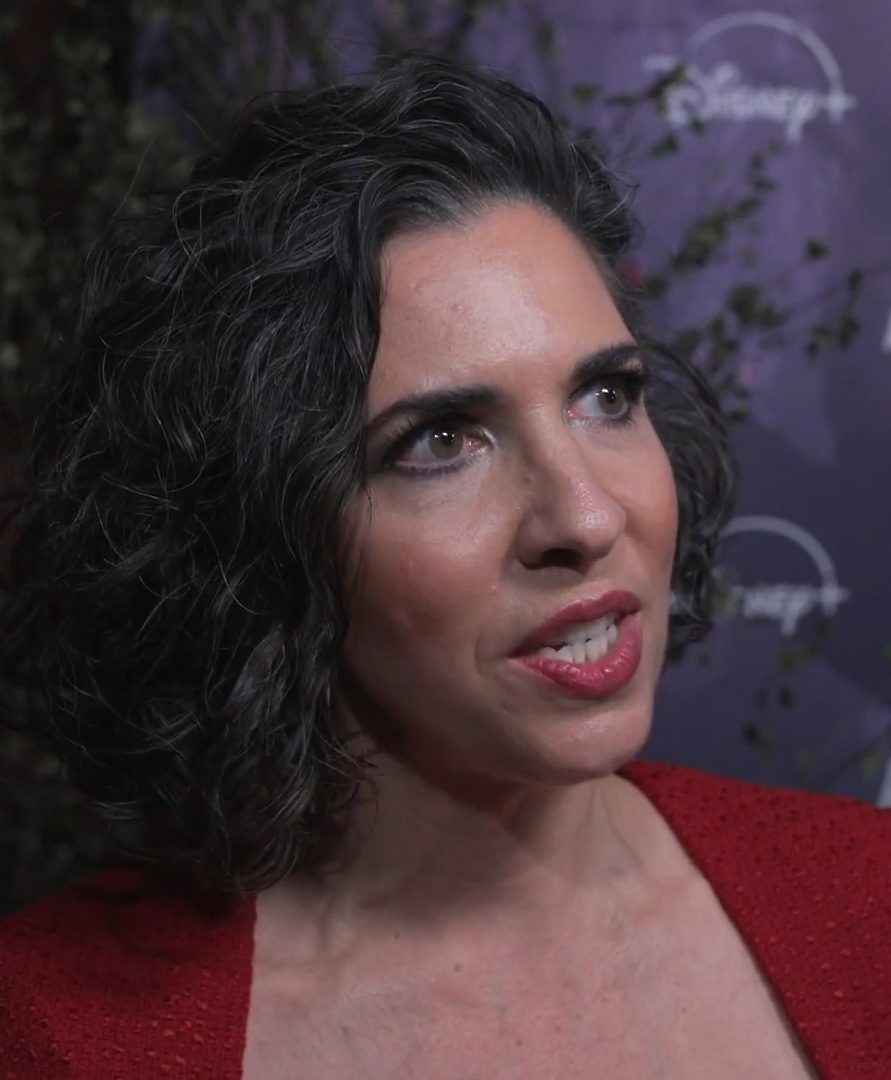
WandaVision head writer Jac Schaeffer was the first person to be credited as a showrunner on a Marvel Studios series, receiving that title for the spin-off series Agatha All Along

Marvel Studios changed its approach to developing series in 2022, moving to a more traditional model of putting multiple series into development that would not necessarily all be produced. This was part of wider changes to the studio's television approach that were revealed in October 2023: moving away from the head writer model in favor of showrunners; hiring dedicated executives to focus on television; and planning more multi-season series so audiences could form relationships with characters over time, rather than series just being one-off events. The studio came around to the idea of hiring showrunners after Gao returned to aid She-Hulk in post-production, and after the critical and commercial failure of Secret Invasion. Winderbaum said the studio was trying to "marry the Marvel culture with the traditional television culture", and he felt this would separate their streaming content from their theatrical films. Moving forward, showrunners would write television pilots and series bibles to have a creative throughline for the entire production process, and series would not receive an official greenlight until the studio was confident in its pilot and bible. Despite the shift to a more traditional development model, Winderbaum said Marvel Studios would not shoot pilot episodes before a full series received a greenlight. He said they might shoot the first episode of a series ahead of the rest of principal photography to allow a "pivot" if any creative changes were deemed necessary.

In 2024, Marvel Studios introduced new labels under which its shows would be released, to indicate to audiences that they did not have to watch all of the studio's projects to understand the overall MCU story and could choose which storylines and characters under those labels to follow. Winderbaum explained that the studio's priorities had shifted to a new wave of multi-season series designed to be released annually, "more like television", with their own ongoing stories and fewer plans to cross over with the films. He wanted to have an annual "seasonal cadence" that audiences could rely on, something that streaming services in general had struggled to do. Although the focus was to create more stand-alone content, Winderbaum said there would still be some connections to the larger MCU because "if it's not connected, it's severing what makes the MCU the MCU". Marvel Studios' series moving forward would be less focused on giving leading roles to characters from the films, as their initial series were, though those types of characters could still appear in supporting roles. Feige reiterated in July 2025 that they planned for future series to have less overlap with the films, comparing this to the Marvel Television series on ABC and Netflix. He said the studio was returning to the notion of "allowing a TV show to be a TV show".

Jac Schaeffer was initially hired as the head writer of WandaVision spin-off Agatha All Along (2024) but was ultimately credited as showrunner, making her the first person to receive that title on a Marvel Studios series. Agatha All Along was also the least expensive series from Marvel Studios to date, with a budget of less than $40 million. Winderbaum said this more "responsible" budgeting approach would be used for Born Again and other series planned for the next few years. He later stated that Wonder Man (2026) was "one of the lowest, if not the lowest" budgeted Marvel Studios television series so far.

=== New development work ===
In February 2023, Disney CEO Bob Iger said the company was re-evaluating the volume of content it output as a way to cut costs over the next few years. Reflecting on the large amount of Disney+ content released for the MCU's Phase Four, Feige said Marvel Studios would space out the releases of Phase Five and Six series so each could "get a chance to shine". Iger reiterated this in May 2024, saying Disney planned to release two Marvel series a year moving forward, down from around four series a year, as part of the company's larger strategy to reduce content output and focus on quality. Acknowledging that there were more Marvel series than that on the upcoming release schedule, he said some of these were a "vestige" of Disney's previous desire to increase Marvel's output. For example, Disney+ announced that six Marvel series would be released in 2025. Feige explained that many of these had been in development for a long time and were ready to be released, with some already being delayed due to Disney's request to reduce output. Feige disliked having to hold series for release that had been completed, such as Ironheart (2025) and Wonder Man, and hoped to avoid doing this again in the future. He expected the studio to begin releasing three series per year after 2025. The plan by May 2025 was to release two live-action and two animated projects a year, although Feige stated in July that he anticipated they would just make one live-action series a year moving forward.

VisionQuest, which was announced in May 2024, was the studio's first live-action series pickup in nearly two years and the first to move forward under the studio's new development approach. By February 2025, the studio was exploring giving second seasons to miniseries such as Agatha All Along and Hawkeye (2021). Winderbaum said some series released after the creative overhaul, such as Marvel Zombies (2025) and Wonder Man, had been caught in the middle of their changes and were not originally planned to have additional seasons. He said Marvel Television would be open to making more of those series if there was a strong audience response to them. By May 2025, Winderbaum had extended his contract with Marvel Studios to continue overseeing its television output, with Feige returning his focus to the studio's films. A second season of Wonder Man was announced in March 2026, while a second season for Marvel Zombies was confirmed the following month. However, the second season of Wonder Man was canceled in July.

Following the cancellation of Wonder Man, several reports discussed the future of Marvel Television's live-action content. Journalist Jeff Sneider and Collider's Adam Blevins both reported that Marvel Television was looking to reduce its live-action series output following the release of VisionQuest later in 2026, with Blevins adding that there was potential for some miniseries to be developed in the future under the Marvel Spotlight label or as Special Presentations. Julia Alexander of Puck reported that multiple new live-action series were being developed that were planned to be announced "soon", noting Marvel Television's slow down was part of a larger industry regression from superhero content on streaming services who believed the series did not reach a wide enough audience for its cost, despite positive reviews or accolades. Blevins also said Wonder Man was one of several canceled Disney series that they reportedly created as an "experiment" to try to compete with other streaming services. He added that Disney was reducing live-action series output across all its subsidies in favor of animated series that could be "fast-tracked on a much smaller budget". In October 2026, the series Zodiac was green-lit and announced by Marvel Television; this occurred following the report that Daredevil: Born Again would conclude with its third season.

== Labels and banners ==
In June 2021, Marvel Studios executive Victoria Alonso said the studio's expansion to animation was an opportunity to make the MCU more diverse and allowed Marvel Studios to work with new companies around the world. Marvel Studios Animation built infrastructure to handle a slate of series and looked to hire around 300 new staff for production roles. What If...? director Bryan Andrews said each animated series would exist on its own terms and explore different elements of the MCU. Winderbaum said the division would only tell stories that they felt needed to be told in animated form, and Marvel Studios was open to working with corporate siblings Pixar Animation and Walt Disney Animation under the right circumstances. During Marvel Studios Animation's panel at the 2022 San Diego Comic-Con, the slate of animated series were described as the "Marvel Animated Multiverse". Winderbaum said the MCU's exploration of the multiverse allowed the studio to look at alternate versions of MCU characters, and that concept had become their "guiding light" for animated projects. This includes X-Men '97 (2024–present), a revival and continuation of the series X-Men: The Animated Series (1992–1997), which Winderbaum said could connect to the MCU through the multiverse; it is part of the Multiverse Saga. He later stated that the success of X-Men '97's first season had opened up new development opportunities for the studio's animation slate, including the possibility of making an animated film.

Marvel Spotlight logo

The studio announced the "Marvel Spotlight" banner in November 2023 for select series that focus on more grounded, character-driven stories with less impact on the larger MCU narrative. Winderbaum said the banner was created during post-production on Echo (2024) to indicate to audiences that they did not need to watch any other MCU projects to understand the series. The banner was inspired by the Marvel Spotlight anthology comics (1971–1981) and features a new opening logo with a musical fanfare composed by Michael Giacchino. This was in addition to the "Marvel Studios Special Presentations" banner which was created for the studio's television specials starting with The Guardians of the Galaxy Holiday Special; the banner was renamed "Marvel Television Special Presentations" with the release of The Punisher: One Last Kill.

When X-Men '97 debuted in March 2024, it did so under a new "Marvel Animation" label separate from the existing Marvel Animation subsidiary. That May, Marvel Studios revealed that its live-action Disney+ series would be released under a new "Marvel Television" label, separate from the previous company of the same name, starting with Agatha All Along later that year. Winderbaum explained that Marvel Studios was now using the "Marvel Television" and "Marvel Animation" labels to indicate to audiences that they did not have to watch all of the studio's projects. The studio also planned to maintain the "Marvel Spotlight" banner in conjunction with the Marvel Television label for select series.

== Television series ==
All Marvel Studios series are being released on Disney+ unless otherwise noted. They exist alongside the films of their respective phase.

=== The Multiverse Saga ===
==== Phase Four ====
Two Marvel Studios Special Presentation television specials, Werewolf by Night and The Guardians of the Galaxy Holiday Special (both 2022), are also included in Phase Four.

Television series of Phase Four
Series	Season	Episodes	Originally released		Production division	Head writer	Lead director(s)
Series	Season	Episodes	First released	Last released	Production division	Head writer	Lead director(s)
WandaVision	1	9	January 15, 2021	March 5, 2021	—N/a	Jac Schaeffer	Matt Shakman
The Falcon and the Winter Soldier	1	6	March 19, 2021	April 23, 2021	—N/a	Malcolm Spellman	Kari Skogland
Loki	1	6	June 9, 2021	July 14, 2021	—N/a	Michael Waldron	Kate Herron
What If...?	1	9	August 11, 2021	October 6, 2021	Marvel Studios Animation	A. C. Bradley	Bryan Andrews
Hawkeye	1	6	November 24, 2021	December 22, 2021	—N/a	Jonathan Igla	Rhys Thomas
Moon Knight	1	6	March 30, 2022	May 4, 2022	—N/a	Jeremy Slater	Mohamed Diab
Ms. Marvel	1	6	June 8, 2022	July 13, 2022	—N/a	Bisha K. Ali	Adil & Bilall
She-Hulk: Attorney at Law	1	9	August 18, 2022	October 13, 2022	—N/a	Jessica Gao	Kat Coiro

==== Phase Five ====
Television series of Phase Five
Series	Season	Episodes	Originally released		Production division / label (Note: Marvel Studios introduced several new labels and banners under which its series are released, starting in 2024.)	Head writer(s) / showrunner (Note: By October 2023, Marvel Studios shifted their creative philosophy to a more traditional television development process, moving away from head writers and beginning to hire dedicated showrunners for their series. The showrunner title applies to Jac Schaeffer on Agatha All Along and Dario Scardapane on Daredevil: Born Again, while Jeff Trammell served as both the head writer and showrunner of Your Friendly Neighborhood Spider-Man.)	Lead director(s)
Series	Season	Episodes	First released	Last released	Production division / label	Head writer(s) / showrunner	Lead director(s)
Secret Invasion	1	6	June 21, 2023	July 26, 2023	—N/a	Kyle Bradstreet (Note: During production of Secret Invasion, Bradstreet was replaced as writer by Brian Tucker, who received the majority of the writing credits on the series.)	Ali Selim
Loki	2	6	October 5, 2023	November 9, 2023	—N/a	Eric Martin	Justin Benson & Aaron Moorhead
What If...?	2	9	December 22, 2023	December 30, 2023	Marvel Studios Animation	A.C. Bradley	Bryan Andrews
What If...?	3	8	December 22, 2024	December 29, 2024	Marvel Animation	Matthew Chauncey	Stephan Franck and Bryan Andrews
Echo	1	5	January 9, 2024 (Note: Echo was released simultaneously on Disney+ and Hulu and was available on Hulu until April 9, 2024.)		Marvel Spotlight	Marion Dayre and Amy Rardin	Sydney Freeland
Agatha All Along	1	9	September 18, 2024	October 30, 2024	Marvel Television	Jac Schaeffer	Jac Schaeffer
Your Friendly Neighborhood Spider-Man	1	10	January 29, 2025	February 19, 2025	Marvel Animation	Jeff Trammell	Mel Zwyer
Daredevil: Born Again	1	9	March 4, 2025	April 15, 2025	Marvel Television	Dario Scardapane	Justin Benson & Aaron Moorhead
Ironheart	1	6	June 24, 2025	July 1, 2025	Marvel Television	Chinaka Hodge	Sam Bailey and Angela Barnes

==== Phase Six ====
A Marvel Television Special Presentation, The Punisher: One Last Kill (2026), is also included in Phase Six.

Television series of Phase Six
Series	Season	Episodes	Originally released		Production label(s)	Showrunner (Note: Zeb Wells served as the head writer for Marvel Zombies, while Jennifer Muro served as head writer on the Marvel Zombies continuation special, The Winter Soldier. Jeff Trammell served as both the head writer and showrunner of Your Friendly Neighborhood Spider-Man.)	Lead director(s)	Status
Series	Season	Episodes	First released	Last released	Production label(s)	Showrunner	Lead director(s)	Status
Eyes of Wakanda	1	4	August 1, 2025		Marvel Animation	Todd Harris	Todd Harris and John Fang	Released
Marvel Zombies	1	4	September 24, 2025		Marvel Animation	Bryan Andrews	Bryan Andrews	Released
Marvel Zombies	The Winter Soldier	2	October 2027		Marvel Animation	Bryan Andrews	Bryan Andrews	In production
Wonder Man	1	8	January 27, 2026		Marvel Television; Marvel Spotlight	Andrew Guest	Destin Daniel Cretton	Released
Daredevil: Born Again	2	8	March 24, 2026	May 5, 2026	Marvel Television	Dario Scardapane	Justin Benson & Aaron Moorhead	Released
Daredevil: Born Again	3	8	March 2027	TBA	Marvel Television	Dario Scardapane	Justin Benson & Aaron Moorhead	Post-production
VisionQuest	1	8	October 13, 2026	November 10, 2026	Marvel Television	Terry Matalas	Terry Matalas	Streaming
Your Friendly Neighborhood Spider-Man	2	TBA	January 13, 2027	TBA	Marvel Animation	Jeff Trammell	TBA	In production

=== Phase Seven ===
Television series of Phase Seven
Series	Season	Episodes	Originally released		Production label	Showrunner (Note: Jennifer Muro served as the head writer for the Marvel Zombies specials The Fist of Khonshu and The Last Guardian, while Jeff Trammell served as both the head writer and showrunner of Your Friendly Neighborhood Spider-Man.)	Lead director	Status
Series	Season	Episodes	First released	Last released	Production label	Showrunner	Lead director	Status
Your Friendly Neighborhood Spider-Man	3	TBA	2028	TBA	Marvel Animation	Jeff Trammell	TBA	In production
Your Friendly Neighborhood Spider-Man	4	TBA	2029	TBA	Marvel Animation	Jeff Trammell	TBA	In production
Marvel Zombies	The Fist of Khonshu	2	October 2028		Marvel Animation	Bryan Andrews	Bryan Andrews	In production
Marvel Zombies	The Last Guardian	2	October 2029		Marvel Animation	Bryan Andrews	Bryan Andrews	In production
Zodiac	1	TBA	2028	TBA	Marvel Television	TBA	TBA	Pre-production

==== Your Friendly Neighborhood Spider-Man seasons 3 and 4 ====
A third season of Your Friendly Neighborhood Spider-Man is in development, with Jeff Trammell returning as head writer and showrunner, while Trammell confirmed work had begun on a fourth season in October 2026. Winderbaum said in October 2025 that future seasons would be released annually "for a number of years", with season two releasing in January 2027.

==== Marvel Zombies: The Fist of Khonshu and The Last Guardian ====
In January 2026, active development on a continuation of Marvel Zombies had begun with director Bryan Andrews, and had entered production by April 2026. That October, the two-episode specials, The Fist of Khonshu, and The Last Guardian, were announced, with Jennifer Muro producing and serving as head writer on the specials. The Fist of Khonshu and The Last Guardian will be released in October 2028 and October 2029, respectively. They follow the special The Winter Soldier that will be released in October 2027.

==== Zodiac ====
Two spies chase targets with special abilities.

In September 2026, Marvel Television was reported to have greenlit a spy thriller series that was being referred to as Zodiac, which was formally announced the following month. Shortly after, Amit Cohen and Ron Leshem were revealed as the series' writers. Filming is expected to begin in early 2027 in London. Zodiac will be released in 2028.

=== Future ===
At any given time, Marvel Studios has series planned five-to-six years out from what they have announced, with Marvel Television generally having three to five live-action series in development. In July 2025, Feige said they had a seven-year plan through 2032 with potential projects on magnets that could be moved around. Marvel Studios was looking to release one live-action series a year at that point.

By November 2022, Coogler's Proximity Media was developing several series set in Wakanda. Giancarlo Esposito indicated in May 2024 that he would be featured in an MCU series after being introduced as Seth Voelker / Sidewinder in Captain America: Brave New World (2025), and director Julius Onah said Esposito's role in the film was set up for further appearances of Sidewinder's Serpent Society.

== Release schedule ==
WandaVision and The Falcon and the Winter Soldier were released on Fridays. The majority of Marvel Studios' series since the first season of Loki have been released on Wednesdays, although She-Hulk was released on Thursdays. The second season of Loki (2023) and Echo were released in prime time in the United States, the former on Thursday evenings and the latter on a Tuesday evening. Most of Marvel Studios' series are released weekly. The second season of What If...? (2023) was the first to be released daily, while Echo was the first to be released all at once in a binge release. Echo was also released simultaneously on Hulu, where it was available for a limited time, and was the first Marvel Studios series to be rated TV-MA. The first season of Your Friendly Neighborhood Spider-Man (2025) was released weekly in groups of two or three episodes, which Chris Agar of ComicBook.com called unusual for an MCU series. He believed this was done to prevent the season's release from overlapping with the first season of Born Again (2025). After the announcement of a binge release for Wonder Man, journalist Alex Zalben described Marvel's inconsistent series release strategy as "all over the place". He noted that Echo and Wonder Man, the first two series under the Marvel Spotlight banner, were both "unceremoniously dumped" as binge releases in January and therefore felt the banner could indicate that Marvel Studios is not confident in a series. VisionQuest (2026) released its first six episodes weekly in two-episode blocks, followed by the final two episodes releasing individually a week apart. Total Film's Bradley Russell felt this was unusual and not as "straightforward", but described it as providing a "super-sized serving" to encourage weekly discussions of fan theories, similar to those for WandaVision and Agatha All Along. Showrunner Terry Matalas explained that the block episodes were released as such to provide more content each week, and described the final two episodes as "their own kind of movies".

== Reception ==
=== Critical response ===
Critical response of Phase Four television series
Title	Season	Rotten Tomatoes	Metacritic
WandaVision	–	92% (428 reviews)	77 (43 reviews)
The Falcon and the Winter Soldier	–	85% (336 reviews)	74 (32 reviews)
Loki	1	92% (340 reviews)	74 (32 reviews)
What If...?	1	89% (123 reviews)	69 (16 reviews)
Hawkeye	–	92% (176 reviews)	66 (27 reviews)
Moon Knight	–	86% (250 reviews)	69 (27 reviews)
Ms. Marvel	–	98% (311 reviews)	78 (23 reviews)
She-Hulk: Attorney at Law	–	80% (611 reviews)	67 (26 reviews)

Critical response of Phase Five television series
Title	Season	Rotten Tomatoes	Metacritic
Secret Invasion	–	53% (204 reviews)	63 (24 reviews)
Loki	2	82% (178 reviews)	65 (23 reviews)
What If...?	2	88% (32 reviews)	79 (7 reviews)
What If...?	3	80% (30 reviews)	—N/a
Echo	–	71% (89 reviews)	62 (24 reviews)
Agatha All Along	–	84% (218 reviews)	66 (32 reviews)
Your Friendly Neighborhood Spider-Man	1	97% (38 reviews)	76 (11 reviews)
Daredevil: Born Again	1	87% (224 reviews)	69 (33 reviews)
Ironheart	–	76% (131 reviews)	57 (25 reviews)

Critical response of Phase Six television series
Title	Season	Rotten Tomatoes	Metacritic
Eyes of Wakanda	–	92% (39 reviews)	71 (11 reviews)
Marvel Zombies	1	66% (35 reviews)	66 (10 reviews)
Wonder Man	–	91% (114 reviews)	75 (31 reviews)
Daredevil: Born Again	2	87% (135 reviews)	73 (16 reviews)
VisionQuest	–	85% (95 reviews)	64 (25 reviews)

=== Analysis ===
Discussing the studio's October 2023 philosophy change for The A.V. Club, Sam Barsanti said it was good that Marvel recognized the issues with "turn[ing] its Disney+ shows into stretched-out movies". However, Barsanti believed WandaVision and She-Hulk did not have the same problems and therefore felt it was possible to make more traditional television under the previous approach. /Film's Ben Pearson called the previous approach "seriously flawed" and said "tried-and-true methodologies work for a reason"; Pearson was hopeful that other Hollywood studios would not try to replicate Marvel's initial approach.

Alex Zalben, writing for Total Film, championed the Marvel Spotlight format following the successful release of Wonder Man, the second series to use the Spotlight label after Echo, believing all Marvel Studios series should use it. He argued the Spotlight label allowed Marvel Studios the ability to better explore "characters, themes, and emotions" in their series without the need to constantly set up the next project or storyline in the larger MCU, something that had become an "obsessive mentality" for the franchise, nor having them deal with "world-ending stakes" of most MCU projects. Zalben likened the Spotlight approach to how Marvel Studios created their Phase One films, and believed returning to this approach was the "path forward" for the MCU. Collider's Carolyn Jenkins was also a fan of the Spotlight format, enjoying the character-first nature of them and how they focused less on the larger MCU narratives. As with Zalben, she believed it was a "good direction" for the MCU moving forward since the series were "less risky", "more enjoyable", and "easier to digest". Screen Rant's Alex Harrison said Wonder Man was unique among MCU projects because it was largely separate from other storylines, and had "made good" on what Harrison felt was "the initial promise of MCU TV, before everything needed to be as big as the movies".

After reporting on Wonder Man's cancelation, Sneider opined that Marvel content needed to "feel special" and this had been lost when numerous series were being released each year. He felt series would no longer center on lesser-known characters such as Wonder Man, and Marvel would be focusing their efforts on its animated MCU shows as well as Marvel Studios Animation's pre-school series. ComicBook.com's Chris Agar similarly thought that green-lighting multiple new live-action series would contradict Feige's comments about wanting the MCU to be easier to follow after the film Avengers: Secret Wars (2027), and that Disney+ likely "ultimately did more harm than good" by over-saturating audiences and leading to "feelings of franchise fatigue". After Marvel Studios announced several animated series continuations (such as the Marvel Zombies specials), the live-action spy thriller series Zodiac (2028), and that Daredevil: Born Again would conclude with its third season, Ray Flook at Bleeding Cool opined that the live-action series were being made the "scapegoat" for the "bigger-picture issues" with the MCU series output.

In November 2026, Casey Loving at TheWrap discussed the first era of Marvel Television series, from WandaVision through the third season of Daredevil: Born Again, in conversation with Dave Gonzales, co-author of the book MCU: The Reign of Marvel Studios (2023), and Jon Giegengack, founder of Hub Entertainment Research. Loving said the era had "some pretty sharp highs and lows" and was filled with inconsistency, from varied viewership, "infrequent renewals, [and] repeated backtracking". He said too many of the series relied heavily on connecting to the MCU films, which in turn set up unrealistic expectations for characters to appear further, such as Moon Knight. When characters introduced in series did appear in films, it resulted in "weaker-than-normal box office hauls" because audiences felt they had to watch all of the series to understand the film. Gonzales said Marvel Television had been "halfway successful" in intertwining the series with the films, but they did not have the same post-production flexibility that the films have to connect projects with the next release. Gonzales believed Marvel did not embrace the television development model "until far too late in the process". Moving forward, Loving, Gonzales, and Giegengack hoped Marvel Television would continue to embrace the showrunner development model, finding people who have a passion for a certain character; continue to experiment with genres; use more modest budgeting to plan for multi-season series rather than creating miniseries that deter audience investment; try to entice new viewers with series designed to be accessible within the franchise, such as embracing the original intent of the "Spotlight" banner and only loosely referencing other MCU events; and release less content overall to make each release feel special. Giegengack felt a weekly release strategy for each series would be better than a binge model because it allows the most conversations and engagement for the series as possible.

== Repurposed, abandoned, or paused projects ==
The following projects were in development as television series before being redeveloped as potential films:

- Armor Wars: In December 2020, Marvel Studios announced Armor Wars as a Disney+ series based on the comic book storyline "Armor Wars" (1987–1988), with Don Cheadle reprising his role as James Rhodes / War Machine. In August 2021, Yassir Lester was hired as head writer. In September 2022, Marvel Studios decided to rework the series into a feature film, with Cheadle and Lester remaining with the project. Development slowed down by February 2025.
- Nova: In March 2022, writer Sabir Pirzada was revealed to be developing a Richard Rider / Nova series. Development slowed down by February 2023. In December 2024, Ed Bernero replaced Pirzada as writer and showrunner, before the series was put on pause in February 2025. In July 2026, Michael Waldron was reported to be working on a script for a Nova feature film.

The following projects were abandoned or canceled by Marvel Television during development:

- Okoye series: In February 2021, a drama series set in Wakanda was revealed to be in development from Ryan Coogler and Proximity Media. Danai Gurira signed on to reprise her film role as Okoye, the head of the Dora Milaje, by that May. It was said to be an origin story spin-off for the character. In November 2022, Marvel Studios executive Nate Moore said the series was not "far along" due to their focus on Wakanda Forever and its spin-off series Ironheart. Gurira confirmed in January 2023 that there had been discussions surrounding an Okoye-led series. In April, Moore said the studio was wary about detracting from the "cinematic experience" of the franchise by featuring characters from the Black Panther films in Disney+ series. In February 2025, Winderbaum said the series was no longer being made.
- Wonder Man season 2: In July 2026, a second season of Wonder Man was canceled after it had been announced that March. Co-creators Andrew Guest and Destin Daniel Cretton had planned to return as showrunner and director, respectively, along with stars Yahya Abdul-Mateen II and Ben Kingsley. Guest had written the first episode along with an outline for the season, with the writers' room scheduled to begin in August 2026 for a planned filming start in early 2027. He said the series was not shifting to be a feature film. The planned writers were released to pursue other projects.

The following projects were in development but were paused in February 2025. There was potential for them to come to fruition at some point, but Marvel Studios was prioritizing other projects at that time:

- Terror Inc.: An adaptation of the comic book Terror Inc. (1988–1992).
- Strange Academy: An adaptation of the comic book Strange Academy (2020–2022). Amy Rardin was developing the series, which was expected to focus on Benedict Wong's MCU character Wong as he leads a school for young people with magical abilities.

== See also ==
- List of Marvel Cinematic Universe television series actors (Marvel Studios)
- List of television series based on Marvel Comics publications
- List of Marvel Cinematic Universe television series (Marvel Television)
- List of Marvel Cinematic Universe films
- Marvel's Special Presentations
- I Am Groot
- Outline of the Marvel Cinematic Universe § Television series
