= Your Friendly Neighborhood Spider-Man =

2025 Marvel Studios animated series

- Genre: Action-adventure; Superhero
- Created by: Jeff Trammell
- Based on: Marvel Comics
- Showrunner: Jeff Trammell
- Voices of: Hudson Thames; Kari Wahlgren; Grace Song; Eugene Byrd; Zeno Robinson; Colman Domingo; Hugh Dancy; Charlie Cox
- Music by: Leo Birenberg; Zach Robinson
- Opening theme: "Neighbor Like Me" by The Math Club feat. Relaye & Melo Makes Music
- Country of origin: United States
- Original language: English
- No. of seasons: 1
- No. of episodes: 10

Production
- Executive producers: Jeff Trammell; Dana Vasquez-Eberhardt; Louis D'Esposito; Kevin Feige; Brad Winderbaum
- Producers: Danielle Costa; Tim Pauer
- Animator: Rick Glenn
- Editors: Alexander Wu; Hannah Long
- Running time: 29–33 minutes
- Production company: Marvel Studios Animation

Original release
- Network: Disney+
- Release: January 29, 2025 – present

Related
- Marvel Cinematic Universe television series

Your Friendly Neighborhood Spider-Man is an American animated television series created by Jeff Trammell for the streaming service Disney+, based on Marvel Comics featuring the character Spider-Man. It is the 12th television series in the Marvel Cinematic Universe (MCU) from Marvel Studios and is produced by Marvel Studios Animation. The series explores Peter Parker's origin story and early days as Spider-Man, and is set in an alternate timeline from the main films and television series of the MCU where Norman Osborn becomes Peter's mentor instead of Tony Stark. Trammell serves as showrunner and head writer, with Mel Zwyer as supervising director.

Hudson Thames voices Peter Parker / Spider-Man, reprising his role from the Marvel Studios animated series What If...? (2021–2024), with Kari Wahlgren, Grace Song, Eugene Byrd, Zeno Robinson, Colman Domingo, Hugh Dancy, and Charlie Cox also starring. Disney+ announced the series as Spider-Man: Freshman Year in November 2021, with Trammell attached. It was originally intended to be set in the main MCU continuity but the creative team found this too restrictive and decided to move it to an alternate timeline, allowing the series to explore familiar ideas and characters in new ways. It was retitled Your Friendly Neighborhood Spider-Man by December 2023. The 3D cel-shaded animation pays homage to the art style of early The Amazing Spider-Man comic books by Steve Ditko and John Romita Sr., with animation provided by Polygon Pictures and CGCG, Inc.

Your Friendly Neighborhood Spider-Man premiered with its first two episodes on Disney+ on January 29, 2025. The rest of the 10-episode first season was released in groups until February 19 as part of Phase Five of the MCU. The season received positive reviews from critics for its action, comedy, nostalgia, and animation style, and it won a Children's and Family Emmy Award. The second season is scheduled to premiere on January 13, 2027, as part of Phase Six. A third and fourth season are in development.

== Premise ==
Your Friendly Neighborhood Spider-Man explores Peter Parker's origin story and early days using the Spider-Man persona. The series is set in an alternate timeline to the Marvel Cinematic Universe's (MCU) main timeline, within the multiverse, where Peter gains his abilities through a temporal paradox caused by Dr. Stephen Strange time-traveling while he is fighting a symbiotic alien. Another change in this universe is that Norman Osborn becomes Peter's mentor instead of Tony Stark, as happens in the main MCU timeline.

== Episodes ==
Season	Episodes	Originally released	
Season	Episodes	First released	Last released
1	10	January 29, 2025	February 19, 2025
2	TBA	January 13, 2027	TBA

=== Season 1 (2025) ===
No.	Title	Directed by	Written by	Original release date
1	"Amazing Fantasy"	Mel Zwyer	Jeff Trammell	January 29, 2025
2	"The Parker Luck"	Liza Singer	Charlie Neuner	January 29, 2025
3	"Secret Identity Crisis"	Stu Livingston	Jeff Trammell	February 5, 2025
4	"Hitting the Big Time"	Liza Singer	Charlie Neuner	February 5, 2025
5	"The Unicorn Unleashed!"	Stu Livingston	Jeff Trammell	February 5, 2025
6	"Duel with the Devil"	Liza Singer	Charlie Neuner	February 12, 2025
7	"Scorpion Rising"	Stu Livingston	Raven Koné	February 12, 2025
8	"Tangled Web"	Liza Singer	Charlie Neuner	February 12, 2025
9	"Hero or Menace"	Liza Singer	Jeff Trammell	February 19, 2025
10	"If This Be My Destiny..."	Stu Livingston	Charlie Neuner & Jeff Trammell	February 19, 2025

=== Season 2 ===
A second season was announced in July 2022. Jeff Trammell and another writer wrote the season finale. By February 2025, animatics for the season were halfway done and some final animation was already completed. The season is set to premiere on January 13, 2027.

== Cast and characters ==
=== Main ===
- Hudson Thames as Peter Parker / Spider-Man:
  A 15-year-old freshman at Rockford T. Bales High School who gains spider-like abilities after being bitten by a spider that was injected with his own blood as part of a temporal paradox. Head writer and showrunner Jeff Trammell enjoyed exploring Peter's mindset, how he is impacted by the different characters around him, and the effect that has on his growth as Spider-Man.
- Kari Wahlgren as May Parker: Peter's widowed aunt
  - Wahlgren also voices Roxanna Volkov, a Russian criminal
- Grace Song as Nico Minoru: Peter's classmate and best friend who secretly practices witchcraft
- Eugene Byrd as Lonnie Lincoln / Tombstone:
  Peter's former classmate and captain of the Bales football team who reluctantly joins the 110th Street gang to protect his brother, leading him down a dark path. He later develops near-indestructible skin and superhuman strength after being exposed to the experimental chemical Diox-3.
- Zeno Robinson as Harry Osborn:
  Norman's influencer son who befriends Peter and provides him support as Spider-Man's "dude at the desk", referencing the "guy in the chair" terminology that is used in the Marvel Cinematic Universe's (MCU) main timeline by Ned Leeds. At the end of the first season, Harry founds his own company, the Worldwide Engineering Brigade (W.E.B.), to support young geniuses without exploiting them.
- Colman Domingo as Norman Osborn:
  The CEO of Oscorp, Harry's father, and Peter's mentor. Trammell noted that Norman is not a hero like Tony Stark—Peter's mentor in the MCU's main timeline—and his methods "may not turn out in everyone's best interest". The series explores Norman's "evolution" into his Green Goblin supervillain persona from the comics over multiple seasons.
- Hugh Dancy as Otto Octavius: A scientist who sells his high-tech weaponry and equipment to various criminals
- Charlie Cox as Daredevil: A blind masked vigilante with superhuman senses who crosses paths with Spider-Man

=== Recurring ===
- Cathy Ang as Pearl Pangan: Peter's classmate and childhood crush who formerly dated Lonnie
- Erica Luttrell as
  - Mrs. Lincoln: Lonnie and Andre's mother
  - Asha: An Oscorp intern hailing from Wakanda who later joins W.E.B.
    - Luttrell also voices Emma, Peter's classmate
- Roger Craig Smith as Phil Grayfield: The coach of the Bales football team
  - Smith also voices James Sanders / Speed Demon, Maria Vasquez's lover and partner in crime who wears high-tech boots that give him superhuman speed; Dmitri Smerdyakov / Chameleon, a Russian criminal who wears a mask to hide his identity; and John Gallo, an Oscorp security guard who Norman claims to be the true identity of Spider-Man when signing the Sokovia Accords
- Anjali Kunapaneni as Jeanne Foucault / Finesse: A vigilante allied with Daredevil who infiltrates Oscorp as an intern and later W.E.B. to spy on Norman and Harry, respectively
- Aleks Le as Amadeus Cho: An Oscorp intern who later becomes an employee
- Paul F. Tompkins as Bentley Wittman: An extremely strict Oscorp scientist who oversees the interns
- Zehra Fazal as Carla Connors: An Oscorp scientist who works with Peter during his internship
  - Fazal also voices Susan O'Hara, Nico's adoptive mother
- Leilani Barrett as Big Donovan: The leader of the 110th Street gang
- Ettore Ewen as Bulldozer: A member of the 110th Street gang
- Anairis Quiñones as Carmilla Black: The second-in-command of the Scorpions gang
  - Quiñones also voices Maria Vasquez, James Sanders's lover and partner in crime who uses high-tech gauntlets capable of generating energy blades
- Jonathan Medina as Mac Gargan / Scorpion: The leader of the Scorpions gang who wears armor equipped with a mechanized scorpion-like tail

=== Guest ===
- Kellen Goff as
  - A symbiotic alien that attacks Midtown High School
  - Vincent Patilio: Octavius's assistant
- Robin Atkin Downes as Dr. Stephen Strange: A Master of the Mystic Arts
- Phil Lamarr as
  - Mr. Taylor: Peter's science teacher
  - Mr. Lincoln: Lonnie and Andre's father
- Jake Green as Butane: An arsonist who uses high-tech, flame-throwing gauntlets
- Matte Martinez as Andre Lincoln: Lonnie's younger brother
- Alex Désert as Grift: A member of the 110th Street gang
- Travis Willingham as
  - Mikhail Sytsevich: A Russian criminal
  - Thaddeus Ross: The United States Secretary of State who attempts to enforce the Sokovia Accords
- Sarah Natochenny as Mila Masaryk / Unicorn: A Russian criminal equipped with a high-tech helmet that shoots lasers
- Zach Cherry as Klev: A bystander who records Nico's street race
- Mick Wingert as Tony Stark / Iron Man: An Avenger who operates electromechanical suits of armor of his own creation
- Josh Keaton as
  - Richard Parker: Peter's father who is incarcerated
  - Eddie Brock: A Daily Bugle reporter

The character Luna Snow makes a non-speaking cameo appearance in the series. The characters Gwen Stacy / Ghost-Spider and Venom are set to appear in the second season.

== Production ==
=== Development ===
By June 2021, Marvel Studios Animation was developing a slate of at least three more series in addition to their Disney+ series What If...? (2021–2024). The next month, these were said to be in various stages of development and were not expected to debut until at least 2023. Spider-Man: Freshman Year was announced during a Disney+ Day event in November 2021, with Jeff Trammell serving as head writer. Trammell was initially asked to pitch for X-Men '97 (2024–present) and endeared himself to Marvel Studios for wanting to tell an original story, despite plans for that series to be a revival and continuation of X-Men: The Animated Series (1992–1997). Marvel Studios's animation head Brad Winderbaum and president Kevin Feige felt Trammell would be good for a Spider-Man series. He presented a pitch in November 2020, envisioning a four-season story arc.

During Marvel Studios Animation's panel at San Diego Comic-Con in July 2022, Spider-Man: Freshman Year and the other projects discussed were referred to as being part of the "Marvel Animated Multiverse". A second season was announced at the panel with the title Spider-Man: Sophomore Year. The series was retitled Your Friendly Neighborhood Spider-Man by December 2023. In January 2025, Trammell explained that the series was not limited to covering one school year per season. When Marvel Studios decided to change the series' title, Trammell provided a list of options to consider. Your Friendly Neighborhood Spider-Man was suggested by Feige. Each of the first season's episode titles are a reference to, or inspired by, comic book titles or elements from the comics. Mel Zwyer served as supervising director, with Liza Singer and Stu Livingston as episodic directors. Marvel Studios's Feige, Louis D'Esposito, Winderbaum, and Dana Vasquez-Eberhardt were executive producers alongside Trammell.

Also in January 2025, Winderbaum said a third season had been green-lit, and Trammell was listed as both showrunner and head writer by Marvel.com. The next month, Winderbaum said the second season would be released in 2026, more than a year after the first. He said Your Friendly Neighborhood Spider-Man and X-Men '97 were the studio's top priorities for "get[ting] to a place where we can reliably have very strong seasons every year", and in October he said future seasons would be released annually "for a number of years". In October 2026, Trammell confirmed that work had begun on a fourth season.

=== Writing ===
The series was originally planned to be set within the "Sacred Timeline" of the Marvel Cinematic Universe (MCU), before Peter Parker / Spider-Man's MCU introduction in the film Captain America: Civil War (2016), and depict the character's origin story. Marvel Studios decided not to tell the origin story in the MCU films because they felt audiences would already know it due to the Spider-Man films directed by Sam Raimi (2002–2007) and Marc Webb (2012–2014). The creative team found working within the Sacred Timeline to be too restrictive regarding which characters and comic book elements could be included, so they decided to move the series to an alternate timeline, taking advantage of the MCU's multiverse concept. The story, set in an alternate reality, begins similarly to Civil War but depicts Norman Osborn becoming Peter's mentor instead of Tony Stark, which leads to Peter meeting other unexpected characters. Trammell said the series would explore Peter's identity pre-Spider-Man and how his superhero career began. The creative team took inspiration from early The Amazing Spider-Man comic books by Stan Lee and Steve Ditko, as well as previous Spider-Man animated series.

=== Casting ===
Starring in the first season are Hudson Thames as Peter Parker / Spider-Man, Kari Wahlgren as May Parker, Grace Song as Nico Minoru, Eugene Byrd as Lonnie Lincoln / Tombstone, Zeno Robinson as Harry Osborn, Colman Domingo as Norman Osborn, Hugh Dancy as Otto Octavius, and Charlie Cox as Daredevil.

=== Animation and design ===
Because Marvel Studios Animation does not have a "house style", the creative team was free to develop an animation style that differed from previous series What If...? and X-Men '97. They wanted to avoid copying one of the many different animation styles used for the animated Spider-Verse films and settled on paying homage to the early The Amazing Spider-Man comic books, specifically those featuring art by Steve Ditko and John Romita Sr. Trammell described the series as a "moving comic book", which is achieved through 3D cel-shaded animation provided by Polygon Pictures and CGCG, Inc. Polygon was chosen because of the 2D animation look they had achieved in their previous work. Trammell said the company was able to match their desired style while keeping the "characters feeling alive and real, without feeling stiff and mechanical".

=== Music ===
Leo Birenberg and Zach Robinson were revealed to be composing the series' score in June 2024. The series' theme song, "Neighbor Like Me" by The Math Club featuring Relaye and Melo Makes Music, is a rap that samples the theme song from the animated series Spider-Man (1967–1970) by Paul Francis Webster and Bob Harris. Like the series' animation, Trammell wanted the theme song to be "something classic that we all love" through the use of the 1960s sample, while still having a modern style. The song was released as a single by Hollywood Records and Marvel Music on January 21, 2025. A soundtrack album featuring the theme song and excerpts from Birenberg and Robinson's score for the first season was released digitally on February 21.

== Release ==
Your Friendly Neighborhood Spider-Man premiered with its first two episodes on Disney+ on January 29, 2025. The rest of the 10-episode first season was released in groups of two or three episodes until February 19, as part of Phase Five of the MCU. The second season is scheduled to premiere on January 13, 2027, as part of Phase Six. Winderbaum said in October 2025 that future seasons would be released annually "for a number of years".

== Reception ==
=== Viewership ===
Nielsen Media Research, which records streaming viewership on U.S. television screens, reported that Your Friendly Neighborhood Spider-Man was streamed for 1.2 billion minutes during the period from January 1, 2023, to July 4, 2026.

=== Critical response ===
The first season received positive reviews for its action, comedy, nostalgia, and animation style, though some critics found the latter to be jarring at first. The review aggregator website Rotten Tomatoes reported a 97% approval score with an average rating of 8.1/10, based on 38 reviews. The site's critical consensus reads: "Embracing the wholesome aesthetics of the webslinger's original comic run while adding some fresh plot wrinkles, this family-friendly Spider-Man is a lovable incarnation of the Marvel superhero." Metacritic, which uses a weighted average, assigned a score of 77 out of 100 based on 10 critics, indicating "generally favorable" reviews.

=== Accolades ===
Accolades received by Your Friendly Neighborhood Spider-Man
Award	Date of ceremony	Category	Recipient(s)	Result	Ref.
Artios Awards	February 26, 2026	Animated Program For Television	Sara Jane Sherman	Nominated	
Children's and Family Emmy Awards	March 2, 2026	Outstanding Voice Directing for an Animated Series	Sara Jane Sherman (for "If This Be My Destiny...")	Won	
Children's and Family Emmy Awards	March 2, 2026	Outstanding Show Open	Your Friendly Neighborhood Spider-Man	Nominated	
Critics' Choice Television Awards	January 4, 2026	Best Animated Series	Your Friendly Neighborhood Spider-Man	Nominated	
Golden Trailer Awards	May 29, 2025	Best Animation/Family (TV Spot) for a TV/Streaming Series	Your Friendly Neighborhood Spider-Man "All Streaming"	Nominated	
Golden Trailer Awards	May 29, 2025	Best Animation TrailerByte for a Feature Film	Your Friendly Neighborhood Spider-Man "Protect"	Won	
Saturn Awards	March 8, 2026	Best Animated Television Series or Special	Your Friendly Neighborhood Spider-Man	Nominated	
TCA Awards	August 20, 2025	Outstanding Achievement in Family Programming	Your Friendly Neighborhood Spider-Man	Nominated	

== Other media ==
In September 2024, Marvel Comics announced a five-issue comic book prequel series, also titled Your Friendly Neighborhood Spider-Man, that was written by Christos Gage and features art by Eric Gapstur. Trammell explained that the comic fills a gap in the timeline of the series' first episode, and said it was possible that more comic books could be written to fill other timeline gaps later in the series. The comic includes characters not featured in the series such as Silvio Manfredi / Silvermane, Crusher Hogan, Man Mountain Marko, and the Enforcers members Montana, Fancy Dan, and Ox. It was published from December 11, 2024, to April 23, 2025.

In September 2026, Marvel Comics announced a four-issue comic book prequel series, titled Your Friendly Neighborhood Spider-Man Season 2, with Gage and Gapstur returning once again as writer and artist, respectively. Gage developed the comic in coordination with Trammell. It is set between the first and second season of the series, and introduces several members of Spider-Man's rogues' gallery, including Flint Marko / Sandman. The first issue is scheduled for release on December 9.
