= Saturn Award for Best Animated Series on Television =

Annual US television award

Saturn Award for Best Animated Series or Film on Television
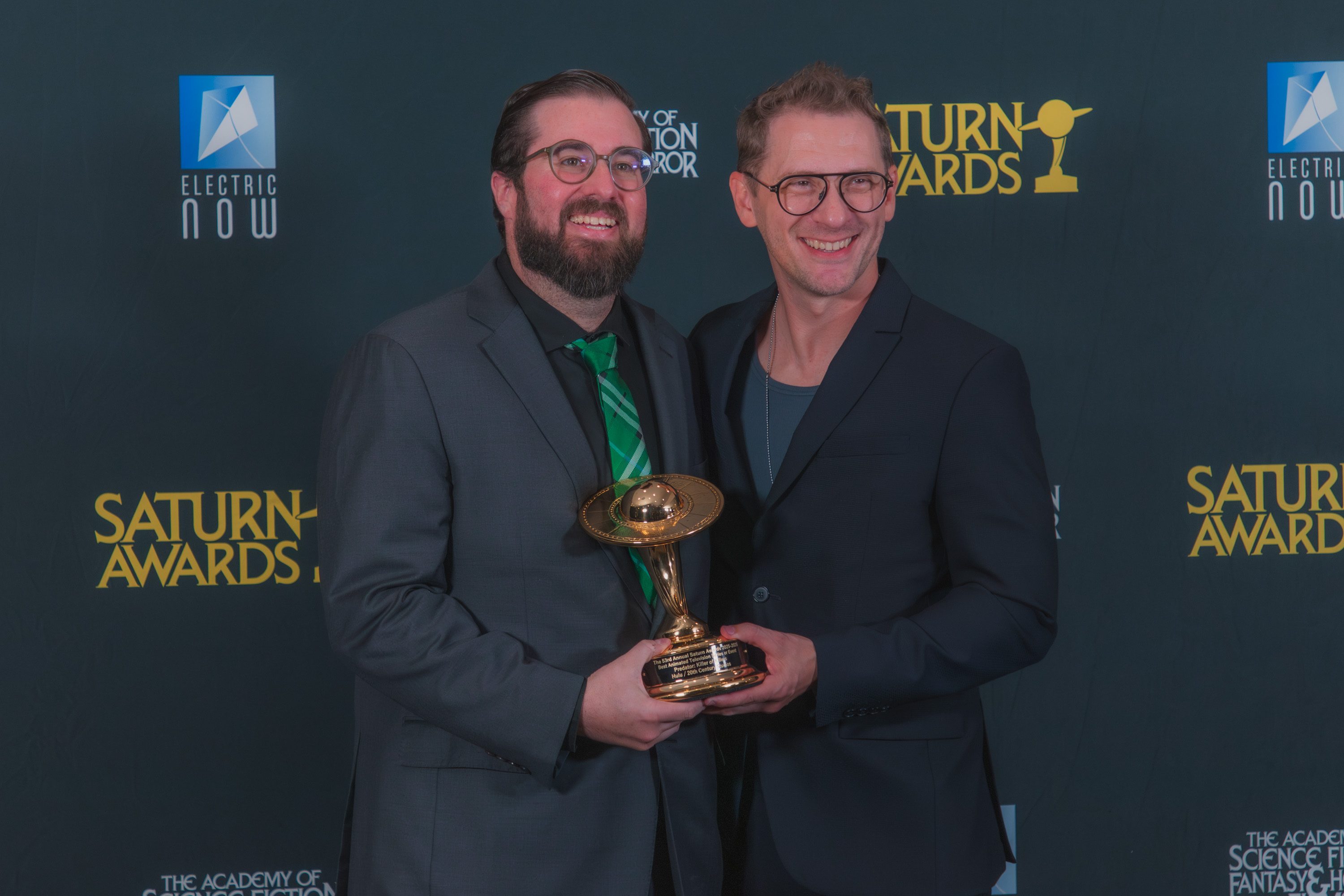
- The 2024/2025 recipients for Predator: Killer of Killers
- Awarded for: Best genre animated series or television film of the year
- Country: United States
- Presented by: Academy of Science Fiction, Fantasy and Horror Films
- First award: 2017
- Currently held by: Predator: Killer of Killers (2024/2025)
- Website: www.saturnawards.org

The Saturn Award for Best Animated Series on Television (formerly Saturn Award for Best Animated Series or Film on Television) is one of the annual awards given by the Academy of Science Fiction, Fantasy and Horror Films. The Saturn Awards are the oldest film and series-specialized awards to reward science fiction, fantasy, and horror achievements.

Included as a category for the first time at the 43rd Saturn Awards ceremony, when the Saturn Awards went through major changes in their television categories, it specifically rewarded animated series or films on television. Beginning with the 45th Saturn Awards, the category had its title changed, focusing solely on animated shows. Since its inception, the category has been exclusively won by Star Wars shows. To date, The Bad Batch is the only show to win three times in a row.

== Winners and nominees ==
In the following tables the years refer to the year of eligibility—the actual ceremonies are held the following year. The winners are listed in bold.

=== 2010s ===
Year	TV Series	Network/Streaming service
2016 **(43rd)**	**Star Wars Rebels**	**Disney XD**
2016 **(43rd)**	BoJack Horseman	Netflix
2016 **(43rd)**	Family Guy	Fox
2016 **(43rd)**	The Little Prince	Netflix
2016 **(43rd)**	The Simpsons	Fox
2016 **(43rd)**	Trollhunters	Netflix
2016 **(43rd)**	Teen Titans Go!	Cartoon Network
2017 **(44th)**	**Star Wars Rebels**	**Disney XD**
2017 **(44th)**	Archer	FX
2017 **(44th)**	BoJack Horseman	Netflix
2017 **(44th)**	Cloudy with a Chance of Meatballs	Cartoon Network
2017 **(44th)**	Family Guy	Fox
2017 **(44th)**	Rick and Morty	Adult Swim
2017 **(44th)**	The Simpsons	Fox
2018/2019 **(45th)**	**Star Wars Resistance**	**Disney Channel**
2018/2019 **(45th)**	Archer	FX
2018/2019 **(45th)**	DuckTales	Disney Channel
2018/2019 **(45th)**	Family Guy	Fox
2018/2019 **(45th)**	The Simpsons	Fox
2019/2020 **(46th)**	**Star Wars: The Clone Wars**	**Disney+**
2019/2020 **(46th)**	BoJack Horseman	Netflix
2019/2020 **(46th)**	Family Guy	Fox
2019/2020 **(46th)**	Primal	Adult Swim
2019/2020 **(46th)**	Rick and Morty	Adult Swim
2019/2020 **(46th)**	The Simpsons	Fox

=== 2020s ===
Year	TV Series	Network/Streaming service
2021/2022 **(50th)**	**Star Wars: The Bad Batch**	**Disney+**
2021/2022 **(50th)**	Arcane	Netflix
2021/2022 **(50th)**	Blade Runner: Black Lotus	Adult Swim
2021/2022 **(50th)**	The Boys Presents: Diabolical	Amazon Prime Video
2021/2022 **(50th)**	Invincible	Amazon Prime Video
2021/2022 **(50th)**	Star Trek: Lower Decks	Paramount+
2021/2022 **(50th)**	What if...?	Disney+
2022/2023 **(51st)**	**Star Wars: The Bad Batch**	**Disney+**
2022/2023 **(51st)**	Chainsaw Man	Crunchyroll
2022/2023 **(51st)**	Gremlins: Secrets of the Mogwai	Max
2022/2023 **(51st)**	Guillermo del Toro's Pinocchio	Netflix
2022/2023 **(51st)**	Harley Quinn	Max
2022/2023 **(51st)**	My Adventures with Superman	Adult Swim
2022/2023 **(51st)**	Star Trek: Lower Decks	Paramount+
2023/2024 **(52nd)**	**Star Wars: The Bad Batch**	**Disney+**
2023/2024 **(52nd)**	Batman: Caped Crusader	Amazon Prime Video
2023/2024 **(52nd)**	Gremlins: The Wild Batch	Max
2023/2024 **(52nd)**	Kaiju No. 8	Crunchyroll
2023/2024 **(52nd)**	Star Trek: Lower Decks	Paramount+
2023/2024 **(52nd)**	X-Men '97	Disney+
2024/2025 **(53rd)**	**Predator: Killer of Killers**	**Hulu**
2024/2025 **(53rd)**	Creature Commandos	HBO Max
2024/2025 **(53rd)**	Harley Quinn	HBO Max
2024/2025 **(53rd)**	Marvel Zombies	Disney+
2024/2025 **(53rd)**	Solo Leveling − Arise from the Shadow	Crunchyroll
2024/2025 **(53rd)**	Star Wars: Tales of the Underworld	Disney+
2024/2025 **(53rd)**	Your Friendly Neighborhood Spider-Man	Disney+

== Most nominations ==
- 4 nominations – Family Guy, The Simpsons
- 3 nominations – BoJack Horseman, Star Trek: Lower Decks, Star Wars: The Bad Batch
- 2 nominations – Archer, Rick and Morty, Star Wars Rebels

== Most wins ==
- 3 wins – Star Wars: The Bad Batch
- 2 wins – Star Wars Rebels
