= Hudson Thames =

- Born: March 19, 1994 (age 32); Los Angeles, California, U.S.
- Occupations: Actor, musician
- Years active: 2006–present
- Parent: Byron Thames
- Musical career
- Genres: Pop music; jazz
- Labels: Loaded Dice Entertainment; Republic Records

Hudson Thames (born March 19, 1994) is an American actor and musician best known as the voice of Peter Parker / Spider-Man in the Marvel Animation series What If...? (2021), Your Friendly Neighborhood Spider-Man (2025–present), and Marvel Zombies (2025).

== Career ==
Hudson Thames began his career on Broadway portraying the lead role of Evan, in Jason Robert Browns' 13, starring Ariana Grande and Elizabeth Gillies. Hudson pursued a career in both acting and music and was signed to Republic Records in 2015. His first single, How I Want Ya, caught the attention of Taylor Swift, who shared the song to her followers. This ultimately led to a collaboration with Hailee Steinfeld who joined the song as a duet. Soon after, Grey's Anatomy featured the song prominently which helped bring the song to radio and worldwide performances. After releasing his debut EP, Lip Tricks, Hudson Performed the main theme, 'Drive it Like You Stole It ' for John Carneys' critically acclaimed film, Sing Street. Hudson released his debut album Bambino on January 24, 2025.

In 2021, he was cast as the voice of Peter Parker / Spider-Man in the Marvel Cinematic Universe television series What If...?, replacing Tom Holland, who portrays the character in live-action films. He reprised the role for the 2025 animated series Your Friendly Neighborhood Spider-Man.

== Filmography ==
=== Film ===
Year	Title	Role	Notes
2007	Boxboarders!	Rick James	
2008	Bone Dry	Son	
2009	Bride Wars	Additional voices	
2010	Marmaduke	Delinquent Dog	Voice role
2013	The Tale of the Princess Kaguya	Old Friend	Voice role; English dub
2015	The A-List	Eric Schultz	
2015	Sex, Death and Bowling	Teenage Sean	
2018	Next Gen	Additional voices	
2021	Far More	Teenage Sean	
2025	Oak	Fletcher Wilson	

=== Television ===
Year	Title	Role	Notes
2006	The Adventures of Big Handsome Guy and His Little Friend	Young Guy	TV Pilot
2007	Without a Trace	Jay Douglas	Episode: "Lost Boy"
2008	The Prince of Motor City	Young Jamie	TV Pilot
2010	'Til Death	Feldman	2 episodes
2011	The Protector	Guy	Episode: "Class"
2011	Shake It Up	D'Artagnan	2 episodes
2011	Criminal Minds	Randy Slade	Episode: "Painless"
2011	Exit 19	Derek	TV Pilot
2011–2012	Rule the Mix	Tyler	Main cast
2012	Greetings from Home	Chris	Main cast
2012–2013	Malibu Country	Sage	Recurring
2012–2013	The Secret Life of the American Teenager	Brian	Recurring
2013	Mad Men	Mitchell Rosen	Episode: "Favors"
2013	Welcome to the Family	Noah	Episode: "Molly and Junior Find a Place"
2015	Kirby Buckets	Devin	Episode: "Day of the Cat"
2017	Sleepovers	Dillon James	TV Pilot
2019	I Think You Should Leave with Tim Robinson	Caleb Went	Episode: "I'm Wearing One of Their Belts Right Now"
2020	American Soul	Elton John	2 episodes
2021	What If...?	Peter Parker / Spider-Man	Voice role; Episode: "What If... Zombies?!"
2021	Ghosts	Crash	Episode: "Pilot"
2025–present	Your Friendly Neighborhood Spider-Man	Peter Parker / Spider-Man	Voice role; 10 episodes
2025	Marvel Zombies	Peter Parker / Spider-Man	Voice role; 2 episodes
