= Marvel Studios Animation =

American television animation division

- Logo used since 2024
- Trade name: Marvel Animation
- Type: Division
- Industry: Entertainment; Animation
- Genre: Superhero fiction
- Founded: July 21, 2021; 5 years ago
- Headquarters: Burbank, California, United States
- Key people: Brad Winderbaum (head of television, animation, comics & franchise); Dana Vasquez-Eberhardt (VP of animation)
- Products: Animation
- Services: Production; Licensing
- Parent: Marvel Studios

Marvel Studios Animation, also known as Marvel Animation, is the animation division of American production company Marvel Studios. Established in 2021 as a "mini studio", it develops animated projects based on Marvel Comics properties, both within and outside the Marvel Cinematic Universe (MCU). The division oversees development and production, with animation work outsourced to external studios.

Since its establishment, Marvel Studios Animation has released the series What If...?, X-Men '97, Your Friendly Neighborhood Spider-Man, Eyes of Wakanda, and Marvel Zombies, as well as the animated shorts I Am Groot. Three continuation specials for Marvel Zombies are also planned. The division also took over production of the Disney Jr. series Spidey and His Amazing Friends beginning with its second season, and has since overseen related productions, including Iron Man and His Awesome Friends, the upcoming Avengers: Mightiest Friends, and two television specials.

== History ==
Animated version of the Marvel Studios logo that appeared in the division's projects until 2023

In March 2019, it was revealed that Marvel Studios was developing an animated anthology series based on the What If comic book concept to explore how the Marvel Cinematic Universe (MCU) would be altered if certain events had occurred differently. Disney and Marvel officially announced What If...? the following month. The series of animated short films I Am Groot was announced in December 2020.

In June 2021, Marvel Studios executive vice president of film production Victoria Alonso said the studio's expansion to animation with the series What If...? was an opportunity to make the MCU more diverse. At that time, Marvel Studios was creating an "animation branch and mini studio", to focus on more animated content beyond What If...?, building infrastructure to handle multiple animated series at once and looking to hire around 300 new staff for production roles on a slate of Disney+ animated series. Marvel Studios' Brad Winderbaum, the executive who was in charge of What If...?, was promoted to head of streaming, television, and animation at Marvel Studios, and in September, Alonso was promoted to president of physical and post-production, VFX and animation. Dana Vasquez-Eberhardt also serves as the vice president of animation. During the Disney+ Day event in November 2021, Marvel Studios officially announced an animated Spider-Man prequel series titled Spider-Man: Freshman Year, the What If...?–related Marvel Zombies, and X-Men '97, a revival and continuation of X-Men: The Animated Series. What If...? director Bryan Andrews said each additional animated series would exist "on its own term[s] and hopefully explore unexpected facets of the MCU", with Winderbaum saying the studio would only tell stories that they felt needed to be told in animated form.

By April 2022, the division was announced to be taking over production for the Disney Jr. preschool series Spidey and His Amazing Friends starting with its second season; the series' first season was released under Marvel Entertainment. During Marvel Studios' animation panel at the July 2022 San Diego Comic-Con, the projects discussed were introduced as being part of the "Marvel Animated Multiverse". Shortly after, Winderbaum said the Multiverse Saga of the MCU and its exploration of the multiverse allowed the studio to "look at alternate paths and other takes on the characters... see[ing] them expanding and growing in unforeseen, unexpected ways", which he stated was the "guiding light" for the animated projects. By September, Brian Kesinger was attached to direct an animated series for Marvel Studios, though it was canceled shortly after.

By January 2023, the division was being referred to as "Marvel Studios Animation". In March 2023, Alonso was fired from her role at Marvel Studios by a group including Disney Entertainment co-chairman Alan Bergman and Disney's human resources and legal departments for serving as a producer on the Amazon Studios film Argentina, 1985 (2022); this was a breach of a 2018 agreement between Alonso and Disney which stated employees would not work for a competing studio. Alonso reportedly did not seek permission to work on the film, and was asked by Disney to stop working on the film, as well as not to promote or publicize it, with the situation "deemed serious enough" that Disney requested a new agreement be signed. Despite this, Alonso continued to promote the film following its September 2022 premiere, and was consistently reminded of her agreement and breach of contract, ultimately leading to her firing. Alonso's lawyers refuted this claim, stating Disney was aware of, and agreed to, Alonso's work on Argentina, 1985, and that she was instead "silenced[... and] was terminated when she refused to do something she believed was reprehensible"; this incident was reported to be a disagreement with a Disney executive over the censoring of gay pride elements in Ant-Man and the Wasp: Quantumania (2023) to release the film in Kuwait and comply with its restrictive anti-LGBTQ laws. A Disney spokesperson reiterated the notion that she was fired due to "an indisputable breach of contract and a direct violation of company policy" among other "key factors".

In December 2023, Marvel Animation announced Eyes of Wakanda, with Black Panther (2018) and Black Panther: Wakanda Forever (2022) director Ryan Coogler involved through his production company Proximity Media. Freshman Year was also retitled Your Friendly Neighborhood Spider-Man. The division's formal name of Marvel Animation was further confirmed in February 2024 with the release of the first trailer for X-Men '97. A logo for the division was also revealed. The "Marvel Animation" name and banner was used for the division's projects moving forward, existing alongside Marvel Studios' "Marvel Television" banner for its live-action Disney+ series. This was done to help indicate to audiences that they did not have to watch all of the studio's projects to understand the overall story and could choose which storylines and characters under these banners to follow. The Marvel Animation and Television banners still exist under Marvel Studios, which Feige noted was not the case with the previous incarnations of each. In July 2024, it was reported that the studio had spent nearly $20 million on an upcoming project between June 2022 and June 2023, which was believed to be Eyes of Wakanda.

== Process ==
Similar to other animation studios, Marvel Studios Animation outsources its animation to other studios; Alonso said the medium of animation allowed Marvel Studios to work with new companies around the world. Winderbaum stated that Marvel Studios was open to working with corporate siblings Pixar and Walt Disney Animation Studios on animated MCU content "under the right circumstances". The preschool projects are co-produced with Disney Jr. in association with animation studio Atomic Cartoons, and Eyes of Wakanda is produced with Proximity Media.

According to Marvel Studios' head of visual development Ryan Meinerding, Marvel Studios Animation uses techniques similar to those used in comics, which allows the studio to adapt Marvel comics "in a way that's maybe more powerful than the films". Winderbaum noted Marvel Studios had to alter its production process for its animated projects, noting "it requires so much more forethought" than live-action production, where Marvel Studios usually makes most changes to its projects during post-production. He also said that the type of animation used in a series would depend on what the producers felt fit for each series. Unlike VFX artists for the live-action productions, artists at the animation studio are hired directly by Marvel and work in-house at Marvel Studios Animation. The studio works under a strict deadline structure, which was criticized by a senior animator as the studio "asking for things that can't be done".

== Production library ==
=== Disney+ series ===
All Disney+ series from Marvel Studios Animation are set in the Marvel Cinematic Universe unless otherwise noted.

Disney series produced by Marvel Studios Animation
Title	Released	No of seasons	Production partner	Animation services	Notes
What If...?	2021–2024	3	—N/a	Blue Spirit; Flying Bark Productions; Squeeze; Stellar Creative Lab; SDFX Studios	This series takes place in an alternate timeline outside of the MCU's "Sacred Timeline".
I Am Groot	2022–2023	2	—N/a	Luma Pictures; Trixter	
X-Men '97	2024–present	2	—N/a	Studio Mir; Tiger Animation; Red Dog Culture House; Jam Filled Entertainment	Revival of X-Men: The Animated Series and set in that continuity Renewed for seasons 3 and 4
Your Friendly Neighborhood Spider-Man	2025–present	1	—N/a	Polygon Pictures; CGCG, Inc.	This series takes place in an alternate timeline outside of the MCU's "Sacred Timeline". Renewed for seasons 2 through 4
Eyes of Wakanda	2025	1	Proximity Media	Axis Animation; Studio AKA	
Marvel Zombies	2025–present	1	—N/a	Stellar Creative Lab	This series takes place in an alternate timeline outside of the MCU's "Sacred Timeline". Spin-off from What If...? Renewed for three, two-episode specials The Winter Soldier, The Fist of Khonshu, and The Last Guardian, to release yearly in October in 2027, 2028, and 2029, respectively.

=== Disney Jr. series and specials ===
==== Released ====
Disney Jr. television series and specials produced by Marvel Studios Animation
Title	Released	No of seasons	Production partner	Animation services	Notes
Spidey and His Amazing Friends	2022–present	5	Atomic Cartoons		Season 2 onward Renewed for seasons 6 and 7
Iron Man and His Awesome Friends	2025–present	1	Atomic Cartoons		Spin-off of Spidey and His Amazing Friends
Spidey and Iron Man: Avengers Team-Up!	October 16, 2025	—N/a	Atomic Cartoons		Crossover special between Spidey and His Amazing Friends and Iron Man and His Awesome Friends
Spidey and the Avengers: Halloween Team-Up!	September 24, 2026	—N/a	Atomic Cartoons		Crossover special between Spidey and His Amazing Friends and Iron Man and His Awesome Friends

==== Upcoming ====
Upcoming television series produced by Marvel Studios Animation
Title	Released	No of seasons	Production partner	Animation services	Notes
Avengers: Mightiest Friends	2027	—N/a	Atomic Cartoons		Spin-off of Spidey and His Amazing Friends and Iron Man and His Awesome Friends

== See also ==
- Marvel Animation, a separate animation studio that centers on Marvel properties
- Marvel Productions, a defunct animation studio that also centered on Marvel properties
