= Disney+ Day =

Annual virtual event from Disney

- Status: Discontinued
- Genre: Film; Television
- Frequency: Annual
- Venue: Online
- Location: Global
- Years active: 2
- Inaugurated: November 12, 2021; 4 years ago
- Most recent: September 8, 2022; 4 years ago
- Organizer: The Walt Disney Company
- Sponsors: 2021 event: AMC Theatres; Funko; IMAX; Target; WizKids; 2022 event: AMC Theatres
- Website: www.disneyplus.com/welcome/disneyplusday

Disney+ Day was an annual event hosted by the Walt Disney Company to promote its Disney+, Hulu, and Star+ streaming services, featuring announcements of new feature films and television series from those services and produced by the Walt Disney Studios.

The event was inaugurated in 2021, coinciding with the second anniversary of Disney+, and returned on September 8, 2022. The 2021 event was poorly received by viewers and commentators alike, with criticism toward Disney's decision to publish its announcements in the form of a Twitter thread as well as the minimal amount of new footage shown.

== Events ==
=== 2021 ===
The first Disney+ Day event was held on November 12, 2021, coinciding with the second anniversary of the Walt Disney Company's Disney+ streaming service, and was announced by the company on September 21. During the event, Disney announced numerous feature films, television series, and short films set to be released on Disney+, Hulu, and Star+ and produced by Walt Disney Pictures, Pixar Animation Studios, Marvel Studios, Lucasfilm, National Geographic, and 20th Century Studios. Several films, television series, and television specials were also released on the aforementioned streaming services as "Disney+ Day Premieres", while 13 Marvel Cinematic Universe (MCU) films were made available at an "IMAX Enhanced" expanded aspect ratio on Disney+.

Disney accompanied the event with an extensive week-long marketing campaign, featuring many company-wide promotions. These include a Disney+ discount for new subscribers, coupled with an offer from the Disney Movie Insiders rewards program; daily screenings of Disney films at select AMC Theatres locations; special benefits at Disney Parks; "in-store activations" at Target stores; as well as offers and discounts at shopDisney, the Disney Publishing Worldwide webstore, the Disney Music Emporium, Funko, and WizKids. On television, special advertisements were aired on Freeform, ESPN, FX, and Hulu; references to Disney+ Day were added to the week's episodes of numerous ABC television shows; while Good Morning America featured interviews from guests and live celebrations at Disney Parks. Disney+ also unveiled a redesigned user interface, launched a TikTok account, announced a series of NFT digital collectibles in collaboration with VeVe, and expanded access to the service in children's hospitals in EMEA. In addition, large inflatable pop-up balloons of the Disney+ logo, Captain America's shield, Olaf, Boba Fett's helmet, Maggie Simpson, the Pixar Luxo Ball, and the National Geographic logo were erected in New York City, Nashville, Paris, Rio de Janeiro, Los Angeles, and Copenhagen.

=== 2022 ===
The second Disney+ Day event was held on September 8, 2022, ahead of the 2022 D23 Expo. Similar to the previous year, the event was accompanied by the release of several films and series produced by Disney, Pixar, Marvel, Lucasfilm, and National Geographic onto Disney's streaming services. A discount was once again offered to new Disney+ subscribers, while five Disney-owned films were re-released at select AMC Theatres locations. Disney Parks again featured a series of special promotions and celebrations, shopDisney introduced new Disney+ Day-themed merchandise, and Disney also announced promotions for National Geographic Digital, Uber One, and Disney Movie Insiders.

== Reception ==
The 2021 Disney+ Day event was negatively received. Chelsea Avestruz of Screen Rant called it an "unadulterated disaster", criticizing Disney for publishing its announcements in the form of a "poorly constructed" Twitter thread and failing to prevent leaks online. Adam B. Vary of Variety and Hannah Shaw-Williams of /Film echoed Avestruz's sentiments regarding the Twitter thread, with Vary adding that the company failed to generate excitement due to the lack of new footage shown and Shaw-Williams questioning Disney's decision to release most of the new MCU and Star Wars footage on Disney+, effectively behind a paywall. Many viewers expressed their disappointment and confusion online, especially fans of the MCU and Star Wars. From November 12 through 14, Disney+ experienced a spike in subscriber growth, gaining a total of approximately 306,322 sign-ups over the course of three days.

== See also ==
- DC FanDome
- Star Wars Day
