= List of Marvel Cinematic Universe television series actors (Marvel Studios) =

Television series actors list

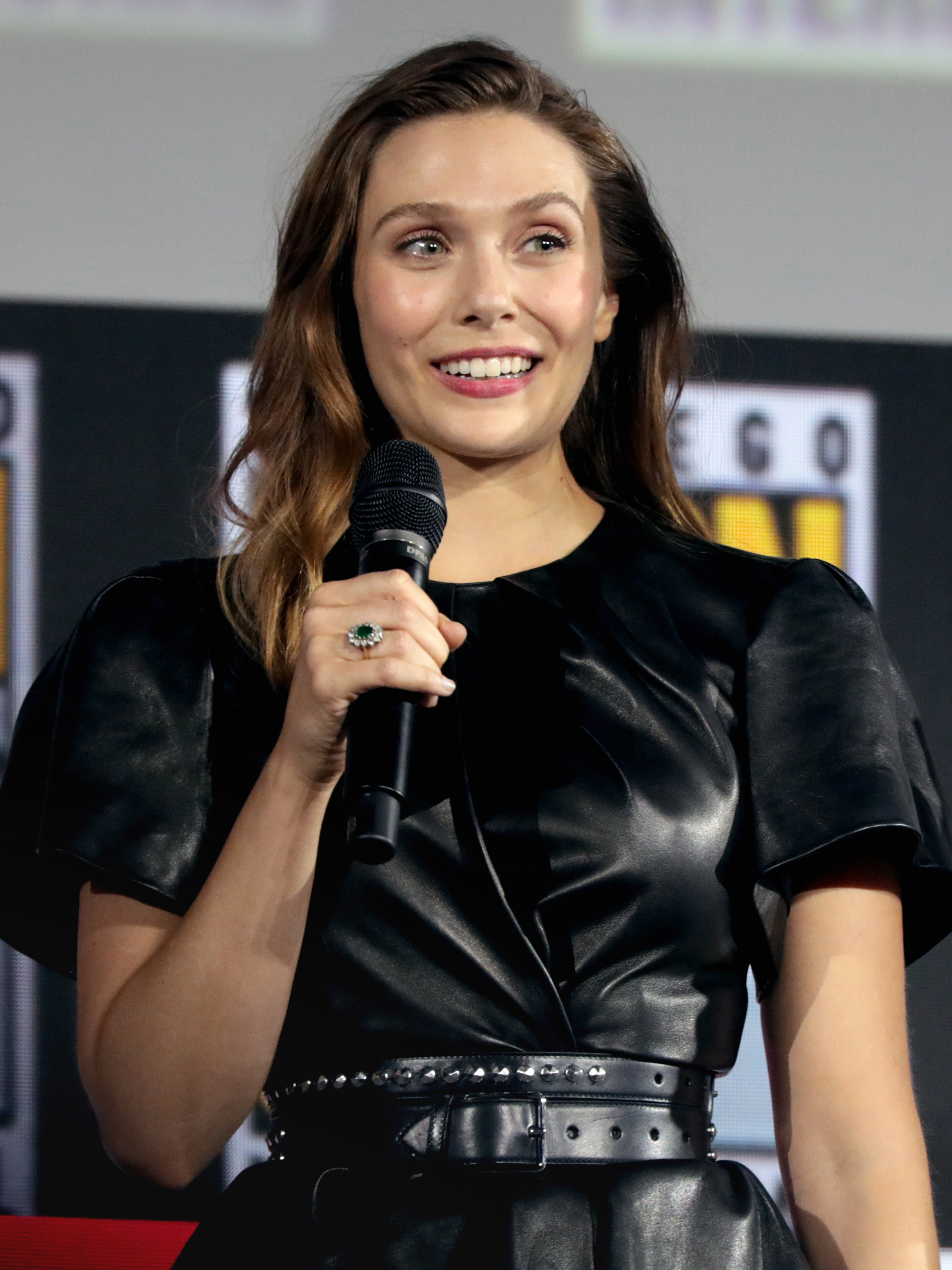
Elizabeth Olsen

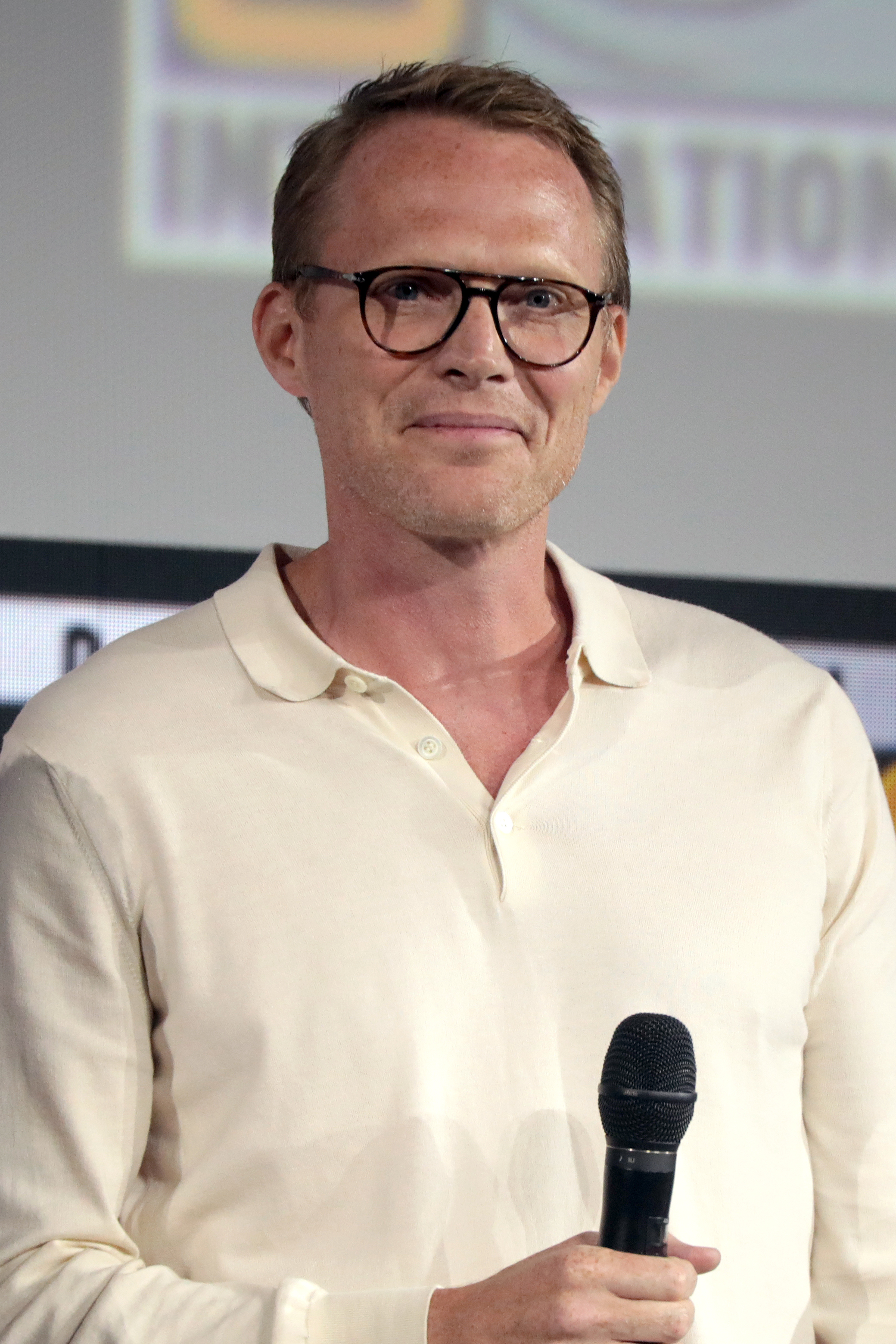
Paul Bettany

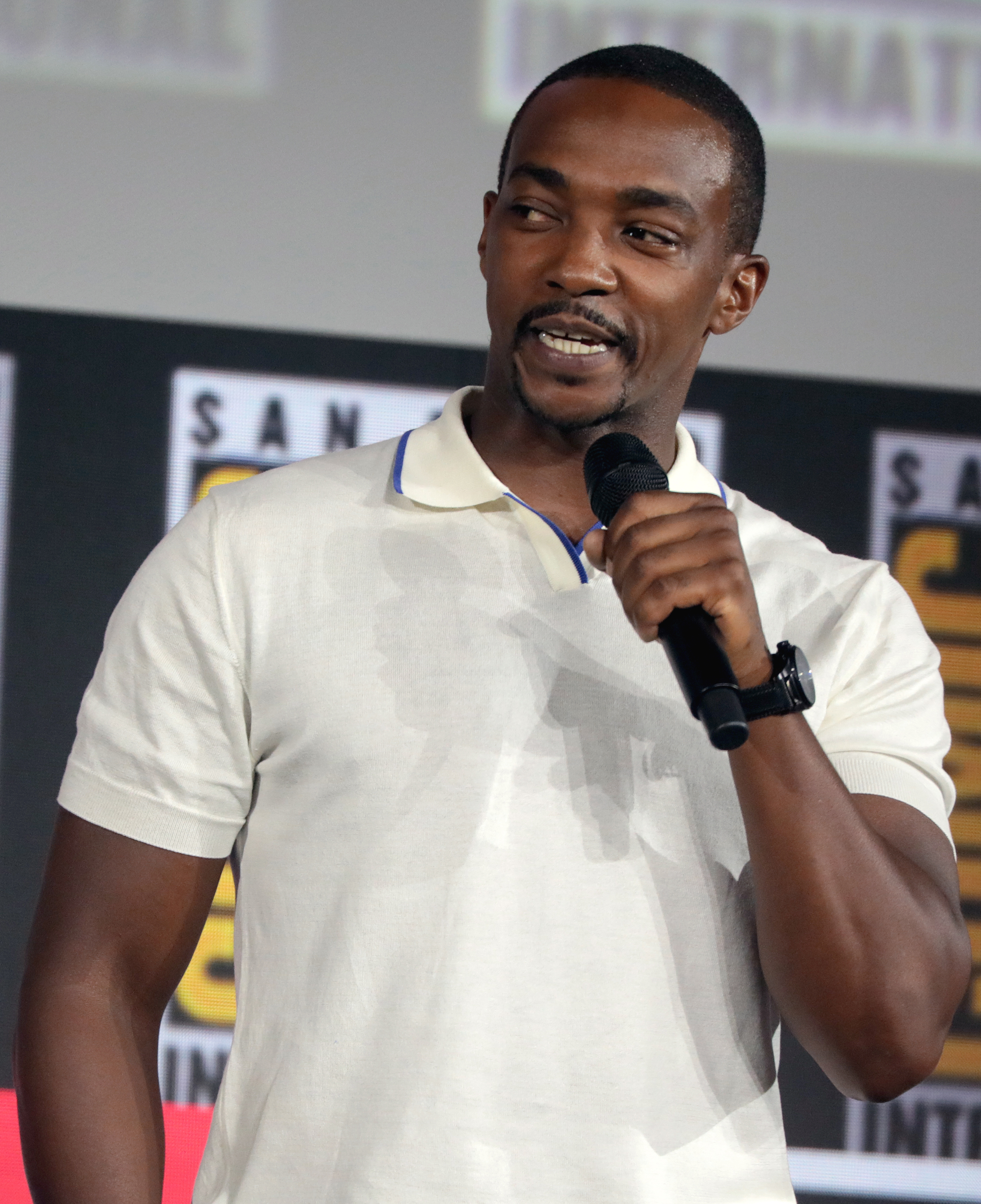
Anthony Mackie

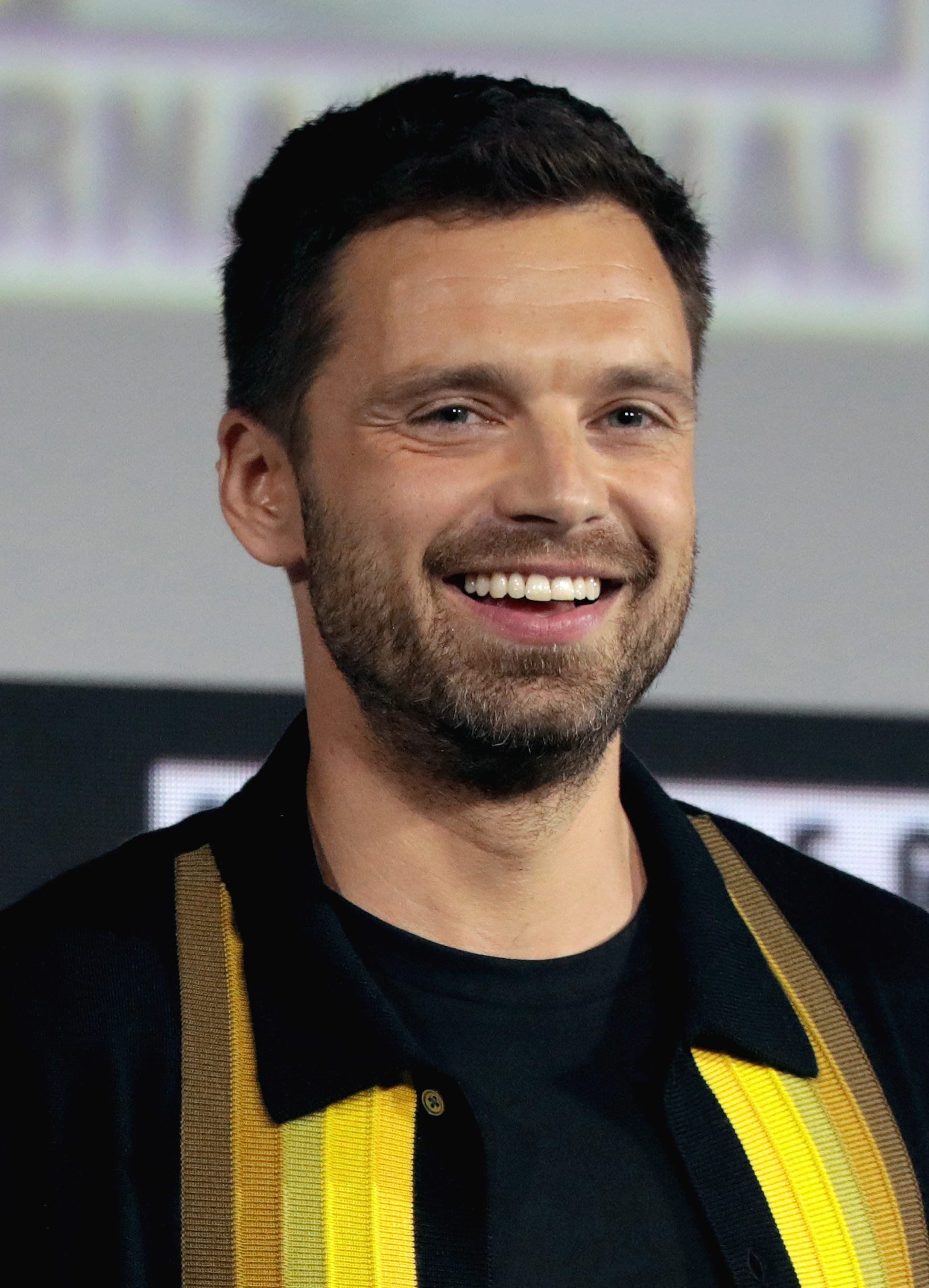
Sebastian Stan

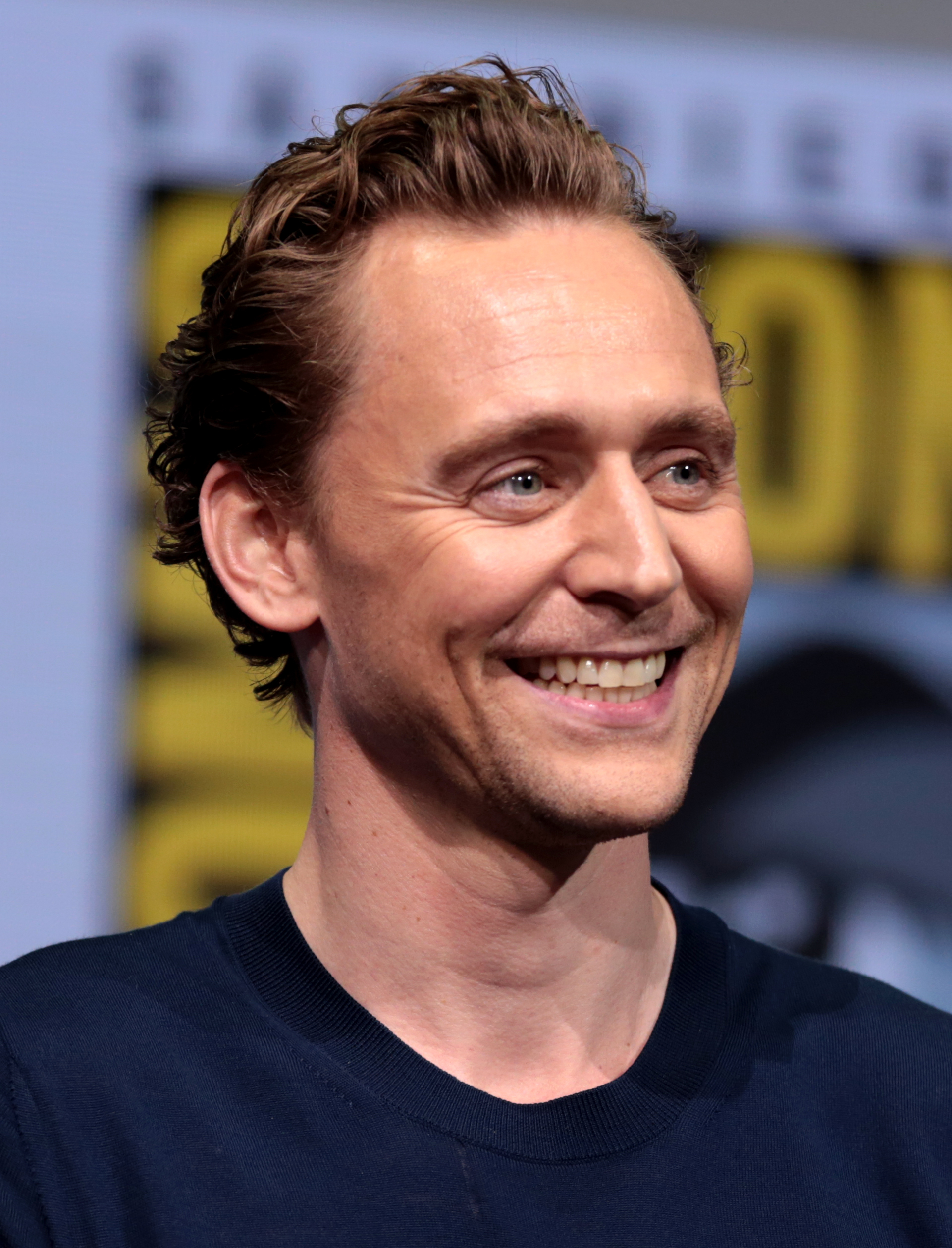
Tom Hiddleston

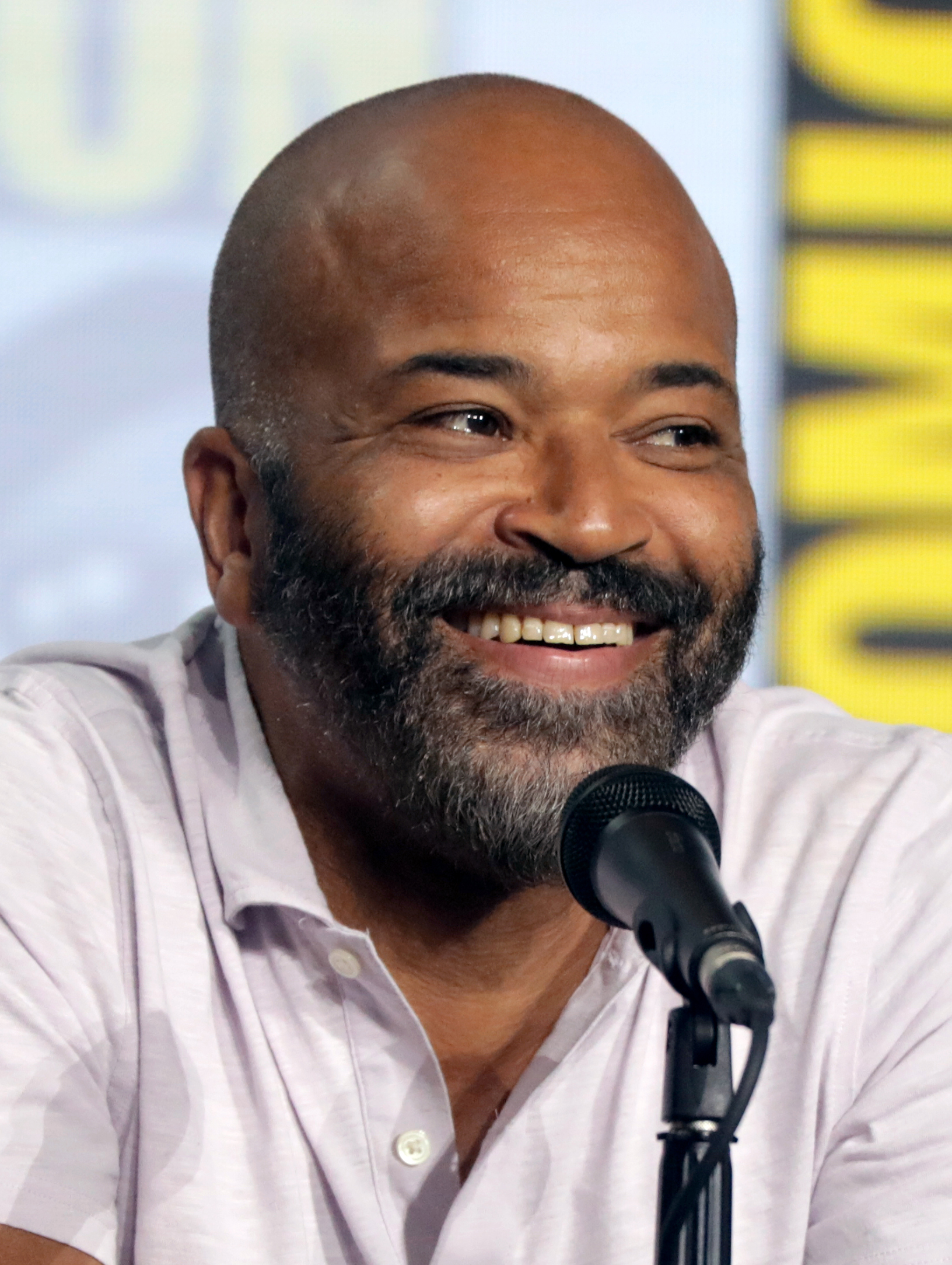
Jeffrey Wright

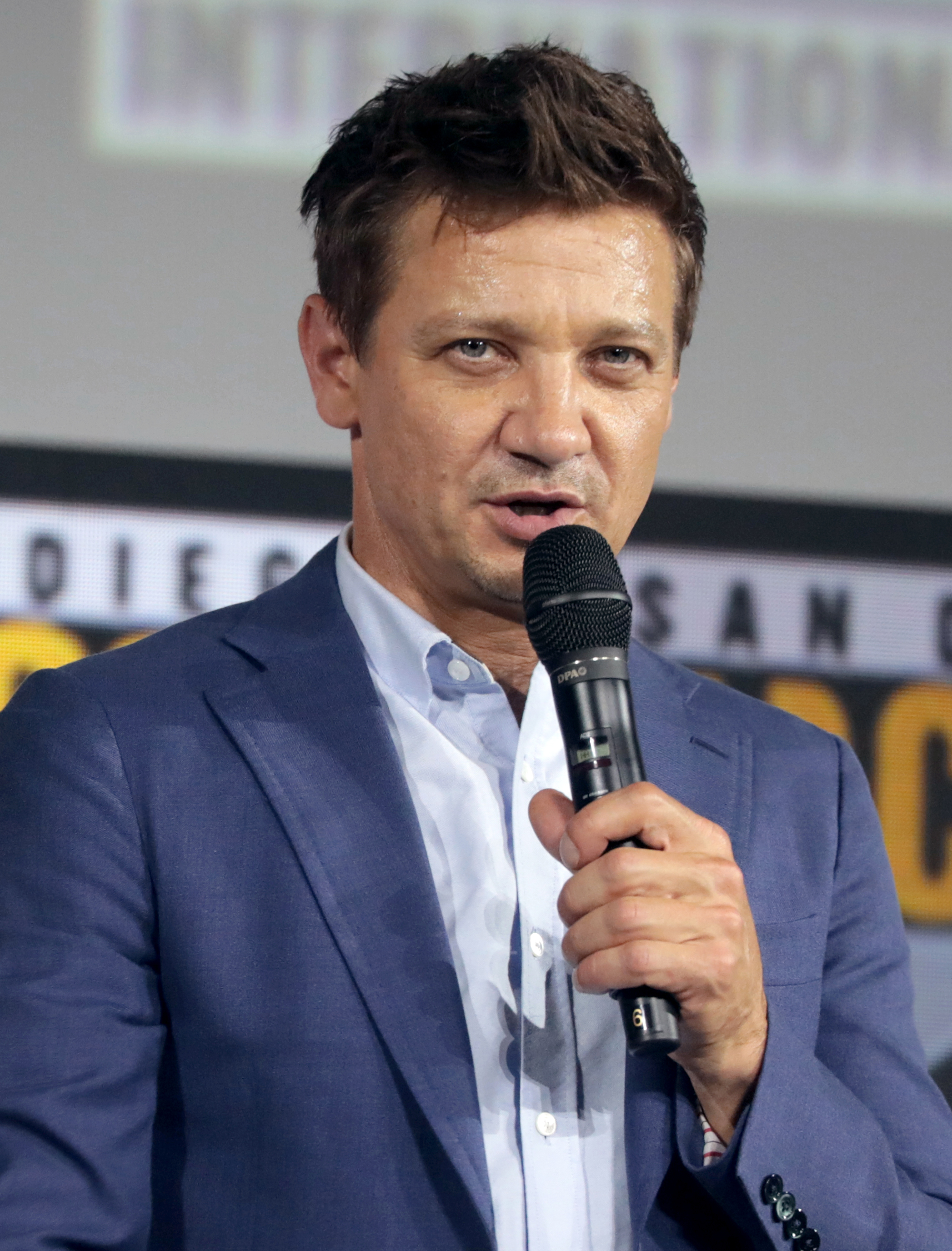
Jeremy Renner

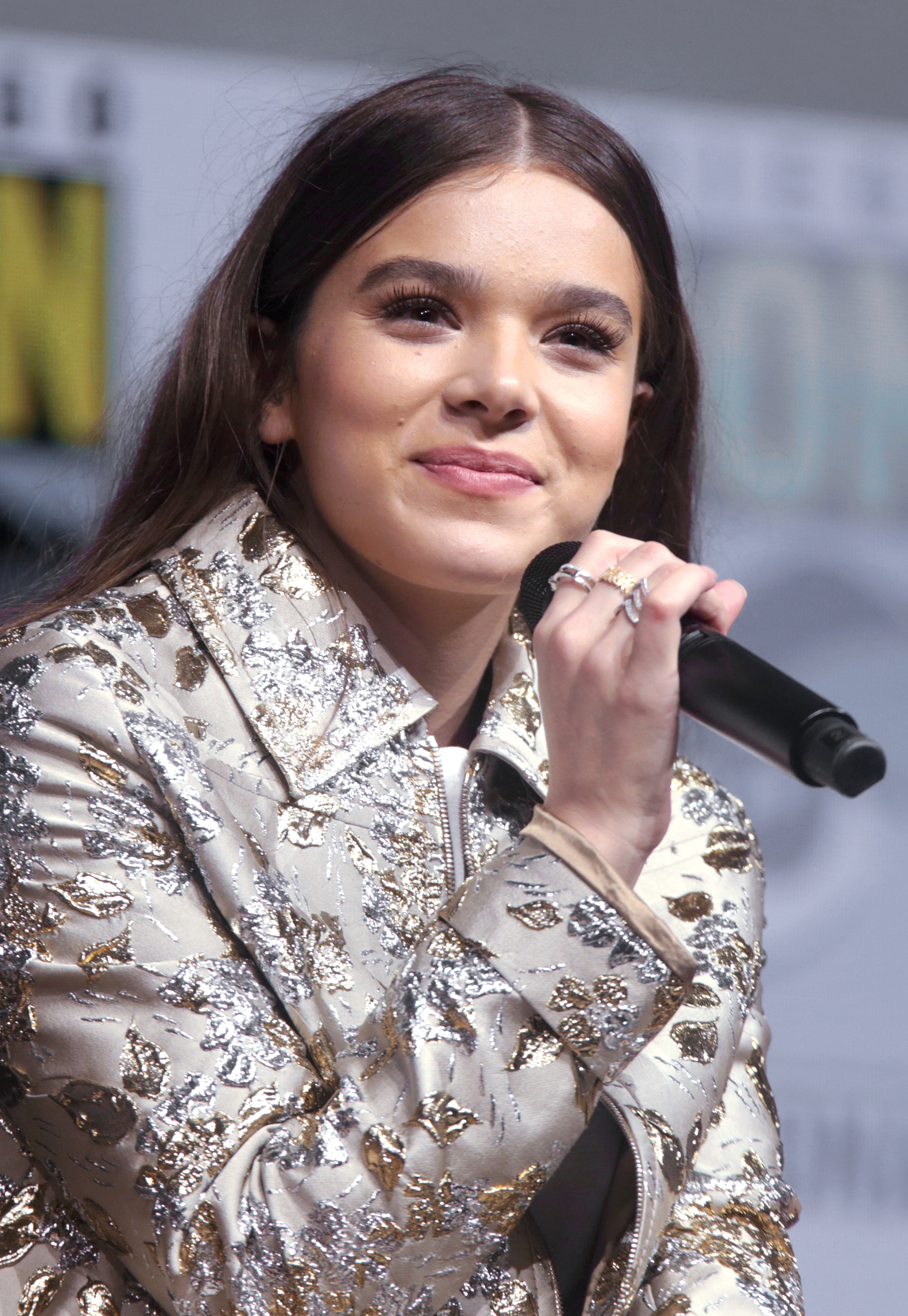
Hailee Steinfeld

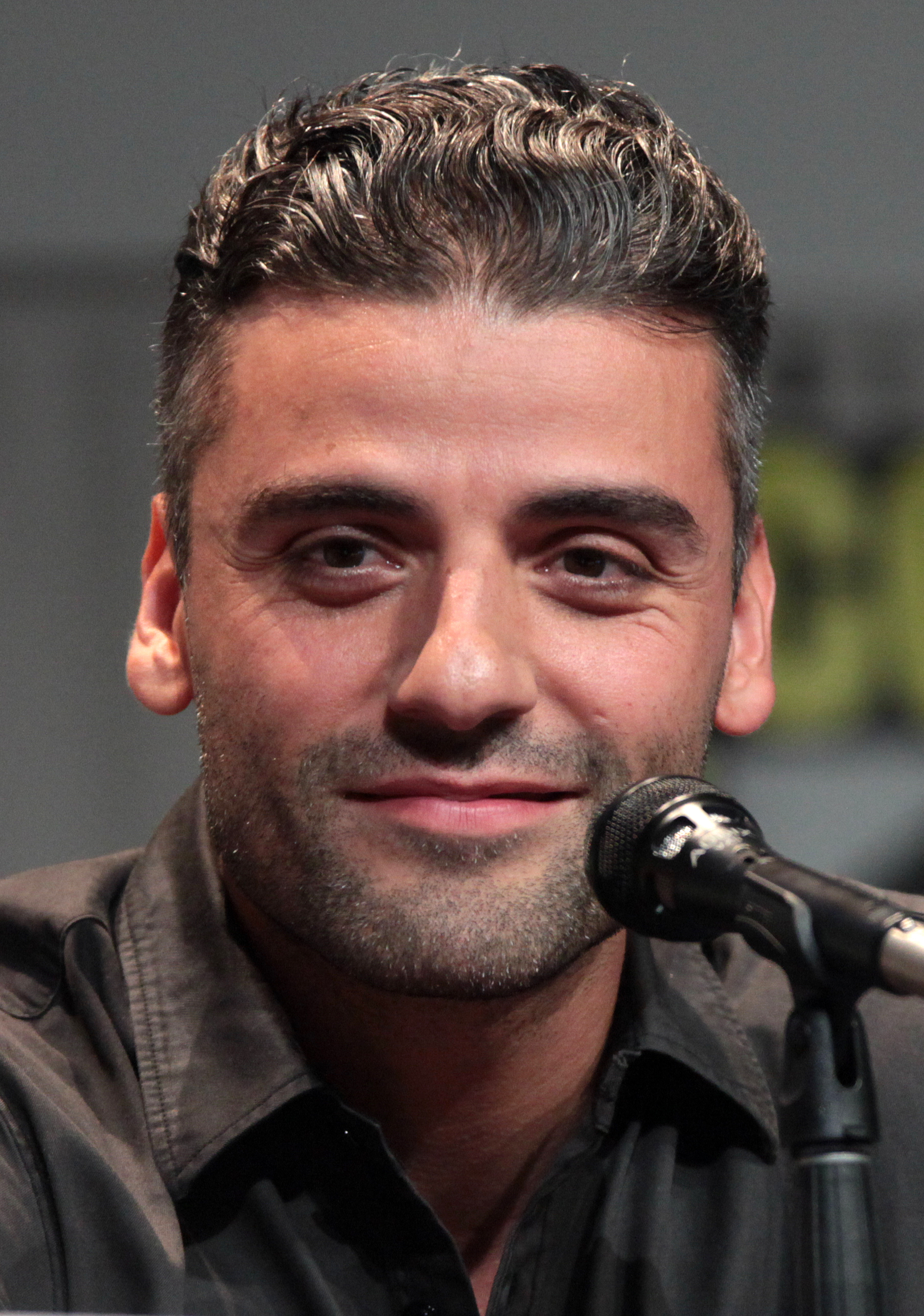
Oscar Isaac

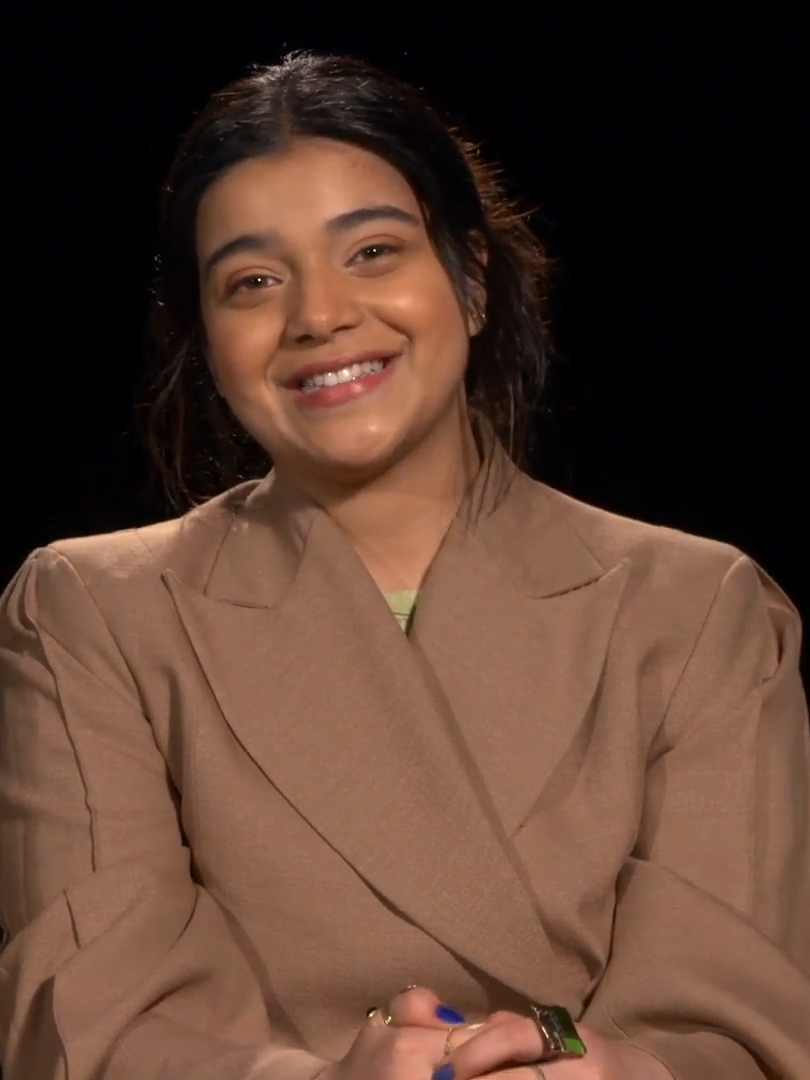
Iman Vellani

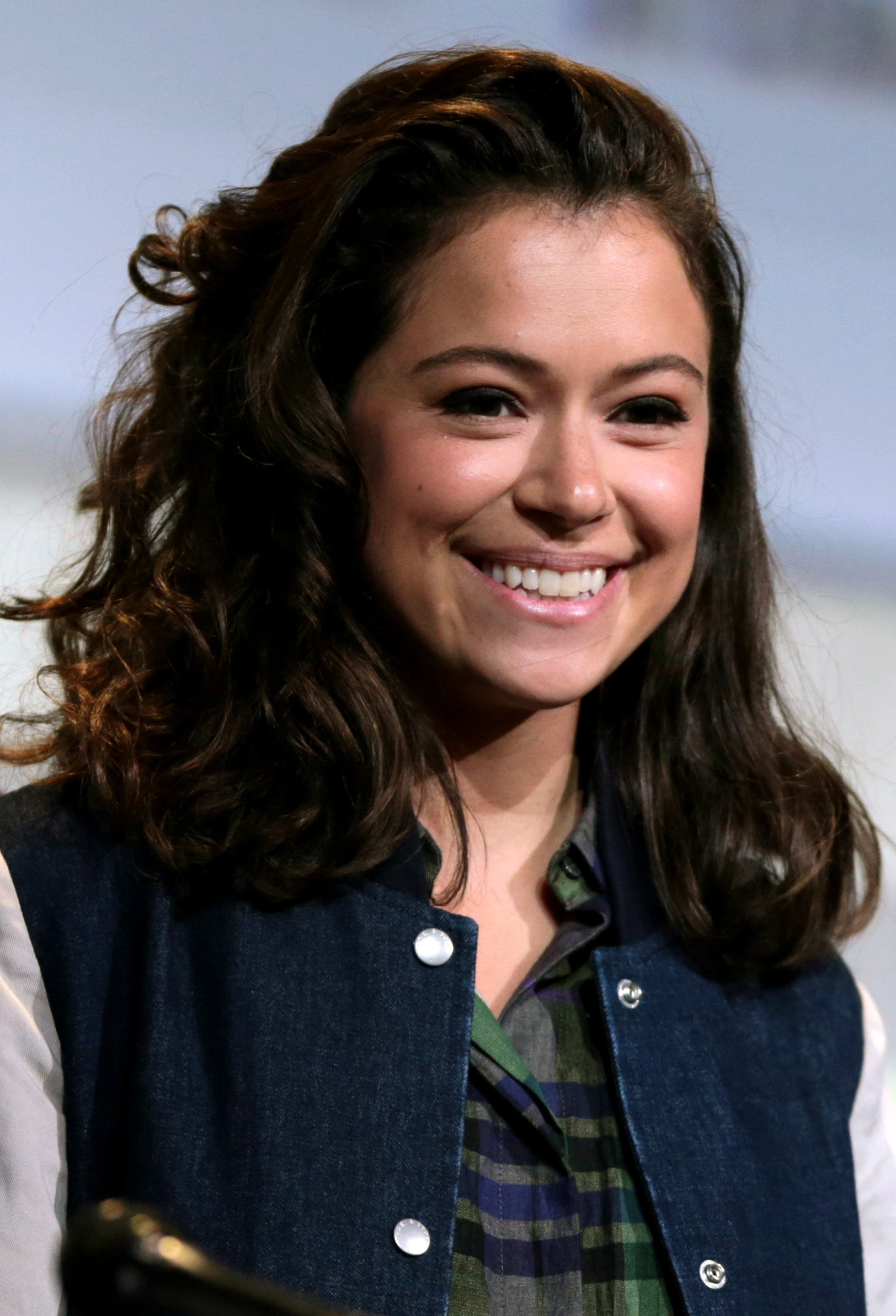
Tatiana Maslany

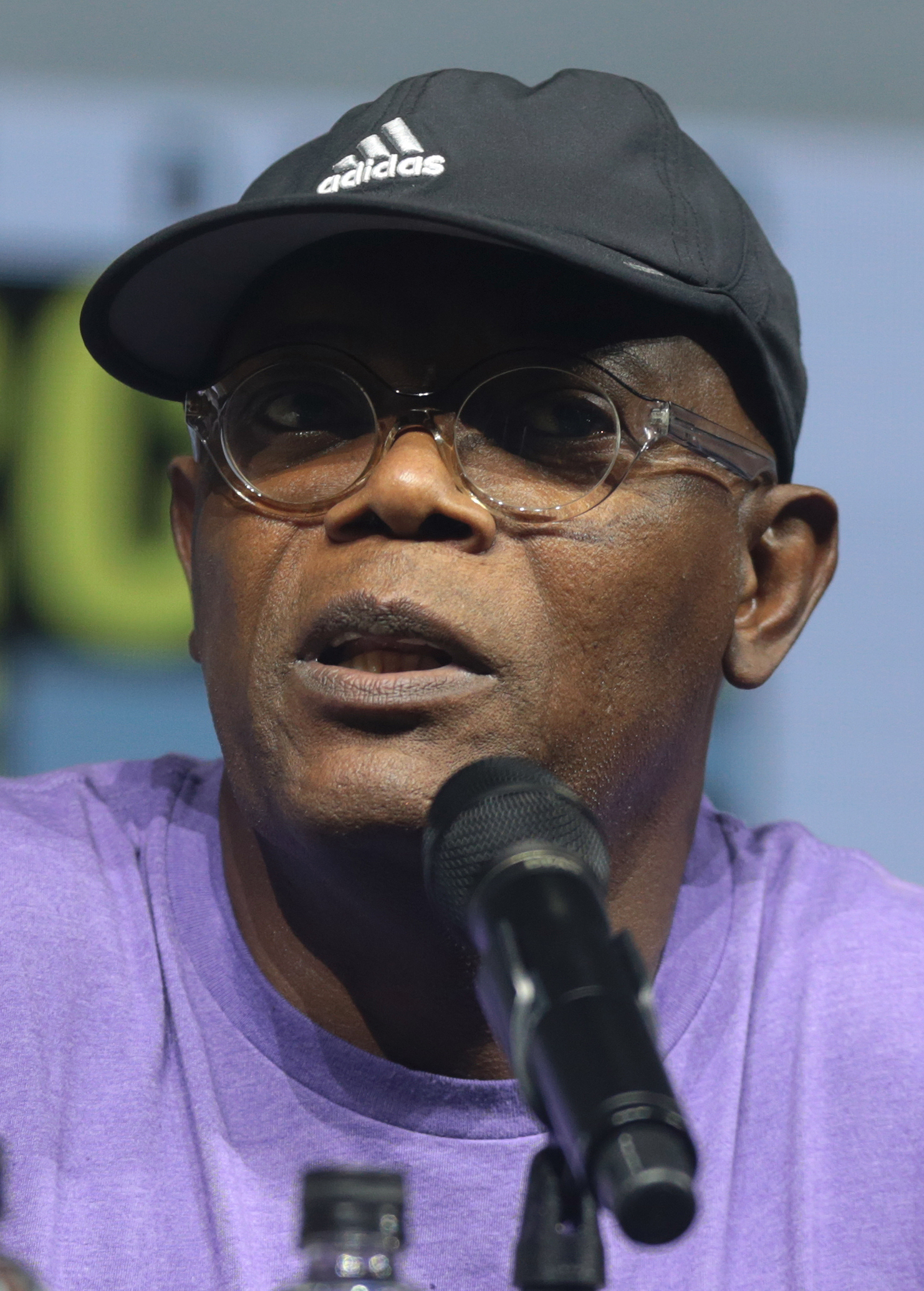
Samuel L. Jackson

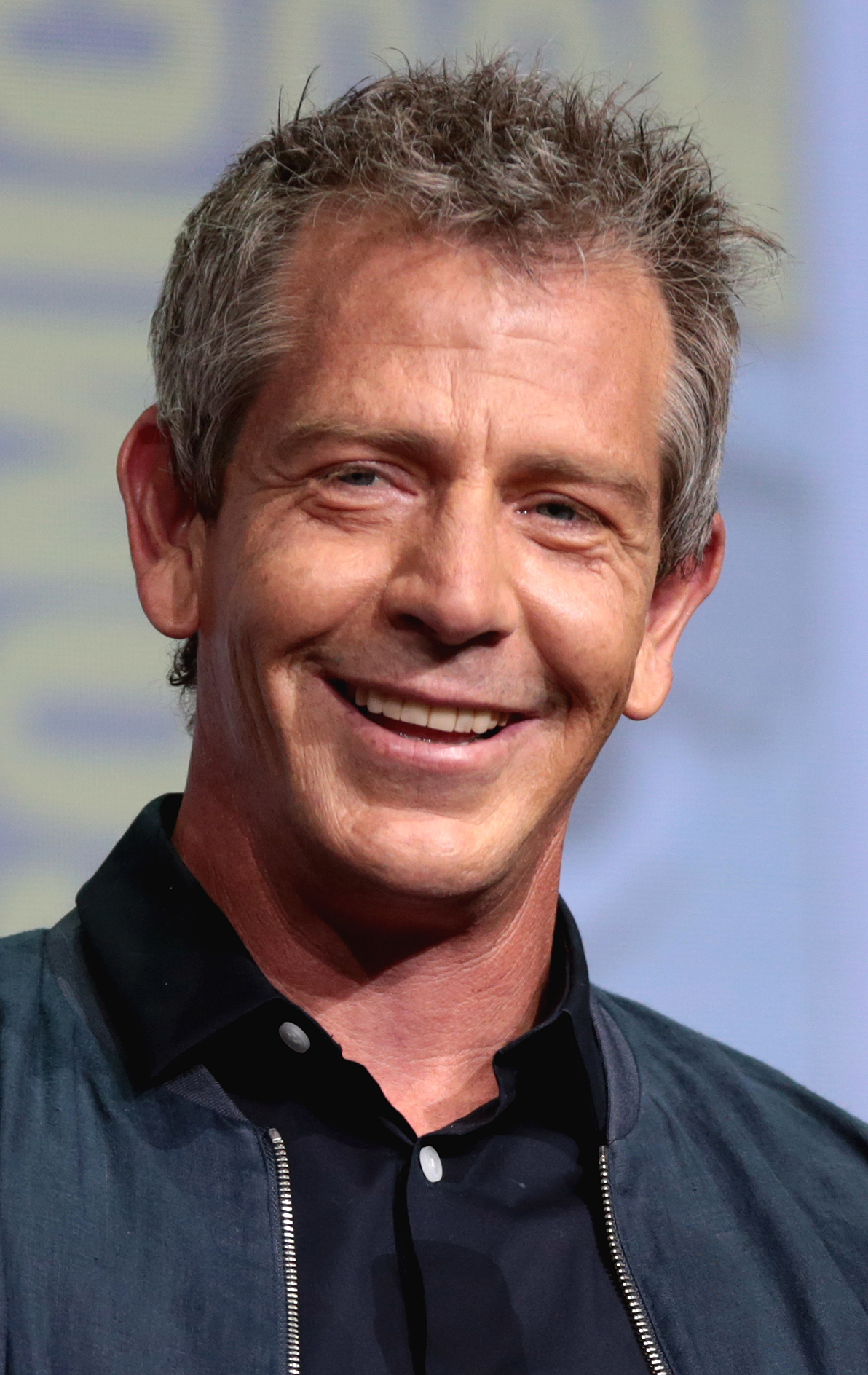
Ben Mendelsohn

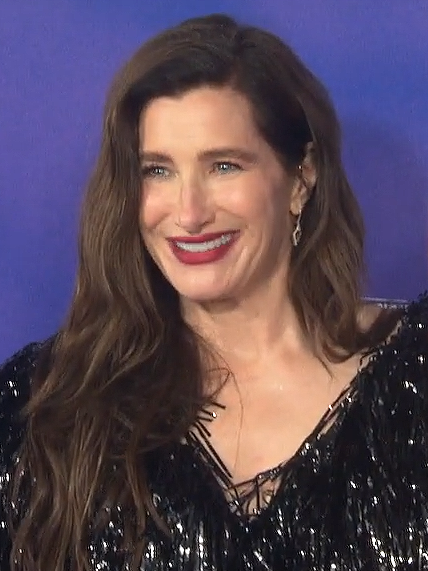
Kathryn Hahn

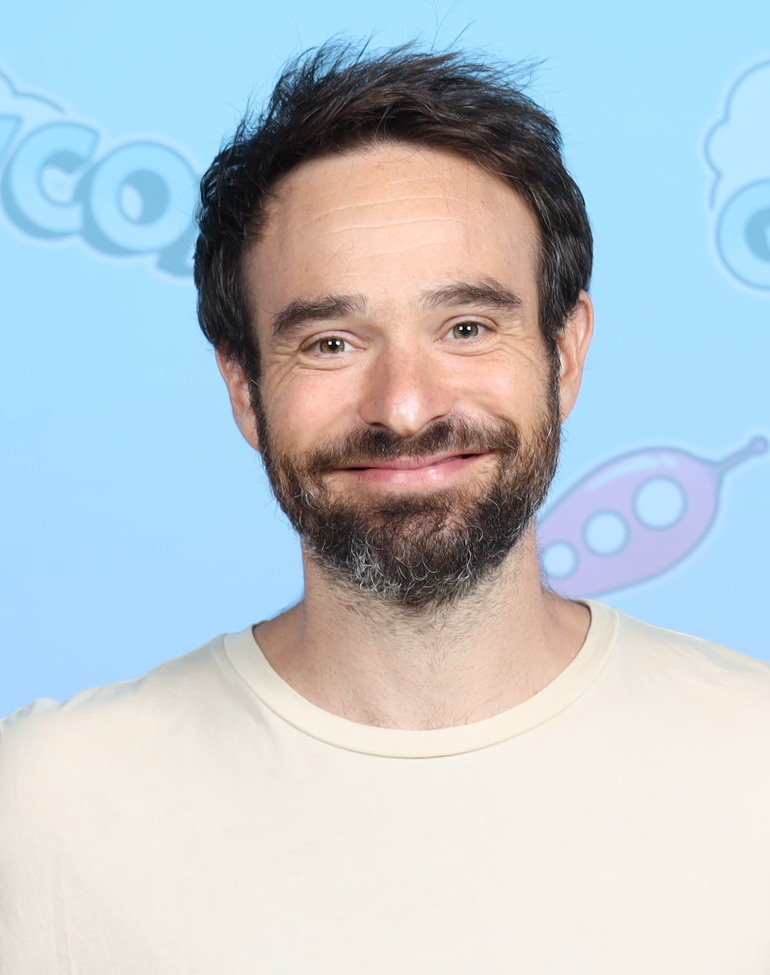
Charlie Cox

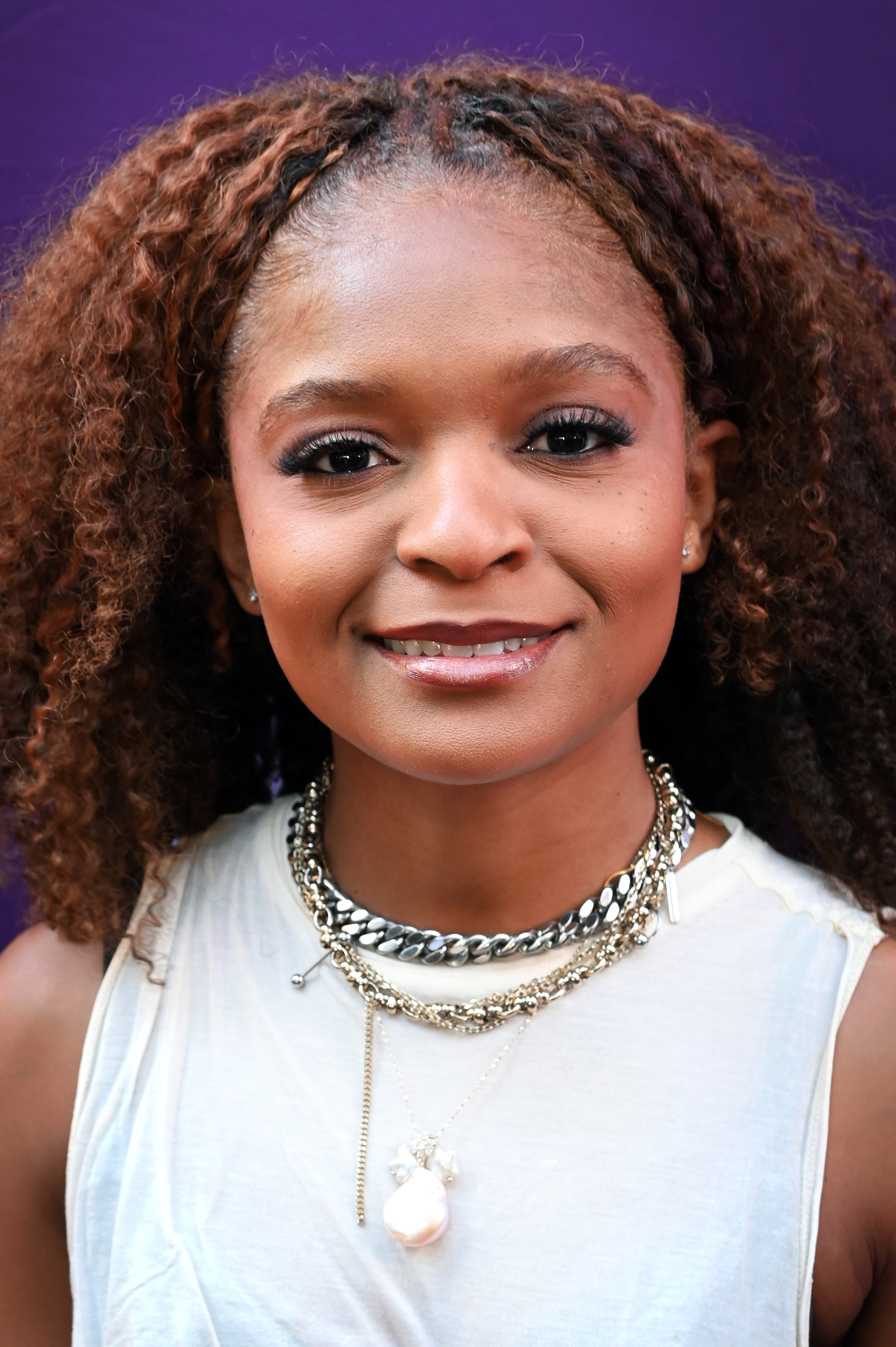
Dominique Thorne

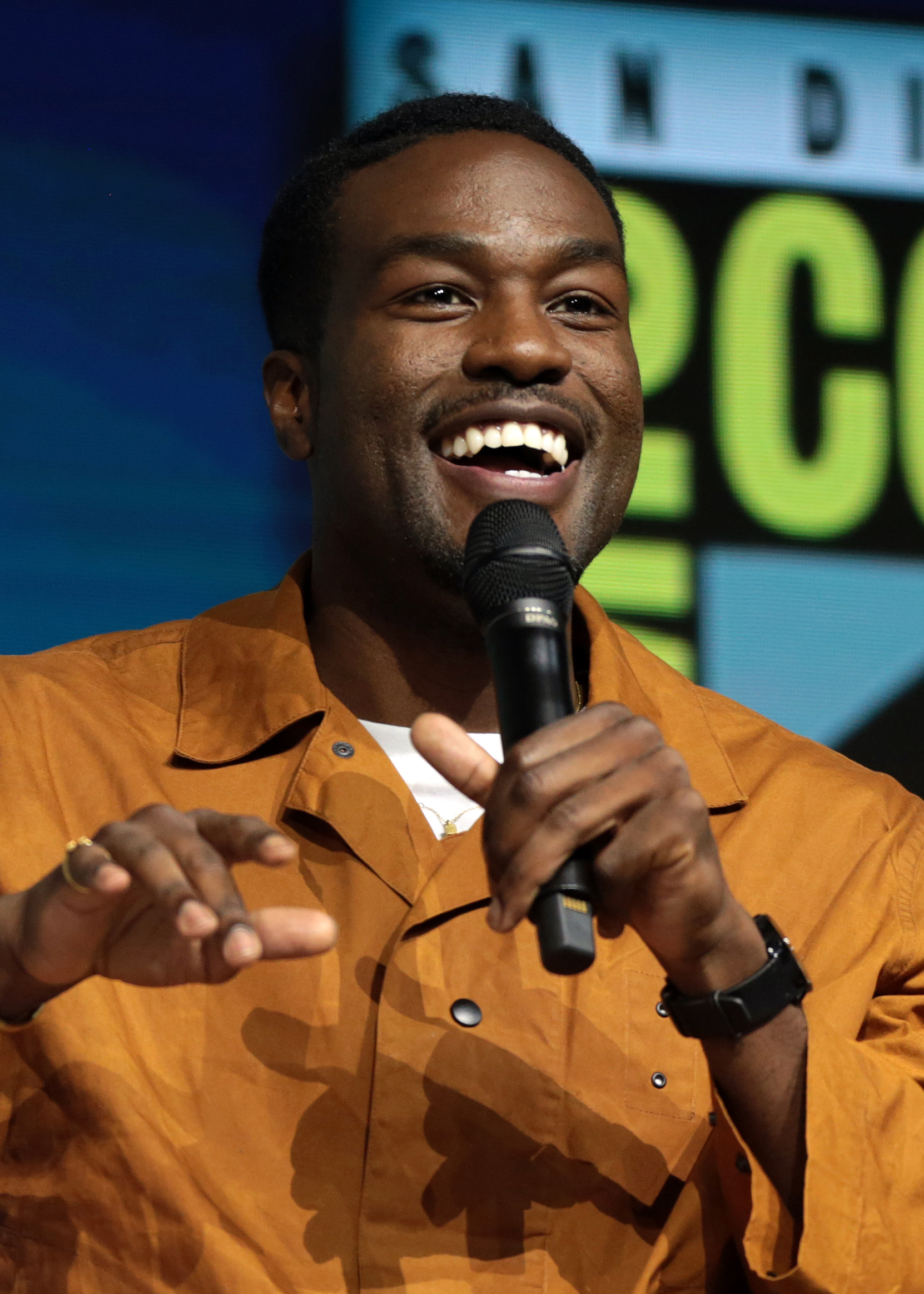
Yahya Abdul-Mateen II

Olsen, Bettany, Mackie, Stan, Renner, Steinfeld, Isaac, Vellani, Maslany, Jackson, Mendelsohn, Hahn, Thorne, and Abdul-Mateen headline miniseries, with Hiddleston, Wright, and Cox starring in multiple seasons.

The Marvel Cinematic Universe (MCU) is a media franchise and shared fictional universe that is the setting of superhero television series based on characters that appear in Marvel Comics publications. The MCU first expanded to television with series from Marvel Television that released from 2013 until 2020 on ABC, Netflix, Hulu, and Freeform. Marvel Studios—the production studio behind the films—began releasing series on Disney+ in 2021. These series feature greater interconnectivity with the feature films than those from Marvel Television, with many actors reprising their roles from the MCU films and the Marvel Television series. Animated series are produced by Marvel Studios Animation and beginning with Agatha All Along, live-action series are released under Marvel Studios' own Marvel Television label.

As part of Phase Four, WandaVision began streaming in 2021, and was followed by The Falcon and the Winter Soldier, the first season of Loki, the first season of the animated series What If...?, and Hawkeye, while Moon Knight, Ms. Marvel, and She-Hulk: Attorney at Law were released in 2022. Phase Five includes Secret Invasion, the second season of Loki, and the second season of What If...? in 2023; Echo, Agatha All Along, and the third season of What If...? in 2024; and the first season of the animated series Your Friendly Neighborhood Spider-Man, the first season of Daredevil: Born Again, and Ironheart in the first half of 2025. Phase Six includes the animated miniseries Eyes of Wakanda and the first season of the animated series Marvel Zombies in the second half of 2025; Wonder Man, the second season of Born Again, and VisionQuest in 2026; and the second season of Your Friendly Neighborhood Spider-Man and the third season of Born Again scheduled for 2027. Phases Four and Six also include Special Presentations.

Several MCU actors reprise their roles as the lead characters in their own series, including Elizabeth Olsen as Wanda Maximoff / Scarlet Witch and Paul Bettany as Vision in WandaVision, with Bettany later headlining VisionQuest; Anthony Mackie as Sam Wilson / Falcon and Sebastian Stan as Bucky Barnes / Winter Soldier in The Falcon and the Winter Soldier; Tom Hiddleston as the titular character in Loki; Jeremy Renner as Clint Barton / Hawkeye in Hawkeye; Samuel L. Jackson as Nick Fury and Ben Mendelsohn as Talos in Secret Invasion; Charlie Cox as Matt Murdock / Daredevil in Daredevil: Born Again, while also starring in She-Hulk: Attorney at Law and Echo; and Dominique Thorne as Riri Williams / Ironheart in Ironheart.

Other actors joining the franchise headline their own series as well. Hailee Steinfeld joins Renner in Hawkeye as Kate Bishop / Hawkeye; Oscar Isaac stars in a dual role as Marc Spector / Moon Knight and Steven Grant / Mr. Knight in Moon Knight; Iman Vellani portrays Kamala Khan / Ms. Marvel in Ms. Marvel; Tatiana Maslany stars as Jennifer Walters / She-Hulk in She-Hulk: Attorney at Law; Alaqua Cox is introduced as Maya Lopez / Echo in Hawkeye before headlining Echo; Kathryn Hahn is introduced as Agatha Harkness in WandaVision before starring in Agatha All Along; and Yahya Abdul-Mateen II portrays Simon Williams in Wonder Man.

In animated series, Jeffrey Wright narrates What If...? as the Watcher; Hudson Thames voices Peter Parker / Spider-Man in Your Friendly Neighborhood Spider-Man, after playing the role in What If...?; and Eyes of Wakanda features a different cast for each episode. Many actors reprise their roles in What If...?, including Olsen, Bettany, Mackie, Stan, Hiddleston, Jackson, Thorne, Steinfeld, Isaac, and Hahn. Charlie Cox reprises his role in Your Friendly Neighborhood Spider-Man, while Marvel Zombies features Olsen, Thorne, Steinfeld, Vellani, and Thames as part of the ensemble cast.

== Phase Four ==
List indicators
This section includes starring cast members, recurring characters, and notable guest stars, as defined by the FAQ.
- A dark grey cell indicates the character was not in the series or season.
- A ^{5} indicates the character reappears in a Phase Five series.
- A ^{6} indicates the character reappears in a Phase Six series.
- An ^{A} indicates an appearance through archival footage.
- A ^{C} indicates an uncredited cameo role.
- A ^{DS} indicates the character appears in a digital series.
- An ^{F} indicates the character appears in a film.
- An ^{MC} indicates a motion-capture-only role.
- An ^{MT} indicates the character appears in a Marvel Television series.
- An ^{OS} indicates the character appears in a One-Shot.
- An ^{S} indicates the actor was part of the starring cast for the series or season.
- An ^{SP} indicates the character appears in a Marvel Studios Special Presentation.
- A ^{V} indicates a voice-only role.
- A ^{Y} indicates a younger version of the character.

Character	2021					2022		
Character	WandaVision	The Falcon and the Winter Soldier	Loki season 1	What If...? season 1 (Note: All of the characters appearing in this animated series are alternate versions from those seen in the MCU proper.)	Hawkeye	Moon Knight	Ms. Marvel	She-Hulk: Attorney at Law
=== Introduced in The Infinity Saga ===
Ancient One				Tilda Swinton^{V}				
Ayo		Florence Kasumba^{S}						
Beth			Ashley Johnson^{A}					
Bruce Banner Hulk / Smart Hulk^{OS}			Mark Ruffalo^{A}^{V}	Mark Ruffalo^{V}				Mark Ruffalo^{S}
James "Bucky" Barnes Winter Soldier / White Wolf		Sebastian Stan^{S}		Sebastian Stan^{V}				
Clint Barton Hawkeye			Jeremy Renner^{A}	Jeremy Renner^{V}	Jeremy Renner^{S}			
Cooper Barton					Ben Sakamoto			
Laura Barton					Linda Cardellini^{S}			
Lila Barton					Ava Russo			
Nathaniel Barton					Cade Woodward			
Georges Batroc		Georges St-Pierre^{S}		Georges St-Pierre^{V}				
Emil Blonsky Abomination								Tim Roth^{S}
Carina				Ophelia Lovibond^{V}				
Sharon Carter Power Broker		Emily VanCamp^{S}		Emily VanCamp^{V}				
Phil Coulson^{DS} ^{MT} ^{OS}			Clark Gregg^{A}	Clark Gregg^{V}				
Carol Danvers Captain Marvel	Brie Larson^{A}^{V}			Alexandra Daniels^{V}			Brie Larson^{C}	
Drax the Destroyer^{SP}				Fred Tatasciore^{V}				
Timothy "Dum Dum" Dugan^{MT} ^{OS}				Neal McDonough^{V}				
Ego				Kurt Russell^{V}				
Abraham Erskine				Stanley Tucci^{V}				
Christine Everhart^{DS}				Leslie Bibb^{V}				
Fandral				Max Mittelman^{V}				
Jane Foster				Natalie Portman^{V}				
Frigga			Rene Russo^{A}	Josette Eales^{V}				
Nick Fury^{MT} ^{5}	Samuel L. Jackson^{A}^{V}			Samuel L. Jackson^{V}				
Gamora				Cynthia McWilliams^{V}				
Corvus Glaive				Fred Tatasciore^{V}				
Grandmaster				Jeff Goldblum^{V}				
Maria Hill^{MT} ^{5}				Cobie Smulders^{V}				
Harold "Happy" Hogan				Jon Favreau^{V}				
Hogun				David Chen^{V}				
Howard the Duck				Seth Green^{V}				
J.A.R.V.I.S.				Paul Bettany^{V}				
Korath				Djimon Hounsou^{V}				
Ulysses Klaue				Andy Serkis^{V}				
Korg				Taika Waititi^{V}				
Kurt				David Dastmalchian^{V}				
Scott Lang Ant-Man^{DS}				Paul Rudd^{V}				
Darcy Lewis	Kat Dennings^{S}			Kat Dennings^{V}				
Loki^{5}			Tom Hiddleston^{S} (Note: This is an alternate version of the character from a branched reality created in Avengers: Endgame (2019).)	Tom Hiddleston^{V}				
Ebony Maw				Tom Vaughan-Lawlor^{V}				
Pietro Maximoff	Gabriel Gurevich^{Y}							
Wanda Maximoff Scarlet Witch	Elizabeth Olsen^{S} Michaela Russell^{Y}							
Proxima Midnight				Carrie Coon^{V}				
Nebula^{SP}				Karen Gillan^{V}				
N'Jadaka / Erik "Killmonger" Stevens				Michael B. Jordan^{V}				
Nomble		Janeshia Adams-Ginyard						
Kraglin Obfonteri^{SP}				Sean Gunn^{V}				
Odin			Anthony Hopkins^{A}					
Okoye				Danai Gurira^{V}				
Christine Palmer				Rachel McAdams^{V}				
Peter Parker Spider-Man^{DS}				Hudson Thames^{V}				
Virginia "Pepper" Potts				Beth Hoyt^{V}				
Peter Quill Star-Lord^{SP}				Brian T. Delaney^{V}				
Maria Rambeau	Lashana Lynch^{A}^{V}							
Monica Rambeau / "Geraldine"	Teyonah Parris^{S} Akira Akbar^{A}^{V}^{Y}							
Ramonda				Angela Bassett^{V}				
James "Rhodey" Rhodes War Machine^{5}		Don Cheadle^{S}		Don Cheadle^{V}				
Steve Rogers Captain America		Chris Evans^{A}^{V}	Chris Evans^{A}	Josh Keaton^{V}				
Jack Rollins				Uncredited actor^{V}				
Natasha Romanoff Black Widow^{5}			Scarlett Johansson^{A}	Lake Bell^{V}	Scarlett Johansson^{A}			
Betty Ross				Stephanie Panisello^{V}				
Thaddeus Ross				Mike McGill^{V}				
Brock Rumlow				Frank Grillo^{V}				
Johann Schmidt Red Skull				Ross Marquand^{V}				
Shuri				Ozioma Akagha^{V}				
Sif^{MT}			Jaimie Alexander^{C}	Jaimie Alexander^{V}				
Obadiah Stane				Kiff VandenHeuvel^{V}				
Howard Stark^{MT} ^{OS}				Dominic Cooper^{V}				
Maria Stark		Hope Davis^{A}						
Tony Stark Iron Man			Robert Downey Jr.^{A}	Mick Wingert^{V}				
Stephen Strange				Benedict Cumberbatch^{V}				
Surtur				Clancy Brown^{V}				
T'Chaka				John Kani^{V}				
T'Challa Black Panther				Chadwick Boseman^{V}				
Thanos			Josh Brolin^{A}	Josh Brolin^{V}				
Thor^{OS}			Chris Hemsworth^{A}	Chris Hemsworth^{V}				
Taneleer Tivan The Collector				Benicio del Toro^{V}				
Topaz				Rachel House^{V}				
Yondu Udonta^{SP}				Michael Rooker^{V}				
Ultron				Ross Marquand^{V}				
Hope van Dyne Wasp				Evangeline Lilly^{V}				
Vision / The Vision^{6}	Paul Bettany^{S}			Paul Bettany^{V}				
Volstagg				Fred Tatasciore^{V}				
Sam Wilson Falcon / Captain America		Anthony Mackie^{S}						
Wong				Benedict Wong^{V}				Benedict Wong^{S}
Jimmy Woo	Randall Park^{S}							
Yama		Zola Williams						
Helmut Zemo		Daniel Brühl^{S}						
Arnim Zola				Toby Jones^{V}				
=== Introduced in Marvel One-Shots ===
John Flynn				Bradley Whitford^{V}				
=== Introduced in Marvel Television series ===
Wilson Fisk Kingpin^{5} ^{6}					Vincent D'Onofrio^{S}			
Matt Murdock Daredevil^{5} ^{6} ^{F}								Charlie Cox^{S}
=== Introduced in Phase Four films ===
Yelena Belova					Florence Pugh^{S}			
P. Cleary							Arian Moayed^{S}	
=== Introduced in WandaVision ===
Ralph Bohner / "Pietro Maximoff"^{5}	Evan Peters^{S}							
John Collins / "Herb"^{5}	David Payton							
Commercial man	Ithamar Enriquez							
Commercial woman	Victoria Blade							
Sharon Davis / "Mrs. Hart"^{5}	Debra Jo Rupp^{S}							
Todd Davis / "Arthur Hart"	Fred Melamed^{S}							
"Dennis"^{5}	Amos Glick							
Agatha Harkness / "Agnes"^{5}	Kathryn Hahn^{S}							
Evanora Harkness^{5}	Kate Forbes							
Tyler Hayward	Josh Stamberg							
Isabel Matsueda / "Beverly"	Jolene Purdy							
Billy Maximoff^{5}^{6} ^{F}	Julian Hilliard							
Iryna Maximoff	Ilana Kohanchi							
Olek Maximoff	Daniyar							
Tommy Maximoff^{6} ^{F}	Jett Klyne							
Monti	Alan Heckner							
Harold Proctor / "Phil Jones"^{5}	David Lengel							
Sarah Proctor / "Dottie Jones"^{5}	Emma Caulfield Ford							
Rodriguez	Selena Anduze							
Sheriff	Brian Brightman							
Abilash Tandon / "Norm"^{5}	Asif Ali							
=== Introduced in The Falcon and the Winter Soldier ===
Eli Bradley		Elijah Richardson						
Isaiah Bradley^{F}		Carl Lumbly						
Valentina Allegra de Fontaine^{F}		Julia Louis-Dreyfus^{S}						
DeeDee		Indya Bussey						
Diego		Tyler Dean Flores						
Dovich		Desmond Chiam						
Gigi		Dani Deetté						
Lemar Hoskins Battlestar		Clé Bennett						
Lennox		Renes Rivera						
Donya Madani		Veronica Falcón						
Karli Morgenthau		Erin Kellyman^{S}						
Wilfred Nagel		Olli Haaskivi						
Nico		Noah Mills						
Christina Raynor		Amy Aquino						
Rudy		Neal Kodinsky						
Joaquin Torres^{F}		Danny Ramirez^{S}						
John Walker Captain America / U.S. Agent^{F}		Wyatt Russell^{S}						
Olivia Walker^{F}		Gabrielle Byndloss						
Sarah Wilson		Adepero Oduye^{S}						
=== Introduced in Loki season 1 ===
Boastful Loki			DeObia Oparei^{S}					
Casey / Hunter K-5E^{5} ^{F}			Eugene Cordero^{S}					
Classic Loki			Richard E. Grant^{S}					
He Who Remains^{5}			Jonathan Majors^{S}					
Hunter B-15^{5} ^{F}			Wunmi Mosaku^{S}					
Hunter C-20			Sasha Lane^{S}					
Hunter D-90^{5}			Neil Ellice					
Kid Loki			Jack Veal^{S}					
Miss Minutes^{5} ^{F}			Tara Strong^{S} ^{V}					
Mobius M. Mobius^{5} ^{F}			Owen Wilson^{S}					
President Loki			Tom Hiddleston					
Ravonna Renslayer^{5}			Gugu Mbatha-Raw^{S}					
Sylvie^{5}			Sophia Di Martino^{S}					
Throg			Chris Hemsworth^{C}^{V}					
Time-Keepers			Jonathan Majors^{V}					
Rebecca Tourminet			Gugu Mbatha-Raw					
=== Introduced in What If...? season 1 ===
Peggy Carter Captain Carter^{5}				Hayley Atwell^{V}				
O'Bengh				Ike Amadi^{V}				
Hank Pym Yellowjacket				Michael Douglas^{V}				
Steve Rogers Hydra Stomper^{5}				Josh Keaton^{V}				
Stephen Strange Doctor Strange Supreme^{5}				Benedict Cumberbatch^{V}				
Star-Lord T'Challa				Chadwick Boseman^{V}				
Watcher^{5}				Jeffrey Wright^{S} ^{V}				
=== Introduced in Hawkeye ===
Ivan Banionis					Aleks Paunovic^{S}			
Derek Bishop					Brian d'Arcy James^{S}			
Eleanor Bishop					Vera Farmiga^{S}			
Kate Bishop^{F}					Hailee Steinfeld^{S} Clara Stack^{Y}			
Caudle					Ivan Mbakop			
Wendy Conrad					Adetinpo Thomas			
Armand Duquesne III					Simon Callow^{S}			
Jack Duquesne^{5} ^{6}					Tony Dalton^{S}			
Enrique					Carlos Navarro			
Grills					Clayton English			
Kazimierz "Kazi" Kazimierczak					Fra Fee^{S}			
Maya Lopez^{5}					Alaqua Cox^{S} Darnell Besaw^{Y}			
William Lopez^{5}					Zahn McClarnon^{S}			
Tomas					Piotr Adamczyk^{S}			
Missy					Adelle Drahos			
Orville					Robert-Walker Branchaud			
=== Introduced in Moon Knight ===
Ammit						Sofia Danu^{S} Saba Mubarak^{S} ^{V}		
Crawley						Shaun Scott		
Layla El-Faouly Scarlet Scarab						May Calamawy^{S}		
Billy Fitzgerald						David Ganly^{S}		
Arthur Harrow						Ethan Hawke^{S}		
Horus's avatar						Declan Hannigan		
Isis's avatar						Nagisa Morimoto		
Bobbi Kennedy						Ann Akinjirin^{S}		
Khonshu						Karim El-Hakim^{S} F. Murray Abraham^{S} ^{V}		
Anton Mogart						Gaspard Ulliel^{S}		
Selim Osiris's avatar						Khalid Abdalla^{S}		
Elias Spector						Rey Lucas^{S}		
Marc Spector Moon Knight Steven Grant Mr. Knight Jake Lockley						Oscar Isaac^{S}		
Randall Spector						Claudio Fabian Contreras		
Wendy Spector						Fernanda Andrade^{S}		
Taweret						Antonia Salib^{S}		
Tefnut's avatar						Hayley Konadu		
Yatzil Hathor's avatar						Díana Bermudez		
=== Introduced in Ms. Marvel ===
Aisha							Mehwish Hayat^{S}	
Sheikh Abdullah							Laith Nakli^{S}	
Nakia Bahadir							Yasmeen Fletcher^{S}	
Bruno Carrelli							Matt Lintz^{S}	
Sadie Deever							Alysia Reiner^{S}	
Fariha							Adaku Ononogbo^{S}	
Hasan							Fawad Khan^{S}	
Tyesha Hillman							Travina Springer^{S}	
Kamran							Rish Shah^{S}	
Kareem Red Dagger							Aramis Knight^{S}	
Aamir Khan^{F}							Saagar Shaikh^{S}	
Kamala Khan Ms. Marvel^{F}							Iman Vellani^{S}	
Muneeba Khan^{F}							Zenobia Shroff^{S}	
Yusuf Khan^{5} ^{F}							Mohan Kapur^{S}	
Najaf							Azhar Usman^{S}	
Najma							Nimra Bucha^{S}	
Sana							Samina Ahmad^{S}	
Waleed							Farhan Akhtar^{S}	
Zoe Zimmer							Laurel Marsden^{S}	
=== Introduced in She-Hulk: Attorney at Law ===
El Águila								Joseph Castillo-Midyett
Donny Blaze								Rhys Coiro^{S}
Mallory Book								Renée Elise Goldsberry^{S}
Dennis Bukowski								Drew Matthews^{S}
Bulldozer								Tennison Barry III
Craig Hollis Mister Immortal								David Pasquesi
Holden Holliway								Steve Coulter^{S}
Luke Jacobson								Griffin Matthews^{S}
K.E.V.I.N.								Brian T. Delaney^{V}^{C}
Madisynn King								Patty Guggenheim
Lulu								Patti Harrison^{S}
Man-Bull								Nate Hurd
Mary MacPherran Titania								Jameela Jamil^{S}
Josh Miller								Trevor Salter
Eugene Patilio Leap-Frog								Brandon Stanley^{S}
Todd Phelps HulkKing								Jon Bass^{S}
Piledriver								Kyle Murillo
Porcupine								Jordan Aaron Ford
Augustus "Pug" Pugliese								Josh Segarra^{S}
Nikki Ramos								Ginger Gonzaga^{S}
Saracen								Terrence Clowe
Skaar								Wil Deusner^{MC}
Megan Thee Stallion								Herself^{S}
Thunderball								Justin Eaton
Elaine Walters								Tess Malis Kincaid^{S}
Jennifer Walters She-Hulk								Tatiana Maslany^{S}
Morris Walters								Mark Linn-Baker^{S}
Wrecker								Nick Gomez

== Phase Five ==
List indicators
This section includes starring cast members, recurring characters, and notable guest stars, as defined by the FAQ.
- A dark grey cell indicates the character was not in the series or season.
- An ^{A} indicates an appearance through archival footage.
- A ^{DS} indicates the character appears in a digital series.
- An ^{F} indicates the character appears in a film.
- An ^{MT} indicates the character appears in a Marvel Television series.
- An ^{OS} indicates the character appears in a One-Shot.
- An ^{S} indicates the actor was part of the starring cast for the series or season.
- An ^{SP} indicates the character appears in a Marvel Studios Special Presentation.
- A ^{Y} indicates a younger version of the character.

Character	2023			2024			2025		
Character	Secret Invasion	Loki season 2	What If...? season 2	Echo	Agatha All Along	What If...? season 3	Your Friendly Neighborhood Spider-Man season 1	Daredevil: Born Again season 1	Ironheart
=== Introduced in The Infinity Saga ===
Bruce Banner Hulk / Smart Hulk^{OS}			Mark Ruffalo^{V}			Mark Ruffalo^{V}			
Clint Barton Hawkeye			Jeremy Renner^{V}	Jeremy Renner^{A}					
James "Bucky" Barnes Winter Soldier / White Wolf			Sebastian Stan^{V}			Sebastian Stan^{V}			
Quentin Beck Mysterio						Alejandro Saab^{V}			
Beerbot 5000						Hamish Parkinson^{V}			
Sonny Burch						Walton Goggins^{V}			
Carina						Kari Wahlgren^{V}			
Peggy Carter^{MT} ^{OS}			Hayley Atwell^{V}						
Sharon Carter Power Broker						Emily VanCamp^{V}			
Phil Coulson^{DS} ^{MT} ^{OS}						Clark Gregg^{V}			
Carol Danvers Captain Marvel						Alexandra Daniels^{V}			
Drax the Destroyer^{SP}			Fred Tatasciore^{V}						
Ego			Kurt Russell^{V}						
Abraham Erskine			Stanley Tucci^{V}						
Bill Foster Goliath			Laurence Fishburne^{V}			Laurence Fishburne^{V}			
Nick Fury^{MT}	Samuel L. Jackson^{S}		Samuel L. Jackson^{V}			Samuel L. Jackson^{V}			
G'iah	Emilia Clarke^{S}								
Gamora			Cynthia McWilliams^{V}						
Mac Gargan Scorpion							Jonathan Medina^{V}		
Grandmaster^{OS}			Jeff Goldblum^{V}			Matt Friend^{V}			
Groot^{SP}			Fred Tatasciore^{V}			Fred Tatasciore^{V}			
Justin Hammer^{OS}			Sam Rockwell^{V}						
Heimdall			Idris Elba^{V}						
Hela			Cate Blanchett^{V} Liv Zamora^{Y}						
Maria Hill^{MT}	Cobie Smulders		Cobie Smulders^{V}						
Howard the Duck			Seth Green^{V}			Seth Green^{V}			
Kaecilius						Jared Butler^{V}			
Vasily Karpov			Gene Farber^{V}			Gene Farber^{V}			
Korg			Taika Waititi^{V}			Taika Waititi^{V}			
Scott Lang Ant-Man^{DS}			Paul Rudd^{V}						
Laufey						Andrew Morgado^{V}			
Darcy Lewis			Kat Dennings^{V}			Kat Dennings^{V}			
Loki		Tom Hiddleston^{S}	Tom Hiddleston^{V}			Tom Hiddleston^{V}			
Malekith						Steven French^{V}			
Mar-Vell / Wendy Lawson			Keri Tombazian^{V}						
Ebony Maw						Tom Vaughan-Lawlor^{V}			
Nakia						Brittany Adebumola^{V}			
Nebula^{SP}			Karen Gillan^{V}			Karen Gillan^{V}			
Odin			Jeff Bergman^{V}						
Okoye						Kenna Ramsey^{V}			
May Parker							Kari Wahlgren^{S}^{V}		
Peter Parker Spider-Man^{DS}							Hudson Thames^{S}^{V}		
Hank Pym Ant-Man			Michael Douglas^{V}						
Peter Quill^{SP}			Mace Montgomery Miskel^{V}						
Irani Rael Nova Prime			Julianne Grossman^{V}						
Monica Rambeau						Teyonah Parris^{V}			
James "Rhodey" Rhodes	Don Cheadle^{S}								
Steve Rogers Captain America			Josh Keaton^{V}						
Natasha Romanoff Black Widow			Lake Bell^{V}						
Everett K. Ross	Martin Freeman								
Thaddeus Ross							Travis Willingham^{V}		
Brock Rumlow			Frank Grillo^{V}						
Garthan Saal			Peter Serafinowicz^{V}						
Soren	Charlotte Baker Kate Braithwaite								
Obadiah Stane						Kiff VandenHeuvel^{V}			
Howard Stark^{MT} ^{OS}			John Slattery^{V}			Dominic Cooper^{V}			
Tony Stark Iron Man			Mick Wingert^{V}				Mick Wingert^{V}		
Stephen Strange Doctor Strange							Robin Atkin Downes^{V}		
Surtur			Clancy Brown^{V}						
T'Chaka			Atandwa Kani^{V}						
Talos	Ben Mendelsohn^{S}								
Thanos			Josh Brolin^{V}			Josh Brolin^{V}			
Thor^{OS}			Chris Hemsworth^{V}			Chris Hemsworth^{V}			
Topaz			Rachel House^{V}			Rachel House^{V}			
Yondu Udonta^{SP}			Michael Rooker^{V}			Michael Rooker^{V}			
Ultron						Ross Marquand^{V}			
Valkyrie			Tessa Thompson^{V}			Tessa Thompson^{V}			
Hope van Dyne Wasp			Madeleine McGraw^{V}						
Vision^{6}					Paul Bettany^{V}				
Wilkes									Jim Rash^{S}
Sam Wilson Captain America						Anthony Mackie^{V}			
Wong						David Chen^{V}			
Yon-Rogg			Jude Law^{V}						
=== Introduced in Marvel Television series ===
Frank Castle Punisher^{F} ^{SP}								Jon Bernthal^{S}	
Big Donovan							Leilani Barrett^{V}		
Bill Fisk				Richie Palmer Sr.^{V}					
Marlene Fisk				Mary Louise Gemmill^{V}					
Vanessa Fisk^{6}								Ayelet Zurer^{S}	
Wilson Fisk Kingpin^{6}				Vincent D'Onofrio^{S}				Vincent D'Onofrio^{S}	
Edwin Jarvis						James D'Arcy^{V}			
Josie^{6}								Susan Varon	
Nico Minoru							Grace Song^{S}^{V}		
Matt Murdock Daredevil^{6} ^{F}				Charlie Cox^{S}			Charlie Cox^{S}^{V}	Charlie Cox^{S} Eli D. Goss^{Y}	
Franklin "Foggy" Nelson								Elden Henson^{S}	
Karen Page^{6} ^{SP}								Deborah Ann Woll^{S}	
Benjamin "Dex" Poindexter Bullseye^{6}								Wilson Bethel^{S}	
=== Introduced in Phase Four ===
Arishem						David Kaye^{V}			
Kate Bishop^{F}						Hailee Steinfeld^{V}			
Ralph Bohner					Evan Peters^{S}				
Bulldozer							Ettore Ewen^{V}		
Peggy Carter Captain Carter			Hayley Atwell^{V}			Hayley Atwell^{V}			
Casey^{F}		Eugene Cordero^{S}							
John Collins / "Herb Feltman"					David Payton				
Sharon Davis					Debra Jo Rupp^{S}				
Dreykov						Piotr Michael^{V}			
Jack Duquesne Swordsman^{6}								Tony Dalton^{S}	
Agatha Harkness / "Agnes O'Connor"					Kathryn Hahn^{S}	Kathryn Hahn^{V}			
Evanora Harkness					Kate Forbes				
He Who Remains		Jonathan Majors^{S}							
Hunter B-15^{F}		Wunmi Mosaku^{S}							
Hunter D-90		Neil Ellice^{S}							
Kazimierz "Kazi" Kazimierczak				Fra Fee^{A}					
Yusuf Khan^{F}								Mohan Kapur^{S}	
Kingo						Kumail Nanjiani^{V}			
Maya Lopez Echo				Alaqua Cox^{S} Darnell Besaw^{Y}					
William Lopez				Zahn McClarnon^{S}					
Rick Mason	O-T Fagbenle								
Billy Maximoff / William Kaplan Wiccan^{F}^{6}					Joe Locke^{S}				
Miss Minutes^{F}		Tara Strong^{S}^{V}							
Mobius M. Mobius^{F}		Owen Wilson^{S}							
Harold Proctor / "Phil Jones"					David Lengel				
Sarah Proctor / "Dottie Jones"					Emma Caulfield Ford				
Ravonna Renslayer		Gugu Mbatha-Raw^{S}							
Steve Rogers Hydra Stomper			Josh Keaton^{V}						
Alexei Shostakov Red Guardian						David Harbour^{V}			
Marc Spector Moon Knight						Oscar Isaac^{V}			
Stephen Strange Doctor Strange Supreme			Benedict Cumberbatch^{V}						
Sylvie		Sophia Di Martino^{S}							
Abilash Tandon / "Norm Gentilucci"					Asif Ali				
Uatu Watcher			Jeffrey Wright^{S}^{V}			Jeffrey Wright^{S}^{V}			
Melina Vostokoff			Rachel Weisz^{V}			Kari Wahlgren^{V}			
John Walker^{F}						Wyatt Russell^{V}			
"Dennis Webber"					Amos Glick				
Riri Williams Ironheart						Dominique Thorne^{V}			Dominique Thorne^{S} Alyse Elna Lewis^{Y}
Xu Shang-Chi						Simu Liu^{V}			
Xu Wenwu			Feodor Chin^{V}						
Xu Xialing						Meng'er Zhang^{V}			
Ying Nan						Michelle Wong^{V}			
Zeus						Darin De Paul^{V}			
=== Introduced in Phase Five films ===
Victor Timely		Jonathan Majors^{S}							
=== Introduced in Secret Invasion ===
Beto	Samuel Adewunmi^{S}								
Rosa Dalton	Katie Finneran^{S}								
Sonya Falsworth	Olivia Colman^{S}								
Gravik	Kingsley Ben-Adir^{S}								
Elizabeth Hill	Juliet Stevenson								
Pagon	Killian Scott^{S}								
Prescod	Richard Dormer^{S}								
Raava / James "Rhodey" Rhodes	Don Cheadle^{S} Nisha Aaliya								
Ritson	Dermot Mulroney^{S}								
Chris Stearns	Christopher McDonald^{S}								
Varra / Priscilla Fury	Charlayne Woodard^{S}								
=== Introduced in Loki season 2 ===
Robber Baron		Richard Dixon^{S}							
Don		Owen Wilson							
A. D. Doug		Ke Huy Quan							
Dox		Kate Dickie^{S}							
Gamble		Liz Carr^{S}							
Frank Morris		Eugene Cordero							
Ouroboros "OB"^{F}		Ke Huy Quan^{S}							
Verity Willis		Wunmi Mosaku							
Hunter X-5 / Brad Wolfe		Rafael Casal^{S}							
=== Introduced in What If...? season 2 ===
Atahraks			Jeremy White^{V}						
Rodrigo Alphonso Gonzolo			Gabriel Romero^{V}						
Happy Hogan "The Freak"			Jon Favreau^{V}						
Jiayi			Lauren Tom^{V}						
Kahhori			Devery Jacobs^{V}			Devery Jacobs^{V}			
Wanda-Merlin			Elizabeth Olsen^{V}						
Queen Isabella of Spain			Carolina Ravassa^{V}						
Wáhta			Kiawentiio^{V}						
W.E.R.N.E.R.			Ross Marquand^{V}						
=== Introduced in Echo ===
Biscuits				Cody Lightning^{S}					
Bonnie				Devery Jacobs^{S}					
Chafa				Julia Jones					
Chula				Tantoo Cardinal^{S}					
Henry "Black Crow" Lopez				Chaske Spencer^{S}					
Lowak				Morningstar Angeline					
Skully				Graham Greene^{S}					
Taloa				Katarina Ziervogel					
Tuklo				Dannie McCallum					
=== Introduced in Agatha All Along ===
Lilia Calderu					Patti LuPone^{S} Chloe Camp^{Y}				
"Coyote"					Chau Naumova				
"Crow"					Bethany Curry				
Death "Rio Vidal"					Aubrey Plaza^{S}				
Eddie					Miles Gutierrez-Riley^{S}				
"Fox"					Athena Perample				
Jennifer "Jen" Kale					Sasheer Zamata^{S}				
Jeff Kaplan					Paul Adelstein^{S}				
Rebecca Kaplan					Maria Dizzia^{S}				
"Owl"					Alicia Vela-Bailey				
"Rat"					Britta Grant				
Nicholas Scratch					Abel Lysenko				
"Snake"					Marina Mazepa				
Vertigo					Okwui Okpokwasili^{S}				
Alice Wu-Gulliver					Ali Ahn^{S}				
Lorna Wu					Elizabeth Anweis				
=== Introduced in What If...? season 3 ===
Byrdie the Duck						Natasha Lyonne^{V}			
Eminence						Jason Isaacs^{V}			
Executioner						Darin De Paul^{V}			
Incarnate						D. C. Douglas^{V}			
Kwai Jun-Fan						Allen Deng^{V}			
Ranger Morales						America Ferrera^{V}			
Ororo Munroe Storm the Goddess of Thunder						Alison Sealy-Smith^{V}			
=== Introduced in Your Friendly Neighborhood Spider-Man season 1 ===
Asha							Erica Luttrell^{V}		
Carmilla Black							Anairis Quiñones^{V}		
Butane							Jake Green^{V}		
Campbell							Zeno Robinson^{V}		
Amadeus Cho							Aleks Le^{V}		
Carla Connors							Zehra Fazal^{V}		
Eberhardt							Kari Wahlgren^{V}		
Emma							Erica Luttrell^{V}		
Jeanne Foucault Finesse							Anjali Kuanpaneni^{V}		
John Gallo							Roger Craig Smith^{V}		
Phil Grayfield							Roger Craig Smith^{V}		
Andre Lincoln							Matte Martinez^{V}		
Lonnie Lincoln Tombstone							Eugene Byrd^{S}^{V}		
Mr. Lincoln							Phil LaMarr^{V}		
Mrs. Lincoln							Erica Luttrell^{V}		
Mila Masaryk Unicorn							Sarah Natochenny^{V}		
Otto Octavius							Hugh Dancy^{S}^{V}		
Susan O'Hara							Zehra Fazal^{V}		
Harry Osborn							Zeno Robinson^{S}^{V}		
Norman Osborn^{6}							Colman Domingo^{S}^{V}		
Pearl Pangan							Cathy Ang^{V}		
Richard Parker							Josh Keaton^{V}		
Vincent Patilio							Kellen Goff^{V}		
James Sanders Speed Demon							Roger Craig Smith^{V}		
Dmitri Smerdyakov Chameleon							Roger Craig Smith^{V}		
Mikhail Sytsevich							Travis Willingham^{V}		
Taylor							Phil LaMarr^{V}		
Maria Vasquez							Anairis Quiñones^{V}		
Roxanna Volkov							Kari Wahlgren^{V}		
Bentley Wittman							Paul F. Tompkins^{V}		
=== Introduced in Daredevil: Born Again season 1 ===
Hector Ayala White Tiger								Kamar de los Reyes^{S}	
Soledad Ayala^{6}								Ashley Marie Ortiz	
Daniel Blake^{6}								Michael Gandolfini^{S}	
Buck Cashman^{6}								Arty Froushan^{S}	
Cherry^{6}								Clark Johnson^{S}	
Bastian Cooper Muse								Hunter Doohan	
Angela del Toro^{6}								Camila Rodriguez	
Gallo								Michael Gaston	
Heather Glenn^{6}								Margarita Levieva^{S}	
Benjamin Hochberg^{6}								John Benjamin Hickey	
Angie Kim^{6}								Ruibo Qian	
Luca								Patrick Murney	
Kirsten McDuffie^{6}								Nikki M. James^{S}	
Cole North^{6}								Jeremy Isaiah Earl	
Sofija Ozola								Elizabeth A. Davis	
Connor Powell^{6}								Hamish Allan-Headley^{R}	
Sheila Rivera^{6} ^{F}								Zabryna Guevara^{S}	
Artemis Sledge								Katherine LaNasa	
BB Urich^{6}								Genneya Walton^{S}	
=== Introduced in Ironheart ===
Jeri Blood									Zoe Terakes^{S}
Roz Blood									Shakira Barrera^{S}
Stuart Clarke Rampage									Eric André^{S}
Clown									Sonia Denis^{S}
John King									Manny Montana^{S}
Landon									Harper Anthony
Mephisto									Sacha Baron Cohen^{S}
Arthur Robbins									Paul Calderón^{S}
Parker Robbins The Hood									Anthony Ramos^{S}
Slug									Shea Couleé^{S}
Ezekiel "Zeke" Stane / Joe McGillicuddy									Alden Ehrenreich^{S}
Madeline Stanton									Cree Summer^{S}
Zelma Stanton									Regan Aliyah^{S}
Natalie Washington N.A.T.A.L.I.E.									Lyric Ross^{S} Kent Churchill^{Y}
Xavier Washington									Matthew Elam^{S}
Gary Williams									LaRoyce Hawkins
Ronnie Williams									Anji White^{S}
Sheila Zarate									Zhaleh

== Phase Six ==
List indicators
This section includes starring cast members, recurring characters, and notable guest stars, as defined by the FAQ.
- A dark grey cell indicates the character was not in the series, or that the character's presence has not yet been confirmed.
- An ^{A} indicates an appearance through archival footage.
- A ^{DS} indicates the character appears in a digital series.
- An ^{F} indicates the character appears in a film.
- An ^{OS} indicates the character appears in a One-Shot.
- An ^{S} indicates the actor was part of the starring cast for the series.
- An ^{SP} indicates the character appears in a Marvel Studios Special Presentation.
- A ^{V} indicates a voice-only role.
- A ^{Y} indicates a younger version of the character.

Character	2025		2026			2027		
Character	Eyes of Wakanda	Marvel Zombies season 1	Wonder Man	Daredevil: Born Again season 2	VisionQuest	Your Friendly Neighborhood Spider-Man season 2	Daredevil: Born Again season 3	Marvel Zombies The Winter Soldier
=== Introduced in The Infinity Saga ===
E.D.I.T.H.					Emily Hampshire^{S}			
F.R.I.D.A.Y.		Kerry Condon^{S}^{V}			Orla Brady^{S}			
J.A.R.V.I.S.					James D'Arcy^{S}			
Scott Lang Ant-Man^{DS}		Paul Rudd^{S}^{V}						
Wanda Maximoff Red Queen / Queen of the Dead		Elizabeth Olsen^{S}^{V}			Elizabeth Olsen^{C}			
Okoye		Kenna Ramsey^{S}^{V}						
Peter Parker Spider-Man^{DS}		Hudson Thames^{S}^{V}						
Raza					Faran Tahir			
Trevor Slattery^{OS}			Ben Kingsley^{S}					
Thor^{OS}		Greg Furman^{S}^{V}						
Ultron					James Spader^{S}			
Valkyrie		Tessa Thompson^{S}^{V}						
Vision					Paul Bettany^{S}			
Jimmy Woo		Randall Park^{S}^{V}						
Helmut Zemo		Rama Vallury^{S}^{V}						
=== Introduced in Marvel Television series ===
Luke Cage				Mike Colter			Mike Colter^{S}	
Mitchell Ellison				Geoffrey Cantor				
Vanessa Fisk				Ayelet Zurer^{S}				
Wilson Fisk Kingpin				Vincent D'Onofrio^{S}			Vincent D'Onofrio^{S}	
Jessica Jones				Krysten Ritter^{S}			Krysten Ritter^{S}	
Josie				Susan Varon				
Brett Mahoney				Royce Johnson			Royce Johnson	
Jack Murdock				John Patrick Hayden^{A}				
Matt Murdock Daredevil^{F}				Charlie Cox^{S} Skylar Gaertner^{A}^{Y}		Charlie Cox^{V}	Charlie Cox^{S}	
Elektra Natchios							Élodie Yung^{S}	
Franklin "Foggy" Nelson				Elden Henson^{S}				
Karen Page^{SP}				Deborah Ann Woll^{S}			Deborah Ann Woll^{S}	
Benjamin "Dex" Poindexter Bullseye				Wilson Bethel^{S}			Wilson Bethel^{S}	
Danny Rand Iron Fist							Finn Jones^{S}	
James Wesley				Toby Leonard Moore^{S}				
=== Introduced in Phase Four ===
Yelena Belova		Florence Pugh^{S}^{V}						
Kate Bishop^{F}		Hailee Steinfeld^{S}^{V}						
Eric Brooks Blade Knight		Todd Williams^{S}^{V}						
Katy Chen		Awkwafina^{S}^{V}						
P. Cleary			Arian Moayed^{S}					
Jack Duquesne Swordsman				Tony Dalton^{S}				
Kamala Khan Ms. Marvel^{F}		Iman Vellani^{S}^{V}						
Muneeba Khan^{F}		Zenobia Shroff^{S}^{V}						
Khonshu		F. Murray Abraham^{S}^{V}						
London Master		Daniel Swain^{S}^{V}						
Billy Maximoff / William Kaplan Wiccan^{F}					Joe Locke^{S}			
Tommy Maximoff / Thomas Shepherd^{F}					Ruaridh Mollica^{S}			
Rintrah		Adam Hugill^{S}^{V}						
Sara		Sheila Atim^{S}^{V}						
Alexei Shostakov Red Guardian		David Harbour^{S}^{V}						
Melina Vostokoff		Kari Wahlgren^{S}^{V}						
John Walker^{F}		Wyatt Russell^{S}^{V}						
Riri Williams Ironheart		Dominique Thorne^{S}^{V}						
Xu Shang-Chi		Simu Liu^{S}^{V}						
Xu Wenwu		Feodor Chin^{S}^{V}						
=== Introduced in Phase Five ===
Soledad Ayala				Ashley Marie Ortiz				
Daniel Blake				Michael Gandolfini^{S}				
Buck Cashman				Arty Froushan^{S}			Arty Froushan^{S}	
Angela del Toro White Tiger				Camila Rodriguez				
Heather Glenn Muse				Margarita Levieva^{S}			Margarita Levieva^{S}	
Benjamin Hochberg				John Benjamin Hickey				
Angie Kim				Ruibo Qian				
Kirsten McDuffie				Nikki M. James^{S}				
Cole North				Jeremy Isaiah Earl			Jeremy Isaiah Earl	
Norman Osborn						Colman Domingo^{S}^{V}		
Clark "Cherry" Pitts				Clark Johnson^{S}				
Connor Powell				Hamish Allan-Headley				
Sheila Rivera^{F}				Zabryna Guevara^{S}			Zabryna Guevara^{S}	
BB Urich				Genneya Walton^{S}				
=== Introduced in Phase Six films ===
Victor von Doom Doctor Doom					Robert Downey Jr.^{C}			
=== Introduced in Eyes of Wakanda ===
Achilles	Adam Gold^{S} ^{V}							
Akeya	Patricia Belcher^{V}							
Basha	Jacques Colimon^{S}^{V}							
B'Kai / Memnon	Larry Herron^{S}^{V}							
Black Panther	Anika Noni Rose^{V}							
Ebo	Isaac Robinson-Smith^{V}							
Helen of Troy	Joanna Kalafatis^{V}							
Jorani Iron Fist	Jona Xiao^{S}^{V}							
Kuda	Steve Toussaint^{S}^{V}							
Nkati The Lion	Cress Williams^{S}^{V}							
Noni	Winnie Harlow^{S}^{V}							
Odysseus	Kiff VandenHeuvel^{V}							
Paris	Yerman Gur^{V}							
Rakim	Gary Anthony Williams^{V}							
Tafari	Zeke Alton^{S}^{V}							
=== Introduced in Marvel Zombies season 1 ===
Denise		Debra Wilson^{V}						
Rick		Isaac Robinson-Smith^{V}						
Sandra		Alison Haislip^{V}						
=== Introduced in Wonder Man ===
DeMarr Davis Doorman			Byron Bowers^{S}					
Chuck Eastman			Blake Robbins					
Josh Gad			Josh Gad					
Ashley Greene			Ashley Greene					
Heyerdahl			Dan Donohue					
Janelle Jackson			X Mayo^{S}					
Von Kovak			Zlatko Burić^{S}					
Lauren			Phumzile Sitole					
Mario Lopez			Mario Lopez					
Melanie			Juliette Ortega					
Joe Pantoliano			Joe Pantoliano^{S}					
Frank Preminger			Jon A. Abrahams					
Vivian			Olivia Thirlby					
Brent Willard			Dane Larsen					
Eric Williams			Demetrius Grosse					
Martha Williams			Shola Adewusi					
Sanford Williams			Béchir Sylvain					
Simon Williams			Yahya Abdul-Mateen II^{S} Kameron J. Meadows^{Y}					
=== Introduced in Daredevil: Born Again season 2 ===
Ariana				Annie Parisse				
Danielle Cage				Annabelle and Isabella Ivlev				
Charles				Matthew Lillard^{S}			Matthew Lillard^{S}	
Marge McCaffrey				Lili Taylor^{S}				
Lionel "Ray" McCoy				Nathan Wallace				
Christofi Savva				Yorgos Karamihos				
Steverud				Ty Jones				
Waters				Deirdre Lovejoy				
=== Introduced in VisionQuest ===
Josephine "Jo" Carrington Jocasta					T'Nia Miller^{S}			
Clancy					Ben Crompton^{S}			
Dale					Brian Quinn			
D.E.E.D.E.E.					Jennifer Connelly^{V}			
Paul Denning Paladin					Todd Stashwick^{S}			
D.U.M.-E.					Henry Lewis^{S}			
Rebecca Edwards					Joanne Randle^{S}			
Fiona Guthrie					Polly Frame^{S}			
Handler					Diane Morgan^{S}			
Phineas Horton					Paul Bettany^{S}			
Victoria Horton					Dulcie Connor			
Violette Horton					Charlie Russell			
Virgil Horton					James Spader^{S}			
J.I.M. Synthetic Man					Paul Bettany^{S}			
Lisa Molinari					Lauren Morais^{S}			
Simon Moorhouse					Art Malik^{S}			
Proto-One					Paul Bettany^{S}^{V}			
U.					Jonathan Sayer^{S}			
Katerina Wells					Mary McDonnell^{S}			
=== Introduced in Your Friendly Neighborhood Spider-Man season 2 ===
Eddie Brock						Josh Keaton^{V}		

== See also ==
- MCU film actors
- The Infinity Saga film actors
- Marvel's Special Presentations actors
- Marvel One-Shots actors
- MCU television actors (Marvel Television)
