= Smithereens (Black Mirror) =

- Black Mirror episode
- Promotional poster
- Episode no.: Series 5 Episode 2
- Directed by: James Hawes
- Written by: Charlie Brooker
- Cinematography by: Lukas Strebel
- Editing by: Jamie Pearson
- Original air date: 5 June 2019
- Running time: 70 minutes

Guest appearances
- Andrew Scott as Christopher Gillhaney; Damson Idris as Jaden Tommins; Topher Grace as Billy Bauer; Monica Dolan as CS Linda Grace; Amanda Drew as Hayley Blackwood; Daniel Ings as David Gilkes; Ruibo Qian as Penelope Wu

Episode chronology
← Previous "Striking Vipers"	Next → "Rachel, Jack and Ashley Too"

"Smithereens" is the second episode of the fifth series of the British science fiction anthology series Black Mirror. Written by series creator and showrunner Charlie Brooker and directed by James Hawes, it premiered on Netflix on 5 June 2019, alongside "Striking Vipers" and "Rachel, Jack and Ashley Too". In the episode, the rideshare driver Chris (Andrew Scott) takes hostage the intern Jaden (Damson Idris) of Smithereen, a large social media company, making a demand to contact the company's CEO Billy Bauer (Topher Grace).

The episode was inspired by an experience Brooker had in a car hired via Uber when the driver got out unexpectedly to get a bottle of water. He also began a story around how a person grieves the loss of a loved one differently when their life is permanently inscribed in social media. Smithereen is similar to the social media website Twitter and Bauer was compared to its CEO at the time, Jack Dorsey. Most filming took place in England, but Grace's scenes were filmed in Spain. Scenes were shot roughly in chronological order, at Scott's request, and his inability to drive was a challenge for the production.

The major theme in "Smithereens" is the power social media companies wield and their products' adverse effects, primarily their designed addictiveness. Critical reception was mixed: Scott's acting received widespread praise and a nomination for a Primetime Emmy Award, but reviewers mostly criticised the episode's storyline and the simplicity of its message. It was ranked poorly compared to other 'Black Mirror' installments.

== Plot ==
Chris Gillhaney (Andrew Scott) is a rideshare driver in London. He has sex with Hayley (Amanda Drew), a woman from his group therapy, who has been trying to guess the password to her late daughter's Persona account to find out what led to her suicide. One day, Chris picks up Jaden (Damson Idris), an employee at the social media company Smithereen. Chris abducts him at gunpoint but is furious upon discovering that he is a newly joined intern. A police officer sees Jaden in the back seat with a bag over his head and pursues with her partner. In the chase, Chris veers to avoid two teenage cyclists and stalls the car in a field. An additional contingent of police arrive, led by CS Linda Grace (Monica Dolan).

Chris aims to speak with Smithereen CEO Billy Bauer (Topher Grace). He sends a picture of Jaden at gunpoint to Jaden's superior. Word gets to COO Penelope Wu (Ruibo Qian) in the U.S., who speaks to Chris. However, Billy is on a solitary retreat. As police visit Chris's listed address, Smithereen gather much more information through Chris's social media profiles. Formerly a teacher, Chris lost his fiancée Tamsin in a car accident with a drunk driver three years earlier and has been planning a kidnapping for weeks. The hostage negotiator David Gilkes (Daniel Ings) speaks to Chris, but Chris has researched negotiator tactics and leverages the hostage so that David leaves.

Smithereen record Chris while he is on hold. Chris notices the police's behaviour changes after he lies to Jaden that the gun is fake; bystanders overhear the police and post the misinformation on social media. He threatens to shoot Jaden in five minutes unless Billy calls him; despite Penelope and the FBI's protestations, Billy does so. Chris reveals that he believes himself responsible for the car accident that killed his fiancée; he was checking a Smithereen notification when the cars collided, but the other driver was blamed. Chris and Billy agree that Smithereen has been designed to be as addictive as possible and Billy says he was planning to quit as CEO. Chris implies he will now kill himself, but Billy begs Chris to let him help. Chris thinks of a last favour: ask Persona to give Hayley her daughter's password.

Chris tries to release Jaden, who urges Chris not to attempt suicide and then fights to take his gun off him. At Grace's orders, snipers fire into the car as the pair struggle. Around the world, people check their phones, then continue on with their lives.

== Production ==
External videos
- "Black Mirror: Smithereens"; The trailer for "Smithereens".

A fifth series of Black Mirror was commissioned by Netflix in March 2018, three months after the release of series four. Initially part of series five's production, the interactive work Black Mirror: Bandersnatch increased in scope to the point where it was separated from the series and released as a standalone film; it premiered on 28 December 2018. Although previous series of the programme produced under Netflix contained six episodes, series 5 comprises three episodes, as series creator Charlie Brooker viewed this as preferable to making viewers wait longer for the next series. The three episodes—"Striking Vipers", "Smithereens" and "Rachel, Jack and Ashley Too"—were released on Netflix simultaneously on 5 June 2019. As Black Mirror is an anthology series, each instalment can be watched in any order.

=== Conception and writing ===
"Smithereens" was written by Brooker, who wanted the series to contain an episode without any futuristic technology, to remind viewers that Black Mirror is not solely a science fiction show. Previous such instalments include the first episode, "The National Anthem", and season three's "Shut Up and Dance". The two initial sparks for "Smithereens" were a question about how a person deals with the loss of a loved one whose life has been recorded in social media and an experience in a rideshare car booked through Uber. In the latter, the driver unexpectedly got out of the car and looked for something in the boot, while Brooker realised he was unaware of where they were. The driver was just getting some water.

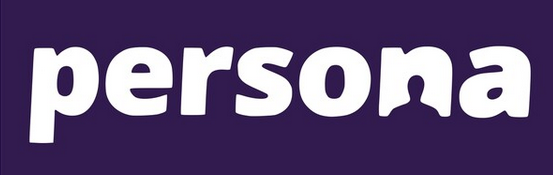
The grieving Hayley aims to access her daughter's social media account on the fictional website Persona.

The former idea developed into a story where the protagonist was trying to get into the social media account of somebody who died by suicide, but Brooker thought it would be "extremely superficial and cheap, and also weirdly slightly intrusive" to give a "glib reason" for a character's suicide. In the final episode, the secondary character Hayley has this storyline, but the contents of her daughter's Persona account are not shown. Brooker said, "Really, she's probably just going to open another box of questions by going in there".

Executive producer Annabel Jones described Chris as "overwhelmed" and said that he "feels like an onlooker" over society. Discussing the psychological effects of technology, Brooker said that he used to "reach for a cigarette first thing in the morning" as a chain smoker, and now does the same thing with his smartphone for a "similar reward-feedback loop". Jones gave the example of a homescreen showing the number of unread emails as gamification, one of many features that witness how phones are "subtly and incrementally ... designed to absorb you".

Billy Bauer was written to embody a Silicon Valley entrepreneur: Brooker said that Billy thinks himself a "switched on, liberal, hippy kind of guy". He was not written to be a "cartoon villain" or resemble any particular social media CEOs, though Brooker did take inspiration from a ten-day retreat taken by then-Twitter CEO Jack Dorsey. Jones commented that Billy is "as lost as" Chris and feels "out of control".

Brooker described the episode's ending, in which strangers are seen looking at their phones, as a message about how the characters' lives were "reduced to ephemeral confetti that just passes us by". The "most important day" of Chris's life and maybe Jaden's is "reduced to the level of a pop-up".

=== Casting and filming ===
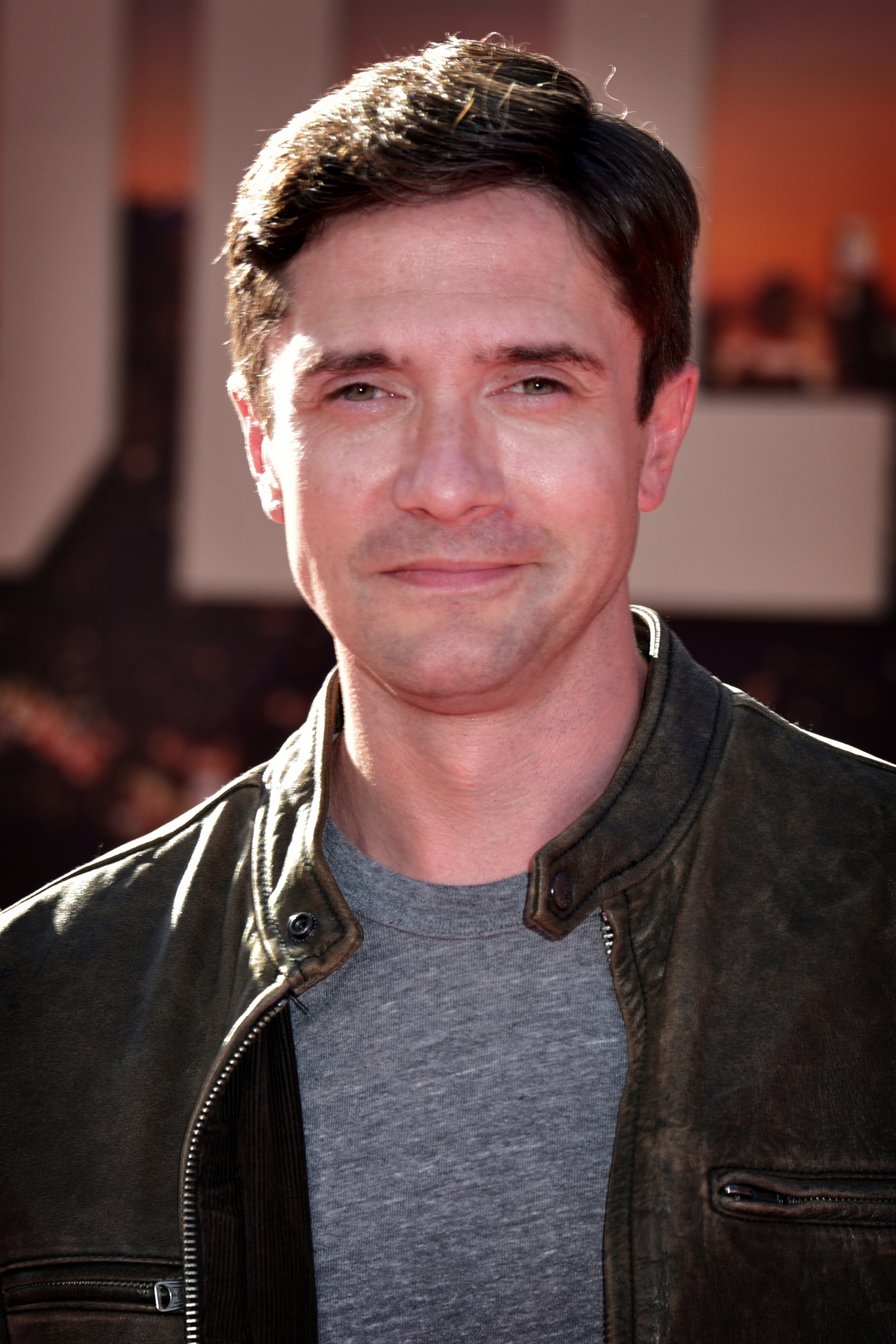
Topher Grace, a fan of the series, played Billy Bauer in the episode “Smithereens”.

Having previously talked to Brooker about appearing, Scott joined the cast of "Smithereens" as he was "really gripped by [the main] character." He described himself as less interested in technology than "the idea of the vulnerability of people that a simple mistake can be made at any given moment and you can blame it on yourself or you can blame it the powers that be". Per Scott's request, most of the episode was shot in chronological order, so that he could "slowly reveal" more of Chris's character. He said he was "as playful as possible" when acting, aiming to perform "in as many different ways as possible". One difficulty in filming was that Scott did not know how to drive a car. Production mounted a car on top of a mobile platform and instructed Scott to mimic steering to go along with filming.

Topher Grace—who had recently filmed for BlacKkKlansman (2018)—played Billy Bauer. He had been looking to vary the types of characters he played and was a fan of the show, having particularly enjoyed season two's "Be Right Back" and other episodes which "are more emotional than technology-based". He was surprised while reading the script when he reached Billy's appearance, having built up an expectation that he would be more villainous. He said that similar tech company founders had "created their own legend" and that he expected Billy to stand out in a crowd and have a distinctive "relationship with spirituality". For this reason, Grace wanted Billy to be bald but after discussion he ended up with a bun. Grace told an interviewer that he was unsure of whether Billy was "as trapped as he says", but that he does not personally like "people like this". Damson Idris played the Smithereen intern Jaden. His first Black Mirror audition was for the series three episode "Men Against Fire".

Director James Hawes had previously directed "Hated in the Nation" in the third series. Most of the filming took place in England, overlapping with production of Bandersnatch. Urban scenes were filmed in various downtown London locations. Some footage was shot in Harrietsham, Maidstone in Kent and in a field near Gravesend around June 2018. The Fairbourne Reservoir in Kent was used as a location for boardroom scenes. Grace flew to the UK to watch Scott's acting and briefly meet him before the filming of his scenes in Spain. To help Grace match the emotional intensity of Scott during the phone call, an actor was hired to read Chris's lines offscreen—usually the person in such a role is not a professional actor.

=== Soundtrack ===
The episode's music was composed by the Japanese artist Ryuichi Sakamoto, known for his electronic music and soundtracks. It incorporates synthesisers which, according to Pitchfork reviewer Daniel Martin-McCormick, create "rising tension", "a looming state of emergency" and are "steadfastly integrated" with the episode. The soundtrack was released as an album two days after the episode's premiere.

All tracks are written by Ryuichi Sakamoto.

Black Mirror: Smithereens track listing
No.	Title	Length
1.	"meditation app"	5:03
2.	"plot"	1:08
3.	"this is my last day"	1:09
4.	"hayley"	1:29
5.	"prey"	2:27
6.	"chain smoking addict"	1:03
7.	"chase"	2:50
8.	"reverse surface"	1:35
9.	"closing in"	1:38
10.	"countdown"	0:57
11.	"retreat"	0:30
12.	"flashback"	1:05
13.	"gun is real"	0:43
14.	"shot"	2:09
15.	"degrade"	0:55
16.	"car crash"	2:59
17.	"this is my last day 2"	2:36
18.	"memory of a single moment"	1:31
19.	"release"	2:17

== Analysis ==
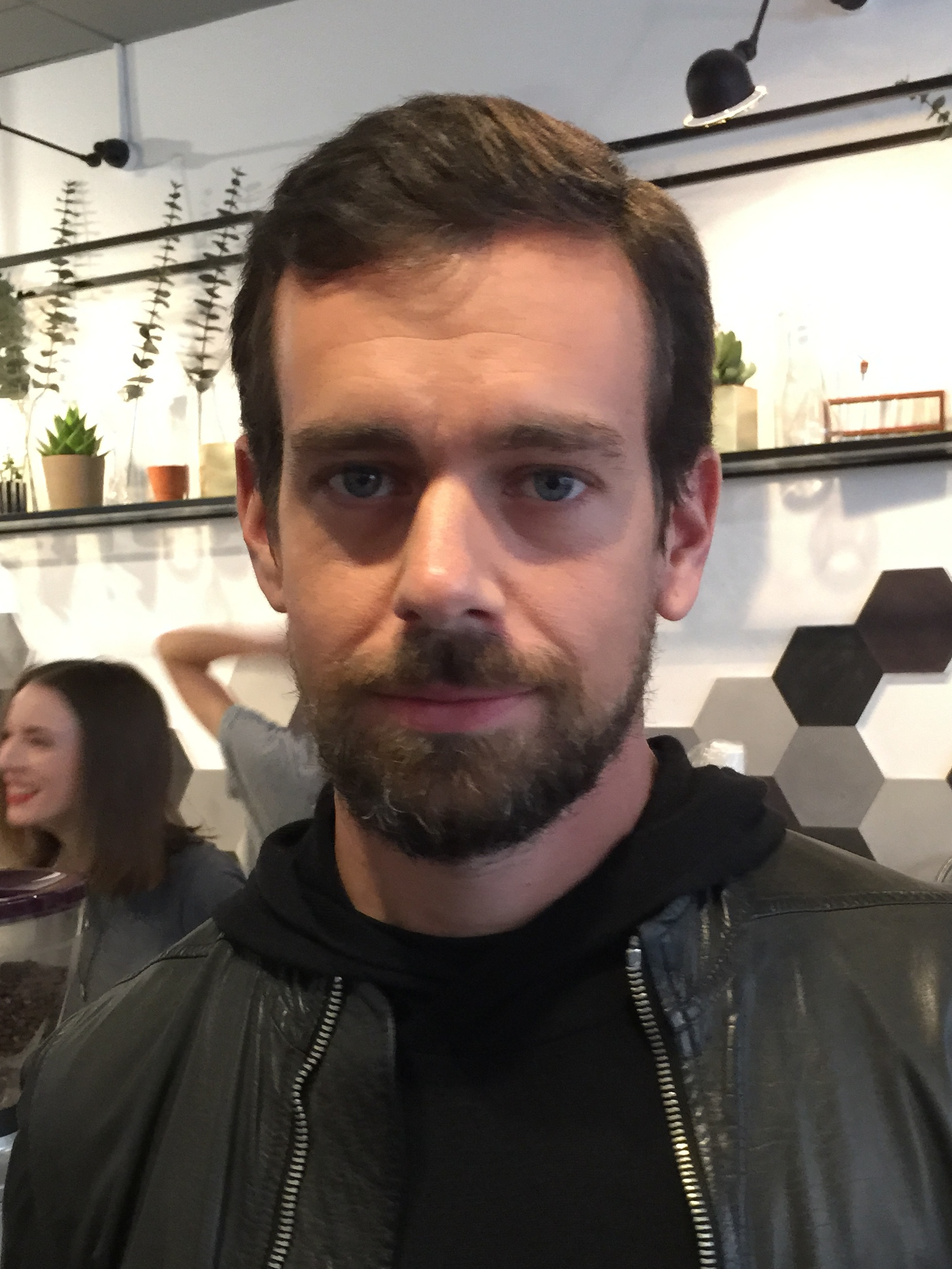
Many reviewers drew comparisons between Billy Bauer and then-Twitter CEO Jack Dorsey.

Charles Bramesco of Vulture and Matt Reynolds of Wired found the episode to have a police procedural style, similar to the third series episode "Hated in the Nation". Atypical for the genre, the gathering of intelligence is speedy, due to the power of the social media companies, rather than forming the majority of the episode's runtime. "Smithereens" is set in 2018; David Sims of The Atlantic said it "could've been pulled from today's headlines". He drew the connection that as with "The National Anthem", it showcases a news story which "begins to spiral out of control online". Vox reviewer Aja Romano found that it "blends a hefty mix of bleak nihilism and social satire" and "comes across like a thesis statement for the series as a whole". Louisa Mellor of Den of Geek saw a "black comedy of errors" in Chris's plan quickly going wrong in several ways, and Sims commented that the episode showcases "classic hostage tropes" including "the panicked cops, the slick negotiator [and] the snipers looking for a shot through their scopes". Stephanie Dube Dwilson, writing for Heavy, noted an absence of an "unexpected" or "incredibly dark" twist, as many prior episodes employ.

The episode suggests that social media companies are unaccountable and make people vulnerable and powerless. Chris Longo suggested in Den of Geek that the technology is "purposely designed to give us tiny hits of dopamine". The former Facebook president Sean Parker spoke in a 2017 event about the addictiveness of social media, saying that he, Facebook CEO Mark Zuckerberg and Instagram's Kevin Systrom "understood this consciously" but "did it anyway". Mellor said that it is "gently ironic" that Chris uses a meditation app on his phone "to escape the effects of other apps". The social psychologist Rosanna Guadagno highlighted that "research has shown that notifications from our phones have a negative impact on our stress levels, anxiety levels, and overall wellbeing". The song "Can't Take My Eyes Off You" occurs throughout the episode and plays in the closing credits; Mellor called the song choice "a gag about phone addiction".

The episode shows social media companies as more powerful than law enforcement in profiling people. Guadagno saw Smithereen's information gathering on Chris as "both a violation of privacy" and a demonstration of "what you can learn about someone based on surveilling their digital activities". Victoria Turk of Wired saw it unrealistic that Smithereen choose to get involved with police activity, saying that such companies "seem to constantly distance themselves" from this "as they don't want that responsibility".

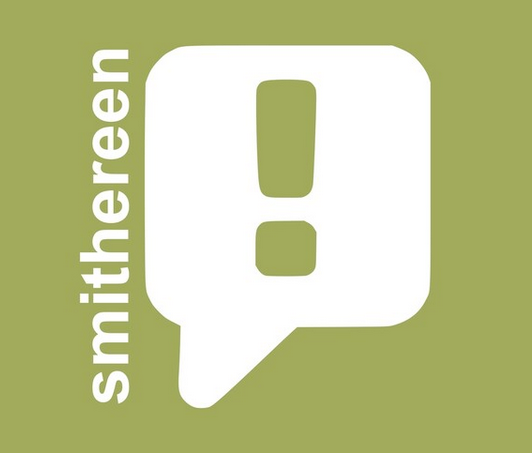
Critics identified the fictional Smithereen with the social media website Twitter.

Critics most commonly compared Billy Bauer to Jack Dorsey, the CEO of Twitter at the time. Thomas Gorton of Dazed and Paste's Jim Vorel made comparisons to Zuckerberg, and Vorel also saw an aspect of Apple Inc. founder Steve Jobs in Billy. Smithereen was identified as similar to Twitter, and Persona to Facebook. Ed Cumming of The Independent commented of the name choice: "A smithereen is a tiny fragment of something, the debris of an explosion: the firm's users and also the information they post". Chris Longridge, writing for Digital Spy, saw a "religious parable" in Billy, who could represent Jesus or a Christian God. Longridge described Billy as "effectively omniscient", with a "Renaissance-art Jesus vibe". However, he "turns out to be just a guy", which could symbolise an "existential crisis of humankind in a world that no longer has God".

Reviewers gave differing descriptions of Chris's motives and behaviour. Olly Richards of NME said that Chris "holds Smithereen responsible" for his ex-fiancée's death, an easier choice "than accepting that he was at fault"; however, Longo said that when Chris talks to Billy, the audience learns that he "doesn't scapegoat Smithereen". Vorel said that Chris may be "at war with himself" over his choices, leading to "a spastic, explosive sort of nervous energy". Sims saw the episode as "a tale of two totally adrift people"—Chris and Billy—"unable to continue living in an interconnected world". Dwilson saw their conversation as exhibiting "the power of a simple one-on-one exchange in a world dominated by terse social exchanges". Guadagno hoped that after their call, Billy could "make his social media platform about maximizing positive human connection by making people the customer, not the commodity".

Easter egg references to previous episodes are made through frames of a character scrolling through contacts in their phone, many of whom share names with previous Black Mirror characters, and trending topics on Smithereen include SaitoGemu, a video game company from "Playtest", and Tucker, the company behind simulated reality in "San Junipero".

== Reception ==
=== Critical response ===
The episode received mixed reception, with most critics finding the storyline and subject matter lacking in complexity, but Scott's performance accomplished. On the review aggregator Rotten Tomatoes, the episode holds an approval rating of 65% based on 26 reviews. The website's critical consensus reads, "A slippery moral dilemma and a superb turn from Andrew Scott make 'Smithereens' watchable, even if its familiar story feels more like an early episode of Black Mirror than a fresh futuristic horror story." Out of five stars, the episode garnered four stars in The Telegraph, three in the BBC and The Independent and two in Vulture. It received a rating of 7.8 out of 10 in the magazine Paste. Complex's Frazier Tharpe thought the episode was the best of series five, but The Guardian's Lucy Mangan found it "perhaps least successful". Sims said it was the "only definite flop" of the series as it "suffers from many of the flaws" of the fourth one.

Critics identified self-parody, drama and cliché as aspects of the episode, and mostly reviewed its tone negatively. Mellor said that it "feels like an imitation" of the "uniquely identifiable personality" of Black Mirror. Romano and Richards criticised the episode as reliant on clichés. Cumming summarised it as "muted rather than subtle" and Hugh Montgomery reviewed it for the BBC as "a rather inert and under-characterised drama". Longridge suggested that the episode may be "winking at the audience", given that it relates to a well-known parody of the show's message: "what if phones, but too much". Similarly, Mellor and Tharpe highlighted potential self-parody in Chris's rant upon discovering Jaden is an intern, though Tharpe found this nevertheless "emotionally affecting". Tharpe also praised the episode as tense and "well-paced" yet "casually hilarious".

The storyline and central theme were mostly criticised. As the longest episode of the series, "Smithereens" was criticised for length by Cumming and Sims, who both described the plot as "thin", as did Turk. Mellor said that it "lacks this show's usual depth", Turk found "the scope a bit narrow" and Richards viewed it as having "little to say that isn't already common opinion". Sims wrote that it was "hampered by ... how long it takes for the action to get going". The exploration of social media was reviewed by Turk to be "a bit two-dimensional" and Longo saw the episode as "too self-contained to fully realize the potential of the ideas". Montgomery wrote that the characters are "being held ransom to a plotline which is a vehicle for some rather clunky point-making" and Romano saw the message as "both redundant and a little weak". Bramesco critiqued the episode as having a "strong concept with lots of avenues for deeper exploration" which was averted in favour of "the same old conclusion about smartphones exacerbating our worst qualities", while both Longo and Turk saw concerns about data privacy to be unsatisfactorily explored.

Some critics were disappointed by a lack of twists in the episode, while Chris's recounting of the car crash and the ending received mixed reception. Mangan and Reynolds both said that the episode did not "twist and turn" as much as it should have and Sims "kept waiting for a twist that never really arrived". Reynolds found the storyline predictable from the 15 minute mark onwards, though Dwilson was "never quite sure where the episode was heading" and mostly guessed incorrectly. Longo saw Chris's "big reveal" about the cause of the car crash to be "devastating", but Romano said it "simply doesn't land with much impact". Mellor saw the ending as a "more subtle and effective point about social media", but Richards said it "falls flat" and Bramesco called it a "contrived non-ending".

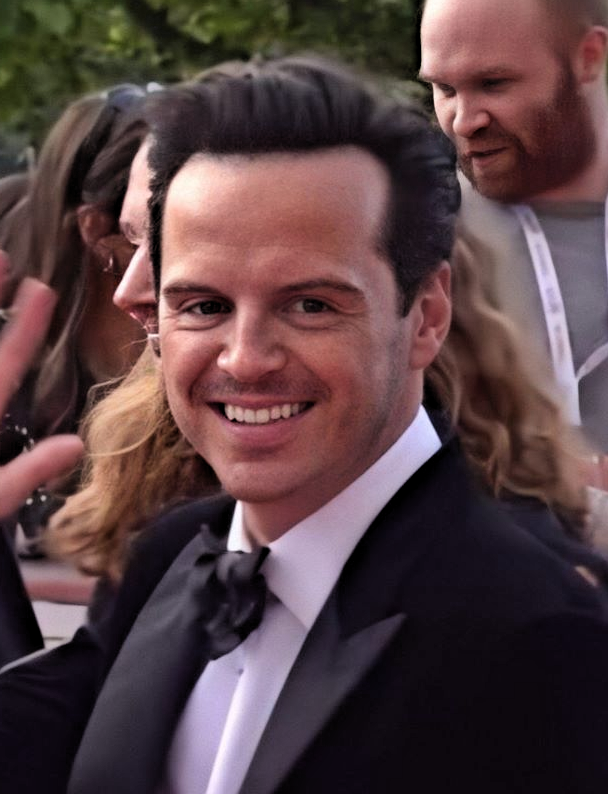
Andrew Scott's acting received praise even among some negative reviews.

Andrew Scott's role as Chris received critical acclaim. Several critics found that his performance was the highlight of an otherwise poor episode, such as Sims, who said that Scott's "committed lead performance" made him "at least interested throughout", and Reynolds, who said that Scott "just about held [the episode] all together". Benji Wilson of The Telegraph found that his "astonishing control and range ... elevated a too-tidy plot". Montgomery called the character "a compellingly twitchy, ambiguous presence", while Mangan said Scott had "uniquely potent and peculiar energy" which is "perfectly channelled" into Chris. Longo said that the acting is "unnerving throughout", but that Scott "dials it up to a 10" in the phone call with Billy. Bramesco viewed it differently, saying that Scott "feels like he's starting at a ten and leaving himself nowhere to go" and finding Scott unconvincing in the phone call, "seemingly uncertain whether the moment should be played hysterically or for genuine pathos". While Cumming found Chris to be "the only developed character", Longo said that the episode "missed key chances to add depth" to Chris.

Other actors and characters received more mixed reception. Montgomery found Grace "an amusing Jack Dorsey parody", and Dwilson "appreciated how his character surprised [her]" in his relatability. Vorel, in contrast, found it "rather difficult" to empathise with Billy. Idris received praise for his role from Dwilson and Romano. The storyline involving Hayley was criticised as "undercooked" by Cumming and "extraneous frippery" by Bramesco, but Vorel found the nature of her attempting to log into her daughter's Persona account every day a "powerful, Sisyphean piece of imagery".

Hawes received praise from Romano as he "keeps the pace taut", while Longo analysed that he "deliberately shot Chris' reactions to the use of phones in a cafe to cast a shadow of isolation around him" and used "flashback", "foreshadowing" and "purposeful misdirection". Pitchfork rated the soundtrack 6.8 out of 10, for being effective but lacking "iconic melodies". The reviewer, Martin-McCormick, found that the track "Meditation App" would fit in "the lobby of a high-end spa", but did not recommend the other tracks as standalone music.

=== Episode rankings ===
"Smithereens" ranked poorly on critics' lists of the 23 instalments of Black Mirror, from best to worst:

- 11th – James Hibberd, Entertainment Weekly
- 11th – Ed Power, The Telegraph
- 15th – Matt Miller, Esquire
- 17th – Travis Clark, Business Insider
- 19th – Morgan Jeffery and Rosie Fletcher, Digital Spy
- 20th – Aubrey Page, Collider
- 21st – Tim Molloy, TheWrap
- 21st – Charles Bramesco, Vulture

IndieWire authors ranked the 22 Black Mirror instalments excluding Bandersnatch by quality, giving "Smithereens" a position of 11th. Instead of by quality, Proma Khosla of Mashable ranked the episodes by tone, concluding that "Smithereens" was the 10th-most pessimistic episode of the show.

=== Awards ===
As the fifth series of Black Mirror consisted of three episodes that do not tell a complete story, it was not initially clear whether it would compete in TV Movie or Limited Series or Drama Series categories of the Emmy Awards. After Netflix petitioned to allow "Smithereens" as a TV Movie, despite a new rule that entries must be 75 minutes or longer, it was initially reported that it would be nominated in this category. Later, the Academy of Television Arts & Sciences announced that the episode would instead be competing as a Drama Series, where performers who appear in less than 50% of a series have the choice to compete in leading, supporting, or guest awards. Scott was nominated for the Outstanding Guest Actor in a Drama Series category. The winner was Ron Cephas Jones for This Is Us.

== See also ==
- Problematic social media use
- Problematic smartphone use
- Smartphone zombie
- Mobile phones and driving safety
- Internet addiction disorder
