= Ruibo Qian =

American actress (born 1983)

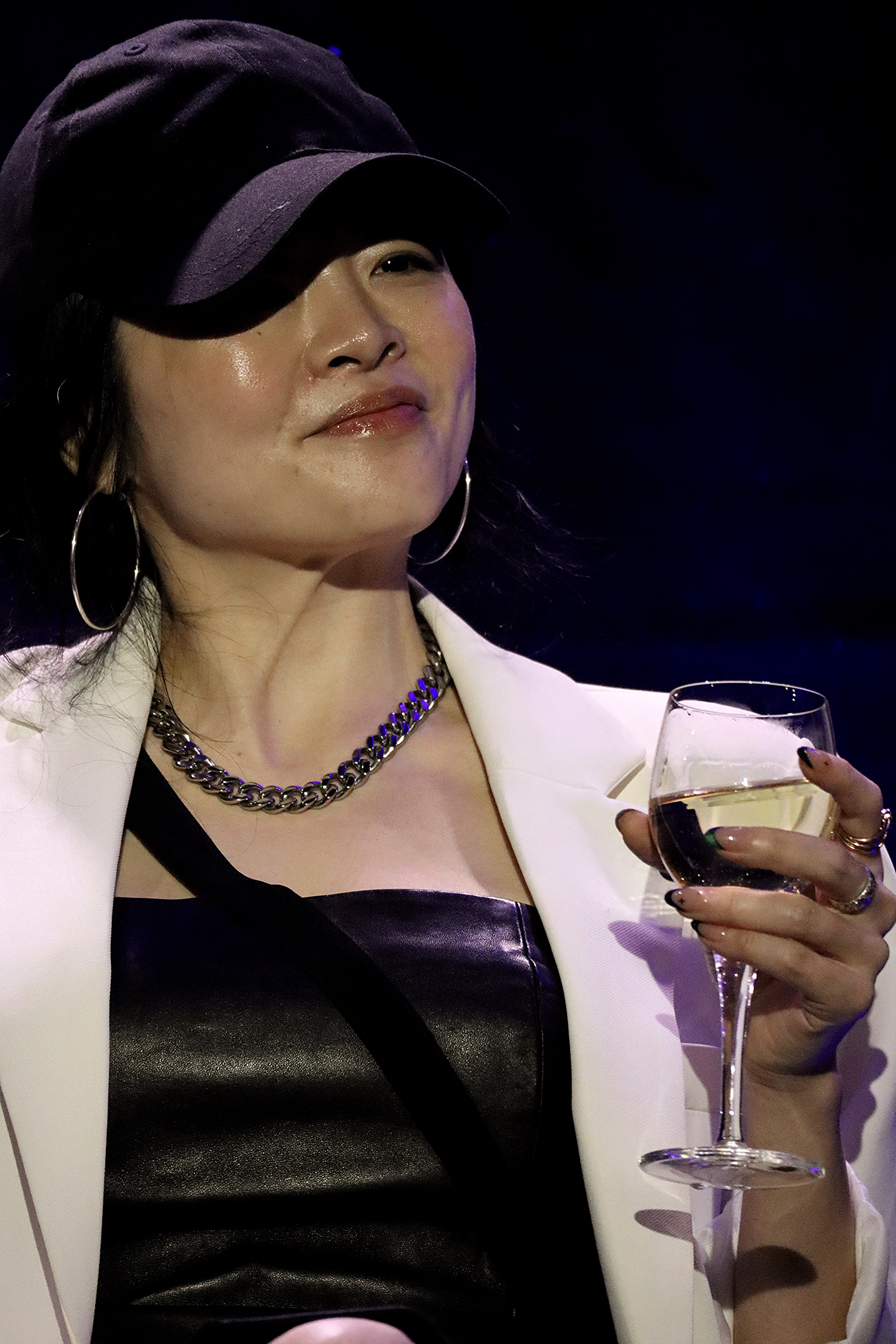
- Ruibo Qian in 2025
- Born: Shanghai, China
- Education: Boston University (BFA); New York University (MFA)
- Occupations: Actor, musician
- Years active: 2013–present
- Website: ruiboqian.com

Ruibo Qian (born 1 January 1983) is an American stage, film, and television actor and musician. She is best known for her roles as Penelope Wu in the Black Mirror episode "Smithereens", as Dr. Bethany in Manchester by the Sea, and as Zheng Yi Sao in the HBO Max series Our Flag Means Death.

== Early life ==
Qian was born in Shanghai and grew up in Texas. She obtained a BFA in acting from Boston University School of Theater Arts and an MFA also in acting from New York University.

== Career ==
Qian has appeared in a number of stage, film, and television programmes since 2013.

In 2017, Qian acted in Signature Theatre's production of The Red Letter Plays: F**king A and played the violin and guitar on stage.

In 2023, Qian joined the cast of Our Flag Means Death in its second season. She plays Susan, who is revealed to be Zheng Yi Sao, a character based on the real historical figure. John Anderson of The Wall Street Journal praised Qian's performance, writing “Ruibo Qian right now may be the funniest woman on television”.

== Filmography ==
=== Film ===
Year	Title	Role
2016	Manchester by the Sea	Dr. Bethany
2018	Viral Beauty	Tara Zhang
2019	Before You Know It	Pregnant Lady

=== Television ===
Year	Title	Role	Notes
2013	Whatever This Is.	Shannon	
2014	Broad City	Janelle	
2015	Eat Our Feelings	Kate	
2015	Above Average Presents	Hipster 3 (as Rubio Qian)	
2015	Jessica Jones	Mei	Episode: "AKA Ladies Night"
2014–2016	Mozart in the Jungle	Triangle Tanya	Recurring role, 10 episodes
2018	New Amsterdam	Yong-Mi	
2019	The Code	Lt. Elena Jin	
2019	The Good Fight	Hanna	
2019	Black Mirror	Penelope Wu	Episode: "Smithereens"
2019	Orange Is the New Black	'Mad Megan' Prince	2 episodes
2019	Living with Yourself	Breastfeeding Woman	
2020	The Sinner	Perkins	
2020	High Maintenance	Syd Li	
2021	Evil	Mila	
2022	Servant	Mommy	
2023	Our Flag Means Death	Zheng Yi Sao/Susan	Recurring role, 6 episodes
2025–present	Daredevil: Born Again	Detective Angie Kim	9 episodes
2026	CIA	Lin Wu	Episode: "Bridge of Lies"

== Theater ==
Year	Title	Role	Director	Venue
2014	You For Me For You	Junhee	Yury Urnov	Woolly Mammoth Theatre Company
2014	Water by the Spoonful	Orangutan	Edward Torres	Old Globe Theatre
2015	Red Flamboyant	Vung/Trung Trac	Laura Savia	Calvary-St. George's Parish
2016	Tiger Style!	Jennifer Chen	Moritz von Stuelpnagel	Huntington Theatre Company
2017	Bull in a China Shop	Jeannette Marks	Lee Sunday Evans	Lincoln Theater
2017	The Red Letter Plays: F**king A	Various roles	Jo Bonney	Signature Theatre Company
2019	The Great Leap	Connie	Lisa Peterson	American Conservatory Theater
2019	Significant Other	Laura	Lauren English	San Francisco Playhouse
2019	Becky Nurse of Salem	Witch	Anne Kauffman	Berkeley Repertory Theatre
2021	P.S.	Adult Ona	Teddy Bergman	Ars Nova (theater)
2022	Golden Shield	Eva	May Adrales	Manhattan Theatre Club
2022	Dial M for Murder	Maxine	Stafford Arima	Old Globe Theatre
2023	The Merry Wives of Windsor	Mrs. Page	James Vasquez	Old Globe Theatre
