= Marvel Cinematic Universe: Phase Five =

2023–2025 group of superhero media

Phase Five
- Based on: Characters published by Marvel Comics
- Produced by: Kevin Feige; Stephen Broussard (A&WQ); Lauren Shuler Donner (D&W); Ryan Reynolds (D&W); Shawn Levy (D&W); Nate Moore (BNW)
- Starring: See below
- Production companies: Marvel Studios; Marvel Studios Animation (animated series); Maximum Effort (D&W); 21 Laps Entertainment (D&W); Proximity Media (IH)
- Distributed by: Walt Disney Studios Motion Pictures; Disney Platform Distribution (TV series)
- Release date: 2023–2025
- Country: United States
- Language: English
- Budget: Total (6 films): $1.573 billion
- Box office: Total (6 films): $3.663 billion

Marvel Cinematic Universe Phases
- The Infinity Saga; Phase One (2008–2012); Phase Two (2013–2015); Phase Three (2016–2019)
- The Multiverse Saga; Phase Four (2021–2022); Phase Five (2023–2025); Phase Six (2025–2027)

Phase Five of the Marvel Cinematic Universe (MCU) is a group of American superhero films and television series produced by Marvel Studios based on characters that appear in publications by Marvel Comics. The MCU is the shared universe in which all of the films and series are set. The phase includes television series produced by Marvel Studios and Marvel Studios Animation for the streaming service Disney+. The 2023 Hollywood labor disputes impacted the phase, leading to various schedule changes. It began with the film Ant-Man and the Wasp: Quantumania in February 2023 and ended with the series Ironheart in July 2025. Phases Four, Five, and Six make up "The Multiverse Saga" storyline.

Kevin Feige produced every film in the phase, with Lauren Shuler Donner, Ryan Reynolds, and Shawn Levy also producing Deadpool & Wolverine (2024), and Marvel Studios executives Stephen Broussard and Nate Moore also producing some of the phase's other films. The films star Paul Rudd as Scott Lang / Ant-Man and Evangeline Lilly as Hope van Dyne / Wasp in Quantumania; Chris Pratt as Peter Quill / Star-Lord in Guardians of the Galaxy Vol. 3 (2023); Brie Larson as Carol Danvers / Captain Marvel, Teyonah Parris as Monica Rambeau, and Iman Vellani as Kamala Khan / Ms. Marvel in The Marvels (2023); Reynolds as Wade Wilson / Deadpool and Hugh Jackman as Logan / Wolverine in Deadpool & Wolverine; Anthony Mackie as Sam Wilson / Captain America in Captain America: Brave New World (2025); and Florence Pugh as Yelena Belova in Thunderbolts* (2025). Walt Disney Studios Motion Pictures distributed the films, which grossed over US$3.6 billion at the global box office. The Marvels is the first box-office bomb of the MCU.

Marvel Studios' approach to television shifted during work on this phase, moving away from limited event series to focus more on multi-season series. Several new labels were introduced for the studio's series during this phase: "Marvel Animation" for the animated series; "Marvel Spotlight" for the more standalone series Echo (2024); and "Marvel Television" for other live-action series, starting with Agatha All Along (2024). The television series star Samuel L. Jackson as Nick Fury in Secret Invasion (2023), Tom Hiddleston as Loki in the second season of Loki (2023), Jeffrey Wright as the Watcher in the second and third seasons of the animated What If...? (2023–24), Alaqua Cox as Maya Lopez / Echo in Echo, Kathryn Hahn as Agatha Harkness in Agatha All Along, Hudson Thames as Peter Parker / Spider-Man in the first season of the animated Your Friendly Neighborhood Spider-Man (2025), Charlie Cox as Matt Murdock / Daredevil in the first season of Daredevil: Born Again (2025), and Dominique Thorne as Riri Williams / Ironheart in Ironheart.

The second season of the I Am Groot animated shorts and a tie-in comic book for Your Friendly Neighborhood Spider-Man are also included in this phase. Hiddleston, Jackson, and Sebastian Stan—who plays Bucky Barnes—have the most appearances in the phase, each starring or making cameo appearances in four productions. Additionally, the first season of the Marvel Studios Animation series X-Men '97 was released on Disney+ alongside Phase Five as part of the Multiverse Saga.

== Development ==
=== Initial work and announcement ===
By April 2014, Marvel Studios president Kevin Feige said that additional storylines for the Marvel Cinematic Universe (MCU) were planned through 2028. During Marvel Studios' panel at San Diego Comic-Con in July 2019, Feige announced several films and Disney+ television series in development for Phase Four of the MCU, before revealing the film Blade was also in development. After the panel, Feige confirmed that Blade was not part of the Phase Four slate at the time, and that what was announced was the full Phase Four slate at that point, despite Marvel already developing further projects at that time, such as the long-in-development Guardians of the Galaxy Vol. 3 and a sequel to Captain Marvel (2019). A sequel to Ant-Man and the Wasp (2018) entered development by November 2019, for a potential release in 2022. Development work on a second season of What If...? had begun by December 2019. Ryan Reynolds confirmed that month that a third Deadpool film after 20th Century Fox's Deadpool (2016) and Deadpool 2 (2018) was in development at Marvel Studios, with his production company Maximum Effort co-producing the film.

In April 2020, Disney scheduled Captain Marvel 2 for release on July 8, 2022, before moving it back to November 11, 2022, in December 2020. Also in December, they dated Guardians of the Galaxy Vol. 3 for 2023, and announced Ant-Man and the Wasp: Quantumania and a Fantastic Four film were in development, along with the Disney+ series Secret Invasion, Ironheart, and Armor Wars (later changed to a film). Feige indicated Secret Invasion and Ironheart would tie-in with future MCU films. These Disney+ series, plus Captain Marvel 2, Ant-Man and the Wasp: Quantumania, Guardians of the Galaxy Vol. 3, and Fantastic Four were believed to be a part of Phase Four at that time. By November 2020, development had begun on a second season of the television series Loki, which was formally confirmed in July 2021.

Development on a series centered on Echo as a spin-off from Hawkeye began by March 2021. By the end of April 2021, a fourth Captain America film was revealed to be in development as a continuation of the series The Falcon and the Winter Soldier (2021). In May 2021, Marvel Studios announced the title for Captain Marvel 2 as The Marvels, as well as the respective February 17 and May 5, 2023, release dates for Ant-Man and the Wasp: Quantumania and Guardians of the Galaxy Vol. 3. By June 2021, in addition to What If...?, Marvel Studios was developing a slate of at least three more animated series. In October 2021, Marvel Studios further adjusted The Marvels to February 17, 2023, and Ant-Man and the Wasp: Quantumania to July 28, 2023, only to swap their release dates in April 2022, because Quantumania was further along in production than The Marvels. Development on a series centered on Agatha Harkness as a spin-off from WandaVision began by October 2021. During the Disney+ Day event the following month, Marvel Studios officially announced Echo, Agatha: House of Harkness (later retitled Agatha All Along), and the animated Spider-Man prequel series titled Spider-Man: Freshman Year.

By March 2022, a reboot project of Marvel Television's Netflix series Daredevil (2015–2018) was revealed to be in development, and was confirmed to be in development for Disney+ in May. By June 2022, Marvel Studios was developing the film Thunderbolts*. Later that month, Feige said information on the next saga of the MCU would be provided in the following months, with Marvel Studios being a "little more direct" on their future plans to provide audiences with "the bigger picture [so they] can see a tiny, tiny bit more of the roadmap" following the clues included during Phase Four. At Marvel Studios' San Diego Comic-Con panel in July 2022, Feige announced that Black Panther: Wakanda Forever would conclude Phase Four, with the following films and series becoming part of Phase Five: Ant-Man and the Wasp: Quantumania, Guardians of the Galaxy Vol. 3, The Marvels, Secret Invasion, and Ironheart. Blade, the second season of Loki, Echo, and Agatha All Along were also confirmed for Phase Five, with Feige announcing the series Daredevil: Born Again and the films Captain America: New World Order and Thunderbolts*. He also announced that Phase Five, along with Phase Four and Phase Six, would be part of "The Multiverse Saga". By then, the second season of What If...? was also announced to release during this phase, while production had begun on five additional shorts for the series I Am Groot. Feige stated that many of the projects in Phase Four and Five, and their post-credit teases, would connect and lead towards the conclusion of the Multiverse Saga, while some would remain standalone. Feige described Quantumania as "a direct line" into the phase and the planned Phase Six film Avengers: The Kang Dynasty. In September, Reynolds announced that Deadpool & Wolverine would be released on September 6, 2024.

=== Production shifts and further work ===
In October 2022, Blade had its release date pushed back to the September 2024 slot, due to production-related issues, and Marvel Studios pushed back Deadpool & Wolverine to November 8, 2024, as a result. In December, Echo head writer Marion Dayre said the series would be delayed to late 2023, around that December. In early February 2023, Disney CEO Bob Iger announced that the company would be re-evaluating the volume of content it output as a way to cut costs over the next few years. Shortly after, when reflecting on the amount of Disney+ content released for Phase Four in a short time frame, Feige anticipated that Marvel Studios would look to space out the releases of the Phase Five and Six Disney+ series or put fewer out each year "so they can each get a chance to shine". At that time, the second season of Loki and Secret Invasion were still expected to release in 2023, while other projects in post-production, such as Echo and Ironheart, were unlikely to release that year as previously announced. The Marvels was also delayed to November 10, 2023. A month later, Iger said there was "nothing in any way inherently off in terms of the Marvel brand", and was not concerned with the volume of Marvel content being released. Rather, he believed there would be more of a benefit to shifting to new characters and stories, instead of producing third or fourth sequels with some characters.

The start of the 2023 Writers Guild of America strike in May 2023 resulted in production on Blade being paused until the strike concluded. Other MCU projects in production, or preparing to begin production, at that time—Captain America: New World Order, Agatha All Along, Thunderbolts*, and Deadpool & Wolverine—were not expected to be impacted by the strike, with Marvel Studios reportedly planning to shoot what they could during principal photography and make any necessary writing adjustments during each project's already scheduled reshoots. Picketers participating in the strike shut down a day of soundstage work for Daredevil: Born Again, and later location shooting, resulting in a temporary production pause. By the end of the month, production on Thunderbolts* was delayed until the strike concluded. In early June, Marvel revealed that New World Order had been retitled to Captain America: Brave New World. Later that month, Disney moved Deadpool & Wolverine forward to May 3, 2024, and delayed Brave New World to July 26, 2024, Thunderbolts* to December 20, 2024, and Blade to February 14, 2025, in part due to the writers' strike and Disney's intentions to improve the quality of MCU content from writing through post-production after disappointing reception and lower post COVID-19 pandemic box office earnings for some recently released films. Production on Born Again was also suspended until after the strike concluded. In July, production on Deadpool & Wolverine was suspended because of the 2023 SAG-AFTRA strike.

In August 2023, the second season of I Am Groot was announced to be released a month later on September 6, 2023, during the phase. In early September, Marvel Studios adjusted the release schedule for some of the television series in the phase, in part because of the ongoing WGA and SAG-AFTRA strikes and a desire to slow down their content output and make each of their titles "an event". The adjustments included dating the second season of What If...? for a late December 2023 release, delaying Echo to January 2024, delaying Agatha All Along to late 2024, and removing Ironheart and Born Again from the release schedule. Echo was set to be the first Marvel Studios series to simultaneously release on Hulu, being available for a limited time, as well as the first series under the "Marvel Spotlight" banner. When the SAG-AFTRA strike ended in November 2023, Disney delayed several films to accommodate the resumption of production. Deadpool & Wolverine was moved to July 26, 2024, Brave New World to February 14, 2025, Thunderbolts* to July 25, 2025, and Blade to November 7, 2025, making the latter set for release during Phase Six. In December 2023, Marvel Studios Animation announced that Freshman Year had been retitled Your Friendly Neighborhood Spider-Man, with it planned to be released in 2024.

In February 2024, Thunderbolts* was moved forward to May 2, 2025, swapping its release with Phase Six's The Fantastic Four. In May 2024, Iger said Disney planned to release two, or at most three, Marvel films and two Marvel series a year moving forward. This was down from up to four films and around four series being released in some recent years, and was part of the company's larger strategy to reduce its content output and focus on quality; at that time, four films were still planned to be released in 2025. He said Marvel content would continue to balance sequels with new franchises, and added that some upcoming series, including Agatha All Along, were "a vestige" of Disney's previous desire to increase Marvel's content output. A year later, Iger called Thunderbolts* the "first and best example" of Marvel Studios' refocusing efforts.

Also in May 2024, Marvel Studios revealed that its live-action Disney+ series would be released under a new "Marvel Television" banner, separate from the previous company of the same name, starting with Agatha All Along later in 2024. Animated series would be released under the "Marvel Animation" banner—not to be confused with the Marvel Animation subsidiary—which began with the first season of the studio's animated series X-Men '97 (2024). Winderbaum explained that Marvel Studios was now using the "Marvel Television", "Marvel Animation", and "Marvel Spotlight" banners to indicate to audiences that they did not have to watch all of the studio's projects to understand the overall story and could choose which storylines and characters under these banners to follow. In October 2024, Marvel Studios announced the release dates for their Disney+ projects through the end of 2024 and 2025, including the third season of What If...?, the first season of Your Friendly Neighborhood Spider-Man, the first season of Daredevil: Born Again, and Ironheart.

== Films ==
Phase Five films
Film	U.S. release date	Directed by	Screenplay by	Produced by
Ant-Man and the Wasp: Quantumania	February 17, 2023	Peyton Reed	Jeff Loveness	Kevin Feige and Stephen Broussard
Guardians of the Galaxy Vol. 3	May 5, 2023	James Gunn	James Gunn	Kevin Feige
The Marvels	November 10, 2023	Nia DaCosta	Nia DaCosta and Megan McDonnell and Elissa Karasik	Kevin Feige
Deadpool & Wolverine	July 26, 2024	Shawn Levy	Ryan Reynolds & Rhett Reese & Paul Wernick & Zeb Wells & Shawn Levy	Kevin Feige, Lauren Shuler Donner, Ryan Reynolds, and Shawn Levy
Captain America: Brave New World	February 14, 2025	Julius Onah	Rob Edwards and Malcolm Spellman & Dalan Musson and Julius Onah & Peter Glanz	Kevin Feige and Nate Moore
Thunderbolts* (Note: The asterisk denotes the alternate title, The New Avengers, as revealed in the film's end credits.)	May 2, 2025	Jake Schreier	Eric Pearson and Joanna Calo	Kevin Feige

=== Ant-Man and the Wasp: Quantumania (2023) ===
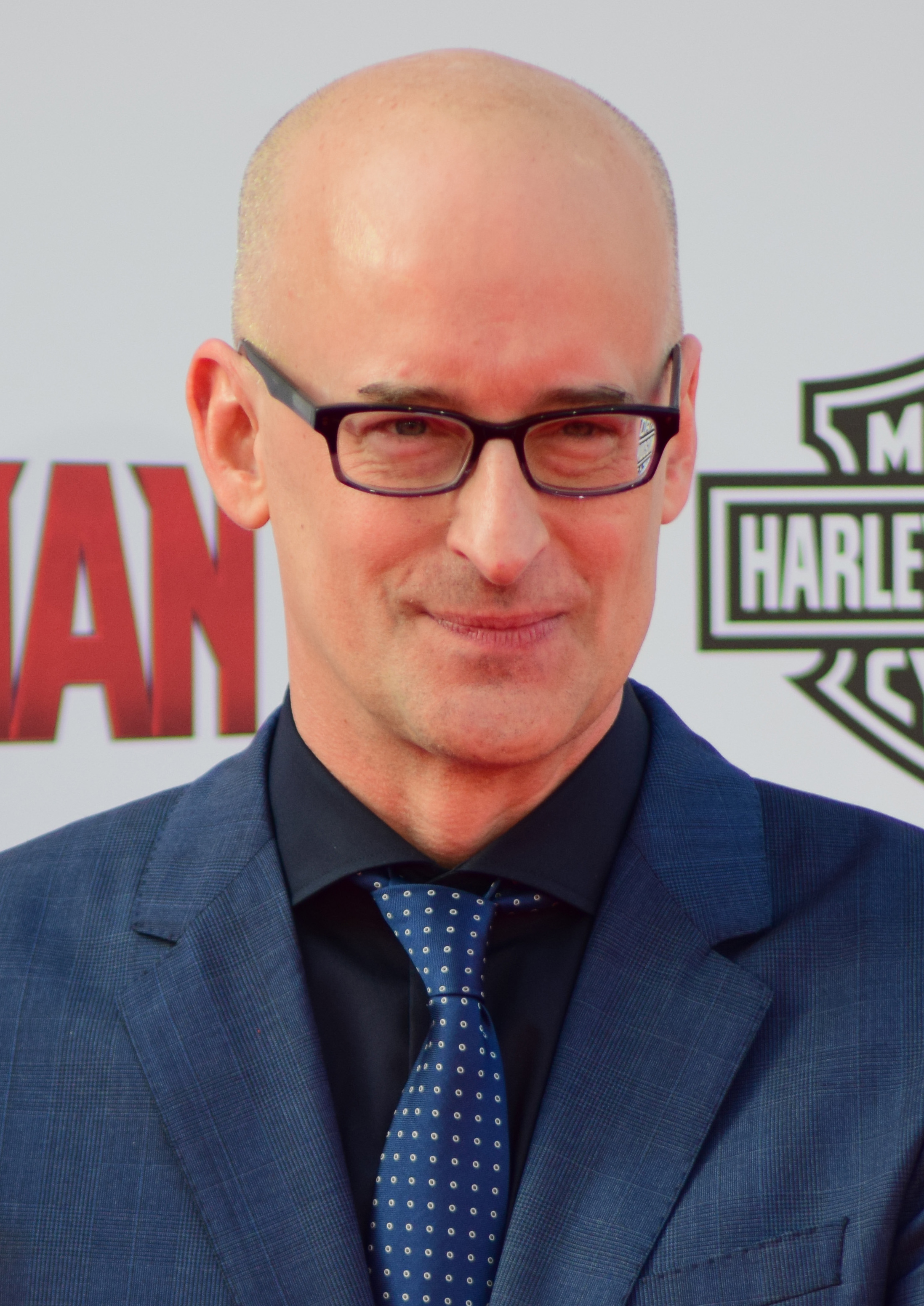
Peyton Reed, director of the Ant-Man films

Scott Lang and Hope van Dyne, along with Hope's parents Hank Pym and Janet van Dyne, and Lang's daughter Cassie, go on a new adventure exploring the Quantum Realm that pushes their limits and pits them against Kang the Conqueror.

Ahead of the release of Ant-Man and the Wasp (2018), the film's director Peyton Reed and Marvel Studios expected a sequel would be made and had discussed potential story points. A third Ant-Man film entered development by November 2019, with Reed returning as director, alongside Paul Rudd as Scott Lang / Ant-Man and Evangeline Lilly as Hope van Dyne / Wasp. Jeff Loveness was writing the script by April 2020, with the title and new cast members revealed that December. Principal photography began at the end of July 2021 at Pinewood Studios in Buckinghamshire, and ended that November, with additional filming in San Francisco and Turkey. Ant-Man and the Wasp: Quantumania premiered on February 6, 2023, and was released on February 17.

Ant-Man and the Wasp: Quantumania is set in 2026. Jonathan Majors portrays Kang the Conqueror, after first appearing as a variant of that character called He Who Remains in the first season of Loki (2021). Majors also portrays numerous Kang variants within the Council of Kangs, including Immortus, Rama-Tut, and Centurion in the film's mid-credits scene, and Victor Timely in the post-credits scene. The latter also features uncredited cameo appearances by Tom Hiddleston and Owen Wilson, reprising their respective roles of Loki and Mobius M. Mobius from Loki.

=== Guardians of the Galaxy Vol. 3 (2023) ===
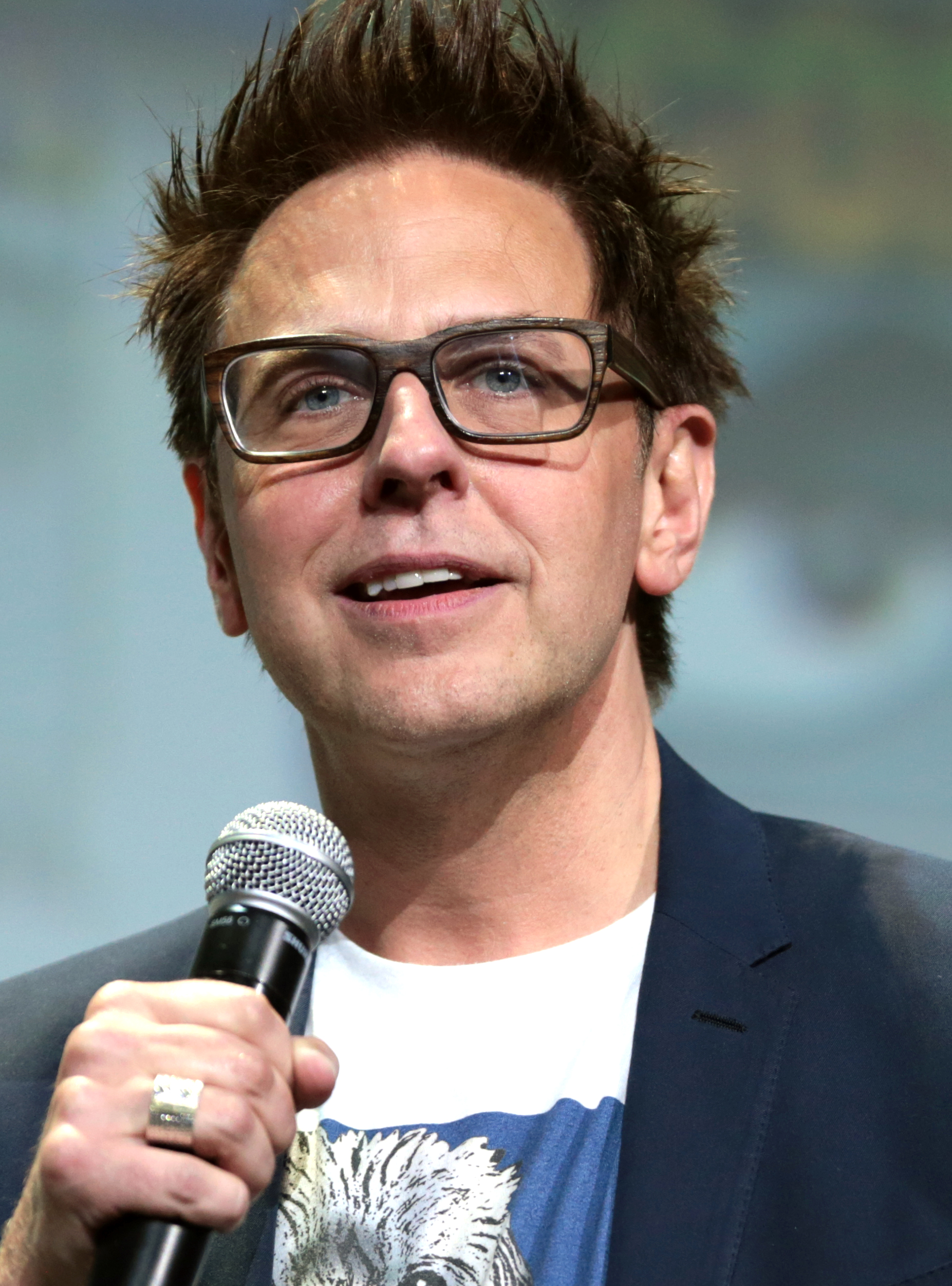
James Gunn, director of the Guardians of the Galaxy films

The Guardians of the Galaxy are adjusting to life on Knowhere, but when parts of Rocket's past resurface, Peter Quill must lead the Guardians on a dangerous mission to protect him that could lead to the team dissolving.

A third Guardians of the Galaxy film was planned by Marvel Studios in April 2016, with James Gunn returning to write and direct a year later. Disney fired him in July 2018 after controversial jokes he made resurfaced, but reversed course that October and reinstated Gunn as director. Gunn's return was revealed in March 2019, and was followed with confirmation of the five main stars' involvement. Kevin Feige confirmed the film was in development at the 2019 San Diego Comic-Con, and production began after Gunn completed his film The Suicide Squad (2021) and the first season of its spin-off series Peacemaker (2022). Filming began in November 2021, at Trilith Studios in Atlanta, and concluded in early May 2022. Guardians of the Galaxy Vol. 3 premiered on April 22, 2023, and was released on May 5.

Guardians of the Galaxy Vol. 3 is set after the events of The Guardians of the Galaxy Holiday Special (2022). Discussing the film's connections to the Multiverse Saga, Feige said Vol. 3 was focused more on concluding the story of the Guardians characters and "not about the bigger world-building", though still "a piece of the puzzle".

=== The Marvels (2023) ===
While investigating a wormhole linked to the Kree, Monica Rambeau's powers become entangled with those of Kamala Khan and Carol Danvers. The trio team up to determine why they are swapping places with each other every time they use their powers.

Feige confirmed a sequel to Captain Marvel (2019) was in development at the 2019 San Diego Comic-Con, with Megan McDonnell set to write the script and Brie Larson returning as Carol Danvers / Captain Marvel by January 2020. The studio wanted a female director for the film rather than have Anna Boden and Ryan Fleck return from the first, with Nia DaCosta hired to direct in August, and she co-wrote the script with Elissa Karasik. The film was announced with the title Captain Marvel 2 in December 2020, with the official title, The Marvels, revealed in May 2021. Principal photography had begun by August 2021 at Pinewood Studios in Buckinghamshire, with additional filming taking place at Longcross Studios in Surrey, New Jersey, Tropea, and Los Angeles. Filming wrapped by May 2022. The Marvels premiered on November 7, 2023, and was released on November 10.

The Marvels continues the story from Captain Marvel, and is set in 2026, after the events of the Disney+ series Secret Invasion and Ms. Marvel, with Iman Vellani, Saagar Shaikh, Zenobia Shroff, and Mohan Kapur reprising their respective roles as Kamala Khan / Ms. Marvel, Aamir Khan, Muneeba Khan, and Yusuf Khan from the latter series. Teyonah Parris returns as the adult Monica Rambeau from the series WandaVision (2021), after the character was previously portrayed as a child by Akira Akbar in Captain Marvel, while Lashana Lynch, Tessa Thompson, and Hailee Steinfeld reprise their MCU roles as Maria Rambeau, Valkyrie, and Kate Bishop. In the mid-credits scene, Kelsey Grammer appears as Hank McCoy / Beast, portraying an alternate version of the character he played in 20th Century Fox's X-Men films X-Men: The Last Stand (2006) and X-Men: Days of Future Past (2014), while Lynch appears as an alternate version of Maria who is known as Binary.

=== Deadpool & Wolverine (2024) ===
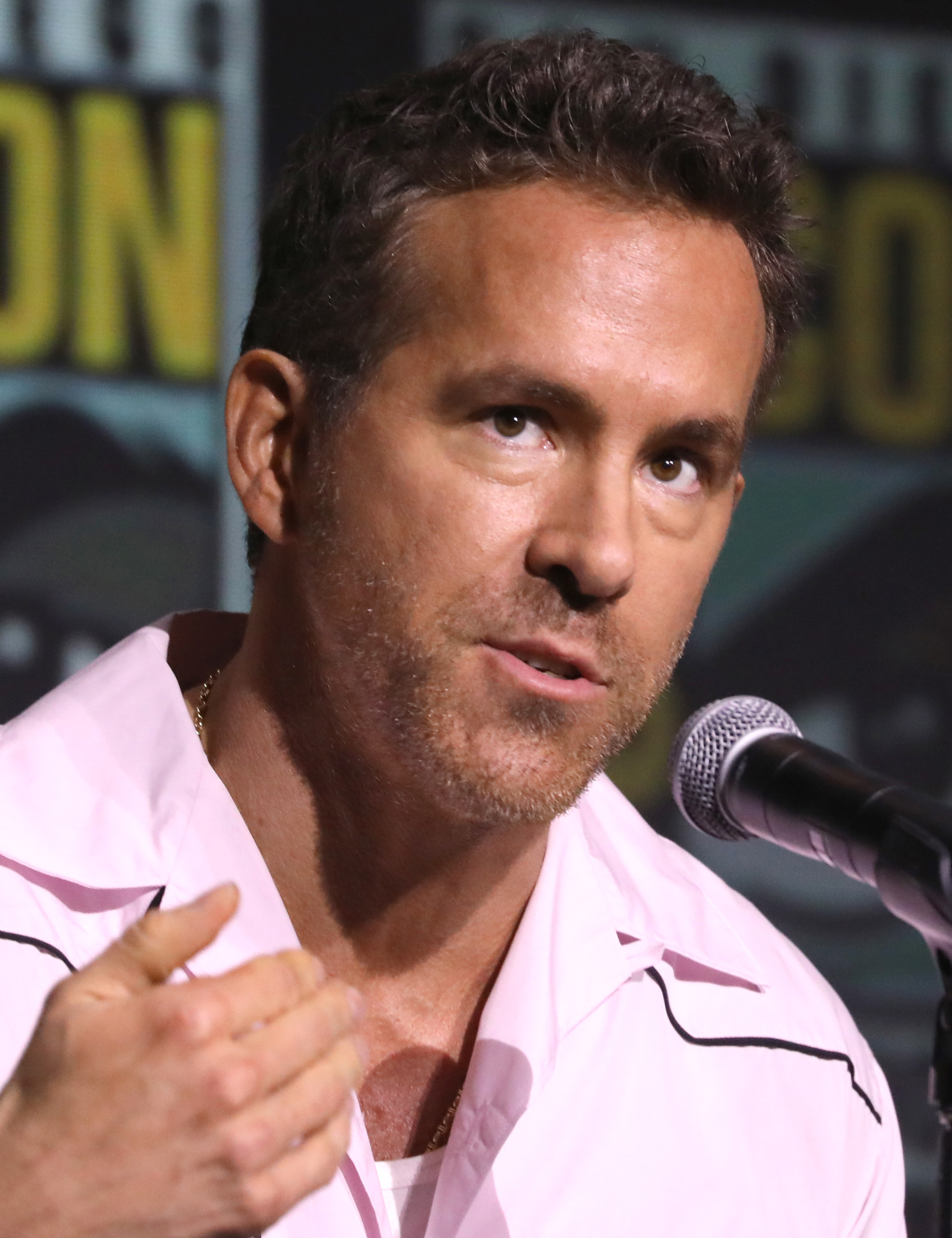
Ryan Reynolds, a star, writer, and producer of Deadpool & Wolverine

Wade Wilson lives a quiet life, having left his time as the mercenary Deadpool behind him, until the Time Variance Authority (TVA) pulls him into a new mission. With his home universe, Earth-10005, facing an existential threat, Wilson reluctantly joins forces with an even more reluctant Wolverine on a mission that will change the history of the MCU.

After the acquisition of 21st Century Fox by Disney was announced in December 2017, Disney CEO Bob Iger said Ryan Reynolds would reprise his role as Wade Wilson / Deadpool from Fox's R-rated X-Men films Deadpool (2016) and Deadpool 2 (2018) in the PG-13–rated MCU. By December 2019, Reynolds confirmed a third Deadpool film was in development at Marvel Studios, with Wendy Molyneux and Lizzie Molyneux-Logelin writing the film by November 2020. The film is set in the MCU and retains the R-rating, the first MCU film to do so. By March 2022, Shawn Levy was hired to direct while the first two films' writers, Rhett Reese and Paul Wernick, were rewriting the script, doing so with Zeb Wells, Reynolds, and Levy; the latter two also produced through their respective production companies Maximum Effort and 21 Laps Entertainment, alongside X-Men film series producer Lauren Shuler Donner. Hugh Jackman co-stars as James "Logan" Howlett / Wolverine, reprising the role from the X-Men films. Filming began in late May 2023 at Pinewood Studios in Buckinghamshire, England, but was suspended in July due to the 2023 SAG-AFTRA strike. Production resumed in late November after the strike ended, and wrapped in January 2024, with the film's title revealed the next month. Feige said the film would be the start of the MCU's "Mutant era". Deadpool & Wolverine premiered on July 22, 2024, and was released on July 26.

Deadpool & Wolverine is set in 2024, six years after the events of Deadpool 2, largely on Earth-10005 and in the Void; it occurs after the events of the second season of Loki. Returning from the previous Deadpool films are Morena Baccarin as Vanessa, Rob Delaney as Peter, Leslie Uggams as Blind Al, Karan Soni as Dopinder, Brianna Hildebrand as Negasonic Teenage Warhead, Shioli Kutsuna as Yukio, Stefan Kapičić as the voice of Colossus, and Lewis Tan as Shatterstar, with Aaron Stanford, Dafne Keen, and Tyler Mane reprising their respective roles as Pyro, Laura / X-23, and Sabretooth from the X-Men film series. Also reprising their roles from other Marvel films are Jennifer Garner as Elektra Natchios from Fox's Daredevil (2003) and Elektra (2005); Wesley Snipes as Eric Brooks / Blade from New Line Cinema's Blade film trilogy (1998–2004); and Chris Evans (who portrayed Steve Rogers / Captain America in the MCU) as Johnny Storm / Human Torch from Fox's Fantastic Four (2005) and Fantastic Four: Rise of the Silver Surfer (2007). Channing Tatum appears as Remy LeBeau / Gambit, after having been attached to star as the character in an unproduced Gambit film. Jon Favreau reprises his MCU role of Harold "Happy" Hogan, as does Wunmi Mosaku as Hunter B-15 from Loki, with the TVA and the creature Alioth from that series also featured in the film, along with the Hulk.

=== Captain America: Brave New World (2025) ===
Sam Wilson finds himself at the center of an international incident and must work to stop the true brains behind it.

A fourth Captain America film was revealed to be in development in April 2021, with Malcolm Spellman and Dalan Musson co-writing the script. The duo previously served as head writer and a staff writer, respectively, on the Disney+ miniseries The Falcon and the Winter Soldier (2021). Rob Edwards also served as a credited writer, and said he was the original writer for the film. Anthony Mackie joined by that August, to headline the film as Sam Wilson / Captain America. Julius Onah was hired to direct Captain America: New World Order in July 2022, and rewrote the screenplay with Peter Glanz. The film explores the effects of becoming Captain America on Wilson. Filming began in March 2023, taking place at Trilith Studios in Atlanta and in Washington, D.C., and lasted until June, at which point the subtitle was changed to Brave New World. Matthew Orton was hired in December to write for additional photography, which lasted from May to November 2024. Captain America: Brave New World premiered on February 11, 2025, and was released on February 14.

Captain America: Brave New World begins in November 2026, two years after The Falcon and the Winter Soldier, and is set primarily in the first few months of 2027. Danny Ramirez and Carl Lumbly reprise their respective roles of Joaquin Torres / Falcon and Isaiah Bradley from The Falcon and the Winter Soldier, alongside Tim Blake Nelson as Samuel Sterns and Liv Tyler as Betty Ross from The Incredible Hulk (2008). Harrison Ford replaces William Hurt (who died in 2022) in the role of Thaddeus Ross, who turns into Red Hulk in the film. Sebastian Stan has an uncredited cameo appearance in his MCU role of Bucky Barnes, after co-starring with Mackie in The Falcon and the Winter Soldier. The remains of Tiamut, a Celestial from Eternals (2021), are featured in the film, with it revealed to be a source of adamantium, which is introduced to the MCU. Sterns warns Wilson in the post-credits scene of a coming attack from other worlds in the multiverse.

=== Thunderbolts* (2025) ===
The Thunderbolts, a group of antiheroes, are caught in a deadly trap and forced into a dangerous mission that could redeem them if they unite as a team.

A Thunderbolts film was in development by June 2022, with Eric Pearson writing the screenplay, and Jake Schreier attached to direct. In September, the Thunderbolts team was announced to include Florence Pugh as Yelena Belova, Sebastian Stan as Bucky Barnes, Wyatt Russell as U.S. Agent, David Harbour as Red Guardian, and Hannah John-Kamen as Ghost, all reprising their roles from previous MCU projects. Lee Sung Jin and Joanna Calo joined the film to rewrite the script by March 2023 and February 2024, respectively, though only Pearson and Calo were credited. Filming began later that month, taking place at Trilith Studios and Atlanta Metro Studios in Atlanta, as well as in Utah. Filming wrapped in June 2024. Thunderbolts* premiered on April 22, 2025, and was released on May 2. The asterisk denotes the alternate title, The New Avengers, as revealed in the film's end credits.

Thunderbolts* is set in 2027, after the events of Captain America: Brave New World. Olga Kurylenko and Julia Louis-Dreyfus reprise their respective roles as Antonia Dreykov / Taskmaster and Valentina Allegra de Fontaine from previous MCU media; the latter rebrands the Thunderbolts as the New Avengers, which include Lewis Pullman as Bob Reynolds / Sentry, at the end of the film. The post-credits scene, set 14 months later, sees the Fantastic Four's extradimensional spacecraft entering Earth-616; it was directed by Anthony and Joe Russo on the set of Avengers: Doomsday (2026), with the scene intended for that film.

== Television series ==
All the series in Phase Five were released exclusively on Disney+ except Echo, which was released simultaneously on Disney+ and Hulu and was available on Hulu until April 9, 2024.

Television series of Phase Five
Series	Season	Episodes	Originally released		Production division / label (Note: Marvel Studios introduced several new labels and banners under which its series are released, starting in 2024.)	Head writer(s) / showrunner (Note: By October 2023, Marvel Studios shifted their creative philosophy to a more traditional television development process, moving away from head writers and beginning to hire dedicated showrunners for their series. The showrunner title applies to Jac Schaeffer on Agatha All Along and Dario Scardapane on Daredevil: Born Again, while Jeff Trammell served as both the head writer and showrunner of Your Friendly Neighborhood Spider-Man.)	Lead director(s)
Series	Season	Episodes	First released	Last released	Production division / label	Head writer(s) / showrunner	Lead director(s)
Secret Invasion	1	6	June 21, 2023	July 26, 2023	—N/a	Kyle Bradstreet (Note: During production of Secret Invasion, Bradstreet was replaced as writer by Brian Tucker, who received the majority of the writing credits on the series.)	Ali Selim
Loki	2	6	October 5, 2023	November 9, 2023	—N/a	Eric Martin	Justin Benson & Aaron Moorhead
What If...?	2	9	December 22, 2023	December 30, 2023	Marvel Studios Animation	A.C. Bradley	Bryan Andrews
What If...?	3	8	December 22, 2024	December 29, 2024	Marvel Animation	Matthew Chauncey	Stephan Franck and Bryan Andrews
Echo	1	5	January 9, 2024		Marvel Spotlight	Marion Dayre and Amy Rardin	Sydney Freeland
Agatha All Along	1	9	September 18, 2024	October 30, 2024	Marvel Television	Jac Schaeffer	Jac Schaeffer
Your Friendly Neighborhood Spider-Man	1	10	January 29, 2025	February 19, 2025	Marvel Animation	Jeff Trammell	Mel Zwyer
Daredevil: Born Again	1	9	March 4, 2025	April 15, 2025	Marvel Television	Dario Scardapane	Justin Benson & Aaron Moorhead
Ironheart	1	6	June 24, 2025	July 1, 2025	Marvel Television	Chinaka Hodge	Sam Bailey and Angela Barnes

=== Secret Invasion (2023) ===
Nick Fury works with Talos, a shapeshifting alien Skrull, to uncover a conspiracy by a group of renegade Skrulls led by Gravik who plan to gain control of Earth by posing as different humans around the world.

By September 2020, Marvel Studios was developing a series centered on Nick Fury, with Samuel L. Jackson reprising his role and Kyle Bradstreet serving as head writer. That December, Marvel Studios revealed the series to be an adaptation of the Secret Invasion comic book storyline starring Jackson alongside Ben Mendelsohn as Talos. Filming had begun by September 2021 in London, with Ali Selim directing the series. Filming concluded in late April 2022. Additional filming occurred across West Yorkshire and in Liverpool, England. During production, much of the series' creative team was replaced, with Brian Tucker taking over as writer from Bradstreet and co-director Thomas Bezucha exiting. Extensive reshoots lasted from mid-June to late September 2022. Secret Invasion premiered on June 21, 2023, and consisted of six episodes, concluding on July 26, 2023.

Secret Invasion is set around 2026, thirty years after the events of Captain Marvel. Reprising their roles from previous MCU media are Don Cheadle, Cobie Smulders, Martin Freeman, and O-T Fagbenle as James "Rhodey" Rhodes, Maria Hill, Everett K. Ross, and Rick Mason, respectively. Emilia Clarke plays an adult version of G'iah, who appeared as Talos' unnamed child in Captain Marvel, played by Auden L. Ophuls and Harriet L. Ophuls. Charlotte Baker and Kate Braithwaite appear as Talos' wife Soren, who was portrayed by Sharon Blynn in Captain Marvel and Spider-Man: Far From Home (2019).

=== Loki season 2 (2023) ===
After the events of the first season, Loki teams up with Mobius M. Mobius, Hunter B-15, and other Time Variance Authority agents "in a battle for the soul" of the TVA. He continues to explore the multiverse in search of Sylvie, Ravonna Renslayer, and Miss Minutes.

The first season of Loki premiered in June 2021. Development on a second season had begun by November 2020, with season one head writer Michael Waldron expected to be involved by January 2021. The season was officially confirmed in July 2021, along with Tom Hiddleston returning to star as Loki. By February 2022, Eric Martin was set to write the season, with Waldron as an executive producer. Filming began in mid-June 2022, at Pinewood Studios in the United Kingdom, with Justin Benson and Aaron Moorhead directing the majority of episodes, and Dan DeLeeuw and Kasra Farahani also directing. Shooting concluded that October. The second season of Loki premiered on October 5, 2023, and ran for six episodes, concluding on November 9.

The second season begins immediately after the first-season finale, taking place outside of time and space while some events occur between the past, present, and future. Jonathan Majors reprises his role as Victor Timely from Ant-Man and the Wasp: Quantumania.

=== What If...? seasons 2 and 3 (2023–24) ===
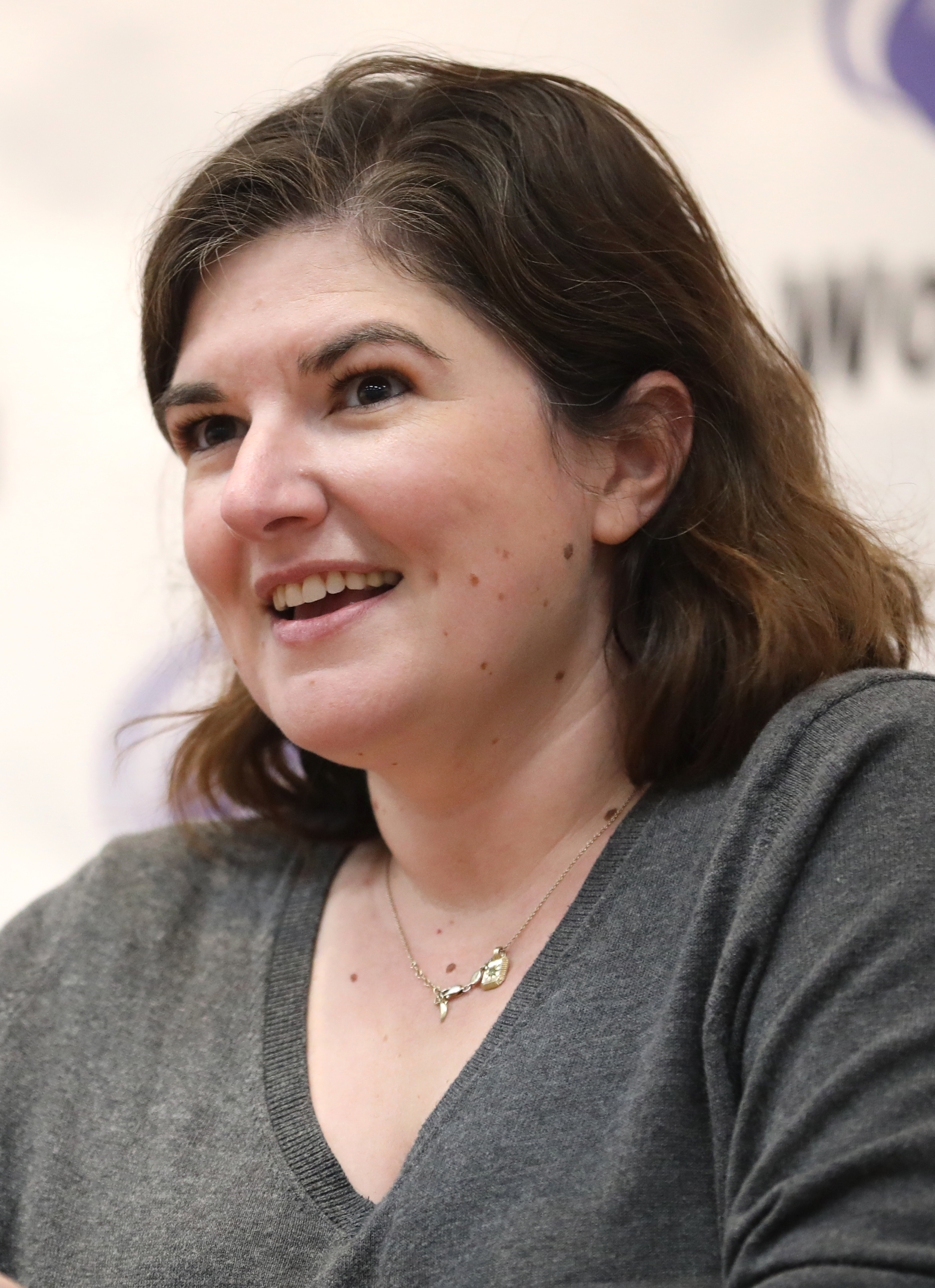
A. C. Bradley, head writer of the first two seasons of What If...?

Following the formation of the Guardians of the Multiverse, the Watcher continues to meet new heroes and strange worlds in the Marvel Cinematic Universe multiverse.

The first season of What If...? premiered in August 2021. In December 2019, Marvel Studios Animation had begun work on the second season, while a third season was confirmed in July 2022. A. C. Bradley returned as head writer for the second season, with series' story editor Matthew Chauncey revealed in December 2023 to be taking over as head writer for the third. For both seasons, Bryan Andrews returned as lead director, with Stephan Franck also directing, while Jeffrey Wright returned to narrate the seasons as the Watcher. The second season debuted on December 22, 2023, and consists of nine episodes released daily until December 30, while the third season premiered on December 22, 2024, and consists of eight episodes also released daily until December 29.

The second season's final episode includes the multiverse tree established in the Loki season two finale. Many actors from the films voice their respective characters in both seasons.

=== Echo (2024) ===
Maya Lopez returns to her hometown after the events in New York City, where she must come to terms with her past, while reconnecting with her Native American roots, and embrace her family and community.

Development on a spin-off from the series Hawkeye (2021) starring Alaqua Cox as Maya Lopez / Echo began by March 2021, with Etan Cohen and Emily Cohen set to write and executive produce. Echo was officially announced that November, when Marion Dayre was revealed to be serving as head writer; Dayre serves as head writer along with Amy Rardin. Filming began in late April 2022, and concluded in late August, occurring throughout Metro Atlanta, Peachtree City, Social Circle, and Grantville, Georgia, with Sydney Freeland and Catriona McKenzie directing episodes of the series. Echo was released in its entirety simultaneously on Disney+ and Hulu on January 9, 2024, as part of the "Marvel Spotlight" banner, and consists of five episodes. The series was available on Hulu until April 9, 2024.

Echo is set five months after the events of Hawkeye in May 2025, and leads into the events of Daredevil: Born Again. Zahn McClarnon reprises his role as William Lopez from Hawkeye, along with Vincent D'Onofrio as Wilson Fisk / Kingpin and Charlie Cox as Matt Murdock / Daredevil from previous MCU media. Jeremy Renner appears as Clint Barton / Ronin through archive footage from Hawkeye, while Richie Palmer, Sr. and ML Gemmill respectively voice Fisk's parents Bill and Marlene Fisk, replacing Domenick Lombardozzi and Angela Reed, who portrayed the characters in the first season of Daredevil (2015).

=== Agatha All Along (2024) ===
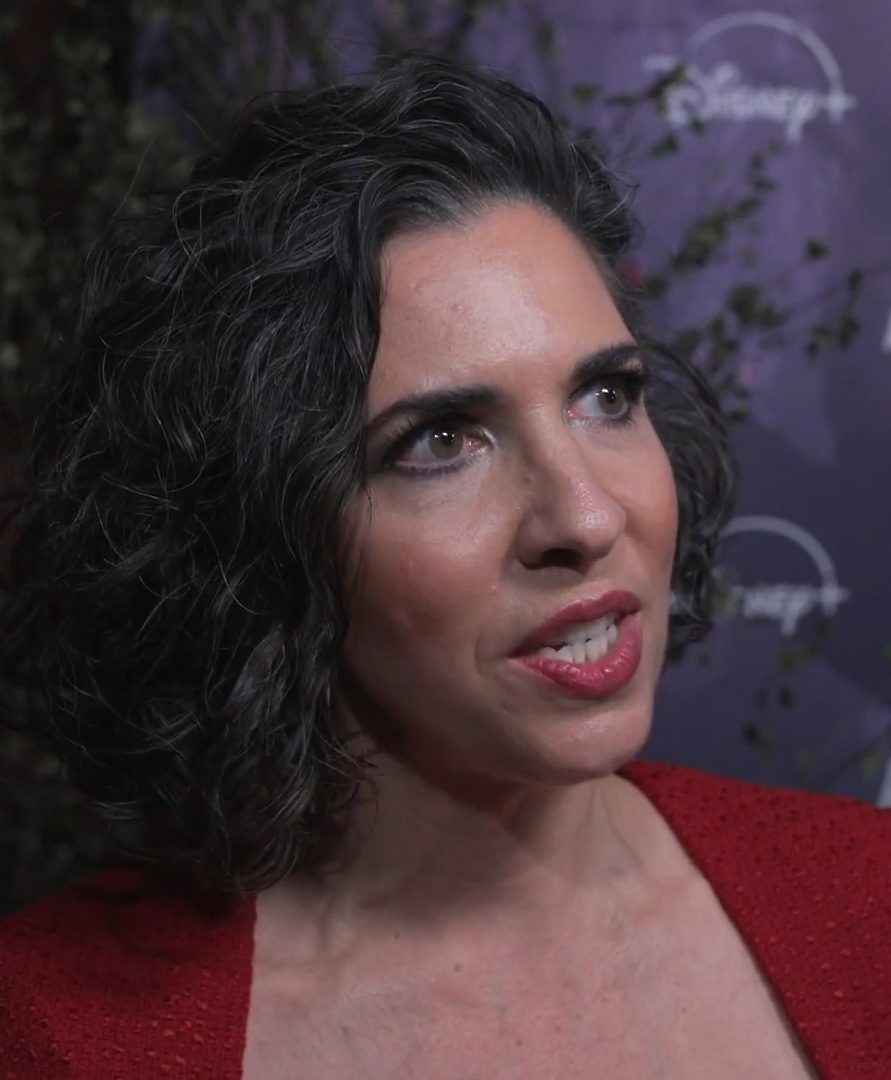
Jac Schaeffer, head writer of WandaVision and showrunner and lead director of Agatha All Along

After being trapped in the town of Westview, New Jersey, the witch Agatha Harkness escapes with the help of a goth teen who wishes to face the trials of the legendary Witches' Road. Without her magical powers, Harkness and the teen form a new coven of witches to face the trials with.

Development on a spin-off series from WandaVision starring Kathryn Hahn as Agatha Harkness began by October 2021, with Jac Schaeffer set as head writer and executive producer; Schaeffer was serving as the showrunner by July 2024. The series was initially announced in November 2021 as Agatha: House of Harkness, but was ultimately titled Agatha All Along. Filming began in mid-January 2023, at Trilith Studios in Atlanta, with Schaeffer, Rachel Goldberg, and Gandja Monteiro directing episodes of the series. Filming concluded by late May. Agatha All Along premiered on September 18, 2024, and consists of nine episodes, concluding on October 30. It is intended to be the second series in a trilogy following WandaVision and preceding VisionQuest (2026).

Agatha All Along is set in 2026, three years after the events of WandaVision. Joe Locke portrays the goth teen, later revealed to be William Kaplan, whose body is used by the soul of Billy Maximoff. Billy was played by Julian Hilliard in WandaVision and Doctor Strange in the Multiverse of Madness (2022). Several actors reprise their WandaVision roles, including Debra Jo Rupp as Sharon Davis, Evan Peters as Ralph Bohner, Emma Caulfield Ford as Sarah Proctor, David Payton as John Collins, David Lengel as Harold Proctor, Asif Ali as Abilash Tandon, Amos Glick as a pizza delivery man, and Kate Forbes as Evanora Harkness.

=== Your Friendly Neighborhood Spider-Man season 1 (2025) ===
Peter Parker's origin story and early days using the Spider-Man persona are explored while Norman Osborn becomes his mentor.

In November 2021, the animated series Spider-Man: Freshman Year was announced, with Jeff Trammell serving as head writer and executive producer. The series features a style that "celebrates" and pays homage to the early Spider-Man comics. Mel Zwyer served as supervising director and the first episode's director, with Liza Singer and Stu Livingston directors for the remaining episodes. Hudson Thames voices Parker, after previously doing so in What If...?. The series was retitled Your Friendly Neighborhood Spider-Man by December 2023. The first season of Your Friendly Neighborhood Spider-Man premiered on January 29, 2025, and ran for ten episodes, concluding on February 19. A second season, originally announced as Spider-Man: Sophomore Year, will be released in 2027 as part of Phase Six, while a third season is also in development.

Your Friendly Neighborhood Spider-Man is set in an alternate reality from the main MCU continuity, in which Norman Osborn is Peter Parker's mentor instead of Tony Stark, around the time of the events of Captain America: Civil War (2016). Charlie Cox and Zach Cherry reprise their respective MCU roles as Matt Murdock / Daredevil and Klev, while other characters from previous MCU media appearing include May Parker (voiced by Kari Wahlgren); Dr. Stephen Strange (Robin Atkin Downes); Carla Connors (Zehra Fazal), who is a gender-bent Curt Connors; Otto Octavius (Hugh Dancy); Mac Gargan / Scorpion (Jonathan Medina); Stark (Mick Wingert); and Thaddeus Ross (Travis Willingham). Nico Minoru, who appeared in the Marvel Television series Runaways (2017–2019), also appears and is voiced by Grace Song.

=== Daredevil: Born Again season 1 (2025) ===
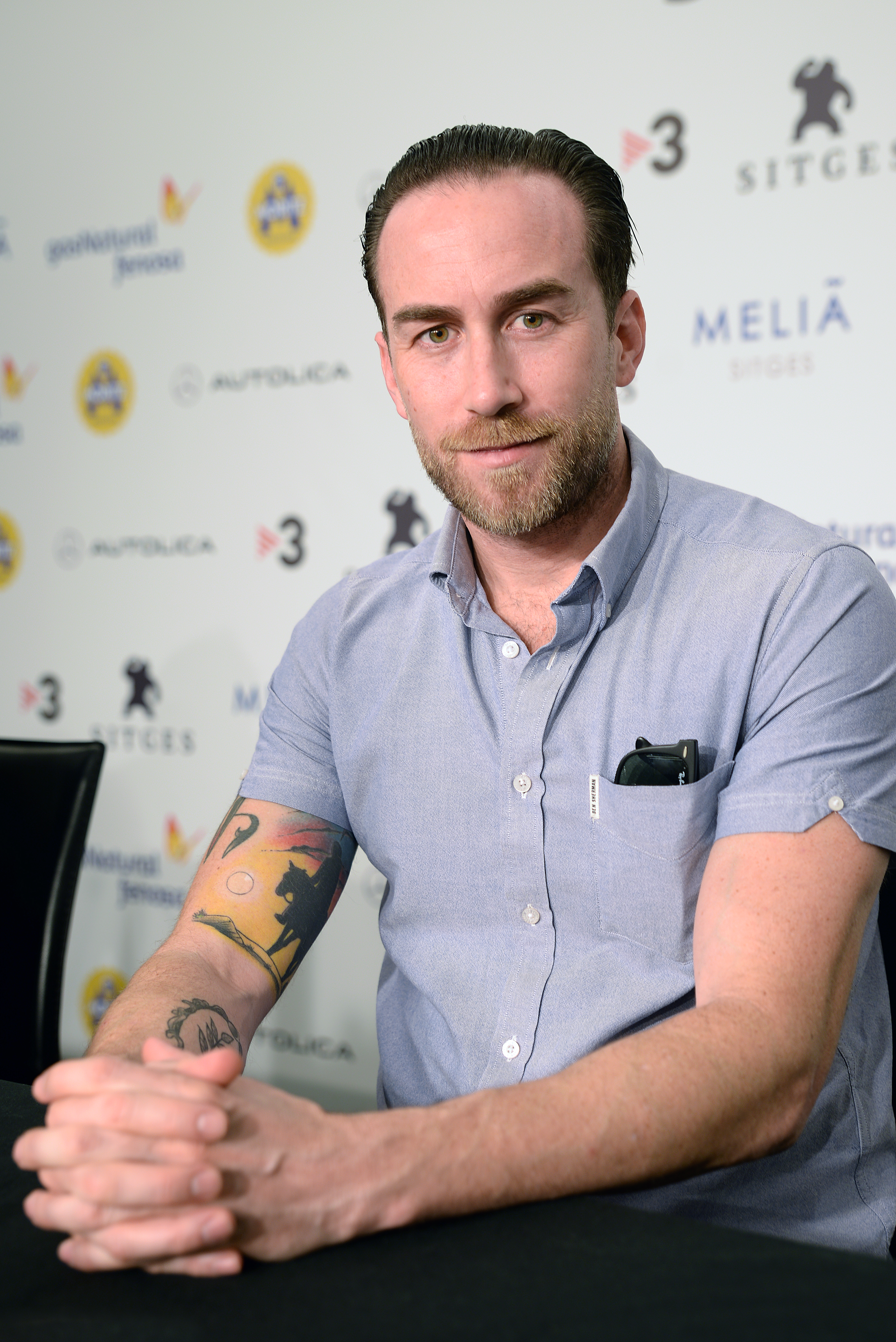
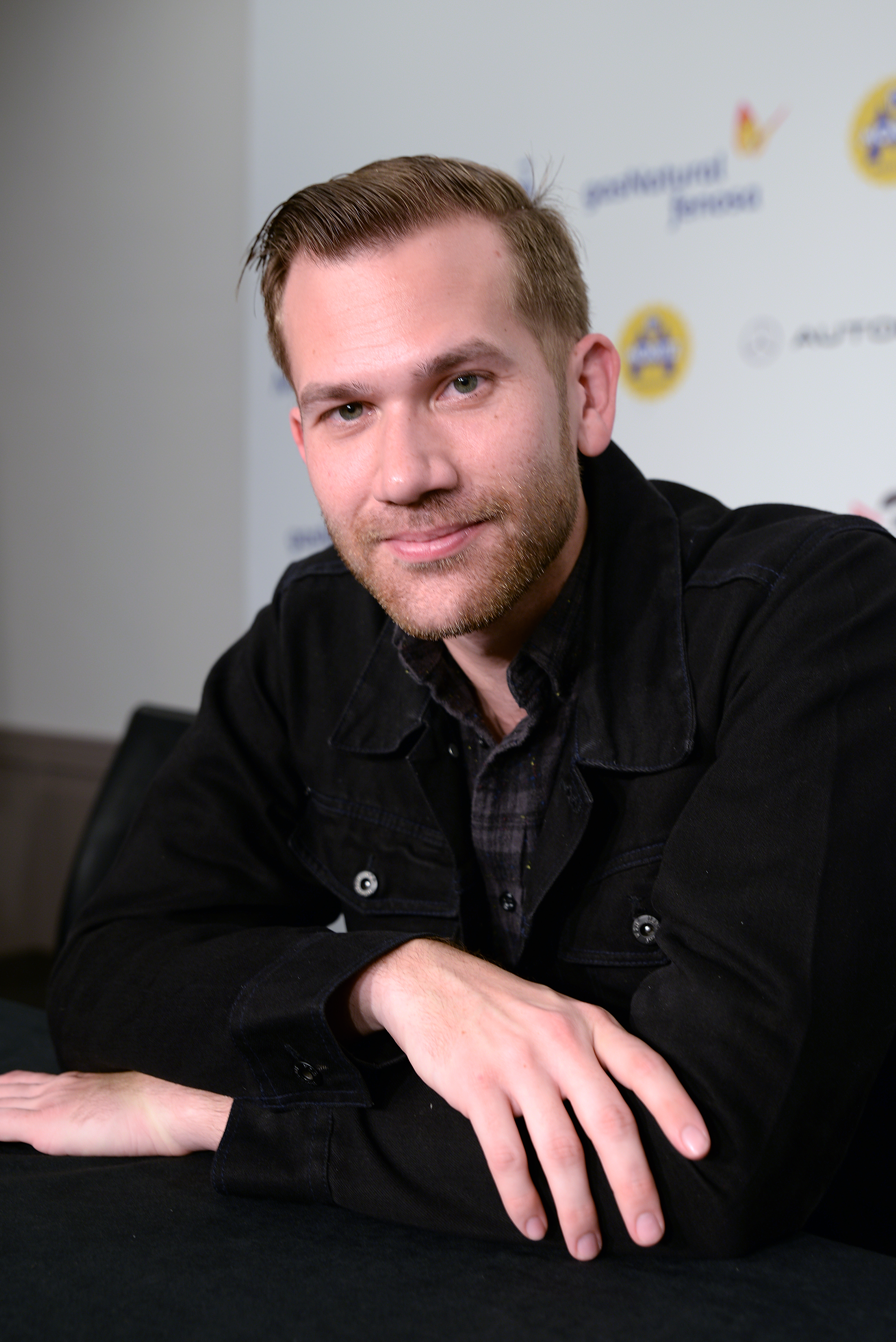
Justin Benson and Aaron Moorhead, lead directors of Loki season 2 and Daredevil: Born Again

Matt Murdock fights for justice while Wilson Fisk pursues his campaign as the mayor of New York City, causing their past identities to collide.

Disney regained the rights to the Marvel Television series Daredevil (2015–2018) from Netflix in March 2022 and it began streaming on Disney+. Marvel Studios was developing a new Daredevil series by then, with Matt Corman and Chris Ord hired as head writers and executive producers in May. The series was announced in July with Charlie Cox returning as Matt Murdock / Daredevil and Vincent D'Onofrio returning as Wilson Fisk / Kingpin. Filming began in early March 2023, on location in New York, and also occurred at Silvercup Studios East. Production was suspended in June due to the writers' strike, with six of the series' episodes largely filmed. By late September 2023, Marvel Studios decided to creatively overhaul the series to bring it closer to the tone of the Netflix series, replacing Corman and Ord as head writers and releasing the remaining directors, with some elements already shot planned to be retained. The following month, Dario Scardapane was hired to serve as the showrunner, writing three new episodes including a new pilot as well as scenes for episodes already shot, while the duo of Justin Benson and Aaron Moorhead were hired to direct the remaining episodes. With the creative overhaul, it was decided that the planned 18-episode season would be split into two seasons. Filming resumed in January 2024, and wrapped in April. Michael Cuesta, Jeffrey Nachmanoff, and David Boyd served as credited directors of the season from their work on the original six episodes. The first season of Daredevil: Born Again premiered on March 4, 2025, and consists of nine episodes, concluding on April 15. A second season debuted in March 2026, as part of Phase Six.

Daredevil: Born Again is set after the events of Echo, with a prologue in the first episode set in late 2025, before jumping ahead a year to late 2026 and continuing into early 2027. Mohan Kapur and Tony Dalton reprise their respective roles as Yusuf Khan and Jack Duquesne / Swordsman from previous MCU media, along with Deborah Ann Woll as Karen Page, Elden Henson as Foggy Nelson, Wilson Bethel as Benjamin "Dex" Poindexter / Bullseye, Ayelet Zurer as Vanessa Marianna-Fisk, Jon Bernthal as Frank Castle / Punisher, and Susan Varon as Josie from Marvel's Netflix television series.

=== Ironheart (2025) ===
MIT student Riri Williams returns home to Chicago where she discovers secrets that pit technology against magic, setting her on a path of danger and adventure.

In December 2020, Marvel Studios announced a series centered on Riri Williams / Ironheart was in development starring Dominique Thorne, reprising her role from the film Black Panther: Wakanda Forever. Chinaka Hodge was hired as head writer in April 2021. Coogler produces the series through Proximity Media. Filming had begun by early June 2022, at Trilith Studios in Atlanta, with Sam Bailey and Angela Barnes directing episodes of the series. Filming also occurred in Chicago by late October, and concluded in early November. Ironheart premiered with its first three episodes on June 24, 2025, followed by its other three episodes on July 1.

Ironheart is set six months after the events of Black Panther: Wakanda Forever around October 2025. Sacha Baron Cohen appears as the demon Mephisto, who had been teased to appear in the MCU since WandaVision.

== Shorts ==
=== I Am Groot season 2 (2023) ===
Series	Season	Episodes	Originally released		Writer and director
Series	Season	Episodes	First released	Last released	Writer and director
I Am Groot	2	5	September 6, 2023		Kirsten Lepore

Each short follows Baby Groot as he explores the universe beyond the confines of the Guardians of the Galaxy's ship, going on adventures with new and unusual characters that get him into trouble.

The first five shorts of I Am Groot premiered in August 2022. Production on five additional shorts was underway by July 2022, described as a second season. Kirsten Lepore returns as head writer, director, and executive producer, with Vin Diesel once again voicing Baby Groot. The second season of I Am Groot premiered with five shorts on Disney+ on September 6, 2023.

Jeffrey Wright reprises his role as the Watcher from What If...? in the season.

== Timeline ==
Key:
- Occurs on the MCU's Sacred Timeline
- Occurs outside the MCU's Sacred Timeline at a set timeframe

Marvel Cinematic Universe: Phase Five timeline Full timeline at Marvel Cinematic Universe timeline (Note: The second season of Loki and the second and third seasons of What If ...? are excluded from the diagram because they occur outside of the main timeline and in alternate timelines respectively. Disney+'s timeline order places their second seasons after The Marvels and the third season of What If...? after Agatha All Along.) Titles in parentheses are included for reference
1995	(Captain Marvel)
1996–2013	
2014	I Am Groot eps. 6–10
2015	
2016	(Civil War)
2016	Your Friendly Neighborhood; Spider-Man season 1
2017–2022	
2023	(WandaVision)
2024	Deadpool & Wolverine
2024	(Hawkeye)
2025	(Wakanda Forever)
2025	Echo
2025	Ironheart
2025	(The Guardians of the Galaxy; Holiday Special)
2026	Quantumania
2026	Guardians of the Galaxy Vol. 3
2026	Secret Invasion
2026	The Marvels
2026	Agatha All Along
2026	Daredevil: Born Again season 1 ep. 1
2027	Daredevil: Born Again season 1 eps. 2–9
2027	Brave New World
2027	Thunderbolts*

Echo is set five months after the events of Hawkeye, in May 2025. Ant-Man and the Wasp: Quantumania is set in 2026. Guardians of the Galaxy Vol. 3 is set after the events of The Guardians of the Galaxy Holiday Special. Secret Invasion is set around 2026, thirty years after the events of Captain Marvel. The Marvels is set in 2026, after Secret Invasion and Ms. Marvel. Agatha All Along is set in 2026, three years after the events of WandaVision. Captain America: Brave New World begins in November 2026, two years after The Falcon and the Winter Soldier, and is set primarily in the first few months of 2027. Daredevil: Born Again is set after Echo, with a prologue in the first episode set in late 2025, before jumping ahead a year to late 2026 and continuing into early 2027. Thunderbolts* is set later in 2027, after Brave New World. Ironheart is set six months after the events of Black Panther: Wakanda Forever around October 2025.

The second season of Loki begins immediately after the first-season finale, taking place outside of time and space while some events occur between the past, present, and future. Deadpool & Wolverine is set in 2024, six years after the events of Deadpool 2, largely on Earth-10005 and in the Void; it occurs after the events of Loki season 2. The first season of Your Friendly Neighborhood Spider-Man is set outside the Sacred Timeline in an alternate reality set around the events of Civil War.

== Recurring cast and characters ==
List indicators

This section includes characters who have appeared in multiple Phase Five films or series, and have appeared in the billing block for at least one film or have been a starring cast member for at least one series.

- A dark grey cell indicates the character was not in the films or series.
- An ^{A} indicates an appearance through archival footage.
- A ^{C} indicates an uncredited cameo role.
- A ^{V} indicates a voice-only role.

Characters are listed alphabetically by last name, as applicable.

Recurring cast and characters of Phase Five
Character	Films	Television series	Animation
Bucky Barnes	Sebastian Stan		Sebastian Stan^{V}
Clint Barton Hawkeye / Ronin		Jeremy Renner^{A}	Jeremy Renner^{V}
Kate Bishop	Hailee Steinfeld		Hailee Steinfeld^{V}
Wilson Fisk Kingpin		Vincent D'Onofrio	
Nick Fury	Samuel L. Jackson	Samuel L. Jackson	Samuel L. Jackson^{V}
Gamora	Zoë Saldaña		Cynthia McWilliams^{V}
Groot	Vin Diesel^{V}		Vin Diesel^{V} Fred Tatasciore^{V}
Agatha Harkness		Kathryn Hahn	Kathryn Hahn^{V}
Maria Hill		Cobie Smulders	Cobie Smulders^{V}
Happy Hogan	Jon Favreau		Jon Favreau^{V}
Howard the Duck	Seth Green^{V}		Seth Green^{V}
Yusuf Khan	Mohan Kapur	Mohan Kapur	
Korg			Taika Waititi^{V}
Scott Lang Ant-Man	Paul Rudd		Paul Rudd^{V}
Loki (Note: This is an alternate version of the character from a branched reality created in Avengers: Endgame (2019).)	Tom Hiddleston^{C}	Tom Hiddleston	Tom Hiddleston^{V}
Mobius M. Mobius	Owen Wilson^{C}	Owen Wilson	
Matt Murdock Daredevil		Charlie Cox	Charlie Cox^{V}
Nebula	Karen Gillan		Karen Gillan^{V}
Hank Pym Ant-Man	Michael Douglas		Michael Douglas^{V}
Hunter B-15	Wunmi Mosaku	Wunmi Mosaku	
Peter Quill Star-Lord	Chris Pratt		Mace Montgomery Miskel^{V}
Monica Rambeau	Teyonah Parris		Teyonah Parris^{V}
Rocket Raccoon	Bradley Cooper^{V}		Bradley Cooper^{V}
Thaddeus Ross Red Hulk	Harrison Ford		Travis Willingham^{V}
Alexei Shostakov Red Guardian	David Harbour		David Harbour^{V}
Tony Stark Iron Man			Mick Wingert^{V}
Stephen Strange			Benedict Cumberbatch^{V} Robin Atkin Downes^{V}
Thor	Chris Hemsworth^{A}		Chris Hemsworth^{V}
Valkyrie	Tessa Thompson		Tessa Thompson^{V}
Victor Timely	Jonathan Majors^{C}	Jonathan Majors	
Yondu Udonta	Michael Rooker^{C}		Michael Rooker^{V}
Hope van Dyne Wasp	Evangeline Lilly		Madeleine McGraw^{V}
John Walker U.S. Agent	Wyatt Russell		Wyatt Russell^{V}
The Watcher			Jeffrey Wright^{V}
Riri Williams Ironheart		Dominique Thorne	Dominique Thorne^{V}
Sam Wilson Captain America	Anthony Mackie		Anthony Mackie^{V}

== Music ==
Score albums for Phase Five films
Title	U.S. release date	Length	Composer(s)	Labels	Ref.
Ant-Man and the Wasp: Quantumania (Original Motion Picture Soundtrack)	February 15, 2023	60:14	Christophe Beck	Hollywood Records; Marvel Music	
Guardians of the Galaxy Vol. 3 (Original Score)	May 3, 2023	63:02	John Murphy	Hollywood Records; Marvel Music	
The Marvels (Original Motion Picture Soundtrack)	November 8, 2023	68:29	Laura Karpman	Hollywood Records; Marvel Music	
Deadpool & Wolverine (Original Score)	July 24, 2024	61:51	Rob Simonsen	Hollywood Records; Marvel Music	
Captain America: Brave New World (Original Motion Picture Soundtrack)	February 12, 2025	72:07	Laura Karpman	Hollywood Records; Marvel Music	
Thunderbolts* (Original Motion Picture Soundtrack)	April 30, 2025	48:31	Son Lux	Hollywood Records; Marvel Music	

Compilation albums for Phase Five films
Title	U.S. release date	Length	Label(s)	Ref.
Guardians of the Galaxy Vol. 3: Awesome Mix Vol. 3 (Original Motion Picture Soundtrack)	May 3, 2023	65:13	Hollywood Records; Marvel Music	
Deadpool & Wolverine (Original Motion Picture Soundtrack)	July 24, 2024	61:52	Hollywood Records; Marvel Music	
Deadpool & Wolverine: Madonna's "Like a Prayer" EP	August 9, 2024	11:00	Warner Records	

Deadpool & Wolverine includes the single "Slash" by Stray Kids.

Albums for Phase Five series
Series	Title	U.S. release date	Length	Composer(s)	Labels	Ref.
Secret Invasion	Vol. 1 (Episodes 1–3) (Original Soundtrack)	July 12, 2023	46:59	Kris Bowers	Hollywood Records; Marvel Music	
Secret Invasion	Vol. 2 (Episodes 4–6) (Original Soundtrack)	August 4, 2023	54:11	Kris Bowers	Hollywood Records; Marvel Music	
Loki season 2	Vol. 1 (Episodes 1–3) (Original Soundtrack)	October 27, 2023	52:07	Natalie Holt	Hollywood Records; Marvel Music	
Loki season 2	Vol. 2 (Episodes 4–6) (Original Soundtrack)	November 17, 2023	69:34	Natalie Holt	Hollywood Records; Marvel Music	
What If...? season 2	Episode 3 (Original Soundtrack)	December 15, 2023	4:51	Laura Karpman and Nora Kroll-Rosenbaum	Hollywood Records; Marvel Music	
What If...? season 2	Original Soundtrack	January 5, 2024	32:00	Laura Karpman and Nora Kroll-Rosenbaum	Hollywood Records; Marvel Music	
Echo	Original Soundtrack	January 12, 2024	77:00	Dave Porter	Hollywood Records; Marvel Music	
Agatha All Along	Songs from Episodes 1 & 2	September 18, 2024	4:59	Kristen Anderson-Lopez and Robert Lopez	Hollywood Records; Marvel Music	
Agatha All Along	Songs from Episode 4	October 2, 2024	9:19	Kristen Anderson-Lopez and Robert Lopez	Hollywood Records; Marvel Music	
Agatha All Along	Vol. 1 (Episodes 1–5) (Original Soundtrack)	October 11, 2024	75:11	Christophe Beck, Michael Paraskevas, Kristen Anderson-Lopez, and Robert Lopez	Hollywood Records; Marvel Music	
Agatha All Along	Songs from Episode 9	October 31, 2024	3:23	Kristen Anderson-Lopez and Robert Lopez	Hollywood Records; Marvel Music	
Agatha All Along	Vol. 2 (Episodes 6–9) (Original Soundtrack)	November 1, 2024	76:45	Christophe Beck, Michael Paraskevas, Kristen Anderson-Lopez, and Robert Lopez	Hollywood Records; Marvel Music	
What If...? season 3	Original Soundtrack	January 10, 2025	58:00	Laura Karpman and Nora Kroll-Rosenbaum	Hollywood Records; Marvel Music	
Your Friendly Neighborhood Spider-Man season 1	Original Soundtrack	February 21, 2025	63:00	Leo Birenberg and Zach Robinson	Hollywood Records; Marvel Music	
Daredevil: Born Again season 1	Episodes 1–4 (Original Soundtrack)	March 28, 2025	33:42	The Newton Brothers	Hollywood Records; Marvel Music	
Daredevil: Born Again season 1	Episodes 5–9 (Original Soundtrack)	April 18, 2025	44:14	The Newton Brothers	Hollywood Records; Marvel Music	
Ironheart	Vol. 1 (Episodes 1–3) (Original Soundtrack)	June 24, 2025	49:23	Dara Taylor	Hollywood Records; Marvel Music	
Ironheart	Vol. 2 (Episodes 4–6) (Original Soundtrack)	July 1, 2025	77:25	Dara Taylor	Hollywood Records; Marvel Music	

== Home media ==
Home media releases of Phase Five films
Film	Digital release	DVD/Blu-ray release
Ant-Man and the Wasp: Quantumania	April 18, 2023	May 16, 2023
Guardians of the Galaxy Vol. 3	July 7, 2023	August 1, 2023
The Marvels	January 16, 2024	February 13, 2024
Deadpool & Wolverine	October 1, 2024	October 22, 2024
Captain America: Brave New World	April 15, 2025	May 13, 2025
Thunderbolts*	July 1, 2025	July 29, 2025

Home media releases of Phase Five television series
Television series	Blu-ray/Ultra-HD Blu-ray release
Loki season 2	December 3, 2024

== Reception ==
=== Box office performance ===
Box office performance of Phase Five films
Film	U.S. release date	Box office gross			All-time ranking		Budget	Ref.
Film	U.S. release date	U.S. and Canada	Other territories	Worldwide	U.S. and Canada	Worldwide	Budget	Ref.
Ant-Man and the Wasp: Quantumania	February 17, 2023	$214,504,909	$261,566,271	$476,071,180	223	286	$388.4 million	
Guardians of the Galaxy Vol. 3	May 5, 2023	$358,995,815	$486,559,962	$845,555,777	70	99	$250 million	
The Marvels	November 10, 2023	$84,500,223	$121,636,602	$206,136,825	1031	922	$375 million	
Deadpool & Wolverine	July 26, 2024	$636,745,858	$701,327,787	$1,338,073,645	12	21	$429 million	
Captain America: Brave New World	February 14, 2025	$200,500,001	$214,601,576	$415,101,577	254	358	$180 million	
Thunderbolts*	May 2, 2025	$190,274,328	$192,162,589	$382,436,917	275	411	$180 million	
Total		$1,685,521,134	$1,977,854,787	$3,663,375,921	–	–	$1.573 billion	

=== Critical and public response ===
Critical and public response of Phase Five films
Film	Critical		Public	
Film	Rotten Tomatoes	Metacritic	CinemaScore	PostTrak
Ant-Man and the Wasp: Quantumania	46% (414 reviews)	48 (61 reviews)	B	75%
Guardians of the Galaxy Vol. 3	82% (409 reviews)	64 (63 reviews)	A	91%
The Marvels	63% (377 reviews)	50 (57 reviews)	B	73%
Deadpool & Wolverine	77% (421 reviews)	56 (58 reviews)	A	96%
Captain America: Brave New World	46% (368 reviews)	42 (56 reviews)	B–	—N/a
Thunderbolts*	88% (382 reviews)	68 (53 reviews)	A–	—N/a

Critical response of Phase Five television series
Title	Season	Rotten Tomatoes	Metacritic
Secret Invasion	–	53% (204 reviews)	63 (24 reviews)
Loki	2	82% (178 reviews)	65 (23 reviews)
What If...?	2	88% (32 reviews)	79 (7 reviews)
What If...?	3	80% (30 reviews)	—N/a
Echo	–	71% (89 reviews)	62 (24 reviews)
Agatha All Along	–	84% (218 reviews)	66 (32 reviews)
Your Friendly Neighborhood Spider-Man	1	97% (38 reviews)	76 (11 reviews)
Daredevil: Born Again	1	87% (224 reviews)	69 (33 reviews)
Ironheart	–	76% (131 reviews)	57 (25 reviews)

At the conclusion of this phase, Kai Young at ComicBook.com called it one of the MCU's most polarizing, with a mixture of well-received projects along with "some lackluster and low-rated installments", though he noted the later installments had a noticeable shift in quality following Marvel Studios's development overhaul as a result of the 2023 Hollywood strikes.

== Tie-in media ==
=== Marvel Studios: Legends season 2 (2023–2025) ===
The first season of Marvel Studios: Legends premiered in January 2021 for Phase Four. The series examines individual heroes, villains, moments, and objects from the Marvel Cinematic Universe and how they connect, in anticipation of the upcoming stories that will feature them in Phase Five. The second season premiered on Disney+ on February 10, 2023, with the release of the first three episodes. Episodes highlighted Ant-Man, Hank Pym and Janet van Dyne, the Wasp, Peter Quill, Gamora, Nebula, Rocket, Kraglin, Groot, Nick Fury, Maria Hill, Talos and the Skrulls, Everett Ross, James Rhodes, the TVA, Variants, Carol Danvers, Monica Rambeau, and Kamala Khan, the Guardians of the Multiverse; and Riri Williams.

=== Marvel Studios: Assembled (2023–2024) ===
Marvel Studios: Assembled premiered in March 2021 for Phase Four. Each special of the documentary series goes behind the scenes of the making of the MCU films and television series with cast members and additional creatives. The first special for Phase Five was released on Disney+ on July 19, 2023, for Ant-Man and the Wasp: Quantumania, followed by additional specials for Guardians of the Galaxy Vol. 3, Secret Invasion, Loki season two, Echo, The Marvels, Deadpool & Wolverine, and Agatha All Along.

=== Comic books ===
Tie-in comics of Phase Five
Title	No. of issues	Publication date		Writer(s)	Artist(s)
Title	No. of issues	First published	Last published	Writer(s)	Artist(s)
Your Friendly Neighborhood Spider-Man	5	December 11, 2024	April 23, 2025	Christos Gage	Eric Gapstur

== Related ==
- X-Men '97 season 1: A continuation of X-Men: The Animated Series (1992–1997), produced by Marvel Studios via its Marvel Animation label. Beau DeMayo served as head writer, with Jake Castorena as supervising director and Chase Conley and Emi Yonemura also directing. Many cast members from the original series returned to reprise their roles or voice new characters. X-Men '97 is not set in the Sacred Timeline of the MCU, though Feige did consider integrating the series with the MCU during development. Instead, X-Men '97 shares continuity with the original series and several other animated Marvel series that were released in the 1990s; within Marvel Comics' multiverse, X-Men: The Animated Series exists on Earth-92131. Despite existing outside the Sacred Timeline, the series is listed in the MCU's Multiverse Saga section on Disney+. The season aired from March 20 to May 15, 2024.
