= Ironheart (miniseries) =

2025 Marvel Studios television miniseries

- Genre: Action-adventure; Crime drama; Science fiction; Superhero
- Created by: Chinaka Hodge
- Based on: Marvel Comics
- Starring: Dominique Thorne; Lyric Ross; Manny Montana; Matthew Elam; Anji White; Jim Rash; Eric André; Cree Summer; Sonia Denis; Shea Couleé; Zoe Terakes; Shakira Barrera; Anthony Ramos; Alden Ehrenreich; Regan Aliyah; Paul Calderón; Sacha Baron Cohen
- Music by: Dara Taylor
- Country of origin: United States
- Original language: English
- No. of episodes: 6

Production
- Executive producers: Kevin Feige; Louis D'Esposito; Brad Winderbaum; Zoie Nagelhout; Chinaka Hodge; Ryan Coogler; Sev Ohanian; Zinzi Coogler; Robert Kulzer
- Producer: Ethan Smith
- Production locations: Atlanta, Georgia; Chicago
- Cinematography: Ante Cheng; Alison Kelly
- Editors: Rosanne Tan; Deanna Nowell; Cedric Nairn-Smith; Shannon Baker Davis; Chris McCaleb
- Running time: 42–60 minutes
- Production companies: Marvel Television; Proximity Media

Original release
- Network: Disney+
- Release: June 24 – July 1, 2025

Related
- Black Panther: Wakanda Forever; Marvel Cinematic Universe television series

Ironheart is an American television miniseries created by Chinaka Hodge for the streaming service Disney+, based on Marvel Comics featuring the character of the same name. It is the 14th television series in the Marvel Cinematic Universe (MCU) from Marvel Studios and was produced under its Marvel Television label. Sharing continuity with the films of the MCU, the series begins after the events of the film Black Panther: Wakanda Forever (2022) and follows MIT student Riri Williams as she returns home to Chicago where she discovers secrets that pit technology against magic. Hodge served as head writer for the series, which was also produced by Proximity Media.

Dominique Thorne reprises her role as Riri Williams / Ironheart from Wakanda Forever, starring alongside Lyric Ross, Manny Montana, Matthew Elam, Anji White, Jim Rash, Eric André, Cree Summer, Sonia Denis, Shea Couleé, Zoe Terakes, Shakira Barrera, Anthony Ramos, Alden Ehrenreich, Regan Aliyah, Paul Calderón, and Sacha Baron Cohen. The series was announced in December 2020, along with Thorne's casting. Hodge was hired in April 2021, with additional castings revealed in February 2022. Sam Bailey and Angela Barnes joined to direct in April 2022. Filming began at Trilith Studios in Atlanta, Georgia, by early June, before moving to Chicago in late October, and concluded by early November.

Ironheart premiered on Disney+ with its first three episodes on June 24, 2025, followed by its other three episodes on July 1. It is the conclusion of Phase Five of the MCU. The series received generally positive reviews from critics, but became subject to a review bombing campaign ahead of its release.

== Premise ==
Following the events of the film Black Panther: Wakanda Forever (2022), MIT student Riri Williams returns home to Chicago where she becomes entangled with the enigmatic Parker Robbins / The Hood, discovering secrets that pit technology against magic and setting her on a path of danger and adventure.

== Cast and characters ==
- Dominique Thorne as Riri Williams / Ironheart:
  An MIT student and genius inventor from Chicago who created a suit of armor like the one built by Tony Stark / Iron Man. Thorne explained that Ironheart would give a "deeper dive" into Riri after the character was previewed in the Marvel Cinematic Universe (MCU) film Black Panther: Wakanda Forever (2022), saying the series helps explain her background and upbringing that made her the person seen in Wakanda Forever, as well as dealing with the events of that film and how they change her outlook on being Ironheart. She read Ironheart comic books by Brian Michael Bendis and Eve Ewing to help understand the character's relationship with her father. Executive producer Sev Ohanian said Riri would be going down a "break[ing] bad" path, similar to the antiheroes Walter White from the Breaking Bad franchise and Tony Soprano from the television series The Sopranos (1999–2007). Alyse Elna Lewis portrays a young Riri.
- Lyric Ross as Natalie Washington and N.A.T.A.L.I.E.:
  Natalie is Riri's deceased best friend that she turns into her in-suit artificial intelligence (AI) N.A.T.A.L.I.E., short for Neuro Autonomous Technical Assistant and Laboratory Intelligence Entity. Kent Churchill portrays a young Natalie.
- Manny Montana as John: Parker Robbins's cousin and a knife-wielding member of his gang
- Matthew Elam as Xavier Washington: Riri's neighbor and friend, and Natalie's brother
- Anji White as Ronnie Williams: Riri's mother
- Jim Rash as Professor Wilkes: A teacher at MIT
- Eric André as Stuart Clarke / Rampage: A tech specialist and member of Parker's gang
- Cree Summer as Madeline Stanton: Ronnie's flamboyant friend, Zelma's mother, and a former Kamar-Taj trainee who runs a joint candy and magic shop
- Sonia Denis as Clown: A pyrotechnics specialist and member of Parker's gang
- Shea Couleé as Slug:
  A hacker from Madripoor and member of Parker's gang. Slug is a former drag queen who wants to redistribute wealth from the privileged to the Chicago community, and uses non-binary pronouns.
- Zoe Terakes as Jeri Blood: The muscle of Parker's gang and former athlete-turned-street fighter who is Roz's brother
- Shakira Barrera as Roz Blood:
  The muscle of Parker's gang and former athlete-turned-street fighter who is Jeri's sister. Barrera previously played Agent King in the seventh season of the Marvel Television series Agents of S.H.I.E.L.D. (2020).
- Anthony Ramos as Parker Robbins / The Hood:
  A gang leader and former ally-turned-enemy of Riri's who dons a cloak that allows him to tap into dark arts and magic. Ramos said Parker was complex and a misfit who "wants to take in other misfits and show the world that you looked at us as outcasts but we're going to end up on top". Parker is from the Chicago neighborhood Humboldt Park, being raised by his mother, who is part of the Puerto Rican street gang-turned activist organization, the Young Lords; in the comics, Parker is from New York City. Executive producer Ryan Coogler said Parker and Riri are two sides of the same coin, and the two bond over their shared quest for greatness.
- Alden Ehrenreich as Ezekiel "Zeke" Stane:
  A tech ethicist and black market arms dealer who is the son of Stark's late mentor-turned-nemesis Obadiah Stane and changed his identity to "Joe McGillicuddy".
- Regan Aliyah as Zelma Stanton: Riri's friend and Madeline's daughter who practices the mystic arts
- Paul Calderón as Arthur Robbins: The CEO of Artworks and Parker's father
- Sacha Baron Cohen as Mephisto:
  A powerful extra-dimensional demon who originally gave Parker his cloak. According to executive producer Zoie Nagelhout, Mephisto allowed for an "interesting and heightened way to tie together the characters' journeys" in the series, particularly Riri's. Cohen worked with trainer Alfonso Moretti to achieve a more "buff" physique quickly for the role. The rapid change in Cohen's body because of his training required a few alterations to his Mephisto costume to still be able to fit him.

Recurring in the series are Harper Anthony as Landon, a neighborhood boy who charges Riri for odd jobs; LaRoyce Hawkins as Gary Williams, Riri's late stepfather; Tanya Christiansen as Heather, Zeke's neighbor; and Zhaleh as Sheila Zarate, the CEO of TNNL. Rapper Saba appears as himself.

== Episodes ==
No.	Title	Directed by	Written by	Original release date
1	"Take Me Home"	Sam Bailey	Chinaka Hodge	June 24, 2025
Riri Williams is expelled from MIT for selling her work to other students to plagiarize. She takes her new suit of armor home to Chicago, still grieving the deaths of her best friend Natalie Washington and stepfather Gary from a drive-by shooting. Riri reconnects with Natalie's brother Xavier, and is recruited by John into "The Hood," a gang of thieves led by his cousin Parker Robbins, who possesses a mysterious cloak. Riri narrowly escapes a gas-filled elevator as her first test. Needing money to improve her suit, she agrees to join them for three heists. At home, Riri lashes out at her mother Ronnie over the loss of their loved ones, and maps out her own brain to create a built-in AI for her suit, but her unprocessed grief results in a digital recreation of Natalie. She contemplates her decision of continuing to keep Natalie in her suit as she battles her emotions.
2	"Will the Real Natalie Please Stand Up?"	Sam Bailey	Malarie Howard	June 24, 2025
Struggling to come to terms with the AI N.A.T.A.L.I.E., Riri meets Parker's gang — hacker Slug, fighters Jeri and Roz Blood, pyrotechnician Clown, and knife-wielding John. They target TNNL, a company converting Chicago's freight tunnels into a private highway at the expense of local communities. Riri blackmails Joe McGillicuddy, a black market arms collector in Evanston, for parts to complete her suit, while N.A.T.A.L.I.E. is discovered by Ronnie. The heist is nearly derailed when N.A.T.A.L.I.E. reconnects to Riri's suit, but they successfully sabotage TNNL, allowing Parker to extort the CEO into placing the gang on the company's payroll. N.A.T.A.L.I.E. freezes when held at gunpoint by a guard and Parker intervenes, bending the path of his own bullet. N.A.T.A.L.I.E. warns Riri to be wary of Parker's powers, who develops black veins spreading across his body.
3	"We in Danger, Girl"	Sam Bailey	Francesca Gailes & Jacqueline J. Gailes	June 24, 2025
John reprimands Riri and Clown for touching Parker's cloak, the source of his powers, and the gang targets Heirlum, an agritech company whose innovations are harming small farmers. Stuart "Rampage" Clarke, who Riri replaced in Parker's gang, is murdered, leading her to seek help from Joe, who is revealed to be Zeke Stane, son of Obadiah Stane. Zeke warns Riri against repeating Obadiah's mistakes and gives her a sample of biomesh skin to fool Heirlum's security system. During the heist, as Parker attempts to extort CEO Hunter Mason, Riri cuts off a piece of the cloak to analyze but triggers the security system, trapping the gang as the facility fills with carbon dioxide. Parker kills Mason and escapes with the others, while Riri is caught and attacked by John, who admits to killing Stuart on Parker's orders. Losing Zeke's biomesh, Riri is rescued by N.A.T.A.L.I.E., leaving John to suffocate. A distraught Parker nearly renounces the cloak, but receives a vision implicating Riri for John's death.
4	"Bad Magic"	Angela Barnes	Amir Sulaiman	July 1, 2025
In a flashback, Parker and John rob a mansion. When Parker gets caught by a security guard, John shoots the security guard as they flee in different directions. Lying to the gang, Riri fears retribution from Parker, while the biomesh is traced to Zeke, who is arrested and turns against her. Riri's paranoia leads Ronnie to seek help from her friend Madeline Stanton, a former Kamar-Taj trainee, and Madeline's daughter Zelma. Examining the fragment of the cloak, the Stantons determine it is a dangerous artifact from a dark dimension that may be influencing Parker, and Ronnie shares her frustrations about Riri never opening up to her. Unable to find a way to destroy the cloak, Riri has a panic attack and N.A.T.A.L.I.E. summons Xavier, who is horrified by N.A.T.A.L.I.E. emulating his late sister and demands Riri delete the AI. Hurt, N.A.T.A.L.I.E. departs with the suit while the gang breaks Zeke out of jail and assists him in implanting himself with bionic enhancements. Revealing that Riri is responsible for John's death, Parker sends the gang to kill her.
5	"Karma's a Glitch"	Angela Barnes	Cristian Martinez	July 1, 2025
Slug captures N.A.T.A.L.I.E. and the suit while Riri meets with Zelma, who believes the cloak came from Dormammu, at White Castle. Ambushed by the Blood Siblings and Clown, Riri fights them off and tells Clown that John killed Stuart. N.A.T.A.L.I.E. breaks free but is still angry with Riri, who is attacked by a bionically-enhanced Zeke. He dismantles Riri's suit, but spares her life. Riri turns to her mother for help. Zeke and Clown lie that Riri is dead as the gang turns on Parker for having Stuart killed. He fires them all. Parker takes control of Zeke's upgraded body to break into the home of Parker's wealthy father Arthur Robbins, who has a controlling interest in the companies he targeted, and forces him to sign over everything at gunpoint. Reconciling with Ronnie, N.A.T.A.L.I.E., and Xavier, Riri builds a new suit in Gary's garage using the car they were restoring with help from Zelma and Landon. Zelma powers the suit with magic, but N.A.T.A.L.I.E. is deleted in the process.
6	"The Past Is the Past"	Angela Barnes	Chinaka Hodge	July 1, 2025
In a flashback following the attempted robbery of his father's mansion, Parker is approached by Mephisto, who offers to help him achieve his desires. Accepting the deal, Parker is given Mephisto's hooded cloak. In the present, Parker accuses Mephisto of not fulfilling their bargain and Mephisto offers more power if Parker can retain the cloak. Unable to recreate N.A.T.A.L.I.E., Riri ignores her family and friends' advice and goes to Parker's hideout, fighting a reluctant Zeke before freeing him from Parker's control. Fully corrupted by the hood, Parker battles Riri and appears to gain the upper hand, but Riri dupes him with a hologram and removes the cloak, leaving him powerless. Downstairs, Mephisto reveals his identity to Riri, and offers her a deal, which she accepts on the condition that her loved ones are left alone. Later, Natalie appears restored to life and Riri hugs her, as Mephisto's veins spread across Riri's arm. In a mid-credits scene, Parker visits the Stantons' store and asks Zelma for help in obtaining some big magic.

== Production ==
=== Development ===
A film based on the Marvel Comics character Riri Williams / Ironheart had a script written by Jada Rodriguez by July 2018, when it was listed on the Black List. In December 2020, Marvel Studios president Kevin Feige announced the Disney+ television series Ironheart. In April 2021, Chinaka Hodge was hired to serve as head writer of the series. In March 2022, series actor Anthony Ramos revealed that Ryan Coogler, the director of the Marvel Cinematic Universe (MCU) film Black Panther (2018) and its sequel Black Panther: Wakanda Forever (2022), was involved in the production; star Dominique Thorne first appears as Riri Williams / Ironheart in Wakanda Forever, and Coogler's production company Proximity Media was set to work alongside Marvel Studios on select Disney+ series as part of a television deal with the Walt Disney Company. In April, Coogler's Proximity Media was confirmed to be producing the series, when Sam Bailey and Angela Barnes joined to each direct three episodes of the series. Ironheart consists of six episodes, and was released under Marvel Studios' "Marvel Television" label. Executive producers on the series include Marvel Studios' Feige, Louis D'Esposito, Brad Winderbaum, and Zoie Nagelhout; Proximity Media's Ryan Coogler, Zinzi Coogler, and Sev Ohanian; and Hodge. Eve Ewing, a writer for Ironheart in the comics, was a consulting producer.

Because Ironheart was developed prior to Marvel Studios' late 2023 shift towards multi-season television series, they were taking a "wait-and-see approach" by May 2025 regarding if it would get a second season.

=== Writing ===
Malarie Howard, Francesca Gailes, Jacqueline J. Gailes, Amir Sulaiman, and Cristian Martinez were writers on the series alongside Hodge, with the Gailes both previously writing for the Marvel Studios series She-Hulk: Attorney at Law (2022). Ironheart's writers' room for the series was set to begin in May 2021. Feige felt the conflict between Riri's technology and the magic of Parker Robbins / The Hood made the series unique within the MCU. Coogler said Ironheart would take the realism of the MCU's street-level television series such as Daredevil (2015–2018) and combine it with the mystical side of the franchise, as Ironheart features characters that Coogler felt "would be at home" in projects such as the film Doctor Strange (2016) and the miniseries WandaVision (2021).

Marvel Studios executive Nate Moore described Ironheart as a direct sequel to Wakanda Forever, with the events of the series taking place six months after that film. The series explores the repercussions of Riri's experiences in Wakanda Forever when she returns to her home; this includes her being expelled from MIT for skipping classes and using too many of the university's resources, which causes her to engage in illegal activities—such as joining Parker and his gang—to fund her projects. Setting the series in Riri's hometown of Chicago, which Ramos called a character in its own right that is part of the identity of all the characters, gives her and the other characters choices for trying to get ahead, be it with power, money, or something else. Ramos said this affects each of the characters positively and negatively, and eventually their choices start to interweave. The writers tried to make complicated characters who were neither entirely good or evil, with star Alden Ehrenreich believing the writers presented "a psychological, emotional portrait" of each character.

The series introduces Mephisto, an extra-dimensional demon who had been teased to appear in the MCU since WandaVision, as the entity behind Parker's cloak powers. Hodge said his inclusion was "not my decision alone" but was "empowered" by the Marvel team to feature him in Ironheart, and called the introduction "a really powerful tool". Coogler enjoyed the fact that Mephisto first appears in this series, instead of one like WandaVision, Loki (2021–2023), or Agatha All Along (2024), where audiences would least expect him to. The creatives initially considered following the comics and having the cloak's powers come from Dormammu, who was seen in Doctor Strange and who Nagelhout said "would have been very exciting to play with", before realizing that Mephisto represented a better "thematic fit" for the series with regards to "ambition, cost, and what you're willing to give up for the things you want"; Mephisto makes a deal with Riri that brings back her dead best friend Natalie. Hodge explained that this choice sets up Riri "to make big, grown woman decisions in the MCU" while Thorne was "excited" that her character "doesn't have to walk the traditional hero path". Thorne added that Riri's choice was a reinforcement of her mentality towards not being overly committed to being a hero, first seen in Wakanda Forever. Coogler believed it made sense for Riri to make the deal since she has always been wanted and to be seen for her potential, which Mephisto does.

=== Casting ===
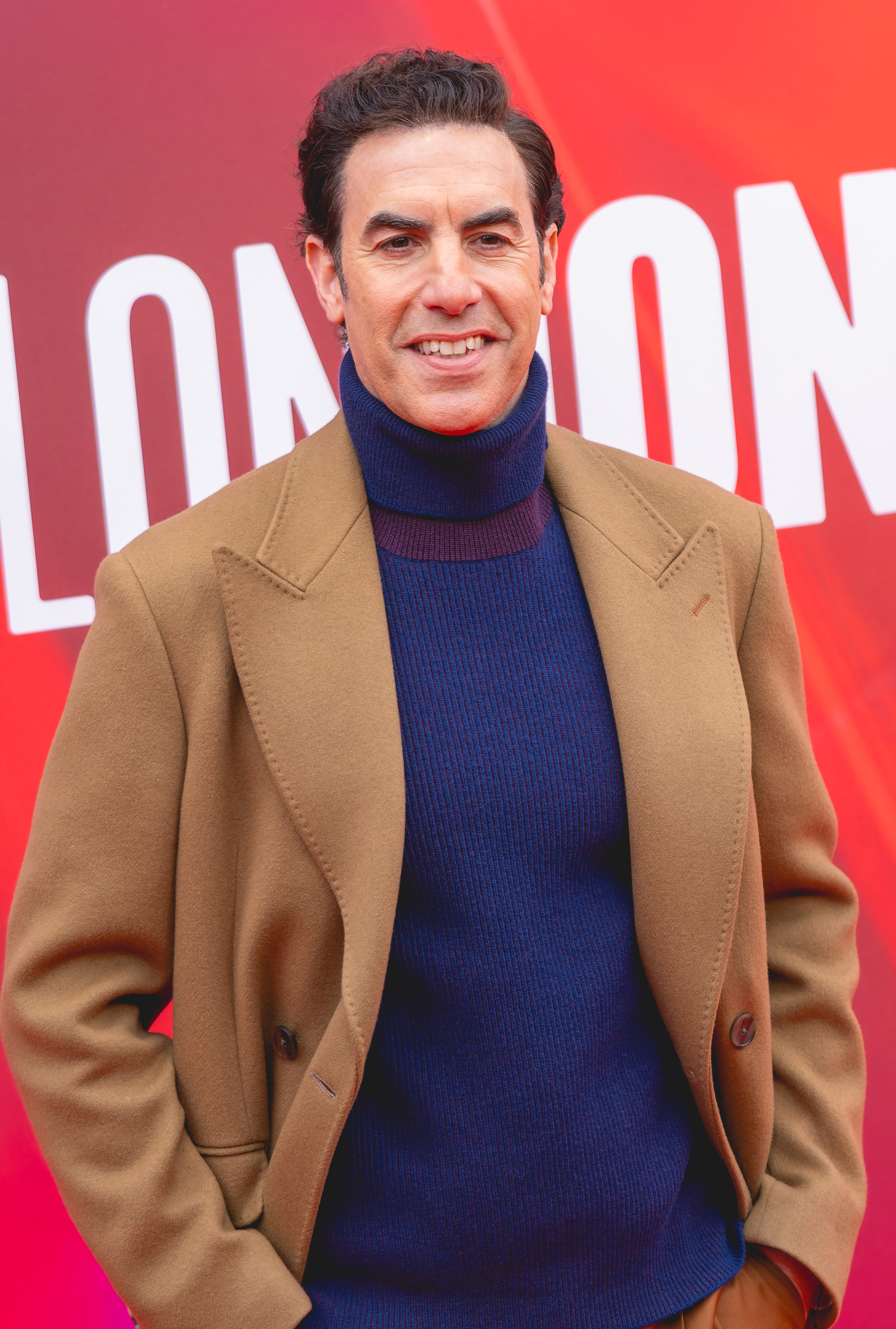
Mephisto, played by Sacha Baron Cohen, is introduced to the MCU with the series, after his inclusion was speculated on since 2021.

Dominique Thorne was revealed to have been cast as Riri Williams / Ironheart with the series' announcement, after Marvel Studios offered her the role without auditioning; Thorne had previously auditioned for Black Panther and was told then by Marvel Studios that they wanted to work with her on a future project once she had more experience. In February 2022, Anthony Ramos joined the series as Parker Robbins / The Hood, described as a key role and the series' main antagonist. Deadline Hollywood reported that his role would expand to other MCU projects, similar to how Jonathan Majors appeared as He Who Remains in the first season of Loki (2021) ahead of his appearance as Kang the Conqueror in the film Ant-Man and the Wasp: Quantumania (2023). Later that month, Lyric Ross was cast as Riri's best friend. Newcomer Harper Anthony joined the cast in an undisclosed role by April, followed by Manny Montana in June. A month later, Alden Ehrenreich joined the cast in another key role.

From August to October 2022, Shea Couleé, Zoe Terakes, Regan Aliyah, Shakira Barrera, Rashida "Sheedz" Olayiwola, Sonia Denis, Paul Calderón, and Cree Summer joined the cast. At the D23 Expo in September, Jim Rash was revealed to be reprising his role as the Dean of MIT from the MCU film Captain America: Civil War (2016). The following month, Deadline Hollywood reported that Sacha Baron Cohen had joined the MCU in a role that would see him potentially first appear in the later episodes of Ironheart followed by appearances in other MCU projects. His role was likely to be Mephisto, which would be portrayed by Baron Cohen in-person as well as through visual effects. Director Angela Barnes suggested Cohen for the part. Cohen said the series' creative team, which was predominantly Black, were "amazingly considerate" when he was offered the role because they were aware of negative associations of Jews and the devil and did not want to be seen as antisemitic. In June 2023, Anji White was revealed as a series regular, believed to be portraying Riri's mother Ronnie. A United States Copyright Office filing for the series in October 2023 revealed several roles: Ehrenreich as Joe McGillicuddy, Ross as Natalie Washington, Matthew Elam as Xavier Washington, White as Ronnie Williams, Montana as John, and Couleé as Slug. It also confirmed that Baron Cohen would appear in Ironheart, playing Mephisto in the series finale, with the character being viewed by Marvel Studios as the next "prominent" villain of the MCU.

In mid-June 2025, Denis was revealed to be playing Clown in the series, alongside Barrera and Terakes as siblings Roz and Jeri Blood, respectively. At that time, Eric André was announced to have been cast as Stuart Clarke / Rampage. He had previously been reported in late 2022 to have been cast for an episode of Agatha All Along. Later that month, several roles were revealed for the series: Harper Anthony as Landon, Aliyah as Zelma Stanton, Summer as Madeline Stanton, and LaRoyce Hawkins as Gary Williams.

=== Design ===
Andrew Menzies was the production designer for the series, while Terrance Harris served as the costume designer.

=== Filming ===
Filming took place in Chicago in late May 2022, to capture plate shots and exterior establishing shots. Principal photography had begun by June 2, at Trilith Studios in Atlanta, Georgia, under the working title Wise Guy, with Bailey and Barnes directing. Alison Kelly and Ante Cheng were the cinematographers. Filming occurred in September on Edgewood Avenue in Sweet Auburn, Atlanta, at a building constructed to stand in for a White Castle restaurant in Chicago. Filming was scheduled to move to Chicago by October 24, 2022, to run through November 3, in South Side, Near North Side, and downtown Chicago. Primary filming wrapped by early November 2022, with two days of additional photography taking place at a later date. A full, practical Ironheart suit was created for filming to help as a lighting and visual effects reference, similar to techniques used on the first MCU film Iron Man (2008).

=== Post-production ===
Winderbaum said the series was being edited by March 2024. Cedric Nairn-Smith, Shannon Baker Davis, Deanna Nowell, Rosanne Tan, and Chris McCaleb served as editors on the series. Greg Steele served as the visual effects supervisor, with Base FX, Cantina Creative, Frame by Frame, ILM, Luma Pictures, Rise FX, SDFX Studios, and Tippett Studio providing the visual effects.

=== Music ===
Dara Taylor composed the score for the series. Her theme for the series was released as a digital single by Hollywood Records and Marvel Music on June 19, 2025. The first volume of the soundtrack, featuring music from the first three episodes, was released on June 24. A second volume soundtrack for the final three episodes was released on July 1.

Ironheart: Vol. 1 (Episodes 1–3) [Original Soundtrack]
No.	Title	Length
1.	"Ironheart (Riri's Theme)"	2:17
2.	"The Crew"	2:05
3.	"Cloaked in Darkness"	0:43
4.	"Think Fast"	1:46
5.	"Black Market"	1:05
6.	"New Friend"	1:31
7.	"The Suburbs"	0:57
8.	"To the Bunker"	1:40
9.	"First Heist"	2:28
10.	"Sign Here"	1:26
11.	"Live Laugh Love"	1:23
12.	"Crime Family"	1:26
13.	"Hacking"	0:57
14.	"Cover Up"	1:39
15.	"Scans and Scales"	1:18
16.	"New Suit"	2:21
17.	"A Job for You"	1:04
18.	"Revenge"	1:00
19.	"Secrets"	1:21
20.	"Blackmail"	1:04
21.	"New Plan"	2:02
22.	"Your Own Person"	3:46
23.	"Next Target"	1:48
24.	"Breaking In"	1:46
25.	"What He Did to Me"	1:34
26.	"Old Friends"	3:36
27.	"Botany"	5:34
28.	"Betrayal"	3:23
29.	"Shadows and Truths"	1:03
Total length:		49:23

Ironheart: Vol. 2 (Episodes 4–6) [Original Soundtrack]
No.	Title	Length
1.	"Villains (Parker's Theme)"	1:57
2.	"The Uninvited"	2:30
3.	"Castle of Chaos"	2:26
4.	"Stop Running"	1:26
5.	"An Iron Freak"	4:15
6.	"Something You Won't Even Miss"	2:33
7.	"Arrested"	1:32
8.	"Art of Fatherhood"	3:34
9.	"Ice Bath"	1:07
10.	"Patsy"	1:16
11.	"Bad Magic"	2:11
12.	"A Whole New Life"	2:08
13.	"Prison Break"	1:34
14.	"A Good Person"	4:13
15.	"I Want Her Head"	0:51
16.	"Upgrade"	1:42
17.	"To Eat It"	2:03
18.	"You Don't Have to Fight Alone"	1:40
19.	"The Truth"	3:14
20.	"Rock'em Sock'em"	2:50
21.	"Liability"	3:48
22.	"The Price of Magic"	2:24
23.	"A Rock and a Pizza Place"	1:44
24.	"Playing House"	2:50
25.	"Trial and Error"	2:30
26.	"Tête-à-Tête"	4:49
27.	"One of the Good Ones"	4:12
28.	"What Do You Say?"	3:20
29.	"Make My Millennium"	2:06
Total length:		1:17:25

== Marketing ==
Footage from the series was shown at Disney's D23 convention in September 2022. Thorne and Ramos then promoted the series at Disney's May 2024 upfront presentation, where the release year was announced. The pair again promoted the series that August, at another D23 convention, with Coogler, Ross, Ramos, Ehrenreich, and Aliyah. Footage from the series was shown, which Jacob Hall of /Film described as "a crime show with an Iron Man twist at the center". Following online leaks of the D23 footage, Marvel released an official look at Riri in her Ironheart armor within their video celebrating the company's 85th anniversary. More footage from the series was included in a video released by Disney+ in October, announcing the release schedule for Marvel Television and Marvel Animation projects through the end of 2025.

Footage was included in a sizzle reel that was shown at Disney's upfront presentation on May 13, 2025. A teaser featurette, featuring new footage as well as an interview with Coogler, was released online that day ahead of the first trailer for the series on May 14. Dais Johnston from Inverse said there had been a "surprising lack of marketing" for the series, considering how close it was to being released. Germain Lussier at Gizmodo also said it was nice to see "marketing ramp up" for the series. He praised the featurette for establishing character, stakes, and story with a lot of new footage. Discussing the full trailer, Empire's Jordan King said it quickly established the tone of the series, making it clear that it was telling its own story about Riri rather than trying to be "Iron Man 2.0". King compared the death-trap sequence that opens the trailer to the Saw franchise.

A Marvel Studios: Legends episode focusing on Riri was released on YouTube on June 13, 2025. Later that month, Thorne and Ramos were surprised during a Good Morning America interview with a video message from Robert Downey Jr.—who played Tony Stark / Iron Man in the MCU before being cast as Victor von Doom / Doctor Doom in the franchise—expressing support for the series. A poster was also released featuring the episode titles. Marco Vito Oddo at ComicBook.com noted that the "M" in the title "Karma's a Glitch" is "distinctly red-tinged", in contrast with the other black letters, and speculated that this was a reference to Cohen's rumored role as Mephisto.

== Release ==
Ironheart premiered on Disney+ with its first three episodes on June 24, 2025, followed by its other three episodes on July 1. Writing for Inverse, Johnston expressed disappointment with the series' batched release schedule considering the small episode count, feeling Disney may be "looking to dump the whole series as soon as possible" and hoping it was "just a quirk of the Disney+ release schedule". Ironheart was originally scheduled to debut in late 2023, but by February of that year it was considered unlikely to premiere in 2023 as Disney and Marvel Studios were re-evaluating their content output. That May, it was reported to be releasing in 2024, but was removed from Marvel Studios' release schedule in September 2023, with the 2023 Hollywood labor disputes affecting their ability to complete the series. The next month, the series' copyright filing indicated an approximate release on September 3, 2024. The June 2025 release date was announced a year later. It is the final series in Phase Five of the MCU.

== Reception ==
=== Viewership ===
Market research company Parrot Analytics, which examines consumer engagement across streaming, downloads, and social media, reported that Ironheart registered 17.6 times the average audience demand in the United States in June 2025, ranking in the 99th percentile for the drama genre. Demand for the series grew by 224.6 percent during that month, placing it ninth overall in the U.S. Parrot Analytics noted significant interest in international markets such as Canada and the United Kingdom. Streaming analytics firm FlixPatrol, which monitors daily updated VOD charts and streaming ratings across the globe, revealed that Ironheart was the most-streamed show on Disney+ following its debut on the platform. Two weeks after its release, the series continued to hold the No. 1 spot in Disney+'s top ten ranking. Whip Media, which tracks viewership data from over 25 million global users of its TV Time app, reported that Ironheart ranked as the third most-streamed original series in the U.S. for the week ending June 29 through July 6, before moving to tenth place for the week ending July 13. Nielsen Media Research, which records streaming viewership on U.S. television screens, estimated that Ironheart was watched for 526 million minutes, ranking as the sixth most-streamed original series from June 23–29. The following week, from June 30 to July 6, it recorded 536 million minutes of viewing time, ranking seventh among original series.

=== Critical response ===
Ironheart: Critical reception by episode
Percentage of positive critics' reviews tracked by the website Rotten Tomatoes

The review aggregator website Rotten Tomatoes reports a 76% approval rating based on 131 reviews. The website's critics consensus reads, "Dominique Thorne ignites the MCU skies with charisma and confidence to boot, making Ironheart a worthy watch despite its conventional genre armor." Metacritic, which uses a weighted average, assigned a score of 57 out of 100 based on 25 critics, indicating "mixed or average".

Ben Travers of IndieWire gave the series a B and said, "Even though Ironheart isn't fully equipped to wrestle with the ethical arguments it introduces, the show's accessible approach still makes room for generalized lessons to sink in." Lucy Mangan of The Guardian gave a rating of 3 out of 5 and described it as "a fast and furious business. Like Ms. Marvel, it is clearly aimed at the younger end of the fan spectrum and the pace is relentless, as if the makers are desperate not to give the audience a second to look away."

Before the release of the first three episodes, the series was review bombed on Rotten Tomatoes and IMDb with a high number of negative audience reviews, which Casey Loving at TheWrap noted had become common for MCU projects featuring women, people of color, or LGBTQ+ individuals as leads.

=== Accolades ===
Accolades received by Ironheart
Award	Date of ceremony	Category	Recipient	Result	Ref.
NAACP Image Awards	February 28, 2026	Outstanding Limited Television (Series, Special, or Movie)	Ironheart	Nominated	
NAACP Image Awards	February 28, 2026	Outstanding Actress in a Limited Television (Series, Special, or Movie)	Dominique Thorne	Nominated	
NAACP Image Awards	February 28, 2026	Outstanding Supporting Actress in a Limited Television (Series, Special, or Movie)	Lyric Ross	Nominated	
NAACP Image Awards	February 28, 2026	Outstanding Breakthrough Creative (Television)	Chinaka Hodge	Won	
NAACP Image Awards	February 28, 2026	Outstanding Directing in a Drama Series	Angela Barnes (for "The Past Is the Past")	Nominated	
NAACP Image Awards	February 28, 2026	Outstanding Original Score for TV/Film	Marvel's Ironheart: Vol. 1 (Original Soundtrack)	Nominated	
NAACP Image Awards	February 28, 2026	Outstanding Editing in a Motion Picture or Television Series, Movie, or Special	Deanna Nowell, ACE	Won	
Saturn Awards	March 8, 2026	Best Superhero Television Series	Ironheart	Nominated	
