= Lyric Ross =

American actress

- Occupation: Actress
- Known for: Deja Pearson in This Is Us

Lyric Ross is an American actress. She is known for her role as Deja Pearson in the NBC drama series This Is Us and Natalie Washington/N.A.T.A.L.I.E. in Ironheart (2025).

== Early life and career ==
Ross raised in Homewood, Illinois, is the daughter of Brandi Smith and Stephen Ross and granddaughter of Margaret Smith. She started acting when she was five years old, appearing in commercials and guest-starring in Chicago Fire and Sirens. In 2017, she performed in a recurring role as Deja Pearson on season 2 of This Is Us while in the eighth grade at James Hart School in Homewood, Illinois. On August 27, 2018, NBC announced that Ross had been promoted to a series regular onwards season 3. She and the rest of the show's cast won the Screen Actors Guild Award for Outstanding Performance by an Ensemble in a Drama Series in 2018.

She has been cast in 2025 television series Ironheart.

In 2022, she dubbed in the stop motion film Wendell & Wild as Katherine "Kat" Koniqua Elliot.

== Philanthropy ==
Ross serves as a celebrity ambassador for Orphan Myth.

== Filmography ==
=== Film ===
Year	Title	Role	Notes
2017	Rogers Park	Ruby	
2018	Canal Street	Tameka	
2022	The Class	Casey	
2022	Wendell & Wild	Kat Elliot (voice)	

=== Television ===
Year	Title	Role	Notes
2015	Sirens	Lily	1 episode
2015	Chicago Fire	Girl	1 episode
2016	Untitled Lena Waithe Project	Andrea	TV movie
2017–2022	This Is Us	Deja Pearson	Recurring (season 2); main character (season 3–6)
2025	Ironheart	Natalie Washington/N.A.T.A.L.I.E.	Miniseries

== Awards and nominations ==
Year	Award	Category	Project	Result
2018	Teen Choice Awards	Choice TV Breakout Star	This Is Us	Nominated
2019	BET Awards	Young Stars Award	This Is Us	Nominated
2019	Screen Actors Guild Awards	Outstanding Performance by an Ensemble in a Drama Series	This Is Us	Won
2019	Image Awards (NAACP)	Outstanding Performance by a Youth (Series, Special, Television Movie or Limited Series)	This Is Us	Nominated
2020	Image Awards (NAACP)	Outstanding Performance by a Youth (Series, Special, Television Movie or Limited Series)	This Is Us	Nominated
2020	Image Awards (NAACP)	Outstanding Supporting Actress in a Drama Series	This Is Us	Nominated
2021	Image Awards (NAACP)	Outstanding Performance by a Youth (Series, Special, Television Movie or Limited Series)	This Is Us	Nominated
2023	Image Awards (NAACP)	Outstanding Character Voice-Over Performance, Motion Picture	Wendell & Wild	Nominated
2026	Image Awards (NAACP)	Outstanding Supporting Actress in a Limited Television (Series, Special, or Movie)	Ironheart	Nominated
