= Dominique Thorne =

American actress

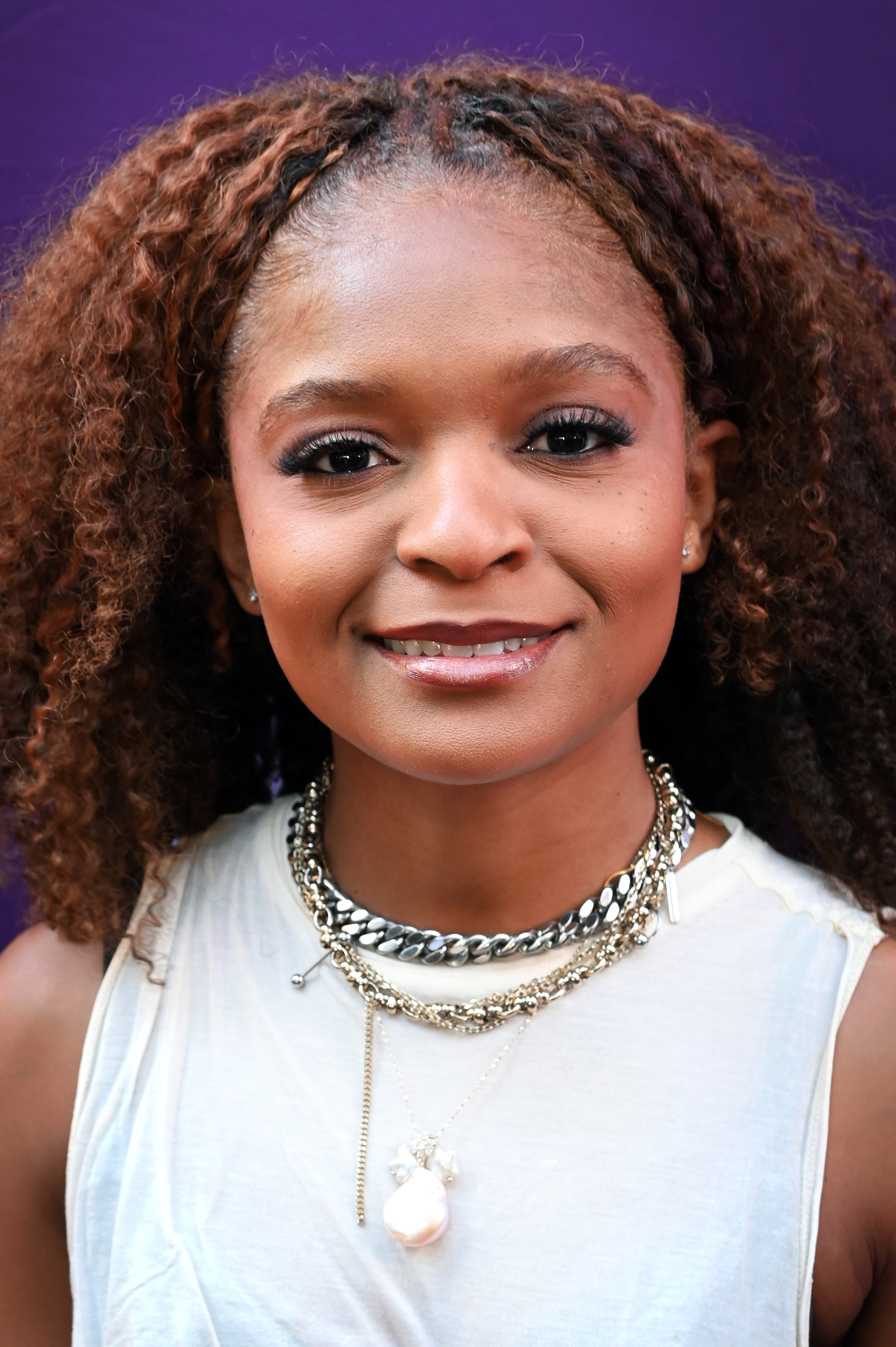
- Thorne in 2026
- Born: November 5, 1997 (age 29); New York City, New York, U.S.
- Education: Cornell University (BS)
- Occupation: Actress
- Years active: 2018–present

Dominique Thorne (born November 5, 1997) is an American actress. She began her career with appearances in the films If Beale Street Could Talk (2018) and Judas and the Black Messiah (2021). In 2022, she began playing Riri Williams / Ironheart with the Marvel Cinematic Universe feature film Black Panther: Wakanda Forever, a role she reprised in the 2025 Disney+ miniseries Ironheart. In 2024, she starred in the Anna Boden and Ryan Fleck film Freaky Tales.

== Early life ==
Thorne was born November 5, 1997, to Trinidadian and Guyanese immigrants Nerissa and Gavin Thorne in Brooklyn, New York. She has two younger brothers. Her family later moved to Newark, Delaware.

Thorne attended the Professional Performing Arts School in Manhattan (PPAS) where she studied dramatic theatre formally. During her senior year of high school, she won the 2015 Young Arts Award in Spoken Theater as well as the U.S. Presidential Scholar in the Arts, which is given annually by the White House. After applying to a number of universities for both academics and art programs, Thorne chose to attend Cornell University, where she was initiated into Mu Gamma chapter of Delta Sigma Theta sorority in Spring 2018. The following year, she received her bachelors degree in Human Development with a minor in Inequality Studies. Prior to graduating in May 2019, she became a member of the Sphinx Head secret senior honors society. As of 2020, she and her family live in Atlanta.

== Career ==
In 2018, Thorne made her feature film debut as Shelia Hunt, the ill-tempered younger sister of main character Fonny Hunt, in the film If Beale Street Could Talk, which was based on James Baldwin's novel of the same name. In 2021, she played Judy Harmon, a member of the Black Panthers, in the film Judas and the Black Messiah.

In 2016, she auditioned with Marvel Studios for the role of Shuri in the 2018 Marvel Cinematic Universe film Black Panther. Her audition involved screen tests with Chadwick Boseman. The role eventually went to Letitia Wright.

In 2020, she was cast as Riri Williams / Ironheart in the Disney+ television series Ironheart. Because of her earlier tests with Marvel Studios, she was cast in this role without any additional auditions. She made her debut as Riri in the 2022 feature film Black Panther: Wakanda Forever. Producer Nate Moore said that when Marvel Studios was casting Riri Williams, Dominique was their "first and only call."

== Filmography ==
=== Film ===
Year	Title	Role
2018	If Beale Street Could Talk	Shelia Hunt
2021	Judas and the Black Messiah	Judy Harmon
2022	Black Panther: Wakanda Forever	Riri Williams / Ironheart
2024	Freaky Tales	Barbie

=== Television ===
Year	Title	Role	Notes
2024	What If...?	Riri Williams / Ironheart	Voice; Episode: "What If... the Emergence Destroyed the Earth?"
2025	Ironheart	Riri Williams / Ironheart	Main role; 6 episodes
2025	Marvel Zombies	Riri Williams / Ironheart	Voice; 2 episodes

=== Stage ===
Year	Title	Role	Venue	Notes
2023	Jaja's African Hair Braiding	Marie	Samuel J. Friedman Theatre	Broadway Debut

== Accolades ==
Year	Award	Category	Project	Result	Ref.
2023	Black Reel Awards	Outstanding Breakthrough Performance, Female	Black Panther: Wakanda Forever	Nominated	
2026	NAACP Image Awards	Outstanding Actress in a Limited Television (Series, Special, or Movie)	Ironheart	Nominated	
