= Ironheart (character) =

Comic book superhero

- Riri Williams on the cover of Ironheart #1 (2020). Art by S Skan.

Publication information
- Publisher: Marvel Comics
- First appearance: Cameo appearance: Invincible Iron Man (vol. 2) #7 (May 2016); Full appearance: Invincible Iron Man (vol. 2) #9 (July 2016); As Ironheart: Invincible Iron Man (vol. 3) #3 (January 2017)
- Created by: Brian Michael Bendis; Mike Deodato; Eve Ewing; Kevin Libranda

In-story information
- Alter ego: Riri Williams
- Species: Human
- Team affiliations: Young Avengers; Stark Industries; Champions; Avengers
- Notable aliases: Queen of Latveria; Lady Ironheart; Iron Man
- Abilities: Skilled inventor and engineer; Super genius level intellect; Powered armor suit granting: Superhuman strength, speed, durability, agility, reflexes, and senses; Energy repulsor and missile projection; Regenerative life support; Supersonic flight

Altered in-story information for adaptations to other media
- Partnerships: Shuri / Black Panther

Ironheart (Riri Williams) is a superhero appearing in American comic books published by Marvel Comics. Created by writer Brian Michael Bendis and artist Mike Deodato, the character first appeared in Invincible Iron Man (vol. 3) #7 (May 2016).

Dominique Thorne portrays the character in the Marvel Cinematic Universe (MCU) film Black Panther: Wakanda Forever (2022) and Disney+ series Ironheart (2025).

== Publication history ==
Riri Williams debuted in Invincible Iron Man (vol. 2) #7 (May 2016), created by writer Brian Michael Bendis and artist Mike Deodato. Williams is a teenaged MIT engineering student who reverse engineered one of Iron Man's armored suits to wear herself. She was inspired by American actress Skai Jackson. She later appeared under the codename Ironheart in the 2017 volume of the Invincible Iron Man series, by Bendis and Stefano Caselli. She appeared in the 2018 Infinity Countdown: Champions series, by Jim Zub and Emilio Laiso. Williams then appeared in the 2018 Ironheart series, her first solo comic book series, by Eve Ewing and Kevin Libranda. She later appeared in the 2019 Champions series, by Jim Zub and Steven Cummings. She then again appeared in the 2020 Ironheart series, her second solo comic book series, by Vita Ayala, Danny Lore, and David Messina.

=== Controversy ===
In October 2016, Marvel Comics and New York-based retailer Midtown Comics jointly decided to pull from circulation J. Scott Campbell's variant cover of the first issue of The Invincible Iron Man, produced exclusively for that store, after previews of the cover were criticized for sexualizing the depicted character, 15-year-old Riri Williams. The cover depicted the character in a midriff-baring crop top, in contrast to the more modest way in which artist Stefano Caselli depicted the character in the book's interior art. Campbell called the decision "unfortunate," explained that his rendition of the character was intended to depict "a sassy, coming-of-age young woman". He regarded the reaction to the cover as a "faux controversy", saying, "I gave her a sassy 'attitude'...'sexualizing' was not intended. This reaction is odd." Brian Michael Bendis, the writer on the series, was pleased with the decision to pull the cover, saying that while he liked the face Campbell had drawn on Riri when he viewed the art as a work in progress, he disliked the completed art, saying, "Specialty covers are not in my purview and it was being produced separately from the work of the people involved in making the comic. Not to pass the buck but that’s the fact. If I had seen a sketch or something I would have voiced similar concerns. I am certain the next version will be amazing."

== Fictional character biography ==
=== Origins ===
Riri Williams is a 15-year-old engineering student and the daughter of Riri Williams Sr. Following her father's death, Riri lives with her mother Ronnie, her stepfather Gary, and her paternal Aunt Sharon in Chicago. A certified super-genius, she attends the Massachusetts Institute of Technology on a scholarship. Riri later befriended Natalie Washington, who showed an interest in her work. During a picnic at Marquette Park, Gary and Natalie are killed in a drive-by shooting. Working alone, Riri designs a suit of armor similar to the Iron Man Armor using material stolen from campus. When campus security knocks at her door, she flees while wearing the suit.

When Williams prevents two inmates from escaping the New Mexico State Penitentiary, her suit is damaged. Upon returning to her mother's house, Riri continues to work on improving the suit, much to the dismay of her aunt. Tony Stark hears of Riri's accomplishment and goes to meet her. During their meeting, Stark decides that he will endorse her decision to become a superhero.

=== Post-"Civil War II" ===
Appearing in her Rescue armor following the 2016 "Civil War II" storyline, Pepper Potts confronts Riri Williams and Tony Stark, who has transferred his consciousness into a device becoming an A.I., in an attempt to explain the problems of being a superhero. They are then attacked by Techno Golem and her Biohack Ninjas. As Riri flees and Pepper fights them, Techno Golem tries to find out how Pepper knows Riri. When Techno Golem's armor breaks and Tomoe tries to instead attack Riri, Pepper uses her Rescue armored gauntlets and knocks Tomoe out. When Sharon Carter formally meets Riri after the arrest of Tomoe and the Biohack Ninjas, Pepper tells Riri that they will talk again. Pepper Potts, Mary Jane Watson, Friday, the Tony Stark A.I., and Stark's biological mother Amanda Armstrong are in the Hall of Armor with Riri when she demonstrates her knowledge of each of the Iron Man armors. When Amanda Armstrong offers to allow Riri to use Tony Stark's labs as her base of operations, Riri is hesitant but Pepper encourages her. The next day at her home, Riri's family is visited by the head of M.I.T. She wants Riri to continue working there, as it has gotten sloppy since she left. Riri would also be allowed to use the laboratories at the school. After working in one of the labs, Riri asks the Tony Stark A.I. to find her something to blow off some steam. The Tony Stark A.I. locates Armadillo during a crime spree and Riri uses the Ironheart armor to defeat Armadillo. She is then approached by the Champions, who offer her membership into their group.

=== "Secret Empire" ===
During the 2017 "Secret Empire" storyline, Ironheart is seen fighting the Army of Evil during Hydra's takeover of the United States. Baron Helmut Zemo has Blackout surround Manhattan with Darkforce after enhancing him with the powers of the Darkhold. Riri sends a distress signal to all available heroes to meet her in Washington, D.C. Ironheart and Falcon join up with the Champions to assist in the underground's fight against Hydra's takeover of the country. They later follow Black Widow when she makes her own plans for Captain America. During training, the young heroes disagree about Black Widow's brutality and mercilessness. The heroes later infiltrate a Hydra base to find someone crucial to Black Widow's plan. Black Widow later tells them that they are going to have to kill Steve Rogers, after Hydra destroys the Underground hideout. In Washington, D.C., as their assault begins, Spider-Man fights Captain America, but Black Widow intervenes and is killed. Just as Spider-Man is about to kill Steve Rogers, the others convince him to not do it and they all get arrested. She also helped the Champions search for survivors in Las Vegas, Nevada, after its destruction by Hydra.

=== Champions ===
In a 2019 storyline, Riri is startled to learn that her android teammate Viv Vision has developed a crush on her, which she immediately rejects due to her surprise and social awkwardness. Later, her mind – and that of several other Champions – is corrupted by Mephisto's son Blackheart, turning her against her teammates. However, when Riri is about to destroy Viv, it is the latter's honest apology for not considering her feelings which snaps her out of Blackheart's control and finally makes her acknowledge Viv's affection.

During the 2020 "Outlawed" storyline, Ironheart is among the teenage superheroes affected by the Underage Superhuman Warfare Act that was drafted by Senator Geoffrey Patrick ever since Ms. Marvel was put in a coma during a fight with an Asgardian dragon. The established group C.R.A.D.L.E. raided her lab.

=== "Iron Man 2020" ===
In the "Iron Man 2020" story arc, Riri and N.A.T.A.L.I.E. (an A.I. based on Natalie Washington) confront the Intellicars, who have gone haywire. As Riri interfaces with the Intellicar, N.A.T.A.L.I.E. finds that its A.I. is corrupted with a bad code. As the Intellicar starts acting up again, Riri finds a reset code. N.A.T.A.L.I.E. informs Riri that the signal came from the cell phone of André Sims, an intern at Stark Unlimited's Chicago branch. Sims denies all knowledge of the incident and states that Stark Unlimited is doing the people a favor.

== Reception ==
=== Critical response ===
Rosie Knight of Polygon named Riri Williams one of Marvel's "newest and most popular heroes." Liam McGuire of Screen Rant called Riri Williams "immensely popular," stating, "Tony helped Riri on her path to becoming a full-fledged hero, but Williams created the opportunity for herself and ran with it. She's a self-made hero who just so happened to be one of the smartest people on Earth - just like Tony before her. It's what makes Ironheart such a beloved hero." Alisha Grauso of Looper referred to Riri Williams as the "true heir to Iron Man's legacy," writing, "Fans were excited by the news, the prospect of seeing Ironheart in live action setting them abuzz. Though Ironheart hasn't been around very long in the comics — her first appearance was in "Invincible Iron Man" Vol. 2 #7 — she's quickly become a fan favorite."

English actor Tom Holland – who plays Spider-Man in the Marvel Cinematic Universe – asserted, "She’d be a cool person to bring to the big screen … the multiverse opens up so many doors where we can introduce so many cool new characters like Ironheart." Eric True of Comic Book Resources called Riri Williams a "fan-favorite character," stating, "Riri Williams, otherwise known as Ironheart, has become one of Marvel's most noteworthy new characters of the last decade. She's a kid genius with all the confidence and charisma of a character who loves their time in the spotlight."

Samantha Coley of Collider referred to Riri Williams as a "beloved comic book character." George Marston of Newsarama included Riri Williams in their "Top Marvel Comics Character Debuts" list, writing, "As Tony's replacement, Ironheart, Riri cut her own path through his legacy, taking on some of his biggest villains even as she was forging her own legacy alongside the teen heroes of the Champions. Riri has kept up her superheroic career even though Tony has since returned, embodying her own identity of Ironheart." Rachel Leishman of The Mary Sue called Riri Williams a "fan favorite," while Michele Kirichanskaya ranked her 8th in their "8 Young, New Heroes the Marvel Cinematic Universe Should Focus on Next" list, saying, "Ironheart shows major significance as a potential onscreen hero. As a young woman of color in STEM, Riri Williams shows the potential to inspire thousands of people, especially young girls of color, who look like her that not only can they become heroes, but to enter the STEM field, which have been lacking in diversity."

Screen Rant included Riri Williams in their "10 Most Powerful Members Of The Champions" list, and in their "MCU: 10 Most Desired Fan Favorite Debuts Expected In The Multiverse Saga" list. Comic Book Resources ranked Ironheart 4th in their "Marvel: 10 Smartest Female Characters" list, 6th in their "10 Most Powerful Teen Heroes In Marvel Comics" list, and 10th in their "10 Smartest Heroes In The Marvel Universe" list.

=== Impact ===
In 2017, Riri Williams / Ironheart starred in a short live-action film titled “Not all heroes wear capes — but some carry tubes,” portrayed by Ayomide Fatunde. Produced by the admissions department Massachusetts Institute of Technology (MIT), the film shows Riri Williams walking around campus, attending class, building an Ironheart suit in her dormitory, and taking it on a test flight.

== Literary reception ==
=== Volumes ===
==== Ironheart - 2018 ====
According to Diamond Comic Distributors, Ironheart #1 was the 45th best selling comic book in November 2018.

Matt Lune of Comic Book Resources called Ironheart #1 "new and refreshing," writing, "This may not be Ironheart’s origin, but it is her first (proper) debut as a solo character. As such, Ewing and the team call upon the lessons of past superhero debuts to craft a tale that perfectly walks the line between classically Marvel and refreshingly new. The art is vibrant and engaging, and the script is a genuine breath of fresh air that injects a new life into Riri Williams that will hopefully see this character and her adventures continue on for many years to come. Brian Bendis did a wonderful job creating this character, but Eve L. Ewing makes Ironheart her own." Jenna Anderson of ComicBook.com gave Ironheart #1 a grade of 5 out of 5, saying, "This is a genuinely stunning debut issue. Just from this first installment, it's clear that Ewing is a perfect choice to bring Riri's first solo series to life, with her injecting so much life into each line of dialogue. Whether Riri is rescuing a room full of people or connecting with an old friend, you can't help but thoroughly enjoy each scene. Libranda and Becchio's art also helps elevate things as well, creating something that feels so fresh and stunning, especially when paired with Matt Milla's color work. This book is absolutely a must-buy."

== Other versions ==
An alternate universe version of Riri Williams appears in the Ultimate Marvel universe as a member of the Ultimates.

== In other media ==
=== Television ===
- Riri Williams / Ironheart appears in the Marvel Rising specials, voiced by Sofia Wylie. She first appears in Marvel Rising: Heart of Iron. In flashbacks, she coped with the loss of her stepfather while working on her version of the prototype Iron Man armor, which strained her friendship with a girl named Natalie. In the present, Riri creates an artificial intelligence named A.M.I., which is stolen by Hala the Accuser to be used for a doomsday device. She works with the Secret Warriors to disarm it at the cost of A.M.I.'s arc reactor, subsequently joining the group with a new armor. The character reappears in Marvel Rising: Battle of the Bands.
- Riri Williams / Ironheart appears in Marvel's Spider-Man, voiced again by Sofia Wylie. This version is an Avengers intern who is aided by an artificial intelligence based on Tony Stark that she calls "Not Tony".
- Riri Williams / Ironheart appears in Marvel Super Hero Adventures, voiced by Odessa Rojen.
- Riri Williams / Ironheart appears in Iron Man and His Awesome Friends, voiced by Kapri Ladd.

=== Marvel Cinematic Universe ===
Riri Williams / Ironheart appears in media set in the Marvel Cinematic Universe (MCU), portrayed by Dominique Thorne. Introduced in the film Black Panther: Wakanda Forever (2022), she returns in the Disney+ miniseries Ironheart (2025). Additionally, an alternate version of the character appears in the episode "What If... the Emergence Destroyed the Earth?" of the animated series What If...?, while a separate version appears in the animated television series Marvel Zombies (2025).

=== Video games ===
- Riri Williams / Ironheart appears as a playable character in Marvel Puzzle Quest.
- Riri Williams / Ironheart appears as a playable character in Marvel: Future Fight.
- Riri Williams / Ironheart appears in Marvel Avengers Academy, voiced by Dani Chambers.
- Riri Williams / Ironheart appears as a playable character in Lego Marvel Super Heroes 2 as part of the Champions DLC.
- Riri Williams / Ironheart appears as a playable character in Marvel Strike Force.
- Riri Williams / Ironheart appears in Marvel Snap.

=== Merchandise ===
- In 2018, Funko released a Riri Williams / Ironheart Funko Pop figurine.
- In 2020, Funko released a Riri Williams / Ironheart Funko pop figurine inspired by the Spider-Man incarnation of the character.
- In 2022, Hasbro released a Riri Williams / Ironheart action figure inspired by the MCU incarnation of the character as part of the Marvel Legends action figure line.

== Collected editions ==
Title	Material collected	Publication date	ISBN
Invincible Iron Man: Ironheart Vol. 1 - Riri Williams	Invincible Iron Man (vol. 4) #1-5	February 2018	978-1302906726
Invincible Iron Man: Ironheart Vol. 2 - Choices	Invincible Iron Man (vol. 4) #6-11	June 2018	978-1302906740
Ironheart: Riri Williams	Invincible Iron Man (vol. 4) #1-11	October 2019	978-1302919795
Ironheart Vol. 1: Those With Courage	Ironheart #1-6	July 2019	978-1302915087
Ironheart Vol. 2: Ten Rings	Ironheart #7-12	January 2020	978-1302915094
Ironheart: Meant To Fly	Ironheart #1-12	October 2020	978-1302923525
Iron Man 2020: Robot Revolution - iWOLVERINE	2020 Ironheart #1-2, and 2020 Rescue #1-2, 2020 iWOLVERINE #1-2	November 2020	978-1302925543
