= The Tomb (Moon Knight) =

- Moon Knight episode
- Promotional poster
- Episode no.: Episode 4
- Directed by: Justin Benson; Aaron Moorhead
- Written by: Alex Meenehan; Peter Cameron; Sabir Pirzada
- Cinematography by: Andrew Droz Palermo
- Editing by: Ahmed Hafez
- Original release date: April 20, 2022
- Running time: 53 minutes

Cast
- Lucy Thackeray as Donna; Shaun Scott as Crawley; Loic Mabanza as Bek; Joseph Millson as Dr. Grant; Bill Bekele as Rosser

Episode chronology
← Previous "The Friendly Type"	Next → "Asylum"

"The Tomb" is the fourth episode of the American television miniseries Moon Knight, based on Marvel Comics featuring the character Moon Knight. It follows Marc Spector and Layla El-Faouly as they continue to search for Ammit's tomb before Arthur Harrow can gain access to it. The episode is set in the Marvel Cinematic Universe (MCU), sharing continuity with the films of the franchise. It was written by Alex Meenehan and Peter Cameron & Sabir Pirzada and directed by Justin Benson & Aaron Moorhead.

Oscar Isaac stars as Marc Spector and Steven Grant, alongside May Calamawy as Layla El-Faouly and Ethan Hawke as Arthur Harrow. Khalid Abdalla, Ann Akinjirin, David Ganly, and Antonia Salib also star. Benson and Moorhead joined the series in January 2021 to direct two episodes of the series. Filming took place at Origo Studios in Budapest, with location filming occurring in Jordan.

"The Tomb" was released on Disney+ on April 20, 2022. Critics praised the twist ending and the performances of Isaac and Calamawy.

== Plot ==
Steven Grant and Layla El-Faouly find a deserted camp site at the location of Ammit's tomb, which is a maze in the shape of the Eye of Horus. They discover that some of Arthur Harrow's men have been killed by undead Egyptian priests which then attack them. Layla defeats the priests but encounters Harrow, who claims that her husband Marc Spector was one of the mercenaries who murdered her archaeologist father, Abdallah El-Faouly. Grant and Spector find the tomb and discover that Ammit's last avatar was Alexander the Great. Grant then retrieves Ammit's ushabti from inside Alexander's body.

Layla angrily confronts Spector who reveals that his partner killed Layla's father and shot Spector. Harrow arrives and shoots Spector, who wakes up in a psychiatric hospital populated by people from his life. After escaping from Harrow, who appears to be a therapist at the hospital, Spector finds Grant trapped in a sarcophagus. They also see a second sarcophagus with someone else trapped inside, before they are greeted by a hippopotamus-headed figure.

== Production ==
=== Development ===
In August 2019, Marvel Studios announced a series based on Moon Knight was being developed for the streaming service Disney+. In January 2021, director duo Justin Benson and Aaron Moorhead joined the series to direct two episodes, including the fourth episode. They worked alongside lead director Mohamed Diab to ensure a consistent approach to the series. Executive producers include Marvel Studios' Kevin Feige, Louis D'Esposito, Victoria Alonso, Brad Winderbaum, and Grant Curtis, star Oscar Isaac, Diab, and head writer Jeremy Slater. The fourth episode, titled "The Tomb", was written by Alex Meenehan and Peter Cameron & Sabir Pirzada.

=== Writing ===
For the mental hospital scene, Isaac called it "a total mind melt" when it presents the possibility that everything prior in the series "is not what you thought it was". Benson and Moorhead wanted to do the "least expected thing and completely disorient the audience", but also wanted to stay true to the character from the first four episodes, as well as paying homage to the run in the comics by Jeff Lemire and Greg Smallwood that served as the main inspiration for the series. Speaking to when Marc Spector finds Steven Grant and they embrace, Moorhead noted much of the series had been the antagonism between them, and this was meant to show the two were "starting to learn to work together and gain some mutual respect". Benson and Moorhead requested more material for the in-universe Tomb Buster film than was originally written, so they could have it play in the background if needed.

=== Casting ===
The episode stars Oscar Isaac as Marc Spector and Steven Grant, May Calamawy as Layla El-Faouly, Khalid Abdalla as Selim, Ann Akinjirin as Bobbi Kennedy, David Ganly as Billy Fitzgerald, Antonia Salib as Taweret, and Ethan Hawke as Arthur Harrow. Also appearing are Lucy Thackeray as Donna, Shaun Scott as Crawley, Loic Mabanza as Bek, Joseph Millson as Dr. Grant, and Bill Bekele as Rosser.

=== Design ===
External videos
- Marvel Studios' Moon Knight: End Credits Main On End Title Sequence – Episode 4 presents the episode's main-on-end title sequence, YouTube video from Perception's channel

When designing the tomb for Alexander the Great, production designer Stefania Cella researched his overall life, noting how his tomb was never found, and how he wanted to be considered a pharaoh, despite being Macedonian. As such, she chose to "combine the two cultures", in order to "give an homage to who he wanted to be portrayed in the future generation", when designing his tomb. She based the center altar around ancient Greek and Macedonian architecture, while the walls contained Egyptian hieroglyphs.

For the asylum scene, costume designer Meghan Kasperlik wanted the character to not be wearing the exact same costumes, but having "a little Easter egg from the previous iteration of the character that we have seen". This included adding subtle Easter eggs, such as including a scarlet scarab on El-Faouly's bandaid in the scene. In designing Spector and Grant's outfits for the scene, she wanted Grant's pajamas from "The Goldfish Problem" to be kept, to "connote that he's fallen into this space", while Spector's outfit contained colors similar to his Moon Knight costume, in order to "emphasize the continuity of the universe that he's living in".

The series' main-on-end title sequence was designed by Perception. Each episode's end credits feature a new phase of the moon, starting with a crescent moon in the first episode.

=== Filming and visual effects ===
The mental hospital set (top) was heavily inspired by the Moon Knight comics by Jeff Lemire and Greg Smallwood (bottom).

Filming took place at Origo Studios in Budapest, with Benson and Moorhead directing, and Andrew Droz Palermo serving as cinematographer. Location filming occurred in Wadi Rum, Jordan. Isaac tried to stay "in that drugged mode" when he was filming the end of the episode with Spector waking up in the mental hospital in order to "feel like the audience is just as drugged as Marc is in that moment". The directors wanted to ensure there was a creepy factor to the mental facility scene and that it felt like it was underwater, using slow camera movements and shots meant to replicate Spector's point of view. Heading into filming, Benson and Moorhead felt the conversation between Harrow and Spector in the mental facility would center on Harrow, with a few cuts to Spector. However, after filming Isaac's coverage, they saw "what he was giving us and ... how active it was", including having a real fly land on his hand, and refocused how they planned to edit the sequence to make it more about Spector's experience. The final scene of Spector and Grant meeting Taweret had Salib filming her portion individually, followed by Isaac filming each of Spector and Grant's reactions, with the three takes composited together.

Visual effects for the episode were created by Zoic Studios, Method Studios, Union FX, Crafty Apes, Keep Me Posted, Framestore, Soho VFX, and Mammal Studios.

== Marketing ==
Scanning a QR code from one of the first two episodes allowed viewers to access a free digital copy of Universe X #6. After the episode's release, Marvel announced merchandise inspired by the episode as part of its weekly "Marvel Must Haves" promotion for each episode of the series, including a Moon Knight Funko Pop, apparel, and accessories.

== Release ==
"The Tomb" was released on Disney+ on April 20, 2022. The episode, along with the rest of Moon Knight, was released on Ultra HD Blu-ray and Blu-ray on April 30, 2024.

== Reception ==
=== Viewership ===
According to market research company Parrot Analytics, which looks at consumer engagement in consumer research, streaming, downloads, and on social media, Moon Knight ranked was the second most in-demand breakout show in the U.S. for the week of April 23–29. Breakout shows are defined as the most in-demand series that have premiered within the past 100 days. Moon Knight achieved 34.0 times the average series demand during this period. Nielsen Media Research, which records streaming viewership on U.S. television screens, announced that Moon Knight was the fourth-most watched original series across streaming services for the week of April 18–24 with 630 million minutes watched, which was a 1.25% decrease from the previous week. The streaming aggregator Reelgood, which monitors real-time data from 5 million users in the U.S. for original and acquired streaming programs and movies across subscription video-on-demand (SVOD) and ad-supported video-on-demand (AVOD) services, revealed that it was the most-streamed series in the U.S. for the week ending April 20. Whip Media, which tracks viewership data for the more than 25 million worldwide users of its TV Time app, calculated that Moon Knight was the top streaming original series for the week ending April 24.

=== Critical response ===
The review aggregator website Rotten Tomatoes reports a 94% approval rating with an average rating of 8.60/10, based on 16 reviews. The site's critical consensus reads, "Moon Knight is at its best in "The Tomb," a rollicking adventure that tantalizingly reframes the story going forward."

Maggie Boccella of Collider gave the episode an "A+", saying "the show is officially ramping up in a way that Marvel never has before, opening the door for something new and dangerous that once again threatens the universe as we know it". However, she felt that including Alexander the Great felt like a cheap way to incorporate history into the series for the sake of it due to Alexander being closer to Cleopatra and the Roman Empire. Boccella praised the horror aspects of the episode and felt like the episode reached its greatest potential after Spector's death. In conclusion, she was impressed with the psychedelic aspects of the psychiatric hospital and compared it to something that Legion would do, as it was something new for the MCU to feature. Writing for IGN, Matt Fowler gave the episode a 9 out of 10, saying that structure is everything for TV season and that "The Tomb" was the perfect episode at the perfect time. He praised the psychiatric hospital scenes, crediting the show for not just making it a cliffhanger or a post credit scene. He called the direction the episode took as what was best for the season with only two episodes left. Fowler felt emotions "ran rampant" as a result of the love triangle forming between Layla with Spector and Grant. Fowler thought that the emotional aspect worked out well because of the time and care out into the three characters. In conclusion Fowler said "Moon Knight pulls from the pages of one of our hero's craziest comic arcs to drop a much-needed bomb on the adventure".

The A.V. Club's Manuel Betancourt gave the episode a "B", also praising the twist of Spector's death. He compared the psychiatric hospital scenes to the season six episode of Buffy the Vampire Slayer, "Normal Again", which had a similar premise. Betancourt felt that the middle of the episode moved a little slow with the focus on archeology lore and backstory. However, he felt that the scenes were made better with the Moon Knight suit unavailable because it resulted in "tense conversations and one attack from a very scary being" that forced the character's to be their resourceful selves. Kirsten Howard from Den of Geek gave the episode just a 3 out of 5, feeling that the episode "delivers an unexpected twist that may delight fans of the character's comics but confuse everyone else". They felt that the series had too much story for its own good up to this point. Howard said they found themselves worried with where things were by the end of the episode and thought that some viewers may wonder what the point of the earlier episodes was if it turned out that none of what was shown was real.
