= Asylum (Moon Knight) =

- Moon Knight episode
- Promotional poster
- Episode no.: Episode 5
- Directed by: Mohamed Diab
- Written by: Rebecca Kirsch; Matthew Orton
- Cinematography by: Gregory Middleton
- Editing by: Joan Sobel
- Original release date: April 27, 2022
- Running time: 50 minutes

Cast
- Claudio Fabian Contreras as Randall Spector; Carlos Sanchez as Young Marc Spector and Steven Grant; David Jake Rodriguez as Teenage Marc Spector; Usama Soliman as Abdallah El-Faouly

Episode chronology
← Previous "The Tomb"	Next → "Gods and Monsters"

"Asylum" is the fifth episode of the American television miniseries Moon Knight, based on Marvel Comics featuring the character Moon Knight. It follows Marc Spector and Steven Grant as they try to make sense of their situation in a psychiatric hospital. The episode is set in the Marvel Cinematic Universe (MCU), sharing continuity with the films of the franchise. It was written by Rebecca Kirsch and Matthew Orton and directed by Mohamed Diab.

Oscar Isaac stars as Marc Spector and Steven Grant, alongside May Calamawy, Ann Akinjirin, David Ganly, Fernanda Andrade, Antonia Salib, Karim El-Hakim, Rey Lucas, F. Murray Abraham, and Ethan Hawke. Diab joined the series by October 2020 to direct four episodes. Filming took place at Origo Studios in Budapest.

"Asylum" was released on the streaming service Disney+ on April 27, 2022. Critics highlighted the episode for its plot twists, emotional weight, Isaac's performance, and its portrayal of Spector and Grant's dissociative identity disorder (DID).

== Plot ==
Steven Grant identifies the hippopotamus-headed woman as the Egyptian goddess Taweret, who explains to him and Marc Spector that they are dead and that the "psychiatric hospital" is actually inside a boat sailing through the Duat. She weighs their hearts on the Scales of Justice to determine if they would be allowed to enter the Field of Reeds, and she advises them to help each other uncover hidden memories causing their imbalance. Grant sees a memory of Spector's younger brother Randall drowning and Spector's mother Wendy blaming him for it, while Spector reveals to Grant how he became Khonshu's avatar on a mission with his partner Bushman. Spector and Grant convince Taweret to let them return to the living world to stop Arthur Harrow, who has released Ammit, and she steers the boat towards the Gates of Osiris.

"Dr. Harrow", a psychiatrist version of Harrow, convinces Spector to fully open up to Grant, and Spector reluctantly explains that he unknowingly created Grant as a result of their mother's abuse. Grant and Spector reconcile with each other, but their scales fail to balance, causing hostile spirits to attack them. While fending them off, Grant falls off the boat and is consumed by the Duat. The scales become balanced, and Spector finds himself in the Field of Reeds.

== Production ==
=== Development ===
In August 2019, Marvel Studios announced a series based on Moon Knight was being developed for the streaming service Disney+. By October 2020, Mohamed Diab was set to direct four episodes, including the fifth episode. Diab executive produces alongside Marvel Studios' Kevin Feige, Louis D'Esposito, Victoria Alonso, Brad Winderbaum, and Grant Curtis, star Oscar Isaac, and head writer Jeremy Slater. The fifth episode, titled "Asylum", was written by Kirsch and Orton.

=== Writing ===
During development of the series, Slater kept returning to a poster that featured the various Egyptian deities, and was fascinated with the hippopotamus-looking one, Taweret. Once he determined she would be included in the series in some form, knowing she was the goddess who guided souls through the Duat helped craft the story for the back half of the series and deciding to kill Marc Spector and Steven Grant. The episode shows the origin story for Spector and Grant; it shows how Spector developed dissociative identity disorder (DID), leading to the creation of Grant's persona. Diab said that Spector's biggest fear was the death of his brother. Both Diab and Sarah Goher, a consulting producer on the series and Diab's wife, wanted the episode to depict Spector's internal struggle along with his struggle with Egyptian gods interfering in his life. Goher explained that the creatives wanted to be respectful in how the team depicted grief, as they did not want to depict Spector's mother as a bad person. Diab also explained that the episode was a "major turning point" in the series, as both Spector and Grant begin working together, adding that "Marc and Steven are a fraction of the same person. But you feel like Marc is the older brother and there is that dynamic".

Slater also wrote the episode to revolve around Spector and Grant "reconciling who they were" and their "internal journey over the course of that episode". As such, he felt that there was no need for them to balance Jake Lockley's soul, another identity of Moon Knight, as Grant and Spector were not aware of his presence. He also felt that Grant would be the one to balance their scales at the end because "realizes that he is the protector of the system, and him finally stepping up and doing that job, and sort of assuming the mantle of what he was always supposed to be", while Spector was aware of who he was throughout the episode, and was "repressing it and delaying it" throughout.

=== Casting ===
The episode stars Oscar Isaac as Marc Spector / Moon Knight and Steven Grant / Mr. Knight, May Calamawy as Layla El-Faouly, Ann Akinjirin as Bobbi Kennedy, David Ganly as Billy Fitzgerald, Fernanda Andrade as Wendy Spector, Antonia Salib as Taweret, Karim El-Hakim and F. Murray Abraham as the on-set performer and voice of Khonshu, respectively, Rey Lucas as Elias Spector, and Ethan Hawke as Arthur Harrow. Also appearing are Claudio Fabian Contreras as Randall Spector, Carlos Sanchez as a young Spector and Grant, David Jake Rodriguez as a teenage Spector, and Usama Soliman as Abdallah El-Faouly.

=== Design ===
External videos
- Marvel Studios' Moon Knight: End Credits Main On End Title Sequence – Episode 5 presents the episode's main-on-end title sequence, YouTube video from Perception's channel

The series' main-on-end title sequence was designed by Perception. Each episode's end credits feature a new phase of the moon, starting with a crescent moon in the first episode.

=== Filming and visual effects ===
Filming took place at Origo Studios in Budapest, with Diab directing, and Gregory Middleton serving as cinematographer. Isaac's brother, Michael Benjamin Hernandez, performed as a double alongside Isaac in scenes featuring both Spector and Grant, which helped develop a "very familiar and very brotherly atmosphere that translated to both Marc and Steven on-screen". Middleton used three cameras to capture scenes featuring Spector's past, and wanted to make sure the "shots still work". To shoot the scene where Grant watches Spector try and save his brother in the cave, the production team used an actual cave to capture the exterior shot. For the interior, they built another cave and submerged Isaac in a controlled tank. The creative team decided to show as little as possible, as they felt that it was better that way. Middleton explained that this was done to "create a mood and make it seem appropriately dark. It's a feeling of mystery" while Diab said "It's such a haunting moment. And then you don't see what happens, but you see the aftermath. I love the storytelling in that [moment], the cuts and what you leave and what you see.

Visual effects for the episode were created by Framestore, Method Studios, Zoic Studios, Base FX, Keep Me Posted, Crafty Apes, Mammal Studios, and WetaFX. Middleton used gold, due to its in Egyptian mythology, to light scenes featuring the Gates of Osiris and Khonshu's temple. He also consulted with the pre-visualization team, who created computer-generated animatics for Taweret's characters, and sought to capture Salib's performance as much as he could during filming.

=== Music ===
The song "Más Allá del Sol" by Manuel Bonilla is featured in the episode.

== Marketing ==
Like the first two episodes, a QR code was featured in the episode and when scanned it allowed viewers to access a free digital copy of Moon Knight vol. 1 #1. After the episode's release, Marvel announced merchandise inspired by the episode as part of its weekly "Marvel Must Haves" promotion for each episode of the series, including a Moon Knight statue, apparel, and accessories.

== Release ==
"Asylum" was released on Disney+ on April 27, 2022. The episode, along with the rest of Moon Knight, was released on Ultra HD Blu-ray and Blu-ray on April 30, 2024.

== Reception ==
=== Viewership ===
According to market research company Parrot Analytics, which looks at consumer engagement in consumer research, streaming, downloads, and on social media, Moon Knight was the second most in-demand breakout show in the U.S. for the week of April 30 to May 6. Breakout shows are defined as the most in-demand series that have premiered within the past 100 days. Moon Knight achieved 35.1 times the average series demand, which marked a 3% increase. Nielsen Media Research, which records streaming viewership on U.S. television screens, calculated that Moon Knight was the third-most watched original series across streaming services for the week of April 25-May 1 with 681 million minutes watched, which was an 8.1% increase from the previous week. Whip Media, which tracks viewership data for the more than 21 million worldwide users of its TV Time app, reported that it was the top-streaming original series in the U.S. for the week ending May 1.

=== Critical response ===
The review aggregator website Rotten Tomatoes reports a 95% approval rating with an average rating of 8.40/10, based on 19 reviews. The site's critical consensus reads, "Moon Knight turns inward with a self-contained installment that fills in the hero's backstory while deepening the overall season's emotional stakes."

Den of Geek's Kristen Howard thought that, while the episode did not "fix all the tonal and structural issues" from previous episodes, it offered audiences an "olive branch" in the way of "essential cohesion" that was "practically AWOL". Howard thought that their core problem with Moon Knight was "[being] invest[ed]", saying it was a little hard to embrace half a character as the series was focusing on Grant until this episode; and even third a character, noting "The Friendly Type"'s tease of a third alter in Spector. Howard concluded that the episode felt like "a long, cool glass of water" after four episodes, and gave it 4.5 out of 5 stars. Writing for Collider, Maggie Boccella gave the episode an "A+", feeling it as "a kind of therapy in a way, the kind of necessary healing every great hero must come to terms with in order to be the best version of themselves." She thought that, while the episode lacks the "globetrotting adventure aspects" of the previous four, it is perhaps one of the most important episodes, "bonding Marc [Spector] and Steven [Grant] together" before Grant is consumed by the Duat. Boccella said that the idea of Grant having to "die" for Spector's scales to balance felt like "a betrayal of everything up to this point"; She theorized there might be a much deeper meaning to this, noting Marvel Studios' history of unexpected twists.

Matt Fowler of IGN gave the episode a 9 out of 10, saying there was not much revelatory elements in the episode, since a lot of it was Grant learning things he and the audience had already been told, but he praised Isaac's "ace acting" and that it was "enough to easily carry the trippy, effects-filled" episode. Fowler further explained that the series felt like it needed a full episode without blackouts or an extended flashback, saying Moon Knight basically began in the third act of "a much larger saga" and there was much of Spector's dissociative identity disorder to explore, and his origin and beginnings as Moon Knight. Fowler concluded that the series took "a beautiful detour" with the episode, and cleverly covering a lot of ground and answering much questions of Marc Spector's life until the series. Manuel Betancourt at The A.V. Club called placing Spector and Grant in a psychiatric ward "quite ingenious", noting that given the series' interest in mental health and the ways people develop coping mechanisms to grapple with what we'd rather forget, it was "no surprise to have Moon Knight become a splintered, [Christopher] Nolan–esque psychological drama." What worked best for Betancourt was the way the psych ward conceit mixed in with the weighing of the heart mythology allowed the series to bring its two main thematic concerns together.

=== Accolades ===
Isaac was named TVLine's "Performer of the Week" for the week of April 25, 2022, for his performance in this episode, along with Michael Mando for Better Call Saul. The site commended Isaac on his dual roles in "Asylum", especially with Isaac acting alongside himself for the bulk of the episode as Spector and Grant "ran through gamuts of emotions". As the duo relived the traumatic memory of Randall's death, the site felt that Isaac was able to use his face and voice to convey the urgency as Grant asked Spector "why are you remembering her like that"? as he learned of the abuse given to them by their mom. The site said it was a "gut punch" when Isaac was barely able to get the words out when Grant said "you made me up" as he realized that he was not the original after all. At the 74th Primetime Creative Arts Emmy Awards, Middleton was nominated for Outstanding Cinematography for a Limited or Anthology Series or Movie and Hesham Nazih was nominated for Outstanding Music Composition for a Limited or Anthology Series, Movie or Special (Original Dramatic Score).
