= Gods and Monsters (Moon Knight) =

- Moon Knight episode
- Promotional poster
- Episode no.: Episode 6
- Directed by: Mohamed Diab
- Story by: Danielle Iman; Jeremy Slater
- Teleplay by: Jeremy Slater; Peter Cameron; Sabir Pirzada
- Cinematography by: Gregory Middleton
- Editing by: Cedric Nairn-Smith
- Original release date: May 4, 2022
- Running time: 42 minutes

Cast
- Diana Bermudez as Yatzil; Declan Hannigan as Horus's avatar; Hayley Konadu as Tefnut's avatar; Nagisa Morimoto as Isis's avatar

Episode chronology
← Previous "Asylum"	Next → —

"Gods and Monsters" is the sixth episode and series finale of the American television miniseries Moon Knight, based on Marvel Comics featuring the character Moon Knight. It follows Marc Spector, Steven Grant, and Layla El-Faouly as they help Khonshu defeat Ammit and her avatar Arthur Harrow. The episode is set in the Marvel Cinematic Universe (MCU), sharing continuity with the films of the franchise. Its teleplay was written by head writer Jeremy Slater, Peter Cameron, and Sabir Pirzada, and the story was written by Danielle Iman and Slater. The episode was directed by Mohamed Diab.

Oscar Isaac stars as Marc Spector / Moon Knight, Steven Grant / Mr. Knight, and Jake Lockley, alongside May Calamawy as Layla El-Faouly / Scarlet Scarab, Karim El-Hakim and F. Murray Abraham as Khonshu, Sofia Danu and Saba Mubarak as Ammit, and Ethan Hawke as Arthur Harrow. Khalid Abdalla, Ann Akinjirin, and Antonia Salib also star. Diab joined the series by October 2020 to direct four episodes. Filming took place at Origo Studios in Budapest, with location filming occurring in Jordan.

"Gods and Monsters" was released on Disney+ on May 4, 2022. Critics praised the performances and action sequences, ultimately deeming it a satisfying conclusion.

== Plot ==
Layla El-Faouly receives a message from Taweret telling her to find and release Khonshu so he can revive Marc Spector. Arthur Harrow uses Ammit's power to slaughter the other Egyptian gods' avatars before releasing Ammit, who chooses him to be her new avatar, while El-Faouly finds Khonshu's ushabti and releases him. El-Faouly refuses to become Khonshu's new avatar, so he confronts Ammit alone, who overpowers him. Meanwhile, Spector refuses to stay in the Field of Reeds alone, and chooses to return to the Duat and rescue Steven Grant instead. Spector tells Grant that Grant saved and enabled him to survive his hardships, and their connection frees Grant from the entrapment of the Duat. With Taweret's help, they escape through the Gates of Osiris and awaken back in their body. Khonshu senses their return and bonds with them again, healing their body and restoring their powers. El-Faouly discovers that Ammit can be defeated if several gods' avatars bind her into a mortal body, so she temporarily bonds with Taweret. Harrow, Ammit, and their followers begin judging everyone in Cairo, until Spector, Grant, El-Faouly, and Khonshu arrive to engage them in battle.

Harrow overpowers Spector and Grant, and almost kills them until they both black out and reawaken to find that they have somehow brutally defeated him. Spector and El-Faouly are able to seal Ammit into Harrow's body, imprisoning her again. Khonshu urges Spector to execute Harrow and Ammit, but Spector refuses and orders Khonshu to release him and Grant from their service. Spector and Grant find themselves in the imaginary "psychiatric hospital" again, but reject it and choose to continue their new life together.

In a mid-credits scene, a crippled Harrow is abducted from a psychiatric hospital and executed by Jake Lockley, Spector and Grant's third alter who is still bonded with Khonshu.

== Production ==
=== Development ===
In August 2019, Marvel Studios announced a series based on Moon Knight was being developed for the streaming service Disney+. That November, Jeremy Slater was hired to serve as the head writer of the series, while Mohamed Diab was set to direct four episodes by October 2020, including the sixth episode. Slater and Diab executive produce alongside Marvel Studios' Kevin Feige, Louis D'Esposito, Victoria Alonso, Brad Winderbaum, and Grant Curtis and star Oscar Isaac. The sixth episode, titled "Gods and Monsters", had the teleplay written by Slater, Peter Cameron, and Sabir Pirzada, and the story was written by Danielle Iman and Slater.

=== Writing ===
Diab's wife and producing partner Sarah Goher felt the scene of Layla El-Faouly saving a van and a younger girl in her hero attire would be a "magical moment for lots of people around the world" who would finally see themself represented in a superhero property and "feel like they belong". Actress May Calamawy said it was daunting at first knowing she would become a superhero since she "cannot represent every Arab woman or every Egyptian woman", hoping instead that they could watch and hopefully relate to El-Faouly and "feel seen and excited". Diab noted El-Fouly's ending was kept open, believing this was the beginning of a new journey for her, saying continuing her partnership with Taweret would be "so interesting and they can drive each other crazy. Her learning does she need to be a superhero now or not, because she hates the idea right now, or maybe she needs to learn it's important or not. There's so much room to go there". Additionally, her being known as the Scarlet Scarab was revealed following the episode by Marvel.com, with Diab noting he had not connected her to that character from the comics, explaining, "Sometimes Marvel picks a name and then gives it to the character that is developed." He pointed out that at the moment, she did not receive her powers from the scarab, but ultimately felt what the character represented was more important than her name.

The end of the episode with Marc Spector and Steven Grant waking up in their London flat was not the original ending, with other points in the episode considered to end the episode. Diab enjoyed the open nature by the end of the series regarding if the events of Moon Knight had taken place all within Spector's head, pointing out that there were many clues that clouded what was and was not real.

The episode's mid-credits scene reveals Spector's third alter who had been teased throughout the series, Jake Lockley. Slater noted that all of the creatives worked to find the proper balance of how many overt hints to leave regarding Lockley, deciding to focus on viewers unfamiliar with the character from the comics and creating a satisfying mystery for them. Various moments in the past episodes were crafted to be times when Lockley could enter and exit. Isaac wanted to "bring something of myself to" the portrayal, deciding Lockley should speak in Spanish. Diab revealed there had originally been a larger Marvel Cinematic Universe (MCU) crossover in the credits scene, fitting with general convention that Marvel Studios' credits scenes help connect properties to the larger universe, which was removed to make it more a surprise that it did not connect back and help keep the series unique.

=== Casting ===
The episode stars Oscar Isaac as Marc Spector / Moon Knight, Steven Grant / Mr. Knight, and Jake Lockley, May Calamawy as Layla El-Faouly / Scarlet Scarab, Khalid Abdalla as Selim, Ann Akinjirin as Bobbi, Antonia Salib as Taweret, Karim El-Hakim and F. Murray Abraham as the on-set performer and voice of Khonshu, respectively, Sofia Danu and Saba Mubarak as the on-set performer and voice of Ammit, respectively, and Ethan Hawke as Arthur Harrow. Also starring are Diana Bermudez as Yatzil, Declan Hannigan as Horus's avatar, Hayley Konadu as Tefnut's avatar, and Nagisa Morimoto as Isis's avatar.

=== Design ===
External videos
- Marvel Studios' Moon Knight: End Credits Main On End Title Sequence – Episode 6 presents the episode's main-on-end title sequence, YouTube video from Perception's channel

El-Faouly's Scarlet Scarab costume is introduced in the episode, which featured wings, and hand-painted designs on the pants and neck. The series' main-on-end title sequence was designed by Perception. Each episode's end credits feature a new phase of the moon, starting with a crescent moon in the first episode.

=== Filming and visual effects ===
Filming took place at Origo Studios in Budapest, with Diab directing, and Gregory Middleton serving as cinematographer. Location filming occurred in Wadi Rum, Jordan. Salib was originally going to perform the scene where Taweret takes over El-Faouly's body, before Diab suggested that Calamawy act the scene moments before filming began. Salib helped choreograph the moment with Calamawy, and fed her lines in an earpiece before allowing her to perform on her own. Calamawy remembered from seeing Isaac's portrayal of Khonshu embodying Spector that it had to be a "weird sensation" adding, "Layla had just gone through so much so, I was like, what's a really intense way to show this happening? Because she's also someone who's resisting it. This is someone who's experiencing what being an avatar entails for the first time; not someone who's used to the process." For the mid-credits scene, Middleton said Lockley's reveal was shot in a way that deliberately stretched out the reveal, starting with almost seeing him and then focusing on his hand and his "kind of sinister" gestures as a way to still tease the possibility that it could be another character.

Visual effects for the episode were created by WetaFX, Framestore, Image Engine, Base FX, Cinesite, Method Studios, Mammal Studios, Soho VFX, Union VFX, and Keep Me Posted.

=== Music ===
The songs "The End" by Earl Grant and "A Man Without Love" by Engelbert Humperdinck are featured in the episode.

== Marketing ==
Marvel Studios originally promoted the episode as a series finale on Twitter, before reposting a tweet calling it a "season finale", indicating there was a possibility that the series could be renewed for a second season, despite no official indication at that time. The episode featured a QR code that when scanned allowed viewers to access a free digital copy of Moon Knight Annual #1. After the episode's release, Marvel announced merchandise inspired by the episode as part of its weekly "Marvel Must Haves" promotion for each episode of the series, including Scarlet Scarab, Ammit, and Temple of Khonshu statue Funko Pops, Moon Knight t-shirts, button-ups, and accessories.

== Release ==
"Gods and Monsters" was released on Disney+ on May 4, 2022. The episode, along with the rest of Moon Knight, was released on Ultra HD Blu-ray and Blu-ray on April 30, 2024.

== Reception ==
=== Viewership ===
According to market research company Parrot Analytics, which looks at consumer engagement in consumer research, streaming, downloads, and on social media, Moon Knight was the third most in-demand breakout show in the U.S. for the week of May 7–13. Breakout shows are defined as the most in-demand series that have premiered within the past 100 days. Moon Knight achieved 34.8 times the average series demand. Nielsen Media Research, which records streaming viewership on U.S. television screens, calculated that it was the third-most watched original series across streaming services for the week of May 2–8 with 715 million minutes watched, which was a series high and a 5% increase from the previous week. The streaming aggregator Reelgood, which monitors real-time data from 5 million users in the U.S. for original and acquired streaming programs and movies across subscription video-on-demand (SVOD) and ad-supported video-on-demand (AVOD) services, revealed that Moon Knight was the most-streamed series in the U.S. for the week ending May 11.

=== Critical response ===
The review aggregator website Rotten Tomatoes reports an 85% approval rating with an average rating of 7.90/10, based on 20 reviews. The site's critical consensus reads, "While Moon Knight's most interesting elements are somewhat eclipsed by a visual effects-laden showdown, "Gods and Monsters" brings this origin adventure to a satisfying close".

Writing for Collider, Maggie Boccella gave the episode an "A+", calling Moon Knight the best MCU Disney+ series with "a short, but no less sweet" finale. IGN's Matt Fowler gave the episode an 8 out of 10 and called the finale "the mostly action and effects-driven episode". Fowler said "Gods and Monsters" was able to "go full-tilt action without totally losing its humanity and fun". Den of Geek's Kristen Howard gave the episode 4 out of 5 stars.

=== Accolades ===
For the 74th Primetime Creative Arts Emmy Awards, Meghan Kasperlik, Martin Mandeville, Richard Davies, and Wilberth Gonzalez were nominated for Outstanding Fantasy/Sci-Fi Costumes; Bonnie Wild, Mac Smith, Kimberly Patrick, Vanessa Lapato, Matt Hartman, Teresa Eckton, Tim Farrell, Leo Marcil, Joel Raabe, Ian Chase, Anele Onyekwere, Stephanie Lowry, Carl Sealove, Dan O'Connell, and John Cucci won for Outstanding Sound Editing for a Limited or Anthology Series, Movie or Special; Bonnie Wild, Scott R. Lewis, Tamás Csaba, and Scott Michael Smith were nominated for Outstanding Sound Mixing for a Limited or Anthology Series or Movie; and Daren Nop, Jamel Blissat, Estelle Darnault, and Sara Leal were nominated for Outstanding Stunt Performance. Kasperlik chose this episode as her consideration for the Emmys since it showed the various costumes "in all their glory" and was "a great showcase of all of the hard work my team put into the show".
