= Summon the Suit =

- Moon Knight episode
- Promotional poster
- Episode no.: Episode 2
- Directed by: Aaron Moorhead; Justin Benson
- Written by: Michael Kastelein
- Cinematography by: Andrew Droz Palermo
- Editing by: Joan Sobel
- Original release date: April 6, 2022
- Running time: 53 minutes

Cast
- Shaun Scott as Crawley; Alexander Cobb as J.B.; Darwin Shaw as Dornfeld

Episode chronology
← Previous "The Goldfish Problem"	Next → "The Friendly Type"

"Summon the Suit" is the second episode of the American television miniseries Moon Knight, based on Marvel Comics featuring the character Moon Knight. It follows Steven Grant as he continues to learn of his dissociative identity disorder (DID) and the deadly mystery involving Egyptian gods his other identity, Marc Spector, is involved in. The episode is set in the Marvel Cinematic Universe (MCU), sharing continuity with the films of the franchise. It was written by Michael Kastelein and directed by Aaron Moorhead and Justin Benson.

Oscar Isaac stars as Marc Spector / Moon Knight and Steven Grant / Mr. Knight, alongside May Calamawy, Ann Akinjirin, Karim El-Hakim, David Ganly, F. Murray Abraham, and Ethan Hawke. Moorhead and Benson joined the series in January 2021 to direct two episodes of the series. Filming took place at Origo Studios in Budapest, with location filming throughout the city.

"Summon the Suit" was released on Disney+ on April 6, 2022. Critics praised the episode for its action sequences and the performances of the cast, though some criticism was aimed at the episode's focus on story over action.

== Plot ==
After being fired for damaging the bathroom of the National Art Gallery, Steven Grant uses the keycard he found in his apartment to access his storage locker containing the scarab. Grant's "reflection" reveals that he is Marc Spector, another identity living in Grant's body, an American mercenary, and the current avatar of the Egyptian moon god Khonshu. Spector tries to convince Grant to let him resume control of their body, but Grant refuses and flees. He is confronted by Layla, Spector's wife who was unaware of Grant's existence, before being arrested by police officers working for Arthur Harrow.

Harrow reveals that he was Khonshu's previous avatar until he chose to follow Ammit instead, and that he seeks the scarab to find her tomb and resurrect her so that she can purge humanity of evil. Layla rescues Grant, but Harrow summons an invisible jackal-like monster to pursue them. Grant summons a suit similar to Spector's and fights the jackal, but is overpowered and allows Spector to take control. Spector kills the jackal but loses the scarab to Harrow.

Khonshu angrily confronts Spector, who promises to find Ammit's tomb before Harrow does. Khonshu threatens to claim Layla as his next avatar should Spector fail before sending him to Egypt.

== Production ==
=== Development ===
In August 2019, Marvel Studios announced a series based on Moon Knight was being developed for the streaming service Disney+. In January 2021, director duo Aaron Moorhead and Justin Benson joined the series to direct two episodes, including the second episode. They worked alongside lead director Mohamed Diab to ensure a consistent approach to the series. Executive producers include Marvel Studios' Kevin Feige, Louis D'Esposito, Victoria Alonso, Brad Winderbaum, and Grant Curtis, star Oscar Isaac, Diab, and head writer Jeremy Slater. The second episode, titled "Summon the Suit", was written by Michael Kastelein.

=== Writing ===
Moorhead wanted to establish the relationship between Grant and Spector as a "kind of brotherly relationship where they bicker because they want different things, but they also care for each other in strange ways". He felt that their conversation in the storage locker is when they directly talk to each other "at length for the first time", and that they "bear each other's souls" in their conversation with the broken pyramid mirror. Moorhead also stated that Mr. Knight was Grant's "vision of a cool guy, a svelte man", and his scenes were based on making "everything around making losing the fight frightening and scary". Both Moorhead and Benson decided to make Grant fall down comedically as they felt that Grant realized being an actual hero is more difficult than summoning the suit.

=== Casting ===
The episode stars Oscar Isaac as Marc Spector / Moon Knight and Steven Grant / Mr. Knight, May Calamawy as Layla El-Faouly, Karim El-Hakim and F. Murray Abraham as the on-set performer and voice of Khonshu, respectively, Ann Akinjirin as Bobbi Kennedy, David Ganly as Billy Fitzgerald, and Ethan Hawke as Arthur Harrow. Also appearing are Shaun Scott as Crawley, Alexander Cobb as J.B., and Darwin Shaw as Dornfeld.

=== Design ===
External videos
- Marvel Studios' Moon Knight: End Credits Main On End Title Sequence – Episode 2 presents the episode's main-on-end title sequence, YouTube video from Perception's channel

The series' main-on-end title sequence was designed by Perception. Moon Knight's mummy bandages on his costume was inspired by his depiction in the Universe X comics, while Slater pitched the costume to be designed so that it conjured around Spector. Each episode's end credits feature a new phase of the moon, starting with a crescent moon in the previous episode.

=== Filming and visual effects ===
Filming took place at Origo Studios in Budapest, with Benson and Moorehead directing, and Andrew Droz Palermo serving as cinematographer. Location filming occurred throughout Budapest. The episode ends with a shot of the pyramids outside the city of Cairo; Diab had hoped to show Egypt "as it is" given previous media depictions of the country have shown "just pyramids and the desert behind it" without the modern buildings of Cairo near by. When filming scenes with Grant and Spector, Isaac chose to treat them as two separate characters and filmed each of their scenes on separate days.

Visual effects for the episode were created by Framestore, Soho VFX, Mammal Studios, and Keep Me Posted.

=== Music ===
The Egyptian song "El Melouk" by Ahmed Saad ft. 3enba and Double Zuksh, is featured during the episode's credits sequence.

== Marketing ==
Ahead of the episode's release, Marvel released a poster of Grant's gift shop name tag, with Adam Barnhardt at ComicBook.com calling it a "peculiar choice" for a poster. A QR code was included in the episode that allowed viewers to access a free digital copy of the comic Werewolf by Night #33 in which Moon Knight appears. After the episode's release, Marvel announced merchandise inspired by the episode as part of its weekly "Marvel Must Haves" promotion for each episode of the series, including Mr. Knight and Harrow Funko Pops, a Mr. Knight Marvel Legends figure, apparel, jewelry, and accessories.

== Release ==
"Summon the Suit" was released on Disney+ on April 6, 2022. The episode, along with the rest of Moon Knight, was released on Ultra HD Blu-ray and Blu-ray on April 30, 2024.

== Reception ==
=== Viewership ===
According to market research company Parrot Analytics, which looks at consumer engagement in consumer research, streaming, downloads, and on social media, Moon Knight ranked as the sixth most in-demand digital original series for the week of April 2–8. The series achieved demand 34 times higher than the average show, reflecting a substantial 65% increase from the previous week. Nielsen Media Research, which records streaming viewership on U.S. television screens, reported that it was the third-most watched original series across streaming services for the week of April 4–10 with 608 million minutes watched, which was a 45% increase from the previous week. The streaming aggregator Reelgood, which monitors real-time data from 5 million users in the U.S. for original and acquired streaming programs and movies across subscription video-on-demand (SVOD) and ad-supported video-on-demand (AVOD) services, reported that it was the second most-streamed program in the U.S. for the week ending April 6. JustWatch, a guide to streaming content with access to data from more than 20 million users around the world, estimated that Moon Knight was the second most-streamed series in the U.S. from April 4–10. Whip Media, which tracks viewership data for the more than 21 million worldwide users of its TV Time app, revealed that it was the most-streamed original series for the week ending April 10.

=== Critical response ===
The review aggregator website Rotten Tomatoes reports a 90% approval rating with an average rating of 7.20/10, based on 20 reviews. The site's critical consensus reads, "Steven gets to know his alter ego Marc—or is it the other way around?—in 'Summon the Suit,' an expository installment that packs in plenty of fun to make the info dump go down smooth."

Matt Fowler at IGN gave the episode a 7 out of 10, saying that Isaac continued to dazzle, but felt that by the time Grant and Harrow had their conversation, Grant's bewilderment element had run thin. Fowler felt that Grant's delirium worked well in the previous episode, but now that the puzzle pieces were starting to fall in place, that part of Grant felt like an anchor holding the show back. He said that questions were starting to feel like they were building up at an alarming rate and the episode "only let a little air out of the balloon, answer-wise". Fowler pondered if the Egyptian gods were truly gods, or if they were aliens based on what we have learned about Thor and Asgard, as well as with what Eternals (2021) told us about gods and myths in various ancient cultures. Fowler also felt that when Spector took over for Grant and became Moon Knight, it was rewarding because it was a better showing of Moon Knight after the off screen antics in the previous episode. In conclusion, he said the episode "felt like the second half of a two-parter, setting us up for a different dynamic going forward on a path that hopefully provides more context and backstory". Kirsten Howard writing for Den of Geek gave the episode 4 out of 5 stars, saying that it was heartbreaking how it appeared that many of Grant's interests were unwittingly Layla's passions, maybe in an effort to stay close to her. Howard commended the series on how it used reflective surfaces to underscore the conflict between Spector and Grant, calling it sublime. They praised Hawke, saying he was so good that they almost bought into Harrow's beliefs about judging people before they do anything wrong. Howard noted that comic purists may be upset that Grant was the one in the Mr. Knight suit, but thought that he may grow into it over time.

Writing for The A.V. Club, Manuel Betancourt gave the episode a "B", feeling that due to the amount of exposition, the episode dragged more than it probably should have, but as a trade off, it allowed for the viewers to learn more about Spector, Khonshu, and even Harrow. He said that we were bound to get answers so having it be done through Grant addressing Spector was probably for the best. Betancourt compared Harrow believing that people could be judged and punished even for things that they have not done to the plot of Minority Report (2002) mixed with Egyptian mythology. He complimented Abraham's vocal performance as Khonshu, saying "only he could make this skeletal moon god feel imperious yet not without an unintentionally dry sense of humor". Betancourt went on to say that the overall cast was one of the biggest strengths of the entire series and the introduction of Calamawy's El-Faouly only made it stronger. Maggie Boccella from Collider gave the episode a "B-", feeling that the episode "continues to worryingly sidestep its character's mental illness". She felt that the depiction of Mr. Knight may be a disappointment to some fans after the show's marketing material advertised him as a "capable, sinister alter in Marc's system, not Steven's bumbling idea of a supersuit". Boccella felt that it was a good thing that it appeared that most of the trailer footage has now been featured, allowing the audience to move forward with no idea of what would come next.
