= The Friendly Type =

- Moon Knight episode
- Promotional poster
- Episode no.: Episode 3
- Directed by: Mohamed Diab
- Written by: Beau DeMayo; Peter Cameron; Sabir Pirzada
- Cinematography by: Gregory Middleton
- Editing by: Ahmed Hafez
- Original release date: April 13, 2022
- Running time: 53 minutes

Cast
- Barbara Rosenblat as Forger; Diana Bermudez as Yatzil / Hathor; Declan Hannigan as Horus's avatar; Hayley Konadu as Tefnut's avatar; Nagisa Morimoto as Isis's avatar; Loic Mabanza as Bek; Jalil Naciri as Alpha; Mohamed el Achi as Beta

Episode chronology
← Previous "Summon the Suit"	Next → "The Tomb"

"The Friendly Type" is the third episode of the American television miniseries Moon Knight, based on Marvel Comics featuring the character Moon Knight. It follows Marc Spector as he returns to Egypt to find Ammit's tomb before Arthur Harrow does. The episode is set in the Marvel Cinematic Universe (MCU), sharing continuity with the films of the franchise. It was written by Beau DeMayo and Peter Cameron & Sabir Pirzada and directed by Mohamed Diab.

Oscar Isaac stars as Marc Spector / Moon Knight and Steven Grant / Mr. Knight alongside Ethan Hawke as Arthur Harrow. May Calamawy, Khalid Abdalla, Ann Akinjirin, David Ganly, Karim El-Hakim, F. Murray Abraham, and Gaspard Ulliel also star. Diab joined the series by October 2020 to direct four episodes. Filming took place at Origo Studios in Budapest, with location filming occurring in Jordan.

"The Friendly Type" was released on Disney+ on April 13, 2022. Critics praised the episode for its action scenes, the expanded backstory of Layla and Spector, and the eclipse sequence, but felt the episode was at times too exposition heavy.

== Plot ==
Arthur Harrow and his followers discover the location of Ammit's tomb. In Cairo, Marc Spector and Steven Grant both experience several unusual blackouts while tracking down a lead to Harrow's location. After they fail to obtain information from Harrow's followers, Khonshu causes a solar eclipse to call for a council of the Ennead and their avatars, who summon Spector to a chamber inside the Great Pyramid of Giza. Khonshu and Spector attempt to inform the gods of Harrow's plan to free Ammit, but the latter successfully denies the accusation when summoned.

The avatar of Hathor, Yatzil, tells Spector to find the sarcophagus of a medjay who knew of the location of Ammit's tomb. He later encounters Layla, who takes him to meet with Anton Mogart, an acquaintance of Layla who owns the medjay's sarcophagus. However, the meeting goes awry when Harrow arrives and destroys the sarcophagus, forcing Spector, Grant and Layla to fight off Mogart's men and escape into the desert. Grant is able to assemble a set of fragments from the sarcophagus into an ancient star map, but the map is two thousand years out of date.

Khonshu uses his powers to briefly turn back the night sky to resemble the map, allowing Grant and Layla to find the location of Ammit's tomb. However, Khonshu is then imprisoned by the other gods, leaving Grant and Spector's body unconscious and powerless.

== Production ==
=== Development ===
In August 2019, Marvel Studios announced a series based on Moon Knight was being developed for the streaming service Disney+. By October 2020, Mohamed Diab was set to direct four episodes, including the third episode. Diab executive produces alongside Marvel Studios' Kevin Feige, Louis D'Esposito, Victoria Alonso, Brad Winderbaum, and Grant Curtis, star Oscar Isaac, and head writer Jeremy Slater. The third episode, titled "The Friendly Type", was written by DeMayo and Cameron & Pirzada.

=== Writing ===
Mr. Knight's knowledge of Egyptology allows him to solve various puzzles and assemble the star map. Mr. Knight's approach to solving conflict was described as "using his wits and puzzle solving", which "helps to complement Marc's Super Hero persona Moon Knight" who resorts to more violent methods. Khonshu was also seen as an outcast among other Egyptian gods due to him "waging a one-god war on perceived injustices". He is portrayed as using Spector in order to fulfill enacting his "version of divine justice". Diab described Khonshu's demands of Spector as being "something very brutal and very hard for Marc", which results from Khonshu granting him powers after resurrecting Spector from his death, which came with a "very, very high price".

=== Casting ===
The episode stars Oscar Isaac as Marc Spector / Moon Knight and Steven Grant / Mr. Knight, May Calamawy as Layla El-Faouly, Khalid Abdalla as Selim, Ann Akinjirin as Bobbi Kennedy, David Ganly as Billy Fitzgerald, Karim El-Hakim and F. Murray Abraham as the on-set performer and voice of Khonshu, respectively, Gaspard Ulliel as Anton Mogart, and Ethan Hawke as Arthur Harrow. The episode premiered after Ulliel's death in January 2022, as a result of a skiing incident, with the episode being dedicated in memory of him. Also appearing are Barbara Rosenblat as Forger, Diana Bermudez as Yatzil, Hathor's avatar, Declan Hannigan as Horus's avatar, Hayley Konadu as Tefnut's avatar, Nagisa Morimoto as Isis's avatar, Loic Mabanza as Bek, Jalil Naciri as Alpha, and Mohamed El Achi as Beta.

=== Design ===
External videos
- Marvel Studios' Moon Knight: End Credits Main On End Title Sequence – Episode 3 presents the episode's main-on-end title sequence, YouTube video from Perception's channel

The Mogart's Mansion set included two Louvre-inspired glass pyramids that were built for filming, that included gold and red lighting, with a horse arena also built. The series' main-on-end title sequence was designed by Perception. Each episode's end credits feature a new phase of the moon, starting with a crescent moon in the first episode.

=== Filming and visual effects ===
Filming took place at Origo Studios in Budapest, with Diab directing, and Gregory Middleton serving as cinematographer. Location filming occurred in Wadi Rum, Jordan. Middleton noted the scene with Spector fighting Mogart was originally designed to take place in a dark indoors location and making Moon Knight like a boogeyman where "he pokes out, he kills people and disappears". Middleton said that Diab fought hard to get the horses because he really wanted to feature Egyptian jousting and having that all take place in a large arena made it better to "really see what's going on, and you really see Moon Knight be as awful as he can be, which is horrifying Steven".

Visual effects for the episode were created by Crafty Apes, Image Engine, Cinesite, WetaFX, Monsters Aliens Robots Zombies, Framestore, Soho VFX, Base FX, Method Studios, and Mammal Studios. For the scene where Khonshu reverses the night sky, Weta researched NASA star charts and used parallax to create the effect.

== Marketing ==
Unlike previous episodes, there was not a QR code to scan. However, scanning one of the previous QR codes allowed viewers to access a free digital copy of Midnight Man's debut comic, Moon Knight vol. 1 #3. After the episode's release, Marvel announced merchandise inspired by the episode as part of its weekly "Marvel Must Haves" promotion for each episode of the series, including Khonshu and El-Faouly Funko Pops, apparel, jewelry, and accessories.

== Release ==
"The Friendly Type" was released on Disney+ on April 13, 2022. The episode, along with the rest of Moon Knight, was released on Ultra HD Blu-ray and Blu-ray on April 30, 2024.

== Reception ==
=== Viewership ===
According to market research company Parrot Analytics, which looks at consumer engagement in consumer research, streaming, downloads, and on social media, Moon Knight was the second most in-demand breakout show in the U.S. for the week of April 16–22. Breakout shows are defined as the most in-demand series that have premiered within the past 100 days. Moon Knight achieved 34.7 times the average series demand. Nielsen Media Research, which records streaming viewership on U.S. television screens, reported that it was the third-most watched original series across streaming services for the week of April 11–17 with 638 million minutes watched, which was a 5% increase from the previous week. The streaming aggregator Reelgood, which monitors real-time data from 5 million users in the U.S. for original and acquired streaming programs and movies across subscription video-on-demand (SVOD) and ad-supported video-on-demand (AVOD) services, revealed that it was the most-streamed program in the U.S. for the week ending April 13. Whip Media, which tracks viewership data for the more than 21 million worldwide users of its TV Time app, calculated that Moon Knight was the top streaming original series in the U.S. for the week ending April 17.

=== Critical response ===
The review aggregator website Rotten Tomatoes reports a 94% approval rating with an average rating of 7.70/10, based on 16 reviews. The site's critical consensus reads, "The action relocates to Cairo in a transitionary installment that fleshes out Moon Knight's mythology while giving plenty more fun material for Oscar Isaac to play with."

Writing for Collider, Maggie Boccella gave the episode an "A-", saying that the episode hit its stride after Khonshu created the eclipse to draw out the other gods because the episode was "embracing the fantastic". The gathering of the gods gave Boccella vibes of The Mummy (1999) with all of the "opulence and mysticism and none of the orientalism or fetishization". She felt that part of the appeal to the series is the almost total disconnect from the rest of the MCU, even with the mysticism, the episode felt more grounded without other superheroes or the multiverse thanks to it leading towards something ancient. Manuel Betancourt of The A.V. Club gave the episode a "B" and was happy that after monster fights and night time fights in the previous episodes, "The Friendly Type" featured daytime brawls, and as a result "we get to see some actual hand-to-hand combat, with no masks, no CG and nothing to get in the way of what we're witnessing". He felt that Spector could be calming in his previous screentime, but in this episode he was just as lost as the audience when he was used to being in control. Betancourt noted that it was most obvious when Spector re-gained control of the body, but was now holding a knife, while Grant denied having anything to do with what had just happened. Betancourt praised Calamawy's performance, calling her transfixing in the passport scene. Overall Betancourt felt that the episode had "exciting action sequences", but "struggled in explaining its intricate mythology in an engaging way", feeling that their may have been too much exposition.

IGN's Matt Fowler gave the episode an 8 out of 10 and called the episode the "most action-packed and illuminating entry so far". He enjoyed getting more info on Layla and Spector's backstory and was happy that Layla was given more to do this episode. Fowler called Grant and Khonshu's sky scene at the end of the episode a "sublime visual treat", calling it an exciting conclusion to the episode that's sets up a aesthetician hopeless situation due to Khonshu being imprisoned. He felt that it bodes well for Layla as the episode showed that she was able to handle herself well in dangerous situations, calling her "cut from the cloth of a Lara Croft or an Indiana Jones." Overall, Fowler thought that "Moon Knight felt like a swashbuckling team-up this week, playing things fast and funny". Giving the episode 3 out of 5 stars, Kirsten Howard of Den of Geek felt that the episode was a frustrating "puzzle-solving diversion" considering there are only six episodes total. Although, they were happy that the episode revealed more about Spector and Layla. Howard called the eclipse scene one of the wildest in the entire MCU, saying that the "show is clearly not afraid to go for broke in pursuit of its vision". However they were frustrated watching the episode due to the uneven tone, but also how the gods handled the confrontation with Harrow as he used Spector's DID as a weapon. Overall, Howard felt that the episode was a step back after a "pretty well-paced and character-focused episode last week".

=== Accolades ===
Abraham was nominated for Outstanding Character Voice-Over Performance at the 74th Primetime Creative Arts Emmy Awards.
