= The Goldfish Problem =

- Moon Knight episode
- Promotional poster
- Episode no.: Episode 1
- Directed by: Mohamed Diab
- Written by: Jeremy Slater
- Cinematography by: Gregory Middleton
- Editing by: Cedric Nairn-Smith
- Original release date: March 30, 2022
- Running time: 47 minutes

Cast
- Lucy Thackeray as Donna; Saffron Hocking as Dylan; Shaun Scott as Crawley

Episode chronology
← Previous —	Next → "Summon the Suit"

"The Goldfish Problem" is the first episode of the American television miniseries Moon Knight, based on Marvel Comics featuring the character Moon Knight. It follows Steven Grant as he begins to learn of his dissociative identity disorder (DID) and the deadly mystery involving Egyptian gods his other identity, Marc Spector, is involved in. The episode is set in the Marvel Cinematic Universe (MCU), sharing continuity with the films of the franchise. It was written by head writer Jeremy Slater and directed by Mohamed Diab.

Oscar Isaac stars as Marc Spector / Moon Knight and Steven Grant, alongside May Calamawy, Karim El-Hakim, F. Murray Abraham, and Ethan Hawke. Slater joined the series in November 2019 to serve as head writer and executive produce, while Diab joined in October 2020 to direct four episodes of the series. Filming took place at Origo Studios in Budapest, with location filming throughout Hungary and in Slovenia.

"The Goldfish Problem" was released on Disney+ on March 30, 2022. The episode received mostly positive reviews from critics, who praised the performances of Isaac and Hawke and its tonal departure from the MCU, but some pointed out its lack of plot developments.

== Plot ==
Steven Grant, a gift shop worker at the National Art Gallery in London, occasionally suffers from blackouts. After going to sleep one night, he finds himself waking up in the Austrian Alps, witnessing a cult meeting led by religious zealot Arthur Harrow, who demands a scarab Grant unknowingly had in his possession. He escapes from Harrow and is nearly killed, but is saved by a mysterious voice in his head.

After waking up in his home, noticing several oddities and returning from a misscheduled date, Grant realizes that two days have passed since he went to sleep. He later finds a hidden phone and keycard in his flat, and while searching through missed calls from a woman named Layla, she calls. Grant is confused upon her calling him "Marc".

The next day, Grant is confronted by Harrow at work, who reveals that he is a servant of the Egyptian goddess Ammit. Later that night, Harrow summons a jackal-like monster that attacks Grant at the museum. Just as Grant is cornered by the monster, his reflection in the mirror tells Grant to let him take control. Grant agrees, transforming into a cloaked warrior who kills the monster.

== Production ==
=== Development ===
In August 2019, Marvel Studios announced a series based on Moon Knight was being developed for the streaming service Disney+. That November, Jeremy Slater was hired to serve as the head writer of the series, while Egyptian director Mohamed Diab was set to direct four episodes by October 2020, including the first episode. Slater and Diab executive produce alongside Marvel Studios' Kevin Feige, Louis D'Esposito, Victoria Alonso, Brad Winderbaum, and Grant Curtis and star Oscar Isaac. The first episode, titled "The Goldfish Problem", was written by Slater.

=== Writing ===
Diab wanted to include the "black comedy" scene of Steven Grant ordering a steak, despite being vegan, as a way to show DID was not just him blacking out, but that it was "destroying his life, even his romantic life" and a way for the audience to connect to Grant.

=== Casting ===
The episode stars Oscar Isaac as Marc Spector / Moon Knight and Steven Grant, May Calamawy as Layla El-Faouly, Karim El-Hakim and F. Murray Abraham as the on-set performer and voice of Khonshu, respectively, and Ethan Hawke as Arthur Harrow. Also appearing are Lucy Thackeray as Donna, Saffron Hocking as Dylan, Shaun Scott as Crawley, and Alexander Cobb as J.B.

=== Design ===
External videos
- Marvel Studios' Moon Knight: End Credits Main On End Title Sequence – Episode 1 presents the episode's main-on-end title sequence, YouTube video from Perception's channel

The series' main-on-end title sequence was designed by Perception. Each episode's end credits feature a new phase of the moon, starting with a crescent moon in this episode.

=== Filming and visual effects ===
Filming took place at Origo Studios in Budapest, with Diab directing, and Gregory Middleton serving as cinematographer. Location filming occurred throughout Budapest and in Slovenia, with filming taking place in Szentendre, Hungary, at the beginning of May 2021. Hawke suggested Harrow's introductory scene where he puts glass shards in his sandals because he wanted the character to have his "full-page drawing" that villains get in the comics. Noting that he had a cane but no limp, he began to think about "spiritual people who go crazy, who get mad on their own spiritual pride, and how often that turns inward and you see that they're secretly self-lacerating in some way and hating themselves".

Visual effects for the episode were created by Union VFX, Framestore, Soho VFX, Zoic Studios, Mammal Studios, and Crafty Apes.

=== Music ===
The songs "Every Grain of Sand" by Bob Dylan, "A Man Without Love" by Engelbert Humperdinck, and "Wake Me Up Before You Go-Go" by Wham! are featured in the episode.

== Marketing ==
Ahead of the episode's release, Marvel released a poster of a goldfish in a blender. Commentators noted the lack of context to the release, but felt the fish was important enough to the story in the episode or series to warrant them being featured on a poster. A QR code was included in the episode that allowed viewers to access a free digital copy of Moon Knight's debut comic, Werewolf by Night #32. After the episode's release, Marvel announced merchandise inspired by the episode as part of its weekly "Marvel Must Haves" promotion for each episode of the series, including Moon Knight Funko Pops, Marvel Legends, Hot Toys, and Marvel Select figures, posters, accessories, and apparel.

== Release ==
"The Goldfish Problem" was released on Disney+ on March 30, 2022. The episode, along with the rest of Moon Knight, was released on Ultra HD Blu-ray and Blu-ray on April 30, 2024.

== Reception ==
=== Viewership ===
According to market research company Parrot Analytics, which looks at consumer engagement in consumer research, streaming, downloads, and on social media, Moon Knight was the second leading new series on Disney+ following its premiere on March 30, 2022, and ranked as the fourth new breakout show between March 26 and April 1, 2022, which are the most in-demand series that have premiered in the past 100 days, achieving 20.7 times the average series demand. Analytics company Samba TV, which gathers viewership data from certain smart TVs and content providers, reported that the premiere was watched by an estimated 1.8 million households in the first five days of release. This was behind the premiere of Loki (2.5M) and was tied with the premiere of The Falcon and the Winter Soldier, which achieved that viewership over three days. Samba TV also reported Moon Knight was watched by 277,000 households in the United Kingdom, 88,000 in Germany, and 11,000 in Australia in that same time frame. Nielsen Media Research, which records streaming viewership on U.S. television screens, announced that Moon Knight was the fifth-most watched original series across streaming services for the week of March 28 – April 3 with 418 million minutes watched. This was the lowest amount of minutes for all of the live action MCU Disney+ series, but not far behind WandaVision (434 million) and The Falcon and the Winter Soldier (495 million). JustWatch, a guide to streaming content with access to data from more than 20 million users around the world, estimated that Moon Knight was the top series in the U.S. for the week ending April 3.

=== Critical response ===
The review aggregator website Rotten Tomatoes reports a 92% approval rating with an average rating of 8.00/10, based on 24 reviews. The site's critical consensus reads, "'The Goldfish Problem' raises more questions than it answers about this new hero's identity, but Oscar Isaac's varied performance firmly answers why viewers should stick around for more."

Leah Marilla Thomas at Vulture gave the episode 4 out of 5 stars, saying the mystery of Grant and Spector as part of the character's dissociative identity disorder was "a fun twist on the 'secret identity' trope in superhero fiction and a compelling place to start" the series. She noted how the series seemed to be handling its more brutal violence by having it occur during Grant's blackouts when he switches to Spector, allowing Disney+ to "have their cake and eat it too". Matt Fowler of IGN gave the episode a 7 out of 10, saying that it could be a bit jarring how disconnected the series seemed to be from the rest of the MCU, especially after the previous Disney+ series were heavily tied to the film Avengers: Endgame (2019). Fowler compared the episode to one from Marvel Television's series that did not have MCU connections, although he said "it works for now since Steven is in a very odd cerebral prison, as it were". In conclusion, Fowler enjoyed Isaac and Hawkes' performances, but argued the episode left viewers with many questions.

Writing for The A.V. Club, Manuel Betancourt gave the episode a "B+", praising the decision to feature Grant's blackouts as a storytelling tactic, giving the episode a "different narrative rhythm" from any of the previous MCU series. Betancourt also praised Isaac's performance as Grant, saying that as a result, the biggest question of the episode was "What is happening to Steven Grant?" as opposed to "Who is Moon Knight, anyway?" Den of Geek's Kristen Howard called the episode a "pretty solid introduction" to the world of the series, and that it seemed like Isaac was granted "Johnny Depp in Pirates of the Caribbean-level performance freedom" in portraying Grant. Howard stated it was refreshing to see a MCU show without an "ambitious amount" of easter eggs from the wider MCU and called the MCU version Grant compared to the comics version "admittedly quite irritating", but was interested in see Grant's personality in contrast with Spector. They gave the episode 3 out of 5 stars.

The episode was the target of review-bombing on IMDb and Rotten Tomatoes's audience scores because of the episode's mention of the Armenian genocide, with deniers saying the episode was acting as propaganda.

=== Accolades ===
Slater was nominated at for Best Writing in a Streaming Limited or Anthology Series at the 2nd Hollywood Critics Association TV Awards for his work on the episode.
