= Moon Knight (disambiguation) =

Moon Knight is a Marvel Comics superhero.

Moon Knight may also refer to:

- Moon Knight (miniseries), a 2022 Disney+ miniseries
- Moon Knight (Marvel Cinematic Universe), a fictional character in the Marvel Cinematic Universe
