= Hetepet =

In the Egyptian language, Hetepet was the word that meant Offerings It was used in multiple occasions, but most prominently in

- Sekhet Hetepet, meaning field of offerings, a title for Aaru
- Nebet Hetepet, meaning lady of offerings (the majority of scholars consider this to be understood in a sexual sense), a title of the goddess Hathor.

This should not be confused with Nebet Het, meaning our lady of the house, the Egyptian name of Nephthys
