= Sabir Pirzada =

Pakistani-American television and comics writer

- Born: Sabir Pirzada
- Area: Writer
- Notable works: Ms. Marvel, Moon Knight, Ms. Marvel: The New Mutant, Ms. Marvel: Mutant Menace, Spirits of Vengeance

Sabir Pirzada is a Pakistani-American television and comics writer and producer who has written for Marvel Comics and independent comics. He is best known for his work on the Marvel Studios' Moon Knight and Ms. Marvel streaming shows and co-writing Ms. Marvel comic books alongside actress Iman Vellani.

== Career ==
Pirzada's first comic book, Affliction, was published in 2014 by Arcana Comics. In television, he got his start as a writer's assistant on Person of Interest. This opened doors to getting him jobs as a TV writer. He was part of Disney-ABC's Writing Program in 2017 after which he became a staff writer on The Crossing. After working on Roswell, New Mexico, he was picked to be a part of the writer's room for Ms. Marvel and then Moon Knight. In March 2022, it was announced that he was developing a Nova show, but after two years, he was replaced by Ed Bernero.

In September 2022, it was announced that he would be writing the two-issue tie-in comic Dark Web: Ms. Marvel, with art by Francesco Mortarino. In February 2023, it was announced that he and Mortarino would also be the creative team for Cult of Carnage: Misery, about the character of Liz Allan, for Marvel's "Summer of Symbiotes."

In July 2023, after the character of Kamala Khan had been killed and then resurrected during the 2023 Hellfire Gala, Marvel announced that she would star in a new four-issue mini-series, Ms. Marvel: The New Mutant, set during the Fall of X and written by Pirzada and Iman Vellani. In November, it was announced that they would write a follow-up mini-series, Ms. Marvel: Mutant Menace.

In February 2024, Image Comics announced that Pirzada would write a science fiction anthology comic called Dandelion. The book's artists include Martín Morazzo , Vanesa R. Del Rey, Eric Koda, Roy Allan Martinez, Gegê Schall, Thomas Campi, Adrian Rivero, Juha Veltti, and Marquis Rogers. In July, he was announced as one of the creators involved in Pornsak Pichetshote's "The Horizon Experiment," a group of five one-shot comics by creators from marginalized backgrounds. Pirzada's issue, The Sacred Damned, would be about a "Muslim John Constantine."

In June 2024, Marvel announced that he would be writing Spirits of Vengeance, a new six-issue mini-series about various Ghost Riders, and Venom War: Lethal Protector, starring Silver Sable and a new Symbiote Squad. In December 2024, it was announced that he would follow up the Spirits of Vengeance mini-series with a new book called Spirits of Violence.

== Personal life ==
Sabir went to UC Berkeley and earned a B.A. in Psychology. In his spare time, he tutored prisoners at San Quentin State Prison. He is a practicing Muslim.

== Bibliography ==
=== Marvel Comics ===
- Cult of Carnage: Misery #1-5 (2023)
- Ghost Rider:
  - Spirits of Vengeance vol. 2 #1-6 (2024-205)
  - Spirits of Violence #1-present (2025–present)
- Marvel's Voices:
  - Marvel's Voices: Identity #1, short story "Seeing Red" (2021)
  - Marvel's Voices: Identity vol. 2 #1, short story "Fool Me Twice" (2022)
- Ms. Marvel:
  - Dark Web: Ms. Marvel #1-2 (2022-2023)
  - Ms. Marvel: The New Mutant #1-4, co-written with Iman Vellani (2023)
  - Ms. Marvel: Mutant Menace #1-4, co-written with Iman Vellani (2024)
  - Ms. Marvel Annual vol. 3 #1, co-written with Iman Vellani (2024)
  - Marvel 85th Anniversary Special #1, short story "The Herald of Tomorrow," co-written with Iman Vellani (2024)
- Venom War: Lethal Protectors #1-3 (2024)

=== Other Comics ===
- Affliction #1-4 (2013) (Arcana Comics)
- Dandelion (2024) (Image Comics)
- The Horizon Experiment: The Sacred Damned #1 (Image Comics)
- Violets (2020) (Black Ocean Productions)

== Filmography ==
Year	Title	Role	Notes
2015-2016	Person of Interest	Writer	Episodes: "Karma" and "Sotto Voce"
2018	The Crossing	Writer	Episode: "The Long Morrow"
2019	Roswell, New Mexico	Writer	Episodes: "Where Have All the Cowboys Gone?" and "Songs About Texas"
2022	Moon Knight	Writer/Producer	Episodes: "The Friendly Type," "The Tomb," and "Gods and Monsters"
2022	Ms. Marvel	Writer/Producer	Episode: "Seeing Red"
2022	Thor: Love and Thunder	Writer (uncredited)	
2023	Star Wars: The Bad Batch	Writer	Episode: "Metamorphosis"
2024	FBI	Writer	Episode: "Pledges"
