= Origo Studios =

Hungarian film and television production studio

General information
- Location: Budapest, Felsőkert u. 9, 1151, Hungary
- Opening: 2010

Origo Studios is a Hungarian film and television production studio located in Budapest.

== Stages and facilities ==
Soundstage & Stage	Notes	Area
Soundstage 1		1,982 m^{2}
Soundstage 2		1,982 m^{2}
Soundstage 3		2,662 m^{2}
Soundstage 4		2,662 m^{2}
Soundstage 5		1,994 m^{2}
Soundstage 6		4,373 m^{2}
Soundstage 7		1,184 m^{2}
Soundstage 8		1,184 m^{2}
Stage 9		216 m^{2}
Stage 10		208 m^{2}
Stage 11	for virtual set, multimedia, vfx, TV	726 m^{2}
Green Studio	greenbox stage	100 m^{2}

- 23×18,5×3 m water tank
- 4 ha of backlot

=== Office buildings to house production offices ===
With 4 office buildings, approx. 4,000 m^{2} of office space.

=== Warehouses and workshops ===
14 warehouses and workshops totaling 8,434 m^{2} available on-site.

== Productions ==
=== Television ===
- Moon Knight
  - "The Goldfish Problem"
  - "Summon the Suit"
  - "The Friendly Type"
  - "The Tomb"
  - "Asylum"
  - "Gods and Monsters"
- The Witcher
- Shadow and Bone

=== Film ===
- Blade Runner 2049 (2017)
- Dune (2021)
- Poor Things (2023)
- Alien: Romulus (2024)
- Dune: Part Two (2024)
- Dune: Part Three (2026)

=== Music videos ===
- God of Music (2023)
- Standing Next To You (2023)
- 3D (2023)
