= Loic Mabanza =

French dancer, actor, filmmaker and model

- Born: 1 March 1990 (age 36)
- Occupations: Actor, Filmmaker, Writer, Dancer, Choreographer, Model
- Years active: 2004–present
- Height: 1.85 m (6 ft 1 in)
- Website: undergroundjustice.com

Loic Mabanza (born March 1, 1990) is a French actor, dancer, filmmaker, writer, choreographer and model. He has performed with music artists such as Chris Brown, Usher, Mariah Carey, Kendrick Lamar, Cher and Jennifer Hudson, and co-starred alongside Lupita Nyong'o in Jay Z's music video "MaNyfaCedGod". He was selected by the creative director Jamie King and the choreographers Richmond and Anthony Talauega to be one of Michael Jackson's dancers for his posthumous album "Xscape". Mabanza is also known as one of Madonna's main dancers. In 2022, Mabanza played Bek in the Disney+ miniseries Moon Knight.

== Early life ==
Mabanza grew up in Persan, a small town located in the north of Paris, where he discovered his love for dancing at the age of seven, a passion that he shared with playing football. Due to an injury, Mabanza ended his run as a football player at the age of 13, which then made him focus solely on his passion for dancing. He is of Congolese descent.

Also known as "Speedylegz", Mabanza was one of the original members of the French street dance group Criminalz Crew, founded in 2004. Over the years, he and Criminalz Crew gained popularity in the street dance community by winning numerous French and international competitions.

== Dancing career ==
In 2007, Mabanza started his professional dance career working with French artists such as La fouine, Magic system, Sheryfa Luna and Les Déesses. In parallel, Mabanza taught hip-hop dance classes in studios around Paris and dance workshops all around Europe and Canada. Later on, he became a judge for international dance competitions and conventions such as "Dance World Cup", IDance Convention and "5.6.7.8 Showtime".

In 2011, Mabanza partnered with Samsung and starred in a series of advertising campaigns for their new 7 Series notebook PC Slate.

That same year, Mabanza and the hip-hop dancer Diablo (Also known as the duo “Speedylegz and Diablo”) landed 2nd place in the first season of the TV show La Meilleure Danse.

In 2012, Mabanza booked his first world tour with Madonna, The MDNA tour. He appeared in her music video "Turn Up the Radio" directed by Tom Munro and performed on The Ellen DeGeneres Show.

In 2013, Mabanza left Criminalz Crew and moved to the United States traveling between New York and Los Angeles to further pursue his career.

He choreographed and performed for Martin Solveig during Electric Zoo 2013 in Randall's Island. Mabanza also performed with Chris Brown and Nicki Minaj at the BET Awards 2013 and later that year danced for Chris brown again at Powerhouse 106 in Philadelphia. Mabanza appeared in Fergie's music video "A Little Party Never Killed Nobody" directed by Fatima Robinson.

In 2014, Mabanza performed with Usher for the world premiere of Michael Jackson’s single “Love Never Felt So Good” at the iHeartRadio Music Awards and danced in the music video featuring Justin Timberlake. Mabanza was also part of Michael Jackson World Premiere Experience "Slave to the Rhythm" at the 2014 Billboard music awards.

Mabanza appeared in Jane Zhang's music video "Forever", directed by Muh Chen and performed alongside Zhang for her album "The seventh Sense" release party in Beijing.

Mabanza also performed with OneRepublic on the television show The Voice on NBC and later that year with Jennifer Hudson on the television show Dick Clark's New Year's Rockin' Eve.

In 2015, Mabanza danced in Madonna's music videos "Living For Love", directed by J.A.C.K and "Bitch I'm Madonna" directed by Jonas Akerlund. He also performed with her at the 57th annual Grammy awards, The Brit Awards and in television shows such as The Tonight Show starring Jimmy Fallon, The Ellen DeGeneres Show, Le grand Journal and the Jonathan Ross Show before embarking on The Rebel Heart Tour.

In 2016, Mabanza performed with Mariah Carey on her annual "All I want for Christmas is you" residency concert at the Beacon theater and later on Dick Clark's New Year's Rockin' Eve on ABC.

In 2017, Mabanza starred in the music video "Come Closer" by Wizkid featuring Drake directed by Alan Ferguson and in the music video "Falling" by Alesso directed by Henrik Hanson.

In 2018, Mabanza performed with Kendrick Lamar during the opening the 60th Annual Grammy Awards featuring U2 and Dave Chappelle. He also performed with Martin Solveig at L'Olympia in Paris and was the choreographer for Kat Deluna's music video "Nueva Actitud" directed by Lanz Pierce.

In 2019, Mabanza joined forces with Madonna once again to perform at the 64th Eurovision Song Contest in Tel Aviv and later that year went on The Madame X Tour

In 2023, Mabanza performed with Cher during the annual IHeartRadio Jingle Ball concert at the Madison Square Garden.

In 2024, Mabanza joined forces with Cher once again for a performance at the 30th edition of the amfAR gala in Cannes.

In 2025, Mabanza joined forces with Usher for a surprise performance directed by Baz Luhrmann at the 2025 Met Gala at the Metropolitan Museum of Art.

In 2026, Mabanza performed with Madonna at the historic first-ever FIFA World Cup Final Halftime Show at Metlife Stadium in New York.

In addition, Mabanza is also a movement director who choreographed for the True Religion campaign starring Joan Smalls directed by Steven Klein, for Fergie's music video "Enchanté" starring Kendall Jenner directed by Bruno Ilogti, V Magazine "Holiday Video" starring Chanel Iman directed by Justin Wu and for Mission Magazine 10th anniversary edition starring Yasmin Wijnaldum and Chiharu Okunugi captured by Max Papendieck.

== Modeling career ==
Mabanza has been featured in various television, web and print advertising campaigns including Louis Vuitton, Givenchy, Ralph Lauren, Levi’s, Carolina Herrera, Swarovski, Diesel,Timberland, Kenneth Cole, Theory, John John denim, Geox, Toyota, IBM, Samsung, Cabi online, MDNA Skin and Sixpad

Mabanza has appeared in editorial for Vogue Germany, Vogue Arabia, W Magazine, V Magazine, GQ, Harper’s Bazaar Brazil, Men's Health, Geoir magazine, Wad Magazine, Spirit and Flesh, Wonderland Magazine, Mission Magazine and has been on the cover for several magazines such has Modern Luxury, DC, Atlantan, Crush Fanzine and Geox Magazine.

Mabanza walked and performed in several fashion shows, including Ralph Lauren, En Noir,Ami Paris, Calvin Luo and Cavalera

In addition, Mabanza and Lil Buck performed for Valentino at a dinner hosted by Giancarlo Giammetti in honor of the designer's new book, Valentino: At the Emperor's Table.

in 2018, Mabanza was paired with the Brazilian model Isabeli Fontana in a live performance exhibition orchestrated and captured by Marcos Mello during Art Basel in Miami Beach.

In 2022, Mabanza partnered with Equinox and starred in their global ad campaign entitled "Life is the Luxury".

== Acting and filmmaking career ==
Mabanza started his acting journey in 2008 in a small theater company in Saint-Brice-sous-Forêt playing in a modern adaptation of William Shakespeare's play Othello.

He directed his first short film in 2012 while being on The MDNA tour. Later that year, Mabanza acted in the short film Secretprojectrevolution, co-directed by Madonna and Steven Klein.

A year later, Mabanza studied acting with Susan Batson in New York. He then produced and starred in the short films Extraction and Kinesis, both directed by Venkay films.

In 2016, Mabanza wrote, produced and starred in Myles Raven, a short film that he co-directed with Roodmy Poulard.

In 2017, Mabanza co-starred alongside Lupita Nyong'o in the short film directed by Francesco Carrozini and produced by Jay-Z. Mabanza also directed and produced the music video "T.A.K." by Patrick Toussaint.

In 2018, Mabanza landed a role in The Kitchen, a feature film directed by Andrea Berloff, starring Melissa McCarthy, Tiffany Haddish and Elisabeth Moss.

In 2022, Mabanza appeared in the Disney+ miniseries Moon Knight, playing Bek, the bodyguard and henchman of Anton Mogart, portrayed by Gaspard Ulliel in the episodes "The Friendly Type" and "The Tomb".

In 2023, Mabanza portrayed the role of Ian in the television series And Just Like That....

In 2026, Mabanza played the role of François Henry in The Fall And Rise Of Reggie Dickins.

Mabanza is the founder and CEO of Underground Justice Studios, a transmedia production company.

== Other ventures ==
In 2017, Mabanza partnered with Kenneth Cole and Raising Malawi, a charity non-profit organization to create a program that will help and inspire kids from orphanages to turn their lives around by finding their purposes in life.

Mabanza is also a mixed martial arts practitioner and fitness enthusiast.

== Music videos ==
- Michael Jackson feat Justin Timberlake- "Love Never Felt So Good"
- Madonna- "Bitch I’m Madonna"
- Madonna- “2Living For Love"
- Madonna- "Turn Up The Radio"
- Jay-Z "MaNyfaCedGod"
- Wizkid feat Drake- "Come Closer"
- Fergie- "A little Party Never Killed Nobody"
- Alesso- "Falling"
