= Aaru =

Paradise in ancient Egyptian mythology

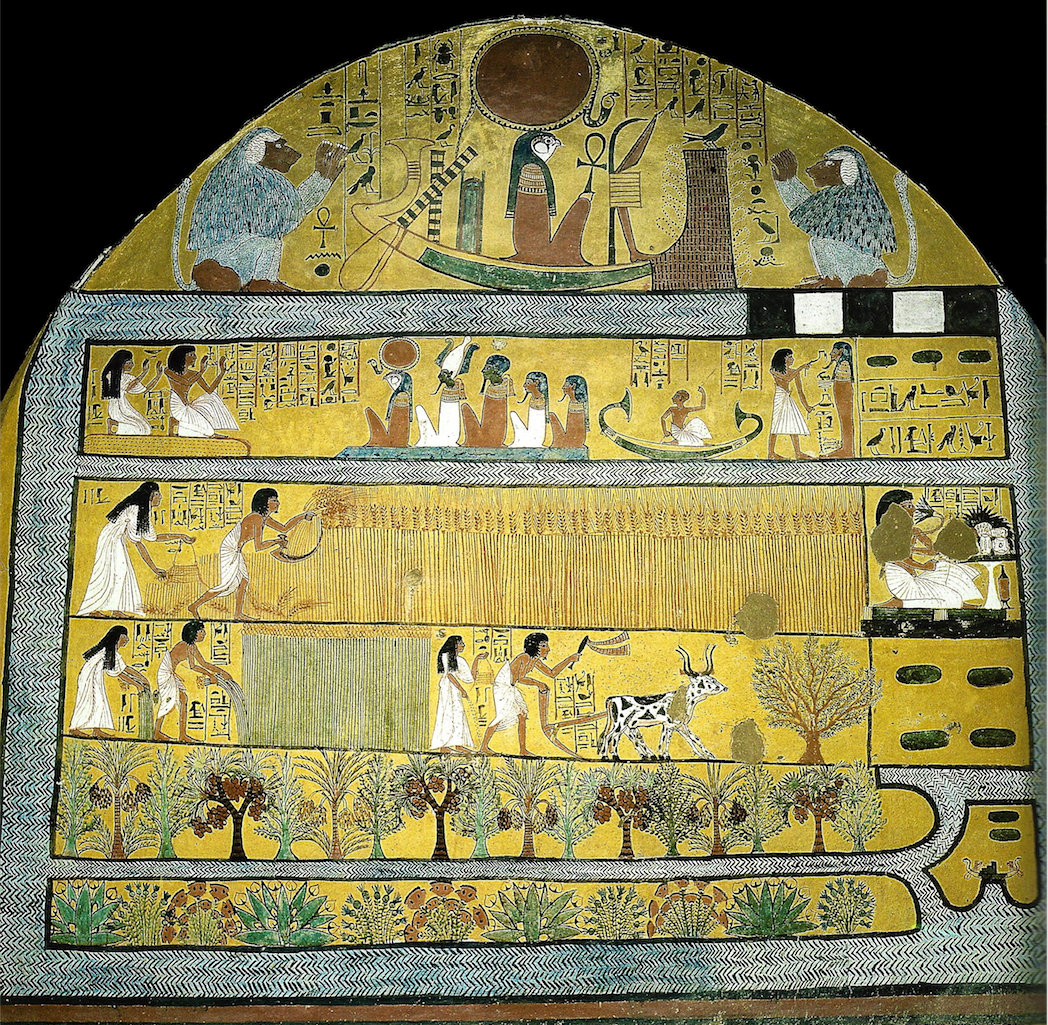
Depiction of Aaru within a work of ancient Egyptian art, from Dayr al-Madīnah

Aaru (/ɑːˈruː/; Ancient Egyptian: jꜣrw, lit. 'reeds'), or the Field of Reeds (sḫt-jꜣrw, sekhet-aaru), is the name for heavenly paradise in Egyptian mythology. Ruled over by Osiris, an Egyptian god, the location has been described as the ka of the Nile Delta.

Ancient Egyptians believed that the soul resided in the heart, and that each individual would therefore undergo a "Weighing of the Heart" in the afterlife; each human heart is weighed on a giant scale against an ostrich feather, which represents the concept of the goddess Maat. All souls that successfully balance the scales will be allowed to start a long and perilous journey to Aaru, where they will exist in peace and pleasure for eternity. Conversely, hearts that are heavy with evil will tumble from the scale pan and fall into the crocodilian jaws of the goddess Ammit. Any souls that are subject to Ammit's "second death" are doomed to restlessness in the Duat.

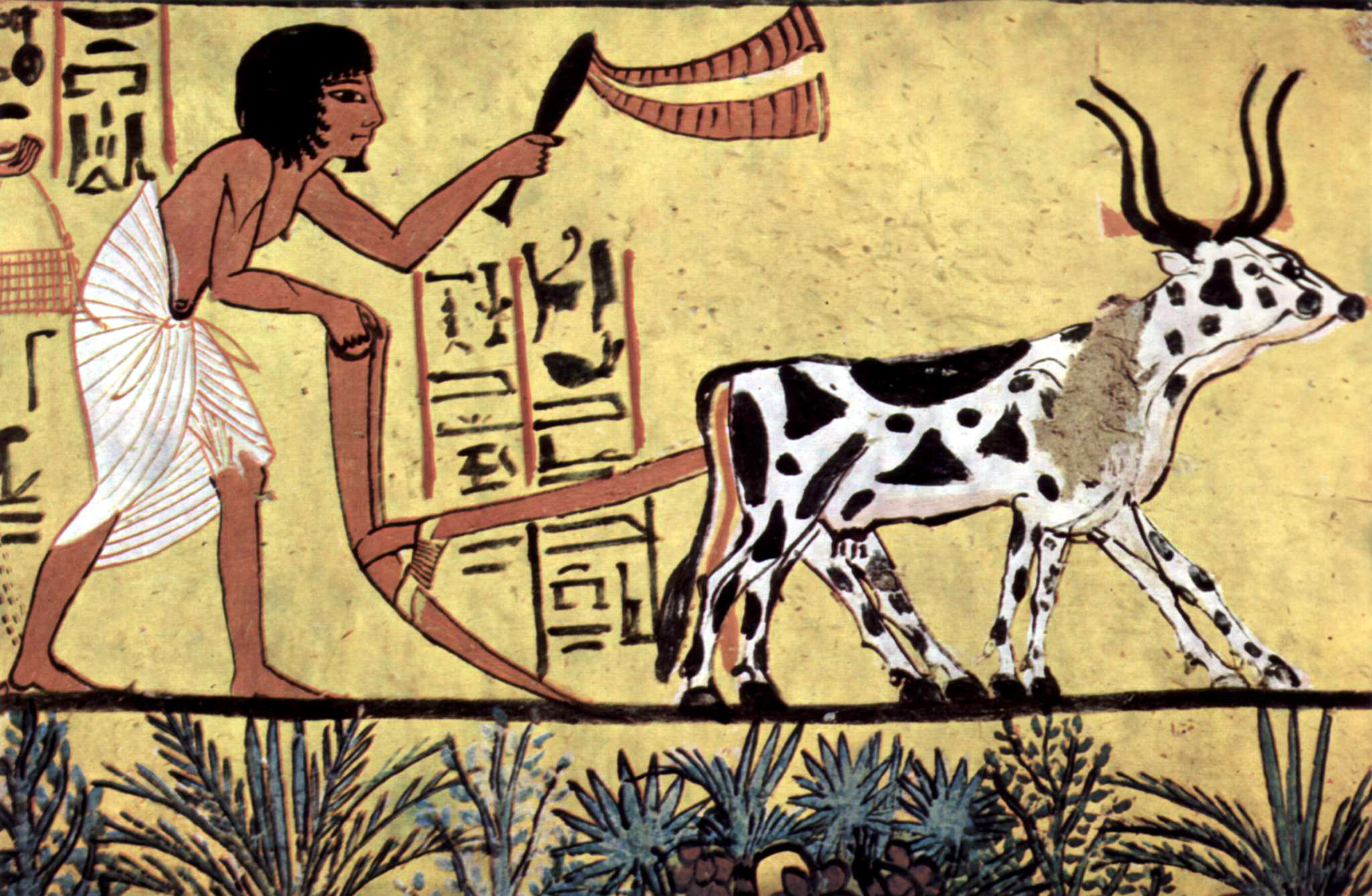
Sennedjem plows his fields with a pair of oxen, used as beasts of burden and a source of food, a depiction of Aaru from Dayr al-Madīnah.

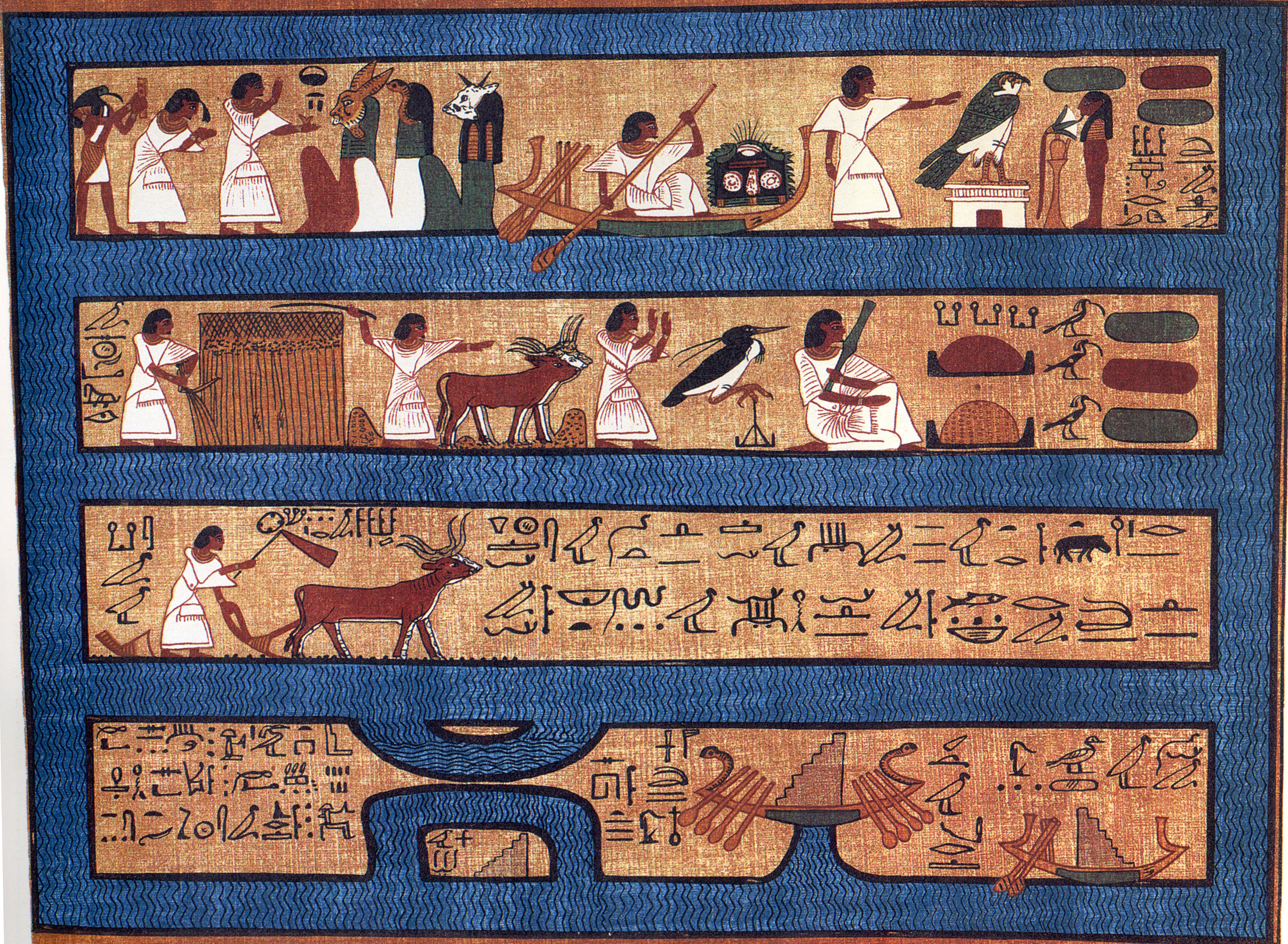
Depiction of the "Field of Reeds" within the Papyrus of Ani, currently at the British Museum

Qualifying souls undergo a long journey and face many perils before finally reaching Aaru. Once they arrive, they enter through a series of gates—the exact number of gates varies across sources, with given figures alternating between 15 gates and 21 gates. They are uniformly described as being guarded by deities and evil demons, and if the deceased passed through these final gates, they would be rowed across the water to the shores of the Field of Reeds.

Aaru was usually placed in the east, where the Sun rises, and has been described as comprising boundless reed fields, like those of the Nile Delta. Consequently, this ideal hunting and farming ground enabled qualified souls to live for eternity; more precisely, Aaru was envisaged as a series of islands covered in fields of reeds. The part where Osiris later dwelt is sometimes known as the "field of offerings" (sḫt-ḥtpt).

== Resident deities ==
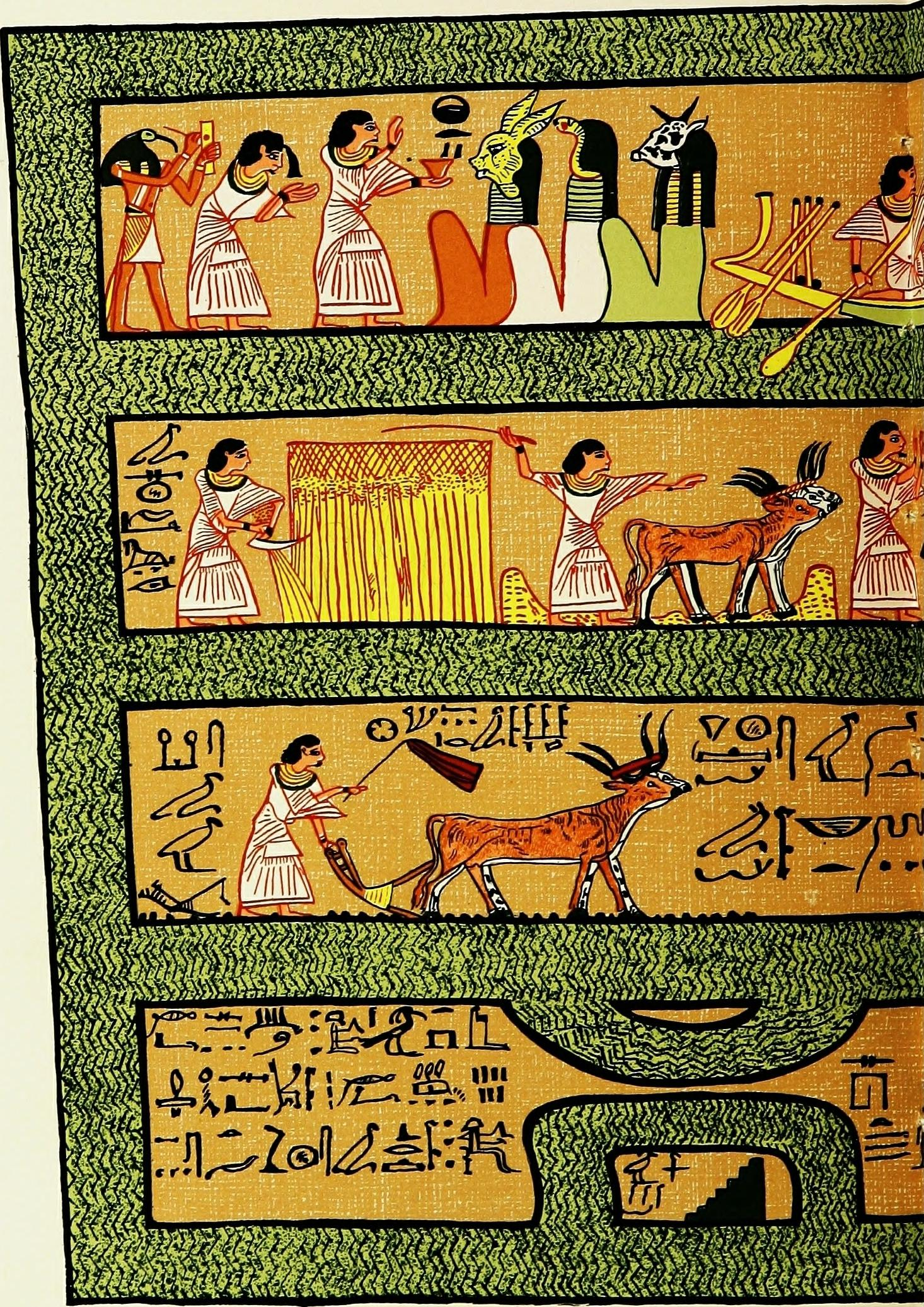
Ani making an offering before hare, snake and bull headed deities. Behind him stand his wife Thuthu.

Aaru was also a residence for various deities worshiped by the deceased. Therefore, the deceased live eternally in the presence and amongst the gods, ruled over by the resident god, Osiris. As a result, the deceased ate and drank the same delicacies devoured by their gods.

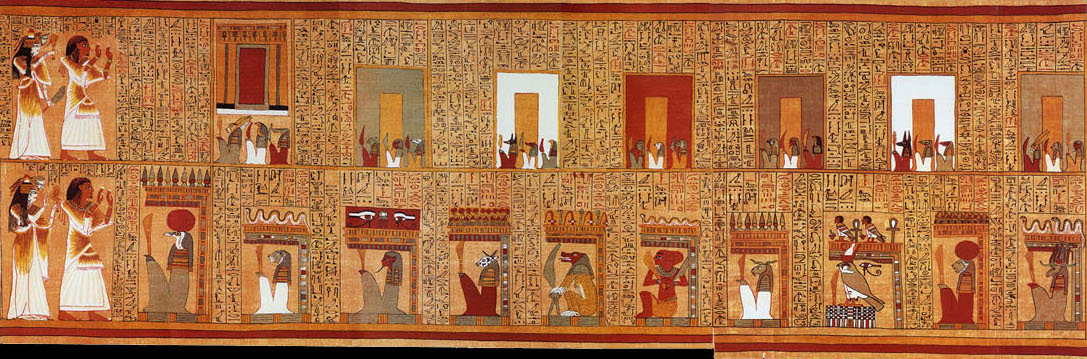
Two 'gate spells'. On the top register, Ani and his wife face the 'seven gates of the House of Osiris'. Below, they encounter ten of the 21 'mysterious portals of the House of Osiris in the Field of Reeds'. All are guarded by unpleasant protectors.

=== Deities of the Twenty-One Secret Portals Of The Mansion Of Osiris In The Field Of Reeds ===
Portal	Name of Portal as Goddess	Guardian God
1	"Mistress Of Trembling"	"Dreadful"
2	"Mistress Of The Sky"	"Born Of The Hindquarters"
3	"Mistress Of The Altar"	"Cleanser"
4	"Powerful Of Knives"	"Long-Horned Bull"
5	"Fiery One"	"Killer Of Opponents"
6	"Mistress Of Darkness"	"Destroyer"
7	"Veiler Of The Weary One (Osiris)"	"Ikenti"
8	"Lighter Of Flames – Extinguisher Of Heat"	"Protector Of His Body"
9	"Foremost"	"Fowler"
10	"Piercing Of Voice" or "High Of Double Doors"	"Great Embracer"
11	"Ceaseless In Knifing – Scorcher Of Rebels"	"Cook Of His Braziers"
12	"Invoked By Her Two Lands"	"Cat"
13	"She Above Whom Osiris (or: Isis, Ennead) Stretches His Arms"	"Destroyer Of The Robber"
14	"Mistress Of Anger – Dancing On Blood"	"Screecher"
15	"Great Of Valour"	"Vigilant Of Face"
16	"Dread"	"Clever In Bowing"
17	"Great On The Horizon"	"Spirit"
18	"Lover Of Heat"	"Anointed"
19	"She Who Foretells Mornings Throughout Her Lifespan – Possessor Of The Writings of Thoth"	nameless
20	"Dweller Within the Cavern Of Her Lord"	nameless
21	"Sharpener Of Flint To Speak For Her"	"Giraffe" ("Memy")

== In popular culture ==
- Aaru makes an appearance in the episode "Asylum" of the Disney+ series Moon Knight (2022) where Taweret weighs the hearts of Marc Spector and his alter Steven Grant on the Scales of Justice to determine if they would be allowed to enter the Field of Reeds, which Marc manages to reach.
- In Assassin's Creed Origins, Aaru is a heavenly aspect of the game.

== See also ==
- Ancient Egyptian afterlife beliefs
- Ashihara no Nakatsukuni, heavenly afterlife location in Japanese mythology
- Elysium, heavenly afterlife location in Greek mythology
- Valhalla and Fólkvangr, heavenly afterlife locations in Norse mythology
- Nirvana, concept of rebirth liberation in the Indian religions
  - Nirvana (Buddhism)
- Neorxnawang, old Anglo-Saxon term for "heavenly meadow" in the afterlife
