= Khalid Abdalla =

British actor (born 1980)

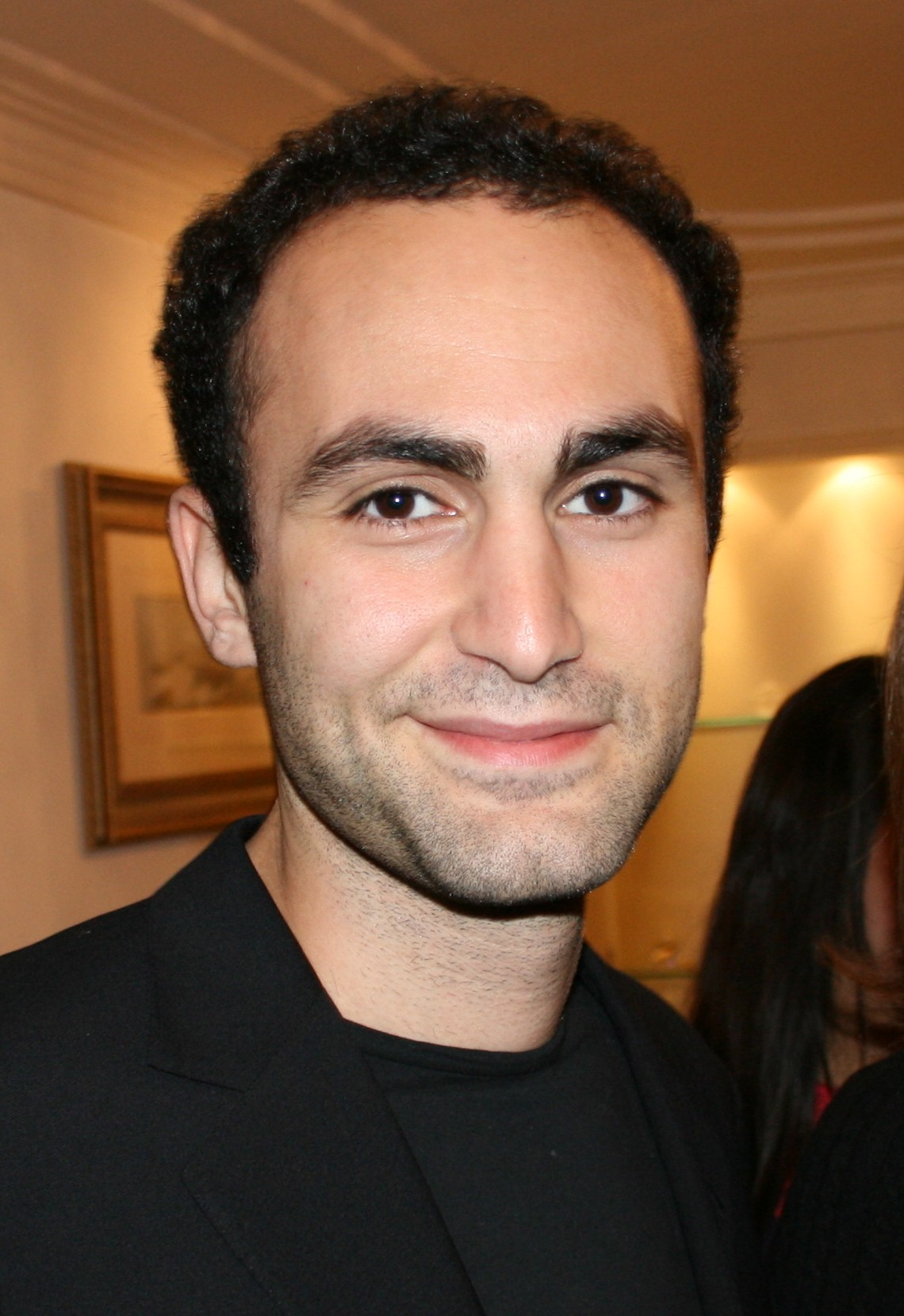
- Born: 26 October 1980 (age 46); Glasgow, Scotland, United Kingdom
- Education: King's College School; Queens' College, Cambridge; École Philippe Gaulier
- Occupations: Actor; activist
- Years active: 1998–present
- Spouse: Cressida Trew (m. 2011)

Khalid Abdalla (Arabic: خالد عبد الله; born 26 October 1980) is a British actor and activist. He became known after starring in the 2006 film United 93.

Abdalla starred as Amir in The Kite Runner (2007) and acted with Matt Damon in Green Zone (2010), his second film with director Paul Greengrass. Abdalla appears as himself in Jehane Noujaim's documentary on the 2011 Egyptian revolution, The Square, which won the Audience Award at Sundance Festival in 2013. In 2022 and 2023, he starred as Dodi Fayed in seasons 5 and 6 of the historical drama series The Crown, for which he received a Critics' Choice Television Award nomination for Best Supporting Actor in a Drama Series.

Abdalla is on the board of the National Student Drama Festival. In 2011, he became one of the founding members of the Mosireen ("We Insist") Collective in Cairo: a group of revolutionary filmmakers and activists dedicated to supporting citizen media across Egypt in the wake of Hosni Mubarak's fall. Three months after it began, Mosireen became the most watched non-profit YouTube channel in Egypt of all time, and in the whole world in January 2012.

== Early life ==
Abdalla was born in Glasgow, Scotland, to Egyptian parents, and was brought up in London. Abdalla's father and grandfather were well-known anti-regime activists in Egypt. His parents were both physicians who immigrated to the UK before he was born.

Abdalla was educated at King's College School, an independent school for boys in Wimbledon in south-west London and his classmates included actor Ben Barnes and comedian Tom Basden. He became interested in acting after becoming involved in his school's thriving drama scene. In 1998, he directed a production of Someone Who'll Watch Over Me by Frank McGuinness, which ended up having a successful run at the Edinburgh Festival and earned five stars in The Scotsman newspaper, making him the youngest director to receive this accolade.

After spending a gap year travelling around the Middle East, Abdalla went on to Queens' College, Cambridge, where he read English. He was active in the student drama scene alongside the likes of contemporaries Rebecca Hall and Dan Stevens. He was a joint winner with Cressida Trew, his future wife, of the Judges' Award for Acting at the National Student Drama Festival for his performance in Bedbound by Enda Walsh. Abdalla trained under Philippe Gaulier at École Philippe Gaulier.

== Career ==
In 2003, Abdalla played the title role in Christopher Marlowe's Tamburlaine the Great at the Rose Theatrein Kingston, London. This was the inaugural production of Peter Hall's Canon's Mouth Theatre Company, composed of "young actors intent on discovering a new voice for the great metaphorical dramas of the Renaissance".

Abdalla's first screen role was in a 2005 episode of Spooks entitled Infiltration of a New Threat.

In 2006, Abdalla made his Hollywood debut in United 93, a film about the 11 September attacks, and garnered critical acclaim for his portrayal of Ziad Jarrah. He was cast in the lead role of the film The Kite Runner. In preparation for that role, he spent time in Kabul learning Dari Persian and kite-flying.

In 2008, Abdalla appeared as Guy Pringle in the BBC Radio 4 adaptation of Fortunes of War. He starred as Freddy in Green Zone with Matt Damon and director Paul Greengrass.

In 2009–10, Abdalla produced and acted in the independent Egyptian film In the Last Days of the City, directed by Tamer El Said.

In November 2010, Abdalla was awarded special recognition for achievements in cinema at the Cairo International Film Festival.

In 2011, he narrated the documentary film East to West, also known as The River Flows Westward.

In 2016, he appeared as Muhammad XI of Granada in the film Assassin's Creed.

In 2022–23, Abdalla played Dodi Fayed, the lover of Diana, Princess of Wales, in the fifth and sixth seasons of The Crown. His performance in the sixth season earned his nomination for a Critics' Choice Television Award for Best Supporting Actor in a Drama Series.

In 2024, Nowhere, a solo play written and performed by Abdalla, premiered at Battersea Arts Centre and was published by Salamander Street.

Also in 2024, Abdalla starred in the 2024 reproduction of Mnemonic (play), taking over from Simon McBurney in the main role. In this production, the main role's name was changed from Simon/Virgil to Khalid/Omar, to reflect the change in cast. It ran from 22 June to 10 August at the Olivier Theatre, within the National Theatre.

== Personal life ==
In January–February 2011, Abdalla was among protesters in Tahrir Square in Cairo, Egypt in the major protests against the Hosni Mubarak regime. He also appeared on The Situation Room with Wolf Blitzer show on CNN on 9 February 2011 and Anderson Cooper to reflect his views on the protest. He continues to be active in Egypt.

In 2011 Abdalla became one of the founding members of the Mosireen Collective in Cairo: a group of revolutionary filmmakers and activists dedicated to supporting citizen media across Egypt in the wake of Mubarak's fall. Mosireen films the ongoing revolution, publishes videos that challenge state media narratives, provides training sessions and equipment and screenings and holds an extensive library of footage. At three months old, Mosireen became the most watched non-profit YouTube channel in Egypt of all time, and in the whole world in January 2012.

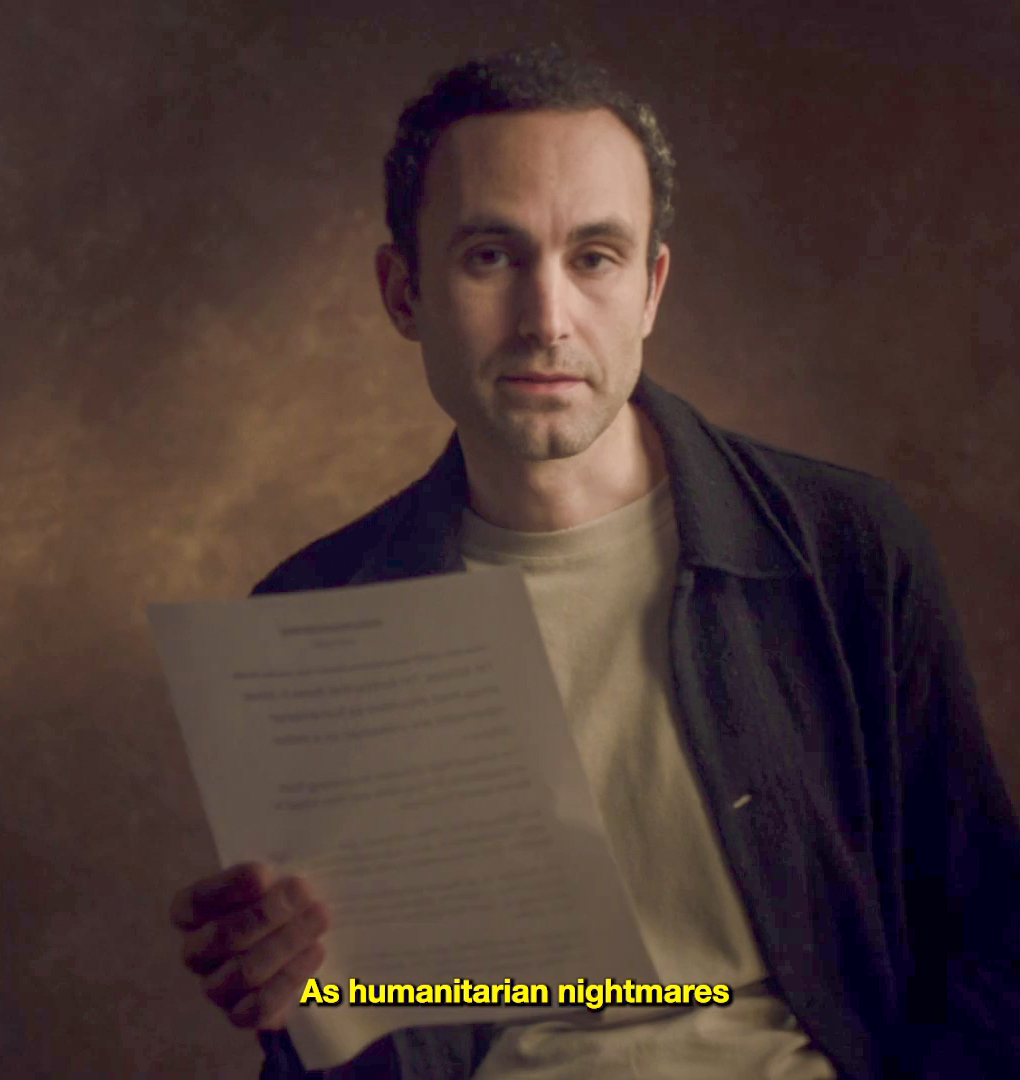
Abdalla participating in a plea to end the Gaza genocide in 2024

Abdalla has been an outspoken supporter of Palestinian rights. In March 2025, he was invited to an interview under caution by the Metropolitan Police over his part in a pro-Palestine protest in London in January of that year, following "alleged breaches of Public Order Act conditions." Abdalla said that it was evidence that "the right to protest is under attack in this country."

== Filmography ==
=== Film ===
Year	Title	Role	Notes
2006	United 93	Ziad Jarrah	
2007	Hush Your Mouth	JJ Farouk	
2007	The Kite Runner	Amir Qadiri	
2010	Green Zone	Farid Yusuf "Freddy" Abdurrahman	
2010	Maydoum	Sharif	Short
2012	Predella	Magid	Short
2012	Al Alamayn	Mahmoud	Short
2012	Une arme de choix	Himself	Documentary short
2013	The Square	Himself	Documentary
2014	Tigers	Nadeem	
2014	Narrow Frame of Midnight	Zacaria	
2015	1001 Inventions and the World of Ibn Al-Haytham	Ibn Al-Haytham	Voice
2016	In the Last Days of the City	Khalid El-Said	
2016	Our Kind of Traitor	Luke	
2016	Assassin's Creed	Muhammad XI of Granada	
2017	Birds Like Us	Bat	Voice
2020	Undergods	Octavius	
2026	Prima Facie	Sam Ibrahim KC	

=== Television ===
Year	Title	Role	Notes
2005	Spooks	Yazdi	Episode: "Road Trip"
2007	Secret's Out	Himself	Episode: "The Kite Runner"
2011	East To West	Narrator	Voice, 7 episodes
2019–2020	Hanna	Jerome Sawyer	6 episodes
2022	Moon Knight	Selim / Osiris	3 episodes
2022–2023	The Crown	Dodi Fayed	7 episodes Nominated—Critics' Choice Television Award for Best Supporting Actor in a Drama Series; Nominated—Satellite Award for Best Supporting Actor – Series, Miniseries or Television Film; Nominated—Screen Actors Guild Award for Outstanding Performance by an Ensemble in a Drama Series
2024	The Day of the Jackal	Ulle Dag Charles	
2026	Secret Service	Zak Hussein	
