= Shaun Scott (actor) =

British television actor (born 1954)

- Born: 1954 (age 71–72); Canada
- Spouse: Caroline

Shaun Scott (born 1954) is a British television actor. He was educated at Reed's School, Cobham, Surrey.

He appeared in the popular long-running series of The Bill where he played DI Chris Deakin (he previously played a villain in series 6 episode 92, series 7 episode 34, series 8 episode 83, as well as series 9 episode 13). He also appeared as deputy lock keeper Tom Pike in the 1989 BBC television comedy The River with David Essex. He also played Harchester United manager Patrick Doyle in Sky One's football drama Dream Team and appeared as a villainous regular in the Scottish Gaelic soap opera Machair.

Scott also played Jack Fairchild in the comedy series Brass. He also appeared as a fresh-faced lad of 19 taken in by the Bourne family as handy man after being bound over for stealing a bicycle in the ATV daytime drama "The Cedar Tree" (1976–77). His theatre credits include, Crazy for You, Prince Edward Theatre; Heartbreak House, Haymarket Theatre, dir. Trevor Nunn; The Shaughraun, Royal National Theatre and Translations, National Theatre.

In 2022, he played Bertrand Crawley in the Disney+ series Moon Knight.

== Filmography ==
=== Film ===
Year	Title	Role	Notes
1979	Hanover Street	Male Patient No. 1	
1992	Wild West	Tony	
2009	Jimmy Wilde	The Mayor	
2021	Sardar Udham	Michael O'Dwyer	Bollywood Movie

=== Television ===
Year	Title	Role	Notes
1982	The Agatha Christie Hour	Neil Carslake	Episode 2, "In a Glass Darkly"
1988	The River	Tom Pike	
1991	Casualty	Rob Carrington	Series 6 - Episode 7 "Beggars Can't Be Choosers"
1992	Agatha Christie's Poirot	Norman Gale	Series 4 - Death in the Clouds
1994 - 2000	The Bill	DI Chris Deakin	276 episodes
2002 - 2003	Dream Team	Patrick Doyle	43 episodes
2022	Moon Knight	Bertrand Crawley	Disney+ series
