= Marc Spector (Marvel Cinematic Universe) =

Character in the Marvel Cinematic Universe

- Marvel Cinematic Universe character
- Oscar Isaac as Marc Spector / Moon Knight (right), Steven Grant / Mr. Knight (left), and Jake Lockley (bottom) in Moon Knight
- First appearance: Marc Spector and Steven Grant: "The Goldfish Problem"; Moon Knight (2022); Jake Lockley: "Gods and Monsters"; Moon Knight (2022)
- Based on: Moon Knight by: Doug Moench; Don Perlin
- Adapted by: Jeremy Slater
- Portrayed by: Oscar Isaac; Carlos Sanchez (young); David Jake Rodriguez (teenager)
- Voiced by: Oscar Isaac (What If...? season 3)

In-universe information
- Full name: Marc Spector; Steven Grant; Jake Lockley
- Titles: Moon Knight (Spector); Mr. Knight (Grant)
- Occupation: Khonshu's Moon Knight; United States military soldier (Spector); Mercenary (Spector); Gift shop assistant (Grant); Chauffeur (Lockley)
- Affiliation: United States Military (Spector); British Museum (Grant)
- Weapon: Crescent darts; Truncheons
- Family: Elias Spector (father); Wendy Spector (mother); Randall Spector (brother)
- Spouse: Layla El-Faouly
- Religion: Judaism
- Origin: Chicago, Illinois
- Nationality: American (Spector); British (Grant)
- Home: London, England (Steven)

Marc Spector, Steven Grant, and Jake Lockley are fictional characters portrayed by Oscar Isaac in the Marvel Cinematic Universe (MCU) media franchise, based on the Marvel Comics characters of the same name. Spector is depicted as the vigilante Moon Knight, and the avatar of the Egyptian deity Khonshu.

Spector is an American mercenary who has dissociative identity disorder (DID) which he developed as a result of child abuse. He is also married to Layla El-Faouly. Grant, his alter, operates as a gift shop employee in London. Grant becomes aware of Spector, and takes on the alias Mr. Knight, and the 2 face-off against the Egyptian deity Ammit and her avatar Arthur Harrow. Lockley, his other alter ego, later executed Harrow.

The character first appeared in the Disney+ series Moon Knight (2022). An alternate variant also appeared in the third season of the animated series What If...? (2024).

== Fictional character biography ==
=== Early life ===
Marc Spector was born on March 9, 1987, in Chicago, Illinois, to Elias and Wendy Spector. One day during his childhood, Spector and his younger brother Randall adventured into a cave near their home which unexpectedly flooded due to heavy rainfall, resulting in Randall drowning. Consumed by the loss of Randall, Wendy blamed Marc for Randall's death and became physically and verbally abusive to him as well as becoming an alcoholic. The trauma from Randall's death and his mother's abuse caused Marc to develop dissociative identity disorder (DID), manifesting the alter Steven Grant; Grant is based on a fictional archaeologist from the movie Tomb Buster that he and Randall used to watch together. Grant would remain unaware of his host's abusive childhood, as Spector wanted to ensure he remained happy and safe from the harm he had to endure. A teenaged Spector would eventually leave home despite Elias' attempts to convince him that he would find help for Wendy.

In adulthood, Spector joined the United States military, but was dishonorably discharged for going AWOL after entering a fugue state while on duty. Spector later began working as a mercenary with his former commanding officer, Bushman. During a job with archaeologist Abdallah El-Faouly at a dig site in Egypt, Bushman was overcome with greed and executed all of the accompanying archaeologists, including El-Faouly. Spector attempted to save them, but was shot and left for dead by Bushman. Mortally wounded, Marc dragged himself to a nearby temple erected in honor of the Egyptian God Khonshu and prepared to commit suicide. Khonshu himself would intervene, granting Spector a second chance at life in exchange for becoming his avatar on Earth and carrying out his wish to exact vengeance on criminals. Spector agreed, with Khonshu resuscitating him and bestowing an armored suit and various powers in return, turning him into the vigilante Moon Knight.

As Moon Knight, Spector dutifully served Khonshu and killed many criminals and evil doers under his name. Remorseful over El-Faouly's murder, Spector met his daughter Layla but was unable to tell her the truth of her father's death. Spector and Layla eventually married, with Layla accompanying him during his ventures as Moon Knight. Suspecting that Khonshu was planning to make Layla his next avatar, Spector separated from her to ensure her protection.

Spector survived the cataclysmic events of the Blip incurred by the alien warlord Thanos in early 2018, and had issued a new passport that December. By 2025, at Wendy's shiva, Spector was unable to bring himself to enter his old home to attend, despite his father's urging. Out of grief and trauma, Spector allowed Grant to assume general dominance over his body, who continued to remain unaware of his status as an alter to his host.

=== Stopping Arthur Harrow ===
==== Steven Grant meets his other self ====
Two months later, Grant had relocated to London, England, and began working as a gift shop assistant at the British Museum. However, Grant is still susceptible to "blackouts", during which Spector reassumes control while Grant remains suppressed in his psyche. One night, Grant attempts to keep himself awake, only to accidentally fall into deep slumber and wake up at a village near the Austrian Alps, now possessing an ancient scarab. He is promptly pursued by enemy forces, retreating deeper into the town where he meets religious zealot Arthur Harrow, who demands the scarab from Grant. Grant escapes in a cupcake truck while being pursued by Harrow's enforcers; he is unexpectedly saved by a mysterious, disembodied voice communicating to him. Grant eventually wakes up during the ordeal to find himself back in his flat. Although initially relieved, he soon comes to the realization that two days had passed since he "blacked out" upon noticing several oddities around his residence and being scolded by his mis-scheduled date. Returning home that night from work, he notices a storage facility key and a cell phone hidden in his flat, and calls Layla, who berates him for ignoring her calls over the course of several months. The following day, Grant is confronted by Harrow during his shift, with several witnesses and security personnel at the museum revealing themselves to Steven as Harrow's followers, and that they all serve under the Egyptian demoness Ammit. Later that night, in pursuit of the scarab, Harrow summons a jackal monster to attack Grant at the museum. Grant runs from the monster, but gets cornered in the bathroom. Spector emerges to offer his help to Grant subconsciously, with the initially reluctant Grant obliging, prompting his transformation into Moon Knight, who proceeds to savagely beat the monster to death.

==== Reconnecting with Layla El-Faouly ====
The following day, Grant returns to the museum, only to be sacked following a review of the security footage from the previous night's attack, which does not show the monster or Moon Knight and only Grant "trespassing" after hours. He then heads to a storage facility and uses the key that he found in his flat where he discovers Spector's belongings, including the scarab he escaped with hidden inside a duffel bag. Just then, Spector himself "appears" in a reflection before Grant, revealing himself as Khonshu's Avatar. Frightened, Grant flees the facility after encountering Khonshu, only to be met by Layla El-Faouly, who introduces herself as Spector's wife. The two of them go to Grant's flat where he is apprehended for stealing the scarab by Police Constables Billy and Bobbi, who are secretly followers of Ammit serving as Harrow's disciples. Harrow brings him to their cult's hideout and demands the scarab from Grant, which Layla shows up with. Aggravated, Harrow summons another jackal monster to go after them. Just as it pushes Grant off of the rooftop of the hideout, he summons his own suit, much to Spector's bewilderment. The jackal successfully overpowers Grant, tiring him physically, and causing him to reluctantly converse with and relinquish control to Spector, who dons the Moon Knight armor and kills the beast. However, Khonshu soon berates Spector for losing the scarab to Harrow amidst the encounter, and threatens Spector with the prospect of claiming Layla as his new avatar, before sending him to Egypt.

==== Locating Ammit's tomb ====
In Cairo, Spector attempts to track down a lead to Harrow's current whereabouts to no avail, while he and Grant continue to experience unusual momentary blackout episodes during which a third alter whose existence is unknown to Spector and Grant, Jake Lockley, takes over their body. After losing one of Ammit's worshippers to suicide, Khonshu causes a solar eclipse, intended to call for a council hearing of the Ennead and their respective avatars. Spector is summoned to the Great Pyramid of Giza, where Khonshu projects his accusation of Harrow for attempting to seek out Ammit's tomb and resurrecting the demoness, to which the accused falsely denies when summoned.

Spector and Layla pay a visit to Anton Mogart who is in possession of the sarcophagus of a medjay who knew where Ammit's tomb was. Before they can use the cloth map to locate the tomb, Harrow arrives and destroys the sarcophagus. After a fight with Mogart's people, Spector and Layla make their way into the desert, but are unable to put the map pieces back together. Spector reluctantly lets Grant take over and he quickly reassembles the map of constellations. Khonshu turns the night sky back in time to the night the map was made so that the star locations matched. As a result, Khonshu is imprisoned in an ushabti, causing Spector and Grant to lose their powers.

==== Finding Ammit's ushabti ====
After escaping Harrow's men, Grant and Layla use the map to find the tomb. They grab supplies from Harrow's empty camp and find an alternate way into the tomb after kissing each other, upsetting Spector. They encounter mummified monsters and Grant splits off from Layla as they both try to escape. He comes across a sarcophagus and realizes that it is likely Alexander the Great's after recognizing the Macedonian language. He opens the sarcophagus and reaches down the mummy's throat where he finds Ammit's ushabti. Layla arrives and confronts Spector over what happened to her father. Harrow and his followers arrive and after Spector quickly kills a few of them, Harrow shoots Spector twice in the chest, killing him.

==== The Duat and psychiatric hospital ====
Spector wakes up in a psychiatric hospital, populated by people in his and Grant's lives. Spector then finds himself in an office, where Harrow appears as a psychiatrist seemingly helping him. Spector escapes and finds a room containing two sarcophaguses, one containing Grant in a separate body. Spector and Grant embrace, leave the second sarcophagus–which contains Lockley–and are greeted by a hippopotamus-headed woman, who causes Spector and Grant to scream. After this, Spector begins to switch between two different realities: encountering the woman with Grant, and in the office with "Dr. Harrow".

In the first reality, Grant identifies the woman as goddess Taweret, who explains they are dead and the "psychiatric hospital" is a boat sailing through the Duat, the Egyptian afterlife. Taweret weighs their hearts on the Scales of Justice to determine if they can enter the Field of Reeds, but discovers their hearts are imbalanced by hidden memories in the "hospital" she suggests they explore. Grant discovers Randall's death and Wendy's abusive actions, while Spector shows him a memory of how he became Moon Knight and Khonshu's avatar on a mission with Bushman. Spector and Grant try to convince Taweret to let them return to the living world, and she steers the boat towards the Gates of Osiris. Spector further reluctantly explains to Grant that he unknowingly created him as a result of Wendy's abuse, and they both reconcile with each other. The scales fail to balance, causing hostile spirits to attack the boat and push Grant overboard, freezing him into sand.

In the second reality, Spector appears in "Dr. Harrow"'s office, who tries to get Spector to calm down by saying he did not shoot him and that his mind is "violently vacillating" between the realities. Harrow tells him that he has made a reassuring fantasy that he is a superhero, but is repeatedly told that he is not a doctor. Harrow recaps how Spector said he arrived to the office, specifically that he had an encounter with a talking hippopotamus, asking him if he thinks that is sense or nonsense, which Spector answers him as nonsense. Harrow asks him to continue talking about the little boy that he was talking about before his screaming, but Spector grabs the paperweight from Harrow's desk, telling him he feels great now, and Harrow buzzes in the orderlies to sedate Spector. As a result, he returns to his conversation with Taweret. When Grant tells Spector that if he does not show him the memory that he is hiding, then that will keep their scale unbalanced and everyone who dies, including Layla, would be his fault. Spector begins repeatedly hitting himself in the head, saying that Grant "can not make him", which returns him to Harrow's office. Harrow tells him he is proud of him for being able to relive his traumatic memories, and asks him whether he thinks he created Grant to hide from the awful things he's done or if he thinks Grant created him to punish the world for what his mother did to him. Harrow tells him that the only way to truly know, is to open up to Grant. After Spector confronts Grant about their mom being dead, Grant's denial brings him to Harrow's office. Harrow offers to call his mom for him, but is stopped when Grant accepts his mother's death.

After Grant freezes, the scales become balanced and Spector finds himself in the Field of Reeds. He decides to leave it to pursue Grant, giving a heartfelt speech to him with his heart, and freezes alongside him. The Gates open and Spector and Grant are resurrected with the help of Taweret, while Layla frees Khonshu from his ushabti; Khonshu fights the now-released Ammit.

==== Battle of the Gods ====
Spector and Grant awaken back in their body, which causes Khonshu to sense their return and bond with them again, healing their body and restoring their powers as Moon Knight and Mr. Knight. Layla discovers they can defeat Ammit by binding her to a mortal body. As Harrow, Ammit, and their followers begin judging everyone in Cairo, Spector, Grant, Layla as Scarlet Scarab, and Khonshu arrive to engage them in battle. Spector and Grant work together in fighting Harrow as they seamlessly switch, until they are overpowered by Harrow. Harrow almost kills them, but they experience a sudden blackout and reawaken to see Harrow brutally defeated by a third identity.

Spector and Layla are able to seal Ammit in Harrow's body, imprisoning her, and Khonshu urges Spector to execute Harrow and Ammit. Spector refuses and orders Khonshu to release him and Grant from being his avatar, which he does. The pair find themselves in "Dr. Harrow"'s office, where they reject the vision and choose to continue their new life together and wake up in Grant's apartment in London. Later, a crippled Harrow is delivered to a limousine before being confronted by Khonshu. Khonshu introduces Marc's other identity Jake Lockley, who then shoots Harrow.

== Alternate versions ==
Other versions of Spector are depicted in the alternate realities of the MCU multiverse.

=== Gamma War ===
In an alternate 2024, Spector was recruited by Sam Wilson / Captain America to join him against the Apex Hulk and his gamma spawn army. During the battle of New York, he fought alongside Shang-Chi, Monica Rambeau, Bucky Barnes, Nakia, and the Red Guardian using the Mighty Avenger Protocol. After getting overpowered, he and the others watched as Bruce Banner turned into the Mega-Hulk to defeat the Apex.

== Concept and creation ==
=== Casting and appearances ===
In October 2020, Oscar Isaac was reported to have begun talks for the role of Marc Spector / Moon Knight and Steven Grant / Mr. Knight in the series, and was reported as having been officially cast by January 2021, which Marvel Studios themselves confirmed by May of that year. The Hollywood Reporter commentator Richard Newby spoke on Isaac's potential in the role, remarking that Isaac's recent major acting roles could draw audiences unfamiliar with the character to the series, and that his Latino ethnicity could allow an examination of faith from different perspectives, rather than having the character be depicted as a "Caucasian Jewish man" like in the comics. Following his debut in the series, the character is intended to appear in future MCU films produced by Marvel Studios.

=== Design ===
Oscar Isaac as Moon Knight (L) and Mr. Knight (R). Both the Moon Knight and the Mr. Knight costumes contained Khonshu's symbol, with Moon Knight's design based on the Universe X version of the character from the comics, while Mr. Knight's adapted the similar three-piece suit from the comics.

Moon Knight's costume consists of armor and Ancient Egyptian bandages, with hieroglyphic-like symbols on his cape, which feature Khonshu's oath and are in a repeating pattern on the underlining in a foil-like fabric. The moon crest on his chest, from which he spawns his crescent darts, also contains the oath of Khonshu, while additional hieroglyphs on his pants that state "Rise and live again as my fist of vengeance. My Moon Knight." His mummy bandage design is based on the Universe X version of the character from the comics, and was designed to conjure around Spector, giving it a supernatural quality and helping to differentiate it from similarly forming hero suits in the MCU that use nanotech. Feige suggested taking the bandage design and combining it with the character's more modern design in the comics. She ultimately chose to separate the costume into many layers and not turn it into a molded piece with the piece and texture on top, as she wanted to incorporate symbolism of Khonshu into her design. The Moon Knight suit was created by FBFX in London, and consisted of over 803 different pieces. It was created out of a flexible "Euro jersey" material, and featured 3D printed textures and colors to give it depth and texture.

For Mr. Knight, Kasperlik created a three-piece suit based on his design in the comics, with various homages to Khonshu in the design. She added designed sneakers to modernize the look. The buttons on his waistcoat feature Khonshu's symbols. She also wanted to pick a fabric that would not be flat white, would have a texture, and would not get "blown out" during nighttime filming and look like "a white marshmallow running across the screen", choosing a white-on-white textured fabric with a silver lame in it. The logic behind the designs of the Moon Knight and Mr. Knight suits was inspired by who each identity was, what they love, and their imagination. With Grant "completely away from the superhero world", he summons a costume that resembles a suit as Mr. Knight. Both the Moon Knight and Mr. Knight suits contained Khonshu's symbol.

== Characterization ==
=== Marc Spector / Moon Knight ===
As a child, Marc Spector developed dissociative identity disorder as a result of his mother's physical abuse when his brother accidentally drowned. Spector later joined the Marines and was badly injured as a mercenary, being saved by Khonshu, who granted him his Moon Knight abilities.

=== Steven Grant / Mr. Knight ===
Steven Grant is introduced as a shy person, letting people push him around, working in a museum gift shop, and having good knowledge of Egyptian mythology. He became Spector's alter when they were kids as a result of childhood abuse by their mom, who blamed Spector for the death of his brother. He has a British accent as a result of Spector watching a film about a British archeologist named Steven Grant. As he learns more about who Spector really is, he starts to gain more confidence and becomes willing to fight while wearing his Mr. Knight suit.

=== Jake Lockley ===
Jake Lockley is a chauffeur who assumes the role of Khonshu's avatar instead of the god seemingly relinquishing his relationship with Marc Spector and Steven Grant; Spector and Grant are unaware of Lockley's existence. He is shown to have the most violent tendencies out of any of Marc's alters, as seen when he escorts the rehabilitated Arthur Harrow to his limousine, before proceeding to gleefully execute him, pleasing Khonshu. Lockley is also fluent in Spanish, a language he uses to taunt Harrow before killing him.

Speaking on the decision to fully introduce Lockley at the end of the season, head writer Jeremy Slater remarked he was aware that people familiar with the Moon Knight canon were dedicated to finding the various allusions made to his presence throughout the prior episodes, instead focusing on "everyone else who's totally unfamiliar with the character and the dynamic", while ensuring that the final reveal of the character would work as "satisfying for the newcomers to the Moon Knight story".

Prior to Lockley's full reveal in the sixth episode, his existence was teased through the placement of various easter eggs and allusions in preceding episodes. Namely, Slater cited Spector and Grant's blackouts in Cairo during the events of the third episode "The Friendly Type", as well as the shaking sarcophagus witnessed by Spector and Grant as they attempted to escape the psychiatric ward at the end of the fourth episode, "The Tomb".

=== Weapons and equipment ===
Marc Spector / Moon Knight uses crescent darts that he can take from the chest area of his suit, while Steven Grant / Mr. Knight uses a pair of truncheons.

== Reception ==
Daniel Fienberg of The Hollywood Reporter described Steven as a "stuttering comedian" and Marc as "a professional with panache." Matt Fowler of IGN called Isaac's performance "violent and touching" and also said that "Isaac carries the bulk of Moon Knight with a wonderful portrayal of two minds living in one body", adding "As the story progresses and responses come in, Isaac with excellent masterfully handles every acting challenge, whether it be arguing with reflection, pitting himself against a mad, roaring creature, or navigating the "organization principles" of his own mind".

=== Accolades ===
Year	Work	Award	Category	Result	Ref.
2022	Moon Knight	MTV Movie & TV Awards	Best Hero	Nominated	
2022	Moon Knight	Premios Juventud	Favorite Actor	Nominated	
2022	Moon Knight	Hollywood Critics Association TV Awards	Best Actor in a Streaming Limited or Anthology Series or Movie	Nominated	
2022	Moon Knight	Saturn Awards	Best Actor in a Streaming Series	Won	
2022	Moon Knight	People's Choice Awards	Male TV Star of 2022	Nominated	
2023	Moon Knight	Critics' Choice Super Awards	Best Actor in a Superhero Series	Nominated	

== See also ==
- Characters of the Marvel Cinematic Universe
