= Ann Akinjirin =

British actress

- Other name: Ann Akin
- Education: University of Bedfordshire; Drama Centre London
- Years active: 2006–present

Ann Akinjirin, formerly credited as Ann Akin, is a British actress and theatre maker. Her films include Old Guy (2024) and Dreamers (2025). Her television work includes the BBC series Trigonometry (2019) and the Disney+ series Moon Knight (2022).

== Early life ==
Akinjirin is of Nigerian descent. Akinjirin attended Copthall School. At age 11, she started taking Saturday classes at the Sylvia Young Theatre School. At age 16, Akinjirin went the BRIT School. She graduated with a Bachelor of Arts (BA) from the University of Bedfordshire in 2007 and then trained at the Drama Centre London.

== Career ==
In 2013, Akinjirin founded the theatre company Harts, where she served as artistic director. Her early television appearances include episodes of the BBC soap opera EastEnders, Law & Order: UK and the ITV sitcom The Delivery Man. She was a regular on the 2015 BBC sketch comedy The Javone Prince Show. This was followed by further appearances in the ITV comedy-drama Cold Feet and the Dave series Crackanory.

Akinjirin featured in an installment of the 2017 Channel 4 science fiction anthology Electric Dreams. From 2018, she had a recurring role as DS Vanessa Ekwensi in the BBC One crime drama Strike. She had her first named feature film role as Detective Constable Amy in King of Thieves that year.

In 2019 and 2020, Akinjirin played Dee in the BBC Two miniseries Trigonometry. She appeared in the BBC One miniseries I May Destroy You as Alissa and The Salisbury Poisonings as Davina Moens, and the Peacock adaptation of Brave New World as DJill29. Akinjirin joined the HBO Nordic series Beforeigners for its second season in 2021 as Precious.

This was followed by roles as Bobbi Kennedy in the Disney+ series Moon Knight in 2022 and Aunt Fanny in the 2023 CBBC adaptation of The Famous Five. She then starred in Simon West's 2024 action comedy Old Guy as Opal and Joy Gharoro-Akpojotor's 2025 drama film Dreamers as Farah opposite Ronkẹ Adékọluẹ́jọ́. Also in 2025, she played Barbara Pierre-Dupont in the Doctor Who spin-off The War Between the Land and the Sea.

== Bibliography ==
=== Plays ===
- Conversations with Love
- Normal?

== Filmography ==
=== Film ===
Year	Title	Role	Notes
2014	Normal?		Short film; also director, writer
2014	Down Dog	Teacher	
2018	King of Thieves	Detective Constable Amy	
2018	All the Devil's Men	Security Engineer	
2019	The Phone Call	Ciara	Short film
2021	For Love	Martha	Short film
2024	Old Guy	Opal	
2025	Dreamers	Farah	

=== Television ===
Year	Title	Role	Notes
2006–2014	EastEnders	Nurse Sarah Michael	3 episodes
2013	Law & Order: UK	Cecile Bakama	Episode: "Mortal"
2014	Give Out Girls	Amy's Friend	Episode: "Hot Boy"
2015	Valentine's Kiss	Stage Manager	1 episode
2015	The Delivery Man	Mrs Akua	Episode: "Foundling"
2015	Humans	Police Woman	1 episode
2015	The Javone Prince Show	Various	4 episodes
2015	You, Me and the Apocalypse	Bank Customer	Episode: "Home Sweet Home"
2015	Unforgotten	Nurse	1 episode
2016	Cold Feet	DI Brunswick	1 episode
2016	Citizen Khan	Police Officer	Episode: "Cricket"
2017	Crackanory	Lauren	Episode: "Living with a Lie"
2017	Electric Dreams	Dr Simpson	Anthology: "The Commuter"
2018–2020	Strike	Vanessa Ekwensi	4 episodes
2019	The Rook	Margaret Akinola	1 episode
2019	Trigonometry	Dee	Miniseries
2020	I May Destroy You	Alissa	2 episodes
2020	The Salisbury Poisonings	Davina Moens	2 episodes
2020	Brave New World	DJill29	4 episodes
2021–2022	Beforeigners	Precious	4 episodes
2022	Moon Knight	Bobbi Kennedy	5 episodes
2023–2025	The Famous Five	Aunt Fanny	5 episodes
2025	The War Between the Land and the Sea	Barbara Pierre-DuPont	5 episodes

=== Video games ===
- House Hack (2021) as DJ Robbie
