= Grant Curtis =

American film producer

- Born: Warrensburg, Missouri, U.S.
- Education: University of Central Missouri (Master's degree, 1997)
- Occupations: Film producer, writer, actor
- Years active: 1997–present

Grant Curtis is a film producer, who has worked with director Sam Raimi on The Gift, Drag Me to Hell, the 2002 Spider-Man film series films and Oz the Great and Powerful.

== Early life and education ==
Curtis grew up in the town of Warrensburg, Missouri. He received a master's degree in Mass Communication in 1997 from the University of Central Missouri (UCM), formerly CMSU. He wrote a thesis and screenplay entitled: "And God Stepped Aside". The screenplay examines the relationship between a young man who reluctantly fulfills the dying wishes of his estranged grandmother by taking her to Paris, France. The story was inspired by Curtis' own personal experiences with death within his family.

== Career ==
Shortly after Curtis completed his thesis and screenplay, while he lived in Los Angeles, CA., his neighbor informed him that director Sam Raimi was looking for an assistant. Curtis interviewed for the position, not entirely confident afterwards that his western Missouri accent and demeanor, not to mention his limited practical experience, garnered Raimi's consideration. After waiting many months, Curtis discovered that he got the job, and his journey towards success began.

In 2002, Curtis received the University of Central Missouri's Alumnus Associations Outstanding Recent Alumni Award.

Aside from producing films, Curtis wrote a book in 2007 called The Spider-Man Chronicles: The Art & Making of Spider-Man 3.

Curtis served as an executive producer on the 2022 streaming series Moon Knight.

He and Nick Pepin also co-produced the film The Fantastic Four: First Steps, released on July 25, 2025.
