= Mohamed Diab =

Egyptian screenwriter and director (born 1978)

- محمد دياب
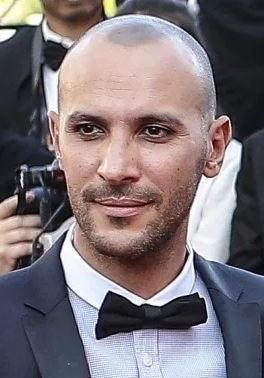
- Born: 1978 (age 47–48); Ismailia, Egypt
- Education: New York Film Academy
- Occupations: Screenwriter, director
- Notable work: Moon Knight

Mohamed Diab (Arabic: محمد دياب, pronounced [mæˈħæmmæd deˈjæːb]; born 1978) is an Egyptian screenwriter and director whose work often centers on pressing issues concerning Egyptian society. He is known for his directorial debut film Cairo 678, which was released a month before the Egyptian revolution, and for directing Disney's Marvel series Moon Knight.

== Career ==
=== Cairo 678 ===
Cairo 678 is Diab's directorial debut. The film follows the intertwining stories of a vigilante trio of women who take on the sexual harassment epidemic in Cairo. The film was released in December 2010 and is considered the most award-winning contemporary Egyptian film. The film was distributed internationally and fared well notably in France, where it sold 265,000 tickets and received ÉcranTotal's "coup de foudre du public" audience recognition award.

=== Eshtebak (Clash) ===
Eshtebak (Clash) was supposed to be a film about the rise of the Egyptian revolution but eventually became a film that captures the fall of the revolution. The entire film is shot from within the confines of a police riot truck. The film is a recipient of grants and funding from the San Francisco Film Society, CNC l'aide au Cinémas du Monde and ARTE France. The film was an official selection for the 2016 Cannes Film Festival, Un Certain Regard category.

=== Moon Knight ===
In October 2020 Diab was hired to direct episodes of Disney+ streaming series Moon Knight, set in the Marvel Cinematic Universe. Diab insisted on bringing Egyptian authenticity to the film's settings even though he was unable to film there. Attention to the smallest details was important to him, such as adding purple hues and the vibrant atmosphere of the Nile River at night. Together with his wife, Sarah Goher, they selected Egyptian music genre songs such as Bahlam Maak, El Melouk, and Batwanes Beek, which are all composed by Egyptian songwriters to convey the true vibe of the country.

== Filmography ==
=== Feature films ===
Year	Title	Original Title	Notes
2010	Cairo 678	678	
2016	Clash	اشتباك	
2021	Amira	أميرة	
2026	Lion	Asad	Post-production

==== Only writer ====
Year	Title	Notes
2007	Real Dreams	
2007	The Island	
2009	The Replacement	
2009	Congratulations	
2010	Décor	
2014	The Island 2	

=== Television ===
Year	Title	Notes
2022	Moon Knight	Director (4 episodes); Executive producer (6 episodes); Role: Ammit's Follower (Uncredited cameo)

== Awards ==
=== Cairo 678 (Les Femmes du Bus 678) ===
Festival	Awards
Chicago International Film Festival	Silver Hugo Best Film Silver Hugo Best Actor
Dubai International Film Festival	Best Actor Best Actress
Asia Pacific Screen Awards	Jury Grand Prize High Commendation
Sydney Film Festival	Special Mention
Montpellier Mediterranean Film Festival	Prix Du Public Prix Jeune Public
Taormina Film Festival	Youth Choice Award
Heartland Film Festival	Grand Prize
Khouribga African Film Festival	Best Film Best Supporting Actress
Third Eye Asian Film Festival	Best Film
Mediterranean Film Festival	Best Film
Salé Women's Film Festival	Special Mention
African Film Festival of Cordoba	Audience Choice Award
Cologne African Film Festival	Audience Choice Award
Egyptian Oscars	Best New Director
Egyptian Catholic Center for Cinema Festival	Jury Prize
Arabian Sights Film Festival	Audience Choice Award

In 2011, Christiane Amanpour presented Mohamed Diab with a Webby Award.
