= Outline of the Marvel Cinematic Universe =

Marvel Cinematic Universe
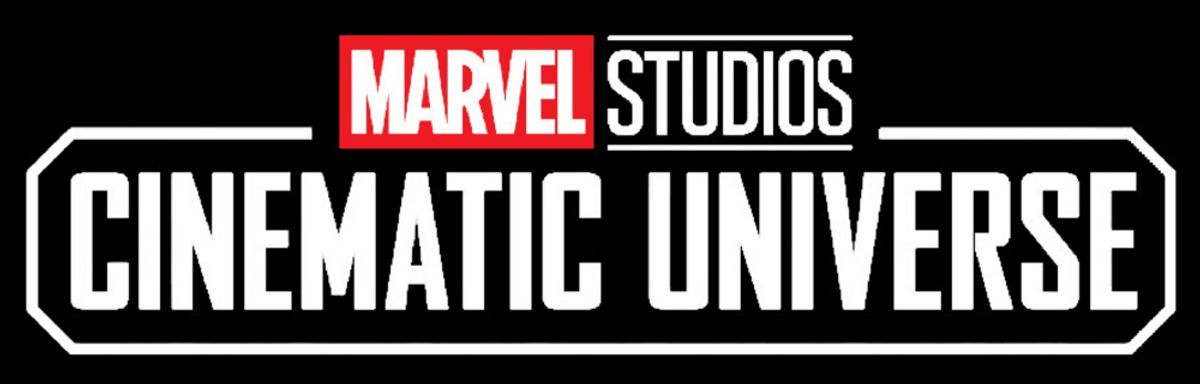
- Official logo as of 2019
- Created by: Marvel Studios
- Original work: Iron Man (2008)
- Owner: The Walt Disney Company
- Years: 2008–present
- Based on: Marvel Comics

Print publications
- Book: Marvel Cinematic Universe books
- Novel: Marvel Cinematic Universe literary material
- Comics: Marvel Cinematic Universe tie-in comics

Films and television
- Film: Marvel Cinematic Universe films
- Short film: Marvel One-Shots
- Television series: Marvel Television series; Marvel Studios series
- Web series: Marvel Cinematic Universe digital series
- Animated series: Marvel Studios Animation series
- Television special: Marvel's Special Presentations
- Television short: I Am Groot

Theatrical presentations
- Musical: Rogers: The Musical

Games
- Video game: Marvel Cinematic Universe video game tie-ins

Audio
- Original music: Music of the Marvel Cinematic Universe

Miscellaneous
- Theme park attraction: Avengers Campus
- Starring: Marvel Cinematic Universe cast members
- In-universe elements: Characters; Features; Species and races; Teams and organizations; Timeline; Multiverse

Official website
- Movies on Marvel.com; TV shows on Marvel.com

Marvel Cinematic Universe Phases
- The Infinity Saga; Phase One (2008–2012); Phase Two (2013–2015); Phase Three (2016–2019)
- The Multiverse Saga; Phase Four (2021–2022); Phase Five (2023–2025); Phase Six (2025–2027)

The following outline serves as an overview of and topical guide to the Marvel Cinematic Universe (MCU), an American media franchise and shared universe created by Marvel Studios and owned by the Walt Disney Company. The franchise began in 2008 with the release of the film Iron Man and has since expanded to include various superhero films and television series produced by Marvel Studios, television series from Marvel Television, short films, digital series, literature, and other media. These are based on characters appearing in American comic books published by Marvel Comics. Marvel Studios president Kevin Feige produces every film and series from that studio for the MCU. The shared universe, much like the original Marvel Universe in comic books, was established by crossing over common plot elements, settings, cast, and characters.

The franchise has been commercially successful and has grossed over $30 billion at the global box office, becoming one of the highest-grossing media franchises and the highest-grossing film franchise of all time. This includes Avengers: Endgame (2019), which concluded its theatrical run as the highest-grossing film of all time. The franchise has received numerous accolades for its films and television series. It has inspired other film and television studios to attempt similar shared universes, and also spawned the creation of several themed attractions, documentary series, literary material, and multiple tie-in video games.

== Organizations ==
- Marvel Studios – Creator of the MCU and the production company for its films, television series, and other media; currently part of Walt Disney Studios; the studio's television series have been released under the "Marvel Television" label since late 2024
  - Marvel Studios Animation – Division of Marvel Studios focused on producing animated television series, which have been released under the division's "Marvel Animation" label since 2024
- Marvel Television – Production company for some television series from 2013 to 2020 that was folded into Marvel Studios in 2019

== Influential people ==
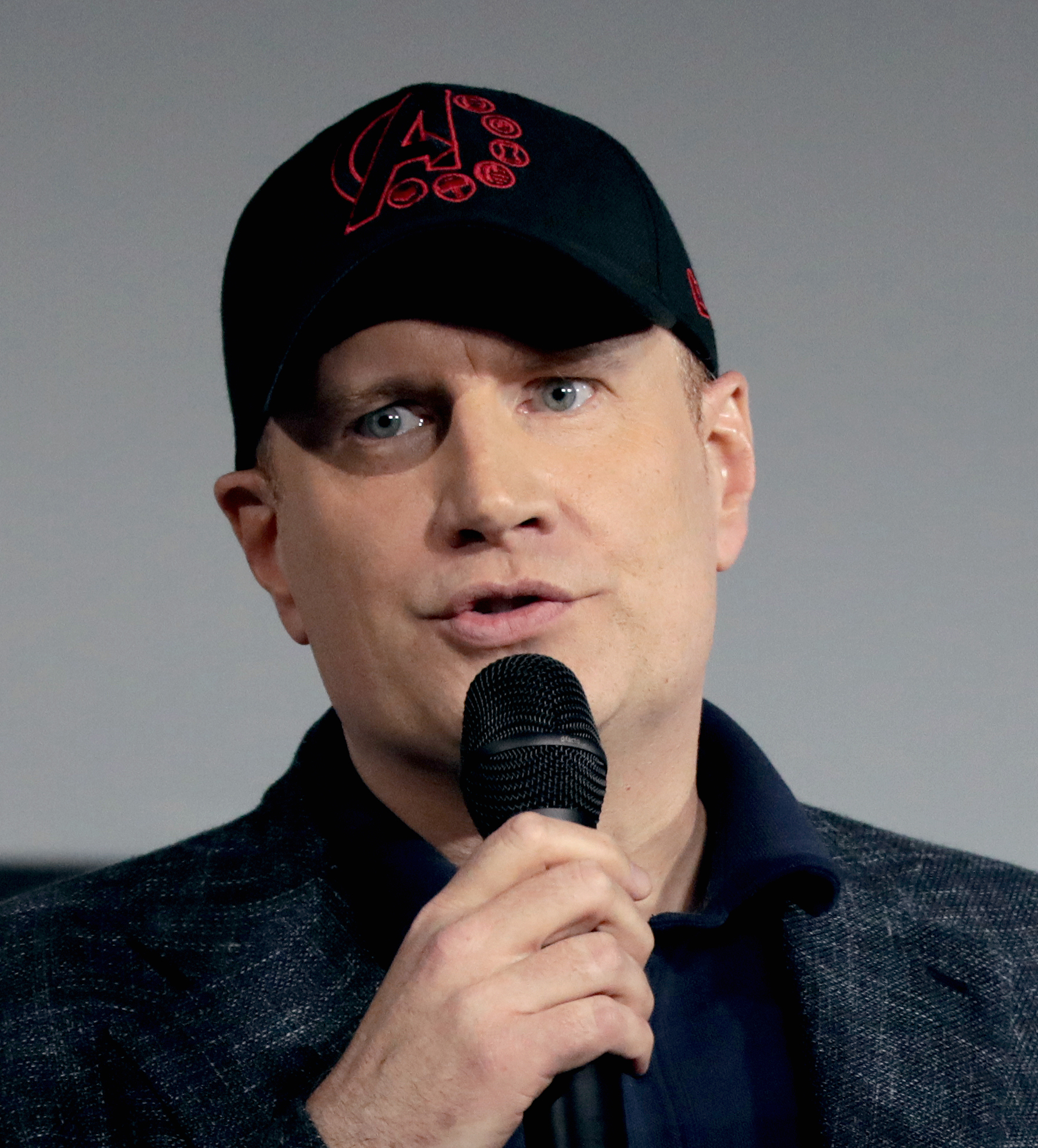
Kevin Feige helped conceive a shared media universe of Marvel properties.

- Avi Arad – Founder of Marvel Studios
- David Maisel – Founding Chairman of Marvel Studios
- Kevin Feige – President of Marvel Studios and chief creative officer of Marvel
- Louis D'Esposito – Co-president of Marvel Studios
- Brad Winderbaum – Head of Streaming, Television and Animation at Marvel Studios, former Vice President of Production and Development
- Victoria Alonso – Former president of production at Marvel Studios
- Jeph Loeb – Former executive vice president of Marvel Television
- Stan Lee – Creator or co-creator of many Marvel characters adapted in the MCU, who frequently made cameo appearances

== Content ==
=== Feature films ===
Marvel Studios releases its films in groups called "Phases", with three phases making up a "Saga".

==== The Infinity Saga ====
The films from Phase One, Phase Two, and Phase Three are collectively known as "The Infinity Saga".

===== Phase One =====
Phase One films
| Film | U.S. release date | Directed by | Screenplay by | Produced by |
|---|---|---|---|---|
| Iron Man | May 2, 2008 | Jon Favreau | Mark Fergus & Hawk Ostby and Art Marcum & Matt Holloway | Avi Arad and Kevin Feige |
| The Incredible Hulk | June 13, 2008 | Louis Leterrier | Zak Penn | Avi Arad, Gale Anne Hurd, and Kevin Feige |
| Iron Man 2 | May 7, 2010 | Jon Favreau | Justin Theroux | Kevin Feige |
| Thor | May 6, 2011 | Kenneth Branagh | Ashley Edward Miller & Zack Stentz and Don Payne | Kevin Feige |
| Captain America: The First Avenger | July 22, 2011 | Joe Johnston | Christopher Markus & Stephen McFeely | Kevin Feige |
| The Avengers | May 4, 2012 | Joss Whedon | Joss Whedon | Kevin Feige |

===== Phase Two =====
Phase Two films
| Film | U.S. release date | Directed by | Screenplay by | Produced by |
|---|---|---|---|---|
| Iron Man 3 | May 3, 2013 | Shane Black | Drew Pearce & Shane Black | Kevin Feige |
| Thor: The Dark World | November 8, 2013 | Alan Taylor | Christopher L. Yost and Christopher Markus & Stephen McFeely | Kevin Feige |
| Captain America: The Winter Soldier | April 4, 2014 | Anthony and Joe Russo | Christopher Markus & Stephen McFeely | Kevin Feige |
| Guardians of the Galaxy | August 1, 2014 | James Gunn | James Gunn and Nicole Perlman | Kevin Feige |
| Avengers: Age of Ultron | May 1, 2015 | Joss Whedon | Joss Whedon | Kevin Feige |
| Ant-Man | July 17, 2015 | Peyton Reed | Edgar Wright & Joe Cornish and Adam McKay & Paul Rudd | Kevin Feige |

===== Phase Three =====
Phase Three films
| Film | U.S. release date | Directed by | Screenplay by | Produced by |
|---|---|---|---|---|
| Captain America: Civil War | May 6, 2016 | Anthony and Joe Russo | Christopher Markus & Stephen McFeely | Kevin Feige |
| Doctor Strange | November 4, 2016 | Scott Derrickson | Jon Spaihts and Scott Derrickson & C. Robert Cargill | Kevin Feige |
| Guardians of the Galaxy Vol. 2 | May 5, 2017 | James Gunn | James Gunn | Kevin Feige |
| Spider-Man: Homecoming | July 7, 2017 | Jon Watts | Jonathan Goldstein & John Francis Daley and Jon Watts & Christopher Ford and Chris McKenna & Erik Sommers | Kevin Feige and Amy Pascal |
| Thor: Ragnarok | November 3, 2017 | Taika Waititi | Eric Pearson and Craig Kyle & Christopher L. Yost | Kevin Feige |
| Black Panther | February 16, 2018 | Ryan Coogler | Ryan Coogler & Joe Robert Cole | Kevin Feige |
| Avengers: Infinity War | April 27, 2018 | Anthony and Joe Russo | Christopher Markus & Stephen McFeely | Kevin Feige |
| Ant-Man and the Wasp | July 6, 2018 | Peyton Reed | Chris McKenna & Erik Sommers and Paul Rudd & Andrew Barrer & Gabriel Ferrari | Kevin Feige and Stephen Broussard |
| Captain Marvel | March 8, 2019 | Anna Boden & Ryan Fleck | Anna Boden & Ryan Fleck & Geneva Robertson-Dworet | Kevin Feige |
| Avengers: Endgame | April 26, 2019 | Anthony and Joe Russo | Christopher Markus & Stephen McFeely | Kevin Feige |
| Spider-Man: Far From Home | July 2, 2019 | Jon Watts | Chris McKenna & Erik Sommers | Kevin Feige and Amy Pascal |

==== The Multiverse Saga ====
The films from Phase Four, Phase Five, and Phase Six are collectively known as "The Multiverse Saga". The Phases also include multiple television series and three television specials streaming on Disney+.

===== Phase Four films =====
Phase Four films
| Film | U.S. release date | Directed by | Screenplay by | Produced by |
|---|---|---|---|---|
| Black Widow | July 9, 2021 (Note: Black Widow was released concurrently on Disney+ with Premier Access.) | Cate Shortland | Eric Pearson | Kevin Feige |
| Shang-Chi and the Legend of the Ten Rings | September 3, 2021 | Destin Daniel Cretton | Dave Callaham & Destin Daniel Cretton & Andrew Lanham | Kevin Feige and Jonathan Schwartz |
| Eternals | November 5, 2021 | Chloé Zhao | Chloé Zhao and Chloé Zhao & Patrick Burleigh and Ryan Firpo & Kaz Firpo (Note: Zhao is credited both as a solo writer and as part of a writing team with Burleigh.) | Kevin Feige and Nate Moore |
| Spider-Man: No Way Home | December 17, 2021 | Jon Watts | Chris McKenna & Erik Sommers | Kevin Feige and Amy Pascal |
| Doctor Strange in the Multiverse of Madness | May 6, 2022 | Sam Raimi | Michael Waldron | Kevin Feige |
| Thor: Love and Thunder | July 8, 2022 | Taika Waititi | Taika Waititi & Jennifer Kaytin Robinson | Kevin Feige and Brad Winderbaum |
| Black Panther: Wakanda Forever | November 11, 2022 | Ryan Coogler | Ryan Coogler & Joe Robert Cole | Kevin Feige and Nate Moore |

===== Phase Five films =====
Phase Five films
| Film | U.S. release date | Directed by | Screenplay by | Produced by |
|---|---|---|---|---|
| Ant-Man and the Wasp: Quantumania | February 17, 2023 | Peyton Reed | Jeff Loveness | Kevin Feige and Stephen Broussard |
| Guardians of the Galaxy Vol. 3 | May 5, 2023 | James Gunn | James Gunn | Kevin Feige |
| The Marvels | November 10, 2023 | Nia DaCosta | Nia DaCosta and Megan McDonnell and Elissa Karasik | Kevin Feige |
| Deadpool & Wolverine | July 26, 2024 | Shawn Levy | Ryan Reynolds & Rhett Reese & Paul Wernick & Zeb Wells & Shawn Levy | Kevin Feige, Lauren Shuler Donner, Ryan Reynolds, and Shawn Levy |
| Captain America: Brave New World | February 14, 2025 | Julius Onah | Rob Edwards and Malcolm Spellman & Dalan Musson and Julius Onah & Peter Glanz | Kevin Feige and Nate Moore |
| Thunderbolts* (Note: The asterisk denotes the alternate title, The New Avengers, as revealed in the film's end credits.) | May 2, 2025 | Jake Schreier | Eric Pearson and Joanna Calo | Kevin Feige |

===== Phase Six films =====
Phase Six films
| Film | U.S. release date | Directed by | Screenplay by | Produced by | Status |
|---|---|---|---|---|---|
| The Fantastic Four: First Steps | July 25, 2025 | Matt Shakman | Josh Friedman and Eric Pearson and Jeff Kaplan & Ian Springer | Kevin Feige | Released |
| Spider-Man: Brand New Day | July 31, 2026 | Destin Daniel Cretton | Chris McKenna & Erik Sommers | Kevin Feige, Amy Pascal, Avi Arad, and Rachel O'Connor | Released |
| Avengers: Doomsday | December 18, 2026 | Anthony and Joe Russo | Stephen McFeely and Michael Waldron | Kevin Feige, Louis D'Esposito, and Jonathan Schwartz | Post-production |
| Avengers: Secret Wars | December 17, 2027 | Anthony and Joe Russo | Michael Waldron and Stephen McFeely and Chris McKenna & Erik Sommers | Kevin Feige, Louis D'Esposito, and Jonathan Schwartz | Pre-production |

==== Phase Seven films ====
Phase Seven films
| Film | U.S. release date | Directed by | Screenplay by | Produced by | Status |
|---|---|---|---|---|---|
| Untitled X-Men film | May 5, 2028 | Jake Schreier | Michael Lesslie and Joanna Calo & Lee Sung Jin | Kevin Feige | Pre-production |
| Ghost Rider | July 28, 2028 | Shawn Levy | Jonathan Tropper | Kevin Feige, Louis D'Esposito, Stephen Broussard, Shawn Levy, and Ryan Gosling | Pre-production |
| Black Panther III | December 15, 2028 | Ryan Coogler | Ryan Coogler | Kevin Feige and Nate Moore | In development |

==== Future films ====
Future films of the Marvel Cinematic Universe
| Film | U.S. release date | Directed by | Screenplay by | Produced by | Status |
|---|---|---|---|---|---|
| Armor Wars | TBA | TBA | Yassir Lester | Kevin Feige | In development |
| Untitled Nova film | TBA | TBA | Michael Waldron | Kevin Feige | In development |
| Untitled Shang-Chi and the Legend of the Ten Rings sequel | TBA | Destin Daniel Cretton | Destin Daniel Cretton & David Callaham | Kevin Feige and Jonathan Schwartz | In development |

=== Television series ===
==== Marvel Television series ====
===== ABC series =====
ABC television series from Marvel Television
| Series | Season | Episodes | Originally released | | Showrunner(s) |
| Series | Season | Episodes | First released | Last released | Showrunner(s) |
|---|---|---|---|---|---|
| Agents of S.H.I.E.L.D. | 1 | 22 | September 24, 2013 | May 13, 2014 | Jed Whedon, Maurissa Tancharoen, and Jeffrey Bell |
| Agents of S.H.I.E.L.D. | 2 | 22 | September 23, 2014 | May 12, 2015 | Jed Whedon, Maurissa Tancharoen, and Jeffrey Bell |
| Agents of S.H.I.E.L.D. | 3 | 22 | September 29, 2015 | May 17, 2016 | Jed Whedon, Maurissa Tancharoen, and Jeffrey Bell |
| Agents of S.H.I.E.L.D. | 4 | 22 | September 20, 2016 | May 16, 2017 | Jed Whedon, Maurissa Tancharoen, and Jeffrey Bell |
| Agents of S.H.I.E.L.D. | 5 | 22 | December 1, 2017 | May 18, 2018 | Jed Whedon, Maurissa Tancharoen, and Jeffrey Bell |
| Agents of S.H.I.E.L.D. | 6 | 13 | May 10, 2019 | August 2, 2019 | Jed Whedon, Maurissa Tancharoen, and Jeffrey Bell |
| Agents of S.H.I.E.L.D. | 7 | 13 | May 27, 2020 | August 12, 2020 | Jed Whedon, Maurissa Tancharoen, and Jeffrey Bell |
| Agent Carter | 1 | 8 | January 6, 2015 | February 24, 2015 | Tara Butters, Michele Fazekas, and Chris Dingess |
| Agent Carter | 2 | 10 | January 19, 2016 | March 1, 2016 | Tara Butters, Michele Fazekas, and Chris Dingess |
| Inhumans | 1 | 8 | September 29, 2017 (Note: A version of the first two episodes debuted in IMAX theaters on September 1, 2017, and ran for two weeks, before their television premiere on ABC on September 29.) | November 10, 2017 | Scott Buck |

===== Netflix series =====
Netflix television series from Marvel Television
| Series | Season | Episodes | Originally released | Showrunner(s) |
|---|---|---|---|---|
| Daredevil | 1 | 13 | April 10, 2015 | Steven S. DeKnight |
| Daredevil | 2 | 13 | March 18, 2016 | Douglas Petrie and Marco Ramirez |
| Daredevil | 3 | 13 | October 19, 2018 | Erik Oleson |
| Jessica Jones | 1 | 13 | November 20, 2015 | Melissa Rosenberg |
| Jessica Jones | 2 | 13 | March 8, 2018 | Melissa Rosenberg |
| Jessica Jones | 3 | 13 | June 14, 2019 | Melissa Rosenberg and Scott Reynolds |
| Luke Cage | 1 | 13 | September 30, 2016 | Cheo Hodari Coker |
| Luke Cage | 2 | 13 | June 22, 2018 | Cheo Hodari Coker |
| Iron Fist | 1 | 13 | March 17, 2017 | Scott Buck |
| Iron Fist | 2 | 10 | September 7, 2018 | M. Raven Metzner |
| The Defenders | 1 | 8 | August 18, 2017 | Marco Ramirez |
| The Punisher | 1 | 13 | November 17, 2017 | Steve Lightfoot |
| The Punisher | 2 | 13 | January 18, 2019 | Steve Lightfoot |

===== Young adult series =====
Young adult television series from Marvel Television
| Series | Season | Episodes | Originally released | | | Showrunner(s) |
| Series | Season | Episodes | First released | Last released | Network | Showrunner(s) |
|---|---|---|---|---|---|---|
| Runaways | 1 | 10 | November 21, 2017 | January 9, 2018 | Hulu | Josh Schwartz and Stephanie Savage |
| Runaways | 2 | 13 | December 21, 2018 | | Hulu | Josh Schwartz and Stephanie Savage |
| Runaways | 3 | 10 | December 13, 2019 | | Hulu | Josh Schwartz and Stephanie Savage |
| Cloak & Dagger | 1 | 10 | June 7, 2018 | August 2, 2018 | Freeform | Joe Pokaski |
| Cloak & Dagger | 2 | 10 | April 4, 2019 | May 30, 2019 | Freeform | Joe Pokaski |

===== Adventure into Fear =====
Adventure into Fear television series from Marvel Television
| Series | Season | Episodes | Originally released | Network | Showrunner |
|---|---|---|---|---|---|
| Helstrom (Note: Production of Helstrom was moved to Marvel Studios following the shut down of Marvel Television, with executives from Marvel Television staying on to supervise the completion of the series.) | 1 | 10 | October 16, 2020 | Hulu | Paul Zbyszewski |

==== Marvel Studios series ====
Television series produced by Marvel Studios are released exclusively on Disney+, unless otherwise noted, and as part of their corresponding Phases.

===== Phase Four series =====
Television series of Phase Four
| Series | Season | Episodes | Originally released | | Production division | Head writer | Lead director(s) |
| Series | Season | Episodes | First released | Last released | Production division | Head writer | Lead director(s) |
|---|---|---|---|---|---|---|---|
| WandaVision | 1 | 9 | January 15, 2021 | March 5, 2021 | —N/a | Jac Schaeffer | Matt Shakman |
| The Falcon and the Winter Soldier | 1 | 6 | March 19, 2021 | April 23, 2021 | —N/a | Malcolm Spellman | Kari Skogland |
| Loki | 1 | 6 | June 9, 2021 | July 14, 2021 | —N/a | Michael Waldron | Kate Herron |
| What If...? | 1 | 9 | August 11, 2021 | October 6, 2021 | Marvel Studios Animation | A. C. Bradley | Bryan Andrews |
| Hawkeye | 1 | 6 | November 24, 2021 | December 22, 2021 | —N/a | Jonathan Igla | Rhys Thomas |
| Moon Knight | 1 | 6 | March 30, 2022 | May 4, 2022 | —N/a | Jeremy Slater | Mohamed Diab |
| Ms. Marvel | 1 | 6 | June 8, 2022 | July 13, 2022 | —N/a | Bisha K. Ali | Adil & Bilall |
| She-Hulk: Attorney at Law | 1 | 9 | August 18, 2022 | October 13, 2022 | —N/a | Jessica Gao | Kat Coiro |

===== Phase Five series =====
Television series of Phase Five
| Series | Season | Episodes | Originally released | | Production division / label (Note: Marvel Studios introduced several new labels and banners under which its series are released, starting in 2024.) | Head writer(s) / showrunner (Note: By October 2023, Marvel Studios shifted their creative philosophy to a more traditional television development process, moving away from head writers and beginning to hire dedicated showrunners for their series. The showrunner title applies to Jac Schaeffer on Agatha All Along and Dario Scardapane on Daredevil: Born Again, while Jeff Trammell served as both the head writer and showrunner of Your Friendly Neighborhood Spider-Man.) | Lead director(s) |
| Series | Season | Episodes | First released | Last released | Production division / label | Head writer(s) / showrunner | Lead director(s) |
|---|---|---|---|---|---|---|---|
| Secret Invasion | 1 | 6 | June 21, 2023 | July 26, 2023 | —N/a | Kyle Bradstreet (Note: During production of Secret Invasion, Bradstreet was replaced as writer by Brian Tucker, who received the majority of the writing credits on the series.) | Ali Selim |
| Loki | 2 | 6 | October 5, 2023 | November 9, 2023 | —N/a | Eric Martin | Justin Benson & Aaron Moorhead |
| What If...? | 2 | 9 | December 22, 2023 | December 30, 2023 | Marvel Studios Animation | A.C. Bradley | Bryan Andrews |
| What If...? | 3 | 8 | December 22, 2024 | December 29, 2024 | Marvel Animation | Matthew Chauncey | Stephan Franck and Bryan Andrews |
| Echo | 1 | 5 | January 9, 2024 (Note: Echo was released simultaneously on Disney+ and Hulu and was available on Hulu until April 9, 2024.) | | Marvel Spotlight | Marion Dayre and Amy Rardin | Sydney Freeland |
| Agatha All Along | 1 | 9 | September 18, 2024 | October 30, 2024 | Marvel Television | Jac Schaeffer | Jac Schaeffer |
| Your Friendly Neighborhood Spider-Man | 1 | 10 | January 29, 2025 | February 19, 2025 | Marvel Animation | Jeff Trammell | Mel Zwyer |
| Daredevil: Born Again | 1 | 9 | March 4, 2025 | April 15, 2025 | Marvel Television | Dario Scardapane | Justin Benson & Aaron Moorhead |
| Ironheart | 1 | 6 | June 24, 2025 | July 1, 2025 | Marvel Television | Chinaka Hodge | Sam Bailey and Angela Barnes |

===== Phase Six series =====
Television series of Phase Six
| Series | Season | Episodes | Originally released | | Production label(s) | Showrunner (Note: Zeb Wells served as the head writer for Marvel Zombies, while Jennifer Muro served as head writer on the Marvel Zombies continuation special, The Winter Soldier. Jeff Trammell served as both the head writer and showrunner of Your Friendly Neighborhood Spider-Man.) | Lead director(s) | Status |
| Series | Season | Episodes | First released | Last released | Production label(s) | Showrunner | Lead director(s) | Status |
|---|---|---|---|---|---|---|---|---|
| Eyes of Wakanda | 1 | 4 | August 1, 2025 | | Marvel Animation | Todd Harris | Todd Harris and John Fang | Released |
| Marvel Zombies | 1 | 4 | September 24, 2025 | | Marvel Animation | Bryan Andrews | Bryan Andrews | Released |
| Marvel Zombies | The Winter Soldier | 2 | October 2027 | | Marvel Animation | Bryan Andrews | Bryan Andrews | In production |
| Wonder Man | 1 | 8 | January 27, 2026 | | Marvel Television; Marvel Spotlight | Andrew Guest | Destin Daniel Cretton | Released |
| Daredevil: Born Again | 2 | 8 | March 24, 2026 | May 5, 2026 | Marvel Television | Dario Scardapane | Justin Benson & Aaron Moorhead | Released |
| Daredevil: Born Again | 3 | 8 | March 2027 | TBA | Marvel Television | Dario Scardapane | Justin Benson & Aaron Moorhead | Post-production |
| VisionQuest | 1 | 8 | October 13, 2026 | November 10, 2026 | Marvel Television | Terry Matalas | Terry Matalas | Released |
| Your Friendly Neighborhood Spider-Man | 2 | TBA | January 13, 2027 | TBA | Marvel Animation | Jeff Trammell | TBA | In production |

===== Phase Seven series =====
Television series of Phase Seven
| Series | Season | Episodes | Originally released | | Production label | Showrunner (Note: Jennifer Muro served as the head writer for the Marvel Zombies specials The Fist of Khonshu and The Last Guardian, while Jeff Trammell served as both the head writer and showrunner of Your Friendly Neighborhood Spider-Man.) | Lead director | Status |
| Series | Season | Episodes | First released | Last released | Production label | Showrunner | Lead director | Status |
|---|---|---|---|---|---|---|---|---|
| Your Friendly Neighborhood Spider-Man | 3 | TBA | 2028 | TBA | Marvel Animation | Jeff Trammell | TBA | In production |
| Your Friendly Neighborhood Spider-Man | 4 | TBA | 2029 | TBA | Marvel Animation | Jeff Trammell | TBA | In production |
| Marvel Zombies | The Fist of Khonshu | 2 | October 2028 | | Marvel Animation | Bryan Andrews | Bryan Andrews | In production |
| Marvel Zombies | The Last Guardian | 2 | October 2029 | | Marvel Animation | Bryan Andrews | Bryan Andrews | In production |
| Zodiac | 1 | TBA | 2028 | TBA | Marvel Television | TBA | TBA | Pre-production |

=== Television specials ===
Television specials produced by Marvel Studios and released on Disney+ are marketed as "Marvel Studios Special Presentations" and "Marvel Television Special Presentations".

==== Phase Four specials ====
Phase Four television specials
| Special | Release date | Director | Writer(s) |
|---|---|---|---|
| Werewolf by Night | October 7, 2022 | Michael Giacchino | Heather Quinn and Peter Cameron |
| The Guardians of the Galaxy Holiday Special | November 25, 2022 | James Gunn | |

==== Phase Six special ====
Phase Six television special
| Special | Release date | Director | Writers |
|---|---|---|---|
| The Punisher: One Last Kill | May 12, 2026 | Reinaldo Marcus Green | Jon Bernthal & Reinaldo Marcus Green |

=== Short films ===
==== Marvel One-Shots ====
Short films in the Marvel Cinematic Universe
| Film | U.S. release date | Director | Screenwriter | Producer | Home media release |
|---|---|---|---|---|---|
| The Consultant | September 13, 2011 | Leythum | Eric Pearson | Kevin Feige | Thor |
| A Funny Thing Happened on the Way to Thor's Hammer | October 25, 2011 | Leythum | Eric Pearson | Kevin Feige | Captain America: The First Avenger |
| Item 47 | September 25, 2012 | Louis D'Esposito | Eric Pearson | Kevin Feige | Marvel's The Avengers |
| Agent Carter | September 3, 2013 (digital); September 24, 2013 (physical) | Louis D'Esposito | Eric Pearson | Kevin Feige | Iron Man 3 |
| All Hail the King | February 4, 2014 (digital); February 25, 2014 (physical) | Drew Pearce | Drew Pearce | Kevin Feige | Thor: The Dark World |

===== Team Thor =====
Short film series in the Marvel Cinematic Universe
| Film | U.S. release date | | Director & Screenwriter | Producer | Home media release |
| Film | Digital | Physical | Director & Screenwriter | Producer | Home media release |
|---|---|---|---|---|---|
| Team Thor | August 28, 2016 | September 13, 2016 | Taika Waititi | Kevin Feige | Captain America: Civil War |
| Team Thor: Part 2 | February 14, 2017 | February 28, 2017 | Taika Waititi | Kevin Feige | Doctor Strange |
| Team Darryl | February 20, 2018 | March 6, 2018 | Taika Waititi | Kevin Feige | Thor: Ragnarok |

==== I Am Groot ====
| Series | Season | Episodes | Originally released | Network | Writer and director | Phase |
|---|---|---|---|---|---|---|
| I Am Groot | 1 | 5 | August 10, 2022 | Disney+ | Kirsten Lepore | Four |
| I Am Groot | 2 | 5 | September 6, 2023 | Disney+ | Kirsten Lepore | Five |

=== Digital series ===
==== Agents of S.H.I.E.L.D. web series ====
Web series in the Marvel Cinematic Universe
| Series | Season | Episodes | Originally released | | |
| Series | Season | Episodes | First released | Last released | Network |
|---|---|---|---|---|---|
| Agents of S.H.I.E.L.D.: Declassified | 1 | 23 | September 23, 2013 | May 13, 2014 | ABC.com, Marvel.com, WatchABC.com, and Watch ABC |
| Agents of S.H.I.E.L.D.: Double Agent | 1 | 5 | March 4, 2015 | May 6, 2015 | ABC.com |
| Agents of S.H.I.E.L.D.: Academy | 1 | 5 | March 9, 2016 | May 4, 2016 | ABC.com and Watch ABC |
| Agents of S.H.I.E.L.D.: Slingshot | 1 | 6 | December 13, 2016 | | ABC.com |

==== Faux current affairs digital series ====
| Series | Season | Episodes | Originally released | | |
| Series | Season | Episodes | First released | Last released | Network |
|---|---|---|---|---|---|
| WHIH Newsfront | 1 | 5 | July 2, 2015 | July 16, 2015 | YouTube |
| WHIH Newsfront | 2 | 5 | April 22, 2016 | May 3, 2016 | YouTube |
| The Daily Bugle | 1 | 6 | October 23, 2019 | November 20, 2019 | YouTube |
| The Daily Bugle | 2 | 19 | November 24, 2021 | April 29, 2022 | TikTok and YouTube |

=== Tie-in comic books ===
Marvel Cinematic Universe tie-in comics
| Title | No. of Issues | Publication date(s) | | Writer(s) | Artist(s) |
| Title | No. of Issues | First published | Last published | Writer(s) | Artist(s) |
|---|---|---|---|---|---|
| Iron Man: I Am Iron Man! | 2 | January 27, 2010 | February 24, 2010 | Peter David | Sean Chen |
| Iron Man 2: Public Identity | 3 | April 28, 2010 | May 12, 2010 | Joe Casey and Justin Theroux | Barry Kitson |
| Iron Man 2: Agents of S.H.I.E.L.D. | 1 | September 1, 2010 | | Joe Casey | Tim Green, Felix Ruiz, and Matt Camp |
| Captain America: First Vengeance | 8 (digital); 4 (print) | May 4, 2011 | June 29, 2011 | Fred Van Lente | Neil Edwards and Luke Ross |
| Marvel's The Avengers Prelude: Fury's Big Week | 8 (digital); 4 (print) | March 7, 2012 | April 18, 2012 | Story by : Christopher Yost and Eric Pearson; Scripts by : Eric Pearson | Luke Ross |
| Marvel's The Avengers: Black Widow Strikes | 3 | May 2, 2012 | June 6, 2012 | Fred Van Lente | Neil Edwards |
| Marvel's Iron Man 2 | 2 | November 7, 2012 | December 5, 2012 | Christos Gage | Ramon Rosanas |
| Marvel's Thor | 2 | January 16, 2013 | February 20, 2013 | Christos Gage | Lan Medina |
| Marvel's Captain America: The First Avenger | 2 | November 6, 2013 | December 11, 2013 | Peter David | Wellinton Alves |
| Marvel's The Avengers | 2 | December 24, 2014 | January 7, 2015 | Will Corona Pilgrim | Joe Bennett |
| Marvel's Iron Man 3 Prelude | 2 | January 2, 2013 | February 6, 2013 | Christos Gage | Steve Kurth |
| Marvel's Thor: The Dark World Prelude | 2 | June 5, 2013 | July 10, 2013 | Craig Kyle and Christopher Yost | Scot Eaton and Ron Lim |
| Marvel's Captain America: The Winter Soldier Infinite Comic | 1 | January 28, 2014 | | Peter David | Rock He-Kim |
| Marvel's Guardians of the Galaxy Infinite Comic – Dangerous Prey | 1 | April 1, 2014 | | Dan Abnett and Andy Lanning | Andrea Di Vito |
| Marvel's Guardians of the Galaxy Prelude | 2 | April 2, 2014 | May 28, 2014 | Dan Abnett and Andy Lanning | Wellinton Alves |
| Marvel's Avengers: Age of Ultron Prelude – This Scepter'd Isle | 1 | February 3, 2015 | | Will Corona Pilgrim | Wellinton Alves |
| Marvel's Ant-Man Prelude | 2 | February 4, 2015 | March 4, 2015 | Will Corona Pilgrim | Miguel Sepulveda |
| Marvel's Ant-Man – Scott Lang: Small Time | 1 | March 3, 2015 | | Will Corona Pilgrim | Wellinton Alves and Daniel Govar |
| Marvel's Jessica Jones | 1 | October 7, 2015 | | Brian Michael Bendis | Michael Gaydos |
| Marvel's Captain America: Civil War Prelude | 4 | December 16, 2015 | January 27, 2016 | Will Corona Pilgrim (Note: References for Will Corona Pilgrim writing various MCU tie-in comics:) | Szymon Kudranski and Lee Ferguson |
| Marvel's Captain America: Civil War Prelude Infinite Comic | 1 | February 10, 2016 | | Will Corona Pilgrim | Lee Ferguson, Goran Sudžuka, and Guillermo Mogorron |
| Marvel's Doctor Strange Prelude | 2 | July 6, 2016 | August 24, 2016 | Will Corona Pilgrim | Jorge Fornés |
| Marvel's Doctor Strange Prelude Infinite Comic – The Zealot | 1 | September 7, 2016 | | Will Corona Pilgrim | Jorge Fornés |
| Marvel's Guardians of the Galaxy Vol. 2 Prelude | 2 | January 4, 2017 | February 1, 2017 | Will Corona Pilgrim | Christopher Allen |
| Spider-Man: Homecoming Prelude | 2 | March 1, 2017 | April 5, 2017 | Will Corona Pilgrim | Todd Nauck |
| Marvel's Thor: Ragnarok Prelude | 4 | July 5, 2017 | August 16, 2017 | Will Corona Pilgrim | J.L. Giles |
| Marvel's Black Panther Prelude | 2 | October 18, 2017 | November 15, 2017 | Will Corona Pilgrim | Annapaola Martello |
| Marvel's Avengers: Infinity War Prelude | 2 | December 18, 2017 January 24, 2018 | February 5, 2018 February 28, 2018 | Will Corona Pilgrim | Tigh Walker and Jorge Fornés |
| Marvel's Ant-Man and the Wasp Prelude | 2 | March 7, 2018 | April 4, 2018 | Will Corona Pilgrim | Chris Allen |
| Marvel's Captain Marvel Prelude | 1 | November 14, 2018 | | Will Corona Pilgrim | Andrea Di Vito |
| Marvel's Avengers: Endgame Prelude | 3 | December 5, 2018 | February 20, 2019 | Will Corona Pilgrim | Paco Diaz |
| Spider-Man: Far From Home Prelude | 2 | March 27, 2019 | April 24, 2019 | Will Corona Pilgrim | Luca Maresca |
| Marvel's Black Widow Prelude | 2 | January 15, 2020 | February 19, 2020 | Peter David | C.F. Villa |
| Eternals: The 500 Year War | 7 | January 12, 2022 | | Dan Abnett, Aki Yanagi, Jongmin Shin, Ju-Yeon Park, David Macho, Rafael Scavone, and Yifan Jiang | Geoffo, Matt Milla, Joe Sabino, Rickie Yagawa, Carlos Macias, Do Gyun Kim, Fernando Sifuentes, Magda Price, Pete Pantazis, Marcio Fiorito, Felipe Sobreiro, and Gunji |
| Your Friendly Neighborhood Spider-Man | 5 | December 11, 2024 | April 23, 2025 | Christos Gage | Eric Gapstur |
| Fantastic Four: First Steps | 1 | July 9, 2025 | | Matt Fraction | Mark Buckingham |
| Fantastic Four: First Foes | 1 | March 25, 2026 | | Dan Slott | Mark Buckingham |
| Fantastic Four: First Foes – Shalla-Bal | 1 | July 8, 2026 | | Charles Soule | Mark Buckingham |
| Fantastic Four: First Foes – Dragon Man | 1 | September 30, 2026 | | Greg Pak | Mark Buckingham |
| Fantastic Four: First Foes – The Wizard | 1 | December 9, 2026 | | Fabian Nicieza | Mark Buckingham |
| Your Friendly Neighborhood Spider-Man Season 2 | 4 | December 9, 2026 | TBA | Christos Gage | Eric Gapstur |

=== Music ===
Various composers have created the film and television scores of the MCU films, television series, One-Shots, Special Presentations, and other related projects of the MCU, primarily released by Marvel Studios's record label Marvel Music. Original songs have also been created specifically for use in the franchise, while Brian Tyler and Michael Giacchino have both scored fanfares for the Marvel Studios production logo.

The original songs of the MCU are:

- "Live to Rise" (2012)
- "All the Stars" (2018)
- "King's Dead" (2018)
- "Pray for Me" (2018)
- "Agatha All Along" (2021)
- "Run It" (2021)
- "Lift Me Up" (2022)
- "Slash" (2024)
- "The Ballad of the Witches' Road" (2024)

== Recurring cast and characters ==
List indicators

This section includes characters who will appear or have appeared in at least three MCU films or television series and received main billing credit in at least two film franchises or series.

- A dark grey cell indicates the character was not in the media, or that the character's presence has not yet been confirmed.
- A ^{P} indicates an appearance in onscreen photographs.
- A ^{V} indicates a voice-only role.

Recurring cast members and characters in the Marvel Cinematic Universe
| Character | Feature films | Television series and specials | Short films | Digital series | Animation |
|---|---|---|---|---|---|
| Ayo | Florence Kasumba | Florence Kasumba | | | |
| Bruce Banner Hulk | Edward Norton; Lou Ferrigno^{V} Mark Ruffalo | Mark Ruffalo | Mark Ruffalo | | Mark Ruffalo |
| Bucky Barnes Winter Soldier / White Wolf | Sebastian Stan | Sebastian Stan | | | Sebastian Stan |
| Clint Barton Hawkeye / Ronin | Jeremy Renner | Jeremy Renner | | | Jeremy Renner |
| Laura Barton | Linda Cardellini | Linda Cardellini | | | |
| Yelena Belova | Florence Pugh | Florence Pugh | | | Florence Pugh |
| Kate Bishop | Hailee Steinfeld | Hailee Steinfeld | | | Hailee Steinfeld |
| Emil Blonsky Abomination | Tim Roth | Tim Roth | | | |
| Luke Cage | | Mike Colter | | | |
| Peggy Carter | Hayley Atwell | Hayley Atwell | Hayley Atwell | | Hayley Atwell |
| Sharon Carter Agent 13 / Power Broker | Emily VanCamp | Emily VanCamp | | | Emily VanCamp |
| Frank Castle Punisher | Jon Bernthal | Jon Bernthal | | | |
| P. Cleary | Arian Moayed | Arian Moayed | | | |
| Phil Coulson | Clark Gregg | Clark Gregg | Clark Gregg | Clark Gregg | Clark Gregg |
| Carol Danvers Captain Marvel | Brie Larson | Brie Larson | | | Alexandra Daniels |
| Drax the Destroyer | Dave Bautista | Dave Bautista | | | Fred Tatasciore |
| Hope van Dyne Wasp | Evangeline Lilly | | | | Evangeline Lilly |
| Wilson Fisk Kingpin | | Vincent D'Onofrio | | | |
| Valentina Allegra de Fontaine | Julia Louis-Dreyfus | Julia Louis-Dreyfus | | | |
| F.R.I.D.A.Y. | Kerry Condon^{V} | Orla Brady | | | Kerry Condon |
| Nick Fury | Samuel L. Jackson | Samuel L. Jackson | | | Samuel L. Jackson |
| Gamora | Zoë Saldaña | | | | Cynthia McWilliams |
| Ben Grimm The Thing | Ebon Moss-Bachrach | | | | |
| Groot | Vin Diesel^{V} | Vin Diesel^{V} | Vin Diesel^{V} | | Fred Tatasciore |
| Justin Hammer | Sam Rockwell | | Sam Rockwell | | Sam Rockwell |
| Agatha Harkness | | Kathryn Hahn | | | Kathryn Hahn |
| Heimdall | Idris Elba | | | | Idris Elba |
| Maria Hill | Cobie Smulders | Cobie Smulders | | | Cobie Smulders |
| Happy Hogan | Jon Favreau | | | | Jon Favreau |
| J.A.R.V.I.S. Edwin Jarvis | Paul Bettany; James D'Arcy | James D'Arcy | | | James D'Arcy |
| Jessica Jones | | Krysten Ritter | | | |
| Kamala Khan Ms. Marvel | Iman Vellani | Iman Vellani | | | Iman Vellani |
| Muneeba Khan | Zenobia Shroff | Zenobia Shroff | | | Zenobia Shroff |
| Yusuf Khan | Mohan Kapur | Mohan Kapur | | | |
| Misty Knight | | Simone Missick | | | |
| Korath | Djimon Hounsou | | | | Djimon Hounsou |
| Scott Lang Ant-Man | Paul Rudd | | | Paul Rudd | Paul Rudd |
| Darcy Lewis | Kat Dennings | Kat Dennings | | | Kat Dennings |
| Loki | Tom Hiddleston | Tom Hiddleston | | | Tom Hiddleston |
| Mantis | Pom Klementieff | Pom Klementieff | | | |
| Billy Maximoff / William Kaplan Wiccan | Julian Hilliard | Julian Hilliard Joe Locke | | | |
| Wanda Maximoff Scarlet Witch | Elizabeth Olsen | Elizabeth Olsen | | | Elizabeth Olsen |
| M'Baku | Winston Duke | | | | |
| Matt Murdock Daredevil | Charlie Cox | Charlie Cox | | | Charlie Cox |
| Elektra Natchios | | Élodie Yung | | | |
| Nebula | Karen Gillan | Karen Gillan | | | Karen Gillan |
| Foggy Nelson | | Elden Henson | | | |
| Okoye | Danai Gurira | | | | Danai Gurira Kenna Ramsey |
| Karen Page | | Deborah Ann Woll | | | |
| May Parker | Marisa Tomei | | | | Kari Wahlgren |
| Peter Parker Spider-Man | Tom Holland | | | Tom Holland | Hudson Thames |
| Pepper Potts | Gwyneth Paltrow | | | | Beth Hoyt |
| Hank Pym | Michael Douglas | | | | Michael Douglas |
| Peter Quill Star-Lord | Chris Pratt | Chris Pratt | | | Brian T. Delaney |
| Monica Rambeau | Akira Akbar Teyonah Parris | Teyonah Parris | | | Teyonah Parris |
| Ramonda | Angela Bassett | | | | Angela Bassett |
| Danny Rand Iron Fist | | Finn Jones | | | |
| James Rhodes War Machine / Iron Patriot | Terrence Howard Don Cheadle | Don Cheadle | | | Don Cheadle |
| Reed Richards Mister Fantastic | Pedro Pascal | | | | |
| Rocket | Bradley Cooper^{V} | Bradley Cooper^{V} | Bradley Cooper^{V} | | |
| Steve Rogers Captain America | Chris Evans | | | | Josh Keaton |
| Natasha Romanoff Black Widow | Scarlett Johansson | | | | Lake Bell |
| Everett K. Ross | Martin Freeman | Martin Freeman | | | |
| Thaddeus Ross Red Hulk | William Hurt Harrison Ford | | | | Mike McGill Travis Willingham |
| Erik Selvig | Stellan Skarsgård | | | | |
| Alexei Shostakov Red Guardian | David Harbour | | | | David Harbour |
| Shuri Black Panther | Letitia Wright | | | | Ozioma Akagha |
| Trevor Slattery | Ben Kingsley | Ben Kingsley | Ben Kingsley | | |
| Howard Stark | Gerard Sanders^{P} John Slattery Dominic Cooper | Dominic Cooper | Dominic Cooper | | Dominic Cooper John Slattery |
| Tony Stark Iron Man | Robert Downey Jr. | | | | Mick Wingert |
| Ava Starr Ghost | Hannah John-Kamen | | | | |
| Johnny Storm Human Torch | Joseph Quinn | | | | |
| Susan Storm Invisible Woman | Vanessa Kirby | | | | |
| Dr. Stephen Strange | Benedict Cumberbatch | | | | Benedict Cumberbatch Robin Atkin Downes |
| Talos | Ben Mendelsohn | Ben Mendelsohn | | | |
| T'Challa Black Panther | Chadwick Boseman | | | | Chadwick Boseman |
| Claire Temple | Rosario Dawson | Rosario Dawson | | | |
| Thor | Chris Hemsworth | | Chris Hemsworth | | Chris Hemsworth Greg Furman |
| Joaquin Torres Falcon | Danny Ramirez | Danny Ramirez | | | |
| Ultron | James Spader Ross Marquand^{V} | James Spader | | | Ross Marquand |
| Valkyrie | Tessa Thompson | | | | Tessa Thompson |
| Vision | Paul Bettany | Paul Bettany | | | Paul Bettany |
| John Walker Captain America / U.S. Agent | Wyatt Russell | Wyatt Russell | | | Wyatt Russell |
| Riri Williams Ironheart | Dominique Thorne | Dominique Thorne | | | Dominique Thorne |
| Sam Wilson Falcon / Captain America | Anthony Mackie | Anthony Mackie | | | Anthony Mackie |
| Colleen Wing | | Jessica Henwick | | | |
| Wong | Benedict Wong | Benedict Wong | | | Benedict Wong David Chen |
| Jimmy Woo | Randall Park | Randall Park | | | Randall Park |
| Xu Shang-Chi | Simu Liu | | | | Simu Liu |
| Helmut Zemo | Daniel Brühl | Daniel Brühl | | | Rama Vallury |

== Fictional universe ==
=== Timeline ===
The following diagram represents the Marvel Cinematic Universe timeline for media released by Marvel Studios as well as the Netflix series by Marvel Television. Its placement is meant to represent when the majority of the project occurs. Loki and What If...? are excluded from the diagram because they occur outside of the main timeline with no set timeframe. Werewolf by Night is also excluded given the special explicitly does not indicate where it takes place in the MCU. Disney+'s timeline order places the first seasons of Loki and What If...? between Avengers: Endgame and WandaVision, their second seasons after The Marvels, and Werewolf by Night after Thor: Love and Thunder; Werewolf by Night is also placed here in The Marvel Cinematic Universe: An Official Timeline.

Key:
- Occurs on the MCU's Sacred Timeline
- Occurs outside the MCU's Sacred Timeline at a set timeframe

Marvel Cinematic Universe timeline (as of VisionQuest)
| 1260 BC | Eyes of Wakanda ep. 1 |
| 1259 BC–1201 BC | |
| 1200 BC | Eyes of Wakanda ep. 2 |
| 1199 BC–1399 | |
| 1400 | Eyes of Wakanda ep. 3 |
| 1401–1895 | |
| 1896 | Eyes of Wakanda ep. 4 |
| 1897–1942 | |
| 1943–1945 | The First Avenger |
| 1946 | Agent Carter |
| 1947–1963 | |
| 1964 | The Fantastic Four: First Steps (Note: The Fantastic Four: First Steps takes place on Earth-828 in 1964.) |
| 1965–1994 | |
| 1995 | Captain Marvel |
| 1996–2009 | |
| 2010 | Iron Man |
| 2011 | Iron Man 2 |
| 2011 | The Incredible Hulk |
| 2011 | A Funny Thing... |
| 2011 | Thor |
| 2011 | The Consultant |
| 2012 | The Avengers |
| 2012 | Item 47 |
| 2013 | The Dark World |
| 2013 | Iron Man 3 |
| 2014 | All Hail the King |
| 2014 | The Winter Soldier |
| 2014 | Guardians of the Galaxy |
| 2014 | I Am Groot ep. 1 |
| 2014 | Guardians of the Galaxy Vol. 2 |
| 2014 | I Am Groot eps. 2–10 |
| 2015 | Daredevil season 1 |
| 2015 | Jessica Jones season 1 |
| 2015 | Age of Ultron |
| 2015 | Ant-Man |
| 2015 | Daredevil season 2 |
| 2015 | Luke Cage season 1 |
| 2016 | Iron Fist season 1 |
| 2016 | The Defenders |
| 2016 | Civil War |
| 2016 | Your Friendly Neighborhood; Spider-Man season 1 (Note: Your Friendly Neighborhood Spider-Man season 1 takes place on Earth-86445 around the events of Civil War.) |
| 2016 | Black Widow |
| 2016 | Black Panther |
| 2016 | Homecoming |
| 2016 | The Punisher season 1 |
| 2016–2017 | Doctor Strange |
| 2017 | Jessica Jones season 2 |
| 2017 | Luke Cage season 2 |
| 2017 | Iron Fist season 2 |
| 2017 | Daredevil season 3 |
| 2017 | Ragnarok |
| 2018 | The Punisher season 2 |
| 2018 | Jessica Jones season 3 |
| 2018 | Ant-Man and the Wasp |
| 2018 | Infinity War |
| 2019–2022 | |
| 2023 | Endgame |
| 2023 | Marvel Zombies season 1 (Note: Marvel Zombies takes place on the alternate reality from the What If...? episode "What If... Zombies?!" (2021).) |
| 2023 | WandaVision |
| 2024 | Deadpool & Wolverine (Note: Deadpool & Wolverine takes place on Earth-10005 and in the Void; it occurs after the events of Loki season 2.) |
| 2024 | Shang-Chi |
| 2024 | The Falcon and the Winter Soldier |
| 2024 | Far From Home |
| 2024 | Eternals |
| 2024 | No Way Home |
| 2024 | Multiverse of Madness |
| 2024 | Hawkeye |
| 2025 | Moon Knight |
| 2025 | Wakanda Forever |
| 2025 | Echo |
| 2025 | She-Hulk |
| 2025 | Ms. Marvel |
| 2025 | Love and Thunder |
| 2025 | Ironheart |
| 2025 | The Guardians of the Galaxy; Holiday Special |
| 2025–2027 | Wonder Man |
| 2026 | Quantumania |
| 2026 | Guardians of the Galaxy Vol. 3 |
| 2026 | Secret Invasion |
| 2026 | The Marvels |
| 2026 | Agatha All Along |
| 2026 | Born Again season 1 ep. 1 |
| 2027 | Born Again season 1 eps. 2–9 |
| 2027 | Brave New World |
| 2027 | Thunderbolts* |
| 2027 | Born Again season 2 |
| 2027 | The Punisher: One Last Kill |
| 2028 | Brand New Day |
| 2028 | VisionQuest |

=== Features and in-universe elements ===
- "Avengers assemble" scene
- The Blip
- Infinity Stones
- Iron Man's armor
- Multiverse
- Teams and organizations
  - Avengers
  - Ten Rings
- Species and races

== Inspired media ==
=== Docuseries ===
==== Marvel Studios: Legends ====
Clip show in the Marvel Cinematic Universe
| Season | Phase covered | Episodes | Originally released | | |
| Season | Phase covered | Episodes | First released | Last released | Network |
|---|---|---|---|---|---|
| 1 | Four | 26 | January 8, 2021 | November 23, 2022 | Disney+ |
| 2 | Five | 21 | February 10, 2023 | December 15, 2023 | Disney+ |
| 2 | Five | 21 | June 13, 2025 | | YouTube |
| 3 | Six | 2 | July 29, 2025 | TBA | YouTube |

==== Marvel Studios: Assembled ====
Documentary specials in the Marvel Cinematic Universe
| Phase | Specials | Originally released | |
| Phase | Specials | First released | Last released |
|---|---|---|---|
| Four | 14 | March 12, 2021 | February 8, 2023 |
| Five | 9 | July 19, 2023 | November 13, 2024 |

=== Shorts and television episodes ===
- "Bart the Bad Guy" (2020)
- The Good, the Bart, and the Loki (2021)
- Deadpool and Korg React (2021)

=== Theme park attractions ===
- Avengers Campus
  - Iron Man Experience
  - Guardians of the Galaxy – Mission: Breakout!
  - Ant-Man and The Wasp: Nano Battle!
  - Web Slingers: A Spider-Man Adventure
  - Iron Man roller coaster
  - Avengers Assemble: Flight Force
  - Avengers Infinity Defense
- Guardians of the Galaxy: Cosmic Rewind
- Rogers: The Musical

=== Tie-in video games ===
Video games of the Marvel Cinematic Universe
| Title | U.S. release date | Publisher | Developer | Platforms |
|---|---|---|---|---|
| Iron Man | May 2, 2008 | Sega | Secret Level Artificial Mind and Movement Hands-On Mobile | PlayStation 3 and Xbox 360 PlayStation 2, Wii, Microsoft Windows, Nintendo DS, and PlayStation Portable Various mobile devices |
| The Incredible Hulk | June 5, 2008 | Sega | Edge of Reality Amaze Entertainment Hands-On Mobile | PlayStation 2, PlayStation 3, Xbox 360, Microsoft Windows, and Wii Nintendo DS (version) Various mobile devices |
| Iron Man 2 | May 4, 2010 | Sega | Sega Studios San Francisco High Voltage Software Griptonite Games | PlayStation 3 and Xbox 360 Wii and PlayStation Portable Nintendo DS |
| Iron Man 2 | May 4, 2010 | Gameloft | | iOS and BlackBerry |
| Thor: God of Thunder | May 3, 2011 | Sega | Liquid Entertainment Red Fly Studio WayForward Technologies | PlayStation 3 and Xbox 360 Wii and Nintendo 3DS Nintendo DS |
| Captain America: Super Soldier | July 19, 2011 | Sega | Next Level Games High Voltage Software Graphite Games | PlayStation 3 and Xbox 360 Wii and Nintendo 3DS Nintendo DS |
| The Avengers: The Mobile Game | May 2, 2012 | Gameloft | | iOS, Android, and Blackberry |
| Iron Man 3: The Official Game | April 25, 2013 | Gameloft | | iOS and Android |
| Thor: The Dark World – The Official Game | October 31, 2013 | Gameloft | | iOS and Android |
| Captain America: The Winter Soldier – The Official Game | March 27, 2014 | Gameloft | | iOS, Android, and Windows Phone |
| Lego Marvel's Avengers | January 26, 2016 | Warner Bros. Interactive; Entertainment | TT Games | PlayStation 4, Xbox One, Microsoft Windows, PlayStation 3, Xbox 360, Wii U, Nintendo 3DS, and PlayStation Vita |
| Lego Marvel's Avengers | March 10, 2016 | Feral Interactive | TT Games | macOS |
| Spider-Man: Homecoming – Virtual Reality Experience | June 30, 2017 | Sony Pictures; Virtual Reality | CreateVR | PlayStation VR, HTC Vive, and Oculus Rift |
| Spider-Man: Far From Home – Virtual Reality Experience | June 25, 2019 | Sony Pictures; Virtual Reality | CreateVR | PlayStation VR, HTC Vive, and Oculus Rift |
| What If...? – An Immersive Story | May 30, 2024 | Apple | ILM Immersive | Apple Vision Pro |

== Reception and accolades ==
- List of accolades received by Marvel Cinematic Universe films
  - List of accolades received by Iron Man
  - List of accolades received by The Avengers
  - List of accolades received by Guardians of the Galaxy
  - List of accolades received by Black Panther
  - List of accolades received by Avengers: Infinity War
  - List of accolades received by Avengers: Endgame
  - List of accolades received by Spider-Man: No Way Home
  - List of accolades received by Black Panther: Wakanda Forever
- List of accolades received by Marvel Cinematic Universe television series
  - List of accolades received by WandaVision
  - List of accolades received by Loki
- List of box office records set by Avengers: Infinity War
- List of box office records set by Avengers: Endgame
