= WHIH Newsfront =

Faux news web series

- Genre: Fiction; News program
- Presented by: Leslie Bibb; Al Madrigal
- Country of origin: United States
- Original language: English
- No. of episodes: 10

Production
- Production company: Marvel Studios

Original release
- Network: YouTube
- Release: July 2, 2015 – May 3, 2016

WHIH Newsfront is a faux American current affairs web series serving as the center of several viral marketing campaigns for Marvel Studios. Based on the fictional television network WHIH World News that appears throughout the Marvel Cinematic Universe (MCU), the YouTube videos began as marketing for the film Ant-Man, and deal with major events depicted in the MCU's films and television series. The videos were created by Marvel Studios in partnership with Google.

The news program features Leslie Bibb as Christine Everhart, reprising her role from the MCU films, with Al Madrigal portraying political correspondent Will Adams. Several other actors reprise their roles from the films, while archival footage of others is also used. The initial videos were released during July 2015, focusing on the immediate aftermath of Avengers: Age of Ultron, while leading up to the events of Ant-Man. More were released beginning in April 2016, as a WHIH Newsfront Special Report, focusing on the Avengers and the political issues surrounding them, as part of a similar viral marketing campaign for the film Captain America: Civil War.

The videos are accompanied by additional marketing materials, such as in-universe web articles and social media posts. The series has been received positively, seen as better than average viral marketing campaigns, and as a fun and insightful expansion of the MCU for fans of the franchise.

== Videos ==
=== Ant-Man campaign (2015) ===
No. overall	No. in campaign	Title	Guest(s)	Original release date	Runtime
1	1	"WHIH Newsfront Promo"	None	July 2, 2015	0:28
Christine Everhart runs down the upcoming week's main stories.
2	2	"WHIH Newsfront Top Stories"	None	July 7, 2015	1:20
Christine Everhart discusses the ongoing relief efforts in Sokovia, (Note: As depicted in Avengers: Age of Ultron (2015).) and the upcoming release of corporate criminal Scott Lang. (Note: As depicted in Ant-Man (2015).)
3	3	"WHIH EXCLUSIVE: 2012 VistaCorp break-in security footage involving cyber-criminal Scott Lang"	None	July 11, 2015	1:48
Security footage featuring Lang's VistaCorp break in, for which he was arrested and imprisoned.
4	4	"WIRED Insider Interviews Darren Cross, CEO of Pym Technologies"	Corey Stoll as Darren Cross	July 13, 2015	2:36
An interview with Pym Technologies CEO Darren Cross, concerning the future of his company.
5	5	"WHIH EXCLUSIVE: Scott Lang Interview"	Paul Rudd as Scott Lang	July 16, 2015	3:23
Christine Everhart interviews Scott Lang via video from San Quentin Prison ahead of his release.

=== Captain America: Civil War campaign (2016) ===
No. overall	No. in campaign	Title	Guest(s)	Original release date	Runtime
6	1	"AVENGERS IMPACT: A WHIH Newsfront Special Report"	None	April 22, 2016	2:22
Christine Everhart and political correspondent Will Adams discuss the Avengers and whether they require governmental oversight to prevent further collateral damage.
7	2	"WHIH Newsfront: The Cost of Saving the World"	None	April 26, 2016	1:41
Christine Everhart and Will Adams discuss whether the Avengers or taxpayers should pay for damages caused by the Avengers' saving the world, an issue upon which public response is divided.
8	3	"WHIH Newsfront: The Avengers and The White House"	None	April 28, 2016	3:12
Christine Everhart and Will Adams discuss President Matthew Ellis's stance on the Avengers, and the increasing political activity of Thaddeus Ross following his retirement from the military.
9	4	"WHIH Newsfront Exclusive: President Ellis Discusses the Avengers"	William Sadler as Matthew Ellis	May 3, 2016	3:14
Christine Everhart and Will Adams interview President Matthew Ellis about his decision to nominate Thaddeus Ross for the position of United States Secretary of State, and about his stance on the Avengers.
10	5	"WHIH Breaking News: Attack in Lagos"	William Sadler as Matthew Ellis	May 3, 2016	3:06
Christine Everhart and Will Adams go live with breaking news of an attack in Lagos, (Note: As depicted in Captain America: Civil War (2016).) and cross to the President's live statement on the situation.

== Cast and characters ==
- Leslie Bibb as Christine Everhart: The WHIH Newsfront presenter. Bibb reprises her role from the Iron Man films.
- Al Madrigal as Will Adams: WHIH Newsfront's political correspondent.

Also reprising his role from the films is William Sadler as President of the United States, Matthew Ellis, while Paul Rudd and Corey Stoll as Scott Lang and Darren Cross, respectively, appear before their appearances in Ant-Man. Additionally, WIRED Insider presenter James Rondell appears as himself, and a WHIH reporter based on the character Jackson Norris briefly appears; the latter is a separate character from the similarly named Jackson Norriss, who appears in the Marvel One-Shot short film All Hail the King portrayed by Scoot McNairy.

== Production ==
In June 2015, Leslie Bibb revealed that she was involved in a new project for Marvel Studios, reprising her role of Christine Everhart from Iron Man and Iron Man 2. The next week, the project was revealed to be part of a viral marketing campaign for the Marvel film Ant-Man with the reveal of a faux news program, WHIH Newsfront with Christine Everhart, an extension of the fictional television network WHIH World News which is depicted reporting on major events in many MCU films and television series.

Bibb returned as Everhart, and was joined by Al Madrigal as WHIH political correspondent Will Adams, for a WHIH Newsfront Special Report as part of a similar campaign in April 2016 in the lead up to the film Captain America: Civil War. The report focuses on the opposing sides of Civil War's central conflict, with Everhart supporting governmental oversight and accountability for superheroes, and Adams willing to let the Avengers do what is necessary to save the world. The opinion of the MCU public is also depicted as divided between the two sides.

Marvel partnered with Google to produce the videos, which deal with the aftermath of Avengers: Age of Ultron, and the buildup to Ant-Man and Captain America: Civil War, while featuring numerous easter eggs to the MCU, including a news ticker that mentions MCU characters and events such as Jane Foster, the death of Wolfgang von Strucker, and Dr. Stephen Strange. In addition to archive footage from the films, the videos also use original material and "footage showing what these fights and their aftermaths look [like] from the civilian perspective". Jeremy Adams was one of the videos' writers.

== Release ==
The videos were made available on the WHIH World News' YouTube channel, with some of them debuting in publications such as Mashable, BuzzFeed, and WIRED Insider. The Ant-Man campaign videos also appear as bonus features on that film's Blu-ray release.

=== Supplementary material ===
Other content released for the viral marketing campaigns include ongoing posts on social media sites such as Twitter and Google+, as well as a full-length piece on Mashable, attributed to Everhart, that serves as a companion to the videos. More focus was placed on social media for the 2016 return, with tweets released to celebrate Earth Day, with reference to Stark Industries and Pepper Potts, and to mark the end of the clean up of Washington, D.C. following the events of Captain America: The Winter Soldier, with quotes from MCU politicians such as President Ellis used.

== Reception ==
Oliver Lyttelton of IndieWire called the campaign, "one of the cannier bits of marketing that Marvel have come up with", saying that "it's not particularly funny, but fans will definitely enjoy it." CinemaBlend's Adam Holmes noted how the videos were able to give insight to the rest of the MCU and its population's perception of the films' events. Matthew Mueller at ComicBook.com said, "As far as viral marketing goes, this is definitely one of the more well-produced campaigns," and noted, "In our 24-hour news cycle, the smallest abnormal occurrence can spawn countless hours of coverage....so it stands to reason that multiple superhero related catastrophes would also warrant that kind of coverage."

Alanna Smith, writing for Geek Chic Elite, stated, "When I found out about this channel I couldn't help but laugh out of disbelief and awe towards the Marvel team. I mean come on, real online broadcasts of the news channel that it turns out has been there from the start, and it's hosted by the same side character (whom we probably didn't even think would be back) from the startup MCU film made 7 years ago? When Marvel says "It's All Connected" they don't mess around; they really mean everything." Sean K. Cureton of Screen Rant found the videos to be "in keeping with the willingness on the part of Marvel Studios to poke fun at some of the more vocal complaints frequently raised against the action-centric nature of the MCU, and the entire superhero film genre by default. At the same time, in incorporating the real world dialogue regarding the ridiculous levels of structural damage inflicted on various metropolitan settings, [the franchise] sets itself apart through a coy flirtation in engaging the discussion."
