= List of accolades received by Loki (TV series) =

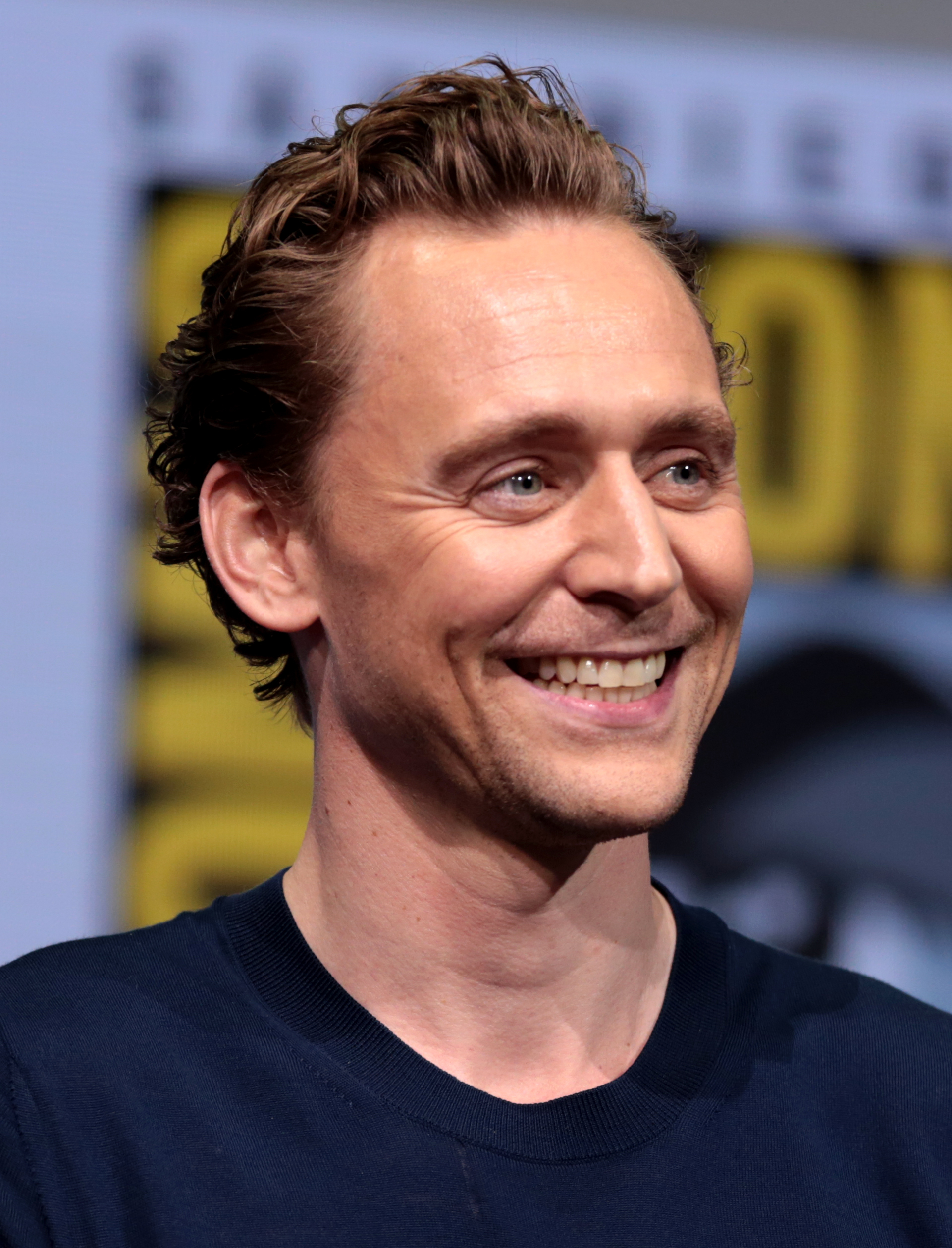
- Tom Hiddleston received the most acting nominations for Loki.
Accolades
Award	Wins	Nominations
Art Directors Guild Awards	1	2
ASCAP Composers' Choice Awards	0	2
Astra TV Awards	0	7
Black Reel TV Awards	0	3
British Academy Television Craft Awards	0	2
Costume Designers Guild Awards	0	3
Critics' Choice Super Awards	1	9
Critics' Choice Television Awards	0	4
Dorian Awards	0	1
Dragon Awards	0	1
Harvey Awards	0	1
Hollywood Critics Association TV Awards	0	6
Hollywood Music in Media Awards	0	2
Hollywood Professional Association Awards	0	3
Hugo Awards	0	2
International Film Music Critics Association Awards	0	1
MPSE Golden Reel Awards	0	3
MTV Movie & TV Awards	2	3
Nebula Awards	0	1
Nickelodeon Kids' Choice Awards	1	4
People's Choice Awards	3	6
Primetime Creative Arts Emmy Awards	0	9
Saturn Awards	1	6
Screen Actors Guild Awards	0	1
Set Decorators Society of America Awards	0	2
Society of Composers & Lyricists	0	2
Visual Effects Society Awards	1	7
World Soundtrack Awards	1	2
Writers Guild of America Awards	0	2

Totals (Note: Certain award groups do not simply award one winner. They acknowledge several different recipients, have runners-up, and have third place. Since this is a specific recognition and is different from losing an award, runner-up mentions are considered wins in this award tally. For simplification and to avoid errors, each award in this list has been presumed to have had a prior nomination.)
- Wins: 11
- Nominations: 96

Loki is an American television series created by Michael Waldron for the streaming service Disney+, based on Marvel Comics featuring the character of the same name. It is the third television series in the Marvel Cinematic Universe (MCU) produced by Marvel Studios, sharing continuity with the films of the franchise. Waldron served as head writer and Kate Herron directed the first season, with Eric Martin and the duo Justin Benson and Aaron Moorhead serving as head writer and leading the directing team for the second season, respectively. Tom Hiddleston reprises his role as Loki from the film series, starring alongside Gugu Mbatha-Raw, Wunmi Mosaku, Eugene Cordero, Tara Strong, Owen Wilson, Sophia Di Martino, Jonathan Majors, and Neil Ellice. Sasha Lane, Jack Veal, DeObia Oparei, and Richard E. Grant also star in the first season, with Rafael Casal, Kate Dickie, Liz Carr, Ke Huy Quan and Richard Dixon joining for the second. The series takes place after the events of the film Avengers: Endgame (2019), in which an alternate version of Loki created a new timeline.

Loki premiered on June 9, 2021. Its first season, consisting of six episodes, concluded on July 14 and is part of Phase Four of the MCU. The second season, also consisting of six episodes, ran from October 5 to November 9, 2023, as part of Phase Five. The series garnered numerous awards and nominations, including nine Primetime Creative Arts Emmy Awards nominations. From major guilds, it was nominated for two Art Directors Guild Awards, three Costume Designers Guild Awards, a Screen Actors Guild Award, and two Writers Guild of America Awards. Loki was nominated for four Critics' Choice Television Awards and in genre awards, two Hugo Awards, a Harvey Award, and a Dragon Award. The series also won one Critics' Choice Super Award and one Saturn Award.

== Accolades ==
Accolades
Award	Date(s) of ceremony	Category	Recipient(s)	Result	Ref.
Art Directors Guild Awards	March 5, 2022	Excellence in Production Design for a One-Hour Period or Fantasy Single-Camera Series	Kasra Farahani (for "Glorious Purpose")	Won	
Art Directors Guild Awards	February 10, 2024	One-Hour Fantasy Single-Camera Series	Kasra Farahani (for "Ouroboros")	Nominated	
ASCAP Composers' Choice Awards	May 2, 2022	Television Score of the Year	Natalie Holt	Nominated	
ASCAP Composers' Choice Awards	May 2, 2022	Television Theme of the Year	Natalie Holt	Nominated	
Astra TV Awards	December 8, 2024	Best Streaming Drama Series	Loki	Nominated	
Astra TV Awards	December 8, 2024	Best Actor in a Streaming Drama Series	Tom Hiddleston	Nominated	
Astra TV Awards	December 8, 2024	Best Supporting Actor in a Streaming Drama Series	Ke Huy Quan	Nominated	
Astra TV Awards	December 8, 2024	Best Supporting Actor in a Streaming Drama Series	Owen Wilson	Nominated	
Astra TV Awards	December 8, 2024	Best Supporting Actress in a Streaming Drama Series	Gugu Mbatha-Raw	Nominated	
Astra TV Awards	December 8, 2024	Best Directing in a Streaming Drama Series	Justin Benson & Aaron Moorhead (for "Science/Fiction")	Nominated	
Astra TV Awards	December 8, 2024	Best Writing in a Streaming Drama Series	Eric Martin (for "Glorious Purpose")	Nominated	
Black Reel TV Awards	February 28, 2022	Outstanding Guest Actor, Drama Series	Jonathan Majors	Nominated	
Black Reel TV Awards	August 13, 2024	Outstanding Supporting Performance in a Drama Series	Gugu Mbatha-Raw	Nominated	
Black Reel TV Awards	August 13, 2024	Outstanding Supporting Performance in a Drama Series	Wunmi Mosaku	Nominated	
British Academy Television Craft Awards	April 24, 2022	Best Original Music	Natalie Holt	Nominated	
British Academy Television Craft Awards	April 28, 2024	Best Original Music: Fiction	Natalie Holt	Nominated	
Costume Designers Guild Awards	March 9, 2022	Excellence in Sci-Fi/Fantasy Television	Christine Wada (for "Journey into Mystery")	Nominated	
Costume Designers Guild Awards	February 21, 2024	Excellence in Sci-Fi/Fantasy Television	Christine Wada (for "1893")	Nominated	
Costume Designers Guild Awards	February 21, 2024	Excellence in Costume Illustration	Felipe Sanchez (for "1893")	Nominated	
Critics' Choice Super Awards	March 17, 2022	Best Superhero Series	Loki	Nominated	
Critics' Choice Super Awards	March 17, 2022	Best Actor in a Superhero Series	Tom Hiddleston	Won	
Critics' Choice Super Awards	March 17, 2022	Best Actress in a Superhero Series	Sophia Di Martino	Nominated	
Critics' Choice Super Awards	March 17, 2022	Best Actress in a Superhero Series	Gugu Mbatha-Raw	Nominated	
Critics' Choice Super Awards	March 17, 2022	Best Villain in a Series	Jonathan Majors	Nominated	
Critics' Choice Super Awards	April 4, 2024	Best Superhero Series	Loki	Nominated	
Critics' Choice Super Awards	April 4, 2024	Best Actor in a Superhero Series	Tom Hiddleston	Nominated	
Critics' Choice Super Awards	April 4, 2024	Best Actor in a Superhero Series	Ke Huy Quan	Nominated	
Critics' Choice Super Awards	April 4, 2024	Best Actress in a Superhero Series	Sophia Di Martino	Nominated	
Critics' Choice Television Awards	January 14, 2024	Best Drama Series	Loki	Nominated	
Critics' Choice Television Awards	January 14, 2024	Best Actor in a Drama Series	Tom Hiddleston	Nominated	
Critics' Choice Television Awards	January 14, 2024	Best Supporting Actor in a Drama Series	Ke Huy Quan	Nominated	
Critics' Choice Television Awards	January 14, 2024	Best Supporting Actress in a Drama Series	Sophia Di Martino	Nominated	
Dorian Awards	August 17, 2022	Most Visually Striking Show	Loki	Nominated	
Dragon Awards	September 5, 2021	Best Science Fiction or Fantasy TV Series	Loki	Nominated	
Harvey Awards	October 8, 2021	Best Adaptation from Comic Book/Graphic Novel	Loki	Nominated	
Hollywood Critics Association TV Awards	August 14, 2022	Best Streaming Series, Drama	Loki	Nominated	
Hollywood Critics Association TV Awards	August 14, 2022	Best Actor in a Streaming Series, Drama	Tom Hiddleston	Nominated	
Hollywood Critics Association TV Awards	August 14, 2022	Best Supporting Actress in a Streaming Series, Drama	Sophia Di Martino	Nominated	
Hollywood Critics Association TV Awards	August 14, 2022	Best Supporting Actor in a Streaming Series, Drama	Owen Wilson	Nominated	
Hollywood Critics Association TV Awards	August 14, 2022	Best Writing in a Streaming Series, Drama	Michael Waldron (for "Glorious Purpose")	Nominated	
Hollywood Critics Association TV Awards	August 14, 2022	Best Directing in a Streaming Series, Drama	Kate Herron (for "Journey into Mystery")	Nominated	
Hollywood Music in Media Awards	November 17, 2021	Score – TV Show/Limited Series	Natalie Holt	Nominated	
Hollywood Music in Media Awards	November 15, 2023	Score – TV Show/Limited Series	Natalie Holt	Nominated	
Hollywood Professional Association Awards	November 18, 2021	Outstanding Visual Effects – Episodic (Under 13 Episodes) or Non-theatrical Feature	Dan DeLeeuw, David Seager, Alexandra Greene, George Kuruvilla, Dan Mayer (for "Journey into Mystery")	Nominated	
Hollywood Professional Association Awards	November 7, 2024	Outstanding Color Grading – Live Action Episode or Non-Theatrical Feature	Matt Watson (for "Glorious Purpose")	Nominated	
Hollywood Professional Association Awards	November 7, 2024	Outstanding Visual Effects – Live Action Episode or Series Season	Steve Moncur, Christian Waite, Jeremy Sawyer, Ben Aickin, Pieter Warmington	Nominated	
Hugo Awards	September 4, 2022	Best Dramatic Presentation, Short Form	Eric Martin, Kate Herron, Michael Waldron (for "The Nexus Event")	Nominated	
Hugo Awards	August 11, 2024	Best Dramatic Presentation, Short Form	Eric Martin, Justin Benson and Aaron Moorhead (for "Glorious Purpose")	Nominated	
International Film Music Critics Association Awards	February 17, 2022	Best Original Score For Television	Natalie Holt	Nominated	
MPSE Golden Reel Awards	March 13, 2022	Outstanding Achievement in Sound Editing – Limited Series or Anthology	Various (Note: David Acord, Matthew Wood, Kirsten Mate, Adam Kopald, Steve Slanec, Brad Semenoff, David Farmer, Joel Raabe, Shelley Roden, John Roesch, Anele Onyekwere, Nashia Wachsman, Ed Hamilton) (for "Journey into Mystery")	Nominated	
MPSE Golden Reel Awards	March 3, 2024	Outstanding Achievement in Sound Editing – Broadcast Long Form Effects and Foley	Bjørn Ole Schroeder, David Chrastka, Andre Zweers, Malcolm Fife, Jamey Scott, Alyssa Nevarez, Dawit Zemene, Sandra Fox (for "Glorious Purpose")	Nominated	
MPSE Golden Reel Awards	March 3, 2024	Outstanding Achievement in Music Editing – Broadcast Long Form	Anele Onyekwere, Nashia Wachsman, Richard Armstrong, Ed Hamilton (for "Glorious Purpose")	Nominated	
MTV Movie & TV Awards	June 5, 2022	Best Show	Loki	Nominated	
MTV Movie & TV Awards	June 5, 2022	Breakthrough Performance	Sophia Di Martino	Won	
MTV Movie & TV Awards	June 5, 2022	Best Team	Tom Hiddleston, Sophia Di Martino and Owen Wilson	Won	
Nebula Awards	May 21, 2022	Ray Bradbury Nebula Award for Outstanding Dramatic Presentation	Bisha K. Ali, Elissa Karasik, Eric Martin, Michael Waldron, Tom Kauffman, Jess Dweck	Nominated	
Nickelodeon Kids' Choice Awards	April 9, 2022	Favorite Family TV Show	Loki	Nominated	
Nickelodeon Kids' Choice Awards	April 9, 2022	Favorite Male TV Star (Family)	Tom Hiddleston	Won	
Nickelodeon Kids' Choice Awards	July 13, 2024	Favorite Family TV Show	Loki	Nominated	
Nickelodeon Kids' Choice Awards	July 13, 2024	Favorite Male TV Star (Family)	Tom Hiddleston	Nominated	
People's Choice Awards	December 7, 2021	Show of 2021	Loki	Won	
People's Choice Awards	December 7, 2021	Male TV Star of 2021	Tom Hiddleston	Won	
People's Choice Awards	December 7, 2021	Bingeworthy Show of 2021	Loki	Nominated	
People's Choice Awards	December 7, 2021	Sci-Fi/Fantasy Show of 2021	Loki	Nominated	
People's Choice Awards	February 18, 2024	Sci-Fi/Fantasy Show of the Year	Loki	Won	
People's Choice Awards	February 18, 2024	Male TV Star of the Year	Tom Hiddleston	Nominated	
Primetime Creative Arts Emmy Awards	September 3–4, 2022	Outstanding Production Design for a Narrative Contemporary Program (One Hour or More)	Kasra Farahani, Natasha Gerasimova, and Claudia Bonfe (for "Glorious Purpose")	Nominated	
Primetime Creative Arts Emmy Awards	September 3–4, 2022	Outstanding Cinematography for a Single-Camera Series (One Hour)	Autumn Durald Arkapaw (for "Lamentis")	Nominated	
Primetime Creative Arts Emmy Awards	September 3–4, 2022	Outstanding Fantasy/Sci-Fi Costumes	Christine Wada, Nora Pederson, Tamsin Costello, and Carol Beadle (for "Glorious Purpose")	Nominated	
Primetime Creative Arts Emmy Awards	September 3–4, 2022	Outstanding Music Composition for a Series (Original Dramatic Score)	Natalie Holt (for "Glorious Purpose")	Nominated	
Primetime Creative Arts Emmy Awards	September 3–4, 2022	Outstanding Original Main Title Theme Music	Natalie Holt	Nominated	
Primetime Creative Arts Emmy Awards	September 3–4, 2022	Outstanding Sound Editing for a Comedy or Drama Series (One-Hour)	Various (Note: Matthew Wood, David Acord, Brad Semenoff, Steve Slanec, Kyrsten Mate, Adam Kopald, Joel Raabe, Anele Onyekwere, Ed Hamilton, Nashia Wachsman, Shelley Roden, and John Roesch) (for "Journey into Mystery")	Nominated	
Primetime Creative Arts Emmy Awards	September 7–8, 2024	Outstanding Fantasy/Sci-Fi Costumes	Christine Wada, Harriet Kendall, Kristen Ernst-Brown, and Tom Hornsby (for "1893")	Nominated	
Primetime Creative Arts Emmy Awards	September 7–8, 2024	Outstanding Sound Mixing for a Comedy or Drama Series (One-Hour)	Karol Urban and Paul Munro (for "Glorious Purpose")	Nominated	
Primetime Creative Arts Emmy Awards	September 7–8, 2024	Outstanding Special Visual Effects in a Season or a Movie	Christopher Townsend, Allison Paul, Sandra Balej, Matthew Twyford, Christopher Smallfield, John William Van der pool, Steve Moncur, Julian Hutchens, and Kevin Yuille	Nominated	
Saturn Awards	October 25, 2022	Best Fantasy Series (Streaming)	Loki	Won	
Saturn Awards	October 25, 2022	Best Actor in a Streaming Series	Tom Hiddleston	Nominated	
Saturn Awards	October 25, 2022	Best Guest Performance in a Streaming Series	Jonathan Majors	Nominated	
Saturn Awards	February 4, 2024	Best Television Home Media Release	Season 1 – 4K SteelBook	Nominated	
Saturn Awards	February 2, 2025	Best Superhero Television Series	Loki	Nominated	
Saturn Awards	February 2, 2025	Best Guest Star in a Television Series	Ke Huy Quan	Nominated	
Screen Actors Guild Awards	February 27, 2022	Outstanding Performance by a Stunt Ensemble in a Comedy or Drama Series	Loki	Nominated	
Set Decorators Society of America Awards	August 2, 2022	Best Achievement in Décor/Design of a One Hour Fantasy or Science Fiction Series	Claudia Bonfe and Kasra Farahani	Nominated	
Set Decorators Society of America Awards	August 5, 2024	Best Achievement in Décor/Design of a One Hour Fantasy or Science Fiction Series	Jille Azis and Kasra Farahani	Nominated	
Society of Composers & Lyricists	March 8, 2022	Outstanding Original Score for a Television Production	Natalie Holt	Nominated	
Society of Composers & Lyricists	February 13, 2024	Outstanding Original Score for a Television Production	Natalie Holt	Nominated	
Visual Effects Society	March 8, 2022	Outstanding Visual Effects in a Photoreal Episode	Dan DeLeeuw, Allison Paul, Sandra Balej, David Seager (for "Journey into Mystery")	Nominated	
Visual Effects Society	March 8, 2022	Outstanding Virtual Cinematography in a CG Project	"Race to the Ark" – Jessie Lewis-Evans, Luke Avery, Autumn Durald Arkapaw, Scott Inkster (for "Lamentis")	Nominated	
Visual Effects Society	March 8, 2022	Outstanding Effects Simulations in an Episode, Commercial, or Real-Time Project	"Alioth Cloud" – George Kuruvilla, Menno Dijkstra, Matthew Hanger, Jiyong Shin (for "Journey into Mystery")	Nominated	
Visual Effects Society	March 8, 2022	Outstanding Compositing and Lighting in an Episode	"Shuroo City Destruction" – Paul Chapman, Tom Truscott, Biagio Figliuzzi, Attila Szalma (for "Lamentis")	Won	
Visual Effects Society	February 21, 2024	Outstanding Visual Effects in a Photoreal Episode	Christopher Townsend, Allison Paul, Matthew Twyford, Christopher Smallfield and John William Van Der Pool (for "Glorious Purpose")	Nominated	
Visual Effects Society	February 21, 2024	Outstanding Created Environment in an Episode, Commercial, Game Cinematic or Real-Time Project	Christian Waite, Ben Aickin, Francesco Ferraresi, Pieter Warmington (for "1893")	Nominated	
Visual Effects Society	February 21, 2024	Outstanding Effects Simulations in an Episode, Commercial, Game Cinematic or Real-Time Project	Rafael Camacho, Jonathan Lyddon-Towl, Julien Legay, Benedikt Roettger (for "Science/Fiction")	Nominated	
World Soundtrack Awards	October 23, 2021	TV Composer of the Year	Natalie Holt	Nominated	
World Soundtrack Awards	October 16, 2024	TV Composer of the Year	Natalie Holt	Won	
Writers Guild of America Awards	March 20, 2022	Drama Series	Bisha K. Ali, Elissa Karasik, Eric Martin, Michael Waldron	Nominated	
Writers Guild of America Awards	March 20, 2022	New Series	Bisha K. Ali, Elissa Karasik, Eric Martin, Michael Waldron	Nominated	
