= List of accolades received by Marvel Cinematic Universe television series =

Accolades received by Marvel Cinematic Universe television series
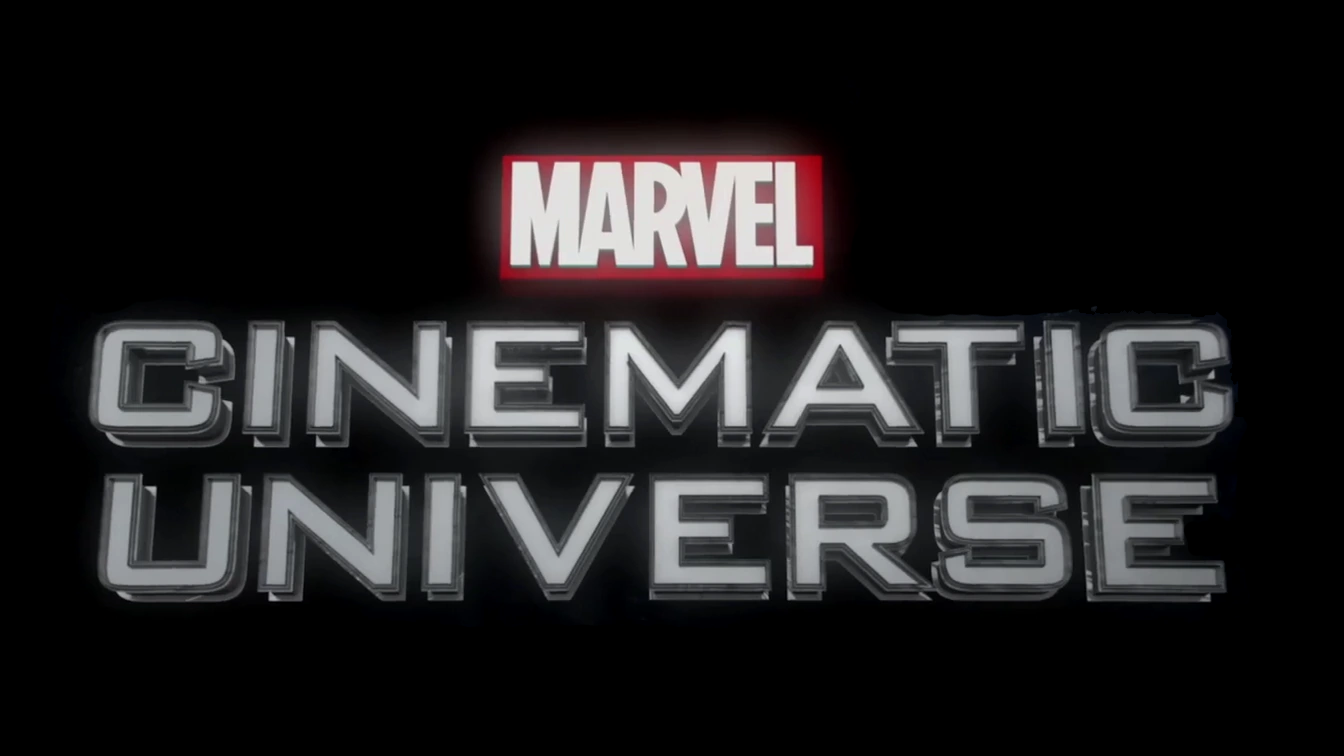
- Marvel Cinematic Universe intertitle from Marvel Studios: Assembling a Universe (2014)
Awards and nominations
Award	Wins	Nominations
Golden Globe Awards	0	3
Critics' Choice Super Awards	4	15
Critics' Choice Television Awards	2	7
MTV Movie & TV Awards	8	14
Primetime Creative Arts Emmy Awards	7	52
Primetime Emmy Awards	0	8
Saturn Awards	7	54
Visual Effects Society Awards	1	16

Totals (Note: Certain award groups do not simply award one winner. They acknowledge several different recipients, have runners-up, and have third place. Since this is a specific recognition and is different from losing an award, runner-up mentions are considered wins in this award tally. For simplification and to avoid errors, each award in this list has been presumed to have had a prior nomination.)
- Wins: 29
- Nominations: 169

The Marvel Cinematic Universe (MCU) is an American media franchise and shared universe centered on a series of superhero films, independently produced by Marvel Studios and based on characters that appear in American comic books published by Marvel Comics. The franchise also includes comic books, short films, television series, and digital series. The shared universe, much like the original Marvel Universe in comic books, was established by crossing over common plot elements, settings, cast, and characters.

The franchise has been nominated for 14 Critics' Choice Super Awards (winning four), among others.

== Critics' Choice Super Awards ==
Awards and nominations received by Marvel Cinematic Universe television series from Critics' Choice Super Awards
Category	Year	Series	Recipient	Result	Ref.
Best Superhero Series	2022	WandaVision	WandaVision	Won	
Best Superhero Series	2022	Hawkeye	Hawkeye	Nominated	
Best Superhero Series	2022	Loki	Loki	Nominated	
Best Superhero Series	2023	Ms. Marvel	Ms. Marvel	Nominated	
Best Superhero Series	2023	She-Hulk: Attorney at Law	She-Hulk: Attorney at Law	Nominated	
Best Superhero Series	2023	Werewolf by Night	Werewolf by Night	Nominated	
Best Superhero Series	2024	Loki	Loki	Nominated	
Best Superhero Series	2025	Agatha All Along	Agatha All Along	Nominated	
Best Superhero Series	2026	Daredevil: Born Again	Daredevil: Born Again	Nominated	
Best Superhero Series	2026	Wonder Man	Wonder Man	Nominated	
Best Actor in a Superhero Series	2022	WandaVision	Paul Bettany	Nominated	
Best Actor in a Superhero Series	2022	Loki	Tom Hiddleston	Won	
Best Actor in a Superhero Series	2022	The Falcon and the Winter Soldier	Anthony Mackie	Nominated	
Best Actor in a Superhero Series	2023	Moon Knight	Oscar Isaac	Nominated	
Best Actor in a Superhero Series	2024	Loki	Tom Hiddleston	Nominated	
Best Actor in a Superhero Series	2024	Loki	Ke Huy Quan	Nominated	
Best Actor in a Superhero Series	2025	Daredevil: Born Again	Charlie Cox	Nominated	
Best Actor in a Superhero Series	2026	Wonder Man	Yahya Abdul-Mateen II	Nominated	
Best Actress in a Superhero Series	2021	Helstrom	Elizabeth Marvel	Nominated	
Best Actress in a Superhero Series	2022	WandaVision	Elizabeth Olsen	Won	
Best Actress in a Superhero Series	2022	WandaVision	Kathryn Hahn	Nominated	
Best Actress in a Superhero Series	2022	Loki	Gugu Mbatha-Raw	Nominated	
Best Actress in a Superhero Series	2022	Loki	Sophia Di Martino	Nominated	
Best Actress in a Superhero Series	2022	Hawkeye	Hailee Steinfeld	Nominated	
Best Actress in a Superhero Series	2023	She-Hulk: Attorney at Law	Tatiana Maslany	Won	
Best Actress in a Superhero Series	2023	Ms. Marvel	Iman Vellani	Nominated	
Best Actress in a Superhero Series	2024	Loki	Sophia Di Martino	Nominated	
Best Actress in a Superhero Series	2025	Agatha All Along	Kathryn Hahn	Nominated	
Best Actress in a Superhero Series	2026	Daredevil: Born Again	Deborah Ann Woll	Nominated	
Best Actress in a Science Fiction/Fantasy Series	2025	Agatha All Along	Kathryn Hahn	Nominated	
Best Villain in a Series	2022	WandaVision	Kathryn Hahn	Won	
Best Villain in a Series	2022	Hawkeye	Vincent D'Onofrio	Nominated	
Best Villain in a Series	2022	Loki	Jonathan Majors	Nominated	
Best Villain in a Series	2023	Moon Knight	Ethan Hawke	Nominated	
Best Villain in a Series	2023	Werewolf by Night	Harriet Sansom Harris	Nominated	
Best Villain in a Series	2025	Daredevil: Born Again	Vincent D'Onofrio	Nominated	

== Critics' Choice Television Awards ==
Awards and nominations received by Marvel Cinematic Universe television series from Critics' Choice Television Awards
Category	Year	Series	Recipient	Result	Ref.
Best Animated Series	2022	What If...?	What If...?	Won	
Best Animated Series	2026	Marvel Zombies	Marvel Zombies	Nominated	
Best Animated Series	2026	Your Friendly Neighborhood Spider-Man	Your Friendly Neighborhood Spider-Man	Nominated	
Best Actor in a Limited Series or Movie Made for Television	2022	WandaVision	Paul Bettany	Nominated	
Best Actor in a Drama Series	2024	Loki	Tom Hiddleston	Nominated	
Best Actress in a Drama Series	2016	Jessica Jones	Krysten Ritter	Nominated	
Best Actress in a Limited Series or Movie Made for Television	2022	WandaVision	Elizabeth Olsen	Nominated	
Best Limited Series	2022	WandaVision	WandaVision	Nominated	
Best Drama Series	2024	Loki	Loki	Nominated	
Best Supporting Actor in a Drama Series	2024	Loki	Ke Huy Quan	Nominated	
Best Supporting Actress in a Drama Series	2024	Loki	Sophia Di Martino	Nominated	
Best Supporting Actress in a Comedy Series	2025	Agatha All Along	Patti LuPone	Nominated	
Best Supporting Actress in a Limited Series or Movie Made for Television	2022	WandaVision	Kathryn Hahn	Nominated	
Most Exciting New Series	2013	Agents of S.H.I.E.L.D.	Agents of S.H.I.E.L.D.	Won	

== Golden Globe Awards ==
Awards and nominations received by Marvel Cinematic Universe television series from Golden Globe Awards
Category	Year	Series	Recipient	Result	Ref.
Best Actress – Miniseries or Television Film	2022	WandaVision	Elizabeth Olsen	Nominated	
Best Actor – Miniseries or Television Film	2022	WandaVision	Paul Bettany	Nominated	
Best Actress – Television Series Musical or Comedy	2025	Agatha All Along	Kathryn Hahn	Nominated	

== MTV Movie & TV Awards ==
Awards and nominations received by Marvel Cinematic Universe television series from MTV Movie & TV Awards
Category	Year	Series	Recipient(s)	Result	Ref.
Best Breakthrough Performance	2022	Loki	Sophia Di Martino	Won	
Best Duo / Best Team	2021	The Falcon and the Winter Soldier	Anthony Mackie and Sebastian Stan	Won	
Best Duo / Best Team	2022	Loki	Tom Hiddleston, Sophia Di Martino and Owen Wilson	Won	
Best Fight	2021	WandaVision	Elizabeth Olsen vs. Kathryn Hahn	Won	
Best Fight Against the System	2017	Luke Cage	Luke Cage	Nominated	
Best Hero	2017	Luke Cage	Mike Colter	Nominated	
Best Hero	2021	WandaVision	Teyonah Parris	Nominated	
Best Hero	2021	The Falcon and the Winter Soldier	Anthony Mackie	Won	
Best Hero	2022	Moon Knight	Oscar Isaac	Nominated	
Best Musical Moment	2021	WandaVision	"Agatha All Along"	Nominated	
Best Performance in a Show	2021	WandaVision	Elizabeth Olsen	Won	
Best Show	2021	WandaVision	WandaVision	Won	
Best Show	2022	Loki	Loki	Nominated	
Best Villain	2021	WandaVision	Kathryn Hahn	Won	

== Primetime Creative Arts Emmy Awards ==
Awards and nominations received by Marvel Cinematic Universe television series from Primetime Creative Arts Emmy Awards
Category	Year	Series	Recipient(s)	Result	Ref.
Outstanding Animated Program	2022	What If...?	"What If... Doctor Strange Lost His Heart Instead of His Hands?"	Nominated	
Outstanding Character Voice-Over Performance	2022	What If...?	Chadwick Boseman (for "What If... T'Challa Became a Star-Lord?")	Won	
Outstanding Character Voice-Over Performance	2022	What If...?	Jeffrey Wright (for "What If... Ultron Won?")	Nominated	
Outstanding Character Voice-Over Performance	2022	Moon Knight	F. Murray Abraham (for "The Friendly Type")	Nominated	
Outstanding Character Voice-Over Performance	2025	What If...?	Jeffrey Wright (for "What If... 1872?")	Nominated	
Outstanding Guest Actor in a Drama Series	2021	The Falcon and the Winter Soldier	Don Cheadle (for "New World Order")	Nominated	
Outstanding Sound Editing for a Comedy or Drama Series (One-Hour)	2015	Daredevil	Lauren Stephens, Jordan Wilby, Joshua Chase, Christian Buenaventura, Greg Vines, Alicia Stevenson, Dawn Lunsford (for "Speak of the Devil")	Nominated	
Outstanding Sound Editing for a Comedy or Drama Series (One-Hour)	2016	Daredevil	Lauren Stephens, Jordan Wilby, Jonathan Golodner, Christian Buenaventura, Greg Vines, Zane Bruce, Lindsay Pepper (for "New York's Finest")	Nominated	
Outstanding Sound Editing for a Comedy or Drama Series (One-Hour)	2021	The Falcon and the Winter Soldier	Matthew Wood, Bonnie Wild, James Spencer, Richard Quinn, Steve Slanec, Kimberly Patrick, Teresa Eckton, Frank Rinella, Devon Kelley, Larry Oatfield, Anele Onyekwere, Dan Pinder, Ronni Brown, Andrea Gard (for "One World, One People")	Nominated	
Outstanding Sound Editing for a Comedy or Drama Series (One-Hour)	2022	Loki	Matthew Wood, David Acord, Brad Semenoff, Steve Slanec, Kyrsten Mate, Adam Kopald, Joel Raabe, Anele Onyekwere, Ed Hamilton, Nashia Wachsman, Shelley Roden, and John Roesch (for "Journey into Mystery")	Nominated	
Outstanding Sound Mixing for a Comedy or Drama Series (One-Hour)	2024	Loki	Karol Urban and Paul Munro (for "Glorious Purpose")	Nominated	
Outstanding Special Visual Effects	2014	Agents of S.H.I.E.L.D.	"T.A.H.I.T.I."	Nominated	
Outstanding Special Visual Effects	2015	Agents of S.H.I.E.L.D.	"The Dirty Half Dozen"	Nominated	
Outstanding Special Visual Effects in a Season or Movie	2021	The Falcon and the Winter Soldier	Eric Leven, Mike May, John Haley, Daniel Mellitz, Chris Waegner, Charles Tait, Sébastien Francoeur, Chris Morley, Mark LeDoux	Nominated	
Outstanding Special Visual Effects in a Season or Movie	2021	WandaVision	Tara deMarco, James Alexander, Sarah Eim, Sandra Balej, David Allen, Marion Spates, Steve Moncur, Julien Hery, and Ryan Freer	Nominated	
Outstanding Special Visual Effects in a Season or Movie	2024	Loki	Christopher Townsend, Allison Paul, Sandra Balej, Matthew Twyford, Christopher Smallfield, John William Van der pool, Steve Moncur, Julian Hutchens, and Kevin Yuille	Nominated	
Outstanding Special Visual Effects in a Supporting Role	2015	Daredevil	David Van Dyke, Bryan Godwin, Karl Coyner, Steve J. Sanchez, Julie Long, Neiko Nagy, Moshe Swed, Kjell Strode, Pedro Tarrago (for "Speak of the Devil")	Nominated	
Outstanding Stunt Coordination	2016	Daredevil	Philip J. Silvera	Nominated	
Outstanding Stunt Coordination	2016	The Punisher	Thom Williams	Nominated	
Outstanding Stunt Coordination	2017	Luke Cage	James Lew	Won	
Outstanding Stunt Coordination	2021	The Falcon and the Winter Soldier	Hank Amos, Dave Macomber	Nominated	
Outstanding Stunt Coordination	2022	Moon Knight	Olivier Schneider and Yves Girard	Nominated	
Outstanding Stunt Coordination for a Comedy Series or Variety Program	2021	Hawkeye	Heidi Moneymaker and Noon Orsatti	Nominated	
Outstanding Stunt Performance	2021	The Falcon and the Winter Soldier	John Nania, Aaron Toney, Justin Eaton (for "Truth")	Nominated	
Outstanding Stunt Performance	2022	Hawkeye	Carl Richard Burden, Noon Orsatti, Renae Moneymaker, and Crystal Hooks (for "Echoes")	Nominated	
Outstanding Stunt Performance	2022	Moon Knight	Daren Nop, Jamel Blissat, Estelle Darnault, and Sara Leal (for "Gods and Monsters")	Nominated	
Outstanding Casting for a Limited or Anthology Series or Movie	2021	WandaVision	Sarah Halley Finn and Jason B. Stamey	Nominated	
Outstanding Cinematography for a Limited or Anthology Series or Movie	2022	Moon Knight	Gregory Middleton (for "Asylum")	Nominated	
Outstanding Cinematography for a Single-Camera Series (One Hour)	2022	Loki	Autumn Durald Arkapaw (for "Lamentis")	Nominated	
Outstanding Fantasy/Sci-Fi Costumes	2021	WandaVision	Mayes C. Rubeo, Joseph Feltus, Daniel Selon, and Virginia Burton (for "Filmed Before a Live Studio Audience")	Won	
Outstanding Fantasy/Sci-Fi Costumes	2022	Loki	Christine Wada, Nora Pederson, Tamsin Costello, and Carol Beadle (for "Glorious Purpose")	Nominated	
Outstanding Fantasy/Sci-Fi Costumes	2022	Moon Knight	Meghan Kasperlik, Martin Mandeville, Richard Davies, and Wilberth Gonzalez (for "Gods and Monsters")	Nominated	
Outstanding Fantasy/Sci-Fi Costumes	2024	Echo	Ambre Wrigley, Kizzie Martin Lillas, Kristina Elaine Taylor, Garnet Filo, and Amanda Steeley (for "Lowak")	Nominated	
Outstanding Fantasy/Sci-Fi Costumes	2024	Loki	Christine Wada, Harriet Kendall, Kristen Ernst-Brown, and Tom Hornsby (for "1893")	Nominated	
Outstanding Fantasy/Sci-Fi Costumes	2025	Agatha All Along	Daniel Selon, Ambre Wrigley, Christine Casaus, Maddison Carroll, Marilyn Madsen, and Greg Hopwood (for "Follow Me My Friend / To Glory at the End")	Nominated	
Outstanding Period and/or Character Hairstyling	2021	WandaVision	Karen Bartek, Cindy Welles, Nikki Wright, Anna Quinn, and Yvonne Kupka (for "Don't Touch That Dial")	Nominated	
Outstanding Period and/or Character Makeup (Non-Prosthetic)	2021	WandaVision	Tricia Sawyer, Vasilios Tanis, Jonah Levy, and Regina Little (for "Filmed Before a Live Studio Audience")	Nominated	
Outstanding Main Title Design	2015	Daredevil	Patrick Clair, Andrew Romatz, Miguel Salek, and Shahana Kahn	Nominated	
Outstanding Main Title Design	2016	Jessica Jones	Michelle Dougherty, Arisu Kashiwagi, Rod Basham, David Mack, Eric Demeusy, and Thomas McMahan	Nominated	
Outstanding Main Title Design	2021	WandaVision	John LePore, Doug Appleton, Nick Woythaler, and Alex Rupert	Nominated	
Outstanding Motion Design	2023	Ms. Marvel	Ian Spendloff, David Lochhead, Daniella Marsh, David Stumpf, Philip Robinson, and Matthew Thomas	Won	
Outstanding Music Composition for a Limited or Anthology Series, Movie or Special	2021	WandaVision	Christophe Beck (for "Previously On")	Nominated	
Outstanding Music Composition for a Limited or Anthology Series, Movie or Special	2022	Moon Knight	Hesham Nazih (for "Asylum")	Nominated	
Outstanding Music Composition for a Limited or Anthology Series, Movie or Special	2023	Ms. Marvel	Laura Karpman (for "Time and Again")	Nominated	
Outstanding Music Composition for a Series	2018	Jessica Jones	Sean Callery (for "AKA Playland")	Nominated	
Outstanding Music Composition for a Series	2022	Loki	Natalie Holt (for "Glorious Purpose")	Nominated	
Outstanding Original Main Title Theme Music	2016	Jessica Jones	Sean Callery	Won	
Outstanding Original Main Title Theme Music	2018	The Defenders	John Paesano	Nominated	
Outstanding Original Main Title Theme Music	2021	WandaVision	Kristen Anderson-Lopez and Robert Lopez	Nominated	
Outstanding Original Main Title Theme Music	2022	Loki	Natalie Holt	Nominated	
Outstanding Original Main Title Theme Music	2023	Ms. Marvel	Laura Karpman	Nominated	
Outstanding Original Music and Lyrics	2021	WandaVision	Kristen Anderson-Lopez and Robert Lopez (for "Agatha All Along")	Won	
Outstanding Original Music and Lyrics	2025	Agatha All Along	Kristen Anderson-Lopez and Robert Lopez (for "The Ballad of the Witches' Road")	Won	
Outstanding Music Supervision	2021	WandaVision	Dave Jordan and Shannon Murphy (for "Don't Touch That Dial")	Nominated	
Outstanding Single-Camera Picture Editing for a Limited or Anthology Series or Movie	2021	WandaVision	Nona Khodai (for "On a Very Special Episode...")	Nominated	
Outstanding Single-Camera Picture Editing for a Limited or Anthology Series or Movie	2021	WandaVision	Zene Baker, Michael A. Webber, Tim Roche, and Nona Khodai (for "The Series Finale")	Nominated	
Outstanding Single-Camera Picture Editing for a Limited or Anthology Series or Movie	2023	Ms. Marvel	Nona Khodai and Sabrina Plisco (for "Generation Why")	Nominated	
Outstanding Production Design for a Narrative Program (Half-Hour)	2021	WandaVision	Mark Worthington, Sharon Davis, and Kathy Orlando	Won	
Outstanding Production Design for a Narrative Contemporary Program (One Hour or More)	2022	Loki	Kasra Farahani, Natasha Gerasimova, and Claudia Bonfe (for "Glorious Purpose")	Nominated	
Outstanding Sound Editing for a Comedy or Drama Series (Half-Hour) and Animation	2025	Agatha All Along	Kim Foscato, Paula Fairfield, Richard Gould, Daniel Laurie, Jacob Riehle, Andre J.H. Zweers, Kim B. Christensen, Fernand Bos, Mary Parker, Jana Vance, and Ronni Brown (for "Darkest Hour / Wake Thy Power")	Nominated	
Outstanding Sound Editing for a Limited or Anthology Series, Movie or Special	2021	WandaVision	Gwendolyn Yates Whittle, Kim Foscato, James Spencer, Chris Gridley, Steve Orlando, Scott Guitteau, Jon Borland, Samson Neslund, Richard Gould, Jordan Myers, Luke Dunn Gielmuda, Greg Peterson, Fernand Bos, Anele Onyekwere, Ronni Brown, and Shelley Roden (for "The Series Finale")	Nominated	
Outstanding Sound Editing for a Limited or Anthology Series, Movie or Special	2022	Moon Knight	Bonnie Wild, Mac Smith, Kimberly Patrick, Vanessa Lapato, Matt Hartman, Teresa Eckton, Tim Farrell, Leo Marcil, Joel Raabe, Ian Chase, Anele Onyekwere, Stephanie Lowry, Carl Sealove, Dan O'Connell, and John Cucci (for "Gods and Monsters")	Won	
Outstanding Sound Mixing for a Limited or Anthology Series or Movie	2021	WandaVision	Danielle Dupre, Chris Giles, Doc Kane, and Casey Stone (for "The Series Finale")	Nominated	
Outstanding Sound Mixing for a Limited or Anthology Series or Movie	2022	Moon Knight	Bonnie Wild, Scott R. Lewis, Tamás Csaba, and Scott Michael Smith (for "Gods and Monsters")	Nominated	

== Primetime Emmy Awards ==
Awards and nominations received by Marvel Cinematic Universe television series from Primetime Emmy Awards
Category	Year	Series	Recipient(s)	Result	Ref.
Outstanding Limited or Anthology Series	2021	WandaVision	Kevin Feige, Louis D'Esposito, Victoria Alonso, Matt Shakman, Jac Schaeffer, Mary Livanos Trevor Waterson, Gretchen Enders, Chuck Hayward (for "WandaVision")	Nominated	
Outstanding Lead Actor in a Limited or Anthology Series or Movie	2021	WandaVision	Paul Bettany	Nominated	
Outstanding Lead Actress in a Limited or Anthology Series or Movie	2021	WandaVision	Elizabeth Olsen	Nominated	
Outstanding Supporting Actress in a Limited or Anthology Series or Movie	2021	WandaVision	Kathryn Hahn	Nominated	
Outstanding Directing for a Limited or Anthology Series or Movie	2021	WandaVision	Matt Shakman (for "WandaVision")	Nominated	
Outstanding Writing for a Limited or Anthology Series or Movie	2021	WandaVision	Chuck Hayward, Peter Cameron (for "All-New Halloween Spooktacular!")	Nominated	
Outstanding Writing for a Limited or Anthology Series or Movie	2021	WandaVision	Jac Schaeffer (for "Filmed Before a Live Studio Audience")	Nominated	
Outstanding Writing for a Limited or Anthology Series or Movie	2021	WandaVision	Laura Donney (for "Previously On")	Nominated	
Outstanding Lead Actor in a Comedy Series	2026	Wonder Man	Yahya Abdul-Mateen II	Nominated	

== Saturn Awards ==
Awards and nominations received by Marvel Cinematic Universe television series from Saturn Awards
Category	Year	Series	Recipient	Result	Ref.
Best Actor on Television	2016	Daredevil	Charlie Cox	Nominated	
Best Actor on Television	2017	Daredevil	Charlie Cox	Nominated	
Best Actor on Television	2017	Luke Cage	Mike Colter	Nominated	
Best Actor on Television	2018	The Punisher	Jon Bernthal	Nominated	
Best Actress on Television	2015	Agent Carter	Hayley Atwell	Nominated	
Best Actress on Television	2016	Jessica Jones	Krysten Ritter	Nominated	
Best Actress on Television	2024	She-Hulk: Attorney at Law	Tatiana Maslany	Nominated	
Best Actor in a Streaming Series	2019	Daredevil	Charlie Cox	Nominated	
Best Actor in a Streaming Series	2019	The Punisher	Jon Bernthal	Nominated	
Best Actor in a Streaming Series	2022	The Falcon & The Winter Soldier	Anthony Mackie	Nominated	
Best Actor in a Streaming Series	2022	Loki	Tom Hiddleston	Nominated	
Best Actor in a Streaming Series	2022	Moon Knight	Oscar Isaac	Won	
Best Actress in a Streaming Series	2019	Jessica Jones	Krysten Ritter	Nominated	
Best Actress in a Streaming Series	2022	WandaVision	Elizabeth Olsen	Nominated	
Best Animated Series on Television	2022	What If...?	What If...?	Nominated	
Best Fantasy Television Series	2022	WandaVision	WandaVision	Nominated	
Best Fantasy Television Series	2022	Loki	Loki	Won	
Best Guest Starring Role on Television	2015	Agent Carter	Dominic Cooper	Nominated	
Best Guest Starring Role on Television	2016	Daredevil	Scott Glenn	Nominated	
Best Guest Performance in a Streaming Series	2022	Loki	Jonathan Majors	Nominated	
Best Guest Performance in a Streaming Series	2022	Hawkeye	Tony Dalton	Nominated	
Best Network Television Series	2014	Agents of S.H.I.E.L.D.	Agents of S.H.I.E.L.D.	Nominated	
Best New Media Television Series	2016	Daredevil	Daredevil	Won	
Best New Media Television Series	2016	Jessica Jones	Jessica Jones	Nominated	
Best New Media Television Series	2017	Luke Cage	Luke Cage	Won	
Best New Media Television Series	2017	Daredevil	Daredevil	Nominated	
Best Performance by a Younger Actor in a Streaming Television Series	2022	Hawkeye	Hailee Steinfeld	Nominated	
Best Performance by a Younger Actor in a Streaming Television Series	2022	Ms. Marvel	Iman Vellani	Won	
Best Superhero Television Series	2015	Agent Carter	Agent Carter	Nominated	
Best Superhero Television Series	2015	Agents of S.H.I.E.L.D.	Agents of S.H.I.E.L.D.	Nominated	
Best Superhero Television Series	2016	Agent Carter	Agent Carter	Nominated	
Best Superhero Television Series	2016	Agents of S.H.I.E.L.D.	Agents of S.H.I.E.L.D.	Nominated	
Best Superhero Television Series	2017	Agents of S.H.I.E.L.D.	Agents of S.H.I.E.L.D.	Nominated	
Best Superhero Television Series	2018	Agents of S.H.I.E.L.D.	Agents of S.H.I.E.L.D.	Nominated	
Best Superhero Television Series	2019	Cloak & Dagger	Cloak & Dagger	Nominated	
Best Superhero Television Series	2024	She-Hulk: Attorney at Law	She-Hulk: Attorney at Law	Nominated	
Best Superhero Television Series	2024	Secret Invasion	Secret Invasion	Nominated	
Best Supporting Actress on Television	2018	Jessica Jones	Krysten Ritter	Nominated	
Best Supporting Actor on Television	2016	Daredevil	Vincent D'Onofrio	Nominated	
Best Supporting Actor on Television	2016	Jessica Jones	David Tennant	Nominated	
Best Supporting Actor in a Streaming Series	2022	Moon Knight	Ethan Hawke	Nominated	
Best Supporting Actress in a Streaming Series	2019	Daredevil	Deborah Ann Woll	Nominated	
Best Supporting Actress in a Streaming Series	2022	WandaVision	Kathryn Hahn	Nominated	
Best Streaming Superhero Series	2018	Runaways	Runaways	Nominated	
Best Streaming Superhero Series	2018	The Punisher	The Punisher	Won	
Best Streaming Superhero Series	2018	Iron Fist	Iron Fist	Nominated	
Best Streaming Superhero Series	2018	The Defenders	The Defenders	Nominated	
Best Streaming Superhero Series	2019	Daredevil	Daredevil	Won	
Best Streaming Superhero Series	2019	Runaways	Runaways	Nominated	
Best Streaming Superhero Series	2019	The Punisher	The Punisher	Nominated	
Best Streaming Superhero Series	2019	Jessica Jones	Jessica Jones	Nominated	
Best Limited Event Series (Streaming)	2022	Hawkeye	Hawkeye	Nominated	
Best Limited Event Series (Streaming)	2022	Moon Knight	Moon Knight	Nominated	
Best Limited Event Series (Streaming)	2022	Ms. Marvel	Ms. Marvel	Nominated	

== Visual Effects Society ==
Awards and nominations received by Marvel Cinematic Universe television series from Visual Effects Society
Category	Year	Series	Recipient(s)	Result	Ref.
Outstanding Animated Character in an Episode or Real-Time Project	2023	She-Hulk: Attorney at Law	"She-Hulk" – Elizabeth Bernard, Jan Philip Cramer, Edwina Ting, and Andrew Park	Nominated	
Outstanding Compositing and Lighting in an Episode	2022	Loki	"Shuroo City Destruction" – Paul Chapman, Tom Truscott, Biagio Figliuzzi, Attila Szalma (for "Lamentis")	Won	
Outstanding Compositing and Lighting in an Episode	2022	The Falcon and the Winter Soldier	Nathan Abbot, Beck Veitch, Markus Reithoffer, James Alduos (for "New World Order")	Nominated	
Outstanding Compositing and Lighting in an Episode	2022	WandaVision	"Goodbye, Vision" – David Zaretti, Bimpe Alliu, Michael Duong, Mark Pascoe (for "Previously On")	Nominated	
Outstanding Compositing and Lighting in an Episode	2022	WandaVision	"The Hex" – David Zaretti, Bimpe Alliu, Michael Duong, Mark Pascoe (for "The Series Finale")	Nominated	
Outstanding Created Environment in an Episode, Commercial, or Real-Time Project	2022	Hawkeye	Nicholas Hodgson, David Abbott, Nick Cattel, Jin Choi (for "Echoes")	Nominated	
Outstanding Created Environment in an Episode, Commercial, or Real-Time Project	2022	Hawkeye	John O'Connell, Tiffany Yung, Orion Terry, Ho Kyung Ahn (for "So This Is Christmas?")	Nominated	
Outstanding Effects Simulations in an Episode, Commercial, or Real-Time Project	2022	Loki	"Alioth Cloud" – George Kuruvilla, Menno Dijkstra, Matthew Hanger, Jiyong Shin (for "Journey into Mystery")	Nominated	
Outstanding Effects Simulations in an Episode, Commercial, or Real-Time Project	2022	WandaVision	"Vision's Destruction" – Sylvian Nouveau, Hakim Harrouche, Omar Meradi, Lauren Meste (for "All-New Halloween Spooktacular!")	Nominated	
Outstanding Supporting Visual Effects in a Photoreal Episode	2016	Agent Carter	Sheena Duggal, Addie Manis, Richard Bluff, Jayesh Dalal, Kenneth C. Clark (for "Now is Not the End")	Nominated	
Outstanding Supporting Visual Effects in a Photoreal Episode	2016	Daredevil	Bryan Godwin, David Van Dyke, Karl Coyner, Julie Long, Johan Kunz (for "Speak of the Devil")	Nominated	
Outstanding Virtual Cinematography in a CG Project	2022	Loki	"Race to the Ark" – Jesse Lewis-Evans, Luke Avery, Autumn Durald Arkapaw, Scott Inkster (for "Lamentis")	Nominated	
Outstanding Visual Effects in a Photoreal Episode	2014	Agents of S.H.I.E.L.D.	Mark Kolpack, Sabrina Arnold, David Altenau, H Haden Hammond (for "Pilot")	Nominated	
Outstanding Visual Effects in a Photoreal Episode	2015	Agents of S.H.I.E.L.D.	Mark Kolpack, Sabrina Arnold, Gary D'Amico, Kevin Lingenfelser, David Beedon (for Agents of S.H.I.E.L.D.)	Nominated	
Outstanding Visual Effects in a Photoreal Episode	2018	Agents of S.H.I.E.L.D.	Mark Kolpack, Sabrina Arnold, David Rey, Kevin Yuille, Gary D'Amico (for "Orientation: Part 1")	Nominated	
Outstanding Visual Effects in a Photoreal Episode	2022	Loki	Dan DeLeeuw, Allison Paul, Sandra Balej, David Seager (for "Journey into Mystery")	Nominated	
