= List of accolades received by The Avengers (2012 film) =

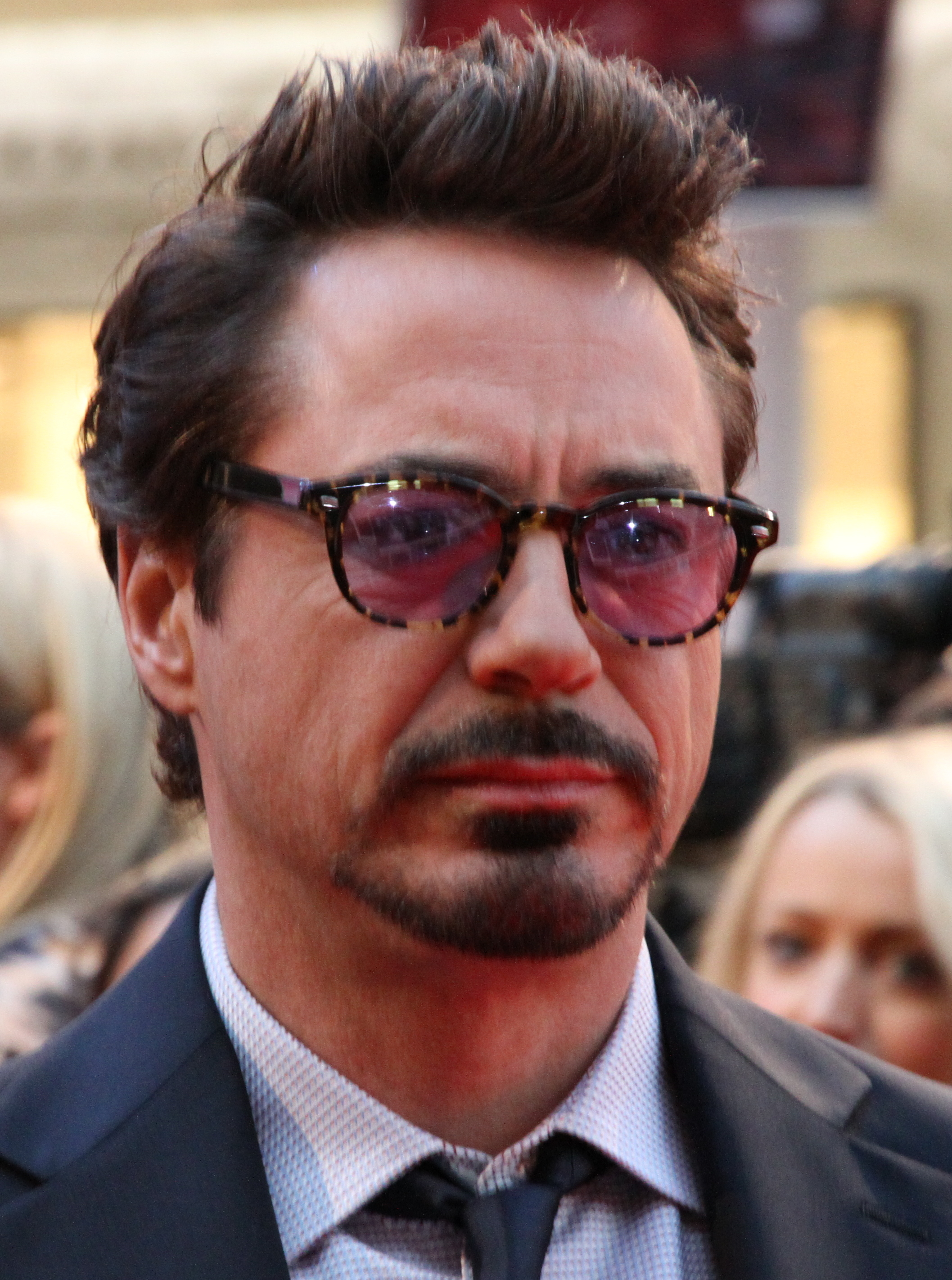
- Robert Downey Jr. received the most acting nominations for The Avengers with a total of ten.
Awards and nominations
Award	Wins	Nominations
Academy Awards	0	1
Annie Awards	1	2
Bradbury Award	0	1
British Academy Film Awards	0	1
Critics' Choice Movie Awards	0	3
Detroit Film Critics Society	0	1
Empire Awards	0	5
Golden Reel Awards	0	1
Golden Trailer Awards	1	3
Hollywood Film Festival	1	1
Hugo Awards	1	1
Kids' Choice Awards	0	6
MTV Movie Awards	3	6
People's Choice Awards	3	13
Saturn Awards	4	6
St. Louis Gateway Film Critics Association	0	1
Taurus World Stunt Awards	4	6
Teen Choice Awards	2	11
Visual Effects Society	2	6

Totals (Note: Certain award groups do not simply award one winner. They acknowledge several different recipients, have runners-up, and have third place. Since this is a specific recognition and is different from losing an award, runner-up mentions are considered wins in this award tally. For simplification and to avoid errors, each award in this list has been presumed to have had a prior nomination.)
- Wins: 22
- Nominations: 75

Marvel's The Avengers (also known as Marvel Avengers Assemble in the UK and Ireland), or simply The Avengers, is a 2012 American superhero film, scripted and directed by Joss Whedon, based on the Marvel Comics superhero team of the same name. The film stars an ensemble cast consisting of Robert Downey Jr., Chris Evans, Mark Ruffalo, Chris Hemsworth, Scarlett Johansson, Jeremy Renner, Tom Hiddleston, Clark Gregg, Cobie Smulders, Stellan Skarsgård and Samuel L. Jackson. In The Avengers, Nick Fury (Jackson), director of the peacekeeping organization S.H.I.E.L.D., recruits Iron Man (Downey), Captain America (Evans), the Hulk (Ruffalo), and Thor (Hemsworth) to form a team that must stop Thor's adoptive brother Loki (Hiddleston) from subjugating Earth.

The Avengers, produced on a budget of $220 million, was released theatrically in the United States on May 4, 2012, and grossed a worldwide total of over $1.5 billion. The film has garnered numerous awards and nominations with most nominations recognizing the film itself, the performances of the cast (particularly those of Downey, Johansson and Hemsworth) and the film's visual effects. The Avengers was nominated for an Academy Award for Best Visual Effects and a BAFTA Award for Best Special Visual Effects. The film was also nominated for three Critics' Choice Movie Awards, five Empire Awards, six Kids' Choice Awards, six MTV Movie Awards (winning three), thirteen People's Choice Awards (winning three), six Saturn Awards (winning four), eleven Teen Choice Awards (winning two), and six VES Awards (winning two).

== Accolades ==
Award	Date of ceremony	Category	Recipient(s)	Result	Ref(s)
Golden Trailer Awards	May 31, 2012	Summer 2012 Blockbuster Trailer	"Personal" (MOCEAN)	Nominated	
Golden Trailer Awards	May 31, 2012	Best Action TV Spot	"Become" (MOCEAN)	Nominated	
Teen Choice Awards	July 22, 2012	Choice Movie: Sci-Fi/Fantasy	The Avengers	Nominated	
Teen Choice Awards	July 22, 2012	Choice Movie Actor: Sci-Fi/Fantasy	Chris Hemsworth	Nominated	
Teen Choice Awards	July 22, 2012	Choice Movie Actor: Sci-Fi/Fantasy	Robert Downey Jr.	Nominated	
Teen Choice Awards	July 22, 2012	Choice Movie Actress: Sci-Fi/Fantasy	Scarlett Johansson	Nominated	
Teen Choice Awards	July 22, 2012	Choice Movie: Hissy Fit	Mark Ruffalo	Nominated	
Teen Choice Awards	July 22, 2012	Choice Movie: Villain	Tom Hiddleston	Nominated	
Teen Choice Awards	July 22, 2012	Choice Movie: Male Scene Stealer	Chris Evans	Nominated	
Teen Choice Awards	July 22, 2012	Choice Summer Movie: Action	The Avengers	Won	
Teen Choice Awards	July 22, 2012	Choice Summer Movie Star: Male	Robert Downey Jr.	Nominated	
Teen Choice Awards	July 22, 2012	Choice Summer Movie Star: Male	Chris Hemsworth (The Avengers and Snow White and the Huntsman)	Won	
Teen Choice Awards	July 22, 2012	Choice Summer Movie Star: Female	Scarlett Johansson	Nominated	
Hollywood Awards	October 10, 2012	Visual Effects	Jeff White	Won	
Detroit Film Critics Society	December 14, 2012	Best Ensemble	Marvel's The Avengers	Nominated	
St. Louis Gateway Film Critics Association	December 17, 2012	Best Visual Effects	The Avengers	Nominated	
People's Choice Awards	January 9, 2013	Favorite Movie	The Avengers	Nominated	
People's Choice Awards	January 9, 2013	Favorite Action Movie	The Avengers	Nominated	
People's Choice Awards	January 9, 2013	Favorite Movie Franchise	The Avengers	Nominated	
People's Choice Awards	January 9, 2013	Favorite Movie Actor	Robert Downey Jr.	Won	
People's Choice Awards	January 9, 2013	Favorite Movie Actress	Scarlett Johansson	Nominated	
People's Choice Awards	January 9, 2013	Favorite Action Movie Star	Chris Evans	Nominated	
People's Choice Awards	January 9, 2013	Favorite Action Movie Star	Chris Hemsworth (The Avengers and Snow White and the Huntsman)	Won	
People's Choice Awards	January 9, 2013	Favorite Action Movie Star	Robert Downey Jr.	Nominated	
People's Choice Awards	January 9, 2013	Favorite Movie Superhero	Chris Evans as Captain America	Nominated	
People's Choice Awards	January 9, 2013	Favorite Movie Superhero	Chris Hemsworth as Thor	Nominated	
People's Choice Awards	January 9, 2013	Favorite Movie Superhero	Robert Downey Jr. as Iron Man	Won	
People's Choice Awards	January 9, 2013	Favorite On-Screen Chemistry	Scarlett Johansson, and Jeremy Renner	Nominated	
People's Choice Awards	January 9, 2013	Favorite Face of Heroism	Scarlett Johansson	Nominated	
Critic's Choice Awards	January 10, 2013	Best Action Movie	The Avengers	Nominated	
Critic's Choice Awards	January 10, 2013	Best Actor in an Action Movie	Robert Downey Jr.	Nominated	
Critic's Choice Awards	January 10, 2013	Best Visual Effects	The Avengers	Nominated	
Annie Award	February 2, 2013	Outstanding Achievement, Animated Effects in a Live Action Production	Jerome Platteaux, John Sigurdson, Ryan Hopkins, Raul Essig, and Mark Chataway The Avengers – Industrial Light & Magic	Won	
Annie Award	February 2, 2013	Outstanding Achievement, Character Animation in a Live Action Production	Jakub Pistecky, Maia Kayser, Scott Benza, Steve King, and Kiran Bhat The Avengers – Industrial Light & Magic	Nominated	
VES Awards	February 5, 2013	Outstanding Visual Effects in a Visual Effects-Driven Feature Motion Picture	The Avengers: Susan Pickett, Janek Sirrs, Jeff White, and Guy Williams	Nominated	
VES Awards	February 5, 2013	Outstanding Animated Character in a Live Action Feature Motion Picture	The Hulk: Marc Chu, John Doublestein, Cyrus Jam, and Jason Smith	Nominated	
VES Awards	February 5, 2013	Outstanding Created Environment in a Live Action Feature Motion Picture	Midtown Manhattan: Richard Bluff, Giles Hancock, David Meny, and Andy Proctor	Won	
VES Awards	February 5, 2013	Outstanding Virtual Cinematography in a Live Action Feature Motion Picture	Downtown Manhattan: Colin Benoit, Jeremy Goldman, Tory Mercer, and Anthony Rispoli	Nominated	
VES Awards	February 5, 2013	Outstanding Models in a Feature Motion Picture	Helicarrier: Rene Garcia, Bruce Holcomb, Polly Ing, and Aaron Wilson	Won	
VES Awards	February 5, 2013	Outstanding Compositing in a Feature Motion Picture	Hulk Punch: Chris Balog, Peter Demarest, Nelson Sepulveda, and Alan Travis	Nominated	
British Academy Film Awards	February 10, 2013	Best Special Visual Effects	The Avengers	Nominated	
Golden Reel Awards	February 17, 2013	Best Sound Editing — Sound Effects and Foley in a Feature Film	The Avengers	Nominated	
Academy Awards	February 24, 2013	Best Visual Effects	Janek Sirrs, Jeff White, Guy Williams, and Dan Sudick	Nominated	
Kids' Choice Awards	March 23, 2013	Favorite Movie	The Avengers	Nominated	
Kids' Choice Awards	March 23, 2013	Favorite Movie Actress	Scarlett Johansson	Nominated	
Kids' Choice Awards	March 23, 2013	Favorite Male Buttkicker	Robert Downey Jr.	Nominated	
Kids' Choice Awards	March 23, 2013	Favorite Male Buttkicker	Chris Hemsworth	Nominated	
Kids' Choice Awards	March 23, 2013	Favorite Female Buttkicker	Scarlett Johansson	Nominated	
Kids' Choice Awards	March 23, 2013	Favorite Villain	Tom Hiddleston	Nominated	
Empire Awards	March 24, 2013	Best Sci-Fi/Fantasy	The Avengers	Nominated	
Empire Awards	March 24, 2013	Best 3D	The Avengers	Nominated	
Empire Awards	March 24, 2013	Best Director	Joss Whedon	Nominated	
Empire Awards	March 24, 2013	Best Actor	Robert Downey Jr.	Nominated	
Empire Awards	March 24, 2013	Best Film	The Avengers	Nominated	
MTV Movie Awards	April 14, 2013	Movie of the Year	The Avengers	Won	
MTV Movie Awards	April 14, 2013	Best On-Screen Duo	Robert Downey Jr., and Mark Ruffalo	Nominated	
MTV Movie Awards	April 14, 2013	Best Fight	Robert Downey Jr., Chris Evans, Mark Ruffalo, Chris Hemsworth, Scarlett Johansson, and Jeremy Renner vs. Tom Hiddleston	Won	
MTV Movie Awards	April 14, 2013	Best Hero	Robert Downey Jr.	Nominated	
MTV Movie Awards	April 14, 2013	Best Hero	Mark Ruffalo	Nominated	
MTV Movie Awards	April 14, 2013	Best Villain	Tom Hiddleston	Won	
Golden Trailer Awards	May 3, 2013	GTA's Top of the Box Office Award for 2012	The Avengers	Won	
Taurus World Stunt Awards	May 11, 2013	Best Fight	The Avengers	Won	
Taurus World Stunt Awards	May 11, 2013	Best High Work	The Avengers	Won	
Taurus World Stunt Awards	May 11, 2013	Best Work With A Vehicle	The Avengers	Nominated	
Taurus World Stunt Awards	May 11, 2013	Best Overall Stunt By A Stunt Woman	The Avengers	Won	
Taurus World Stunt Awards	May 11, 2013	Hardest Hit	The Avengers	Won	
Taurus World Stunt Awards	May 11, 2013	Best Stunt Coordinator And/Or Second Unit Director	The Avengers	Nominated	
Nebula Awards	May 19, 2013	Ray Bradbury Award for Outstanding Dramatic Presentation	The Avengers: Joss Whedon (director and writer), and Zak Penn (writer)	Nominated	
Saturn Awards	June 26, 2013	Best Science Fiction Film	The Avengers	Won	
Saturn Awards	June 26, 2013	Best Supporting Actor	Clark Gregg	Won	
Saturn Awards	June 26, 2013	Best Director	Joss Whedon	Won	
Saturn Awards	June 26, 2013	Best Writing	Joss Whedon	Nominated	
Saturn Awards	June 26, 2013	Best Editing	Jeffrey Ford, and Lisa Lassek	Nominated	
Saturn Awards	June 26, 2013	Best Special Effects	Janek Sirrs, Jeff White, Guy Williams, and Dan Sudick	Won	
Hugo Awards	September 1, 2013	Best Dramatic Presentation — Long Form	The Avengers	Won	
