= Natalie Holt =

British composer

- Born: Natalie Ann Holt; 29 June 1982 (age 44); Worthing, West Sussex, England
- Genres: Film and television scores, experimental, electronic
- Occupation: Composer
- Instruments: Piano, keyboards, synthesizer, violin, viola, accordion
- Years active: 2005–present
- Website: natalieholt.com

Natalie Ann Holt (born 29 June 1982) is a British composer who has worked on numerous film and television projects. She is primarily recognised for her work on several notable productions, including Paddington (2014) and Loki (2021–2023). She trained at the Royal Academy of Music and then the National Film and Television School and had a career as a classical violinist before becoming a film composer. Holt's distinction in her field was recognised by being made an associate of the Royal Academy of Music in 2017.

== Career ==
Holt's early contributions include minor roles as orchestrator and copyist on films such as Stardust. After graduating, she composed her own music for a number of short films, including the Royal Television Society award-winning short Friends Forever (2008), while working as a professional violinist. In 2007, she became part of RaVen Quartet, a London-based string quartet that performed their own musical arrangements. RaVen would go on to perform with Madness during the 2012 London Olympics closing ceremony. By this time, the group had also played for Prince Harry at Buckingham Palace and were part of George Michael's Symphonica tour.

Holt's breakthrough in composing came in 2012, when she worked with Martin Phipps on Great Expectations, which was nominated for a BAFTA award for Best Score. Holt then co-composed with Phipps for the BBC drama The Honourable Woman, for which they jointly won the 2015 Ivor Novello Award for Best Television Soundtrack, and were nominated again for a BAFTA. She most recently collaborated with Phipps in 2017 for Victoria, for which she was nominated for a Primetime Emmy Award in the category of "Outstanding Music Composition for a Series".

Holt subsequently wrote the original scores for a number of other high-profile television dramas including the multiple BAFTA award-winning and Royal Television Society winning score for Philippa Lowthorpe's drama series Three Girls. Holt has also worked on My Mother and Other Strangers, the final series of Wallander, and the BBC adaptation of Sathnam Sanghera's novel The Boy With The Topknot. In addition, she has scored two BBC TV series written by BAFTA award-winning playwright Mike Bartlett (Press and Sticks and Stones), Gurinder Chada's 2018 series Beecham House, and in 2020 was nominated for a Royal Television Society Award for her score to ITV drama Deadwater Fell.

Holt has also composed music for a number of films including Saul Dibb's film adaptation Journey's End, for which she jointly won Best Score at Beijing International Film Festival with Hildur Guðnadóttir. Peter Bradshaw named the score in his BAFTA predictions of 2018, and the score was described as "sinuously driving the narrative momentum" and "creating a sense of horror and dread". Holt wrote additional music for Heyday Film's Paddington and the score for the first feature from Deborah Haywood, Pin Cushion, which premiered at the Venice Film Festival in 2018. In 2019, she worked on Infidel and Herself. She has most recently worked on the Marvel Studios Disney+ series Loki, which is set in the Marvel Cinematic Universe and was described in the Washington Post as delivering "a suspenseful and mysterious vibe while providing Marvel's horned menace with a theme song that might just be the MCU's best". In 2022, it was announced that Holt would serve as composer for the Obi-Wan Kenobi series for Disney+, becoming the first woman to ever score a live-action Star Wars project. In 2022, Holt had worked on composing the score for Batgirl, a film that was ultimately canceled during production.

== Personal life ==
Holt was born in Worthing, West Sussex, studied violin at the Royal Academy of Music and composing at the National Film and Television School. She resides in London. Holt has a daughter.

== Controversy ==
In the 2013 final of Britain's Got Talent, Holt was performing in the backing orchestra of finalists Richard & Adam. During their performance she walked on stage and threw eggs at the judge, Simon Cowell. She was protesting Cowell's "dreadful influence on the music business".

== Discography ==
=== Film ===
Year	Title	Notes
2005	Heavy Metal Jr.	
2007	Stardust	Music production assistant
2011	The Holding	Composed with James Edward Barker
2011	Mesocafé	
2012	Animals	
2013	Chinese Lessons	
2013	A Class of Their Own	
2015	Woman in Gold	Additional composer
2017	Pin Cushion	
2017	Journey's End	Composed with Hildur Guðnadóttir
2018	Gun No 6	
2019	Cordelia	
2020	Infidel	
2020	Herself	
2020	Kindred	Composed with Jack Halama
2022	The Princess	
2024	She's Got No Name	
2026	Shaun the Sheep: The Beast of Mossy Bottom	

=== Television ===
Year	Title	Notes
2008	The Things I Haven't Told You	Television film
2009	3MW: Subtitles Not Included	
2011	Great Expectations	Three episodes, composed with Martin Phipps (Two episodes)
2012	Tooned	
2013	Britain's Got Talent	The Egg Throwing Woman
2013	Big Fat Quiz of the Year	Mystery Guest
2014	The Honourable Woman	Composed with Martin Phipps (8 episodes)
2015	Wallander	
2016–2018	The Happos Family	
2016	My Mother and Other Strangers	
2017	Three Girls	
2017	Kat & Alfie: Redwater	
2017	The Boy with the Topknot	Television film
2018	Press	6 episodes
2018	Doing Money	Television film
2019	Knightfall	Season 2 (8 episodes)
2019	Beecham House	6 episodes
2019	Sticks and Stones	3 episodes
2020	Deadwater Fell	4 episodes
2021–2023	Loki	12 episodes, also made a cameo as an accordion player in Heart of the TVA)
2022	Obi-Wan Kenobi	6 episodes, theme composed by John Williams and adapted by William Ross
2024–present	Rivals	8 episodes, composed with Jack Halama
2025	Chad Powers	6 episodes

=== Short films ===
Year	Title	Notes
2007	Dupe	
2007	Moog	
2007	1977	
2007	Our Footsteps in the Leaves	
2007	The Other Half	
2007	The End for Beginners	
2007	Friends Forever	
2008	Survivor	
2008	The Clap Dudes	
2009	Echoes	
2011	Gato encerrado	
2014	The Feminist Car Commercial	
2019	Rachel	
