= Stained Glass Scarlet =

Publication information
- Publisher: Marvel Comics
- First appearance: Moon Knight #14 (December 1981)
- Created by: Doug Moench, Bill Sienkiewicz, Jim Shooter

In-story information
- Full name: Scarlet Fasinera
- Species: Human
- Place of origin: New York City
- Abilities: Mysterious psychic bond with Moon Knight; Expert in martial art and weapons

Stained Glass Scarlet (real name Scarlet Fasinera) is a supervillain appearing in American comic books published by Marvel Comics. The character was created by Doug Moench, Bill Sienkiewicz, and Jim Shooter.

== Publication history ==
Scarlet made her debut in December 1981 in Moon Knight #14. She re-appeared several times in the series thereafter.

She returned in Marc Spector: Moon Knight #26 (May 1991), for a 5-part story titled Scarlet Redemption which ran until Marc Spector: Moon Knight #30 (September 1991).

She featured in the 1998 Moon Knight miniseries which was written by her co-creator Doug Moench.

She also appeared in the All-New Official Handbook of the Marvel Universe #10 (October 2006),Civil War Battle Damage Report #1 (March 2007). and the Official Handbook of the Marvel Universe A-Z #11 (January 2010).

== Fictional character biography ==
Stained Glass Scarlet is an ex-nun who became a vigilante after being forced to kill her criminal son. Scarlet was trained in combat when she became a prison guard in a women's prison.

Abused by her father, Scarlet had an unhappy childhood. One evening when she had had enough of it, she killed her father by lighting his bed with a cigarette. His death was considered an accident and she was sent to live with her uncle and aunt, where her living conditions were improved.

Later in life, she met and married Vince Fasinera, a small-time criminal, believing that she could save him from himself. She was wrong, and he simply mistreated her, much like her father had. Despite this, they had a child together, Joseph, though Vince wanted nothing to do with him. Vince was later shot to death on the steps of a church, and their son turned to a life of crime himself. He was later called Mad Dog.

When Joseph escapes prison, Scarlet attempts to save him, but is ultimately forced to kill him. In response, Scarlet becomes a vigilante and hunts down the criminals who were involved in her son's turning to crime. Moon Knight attempts to stop her, but ends up letting her escape.

=== Scarlet Redemption ===
Scarlet returns and haunts the streets of Brooklyn armed with her crossbow. She finds Bertrand Crawley and, recognizing him as a friend of Moon Knight, fires a crossbow bolt into his shoulder. Crawley runs off and falls through the glass front door of Gena's Diner. Scarlet follows after him, firing several more shots into the diner. She pitches Gena Landers through a window then fires a shot into the oven's gas lines, causing the entire building to explode. Scarlet returns to the church where she lives, confident that her "sweet angel" will come for her.

That evening, Marc Spector stands before the statue of Khonshu and suddenly sees a vision of Scarlet. He knows that Scarlet is destined to come back into his life. Marc learns about the destruction of Gena's Diner and promises Gena to help rebuild the building. When Marc leaves the hospital and goes to the Bronx Memorial Cemetery, a group of nuns answering to Scarlet emerge from the shadows and attack him. Scarlet appears and fires a crossbow bolt that tears a hole through Moon Knight's mask before disappearing.

Scarlet later returns, having formed a psychic link to Moon Knight. While confronting Moon Knight, she jumps off a bridge. Moon Knight is unable to find Scarlet, who is presumed dead.

=== The Resurrection War ===
Scarlet aids Moon Knight in fighting an alliance of some of his oldest foes: Raoul Bushman, Black Spectre, and Morpheus. However, her willingness to kill continues to put her at odds with Moon Knight. After preventing her from killing a defeated Black Spectre and before his final showdown with Bushman and Morpheus, Moon Knight urges her to flee the scene before the police arrive and she is last seen returning to her church.

=== Civil War ===
In the aftermath of the superhero Civil War, Scarlet is among the names listed as a potential recruit for the 50-States Initiative in the appendix of Tony Stark's battle damage report.

=== Devil's Reign ===
At some point, Scarlet is killed during a confrontation with the police in an old church. Her death makes her an urban legend, with people praying to her for vengeance. The public's belief in her resurrects Scarlet as a faceless, four-armed woman made of broken glass, sporting a halo and wrapped in a red dress and hood.

== Powers and abilities ==
While Scarlet does not have any apparent powers, she possesses a mysterious psychic bond with Moon Knight. This psychic bond is not systematic. It appears when Stained Glass Scarlet concentrates on Moon Knight, and can manifest in the form of dreams during which their thoughts intermingle and allow them to briefly communicate. This bond between Stained Glass Scarlet and Moon Knight could be due to an entity close to the Egyptian god of the moon, Khonshu, and reincarnated as Stained Glass Scarlet.

Scarlet is an expert in martial arts. She is able to wield bayonets, guns, and crossbows with precision.
