= Frenchie (comics) =

Publication information
- Publisher: Marvel Comics
- First appearance: Werewolf by Night #32 (August 1975)
- Created by: Doug Moench; Don Perlin

In-story information
- Alter ego: Jean Paul DuChamp
- Supporting character of: Moon Knight
- Notable aliases: Bloodline, Monsieur LaBlanc
- Abilities: Expert at hand-to-hand combat

Jean-Paul DuChamp, typically referred to as Frenchie, is a character appearing in American comic books published by Marvel Comics. He is primarily seen as the pilot and sidekick to Moon Knight.

== Publication history ==
The character first appeared in Werewolf by Night #32, in August 1975, which also featured the first appearance of Moon Knight. The character would next appear in The Defenders issue 49, in July 1977, becoming a recurring character in the 1980 Moon Knight series, and the 1989 series Marc Spector: Moon Knight. The character also played a significant role in the 2006 Moon Knight series and was also featured in the 2009 series Vengeance of the Moon Knight. The character would later reappear in the 2016 Moon Knight series as a mental patient in New York City.

== Fictional character biography ==
Frenchie was originally romantically involved with a woman named Isabelle Kristel, but she later left him. After this, he became a mercenary and encountered Marc Spector and Raoul Bushman. Once Spector became Moon Knight, Frenchie helped him fight Bushman, who had betrayed them. He would later design and build Moon Knight's Mooncopter.

Frenchie then went undercover to infiltrate the crime organization the Committee under the alias Monsieur LeBlanc, which allowed Moon Knight to bring down the organization.

Frenchie is later crippled when Moon Knight's brother Randall attacks his mansion. He also learns from his girlfriend Chloe Tran that he is descended from the Hellbent, a supernatural demonic species, and possesses the ability to transform into one.

After being driven away by Moon Knight, Frenchie becomes partners with his therapist Rob Silverman, and they open a restaurant called En Table. It is revealed he is gay and was attracted to Marc. After Norman Osborn attacks the two, leaving Silverman in critical condition, Frenchie and Moon Knight join forces to get revenge on him.

== Powers and abilities ==
Frenchie is a skilled pilot and above-average hand-to-hand combatant. Additionally, he can transform into a duplicate of his Hellbent ancestors, taking on their personality and abilities.

== Reception ==
In 2022, Comic Book Resources (CBR) ranked Frenchie first in their "Moon Knight's 10 Closest Allies In The Comics" list.

== In other media ==
Frenchie appears in the Moon Knight table for Pinball FX 2.
