= Profile (Marvel Comics) =

The Profile
- The Profile. Art by Mark Texeira.

Publication information
- Publisher: Marvel Comics
- First appearance: Moon Knight (Vol. 3) #2 (July 2006)
- Created by: Charlie Huston; David Finch

In-story information
- Species: Human
- Team affiliations: Committee
- Abilities: Can profile people at a glance, discovering relevant background information and important characteristics, allowing him to predict their reactions to certain situations.

The Profile is a fictional character appearing in American comic books published by Marvel Comics, an assassin and adversary of Moon Knight.

== Publication history ==
The character was created by writer Charlie Huston and penciler David Finch, and first appeared in Moon Knight (Vol. 3) #2 (July 2006) in the second chapter of "The Bottom".

== Fictional character biography ==
In "The Bottom", The Profile has been hired by The New Committee to assist them in their plans to turn Moon Knight into their personal assassin. Detached and somewhat amoral, he seems dismissive of Moon Knight as a hero. His plan was to injure Frenchie at some point in the future, but the committee strikes too soon and the plot reinvigorates a broken Moon Knight.

In a later occasion, Moon Knight has leaned on the Profile for help in finding his sidekick-turned-enemy Midnight. The Profile has attempted to further curry favor with Marc Spector by giving him advice on how to win back his girlfriend Marlene. He also aided Moon Knight by providing information that terrified a S.H.I.E.L.D. psychologist into approving Spector's registration as a superhero, but later he bailed one of the Whyos out of jail and the gang member was soon seen in the employ of Norman Osborn.

During the Dark Reign storyline, the Profile is hired by The Hood (in the presence of Norman Osborn) to help him in the hunting of Marc Spector.

During the Shadowland storyline, Daredevil (who had just become the leader of the Hand) hires Profile to fight Moon Knight. He is assisted in this task by a second avatar of Khonshu. It turns out that the second avatar of Khonshu that's helping Profile is actually Moon Knight's brother Randall Spector in the alias of Shadow Knight.

== Powers and abilities ==
The Profile is able to divine people's backgrounds and identify character traits and preferences simply by looking at them. This allows him to accurately predict their reactions to a variety of situations.

Moon Knight (Vol. 4) #4 suggested that he may be a mutant and confirms that he is not immune to his own powers. In an interview regarding Marvel's Shadowland crossover, writer Gregg Hurwitz characterized the nature of the Profile's powers as that of "... a brilliant, on-the-spot psychologist who can profile anyone he looks at...". However, in the Heroic Age: Villains special, he was implied to perhaps indeed be a mutant with the ability "...to see anyone's needs, wants, and desires...". His true status has yet to be confirmed at this time.

The Profile's power manifests as almost-psychedelic art and words surrounding a person, identifying their secrets, idiosyncrasies and other traits similar to a virtual-reality interface. His eyes seemed to be physically identifiable as "mutated" in his original appearance, but have since not been shown as such.

Although his powers are useful against humans, mutants, science experiments, and technology-powered superheroes, the Profile's accuracy is seriously compromised by genuine supernatural influence, such as that of Moon Knight's patron Khonshu. When Marc Spector donned his Moon Knight vestments, The Profile was stricken with fear when looking at him, but could read him like a book when in his civilian attire/identity.
