= Black Spectre =

Marvel Comics supervillain

Black Spectre is the name of several fictional characters appearing in American comic books published by Marvel Comics. The first Black Spectre is a supervillain who first appeared in Moon Knight #25 (Nov. 1982) and was created by writer Doug Moench and penciller Bill Sienkiewicz. The different incarnations of the character is one of the greatest enemies of the vigilante Moon Knight.

== Publication history ==
Black Spectre first appeared in the eponymous story from Moon Knight #25 (Nov. 1982) and was created by writer Doug Moench and penciller Bill Sienkiewicz.

Years later, writer Doug Moench developed his creation in the four part Moon Knight: The Resurrection War mini series (Feb.–April 1998), pencilled by Tommy Lee Edwards.

The character appeared in the 2006 Moon Knight series, in the arc entitled "God and Country", issues #15–19 (March–Aug. 2008), written by Mike Benson and pencilled by Mark Texeira.

Black Spectre has an entry in the Official Handbook of the Marvel Universe A to Z Update #2 (2010).

== Fictional biography ==
=== Black Spectre (Carson Knowles) ===
Black Spectre
- Carson Knowles as the Black Spectre. Art by Mark Texeira.

Publication information
- Publisher: Marvel Comics
- First appearance: Moon Knight 25 (Nov. 1982)
- Created by: Doug Moench (writer); Bill Sienkiewicz (penciller)

In-story information
- Alter ego: Carson Knowles

The Black Spectre was Carson Knowles, a Vietnam War veteran whose father was a politician. Upon returning home to New York City from military duties he discovered his wife left him and his son was dead. He could not find a job and decided to get revenge on the city he believed had abandoned and betrayed him. Inspired by Moon Knight, Knowles became the Black Spectre, a master criminal. He also decided to run for Mayor of New York City. Knowles was defeated by Moon Knight and sent to prison.

Later, Black Spectre joined together with Morpheus and Bushman, two other foes of Moon Knight. They intended to use the power of the statue of the Egyptian god Seth to curse diplomats at a U.N. conference.

Carson Knowles appeared again some time later, recently released from prison. He falls back into his ways as Black Spectre and attempts to, yet again, destroy Moon Knight and hurt the city. Knowles frames several murders on Moon Knight, putting him under scrutiny by S.H.I.E.L.D. Knowles then steals Stark nanotechnology and is about to launch an attack, but Moon Knight pushes him off a building to his death.

Black Spectre is among the deceased enemies of Moon Knight who are revived by Anubis to join the Legion of the Unliving led by Jackal Knight.

=== Ryan Trent ===
Carson Knowles's costume and identity are appropriated by Ryan Trent, a disgruntled member of the NYPD whom Moon Knight defeats in the deranged officer's first and only outing as the new Black Spectre.

Since he was a child, Ryan Trent was constantly undermined, having his decisions throughout his life continuously questioned. Even after he joined the NYPD, he did not feel he was good enough. When Moon Knight returned to New York City as a consultant for Detective Flint, Flint's preference over the vigilante caused Trent to finally break, and slowly descend into madness as he became obsessed with Moon Knight. Ryan began training himself, as well as he investigated about Moon Knight by interrogating former allies of him disguised as a S.H.I.E.L.D. agent. Using Carson Knowles, the Black Spectre, as an inspiration, Ryan aims to replace Moon Knight, believing that if he replaced Moon Knight and revealed himself to Flint, he would get be respected and get a promotion. In order to become even more similar to Moon Knight, who worked alone and had no ties to anybody, Trent murdered his wife. Now armed with equipment and a costume, Trent donned the mantle of Black Spectre and began attacking people and peeling their faces while yelling for Moon Knight. With Moon Knight's car finally arriving at his location, Black Spectre activated three I.E.D. planted in cars nearby to explode Moon Knight's car. Only two of them went off, but this was enough to destroy the vehicle. Black Spectre got out of the building he was hiding, expecting to find Moon Knight dead. However, Moon Knight arrived at the scene using his glider. Before the fight could get started, Trent proclaimed that he was going to kill Moon Knight so he could be loved. Then, the third I.E.D. went off and exploded next to Black Spectre and injured him. When Trent was asked who was he supposed to be, he presented himself as Black Spectre. Moon Knight ripped off his mask and explained to him and he did not want to be loved, because all those close to him suffered and died, and that because he worked alone he had always won. He then left Black Spectre and departed.

=== Robert Plesko ===
In Moon Knight #24 (2021), Morpheus reveals there is a new Black Spectre who was responsible for recent events. The following issue reveals that this Black Spectre has created a twisted version of the Midnight Mission, who intend to take care of a favor in exchange for a future debt. This same issue establishes that this is a different version of the character, as Carson Knowles remains dead and Ryan Trent is shown to be in prison with the villain Zodiac.

Black Spectre's true identity is revealed to be Robert Plesko of the Shadow Cabinet. After trapping Moon Knight on the roof of the Midnight Mission, Black Spectre wounded Moon Knight and revealed his plan to make the city go mad and kill itself. After Moon Knight died saving the city, Zodiac blamed Black Spectre for killing Moon Knight before he could as he plans to give Black Spectre the full experience of atrocity up close.

== Analysis on Black Spectre character ==
During his supervillain career, Black Spectre has always been an enemy of Moon Knight and is considered as one of the greatest enemies of the vigilante. In his first appearance, the character is depicted as the antithesis of Moon Knight. In her essay titled "Fight Scenes, Fight Scenes Everywhere … And Not a Stop to Think", Heidi MacDonald declared that the story "Black Spectre" is more than just a fist fight. She analyzed it and concluded "It is about the way that Moon Knight's fortunes descend while Black Spectre's rise, and the way that Moon Knight conquers his weakness while Black Spectre falls to them.".

In an interview with Comic Book Resources, Augie De Blieck Jr., the reviewer of the 2006 Moon Knight series, noted that "Moon Knight's rogues' gallery seems to play a decent supporting role in each issue". Writer Mike Benson explained that there were many adversaries that he would like to bring back but he kept the villains which he felt "could easily fit the tone of the book".

Dave Richards, reviewer for Comic Book Resources, analyzed the death of Black Spectre and explained that it was a turning point in Moon Knight's life. In its past adventures, the vigilante demonstrated that he had no guilty conscience about seriously harming criminals, but he did have a strong code against killing them. According to Richards, Mike Benson used this violent death to separate Moon Knight and Khonshu, the Egyptian God of Vengeance. Khonshu is a character which claims that Moon Knight is his Avatar, and must therefore do Khonshu's bidding. Mike Benson confirmed in an interview that these two characters "have had such a cantankerous relationship that they needed a little distance."

In his review of Moon Knight #19, Kevin Powers, reviewer for Comics Bulletin, also noted "The ending of this issue is extremely well done and effectively concludes the main Khonshu-involved storyline that began with Charlie Huston". He said that it is an interesting evolution that could lead to storylines for future issues where reactions from his supporting cast could be explored. Powers stated that the most important moment is Black Spectre's dialogue during their last fight. It helped understand the character's desires. According to the reviewer, Carson Knowles "wants the people to love him; he wants to be their leader like he should have been back in the day when he ran for mayor, before becoming a villain". Even if Black Spectre is more powerful than the vigilante, he's also a classic villain whose ego often serves as his downfall.

== In other media ==
An unidentified incarnation of Black Spectre appears in Marvel Pinball: Vengeance and Virtue.
