= Arsenal (Nimrod Strange) =

Arsenal is a fictional character appearing in American comic books published by Marvel Comics. The character first appeared in Moon Knight #17 (1981).

== Fictional character biography ==
Arsenal led his own army to destroy the governments of the world, and was defeated by Moon Knight.
