= Shadow Knight (character) =

Marvel Comics supervillain

- Shadow Knight as he appears on the textless cover of Shadowland: Moon Knight (September 2010). Art by Francesco Mattina.

Publication information
- Publisher: Marvel Comics
- First appearance: As Hatchet-Man: Hulk Magazine #17 (October 1979); As Shadow Knight: Marc Spector: Moon Knight #37 (February 1992)
- Created by: Doug Moench; Bill Sienkiewicz

In-story information
- Full name: Randall Spector
- Species: Hellbent
- Team affiliations: Committee; Cult of the Jackal; Legion of the Unliving
- Notable aliases: Hatchet-Man; Night Shadow; Shadowknight
- Abilities: Enhanced strength similar to Moon Knight, can emit energy blasts from eyes

Shadow Knight (Randall Spector) is a supervillain appearing in American comic books published by Marvel Comics, commonly as an adversary of his brother, the superhero Moon Knight.

A young Randall makes his live-action debut in the Marvel Cinematic Universe (MCU) television miniseries Moon Knight, played by Claudio Fabian Contreras.

== Publication history ==
Randall Spector was introduced in the "backup feature" of Hulk! Magazine #17 in October 1979 as a mysterious serial killer known as the Hatchet-Man who violently murders nurses around New York City. Moon Knight attempts to stop the murders and eventually deduces that the killer is his estranged brother Randall. In #18, Moon Knight confronts his brother in Central Park and a fight ensues in which Randall is killed. This was later retconned by writer Howard Mackie to be an impostor, and in Marc Spector: Moon Knight #33 and #35–38, Randall returns. During the Shadowland crossover, writer Gregg Hurwitz and artist Ron Garney wrote a three-issue limited series where Moon Knight confronts his brother. This is also the first time Randall is referred to as Marc's younger brother; in all previous appearances, Randall was the older sibling.

== Fictional character biography ==
Spector was born in Chicago, Illinois and is the son of Elias Spector, a rabbi who survived Nazi persecution, and Mrs. Spector (first name unknown). Randall and Marc Spector are brothers, and at times both have been cast as the avatars of the Egyptian moon god Khonshu. Randall and Marc join the Marine Corps together and eventually operate as mercenaries in northern Italy. After Randall kills Marc's girlfriend, Marc confronts him and throws a grenade at his position. Randall is presumed dead.

Randall later returns to New York on a murder spree focused on killing nurses with a hatchet. Moon Knight uses his girlfriend Marlene Alraune as bait, but he cannot stop being stabbed. He swears revenge, but cannot bring himself to kill his brother. Randall jumps at Marc, but he dodges and Randall impales himself on a tree branch.

It is later revealed that the person killed was not Randall, but an impostor with implanted memories. Randall is actually a member of the Cult of Khonshu, having been mystically enhanced with impenetrable skin and superhuman strength by Princess Nephthys.

During the Shadowland storyline, Randall mysteriously re-emerges as the Shadow Knight, convinced by Profile that he is Khonshu's next avatar on Earth. Sharing essentially all of Moon Knight's powers as well as the ability to emit radioactive blasts from his eyes, the two are almost evenly matched. The two eventually meet up in New Orleans following the mysterious Sapphire Crescent. Randall ends up using a hostage as a shield with a bomb, and Moon Knight is out of throwing crescents; however, Moon Knight launches the Sapphire Crescent and kills his brother.

Shadow Knight returns as a revenant under the direction of the Blasphemy Cartel, enemies of Clea Strange. His body is taken over by a multitude of rebellious dead souls and battles Clea and her mother Umar.

Shadow Knight returns from the dead again and became a member of the Cult of the Jackal as Jackal Knight. With help from Anubis' sorcery, Jackal Knight resurrects the deceased Moon Knight villains Black Spectre, Chainsaw, Master Sniper, Midnight, Plasma, and Taurus, who form a new incarnation of the Legion of the Unliving. They target Khalil Nasser, the host of Osiris. After Nasser sacrifices himself to free Osiris, Jackal Knight's plans are thwarted.

== Powers and abilities ==
Nepthys' "lunar treatments" granted Shadow Knight superhuman strength and external durability, although his internal organs have normal durability. He possesses extensive training in espionage and military combat tactics. However, he was barely able to access these skills after becoming insane.

Randall's hellbent genes give him the ability to absorb other people's life force to enhance himself.

=== Equipment ===
As the Hatchet-Man, he used an off-the-shelf Halloween mask to hide his face.

As Shadow Knight, he wore Kevlar body armor for further protection.

=== Weapons ===
Wooden-handled hatchet.

== In other media ==
A young Randall Spector appears in flashbacks in the Moon Knight episode "Asylum", portrayed by Claudio Fabian Contreras. This version died in a flooding cave that he and his older brother Marc found during a family trip. Consumed by the loss of Randall, Wendy blamed Marc for Randall's death, which caused her to become abusive towards Marc. Marc consequently developed dissociative identity disorder and created the identity of Steven Grant to protect himself from Wendy. When Marc and Grant end up in the Duat, they have a brief encounter with Randall.
