= List of The Bernie Mac Show episodes =

The following is a list of episodes for the Fox sitcom The Bernie Mac Show. The show ran for five seasons from 2001 to 2006, with 104 episodes produced.

== Series overview ==
| Season | Episodes | Originally released | |
| Season | Episodes | First released | Last released |
|---|---|---|---|
| 1 | 22 | November 14, 2001 | May 15, 2002 |
| 2 | 22 | September 18, 2002 | May 14, 2003 |
| 3 | 22 | November 30, 2003 | June 29, 2004 |
| 4 | 16 | September 8, 2004 | April 8, 2005 |
| 5 | 22 | September 23, 2005 | April 14, 2006 |

== Episodes ==
=== Season 1 (2001–02) ===
| No. overall | No. in season | Title | Directed by | Written by | Original release date | Prod. code | Viewers (millions) |
|---|---|---|---|---|---|---|---|
| 1 | 1 | "Pilot (Mr. Bernie Mac; The River Jordan; Uncle Daddy)" | Ken Kwapis | Larry Wilmore | November 14, 2001 | 08-01-101 | 11.47 |
Bernie and Wanda take the kids in.
| 2 | 2 | "Now You Got It (It’s My Party, I’ll Invite Who I Want To; Staying Alive; The Longest Day)" | Ken Kwapis | Teri Schaffer | November 14, 2001 | 08-01-102 | 12.38 |
In the wake of Bryana's birthday party, Bernie's plans to go to Las Vegas are derailed when he and the kids get sick.
| 3 | 3 | "The Main Event" | Linda Mendoza | Marc Abrams & Michael Benson | November 21, 2001 | 08-01-105 | 9.26 |
Jordan can't defend himself from bullies.
| 4 | 4 | "Bernie Mac, Ladies Man (He’s a Ladies Man; He’s a Lady-Man; He’s a Man, Ladies!)" | Lee Shallat-Chemel | Kriss Turner | November 28, 2001 | 08-01-107 | 11.24 |
Bernie doesn’t like being known as a stay-at-home dad.
| 5 | 5 | "Saving Bernie Mac" | Stan Lathan | Kriss Turner | December 5, 2001 | 08-01-104 | 10.04 |
The family goes to church.
| 6 | 6 | "Here to Stay (Renters; Roomates; Family)" | Sam Weisman | Steve Tompkins | December 12, 2001 | 08-01-106 | 10.02 |
Bernie treats the kids like family.
| 7 | 7 | "A Christmas Story" | John Fortenberry | Marc Abrams & Michael Benson | December 19, 2001 | 08-01-108 | 9.58 |
Bryana brings home a stray dog.
| 8 | 8 | "Starting School" | David Grossman | Larry Wilmore | January 2, 2002 | 08-01-103 | 11.60 |
Bernie and Wanda enroll the kids in school.
| 9 | 9 | "Hot! Hot! Hot!" | Linda Mendoza | Robert Bruce | January 16, 2002 | 08-01-109 | 10.42 |
Bernie's AC breaks down.
| 10 | 10 | "Wanda's Week Off" | Ken Kwapis | Teri Schaffer | January 23, 2002 | 08-01-110 | 11.83 |
Wanda wants to have a baby.
| 11 | 11 | "The King and I" | Ken Kwapis | Steve Tompkins | January 30, 2002 | 08-01-113 | 10.76 |
Jordan and Bryana go to Vanessa instead of Bernie.
| 12 | 12 | "Hall of Fame" | Linda Mendoza | Marc Abrams & Michael Benson | February 6, 2002 | 08-01-114 | 10.83 |
Jordan plays football for a trophy in hopes to impress Bernie and receive a place in his very own Hall of Fame.
| 13 | 13 | "Handle Your Business" | Robert Berlinger | Warren Hutcherson | February 13, 2002 | 08-01-112 | 9.35 |
Bernie talks bad about the family.
| 14 | 14 | "Back in the Day" | Lee Shallat-Chemel | Jeffrey Bushell | February 20, 2002 | 08-01-115 | 9.02 |
Bernie is worried that he's getting old.
| 15 | 15 | "Lock Down" | David Grossman | Teri Schaffer | March 6, 2002 | 08-01-116 | 10.80 |
A robbery occurs at Bernie's house.
| 16 | 16 | "Mac 101" | Lee Shallat-Chemel | Kriss Turner | March 27, 2002 | 08-01-117 | 9.73 |
Bernie goes over to Shannon's house.
| 17 | 17 | "If I Were N-Riched Man" | Ken Whittingham | Warren Hutcherson | April 3, 2002 | 08-01-118 | 8.07 |
Bryana overhears Bernie say the N-word and repeats it at school.
| 18 | 18 | "Stop Having Sex" | Lee Shallat-Chemel | Warren Hutcherson | April 17, 2002 | 08-01-111 | 8.90 |
Bernie is worried that the kids are being exposed to things that they are too young to handle.
| 19 | 19 | "Secrets and Lies" | Robert Berlinger | Marc Abrams, Michael Benson & Jeffrey Bushell | May 1, 2002 | 08-01-120 | 8.53 |
Bernie and Jordan secretly go to the Clipper game.
| 20 | 20 | "Kelly's Heroes" | Lee Shallat-Chemel | Steve Tompkins | May 8, 2002 | 08-01-119 | 9.50 |
Kelly takes Bernie's role as an uncle.
| 21 | 21 | "Sweet Home Chicago" | Lee Shallat-Chemel | Story by : Larry Wilmore; Teleplay by : Warren Hutcherson & Kriss Turner | May 15, 2002 | 08-01-121 | 8.62 |
| 22 | 22 | "Sweet Home Chicago" | Lee Shallat-Chemel | Story by : Larry Wilmore; Teleplay by : Steve Tompkins & Teri Schaffer | May 15, 2002 | 08-01-122 | 8.62 |
Bernie takes the family back to Chicago for a funeral. The kids realize this is a chance to see their mother again. Cousin D causes problems for Bernie. Vanessa attempts to find her mother.

=== Season 2 (2002–03) ===
| No. overall | No. in season | Title | Directed by | Written by | Original release date | Prod. code | Viewers (millions) |
|---|---|---|---|---|---|---|---|
| 23 | 1 | "Keep It on the Short Grass" | Ken Kwapis | Marc Abrams & Michael Benson | September 18, 2002 | 08-02-201 | 10.16 |
Bernie plays at a golf tournament, and gets upstaged by Wanda.
| 24 | 2 | "Goodbye Dolly" | Reginald Hudlin | Steve Tompkins | September 25, 2002 | 08-02-202 | 7.91 |
Bernie is convinced that Bryana should give up her favorite doll.
| 25 | 3 | "Carfool" | Jamie Babbit | David Flebotte | October 30, 2002 | 08-02-203 | 8.61 |
Carpool complications wreck Bernie.
| 26 | 4 | "Mac Local 137" | Lee Shallat-Chemel | Jerry Collins | November 6, 2002 | 08-02-205 | 8.02 |
The kids go on strike.
| 27 | 5 | "Welcome to the Jungle" | Allison Liddi | Bobby Gaylor | November 13, 2002 | 08-02-210 | 7.65 |
Jordan brings home a snake.
| 28 | 6 | "Bernie Mac Dance Party" | Michael Spiller | Kriss Turner | November 20, 2002 | 08-02-211 | 8.34 |
Bernie goes to a father-daughter dance.
| 29 | 7 | "Tryptophan-tasy" | Kevin Bray | Jeffrey Bushell | November 27, 2002 | 08-02-209 | 7.41 |
Bernie has a fever dream.
| 30 | 8 | "The United Front" | Ken Whittingham | Teri Schaffer | December 4, 2002 | 08-02-204 | 8.43 |
Bernie and Wanda strive to present a united front.
| 31 | 9 | "The Sweet Life" | Reginald Hudlin | Paul Lieberstein | December 11, 2002 | 08-02-208 | 8.09 |
Bernie has high cholesterol.
| 32 | 10 | "Sin Cup" | Ken Kwapis | Warren Hutcherson | January 15, 2003 | 08-02-206 | 6.54 |
Jordan receives a lecture on sin.
| 33 | 11 | "Bernie Mac Rope-a-Dope" | Ken Kwapis | Kriss Turner | February 5, 2003 | 08-02-216 | 11.79 |
Bernie offends Wanda's boss.
| 34 | 12 | "Magic Jordan" | Gina Prince-Bythewood | Steve Tompkins | February 12, 2003 | 08-02-213 | 10.66 |
Jordan plans to impress one of Nessa’s friends with magic.
| 35 | 13 | "Raging Election" | Lee Shallat-Chemel | Steve Tompkins | February 26, 2003 | 08-02-218 | 11.54 |
Bernie helps Vanessa win an election.
| 36 | 14 | "Leaving Los Angeles" | Reginald Hudlin | Marc Abrams & Michael Benson | March 12, 2003 | 08-02-217 | 11.08 |
Bernie is Vegas-bound again.
| 37 | 15 | "Pink Gold" | Michael Spiller | Warren Hutcherson | March 19, 2003 | 08-02-221 | 11.22 |
The kids get pinkeye.
| 38 | 16 | "Chess Wars" | Lee Shallat-Chemel | Marc Abrams & Michael Benson | April 9, 2003 | 08-02-214 | 12.94 |
Vanessa wants to wear makeup; Jordan sneaks to a paintball game; Bryana wants a new doll.
| 39 | 17 | "The Incredible Bulk" | Victor Nelli, Jr. | Nguyen Orange | April 16, 2003 | 08-02-215 | 13.04 |
After getting frustrated over running out of certain food items constantly, Bernie becomes obsessed with buying food in bulk.
| 40 | 18 | "Maid Man" | Lee Shallat-Chemel | Jeffrey Bushell | April 23, 2003 | 08-02-207 | 12.70 |
Bernie hires a maid.
| 41 | 19 | "Nut Job" | Ken Kwapis | Paul Lieberstein | April 30, 2003 | 08-02-212 | 13.77 |
Bernie has the kids doing different activities.
| 42 | 20 | "The Other Sister" | Lee Shallat-Chemel | David Flebotte | May 7, 2003 | 08-02-220 | 13.74 |
Bernie's sister turns the household upside-down.
| 43 | 21 | "Meet the Grandparents" | Reginald Hudlin | Jerry Collins & Teri Schaffer | May 7, 2003 | 08-02-219 | 11.51 |
Wanda forces Bernie and her father to get along with each other.
| 44 | 22 | "For a Few Dollars More" | Ken Whittingham | Bobby Gaylor | May 14, 2003 | 08-02-222 | 15.84 |
Bernie and another neighbor host their kids' birthday parties on the same day.

=== Season 3 (2003–04) ===
| No. overall | No. in season | Title | Directed by | Written by | Original release date | Prod. code | Viewers (millions) |
|---|---|---|---|---|---|---|---|
| 45 | 1 | "Eye of the Tiger" | Victor Nelli, Jr. | Richard Appel | November 30, 2003 | 08-03-309 | 10.37 |
To please his Uncle Bernie, Jordan tries out for the basketball team, but the coach decides he is better suited for rhythmic gymnastics.
| 46 | 2 | "Love Thy Nephew" | Robert Berlinger | Teri Schaffer | December 7, 2003 | 08-03-301 | 9.31 |
Bernie and Jordan build a treehouse together.
| 47 | 3 | "Road to Tradition" | Ken Whittingham | Jerry Collins | December 14, 2003 | 08-03-313 | 9.13 |
Bernie wants to have a traditional family Christmas for the kids.
| 48 | 4 | "Laughing Matters" | Lee Shallat-Chemel | Marc Abrams & Michael Benson | December 21, 2003 | 08-03-303 | 7.66 |
Bernie lands the lead role in a dramatic movie; Jordan is upset when he has to attend daycare after school.
| 49 | 5 | "Hair Jordan" | Michael Spiller | Saladin K. Patterson | January 4, 2004 | 08-03-312 | 8.53 |
Bernie takes Jordan to his favorite barbershop.
| 50 | 6 | "Love Bug" | Reginald Hudlin | Kate Angelo | January 11, 2004 | 08-03-311 | 11.39 |
When Vanessa brings home her first boyfriend, Bernie wants to make sure that they don’t get any alone-time together.
| 51 | 7 | "It's a Wonderful Wife" | Reginald Hudlin | Teri Schaffer | January 25, 2004 | 08-03-306 | 7.97 |
Bernie’s routine is disrupted when Wanda quits her job.
| 52 | 8 | "Family Reunion" | Robert Berlinger | Teri Schaffer | February 8, 2004 | 08-03-310 | 6.10 |
Bernie and Wanda host the Mac Family Reunion.
| 53 | 9 | "Droobie or Not Droobie" | Michael Spiller | John Riggi | February 15, 2004 | 08-03-308 | 7.03 |
Bryana is upset when Bernie takes a villainous role opposite her favorite character: a friendly dinosaur.
| 54 | 10 | "J-O-R-D-A-N Spells Funny" | Ken Kwapis | Roger Reitzel | February 22, 2004 | 08-03-315 | 7.69 |
Jordan enters the school spelling contest.
| 55 | 11 | "Make Room for Caddy" | Victor Nelli, Jr. | Saladin K. Patterson | March 7, 2004 | 08-03-304 | 8.15 |
Wanda asks Bernie to try and get along with her father.
| 56 | 12 | "Saving Sgt. Tompkins" | Ken Whittingham | Jacqui Clay | March 14, 2004 | 08-03-307 | 7.26 |
Jordan asks about his real father. Bernie lies to the boy, and this upsets Vanessa.
| 57 | 13 | "It's Mac-ademic" | Victor Nelli, Jr. | Fred Johnson | March 22, 2004 | 08-03-314 | 5.94 |
Bernie questions the teaching methods at Bryana’s school.
| 58 | 14 | "The Getaway" | Linda Mendoza | Warren Hutcherson | March 29, 2004 | 08-03-305 | 6.37 |
Bernie takes the family on vacation to San Diego, but it’s Las Vegas that is really on his mind.
| 59 | 15 | "Easy Rider" | Linda Mendoza | Nguyen Orange | April 5, 2004 | 08-03-319 | 4.59 |
Bernie has an accident while riding a motorcycle.
| 60 | 16 | "Who's That Lady?" | Ken Whittingham | Warren Hutcherson & Teri Schaffer | April 12, 2004 | 08-03-322 | 6.11 |
Wanda is feeling left out when Bernie has a new female friend.
| 61 | 17 | "Mac-intations" | Ken Whittingham | Brian Egan | April 12, 2004 | 08-03-318 | 6.25 |
Bernie is always playing pranks on the family.
| 62 | 18 | "That Old Mac Magic" | Robert Berlinger | Richard Appel | April 26, 2004 | 08-03-320 | 4.24 |
Jordan stars in a TV commercial and learns that show business can be cruel.
| 63 | 19 | "The Talk" | Ken Kwapis | Marc Abrams & Michael Benson | April 26, 2004 | 08-03-317 | 4.96 |
Wanda tells Bernie that its time for Jordan to learn about “the birds and the bees.”
| 64 | 20 | "Five Stages of Bryana" | Michael Spiller | John Riggi | June 15, 2004 | 08-03-316 | 3.96 |
Bernie and Wanda consult a child therapist to determine what is making Bryana suddenly throw tantrums, become a bully at school and fight with her siblings at home.
| 65 | 21 | "Go Bernie, It's Your Birthday" | Reginald Hudlin | Denise Downer | June 22, 2004 | 08-03-321 | 4.54 |
It’s Bernie’s birthday, and the family doesn’t seem to take much notice.
| 66 | 22 | "Thanksgiving" | Reginald Hudlin | Kate Angelo | June 29, 2004 | 08-03-302 | 3.64 |
Vanessa's teacher, a vegetarian, invites the Mac family to Thanksgiving dinner.

=== Season 4 (2004–05) ===
| No. overall | No. in season | Title | Directed by | Written by | Original release date | Prod. code | Viewers (millions) |
|---|---|---|---|---|---|---|---|
| 67 | 1 | "Big Brother" | Linda Mendoza | Peter B. Aronson and Marc Abrams & Michael Benson | September 8, 2004 | 08-04-404 | 6.58 |
Bernie sneaks into Vanessa's journal and he finds out that she once smoked, which makes him buy security cameras to watch what the family's doing, but Bernie gets more than what he bargained for. Guest appearance by Snoop Dogg.
| 68 | 2 | "Stiff Upper Lip" | Warren Hutcherson | Richard Appel & Warren Hutcherson | September 15, 2004 | 08-04-403 | 5.48 |
Bernie decides that 8-year-old Bryana is too old to be riding her bike with training wheels. Alas, she crashes, and a guilty Bernie volunteers to take her class to the museum. Meanwhile, Jordan steals an old cast from the hospital and wears it at school to get out of gym class.
| 69 | 3 | "Being Bernie Mac" | Victor Nelli, Jr. | Jacqui Clay & Jerry Collins | September 22, 2004 | 08-04-401 | 5.14 |
Bernie is hoping for some peace and quiet as he prepares for a performance that night, but he must deal with the kids when Wanda's business meeting runs long.
| 70 | 4 | "Mac Overdrive" | Ken Whittingham | Kate Angelo & John Riggi | September 29, 2004 | 08-04-402 | 5.47 |
Bernie gives Vanessa driving lessons, but he goes overboard while teaching Vanessa. Out of nowhere, he gets his truck towed away and he also gets glasses.
| 71 | 5 | "My Privacy" | Victor Nelli, Jr. | Jerry Collins | January 14, 2005 | 08-04-405 | 4.82 |
Bryana accidentally walks in on Bernie getting ready for his bath. Vanessa is not happy when Bryana moves into her room. Bernie and Wanda decide that it may be time to remodel the house, much to the dismay of Bernie's wallet.
| 72 | 6 | "Who Gives This Bride" | Reginald Hudlin | Teri Schaffer | January 14, 2005 | 08-04-406 | 5.55 |
Bernie's sister announces that she and her fiance, Monroe (Cedric Yarbrough) are eloping to Las Vegas. Wanda offers to have the wedding at the Mac house.
| 73 | 7 | "Nerdy Mac" | Linda Mendoza | Richard Appel | January 21, 2005 | 08-04-407 | 4.69 |
Bernie and Wanda are not satisfied with Bryana's test scores, and decide to enroll her at Jordan's school. As a result, Jordan is depressed because the kids at school think he's a nerd.
| 74 | 8 | "Stone Nuts" | Victor Nelli, Jr. | Steve Tompkins | January 28, 2005 | 08-04-408 | 4.34 |
Jordan wants to be more popular in school, so Bernie teaches him to gamble, but the trick soon backfires. Wanda's birthday is coming up, and Bernie searches for a rare cognac-colored diamond.
| 75 | 9 | "Jack & Jacqueline" | Lee Shallat-Chemel | Antonia F. March & Jacqueline McKinley | February 4, 2005 | 08-04-409 | 4.13 |
Wanda decides to enroll the kids in an organization that teaches social skills to young people, with Vanessa instantly making new friends.
| 76 | 10 | "Manchild in Vanessa Land" | David Grossman | Fred Johnson | February 11, 2005 | 08-04-410 | 5.37 |
Vanessa's new boyfriend is 18 years old, and has a child by a former girlfriend.
| 77 | 11 | "You Don't Know Squad" | Victor Nelli, Jr. | Antonia F. March & Jacqueline McKinley | February 18, 2005 | 08-04-411 | 4.66 |
Bernie is happy that Vanessa has joined the Spirit Squad, until he sees the racey costumes and provocative routines. Jordan enlists Bryana and her friends to help him sell a product.
| 78 | 12 | "You Got Served" | Linda Mendoza | Brian Egan | February 25, 2005 | 08-04-412 | 4.20 |
Bryana's birthday party results in a lawsuit after she bounces high in the moon house and accidentally sending the girl flying. When Bernie hears about this, he tries to find a way to prevent the lawsuit from happening.
| 79 | 13 | "I Don't Wanna Be a Playa No More" | Warren Hutcherson | Teri Schaffer | March 11, 2005 | 08-04-413 | 5.50 |
When Jordan develops a crush on a girl, Bernie teaches Jordan how to be a "player". Vanessa wants to attend a hip-hop concert.
| 80 | 14 | "The Big Picture" | Ken Whittingham | Steve Tompkins | March 18, 2005 | 08-04-414 | 3.91 |
Bernie hires a personal assistant. WWE World Heavyweight Champion Triple H becomes the victim of Jordan's prank phone calls.
| 81 | 15 | "The Music Mac" | Reginald Hudlin | Story by : Amanda K. Montgomery; Teleplay by : Courtney Kemp Agboh | April 1, 2005 | 08-04-415 | 4.22 |
Bernie wants to encourage Vanessa's burgeoning musical talent. Guest appearance by Isaac Hayes.
| 82 | 16 | "Walk Like a Man" | Warren Hutcherson | Corey Nickerson | April 8, 2005 | 08-04-416 | 4.41 |
Bernie feels that Jordan is ready to walk home from school by himself, but his walk home days are over after Jordan and his friends pick on a crabby neighbor. Vanessa has a wardrobe malfunction while swimming.

=== Season 5 (2005–06) ===
| No. overall | No. in season | Title | Directed by | Written by | Original release date | Prod. code | Viewers (millions) |
|---|---|---|---|---|---|---|---|
| 83 | 1 | "Father Knows Best" | Millicent Shelton | Teri Schaffer | September 23, 2005 | 08-05-502 | 3.48 |
Bryana's biological father, Bryan (Anthony Anderson) shows up and disrupts the little girl's routine.
| 84 | 2 | "Wrestling with a Sticky Situation" | Victor Nelli, Jr. | Jerry Collins | September 23, 2005 | 08-05-501 | 3.95 |
Jordan joins the wrestling team and Bernie seeks advice from wrestling champion "Stone Cold" Steve Austin. Wanda gets frustrated with Vanessa for borrowing her clothes.
| 85 | 3 | "Marathon Mac" | Victor Nelli, Jr. | Marc Abrams & Michael Benson | September 30, 2005 | 08-04-422 | 3.80 |
Bernie overtrains for a local marathon, luckily, Vanessa fills in for him. Later in the race, Bernie provokes Vanessa by frequently calling her to see how she's doing. Guest appearances by Adam Carolla and Charles Barkley. (This episode was originally produced for season 4.)
| 86 | 4 | "The Big Payback" | Victor Nelli, Jr. | Antonia F. March & Jacqueline McKinley | October 7, 2005 | 08-05-503 | 3.86 |
Vanessa spends her money on shoes after Bernie specifically told her not to, which forces Bernie to have Vanessa work in his business. Guest appearance by Karen Malina White.
| 87 | 5 | "Car Wars" | Ken Whittingham | Fred Johnson | October 21, 2005 | 08-05-505 | 4.00 |
Vanessa rents a car when Bernie said she can't have one.
| 88 | 6 | "Night of Terror" | Warren Hutcherson | Corey Nickerson | October 28, 2005 | 08-05-504 | 3.71 |
Jordan watches an R-rated movie while Wanda and Bernie go out for a night on the town, and the next thing is, he thinks zombies might attack the house.
| 89 | 7 | "For Whom the Belt Tolls" | Roger Nygard | Saladin K. Patterson | November 4, 2005 | 08-05-506 | 3.85 |
Bernie and Wanda are about tired of telling the kids to stop doing things they are not supposed to do, so Bernie teaches Wanda how to use Big Mama's belt.
| 90 | 8 | "Pop Pop Goes the Weasel" | Millicent Shelton | Teri Schaffer & Steve Tompkins | November 11, 2005 | 08-05-507 | 3.88 |
A possum breaks out in the house scaring Bernie.
| 91 | 9 | "Prison Break" | Keith Truesdell | Antonia F. March & Jacqueline McKinley | November 18, 2005 | 08-05-508 | 3.99 |
Bernie gets a call from the catholic school due to Jordan and Bryana's bad behavior (Jordan was dared to touch a girl's behind, but it ended up accidentally touching a nun's behind, and Bryana forged Bernie's signature on her homework assignment). Bernie then puts them on severe punishment. This eventually angered Wanda, who attempts to take the children off of punishment by taking them to a festival. But when they mishave, she winds up punishing them. Meanwhile, Vanessa hosts a pool party when she was supposed to be studying and caught by Bernie. The trio eventually get locked in Bernie's basement. Guest appearance by: Mablean Ephriam
| 92 | 10 | "Some Church Bull" | Lee Shallat-Chemel | Jerry Collins | December 2, 2005 | 08-04-417 | 3.17 |
The family goes to a church retreat and at the end, everyone comes home angered. (This episode was originally produced for season 4.)
| 93 | 11 | "Sorely Missed" | Reginald Hudlin | Warren Hutcherson | December 16, 2005 | 08-04-418 | 3.51 |
Wanda and Bernie need time alone and Bryana doesn't remember her mother. (This episode was originally produced for season 4.)
| 94 | 12 | "Fumes of Detente" | Lee Shallat-Chemel | Fred Johnson | January 6, 2006 | 08-04-419 | 4.04 |
Vanessa's old friend from Chicago visits. (This episode was originally produced for season 4.)
| 95 | 13 | "Exercise in Fertility: Part 1" | Linda Mendoza | Marc Abrams & Michael Benson | January 13, 2006 | 08-04-420 | 3.82 |
Wanda says she's about to be pregnant and Bernie springs into action, and the kids seem concerned. (This episode was originally produced for season 4.)
| 96 | 14 | "Exercise in Fertility: Part 2" | Ken Whittingham | Peter B. Aronson and Marc Abrams & Michael Benson | January 20, 2006 | 08-04-421 | 3.54 |
Bernie and Wanda go to a fertility specialist. The kids are worried that a new addition to the family will leave them out in the cold. (This episode was originally produced for season 4.)
| 97 | 15 | "Fantasy Football" | Rusty Cundieff | Brian Egan & Steve Tompkins | January 27, 2006 | 08-05-509 | 4.19 |
Bernie and Jordan join a fantasy football league, But their frequent disagreements affect their relationship. Meanwhile, Bryana becomes addicted to wearing makeup, and she gets caught wearing makeup at school. Guest appearances by Dick Butkus and Pat Finn.
| 98 | 16 | "Bar Mitzvah Crashers" | Linda Mendoza | Michael Caine & Angela Yarbrough | February 3, 2006 | 08-05-512 | 3.20 |
Bryana listens into Vanessa and Wanda's conversations, and at Jordan's friend's party, she opens her big mouth.
| 99 | 17 | "Who's Your Mama?" | Linda Mendoza | Jerry Collins | March 31, 2006 | 08-05-514 | 3.08 |
Bryan fills in for Wanda while she's on a business trip.
| 100 | 18 | "What Would Jason Do?" | Roger Nygard | Story by : Jason M. Palmer; Teleplay by : Saladin K. Patterson | March 31, 2006 | 08-05-510 | 3.09 |
Two boys are trying to take Vanessa to a senior prom, and while out on a date, Bernie and Wanda spy on them.
| 101 | 19 | "It's Never as Bad as the First Time" | Keith Truesdell | Fred Johnson | April 7, 2006 | 08-05-513 | 3.21 |
Jordan dates a cheerleader which wows Bernie, but when the breakup happens, Bernie has something to say. Guest appearance by Jon Garland.
| 102 | 20 | "Spinning Wheels" | Victor Nelli, Jr. | Corey Nickerson | April 7, 2006 | 08-05-511 | 3.35 |
Wanda's sister, Valerie (Shar Jackson) comes for a visit and throws a roller party for her.
| 103 | 21 | "Growing Pains" | Lee Shallat-Chemel | Warren Hutcherson & Saladin K. Patterson | April 14, 2006 | 08-05-515 | 3.14 |
Vanessa decides to work extra shifts instead of studying for her SATs.
| 104 | 22 | "Bernie's Angels" | Ken Kwapis | Teri Schaffer & Steve Tompkins | April 14, 2006 | 08-05-516 | 3.13 |
In the series finale, after having a near-death experience involving the microwave, Bernie decides to turn his life around and starts being nicer and overly sensitive. Meanwhile, Jordan begins to take advantage of Bernie's new attitude. Vanessa is still working on finding a good college but she doesn't want Bernie's help. Bryana has to learn what belongs in a microwave and what doesn't since she was the one responsible for Bernie's near-death experience. In the end, Bernie discovers that Jordan has been using him and he reconciles with Vanessa. In the final scene, Bernie takes back the iPod he bought for Jordan and delivers a farewell message to "America". Mac died a couple of years later from pneumonia on August 9, 2008.
