= Laurence Campbell =

British comics artist

- Areas: Penciller, Inker
- Notable works: Synnamon

Laurence Campbell is a British comics artist best known for his work in 2000 AD, but he has also recently received attention from his work for Marvel.

== Biography ==
Campbell started evening courses at the London Cartoon Centre and then studied graphic design at Central Saint Martins College of Art and Design. He got early comics work at Caliber Comics, on their anthology Negative Burn as well as titles on their New Worlds imprint, like Red Diaries.

Starting in 2000, he worked at 2000 AD, collaborating there, and at Image Comics, with writers Colin Clayton and Chris Dows on titles like Bison and Synnamon. He also worked with Rob Williams on Breathing Space.

Since 2005, he has been working for Marvel Comics, starting with a Christmas Special written by Williams. He then worked on the Punisher Annual before becoming the artist on a story in Punisher for Marvel MAX.

== Bibliography ==
Comics work includes:

- Negative Burn (with Paul Carstairs, Caliber Comics):
  - "Norma Jean's Knickers" (in Negative Burn #19, 1995)
  - "The Day Job" (inks, with pencils by Katrin Geilhausen, in Negative Burn #44, 1997)
- Raven Chronicles #13 (pencils, with Scott Andrews and inks by Tim Perkins, New Worlds, Caliber Comics, 1995)
- The Red Diaries (pencils, with Gary Reed and inks by Larry Shuput, 4-issue mini-series, New Worlds, Caliber Comics, 1997)
- Judge Dredd:
  - "The Des Lynham Story" (with John Wagner, in 2000 AD #1482, 2000)
  - "Dominoes" (pencils, with script by Simon Spurrier and inks by Kris Justice, in 2000 AD #1482, 2006)
  - "Splashdown" (pencils, with script by Simon Spurrier and inks by Kris Justice, in Judge Dredd Megazine #245, 2006)
- DeMarco: "DeMarco PI" (pencils, with script by Robbie Morrison and inks by Dylan Teague, in Judge Dredd Megazine #3.70-3.71, 2000)
- Disciples: Wheel of Fortune (pencils, with writers Colin Clayton/Chris Dows and inks by Larry Shuput, one-shot, Image Comics, 2001)
- Bison (pencils, with writers Colin Clayton/Chris Dows and inks by Lee Townsend, in 2000 AD #1301-1309, 2001, collected in Bison ISBN 1-904265-13-8)
- Synnamon (with writers Colin Clayton/Chris Dows):
  - "Facing Mecha" (pencils, with inks by Lee Townsend, in 2000 AD #1362-1370, 2003)
  - "Recalibration" (pencils, with inks by David Roach, in 2000 AD #1416-1418, 2004)
- Past Imperfect: "Cosmonaut X" (pencils, with script by Arthur Wyatt and inks by Kris Justice, in 2000 AD #1376, 2004)
- Breathing Space (pencils, with script by Rob Williams and inks by Lee Townsend, in 2000 AD #1453-1459, 2005)
- Wolverine #49 (with Rob Williams, Special Double-Sized X-Mas Special, 2006, Marvel Comics, collected in Wolverine: Blood and Sorrow, June 2007, ISBN 0-7851-2607-4)
- Punisher (collected in Punisher MAX Volume 11: Girls in White Dresses, 120 pages, March 2009, ISBN 0-7851-2520-5):
  - Punisher Annual #1: "The Hunted" (with Mike Benson, one-shot, Marvel Comics, November 2007)
  - Punisher #61-65: "Girls in White Dresses" (pencils, with writer Gregg Hurwitz, Marvel MAX, October 2008 - February 2009)
- Moon Knight: "Moon Knight: Silent Knight" (with Peter Milligan, one-shot, Marvel Comics, November 2008)
- Deadpool Pulp (with Mike Benson/Adam Glass, 4-issue limited series, Marvel Comics, 2010, forthcoming)
- Marvel Universe vs. Wolverine (with Jonathan Maberry, 4-issue limited series, Marvel Comics, June–August 2011, tpb, 112 pages, hardcover, November 2011, ISBN 0-7851-5692-5, softcover, May 2012, ISBN 0-7851-5653-4)
