= Marlene Alraune =

Publication information
- Publisher: Marvel Comics
- First appearance: Marvel Spotlight #28 (June 1976)
- Created by: Doug Moench; Don Perlin

In-story information
- Full name: Marlene Alraune
- Species: Human
- Team affiliations: SpectorCorp
- Partnerships: Marc Spector / Moon Knight
- Abilities: Skilled gymnast and markswoman; Expert at hand-to-hand combat

Marlene Alraune is a character appearing in American comic books published by Marvel Comics. Created by writer Doug Moench and artist Don Perlin, the character first appeared in Marvel Spotlight #28 (June 1976). She is the daughter of archaeologist Dr. Peter Alraune. During an expedition to uncover the lost tomb of Khonshu, her father was killed by mercenaries attempting to loot the site, and she met Marc Spector after he was mortally wounded and left for dead near a statue of Khonshu.

Alraune was the first to encounter Spector after his transformation into the Fist of Khonshu. Following her father's death, she traveled with Spector to the United States and became his long-term romantic partner while he operated as Moon Knight. She assisted him in his vigilante activities, including working undercover to help apprehend criminals.

== Publication history ==
Marlene Alraune debuted in Marvel Spotlight #28 (June 1976), created by Doug Moench and Don Perlin. She later appeared in the 1980 Moon Knight series, the 2021 Moon Knight series, and the 2022 Moon Knight Annual one-shot.

== Fictional character biography ==
Marlene is the daughter of archaeologist Peter Alraune Sr. and the brother of Peter Alraune Jr. She is first seen in Sudan with her father when he is killed by the mercenary Raoul Bushman. Another mercenary named Marc Spector saves Marlene's life, but Bushman ends up leaving Spector to die in the desert. Peter Alraune's workers bring Spector's inert body to the tomb of Pharaoh Seti III. Spector miraculously revives and he and Marlene return to the United States where he became the crimefighter Moon Knight. Marlene began to fall in love with Spector, who also used the alias of Steven Grant and Jake Lockley.

When Moon Knight is called back to Sudan due to a vision of Khonshu, Marlene stated that she would leave Marc if he left. As a result, Marlene moves out of their Long Island apartment.

Enrolling in a university to study work, Marlene moves in with her husband Eric Fontaine. She graduates from the university and becomes a researcher at Seaview Research Hospital. Marlene and Eric later separate, with Marlene returning to Marc Spector's side. After a while, both of them went their separate ways as Marc Spector's lifestyle was starting to endanger Marlene. Some time later, Moon Knight's Jake Lockley persona has a child named Diatrice with Marlene. Moon Knight's other personalities are unaware of this until Bushman and Sun King attack Marlene's house, where the truth is revealed to them.

== Powers and abilities ==
Marlene has the strength and agility of a normal woman: she is a skilled markswoman, gymnast, and hand-to-hand combatant and a resourceful crimefighter. On certain occasions, Marlene sometimes carried a .44 magnum pistol.

== Other versions ==
=== Infinity Wars ===
During the "Infinity Wars" storyline when the universe was folded in half, Moon Knight and Spider-Man were fused together, alongside their supporting casts. Marlene is fused with Mary Jane Watson, forming Marley Jane Watson. She is the assistant of Peter Parker (Arachknight), and aids him in his heroics.

=== What If? ===
What If...? Dark: Moon Knight #1 explores in alternate scenario of Marc Spector: Moon Knight #3 in which Marc dies while rescuing Marlene from Bushman. As she lashes out at Khonshu for failing to save him, Ra reaches out to her and offers her the chance to become his avatar to bring light to the darkness. She accepts and becomes a new vigilante called the Luminary, gaining the ability to generate light and heat while donning a costume similar to Moon Knight.

She used her new powers initially to fight crime in New York before eventually returning to Cambodia to face Bushman head on. Despite being seriously wounded, she manages to kill him and avenge her father and Marc. While recovering in the hospital, Marlene's spirit reunites with Marc in the afterlife, allowing Ra to take full control of her body.

== In other media ==
In the Marvel Cinematic Universe (MCU) miniseries Moon Knight, the character Layla El-Faouly was inspired by Marlene Alraune. Both characters are the daughters of archaeologists whose fathers are killed by Raoul Bushman, an event that influences Marc Spector's transformation into Moon Knight. El-Faouly's role as Spector's wife parallels Alraune's relationship with him in the comics; however, unlike Alraune, El-Faouly takes on the superhero identity of Scarlet Scarab. Director Mohamed Diab initially suggested that the character was originally conceived as a white woman. However, series creator and executive producer Jeremy Slater later clarified that Alraune was never part of the series, with El-Faouly being conceptualized during the writers' room's first week.
