= Moon Knight =

Marvel Comics fictional character

- Moon Knight taken from a splash page of Moon Knight #1 (November 1980). Art by Bill Sienkiewicz.

Publication information
- Publisher: Marvel Comics
- First appearance: Werewolf by Night #32 (August 1975)
- Created by: Doug Moench; Don Perlin

In-story information
- Alter ego: Marc Spector; Steven Grant; Jake Lockley
- Species: Human
- Team affiliations: Avengers; Secret Avengers; West Coast Avengers; Defenders; Midnight Sons; Marvel Knights; Heroes for Hire; United States Marine Corps Force Reconnaissance
- Notable aliases: Lunar Legionnaire; Fist of Khonshu; Moon Man; Mr. Knight
- Abilities: Moon empowerment enhances abilities at night; Utilizes high-tech equipment; Expert detective; Mystical visions; Weapon expert; Martial artist
Moon Knight
Publication information
- Schedule: Monthly
- Format: Ongoing series
- Genre: Superhero
- Publication date: November 1980 – present
- No. of issues: List: vol. 1: 38; vol. 2: 6; Marc Spector: 60; vol. 3: 4; vol. 4: 4; vol. 5: 30; Vengeance: 10; vol. 6: 12; vol. 7: 17; vol. 8: 14; Legacy: 13; vol. 9: 30; Vengeance vol. 2: 9; Fist of Khonshu: 15; Marc Spector vol. 2
Creative team
- Written by: List: (vol. 1) Doug Moench (1–15, 17–26, 28–33), Jack C. Harris (16), Alan Zelenetz (18, 21–22, 27, 32, 36–38), Tony Isabella (34–35) (vol. 2) Alan Zelenetz (1–4), Jo Duffy & Chris Warner (#5), Christopher Priest (#6) (Marc Spector) Chuck Dixon (1–24, 34), J. M. DeMatteis (26–32), Terry Kavanagh (35–60) (vol. 3), (vol. 4) Doug Moench (vol. 5) Charlie Huston (1-13), Mike Benson (14-30) (vol. 6) Brian Michael Bendis (vol. 7) Warren Ellis (1–6), Brian Wood (7-12), Cullen Bunn (13-17) (vol. 8) Jeff Lemire (Legacy) Max Bemis (vol. 9) Jed MacKay
- Penciller: List: (vol. 1) Bill Sienkiewicz, Kevin Nowlan, Bo Hampton (vol. 2) Chris Warner (Marc Spector) Sal Velluto, Ron Garney, Gary Kwapisz, James Fry, Stephen Platt (vol. 3),(vol. 4) Tommy Lee Edwards (vol. 3) Mark Texeira (vol. 4) (vol. 5) David Finch, Mark Texeira, Mico Suayan, Javier Saltares, Jefte Palo (vol. 6) Alex Maleev (vol. 7) Declan Shalvey, Greg Smallwood, Ron Ackins (vol. 8) Greg Smallwood (Legacy) Jacen Burrows, Ty Templeton, Paul Davidson (vol. 9) Alessandro Cappuccio, Federico Sabbatini
Collected editions
- Moon Knight Omnibus, Volume 1: ISBN 978-1-302-92686-1
- Moon Knight Omnibus, Volume 2: ISBN 978-1-302-93453-8
- Moon Knight: Marc Spector Omnibus, Volume 1: ISBN 978-1-302-95037-8
- Moon Knight: Marc Spector Omnibus, Volume 2: ISBN 978-1-302-95689-9
- Moon Knight Complete Collection by Huston, Benson & Hurwitz Omnibus: ISBN 978-1-302-93456-9

Moon Knight is a superhero appearing in American comic books published by Marvel Comics. Created by writer Doug Moench and artist Don Perlin, the character first appeared in Werewolf by Night #32 (August 1975) as a mercenary antagonist before being recast as a superhero in subsequent appearances. Moon Knight is typically portrayed as a street-level vigilante with minimal superhuman abilities, relying instead on his athletic conditioning, expert hand-to-hand combat training, and detective skills to fight crime.

The Jewish American son of a rabbi, Marc Spector served as a Force Recon Marine before becoming a mercenary alongside his friend Jean-Paul "Frenchie" DuChamp. The mercenary Raoul Bushman kills Spector, but the Egyptian moon god Khonshu resurrects him as an avatar. Returning to the United States, Spector becomes the crimefighter Moon Knight, aided by Frenchie and archaeologist Marlene Alraune, who becomes his lover. In addition to his costumed identity, he maintains three other personas: billionaire businessman Steven Grant and taxicab driver Jake Lockley, both used to gather information. Multiple storylines depict Moon Knight as having dissociative identity disorder, with the Grant and Lockley alters traced back to his childhood, though other accounts attribute his multiple personalities to physical alterations made to his mind by Khonshu rather than a clinical condition.

Moon Knight received his first ongoing series in 1980, with Moench and artist Bill Sienkiewicz as the main creative team. The character has since headlined nine ongoing series and numerous limited series spanning over four decades, with notable runs by writers including Charlie Huston, Warren Ellis, Jeff Lemire, and Jed MacKay. He has also been a recurring member of teams including the West Coast Avengers and the Secret Avengers.

The character has made appearances in various media outside of comics, including animated series and video games. Oscar Isaac portrays the character in the Marvel Cinematic Universe series Moon Knight (2022). Moon Knight has long been regarded as a cult favorite among superhero comics readers, and commentators have frequently compared him to Batman given shared traits such as wealth, detective skills, and the use of multiple identities, though writers and critics have consistently argued that his psychological complexity, Egyptian mythology, and mercenary background distinguish him as a substantially different character.

== Development ==
In an interview, Doug Moench recalled the character's genesis:

I think somebody in the [Marvel Comics] office mentioned, 'Well, you know, so-and-so came up with the Committee, and maybe you should bring the Committee back.' [...] And then I found out who the Committee were and I said, 'Well, they're really boring, you know. I don't want to use them.' And then I thought, 'Well, wait a minute. How about if the Committee hires a mercenary to kill the Werewolf?' [...] So, I set out, 'Well, who would be best to kill the Werewolf?' Well, someone who uses silver weapons 'cause silver hurts the Werewolf, you know. And tied to the night, because [the] Werewolf only comes out at night, and what's at night? The moon. Okay, I'll base this character on the moon because the moon makes the Werewolf change, and this is going to be the opposite of a werewolf.

Don Perlin also commented on the creation of the character, "We were told we needed a costumed character in the book. So Doug and I created Moon Knight. I wanted the costume to be just black and white. Since he'd be on a color page, that would make him a little bit different. He had a silver baton he could use when he battled werewolves. See, he was hired to track down to kill the Werewolf."

== Publication history ==
The character debuted in Werewolf by Night #32 (August 1975), written by Doug Moench with art by Don Perlin and Al Milgrom, as a mercenary hired by the Committee to capture the title character. The creative team gave Moon Knight moon-related symbols and silver weapons (a metal poisonous to a werewolf) to mark him as a suitable antagonist for the werewolf hero. The two-part story continues into #33, when Moon Knight realizes Russell is a victim rather than a monster and decides to help him. A demonic vision of Moon Knight then appeared in Werewolf by Night #37 (March 1976).

Editors Marv Wolfman and Len Wein liked the character and decided to give him a solo story in Marvel Spotlight #28–29 (June/August 1976), again written by Doug Moench with art by Don Perlin. The story, along with Spectacular Spider-Man #22–23 (September/October 1978) written by Bill Mantlo, recast Moon Knight as a more heroic character. His association with the evil Committee during his first appearance was retconned to be an undercover mission he undertook to learn more about the villains. Moon Knight acted as a hero again in Marvel Two-in-One #52, written by Steven Grant with art by Jim Craig. In The Defenders #47–51, Moon Knight briefly joined the Defenders during their war against the Zodiac Cartel.

Moon Knight appeared in recurring backup stories in Hulk! Magazine #11–15, #17–18, and #20, as well as a black and white story in the magazine publication Marvel Preview #21, all written by Doug Moench. Artist Bill Sienkiewicz drew Moon Knight in Hulk! Magazine issues #13–15, 17–18, and #20, creating a new look for the character heavily influenced by the art of Neal Adams, who at that time was most popular for his work on Batman and Green Lantern/Green Arrow for DC Comics. This, along with Moon Knight's methods and the atmosphere of his stories, cemented a perception among some readers that he was Marvel's version of Batman. The Hulk backups and Marvel Preview issue provided Moon Knight with a partial origin story and introduced his brother, recurring villain Randall Spector (who would later become Shadow Knight).

=== Volume 1 ===
Moon Knight received his first ongoing series in 1980, with Doug Moench and Bill Sienkiewicz as its main creative team. The character received an expanded origin story in issue #1, including Spector's "resurrection" in the tomb of Khonshu, suggested by editor Denny O'Neil), which also introduced several supporting characters as well as recurring enemy Bushman. Though many characters doubted the moon god Khonshu was real and believed Marc Spector only experienced a hallucination while near death, it was never explained why others, such as Spector's lover Marlene, concluded this when there was no other explanation for Marc's spontaneous recovery from his wounds and a death-like state.

After early sales were good, Marvel made the Moon Knight series a flagship title available in comic shops starting with issue #15. The companion mini-series Moon Knight: Special Edition reprinted the Hulk and Marvel Preview Moon Knight stories in color and standard comic format, adapted from their original magazine format. Sienkiewicz stopped penciling the series after issue #30, though he continued to contribute covers until the series ended with issue #38.

=== Volume 2 ===
In 1985, Marvel retooled the character with a new 6-issue mini-series Moon Knight by Alan Zelenetz and Chris Warner. The mini-series was titled "Fist of Khonshu". Only the first 4 issues were written by Zelenetz, the final two issues were each written by a different author. Along with giving Moon Knight new Egyptian-themed weaponry, this mini-series reveals that Marc Spector's strength now increases in accordance to the phases of the moon.

=== Marvel Fanfare and West Coast Avengers ===
Following the "Fist of Khonshu" mini-series, Moon Knight appeared in Marvel Fanfare for two issues (#30 and #38) and became a regular cast member in West Coast Avengers (#21–41 and Annuals #2–3), written by Steve Englehart. When John Byrne became the series writer, Moon Knight was written out of the West Coast Avengers team.

=== Marc Spector: Moon Knight ===
After a guest spot in Punisher Annual #2 (part of the "Atlantis Attacks" storyline), the character was given a new ongoing title in 1989, Marc Spector: Moon Knight, originally under the direction of writer Chuck Dixon. Two one-shots, Marc Spector: Moon Knight – Special Edition #1 and Moon Knight: Divided We Fall, were published during the run of the title. Dixon then left the series after issue #24, leaving several storylines unresolved such as the fate of Moon Knight's errant sidekick, the second Midnight, who was seemingly killed by the terrorist organization known as the Secret Empire. Midnight II's fate and plotline were later resolved in the pages of Amazing Spider-Man #353–358, written by Al Milgrom.

Marc Spector: Moon Knight ended with #60 (March 1994). Marc Spector seemingly dies in the issue, sacrificing himself while battling a villain called Seth the Immortal. His body is recovered and then buried by his allies. The final storyline was written by Terry Kavanagh and with art by Stephen Platt, who was then hired by Image Comics based on the strength of his work during several of the series' final issues.

=== Volume 3 ===
In 1998, the 4-issue mini-series Moon Knight vol. 3 was published under writer Doug Moench, artist Tommy Edwards, and inker Robert Campanella. The four part story "Resurrection Wars" shows Marc Spector resurrected again by Khonshu, materializing alive and well in his home while experiencing a vision of himself rising from the grave as Khonshu summons him. Witnessing Marc's sudden manifestation in his home, and noting that the Statue of Khonshu explodes only to then repair itself, Marlene finally believes Khonshu is real and not a delusion. Despite this, the story mentions the possibility that Marc was not dead but somehow and inexplicably was put into a "death-like" state for months as a result of his previous injuries.

=== Volume 4 ===
In 1999, Moench and artist Mark Texeira produced Moon Knight vol. 4. This four-part mini-series was nominated for the Comics Buyer's Guide Fan Award for Favorite Limited Series. The title of the story was mistakenly given as "High Strangers" on each issue cover, while the correct title "High Strangeness" appeared on the interior title page of each issue.

=== Volume 5 ===
A new ongoing series, Moon Knight vol. 5, was launched in April 2006, written by Charlie Huston with art by David Finch. The series revises Marc Spector's history by saying he fought in the Gulf War. Starting with issue #14 of this series, Mike Benson took over writing duties while Huston acted as a story/plot adviser according to Benson. The 2006 series ended with #30 (July 2009), and only one Annual issue for the series was printed in 2008. Peter Milligan wrote a 2008 seasonal one-shot titled Moon Knight: Silent Knight with artist Laurence Campbell.

=== Vengeance of the Moon Knight ===
In September 2009, a new series titled Vengeance of the Moon Knight began by writer Gregg Hurwitz and artist Jerome Opena. Vengeance of the Moon Knight ended with issue #10. Moon Knight became a regular team cast member in Secret Avengers #1–21. In Secret Avengers, writer Warren Ellis introduced the idea that Moon Knight sometimes operates without a costume and instead wearing a simple white suit and full white mask. Moon Knight also appeared in the Shadowland crossover and in the 2010 relaunch of Heroes for Hire.

=== Volume 6 ===
In 2011, the series Moon Knight vol. 6 was launched by Brian Michael Bendis and Alex Maleev. The series depicted Moon Knight once again experiencing four alters, though now three of his alters were imitations of Spider-Man, Captain America, and Wolverine. Due to poor sales, the series was canceled after 12 issues.

=== Volume 7 ===
In March 2014, the Marvel NOW! initiative launched Moon Knight vol. 7. The series involved rotating creative teams that included Warren Ellis and Declan Shalvey for issues #1–6, Brian Wood and Greg Smallwood for issues #7–12, and Cullen Bunn and Ron Ackins for issues #13–17. The series brings back the white suit and tie outfit first seen in Secret Avengers, and now has Moon Knight adopt this outfit when working as a police consultant, answering to "Mr. Knight." With issue #1 of this series, writer Warren Ellis confirmed that Khonshu is a real god or extraterrestrial entity and that Marc Spector indeed died and was resurrected years ago in the tomb in Egypt.

Issue #1 of this series depicted a psychologist confirming that stress and the use of multiple cover identities cannot cause someone to suffer from DID if they did not already suffer from the condition and that Marc's symptoms do not correspond to actual DID. Marc Spector's different alters are now said to be due to "brain damage," alterations to his brain made by the alien entity Khonshu that connect their minds. These alterations also cause Moon Knight to sometimes shift his personality to match one of the moon god's four distinct roles and facets. These four roles are described as: "pathfinder", "embracer", "defender", and "watcher of overnight travelers." These four roles can manifest in different ways, either with original names or borrowing names and personality traits of people Marc has observed (such as when he briefly acted as if he were Spider-Man, Wolverine, and Captain America).

=== Volume 8 ===
In April 2016, the "All-New, All-Different Marvel" initiative included the new series Moon Knight vol. 8. Written by Jeff Lemire and artist Greg Smallwood (returning from his run with Brian Wood), the series began having rotating artists with issue #6. After fourteen issues, the series numbering changed to acknowledge it was a continuation of the Moon Knight volumes published before, so issue #15 was instead given the designation #188. This renumbering was done as part of the company-wide Marvel Legacy initiative. The series ended with issue #200, which involved contributions from several previously established Moon Knight artists. In 2019, Cullen Bunn wrote and Ibrahim Mustafa and Matt Horak drew Moon Knight Annual #1.

Lemire's stories revised Marc's history to show he had first exhibited symptoms of DID and assumed the identity of his alter Steven Grant while still a young boy. The series also showed Khonshu creating a psychic connection between himself and Marc Spector when the latter was still a boy, indicating the moon god may still be responsible for Marc's DID-like condition. In the series, Khonshu claims he influenced Marc at times over the years, waiting until years later to fully reveal himself. Khonshu then reveals he intends to use Marc as a host body, fully dominating his personality, but Marc refuses. The series has Marc acknowledge that he had exhibited DID symptoms long before assuming the mask of Moon Knight and that his previous claim that his alters were nothing more than cover identities was simply denial of his condition.

In Avengers vol. 8 #33–38 (Marvel Comics, 2020), Khonshu attempts to dominate Earth to save it, compelling Moon Knight to help him. A battle with the Avengers results in Khonshu being imprisoned by the Asgardians. The story was produced by Jason Aaron, Javier Garron, and Jason Keith.

=== Volume 9 ===
In 2021, the series Moon Knight vol. 9 launched under writer Jed MacKay, and artists Alessandro Cappuccio and Rachelle Rosenberg. The new series has Marc Spector not only acting as the crimefighter Moon Knight but also (despite his Jewish background) adopting the role of high priest of "the Midnight Mission," a congregation dedicated to Khonshu. In discussing his connection to Khonshu, Marc Spector now describes his four aspects as "the traveler," "the pathfinder," "the embracer," and "the defender of those who travel at night." Once again, Marc Spector is depicted as being in regular therapy with a psychologist to help manage his psychological issues. The series also offers that Marc Spector may be immortal, as he has now been literally resurrected on multiple occasions and could be resurrected again in the future. The volume concluded with issue 30 in December 2023 with the storyline "The Last Days of Moon Knight".

=== Moon Knight: Black, White, and Blood ===
In April 2022 an anthology series Moon Knight: Black, White, and Blood was released alongside the Disney+ series with various stories by creative teams Jonathan Hickman and Chris Bachalo; Marc Guggenheim and artist Jorge Fornes; and writer Murewa Ayodele and Dotun Akanda.

=== Vengeance of the Moon Knight vol. 2 ===
In September 2023, it was announced that MacKay and Cappuccio would be continuing their Moon Knight saga with Vengeance of the Moon Knight, with a new Moon Knight emerging following the death of Marc Spector. The series debuted in January 2024 and finished after 9 issues.

=== Moon Knight: Fist of Khonshu (2024) ===
Writer Jed Mackay and Penciller Alessandro Cappuccio rebooted the series on October 16, 2024 and reused the 1985 Fist of Khonshu title. The series begins after Marc Spector's resurrection and the return of the Egyptian moon god Khonshu, restoring Moon Knight as his chosen champion. This series went on until Dec 2025 with 15 issues.

=== Phases of the Moon Knight ===
In August 2024, Marvel released a 4-issue limited series called Phases of the Moon Knight, which is an anthology series that follows previous Fists of Khonshu, including during the Crusades and other historical periods. Writers and authors change each issue, like with Black, White, and Blood. Featured authors have included Jed MacKay, Yuji Kaku, and Fabian Nicieza.

=== Marc Spector: Moon Knight Vol 2 (2024) ===
In Feb 2026 Marvel started a new Moon Knight series with Jed Mackay and Devmalya Pramanik. Moon Knight joins the Midnight Sons and the West Coast Avengers. The series is on 12 issues as of January 2027.

== Characterization ==
=== Fictional character biography ===
Born in Chicago, Marc Spector is the Jewish-American son of a rabbi who survived Nazi persecution. From childhood, Spector exhibits signs of dissociative identity disorder, developing alters named Steven Grant and Jake Lockley, which leads his parents to commit him to a psychiatric hospital. After escaping, he joins the U.S. Marine Corps, serves in Force Recon, and is eventually discharged when his mental health history is discovered. He becomes a mercenary alongside French pilot Jean-Paul DuChamp,, and later joins the ruthless mercenary Raoul Bushman on a contract in Sudan. When Bushman massacres civilians and kills an archaeologist named Dr. Peter Alraune, Spector intervenes to protect Alraune's daughter Marlene. Defeated by Bushman and left to die in the desert, Spector collapses near a statue of the Egyptian moon god Khonshu and is seemingly resurrected. He interprets this as a divine calling, adopts a white-and-silver costume, and returns to America as the crimefighter Moon Knight, with Frenchie and Marlene as allies. To fund his activities he leverages his Steven Grant identity to build a business fortune, while his Jake Lockley identity gathers street-level intelligence.

Moon Knight battles a range of criminals and supervillains, frequently teaming up with heroes such as Spider-Man and Daredevil. He briefly joins the West Coast Avengers at Khonshu's behest, but resigns when he realizes the moon god has been manipulating him. During his time with the Marc Spector: Moon Knight series, he takes on a reluctant sidekick named Midnight, whose transformation into a cyborg weapon by the terrorist Secret Empire haunts Spector. He also battles his own brother Randall, who becomes the superpowered villain Shadow Knight before being killed by Punisher. Spector dies and is resurrected by Khonshu on multiple occasions throughout his career; it is left ambiguous whether this makes him effectively immortal.

During the Civil War era, Moon Knight reluctantly registers under the Superhero Registration Act before having his status revoked after pushing Black Spectre off a rooftop. He operates in exile before returning to New York under a reformed, non-lethal code of conduct. He later joins the covert team Secret Avengers and introduces his "Mr. Knight" persona. A psychologist eventually determines that his multiple personalities are not clinical DID but the result of his brain being physically altered by Khonshu to mirror the god's own multi-faceted nature. During the "Age of Khonshu" storyline, Khonshu uses Moon Knight to seize power over Earth, temporarily granting him the abilities of Iron Fist, Ghost Rider, Thor, and Doctor Strange, before the Avengers and Asgardians imprison the god.

In his most recent ongoing series, Spector establishes the Midnight Mission, a congregation devoted to Khonshu's teachings, serving simultaneously as its high priest and as Moon Knight. He defeats a rival avatar called Hunter's Moon and is ultimately killed battling the villain Black Spectre. Shroud briefly takes up the Moon Knight mantle before Spector is resurrected once again by Khonshu.

=== Powers and abilities ===
==== Skills and training ====
Moon Knight is an Olympic-level athlete and a skilled acrobat who excels at combat strategy. Spector is a superb driver and can pilot a helicopter. Thanks to his life experience and training as a U.S. Marine, boxer, and mercenary, Marc Spector became an expert at hand-to-hand combat, marksmanship, boxing, kung fu, eskrima, judo, karate, ninjutsu, savate, and Muay Thai. Moon Knight's fighting style combines elements of various combat techniques and relies heavily on adaptability, using the environment to his advantage, intimidating his opponents, and accepting a certain level of pain and injury. The villain and mercenary Taskmaster, who can perfectly replicate fighting styles, has stated he prefers not to copy Moon Knight since the hero would sometimes rather take a punch than block or dodge it. Moon Knight is shown to possess a very high tolerance for pain and torture. Moon Knight is also an expert detective. Investigation is an important part of his stories, where he is often aided by his other personalities. Jake Lockley gathers information on the street level, Steven Grant among the rich and influential figures, and Mr. Knight works with the NYPD investigating police cases.

==== Technology and equipment ====
As Moon Knight, Spector typically wears lightweight, kevlar body armor and a specially constructed, silver glider-cape that can catch winds and thermal updrafts. He typically wears metal bracers on his wrists and calves. Later costumes have added metal plates providing extra protection to his chest and shoulders. Moon Knight employs a variety of weapons over the course of his career, many of which involve or are made of silver. His most commonly used weapons are his silver crescent-darts (some of which are blunt, some of which are blades) and an adamantium-reinforced truncheon that can fire a grappling hook and extend into a bō staff. At times, he has also used nunchaku and a compound bow. For a brief time, Moon Knight wore gauntlets with spiked knuckles.

At one point, Moon Knight accepted golden and ivory Egyptian-themed weapons created by followers of Khonshu. These included bolas, golden scarab-shaped darts, an ivory boomerang, throwing irons, an axe-shaped lasso-grapple, and a golden ankh-shaped blunt weapon which glowed in the presence of danger. These items were later replaced with duplicate weapons designed by Hawkeye.

In a period while suffering from health issues, Moon Knight adopts thin, lightweight adamantium armor for greater protection. During this time, he acquires an adamantium staff, a truncheon capable of firing a cable line, and gauntlets that fire crescent darts.

During the events of "Dark Reign," the Tinkerer makes Moon Knight carbonadium armor with joint-locking functions, reinforcing his strength. Moon Knight uses this feature to support a building from collapsing, despite a lack of superhuman strength. Additionally, the armor could instantly assemble around his body after being triggered by remote control.

For transportation, Moon Knight employs a variety of sophisticated aircraft such as the Mooncopter and the Angelwing, a mini-jet featuring VTOL (vertical take-off and landing) and 20mm cannons. At times, Moon Knight has also used a white, customized motorcycle, a remote-controlled white limousine, and a remote-controlled crescent-shaped drone/glider capable of carrying a single person.

During the onset of the "Age of Khonshu" event, Marc was provided by the cult who worships his divinity with magical Ankhs that enabled him to drain away and utilize the primordial powers bestowed upon Earth's Mightiest through their colorful prehistoric ancestry. Taking the powers of Iron Fist from Daniel Rand, the vengeance spirit Zarathos from Ghost Rider alongside his hellcharger, and the mystical abilities pertaining to the Sorcerer Supreme Doctor Strange. He acquired these with the intent of assimilating those of the Star Brand, the Phoenix Force and the Odin-Force-imbued Mjolnir belonging to All-Father Thor as well.

==== Superpowers ====
On more than one occasion, Marc Spector has died and then been resurrected by the other-dimensional entity Khonshu. It is not known if Khonshu will continually do this, making Marc Spector effectively immortal, or if he will only do this until he chooses a new champion.

Due to his brain being altered by Khonshu, Marc Spector is more resistant to telepathic and psychic attack than the average person. He sometimes experiences visions of prophecy or enhanced insight. Some initially believed these visions were delusions or inspired simply by Spector inadvertently performing self-hypnosis, but it is now known that Khonshu is real and grants him these visions. It has been implied in several stories that Marc's connection to Khonshu and this supernatural insight increases when he wears his Moon Knight costume, as it represents "vestments" of the moon god. The villain-for-hire Profile has a superhuman analysis ability that does not function properly on beings with supernatural/magic-based abilities, and remarked that he found it painful to look at Marc Spector whenever the hero donned his Moon Knight costume. Profile was not sure if this was due to Spector's mental illness or if wearing the costume helped Moon Knight tap directly into the moon god's power.

During the time that Moon Knight adopted golden and ivory weapons (symbolizing his status as the Fist of Khonshu), his strength, endurance, and reflexes would increase depending on the phases of the moon, operating on a superhuman level during a full moon night. Even during a new moon, he can lift several hundred pounds. Although some believed this superhuman strength had nothing to do with Khonshu and was the result of self-hypnosis, it is now known that Khonshu is real and is directly connected to Marc Spector. Khonshu later removed this power from Moon Knight as punishment for disobedience and has never returned it.

After the "Serpent War", Marc's patron deity Khonshu opted to further empower his champion on Earth with all new abilities in preparation for the rise of Mephistopheles. By giving his herald the lion share of the moon supremacy's power; Marc would be endowed with all the abilities of his namesake as the Fist of Khonshu along with a couple others outside of the criteria. He is granted the transformational capability to change to and from his costumed identity at will, on top of powers over lunar effects such as creating astral rock formations consisting of planetary orbital satellites, raising and commanding the dead; mummies loyal to his divinity, lunar empowerment under the supermoon created by Khonshu's will and the ability to survive unaided in the cold recesses of space without life support. These powers gave Moon Knight enough raw might to battle and defeat the world's most powerful heroes, the Avengers.

For a brief time, Moon Knight became a host avatar for the Phoenix Force, a cosmic force that governs life, death and rebirth throughout the universe and potentially the multiverse. Possessing all the typical skills and abilities of an Avatar to the cosmic entity regarding cosmic pyrokinesis, telekinesis, flight, etc.

== Supporting characters ==
=== Allies ===
Throughout his different stories, certain supporting characters frequently help Marc Spector in his activities as Moon Knight. Marlene Alraune is an archaeologist whose father is murdered by Raoul Bushman, the same encounter through which she first meets Marc Spector. She becomes a long-term ally, advisor, and romantic partner to Spector, and later the mother of his daughter, Diatrice Alraune. Despite initially doubting the existence of Khonshu, she comes to accept his reality over time, though she consistently encourages Spector to abandon violence. The two separate on multiple occasions throughout the series. Greer Grant Nelson, known as Tigra, is a superhero and member of the Avengers who enters into a romantic relationship with Spector during his time in Los Angeles. Maya Lopez, known as Echo, is a deaf superhero and skilled martial artist who becomes romantically involved with Spector during Brian Michael Bendis's run on the character.

Jean-Paul DuChamp, known as Frenchie, is Moon Knight's helicopter pilot and closest friend, having met Spector after he left the Marines. Though a mercenary by trade, DuChamp is portrayed as principled and becomes a consistent supporter of Spector's activities as Moon Knight. His husband, Rob Silverman, also appears as a supporting character. Bertrand Crawley, a homeless former textbook salesman, and Gena Landers, a diner manager, both serve as street-level informants, primarily in Spector's Jake Lockley identity. Gena's son Ray Landers is an experienced pilot and mechanic who occasionally pilots the Mooncopter in Frenchie's absence.

The Cult of Khonshu is a secretive religious order dedicated to the moon god, whose members periodically provide Spector with information and specialized weaponry. Rogue factions within the cult have at various points acted against Spector, believing him unworthy of the mantle. Hunter's Moon, also known as Dr. Baldr, is another avatar of Khonshu who operates alongside Moon Knight. Khonshu himself functions as an ally in earlier stories but becomes increasingly antagonistic in later narratives. Reese Williams, a vampire assisted by Moon Knight, later serves as his assistant at the Midnight Mission and aids him in criminal investigations.

=== Rogues gallery ===
Moon Knight's rogues gallery is closely tied to his origins as a mercenary and his role as the avatar of the Egyptian moon god Khonshu. His archenemy is Raoul Bushman, the mercenary who left Marc Spector for dead in Egypt, an act that directly led to Spector becoming Moon Knight. Several other early villains, including Zaran and Killer Shrike, are mercenaries or hired assassins. The Committee, a criminal organization that originally employed Spector, becomes a recurring antagonist after he turns against them.

Several of Moon Knight's villains are presented as counterparts to him. Carson Knowles, the Black Spectre, adopts a costumed identity modeled on Moon Knight's own. Shadow Knight is Marc Spector's younger brother Randall, who becomes a superpowered antagonist. Jeff Wilde served as Moon Knight's sidekick under the name Midnight before being killed and resurrected as a cyborg by the Secret Empire, subsequently returning as a villain. The Sun King claims to be the avatar of Ra, positioning their conflict as one between rival Egyptian divine figures.

Egyptian mythology is a recurring element of Moon Knight's rogues gallery. Villains such as the Living Pharaoh, Set, Ammut, Sobek, and Princess Nephthys are drawn from the Egyptian pantheon or mythology. The Knights of the Moon, a rogue faction of the Cult of Khonshu, are presented as opponents from within Moon Knight's own religious order. Profile, an information broker with the ability to instantly analyze anyone he observes, and Morpheus, a man transformed by sleep deprivation experiments, are among the villains whose abilities relate to psychology and perception, themes associated with Moon Knight's portrayal as a character with dissociative identity disorder.

=== Legacy characters ===
Several other individuals have operated as Moon Knight across different historical periods, each serving as an avatar of Khonshu. The earliest known instance is a Homo erectus from 1,000,000 BC, who joined a prehistoric grouping of heroes analogous to the Avengers and encountered the present-day Avengers when they traveled back in time. Other ancient avatars include a Moon Knight active during Ancient Mesopotamia, one active in 2620 BC, a female avatar active in 2500 BC, and a Roman gladiator who held the mantle in 300 BC. A Moon Knight was also active during the Viking Age and another during the Middle Ages. More recent historical avatars include a pirate from 1710, a soldier who fought in the American Revolutionary War in 1776, a Victorian-era figure from 1896, a gunfighter who operated during the Old West period, a gangster from the 1920s, and an avatar who fought against Hydra during World War II in the 1940s. A female Moon Knight was active in 1977 and worked alongside Blade.

=== Alternate versions ===
Alternate versions of Moon Knight exist across Marvel's multiverse. In the Ultimate Universe (Earth-1610), Moon Knight is a Navy SEAL whose abilities derive from a failed attempt to recreate the Super-Soldier Serum. After leaving the military, this version temporarily operates under the name Paladin and works for the corporation Roxxon. In the Universe X continuity (Earth-9997), Moon Knight is rendered virtually immortal through the use of the Re-Animator stone, only to die after Mar-Vell takes the stone. After his death, Moon Knight uses a shard of the Cosmic Cube to construct a personalized afterlife. In the Ultimate Universe (Earth-6160), the Moon Knights are an army serving Khonshu and Ra. In the Old Man Logan continuity (Earth-807128), an alternate version of Moon Knight appears in the dystopian future setting of that storyline. On Earth-818, the role of Moon Knight is filled by Mariama Spector, a member of Tony Stark's resistance against the Black Skull.

Several alternate versions appear in limited series and crossover events. In Extraordinary X-Men, during the Apocalypse Wars storyline, a female version of Moon Knight serves as one of the Horsemen of Apocalypse before being killed by Nightcrawler. In Deadpool Kills the Marvel Universe Again, an alternate Moon Knight investigates Deadpool's murder of several heroes, eventually discovering that Deadpool had been brainwashed before being killed by him. A zombified version of Moon Knight from Earth-2149 appears in Marvel Zombies. An ancient Egyptian incarnation of Moon Knight appears in S.H.I.E.L.D. #1. During The Infinity War crossover, Moon Shade, a clone of Moon Knight created by Adam Warlock, appears as an antagonist. In Infinity Wars, the Infinity Gems create a fused character combining Moon Knight and Spider-Man, Peter Spector / Arachknight.

During the Secret Wars storyline, several variants of Moon Knight appear as residents of Battleworld. In the region of K'un-L'un, Moon Knight leads a faction called the Faces of the Moon and is defeated by Shang-Chi in the Tournament of the Thirteen Chambers. In the region of Egyptia, Moon Knight is a werewolf and a member of an elite warrior group called the Moon Knights who serve Khonshu. In the region of Marville, Moon Knight is among the heroes competing for the attention of the twins Zach and Zoe.

Two alternate versions of Moon Knight exist within Marvel's 2099 continuity. One is an unidentified female version who appears in the one-shot 2099: Manifest Destiny, fighting crime in the lunar city of Attilan and persuading the 2099 version of Uatu the Watcher not to dispose of his clones of the Fantastic Four. The other is a character named Tabitha, who frees Strange 2099 from a demonic possession during the period in which the Anti-Powers Act is in effect. In the unified Earth-2099 reality, Tabitha is a member of the 2099 Avengers. Following the massacre of the team by the 2099 Masters of Evil, Tabitha respawns and forms a new team that defeats the Masters of Evil and imprisons them on the planet Wakanda.

== Cultural impact and reception ==
=== Critical response ===
Matt Attanasio of ComicsVerse referred to Moon Knight as the "excellent example of how anyone can suffer from a mental illness and manage to overcome such an illness," writing, "When you look at Moon Knight's story as a whole, it appears to be more and more of a story about perseverance, endurance, and coming to grips with who you are. That's an extremely universal story. That's something anyone can relate to, in one way or another. It's a call to believe in yourself, and to never give up. And, really, that's one of the most heroic tales you can get." Syfy called Moon Knight an "unusual fan favorite," saying, "For decades, some fans have affectionately called Moon Knight "Marvel's Batman." But that's not a strictly accurate way to describe the Fist of Khonshu, who's his own man. [...] While Spector's public cover as a millionaire is definitely Bruce Wayne-lite, what separates the Moon Knight from the Dark Knight is that he has three secret identities. Chase Magnett of ComicBook.com stated, "Ever since Moon Knight premiered in the pages of Werewolf by Night in 1975, he has been a cult favorite among superhero fans. It took until 1980 for the complicated hero and his many personalities to get their own ongoing series. It was a hit from the very start with two of the great talents of the era doing career-defining work (we'll get to who). That high bar has encouraged a lot of others to take similarly distinctive shots at the character ever since."

Comic Book Resources ranked Moon Knight 3rd in their "Marvel: 10 Best Street Level Heroes" list, 5th in their "10 Most Fashionable Marvel Heroes" list, and 9th in their "10 Most Powerful Members of The Secret Avengers" list. Matthew Perpetua Kibblesmith of BuzzFeed ranked Moon Knight 48th in their "84 Avengers Members Ranked From Worst To Best" list. Darren Franich Entertainment Weekly ranked Moon Knight 80th in their "Let's Rank Every Avenger Ever" list, calling him a "great character on his own." IGN ranked Moon Knight 49th in their "Top 50 Avengers" list, and 89th in their "Top 100 Comics Book Heroes" list. Wizard ranked Moon Knight 149th in their "top 200 Comic Book Characters" list.

==== Comparisons to Batman ====
Charlie Huston, writer of the 2006 re-launch of Moon Knight, attempted to answer the criticism that Moon Knight is an ersatz pastiche of Batman in an interview with Comixfan writer Remy Minnick. Minnick noted that the comparison is not baseless, as both Moon Knight and the Dark Knight are wealthy, "normal" humans who fight crime with detective skills, cover identities, skilled confidants, and are equipped with high-tech gadgetry, personalized air craft, and personalized throwing items. Likewise, Moon Knight briefly had a teenage would-be sidekick, with the Steven Grant identity becoming a billionaire (similar to Bruce Wayne), using the fortune to fund his career as Moon Knight. Huston accepted that the two characters have similarities, but went on to contrast them by noting particular differences in origin, motives, and personality. He said, "Bruce Wayne fights crime to avenge the murders of his parents," whereas Moon Knight "beats up whoever has it coming because he believes he is the avatar of the Egyptian god of vengeance and it helps him to feel better about all the people he killed when he was a mercenary." Thus, Batman is motivated by vengeance for a personal wrong against his parents, while Marc Spector is motivated by vengeance as a concept. Huston further notes that Bruce Wayne, Batman's alter ego, takes on other identities merely to aid in his investigations, while Moon Knight's three alters aid him as much in dealing with personal demons as fighting law-breakers, and had a further psychological toll by apparently causing dissociative identity disorder. Shawn S. Lealos of Comic Book Resources wrote, "Too many people call Moon Knight Marvel's version of Batman. There are some similarities, but Moon Knight is a much more complex character than Batman. Yes, both men are wealthy and use their money to front their crime-fighting adventures, but Batman is just a man fighting for good. Moon Knight has a split-personality and struggles to maintain his sanity. He gained the power of super-strength, durability, and stamina from the Moon God Khonshu. He doesn't mind killing, and most superheroes consider him to be completely insane. Sure, some fans compare him to Batman but only on the surface."

== In other media ==
=== Television ===
- According to author Doug Moench, a Moon Knight series was licensed by Toei for production in Japan, but was instead serialized as a manga from 1979–1980.
- Moon Knight appears in the Ultimate Spider-Man episode "The Moon Knight Before Christmas", voiced by Diedrich Bader. This version follows the Moon's advice.
- Moon Knight appears in Avengers Assemble, voiced by Gideon Emery. This version is the guardian of a pyramid that is temporarily transported to the Battleworld domain of Egyptia. Captain America offers him to join the Avengers, but Moon Knight chooses to stay behind and guard the evils contained in the pyramid.
- Moon Knight appears in the Spider-Man episode "Vengeance of Venom", voiced by Peter Giles. This version became a cynical survivalist after someone close to him was killed, leading to him abandoning the Moon Knight identity until May Parker inspires him to reassume it amidst the Klyntar's invasion.
- Moon Knight appears in Lego Marvel Avengers: Mission Demolition, voiced by Scott Porter.

=== Marvel Cinematic Universe ===
The character's dissociative identities of Marc Spector / Moon Knight, Steven Grant / Mr. Knight, and Jake Lockley appear in live-action media set in the Marvel Cinematic Universe (MCU), all portrayed by Oscar Isaac, with Carlos Sanchez portraying Grant and Spector as a child while David Rodriguez portrays Spector as a teenager. Spector is depicted as an ex-mercenary who assumes the role of Moon Knight under the Egyptian god, Khonshu to save his life, Grant is a British gift shop employee who assumes the alias of Mr. Knight under Khonshu, and Lockley is depicted as brutal and Khonshu's favored avatar. Isaac was considered for the role in October 2020 and cast by January 2021, before Marvel officially confirmed his casting that May.

- The character first appears in the Disney+ series Moon Knight, which premiered on March 30, 2022.
- In November 2019, Marvel Studios president Kevin Feige revealed that Moon Knight is set to appear in future MCU films following his introduction in his Disney+ series.
- An alternate universe variant of Marc Spector appears in the What If...? episode "What If... the Hulk Fought the Mech Avengers?".
- An alternate universe variant of Blade assumes the mantle of Moon Knight in the television series Marvel Zombies.

=== Video games ===
- Moon Knight appears as an unlockable playable character in Marvel Ultimate Alliance, voiced by Nolan North.
- Moon Knight appears as an assist character in Spider-Man: Web of Shadows, voiced by Robin Atkin Downes.
- Moon Knight appears in Hawkeye's ending for Ultimate Marvel vs. Capcom 3 as a member of the West Coast Avengers.
- Moon Knight appears in Marvel Pinball and the downloadable content for Pinball FX 2, voiced by Troy Baker.
- Moon Knight appears as an unlockable playable character in Marvel Avengers Alliance.
- Moon Knight appears as an unlockable playable character in Marvel Heroes, voiced again by Robin Atkin Downes.
- Moon Knight appears as an unlockable playable character in Lego Marvel Super Heroes.
- Moon Knight appears in Marvel Avengers Academy, voiced by Alan Adelberg.
- Moon Knight appears in Lego Marvel's Avengers, voiced by Keith Silverstein.
- Moon Knight appears as an unlockable playable character in Lego Marvel Super Heroes 2.
- Moon Knight appears as an unlockable playable character in Marvel Contest of Champions.
- Moon Knight appears as an unlockable playable character in Marvel Future Fight.
- Moon Knight appears as a downloadable playable character in Marvel Ultimate Alliance 3: The Black Order, voiced again by Gideon Emery.
- Moon Knight appears as a playable character in Marvel Strike Force.
- Two incarnations of Moon Knight appear in Marvel Future Revolution, voiced again by Gideon Emery. One version is a member of Omega Flight while the other hails from Earth-5468, where he became the sole survivor of Ultron's conquest.
- Moon Knight appears as an purchasable outfit in Fortnite Battle Royale.
- Moon Knight appears as a playable character in Marvel Rivals.

=== Miscellaneous ===
The MCU versions of Marc Spector / Moon Knight and Steven Grant / Mr. Knight appear as meet-and-greet characters at Avengers Campus.

Moon Knight also appears as part of the Lego Minifigures theme Marvel Series 2.

Moon Knight appears along with Luke Cage and Ghost Rider in the board game Unmatched, as part of its 2022 Marvel-themed set "Redemption Row".

== Collected editions ==
| Title | Material collected | Publication date | ISBN |
Hulk!
| Moon Knight: Countdown to Dark | Hulk! #11–15, 17–18, 20 and Marvel Preview #21 | September 2010 | 978-0-7851-4869-2 |
Moon Knight (vol. 1) (1980)
| Essential Moon Knight, Volume 1 | Moon Knight #1–10; Werewolf By Night #32–33; Marvel Spotlight #28–29; Spectacular Spider-Man #22–23; Marvel Two-In-One #52; Hulk Magazine #11–15, 17–18, 20; Marvel Preview #21 | February 2006 | 0-7851-2092-0 |
| Essential Moon Knight, Volume 2 | Moon Knight #11–30 | October 2007 | 978-0-7851-2729-1 |
| Essential Moon Knight, Volume 3 | Moon Knight #31–38; Moon Knight (vol. 2) #1–6; Marvel Fanfare #30, 38–39; Solo Avengers #3; Marvel Super-Heroes #1 | November 2009 | 978-0-7851-3070-3 |
| Moon Knight Epic Collection: Bad Moon Rising | Moon Knight #1–4; Werewolf By Night #32–33; Marvel Spotlight #28–29; Spectacular Spider-Man #22–23; Marvel Two-in-One #52; Hulk Magazine #11–15, #17–18, #20; Marvel Preview #21; Defenders #47–50 | October 2014 | 978-0-7851-9096-7 |
| Moon Knight Epic Collection: Shadows of the Moon | Moon Knight #5–23 | November 2015 | 978-0-7851-9810-9 |
| Moon Knight Epic Collection: Final Rest | Moon Knight #24–38 | January 2019 | 978-1-302-91564-3 |
| Moon Knight Omnibus, Volume 1 | Werewolf By Night #32–33; Marvel Spotlight #28–29; Defenders #47–50; Peter Parker, the Spectacular Spider-Man #22–23; Marvel Two-In-One #52; Moon Knight #1–20; Marvel Team-Up Annual #4; Amazing Spider-Man #220 and material from Defenders #51; Hulk Magazine #11–15, 17–18, 20; Marvel Preview #21 | January 2021 | 978-1-302-92686-1 |
| Moon Knight Omnibus, Volume 2 | Moon Knight #21–38, Iron Man #161, Power Man and Iron Fist #87, Marvel Team-Up #144, Moon Knight (vol. 2) #1–6, Marvel Fanfare #30 and material from Solo Avengers #3, Marvel Fanfare #38–39, Marvel Super-Heroes #1 | March 2022 | 978-1-302-93453-8 |
Moon Knight (vol. 2) (1985), Marc Spector: Moon Knight (1989), Moon Knight (vol. 3) (1998) and (vol. 4) (1999)
| Moon Knight Epic Collection: Butcher's Moon | Moon Knight (vol. 2) #1–6, Marvel Team-Up #144, Marvel Fanfare #30, Marc Spector: Moon Knight #1–7 and material from Solo Avengers #3, Marvel Fanfare #38–39, Marvel Super-Heroes #1 | September 2022 | 978-1-302-94816-0 |
| Moon Knight Epic Collection: The Trial of Marc Spector | Marc Spector: Moon Knight #8-25, material from Punisher Annual #2 | October 2024 | 978-1-302-95959-3 |
| Moon Knight Epic Collection: Scarlet Redemption | Marc Spector: Moon Knight #26-38, Amazing Spider-Man #353–358 | October 2025 | 978-1-302-96520-4 |
| Moon Knight Epic Collection: Death Watch | Marc Spector: Moon Knight #39-51, Moon Knight: Divided We Fall #1, Moon Knight Special #1, Web of Spider-Man #93-94, and material from Marvel Comics Presents #152-154 | October 2023 | 978-1-302-95380-5 |
| Moon Knight Epic Collection: The Resurrection War | Marc Spector: Moon Knight #52-60; Moon Knight (vol. 3) #1-4; Moon Knight (vol. 4) #1-4; Black Panther (vol. 3) #20-22 | October 2026 | 978-1-302-96950-9 |
| Moon Knight: Marc Spector Omnibus, Volume 1 | Marc Spector: Moon Knight #1–34, Amazing Spider-Man #353–358, Moon Knight: Divided We Fall #1 and material from Punisher Annual #2 | February 2023 | 978-1-302-95037-8 |
| Moon Knight: Marc Spector Omnibus, Volume 2 | Marc Spector: Moon Knight #35–60, Moon Knight Special #1, Web of Spider-Man (1985) #93-94, Moon Knight (vol. 3) #1-4, Moon Knight (vol. 4) #1-4, Black Panther (vol. 3) #20-22 and material from Marvel Comics Presents (vol. 1) #152-154. | March 2024 | 978-1-302-95689-9 |
Moon Knight (vol. 5) (2006)
| Moon Knight, Volume 1: The Bottom | Moon Knight (vol. 5) #1–6 | January 2007 | 978-0-7851-2542-6 |
| Moon Knight, Volume 2: Midnight Sun | Moon Knight (vol. 5) #7–13, Moon Knight Annual #1 | January 2008 | 978-0-7851-2289-0 |
| Moon Knight, Volume 3: God & Country | Moon Knight (vol. 5) #14–20 | November 2008 | 978-0-7851-2521-1 |
| Moon Knight, Volume 4: The Death of Marc Spector | Moon Knight (vol. 5) #21–25, Moon Knight: Silent Knight #1 | March 2009 | 978-0-7851-3218-9 |
| Moon Knight, Volume 5: Down South | Moon Knight (vol. 5) #26–30 | October 2009 | 978-0-7851-3171-7 |
| Moon Knight Complete Collection by Huston, Benson & Hurwitz Omnibus | Moon Knight (vol. 5) 1–30, Moon Knight Annual #1, Moon Knight: Silent Knight #1, Vengeance of the Moon Knight #1–10, Shadowland: Moon Knight #1–3 | April 2022 | 978-1-302-93456-9 |
Vengeance of the Moon Knight (2009)
| Vengeance of the Moon Knight, Volume 1: Shock and Awe | Vengeance of the Moon Knight #1–6 | July 2010 | 978-0-7851-4106-8 |
| Vengeance of the Moon Knight, Volume 2: Killed, Not Dead | Vengeance of the Moon Knight #7–10 | December 2010 | 978-0-7851-4107-5 |
Moon Knight (vol. 6) (2011)
| Moon Knight by Brian Michael Bendis & Alex Maleev, Volume 1 | Moon Knight (vol. 6) #1–7 | December 2011 | 978-0-7851-5169-2 |
| Moon Knight by Brian Michael Bendis & Alex Maleev, Volume 2 | Moon Knight (vol. 6) #8–12 | June 2012 | 978-0-7851-5171-5 |
| Moon Knight by Brian Michael Bendis & Alex Maleev: The Complete Collection | Moon Knight (vol. 6) #1–12 | March 2018 | 978-1-302-90999-4 |
Moon Knight (vol. 7) (2014)
| Moon Knight, Volume 1: From the Dead | Moon Knight (vol. 7) #1–6 | October 2014 | 978-0-7851-5408-2 |
| Moon Knight, Volume 2: Dead Will Rise | Moon Knight (vol. 7) #7–12 | April 2015 | 978-0-7851-5409-9 |
| Moon Knight, Volume 3: In The Night | Moon Knight (vol. 7) #13–17 | October 2015 | 978-0-7851-9734-8 |
Moon Knight (vol. 8) (2016)
| Moon Knight, Volume 1: Lunatic | Moon Knight (vol. 8) #1–5 | December 2016 | 978-0-7851-9953-3 |
| Moon Knight, Volume 2: Reincarnations | Moon Knight (vol. 8) #6–9 and Moon Knight (vol. 1) #2 | June 2017 | 978-0-7851-9954-0 |
| Moon Knight, Volume 3: Birth and Death | Moon Knight (vol. 8) #10–14 | October 2017 | 978-1-302-90288-9 |
| Moon Knight by Lemire & Smallwood: Complete Collection | Moon Knight (vol. 8) #1–14 | September 2018 | 978-1-302-91285-7 |
Moon Knight: Legacy (2017)
| Moon Knight: Legacy, Volume 1: Crazy Runs in the Family | Moon Knight (vol. 1) #188–193 | May 2018 | 978-1-302-90937-6 |
| Moon Knight: Legacy, Volume 2: Phases | Moon Knight (vol. 1) #194–200 | December 2018 | 978-1-302-91270-3 |
| Moon Knight: Legacy – The Complete Collection | Moon Knight (vol. 1) #188–200 | April 2022 | 978-1-302-93397-5 |
Moon Knight (vol. 9) (2021)
| Moon Knight, Volume 1: The Midnight Mission | Moon Knight (vol. 9) #1–6 | February 2022 | 978-1-302-93110-0 |
| Moon Knight, Volume 2: Too Tough To Die | Moon Knight (vol. 9) #7–12, Devil's Reign: Moon Knight #1 | September 2022 | 978-1-302-93111-7 |
| Moon Knight, Volume 3: Halfway To Sanity | Moon Knight (vol. 9) #13–18, Moon Knight Annual (vol. 3) #1 | March 2023 | 978-1-302-94734-7 |
| Moon Knight, Volume 4: Road To Ruin | Moon Knight (vol. 9) #19–24 | September 2023 | 978-1-302-94735-4 |
| Moon Knight, Volume 5: The Last Days of Moon Knight | Moon Knight (vol. 9) #25–30 | March 2024 | 978-1-302-95091-0 |
| Moon Knight by Jed MacKay Omnibus | Moon Knight (vol. 9) #1–30, Devil's Reign: Moon Knight, Moon Knight Annual (2022) #1, and material from Moon Knight Annual (2023) #1 and Avengers (vol. 8) #45. | October 2024 | 978-1-302-95948-7 |
Vengeance of the Moon Knight (vol. 2) (2024)
| Vengeance of the Moon Knight, Volume 1: New Moon | Vengeance of the Moon Knight (vol. 2) #1–4 | September 2024 | 978-1-302-95739-1 |
| Vengeance of the Moon Knight, Volume 2: It's Alive | Vengeance of the Moon Knight (vol. 2) #5-9 | February 2025 | 978-1-302-95740-7 |
Moon Knight: Fist of Khonshu (2024)
| Moon Knight: Fist of Khonshu, Volume 1: Leave Home | Moon Knight: Fist of Khonshu #0-5 | June 2025 | 978-1-302-95921-0 |
| Moon Knight: Fist of Khonshu, Volume 2: Subterranean Jungle | Moon Knight: Fist of Khonshu #6-10 | November 2025 | 978-1-302-53406-6 |
| Moon Knight: Fist of Khonshu, Volume 3: We're Outta Here | Moon Knight: Fist of Khonshu #11-15 | April 2026 | 978-1-302-53538-4 |
Marc Spector: Moon Knight (vol. 2) (2026)
| Marc Spector: Moon Knight, Volume 1 | Marc Spector: Moon Knight (vol. 2) #1-10 | January 2027 | 978-1-302-96913-4 |
Limited Series and One Shots
| Shadowland: Moon Knight | Shadowland: Moon Knight #1–3 and Moon Knight (vol. 1) #13 | March 2011 | 978-0-7851-4889-0 |
| Daredevil: Shadowland Omnibus | Shadowland: Moon Knight #1–3 and Daredevil #501–512, Shadowland #1–5, Shadowland: Blood on the Streets #1–4, Shadowland: Power Man #1–4, Shadowland: Daughters of the Shadow #1–3, Shadowland: Bullseye, Elektra, Ghost Rider and Spider-Man, Thunderbolts #148–149, Daredevil: Reborn #1–4, Dark Reign: The List - Daredevil, Shadowland: After the Fall | February 2018 | 978-1-302-91037-2 |
| Acts of Evil | Moon Knight Annual (vol. 2) #1 and Deadpool Annual (vol. 5) #1, Ghost-Spider Annual #1, Ms. Marvel Annual (vol. 2) #1, Punisher Annual (vol. 5) #1, She-Hulk Annual #1, Venom Annual (vol. 2) #1, Wolverine Annual (vol. 5) #1 | January 2020 | 978-1-302-92154-5 |
| Devil's Reign: Villains For Hire | Devil's Reign: Moon Knight #1 and Devil's Reign: Villains for Hire #1–3 | August 2022 | 978-1-302-94590-9 |
| Moon Knight: Black, White & Blood | Moon Knight: Black, White & Blood #1–4 | March 2023 | 978-1-302-94604-3 |
| Moon Knight: City of the Dead | Moon Knight: City of the Dead #1–5 | February 2024 | 978-1-302-95236-5 |
| Phases of the Moon Knight | Phases of Moon Knight (2024) #1-4 | May 2025 | 978-1302960162 |
