= Don Perlin =

American comic book artist and writer (1929–2024)

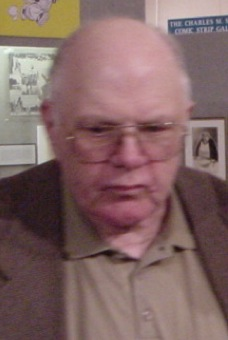
- Perlin in 2001
- Born: Donald David Perlin; August 27, 1929 New York City, U.S.
- Died: May 14, 2024 (aged 94) St. Johns, Florida, U.S.
- Areas: Writer, Penciller, Inker, Editor
- Notable works: Werewolf by Night; Moon Knight; The Defenders; Ghost Rider; Bloodshot
- Awards: National Cartoonists Society Comic Books Award (1997)

Donald David Perlin (/ˈpɜːrlɪn/; August 27, 1929 – May 14, 2024) was an American comic book artist, writer, and editor. He is best known for Marvel Comics' Werewolf by Night, Moon Knight (a character he co-created), The Defenders, and Ghost Rider. In the 1990s, he worked for Valiant Comics, both as artist and editor, where he co-created Bloodshot.

== Biography ==
=== Early life and career ===
Perlin was born on August 27, 1929, in New York City, and grew up in the Canarsie neighborhood of the borough of Brooklyn. Perlin was Jewish. At 14, he began studying art under Burne Hogarth, who taught small private classes at either his Central Park West apartment or at a rented "loft in a small building up on upper Broadway in Manhattan and on Saturday mornings we had about half a dozen students." One of them, future comics artist Al Williamson, became a friend and colleague. As the class expanded and became affiliated with the Stevenson School, Perlin could no longer afford to attend and left; he later returned as a student when Hogarth co-founded the Cartoonists and Illustrators School.

He broke into the industry in the late 1940s, later recalling, "My first job was for a company called Fox Features. It was one of those cops-and-robbers stories. I pencilled it, Pete Morisi inked it." Credits were not routinely given in most comics until the 1960s, making identification difficult, and Perlin's first confirmed work is penciling and inking the seven-page story, "Ghosts From the Underworld", by an unknown writer, in the publisher Youthful's Captain Science #3 (cover-dated April 1951). Through 1952, he did some comics work for Ziff-Davis, Hillman Periodicals and Stanley Morse, before finding his niche penciling horror-comics stories for Harvey Comics, St. John Publications, Comic Media, and the 1950s iteration of Marvel Comics, known as Atlas Comics. He recalled he spent three weeks as a ghost artist pencilling over Jules Feiffer's layouts on Will Eisner's newspaper-insert comics feature The Spirit. As he recalled the experience,

I kind of say that I worked for Will Eisner. What happened was I walked into his office when the fellow that they had doing The Spirit left. I walked in with some samples and they brought them in to Eisner, he looked at them and hired me. At that time they had a publication that they were doing called PS magazine; it was a mechanical maintenance magazine for the Army. They gave me a drawing board in the corner of the office and left me alone. Jules Feiffer was writing it. He, at that time, was in the Army stationed at Governors Island ... and he’d come in on the weekend and write a story, lay it out roughly on the boards. I’d come in on the Monday and I’d pencil it. I never saw Eisner again after that first time. I mean, while working there.

Around this time, Perlin, Morisi and Sy Barry rented a one-room studio near Cooper Union in Manhattan for $35 a month, later renting space to artist Al Gordon. The group gave up the studio in 1953 when Perlin was drafted into the United States Army.

From 1955 to 1958, Perlin concentrated on war comics for Charlton Comics, while also turning in the occasional assignment for Atlas. His credited output slowed after that, and he took on work in technical illustrating and package design for several years. He recalled,

I worked as a technical illustrator, taking blueprints and converting them to three-dimensional exploded views. I worked for a company that did the parts catalog for Boeing airliners. These were the books that the mechanics kept in the hangars so that they could order the parts. We drew every screw, washer, bolt and everything else in the planes. I got to the point where I thought I could go in there and take the plane apart with a screwdriver. ... I kind of enjoyed it. It was different. After that I went to work as a package designer for a manufacturer of paper boxes. I would do dummy artwork for the boxes and after they were approved I did the camera-ready art so that it could be printed. I worked there until one of the partners did some tricks with the books and the place went out of business.

Doing comics in the evenings after work, he drew Robur the Conqueror, an adaptation of a Jules Verne novel about a power-mad genius and his "flying apparatus", for The Gilberton Company's Classics Illustrated #162, with the first of its three printings cover-dated May 1961. In 1962 he began an 11-year stint drawing almost exclusively for Charlton, across a variety of genres, from war to romance comics to hot-rod sports stories. Occasional artwork for other companies included the TV-series tie-in Hogan's Heroes #4 (March 1967), for Dell Comics, and comics biographies of Thurgood Marshall and Dr. Martin Luther King Jr. for Fitzgerald Publications.

=== Later career ===
In 1974 he began a long association with Marvel, where he was a full-time penciler until 1987. He earlier had freelanced, initially on a Dr. Strange story by writer Gardner Fox in Marvel Premiere #5 (Nov. 1972), inking Sam Kweskin (credited as "Irv Wesley"), and co-penciling two issues of Thor with John Buscema in 1973, among other work, including a smattering for rival DC Comics' supernatural anthologies. He had continued in commercial art and package design as his primary employment all these years, Perlin recalled, when had an offer to return to comics full-time:

I was going for a job interview with another company to do paste-ups and mechanicals. This was before computers. I was going in on Monday morning and Sunday morning I got a call from [Marvel Comics editor-in-chief] Roy Thomas. I'd been doing some comic book work in the evenings when I got home from working at the different day jobs that I had. Roy had seen some of the horror stories that I had done for DC. He told me about two books that they were looking for artists for and asked if would I be interested? One of them was Werewolf By Night and the other was [the feature] "Morbius the Living Vampire" [in the comic Adventure into Fear]. When I went to Marvel and spoke to them I was told the Werewolf [comic] was a monthly and Morbius was [in] a bimonthly [comic], so I took the monthly book deciding that would be a great job.

Perlin drew Werewolf by Night #17–43 (May 1974 – March 1977), a run that introduced the character Moon Knight, co-created with writer Doug Moench. He went on to become the regular artist for the supernatural-motorcyclist series Ghost Rider from 1977 to 1981, and a handful of other issues through 1983. He also contributed stories starring characters including the Inhumans, Spider-Man, and the Sub-Mariner.

Perlin and writer Roger McKenzie developed the idea of Captain America running for the office of President of the United States. Marvel originally rejected the idea but it would be used later by Roger Stern and John Byrne in Captain America #250 (Oct. 1980). McKenzie and Perlin received credit for the idea on the letters page at Stern's insistence. McKenzie and Perlin would also receive credit in the follow-up story in What If? #26 (April 1981).

In 1980, Perlin began working on Man-Thing with Chris Claremont, beginning with a crossover with Doctor Strange and continuing until the second to last issue of the series in 1981. From 1980–1986, Perlin was the regular (and longest-serving) artist on the superhero-team title The Defenders, which Perlin said gave him "a chance to draw almost every character Marvel had at one time or another." Perlin penciled Transformers for nearly two years from early 1986 to late 1987, and then became Marvel's de facto managing art director, a role he served from 1987–1991:

[W]hile I was doing the Transformers, [editor-in-chief] Jim Shooter asked me to come up there and work as an art director. The senior art director at the time was John Romita, the executive art director. I was what you’d call the managing art director. [In that job, he would] take three budding young cartoonists, who were a smidgen away from being professionals, pay them minimum wage, no benefits whatsoever, no sick leave or holidays. When you worked, you got paid. They stayed for a year to do the changes and corrections in the artwork. The editors would bring the pages and things that they wanted changed, corrected or fixed or whatever, and it was up to me to see that was done. I was training these young guys and after about a year they were ready to go out and get work. That was the primary purpose of that job. I was a teacher more or less. I left there to go over to Shooter when he formed his new company, Valiant Comics.

He joined Jim Shooter's Valiant Comics in 1991, pencilling the series Solar, Man of the Atom and Bloodshot and editing Solar, Man of the Atom, Shadowman, and Magnus Robot Fighter. Shortly after Valiant's mid-1990s takeover by Acclaim Entertainment, Perlin went into semi-retirement. His last known published comics work for quite some time was pencilling and inking the 12-page story "Caves of Castle Finn" in DC Comics' TV-animation tie-in Scooby-Doo #25 (Aug. 1999). In 2012, Perlin pencilled a new Bloodshot story ("The Tablet") for the Bloodshoot: Blood of the Machine Hardcover, written by Kevin VanHook and inked by Bob Wiacek, his original collaborators on the series.

== Personal life and death ==
Perlin was married to Becky Perlin. The couple has two daughters and three sons.

Perlin died on May 14, 2024, at the age of 94.

== Awards ==
Perlin won the 1997 National Cartoonists Society Comic Books Award.

== Bibliography of series as regular artist ==
(as penciller if not noted otherwise)

=== DC Comics ===
- Ghosts #24, 26, 28, 36 (1974–1975)
- House of Mystery #252 (1977)
- Scooby-Doo #24–25, 29, 33 (1999–2000)
- Secrets of Sinister House #16 (1974)
- The Unexpected #154–155, 174 (1974–1976)
- Weird War Tales #12, 15, 20 (1973)
- Witching Hour #44–45, 52, 69, 71 (1974–1977)

=== Marvel Comics ===
- Beauty and the Beast miniseries (Beast/Dazzler) #1–4 (1984)
- Captain America (inker) #229–234, 236–240, 243; (penciller) #242, 244 (1978–1980)
- The Defenders (layouts, finished by others including Joe Sinnott, Jim Mooney, Pablo Marcos, and Bob Wiacek) #82–111 and 113; (penciller) #112, 114–118, 120–125, 129, 132, 134–145, 147, 149–152 (April 1980 – Feb. 1986)
- Ghost Rider #26–34, 36–42, 45–60 (Oct. 1977 – Sept. 1981), #67 (April 1982), #71 (Aug. 1982), #76–77 (Jan.–Feb. 1983)
- Man-Thing Vol. 2 #4-8, 10 (May 1980–May 1981)
- Thor #210-213 (April-July 1973), #332 (June 1983)
- Transformers: #13–15, 17–19, 21–32, 35 (breakdowns only #31–32) (Feb. 1986 – Dec. 1987)
- Transformers: The Movie (layouts only) #1–3 (Dec. 1986 – Feb. 1987)
- Werewolf by Night #17–43 (May 1974 – March 1977)

=== Valiant Comics ===
- Bad Eggs #1–8 (1996)
- Bloodshot #1–3, 5–7, 9–17 (1992–1994)
- Solar, Man of the Atom #1–4, 6–7, 9–10, 12–13, 18–19 (1991–1992)
- Timewalker #1–4, 9, 12–13 (1994–1995)

Preceded by Mike Ploog	Werewolf by Night artist 1974–1977	Succeeded by N/A
Preceded by Don Heck	Ghost Rider artist 1977–1981	Succeeded by Alan Kupperberg
Preceded by Mike Esposito and John Tartaglione	Captain America inker 1979	Succeeded by Pablo Marcos
Preceded by Jim Mooney	Man-Thing artist 1980-1981	Succeeded by Val Mayerik
Preceded by Herb Trimpe	The Defenders artist 1980–1986	Succeeded by N/A
Preceded by Herb Trimpe	Transformers artist 1986–1987	Succeeded by José Delbo
Preceded by N/A	Solar, Man of the Atom artist 1991–1992	Succeeded by Steve Ditko
Preceded by N/A	Bloodshot artist 1993–1994	Succeeded by Mike Vosburg
