= Mike Benson (screenwriter) =

American comic book and television writer and showrunner

- Born: Michael Benson; United States
- Citizenship: United States
- Occupations: Writer, producer, actor
- Writing career
- Notable works: Entourage; Moon Knight

Mike Benson is an American comic book and television writer, actor and showrunner.

== Career ==
Benson worked as a writer and co-executive producer on The Bernie Mac Show and Entourage with his writing and producing partner Marc Abrams. In 2006, Benson and Abrams founded their own production company Catapult 360, which signed a two-year deal with Universal Media Studios to develop and produce drama, comedy and reality programming. In 2009, the company was reported to produce Scar Tissue with Anthony Kiedis for HBO, based on the book of the same name. Benson has also written for comics, where his credits include short stories about Punisher, Wolverine and Shang-Chi, a year-long run on Moon Knight, and a Luke Cage mini-series for the Marvel Noir line.

== Filmography ==
- Local Heroes (1996)
- The Secret Diary of Desmond Pfeiffer (1998)
- Big Wolf on Campus (2000)
- The Bernie Mac Show (2001–2006)
- Entourage:
  - "One Day in the Valley" (2006)
  - "Strange Days" (2006)
  - "Manic Monday" (2007)

== Bibliography ==
=== Marvel Comics ===
- The Punisher vol. 7 Annual #1: "The Hunted" (with Laurence Campbell, Marvel MAX, 2007) collected in Punisher MAX: The Complete Collection Volume 5 (tpb, 504 pages, 2017, ISBN 1-302-90274-1)
- Moon Knight vol. 2 (with issues #14–19 scripted by Benson from plots by Charlie Huston; art by Javier Saltares, Mark Texeira, Mike Deodato Jr. (#20) and Jefte Palo (#26–30), 2008–2009) collected as:
  - God and Country (collects #14–20, hc, 184 pages, 2008, ISBN 0-7851-2892-1; tpb, 2008, ISBN 0-7851-2521-3)
  - The Death of Marc Spector (collects #21–25, hc, 152 pages, 2009, ISBN 0-7851-3218-X; tpb, 2009, ISBN 0-7851-3298-8)
  - Down South (collects #26–30, hc, 120 pages, 2009, ISBN 0-7851-3158-2; tpb, 2009, ISBN 0-7851-3171-X)
  - Moon Knight by Huston, Benson and Hurwitz Omnibus (includes #14–30, hc, 1,184 pages, 2022, ISBN 1-302-93456-2)
- Wolverine: Chop Shop (with Roland Boschi, one-shot, 2009) collected in Wolverine: Flies to a Spider (tpb, 112 pages, 2009, ISBN 0-7851-3569-3)
- Deadpool:
  - Deadpool: Suicide Kings (hc, 152 pages, 2009, ISBN 0-7851-4172-3; tpb, 2009, ISBN 0-7851-4041-7) collects:
    - Deadpool: Games of Death (with Shawn Crystal, one-shot, 2009)
    - Deadpool: Suicide Kings #1–5 (with Carlo Barberi; issues #3–5 are co-written by Benson and Adam Glass, 2009)
  - Deadpool vol. 2 #900: "Shrunken Master" (with Damion Scott, co-feature, 2009) collected in Deadpool: Dead Head Redemption (tpb, 240 pages, 2011, ISBN 0-7851-5649-6)
  - Deadpool Team-Up #898: "Bring Me the Head of Mickey Dobbs" (with Carlo Barberi, 2009) collected in Deadpool Team-Up: Good Buddies (hc, 176 pages, 2010, ISBN 0-7851-4528-1; tpb, 2010, ISBN 0-7851-4529-X)
  - Deadpool Pulp #1–4 (co-written by Benson and Adam Glass, art by Laurence Campbell, 2010–2011) collected as Deadpool Pulp (hc, 112 pages, 2011, ISBN 0-7851-4893-0; tpb, 2011, ISBN 0-7851-4871-X)
- Luke Cage:
  - Luke Cage Noir #1–4 (co-written by Benson and Adam Glass, art by Shawn Martinbrough, 2009–2010) collected as Luke Cage Noir (hc, 112 pages, 2010, ISBN 0-7851-3942-7; tpb, 2010, ISBN 0-7851-3545-6)
  - Avengers Origins: Luke Cage (co-written by Benson and Adam Glass, art by Dalibor Talajić, one-shot, 2012) collected in Avengers: Mythos (hc, 208 pages, 2012, ISBN 0-7851-5350-0; tpb, 2013, ISBN 0-7851-4860-4)
- Shang-Chi:
  - Shang-Chi, Master of Kung Fu: Black and White: "Once Upon a Time in Wan Chai" (with Tomm Coker and C. P. Smith, anthology one-shot, 2009)
  - Deadly Hands of Kung Fu vol. 2 #1–4 (with Tan Eng Huat, 2014) collected as Deadly Hands of Kung Fu: Out of the Past (tpb, 160 pages, 2014, ISBN 0-7851-9078-3)
- Breaking into Comics the Marvel Way! #1: "Let Sleeping Devils Lie" (with Mick Bertilorenzi, anthology, 2010)
- Curse of the Mutants: X-Men vs. Vampires #2: "Flesh, Fangs and Burnt Rubber" (with Mark Texeira, anthology, 2010) collected in X-Men: Curse of the Mutants — Mutants vs. Vampires (hc, 120 pages, 2011, ISBN 0-7851-5294-6; tpb, 2011, ISBN 0-7851-5229-6)
- Captain America #616: "Operation: Tooth Fairy" (with Paul Grist, co-feature, 2011) collected in Captain America: Prisoner of War (hc, 144 pages, 2011, ISBN 0-7851-5119-2; tpb, 2011, ISBN 0-7851-5120-6)
- A+X #11: "Thor + Magik" (with Mark Texeira, anthology, 2013) collected in A+X = Amazing (tpb, 136 pages, 2013, ISBN 0-7851-6675-0)
- Secret Wars Journal #4: "Primary Function" (with Laura Braga, anthology, 2015) collected in Secret Wars Journal/Battleworld (tpb, 248 pages, 2016, ISBN 0-7851-9580-7)

=== Other publishers ===
- Batman: Streets of Gotham #8–9: "Hardcore Nights" (with Dustin Nguyen, DC Comics, 2010) collected in Batman: Streets of Gotham — Leviathan (hc, 160 pages, 2010, ISBN 1-4012-2905-0; tpb, 2011, ISBN 1-4012-2906-9)
- Brik #1–6 (co-written by Benson and Adam Glass, art by Harwinder Singh, Oni Press, 2016) collected as Brik (tpb, 160 pages, 2017, ISBN 1-62010-392-3)
- Cain (co-written by Benson and Walter Hill, art by Beni Lobel, graphic novel, 88 pages, Dark Horse, 2023, ISBN 1-50673-754-4)
- Gray Lady (co-written by Benson and Adam Glass, art by Ken Lashley, one-shot, Ninth Circle, 2025)

== Awards and nominations ==
- Winner of 2010 Glyph Comics Fan Award for Best Comic for "Luke Cage Noir"
- Nominated in 2008 for WGA (TV) Comedy Series Award for "Entourage"
- Nominated in 2007 for Emmy Award for Outstanding Comedy Series for "Entourage"
- Nominated in 2006 for Golden Globe for Best Television Series for "Entourage"
- Nominated in 2005 for BET Comedy Award Outstanding Writing for a Comedy Series for "The Bernie Mac Show"
- Winner of 2004 Humanitas Award for "The Bernie Mac Show"
- Winner of 2003 Humanitas Award for "The Bernie Mac Show"
- Winner of 2001 Peabody Award for "The Bernie Mac Show"

Preceded by Charlie Huston	Moon Knight writer 2008–2009	Succeeded by Gregg Hurwitz
