= Morpheus (Marvel Comics) =

- Morpheus battles Moon Knight

Publication information
- Publisher: Marvel Comics
- First appearance: Moon Knight #12 (Aug. 1981)
- Created by: Doug Moench and Bill Sienkiewicz

In-story information
- Alter ego: Robert Markham
- Species: Human mutate
- Abilities: Mental projection, psionic energy blast, no need of sleep

Morpheus is a fictional character appearing in American comic books published by Marvel Comics.

== Publication history ==
Morpheus first appeared in Moon Knight #12 (Aug. 1981), and was created by Doug Moench and Bill Sienkiewicz. The character subsequently appeared in Moon Knight #22-23 (August–September 1982), Moon Knight vol. 2 #3 (Sept. 1985), Doctor Strange, Sorcerer Supreme #18 (June 1990), and Moon Knight: Resurrection War #2-4 (Feb.–April 1998).

Morpheus received an entry in the original The Official Handbook of the Marvel Universe #7.

== Fictional character biography ==
Robert Markham was born in New York City. He had an unprecedented viral infection that caused competitive inhibition of certain segments in his DNA in the process of replication. He consults Dr. Peter Alraune, who prescribes an experimental, untested drug. The drug reacts with Markham's DNA, causing a freakish appearance and the inability to sleep. Markham discovers that he no longer needs sleep, and that he now has a highly destructive psionic ability. He names himself Morpheus, the Greek god of sleep. Crazed, Morpheus seeks to punish Dr. Alraune, which brought him to the attention of Moon Knight, a wealthy vigilante. In the resulting fight, Morpheus is defeated.

=== Nightmares ===
Under heavy sedation, Morpheus is taken to the Seaview Research Hospital. He is given an artificially-induced sleep period every day. This, for a time, results in normal dreams. Morpheus' brain undergoes further mutations. He establishes a mental link with Alraune. Through him, Morpheus projects nightmares into the minds of the unwilling. He eventually escapes from Seaview and seeks revenge on Moon Knight and Alraune. The doctor sacrifices himself in a successful effort to cancel out Morpeus' powers. He is returned to Seaview under heavy guard.

Morpheus later awakes from his induced sleep due to a medication mix up. He holds hospital and Marlene hostage until Moon Knight intervenes.

== Powers and abilities ==
Morpheus no longer needs or desires to sleep. The lack of sleep results in the accumulation of a destructive psionic ability which he calls 'Ebon energy'. To prevent himself of becoming "overloaded", he has to release it now and then. Sleep, natural or artificial, will stop the energy from building up. He also has the telepathic ability to cause nightmares.

== In other media ==
Morpheus is featured as an enemy in the Moon Knight virtual pinball game for Pinball FX 2 released by Zen Studios.
