= Khonshu (Marvel Comics) =

- Khonshu as depicted in Moon Knight Vol. 9 #1 (July 2021). Art by Jung-Geun Yoon.

Publication information
- Publisher: Marvel Comics
- First appearance: Moon Knight #1 (November 1980)
- Created by: Doug Moench and Bill Sienkiewicz

In-story information
- Team affiliations: Heliopolitan Gods
- Abilities: Superhuman strength; Regenerative healing factor; Immortality; Magic manipulation; Telepathy; Teleportation

Khonshu is a fictional character appearing in American comic books published by Marvel Comics. The character first appeared in Moon Knight #1 (November 1980), was created by Doug Moench and Bill Sienkiewicz, and is based on the Egyptian lunar god Khonsu. He is a member of the Heliopolitan pantheon and the patron of the superhero Moon Knight.

Khonshu appears in the live-action Marvel Cinematic Universe (MCU) miniseries Moon Knight, performed by Karim El-Hakim and voiced by F. Murray Abraham.

== Publication history ==
While Khonshu possessed Moon Knight during the hero's time with the West Coast Avengers, Khonshu was often shown as a largely benevolent god who wanted to assist the team. He was at times shown to be conflicted as to whether he should reveal his powers and what was worthy of it.

However, he is shown to become more and more of an antagonistic role to Moon Knight starting in the 2006 series, where he would later become the main antagonist of the 2016 Moon Knight series, and the age of Khonshu storyline in Jason Aaron's run.

Moon Knight volume #4 initially treats Khonshu in a rather different way, portraying him as a harsh and unforgiving god of vengeance who is strengthened by the fear that his avatar inspires. Accordingly, he is quite prepared to manipulate Marc Spector's allies and enemies in order to revive Moon Knight's career, and is highly critical of Spector. As with many Moon Knight stories, the line between reality and hallucination is sometimes intentionally blurred, but aspects of the art and story do strongly suggest that Khonshu's actions are entirely real. Khonshu also appears as a statue, but primarily converses with Moon Knight in the mutilated form of Bushman, a villain who was killed when Moon Knight carved off his face.

== Fictional character biography ==
Chons, better known as Khonshu, is said to be the son of Atum (known to the Egyptian gods as Ammon Ra) and of Amaunet, air goddess of the Ogdoad pantheon. Another account stated that Khonshu was the adopted son of Amon Ra. He was the brother of Montu, and possibly Bes and Ptah, and was brother or half-brother to Bast and Sekhmet.

Around the year 1,000,000 BC, Khonshu was offended by not having been offered membership of the Stone Age Avengers and chose a mortal avatar – the first known Moon Knight – to enforce his will on Earth and antagonize the Avengers on his behalf, eventually leading to the establishment of the Cult of Khonshu and a succession of Moon Knights. Khonshu and Ra have been warring against each other for millennia, with Khonshu beating Ra in every instance.

Khonshu visited Marc Spector, a young boy whose mind was broken and split into different personalities, and chose him as his avatar. However, Spector's family sent him to Putnam Psychiatric Hospital for treatment. After his father's death, Spector was allowed to leave the hospital temporarily to attend the funeral, but ran away after hearing Khonshu's voice.

In the modern day, Khonshu resurrects Marc Spector and gives him superhuman powers and abilities under the Moon. When Spector and Marlene Alraune travel to Egypt, Alraune is kidnapped by Jellim Yussaf, who intends to find the treasure hidden in the Tomb of Seti II. Moon Knight tracks them down and finds the lost chamber, falling into the arms of a statue of Khonshu. Khonshu sends down a gust of wind, allowing Moon Knight to glide down to knock out Yussaf. Spector decides to retire as a vigilante and sells his statue of Khonshu. Khonshu visits Spector in his dreams, hoping to bring him back as his champion on Earth. Spector gives in and recovers the statue.

In a flashback depicted in the "Blood Hunt" storyline, Khonshu assembles an alliance of the gods from the West (Ennead) and West (Orisha) of Africa, in the region where the nation of Wakanda is located. Bast, Eshu, Gherke, Ptah, and Kokou the Ever-Burning go on to battle Varnae after he steals vibranium from the Fires of Ptah. In the present, Hunter's Moon and Tigra free Khonshu from an Asgardian prison with help from Wrecker.

== Powers and abilities ==
Khonshu has the conventional powers of the Ennead (the Heliopolitan gods), such as superhuman strength (Khonshu can bench press 60 tons), superhuman durability (he can withstand unspecified levels of injury), a regenerative healing factor (Khonshu can be injured, but heals much faster and better than the healthiest human), immortality (he is immune to disease and aging), magic manipulation (Khonshu can manipulate mystic energies for supernatural effects such as interdimensional teleportation, telepathy, healing, resurrection, causing earthquakes and granting superhuman powers to mortal beings such as the Moon Knight), lunakinesis (manipulating objects made out of moonrocks, including Uru), and power absorption (Khonshu stole the powers of various heroes and stored them inside some Ankhs).

== Other versions ==
=== Ultimate Universe ===
An alternate universe version of Khonshu from Earth-6160 appears in the Ultimate Universe imprint. This version is a member of the Maker's Council and ruler of the theocratic Upper and Lower Kingdoms.

=== Universe X ===
In the Universe X saga, it is suggested that Uatu the Watcher, who lives on the moon, inspired the legends of Khonshu.

== In other media ==
- The Khonshu-possessed Marc Spector appears as an alternate skin for Moon Knight in Marvel: Ultimate Alliance.
- Khonshu appears in Moon Knight, motion-captured by Karim El-Hakim and voiced by F. Murray Abraham. This version is an outcast amongst his fellow Egyptian gods for waging a "one-god war on perceived injustices", which necessitates him to find and use his avatar, Marc Spector. Additionally, Khonshu was described by the series' head writer Jeremy Slater as an "imperious and sort of snotty and vengeful" deity, who is prone to temper tantrums and is dealing with his own insecurities, adding he was more interested in a version of the character that had "his own moral failings and weaknesses" rather than one who was "always right and impervious to mistakes". Abraham called Khonshu "outrageous" and "capable of doing anything and charming his way out of it". As well, Abraham believed Khonshu was unselfish and willing to sacrifice himself the same way he demands sacrifice from others.
  - An alternate timeline variant of Khonshu appears in Marvel Zombies (2025), voiced by F. Murray Abraham. This version chose Blade to become Moon Knight after Marc Spector was killed during the zombie outbreak.
