= Bushman (character) =

Marvel Comics fictional character

- Cover art for Moon Knight vol. 3 #4. Art by David Finch.

Publication information
- Publisher: Marvel Comics
- First appearance: Moon Knight #1 (Nov. 1980)
- Created by: Doug Moench; Bill Sienkiewicz

In-story information
- Alter ego: Raul Bushman
- Species: Human
- Notable aliases: Roald Armand Bushman; Raoul Bushman
- Abilities: Peak human physical condition Razor-sharp metal teeth Carries various weapons

Raoul Bushman is a fictional character appearing in American comic books published by Marvel Comics. He is depicted as the archenemy of Moon Knight. He is interchangeably also known as Roald Bushman.

== Publication history ==
Bushman's first appearance was in Moon Knight #1 (Nov. 1980), and he was created by Doug Moench.

The character subsequently appears in Moon Knight #9-10 (July–Aug. 1981), Marc Spector: Moon Knight #1-3 (June–Aug. 1989), #11-16 (Feb.–July 1990), #37 (April 1992), Moon Knight: Resurrection War #1 (Jan. 1998), #3-4 (March–April 1998), Moon Knight vol. 3 #2-3 (July–Aug. 2006), #6 (Nov. 2006) and #10 (July 2007) and Vengeance of the Moon Knight #3-6 (Nov. 2009-March 2010).

Bushman returns during the corporate-wide relaunch Marvel Legacy which starts with Moon Knight issue #188, written by Max Bemis, who also has mental health disorders, and drawn by Jacen Burrows.

Bushman received an entry in the Official Handbook of the Marvel Universe Update '89 #1.

== Fictional character biography ==
Bushman worked as a mercenary in Sudan with Marc Spector as his former right-hand man. Bushman and his men came upon Dr. Peter Alraune and his daughter Marlene Alraune and attempted to kill both in order to steal the Egyptian gold Alraune had discovered. When Spector, disgusted by Bushman's senseless murder, tries to save Alraune and his daughter, Bushman kills Peter Alraune, then beats Spector to the brink of death. It is while lying near death that Spector encounters the spirit of Khonshu and adopts the identity of Moon Knight. In this new guise, Spector defeats Bushman. He also rescues the Alraunes and their discovered Egyptian gold.

=== Death and return ===
Moon Knight confronts Bushman and carves off his face before killing him. Some time later, Bushman is supernaturally resurrected by the Hood using Dormammu's powers. He recruits Scarecrow to break into Ravencroft, where they lobotomize the patients to create an army. Moon Knight is able to stop the army and tracks down Bushman. Khonshu demands that Moon Knight sacrifice Bushman for him, but Moon Knight refuses to kill him again. Bushman is last seen in a straight jacket in a mental asylum.

Raoul Bushman resurfaces as a crack dealer and meets "Patient 86", who became an avatar of Ra called the Sun King. They come up with a plot to kill Moon Knight. Bushman kidnaps Marlene, then forces Moon Knight to board a ship to an island showdown with Sun King. During the boat ride, Raoul gets two fingers cut off and eventually abandons Sun King when he is defeated by Moon Knight.

== Powers and abilities ==
Bushman has no superhuman powers, but he is an expert in guerrilla warfare and highly proficient in the use of most conventional firearms. He has peak human physical strength and is highly athletic and agile. He sometimes uses metal teeth so that in hand-to-hand combat he can draw his enemy in close to him to tear the enemy apart with his teeth.

== In other media ==
Bushman is featured as an enemy in the Moon Knight virtual pinball game for Pinball FX 2 released by Zen Studios.
