= Click (2010 film) =

2010 horror film by Sangeeth Sivan

- Theatrical release poster
- Directed by: Sangeeth Sivan
- Written by: Harish Nayar
- Based on: Shutter by Banjong Pisanthanakun and Parkpoom Wongpoom
- Produced by: Sangeeth Sivan; Sanjay Ahluwalia; Vinay Chowksey
- Starring: Shreyas Talpade; Sadha; Sneha Ullal; Rehan Khan; Chunky Pandey
- Cinematography: Ramji
- Edited by: Chirag Jain
- Music by: Songs: Shamir Tandon; Background Score: Sandeep Chowta
- Distributed by: Pritish Nandy Communications
- Release date: 19 February 2010
- Running time: 127 minutes
- Country: India
- Language: Hindi
- Budget: ₹7.5 crore
- Box office: ₹1.6 crore

Click is a 2010 Indian Hindi-language supernatural horror film directed by Sangeeth Sivan, starring Shreyas Talpade, Sadha, Sneha Ullal, Rehan Khan, and Chunky Pandey. It is the third unofficial Indian adaptation of the 2004 Thai horror film Shutter, following the 2006 Telugu version, Photo, and the 2007 Tamil version, Sivi. Overall, it is the fourth adaptation, preceded by the 2008 official American remake, also titled Shutter. The film centers on a photographer and his girlfriend who start to experience paranormal events after accidentally hitting a woman with their car.

The film was released on 19 February 2010, receiving praise for the performances and the climax, and criticism for the length. It ended up as a major box office disappointment, grossing ₹1.6 crore worldwide against a budget of ₹7.5 crore.

== Plot ==
Avi is an ace photographer who is in a live-in relationship with Sonia, a model. One night, while returning from a party, the couple accidentally hits a young girl with their speeding car. As Sonia was driving, to avoid further complications, Avi insists on fleeing from the accident scene. But trouble starts for the couple soon after strange white marks begin to appear in Avi's photos, and Sonia starts having spooky experiences. Avi also develops severe neck pain, and even though he does not appear to be overweight, a scale reveals that he weighs 120 kilograms (264.6 pounds). Avi, too, starts having experiences similar to Sonia's. The couple is petrified when all of Avi's best friends commit suicide in a similar manner. It then comes to light that the spirit haunting them has a connection to Avi's college life. Meanwhile, Sonia finds out that Avi was friends with a girl named Aarti Kaushik during his college days.

As Avi and Sonia are still being haunted by Aarti, they go and visit her, but realize that Aarti is dead, having apparently committed suicide by using a knife. Aarti's mother believes that she is still alive, thinking that she is merely ill and will recover. On the way home, Aarti continues to haunt Avi and Sonia, and again during the night at the hotel, she also haunts Avi in his sleep, ending with him being thrown off the fire escape.

Later, Avi is in the hospital, and Sonia tells him that Aarti will be cremated. They visit her funeral before returning to their hometown. Sonia finds some photos of Aarti, where she is crawling to get something. As she follows the pattern indicated by Aarti, Sonia discovers that Avi's best friends (who later committed suicide) had raped Aarti. When Sonia talks to Avi about this dark secret, he tells her that he only wanted Aarti to understand his feelings, but when his best friends tried to talk to her, Aarti hurt Avi's friend Tarun, who became angry and, along with another friend, raped her. Avi claims that when he entered the room, he was shocked at the scene and tried to help her, but Tarun then accused Avi of planning the rape, saying it was Avi who had asked them to do it to avoid jail, and that one of Avi's friends had taken the pictures. Avi then tells Sonia that the reason he kept the photos was to remind himself that he failed to protect Aarti and says he is the guilty one. But Sonia leaves him and wishes that Aarti may forgive him.

Later on, Avi attempts to kill himself in the same way his best friends did, but as a Polaroid camera clicks towards him, he sees Aarti sitting on his shoulders. Avi is suddenly thrown through the window and ends up in the hospital, where it is revealed that the reason she was sitting on his shoulders was because Aarti had still loved Avi. As Sonia takes another photograph of Avi, she speaks to Aarti, asserting that one day she will let go, as the reflection in the mirror shows Aarti still leaning on Avi's back.

== Cast ==
- Shreyas Talpade as Avi
- Sadha as Sonia Kaushal
- Sneha Ullal as Aarti Kaushik
- Rehan Khan as Tarun
- Chunky Pandey as Manu Sharma
- Avtar Gill as Ali bhai
- Riya Sen in a special appearance
- Shishir Sharma as Aarti's uncle
- Jyoti Dogra as Suman, Aarti's mother
- Kavitta Verma

== Development ==
Sangeeth Sivan, after having directed comedies Kya Kool Hain Hum and Apna Sapna Money Money and the action-thriller Ek: The Power of One, came up with the idea of an urban horror film with Shreyas Talpade and Rehan Khan. Sivan was looking at youngsters who were not too exposed, and had previously worked with Talpade in Apna Sapna Money Money, while Khan was just two films old after Jaana... Let's Fall in Love and Awarapan. Similarly, Sneha Ullal and Sadha were signed in for the film, and its shoot was scheduled to commence from 1 September 2007 and expected to wrap up by 5 December 2007. This also served as the first production by Sivan.

When questioned if it was an unofficial remake of the 2004 Thai horror film Shutter, Sivan claimed that he saw a lot of horror films before filming Click and while Shutter was also one of them, he did not plagiarize from the Thai horror film and only drew some references from those films he watched. This was eventually proven wrong when the film was released and critics accused it of being an unofficial remake that did not credit the original film.

== Soundtrack ==
The music was composed by Shamir Tandon and released by T-Series. All lyrics were penned by Shabbir Ahmed.

Click

Soundtrack album by Shamir Tandon
- Released: Sep 2, 2010
- Recorded: 2010
- Genre: Soundtrack
- Length: 45:19
- Label: T-Series
- Producer: Shamir Tandon

Shamir Tandon chronology
Mittal v/s Mittal (2010)	Click (2010)	Utt Pataang (2011)

Track list
No.	Title	Singer(s)	Length
1.	"Rubayee (Duet)"	Sunidhi Chauhan, Raaj	6:02
2.	"Aameen Suma Aameen"	Master Saleem	4:29
3.	"Mehroom"	Shaan, Shreya Ghoshal	4:59
4.	"Click"	Adnan Sami	5:08
5.	"Yaadein"	KK, Sunidhi Chauhan	6:35
6.	"Rubayee"	Raaj	5:26
7.	"Yaadein" (Remix)	Raaj	5:32
8.	"Rubayee" (Remix)	Raaj	7:08
Total length:			45:19

Joginder Tuteja from Bollywood Hungama gave the soundtrack 2 stars out 5, singling Rubayee and Yaadein out for praise.

== Release ==
=== Theatrical ===
The film was released theatrically on 19 February 2010. A Tamil dubbed version titled Monica House was released in January 2016.

=== Home media ===
Moser Baer released the film on DVD and VCD in India. Reviewing the DVD, Joginder Tuteja from Bollywood Hungama gave the film 3 stars out of 5 and praised it, adding that the DVD came in a regular plastic case with no special features and priced at ₹99/- only, it had a 16:9 anamorphic widescreen presentation with English subtitles and audio tracks in Dolby Digital 5.1 and stereo.

Internationally, the film was distributed on DVD in the UK by Gurpreet Video International.

== Reception ==
=== Critical response ===
Nithya Ramani of Rediff.com gave the film three stars out of five, lauding the performances, effects, background music and cinematography, while feeling the songs were unnecessary. Taran Adarsh from Bollywood Hungama felt the film was heavily inspired by the Thai film Shutter, and awarding the film two and a half stars out of five, praised the performances, sound design, background score and the culmination to the story. However, he remained critical of the spirit's makeup and found the songs "strictly okay" but worsened by their non-promotion. A reviewer from Zee News gave the film two stars out of five, and while calling it a melange of intended terror and unintended humour, also labelled it a "shiver giver" that seemed original and could not be faulted for cracking the horror genre with a basic amount of finesse. Writing for Times of India, Gaurav Malani gave the film two stars out of five, criticising the film for not crediting the Thai original and felt the writing was contrived while the cinematography was "no great shakes" and the editing, lousy. Nonetheless, he also found the culmination "inventive and interestingly handled." Another reviewer from the same website gave the film two and a half out of five, remarking that the film worked only in fits and starts, and while Talpade did try hard to keep the momentum going, the campy special effects left a lot to be desired. The reviewer, however, recommended the film for the final twist and some goosebumps in the beginning.

Writing for NDTV, Anupama Chopra gave the film one and a half stars out of five, accusing Sivan of stealing liberally from the 2008 Hollywood remake of Shutter and still failing at stringing together the material coherently. Shubhra Gupta of Indian Express gave the film one star out of five, calling it Sivan's tribute to Japanese horror films, while feeling he was so busy setting the scene that he ignored the bumps and holes in his story. Rajeev Masand from IBNLive also gave it one star out of five, finding the film unintentionally hilarious and remarking that while it was "generously inspired" by the 2008 Shutter, it also borrowed visual references from countless Japanese and Korean films. Sudhish Kamath from The Hindu called the film a "shameless rip-off from Shutter" and a "cheesy, exploitative horror film that doesn't waste any time trying to set it up." Minty Tejpal from Bangalore Mirror criticised the special effects, felt the film was shot poorly, found the music ordinary and the acting below average while finding the direction quite shoddy.

=== Box office ===
The film grossed ₹1.36 crore (US$140,000) in India, failing commercially.
