= Strangeways, Here We Come (disambiguation) =

Strangeways Here We Come can refer to:

- Strangeways, Here We Come (album) - 1987 music album by The Smiths
- Strangeways Here We Come (film) - 2017 film directed by Chris Green

== See also ==
- HM Prison Manchester, of which Strangeways is a former name, and so the phrase implies that the speaker is going to jail
