= Scarlet Scarab =

Marvel Comics character

- Layla El-Faouly / Scarlet Scarab. Textless variant cover of Moon Knight: City of the Dead #4 (October 2023). Art by Liu Xiaotong.

Publication information
- Publisher: Marvel Comics
- First appearance: First: The Invaders #23 (December 1977); Second: The Mighty Thor #326 (December 1982); Third: "The Goldfish Problem"; Moon Knight (March 2022)
- Created by: First: Roy Thomas; Archie Goodwin; Frank Robbins; Second: Doug Moench; Alan Kupperberg; Third: Jeremy Slater; Mohamed Diab

In-story information
- Alter ego: First: Abdul Faoul; Second: Mehemet Faoul; Third: Layla El-Faouly
- Species: All: Human mutate (empowered by the Ruby Scarab)
- Abilities: Both: Superhuman strength and durability; Fire concussive bursts of mystical energy; Ability to sap the power from others on contact; Flight

Scarlet Scarab is the name of three characters appearing in American comic books published by Marvel Comics. Created by Roy Thomas, Archie Goodwin, and Frank Robbins, Abdul Faoul, the first Scarlet Scarab, made his first appearance in The Invaders #23 (December 1977). The second Scarlet Scarab, Mehemet Faoul, was created by Doug Moench and Alan Kupperberg, and made his debut in The Mighty Thor #326 (December 1982).

May Calamawy stars as Layla El-Faouly in the Marvel Cinematic Universe television series Moon Knight (2022), with the character becoming the Scarlet Scarab in its final episode while predating her being introduced in the comics as the third Scarlet Scarab.

== Development ==
=== Concept and creation ===
According to Roy Thomas, the Scarlet Scarab, like the Silver Scarab in Infinity, Inc., was an homage to the Dan Garret incarnation of the Blue Beetle "about whom I had written my second professional comics story back in 1965." The creators of the Ruby Scarab were named Garret and Dann.

=== Publication history ===
The first Scarlet Scarab first appeared in The Invaders #23 (December 1977), and was created by Roy Thomas, Archie Goodwin, and Frank Robbins. The character also appeared in The Invaders #25 (February 1978).

The second Scarlet Scarab first appeared in Thor #326 (December 1982), and was created by Doug Moench and Alan Kupperberg. He received an entry in the original The Official Handbook of the Marvel Universe #9.

A third Scarlet Scarab, based on the MCU incarnation, debuted in Moon Knight (vol. 9) #25 (September 2023) from writer Jed MacKay and art by Alessandro Cappuccio, Alessandro Vitti, and Partha Pratim. She appeared in the 2023 Moon Knight: City of the Dead series.

== Fictional character biography ==
=== Abdul Faoul ===
Abdul Faoul was a famous archaeologist during World War II. He unearthed the Ruby Scarab, an artifact that was originally created to battle the Elementals, around 3500 B.C. When Dr. Faoul touched the mystical power-object, he became the Scarlet Scarab and became a champion of Egypt during World War II.

Dr. Faoul worked as a liaison between the Allied Forces and the Egyptian government, and led the Human Torch and Namor to a recently excavated pyramid in search of the fanatic nationalist group, the Sons of the Scarab, which was actually led by Faoul. He tricked the heroes into opening the vault where the fist-sized ruby was kept. As the Scarlet Scarab, he first ousted the British, and then the Nazis, from Egypt. Scarlet Scarab continued to battle criminals after the war until the ruby simply disappeared in the 1950s, .

Dr. Faoul had not realized that the gem's crafter, a powerful pre-dynastic Egyptian sorcerer named Garret, had placed an enchantment on it that the ruby returns to Garret's tomb whenever it had used up its stored mystical power. Faoul searches for the ruby for twenty years, not realizing it had returned to where he had found it. Eventually, the Elementals sent N'Kantu, the Living Mummy to fetch the ruby. The ruby changed hands a number of times after N'Kantu recovered it, going from the Living Monolith, to a thief named Daniel "the Asp" Aspen, to the Elementals, and, finally, to an extra-dimensional traveler named Hecate. Meanwhile, Dr. Faoul continued searching until his death. As his dying act, he requested his son Mehemet to continue his quest.

=== Mehemet Faoul ===
Mehemet received from his father the strongbox he had used to store the Ruby Scarab. Inside was the costume he had worn as the Scarlet Scarab, a journal of his exploits, and a photo of the ruby. Mehemet considered it his duty to continue his father's quest, searching for years as his father had. Finally, Mehemet came to the gem's final resting place. Holding the ruby, he gained the powers of the Scarlet Scarab, and decided to become the new champion of Egypt. One of his goals was to protect the priceless ancient artifacts of Egypt. In one mission to recover some stolen artifacts, the Scarlet Scarab encountered Thor, who mistook his intentions and the two fought to a standstill.

=== Layla El-Faouly ===
Layla was the daughter of a famous scholar who grew up and became a mercenary who made numerous criminal connections. She joined the Karnak Cowboys consisting of Marc Spector, Jean-Paul Duchamp, and Dr. Robert Plesko. Layla and Marc would fall in love, gaining a reputation for arguing like a bickering couple. During a mission against Hydra, Layla lost her life, turning Marc down the path that would turn him into Moon Knight. Years later, Marc as Moon Knight would journey into the Duat to the save the life a young boy named Khalil, where he encountered Layla who following her death, was judged by the Goddess Taweret. Finding that her heart evened out on her scales, Taweret turned her into Duat's champion the Scarlet Scarab. Layla and Marc teamed up to rescue Khalil from the Legion of the Unliving and Marc's brother Randall who had been transformed into the Jackal Knight. Following the heroes' victory, Marc returned to the land of the living with Khalil and shared one last kiss with Layla. Unbeknownst to him however, Layla also materialized on Earth, promising to see Marc again soon.

== Powers and abilities ==
Abdul and Mehemet have superhuman strength and durability, the ability to fly at high speeds, the ability to fire concussive bursts of mystical energy, and the ability to drain the power from anyone who touches it. Abdul needed to maintain contact with the Scarab to use its power.

== In other media ==
=== Marvel Cinematic Universe ===
- An original version of Scarlet Scarab, Layla El-Faouly, appears in the Marvel Cinematic Universe series Moon Knight, portrayed by May Calamawy. This version is an archaeologist, adventurer, and Marc Spector's wife, as well as the daughter of an archaeologist who was murdered by one of Spector's associates. El-Faouly's backstory is based on Marlene Alraune, Spector's wife in the comics, who was changed from white to Egyptian at the suggestion of director Mohamed Diab. El-Faouly becomes the Scarlet Scarab in the sixth episode, "Gods and Monsters", after choosing to act as a temporary avatar of the deity Taweret. Diab noted he had not connected her to that character from the comics, explaining, "Sometimes Marvel picks a name and then gives it to the character that is developed." He pointed out that at the moment, she did not receive her powers from the scarab, but ultimately felt what the character represented was more important than her name. The character was later adapted into the comics.
- In 2022, Funko released a Layla El-Faouly / Scarlet Scarab Funko Pop figure inspired by the MCU incarnation of the character.
