= Natthaweeranuch Thongmee =

Thai actress (born 1979)

- ณัฐฐาวีรนุช ทองมี
- Born: 28 October 1979 (age 46); Bangkok, Thailand
- Other name: Ja (จ๋า)
- Education: Bachelor of Political Science, Chulalongkorn University; Master in European studies, Chulalongkorn University; Doctor of Political Sciences, Ramkhamhaeng University
- Occupations: Actress; model; VJ; MC
- Known for: Shutter; Noodle Boxer; The Whistle; I Miss U
- Height: 1.65 m (5 ft 5 in)
- Spouse: Thananan Ua-Arak (m. 2020)

Natthaweeranuch Thongmee (Thai: ณัฐฐาวีรนุช ทองมี; RTGS: Natthawiranut Thongmi; born 28 October 1979, in Thailand) nickname Ja (Thai: จ๋า; RTGS: Cha), is a model, actress, VJ for Channel V Thailand. She is best known for her appearance as the female lead in the 2004 horror film Shutter.

== Education ==
She graduated Bachelor of Political Science from Chulalongkorn University, Master in European studies from Chulalongkorn University. She graduated with a doctor of Political Sciences from Ramkhamhaeng University.

== Career ==
Her public acting career began when she appeared in her first film, Koo tae Patihan. She rose to fame with her appearance in Shutter, the successful 2004 horror film that launched a 2008 Hollywood remake.

== Filmography ==
- 2003 Koo tae Patihan / The Whistle (Thai: คู่แท้ ปาฏิหาริย์)
- 2004 Shutter (Thai: ชัตเตอร์ กดติดวิญญาณ)
- 2006 Noodle Boxer (Thai: แสบสนิท ศิษย์ส่ายหน้า)
- 2012 I Miss U (Thai: รักฉัน อย่าคิดถึงฉัน)

== Television ==
- 2018 Mon Tra Lai Hong
