= The Lazarus Effect (2015 film) =

2015 film by David Gelb

- Theatrical release poster
- Directed by: David Gelb
- Written by: Luke Dawson; Jeremy Slater
- Produced by: Jason Blum; Jimmy Miller; Cody Zwieg; Matt Kaplan
- Starring: Mark Duplass; Olivia Wilde; Donald Glover; Evan Peters; Sarah Bolger
- Cinematography: Michael Fimognari
- Edited by: Michael N. Knue
- Music by: Sarah Schachner
- Production companies: Blumhouse Productions; Mosaic
- Distributed by: Relativity Media (United States); Lionsgate (International)
- Release date: February 27, 2015
- Running time: 83 minutes
- Country: United States
- Language: English
- Budget: $3.3 million
- Box office: $38.4 million

The Lazarus Effect is a 2015 American science fantasy horror film directed by David Gelb and written by Luke Dawson and Jeremy Slater. The film stars Mark Duplass, Olivia Wilde, Donald Glover, Evan Peters, and Sarah Bolger.

The Lazarus Effect was released on February 27, 2015, by Relativity Media. It received generally negative reviews from critics but was a box office success, grossing $38.4 million worldwide against a budget of $3 million.

== Plot ==
At a university, medical researchers Dr. Frank Walton and his fiancée, Dr. Zoe McConnell, developed a serum, code-named "Lazarus". Although intended to assist coma patients, the serum can bring the dead back to life. Videography student Eva documents their project.

Assisted by their colleagues Niko and Clay, they run a successful trial on a recently euthanized dog, Rocky. However, the revived Rocky displays several unusual psychological and physical phenomena: cataracts formerly present in his eyes abruptly dissolve, he loses his appetite, and he displays increased aggression. Tests reveal that the serum, instead of dissipating, is concentrated within Rocky's brain and causes new synapses to be constructed.

The university dean learns of their underground experiments and shuts down their project. In addition, a major pharmaceutical company has bought out the company that funded their research and confiscated everything associated with the project.

Desperate to prove their ownership of the serum formula, Frank and his team sneak into their lab to replicate the experiment using a bag of the serum they kept. During their attempt, however, Zoe is fatally electrocuted. Despite the others' warnings, Frank uses the serum on her. Initially, the revival is a success, but the team soon realizes that something is wrong with Zoe. She claims that when she died, she went to her version of Hell, which was a nightmare originating from her childhood: during a fire in her apartment building, she witnessed trapped neighbors burning to death. She also demonstrates unusual psychic abilities.

The audience realize that the serum causes brains to "evolve" rapidly, giving Zoe superhuman abilities such as telekinesis and telepathy. It also causes increased aggression and insanity. Zoe eventually finds Eva and shows her the nightmarish Hell she experienced. It is revealed that Zoe was the one causing the fire in the building, and she went to Hell when she died. Zoe kills Rocky and then attempts to seduce Niko. When he refuses, she telekinetically throws him into a locker and crushes it, killing him. Zoe cuts the power to the entire lab. When Clay demands to know where Niko is, she kills him by lodging an e-cigarette into his throat. Later, Zoe kills Frank after he attempts to inject her with poison. Zoe then injects herself with the rest of the bag of the serum, strengthening her abilities.

Eva, who is still alive and trying to locate Zoe to inject her, is left alone in the dark. Zoe eventually finds Eva, who is apparently able to escape and inject Zoe with the syringe, but it turns out to be an illusion; Zoe then kills Eva. Zoe then injects Frank with her own serum-saturated blood, successfully bringing him back from the dead.

== Cast ==
- Mark Duplass as Dr. Frank Walton
- Olivia Wilde as Dr. Zoe McConnell
- Sarah Bolger as Eva
- Evan Peters as Clay
- Donald Glover as Niko
- Ray Wise as Mr. Wallace
- Amy Aquino as President Dailey

== Release ==
On December 17, 2013, it was announced that the film (then titled Lazarus) would be released on January 30, 2015, with Lionsgate distributing the film. On November 4, 2014, Relativity Media acquired U.S. distribution rights to the film from Lionsgate, which retained international distribution and sales rights, and set the film's release date for February 20, 2015. In December 2014, it was then announced that the film would be retitled The Lazarus Effect, and be released a week later than previously planned, on February 27, 2015.

=== Marketing ===
The first still of the film was released on January 5, 2015, along with the theatrical poster.

=== Box office ===
In North America, the film opened to number five in its first weekend, with $10,203,437, behind Focus, Kingsman: The Secret Service, The SpongeBob Movie: Sponge Out of Water, and Fifty Shades of Grey.

== Reception ==
The Lazarus Effect was generally negatively received by critics. On Rotten Tomatoes, 13% of 107 reviews were positive, with an average rating of 4/10. The site's consensus reads "The Lazarus Effect has a talented cast and the glimmer of an interesting idea, but wastes it all on insipid characters and dull, recycled plot points." On Metacritic, the film has a weighted average score of 31 out of 100, based on 29 critics, indicating "generally unfavorable reviews". Audiences polled by CinemaScore gave the film a grade of "C−" on an A+ to F scale.

Frank Scheck of The Hollywood Reporter gave the film a negative review, saying "The film squanders whatever potential it had, not to mention the talents of such performers as Duplass and Wilde who clearly deserve better." Geoff Berkshire of Variety also gave the film a negative review, saying "Mark Duplass and Olivia Wilde struggle to breathe life into a recycled thriller about the horrors of reanimation." In a negative review, Peter Keough of The Boston Globe said "There are lessons to be learned from this minimalist thriller. The first is that scaring people requires more than just tossing furniture around, turning the lights off and on, and basically sneaking up from behind and shouting 'Boo!'". Mick LaSalle of the San Francisco Chronicle gave the film one out of four stars, saying "This is an 83-minute movie that feels a half hour longer and, if it weren't for the loud crescendos, it would put people to sleep." Michael O'Sullivan of The Washington Post also gave the film one out of four stars, saying "It staggers, zombielike, from one jump-scare to another before petering out, a scant 83 minutes after rising from the slab." A.A. Dowd of The A.V. Club gave the film a C−, saying "Like too many horror films, this one seems targeted at a hypothetical audience using only 10 percent of its brainpower." Keith Staskiewicz of Entertainment Weekly also gave the film a C−, saying "I would have loved to see more from the filmmakers, daring to fail while staking out some new terror incognita instead of just going through the motions of an experiment for which we already have the results." Joe Neumaier of the New York Daily News gave the film two out of five stars, saying "The Lazarus Effect, clocking in at a brief 86 minutes, doesn’t go far enough, isn’t scary enough and has mad scientists who just aren’t mad enough. You watch it hoping it revives itself, but that dream is dead and buried."

Bruce Demara of the Toronto Star gave the film two out of four stars, saying "While The Lazarus Effect isn't the worst scary movie film you'll see this year, it is probably one of the most predictable and lazily plotted." James Berardinelli of ReelViews also gave the film two out of four stars, saying "The Lazarus Effect begins with an intriguing premise then proceeds to squander all the early goodwill through a slow, inexorable descent into cheap horror gimmicks." Writing for the St. Louis Post-Dispatch, Kevin C. Johnson gave the film two out of four stars and wrote "The Lazarus Effect boasts nothing special. It's not going to provide much relief for horror-starved audiences."

Claudia Puig of USA Today gave the film two and a half stars out of four, saying "Absorbing, well-crafted and appropriately tense, with a smart cast that raises it a notch above average." James Rocchi of The Wrap gave the film four out of five stars, saying "The Lazarus Effect doesn't exactly break new ground, but it nonetheless finds plenty to relish in the mouldering bits it stitches together as it gives classic themes about death, life and the soul a literal and figurative shot in the arm."
