= Delete (TV series) =

- Genre: Science fiction thriller
- Screenplay by: Jirassaya Wongsutin; Tossaphon Riantong; Parkpoom Wongpoom
- Directed by: Parkpoom Wongpoom
- Starring: Nat Kitcharit; Sarika Sathsilpsupa; Natara Nopparatayapon
- Composer: Jaithep Raroengjai
- Country of origin: Thailand
- Original language: Thai
- No. of series: 1
- No. of episodes: 8

Production
- Producer: Parkpoom Wongpoom
- Cinematography: Naruphol Chokanapitak
- Editors: Chonlasit Upanigkit; Supawit Buaket; Weerapat Tembundit
- Running time: 40–54 minutes
- Production companies: GDH 559; JORKANG Films

Original release
- Network: Netflix
- Release: June 28, 2023

Delete (stylized as DELETE) is a 2023 science fiction thriller television series directed by Parkpoom Wongpoom. It premiered worldwide on Netflix on 28 June 2023.

== Plot ==
Aim and Lilly are involved in an extramarital affair and wish to leave their unhappy relationships behind. After discovering a mysterious mobile phone capable of making people disappear simply by photographing them, they begin using its supernatural power to reshape their lives. However, the consequences of their actions soon spiral beyond their control.

== Cast ==
=== Main ===
- Natara Nopparatayapon as Too
- Nat Kitcharit as Aim
- Sarika Sathsilpsupa as Lilly

=== Support ===
- Chutimon Chuengcharoensukying as Orn
- Jinjett Wattanasin as Tong
- Wasita Hermenau as June
- Nopachai Jayanama as Yutthachai
- Sompob Benjathikul as Too's father
- Supawan Poolcharoen as Claire
- Duangjai Hiransri as Yutthachai's wife
- Porntip Kitdamrongchai as Ploysai
- Dujdao Vadhanapakorn as Dollapha
- Pattarasuda Anuman Rajadhon as Nicha (Nurse)
- Chertsak Pratumsrisakhon as Chart
- Chonchana Saichanhom as Sorn
- Chindarat Kasuya as Orn's mother
- Teerathorn Tarawongpitak as Young Too
- Chalisa Schaub as Too's mother
- Yasaka Chaisorn as Stableman

== Episodes ==
| No. | Title | Original release date |
|---|---|---|
| 1 | "DELETE: LOVE" (ลบความรัก) | June 28, 2023 |
| 2 | "DELETE: TRUST" (ลบความเชื่อใจ) | June 28, 2023 |
| 3 | "DELETE: FALSENESS" (ลบความผิด) | June 28, 2023 |
| 4 | "DELETE: HATRED" (ลบความเกลียดชัง) | June 28, 2023 |
| 5 | "DELETE: TRUTH" (ลบความจริง) | June 28, 2023 |
| 6 | "DELETE: PAIN" (ลบความเจ็บปวด) | June 28, 2023 |
| 7 | "DELETE: RAGE" (ลบความแค้น) | June 28, 2023 |
| 8 | "DELETE: SECRETS" (ลบความลับ) | June 28, 2023 |

== Awards and nominations ==
| Year | Award | Category | Recipient(s) | Result | Ref. |
|---|---|---|---|---|---|
| 2024 | Asian Television Awards | Best Drama Series (ASEAN) | DELETE | Won | |
| 2024 | Asian Television Awards | Best Direction (Drama, ASEAN) | Parkpoom Wongpoom | Won | |
