= May Calamawy =

Egyptian-Palestinian actress

- مي القلماوي
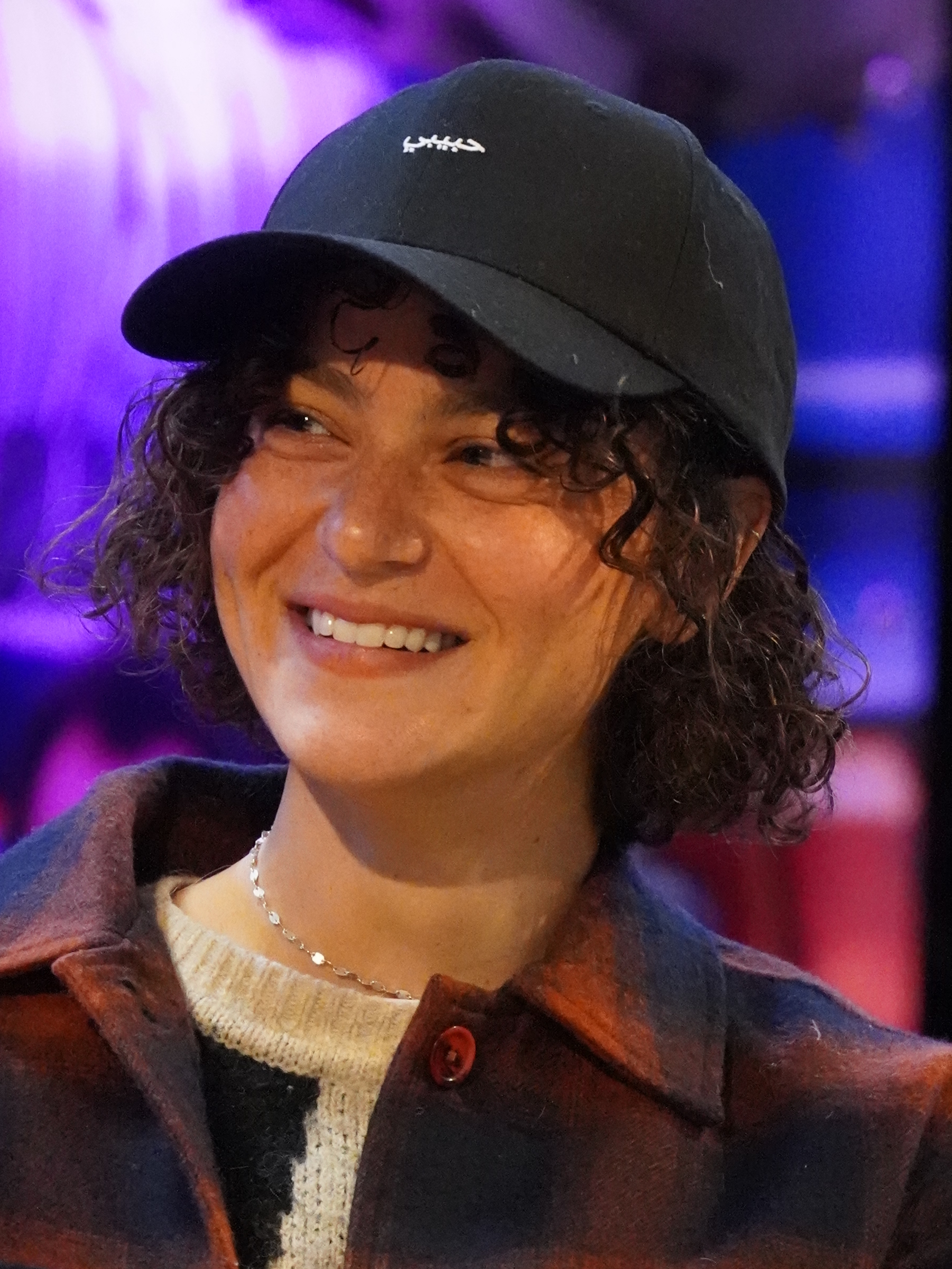
- Calamawy in 2025
- Born: May El Calamawy; October 28, 1986 (age 39); Bahrain
- Citizenship: Egypt; Palestine
- Education: Emerson College (BA)
- Occupation: Actress
- Years active: 2006–present

May El Calamawy (Arabic: مي القلماوي, romanized: Mayy al-Qalamāwī: Egyptian Arabic: [ˈmˤɑjj (el)ʔælæˈmæːwi]; born October 28, 1986) is an Egyptian-Palestinian (Note: Although Calamawy was born in Bahrain, she does not hold Bahraini citizenship. Bahrain's nationality law only grants citizenship to people born in Bahrain to a Bahrain-born father who is a permanent resident, while Calamawy's father is Egyptian and her mother is Palestinian-Jordanian. Calamawy identifies herself as Egyptian-Palestinian. All the reliable sources available refer to her as being only Egyptian-Palestinian, and as of September 2026, there is no evidence that she holds any other citizenship.) actress. Calamawy gained recognition for her portrayal of Layla El-Faouly / Scarlet Scarab in the Marvel Studios miniseries Moon Knight (2022), marking the first Egyptian and Arab superhero in the Marvel Cinematic Universe.

Born in Bahrain to an Egyptian father and a Palestinian-Jordanian mother, Calamawy was raised across Bahrain, Qatar, and the United States. She earned a Bachelor of Arts in theatre studies from Emerson College and later trained at the William Esper Studio in New York. Calamawy began her acting career in independent cinema, making her feature film debut in Thursday (2006), followed by a series of short films, followed by roles in the Hulu comedy-drama Ramy (2019–2022), Together Together (2021), The Actor (2025) and Lee Cronin's The Mummy (2026).

== Early life ==
May El Calamawy was born in Bahrain on October 28, 1986, to an Egyptian father who worked as a banker and a Palestinian-Jordanian mother. She has an older brother. Raised mostly in Bahrain, she also spent six years living between Doha, Qatar, and Houston, Texas, before she was twelve years old. Calamawy speaks English and Arabic and also plays the piano.

Calamawy has stated that she was inspired to become an actress after watching the film Death Becomes Her (1992) when she was a child. She completed high school in Bahrain, and at 17 she moved to Boston, Massachusetts, to study industrial design at her father's request, because he wanted her to study something other than acting. At first, her parents did not feel comfortable about sending her to the United States to study acting, because they wanted a degree that was more specialized and would guarantee a career. She applied to Emerson College and told her parents, "If I get in, I'm going." She was accepted and earned a B.A. in theatre studies. Calamawy's mother started accepting the idea of her acting career after college and became her main champion.

She moved to Dubai in 2009 to help care for her mother, who was sick with stage 4 lung cancer. Her hair started falling out due to stress at the same time as her mother's hair fell out due to chemotherapy. Following her mother's death when Calamawy was 25, her father suggested her to focus on a more stable job, which she tried for two years. From 2013 to 2014, she was the manager of the coffee shop The Magazine Shop in Dubai. Her mother's death inspired her to focus on acting. After living in Dubai for five years, she moved back to the United States in 2015 to pursue an acting career and enrolled at the William Esper Studio in New York City.

== Career ==
Calamawy started her career acting in short films and used to be credited with her full name, May El Calamawy. She later shortened her stage name to May Calamawy. After attending college, she participated in the New York Arab American Comedy Festival.

In 2006, she made her feature film debut in Thursday, directed by Thadd Williams. From 2009 to 2014, she was dividing her time between Dubai and Abu Dhabi, acting in shorts and a TV pilot. Her first major film role was in Tobe Hooper's 2013 supernatural horror film Djinn, the first horror film to be produced in the United Arab Emirates.

In 2017, she had a recurring role in the National Geographic miniseries The Long Road Home, and guest-starring roles in The Brave and Madam Secretary. The following year, she guest-starred in the CBS crime drama television series FBI. In October 2018, it was announced that she would have a recurring role in the Hulu comedy-drama series Ramy, playing Ramy's sister, Dena Hassan. In 2020, she voiced Ellie Malik in the video game NBA 2K21. In 2021, she appeared in the comedy film Together Together, with Ed Helms and Patti Harrison.

In 2022, Calamawy starred in the Disney+ miniseries Moon Knight, based on the Marvel Comics featuring the character of the same name, where she portrayed Layla El-Faouly, an Egyptian archeologist and estranged wife of Marc Spector (portrayed by Oscar Isaac), who later becomes the Scarlet Scarab, the first Egyptian and first Arab superhero in the Marvel Cinematic Universe. Her character made her comic debut in September 2023 as the new Scarlet Scarab on Moon Knight Vol. 9 #25. In July 2022, she joined the voice cast of the animated television series Moon Girl and Devil Dinosaur as a guest star. The show premiered on Disney Channel and Disney+ in 2023.

In May 2023, Calamawy joined the cast of Ridley Scott's Gladiator II and it was originally announced that she would play an important character, but her scenes were cut and she only appeared in an uncredited non-speaking background role as a companion of Denzel Washington's character in a few scenes.

In 2025, Calamawy played five different characters in Duke Johnson's thriller The Actor.

In 2026, she portrayed Detective Dalia Zaki in Lee Cronin's supernatural horror film The Mummy.

=== Upcoming projects ===
In August 2025, Calamawy joined the cast of the upcoming Netflix series Mercenary: An Extraction Series, as executive Priscilla Ragab. In May 2026, she joined the cast of Reid Carolin's film Isle of Man.

== Personal life ==
In 2015, Calamawy moved to the United States where she lived until the 2020s. As of 2026, she lives in London, England.

She was diagnosed with the autoimmune disease alopecia areata at the age of 22. Her alopecia was incorporated into the storyline of her character Dena Hassan in Ramy during the show's second season.

In October 2023, she signed an open letter for the Artists4Ceasefire campaign calling for a ceasefire in the Gaza Strip during the Gaza war.

== Filmography ==
Key
†	Denotes films that have not yet been released

=== Feature films ===
Year	Title	Role	Notes	Ref.
2006	Thursday	Kelly Spencer		
2013	Djinn	Aisha		
2021	Together Together	Carly		
2024	Gladiator II	Macrinus's companion	Uncredited non-speaking background role; reduced due to deleted scenes	
2025	The Actor	May / Benny's Girl / Mattie / Rita / Karen / Lady		
2026	Lee Cronin's The Mummy	Detective Dalia Zaki		
2027	Isle of Man †		Filming	

=== Short films ===
Year	Title	Role	Ref.
2007	Temperance	Leila	
2008	Santa Claus in Baghdad	Hala	
2011	Hassad Al Möta	Tunnel Zombie	
2011	Paradise Falls	Jenny	
2012	A Genie Called Gin	Lucy	
2013	Moi aussi je t'aime		
2017	Passerby	Saba	
2019	The Bed	Woman	
2019	Saeed	Sue	
2019	1 Out of 30	Fatimah	
2021	Meet Cute	Girl	
2025	Night Feeds	The Mother	
TBA	The Closet †	Annie	

=== Television ===
Year	Title	Role	Notes
2011	Checking In	Raya	Episode: "Sneak Peek"
2017	Madam Secretary	Mona Alsnany	Episode: "Off The Record"
2017	The Brave	Mina Bayoud	Episode: "It's All Personal"
2017	The Long Road Home	Faiza	Miniseries
2017	BKPI	Ameena	Episode: "Mister Flasher"
2018	FBI	Nita Kayali	Episode: "Green Birds"
2019–2022	Ramy	Dena Hassan	Main role
2022	Moon Knight	Layla El-Faouly / Scarlet Scarab	Miniseries; main role
2022	Marvel Studios: Assembled	Herself	Episode: "Assembled: The Making of Moon Knight"
2023	Moon Girl and Devil Dinosaur	Fawzia	Voice; episode: "Goodnight, Moon Girl"
TBA	Mercenary: An Extraction Series †	Priscilla Ragab	Series

=== Video games ===
Year	Title	Role	Notes
2020	NBA 2K21	Ellie Malik	Voice
