= Luke Dawson =

American screenwriter

Luke Dawson is an American screenwriter who is best known for his scripts of the remake of Shutter and the Thriller film The Lazarus Effect.

== Screenwriting ==
In 1998, he worked as a benefactor for the film Pi. He wrote the screenplay of Steven Sebring short drama film New York Stories and 2008 the screenplay of US remake Shutter. In 2014, he co-wrote the screenplay of The Lazarus Effect, along with Jeremy Slater, which received good ratings from film festivals and critics. He wrote the scripts of the action films Apt. and Executive Assistant Iris, which will be released early 2016. His other feature film screenwriting projects have included Afro Samurai, Lone Wolf And Cub and Adrift which he co-wrote with Darren Aronofsky, starring Jared Leto.

== Filmography ==
Benefactor

- Pi (1998)

Producer

- The Lazarus Effect (2015)

Screenplay:

- New York Stories (2003)
- Shutter (2008)
- The Lazarus Effect (2015)
- Apt. (2015)
- Executive Assistant Iris (2015)
- Adrift (TBA)
