= Moon Knight (miniseries) =

2022 Marvel Studios television miniseries

- Genre: Action-adventure; Fantasy; Psychological horror; Superhero
- Created by: Jeremy Slater
- Based on: Marvel Comics
- Directed by: Mohamed Diab; Justin Benson; Aaron Moorhead
- Starring: Oscar Isaac; May Calamawy; Karim El Hakim; F. Murray Abraham; Ethan Hawke; Ann Akinjirin; David Ganly; Khalid Abdalla; Gaspard Ulliel; Antonia Salib; Fernanda Andrade; Rey Lucas; Sofia Danu; Saba Mubarak
- Composer: Hesham Nazih
- Country of origin: United States
- Original language: English
- No. of seasons: 1
- No. of episodes: 6

Production
- Executive producers: Kevin Feige; Louis D'Esposito; Victoria Alonso; Brad Winderbaum; Grant Curtis; Oscar Isaac; Mohamed Diab; Jeremy Slater
- Production locations: Hungary; Jordan; Slovenia; Atlanta, Georgia
- Cinematography: Gregory Middleton; Andrew Droz Palermo
- Editors: Cedric Nairn-Smith; Joan Sobel; Ahmed Hafez
- Running time: 45–53 minutes
- Production company: Marvel Studios
- Budget: $147.9 million

Original release
- Network: Disney+
- Release: March 30 – May 4, 2022

Related
- Marvel Cinematic Universe television series

Moon Knight is an American television miniseries created by Jeremy Slater for the streaming service Disney+, based on Marvel Comics featuring the character of the same name. It is the sixth television series in the Marvel Cinematic Universe (MCU) to be produced by Marvel Studios, sharing continuity with the films of the franchise. It follows Marc Spector and Steven Grant, two alters of a man with dissociative identity disorder (DID), as they are drawn into a mystery involving Egyptian gods. Slater serves as head writer with Mohamed Diab leading the directing team.

Oscar Isaac stars as Marc Spector / Moon Knight and Steven Grant / Mr. Knight, with May Calamawy, Karim El Hakim, F. Murray Abraham, Ethan Hawke, Ann Akinjirin, David Ganly, Khalid Abdalla, Gaspard Ulliel, Antonia Salib, Fernanda Andrade, Rey Lucas, Sofia Danu, and Saba Mubarak also starring. The series was announced in August 2019, with Slater hired in November. Diab was hired to direct four episodes in October 2020, with directing duo Justin Benson and Aaron Moorhead joining in January 2021 to direct the other two. Isaac was confirmed to star at the time; he used different accents to differentiate Spector's various identities. Filming took place from April to October 2021, primarily in Budapest as well as in Jordan, Slovenia, and Atlanta, Georgia.

Moon Knight premiered on March 30, 2022, and ran for six episodes, concluding on May 4. It is part of Phase Four of the MCU. The series received positive reviews, with particular praise for the performances (particularly those of Isaac, Calamawy, and Hawke), the darker tone compared to previous MCU series, and its portrayal of DID.

== Premise ==
Marc Spector, a mercenary who has dissociative identity disorder (DID), is drawn into a deadly mystery involving Egyptian gods with his multiple alters, such as Steven Grant.

== Cast and characters ==
- Oscar Isaac as Marc Spector / Moon Knight, Steven Grant / Mr. Knight, and Jake Lockley:
  A man with dissociative identity disorder (DID), whose identities are distinct characters, and were differentiated in the script by their attitudes. Isaac chose to take this further by giving them different accents. He enjoyed being able to do "something really fucking nutty" with his portrayal, including exploring Spector's complex mind. Embodying each of the personas was a technical challenge for Isaac that required a lot of energy. Initially, Isaac would film all the material for one character and then switch to the other. Once he got more comfortable and "a handle" on both, it was easier for him to switch between the two, sometimes in the same moment. His brother Michael Benjamin Hernandez served as his body double, allowing Isaac to act against someone for scenes where both Marc and Steven meet. To prepare for the role, Isaac read Robert B. Oxnam's book A Fractured Mind, which he called his "bible".
  - Marc Spector is a Jewish-American mercenary who becomes the avatar for the Egyptian moon god Khonshu. Isaac used his own American accent for Spector, and "leaned into this Chicago guy who's pushing people away" for his portrayal of Spector, calling him a jerk. Executive producer Kevin Feige described Spector as a "brutal" action hero, and said the series would not pull back from portraying the violence of the character. Carlos Sanchez and David Jake Rodriguez portray Spector as a child and teenager, respectively.
  - Steven Grant is a mild-mannered British gift shop employee who becomes Mr. Knight, Grant's persona when he is Khonshu's avatar. Isaac put on a London English accent for Grant that he suggested was intentionally "bizarre" and unconvincing. He was inspired by the accents of the Jewish community living in Enfield, London, as well as the comedy style of English comedic performers such as presenter/actor Karl Pilkington from the British travel comedy series An Idiot Abroad (2010–2012), and Peter Sellers. Isaac added that Grant does not have great social skills and is "longing for connection". Grant has tension with Spector when the two personalities first become aware of each other. Mr. Knight uses Grant's knowledge of ancient Egypt to help get out of conflicts with wits and puzzle-solving, which is a contrast to Spector's Moon Knight persona.
  - Jake Lockley is a third, more ruthless alter. Lockley speaks in Spanish, with Isaac enjoying being able to bring that element of his own life to the role instead of just "trying to pay service to some idea that was in the comics". Isaac noted Lockley has something "ominous about him" and more control than Spector or Grant. Head writer Jeremy Slater believed it was unclear if Lockley had good intentions or not, only that he has a secret arrangement with Khonshu that Spector and Grant are unaware of, and seems to be "much more on board" with his mission.
- May Calamawy as Layla El-Faouly / Scarlet Scarab:
  An archeologist and adventurer, who is Spector's wife and is aware he is Moon Knight. Lead director Mohamed Diab and his wife Sarah Goher were "huge champions" of the character since she was how the series was representing Egypt. Calamawy described her character as someone with "a lot of healing to do", who "step[s] into herself more" and "develops more confidence and trust in herself" through supporting Spector. She drew inspiration from Middle Eastern women, who "have a very unassuming, soft strength to them", as opposed to Western actresses, such as Angelina Jolie who had portrayed the tomb-raiding Lara Croft. Calamawy called El-Faouly a street fighter, and wanted her stunts to reflect that by having them be reactionary and not choreographed or clean. In the final episode, El-Faouly becomes the MCU version of Scarlet Scarab, the temporary avatar of the Egyptian goddess Taweret; this name was revealed by Marvel.com following the series' finale. Diab pointed out that at the moment, she did not receive her powers from the scarab, but ultimately felt what the character represented was more important than her name.
- Karim El Hakim and F. Murray Abraham as Khonshu:
  The Egyptian moon god, an outcast among the gods for waging a "one-god war on perceived injustices", thus necessitating him to find and use his avatar, Marc Spector. Slater called him an "imperious and sort of snotty and vengeful" deity, who is prone to temper tantrums and is dealing with his own insecurities, adding he was more interested in a version of the character that had "his own moral failings and weaknesses" rather than one who was "always right and impervious to mistakes". Abraham called Khonshu "outrageous" and "capable of doing anything and charming his way out of it". As well, Abraham believed Khonshu was unselfish and willing to sacrifice himself the same way he demands sacrifice from others. El Hakim provided the on-set performance of Khonshu while Abraham provides his voice.
- Ethan Hawke as Arthur Harrow:
  A religious zealot and cult leader associated with the Egyptian goddess Ammit looking to exact justice and judgment based on future crimes. Harrow was Khonshu's previous avatar before Spector. Hawke worked in tandem with Isaac to conceive Harrow as an opposite to Spector, wanting to perform inverse actions or emotions to him, and saw Harrow as a mix between a monk and a doctor. He was inspired for his performance by cult leader David Koresh, Cuban president Fidel Castro, the Dalai Lama, Pentecostal televangelist Jimmy Swaggart, writer Leo Tolstoy, fictional character Nurse Ratched from One Flew Over the Cuckoo's Nest (1975), and Nazi officer and doctor Josef Mengele, as well as questioning what if Apple Inc. co-founder Steve Jobs was a "bad guy". Psychiatrist Carl Jung was also an inspiration, particularly when Hawke portrays the psychiatric doctor version of Harrow.
- Ann Akinjirin as Bobbi Kennedy: A police officer and follower of Harrow's cult.
- David Ganly as Billy Fitzgerald: A police officer and follower of Harrow's cult.
- Khalid Abdalla as Selim: The avatar of Osiris and leader of the Ennead council.
- Gaspard Ulliel as Anton Mogart: A wealthy antiquities collector living in Egypt and an old acquaintance of Layla's.
- Antonia Salib as Taweret: The hippopotamus-headed Egyptian goddess of childbirth and fertility, who guides souls through the Duat. Salib provides the voice and motion capture performance for the character.
- Fernanda Andrade as Wendy Spector: Marc's mother and Elias' wife.
- Rey Lucas as Elias Spector: Marc's father and Wendy's husband.
- Sofia Danu and Saba Mubarak as Ammit:
  The imprisoned Egyptian goddess of judgement whom Harrow plans to release to cast her preemptive judgement on all of humanity. Danu provides the on-set performance, while Mubarak voices the character.

Shaun Scott recurs in the series as the living statue Crawley. Also guest starring are Lucy Thackeray and Alexander Cobb as Grant's co-workers Donna and J.B., respectively, Díana Bermudez as Yatzil, the avatar of the Egyptian goddess of love Hathor, Declan Hannigan as the avatar of the Egyptian god of kinship Horus, Hayley Konadu as the avatar of the Egyptian goddess of moisture Tefnut, Nagisa Morimoto as the avatar of the Egyptian goddess of magic Isis, Loic Mabanza as Mogart's bodyguard Bek, Joseph Millson as Dr. Steven Grant from the fictional film Tomb Buster, while Bill Bekele portrays his young assistant Rosser, Claudio Fabian Contreras as Spector's younger brother Randall, and Usama Soliman as Layla's father Abdallah El-Faouly.

== Episodes ==
No.	Title	Directed by	Written by	Original release date
1	"The Goldfish Problem"	Mohamed Diab	Jeremy Slater	March 30, 2022
Steven Grant works at the National Art Gallery in London, where he hopes to become a tour guide using his knowledge of Ancient Egypt. After going to sleep one night, he wakes up in the Austrian Alps and witnesses a cult meeting led by Arthur Harrow, who demands a scarab Grant unknowingly has in his possession. As he attempts to escape, he has several blackouts and hears a mysterious voice in his head before waking up in his home. Grant realizes that two days have passed since he went to sleep. He finds a hidden phone and keycard in his apartment and receives a call from the most frequent number in the phone's call log, a woman named Layla who addresses him as Marc. The next day at work, Grant is confronted by Harrow, who reveals that he is a servant of the Egyptian goddess Ammit. Grant escapes from Harrow but is forced to remain at work that night on his own to make up for being late. Harrow summons a jackal-like creature to attack Grant, but his "reflection" asks to take control of their body. Grant agrees, transforming into a cloaked warrior who kills the jackal.
2	"Summon the Suit"	Aaron Moorhead & Justin Benson	Michael Kastelein	April 6, 2022
Grant is blamed for the damage caused by the jackal creature, due to it not appearing on the museum's security cameras, and is fired. He uses the keycard to access a storage locker where he finds the scarab. He speaks with his "reflection", another person in Grant's body that introduces himself as American mercenary Marc Spector, the current avatar of the Egyptian moon god Khonshu. Grant is confronted by Layla, Spector's wife, who is unaware of Grant's existence, before being arrested by police officers working for Harrow. Harrow reveals that he was Khonshu's previous avatar until he chose instead to follow Ammit. He explains that he wants to use the scarab to find Ammit's tomb and resurrect her so she can purge humanity of evil by wiping out everyone who has committed or will commit evil deeds. Layla rescues Grant, but Harrow summons another jackal creature. Grant manages to summon a suit of his own to fight the jackal, but is overpowered and allows Spector to take control. Spector kills the jackal but loses the scarab to Harrow. Khonshu threatens to claim Layla as his next avatar if Spector fails to stop Harrow.
3	"The Friendly Type"	Mohamed Diab	Beau DeMayo and Peter Cameron & Sabir Pirzada	April 13, 2022
Harrow and his followers discover the location of Ammit's tomb in the Egyptian desert. In Cairo, Spector and Grant both experience blackouts while tracking a lead to Harrow's location. After failing to gain information, Khonshu calls a council between his fellow Egyptian gods and their avatars to warn them of Harrow's plans, but Harrow successfully denies the accusation. Hathor's avatar, Yatzil, tells Spector to find the sarcophagus of a medjay who knew of the location of Ammit's tomb. Layla finds Spector and takes him to meet with Anton Mogart, an acquaintance who owns the sarcophagus. Harrow arrives and destroys it, forcing Spector, Grant, and Layla to fight off Mogart's men and escape into the desert. Grant assembles some of the sarcophagus fragments into a star map, but it is two thousand years out of date. Khonshu uses his powers to briefly turn back the night sky to the correct night, allowing Grant and Layla to find Ammit's tomb. The other gods imprison Khonshu in an ushabti for this, leaving Grant and Spector's body without Khonshu's powers.
4	"The Tomb"	Justin Benson & Aaron Moorhead	Alex Meenehan and Peter Cameron & Sabir Pirzada	April 20, 2022
Grant and Layla find a deserted campsite at the location of Ammit's tomb, which is a maze in the shape of the Eye of Horus. They discover that some of Harrow's men have been killed by undead Egyptian priests, who then attack Grant and Layla. Layla defeats the priests but encounters Harrow, who claims that Spector was one of the mercenaries who murdered her archaeologist father, Abdallah El-Faouly. Grant finds the tomb and discovers that Ammit's last avatar was Alexander the Great; he retrieves Ammit's ushabti from inside Alexander's body. Layla angrily confronts Spector, who reveals that his partner killed Layla's father and Spector himself before Khonshu revived Spector as his avatar. Harrow arrives and shoots Spector, who wakes up in a psychiatric hospital populated by people from his life. After escaping from Harrow, who appears as a therapist at the hospital, Spector finds Grant in a separate body trapped in a sarcophagus. They also see a second sarcophagus with someone else trapped inside before being greeted by a female hippopotamus-headed figure.
5	"Asylum"	Mohamed Diab	Rebecca Kirsch and Matthew Orton	April 27, 2022
The hippopotamus-headed woman is the Egyptian goddess Taweret, who explains that Spector and Grant are dead and the "psychiatric hospital" is a boat sailing through the Duat, the Egyptian afterlife. She weighs their hearts on the Scales of Justice to determine whether they can enter the Field of Reeds, but the hearts are imbalanced by hidden memories that she suggests they explore together. Grant sees a memory of Spector's younger brother Randall drowning and Spector's mother blaming him for it, while Spector shows Grant how he became Khonshu's avatar while on a mission with his partner Bushman, who murdered Layla's father. Spector and Grant convince Taweret to help them return to the living world so they can stop Harrow, and she steers the boat towards the Gates of Osiris. Spector reluctantly explains that he unknowingly created Grant as a result of their mother's abuse. Grant and Spector reconcile with each other, but their scales fail to balance and hostile spirits attack them, dragging Grant into the Duat where he turns to sand. The scales balance and Spector finds himself in the Field of Reeds.
6	"Gods and Monsters"	Mohamed Diab	Teleplay by : Jeremy Slater and Peter Cameron & Sabir Pirzada; Story by : Danielle Iman & Jeremy Slater	May 4, 2022
Harrow kills the avatars of the other Egyptian gods and frees Ammit. Layla finds Khonshu's ushabti and releases him. Spector refuses to stay in the Field of Reeds and returns to the Duat to rescue Grant. With Taweret's help, they escape through the Gates of Osiris and awaken in their body. Khonshu re-bonds with them, restoring their powers. Layla discovers that Ammit can be re-bound by multiple avatars and agrees to become the temporary avatar of Taweret. They join Spector, Grant, and Khonshu in fighting Harrow and Ammit. Harrow overpowers Spector and Grant, but they experience a blackout during which time they somehow defeat Harrow. Spector and Layla seal Ammit in Harrow's body, imprisoning her, and Khonshu urges Spector to execute Harrow and Ammit. Spector refuses and orders Khonshu to release him and Grant from their service. The pair find themselves in the "hospital", where they reject the vision and choose to continue their new life protecting the world. In a mid-credits scene, Harrow and Ammit are killed by Jake Lockley, Spector's third alter, who is still working with Khonshu.

== Production ==
=== Development ===
The character Marc Spector / Moon Knight was to be introduced in the planned second season of Blade: The Series before its cancellation in September 2006. A potential spin-off series for the character had also been in development. In October, Marvel Studios partnered with No Equal Entertainment to produce a separate television series featuring Moon Knight. Writer Jon Cooksey was hired to develop the series by 2008, but it did not move forward. James Gunn, the writer and director of Marvel's Guardians of the Galaxy films, said in January 2017 that he had discussed a Moon Knight film with Marvel Studios but did not have time to work on it; he later said that he had mentioned the idea in passing to Marvel Studios president Kevin Feige and several others, but did not have a full pitch for such a film as had been reported on from what he initially stated. Feige confirmed in April 2018 that Moon Knight would be introduced to the Marvel Cinematic Universe (MCU), but questioned, "Does that mean five years from now, 10 years from now, 15 years from now?". That August, M. Raven Metzner, who served as showrunner for the second season of the Marvel Television series Iron Fist (2017–2018), revealed that there had been discussions about including Moon Knight in the season during its development.

In August 2019, Marvel Studios announced at the D23 conference that a series based on Moon Knight was being developed for the streaming service Disney+. That November, Jeremy Slater was hired to serve as the head writer and executive producer of the series, which consists of six 40–50-minute episodes. Egyptian director Mohamed Diab was set to direct four episodes in October 2020, as well as executive produce the series. Marvel had approached him "out of the blue" to present a pitch for Moon Knight, which includes Egyptian mythology and characters that the superhero is associated with in the comics. Diab and his writer-producer wife, Sarah Goher, put together a 200-page document outlining their vision for the series, which included their intention to depict Egypt and Egyptian people in a more positive way than they felt had been done in previous Hollywood productions. Diab elaborated that American films and series often used Orientalist stereotypes, such as portraying Egyptian people as exotic "guides and desert wanderers" or ignoring the fact that the Giza pyramids are beside Cairo, a modern city. He wanted to portray Egyptians as "normal human beings" and Egypt as a "normal place" like modern America, while also hiring other Egyptian crewmembers to work on the series. He added that the series would be "hard, serious and about big topics" like many of his previous feature films. Slater stated that following Diab's hiring, Marvel Studios decided to go "in a different direction", with Diab bringing on his own writers, diverging the series' story from what Slater and his writing team envisioned. By November 2020, director duo Justin Benson and Aaron Moorhead were asked to create a pitch for the series, after previously having had discussions with Marvel Studios about finding a project to work on together. They joined the series to direct the other two episodes in January 2021, working alongside Diab to ensure a consistent approach to the series. Marvel Studios' Feige, Louis D'Esposito, Victoria Alonso, Brad Winderbaum, and Grant Curtis also serve as executive producers along with star Oscar Isaac, with Goher as a consulting producer, and Nick Pepin as the production and development manager for the series. The budget for the series was $147.9 million.

In February 2021, Feige said some of Marvel's series, including Moon Knight and She-Hulk: Attorney at Law (2022), were being developed with the potential to have additional seasons made, in contrast to series like WandaVision (2021), which were developed as limited events that lead into feature films instead. A year later, Isaac referred to Moon Knight as a limited series, while Diab was unsure whether the series would continue.

=== Writing ===
Michael Kastelein, Beau DeMayo, Peter Cameron, Sabir Pirzada, Alex Meenehan, Rebecca Kirsch, Matthew Orton, and Danielle Iman serve as writers on the series, with an archeologist specializing in Egyptian tombs consulting with the writers. Feige likened the series to the Indiana Jones franchise while exploring Egyptology, two aspects that were a large part of Slater's pitch given that he wanted to tell a "dark, complex story" mixed with "big, fun, supernatural, Amblin-style magic". Slater said he wanted the series to have a similar tone to the films Raiders of the Lost Ark (1981) and Ghostbusters (1984), and bring some horror aspects and monsters to the MCU. He wanted to push the limits of how dark a Marvel series could be, which Feige and Marvel Studios were supportive of. The film The Mummy (1999) was also an inspiration. Feige said there was a clear difference in tone between Moon Knight and the other Marvel Studios Disney+ series released at that point, adding that the studio worked with Disney+ to push the boundaries on how much of Moon Knight's brutality they could present in the series.

Feige said title character's mental illness was a unique aspect of the series, which primarily focuses on his psychological trauma. Dr. Paul Puri, a board-certified psychiatrist and an assistant clinical professor at UCLA, served as a consultant for the series regarding its depictions of mental illness. Diab did caution that though the creatives were respectful of dissociative identity disorder (DID), the series still exists in a fictional, supernatural world and some elements were "over-dramatize[d]". He suggested using reflections to portray the conversation scenes between Grant and Spector, which became a recurring theme of Moon Knight. The series draws on the character's more modern interpretations in the comics regarding DID, such as each identity losing a sense of time when not in control. Each episode's end credits conclude with a message encouraging viewers to visit the website of the National Alliance on Mental Illness to learn more about DID. Jeff Lemire and Greg Smallwood's run in the comics served as primary inspiration for the series. The Bill Sienkiewicz and Warren Ellis runs on the character were also inspirations for their visuals and the introduction of the Mr. Knight persona, respectively. Executive producer Grant Curtis said the series explored identity and "finding one's true self", adding that Grant and Spector would look to "reconcile portions of [their] past, present and potential future that [they don't] necessarily agree with". Isaac believed the series would be "experiential" for viewers to connect with "the psychological horror of not knowing what's happening and the slow revelations of the truth" that came with portraying the character's DID. Slater added that the creatives took the series' depiction of mental health seriously, researching the disorder and aiming for Moon Knight to have a positive portrayal and message regarding mental health.

Slater said the series would not heavily feature the aspects of Moon Knight in the comics where he was a playboy philanthropist, since that version of the character had been likened to the DC Comics character Batman which was not a comparison that Slater wanted to make. Slater added that exploring Moon Knight's mental health allowed them to be more than "a palette-swapped Batman clone", adding that he was "his own greatest enemy in a lot of ways". He instead chose to pull from the character's "monster-hunting past" from the comics. Isaac believed Moon Knight was "the first legitimate Marvel character-study" since the first MCU film Iron Man (2008), with Curtis adding that the character was like Stark for Marvel Studios in that he could be "built from the ground up". Steven Grant is the focus of the series in the early episodes opposed to Spector, who is the main alter from the comics. When researching past comics for the series, Slater found that he always enjoyed Moon Knight, but did not like Spector since he was "not necessarily the easiest character to love". He was able to more easily approach a character archetype like Grant and "how to make [the audience] fall in love with that character", so he refocused the series to be "a sort of weird buddy show" where Spector could serve as Grant's protector to ensure he had a happy ending. Early in development, Grant was the identity who became Moon Knight, while Spector would have become Mr. Knight, but these were eventually reversed. The existence of the third alter, Jake Lockley, is hinted at throughout the series before appearing in the final episode's mid-credits scene. Slater noted that all of the creatives worked to find the proper balance of how many overt hints to leave regarding Lockley, deciding to focus on viewers unfamiliar with the character from the comics and creating a satisfying mystery for them. Each of the directors worked with their cinematographers to find moments in the earlier episodes that could be "confusion" where Lockley could enter and exit. For example, when Grant returns in the first episode from the cupcake truck chase, a shot of a mirror features barely a third reflection.

During the series' development, Marvel Studios was interested in including the character Maya Lopez / Echo in one of their projects. Because the character is a love interest of Spector's in the comics, Slater and the writers considered using Lopez that way in the series as well. However, she did not fit the story they were trying to tell and Marvel Studios eventually decided to use the character in their Hawkeye (2021) miniseries instead. This decision was supported by the Moon Knight creatives. Marlene Alraune, Spector's most prominent love interest in the comics, was also not included because she was deemed to be the "prototypical damsel in distress" seen in many older comics. Slater felt any lead female character needed to be more like Marion Ravenwood from Indiana Jones, someone who could "go toe to toe with the boys". This led to the creation of the character Layla El-Faouly, originally named Zayna Faoul, who has "one foot in her Egyptian heritage and one foot in the mercenary world". Diab pushed for the character to be Egyptian, with Slater adding that had she been a white character alongside Spector, also traditionally a white character in the comics, they would have encountered "white savior tropes and some of the weird imperialism and colonialism problems" that countries such as Egypt have dealt with. During development, it was decided to give the character superpowers and the creatives took the name of the first Egyptian hero from the comics, Scarlet Scarab, to give to her. Diab noted that he had not specifically connected El-Faouly to that character from the comics.

The antagonists for the series are Arthur Harrow and the Egyptian goddess Ammit, two lesser-known villains from Moon Knight's comics history. Slater said there was "[a] lot of trial and error" in choosing the villains, noting the most "logical" villain to use was, Bushman, Moon Knight's most famous villain, since he has a direct tie to the character's origins. However, when trying to include the character in the series, Slater only saw him as "a guy with a gun, which made him too dangerous to go up against Steven Grant" and to solve that, they would need to give him superpowers, and the writers considered making Bushman an avatar of another Egyptian god; this also proved challenging because Slater could not find "enough real estate" to make Bushman have "an actual emotional connection to the story" while also avoiding the racist tropes the character presented over the year, and because he felt too similar to Black Panther (2018) villain N'Jadaka / Erik "Killmonger" Stevens. A storyline was conceived where Spector and Bushman would have fought "beneath a pyramid in a bunch of old booby-trapped burial chambers". The writers then decided to create an original villain for the series through Harrow, tying him to Spector and Grant's past by having him be a former avatar of Khonshu, and despite being a similarly named, but different, character in the comics, chose the name "Arthur Harrow" because "it sounded cool". Commentators also believed Harrow included elements of other Moon Knight characters such as the Sun King and Morning Star.

The supernatural elements inspired from the comics include various Egyptian gods, one of whom, Khonshu, manipulates Spector in a way that draws on their "toxic" relationship from the comics. The series is set in the MCU in early 2025, but has no explicit connections to other parts of the MCU, with some planned references to the actions of Gorr the God Butcher from the film Thor: Love and Thunder (2022) removed during the writing process. Slater said this was done because they did not naturally fit the series, and because it was unclear during development when the series would be released in relation to that film. This is also why its place in the MCU timeline was left vague. There were also discussions regarding including Dane Whitman, with Steven Grant working at the same museum as him, but Slater stated there was "never any logical reason for him to be in the show" as it would not have progressed his Black Knight storyline. The Eternals Kingo and Makkari from the film Eternals (2021) were also planned to appear during a flashback sequence showing the fall of Ammit and the death of Alexander the Great. The creatives also considered the budgetary implications of adding other stars to the series, deciding it was better spent for the series' visual effects and other areas of production. Diab added that they found the story to be "so psychologically complicated" and intriguing that they did not need the "crutches" of MCU references. Isaac said Moon Knight's "most important thing was an emotional truth to the journey that was happening" rather than its MCU plot ties. It is partially set in London, rather than New York City like the comics, to differentiate the series from the other MCU projects set in that city.

=== Casting ===
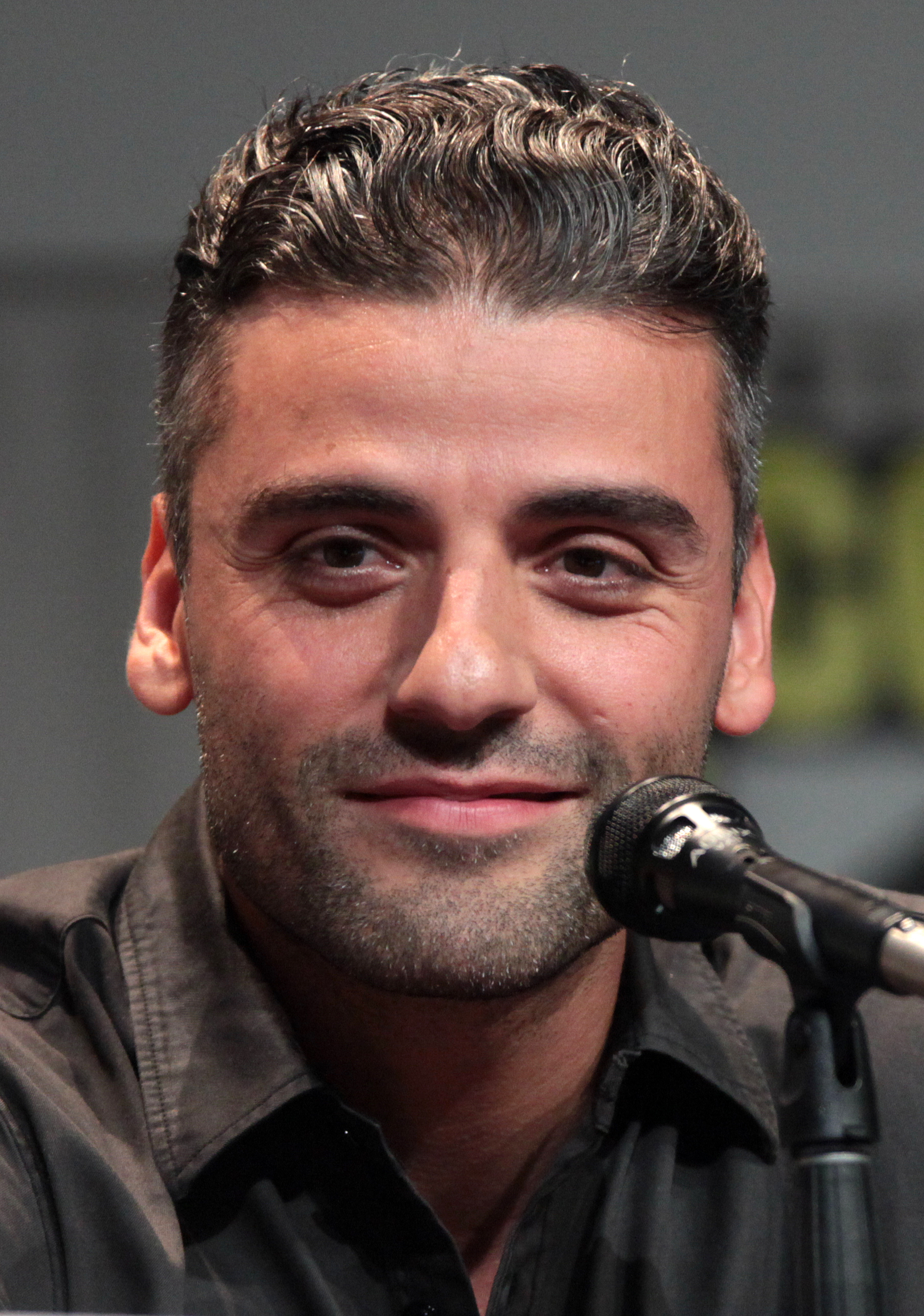
Oscar Isaac stars as Marc Spector in the series

In October 2020, Oscar Isaac entered negotiations for the lead role, and was said to have been cast in January 2021; Marvel Studios officially confirmed the casting that May. Isaac was initially hesitant to join the series, as he was wary of being in another franchise after experiencing how much time and effort was required to film the Star Wars sequel trilogy. He accepted the role after researching DID further and becoming fascinated with Grant's characterization for the series, as well as being given creative freedom from Feige. Richard Newby of The Hollywood Reporter felt Isaac's recent major acting roles could draw audiences unfamiliar with the character to the series, and that his Latino ethnicity could allow an examination of faith from different perspectives, rather than having the character be depicted as a Caucasian Jewish man like in the comics. Isaac later confirmed that the character would be portrayed as Jewish-American in the series.

In January 2021, May Calamawy was cast in the "key role" of Layla El-Faouly, and Ethan Hawke was cast as Arthur Harrow, the series' main villain. Goher had approached Calamawy on social media to convince her to audition, and had included Calamawy in her and Diab's pitch presentation for the series. Isaac had initially approached Hawke about joining the series, and Diab asked Hawke not to read the scripts before signing on because he wanted to develop the character with the actor. Diab was thankful that Hawke trusted him and Isaac enough to join them without seeing the scripts, which Hawke said he had not done in 35 years. He explained that he joined the series because of Isaac, Diab, and where he felt he was in his acting career, and he enjoyed the creative freedom that came with the series telling a lesser-known story. Gaspard Ulliel joined the cast by July 2021 as Anton Mogart, in one of his last roles before his death in January 2022. F. Murray Abraham was revealed to be voicing Khonshu in February 2022, having been approached for the role; Karim El Hakim provided the on-set performance of the character. Ann Akinjirin and David Ganly also star as police officers and Harrow's followers Bobbi Kennedy and Billy Fitzgerald, respectively, while Khalid Abdalla stars as Osiris' avatar Selim, and Antonia Salib stars as the Egyptian goddess Taweret. Sofia Danu and Saba Mubarak were the on-set performer and voice of the Egyptian goddess Ammit, respectively.

Lucy Thackeray was revealed to be portraying Donna in the series' trailer, released in January 2022. Additional castings were revealed ahead of the series' premiere in March, including Rey Lucas as Marc's and Steven's father Elias Spector, Fernanda Andrade as Wendy Spector, Marc's mother, Saffron Hocking as Dylan, Shaun Scott as Crawley, and Díana Bermudez as Yatzil. Other guest stars included Alexander Cobb as J.B., Declan Hannigan as the avatar of Horus, Hayley Konadu as the avatar of Tefnut, Nagisa Morimoto as the avatar of Isis, Loic Mabanza as Bek, Joseph Millson as Dr. Steven Grant, Bill Bekele as Rosser, Claudio Fabian Contreras as Spector's younger brother Randall, and Usama Soliman as Layla's father Abdallah El-Faouly. The majority of smaller Egyptian roles went to Egyptian actors, including those living in Budapest, such as Ahmed Dash, Hazem Ehab, Amr Elkady, and Zizi Dagher.

=== Design ===
==== Sets ====
Stefania Cella serves as the production designer, working with Egyptologists and an Egyptian supervising art director to ensure historical accuracy in her sets. She meticulously worked on details to bring realism to the sets. Her Chamber of the Gods set was three stories tall and decorated with yellow hieroglyphs related to divinity. The Burial Chamber set featured hieroglyphs and water and reflective surfaces to represent the series's themes of duality and identity. Grant's attic apartment was constructed to resemble the pyramids, while Harrow's residence was made to be commune-style in the Spitalfields/dockyard part of London. The Mogart's Mansion set included two Louvre-inspired glass pyramids that were built for filming. Two Egyptian housing block sets were also built. The hospital in the Duat was designed based on the combination of the iconography of hospitals and Harrow's private space in the second episode. The same set was used, with its set dressings for the commune removed and then painted white as Cella thought it the best way to represent Spector's perception of reality was by using the same location and instead making it a part of the hospital in Spector's consciousness. She used the color white because she felt it was associated with "hygiene and operation and gowns" and also thought that it "is the color of, 'Am I there or I'm not there?' Because it sometimes is the white space and then it's paradise", which she thought helped contribute to the story.

==== Costumes ====
Meghan Kasperlik serves as the costume designer. Diab wanted the costumes to have a lot of Egyptian symbols and iconography, with Kasperlik finding ways to include "those subtleties but still representing Egyptian culture today and also Ancient Egyptians symbols from the past". She also worked with Cella to ensure the same symbols on the sets were incorporated into the costumes.

Grant's costumes were meant to evoke the "coolness" of Brixton but with some elements "off", with Kasperlik finding vintage shirts in New York for the character, and later incorporating a "clunkier shoe to weigh this character down" and a Chore coat. Spector has a "desert look with a tactical, utilitarian and lighter costume". He also has a hoodie and vest with multiple functions which was foreshadowing for Moon Knight's cape effect. Arthur Harrow's costumes are "monk-like" inspired by real-life cult leaders, while El-Faouly has a more athletic look with Cairo and London influences. Harrow has Ammit's death prayer inscribed on his bracelet, while El-Faouly's Egyptian touches are subtlety featured in her jewelry. El-Faouly also has teases throughout the series hinting at her becoming the Scarlet Scarab, such as her pants being the same print as when she is in the Scarlet Scarab suit. Most of El-Faouly's costumes were custom-made, despite their contemporary appearance.

Oscar Isaac as Moon Knight (L) and Mr. Knight (R). Both the Moon Knight and the Mr. Knight costumes contained Khonshu's symbol, with Moon Knight's design based on the Universe X version of the character from the comics, while Mr. Knight's adapted the similar three-piece suit from the comics.

Moon Knight's costume consists of armor and Ancient Egyptian bandages, with hieroglyphic-like symbols on his cape, which feature Khonshu's oath and are in a repeating pattern on the underlining in a foil-like fabric. The moon crest on his chest, from which he spawns his crescent darts, also contains the oath of Khonshu, while additional hieroglyphs on his pants state "Rise and live again as my fist of vengeance. My Moon Knight." His mummy bandage design is based on the Universe X version of the character from the comics, and was designed to conjure around Spector, giving it a supernatural quality and helping to differentiate it from similarly forming hero suits in the MCU that use nanotech. Feige suggested taking the bandage design and combining it with the character's more modern design in the comics. She ultimately chose to separate the costume into many layers and not turn it into a molded piece with the piece and texture on top, as she wanted to incorporate symbolism of Khonshu into her design. The Moon Knight suit was created by FBFX in London, and consisted of over 803 different pieces. It was created out of a flexible "Euro jersey" material, and featured 3D printed textures and colors to give it depth and texture.

For Mr. Knight, Kasperlik created a three-piece suit based on his design in the comics, with various homages to Khonshu in the design. She added designed sneakers to modernize the look. The buttons on his waistcoat feature Khonshu's symbols. She also wanted to pick a fabric that would not be flat white, would have a texture, and would not get "blown out" during nighttime filming and look like "a white marshmallow running across the screen", choosing a white-on-white textured fabric with a silver lame in it. The logic behind the designs of the Moon Knight and Mr. Knight suits was inspired by who each identity was, what they love, and their imagination. With Grant "completely away from the superhero world", he summons a costume that resembles a suit as Mr. Knight. Both the Moon Knight and Mr. Knight suits contained Khonshu's symbol.

Khonshu, Taweret, and Ammit's costumes were made for each character, despite each being CGI characters. To create Khonshu's costume, Kasperlik read previous comics and researched various types of fabrics and how she could make it tattered. She used six different types of fabrics that were all hand-sewn and stretched so the actor could wear it comfortably. A custom leather collar and leather strips were added over the chest area to emphasize his symbol, while a belt, which was sculpted and molded, also goes around his waist. The practical costume pieces for Taweret consisted of a scarab, breastplate, gold bracelets, "several layers of feathers that plumed out", and hieroglyphs carved into various elements, with Salib calling Taweret "a very fashionable goddess". Salib also wore platform shoes to mimic hippo feet as well as a motion capture pole to aid in the extra height of the character. Given Taweret is the goddess of childbirth and fertility, her headpiece features the birthing dance and prayer of ancient Egypt, which was a replica of a piece of Egyptian artwork. Much of her costume was constructed by in-house leather works and metalsmiths. Both Khonshu and Taweret had their prayers and oaths incorporated into the various symbolisms on their costumes.

==== Titles ====
External videos
- Marvel Studios' Moon Knight: End Credits Main On End Title Sequence – Without Text presents the series' main-on-end title sequence with the text removed, YouTube video from Perception's channel

The series' main-on-end title sequence was designed by Perception. The company sought inspiration from ancient Egyptian artifacts at the Metropolitan Museum of Art, working with Curtis in crafting a sequence that focused on the series' dark and mysterious tone. Reflections serve as recurring imagery in the sequence, and Perception also included several Easter eggs referencing certain elements of the series. Each episode's end credits feature a new phase of the moon, starting with a crescent moon in the first episode.

=== Filming ===
Filming was expected to begin in March 2021, and was confirmed to be underway by the end of April in Hungary. The series was filmed under the working title Good Faith, with Diab directing the first, third, and final two episodes and Benson and Moorhead directing the second and fourth. Moorhead explained that he and Benson were "handed" the second and fourth episodes to direct, in part because of logistical reasons, but also because each of the episodes were designed to have "its own voice", though the first two episodes connect a little more closer to each other because the creatives were still "figuring out the production" then. He continued that the location of the fourth episode was "very much its own thing", allowing the duo to "cordon off a little bit", while the final two episodes are "their own voice from each other and from the rest of the episodes". Gregory Middleton was the cinematographer for Diab and Andrew Droz Palermo served the role for Benson and Moorhead. Soundstage work occurred at Origo Studios in Budapest. The series was previously expected to begin filming on November 16, 2020, to last for 26 weeks, but this was postponed due to the COVID-19 pandemic. Filming occurred at the Museum of Fine Arts in Budapest in April, which served as exteriors for London's fictional National Art Gallery, and in Szentendre at the beginning of May. In early June, outdoor night scenes were filmed at Madách Square in Budapest. Various exterior locations in Budapest were found to stand-in for London, particularly the Brixton and Soho areas.

Filming also occurred in Slovenia, for one week in Wadi Rum, Jordan, and concluded in Budapest and Jordan by the beginning of October, at which point production moved to Atlanta, Georgia. It had wrapped by October 14. Isaac said filming felt "handmade", with Diab bringing local authenticity and attention to the smallest details such as including the correct text of a prayer over a shop. Hawke was appreciative of the Egyptian Diab for leading the series, since he did not approach the series "with the eyes of an American", but as someone who had grown up in the country. The production had hoped to film the series in Egypt but were unable to in part because of the country's political climate and censorship issues; Hollywood production had not been able to shoot in the country for some time.

Additional photography was completed by mid-November, and Diab said there was much less reshooting required for the series than on other Marvel Studios projects, occurring over four days. He, Isaac, and Hawke attributed this to the large amount of rehearsing and discussing that they did before filming each episode, including regular Sunday brunches with the main cast and crew. Hawke said these meetings helped form a "collective imagination" for the series that made it easier to switch between Diab's episodes and those directed by Benson and Moorhead, since the "imaginative force behind it was the same".

=== Post-production ===
Abraham joined the series later in the process and had multiple recording sessions where he was encouraged to provide different takes and ideas for the material. He came up with various vocal options, ultimately settling on the one he enjoyed and was the best fit for the character. Cedric Nairn-Smith serves as an editor on the series for the first and sixth episodes, Joan Sobel for the second and fifth episodes, and Ahmed Hafez for the third and fourth episodes, while Sean Andrew Faden serves as the visual effects supervisor. Visual effects for the series were created by Framestore, Image Engine, Mammal Studios, WetaFX, and Zoic Studios. A large portion of Cairo was digitally created by Weta, who found the Giza pyramid complex particularly difficult to recreate.

=== Music ===
External audio
- Hesham Nazih – Moon Knight (From "Moon Knight"/Audio Only) presents composer Hesham Nazih's main theme for the series as heard on the first episode's soundtrack, YouTube audio-only video from MarvelMusicVevo's channel

Egyptian composer Hesham Nazih had composed the score for the series by early March 2022, in his first major English-language project. He used an orchestra of 62 musicians and 36 singers, which were recorded at Synchron Stage Vienna, while soloists playing Egyptian folk instruments such as the arghul, mizmar, and rebab were recorded in Cairo. Nazih felt the folk instruments had a "prominent presence and sonority" within the score and did not work against the "texture" of the classical orchestra. Diab was drawn to Nazih to score the series because his work "encompasses authentic Egyptian elements in a very contemporary way", with the music helping to break Egyptian stereotypes by revealing some of the country's lesser-known contemporary art to international audiences; Diab described it as a "beautiful score that is Egyptian, but it's international at its core, it's universal". Nazih's themes for Moon Knight and Harrow "chase[d] one another and sometimes collided".

The series' soundtrack used a mixture of older and newer songs as a way to showcase Cairo's music scene, which has similar sensibilities to the West, without resorting to songs that would feel like they were from the Middle Ages. Marvel Music and Hollywood Records released the first episode's end-credits track from Nazih, "Moon Knight", as a digital single on March 30, 2022, followed by the series' soundtrack album on April 27.

Moon Knight (Original Soundtrack)
No.	Title	Length
1.	"Moon Knight"	2:10
2.	"The Village"	1:36
3.	"Village Scales"	2:13
4.	"Phone and Elevator Blues"	2:09
5.	"Chaos Within"	3:37
6.	"Full Moon Fight"	2:13
7.	"Storage Locker"	2:36
8.	"What Suit?"	2:48
9.	"Moonlight Fight"	3:19
10.	"Fake Passport"	2:33
11.	"She Is Here"	4:37
12.	"The Sky"	2:34
13.	"The Boat"	2:05
14.	"Takes the Body"	3:06
15.	"Constellation"	4:16
16.	"No Suit"	3:29
17.	"The Kiss"	1:54
18.	"Eye of Horus"	1:11
19.	"Welcome Travelers"	1:42
20.	"Weight of Hearts"	2:33
21.	"The Cave"	2:56
22.	"All Your Fault"	1:55
23.	"Open the Door"	1:45
24.	"Give Her a Call"	3:12
25.	"The Inevitable"	5:15
26.	"Humble Disciple"	4:15
27.	"Befriending Myself"	3:32
28.	"Rise and Shine"	2:43
29.	"We Need More"	1:30
30.	"New Skillsets"	6:08
31.	"I'll Never Stop"	2:36
32.	"Meet My Friend"	0:37
33.	"Summon the Suit"	2:17
Total length:		85:22

== Marketing ==
The first footage of the series debuted on Disney+ Day on November 12, 2021. A trailer was then released on January 17, 2022, during the 2021–22 NFL playoffs, with James Whitbrook at Gizmodo noting that it gave a full look at the character following the brief Disney+ Day footage. He said the costume was faithful to the comic book version, "albeit more textured-looking". Daniel Chin from The Ringer highlighted the use of the song "Day 'n' Nite" by Kid Cudi, and felt that Moon Knight was "shaping up to be one of [Marvel's] darkest and most distinctive projects to date", due to its darker tone, incorporation of horror elements, depiction of violence, and how the series introduced a new character into the MCU rather than focus on previously established characters. Richard Newby at The Hollywood Reporter felt the trailer was "relish[ing]" in the general audience's lack of knowledge about the character by maintaining a sense of mystery. He also felt the series looked like it would be one of the darkest and most original projects from Marvel Studios, which was echoed by his colleagues Aaron Couch and Borys Kit, who said the trailer suggested "something unlike any other Marvel show". Isaac's British accent for the Steven Grant identity received mixed responses from viewers, and Isaac himself made fun of it in a video where he and Hawke reacted to the trailer. Isaac later said the accent was intentionally unconvincing. The trailer was viewed over 75 million times in 24 hours, which was better than trailers for Marvel Studios' other Disney+ series, except The Falcon and the Winter Soldier's Super Bowl LV trailer which had 125 million views. Additionally, its social engagement of 263,000 mentions were the highest of any Disney+ Marvel series for their first content release. An additional trailer aired during Super Bowl LVI on February 13, which continued to keep the series mysterious while depicting its "darker sensibilities", according to Screen Rant's Rachel Labonte. Ben F. Silverio of /Film said the shots of Moon Knight's cape "flung out into the shape of a crescent moon" and the character catching his moon-shaped weapons were the "coolest". RelishMix reported the trailer had 9.49 million views in 24 hours across Facebook, Twitter, YouTube, and Instagram.

The "Marvel Must Haves" merchandise program, which reveals new toys, games, books, apparel, home decor, and other merchandise related to each episode of Moon Knight following an episode's release, started for the episodes on April 1 and concluded on May 5, 2022. Also in April, Marvel and National Geographic released a featurette exploring how the series approached and researched all of the Ancient Egyptian iconography for the sets and story.

QR codes were included in the first two and final two episodes linking viewers to a website to access free digital comics featuring Moon Knight that updated weekly. The comics released for the six episodes, in order, were Werewolf by Night #32 and #33, Moon Knight vol. 1 #3, Universe X #6, Moon Knight vol. 1 #1, and Moon Knight Annual vol. 2 #1. Each had a connection to a character or visual reference that appeared in that week's episode. By the release of the finale, Disney announced the site was visited over 1.5 million times, with 500,000 full comics read. Adam B. Vary of Variety called the initiative "a savvy way to expand viewers' comic book knowledge" for the more obscure character of Moon Knight. Curtis explained that he had been fascinated with the engagement the animated series Bob's Burgers had with their gags in the opening and closing credits and their "burger of the week", and believed that interactivity could be brought to Moon Knight to "help educate viewers on Moon Knight's comic book history". When filming at the storage locker facility in "Summon the Suit", which already had existing QR codes on their doors, Curtis realized that would be the way to "organically incorporate QR codes into the environment". He had originally thought of another idea for the engagement that Marvel was unable to execute technologically. The visual effects team then inserted the live QR codes with CGI into the episodes where codes could naturally be found, which was why codes were not included in the third, fourth, and sixth episodes (outside of one in its post-credits scene) as they would "stick out as a gimmick" in those environments. Curtis was hopeful the project would continue for other MCU films and series. Viewers who scanned the code were also sent an exclusive, digital poster after the series finale of the "SPKTR" license plate.

== Release ==
=== Streaming ===
Moon Knight debuted on Disney+ on March 30, 2022. It consists of six episodes, released weekly until May 4. A special screening occurred on March 16 at Cine Capitol in Madrid, and on March 17 at the British Museum in London, with the red carpet premiere on March 22 at El Capitan Theatre in Los Angeles. It is part of Phase Four of the MCU.

=== Home media ===
Moon Knight was released on Ultra HD Blu-ray and Blu-ray by Walt Disney Studios Home Entertainment on April 30, 2024, with SteelBook packaging and concept art cards. Bonus features include the featurette "Egyptology"; deleted scenes; a gag reel; and the Marvel Studios: Assembled documentary special "The Making of Moon Knight".

Moon Knight ranked No. 4 on the Blu-ray chart for the week ending May 4, 2024. It had 59% of its sales coming from Blu-ray.

== Reception ==
=== Viewership ===
Whip Media, which tracks viewership data for the more than 21 million worldwide users of its TV Time app, calculated that Moon Knight was the most-anticipated new original series in the U.S. for the week ending May 1.Variety's Trending TV chart, which tracks social media engagement across trending television content, reported that Moon Knight generated 168,000 engagements on Twitter from March 14–20, 2022. The spike in engagement was driven by a new TV spot ahead of the show's March 30 debut, which teased a connection between Oscar Isaac's Marc Spector/Steven Grant and May Calamawy's character, Layla. Additional discussion was sparked by comments from director Mohamed Diab, who criticized the lack of Egyptian representation in DC's upcoming Black Adam film. Moon Knight ranked No. 3 on the chart, following Ms. Marvel and the Critics Choice Awards. Market research company Parrot Analytics, which looks at consumer engagement in consumer research, streaming, downloads, and on social media, reported that Moon Knight had the most in-demand United States series premiere in the first quarter of 2022. It had 33.4 times the average demand of all other series in the U.S. during its first 30 days.

Luminate, which measures streaming performance in the U.S. by analyzing viewership data, audience engagement metrics, and content reach across various platforms, reported that Moon Knight accounted for 11.7% of total original series viewership on Disney+ between December 31, 2021, and December 29, 2022. It was the platform's third most-streamed show in 2022, with 6 billion minutes viewed in the United States. Streaming analytics firm FlixPatrol, which monitors daily updated VOD charts and streaming ratings across the globe, reported that Moon Knight was the tenth most-streamed series globally on Disney+ in 2022. According to the file-sharing news website TorrentFreak, Moon Knight was the fourth most-watched pirated television series of 2022.

=== Critical response ===
Moon Knight: Critical reception by episode
Percentage of positive critics' reviews tracked by the website Rotten Tomatoes

The review aggregator website Rotten Tomatoes reported an 86% approval rating with an average rating of 7.65/10, based on 240 reviews. The website's critics consensus reads, "Its entertainment value may wax and wane a bit, but Moon Knight ultimately settles into a mostly enjoyable—and refreshingly weird—spot in the MCU firmament." Metacritic, which uses a weighted average, assigned a score of 69 out of 100 based on 27 critics, indicating "generally favorable reviews".

Matt Webb Mitovich at TVLine gave the series' first four episodes an "A−", saying it "subvert[s] and perhaps wildly exceed[s] any tempered expectations", enjoying the unpredictability the series brought compared to Marvel Studios' other Disney+ series centered on established characters. Mitovich also praised the visuals of Moon Knight and the acting, particularly that from Isaac. Variety's Daniel D'Addario praised the show's "high-stepping riskiness" and "freshness ... that's enticing even for those outside the fandom". Giving the first four episodes of the series four out of five stars, James Dyer wrote in his review for Empire that Moon Knight was "a boldly bonkers affair that manages to capture the same giddy joy imbued in Hawkeye and Loki", delivering "something that feels genuinely different from any corner of the MCU yet explored". He added, however, that "the larger narrative is at times less compelling than the quirky character work".

Daniel Fienberg of The Hollywood Reporter was more critical of the series, thinking the series was "more successful as an Oscar Isaac acting exercise than a superhero thrill-ride". Fienberg was frustrated by the lack of Moon Knight and clarity to his skill set and stated the series "feels intended less as a TV show and more as an explanation for why viewers would want to watch the character eventually" join up with other MCU characters. He did appreciate Diab's culturally-appropriate depictions of Egypt. Rolling Stone's Alan Sepinwall gave the series 3 out of 5 stars, enjoying Isaac's performance as both Grant and Spector, but feeling there was "precious little to feel excited about" in the series beyond that. Though Sepinwall became more engaged by the conclusion of the fourth episode since the story pivots "more into the darkness inherent in the character", he did not have high hopes for the series conclusion given past MCU Disney+ series faltered in their finales and the character's history of "being more exciting in theory than reality".

With the series' conclusion, Richard Newby also of The Hollywood Reporter, believed the series felt "the most unfinished in terms of completing the story setup" of any of the MCU properties and called the "lacking sense of narrative completion" puzzling. He continued that despite the uncertainty of additional seasons or if Isaac would return to the role, the final episode left viewers wanting more, especially with multiple story points still able to be explored further, and Newby wondered if Moon Knight would have been better served with more episodes to reach a more satisfying conclusion and give more depth to the character and his part of the MCU.

=== Accolades ===
Accolades received by Moon Knight
Award	Date(s) of ceremony	Category	Recipient(s)	Result	Ref.
MTV Movie & TV Awards	June 5, 2022	Best Hero	Oscar Isaac	Nominated	
Premios Juventud	July 21, 2022	Favorite Actor	Oscar Isaac	Nominated	
Hollywood Critics Association TV Awards	August 14, 2022	Best Actor in a Streaming Limited or Anthology Series or Movie	Oscar Isaac	Nominated	
Hollywood Critics Association TV Awards	August 14, 2022	Best Supporting Actor in a Streaming Limited or Anthology Series	Ethan Hawke	Nominated	
Hollywood Critics Association TV Awards	August 14, 2022	Best Writing in a Streaming Limited or Anthology Series	Jeremy Slater (for "The Goldfish Problem")	Nominated	
Primetime Creative Arts Emmy Awards	September 3–4, 2022	Outstanding Cinematography for a Limited or Anthology Series or Movie	Gregory Middleton (for "Asylum")	Nominated	
Primetime Creative Arts Emmy Awards	September 3–4, 2022	Outstanding Fantasy/Sci-Fi Costumes	Meghan Kasperlik, Martin Mandeville, Richard Davies, and Wilberth Gonzalez (for "Gods and Monsters")	Nominated	
Primetime Creative Arts Emmy Awards	September 3–4, 2022	Outstanding Music Composition for a Limited or Anthology Series, Movie or Special (Original Dramatic Score)	Hesham Nazih (for "Asylum")	Nominated	
Primetime Creative Arts Emmy Awards	September 3–4, 2022	Outstanding Character Voice-Over Performance	F. Murray Abraham (for "The Friendly Type")	Nominated	
Primetime Creative Arts Emmy Awards	September 3–4, 2022	Outstanding Sound Editing for a Limited or Anthology Series, Movie or Special	Bonnie Wild, Mac Smith, Kimberly Patrick, Vanessa Lapato, Matt Hartman, Teresa Eckton, Tim Farrell, Leo Marcil, Joel Raabe, Ian Chase, Anele Onyekwere, Stephanie Lowry, Carl Sealove, Dan O'Connell, and John Cucci (for "Gods and Monsters")	Won	
Primetime Creative Arts Emmy Awards	September 3–4, 2022	Outstanding Sound Mixing for a Limited or Anthology Series or Movie	Bonnie Wild, Scott R. Lewis, Tamás Csaba, and Scott Michael Smith (for "Gods and Monsters")	Nominated	
Primetime Creative Arts Emmy Awards	September 3–4, 2022	Outstanding Stunt Coordination for a Drama Series, Limited or Anthology Series or Movie	Olivier Schneider and Yves Girard	Nominated	
Primetime Creative Arts Emmy Awards	September 3–4, 2022	Outstanding Stunt Performance	Daren Nop, Jamel Blissat, Estelle Darnault, and Sara Leal (for "Gods and Monsters")	Nominated	
Saturn Awards	October 25, 2022	Best Limited Event Series (Streaming)	Moon Knight	Nominated	
Saturn Awards	October 25, 2022	Best Actor in a Streaming Series	Oscar Isaac	Won	
Saturn Awards	October 25, 2022	Best Supporting Actor in a Streaming Series	Ethan Hawke	Nominated	
People's Choice Awards	December 6, 2022	Male TV Star of 2022	Oscar Isaac	Nominated	
People's Choice Awards	December 6, 2022	Sci-Fi/Fantasy Show of 2022	Moon Knight	Nominated	
Critics' Choice Super Awards	March 16, 2023	Best Actor in a Superhero Series	Oscar Isaac	Nominated	
Critics' Choice Super Awards	March 16, 2023	Best Villain in a Series	Ethan Hawke	Nominated	

By April 2022, Marvel Studios and Disney planned to submit Moon Knight in the various limited series categories for the Primetime Emmy Awards, along with Hawkeye. However, by the final episode's release in May, a promotional tweet for the episode initially called it a "series finale", before being deleted and shared calling it a "season finale", despite no indication of any further seasons. Clayton Davis at Variety noted that this change could force the Academy of Television Arts & Sciences to reject Moon Knight in the limited series categories given their rules and use of past social media and interviews in determining eligibility, necessitating the studios to submit the series in the drama categories, along with Loki. Despite this, Davis noted Moon Knight was still planned to be submitted in the limited series categories, which Disney and Marvel ultimately did.

== Documentary special ==
In February 2021, the documentary series Marvel Studios: Assembled was announced. The specials go behind the scenes of the MCU films and television series with cast members and additional creatives. The special of this series, "The Making of Moon Knight", featured Isaac and was released on Disney+ on May 25, 2022. It was included as part of the series' home media release on April 30, 2024.

== Future ==
Feige stated in November 2019 that after introducing Moon Knight in the series, the character would cross over to the MCU films. Diab said in March 2022 that he believed Moon Knight would be part of the MCU for the next ten years and he hoped the character would eventually get his own feature film. At the time of the series' premiere, Isaac had not signed on to return for future projects, and by the finale, Diab and Curtis were unsure of the character's future, be it in a second season, feature film, or part of another character's project. Diab hoped a potential second season would be able to film in Egypt. Isaac was open to returning "if there was a story that really made sense", with Calamawy and Hawke also expressing interest in returning. In August 2022, Isaac said he was grateful for being able to explore the character and tell the story of this series without the burden of being locked in to future projects. He said there was an option to do more, but it was not "imperative". In October, Isaac said he had begun discussions with Marvel Studios about reprising his role.

In February 2025, Winderbaum expressed interest in a second season but said one was not planned, and Moon Knight would instead return in a different future project. In May 2026, Slater explained that Isaac's contract included a clause that he would only return for projects where he was creatively excited about the story, allowing the actor to be "really creatively involved in the future" of Moon Knight. Slater said he had not heard from Marvel Studios in the years since the series was made and he therefore did not expect to be involved in the character's next appearance.
