= Shutter (2004 film) =

2004 Thai horror film

- Theatrical release poster
- Directed by: Banjong Pisanthanakun; Parkpoom Wongpoom
- Written by: Banjong Pisanthanakun; Sopon Sukdapisit; Parkpoom Wongpoom
- Produced by: Yodphet Sudsawad
- Starring: Ananda Everingham; Natthaweeranuch Thongmee; Achita Sikamana
- Cinematography: Niramon Ross
- Edited by: Manop Boonvipat; Lee Chatametikool
- Music by: Chartchai Pongprapapan
- Production companies: GMM Pictures; Phenomena Motion Pictures
- Distributed by: GMM Tai Hub
- Release date: September 9, 2004
- Running time: 97 minutes
- Country: Thailand
- Language: Thai
- Box office: ฿109.98 million (Bangkok, Metropolitan & Chiang Mai)

Shutter (Thai: ชัตเตอร์ กดติดวิญญาณ Chattoe: Kot Tit Winyan, "Shutter: Press to Capture Ghosts") is a 2004 Thai supernatural horror film by Banjong Pisanthanakun and Parkpoom Wongpoom; starring Ananda Everingham, Natthaweeranuch Thongmee, and Achita Sikamana. It focuses on a photographer and his girlfriend who accidentally hit a woman with their car and begin to experience paranormal events starting with the appearance of mysterious white shadows in his photographs.

A box-office success, the film was remade multiple times. An American English-language remake was released in 2008 under the same name. The film was also unofficially remade thrice in India, in the languages Telugu as Photo, Tamil as Sivi and Hindi as Click. An official Indonesian remake with the same name was released in 2025.

== Plot ==
After a friends' party, Jane (Natthaweeranuch Thongmee) and her photographer boyfriend Tun (Ananda Everingham) get into a car accident, with Jane accidentally running over a woman. Tun prevents her from getting out of the car; they drive away, leaving the girl on the road.

Tun begins to discover mysterious white shadows and faces in his photographs. Jane thinks that these images may be the ghost of the girl they hit. Tun, who has been experiencing severe neck pains since the accident, visits a specialist and is dismayed to find that his weight is double his regular weight. He dismisses the idea of being haunted, though his friends are also being disturbed by this mysterious entity.

Jane discovers that the girl was Natre, a shy young woman who had attended Tun's college. Tun admits that he and Natre were in a relationship, which Tun had kept secret from his friends. Natre loved Tun and threatened to kill herself when he broke off the relationship. Tun witnesses his friend, Tonn, commit suicide, and discovers that his two other close friends from college have also committed suicide. Believing that they have been coerced into doing so by Natre's ghost, Tun becomes convinced he will be next.

Tun and Jane visit Natre's mother and discover Natre's decaying body in the bedroom. Natre had killed herself, but her mother could not bear to have her cremated. They convince her mother to have a proper funeral for her, after which Jane hopes that everything will return to normal. They spend the night at a hotel, where Tun is confronted by Natre's ghost. While trying to get away, he falls off a fire escape and is injured.

On returning to Bangkok, Jane collects some photographs. One of the films shows a series of images of Natre crawling towards the bookcase in Tun's apartment. Behind the bookcase, Jane finds a set of negatives. She develops them to find photographs in which Tun's friends – the ones who committed suicide – are sexually assaulting Natre. Disgusted by her findings and now convinced that Natre tried to warn her, a teary Jane confronts Tun. He admits to have witnessed the rape but did nothing to stop his friends, and that he was the one who had taken those photos. He says he did it out of peer pressure and has never forgiven himself but Jane leaves him.

Knowing that he is still haunted by Natre, Tun begins taking pictures of every room in the house, but does not see her. He throws the camera in a rage, only for it to go off and take a photograph of Tun, showing Natre sitting on his shoulders and revealing the true cause for his neck pain and increased body weight. Natre covers his eyes, making him lose balance and fall out of the window.

Sometime later, Jane visits Tun in hospital. He sits slumped over, seemingly unaware of her. The reflection on glass shows Natre still sitting on his shoulders.

== Cast ==
- Ananda Everingham as Tun
- Natthaweeranuch Thongmee as Jane
- Achita Sikamana as Natre
- Unnop Chanpaibool as Tonn
- Titikarn Tongprasearth as Jim
- Sivagorn Muttamara as Meng
- Chachchaya Chalernphol as Tonn's wife

== Release ==
=== Home media ===
Umbrella Entertainment released the 4K UHD Blu-ray version of the film on 7 May 2025.

== Reception ==
=== Critical response ===
On the review aggregator website Rotten Tomatoes, 63% of 24 critics' reviews are positive, with an average rating of 5.50/10.

Asian Movie Pulse praised the film as a remarkable work that planted the flag of Thai horror films on the world film map.

=== Public response ===
The film opened at #1 at the Thai box office, grossing $867,800, and remained at the top in its second weekend, grossing $607,300. The film grossed a total of $2,584,600 in Thailand, becoming the fifth-highest-grossing film of the year.

The film was nominated for the 2005 Golden Kinnaree Award for best film at the Bangkok International Film Festival and has won various awards at smaller festivals.

== Remakes ==
The film was remade thrice in the Indian languages Telugu as Photo (2006), Tamil as Sivi (2007) and Hindi as Click (2010). An English-language remake was released in 2008 under the same title. An Indonesian remake of the film was released in 2025.

== See also ==
- List of ghost films
- Spirit photography – Attempt to capture images of ghosts or spirits
