= Jeremy Slater =

American screenwriter (born 1978)

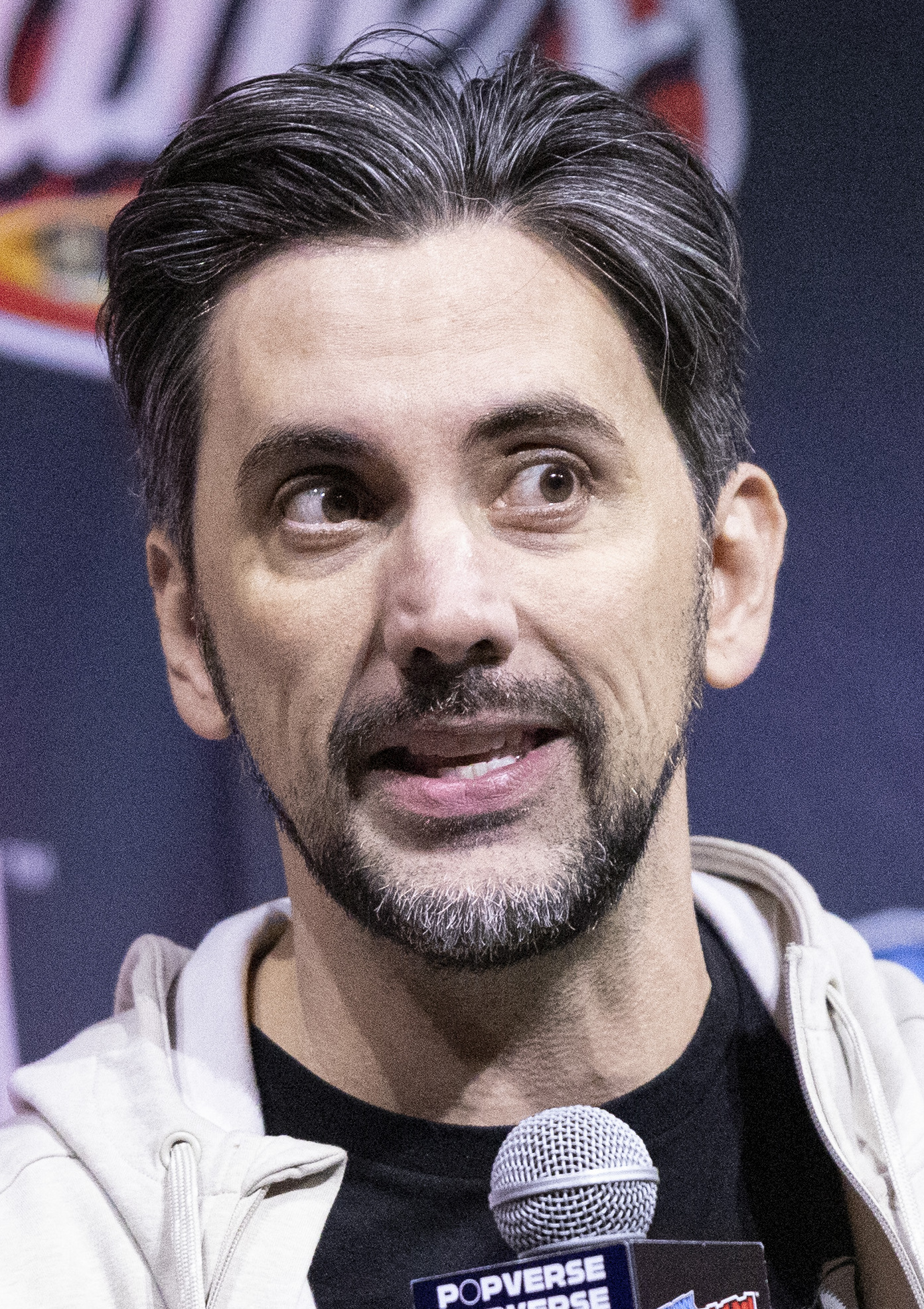
- Slater at the 2025 New York Comic Con
- Born: October 12, 1978 (age 47)
- Education: University of Notre Dame
- Occupations: Producer, writer
- Years active: 2015–present

Jeremy Slater (born October 12, 1978) is an American writer and producer of film and television, known for his work on films such as Fantastic Four, Death Note, Godzilla x Kong: The New Empire, Mortal Kombat II, and Coyote vs. Acme, and on television series such as The Umbrella Academy and The Exorcist, which Slater created, and on which he served as executive producer. He is the head writer and executive producer for the Disney+ miniseries Moon Knight.

== Career ==
In July 2012, Slater was hired to write the script for the 2015 Fantastic Four film. After the film was released in August 2015, Slater commented that a lot of what he wrote was not in the finished film (particularly his version of the first act), but that he'll "always be honored that [he] got to play in such a cool sandbox."

Slater's original version of the script for Fantastic Four was said to feel more in tone to a Marvel Studios movie, being an action-packed superhero adventure in contrast to the final film's dark and realistic tone. It included the villains Galactus, who is the source for the titular characters' powers, Mole Man, and Doctor Doom as a Latverian dictator and herald to Galactus, in contrast to the antisocial programmer he was portrayed as in the finished film.

Slater wrote a draft of the live-action American film adaptation of Tsugumi Ohba and Takeshi Obata's manga series Death Note (2017), which was directed by Adam Wingard. The finished version of the film had its script revised by Kyle Killen.

Slater is the creator and executive producer of The Exorcist, a TV drama based on the film with the same name.

In November 2019, Slater was hired as the head writer and executive producer for the Disney+ series Moon Knight by Marvel Studios.

He had contributed to the Warner Bros. Pictures film Coyote vs. Acme with James Gunn, Jon Silberman, Josh Silberman and Samy Burch. The film was shelved in February 2024 before being acquired by Ketchup Entertainment for release in 2026.

In January 2022, Slater was hired to write a sequel to Mortal Kombat. In August 2022, Collider reported that Slater had co-written the screenplay for Godzilla x Kong: The New Empire with Terry Rossio and Simon Barrett.

In January 2023, it was revealed that Slater joined a writers' room assembled by James Gunn to map out the overarching story of the DC Universe.

In October 2025, during New York Comic Con, it was announced that Slater would return to write Mortal Kombat III.

== Filmography ==
=== Film ===
| Year | Title | Notes | Ref. |
|---|---|---|---|
| 2015 | The Lazarus Effect | Co-wrote with Luke Dawson | |
| 2015 | Fantastic Four | Co-wrote with Simon Kinberg and Josh Trank | |
| 2016 | Pet | | |
| 2017 | Death Note | Co-wrote with Charles Parlapanides and Vlas Parlapanides | |
| 2024 | Godzilla x Kong: The New Empire | Co-wrote with Terry Rossio and Simon Barrett | |
| 2025 | Superman | Special thanks | |
| 2026 | Mortal Kombat II | | |
| 2026 | Supergirl | Uncredited revisions | |
| 2026 | Coyote vs. Acme | Story writer with Samy Burch and James Gunn | |

Executive producer

- Visions (2015)
- Stephanie (2017)

=== Television ===
| Year | Title | Writer | Executive producer | Creator | Notes |
|---|---|---|---|---|---|
| 2016–2018 | The Exorcist | Yes | Yes | Yes | 4 episodes |
| 2019–2020 | The Umbrella Academy | Yes | Yes | No | Also developer and consultant; Teleplay: "We Only See Each Other at Weddings and Funerals" |
| 2022 | Moon Knight | Yes | Yes | Yes | 2 episodes |
