= Shutter (2008 film) =

- Theatrical release poster
- Directed by: Masayuki Ochiai
- Screenplay by: Luke Dawson
- Based on: Shutter by Banjong Pisanthanakun and Parkpoom Wongpoom
- Produced by: Takashige Ichise; Roy Lee; Doug Davison
- Starring: Joshua Jackson; Rachael Taylor
- Cinematography: Katsumi Yanagishima
- Edited by: Michael Knue; Tim Alverson
- Music by: Nathan Barr
- Production companies: Regency Enterprises; New Regency; Vertigo Entertainment; Ozla Pictures
- Distributed by: 20th Century Fox
- Release date: March 21, 2008
- Running time: 85 minutes (Theatrical cut); 90 minutes (Unrated cut)
- Countries: United States; Japan
- Languages: English; Japanese
- Budget: $8 million
- Box office: $48 million

Shutter is a 2008 American supernatural horror film directed by Masayuki Ochiai and distributed by 20th Century Fox. It was written by Luke Dawson and is a remake of the 2004 Thai film of the same name. Its story follows newlywed couple Ben and Jane who have just moved to Japan for a promising job opportunity. After a tragic car accident that leads to the death of a young girl, Ben begins noticing strange blurs in many of his fashion shoot photographs, which Jane suspects is the spirit of the dead girl that they killed. The film stars Joshua Jackson, Rachael Taylor, and Megumi Okina.

It was produced by Regency Enterprises and was released on March 21, 2008. It grossed $10.4 million in its opening weekend and $48 million worldwide, against an $8 million budget, making the film a box office success, but was negatively received from critics.

== Plot ==
Ben Shaw and his new wife Jane leave New York for Tokyo, Japan, where Ben has a job as a photographer. While traveling, Jane accidentally hits a girl in the middle of the wilderness. Later they start to find mysterious lights in their photos. Ben begins to complain of severe shoulder pain, and his friends begin to comment he's looking bent and hunched over, though the doctor he goes to see can find no cause. Ben's assistant takes them to her ex-boyfriend, who runs a magazine on the paranormal, revealing the lights are spirits of the dead. They then go to a psychic, Murase, who Ben soon claims is a hack and refuses to translate what he says.

Noticing light has gathered beneath a window of an office building in a photo, Jane goes inside the office where the light is coming from and takes photos. She encounters the girl's spirit, learns her name is Megumi Tanaka and that Ben knew her. When Jane confronts Ben, he admits that he and Megumi were once in a relationship but when her father died she became very obsessive and clingy. He eventually dumped her with help from his two friends, Adam and Bruno. Jane is upset with Ben and decides that they need to find Megumi.

They go to Megumi's home and find her decayed body; she had committed suicide with potassium cyanide. Elsewhere, Ben's friends Adam and Bruno are killed by Megumi. Adam's eye is torn out while shooting pictures and he dies from shock; Bruno kills himself by jumping from his apartment. Finally, Ben is attacked by the ghost of Megumi who attempts to choke him. After nearly throwing Jane through a nearby window, Megumi stops, leaving Ben alive.

After Megumi's funeral, Ben and Jane return to New York. Jane finds some recent photos showing Megumi walking into their closet. Inside, she finds a locked box containing an explicit video, taken by Ben, of Adam and Bruno with Megumi. When Jane confronts him, Ben reveals that he couldn't get Megumi to leave him alone, so they drugged her and took pictures that appeared to show Megumi sleeping with them, intending to use them to blackmail her. But Adam and Bruno took it too far and had raped her, with Ben making no effort to stop them. This traumatizing incident is what had driven Megumi to commit to suicide. This is also revealed to be the reason Ben had refused to translate the psychic, as he had seen this and tried to tell them. Disgusted by Ben's past actions and realizing that Megumi had actually been trying to warn her, Jane leaves him.

Angered, Ben begins photographing the apartment looking for Megumi. After throwing the camera across the room, it takes a picture of him, showing Megumi sitting on his shoulders. The movie pans back to the hospital where a nurse is weighing Ben, showing 275 pounds, the weight of two people. In an effort to rid himself of her, he electrocutes himself. Rendered completely catatonic, he is sent to a mental institution. In the final scene, we are shown his reflection in the glass on his door, revealing Megumi leaning on his back.

== Cast ==
- Joshua Jackson as Benjamin "Ben" Shaw
- Rachael Taylor as Jane Shaw
- Megumi Okina as Megumi Tanaka
- John Hensley as Adam
- David Denman as Bruno
- James Kyson Lee as Ritsuo
- Daisy Betts as Natasha
- Maya Hazen as Seiko Nakamura
- Yoshiko Miyazaki as Akiko
- Kei Yamamoto as Murase

== Production ==
In February 2007, The Hollywood Reporter informed that Joshua Jackson, David Denman, John Hensley and James Kyson Lee joined the cast of Shutter. Principal photography began on March 12, 2007, in Tokyo. Originally, Erica Leerhsen — known for her roles in Book of Shadows: Blair Witch 2 and The Texas Chainsaw Massacre (2003) — was set to star in the film as a character named Allison Carter.

== Release ==
=== Critical reception ===
On the review aggregator website Rotten Tomatoes, 11% of 65 critics' reviews are positive, with an average rating of 3.5/10. The website's consensus reads: "Being a remake of a Thai horror film instead of Japanese doesn't prevent Shutter from being another lame Asian horror remake." Metacritic, which uses a weighted average, assigned the film a score of 37 out of 100, based on 12 critics, indicating "generally unfavorable" reviews. Audiences surveyed by Cinemascore gave the film a grade of C on a scale of A+ to F.

=== Commercial response ===
The film was released March 21, 2008 in the United States and Canada and grossed $10,447,559 in 2,753 theaters in its opening weekend, ranking #3 at the box office behind Horton Hears a Who!'s second weekend and Tyler Perry's Meet the Browns. In total, the film grossed a total of $48,555,306 worldwide – $25,928,550 in the United States and Canada and $22,626,756 in other territories.

The film's $8 million budget and its $48 million worldwide grossing has secured the film as an extremely lucrative success.

== Home media ==
Shutter was released on DVD and Blu-ray on July 15, 2008. The Unrated Edition runs 5 minutes longer and includes commentary, featurettes, deleted scenes, and an alternate ending.

== See also ==
- List of ghost films

== Soundtrack ==
Shutter: Original Motion Picture Soundtrack

Film score by Nathan Barr
- Released: March 18, 2008
- Label: Lakeshore Records

=== Track listing ===
1. "Welcome to Tokyo" – 1:55
2. "We Hit a Girl!" – 2:58
3. "TGK" – 1:37
4. "Making Love" – 2:40
5. "Alone in Tokyo" – 0:59
6. "The Spirit Room" – 2:27
7. "The Argument" – 3:05
8. "Fly in the Eye" – 2:31
9. "Visiting Murase" – 2:27
10. "Jane Visits TGK" – 4:29
11. "The Truth" – 1:54
12. "I Saw Megumi" – 1:56
13. "Driving to Megumi's" – 3:18
14. "Rest in Peace" – 2:35
15. "Flip Book" – 3:21
16. "The Whole Truth" – 2:39
17. "Psych Ward" – 1:02
18. "Good to Me" (performed by Nathan Barr & Lisbeth Scott) – 3:23

Commercial songs from film, but not on soundtrack

- "Falling" – Performed by Krysten Berg
- "Just the Tip" – Performed by Becca Styles
- "Come on Shake" – Performed by Shake
- "That Kinda Booty" – Performed by Dem Naughty Boyz
- "Sky Business" – Performed by Matt Pelling & Paul Williard
- "Nasty Funky Crazy" – Performed by Becca Styles
- "Fallout" – Performed by Brydon Stace
- "In a War" – Performed by Michael Popieluch
- "Underwater" – Performed by A.M. Pacific
- "Omo Cha No Cha Cha Cha" – Performed by Akiyuki Nosaka, Osamu Yosioka, and Nonuyoshi Koshibe
- "Do Something" – Performed by Shane Tsurugi for Rock Life
- "Seventy-Seven" – Performed by Dino Zisis
- "Oh, Joey" – Performed by Lucky 13
