= Strangeways Here We Come (film) =

- Directed by: Chris Green
- Written by: Chris Green
- Starring: Chanel Cresswell; Lauren Socha; Elaine Cassidy; James Cooney; Oliver Coopersmith; Perry Fitzpatrick; James Foster; Saffron Hocking; Michelle Keegan; Stephen Lord; Mark Sheals; Ania Sowinski; Nina Wadia; Ste Johnston
- Release date: 5 October 2018 (UK)
- Running time: 86 minutes
- Country: England
- Language: English
- Box office: $3,473

Strangeways Here We Come is an English comedy-drama film, written and directed by Chris Green, in which a group of residents in a council estate decide to defeat a cruel loan shark who has been making their lives miserable. It was filmed in Salford. The name is taken from the Smiths' album of the same name.

== Cast ==
- Chanel Cresswell as Becki
- Lauren Socha as Shelley
- Elaine Cassidy as Steph
- James Cooney as Ollie
- Oliver Coopersmith as Aaron
- Perry Fitzpatrick as Marvin
- James Foster as Brian
- Saffron Hocking as Sian
- Michelle Keegan as Demi
- Stephen Lord as Nolan
- Mark Sheals as Max
- Ania Sowinski as Jean
- Nina Wadia as Lucy
- Ste Johnston as Gary

== Background ==
The film's writer and director, Chris Green, said: "This was made by someone who lived there. Growing up on Spike Island we saw a lot of violence. I can honestly say that 90 per cent of what you see in that film is true - it's stuff I've seen, stuff I've experienced or know about. Apart from the murder, obviously."

== Production ==
Filming began in April 2015.

== Reception ==
Upon its release in 2018, Strangeways Here We Come garnered overwhelmingly negative reviews from critics. The Times rated the film zero stars, and Mike McCahill, reviewing for The Guardian, rated the film 1/5 stars, commenting that critics would be "torn between highlighting those actors who make a few scenes tolerable or granting them the anonymity they surely longed for as they fled the cast-and-crew screening with heads under blankets." Benjamin Poole, for themoviewaffler.com, wrote "Vile stereotypes of people at the tough end of the social scale, disdainful representations seemingly designed to comfort and entertain those fortunate enough to never have to go near social housing."

In 2022, the film saw increased popularity on Netflix, appearing on the streaming site's "Most Watched" list. Green told Manchester Evening News: "I'm glad for everyone involved, and I'm proud to have come from Salford and being able to turn my experiences into entertainment. I'm not a multi-millionaire but I am doing the job that I love, writing for film and TV and telling the stories that inspire me."

== Commercial reception ==
Strangeways Here We Come grossed $3,473 worldwide.
