= Parkpoom Wongpoom =

Thai filmmaker and screenwriter

- ภาคภูมิ วงศ์ภูมิ
- Born: 1978 (age 47–48)
- Occupations: Filmmaker; screenwriter

Parkpoom Wongpoom (Thai: ภาคภูมิ วงศ์ภูมิ) (born 1978) is a Thai filmmaker and screenwriter. He is known for his work with filmmaker Banjong Pisanthanakun; the pair co-directed and co-wrote the 2004 hit Thai horror film, Shutter, and the 2007 horror film, Alone.

== Biography ==
=== Education and early career ===
Wongpoom graduated from the Department of Film and Video, Faculty of Communication Arts at Rangsit University in 2000.

His first short film, the 8-minute Luang Ta (Old Monk), was shown at film festivals, including the Thai Short Film and Video Festival, the Clermont-Ferrand International Short Film Festival, the Singapore International Film Festival and the Pusan International Short Film Festival. It won the Best Director and Best Thai Short Film awards at the Bangkok Film Festival in 2001

Parkpoom's second film, In the Eyes, is a 14-minute short about a boy's first sexual experience. It was featured at the Asiexpo in Lyon, France, the Puchon International Fantastic Film Festival, the Pusan International Film Festival, the Canadian World Wide Short Film Festival, Flickerfest in Australia, and the Solothurn Film Festival.

Parkpoom also served as a jury member for the short-film competitions at the 2004 Nokia Creative Arts Awards in Kuala Lumpur and the 2005 Bangkok International Film Festival.

=== Feature films ===
Parkpoom's first feature film, Shutter, was co-directed and co-written with Banjong Pisanthanakun. With a story about ghost images in photographs and a haunted photographer (portrayed by Ananda Everingham), the film was the biggest box-office hit in Thailand that year.

The two teamed up again in 2007 for Alone, which was screened at many film festivals, including the 2007 Bangkok International Film Festival, where it was in competition for Best ASEAN Film.

Both Shutter and Alone have been optioned for remakes in the United States.

== Filmography ==
=== Feature films ===
- Shutter (2004)
- Alone (2007)
- 4bia (2008)
- Phobia 2 (2009)
- Homestay (2018)

=== Television ===
- DELETE (2023)

=== Short films ===
- Luang ta (2000)
- In the Eyes (2003)
