= Science/Fiction =

- Loki episode
- Promotional poster
- Episode no.: Season 2 Episode 5
- Directed by: Justin Benson; Aaron Moorhead
- Written by: Eric Martin
- Cinematography by: Isaac Bauman
- Editing by: Calum Ross
- Original release date: November 2, 2023
- Running time: 46 minutes

Cast
- Aaron Moorhead as Clarence Anglin; Justin Benson as John Anglin; Jason Pennycooke as Lyle; Isaac Bauman as Dirt Bike Enthusiast; Alan Pearson as Dale; Caleb Johnston-Miller as Don's Child #1; Blake Johnston-Miller as Don's Child #2

Episode chronology
← Previous "Heart of the TVA"	Next → "Glorious Purpose"
- Loki season 2

"Science/Fiction" is the fifth episode of the second season and eleventh episode overall of the American television series Loki, based on Marvel Comics featuring the character Loki. It sees Loki working with Mobius M. Mobius, Hunter B-15, and other members of the Time Variance Authority (TVA) to navigate the multiverse in order to find Sylvie, Ravonna Renslayer, and Miss Minutes. The episode is set in the Marvel Cinematic Universe (MCU), sharing continuity with the films of the franchise. It was written by head writer Eric Martin, and directed by Justin Benson and Aaron Moorhead.

Tom Hiddleston reprises his role as Loki from the film series, starring alongside Sophia Di Martino (Sylvie), Gugu Mbatha-Raw (Renslayer), Wunmi Mosaku (Hunter B-15), Eugene Cordero, Tara Strong (Miss Minutes), Neil Ellice, Jonathan Majors, and Owen Wilson (Mobius) reprising their roles from the first season, alongside Rafael Casal, Kate Dickie, Liz Carr, and Ke Huy Quan. Development of the second season had begun by November 2020, which was formally confirmed in July 2021. In February 2022, Benson and Moorhead, and Martin were revealed to be directing and writing, respectively, the majority of the season.

"Science/Fiction" was released on Disney+ on November 2, 2023. The episode received positive reviews from critics for Benson & Moorhead's direction, visuals, and the performances (particularly those of Hiddleston and Di Martino), but received criticism for its characterization of Sylvie.

== Plot ==
Loki survives the Temporal Loom's explosion, but finds that everyone else in the Time Variance Authority (TVA) headquarters has vanished. He starts uncontrollably time slipping again, now across both space and time, barely escaping as the TVA headquarters spaghettifies. This brings him to branched timelines where his friends Mobius, Hunter B-15, Casey and Ouroboros were reset to their original lives as jet ski salesman Don in 2022 Cleveland, physician Dr. Verity Willis in 2012 New York, prisoner Frank Morris in 1962 Alcatraz, and writer/scientist Dr. A.D. Doug in 1994 Pasadena respectively. Loki arrives in close proximity to these people, who do not know him.

Wanting to time slip to before the explosion, Loki enlists Doug's help. Doug believes Loki's story and encourages Loki to control his time slipping. Loki focuses on his intent to save the TVA, but fails to time slip. Doug alternatively proposes that Loki gather everyone present at the explosion back together so that their collective temporal aura can send them back to the right time and place. To build a TemPad, Loki passes Doug a TVA Handbook that Loki had kept.

Loki time slips to Don's timeline and convinces Don to help by appealing to Don's wish to protect his sons. Doug arrives in Don's timeline using the TemPad he built over 19 months. Using the TemPad, Loki and Doug gather Don, Willis, and Frank to Doug's workshop. Loki then finds Sylvie at McDonald's in Broxton, Oklahoma. She has retained her memories and refuses to help as she wants to live her own life. Sylvie gets Loki to admit his true motivation: he wants his friends back and fears being alone. She encourages Loki to live his own life; Loki gives up and declares that Don, Willis, Frank and Doug should return to their lives.

However, when everything in Sylvie's timeline spaghettifies, she recognizes that the branched timelines are dying, changes her mind and goes to Doug's workshop to help Loki. However, before the group can take action, Doug's workshop also spaghettifies, as does Frank, Doug, Don, Willis and Sylvie. At this moment, Loki finally learns to control his time slipping by focusing on a person, instead of an event or a purpose. Loki time slips to a moment before Doug's workshop spaghettifies, tells the group that he can "rewrite the story", then time slips to before the Loom's explosion by focusing on Ouroboros.

== Production ==
=== Development ===
Development on a second season of Loki had begun by November 2020, which was confirmed through a mid-credits scene in the first season finale, which was released in July 2021. In February 2022, the directing duo Justin Benson and Aaron Moorhead were hired to direct a majority of the episodes for the second season. Eric Martin, a first-season writer who took over some of series' creator Michael Waldron's duties during production on that season, was set to write all six episodes of the second season. Executive producers for the season include Marvel Studios' Kevin Feige, Stephen Broussard, Louis D'Esposito, Victoria Alonso, Brad Winderbaum, and Kevin R. Wright, alongside star Tom Hiddleston, Benson and Moorhead, Martin, and Waldron. The fifth episode, titled "Science/Fiction", was written by Martin.

=== Writing ===
According to Eric Martin, the choice to feature a song by the Velvet Underground was a decision made by directors Benson and Moorhead. The episode also depicts Mobius M. Mobius's life as a single father, which was planned as Martin felt that Owen Wilson's real-life experience as a father of two children "brings so much heart and sweetness to it". The depiction of TVA members' lives prior to joining the TVA was done as planned, but Martin had difficulty in conceptualizing Casey's backstory. As he felt Casey was "so sweet and meek", he wanted to depict him as "being a tough guy" and originally intended to introduce Casey as being a lead biker in a biker bar, being inspired from Terminator 2 (1991), but later settled on depicting him in Alcatraz; he felt the overall tone would be preserved in doing so. He further explained that Loki's time-slipping powers originated from his newfound relationships and how he begins to develop a stronger sense of kinship, noting that "they dematerialize before his very eyes, and he'd already had that realization that this is why he's been doing it. Because of them" while citing Sylvie as the "capper on that" and thus spurring his ability to centralize and control the power.

=== Casting ===
The episode stars Tom Hiddleston as Loki, Sophia Di Martino as Sylvie, Wunmi Mosaku as Hunter B-15, Eugene Cordero as Casey, Ke Huy Quan as Ouroboros "O. B.", and Owen Wilson as Mobius M. Mobius. Also appearing in the episode are Jason Pennycooke as Lyle, Alan Pearson as Dale, and Caleb and Blake Johnston-Miller as Don's children, while directors Benson and Moorhead cameo as John Anglin and Clarence Anglin, and cinematographer Isaac Bauman cameos as a dirt bike enthusiast.

=== Filming and visual effects ===
Filming took place at Pinewood Studios in the United Kingdom, with Benson and Moorhead directing.

Visual effects for the episode were created by Framestore, Industrial Light & Magic, Yannix, SDFX Studios, FuseFX, Trixter, Cantina Creative, and Lola VFX.

== Marketing ==
After the episode's release, Marvel announced merchandise inspired by the episode as part of its weekly "Marvel Must Haves" promotion for each episode of the series, including apparel, accessories, and a Funko Pop for Don.

== Reception ==
=== Audience viewership ===
According to Nielsen Media Research which measures the number of minutes watched by United States audiences on television sets, Loki was the third-most watched original series across streaming services for the week of October 30–November 5, 2023, with 560 million minutes watched, which was an 8.9% increase from the previous week.

=== Critical response ===
The review aggregator website Rotten Tomatoes reports a 73% approval rating based on 11 reviews.

Space.com's Fran Ruiz praised directors Justin Benson and Aaron Moorhead for showing their "knack for cosmic horror" with the scene of Sylvie's timeline spaghettifying. Ruiz also highlighted the comedic elements brought by Owen Wilson and Ke Huy Quan, with the former contributing to easily consumable conversations between Loki and Mobius, and the latter's "deadpan line delivery" on developing time door technology "in just 19 months at the cost of losing his job and his wife ... distracting us from the question of how the hell he managed to do that."

The A.V. Club's William Hughes gave the episode an "A-" rating, highlighting Hiddleston's interactions with Ke Huy Quan and Owen Wilson, with the latter interaction having "new notes" such as Loki being "warmer" and Wilson playing a "wary huckster". Hughes praised the choice to have the Loki "stride back into the center stage with a real desire in his heart" to save the TVA, after playing second fiddle to others' "more aggressively sketched-out ambitions" in previous episodes of this season.

Vulture's Siddhant Adlakha rated the episode 4 stars out of 5, "quite handily the best of the season" so far, "much moodier" than previous episodes, "with far more room for the characters to breathe", citing Loki and Sylvie being able to vocalize all these known feelings and stew in them for extended periods". Also highlighted by Adlakha was the scene where Loki convinces Don to help, providing a "heartbreaking" moment when Don is reluctant to leave his sons even if they do not know that he left temporarily, showing Don "living and experiencing loss and love and annoyance, sometimes all at once", with the effective result that "'existence' is given tangible form this week", raising the stakes of the show regarding the end of existence.

Collider's Therese Lacson praised the episode for presenting "the most major growth we've seen in Loki's character since we first met him back in 2011 in Thor." Lacson described this show's variant of Loki as significantly better than the other Loki variant developed in Thor: The Dark World and Thor: Ragnarok, because this show's variant is "no longer simply attached to his brother or his family; he's his own person... That emotional beat [in Loki wanting friends] feels entirely earned." Lacson further wrote that Loki's true motivation, that "he doesn't know where he belongs without the TVA", was an extension to Loki's origin as "a kid pulled from his home and raised by a conqueror. He has never truly belonged anywhere."

Gizmodo's Sabina Graves wrote that in this episode, the show "[offers] an intriguing build-up to the season finale", showing how Loki reversed "the narrative of his fate as someone always destined to lose", as Loki now knows that he controls his own narrative. However, Graves criticized the character development of Sylvie from the "badass character" of season 1 to the "cynical and selfish" girl in season 2.
