= Breaking Brad =

- Loki episode
- Promotional poster
- Episode no.: Season 2 Episode 2
- Directed by: Dan DeLeeuw
- Written by: Eric Martin
- Cinematography by: Oliver Loncraine
- Editing by: Emma McCleave
- Original release date: October 12, 2023
- Running time: 51 minutes

Episode chronology
← Previous "Ouroboros"	Next → "1893"
- Loki season 2

"Breaking Brad" is the second episode of the second season and eighth episode overall of the American television series Loki, based on Marvel Comics featuring the character Loki. It sees Loki working with Mobius M. Mobius, Hunter B-15, and other members of the Time Variance Authority (TVA) to find Sylvie, while confronting rogue TVA Hunter X-5 and General Dox. The episode is set in the Marvel Cinematic Universe (MCU), sharing continuity with the films of the franchise. It was written by head writer Eric Martin, and directed by Dan DeLeeuw.

Tom Hiddleston reprises his role as Loki from the film series, starring alongside Sophia Di Martino (Sylvie), Wunmi Mosaku (Hunter B-15), Eugene Cordero, Neil Ellice, and Owen Wilson (Mobius) reprising their roles from the first season, alongside Rafael Casal (Hunter X-5), Kate Dickie (General Dox), and Ke Huy Quan. Development of the second season had begun by November 2020, which was formally confirmed in July 2021. Martin was revealed in February 2022 to be writing the majority of the season, while DeLeeuw was confirmed to be directing in the season in June 2023.

"Breaking Brad" was released on Disney+ on October 12, 2023. The episode received positive reviews from critics for its visuals, DeLeeuw's direction, and performances (particularly those of Hiddleston, Wilson, and Casal), but received some criticism for its narrative. Loki's characterization was highlighted by critics, comparing it to the character's earlier MCU appearances such as The Avengers.

== Plot ==
Loki and Mobius are on a mission to find Sylvie. After the TVA's General Dox and Hunter X-5 stop responding, Loki and Mobius attempt to track down X-5, thinking that he has encountered Sylvie. They find X-5 on the Sacred Timeline, living as a famous movie actor called Brad Wolfe, in London, UK in 1977. Wolfe flees, running from Hunter B-15 and overpowering Mobius, but Loki uses magic to capture Wolfe, who is brought back to TVA headquarters.

Casey discovers that Ravonna Renslayer communicated with Miss Minutes before both went missing, concludes that they are working together, and informs Hunter B-15, Loki and Mobius of this. Loki reveals his knowledge of Renslayer and TVA creator He Who Remains speaking like they were partners. Meanwhile, Ouroboros attempts to repair the Temporal Loom to safely accommodate the branching timelines without causing a meltdown but finds that he cannot access the Loom without help from Miss Minutes or the temporal aura of He Who Remains.

When Loki and Mobius initially interrogate Wolfe, he mocks Loki as a loser and criticizes Mobius for never checking what his life was like on the Sacred Timeline before Mobius joined the TVA. Mobius loses his cool and Loki then interrogates Wolfe alone, using a device to physically squeeze Wolfe until Wolfe admits abandoning Dox's mission and knowing Sylvie's location.

Loki, Mobius, and Wolfe travel to Broxton, Oklahoma on a branched timeline, and find Sylvie working as a McDonald's cashier. Loki tells Sylvie that the TVA is in danger and that he met her in the TVA's future, asking for her help to figure out what happened, but Sylvie refuses as she has become content with her mundane life. Wolfe proclaims that they are all in mortal danger, so Sylvie enchants him, revealing Dox's actual plan to simultaneously bomb and destroy all the branched timelines.

Loki, Mobius, and Sylvie travel to Dox's location and launch an attack to stop her ongoing operation, but most of the timeline branches were destroyed by then, via reset charges and modified TemPads. Dox is captured and some of her allies escape. Casey finds Renslayer's TemPad on one of the remaining branched timelines. Sylvie declares that the TVA is rotten for failing to defend the branched timelines, and leaves for Oklahoma with He Who Remains' TemPad in her possession.

== Production ==
=== Development ===
Development on a second season of Loki had begun by November 2020, which was confirmed through a mid-credits scene in the first-season finale, which was released in July 2021. In February 2022, Eric Martin, a first-season writer who took over some of series' creator Michael Waldron's duties during production on that season, was set to write all six episodes of the second season. Dan DeLeeuw, a visual effects supervisor and second unit director on several MCU films, was revealed as a director in the season in June 2023, directing the second episode. Executive producers for the season include Marvel Studios' Kevin Feige, Stephen Broussard, Louis D'Esposito, Victoria Alonso, Brad Winderbaum, and Kevin R. Wright, alongside star Tom Hiddleston, Justin Benson and Aaron Moorhead, Martin, and Waldron. The second episode, titled "Breaking Brad", was written by Martin, and was released on Disney+ on October 12, 2023. The title alludes to the television series Breaking Bad (2008–2013) as well as plot elements in the episode related to the phrase "breaking bad".

=== Writing ===
TVA Hunter X-5 is revealed to have become actor Brad Wolfe when he finds his real life on the Sacred Timeline, starring in the film Zaniac. Director Dan DeLeeuw explained that this version of the character would not have the same attributes as the villain from the comic does, explaining that the creative team "wanted to play around" with that being an Easter egg and referencing a more obscure comics character. Following the end of filming the first season finale "For All Time. Always.", Wright and actress Sophia Di Martino began an informal discussion of Sylvie's future, with Di Martino thinking she would be hungry after the death of He Who Remains concluded her long revenge mission. As development on the second season began, Wright felt that having Sylvie visit a 1980s McDonald's would be "appealing" for her as a place to "slow down", being drawn to that location based on the nostalgia a young child had going there after a sporting event or for a birthday party, which Sylvie never experienced. The 1982 McDonald's location was written into the script before approaching the company, a reverse of the typical brand partnerships in media, with McDonald's on board with the idea. A generic restaurant was considered, RoxBurger, part of the villainous MCU corporation Roxxon, but DeLeeuw pointed out that it did not tell any sort of story in the same way that McDonald's had a "timeless" quality to it that many could relate memories too.

=== Casting ===
The episode stars Tom Hiddleston as Loki, Sophia Di Martino as Sylvie, Wunmi Mosaku as Hunter B-15, Eugene Cordero as Casey, Rafael Casal as Hunter X-5 / Brad Wolfe, Kate Dickie as General Dox, Neil Ellice as Hunter D-90, Ke Huy Quan as Ouroboros "O. B.", and Owen Wilson as Mobius M. Mobius.

=== Design ===
To accurately portray 1982 Sylvie and her coworkers, costume designer Christine Wada consulted McDonald's official handbook for details on period-accurate uniforms. She ultimately had to create the uniforms from scratch, as she was unable to locate any authentic uniforms from the era to purchase.

=== Filming and visual effects ===
Filming took place at Pinewood Studios in the United Kingdom, with DeLeeuw directing, and Oliver Loncraine as cinematographer. Film grain was added to the entire episode to enhance the believability of the 1970s and 1980s time periods. DeLeeuw explained, "I think the palette was incredibly important with McDonald's because you started getting into the more vibrant eighties colors, in contrast to the more muted colors in the seventies." In the original draft of the script, there was a car chase sequence when Loki and Mobius are pursuing Wolfe. DeLeeuw felt that "didn't make a lot of sense" for Loki's character, and decided to "go a little bit more towards the dark Loki side", coming up with the horn shadow gags. To film X-5 being squeezed by a time cube, DeLeeuw originally suggested Casal pantomime the action, with visual effects adding the cube in later. As this "didn't sell", a smaller rising platform was built instead while members of the special effects team held pieces of plexiglass for Casal to push up against. Visual effects then removed the special effects team and riser from the shots.

The 1982 Broxton, Oklahoma McDonald's location was filmed in a former restaurant building on the outskirts of London, England, with Marvel Studios working with McDonald's archivist and historian Mike Bullington to ensure the set decorations were as accurate as possible. The company sent six pieces of restaurant equipment, such as cash registers and straw dispensers, to England for use on the set. Bullington suggested a drive-through be built at the set location, given they had become a popular feature of McDonald's restaurants at that time following their introduction in 1975. Visual effects for the episode were created by FuseFX, Industrial Light & Magic, Yannix, SDFX Studios, Framestore, Trixter, Cantina Creative, and Lola VFX.

== Marketing ==
After the episode's release, Marvel announced merchandise inspired by the episode as part of its weekly "Marvel Must Haves" promotion for each episode of the series, including apparel, accessories, a Hot Toys Sylvie figure, and an O. B. Funko Pop.

== Reception ==
=== Audience viewership ===
According to Nielsen Media Research who measure the number of minutes watched by United States audiences on television sets, Loki was the fourth-most watched original series across streaming services for the week of October 9–15, 2023, with 588 million minutes watched, which was a 31.8% increase from the previous week.

=== Critical response ===
The review aggregator website Rotten Tomatoes reports an 82% approval rating, based on 11 reviews.

Space.com's Fran Ruiz commended Tom Hiddleston and Owen Wilson for successfully recapturing key moments from season 1 between Loki and Mobius. He also noted that their character development is achieved through actions that don't strongly rely on large set pieces and/or complex devices, which is impressive given the show's significant narrative elements.

Vulture's Siddhant Adlakha rated the episode 2 out of 5 stars, describing it as "confounding" and feeling stagnant, as it fails to advance character arcs or deliver engaging stories within the multiverse. He criticized the portrayal of multiple branching timelines, suggesting that the lack of a visual representation diminished the emotional impact of the destruction.

The A.V. Club's William Hughes assigned a "B" rating to the episode, praising its visuals, performances, and energetic tone. However, he criticized the writing for its inconsistent character motivations, which sometimes shifts dramatically to suit the plot. He highlighted Rafael Casal's performance as Hunter X-5, noting it combined traits of an "asshole co-worker" with a genuine threat.

Collider's Therese Lacson described the episode as "comfortable", showcasing Loki and Mobius’ playful dynamics, including a rare moment of Loki using magic. She emphasized the chemistry between Loki and Sylvie, calling their interactions the highlight of the episode due to the characters' tension and engaging back-and-forth.

Gizmodo's Sabina Graves praised Rafael Casal's standout performance, where he effectively challenged Hiddleston and Wilson, prompting Hiddleston to draw on his old Loki persona to match Hunter X-5's cruelty. She also remarked on the reunion between Loki and Sylvie, which conveyed a romantic, bittersweet quality, noting that the actors’ subtle movements and eye contact added depth to their connection.
