= Heart of the TVA =

- Loki episode
- Promotional poster
- Episode no.: Season 2 Episode 4
- Directed by: Aaron Moorhead; Justin Benson
- Written by: Eric Martin; Katharyn Blair
- Cinematography by: Isaac Bauman
- Editing by: Paul Zucker
- Original release date: October 26, 2023
- Running time: 50 minutes

Episode chronology
| ← Previous "1893" | Next → "Science/Fiction" |
- Loki season 2

"Heart of the TVA" is the fourth episode of the second season and tenth episode overall of the American television series Loki, based on Marvel Comics featuring the character Loki. It sees Loki working with Mobius M. Mobius, Hunter B-15, and other members of the Time Variance Authority (TVA) to navigate the multiverse in order to find Sylvie, Ravonna Renslayer, and Miss Minutes. The episode is set in the Marvel Cinematic Universe (MCU), sharing continuity with the films of the franchise. It was written by head writer Eric Martin and Katharyn Blair, and directed by Aaron Moorhead and Justin Benson.

Tom Hiddleston reprises his role as Loki from the film series, starring alongside Sophia Di Martino (Sylvie), Gugu Mbatha-Raw (Renslayer), Wunmi Mosaku (Hunter B-15), Eugene Cordero, Tara Strong (Miss Minutes), Neil Ellice, Jonathan Majors, and Owen Wilson (Mobius) reprising their roles from the first season, alongside Rafael Casal, Kate Dickie, Liz Carr, and Ke Huy Quan. Development of the second season had begun by November 2020, which was formally confirmed in July 2021. In February 2022, Benson and Moorhead, and Martin were revealed to be directing and writing, respectively, the majority of the season.

"Heart of the TVA" was released on Disney+ on October 26, 2023. The episode received mixed reviews for its writing and ending, but received praise for its visuals, Benson & Moorhead's direction, and the performances (particularly those of Hiddleston, Di Martino, and Mbatha-Raw).

== Plot ==
Artificial intelligence Miss Minutes shows Ravonna Renslayer a recording from the past, showing that He Who Remains thanked Renslayer for her help in his war and proposed that she lead the Time Variance Authority (TVA) together with him, but when she returned to the TVA, He Who Remains commanded Miss Minutes to erase the memories of Renslayer and other TVA employees. Back in the present, after revealing that Renslayer was the commander of He Who Remains' army, Miss Minutes proposes to work together with Renslayer without needing him.

After He Who Remains' variant Victor Timely arrives at TVA headquarters, he is asked by Loki and Mobius to assist in fixing the Temporal Loom, which is reaching catastrophic failure due to the inability to handle branching timelines. Timely is brought to meet Ouroboros, who reveals that he was inspired by Timely, who was in turn inspired by Ouroboros' TVA Handbook in an ontological paradox. Together, Ouroboros and Timely build a Throughput Multiplier to fix the Loom.

Hunter B-15 visits the detained group of General Dox, her loyalists, and Brad Wolfe, leaving them after giving them an offer to work together to defend the TVA. Renslayer and Miss Minutes then visit the detainees, offering a life on the timeline for anyone who allies with them to take over the TVA. Only Wolfe agrees, with Dox and her loyalists choosing to be crushed to death by Miss Minutes rather than help Renslayer. Wolfe then prunes Hunter D-90 and kidnaps Timely.

Loki and Sylvie rush to rescue Timely. Miss Minutes asserts control of the TVA system, temporarily trapping Sylvie. She and Loki encounter his time-slipping past self; Loki prunes his past self. (Note: As depicted in "Ouroboros") Ouroboros reboots the system to deactivate Miss Minutes, which also shuts down the devices that suppress magic in the TVA. This enables Sylvie to enchant Wolfe, controlling him to prune Renslayer, rescuing Timely.

Timely's temporal aura is able to restore access to the Loom. Loki volunteers to approach the Loom to activate the Throughput Multiplier, but Timely insists on doing it as he can troubleshoot problems. However, Timely is instantly spaghettified upon exposure to the Loom's increased temporal radiation, leaving the Throughput Multiplier unused. The Temporal Loom explodes, with the blast wave spreading towards Loki, Mobius, Sylvie, B-15, Casey and Ouroboros in the TVA.

== Production ==
=== Development ===
Development on a second season of Loki had begun by November 2020, which was confirmed through a mid-credits scene in the first-season finale, which was released in July 2021. In February 2022, the directing duo Justin Benson and Aaron Moorhead were hired to direct a majority of the episodes for the second season, including the fourth episode. Eric Martin, a first-season writer who took over some of series' creator Michael Waldron's duties during production on that season, was set to write all six episodes of the second season. Executive producers for the season include Marvel Studios' Kevin Feige, Stephen Broussard, Louis D'Esposito, Victoria Alonso, Brad Winderbaum, and Kevin R. Wright, alongside star Tom Hiddleston, Benson and Moorhead, Martin, and Waldron. The fourth episode, titled "Heart of the TVA", was written by Martin and Katharyn Blair, and was released on Disney+ on October 26, 2023.

=== Writing ===
Eric Martin had felt the episode was the "pivot" for Loki's story and that the season's ending would be complex rather than being a "straight line that we expect". Following production, Kathryn Blair also helped Martin in completing the script for the episode. He affirmed that the scene in which He Who Remains erased Renslayer's flashbacks served as the "microcosm" that was symbolic of his memory erasure for the TVA. He also felt that the ontological paradox resulting from the creation of the TVA Handbook was "the fun thing" about doing a series featuring time-travelling, and felt it was the "ouroboros of it all". Ultimately, the episode served as a continuation for Martin's overall theme for the season, which was focusing on power vacuums and dictatorships, intending to push the characters and TVA to their "breaking points" and examine if reform was possible. For the ending, Kevin Wright felt the story executed what he deemed "story acceleration", as it would subvert expectations that the season's story would focus on fixing the Temporal Loom but instead would "just ... breaks right in the middle". By doing so, Wright felt that it provided a satisfactory cliffhanger ending.

=== Casting ===
The episode stars Tom Hiddleston as Loki, Sophia Di Martino as Sylvie, Gugu Mbatha-Raw as Ravonna Renslayer, Wunmi Mosaku as Hunter B-15, Eugene Cordero as Casey, Rafael Casal as Hunter X-5 / Brad Wolfe, Tara Strong as Miss Minutes, Kate Dickie as General Dox, Liz Carr as Judge Gamble, Neil Ellice as Hunter D-90, Jonathan Majors as Victor Timely, Ke Huy Quan as Ouroboros, and Owen Wilson as Mobius M. Mobius.

=== Filming and visual effects ===
Filming took place at Pinewood Studios in the United Kingdom, with Benson and Moorhead directing, and Isaac Bauman serving as cinematographer. Visual effects for the episode were created by Trixter, Rising Sun Pictures, FuseFX, Framestore, Cantina Creative, and Lola VFX. Bauman had said the ending for the episode, in which Timely gets spaghettified after stepping onto the platform and a close-up shot on Loki's face was planned from the beginning as he knew "the end is coming... it just felt like being as close as we could on his eyes as the universe was being destroyed – and he's the one that blew it, basically – was the way to go." For the scene, the crew directed Hiddleston to look at an array of 24 LED panels that was arranged outside of the temporal core control room.

== Marketing ==
After the episode's release, Marvel announced merchandise inspired by the episode as part of its weekly "Marvel Must Haves" promotion for each episode of the series, including apparel and Funko Pops for Loki and Mobius.

== Reception ==
=== Audience viewership ===
According to Nielsen Media Research which measures the number of minutes watched by United States audiences on television sets, Loki was the fourth-most watched original series across streaming services for the week of October 23–29, 2023, with 514 million minutes watched, which was a 2.1% decrease from the previous week.

=== Critical response ===
The review aggregator website Rotten Tomatoes reports a 69% approval rating with an average of rated reviews of 7.30/10, based on 16 reviews.

The A.V. Club's William Hughes rated the episode "A-", enjoying the conversation between Loki and Sylvie regarding the possibility of reforming the TVA, opining it was allegorical to if real-life institutions can be reformed after doing harm to people. He highlighted Loki's character development into a "benevolent" god with a "patrician/protective stance", evolving from his "stop thinking and worship me" stance from The Avengers. However, he disliked the scenes with Victor Timely and O. B. as he perceived it as being "Exposition Soup" and thought the pacing rushed towards the ending. However, Hughes felt the ending was the best part of the episode, writing that it is "a hilarious subversion of Loki's more traditional storytelling impulses, which can sometimes fall back on gung-ho optimism". Space.com's Fran Ruiz described the ending of the episode as a "wild cliffhanger" and possibly "earth-shattering" for the MCU. Ruiz enjoyed the beginning of the episode, and felt that the centrality of the TVA Loom was key to the show's premise for better or worse. He cited Sylvie's berating of Mobius's "sweet tooth" as being a thematic development and enjoyed the writing of Hunter B-15's character. Collider's Therese Lacson described the episode as filled with "big moments" leading up to "complete destruction and uncertainty". Lacson highlighted the "heartfelt" discussion that Loki and Sylvie had in the TVA on the need to "play god" as showcasing Loki's character development, as in the past, Loki "viewed softness as a weakness", but now viewed mercy as necessary to save lives. While Sylvie "is truly chaos embodied", Lacson wrote that Loki and Sylvie's "diametric difference" can complement each other if they were to rule the TVA. She also surmised that O. B. could be a Kang variant based on the ontological paradox regarding the TVA Handbook, as she felt it could be a possibility due to the differing appearances of variants.

Vulture's Siddhant Adlakha rated the episode 2 stars out of 5, writing that it finished with a "bang that feels like a whimper" as he felt the show's depiction of death was minimized as he was sure that characters who died in this episode will return in the next. He enjoyed Mbatha-Raw's performance upon discovering He Who Remain's betrayal, but felt that the pacing did not allow for "much thought" on the event, and felt the central premise of the show was "dramatic wheel-spinning" and thought the ideologies presented were incongruous. He felt that during Sylvie and Loki's conversation about the TVA, Sylvie was "in the right", but critiqued Loki's dialogue as being a "centrist speech steeped in political cowardice". However, he praised Benson and Moorhead's collective direction and the episode's visual aesthetic. Like Adlakha, Gizmodo's Sabina Graves also felt that the ending's implications were trivialized due to the introduction of the multiverse and if there is "no consequence to MCU at large, allegedly?" She disliked the introduction of side characters, feeling that they were underdeveloped and that the plot was too focused on Loki and Mobius. Graves also criticized the first half of the show for having characters "dicking around" and the show being "dragged out", but highlighted Mosaku's "standout dramatic acting", Carr's performance as Hunter B-15, and Judge Gamble discussing how to unite and transform the TVA.
