= The Variant =

- Loki episode
- Promotional poster
- Episode no.: Season 1 Episode 2
- Directed by: Kate Herron
- Written by: Elissa Karasik
- Cinematography by: Autumn Durald Arkapaw
- Editing by: Paul Zucker
- Original release date: June 16, 2021
- Running time: 54 minutes

Cast
- Neil Ellice as Hunter D-90; Kate Berlant as Ren Faire Woman; Lucius Baston as a male shopper; Austin Freeman as Randy; Hawk Walts as a country hoss

Episode chronology
← Previous "Glorious Purpose"	Next → "Lamentis"
- Loki season 1

"The Variant" is the second episode of the first season of the American television series Loki, based on Marvel Comics featuring the character Loki. It follows an alternate version of the character who cannot return to his own timeline and is now working with the mysterious Time Variance Authority (TVA) to hunt down a fugitive variant of himself. The episode is set in the Marvel Cinematic Universe (MCU), sharing continuity with the films of the franchise. It was written by Elissa Karasik and directed by Kate Herron.

Tom Hiddleston reprises his role as Loki from the film series, with Sophia Di Martino, Gugu Mbatha-Raw, Wunmi Mosaku, Eugene Cordero, Sasha Lane, Tara Strong, and Owen Wilson also starring. Herron joined the series in August 2019. Filming took place at Pinewood Atlanta Studios, with location filming in the Atlanta metropolitan area.

"The Variant" was released on Disney+ on June 16, 2021. Critics praised the episode's twist ending.

== Plot ==
Loki joins a Time Variance Authority (TVA) mission to the site of an attack by the fugitive variant of him in 1985 Oshkosh, Wisconsin. They find that TVA Hunter C-20 has been kidnapped, but Loki derails the mission by stalling and attempting to bargain his way into immediately meeting the Time-Keepers, who supposedly created the TVA and the Sacred Timeline. He also requests assurances that he will not be killed after the Variant is caught. TVA analyst Mobius M. Mobius realizes that Loki is lying about the Variant being nearby, so the TVA resets this branched timeline.

Back at TVA headquarters, TVA judge Ravonna Renslayer objects to Loki's involvement, but Mobius convinces her to give Loki another chance. After researching TVA files and learning of Asgard's Ragnarok, (Note: As depicted in the film Thor: Ragnarok (2017).) Loki theorizes that the Variant is hiding near apocalyptic events where they can go undetected by the TVA because nothing they do can change the timeline there. Loki and Mobius prove this possibility by visiting Pompeii in 79 AD, where Loki warns locals about the coming eruption of Mount Vesuvius without changing the timeline. Using a clue previously garnered from 1549 Aix-en-Provence following one of the Variant's attacks, Loki and Mobius deduce that the Variant is hiding during a hurricane in 2050 Alabama. At superstore Roxxcart's hurricane shelter, Loki, Mobius, and TVA agents are ambushed by the Variant, who uses enchantment to possess the bodies of Hunter B-15 and a sequence of locals.

While Loki engages the Variant, the other agents find a distressed C-20, who reveals she had disclosed the Time-Keepers' location. The Variant is revealed as a female incarnation of Loki and rejects his offer to overthrow the Time-Keepers together. Instead, she activates and sends several stolen time reset charges to various locations and points along the Sacred Timeline, creating numerous new branched timelines and throwing the TVA into disarray. She teleports away, with Loki following her.

== Production ==
=== Development ===
By September 2018, Marvel Studios was developing a limited series starring Tom Hiddleston's Loki from the Marvel Cinematic Universe (MCU) films. Loki was confirmed to be in development by Disney CEO Bob Iger in November. Kate Herron was hired to direct the series in August 2019. Herron and head writer Michael Waldron executive produce alongside Hiddleston and Marvel Studios' Kevin Feige, Louis D'Esposito, Victoria Alonso, and Stephen Broussard. The second episode, titled "The Variant", was written by Elissa Karasik.

=== Writing ===
Mobius is someone who, perhaps for the first time in [Loki's] life, he thinks he might be able to trust, and perhaps trusts him, and he doesn't want to betray that trust. But at the same time, he has to see what's going on. He can't help himself but follow, because it's too strange and provokes so much curiosity within him.

— Hiddleston on Loki's decision to follow the Variant through the time door at the end of the episode

Owen Wilson spoke to the growing friendship between Mobius M. Mobius and Loki, saying although the relationship is "bumpy", it was "well-earned in that they really sort of put each other through things that are grueling and upsetting" and both have a mutual admiration for the other. Hiddleston added that Mobius is able to confront Loki "without judgment or without any kind of emotional investment" and challenge him intellectually. Their relationship is also one built on information, as Loki has insight to the Variant, while Mobius can give Loki information on the Time Variance Authority (TVA). Hiddleston suggested the scene set in Pompeii before the eruption of Mount Vesuvius in 79 AD, as he had a fascination with this event in history after visiting the area as a teenager. Hiddleston also re-learned Latin ahead of the series so Loki could warn the Pompeians of the eruption in the scene.

Revealing Sophia Di Martino as the Variant in the episode was Waldron's way to continue "building the thrill ride" of the series since her introduction would "reshuffle the deck of the show" moving forward. Herron felt "The Variant" was the first chapter of the series, after "Glorious Purpose" acted more as a prologue. An early outline for the episode had proposed showing more of what the Variant did on the timeline so the TVA would search for her, but Marvel wanted the focus to remain on Loki.

=== Casting ===
The episode stars Tom Hiddleston as Loki, Sophia Di Martino as the Variant, Gugu Mbatha-Raw as Ravonna Renslayer, Wunmi Mosaku as Hunter B-15, Eugene Cordero as Casey, Sasha Lane as Hunter C-20, Tara Strong as the voice of Miss Minutes, and Owen Wilson as Mobius M. Mobius. Also appearing are Neil Ellice as Hunter D-90, comedian Kate Berlant as the Ren Faire Woman, and several actors playing bystanders who are controlled by the Variant: Lucius Baston as a male shopper, Austin Freeman as Randy, and Hawk Walts as a country hoss. Herron, a comedy fan, was looking to find comedians who would be fun to include in the series and approached Berlant to appear; Berlant agreed, believing the role sounded "really fun".

=== Filming and visual effects ===
Filming took place at Pinewood Atlanta Studios in Atlanta, Georgia, with Herron directing, and Autumn Durald Arkapaw serving as cinematographer. Location filming took place in the Atlanta metropolitan area, including at the Atlanta Marriott Marquis, which was used for the TVA's headquarters, and a vacant discount store in Georgia for Roxxcart. David Fincher was an influence on the series for Herron and Arkapaw; the approach they took to filming Loki reading through files during the episode was a reference to Seven (1995). Herron hoped to make the various locations in history feel grounded and not "glossy". For example, she chose to make the Renaissance fair "muddy" opposed to the "shiny, bubblegum version" of the 1980s, and the Roxxcart store in 2050 a reminder of the horrors of apocalypses, such as global warming. Herron felt Roxxcart, which is set in 2050, was a fun way to continue the series' dark sense of humor by showing extremely expensive products as a result of inflation. However, Pompeii was heightened since it was from Loki's perspective and the location was used to show him solving where the Variant was hiding.

Hunter B-15 taking Loki's knives away from him was one of the final moments shot for the series. As Mosaku, Wilson, and Hiddleston rehearsed the moment, they were able to figure out the perfect timing that was needed. Ryan Parker of The Hollywood Reporter felt Loki seeing the Variant transferring her powers among people by touching them was a direct homage to the film Fallen (1998), which features a similar scene and sequence. When the Variant possesses Hunter B-15 in this sequence, Mosaku based her performance on Hiddleston's since the audience did not know that the Variant was not "classic Loki" at that point. She said the sequence was filmed over many days. The production break because of the COVID-19 pandemic allowed Herron to adjust some of the material that had already been shot to help with the series' tone. Some of the new material added once production resumed included "bits from the TVA" such as Loki and Mobius' chat about religion and Loki's salad metaphor for his theory on the apocalypses.

On the Roxxcart set, Arkapaw used overhead cool, white fluorescent lights which had "kind of a green kick"; Fincher also utilized green undertones in his films. She created a color correction lookup-table to help give the set its "clinical" tone. The set location already had the fluorescent fixtures, with Arkapaw replacing the bulbs with RGB ones that gave her greater control of their functions, such as turning them on and off or switching their color. Also on this set, Arkapaw shot many of the scenes with the camera below the waist. She explained, "I'm just a bigger fan of seeing a ceiling than a floor. It's an appreciation I have, as far as it feeling more mysterious. When a character is looking more mysterious, and you're not trusting them, you're trying to figure them out, I love that kind of framing." Blue screen was used at the ends of the aisle to make them appear longer than they were on the set. Before the reveal of the Variant as a female version of Loki, Herron used male and female stunt doubles for her appearances earlier in this episode and at the end of the last episode, to keep the audience guessing as to who the Variant was.

Visual effects for the episode were created by Crafty Apes, Method Studios, Cantina Creative, Luma Pictures, Rodeo FX, FuseFX, and Rise.

=== Music ===
Johann Sebastian Bach's "Suite No. 3 in D major, BWV 1068" is featured in the episode, an additional reference from Herron to Seven since it was also featured in that film. Also used in the episode was Pyotr Ilyich Tchaikovsky's "18 Morceaux, Op. 72: No. 2. Berceuse" performed by theremin player Clara Rockmore and her sister, pianist Nadia Reisenberg; this track was on the playlist Herron had created when she presented her pitch for the series and the theremin was one of the instruments she and series' composer Natalie Holt were drawn to for the score of the series. "Holding Out for a Hero" by Bonnie Tyler is also featured at the beginning of the episode. After its appearance in the episode, "Holding Out for a Hero" topped Billboard's Top TV Songs chart in partnership with Tunefind for June 2021. The song had 4.5 million U.S. on-demand streams and 4,000 downloads, according to MRC Data.

== Marketing ==
After the episode's release, Marvel announced merchandise inspired by the episode as part of its weekly "Marvel Must Haves" promotion for each episode of the series, including Funko Pops of Ravonna Renslayer, Miss Minutes, and Hunter B-15, a Loki Hot Toys Cosbaby figure, apparel, and accessories. Marvel also released a promotional poster for "The Variant", which featured a quote from the episode.

== Release ==
"The Variant" was released on Disney+ on June 16, 2021. The episode, along with the rest of Loki's first season, was released on Ultra HD Blu-ray and Blu-ray on September 26, 2023.

== Reception ==
=== Audience viewership ===
Nielsen Media Research, who measure the number of minutes watched by United States audiences on television sets, listed Loki as the most-watched original streaming series for the week of June 14 to 20, 2021. 886 million minutes were viewed across the available first two episodes, which was a 21% increase over the previous week.

=== Critical response ===
The review aggregator website Rotten Tomatoes reported a 95% approval rating with an average score of 7.7/10 based on 37 reviews. The site's critical consensus reads, "Following an exposition-heavy premiere it's a little surprising how much table-setting "The Variant" has to do, but one swift twist quickly thrusts the story into hyperdrive."

Alan Sepinwall at Rolling Stone felt after the set-up for the series required in the first episode, "The Variant" allowed the series to "settle into" being "a time-traveling cop show". Sepinwall hoped this would not be the entirety of the series, and believed by the end of the episode it would only be one aspect of Loki. He felt the Roxxcart sequence was "more sluggish than tense at times" but introducing Di Martino suggested "some fun times are ahead". The production design of the TVA continued to be a standout for Sepinwall, calling it the "most impressive part of the whole show". Giving the episode a 7 out of 10, Siddhant Adlakha from IGN said the series' comedy moments continued to be "on point", while "its dramatic conceit still feels half-baked". Like Sepinwall, he felt the series was establishing its tone, stating between the various settings, costumes, and actor timings and movements, Loki felt like "a hybrid between police procedural and workplace sitcom", comparing some of Loki's scenes learning in the TVA to the Team Thor mockumentary short films. The scenes at Roxxcart saw the various actors playing the Variant "chewing scenery in delightful fashion" which was "incredibly goofy, in the best possible way". Adlakha added that this scene "leans into self-aware horror, but it also establishes how minuscule Loki's scheme to dethrone the Time Keepers actually is, compared to the Variant's plan".

Reviewing the episode for The A.V. Club, Caroline Siede believed it was "kind of funny" that The Falcon and the Winter Soldier had been described as a "buddy cop show" when that description was more fitting for Loki since Hiddleston and Wilson had a "much more interesting dynamic". "The Variant" did a better job of establishing the series' premise than the premiere episode did according to Siede, although it still had a lot of exposition and less subversive humor as the premiere. The lengthy dialogue scenes, particularly Loki and Mobius' that started about jet skis and ended about the nature of existence, were a highlight since it made all of the characters "feel more lived-in". For Siede, Di Martino's reveal confirmed the series would be "full of twists and reveals", and seeing the Variant blow up the Sacred Timeline was "an exhilarating cliffhanger" that suggested the series would not simply have a procedural structure and had yet to reveal who would actually be the heroes and villains. Siede gave the episode a "B+". In a recap of the episode, Andy Welch of The Guardian called the onscreen chemistry between Hiddleston and Wilson the series' "greatest strength", saying their "cat-and-mouse relationship" was reminiscent of Frank Abagnale Jr and Carl Hanratty's in Catch Me If You Can (2002); Welch also opined that Loki's confrontation with the rogue variant of himself was "enjoyable, and brilliantly played by Hiddleston". Writing for Entertainment Weekly, Lauren Morgan said, "The second episode continues to be heavy on exposition, which is a little concerning since there are only six of them, but the surprise at the end of this one promises to kick the plot into high gear."
