= Glorious Purpose (Loki season 2) =

- Loki episode
- Promotional poster
- Episode no.: Season 2 Episode 6
- Directed by: Aaron Moorhead; Justin Benson
- Written by: Eric Martin
- Cinematography by: Isaac Bauman
- Editing by: Paul Zucker
- Original release date: November 9, 2023
- Running time: 58 minutes

Cast
- Nasri Thompson as Young Victor Timely; Caleb Johnston-Miller as Don's Child #1; Blake Johnston-Miller as Don's Child #2

Episode chronology
← Previous "Science/Fiction"	Next → —
- Loki season 2

"Glorious Purpose" is the sixth episode and season finale of the second season, and the twelfth overall, of the American television series Loki, based on Marvel Comics featuring the character Loki. It sees Loki working with Mobius M. Mobius, Hunter B-15, and other members of the Time Variance Authority (TVA) to navigate the multiverse in order to find Sylvie, Ravonna Renslayer, and Miss Minutes. The episode is set in the Marvel Cinematic Universe (MCU), sharing continuity with the films of the franchise. It was written by head writer Eric Martin, and directed by Aaron Moorhead and Justin Benson.

Tom Hiddleston reprises his role as Loki from the film series, starring alongside Sophia Di Martino (Sylvie), Gugu Mbatha-Raw (Renslayer), Wunmi Mosaku (Hunter B-15), Eugene Cordero, Tara Strong (Miss Minutes), Neil Ellice, Jonathan Majors, and Owen Wilson (Mobius) reprising their roles from the first season, alongside Rafael Casal, Kate Dickie, Liz Carr, and Ke Huy Quan. Development of the second season had begun by November 2020, which was formally confirmed in July 2021. In February 2022, Benson and Moorhead, and Martin were revealed to be directing and writing, respectively, the majority of the season.

"Glorious Purpose" was released on Disney+ on November 9, 2023.

== Plot ==
Loki attempts to avert the Temporal Loom's explosion at the Time Variance Authority (TVA) headquarters by repeatedly time slipping to moments in time before the explosion and using his experience to take different actions. After centuries of learning from Ouroboros the science behind the Throughput Multiplier, Loki takes actions that result in Victor Timely successfully approaching the Loom, activating the Throughput Multiplier, and returning safely. However, the Loom still explodes, as no adjustment to it can accommodate the infinite timeline branches.

Changing his strategy to wanting to prevent the Sacred Timeline from branching, Loki time slips to the moment before Sylvie kills He Who Remains. (Note: As depicted in "For All Time. Always." (2021)) Loki repeatedly tries to stop her, but she says he will have to kill her to stop her; he does not, and she always succeeds. When Loki asks He Who Remains why he never fights back, He Who Remains freezes Sylvie in time, recognizing Loki's time slipping and indicating that he "paved that road". When Loki shows the ability to freeze time, He Who Remains reveals that the Loom is a fail-safe; overloading it protects the Sacred Timeline by deleting the branched timelines along with the TVA. Loki is left with a choice: destroy the Loom and risk an apocalyptic multiversal war by He Who Remains's variants, or kill Sylvie to protect He Who Remains and the Sacred Timeline.

Loki consults Mobius and Sylvie for advice at different moments in time. (Note: During the events of "Glorious Purpose" (2021) and "Science/Fiction" (2023), respectively) Mobius tells Loki to accept burdens for the greater good, while Sylvie urges Loki to let He Who Remains die to maintain free will. Loki time slips again, (Note: As depicted in "Heart of the TVA" (2023)) choosing to replace Timely in approaching the Loom. Loki destroys the Loom, magically rejuvenates the dying timelines and rearranges them into a tree-like structure with himself at the center, committing himself to oversee the branches of the multiverse alone at the End of Time.

After Loki's actions, the TVA accepts the infinite timeline branches and now tracks He Who Remains's variants, with Mobius reporting that one of them has been stopped at Earth-616's "adjacent realm". (Note: This is referring to events in the Quantum Realm, as depicted in Ant-Man and the Wasp: Quantumania (2023)) Hunter B-15 becomes one of the TVA's leaders. Ouroboros reactivates a now-friendly Miss Minutes and writes a new TVA Handbook with Timely as co-author. In one timeline, a young Timely does not receive the TVA Handbook in 1868. In the Void, Ravonna Renslayer awakens near a TVA crest and sees Alioth. Mobius retires from the TVA; he and Sylvie observe his variant Don and his children.

== Production ==
=== Development ===
Development on a second season of Loki had begun by November 2020, which was confirmed through a mid-credits scene in the first-season finale, which was released in July 2021. In February 2022, the directing duo Justin Benson and Aaron Moorhead were hired to direct a majority of the episodes for the second season. Eric Martin, a first-season writer who took over some of series' creator Michael Waldron's duties during production on that season, was set to write all six episodes of the second season. Executive producers for the season include Marvel Studios's Kevin Feige, Stephen Broussard, Louis D'Esposito, Victoria Alonso, Brad Winderbaum, and Kevin R. Wright, alongside star Tom Hiddleston, Benson and Moorhead, Martin, and Waldron. The sixth episode, titled "Glorious Purpose", was written by Martin.

=== Writing ===
The episode shares its title with that of the series' first episode, which was a deliberate decision. Hiddleston stated that the creative team had used the phrase "Glorious Purpose" as a mission statement for the series, adding that every character had been wanting to seek purpose in their lives, which was "in the DNA of the show". Following the conclusion of the first season and during the production of the second, the creative team had understood that the season would end with Loki ascending to the throne. The team also wanted to show Loki being stuck in time loops, with Kevin Wright comparing it to Run Lola Run (1998). Wright also credited the idea of time loops to editor Paul Zucker and stated that the final scene in the episode had deviated from the original script. Eric Martin described the episode's big idea as "taking Loki from a lowercase-g god, to a capital-G God" and felt that it had culminated when Loki decides to become the overseer at the End of Time, as he had sacrificed "the thing he wants most" so that the other people could live with free will. Elaborating upon this notion, Martin went onto compare him to Atlas and wanted to make the journey "difficult" for Loki, as Loki had decided to give up his autonomy in order to safely preserve the multiverse. He attributed the episode's ending to being connected to the ending of the first season, wanting to explore whether Loki or Sylvie's perspective was correct. The creative team held numerous meetings deciding how sequences of Loki destroying the Loom and ascending to the citadel's throne would be written.

The opening scene features Loki time-slipping back to the TVA to speak with Mobius, which paralleled the scene from the series premiere. Hiddleston felt it made sense for Loki to go "right back to the beginning of the story", while Kevin Wright described the scene as having Loki say "goodbye" to Mobius as a result of the "story pick[ing] up" following Loki going into the Temporal Core control room. He also noted that the scene was an inversion from the series' first episode, as Loki was asking Mobius many questions. Meanwhile, Eric Martin stated the scene involved Loki "engaging emotionally" with Mobius. Martin had characterized Mobius as being "in turmoil through all of this", and noted that his devotion to his role in the TVA had resulted in him ignoring other possibilities for his own life until the episode, in which he realizes that he doesn't want to work for the TVA and is willing to "go explore and figure out the opportunities that are out there". He also added that Sylvie would now take responsibilities for her action in a more proactive manner and ultimately "go in a direction". Meanwhile, Wright interpreted Mobius's scene in Ohio as him "overcoming a personal obstacle" and expanded upon Martin's sentiment by saying that Loki had helped provide him with opportunities beyond his TVA life.

During Loki's confrontation with He Who Remains, he recites two verses from T. S. Eliot's poem "Little Gidding" (1942) from his Four Quartets collection: "We die with the dying. We are born with the dead; See, they return, and bring us with them". Hiddleston had enjoyed Eliot's work and felt the poem was very symbolic of Loki's overall character, and had previously referred to his works with the production team throughout the development of the series.

=== Casting ===
The episode stars Tom Hiddleston as Loki, Sophia Di Martino as Sylvie, Gugu Mbatha-Raw as Ravonna Renslayer, Wunmi Mosaku as Hunter B-15, Eugene Cordero as Casey, Rafael Casal as Hunter X-5 / Brad Wolfe, Tara Strong as Miss Minutes, Liz Carr as Judge Gamble, Neil Ellice as Hunter D-90, Jonathan Majors as Victor Timely and He Who Remains, Ke Huy Quan as Ouroboros, and Owen Wilson as Mobius M. Mobius. Also appearing in the episode are Nasri Thompson as a young Victor Timely and Caleb and Blake Johnston-Miller as Don's children.

=== Filming and visual effects ===
Filming took place at Pinewood Studios in the United Kingdom, with Benson and Moorhead directing. Scenes from the episode were amongst the first to be filmed for the season, particularly the scene in which Loki time slips back into the TVA with Mobius. Filming in the "loom room" had occurred for a few days, as the production team had been reshooting variations of Loki's time slipping. The team was also worried about filming scenes with He Who Remains, as they felt it would be "retreading the same ground as season 1". As such, Kevin Wright decided to stop filming and reconvene with the production team, during which Hiddleston had discussed possible ideas with the script supervisor and was able to rework the scene with the writers and Jonathan Majors. Additionally, Hiddleston had also improvised the line "For you, for all of us" as he steps toward the loom, which was an allusion to Thor (2011). While filming the scene in which Loki transports the timelines while ascending the steps, Hiddleston had taken some time to re-watch Loki's prior MCU experiences in order to prepare himself for the scene at the suggestion of directors Benson and Moorhead.

Visual effects for the episode were created by Trixter, Framestore, Rising Sun Pictures, Industrial Light & Magic, Cantina Creative, FuseFX and Lola VFX. The idea for Loki to weave the multiverse into the shape of Yggdrasil had emerged in January 2023, with the post-production team spending seven months working on the scene. Wright had felt the idea had emerged from "playing with this idea of this whole thing being a closed loop" and envisioned Yggdrasil as being the "perfect encapsulation of it". The animated What If...? (2021-2024) team helped create the tree's design, as Marvel Studios had asked that series to include the tree at the end of their season two finale instead of another image of the multiverse they had planned, with What If...? director Bryan Andrews believing the two teams were "informing each other" on its design.

== Reception ==
=== Audience viewership ===
According to Nielsen Media Research which measures the number of minutes watched by United States audiences on television sets, Loki was the most watched original series across streaming services for the week of November 6–12, 2023, with 753 million minutes watched, which was a 34.5% increase from the previous week.

=== Critical response ===
The review aggregator website Rotten Tomatoes reports a 73% approval rating based on 15 reviews.

Collider's Therese Lacson praised the episode for its focus on the titular character rather than being used to set up future Marvel Cinematic Universe projects, as well as both the character growth developed through the episodes' plot and the emotional quality of Hiddleston's performance, concluding that it was a fitting and poetic end to the series.

The A.V. Club's William Hughes gave the episode an "A" rating, praising directors Justin Benson and Aaron Moorhead for not following Marvel's conventional approach to storytelling. He commented on how the episode resolves the series theme exploring systems of control. He praised Hiddleston and Di Martino's final scene along with its score by Natalie Holt.

Gizmodo's Sabina Graves wrote that this season finale expressed Loki's growth through both the series and since the character's introduction to the MCU. However, she was critical of Sylvie's character growth, calling the character's choice to work in fast food as "unbelievable."

Space.com's Fran Ruiz described the finale as "the Marvel Cinematic Universe (MCU) at its best", in contrast to the MCU film The Marvels just released before. Ruiz praised Hiddleston's performance as Loki as "one of the best (if not the best) performers in the MCU."

Vulture's Siddhant Adlakha rated the episode 2 stars out of 5, criticizing its reliance on symbolism and plot mechanics as lacking humanity. He was particularly critical of the episode's use of montage. He also praises Natalie Holt's music both in this episode and both the show's seasons.

The reviews by Collider, The A.V. Club, Space.com and Vulture interpret Loki's shifting of the timelines into a tree-like structure as a reference to Yggdrasil, the Norse tree of life.
