= Ouroboros (Loki) =

- Loki episode
- Promotional poster
- Episode no.: Season 2 Episode 1
- Directed by: Justin Benson; Aaron Moorhead
- Written by: Eric Martin
- Cinematography by: Isaac Bauman
- Editing by: Calum Ross
- Original release date: October 5, 2023
- Running time: 47 minutes

Episode chronology
← Previous "For All Time. Always."	Next → "Breaking Brad"
- Loki season 2

"Ouroboros" is the first episode of the second season and seventh episode overall of the American television series Loki, based on Marvel Comics featuring the character Loki. It sees Loki informing Mobius and Hunter B-15 about the existence of He Who Remains and his variants, while working with those two and Ouroboros to stop his time slipping. The episode is set in the Marvel Cinematic Universe (MCU), sharing continuity with the films of the franchise. It was written by head writer Eric Martin, and directed by Justin Benson and Aaron Moorhead.

Tom Hiddleston reprises his role as Loki from the film series, starring alongside Sophia Di Martino, Wunmi Mosaku (Hunter B-15), Eugene Cordero, Neil Ellice, and Owen Wilson (Mobius) reprising their roles from the first season, alongside Rafael Casal, Kate Dickie, Liz Carr, and Ke Huy Quan (Ouroboros). Development of the second season had begun by November 2020, which was formally confirmed in July 2021. In February 2022, Benson and Moorhead, and Martin were revealed to be directing and writing, respectively, the majority of the season.

"Ouroboros" was released on Disney+ on October 5, 2023. The episode received mostly positive reviews with praise for its visuals, direction, production design, the character of Ouroboros, and the performances of the cast (particularly Hiddleston, Wilson, and Quan).

== Plot ==
After Loki was sent through a time door by Sylvie at the Citadel at the End of Time, he is returned to the Time Variance Authority (TVA) headquarters, where he starts uncontrollably warping across time at the same location. Loki initially arrives in the past, where TVA employees do not know him and attempt to apprehend him. Later in the past, Loki discovers a recording of the TVA's creator, He Who Remains, praising the TVA's Ravonna Renslayer for working with him.

In the present, the TVA is in disarray due to the rapid branching of the Sacred Timeline, caused by Sylvie's killing of He Who Remains. Renslayer's absence leads to Judge Gamble and General Dox assuming leadership positions. Hunter B-15 and Mobius convince Gamble and Dox that TVA employees are all variants taken from branched timelines; Gamble is persuaded to order the TVA to stop eliminating branched timelines. Loki warps into the meeting and exposes He Who Remains's role as the mastermind behind the TVA. Loki warns Mobius of the threat of the many variants of He Who Remains. Dox has many TVA hunters heavily arm themselves for a supposed mission to find Sylvie.

To stop Loki's warping, Loki and Mobius meet TVA technician Ouroboros, who has been working alone for centuries. Ouroboros deduces that Loki is "time slipping", suggesting that it is caused by the timeline branches dangerously overloading the TVA's Temporal Loom. Ouroboros instructs Mobius to approach the Temporal Loom with the Temporal Aura Extractor device to extract Loki from the time stream as Loki "prunes" himself, which would release him from time.

Loki time slips to the future, where the TVA is being evacuated as the Loom goes critical. He tries to find a Timestick to prune himself, briefly encounters Sylvie, and is pruned from behind by someone at the last possible second. In the present, Ouroboros starts sealing off the Temporal Loom to protect the TVA, despite Mobius' protests to wait for Loki. Mobius successfully pulls Loki from the time stream, and the two tumble back into safety from the Temporal Loom, which becomes sealed off. Loki and Mobius set out to find Sylvie.

In a mid-credit scene, Sylvie enters a branched timeline in Broxton, Oklahoma in 1982, and visits a McDonald's restaurant.

== Production ==
=== Development ===
Development on a second season of Loki had begun by November 2020, which was confirmed through a mid-credits scene in the first-season finale, which was released in July 2021. In February 2022, the directing duo Justin Benson and Aaron Moorhead were hired to direct a majority of the episodes for the second season, including the season premiere. Eric Martin, a first-season writer who took over some of series' creator Michael Waldron's duties during production on that season, was set to write all six episodes of the second season. Executive producers for the season include Marvel Studios' Kevin Feige, Stephen Broussard, Louis D'Esposito, Victoria Alonso, Brad Winderbaum, and Kevin R. Wright, alongside star Tom Hiddleston, Benson and Moorhead, Martin, and Waldron. The first episode, titled "Ouroboros", was written by Martin.

=== Writing ===
"Ouroboros" begins directly after the end of the first-season finale, "For All Time. Always.", which originally intended to have Loki at a TVA in a different timeline, with a statue of Kang replacing those of the Time Keepers; this episode establishes Loki was actually at the same TVA but in the past, with the statue being that of He Who Remains instead.

The creatives used the episode to introduce many "timey-wimey" concepts for the season, trying to keep them simple to understand, while still leaving some intrigue for elements that would be paid off later in the season, specifically Loki seeing Sylvie in the future; Wright specifically praised directors Benson and Moorhead for helping to "[straddle] the line between intrigue and confusion" within the episode. With the introduction of Ouroboros, Mobius does not recall having previously met him despite Ouroboros claiming they had. Wright called it "intentionally a bit abstract" and while it would become a larger storyline for the season, noted it brought up "interesting questions" as to who did or did not have their memory wiped at the TVA. The episode's mid-credits scene is set in a branched timeline in Broxton, Oklahoma in 1982. Broxton was chosen as "a tip of the hat to fans", given it was the location of Asgard in the comics in the late 2000s and early 2010s, and "a little bit of a nod to the DNA" of Sylvie, since she is partially based on Sylvie Lushton who was from Broxton in the comics. Broxton was also featured in the episode "Smoke & Mirrors" of the Marvel Television series Agent Carter (2015–2016).

=== Casting ===
The episode stars Tom Hiddleston as Loki, Sophia Di Martino as Sylvie, Wunmi Mosaku as Hunter B-15, Eugene Cordero as Casey, Rafael Casal as Hunter X-5, Kate Dickie as General Dox, Liz Carr as Judge Gamble, Neil Ellice as Hunter D-90, Ke Huy Quan as Ouroboros, and Owen Wilson as Mobius. Gugu Mbatha-Raw and Jonathan Majors have uncredited vocal cameos as Ravonna Renslayer and He Who Remains, respectively.

=== Design ===
Costume designer Christine Wada was able to make the Temporal Core suits modular with removable sleeves so the actors would not get too hot in the suit and would not need to get out of the entire suit between takes.

=== Filming and visual effects ===
Filming took place at Pinewood Studios in the United Kingdom, with Benson and Moorhead directing, and Isaac Bauman serving as cinematographer. Hiddleston physically performed each of the time slips, giving eight to ten different performances for each, which were then stitched together by visual effects to create the full action. He had considered the use of ropes and cables to allow him to have more physicality to move his body in different ways. Visual effects for the episode were created by Framestore, Trixter, FuseFX, Cantina Creative, Industrial Light & Magic, and Lola VFX.

== Marketing ==
After the episode's release, Marvel announced merchandise inspired by the episode as part of its weekly "Marvel Must Haves" promotion for each episode of the series, including apparel, accessories, a poster, and Funko Pops of Loki and Mobius.

== Release ==
The episode was released on Disney+ on October 5, 2023. It was originally scheduled to release on October 6, before moving to its Thursday release schedule following the similar, successful scheduling move for the Star Wars Disney+ series Ahsoka.

== Reception ==
=== Audience viewership ===
Disney+ revealed that "Ouroboros" had 10.9 million views worldwide in its first three days of release. This was the second most-watched season premiere for the streaming service in 2023, behind the third season premiere of The Mandalorian. According to Nielsen Media Research who measure the number of minutes watched by United States audiences on television sets, Loki was the sixth-most watched original series across streaming services for the week of October 2–8, 2023, with 446 million minutes watched, which was a 39% decrease from the week of the season 1 premiere.

=== Critical response ===
The review aggregator website Rotten Tomatoes reports an 82% approval rating, based on 17 reviews.

The A.V. Club's William Hughes gave a "A−" rating for the episode, describing that the show is "still one of the most vibrant, fast-paced, and occasionally over-stuffed corners of the Marvel Cinematic Universe", with an outstanding scene between Mobius, Loki, and Ouroboros. He also criticized the episode for its ambiguous and "surprisingly scant" plot in a show has previously worked best as a character piece.

Vulture's Siddhant Adlakha rated the episode 3 stars out of 5 as it was "entertaining, even if its ending is a bit sudden and jagged". He praised the episode for being "briskly paced [and] skillfully shot", leaning into the show eccentricity and retro-futurism, and incorporating exposition in novel ways. He also highlighted Ke Huy Quan's performance in the episode.

Space.com's Fran Ruiz wrote that the episode is thrilling despite being entirely situated within the TVA and having only a minor action sequence. Ruiz criticized the episode for its excessive exposition but praised acting performances, camerawork and continuation of the show's distinctive production design.

Collider's Therese Lacson wrote that the episode was "a decent return to the story", with Loki's time jumps generating "chaos that can be disorienting at times". Lacson praised Ke Huy Quan's character, and the actor's comedic timing with co-stars Wilson and Hiddleston. She also highlighted Wilson's comedic timing while saving Loki as "particularly funny".

Gizmodo's Sabina Graves criticized the change in writing between show seasons, describing the previous season as "unique boundary-pushing queer genre", and this episode as "generic science fiction aping Doctor Who and Rick and Morty". Graves also expressed surprise at the plot of the show indicating that the women "broke it all and it's up to the men to fix it". In terms of individual performances, Graves highlighted Wunmi Mosaku being "empathetic and powerful" as Hunter B-15.
