= Glorious Purpose =

"Glorious Purpose" may refer to:

- "Glorious Purpose" (Loki season 1), the first-season premiere of the television series Loki
- "Glorious Purpose" (Loki season 2), the second-season finale of the television series Loki
