= Lamentis =

- Loki episode
- Promotional poster
- Episode no.: Season 1 Episode 3
- Directed by: Kate Herron
- Written by: Bisha K. Ali
- Cinematography by: Autumn Durald Arkapaw
- Editing by: Calum Ross
- Original release date: June 23, 2021
- Running time: 42 minutes

Cast
- Susan Gallagher as a Lamentian Homesteader; Alex Van as Patrice; Ben Vandermey as Hudson; Jon Collin Barclay as Hicks

Episode chronology
← Previous "The Variant"	Next → "The Nexus Event"
- Loki season 1

"Lamentis" is the third episode of the first season of the American television series Loki, based on Marvel Comics featuring the character Loki. It follows alternate versions of the character who escape from the mysterious Time Variance Authority (TVA) but get stranded in an apocalyptic event and must work together to survive. The episode is set in the Marvel Cinematic Universe (MCU), sharing continuity with the films of the franchise. It was written by Bisha K. Ali and directed by Kate Herron.

Tom Hiddleston reprises his role as Loki from the film series, while Sophia Di Martino stars as a female version of the character named Sylvie. Gugu Mbatha-Raw and Sasha Lane also star in the episode. Herron joined the series in August 2019. The episode reveals that Loki is bisexual in the MCU like he is in the comics, which Herron felt was important to acknowledge in the series. Filming took place at Pinewood Atlanta Studios, with location filming in the Atlanta metropolitan area.

"Lamentis" was released on Disney+ on June 23, 2021. Critics praised the interactions between Hiddleston and Di Martino and pointed out similarities between the episode and the series Doctor Who, though they were mixed on the series' decision to veer away from the larger narrative; some appreciated the increased focus on characterization while others felt it could impact in the series' overall pacing. The confirmation that Loki is bisexual was also highlighted in critic and fan discussions of the episode.

== Plot ==
Before Loki and the Time Variance Authority (TVA) arrive in 2050 Alabama to apprehend her, the Variant, also known as Sylvie, projects an emulated memory into her captive TVA agent, Hunter C-20, to collect information about the location of the Time-Keepers, the TVA's supposed creators. Sylvie and Loki arrive at the TVA from Alabama. She attempts to visit the Time-Keepers while he tries to apprehend her. However, TVA Judge Ravonna Renslayer appears and attacks them both. Loki uses a TemPad to teleport himself and Sylvie away.

They arrive at 2077 Lamentis-1, a moon that is about to be crushed by a planet, but neither can escape due to the TemPad having run out of power. They reluctantly agree to work together because Loki has magically hidden the TemPad while only Sylvie knows how to recharge it. The two surreptitiously travel on a train bound for the ark, an evacuation spaceship, intending to use it to recharge the TemPad. Despite initial hostility, the two slowly begin to bond and compare life experiences. However, Loki gets drunk and draws attention to himself, leading to guards fighting him and Sylvie. She follows him when he is thrown off the train, and both discover that the TemPad was broken as a result. The two change their plan, traveling on foot in hopes of commandeering the ark to escape.

During the journey, Sylvie tells Loki that the TVA employees are all variants. Loki realizes that the TVA employees do not know this, as he was previously told that they were creations of the Time-Keepers. Loki and Sylvie fight their way through guards while avoiding a meteor shower trying to board the ark, but it is destroyed by a meteor before they can board it, leaving them stranded.

== Production ==
=== Development ===
By September 2018, Marvel Studios was developing a limited series starring Tom Hiddleston's Loki from the Marvel Cinematic Universe (MCU) films. Loki was confirmed to be in development by Disney CEO Bob Iger in November. Kate Herron was hired to direct the series in August 2019. Herron and head writer Michael Waldron executive produce alongside Hiddleston and Marvel Studios' Kevin Feige, Louis D'Esposito, Victoria Alonso, and Stephen Broussard. The third episode, titled "Lamentis", was written by Bisha K. Ali, who was inspired by the films Before Sunrise (1995) and Children of Men (2006).

=== Writing ===
Ali was tasked with much of the series world-building in the episode, and was not given any predetermined guidance or notes from Marvel on what they wanted. She chose the name Lamentis since she was "a deeply depressing person", finding "something poignant and beautiful about lamenting something". Discussing the Variant using the alias "Sylvie", Sophia Di Martino said while the character was inspired by Sylvie Lushton / Enchantress and Lady Loki from Marvel Comics, she is a different person with a different backstory from those characters as well as Hiddleston's Loki. "Lamentis" establishes that Loki and Sylvie are bisexual. Herron, who is also bisexual, said acknowledging this was very important to her since this is part of "who he is and who I am" and called it a "small step". She continued that the moment did not want to "feel like we were just wedging something in" and the scene where it occurred was "the right place for that conversation to happen". This is the only time in the series this is acknowledged, with Herron hoping it would "pave the way for deeper exploration". Di Martino stated she and Hiddleston tried to make the moment like a "natural conversation between two acquaintances" without giving the statement "too much weight", while still understanding the importance of what the moment would be.

Loki's metaphor that "love is a dagger" was written "really, really quick" by Waldron when he was revising the episode. Since Loki was drunk in the moment, that "freed [Waldron] up" to not think too hard about it, and he also knew it did not need to make the most sense since, much like Loki's other metaphors, it "almost works". Hiddleston added that the metaphor was representative of Loki's experience with love to that point, as it has been "some sort of illusion that he has trusted and been let down by". He continued that Loki believed he had created something profound, even though it was not, and was an opportunity for Sylvie to "burst the bubble of Loki's pomposity".

=== Casting ===
The episode stars Tom Hiddleston as Loki, Sophia Di Martino as Sylvie, Gugu Mbatha-Raw as Ravonna Renslayer, and Sasha Lane as Hunter C-20. Also appearing in the episode are Susan Gallagher as a Lamentian homesteader, Alex Van as Patrice, Ben Vandermey as Private Hudson, and Jon Collin Barclay as Corporal Hicks.

=== Design ===
Designing the Lamentis city of Sharoo was a challenge for production designer Kasra Farahani as he wanted to distinguish it from past alien worlds seen in the MCU. He knew that it had to "feel gritty, industrial and working-class because it is a mining moon [and was] not a posh place". The resulting design was "this blocky ziggurat language as if the buildings were all 3D printed out of concrete". Black-light paint was used on the buildings to create a "labyrinth strike pattern", which created an illusion as if parts of the building were flowing. The set was built 16 feet (4.9 m) high, with CGI used to extend it higher.

=== Filming and visual effects ===
Director Kate Herron lit this scene with bisexual lighting. The moment, which revealed Loki and Sylvie were bisexual, was widely discussed.

Filming took place at Pinewood Atlanta Studios in Atlanta, Georgia, with Herron directing, and Autumn Durald Arkapaw serving as cinematographer. Location filming took place in the Atlanta metropolitan area, including at a quarry in northern Georgia that became the Lamentis-1 mining town. The scene on the train when Loki and Sylvie discuss their love life and mention their bisexuality was shot with a "soft glow of purple lighting" with the various characters in the scene wearing blue in their costumes; purple, blue, and pink are the colors that represent bisexuality and its flag. Hiddleston improvised Loki breaking a glass and saying "Another!" as a reference to a scene in Thor (2011) with Thor.

The final sequence was presented as a single-take shot, with moments used to hide approximately 8 to 9 edit cuts. Di Martino revealed it was shot over a few nights, with each segment of the sequence taking two-to-three takes each. Herron decided to feature a single-take for that sequence in order for the audience to feel like they were with the characters in that moment, as well as to heighten the horror and terror of the apocalypse. Arkapaw explained that the script did not explain much for the moment, with the various creatives devising what the sequence would entail. Early discussions had considered including a motorcycle for Loki and Sylvie to get on and off, but Arkapaw said it made the sequence too "complex" and took away from the "humanistic" feel. Children of Men (2006) was a reference for the sequence as Herron hoped to evoke "that feeling" of being with the characters the entire time, as were other one shot sequences, particularly the one in the first season of True Detective which was shot by Arkapaw's husband, Adam. John Wick was also an inspiration. A Steadicam was used when it came time to film, after Arkapaw had considered filming it handheld. She used Panavision 35mm and 40mm anamorphic lenses to frame both characters in the shot while still seeing the planet around them. These lenses did not make the background "compressed" and allowed her to "come in close on someone's face" if needed.

Visual effects for the episode were created by Digital Domain, Lola, FuseFX, Rodeo FX, Method Studios, Luma Pictures, Cantina Creative, Crafty Apes, and Rise.

=== Music ===
"Demons" by Hayley Kiyoko and "Dark Moon" by Bonnie Guitar are featured in the episode. Marvel approached Norwegian author Erlend O. Nødtvedt and musician Benedicte Maurseth to create the Asgardian drinking song sung by Loki in the episode. The song, titled "Jeg saler min ganger", was composed as a traditional folk song, with Nødtvedt and Maurseth creating four verses despite only one being used in the episode; the full song, known as "Very Full", is available on the series' soundtrack for the first three episodes. Hannah Shaw-Williams of Screen Rant thought while the chorus was "cheerful and upbeat", the verse heard in the episode was "far more melancholy" with poignant lyrics that "captures Loki's self-imposed isolation and loneliness". Series composer Natalie Holt helped arrange the track. She explained that Hiddleston had originally sung the song a cappella when the scene was first shot, and the moment had felt "a bit dead" since no one was engaging with him. Holt then suggested to Herron and co-executive producer Kevin Wright that the moment should have music coming from train passengers with instruments, arranging the track first on violin before sending it to the Norwegian musicians who worked on the score. Following this, the scene was reshot with a woman playing an alien violin and more passengers drinking and singing with Hiddleston.

For the week ending July 17, 2021, "Very Full" placed 10th on Billboard's World Digital Song Sales chart, with 500 downloads in the week ending July 8, according to MRC Data. After its appearance in the episode, "Demons" placed fourth on Billboard's Top TV Songs chart in partnership with Tunefind for June 2021. The song had 1.1 million U.S. on-demand streams and 2,000 downloads, according to MRC Data.

== Marketing ==
After the episode's release, Marvel announced merchandise inspired by the episode as part of its weekly "Marvel Must Haves" promotion for each episode of the series, including apparel, accessories, and a Sylvie Funko Pop, Hot Toys Cosbaby, and Marvel Legends figure. Marvel also released a promotional poster for "Lamentis", which featured Loki's "love is a dagger" metaphor from the episode.

== Release ==
"Lamentis" was released on Disney+ on June 23, 2021. The episode, along with the rest of Loki's first season, was released on Ultra HD Blu-ray and Blu-ray on September 26, 2023.

== Reception ==
=== Audience viewership ===
Nielsen Media Research, who measure the number of minutes watched by United States audiences on television sets, listed Loki as the most-watched original streaming series for the week of June 21 to 27, 2021. 713 million minutes were viewed across the available first three episodes, which was a 19.5% decrease from the previous week.

=== Critical response ===
The review aggregator website Rotten Tomatoes reported an 84% approval rating with an average score of 7.6/10 based on 37 reviews. The site's critical consensus reads, "The charming Sophia Di Martino proves a worthy variant in "Lamentis," an apocalyptic pit stop that wears its Whovian influences on its tricky sleeves—for better and worse."

Reviewing "Lamentis" for Rolling Stone, Alan Sepinwall said a series consisting of six episodes like this should not have time to veer away from its main narrative to further explore the characters. Yet, the episode "recognizes that if we don't understand who Sylvie is, and the ways in which she is and is not like her male counterpart, then none of her endgame really matters. The detour is as crucial as—if not more crucial than—everything that happened before," calling it "entertaining as Hel". Sepinwall also believed the episode was "an excellent example of the ways in which these new MCU shows can do things differently from the films while still feeling like part of the same broader story". Giving the episode a "B−", Caroline Siede of The A.V. Club said the episode was "bursting with style and full of promising ideas", yet noted while one could easily describe this episode of Loki from various aspects that appeared or occurred, it still felt like "half an episode" that "never quite kicks into high gear" or had any real stakes. Still, "even a 'filler' episode like this one is still very watchable", with Siede pointing out the various world-building that occurred and the "solid" fighting sequences, but wished "Lamentis" had spent more time exploring Sylvie's history and wondered if the episode would "wind up playing better in retrospect once we know where the season is going".

Siddhant Adlakha at IGN said the episode "hammers home just how much this series is the rare Marvel entry with any real visual panache. It is, however, often hampered, and ends up in service of a story that jogs in place and concludes rather abruptly." Adlakha also felt some of the dialogue was "especially quippy and Marvel-esque, in [a] way that felt novel" with Robert Downey Jr. in Iron Man (2008), "but now feels like a stale substitute for characterization". He also felt Loki should "let loose" and "luxuriate in the infinite chaos just outside its frame", wishing "Marvel's production machine [would] get out of [the creative's] way and let them tell an immersive story, where the characters aren't defined by a visual and narrative formula, but by possibility"; Adlakha gave "Lamentis" a 7 out of 10.

Many commentators felt the episode had similarities to Doctor Who, while Sepinwall described "Lamentis" as an "unlikely but appealing cross-pollination" of that series and the film Before Sunrise (1995). The chemistry between Hiddleston and Di Martino in the episode was also widely praised.

=== Analysis ===
Commentators discussed the reveal of the Variant taking on the moniker of "Sylvie". Sepinwall felt this seemed more like "the MCU's habit of combining aspects of comics characters... [rather] than a bait-and-switch", noting how Hiddleston and Di Martino were "clearly playing different aspects of the same character". Sam Barsanti of The A.V. Club believed it was "very possible" Sylvie was just a different version of Loki from a different timeline, since there was a history in comic book films of combining names and descriptions of multiple characters "just for the sake of not having to invent a whole new thing". Conversely, since Barsanti pointed out that Sylvie had yet to say she was a Loki and asks not to be called such, she could still end up being the MCU's Enchantress. Yahoo Entertainment's Ethan Alter believed Sylvie would ultimately be a fusion of Lady Loki and Enchantress, which had been a prevalent fan theory.

Many commentators also spoke about the reveal that Loki was bisexual. Siddhant Adlakha at IGN said, "While a far cry from any overt display of sexuality... it's a nice albeit fleeting way for Disney to finally pull this trigger" adding Loki was most likely Disney's most high-profile queer character. Saloni Gajjar writing for The A.V. Club called the reveal "a major deal for MCU fans" but did not find it surprising, since Loki in the comics is pansexual and gender fluid. She said that, in addition to Phastos being gay in Eternals (2021) and Valkyrie's bisexuality being explored in Thor: Love and Thunder (2022), Marvel Studios was "clearly trying to overcome the flak for being late to the party with its dismal LGBTQ+ representation". Doctor Who writer Russell T Davies, however, criticized the scene which reveals Loki as bisexual as a "feeble gesture towards the vital politics and the stories that should be told".

Variety's Adam B. Vary noted how Loki was Marvel Studios' first queer character and felt the reveal, which happened during Pride Month, was the studio recognizing that the "casual revelation" would hold significant meaning for many LGBT fans. However, Vary was discouraged that the acknowledgment was being celebrated as a milestone for queer representation since other superhero media had already embraced that community such as with multiple characters in DC Comics television series including the Arrowverse. Also, Marvel Television's Jessica Jones had lesbian and trans characters. Vary concluded that it was a "significant step forward for LGBTQIA representation" in the MCU, but it remained to be seen if Loki would be able to "express same-sex love or sexual attraction" like heterosexual couples have done in the franchise. Matt Patches and Susana Polo wrote for Polygon that the moment seemed "weighty" compared to Disney's previous announcements touting a gay character in a Walt Disney Animation Studios or Pixar film that amounted to a single shot or line of dialogue, but they cautioned that since Loki had yet to be seen in any relationship in the MCU, the concept of the "sexless queer character" applied, which is "as much a set-piece of homophobic propaganda as the villainous queer character". Fans celebrated the moment as well as "the artistry with which it was executed".

=== Accolades ===
At the 2022 Visual Effects Society Awards, Jesse Lewis-Evans, Luke Avery, Autumn Durald Arkapaw, and Scott Inkster were nominated for Outstanding Virtual Cinematography in a CG Project for the "Race to the Ark" sequence, and Paul Chapman, Tom Truscott, Biagio Figliuzzi, and Attila Szalma were nominated for Outstanding Compositing and Lighting in an Episode for the "Shuroo City Destruction" sequence. Arkapaw was nominated for Outstanding Cinematography for a Single-Camera Series (One Hour) at the 74th Primetime Creative Arts Emmy Awards.
