= The Nexus Event =

- Loki episode
- Promotional poster
- Episode no.: Season 1 Episode 4
- Directed by: Kate Herron
- Written by: Eric Martin
- Cinematography by: Autumn Durald Arkapaw
- Editing by: Emma McCleave
- Original release date: June 30, 2021
- Running time: 48 minutes

Cast
- Richard E. Grant as Classic Loki; Jack Veal as Kid Loki; DeObia Oparei as Boastful Loki; Cailey Fleming as Kid Sylvie

Episode chronology
← Previous "Lamentis"	Next → "Journey into Mystery"
- Loki season 1

"The Nexus Event" is the fourth episode of the first season of the American television series Loki, based on Marvel Comics featuring the character Loki. It follows alternate versions of the character who are arrested by the mysterious Time Variance Authority (TVA) and brought before the organization's creators, the Time-Keepers. The episode is set in the Marvel Cinematic Universe (MCU), sharing continuity with the films of the franchise. It was written by Eric Martin and directed by Kate Herron.

Tom Hiddleston reprises his role as Loki from the film series, while Sophia Di Martino stars as a female version of the character named Sylvie. Gugu Mbatha-Raw, Wunmi Mosaku, Sasha Lane, and Owen Wilson also star in the episode. Herron joined the series in August 2019. Filming took place at Pinewood Atlanta Studios, with location filming in the Atlanta metropolitan area.

"The Nexus Event" was released on Disney+ on June 30, 2021. Critics praised the character interactions, writing, twist ending, and mid-credits scene.

== Plot ==
Many years earlier, Hunter Ravonna Renslayer of the Time Variance Authority (TVA) arrests a young Sylvie for "crimes against the Sacred Timeline" and erases her timeline from existence, but Sylvie steals Renslayer's TemPad during her trial and escapes into the timeline.

In the present, TVA agent Mobius M. Mobius asks Renslayer to see Hunter C-20, but Renslayer claims C-20 died from a mental breakdown caused by Sylvie's enchantment. In 2077, amidst the destruction of the moon Lamentis-1, a stranded Sylvie and Loki form a romantic connection. This creates a unique branched timeline, a "Nexus Event" perpendicular to the Sacred Timeline, which alerts the TVA who come to rescue and arrest the pair.

Returning to headquarters, Mobius has Loki imprisoned in a time loop of a moment from his past on Asgard with Sif, wherein she attacks him and says he will always be alone. Mobius pulls Loki out to interrogate him about how the Nexus Event occurred, then mocks Loki's narcissism and falling in love with Sylvie. After Loki reveals that the TVA employees are variants, Mobius sends him back into the time loop. Mobius later steals Renslayer's TemPad, on which he finds a recording of her interviewing a mentally sound C-20, who confirms Loki's statement. Meanwhile, a distraught Hunter B-15 brings Sylvie to 2050 Alabama and asks the latter to show her memories of her past life, having glimpsed them when Sylvie previously enchanted her, learning her own true variant nature in the process.

Mobius frees Loki, but they are confronted by Renslayer and TVA troopers. Mobius acknowledges his betrayal and variant status, leading to Renslayer ordering him to be "pruned," seemingly killing him. Renslayer takes Loki and Sylvie to the Time-Keepers, during which Sylvie asks Renslayer why she was first arrested, though Renslayer claims not to remember. The Time-Keepers order Loki and Sylvie to be deleted, but B-15 frees the pair of their restraints. Loki and Sylvie team up to fight and defeat Renslayer and the Time-Keepers' guards, though B-15 is knocked unconscious. Sylvie beheads a Time-Keeper, only to learn they are all androids. As Loki attempts to tell Sylvie about his feelings, Renslayer recovers and prunes him. Angered, Sylvie overpowers her and demands the truth about the TVA.

In a mid-credits scene, Loki awakens in another dimension and meets four other Loki variants, who ask him to join them in order to survive.

== Production ==
=== Development ===
By September 2018, Marvel Studios was developing a limited series starring Tom Hiddleston's Loki from the Marvel Cinematic Universe (MCU) films. Loki was confirmed to be in development by Disney CEO Bob Iger in November. Kate Herron was hired to direct the series in August 2019. Herron and head writer Michael Waldron executive produce alongside Hiddleston and Marvel Studios' Kevin Feige, Louis D'Esposito, Victoria Alonso, and Stephen Broussard. The fourth episode, titled "The Nexus Event", was written by Eric Martin.

=== Writing ===
Featuring Loki's first "real love story" was part of Waldron's initial pitch for Loki, and he felt it was right for the character that this would be between him and an alternate version of himself, female variant Sylvie. Herron added that "just from an identity perspective, it was interesting to dig into" the two forming a relationship and she was careful to give it "the space to breathe and digging into it in a way that felt earned". Their relationship was one of the aspects of the series that Herron decided to enhance during the COVID-19 pandemic production shutdown. The moment that the two characters share on Lamentis-1 in which they wonder if there is more to their friendship creates a "straight-up and down branch" on the Sacred Timeline, which Waldron said was "exactly the sort of thing that would terrify" the Time Variance Authority (TVA).

Hunter B-15 sees memories of her former life in the episode, but what she sees is not revealed to the audience and actress Wunmi Mosaku was also unaware of the specifics of what the character was seeing when filming the scene. Herron felt that not showing her memories allowed "a character that thought they had power and realizes they have no power... [to have] some power in that scenario". Loki also sees a memory of his life on Asgard in the episode, being trapped in a time loop with Sif attacking him over stealing a lock of her hair; this was based on a Norse myth.

Owen Wilson felt with Mobius M. Mobius learning he is a variant, he starts having the same questions Loki did upon his arrival at the TVA, of "What is this organization? And is it something that is worthy of his devotion?" Gugu Mbatha-Raw stated that Ravonna Renslayer felt betrayed by Mobius, her only friend, when he swaps their TemPads, and thus betrays him by having him pruned. Wilson added that Renslayer's betrayal was "pretty shocking", but added to the "hall of mirrors within the whole series, that people aren't quite who they seem to be".

The mid-credits scene in which Loki wakes up surrounded by variants of himself was originally intended to take place the end of the episode, immediately after Loki is pruned. Herron said that the scene was moved to the mid-credits in post-production so the audience would "really feel like Loki has died", and Herron felt it would not make sense for the scene to come before the credits.

=== Casting ===
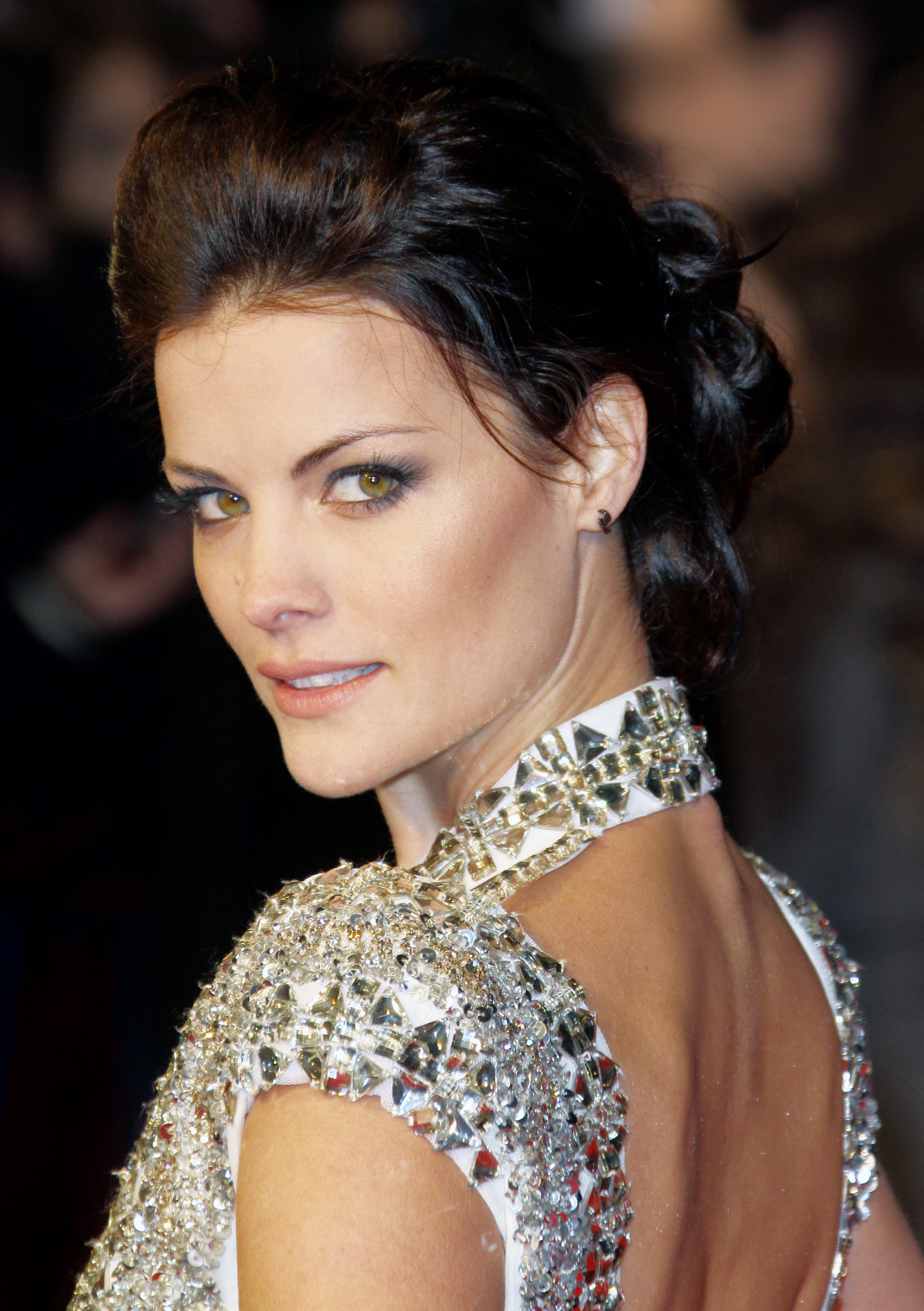
Jaimie Alexander makes an uncredited cameo appearance as Sif in the episode, reprising her role from past MCU films

The episode stars Tom Hiddleston as Loki, Sophia Di Martino as Sylvie, Gugu Mbatha-Raw as Ravonna Renslayer, Wunmi Mosaku as Hunter B-15, Sasha Lane as Hunter C-20, and Owen Wilson as Mobius M. Mobius. Also appearing in the episode are Richard E. Grant as Classic Loki, Jack Veal as Kid Loki, Deobia Oparei as Boastful Loki, and Cailey Fleming as Kid Sylvie. Jaimie Alexander makes an uncredited cameo appearance as Sif, while Jonathan Majors voices the Time-Keepers, also uncredited.

=== Design ===
Creating the Asgard set was a challenge for production designer Kasra Farahani because he wanted to find a way to make it recognizable as it had appeared in previous MCU media, while still being unique to the series and fitting with the other new, original sets.

=== Filming and visual effects ===
Filming took place at Pinewood Atlanta Studios in Atlanta, Georgia, with Herron directing, and Autumn Durald Arkapaw serving as cinematographer. Location filming took place in the Atlanta metropolitan area. Visual effects for the episode were created by Method Studios, Rise FX, FuseFX, Cantina Creative, Luma Pictures, Digital Domain, Crafty Apes, Industrial Light & Magic, and Rodeo FX.

=== Music ===
Composer Natalie Holt felt it was "really hard to get the right tone" for the scene of Loki and Sylvie sharing their connection that creates the nexus event. She explained, "If it was too subtle, it didn't play right. I tried a much more understated version of it and then I just did this bombastic, love-in-space, the world is ending sound, just this huge, sweeping love moment and it just seemed to work with whatever it is that they brought to the table." For the Time-Keepers scene, Holt played around with the uneasiness and "uncanny valley feeling" in her music.

Camille Saint-Saëns' "The Swan", as performed by theremin player Clara Rockmore and her sister, pianist Nadia Reisenberg, is featured in the episode; the theremin was one of the instruments Herron and Holt were drawn to for the score of the series. "If You Love Me (Really Love Me)" by Brenda Lee is also featured during the credits of the episode.

== Marketing ==
After the episode's release, Marvel announced merchandise inspired by the episode as part of its weekly "Marvel Must Haves" promotion for each episode of the series, including apparel, such as T-shirts based on the TVA's "classic productivity posters", and accessories. Marvel also released a promotional poster for "The Nexus Event" featuring the Time-Keepers and Miss Minutes, and encouraging fans not to spoil the episode's surprises.

== Release ==
"The Nexus Event" was released on Disney+ on June 30, 2021. The episode, along with the rest of Loki's first season, was released on Ultra HD Blu-ray and Blu-ray on September 26, 2023, with one of its included deleted scenes from this episode.

== Reception ==
=== Audience viewership ===
Nielsen Media Research, who measure the number of minutes watched by United States audiences on television sets, listed Loki as the most-watched original streaming series for the week of June 28 to July 4, 2021. 813 million minutes were viewed across the available first four episodes, which was an increase of 100 million from the previous week.

=== Critical response ===
The review aggregator website Rotten Tomatoes reported an 88% approval rating with an average score of 7.8/10 based on 33 reviews. The site's critical consensus reads, "Tom Hiddleston and Sophia Di Martino's hard-won chemistry helps anchor "The Nexus Event", a shocking installment that reshuffles the board while teasing exciting new variables for the God of Mischief."

Alan Sepinwall of Rolling Stone stated the episode was "a thrilling, poignant hour of TV that offered that familiar, reassuring sensation of making everything that came before feel more important as a result of it". Speaking to the apparent demise of Mobius, Sepinwall did not believe Wilson would be finished on the show, but felt if he was, "the show really did get great value out of Wilson, not only in the banter with Hiddleston, but in the way that he helped put a human and relatable face on the shows larger questions about identity and free will". He also enjoyed all the "comedic and dramatic possibilities" that the various Loki variants in the mid-credits scene presented and concluded that "Loki is doing exactly what a serialized drama should be doing, and it's firing on all cylinders". Giving the episode a "B", Caroline Siede at The A.V. Club said "only some top-notch acting and an intriguing mid-credits tease buoys this episode from a placeholder to something more tantalizing". She felt the episode featured "a lot of sitting around and waiting for characters to figure out stuff we already know", believing an additional disconnect was that the series "wants to be a show full of twists, turns, and shocking reveals, but the writing isn't clever enough to actually pull off that sense of mischievous fun". Additionally, Siede called Loki's love for Sylvie "a truly wild emotional anchor" and stated the mid-credits scene was "a tantalizing tease that Loki might finally expand its world into something less confined". Adam B. Vary and Mónica Marie Zorrilla of Variety stated "The Nexus Event" "goes positively mad with game-changing plot twists".

IGN's Siddhant Adlakha was more critical of the episode, giving it a 5 out of 10. He felt "The Nexus Event" was "composed of a few interesting moments and scenes, little character beats and negotiations that feel like they ought to add up to something more compelling" and believed the series was "jogging in place", losing "some of the urgency and excitement teased" in past episodes. Adlakha took issue with the indication that the sacred timeline being thrown into chaos was reduced to "a mere distraction dealt with off-screen", which created "a strange deflation of the show's own mechanics and the way it presented this enormous cliffhanger". Conversely, he praised Holt's score, calling it "rousing and strange" and called the mid-credits scene "the first time the show has moved forward in any fun or meaningful way in several weeks".

=== Accolades ===
Eric Martin, Kate Herron, and Michael Waldron were nominated for Best Dramatic Presentation, Short Form at the 2022 Hugo Awards.
