= 1893 (Loki) =

- Loki episode
- Promotional poster
- Episode no.: Season 2 Episode 3
- Directed by: Kasra Farahani
- Story by: Eric Martin
- Teleplay by: Eric Martin; Kasra Farahani; Jason O'Leary
- Cinematography by: Isaac Bauman
- Editing by: Emma McCleave
- Original release date: October 19, 2023
- Running time: 55 minutes

Cast
- Ross Hatt as Guy Pennyman III; Nasri Thompson as Young Victor Timely

Episode chronology
← Previous "Breaking Brad"	Next → "Heart of the TVA"
- Loki season 2

"1893" is the third episode of the second season and ninth episode overall of the American television series Loki, based on Marvel Comics featuring the character Loki. It sees Loki working with Mobius M. Mobius, Hunter B-15, and other members of the Time Variance Authority (TVA) to travel to 1893 in search of Ravonna Renslayer and Miss Minutes. There they happen upon a variant of He Who Remains, Victor Timely. The episode is set in the Marvel Cinematic Universe (MCU), sharing continuity with the films of the franchise. Its teleplay was written by head writer Eric Martin and the writing team of Kasra Farahani and Jason O'Leary, from a story by Martin, and directed by Farahani.

Tom Hiddleston reprises his role as Loki from the film series, starring alongside Sophia Di Martino, Gugu Mbatha-Raw (Renslayer), Wunmi Mosaku (Hunter B-15), Eugene Cordero, Tara Strong (Miss Minutes), Jonathan Majors (He Who Remains / Timely), and Owen Wilson (Mobius) reprising their roles from the first season, alongside Richard Dixon and Ke Huy Quan. Development of the second season had begun by November 2020, which was formally confirmed in July 2021. In February 2022, Martin was revealed to be writing the majority of the season, while Farahani was revealed to be directing in the season in June 2023.

"1893" was released on Disney+ on October 19, 2023. The episode received positive reviews from critics for its production design, music, and performances (particularly those of Majors and Strong), but received some criticism for its writing.

== Plot ==
In TVA headquarters, Ouroboros finds that the branched timelines destroyed by General Dox are growing again, threatening to overload the Temporal Loom and destroy the TVA. Only artificial intelligence Miss Minutes or TVA creator He Who Remains' temporal aura can grant access to fix the Loom.

Loki and Mobius know that Miss Minutes was working with Ravonna Renslayer, so they track her TemPad on a branched timeline to Chicago, first to 1868, then in 1893 at the Chicago World's Fair. There, they see Victor Timely, a variant of He Who Remains, presenting his Loom Prototype. (Note: As depicted in the post-credits scene of Ant-Man and the Wasp: Quantumania (2023)) Before his demise, He Who Remains had arranged for Miss Minutes and Renslayer to visit 1868, where they would secretly drop the TVA Handbook for a young Timely to find; but Loki and Mobius do not discover this. By 1893, Timely had developed real prototypes of TVA devices, as well as fake inventions as scams for money.

Timely then has four groups chasing after him: a Robber Baron and his allies from the branched timeline, who want revenge for Timely scamming the Baron; Loki and Mobius, who need Timely's temporal aura to fix the Loom; Renslayer and Miss Minutes, who want Timely to take his variant's place leading the TVA with them at his side, and Sylvie, who wants to kill Timely to prevent his rise to power.

Loki stops Sylvie from killing Timely, then uses magic to scare off the Baron while Timely escapes with Renslayer and Miss Minutes. Timely realizes that Renslayer gave him the TVA Handbook and thanks her for it, but then he abandons her for proposing a partnership with him. Reaching Timely's laboratory in Wisconsin, Miss Minutes, who had been jealous of Renslayer receiving Timely's attention, expresses a wish for an actual body and proclaims romantic love for Timely, leading to Timely turning her off.

Renslayer, Loki, Mobius, and Sylvie catch up with Timely, with Sylvie gaining control. Timely begs for his life, denying that he will become He Who Remains and saying that he can make his own choices. Sylvie spares Timely and allows Loki to take him back to the TVA. Sylvie then sends Renslayer to the Citadel at the End of Time. Renslayer brings Miss Minutes along and reactivates her; they see He Who Remains' corpse. Miss Minutes says she knows a secret about Renslayer that would anger her.

== Production ==
=== Development ===
Development on a second season of Loki had begun by November 2020, which was confirmed through a mid-credits scene in the first-season finale, which was released in July 2021. In February 2022, Eric Martin, a first-season writer who took over some of series' creator Michael Waldron's duties during production on that season, was set to write all six episodes of the second season. Series' production designer Kasra Farahani was revealed as a director in the season in June 2023, directing the third episode in addition to co-writing it. Executive producers for the season include Marvel Studios' Kevin Feige, Stephen Broussard, Louis D'Esposito, Victoria Alonso, Brad Winderbaum, and Kevin R. Wright, alongside star Tom Hiddleston, Justin Benson and Aaron Moorhead, Martin, and Waldron. The third episode, titled "1893", had the teleplay written by Martin and the writing team of Farahani and Jason O'Leary, from a story by Martin, and was released on Disney+ on October 19, 2023.

Farahani was asked to be part of the writers' room and eventually direct the episode by Wright and Martin after they saw his overall involvement on the season. Farahani said that he was only going to be able to direct whichever episode was filmed last because by that time the design work would be done.

=== Writing ===
Farahani said the scene of Loki finding a diorama with statues at the Chicago World's Fair of Thor, Odin, and Balder the Brave was partially meant as a joke in which the audiences expect to see Loki's statue alongside Thor and Odin's only to see Balder's. The scene was also written as a way to reintroduce his relationship with Asgard to both the character and the audience and how "Loki has the potential to do massive, powerful, hugely impactful things on the scale that only a God can". He also said the scene was meant to acknowledge how dioramas at the World's Fair could come off as "pretty reductive" and racially insensitive by having Loki comment on it. Introducing Victory Timely in this episode allowed for "a lot of cool character drama to play with", particularly if both Loki and Sylvie could trust him. Farahani described Miss Minutes and Ravonna Renslayer's relationship in the episode as "rough-and-tumble", being allies to each other out of convenience with "no actual goodwill between them". Their "tacit truce" conversation at the end of the episode was done at the Citadel at the End of time so it could be "in the presence of He Who Remains, who's the architect of [their] animosity in the first place".

=== Casting ===
The episode stars Tom Hiddleston as Loki, Sophia Di Martino as Sylvie, Gugu Mbatha-Raw as Ravonna Renslayer, Wunmi Mosaku as Hunter B-15, Eugene Cordero as Casey, Tara Strong as Miss Minutes, Richard Dixon as Robber Baron, Jonathan Majors as Victor Timely and He Who Remains, Ke Huy Quan as Ouroboros "O. B.", and Owen Wilson as Mobius M. Mobius. Also starring are Ross Hatt as Guy Pennyman III and Nasri Thompson as a young Victor Timely. Series composer Natalie Holt makes a cameo as a musician.

=== Design ===
Wright believed the set for the World's Fair was larger than the one built for Lamentis in the first season, which Faharani noted forced the team to be careful and avoid going over budget while building it, mainly due to being a one-episode set. Faharani revealed that he always tries to create sets in his production design that suggest camera angles so that the cinematographer and director are presented with how they want to shoot a scene. Due to that process, Faharani was happy to get an episode with sets that he could guarantee would be filmed how he wanted. Returning to the Citadel at the End of Time set at the end of the episode, Farahani wanted to reflect how time has begun to affect it since the events at the end of the first season, with the set shown in a decaying state along with the rotting corpse of He Who Remains.

=== Filming and visual effects ===
Filming took place at Pinewood Studios in the United Kingdom, with Farahani directing and Isaac Bauman as cinematographer. The Prestige (2006) was one of many references Farahani and Bauman pulled from for the look of the episode, with Wright stating the goal was to make the episode "feel as naturalistic as possible" and avoid "a kitschy look and feel or a skewed version of what those eras might've been" that can happen when adapting past periods in time-travel media. The pair decided to use many wide shots in the episode to take advantage of most sets being fully intact, 360-degree sets. Bauman shot the episode with longer focal lengths on his telephoto lenses to produce a background that was "more swirly and distorted" with less clean edges; this was meant to mimic the "blurry and smudgy and kind of desaturated" photography look of the era. Visual effects for the episode were created by Industrial Light & Magic, Yannix, SDFX Studios, Rising Sun Pictures, FuseFX, Trixter, Framestore, and Cantina Creative.

=== Music ===
The episode features a ragtime piano version of the Marvel Studios fanfare.

== Marketing ==
After the episode's release, Marvel announced merchandise inspired by the episode as part of its weekly "Marvel Must Haves" promotion for each episode of the series, including apparel, a poster, and Funko Pops for Sylvie, Renslayer with Miss Minutes, and Victor Timely.

== Reception ==
=== Audience viewership ===
According to Nielsen Media Research which measures the number of minutes watched by United States audiences on television sets, Loki was the fifth-most watched original series across streaming services for the week of October 16–22, 2023, with 525 million minutes watched, which was a 10.7% decrease from the previous week.

=== Critical response ===
The review aggregator website Rotten Tomatoes reports an 80% approval rating, based on 10 reviews.

Therese Lacson at Collider said the episode "does a lot of the heavy lifting for the rest of the season". She felt the introduction of Timely was "another sharp shift" from Majors, and liked the fact that each of his Kang variants had distinct personalities. Calling Miss Minutes' reactions to Renslayer taking a liking to Timely "a highlight of the episode", Lacson called it "delightful to see just how petty and selfish the little AI clock can be", and believed Miss Minutes would be "a key player" for the remainder of the season. The 1893 setting was also a highlight for Lacson.

Vulture's Siddhant Adlakha rated the episode 3 out of 5 stars, as it was "entertaining in spurts" and has "an era-appropriate gaslight aesthetic", but its key weakness was its "dramatic structure", because the characters' "objectives overlap in significant ways". It seemed to Adlakha that "every bit of conflict is based on a misunderstanding". The best part of the episode for Adlakha was Sylvie's ultimate decision to spare or kill Timely, "as her belief in free will collides with her murderous instincts to maintain that very same freedom".

Space.com's Fran Ruiz wrote that the episode "is fun to watch, but comes across as mostly busywork and a collection of set-ups." Ruiz highlighted that Timely seemed "innocent" and "insecure", but is an intelligent and "proud swindler". Ruiz described Timely as an "exaggerated" scientist caricature in the first half of the episode but felt that Majors brought "convincing humanity" as Timely in the second half by "juggling both curiosity and fear".

The A.V. Club's William Hughes gave the episode a "B-" rating, chiefly criticizing "character actions that don't build to any kind of coherent whole", including Renslayer's "leaping from motivation to motivation", while Loki's automatic goal to save the TVA "remains weirdly under-examined". However, Hughes praised the script and Majors' acting for planting the seeds for why Timely may become He Who Remains, due to Timely's "vision" and "deep desire for isolation, independence, and, above all else, control". Hughes also lauded DiMartino's acting as Sylvie for being "emotionally resonant" in exemplifying "an open wound desperately looking for both a place, and a way, to heal."

Gizmodo's Sabina Graves lamented that the show's female characters "all feel one dimensional so far compared to" the previous season, with the episode being "full of these bizarre moments putting the female characters of Loki at odds with each other, only aligning when they're scorned by the far more interesting male characters". Graves also criticized Majors' performance as Timely, stating that Majors "overly hams it up" as Timely, with the result being that "pacing gets thrown off in these scenes, with Majors cutting the momentum."

=== Accolades ===
Strong was named one of TVLine's "Performer of the Week" honorable mentions for her performance in this episode. The site felt that Strong's voice work added a lot to the "unnerving reveal" and that she had a lot of fun with the "delicious dialogue".
