= Jack Veal =

British actor

- Born: 12 June 2007 (age 19); London, England
- Occupation: Actor
- Years active: 2017–present

Jack Veal (born 12 June 2007) is an English actor known for his role as Kid Loki in Loki (2021).

== Early and personal life ==
Jack Veal was born on 12 June 2007, in London. In 2018, he and his stepfather joined St John Ambulance, which allows young people to learn first aid and provide medical care at events.

In December 2024, Jack revealed that he was homeless, adding that he had been in a physically and emotionally abusive household. He further added that he has autism and ADHD, and was being screened for bipolar disorder and psychosis. Veal additionally revealed that he is still an actor, while also pursuing a career in fitness as a personal trainer. He further described how he had been neglected for accommodation by social services and intended for his videos to reach enough attention to get their attention. Shortly after his videos went viral on social media, Veal made an update explaining that he had been contacted by social services.

== Career ==
In 2017, Veal appeared in the Amazon Prime Video series Tin Star and the Netflix series The End of the F***ing World, as Simon Brown and a young James, respectively. He starred in his first feature film My Name Is Lenny (2017), as a young Lenny. In 2018, he appeared in the BBC series Call the Midwife and the comedy film The Favourite, as Kevin Lunt and Boy, respectively. In 2019, he appeared in the crime film The Corrupted, as a young Liam. In 2020, he appeared in the fantasy film Come Away, as Curly. After appearing in several television shows and films, Veal gained fame when he was cast as Kid Loki in the 2021 streaming series Loki.

== Filmography ==
=== Film ===
Year	Title	Role	Notes
2017	My Name Is Lenny	Young Lenny	
2018	The Favourite	Boy	
2019	The Corrupted	Young Liam	
2020	Come Away	Curly	
2020	His Name Was Gerry	Jack	Short film

=== Television ===
Year	Title	Role	Notes
2017–19	Tin Star	Simon Brown	Episodes: "Fortunate Boy" and "Jack and Coke"
2017	The End of the F***ing World	Young James	5 episodes
2018	Call the Midwife	Kevin Lunt	Episode: "7.3"
2021	Loki	Kid Loki	Episodes: "The Nexus Event" and "Journey into Mystery"
2022	The Peripheral	Young Angus	Episode: "Jackpot"
2025–present	Amandaland	Darius	12 episodes
