= Loki (TV series) =

2021 Marvel Studios television series

- Genre: Action-adventure; Crime thriller; Fantasy; Procedural drama; Science fiction; Superhero
- Created by: Michael Waldron
- Based on: Marvel Comics
- Starring: Tom Hiddleston; Gugu Mbatha-Raw; Wunmi Mosaku; Eugene Cordero; Tara Strong; Owen Wilson; Sophia Di Martino; Sasha Lane; Jack Veal; DeObia Oparei; Richard E. Grant; Jonathan Majors; Rafael Casal; Kate Dickie; Liz Carr; Neil Ellice; Ke Huy Quan; Richard Dixon
- Music by: Natalie Holt
- Country of origin: United States
- Original language: English
- No. of seasons: 2
- No. of episodes: 12

Production
- Executive producers: Kevin Feige; Louis D'Esposito; Victoria Alonso; Stephen Broussard; Tom Hiddleston; Kate Herron; Michael Waldron; Brad Winderbaum; Kevin R. Wright; Justin Benson; Aaron Moorhead; Eric Martin
- Producers: Tommy Turtle; Rachel Alter
- Production locations: Atlanta, Georgia; United Kingdom
- Cinematography: Autumn Durald Arkapaw; Isaac Bauman; Oliver Loncraine
- Editors: Paul Zucker; Calum Ross; Emma McCleave
- Running time: 41–56 minutes
- Production company: Marvel Studios

Original release
- Network: Disney+
- Release: June 9, 2021 – November 9, 2023

Related
- Marvel Cinematic Universe television series

Loki is an American television series created by Michael Waldron for the streaming service Disney+, based on Marvel Comics featuring the character Loki. It is the third television series in the Marvel Cinematic Universe (MCU) produced by Marvel Studios, sharing continuity with the films of the franchise. The series takes place after the events of the film Avengers: Endgame (2019), in which an alternate version of Loki created a new timeline. Waldron served as head writer and Kate Herron directed the first season, with Eric Martin and the duo Justin Benson and Aaron Moorhead serving as head writer and leading the directing team for the second season, respectively.

Tom Hiddleston reprises his role as Loki from the film series, starring alongside Gugu Mbatha-Raw, Wunmi Mosaku, Eugene Cordero, Tara Strong, Owen Wilson, Sophia Di Martino, Jonathan Majors, and Neil Ellice. Sasha Lane, Jack Veal, DeObia Oparei, and Richard E. Grant also star in the first season, with Rafael Casal, Kate Dickie, Liz Carr, Ke Huy Quan and Richard Dixon joining for the second. By September 2018, Marvel Studios was developing several limited series for Disney+, centered on supporting characters from the MCU films. A series featuring Hiddleston as Loki was confirmed in November 2018. Waldron was hired in February 2019, and Herron joined by that August. Martin, who served as a writer on the first season, was revealed to be writing the entire second season in February 2022, along with Benson and Moorhead joining to direct the majority of the season's episodes; Dan DeLeeuw and Kasra Farahani also directed in the second season. Filming occurred in Atlanta, Georgia for the first season, with the second season being filmed in the United Kingdom.

Loki premiered on June 9, 2021. Its first season, consisting of six episodes, concluded on July 14 and is part of Phase Four of the MCU. It received positive reviews from critics, especially for the performances. A second season, also consisting of six episodes, ran from October 5 to November 9, 2023, as part of Phase Five. It also received positive reviews, with praise for its conclusion, musical score, and Loki's character arc.

== Premise ==
After stealing the Tesseract during the events of Avengers: Endgame (2019), an alternate version of Loki is brought to the mysterious Time Variance Authority (TVA), a bureaucratic organization that exists outside of time and space and monitors the timeline. They give Loki a choice: face being erased from existence due to being a "time-variant", or help fix the timeline and stop a greater threat. Loki ends up in his own crime thriller, traveling through time, hunting a female version of himself named Sylvie.

After the first season ends with the timeline breaking and the creation of a multiverse, the second season shows Loki teaming up with Mobius M. Mobius, Hunter B-15, and other TVA agents "in a battle for the soul" of the TVA. This includes a search through the multiverse for Sylvie, Ravonna Renslayer, and Miss Minutes.

== Cast and characters ==
- Tom Hiddleston as Loki:
  The Asgardian god of mischief and Thor's adopted brother, based on the Norse mythological deity of the same name. This is an alternate, "time-variant" version of Loki who created a new timeline in the film Avengers: Endgame (2019) beginning in 2012. Because of this, he has not gone through the events of the films Thor: The Dark World (2013) and Thor: Ragnarok (2017), which reformed the previously villainous character before his death in the film Avengers: Infinity War (2018). Head writer Michael Waldron compared Loki to Apple Inc. co-founder Steve Jobs since both were adopted and love being in control. Hiddleston expressed interest in returning to the role to explore Loki's powers, particularly his shapeshifting, which plays into the series' exploration of identity.
- Gugu Mbatha-Raw as Ravonna Renslayer:
  The former Time Variance Authority (TVA) Hunter A-23 who rose from the ranks to become a respected judge; she oversees the Loki variant investigation. Season one director Kate Herron compared both Mbatha-Raw and Renslayer to chameleons, and said Renslayer was always "trying to dance the line" with Mobius M. Mobius of being both his superior and his friend. Herron added that Mbatha-Raw brought a warmth to Renslayer, while also channeling her pain. Mbatha-Raw called Renslayer "incredibly ambitious" and felt there was the "ultimate personality clash" between her and Loki. She continued that Renslayer has "a lot on her shoulders" and has to make "morally ambiguous choices", which forces the character to keep secrets and build up layers. Waldron believed that Renslayer had "the making of a very complex villain".
- Wunmi Mosaku as Hunter B-15:
  A high-ranking Hunter of the TVA determined to stop the variant that has been killing Minutemen troops. Mosaku called B-15 a "badass" who is a loyal devotee of the TVA, with a strong affinity for the Time-Keepers, whom she believes are gods. Mosaku was drawn to B-15's honesty and ability to be herself, noting, "She doesn't have any social etiquette running through her and her interactions. What she feels and what she thinks is what you see and what you get." Hunter B-15 was originally written as a male character, but changed after Mosaku's audition; she pointed out that the character's gender did not alter the essence of the type of character B-15 was meant to be.
- Eugene Cordero as Casey: A TVA receptionist. Cordero also portrays Hunter K-5E in the new TVA seen at the end of the first season.
- Tara Strong voices Miss Minutes:
  The animated anthropomorphic artificial intelligence (AI) clock mascot of the TVA created by He Who Remains, who she is in love with. Strong voices Miss Minutes with a "Southern drawl", which Herron felt was a representation of Waldron, since he is from the Southern United States. Her design was inspired by Felix the Cat and other cartoons from the early 20th century, with Herron calling Miss Minutes a "Roger Rabbit kind of character". Strong felt the "dire information" Miss Minutes is tasked with conveying was "the perfect mix of who she is", since it is said "with a smile on her face".
- Owen Wilson as Mobius M. Mobius:
  An agent of the TVA who specializes in the investigations of particularly dangerous time criminals. Herron likened Mobius to a hard-boiled detective, with Wilson comparing him to the character Jack Cates in the film 48 Hrs. (1982). Marvel Studios president Kevin Feige noted that the character is similar to Wilson in that he is unfazed by the MCU.
- Sophia Di Martino as Sylvie:
  A variant of Loki who is attacking the "Sacred Timeline" and has enchantment powers. She does not consider herself to be a Loki, using the name "Sylvie" as an alias. While Sylvie was inspired by Sylvie Lushton / Enchantress and Lady Loki from the comics, she is a different person with a different backstory from those characters as well as Hiddleston's Loki. Di Martino kept her regional accent for Sylvie to not sound "too posh or too well spoken", to help reflect the life Sylvie had lived. Hiddleston felt Di Martino incorporated "certain characteristics" he uses for Loki to portray Sylvie, while still making the character "completely her own". An extensive backstory for the character was written by series' writer Elissa Karasik, with Waldron hopeful some of the material could be featured in the second season.
- Sasha Lane as Hunter C-20: A TVA Hunter kidnapped and enchanted by Sylvie to reveal the location of the Time-Keepers.
- Jack Veal as Kid Loki: A young variant of Loki who created a Nexus event by killing Thor and considers himself the king of the Void.
- DeObia Oparei as Boastful Loki: A Loki variant who makes wild exaggerations about his accomplishments.
- Richard E. Grant as Classic Loki:
  An old Loki variant who faked his death to escape being killed by Thanos and decided to live his life in seclusion until he became lonely. Classic Loki has the ability to conjure larger, more elaborate illusions than Loki.
- Jonathan Majors as He Who Remains and Victor Timely: Variants of Kang the Conqueror.
  - He Who Remains is a scientist from the 31st century who ended the first multiversal war by destroying "evil variants" of himself and created the TVA to prevent a new multiverse from forming and to keep his variants from coming back into existence. He is an original creation for the series, inspired by a separate comic book character of the same name as well as the character Immortus.
  - Victor Timely is an industrialist and inventor in 1893 on a branched timeline who created an early version of the Temporal Loom. He has a stutter and an awkward, timid personality, and acts as a con man selling others his creations. Discussing the contrasting personality of Timely to other Kang variants, executive producer Kevin R. Wright said it was "fun" to have Timely be "sort of an eccentric, quiet inventor that maybe is, like, a bit out of time and out of place" rather than the expectation of the next Kang variant to appear in the MCU to be "some sci-fi villain from the future". Marvel Studios was excited to continue exploring Kang and his variants in the season, particularly wanting Timely for Loki, with Wright noting his inclusion and integration would be "a big part" of the season.
- Rafael Casal as Hunter X-5 / Brad Wolfe:
  A TVA Hunter with a close connection to General Dox. Casal called Hunter X-5 "Loki's mirror—another person who feels wronged. He's a bit of a lost character and almost feels like an earlier version of Loki, reflecting back to him." Director Dan DeLeeuw called X-5 "more of a straight villain, more of a heavy; a foil for Loki". X-5 finds his real life on the Sacred Timeline and becomes the actor Brad Wolfe. DeLeeuw thought Casal "brought an interesting humanity" to his portrayal of Wolfe, explaining that it was his choice to become Wolfe to break free from the TVA being X-5's reality. As well, the creative team "couldn't resist" having a character who no longer believed in the reality of the TVA becoming an actor, given Wolfe now "puts on a perception of reality for a living".
- Kate Dickie as General Dox:
  A TVA general who is part of the new council of judges following Renslayer's disappearance. She is searching for Sylvie and still believes in the TVA's mission to prune branched timelines.
- Liz Carr as Judge Gamble: A TVA judge part of the new council.
- Neil Ellice as Hunter D-90: A TVA Hunter.
- Ke Huy Quan as Ouroboros "O.B.":
  A TVA agent who works in its Repairs and Advancement Department. Described as the "quirky repair guy", Wright explained that every piece of technology at the TVA was either designed by O.B. or he knows how to fix it and keep it operational.
- Richard Dixon as Robber Baron: An industrialist who purchases a faulty invention from Victor Timely at the 1893 Chicago's World's Fair.

== Episodes ==
| Season | Episodes | Originally released | |
| Season | Episodes | First released | Last released |
|---|---|---|---|
| 1 | 6 | June 9, 2021 | July 14, 2021 |
| 2 | 6 | October 5, 2023 | November 9, 2023 |

=== Season 1 (2021) ===
| No. overall | No. in season | Title | Directed by | Written by | Original release date |
|---|---|---|---|---|---|
| 1 | 1 | "Glorious Purpose" | Kate Herron | Michael Waldron | June 9, 2021 |
| 2 | 2 | "The Variant" | Kate Herron | Elissa Karasik | June 16, 2021 |
| 3 | 3 | "Lamentis" | Kate Herron | Bisha K. Ali | June 23, 2021 |
| 4 | 4 | "The Nexus Event" | Kate Herron | Eric Martin | June 30, 2021 |
| 5 | 5 | "Journey into Mystery" | Kate Herron | Tom Kauffman | July 7, 2021 |
| 6 | 6 | "For All Time. Always." | Kate Herron | Michael Waldron & Eric Martin | July 14, 2021 |

=== Season 2 (2023) ===
| No. overall | No. in season | Title | Directed by | Written by | Original release date |
|---|---|---|---|---|---|
| 7 | 1 | "Ouroboros" | Justin Benson & Aaron Moorhead | Eric Martin | October 5, 2023 |
| 8 | 2 | "Breaking Brad" | Dan DeLeeuw | Eric Martin | October 12, 2023 |
| 9 | 3 | "1893" | Kasra Farahani | Teleplay by : Eric Martin and Kasra Farahani & Jason O'Leary; Story by : Eric Martin | October 19, 2023 |
| 10 | 4 | "Heart of the TVA" | Aaron Moorhead & Justin Benson | Eric Martin and Katharyn Blair | October 26, 2023 |
| 11 | 5 | "Science/Fiction" | Justin Benson & Aaron Moorhead | Eric Martin | November 2, 2023 |
| 12 | 6 | "Glorious Purpose" | Aaron Moorhead & Justin Benson | Eric Martin | November 9, 2023 |

== Production ==
=== Development ===
By September 2018, Marvel Studios was developing several limited series for its parent company Disney's streaming service, Disney+, to be centered on supporting characters from the Marvel Cinematic Universe (MCU) films who had not starred in their own films, such as Loki; the actors who portrayed the characters in the films were expected to reprise their roles for the limited series. These series were expected to be six to eight episodes each and have a "hefty [budget] rivaling those of a major studio production". The series would be produced by Marvel Studios, rather than Marvel Television, which produced previous television series in the MCU. Marvel Studios President Kevin Feige was believed to be taking a "hands-on role" in each series' development, focusing on "continuity of story" with the films and "handling" the actors who would be reprising their roles from the films. Disney CEO Bob Iger confirmed in November that a series centered on Loki was in development and that Tom Hiddleston was expected to reprise his role from the film series.

The series was expected to follow Loki as he "pops up throughout human history as an unlikely influencer on historical events". Marvel Studios chose to make a series about Loki because of his story potential, and because he had lived for thousands of years in the MCU, and a series could fill in the blanks of his various unseen adventures. The series also provided Marvel Studios the opportunity to work with Hiddleston more, explore the character beyond his supporting role in the films, and show him build new relationships rather than just developing his relationship with Thor. This allowed Loki's previous film appearances to retain their integrity, so the series did not have to retread those storylines.

Hiddleston considered Loki's death in Avengers: Infinity War (2018) to be the emotional end of his character arc, though he knew when he filmed the death scene that he would make a cameo appearance in Avengers: Endgame (2019). That Endgame scene sees a 2012 version of Loki escape with the Tesseract, which was not intended by the writers to set up a future television series as Loki was not planned then. Hiddleston was unaware of where Loki had gone with the Tesseract when he filmed the scene in 2017, and did not learn about plans for Loki until around six weeks before Infinity War was released. He kept plans for the series a secret until the official announcement later in 2018 and later expressed excitement about being able to develop Loki differently by taking an earlier version of the character and bringing him into contact with new, more "formidable" opponents. Hiddleston worked with Marvel Studios executive and eventual series' executive producer Kevin R. Wright to create a 30-page document to define the series before any writers or directors were hired. The document included the main elements of the series, such as the Time Variance Authority, He Who Remains, and Victor Timely.

Michael Waldron was hired as head writer and executive producer of the series in February 2019, and was set to write the first episode. In August 2019, Kate Herron was announced as director and executive producer. In addition to Waldron and Herron, executive producers for the series include Feige, Louis D'Esposito, Victoria Alonso, Stephen Broussard, and Hiddleston, with Wright as a co-executive producer. The first season consists of six, 40–50-minute episodes.

Loki was originally planned as a single season, but during production of the first season it was realized that there was "so much to explore with Loki" and the story could continue; Hiddleston and Wright began having conversations during production of the season one episode "Lamentis" regarding "how this world could build out" to "dive deeper into it". Development on a second season had begun by November 2020. In January 2021, Waldron signed an overall deal with Disney and part of that deal included his involvement in the second season of Loki "in some capacity". Marvel Studios producer Nate Moore, who served as an executive producer on the series The Falcon and the Winter Soldier, believed Loki had "really irreverent and clever and cool" storylines that lent to the series having multiple seasons rather than being a one-off event. A second season was confirmed through a mid-credits scene in the first-season finale. Herron said she would not return as director for the second season, and in July 2021, Waldron said it "remain[ed] to be seen" if he would be involved. In February 2022, the directing duo Justin Benson and Aaron Moorhead were hired to direct a majority of the episodes for the second season, while Eric Martin, a first-season writer who took over some of Waldron's duties during production on that season, was set to write the six-episode second season. Benson and Moorhead previously directed two episodes of Moon Knight (2022), which went "so smoothly" that Marvel Studios wanted the duo to work on other projects, and they were quickly chosen for the second season of Loki. Hiddleston and Waldron were set to return as executive producers at that time. Dan DeLeeuw, a visual effects supervisor and second unit director on several MCU films, and series' production designer Kasra Farahani were revealed as directors for the second season in June. Wright was upped to executive producer for the second season, and joined the season one executive producers with fellow Marvel Studios executive Brad Winderbaum, as well as Benson, Moorhead, and Martin.

Regarding future seasons, Wright called the series "open-ended", with no third season planned by the release of the second in October 2023. However, he thought there were still more stories to tell with the character in the world they created for the series, as well as the larger MCU, and was hopeful by the end of the second season, Loki would be in "a certain place emotionally" to have him rejoin the larger MCU, specifically meeting Thor. Wright also hoped that other MCU properties would use the TVA, feeling they could "be this exciting connective tool for all of this storytelling"; the TVA was first featured elsewhere in the film Deadpool & Wolverine (2024).

=== Writing ===
The series begins after Avengers: Endgame, which saw Loki steal the Tesseract during the 2012 events of The Avengers (2012), creating an alternate timeline from the main MCU films. The first season sees the Loki time variant traveling through time and altering human history, with a "man-on-the-run" and an "unexpected" science fiction quality to it; the season also explores Loki's identity. Loki falls in love with his female variant, Sylvie, in the season, which was a large part of Waldron's pitch for the series. He noted they were uncertain if portraying Loki falling in love with another version of himself was "too crazy". He continued by saying Loki was "ultimately about self-love, self-reflection, and forgiving yourself" and it "felt right" for the series be the character's first "real love story".

Feige stated in November 2019 that the series would tie-into Doctor Strange in the Multiverse of Madness, but in May 2021 he would not reconfirm this or whether the series would tie in with any other MCU projects, though he did say the series would "lay the groundwork" for the future of the MCU. Waldron noted that, as with all MCU properties, the aim was for Loki to have "wide-reaching ramifications" across the franchise. In the first-season finale, the "man behind the curtain" of the TVA is revealed to be He Who Remains, a variant of the Ant-Man and the Wasp: Quantumania (2023) character Kang the Conqueror. Jonathan Majors portrays both roles, and Waldron felt it made "so much sense" to introduce Majors in the series, since Kang is "a time-traveling, multiversal adversary" and thought to be "the next big cross-movie villain". Marvel Studios was not initially planning to have "The Multiverse Saga", which comprises Phase Four, Phase Five, and Phase Six, revolve around Kang, but decided to after seeing Majors' performance in the episode and the dailies while filming Quantumania. The first-season finale also sets up the events of Doctor Strange in the Multiverse of Madness, and elements of Spider-Man: No Way Home (2021).

The second season helps connect the entire Multiverse Saga. Wright stated that the creatives wanted to push the weirdness of the series further in the second season, while still keeping the longer, character-driven moments, notably the friendship between Loki and Mobius. Much of the season was about each character becoming the best versions of themselves. According to Martin, the themes of the second season were order versus chaos and "what happens in a power vacuum", likening the season's overarching concept to the phrase "you break it, you buy it", while still continuing the ideas of free will and destiny from the first season.

=== Casting ===
The starring cast for the first season includes Hiddleston as Loki, Gugu Mbatha-Raw as Ravonna Renslayer, Wunmi Mosaku as Hunter B-15, Eugene Cordero as Casey and later Hunter K-5E, Tara Strong voicing Miss Minutes, Owen Wilson as Mobius M. Mobius, Sophia Di Martino as Sylvie, Sasha Lane as Hunter C-20, Jack Veal as Kid Loki, DeObia Oparei as Boastful Loki, Richard E. Grant as Classic Loki, and Jonathan Majors as He Who Remains. Neil Ellice recurs in the season as Hunter D-90.

Hiddleston, Di Martino, Mbatha-Raw, Mosaku, Cordero, Strong, Ellice, and Wilson return as Loki, Sylvie, Renslayer, Hunter B-15, Casey / Hunter K-5E, Miss Minutes, Hunter D-90, and Mobius, respectively, for the second season. Cordero and Ellice were made series regulars for the second season. Majors also returns in the season as He Who Remains, while also portraying an additional Kang the Conqueror variant Victor Timely, who was introduced at the end of Quantumania. Joining them for the season are Rafael Casal as Hunter X-5 / Brad Wolfe, Kate Dickie as General Dox, Liz Carr as Judge Gamble, Ke Huy Quan as Ouroboros "O.B.", and Richard Dixon as Robber Baron.

=== Filming ===
Filming for the first season occurred at Pinewood Atlanta Studios, with Autumn Durald Arkapaw serving as cinematographer. Location shooting took place in the Atlanta metropolitan area. Production on the first season was halted due to the COVID-19 pandemic. Filming for the second season occurred at Pinewood Studios in the United Kingdom, and on location in London, with Isaac Bauman and Oliver Loncraine serving as cinematographers.

=== Visual effects ===
Visual effects for the series were provided by Cantina Creative, FuseFX, Industrial Light & Magic, and Trixter, with Crafty Apes, Digital Domain, Luma Pictures, Method Studios, Rise FX, and Rodeo FX also providing visual effects in the first season, and Framestore and Rising Sun Pictures also providing visual effects in the second.

=== Music ===
Natalie Holt serves as the composer of the series. The score for the first season was released digitally by Marvel Music and Hollywood Records in two volumes: music from the first three episodes was released on July 2, 2021, and music from the last three episodes was released on July 23. The first episode's end credits track "TVA" was released as a single on June 11.

== Release ==
=== Streaming ===
Loki debuted on Disney+ on June 9, 2021, with the first season consisting of six episodes, concluding on July 14. It is part of Phase Four of the MCU. The second season also consisted of six episodes, and premiered on October 5, 2023, concluding on November 9, as part of Phase Five of the MCU.

=== Home media ===
The first season of Loki was released on Ultra HD Blu-ray and Blu-ray by Walt Disney Studios Home Entertainment on September 26, 2023, and the second season was released on Ultra HD Blu-ray and Blu-Ray on December 3, 2024.

== Reception ==
=== Audience viewership ===
In May 2022, Feige announced that Loki was the most-watched Marvel Studios Disney+ series to date.

=== Critical response ===
Critical response of Loki
| Season | Rotten Tomatoes | Metacritic |
|---|---|---|
| 1 | 92% (338 reviews) | 74 (32 reviews) |
| 2 | 81% (161 reviews) | 65 (23 reviews) |

For the first season, the review aggregator website Rotten Tomatoes reports a 92% approval rating with an average rating of 7.9/10, based on 338 reviews. The critical consensus reads, "A delightful diversion from the MCU as we know it, Loki successfully sees star Tom Hiddleston leap from beloved villain to endearing antihero—with a little help from Owen Wilson—in a series that's as off-kilter, charming, and vaguely dangerous as the demigod himself." Metacritic, which uses a weighted average, assigned a score of 74 out of 100 based on 32 critics, indicating "generally favorable" reviews.

For the second season, Rotten Tomatoes reports an 81% approval rating with an average rating of 7.3/10, based on 161 reviews. The critical consensus reads, "Loki's dizzying, dazzling second season may rely on sleight of hand to distract from its slightly less satisfying storyline, but the end result still contains enough of that old Marvel magic to entertain." Metacritic assigned a score of 65 out of 100 based on 23 critics, indicating "generally favorable" reviews.

=== Accolades ===
Loki was nominated for nine Primetime Creative Arts Emmy Awards, nine Critics' Choice Super Awards (winning one), one Harvey Award, one Hugo Award, three MTV Movie & TV Awards (winning two), four People's Choice Awards (winning two), one Screen Actors Guild Award, seven Visual Effects Society Awards (winning one), and two Writers Guild of America Awards, among others.

== Other media ==
=== Documentary specials ===
In February 2021, the documentary series Marvel Studios: Assembled was announced. The special on this series, "The Making of Loki", goes behind the scenes of the first season, featuring Waldron, Herron, Hiddleston, Mbatha-Raw, Mosaku, Wilson, Di Martino, Oparei, Grant, and Majors. The special was released on Disney+ on July 21, 2021. A special for the second season, "The Making of Loki: Season 2", was released on Disney+ on November 22, 2023.

=== TVA comic book ===
In July 2024, Marvel Comics announced the five-issue comic book series TVA, written by Loki season two writer Katharyn Blair with art by Pere Perez. The series sees the comics' version of the TVA blended with the one established in the MCU, and also introduces several MCU characters to the comics. Blair said TVA was her "comics interpretation" of the organization following Loki's sacrifice at the end of season two, calling it a "funny, in-between awesome space". The series features Mobius, O.B., Casey, B-15, and Miss Minutes from Loki, along with comics characters who have been displaced from their timelines such as Gwen Stacy, Jimmy Hudson, Captain Peggy Carter, and Gambit. Additional characters featured in the comic include Daimon Hellstrom, Nightmare, and Wanda Maximoff / Scarlet Witch. It also introduces the original characters Sir Seconds and Doc Clock, two AI clock mascots similar to Miss Minutes. TVA ran for five issues, and was released from December 2024 to April 2025. According to review aggregator Comic Book Roundup, the series received an 8.8 out of 10, based on 8 reviews. A collected edition trade paperback, TVA: For All Time Always, was released in August 2025.
