= Kate Herron =

English writer, director and producer (born 1987)

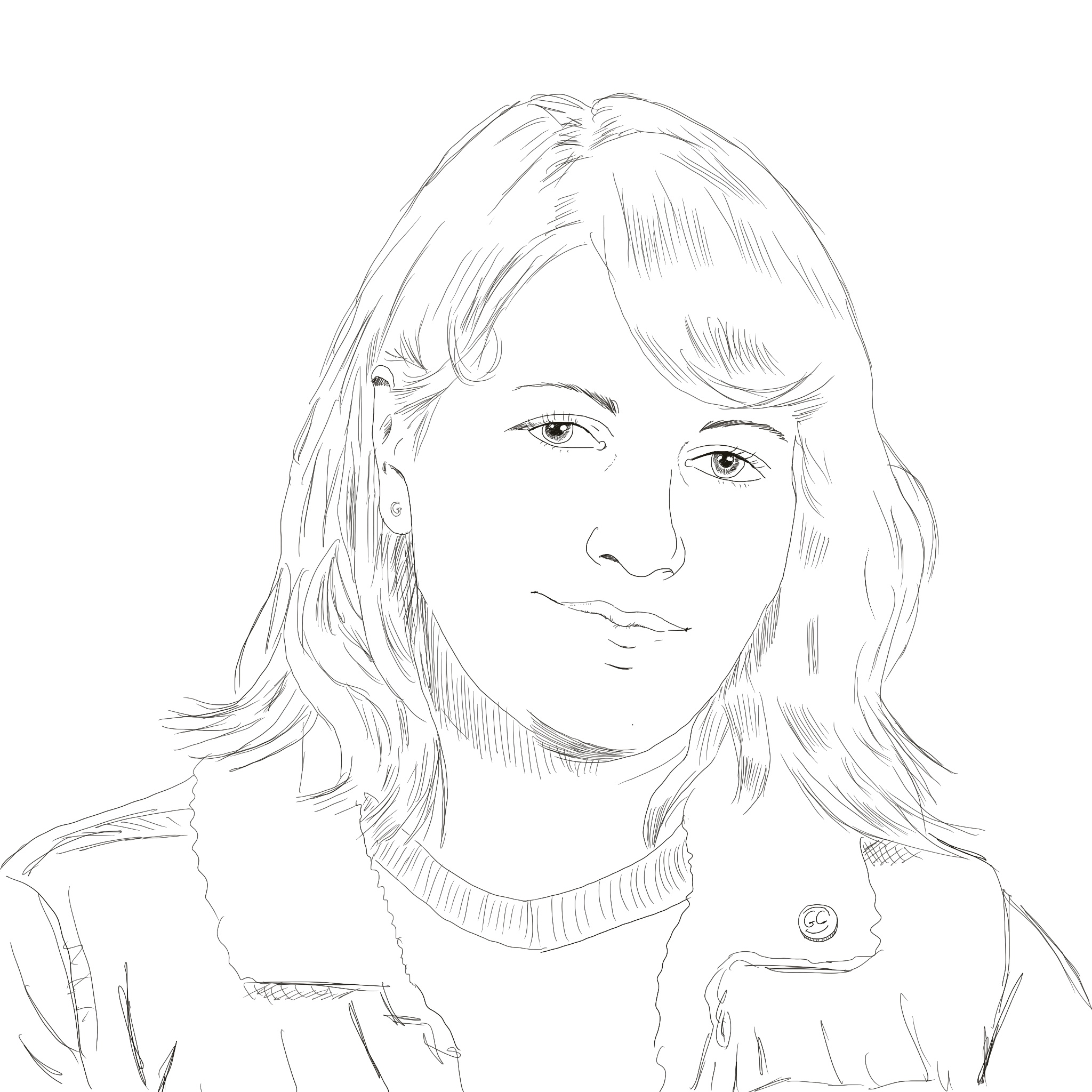
- Portrait of Herron by Grégory Cornu, 2022
- Born: October 28, 1987 (age 39)
- Education: University for the Creative Arts
- Occupations: Director, writer, producer
- Years active: 2010–present
- Notable work: Loki; Sex Education; Doctor Who
- Website: www.kateherron.com

Kate Herron (born October 28, 1987) is an English director, writer and producer. She is known for her female-led comedies. She directed and executive produced the first season of the Disney+ series Loki.

== Early life and education ==
Herron grew up in southeast London, near Thamesmead. She attended the University for the Creative Arts in Farnham, where she studied Film Production.

== Career ==
Herron began her career writing and directing short films, such as Frank and Rest Stop. She started her television career in 2017 working with Idris Elba on Five By Five, a five-episode drama from The Idris Takeover for BBC Three. The same year, she was a member of Forbes 30 Under 30 Europe under the entertainment category. Two years later, she directed four episodes of the Netflix series Sex Education. She also directed one episode of Daybreak, another Netflix series.

In August 2019, it was announced she would be directing and executive producing the first season of the Disney+ series Loki.

In October 2023, it was announced that Herron and Briony Redman would be writing an episode of Doctor Who.

In January 2024, it was announced Herron would be a director on the second season of The Last of Us. In March 2024, it was announced that Herron will direct a film based on The Sims video game franchise and will co-write with Briony Redman.

In November 2026, it was announced that Herron would direct, produce, and co-write, with Kari Granlund, a feature film adaptation of Scarlet Morning by ND Stevenson for Amazon MGM Studios, with Roy Lee serving as a producer on the project.

== Personal life ==
Herron describes herself as an “awkward, anxious nerd” and has spoken about her lifelong interest in fantasy and genre cinema.

She identifies as queer. Whilst directing the first season of Loki, she advocated for the title character’s bisexuality to be acknowledged onscreen, describing it as important to her and part of her objective for the series.

== Filmography ==
=== Short film ===
Year	Title	Director	Writer	Producer
2010	Frank	Yes	Yes	No
2012	Kill List: The Musical	Yes	Yes	No
2012	Run Toward Them	Yes	Yes	No
2013	Open House	Yes	Yes	No
2014	Sam & Isobel	Assistant	No	No
2014	Valentine	Yes	Yes	No
2014	Healey's House	No	Yes	No
2014	Rest Stop	Yes	Yes	No
2016	Fan Girl	Yes	No	Yes
2017	Smear	Yes	Yes	No

=== Television ===
Year	Title	Director	Writer	Executive Producer	Notes
2017	The Idris Takeover	Yes	No	No	5 episodes
2017	Summer Comedy Shorts	Yes	No	No	Episode: "Ellie White & Vicki Pepperdine's Summer"
2017	Halloween Comedy Shorts	Yes	No	No	Episode: "Twin Thing"
2019	Sex Education	Yes	No	No	4 episodes
2019	Daybreak	Yes	No	No	Episode: "Post Mates"
2021	Loki	Yes	No	Yes	6 episodes
2024	Doctor Who	No	Yes	No	Episode: "Rogue" (co-wrote with Briony Redman)
2025	The Last of Us	Yes	No	No	Episode: "Day One"
2026	Margo's Got Money Troubles	Yes	No	No	2 episodes

== Awards and nominations ==
Year	Award	Category	Work	Result
2014	Rhode Island International Film Festival	Best Comedy Short	Rest Stop	Won
2022	Hugo Awards	Best Dramatic Presentation – Short Form	Loki	Nominated
