= Rafael Casal =

American actor and writer (born 1985)

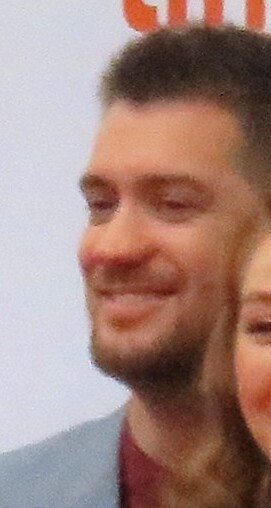
- Casal in 2019
- Born: Rafael Santiago Casal; August 8, 1985 (age 41); Berkeley, California
- Education: Berkeley High School
- Occupations: Writer; poet; producer; showrunner; actor; musician; singer
- Years active: 2008–present

Rafael Santiago Casal (born August 8, 1985) is an American writer, rapper, producer, director, actor, musician, and showrunner originally from the San Francisco Bay Area.

== Early life ==
Casal grew up in Berkeley and Oakland, California. He was expelled from Berkeley High School after two years but earned his diploma through an alternative independent study program. Casal later designed and served as creative director of the University of Wisconsin-Madison's First Wave Spoken Word and Hip Hop Arts Program while earning a sociology degree at night.

Casal has Irish ancestry on his mother's side and Spanish ancestry on his Cuban father's side.

== Career ==
=== Poetry ===
At 18, Casal appeared on 3 seasons of HBO's Def Poetry Jam while touring, performing, and teaching nationwide with YouthSpeaks. He is a two-time Brave New Voice Poetry Slam Festival champion.

=== Music ===
Casal has released several mixtapes online, including As Good As Your Word (2008), Monster (2009), and Mean Ones (2012). He also collaborated with best friend Daveed Diggs and Chinaka Hodge to release The Getback Mixtape, vol. 1 (2007) and The BAY BOY Mixtape (2010) as the Getback Productions Crew.

In 2018, Casal and Diggs released the Collin and Miles EPs to accompany their film Blindspotting.

=== Theater ===
Casal and Diggs co-founded the BARS workshop at the Public Theater in New York City. The workshops serve as a platform for artists to explore and enhance their craft by merging contemporary verse with theatre.

=== Film and television ===
In 2018, Casal and Daveed Diggs released their movie, Blindspotting. The duo wrote, produced, and starred in the film, which uses verse to tell the story of Oakland.

In 2020, the movie was adapted as a comedy drama series. Casal reprised his role as Miles and served as co-writer, director, executive producer, and showrunner. The series premiered at the Tribeca Film Festival on June 11, 2021, and began streaming on Starz on June 13, 2021. Season 2 premiered at SXSW in March 2023 and began streaming on April 14, 2023. In September 2023, Blindspotting was cancelled.

Casal has also appeared in supporting roles in Bad Education, The Good Lord Bird and the second revival of Are You Afraid of the Dark?. In 2023, he appeared as X-5/Brad Wolfe in the second season of the series Loki. In 2026, Casal played the role of Neil in four episodes of the Netflix series The Boroughs (2026).

== Filmography ==
Key
†	Denotes works that have not yet been released

Year	Title	Role	Notes
2010	Ricochet in Reverse	Dylan Klebold	YouTube Short
2014	The Away Team	Cal	Web series; also creator, producer, director
2018	Blindspotting	Miles	Also co-producer, co-writer
2018	Rachel Dratch's Late Night Snack	Elliot	Season 2 Episode 7
2019	Stucco	Throne - Crowning Arm	Short
2019	Bad Education	Kyle Contreras	
2019	Are You Afraid of the Dark?	Mr. Top Hat	3 episodes; miniseries
2020	The Good Lord Bird	John E. Cook	3 episodes; miniseries
2021-2023	Blindspotting	Miles	Also creator, executive producer, director, and writer
2023	Wildcat	O.E. Parker	Appears in 9 minute Vignette "Parker's back"
2023	Loki	Hunter X-5 / Brad Wolfe	4 episodes; season 2
2025–present	The Lowdown	Johnny	7 episodes; director: 2 episodes
2026	The Boroughs	Neil	Recurring role
TBA	Fade to Black†	Zach	
TBA	Iron Jane†		Post-production
