= Neil Ellice =

Scottish actor

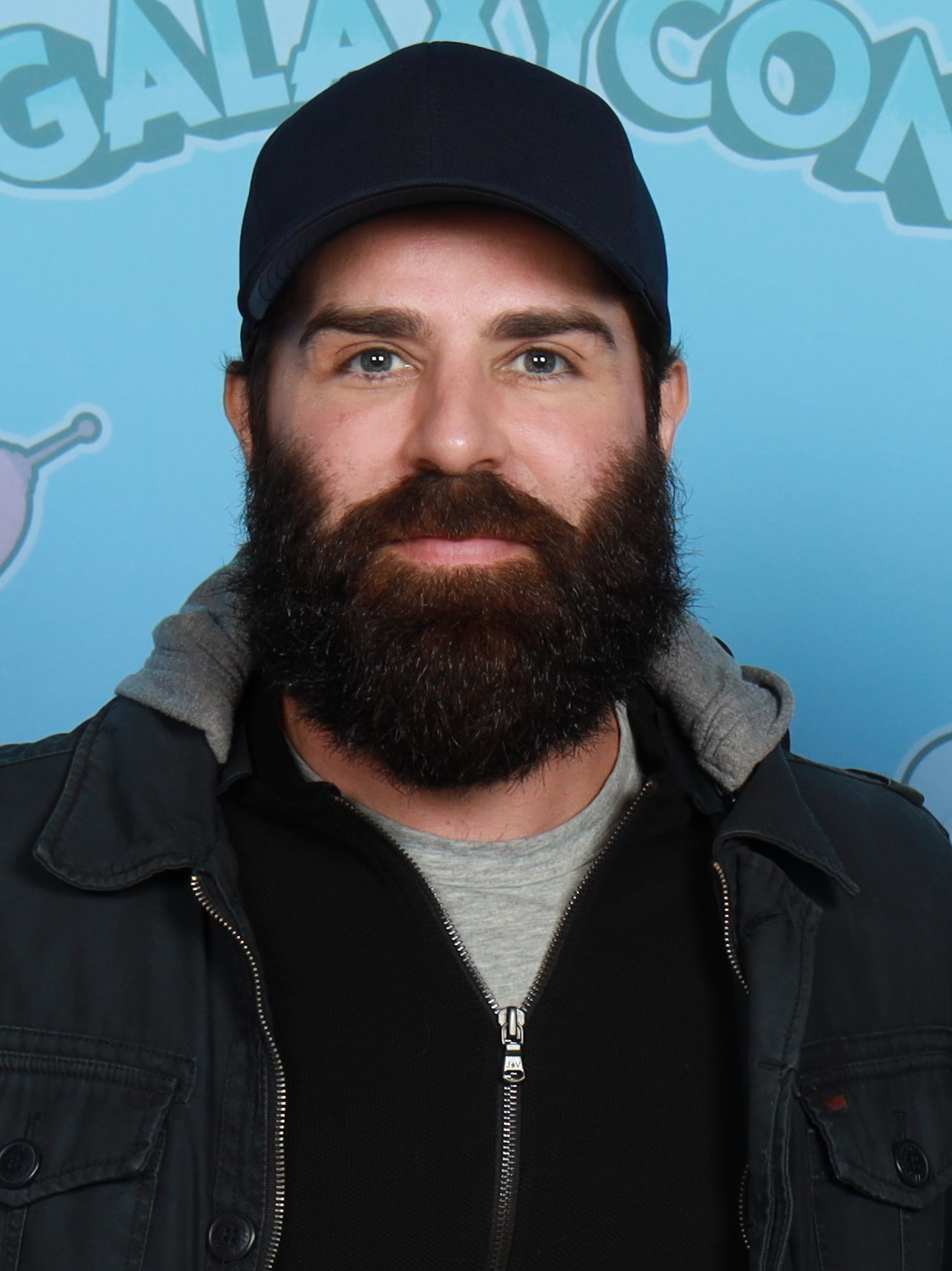
- Ellice in 2025
- Born: London, England
- Occupations: Actor; producer; voiceover artist
- Years active: 2012-present
- Agent: Innovative Artists

Neil Ellice is a Scottish-English actor, producer, voiceover and motion capture artist. He is best known for his roles as Hunter D-90 in the TV series Loki and John "Soap" MacTavish in the video games Call of Duty: Modern Warfare and Call of Duty: Warzone.

== Career ==
Ellice trained at the National Youth Theatre of Great Britain and the Shakespeare Summer School at the Royal Academy of Dramatic Art.

Ellice later became a production assistant of the TV series Mortal Kombat: Legacy. He went on to have his first acting job as a Marine in Halo 4: Forward Unto Dawn. He then appeared in a few films and TV shows before landing his major role as John "Soap" MacTavish at the video game Call of Duty: Modern Warfare. Moreover, he is also a recurring cast member in the TV series Loki as Hunter D-90. He later voiced characters for Game of Thrones: Kingsroad and Marvel's Wolverine.

Ellice narrates the audiobook version of the book Velocity of a Secret by Violet Marsh with voice actress Stella Hunter.

He is also one of the producers of the short film The Final Moments of Karl Brant, starring Paul Reubens and Janina Gavankar.

== Acting credits ==
=== Film ===
Year	Title	Role
2013	Oz the Great and Powerful	Theodora's Guard (uncredited)
2013	Minotaur	Suspicious Guard
2014	Nzara '76	Dr. Peter Franklin
2017	Tour de Pharmacy	Sports Masseur

=== Television ===
Year	Title	Role	Notes
2012	The Unknown	Police Officer	Episode: "Spare the Child"
2012	Halo 4: Forward Unto Dawn	Marine	5 episodes
2017	I'm Dying Up Here	Rock Star	—N/a
2021-2023	Loki	Hunter D-90	8 episodes

=== Video games ===
Year	Title	Role	Notes
2019	Call of Duty: Modern Warfare	John "Soap" MacTavish	Voice and motion capture
2020	Call of Duty: Warzone	John "Soap" MacTavish	Voice and motion capture
2022	Call of Duty: Modern Warfare II	John "Soap" MacTavish	Voice and motion capture
2023	Call of Duty: Modern Warfare III	John "Soap" MacTavish	Voice and motion capture
2025	Game of Thrones: Kingsroad	Atmospheric Characters (40)	Voice only
2026	Marvel's Wolverine	Additional Cast	Voice only
