= Loki season 1 =

Loki
- Season 1
- Promotional poster
- Starring: Tom Hiddleston; Gugu Mbatha-Raw; Wunmi Mosaku; Eugene Cordero; Tara Strong; Owen Wilson; Sophia Di Martino; Sasha Lane; Jack Veal; DeObia Oparei; Richard E. Grant; Jonathan Majors
- No. of episodes: 6

Release
- Original network: Disney+
- Original release: June 9 – July 14, 2021

Season chronology
- Next → Season 2

The first season of the American television series Loki, based on Marvel Comics featuring the character of the same name, sees Loki brought to the mysterious Time Variance Authority (TVA) after stealing the Tesseract during the events of Avengers: Endgame (2019), and is forced to help catch a dangerous variant version of himself. It is set in the Marvel Cinematic Universe (MCU), sharing continuity with the films and television series of the franchise. The season was produced by Marvel Studios, with Michael Waldron serving as head writer and Kate Herron directing.

Tom Hiddleston reprises his role as Loki from the film series, with Gugu Mbatha-Raw, Wunmi Mosaku, Eugene Cordero, Tara Strong, Owen Wilson, Sophia Di Martino, Sasha Lane, Jack Veal, DeObia Oparei, Richard E. Grant, and Jonathan Majors also starring. Loki was officially confirmed among the various Disney+ series in development from Marvel Studios in November 2018, along with Hiddleston's involvement. Filming began in February 2020 in Atlanta, Georgia, but was halted in March due to the COVID-19 pandemic. Production resumed that September and completed in December. The series takes place after the events of the film Avengers: Endgame, in which an alternate version of Loki created a new timeline, diverging from the events of The Avengers (2012). The season has a crime thriller tone, and sets up the events of the MCU films Doctor Strange in the Multiverse of Madness (2022) and Ant-Man and the Wasp: Quantumania (2023).

The first season premiered on Disney+ on June 9, 2021, running for six episodes until July 14, as part of Phase Four of the MCU. It received positive reviews, with praise for the cast's performances, musical score, and visuals. A second season was announced in July 2021.

== Episodes ==
| No. overall | No. in season | Title | Directed by | Written by | Original release date |
|---|---|---|---|---|---|
| 1 | 1 | "Glorious Purpose" | Kate Herron | Michael Waldron | June 9, 2021 |
Loki is arrested by the Time Variance Authority (TVA) when he creates a new timeline after escaping from the Battle of New York with the Tesseract in 2012. (Note: As depicted in the film Avengers: Endgame (2019)) The TVA resets the timeline, and this "variant" Loki stands trial in front of Judge Ravonna Renslayer for crimes against the "Sacred Timeline". Loki blames the situation on the Avengers, who had traveled back in time to 2012, but Renslayer says their actions were meant to happen unlike Loki's escape. Agent Mobius M. Mobius takes Loki to the Time Theater to review his past misdeeds and question his history of hurting people. He reveals that Loki, in his intended future, inadvertently causes the death of his adoptive mother Frigga. (Note: As depicted in the film Thor: The Dark World (2013)) Loki attempts to escape, but gives up after realizing that the TVA's power exceeds that of the Infinity Stones. He returns to the Time Theater and watches more future events, including his own death at the hands of Thanos. (Note: As depicted in the film Avengers: Infinity War (2018)) He then agrees to help Mobius hunt another Loki variant, who was killing several TVA agents and stealing their timeline-resetting charges.
| 2 | 2 | "The Variant" | Kate Herron | Elissa Karasik | June 16, 2021 |
Loki joins a TVA mission to the site of an attack by "The Variant" in 1985 Oshkosh, Wisconsin, where he stalls and attempts to bargain his way into meeting the Time-Keepers, who the TVA claims created them and the Sacred Timeline. Renslayer objects to Loki's further involvement, but Mobius convinces her to give him another chance. Loki researches TVA files and theorizes that the Variant is hiding near apocalyptic events where their actions do not affect the timeline. Loki and Mobius confirm this possibility by visiting Pompeii in 79 AD, before deducing that the Variant is hiding during a hurricane in 2050 Alabama. There, they are ambushed by the Variant who enchants several locals and TVA agent Hunter B-15. The Variant reveals herself to be a female version of Loki and rejects his offer to overthrow the Time-Keepers together. She sends the stolen reset charges to various points along the Sacred Timeline, which activate and create numerous branched timelines that throw the TVA into disarray. She teleports away, and Loki follows her.
| 3 | 3 | "Lamentis" | Kate Herron | Bisha K. Ali | June 23, 2021 |
With the TVA distracted, the Variant arrives at their headquarters and attempts to find the Time-Keepers, but is followed and confronted by Loki. They are attacked by Renslayer, and Loki uses a TemPad to teleport them both to 2077 Lamentis-1, a moon that is about to be crushed by a planet. The TemPad runs out of power and is magically hidden by Loki. The Variant, who goes by Sylvie, agrees to work with Loki to charge it. They sneak aboard a train bound for the ark, an evacuation spaceship that could recharge the TemPad, but Loki gets drunk and draws attention. This leads to a fight with guards who throw him off the train. Sylvie follows him, only to find the TemPad broken. The duo continue on foot, intending to commandeer the ark so they can escape before Lamentis-1 is destroyed. On the way, Sylvie reveals that the TVA's workers are actually variants of people from Earth. Loki and Sylvie fight their way through guards and a crowd of people attempting to board the ark, but meteors from the oncoming planet destroy it before they can board.
| 4 | 4 | "The Nexus Event" | Kate Herron | Eric Martin | June 30, 2021 |
Sylvie tells Loki that she escaped from the TVA as a child. They form a romantic bond, which creates a unique branched timeline and alerts the TVA to find and arrest them before Lamentis-1 is destroyed. Mobius leaves Loki in a time loop of a bad memory he has of Sif while Sylvie unlocks B-15's memories to prove that B-15 is a variant. Renslayer tells Mobius that C-20 died from a mental breakdown, but Mobius finds a recording of Renslayer interrogating a mentally sound C-20, who insists that the TVA workers are all variants. Mobius frees Loki from the time loop, but Renslayer confronts them and has Mobius "pruned". Renslayer takes Loki and Sylvie to the Time-Keepers, who order Loki and Sylvie to be deleted. With B-15's help, Loki and Sylvie defeat Renslayer and the Time-Keepers' guards. Sylvie beheads one of the Time-Keepers, but discovers they are androids before a recovered Renslayer prunes Loki. Sylvie overpowers Renslayer and demands the truth. In a mid-credits scene, Loki awakens surrounded by several other Loki variants.
| 5 | 5 | "Journey into Mystery" | Kate Herron | Tom Kauffman | July 7, 2021 |
Renslayer tells Sylvie that when Loki was pruned, he was sent to the Void at the end of time, from which nothing has ever returned. They deduce that the TVA's true creator is hiding beyond the Void. TVA mascot Miss Minutes stalls for time until TVA troopers surround Sylvie, who prunes herself and soon meets Mobius in the Void. After interrogating B-15, Renslayer plans to reach the TVA's true creator. Meanwhile, the other Loki variants tell Loki that a massive cloud-like creature called Alioth destroys everything in the Void. After encountering a second Loki group that devolves into infighting, Classic Loki helps Loki, Alligator Loki, and Kid Loki escape. They come across Mobius and Sylvie, and Mobius returns to the TVA using a TemPad that Sylvie brought with her. Sylvie attempts to enchant Alioth while Loki distracts it, but they fail until Classic Loki sacrifices himself, creating an illusion of Asgard to draw Alioth's attention. Loki and Sylvie successfully enchant Alioth together, and the creature shows them the way to a citadel beyond the Void.
| 6 | 6 | "For All Time. Always." | Kate Herron | Michael Waldron & Eric Martin | July 14, 2021 |
Renslayer leaves on a mission to find "free will" after Miss Minutes gives her information from the TVA's creator, "He Who Remains". B-15 proves to TVA troopers that they are variants by showing them a Renslayer variant who is a school vice-principal. Meanwhile, in the Citadel at the End of Time, He Who Remains tells Loki and Sylvie that he ended a multiversal war between his variants by using Alioth to destroy alternate timelines and created the TVA to maintain this peace. As he has grown weary, he offers them a choice: kill him and risk another multiversal war or replace him in overseeing the TVA and a singular timeline. Sylvie wants to kill him, but Loki pleads with her to stop. They kiss, but Sylvie sends Loki back to TVA headquarters. She ultimately kills He Who Remains, unleashing a multiverse with alternate timelines that the TVA cannot prune. At TVA headquarters, Loki warns Mobius and B-15 about He Who Remains' variants, but they do not recognize him and Loki sees that a statue of one of the variants (Note: Identified off-screen following the episode's release by production designer Kasra Farahani as Kang the Conqueror, which was meant to indicate Loki was "in a different place... [and] timeline". The second season premiere "Ouroboros" (2023), however, revealed the statue to be of He Who Remains in the TVA's past.) has replaced statues of the Time-Keepers.

== Cast and characters ==
- Tom Hiddleston as Loki:
  The Asgardian god of mischief and Thor's adopted brother, based on the Norse mythological deity of the same name. This is an alternate, "time variant" version of Loki who created a new timeline in Avengers: Endgame (2019) beginning in 2012. Because of this, he has not gone through the events of Thor: The Dark World (2013) or Thor: Ragnarok (2017), which reformed the previously villainous character before his death in Avengers: Infinity War (2018). Hiddleston expressed interest in returning to the role to explore Loki's powers, particularly his shapeshifting, which plays into the series' exploration of identity. Loki's sex in the series is denoted by the Time Variance Authority as "fluid", referencing the character's genderfluidity in Marvel Comics that had previously been speculated on for the MCU given his shapeshifting ability. Waldron said he was aware of how many people identify with Loki's genderfluidity and were "eager for that representation". The season also reveals Loki as bisexual, becoming the first major queer character in the MCU, and also explores more of Loki's magical abilities, such as his telekinesis and energy blasts.
  - Hiddleston also portrays President Loki, another variant of Loki who commands an army and is at odds with Kid Loki. Hiddleston called President Loki "the worst of the bad bunch", describing him as "the least vulnerable, the most autocratic and terrifyingly ambitious character who seems to have no empathy or care for anyone else".
- Gugu Mbatha-Raw as Ravonna Renslayer:
  The former TVA Hunter A-23 who rose from the ranks to become a respected judge; she oversees the Loki variant investigation. Director Kate Herron compared both Mbatha-Raw and Renslayer to chameleons, and said Renslayer was always "trying to dance the line" with Mobius of being both his superior and his friend. Herron added that Mbatha-Raw brought a warmth to Renslayer, while also channeling her pain. Loki explores the origins of Renslayer, which predates the character's appearances in the comics, and Mbatha-Raw enjoyed being able to start "something fresh" with the character. Mbatha-Raw called Renslayer "incredibly ambitious" and felt there was the "ultimate personality clash" between her and Loki. She continued that Renslayer has "a lot on her shoulders" and has to make "morally ambiguous choices", which forces the character to keep secrets and build up layers. Waldron believed that Renslayer had "the making of a very complex villain".
  - Mbatha-Raw also portrays Rebecca Tourminet, a vice-principal at a school in Fremont, Ohio, in 2018. Learning that there were different variants of Renslayer in different times was "mind blowing" to Mbatha-Raw.
- Wunmi Mosaku as Hunter B-15: A high-ranking Hunter of the TVA determined to stop the variant that has been killing Minutemen troops.
- Eugene Cordero as Casey: A TVA receptionist. Cordero also portrays Hunter K-5E in the new TVA seen at the end of the season.
- Tara Strong voices Miss Minutes:
  The animated anthropomorphic clock mascot of the TVA. After being created solely to introduce the TVA, the writers found more ways to include Miss Minutes in the season since they found her to be a fun character. Miss Minutes has a "protective" relationship to He Who Remains, with Strong believing she understands "how important her role is and how important it is to the universe".
- Owen Wilson as Mobius M. Mobius:
  An agent of the TVA who specializes in the investigations of particularly dangerous time criminals. Marvel Studios president Kevin Feige noted that the character is similar to Wilson in that he is unfazed by the MCU; Hiddleston helped Wilson prepare for the role by explaining and showing him moments from the MCU films, which Wilson felt was useful for when Mobius interviews Loki in the season. Wilson and Herron examined Good Will Hunting (1997) as inspiration for Mobius being a mentor and therapist for Loki who still pushes him.
- Sophia Di Martino as Sylvie:
  A variant of Loki who is attacking the "Sacred Timeline" and has enchantment powers. She does not consider herself to be a Loki, using the name "Sylvie" as an alias. While Sylvie was inspired by Sylvie Lushton / Enchantress and Lady Loki from the comics, she is a different person with a different backstory from those characters as well as Hiddleston's Loki. Di Martino said Hiddleston had "looked after" her and gave her advice on playing the character, while she did her own research and preparation for the role. Di Martino kept her regional accent for Sylvie, to not sound "too posh or too well spoken" to help reflect the life Sylvie had lived. Hiddleston felt Di Martino incorporated "certain characteristics" he uses for Loki to portray Sylvie, while still making the character "completely her own". Herron believed that Sylvie dealing with her pain put her in a similar headspace as Loki was in Thor (2011). Di Martino looked to the fight scenes of Atomic Blonde (2017) to create Sylvie's fighting style, calling her a "street fighter" with more of a brawler fighting style, compared to Loki's "balletic" style. An extensive backstory for the character was written by series' writer Elissa Karasik, with Waldron hopeful some of the material could be featured in the second season. Cailey Fleming portrays a young Sylvie.
- Sasha Lane as Hunter C-20: A TVA Hunter kidnapped and enchanted by Sylvie to reveal the location of the Time-Keepers.
- Jack Veal as Kid Loki: A young variant of Loki who created a Nexus event by killing Thor and considers himself the king of the Void.
- DeObia Oparei as Boastful Loki: A Loki variant who makes wild exaggerations about his accomplishments.
- Richard E. Grant as Classic Loki:
  An old Loki variant who faked his death to escape being killed by Thanos and decided to live his life in seclusion until he became lonely. Classic Loki can conjure larger, more elaborate illusions than Loki.
- Jonathan Majors as He Who Remains:
  A scientist from the 31st century who ended the first multiversal war by destroying "evil variants" of himself, and created the TVA to prevent a new multiverse from forming and to keep his variants from coming back into existence. He is an original creation for the series, inspired by a separate comic book character of the same name as well as the character Immortus. Describing He Who Remains as a "very charismatic sociopath", Waldron did not show how evil the character can be since much of his role is trying to convince others that his variants are worse than him. Majors talked with Herron and Marvel Studios about finding the psychology of the character, since He Who Remains has been in isolation and running the TVA for so long. Herron added that they tried to find "that fine line between the extrovert and the introvert of that character and how does he show that he's been living on his own". Majors used his classical clown training for the part, and believed that he smiled more as He Who Remains than any of his other roles combined. Additionally, he was inspired by The Wizard of Oz (1939), Sunset Boulevard (1950), Citizen Kane (1941), and Willy Wonka & the Chocolate Factory (1971) for his portrayal, believing He Who Remains was the "archetype of the wizard and what happens to him when he gets bored... [a]nd he becomes a trickster".
  - Majors also voices the "mindless android" Time-Keepers, in a reference to The Wizard of Oz where they are the Wizard. Majors was shown the designs of each Time-Keeper and provided various options for each voice.

Neil Ellice recurs in the season as TVA Hunter D-90, while Jaimie Alexander and Chris Hemsworth have uncredited appearances as Sif and the voice of Throg, respectively.

== Production ==
=== Development ===
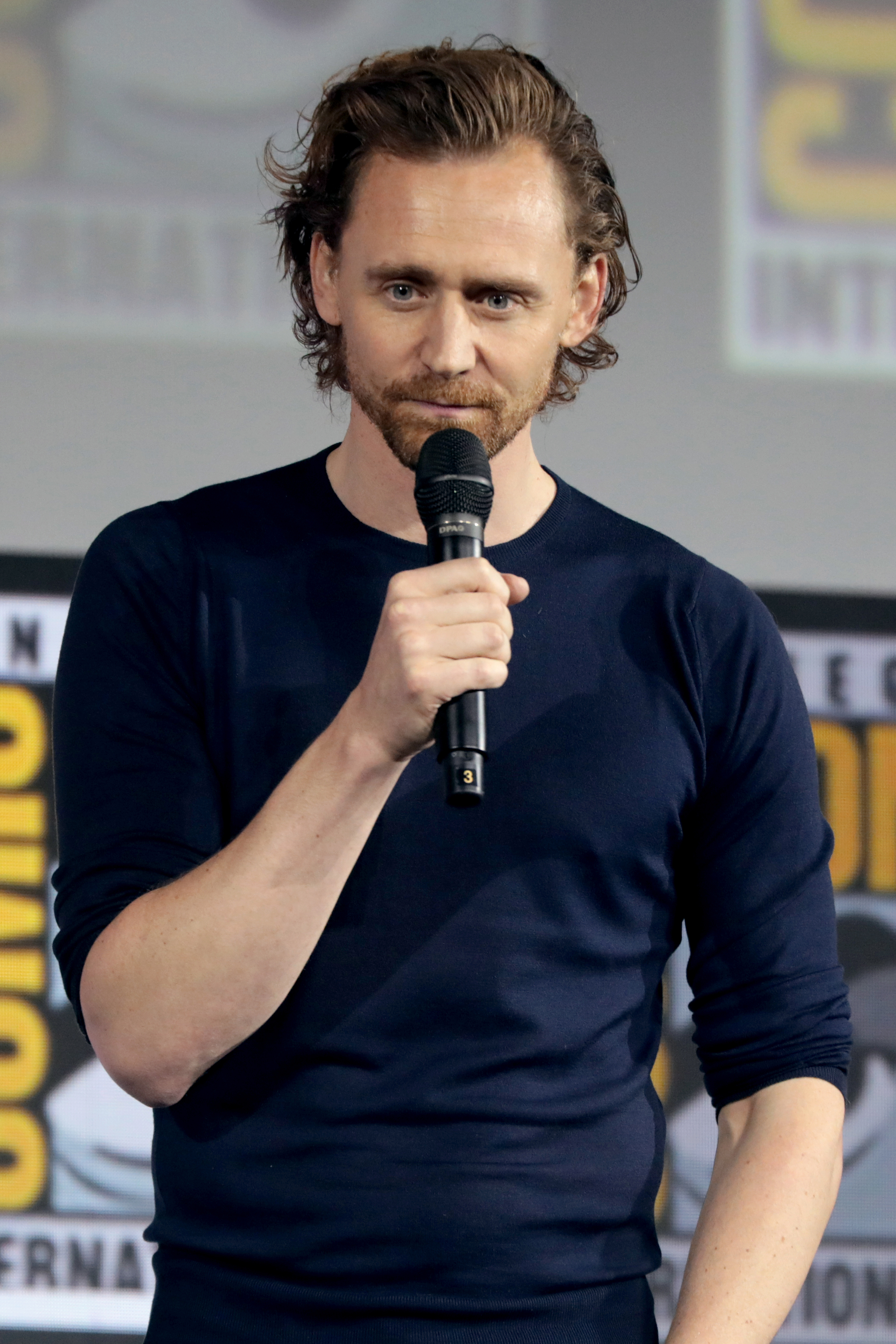
Hiddleston promoting the series at the 2019 San Diego Comic-Con

In November 2018, Disney CEO Bob Iger confirmed that a series centered on Loki was in development for Disney+ from Marvel Studios and that Tom Hiddleston was expected to reprise his role from the Marvel Cinematic Universe (MCU) films. Michael Waldron was hired as head writer and executive producer of the series in February 2019, and was also set to write the first episode. Waldron felt the series was an opportunity for "chaos and fun", such as connecting Loki to the story of D. B. Cooper, and his pitch to Marvel was to create a "big, crazy, fun time adventure" that would explore a new corner of the MCU and do something unexpected in each episode that would "blow up" the audience's ideas of what the series is.Waldron had assumed the audience was expecting the show to be similar to Quantum Leap (1989–1993), with Loki influencing historical events. Kate Herron, a fan of Loki, prepared a 60-page document for her pitch to be the series' director, feeling that a display of passion for the character would differentiate her from more experienced directors who were being considered. After developing her pitch during several interviews over Zoom with Marvel Studios executives Kevin R. Wright and Stephen Broussard, the London-based Herron was flown to Burbank for a meeting with top executives including Feige, Victoria Alonso, and Louis D'Esposito. Wright believed Herron's pitch had a "complete vision" of how to take the ideas for the series and turn them into something "wholly unique" to the MCU. In August 2019, Feige met with Herron in London to offer her the job as director for the series. Within 48 hours, she flew to New York to meet Hiddleston and discuss the character with him, and then went on to Disney's D23 Expo event, where she was announced as director and executive producer. Part of Herron's agreement to join the series was ensuring there was gender parity amongst the crew, particularly with the department heads. Daniel Kwan and Daniel Scheinert had also been approached to direct the season, but opted to pursue their own film project, Everything Everywhere All at Once (2022), which also dealt with multiversal concepts.

After Waldron signed on to write the MCU film Doctor Strange in the Multiverse of Madness (2022) in February 2020, writer Eric Martin was promoted to handle the day-to-day needs of the series, including being the lead writer on set, with Waldron and Martin later collaborating on any rewrites for the series. The first season consists of six 40- to 50-minute episodes, equaling 280 minutes total. In addition to Waldron and Herron, executive producers for the series include Feige, D'Esposito, Alonso, Broussard, and Hiddleston. The season sees an alternate version of Loki brought to the mysterious Time Variance Authority (TVA) to help fix the timeline and stop a greater threat, ending up trapped in a crime thriller of his own making, traveling through time and altering human history.

=== Writing ===
Elissa Karasik, Bisha K. Ali, Eric Martin, and Tom Kauffman served as writers for the season, with Jess Dweck also assisting, working for 20 weeks to create the season's scripts. Waldron found this period challenging because he also had to write the pilot episode, which is normally done in a separate development period before additional writers are hired, to establish the world of the series while conceiving story elements for the rest of the episodes. The basic structure of the season was determined in the first three weeks of work, knowing the first episode would see Loki interrogated, the second having "the police work" with Mobius M. Mobius, the third would see Loki and his female variant Sylvie on Lamentis, the fourth had "the conspiracy coming undone", the fifth would take place in the Void or "some form of it", and the final episode would be at the Citadel at the End of Time.

The season takes place after Avengers: Endgame (2019), which saw Loki steal the Tesseract during the 2012 events of The Avengers (2012) and unwittingly create an alternate timeline from the main MCU films. In the season, this "time variant" of Loki travels through time and alters human history, with the season exploring the questions "Where did Loki go after he picked up the Tesseract? Could Loki ever make a friend? [W]ill the sun ever shine on him again?". Exploring alternate timelines and the multiverse allowed Loki to introduce versions of other MCU characters in addition to other versions of Loki. Waldron also hoped to explore more complex character questions, such as what makes a person "truly good or truly bad", and what makes a hero, a hero, or a villain, a villain. He added that the season's setting in an alternate timeline meant it did not have to deal with the "immediate grief and aftermath" of Endgame and could instead "blaze a little bit of a new trail into a new corner of the MCU", which differentiates it from Marvel Studios' previous two Disney+ series WandaVision and The Falcon and the Winter Soldier (both 2021) that are set shortly after Endgame.

Waldron's pitch for the season was to create "a big, crazy, fun time adventure" that would explore a new corner of the MCU, something Herron agreed with. This included introducing the Time Variance Authority (TVA), an organization that monitors the various timelines of the multiverse. Feige and Broussard had hoped to introduce the TVA into the MCU for years, but the right opportunity did not present itself until Loki. The introduction of the TVA convinced Hiddleston to make the series. Waldron felt the organization was fun because it presents something as "remarkable" as time travel as "soulless" and bureaucratic. Herron infused the season's depiction of the TVA with details and knowledge from her time as a temp worker, and the writers added "fun flourishes of discontinued things" from the past that the TVA would be able to access such as drinks from the 1990s like Josta and BoKu. The hierarchy of the TVA and its "inner workings" are explored, with The Hudsucker Proxy (1994) a reference for Herron on the hierarchy.

Our approach with time travel was the philosophy basically that time is always happening. So there are infinite instances of time always occurring at once. So you and I are having this conversation right now. There's another instance of us having this conversation 10 seconds ago. There's another instance of time of us having this conversation 10 seconds in the future. Generally, those three instances—you could literally say they're all different universes in a way[,] different timelines—are all the same. There are minute little fluctuations in each instance of time... different permutations and instances [always] happening. The TVA has their own barometer, their own gauge of what constitutes a deviation from the baseline, the way it's supposed to go [to produce] He Who Remains... If you zoomed in on the timeline, it wouldn't necessarily look like a straight line. It might look like almost the intertwined strands of a rope fluctuating and spiking here and there. When it becomes a problem for the TVA is when, according to their own rules, when could something branch off in a way that it could actually produce a new timeline that could produce a new version of He Who Remains? That is the practical thing that they're guarding against.

— Head writer Michael Waldron explaining the series' approach to time travel, the multiverse, and the mission of He Who Remains and the TVA to Matt Singer of ScreenCrush

The writers worked to conceive how time travel works at the TVA, ensuring the audience could easily grasp the concept and rules, while expanding upon the method introduced in Avengers: Endgame. Waldron felt it was important to make this logic air-tight because, being a weekly series, the audience would have a week between each episode to "pick this apart". Speaking to the locations visited in the season, Waldron hoped to subvert the audience's expectations of Loki appearing at various monumental events in history, instead choosing to go places the audience knows "but didn't know well and maybe might be exciting to see". Waldron said while there was a lot of creative freedom in the MCU, the one idea that Marvel Studios objected to was including the Mojoverse, a location commonly associated with the X-Men, in the Void.

Waldron felt that exploring the TVA's perspective on time and reality would help examine Loki's struggle with identity. He noted that the character had been out of control at pivotal parts of his life throughout the MCU films, and the TVA's place working with different timelines would take him further out of his comfort zone. Waldron explained that the nature of the work done by the TVA made the organization "uniquely suited to hold up a mirror to Loki and make him confront who he is and who he is supposed to be". Hiddleston also felt the season was about identity, as well as the difficulty of self-knowledge and self-acceptance, and "integrating the disparate fragments of the many selves that [Loki] can be", pointing to the series' logo, which features the "Loki" title shifting through various fonts, as an indication of this. As well, Hiddleston believed Loki was about the value of time and what it is worth to a person. Broussard stated that in addition to the time travel element, the season would have a "man-on-the-run quality to it", with Waldron adding that there was an unexpected science fiction quality to the season, which also explores mysterious conspiracies and bending reality. Loki also has murder mystery thriller elements. Love stories are also a part of the season, with Waldron highlighting the platonic love story between Loki and Mobius that is similar to the one between the characters Carl Hanratty and Frank Abagnale Jr. in Catch Me If You Can (2002). The season also sees Loki fall in love with Sylvie. This was a large part of Waldron's pitch for the series, noting they were uncertain if portraying Loki falling in love with another version of himself was "too crazy". He continued noting Loki was "ultimately about self-love, self-reflection, and forgiving yourself" and it "felt right" for the series to be the character's first "real love story".

Waldron said the season was structured as individual short stories rather than a six-hour film split into episodes, comparing his approach to the series The Leftovers (2014–2017) and Watchmen (2019). The series Mad Men (2007–2015) was a philosophical and aesthetic inspiration for Loki, since Waldron believed it was a good example of a "rich character study" which is what he was aiming for in Loki. Other inspirations include Before Sunrise (1995), Catch Me If You Can, Quentin Tarantino films, David Fincher films like Seven (1995) and Zodiac (2007), The Silence of the Lambs (1991), Toy Story (1995), Armageddon (1998), the series Lost (2004–2010), and the animated series Rick and Morty (2013–present), which Waldron was a writer on. Loki does not adapt a particular storyline from the comics, despite various comic references appearing. The Kid Loki story in Journey into Mystery, written by Kieron Gillen, was an inspiration to Waldron because it explored the character's humanity in a vulnerable space that is only possible with a child (and not necessarily because there is a child version of Loki in the season).

Feige stated in November 2019 that the season would tie-into Doctor Strange in the Multiverse of Madness, but ahead of the season's premiere, he would not reconfirm this or whether the season would tie in with any other MCU projects. However, he did say the season would be "tremendously important" and would "lay the groundwork" for the future of the MCU, having more impact on the MCU than WandaVision or The Falcon and the Winter Soldier did. Waldron noted that, as with all MCU properties, the aim was for Loki to have "wide-reaching ramifications" across the franchise. He collaborated closely with Jeff Loveness, the writer of the MCU film Ant-Man and the Wasp: Quantumania (2023), since that film deals with the Quantum Realm and is closely tied to the multiverse. As well, Ali became the head writer of the Marvel Studios miniseries Ms. Marvel (2022). The "man behind the curtain" of the TVA is revealed to be He Who Remains, a variant of the Quantumania character Kang the Conqueror. Jonathan Majors portrays both roles, and Waldron felt it made "so much sense" to introduce Majors in the season since Kang is a "time-traveling, multiversal adversary" and thought to be the "next big cross-movie villain". Marvel Studios was not initially planning to have "The Multiverse Saga", which comprises Phase Four, Phase Five, and Phase Six, revolve around Kang, but decided to after seeing Majors' performance in the season finale and the dailies while filming Quantumania.

The finale also sets up the events of Doctor Strange in the Multiverse of Madness, and elements of Spider-Man: No Way Home (2021). Broussard and Wright also met with Brad Winderbaum, executive producer of the animated What If...? series (2021–2024) and WandaVision co-executive producer Mary Livanos to establish a "rule book" regarding the multiverse, its branch timelines, and nexus events. Chancellor Agard of Entertainment Weekly said that, while some MCU properties "have dealt with the fallout from previous entries", none have ever "attempted something so ambitious like this, in which several movies are dealing with a problem created by one thing".

=== Casting ===
With the November 2018 announcement of the series, Hiddleston was expected to reprise his role as Loki, with his involvement confirmed in February 2019 by Walt Disney Studios chairman Alan F. Horn. In September 2019, Sophia Di Martino was cast in the "highly contested" role of Sylvie, a female variant of Loki. Waldron wanted to cast an actress in the role that matched the energy that Hiddleston brought to Loki, and described Di Martino as an accomplished British actress with not much familiarity to U.S. audiences whose prior work had "blown [him] away". In January 2020, Owen Wilson joined the cast as a "prominent character", later revealed to be Mobius M. Mobius, with Gugu Mbatha-Raw cast the following month as the female lead Ravonna Renslayer, also said to be a "prominent character".

In March 2020, Richard E. Grant was cast as Classic Loki, reportedly for a single episode of the series. That September, Jonathan Majors was cast as Kang the Conqueror for the film Ant-Man and the Wasp: Quantumania, with executives at Marvel Studios, Quantumania director Peyton Reed, Waldron, and Herron all involved in the casting since Majors was set to first appear in Loki as a variant of Kang called He Who Remains. When casting for the role, Waldron hoped to find someone "charismatic and magnetic" who would draw audiences in with the part, as he does with Loki and Sylvie in the series. Marvel Studios were eager to work with and cast Majors after seeing his performance in The Last Black Man in San Francisco (2019). Though this variant is not Kang, Herron noted that the series "sets the table for [his] future outings" and called it "a massive responsibility and privilege" to introduce the character. Sasha Lane was also revealed to have been cast as Hunter C-20 by the end of the month. In December, Wunmi Mosaku's casting was revealed, with Mosaku playing Hunter B-15.

In April 2021, Eugene Cordero was revealed to be appearing in the series as Casey, and later Hunter K-5E, while voice actress Tara Strong was revealed to be voicing Miss Minutes with the series' premiere. Strong, who had to audition for the role, originally created three versions of the character to present to the creative team: one where she did the character with an accent, one that was "a little bit more A.I." and "Siri-like", and one that had some more emotion. Jack Veal and DeObia Oparei also star as the Loki variants Kid Loki and Boastful Loki, respectively.

Hiddleston also portrays President Loki, another variant of Loki who commands an army and is at odds with Kid Loki, Mbatha-Raw also portrays Rebecca Tourminet, a vice-principal at a school in Fremont, Ohio, in 2018, and Majors also voices the "mindless android" Time-Keepers. Neil Ellice recurs in the season as Hunter D-90. By December 2020, Jaimie Alexander was reported to be reprising her role as Sif in the series from past Thor films; she makes an uncredited cameo appearance in the season. Chris Hemsworth, who portrays Thor in the MCU, also has an uncredited cameo in the series, providing voiceover for Throg.

=== Design ===
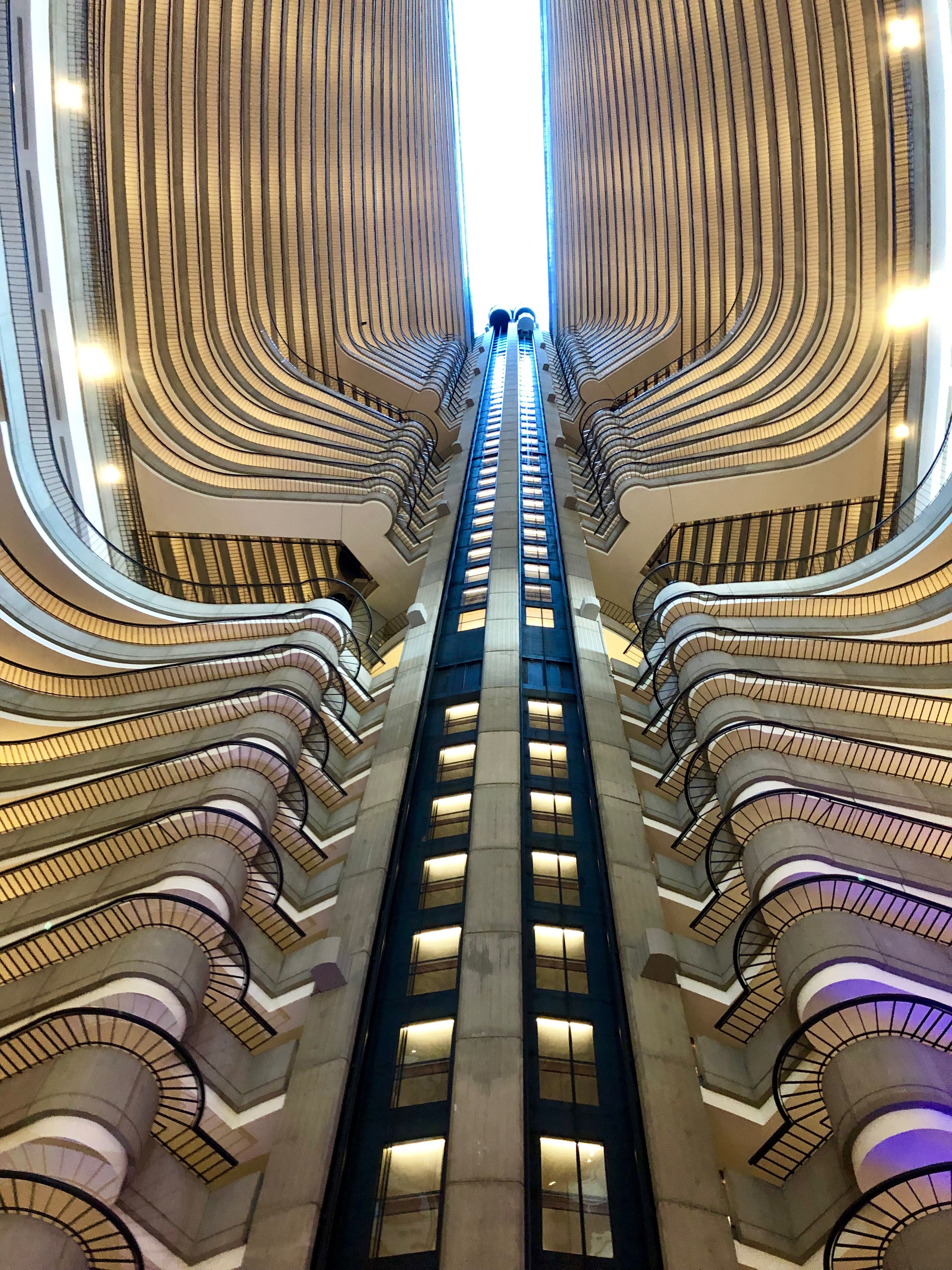
The Atlanta Marriott Marquis (top) was used to portray the Time Variance Authority, which helped create the visuals of infinity that Herron was drawn to from the comics (bottom).

Herron worked with costume designer Christine Wada to create costumes that were "an outer reflection of the inner story" and would reflect the "wear and tear" throughout the series. Loki has a multitude of costumes in the series that reflect his journey. Mobius' look in the series is meant to resemble Marvel Comics editor Mark Gruenwald, who was Marvel's "top continuity expert", as each member of the TVA in the comics is meant to be a clone of Gruenwald. Herron had initially imagined Mobius to have a scruffy look, but she and Wilson decided that it was not working. Wilson remembered a time he was on Saturday Night Live (1975–present) with silver hair and felt that would be an interesting direction to take the character; that ended up being part of the character's look. Di Martino noted Sylvie's "slightly disheveled" costume and broken horn headband were meant to help reflect the life she has had, with the costume and headband being similar to the Lady Loki design that appears in the Loki: Agent of Asgard comic series (2014–2015). Wada added concealed zippers to Di Martino's costume to allow her to breastfeed on set since Di Martino began work on the season four months after giving birth.

For the design for the TVA, Herron pulled visual inspiration from the films Metropolis (1927), Blade Runner (1982), and The Hitchhiker's Guide to the Galaxy (2005), and the Brutalist architecture of southeast London to mix with the "midwest style" of the series Mad Men. She also looked to the "retro-futuristic" visuals of Brazil (1985). From the comics, Herron was drawn to "these amazing images of desks going on into infinity" to incorporate into the TVA design. Production designer Kasra Farahani had similar inclinations as Herron for the design of the TVA, separately feeling Brazil would be a good inspiration since that film is "like this big bureaucracy crushing the individual". As with the Brutalist architecture Herron was drawn to, Farahani also looked to Soviet-influenced Eastern European midcentury modernism as well as American midcentury modernism for "the skinning, the palette, and the whimsical patterns" inside the TVA. Some parts of the TVA are constructed from the same stone that makes up the Citadel at the End of Time. The goal for Farahani was to create a space that "you can't tell immediately if this is a warm and friendly place or if it's a place that wants to destroy you".

The TVA includes "elaborate ceilings", with Farahani working alongside cinematographer Autumn Durald Arkapaw to incorporate lighting into them; when Arkapaw shot from a low angle, it produced "beautiful graphic frames with dynamic shapes in almost every background". Farahani described the technology of the TVA as if "analog technology never stopped and digital technology never happened", with the analog technology getting "more and more sophisticated"; this helped with the anachronistic feel of the organization. The various screens in the TVA do not feature color, instead having a monochromatic, 8-bit digitized look. Much of the technology was custom built from old televisions and computers that were combined with "disparate, other random pieces of tech", while the TemPads were inspired by calculator watches and their interfaces inspired by the Super Nintendo Entertainment System and Game Boy Camera. The world outside the TVA offices is depicted as an infinite city with inspiration from Metropolis and imagery of infinite spaces from the comic books, which Herron wanted to have a "level of unreality to it in some ways ... [because] it isn't on a planet and there isn't a sun". The majority of the season's locations and sets were 360-degree-builds on sound stages or a backlot with ceilings and integrated lighting, which gave Farahani greater control over the details and other aspects of the sets; Marvel Studios was initially hesitant to build the sets like this since they had not done a lot of full sets previously.

The series' main-on-end title sequence design was designed by Perception, and was inspired by the credits sequence of Seven. Loki was not originally intended to have a title sequence, but Herron enjoyed composer Natalie Holt's TVA theme so much, she decided a title sequence should be created around it.

=== Filming ===
Filming began on February 10, 2020, at Pinewood Atlanta Studios in Fayette County, Georgia, with Herron directing, and Autumn Durald Arkapaw serving as cinematographer. The first season was filmed under the working title Architect. This was chosen as a reference to the Architect in The Matrix Reloaded (2003) and to serve as "[a] warning not to repeat what was done before us" since much of the season is expositional conversation and they did not want it to become the conversation between Neo and the Architect in Reloaded. Herron had a strong desire for Loki to be a love letter to science fiction films such as Brazil, Metropolis, The Hitchhiker's Guide to the Galaxy, and Alien (1979). She also took visual inspiration from the series Teletubbies (1997–2001), and the noir quality of Blade Runner. Arkapaw also drew inspiration from Blade Runner as well as Zodiac and Klute (1971). She used framing and lighting, "very 70s" filmmaking techniques, to help with the storytelling and was thoughtful on "how characters are moving through space", as well as haze. Herron pointed to Jurassic Park (1993) as an example of the "big sci-fi with heart" tone that the series was aiming for.

The season was shot on Sony Venice digital cameras with Panavision T-series anamorphic lenses. Arkapaw expanded and de-tuned these lenses to adjust their flare quality, fall off, and focal length. Location shooting took place in the Atlanta metropolitan area throughout the month of February. On March 14, filming for the series was halted due to the COVID-19 pandemic. Production resumed at Pinewood Atlanta Studios in September, and wrapped on December 5, 2020. The Atlanta Marriott Marquis portrayed the archives at the Time Variance Authority. On the TVA processing set, Arkapaw used working frosted incandescent ceiling lights as the set's key lights. Other Georgia locations used for filming included a quarry in northern Georgia that became the Lamentis-1 mining town and a vacant discount store that became the futuristic superstore, Roxxcart. Industrial Light & Magic's StageCraft technology was not considered for the series, with Farahani stating it was not "creatively super-relevant" for what was desired.

=== Post-production ===
Herron began editing what had already been filmed during the production shutdown, which helped inform her, Martin, and Wright on what needed to be reworked or added once filming resumed to fit the series' intended tone. One of these aspects was Loki and Sylvie's relationship. Paul Zucker, Calum Ross, and Emma McCleave serve as editors. The series was completed on June 20, 2021. Visual effects were provided by Cantina Creative, Crafty Apes, Digital Domain, FuseFX, Industrial Light & Magic, Luma Pictures, Method Studios, Rise, Rodeo FX, and Trixter. The TVA's time doors were inspired by the shield practice scene from Dune (1984), with 150 versions of how the doors appeared created to test which would work the best.

=== Music ===
External videos
- Natalie Holt – TVA (From "Loki") presents composer Natalie Holt's TVA theme along with the end credit sequence, YouTube video from MarvelMusicVevo's channel

Natalie Holt began working on a "suite of themes" for Loki, Mobius, the TVA, and Sylvie in August 2020, starting with music for the final episode and working backward to the first episode, which helped create a "blueprint" for her score that had an "overarching narrative". Herron used these samples of music to help "shape the tone" and emotions of the series. Holt and Herron were both drawn to using the theremin for the series' music, with Holt believing the instrument's "character" was suited for the series and the score. Charlie Draper served as the theremin player on the score, assisting Holt with converting the score to the instrument's lower bass range. Holt's score combines the theremin with an orchestra (performed by the Budapest Film Orchestra), analog synthesizers, clock sounds, and Scandinavian folk instruments, much of which was created and contributed remotely while Holt worked in her studio in London. The scores for the final two episodes also feature a 32-person choir. Herron said Holt's music for Loki was "operatic and bold", as well as "very layered and electronic with a dark, strange energy" that was a good fit for the character.

Likening Loki to a Machiavellian character, Holt wanted his theme to have "gravitas and classical weight" in addition to a "space-age sound". She cited Wendy Carlos's Moog synthesizer sounds in A Clockwork Orange (1971) as an influence, since Holt saw similarities between Loki and that film's protagonist Alex. Holt also wanted to "juxtapose" and "interplay" Loki's theme with the TVA theme. Clock sounds were included since the concept of time was central to the series, and they appear in the TVA theme which Holt wanted to be "grand, almost like a religious experience" with "these huge swells of cords" and "ornaments and grand gestures", taking inspiration from "Ride of the Valkyries" by Richard Wagner. The theme has a "slightly grainy, faded [and] vintage-y sci-fi sound" to reflect the analog nature of the TVA, with Holt creating a "low-fi demo version" of the theme that was mainly synthesizers and had an analog tape sound that was kept for the opening title cards, while the full orchestral version of the theme was used for the end title sequence.

The Norwegian instruments, including the hardanger fiddle and stringed nyckelharpa, were used to represent Asgard and Loki's mother Frigga, as well as Sylvie's theme, which Holt described as "very dark, orchestral, driving, and murderous". Sylvie and Frigga's themes are connected, and Holt wanted to "feel that sense of past and sense of history and this emotional grounding" between the two. Frigga's theme was originally written on the violin, with Norwegian player Erik Rydvall aiding Holt by playing the theme on the hardanger fiddle and adding "some heart" and folk ornamentation. For Mobius, Holt listened to Bon Jovi and other 1990s rock music to create his "sound palette", while Renslayer's theme is "like a high organ" and is tied to Mobius's. Hunter B-15's theme was based in a drum rhythm, with Holt sampling her voice in various layers to create "this horrible sliding sound with this driving rhythm underneath it".

The score for the season was released digitally by Marvel Music and Hollywood Records in two volumes: music from the first three episodes was released on July 2, 2021, and music from the last three episodes was released on July 23. The first episode's end credits track "TVA" was released as a single on June 11.

Loki: Vol. 1 (Episodes 1–3) [Original Soundtrack]
| No. | Title | Music | Length |
|---|---|---|---|
| 1. | "TVA" | | 2:28 |
| 2. | "New York, 2012" | | 1:30 |
| 3. | "Gobi, 2012" | | 3:00 |
| 4. | "TVA First View" | | 1:06 |
| 5. | "Loki Green Theme" | | 2:24 |
| 6. | "Loki Processing" | | 2:16 |
| 7. | "Aix-En-Provence, 1549" | | 2:34 |
| 8. | "Miss Minutes" | | 2:00 |
| 9. | "Mischievous Scamp" | | 1:28 |
| 10. | "Dangerous Variant" | | 1:37 |
| 11. | "Frigga" | | 2:21 |
| 12. | "TVA Inner Workings" | | 1:48 |
| 13. | "DB Cooper" | | 1:35 |
| 14. | "Oshkosh, 1985" | | 1:53 |
| 15. | "Catch Up" | | 1:38 |
| 16. | "Jet Ski" | | 2:11 |
| 17. | "Glorious Purpose" | | 2:34 |
| 18. | "The Archives" | | 2:08 |
| 19. | "Salina, 1858" | | 1:39 |
| 20. | "Roxxcart, 2050" | | 2:06 |
| 21. | "I Miss Randy" | | 1:52 |
| 22. | "Reset Charges" | | 2:27 |
| 23. | "TVA Title Card" | | 1:38 |
| 24. | "Very Full" (featuring Tom Hiddleston) | Benedicte Maurseth and Erlend O. Nødtvedt | 1:26 |
| 25. | "Lamentis-1, 2077" | | 1:54 |
| Total length: | | | 49:33 |

Loki: Vol. 2 (Episodes 4–6) [Original Soundtrack]
| No. | Title | Length |
|---|---|---|
| 1. | "Headless" | 2:17 |
| 2. | "Temptation" | 2:12 |
| 3. | "Pep Talk" | 4:04 |
| 4. | "Wild" | 4:05 |
| 5. | "Time Loop" | 2:13 |
| 6. | "Lokius" | 3:00 |
| 7. | "Alligator Bite" | 3:11 |
| 8. | "God of Outcasts" | 2:53 |
| 9. | "Reunion" | 2:37 |
| 10. | "Secret Hide Out" | 1:51 |
| 11. | "Goodbyes" | 3:26 |
| 12. | "Living Storm" | 2:18 |
| 13. | "Classic Builds" (includes elements of "Ride of the Valkyries" by Richard Wagner) | 2:41 |
| 14. | "Time" | 2:35 |
| 15. | "Pruned" | 2:44 |
| 16. | "Ravonna's Mission" | 2:07 |
| 17. | "B15's Memories" | 1:24 |
| 18. | "Ohio, 2018" | 2:55 |
| 19. | "Fibbed" | 4:12 |
| 20. | "Stop" | 3:17 |
| 21. | "Be" | 4:58 |
| 22. | "Back in the TVA" | 2:12 |
| 23. | "He Who Remains" | 2:55 |
| Total length: | | 66:17 |

==== Charts ====
Weekly chart performance for Loki: Vol. 1 (Episodes 1–3) [Original Soundtrack] and Loki: Vol. 2 (Episodes 4–6) [Original Soundtrack]
| Chart (2021) | Vol. 1 peak position | Vol. 2 peak position |
|---|---|---|
| UK Album Downloads (OCC) | 34 | 37 |
| UK Soundtrack Albums (OCC) | 15 | 18 |

== Marketing ==
Select members of Disney's marketing team were given access to scripts and information on the season when it began filming to start crafting its marketing campaign based on its release date. Asad Ayaz, Walt Disney Studios marketing president, and his team worked closely with Feige, D'Esposito, Herron, and Waldron to determine what information would be part of the campaign, while coordinating around the efforts of previous Disney+ series that were releasing before Loki to give those their "fair time". A commercial for the season, The Falcon and the Winter Soldier, and WandaVision was shown during Super Bowl LIV. Julia Alexander of The Verge said the footage "wasn't much" but offered "enough glimpses to tease fans". Haleigh Foutch at Collider felt of all the Super Bowl commercials, Marvel's teasers "stole the whole show" and had "a lot to get excited about".

A trailer for the season was released during Disney Investor Day in December 2020. Writers for Polygon said Loki "finally feels untethered by the grounded approaches of the early Thor movies", and based on the content of the trailer and given the season deals with alternate realities, the season might try to "explain" certain phenomena such as Loki being D. B. Cooper or features worlds where urban legends such as the fictitious video game Polybius exist. John Boon writing for Entertainment Tonight called the trailer a "bonkers first look". /Film's Hoai-Tran Bui said the scenes in the trailer was "very intriguing, cryptic stuff" and was surprised to learn the season was more than "just the time-hopping series we assumed" and would deal "with mysterious conspiracies and reality-bending organizations".

A second trailer for the series was released on April 5, 2021. Charles Pulliam-Moore of io9 called the trailer "a large-scale, time-hopping adventure with the promise to be Disney+'s next big epic". Pulliam-Moore's colleague Jame Whitbrook said the trailer was "big on mystery" and was clearer than the first about the TVA's role in the series, but it was still unclear what Loki gained "beyond the chance to enact his own brand of chaos across an entire multiverse of timelines". Polygon's Austen Goslin said it appeared Loki would be visiting past memorable moments from MCU films, calling Loki "a sci-fi, reality-hopping, heist series". Bui felt this trailer gave a better understanding of how Loki would get involved with the TVA than the first trailer did.

A poster for the season was revealed in May 2021, which featured Loki, Mobius M. Mobius, Ravonna Lexus Renslayer, and Hunter B-15, as well as Miss Minutes, the animated anthropomorphic orange clock that is the TVA's mascot. Commentators were drawn to Miss Minutes, thinking it would be viewers' favorite new character, with /Film's Chris Evangelista loving the mascot despite its weirdness and not being convinced it was a clock. Erin Brady at Collider thought Miss Minutes could "try to steal Baby Yoda's thunder", while Adele Ankers of IGN believed the mascot was a hint towards the various realities the season would explore, despite not knowing what role Miss Minutes would have in the series. Two episodes of the series Marvel Studios: Legends were released on June 4, 2021, exploring Loki and the Tesseract using footage from their MCU film appearances. On July 9, a ceramic piece by João Lemos and the Viúva Lamego ceramic factory debuted in Marquês de Pombal Square in Lisbon. Crafting a campaign for a television series, rather a film's opening weekend, necessitated Ayaz and his team to be cognizant of spoilers in the lead up to Loki's release, while new marketing materials released post-episodes covered characters or moments revealed in the previous episode. In June 2021, The Simpsons short film The Good, the Bart, and the Loki was announced, which would release alongside "Journey into Mystery" on Disney+. The short sees Loki teaming up with Bart Simpson in a crossover that pays homage to the heroes and villains of the MCU. Hiddleston reprises his role as Loki in the short.

In January 2021, Marvel announced their "Marvel Must Haves" program, which reveals new toys, games, books, apparel, home decor, and other merchandise related to each episode of Loki following an episode's release. The first merchandise was revealed on June 7, 2021, which included Funko Pops, Marvel Legends figures, pins, apparel, and accessories for the series, while General Mills and Marvel announced that they would release 3,500 specially branded boxes of Lucky Charms cereal, titled "Loki Charms", on the same day as the series' release. The "Must Haves" merchandise for the episodes started on June 11 and concluded on July 16. Later in the month, Hyundai Motor Company released a commercial featuring Hiddleston as Loki promoting the series and the Hyundai Tucson. The commercial was produced by Marvel alongside similar commercials for WandaVision, The Falcon and the Winter Soldier, and What If...?, and was meant to tell an "in-world" story set within the narrative of the season. It received 2 million views within 24 hours of its release. With the release of each episode, Loki's appearance and costumes in Disneyland's Avengers Campus were updated each week to reflect the events of the episode.

== Release ==
=== Streaming ===
The first season debuted on Disney+ on June 9, 2021, and was released weekly on Wednesdays, with the six-episode first season concluding on July 14. It is part of Phase Four of the MCU. It had previously been announced to debut in May 2021, before it was shifted to June 11, 2021, for releases on Friday, and then to two days before that.

=== Home media ===
The first season of Loki was released on Ultra HD Blu-ray and Blu-ray by Walt Disney Studios Home Entertainment on September 26, 2023, with SteelBook packaging and concept art cards. Bonus features include "Designing the TVA" with Farahani and Hiddleston, along with a look at the second season; the Miss Minutes TVA orientation video; deleted scenes; a gag reel; and the Marvel Studios: Assembled documentary special "The Making of Loki".

== Reception ==
=== Audience viewership ===
Disney CEO Bob Chapek announced that "Glorious Purpose" was the most-watched series premiere for the streaming service in its opening week. Nielsen Media Research, who measure the number of minutes watched by United States audiences on television sets, listed Loki as the third-most watched original series across streaming services for the week of June 7–13, with "Glorious Purpose" accumulating 731 million minutes viewed, which was more than the premieres of The Falcon and the Winter Soldier (495 million minutes) and WandaVision (434 million). According to Samba TV, "For All Time. Always." was viewed in 1.9 million U.S. households from July 14–18, surpassing the finales of WandaVision (1.4 million) and The Falcon and the Winter Soldier (1.7 million). In May 2022, Feige announced that Loki was the most-watched Marvel Studios Disney+ series to date.

=== Critical response ===
Loki season 1: Critical reception by episode
Season 1 (2021): Percentage of positive critics' reviews tracked by the website Rotten Tomatoes

The review aggregator website Rotten Tomatoes reports a 92% approval rating with an average rating of 7.9/10, based on 332 reviews. The critical consensus reads, "A delightful diversion from the MCU as we know it, Loki successfully sees star Tom Hiddleston leap from beloved villain to endearing antihero—with a little help from Owen Wilson—in a series that's as off-kilter, charming, and vaguely dangerous as the demigod himself." Metacritic, which uses a weighted average, assigned a score of 74 out of 100 based on 32 critics, indicating "generally favorable" reviews.

For the series' first two episodes, reviewers highlighted the banter and relationship between Hiddleston's Loki and Wilson's Mobius. The various design elements of Loki, particularly the production design from Kasra Farahani and the cinematography from Autumn Durald Arkapaw, were also praised.

TVLine's Matt Webb Mitovitch gave the first two episodes a "B+". He felt Hiddleston "effortlessly slips back" into this version of Loki and explained that the banter between Hiddleston and Wilson was "a significant upgrade from what Falcon and Winter Soldier believed it was doing". Mitovitch concluded that once the premise has been established, Loki gets "very fun", with each episode "building to a tantalizing, two-pronged reveal ... that opens up all kinds of possibilities" for the remainder of the series. Daniel Fienberg of The Hollywood Reporter said in his review, "After two episodes, Loki is at a tipping point. Having set everything up to an exhausting degree, things could be lined up to get really entertaining – if not zany in a Rick and Morty way, perhaps fun in some of the timeline rupture-of-the-week ways [of] The CW's Legends of Tomorrow ... Or Loki might just be a lot of Hiddleston and Wilson talking, which might still be engaging for six episodes." Nick Allen, reviewing for RogerEbert.com, called Loki "an exciting and genuinely inspired addition to Marvel storytelling, one that spins off and rockets its complicated villain into original territory with the help of time travel" adding the series was "bound to be a sci-fi gem".

Reviewing the first two episodes for Variety, Caroline Framke was more reserved on how successful the series would be, feeling the "dense" first episode had a lot of ground to cover, while the second "was far more engaging" and able to have more fun, ending on a tease of "an intriguing new direction", though she cautioned that the series may ultimately not "deviate from the usual script". Giving the episodes a "C", Ben Travers at IndieWire felt the series was "any movie or TV show where a criminal is enlisted by the authorities to help solve a difficult case" with little story progress made over the first two episodes, instead using "exhausting" explanations. He added, "Loki isn't really about Loki, so much as it's about introducing the TVA, the logistics of time travel, and how the MCU's Phase 4 timeline will end up with a Multiverse of Madness".

Holt's score for the series was also widely praised, with Jillian Unrau of GameRant stating Holt "has done an outstanding job in making the music complement the story, as well as be iconic on its own".

In her review for the final episode of the season, Caroline Siede at The A.V. Club felt the series had been "both unpredictable and weirdly straightforward; bold in its game-changing moves yet inconsequential in so many of its narrative choices". Giving the season an 8 out of 10, Simon Cardy of IGN said compared to the previous two Marvel Studios series which were "more introspective pieces", Loki took viewers "to new places to meet new people; not only making for an enjoyable watch in its own right, but also providing excitement through the promise of what's to come". Cardy praised Hiddleston's performance, noting playing the 2012 version of the character "makes for a more entertaining centerpiece", as well as praising Wilson and Di Martino for their roles and chemistry with Hiddleston, and highlighting Arkapaw's cinematography. In his review of the season, The Verge's Andrew Webster explained that Loki made him "forget about the rest of the Marvel Cinematic Universe" since it was "an excellent piece of science fiction" that was the most standalone entry of the MCU to date, believing it was a good entry point to the MCU since it is "the best of what the superhero genre has to offer without all of the homework". Webster also praised the cast who all looked like they were "having a lot of fun", mentioning that "Hiddleston adds a depth to Loki that we haven't seen yet ... and he has a magnetic chemistry with both Wilson and Di Martino".

=== Analysis ===
Ahead of the series' release, Sam Barsanti at The A.V. Club noted how the potential for various alternate versions of Loki to appear in the series and continue on in the MCU was "a smart way to maintain Loki's presence in the MCU without worrying about keeping Hiddleston under contract or having to continue explaining that this Loki—even though he's played by Hiddleston—is not the same Loki that got killed by Thanos", and would follow suit with WandaVision and The Falcon and the Winter Soldier both revealing new incarnations of existing heroes. Barsanti was excited by the prospect of potentially seeing Old Man Loki (rumored at the time to be played by Grant), the heroic Kid Loki (who could be another potential member of the Young Avengers team that Marvel Studios had been teasing) and in particular, Lady Loki (rumored as Di Martino's role). Since Lady Loki is "generally more of an unrepentant villain than other Lokis", it would be a way for Marvel Studios to update the Loki character and have them be a villain without "[negating] the growth that Hiddleston's Loki went through". Writing for The Verge, Chaim Gartenberg believed heading into the series that Loki felt like "a capital-S Spinoff" more so than WandaVision and The Falcon and the Winter Soldier, both of which served as lead ins to feature films. As such, being somewhat more disconnected could allow Marvel the opportunity to "make a more standalone series that can actually be a good TV show", believing like in the comics, standalone stories sometimes produce the better stories than "the 1,000-issue epics".

After the first episode, Richard Newby at The Hollywood Reporter believed the series was promising a "grand expansion" of MCU lore that would "supersede anything Marvel Studios has ever attempted with a single [MCU] entry" stating Loki felt "cosmically big, yet at the same time, [still] deeply personal". Particular lore items Newby was keen to keep an eye on were Nexus Points, that could have connections to WandaVision, and how those could lead to the creations of multiverses, and the multiversal war, which could be a reference to a future Secret Wars-type event that would "rewrite reality" and "make the quest for the Infinity Stones seem small in comparison".

Ben Child of The Guardian criticized Loki's return as part of a pattern of MCU characters making appearances after their onscreen deaths, citing characters' returns from the Blip, the return of Natasha Romanoff in the prequel Black Widow, and the appearance of versions of Vision in WandaVision, saying it "spoil[s] the gorgeous pathos of all those death scenes" and that "all bets are off with future resurrection methods".

Following "The Nexus Event", which saw the Time-Keepers revealed to be animatronics and Loki appear on a desolate world with other Loki variants after being pruned, Newby opined that the Beyonder and Battleworld could factor into the series. Adam B. Vary and Mónica Marie Zorrilla of Variety disagreed with Newby, pointing out that, with Marvel Studios' previous series, they did not weave "complicated, brand new characters as central figures" such as the Beyonder this late into a series. The pair did believe Kang the Conqueror could be a factor, since the character "[made] sense from the comics ... [and] for the MCU" as he had stronger ties to elements of Loki, such as a relationship with Ravonna in the comics, and would be appearing in Ant-Man and the Wasp: Quantumania portrayed by Majors. A variant of Kang appears in the final episode, He Who Remains, also portrayed by Majors. Newby noted how this time the fan theories panned out, but with "an unexpected twist". Knowing Majors would also be appearing as Kang, Newby was excited by Majors's "unique chance ... to play different versions of one character, each potentially more frightening than the last". David Opie of Digital Spy criticized the introduction of He Who Remains, saying it "came completely out of nowhere" for non-comics readers, despite conceding that the speculation surrounding the character's appearance was correct.

=== Accolades ===
Accolades received by Loki, season one
| Award | Date(s) of ceremony | Category | Recipient(s) | Result | Ref. |
|---|---|---|---|---|---|
| Dragon Awards | September 5, 2021 | Best Science Fiction or Fantasy TV Series | Loki | Nominated | |
| Harvey Awards | October 8, 2021 | Best Adaptation from Comic Book/Graphic Novel | Loki | Nominated | |
| World Soundtrack Awards | October 23, 2021 | TV Composer of the Year | Natalie Holt | Nominated | |
| Hollywood Music in Media Awards | November 17, 2021 | Score – TV Show/Limited Series | Natalie Holt | Nominated | |
| Hollywood Professional Association Awards | November 18, 2021 | Outstanding Visual Effects – Episodic (Under 13 Episodes) or Non-theatrical Feature | Dan DeLeeuw, David Seager, Alexandra Greene, George Kuruvilla, Dan Mayer (for "Journey into Mystery") | Nominated | |
| People's Choice Awards | December 7, 2021 | Show of 2021 | Loki | Won | |
| People's Choice Awards | December 7, 2021 | Male TV Star of 2021 | Tom Hiddleston | Won | |
| People's Choice Awards | December 7, 2021 | Bingeworthy Show of 2021 | Loki | Nominated | |
| People's Choice Awards | December 7, 2021 | Sci-Fi/Fantasy Show of 2021 | Loki | Nominated | |
| Screen Actors Guild Awards | February 27, 2022 | Outstanding Performance by a Stunt Ensemble in a Comedy or Drama Series | Loki | Nominated | |
| Black Reel TV Awards | February 28, 2022 | Outstanding Guest Actor, Drama Series | Jonathan Majors | Nominated | |
| Art Directors Guild Awards | March 5, 2022 | Excellence in Production Design for a One-Hour Period or Fantasy Single-Camera Series | Kasra Farahani (for "Glorious Purpose") | Won | |
| Visual Effects Society | March 8, 2022 | Outstanding Visual Effects in a Photoreal Episode | Dan DeLeeuw, Allison Paul, Sandra Balej, David Seager (for "Journey into Mystery") | Nominated | |
| Visual Effects Society | March 8, 2022 | Outstanding Virtual Cinematography in a CG Project | "Race to the Ark" – Jesse Lewis-Evans, Luke Avery, Autumn Durald Arkapaw, Scott Inkster (for "Lamentis") | Nominated | |
| Visual Effects Society | March 8, 2022 | Outstanding Effects Simulations in an Episode, Commercial, or Real-Time Project | "Alioth Cloud" – George Kuruvilla, Menno Dijkstra, Matthew Hanger, Jiyong Shin (for "Journey into Mystery") | Nominated | |
| Visual Effects Society | March 8, 2022 | Outstanding Compositing and Lighting in an Episode | "Shuroo City Destruction" – Paul Chapman, Tom Truscott, Biagio Figliuzzi, Attila Szalma (for "Lamentis") | Won | |
| Costume Designers Guild Awards | March 9, 2022 | Excellence in Sci-Fi/Fantasy Television | Christine Wada (for "Journey into Mystery") | Nominated | |
| MPSE Golden Reel Awards | March 13, 2022 | Outstanding Achievement in Sound Editing – Limited Series or Anthology | Various (Note: David Acord, Matthew Wood, Kirsten Mate, Adam Kopald, Steve Slanec, Brad Semenoff, David Farmer, Joel Raabe, Shelley Roden, John Roesch, Anele Onyekwere, Nashia Wachsman, Ed Hamilton) (for "Journey into Mystery") | Nominated | |
| Critics' Choice Super Awards | March 17, 2022 | Best Superhero Series | Loki | Nominated | |
| Critics' Choice Super Awards | March 17, 2022 | Best Actor in a Superhero Series | Tom Hiddleston | Won | |
| Critics' Choice Super Awards | March 17, 2022 | Best Actress in a Superhero Series | Sophia Di Martino | Nominated | |
| Critics' Choice Super Awards | March 17, 2022 | Best Actress in a Superhero Series | Gugu Mbatha-Raw | Nominated | |
| Critics' Choice Super Awards | March 17, 2022 | Best Villain in a Series | Jonathan Majors | Nominated | |
| Writers Guild of America Awards | March 20, 2022 | Drama Series | Bisha K. Ali, Elissa Karasik, Eric Martin, Michael Waldron | Nominated | |
| Writers Guild of America Awards | March 20, 2022 | New Series | Bisha K. Ali, Elissa Karasik, Eric Martin, Michael Waldron | Nominated | |
| Nickelodeon Kids' Choice Awards | April 9, 2022 | Favorite Family TV Show | Loki | Nominated | |
| Nickelodeon Kids' Choice Awards | April 9, 2022 | Favorite Male TV Star (Family) | Tom Hiddleston | Won | |
| British Academy Television Craft Awards | April 24, 2022 | Best Original Music | Natalie Holt | Nominated | |
| ASCAP Composers' Choice Awards | May 2, 2022 | Television Score of the Year | Natalie Holt | Nominated | |
| ASCAP Composers' Choice Awards | May 2, 2022 | Television Theme of the Year | Natalie Holt | Nominated | |
| MTV Movie & TV Awards | June 5, 2022 | Best Show | Loki | Nominated | |
| MTV Movie & TV Awards | June 5, 2022 | Breakthrough Performance | Sophia Di Martino | Won | |
| MTV Movie & TV Awards | June 5, 2022 | Best Team | Tom Hiddleston, Sophia Di Martino and Owen Wilson | Won | |
| Set Decorators Society of America Awards | August 2, 2022 | Best Achievement in Décor/Design of a One Hour Fantasy or Science Fiction Series | Claudia Bonfe and Kasra Farahani | Nominated | |
| Hollywood Critics Association TV Awards | August 14, 2022 | Best Streaming Series, Drama | Loki | Nominated | |
| Hollywood Critics Association TV Awards | August 14, 2022 | Best Actor in a Streaming Series, Drama | Tom Hiddleston | Nominated | |
| Hollywood Critics Association TV Awards | August 14, 2022 | Best Supporting Actress in a Streaming Series, Drama | Sophia Di Martino | Nominated | |
| Hollywood Critics Association TV Awards | August 14, 2022 | Best Supporting Actor in a Streaming Series, Drama | Owen Wilson | Nominated | |
| Hollywood Critics Association TV Awards | August 14, 2022 | Best Writing in a Streaming Series, Drama | Michael Waldron (for "Glorious Purpose") | Nominated | |
| Hollywood Critics Association TV Awards | August 14, 2022 | Best Directing in a Streaming Series, Drama | Kate Herron (for "Journey into Mystery") | Nominated | |
| Dorian Awards | August 17, 2022 | Most Visually Striking Show | Loki | Nominated | |
| Hugo Awards | September 4, 2022 | Best Dramatic Presentation, Short Form | Eric Martin, Kate Herron, Michael Waldron (for "The Nexus Event") | Nominated | |
| Primetime Creative Arts Emmy Awards | September 3–4, 2022 | Outstanding Production Design for a Narrative Contemporary Program (One Hour or More) | Kasra Farahani, Natasha Gerasimova, and Claudia Bonfe (for "Glorious Purpose") | Nominated | |
| Primetime Creative Arts Emmy Awards | September 3–4, 2022 | Outstanding Cinematography for a Single-Camera Series (One Hour) | Autumn Durald Arkapaw (for "Lamentis") | Nominated | |
| Primetime Creative Arts Emmy Awards | September 3–4, 2022 | Outstanding Fantasy/Sci-Fi Costumes | Christine Wada, Nora Pederson, Tamsin Costello, and Carol Beadle (for "Glorious Purpose") | Nominated | |
| Primetime Creative Arts Emmy Awards | September 3–4, 2022 | Outstanding Music Composition for a Series (Original Dramatic Score) | Natalie Holt (for "Glorious Purpose") | Nominated | |
| Primetime Creative Arts Emmy Awards | September 3–4, 2022 | Outstanding Original Main Title Theme Music | Natalie Holt | Nominated | |
| Primetime Creative Arts Emmy Awards | September 3–4, 2022 | Outstanding Sound Editing for a Comedy or Drama Series (One-Hour) | Various (Note: Matthew Wood, David Acord, Brad Semenoff, Steve Slanec, Kyrsten Mate, Adam Kopald, Joel Raabe, Anele Onyekwere, Ed Hamilton, Nashia Wachsman, Shelley Roden, and John Roesch) (for "Journey into Mystery") | Nominated | |
| Saturn Awards | October 25, 2022 | Best Fantasy Series (Streaming) | Loki | Won | |
| Saturn Awards | October 25, 2022 | Best Actor in a Streaming Series | Tom Hiddleston | Nominated | |
| Saturn Awards | October 25, 2022 | Best Guest Performance in a Streaming Series | Jonathan Majors | Nominated | |
| Saturn Awards | February 4, 2024 | Best Television Home Media Release | Loki (Season 1) – 4K Steelbook | Nominated | |

By April 2022, Marvel Studios and Disney had decided to submit Loki in the various drama series categories for the Primetime Emmy Awards, rather than in the limited series categories. Disney had previously planned to submit the series in the limited series categories along with Hawkeye and Moon Knight. Clayton Davis at Variety noted that the reveal of a second season in the post-credits scene of the season one finale and the Academy of Television Arts & Sciences rules for entering a series in the limited series categories left the studios with "no other choice" than to submit in the drama or comedy categories, choosing the drama ones, which Davis felt was "the smarter choice".

== Documentary special ==
In February 2021, the documentary series Marvel Studios: Assembled was announced. The special on this series, Assembled: The Making of Loki, goes behind the scenes of the making of the season, featuring Waldron, Herron, Hiddleston, Mbatha-Raw, Mosaku, Wilson, Di Martino, Oparei, Grant, and Majors. The special was released on Disney+ on July 21, 2021, and was included as part of the season's home media release on September 26, 2023.
