= Journey into Mystery (Loki) =

- Loki episode
- Promotional poster
- Episode no.: Season 1 Episode 5
- Directed by: Kate Herron
- Written by: Tom Kauffman
- Cinematography by: Autumn Durald Arkapaw
- Editing by: Calum Ross
- Original release date: July 7, 2021
- Running time: 49 minutes

Cast
- Neil Ellice as Hunter D-90

Episode chronology
← Previous "The Nexus Event"	Next → "For All Time. Always."
- Loki season 1

"Journey into Mystery" is the fifth episode of the first season of the American television series Loki, based on Marvel Comics featuring the character Loki. It follows alternate versions of the character who are sent to the end of time by the mysterious Time Variance Authority (TVA) and must work together to survive. The episode is set in the Marvel Cinematic Universe (MCU), sharing continuity with the films of the franchise. It was written by Tom Kauffman and directed by Kate Herron.

Tom Hiddleston reprises his role as Loki from the film series, with other versions of the character including Sophia Di Martino as a female variant named Sylvie, Jack Veal as a young version called Kid Loki, DeObia Oparei as a version known as Boastful Loki, and Richard E. Grant as an older version called Classic Loki. Gugu Mbatha-Raw, Wunmi Mosaku, Tara Strong, and Owen Wilson also star in the episode. Herron joined the series in August 2019. Filming took place at Pinewood Atlanta Studios, with location filming in the Atlanta metropolitan area.

"Journey into Mystery" was released on Disney+ on July 7, 2021. The episode was positively received by critics, with praise towards Grant's performance, the pacing, and the setup for the season finale.

== Plot ==
Time Variance Authority (TVA) Judge Ravonna Renslayer tells Sylvie that she does not know who created the TVA and that Loki was teleported to the Void, a dimension at the end of Time where everything the TVA prunes is dumped into and from which nothing has returned. They also deduce that the TVA's creator is hiding in the timeline beyond the Void, where they cannot be detected. TVA mascot Miss Minutes and Renslayer stall for time until TVA Minutemen arrive. Facing capture, Sylvie prunes herself. After interrogating an imprisoned Hunter B-15, Renslayer instructs Miss Minutes to help her find the TVA's creator.

Meanwhile, Loki learns from four time variants of himself – Alligator Loki, Boastful Loki, Classic Loki, and Kid Loki – that Alioth, a massive cloud-like creature, hunts and kills all life in the Void. Upon arriving, Sylvie briefly enchants Alioth before receiving help from former TVA member Mobius M. Mobius in escaping the creature.

Intending to rule, Boastful Loki betrays the other Lokis for a second Loki group led by President Loki. However, the Lokis betray each other, sparking a fight. Classic Loki helps Alligator Loki, Kid Loki, and Loki escape and eventually find Sylvie and Mobius. Using a TemPad Sylvie stole from Renslayer, Mobius chooses to return to the TVA and reveal the truth about the organization to its employees. He asks the Loki variants to come with him, but they stay behind.

After the variants escape, Loki attempts to distract Alioth so Sylvie can enchant it, but both fail until Classic Loki returns and creates a life-sized illusion of Asgard to distract Alioth, saving Sylvie and sacrificing himself in the process. Working together, Sylvie and Loki enchant Alioth, revealing a citadel beyond the Void, which they walk towards.

== Production ==
=== Development ===
By September 2018, Marvel Studios was developing a limited series starring Tom Hiddleston's Loki from the Marvel Cinematic Universe (MCU) films. Loki was confirmed to be in development by Disney CEO Bob Iger in November. Kate Herron was hired to direct the series in August 2019. Herron and head writer Michael Waldron executive produce alongside Hiddleston and Marvel Studios' Kevin Feige, Louis D'Esposito, Victoria Alonso, and Stephen Broussard. The fifth episode, titled "Journey into Mystery", was written by Tom Kauffman. The title shares its name with the comic book series in which Thor and Loki were introduced.

=== Writing ===
"Journey into Mystery" expands upon the additional Loki variants–Classic Loki, Boastful Loki, Kid Loki, and Alligator Loki–first introduced in the previous episode's mid-credits scene. Hiddleston called it "completely surreal and an absolute delight" to explore other versions of the characters with different actors and felt when all of them were together, it was "some sort of surrealist party" with Hiddleston's Loki initially being the most unlike the character than the others. An early draft of the episode would have revealed a Loki Variance Authority existed in the Void, with all of the Lokis sent there a part of it. Ahead of the series' premiere, Feige had mentioned one of the benefits of exploring the multiverse and "playing with time" was being able to see other versions of characters, particularly of Loki.

Classic Loki's backstory was conceived after Waldron pondered the "what if" question of what would have happened if Loki had survived his death in Avengers: Infinity War (2018). Calling the backstory a "thought experiment", Waldron added it was "just so sad" and a "tragic thing" when Classic Loki realizes he is meant to be alone. Richard E. Grant's experience quarantining to join the production was "the key to plugging into who classic old Loki was" and allowed Grant to "zone in" for the character's speech explaining his backstory. Alligator Loki, an original variant created for the series, stemmed from Waldron's initial pitch meeting with Broussard and co-executive producer Kevin Wright, with the reasoning for his including being that he was green; this is also a point of discussion that the Lokis have in the episode, trying to determine if Alligator Loki is actually a Loki. Waldron explained that the possibility of an alligator variant is "so stupid, but it also makes total sense... It's just the sort of irreverent thing that, in this show, we play straight and make the audience take it seriously." A version of the script saw all of the Loki variants arrive to take on Alioth because they did not want the series' Loki to "outshine them" since they are all "narcissists", resulting in their heroic attempt to talk with Alioth ending in disaster.

The episode features many Easter eggs in the Void from the comics, such as Thanos' helicopter, Throg, Qeng Tower, a tower associated with Kang the Conqueror, and the Living Tribunal's head, as well as from the MCU, such as Yellowjacket's helmet, Mjolnir, a Helicarrier, and the Dark Aster. Real-world Easter eggs include the USS Eldridge, Polybius, and the Ecto Cooler.

=== Design ===
President Loki's costume was inspired by the comic miniseries Vote Loki, while Classic Loki's costume drew inspiration from the character's 1960s comic design by Jack Kirby. Grant had hoped the costume would have been more muscular, which would have likened itself even more to Kirby's design. The Void featured large heads and peacock-like creatures that Farahani created to help "infuse The Void with surrealism". Initially, production designer Kasra Farahani had envisioned a "more Salvador Dalí-esque, Dada-esque version" of the Void before settling on an "English moors" styling. Approximately seven sets were constructed of various parts of the Void. Kid Loki's lair was a 360-degree set that had "a lot of topographical changes". Farahani said, "We imagined it as a fractured bowling alley with a slide element to it. All the lines there are visually drawing your eye to the throne which we imagined was an old Santa throne from a mall, pulled from a deleted reality."

=== Casting ===
The episode stars Tom Hiddleston as Loki and President Loki, Sophia Di Martino as Sylvie, Gugu Mbatha-Raw as Ravonna Renslayer, Wunmi Mosaku as Hunter B-15, Jack Veal as Kid Loki, DeObia Oparei as Boastful Loki, Tara Strong as the voice of Miss Minutes, Richard E. Grant as Classic Loki, and Owen Wilson as Mobius M. Mobius. Additionally, Neil Ellice appears as Hunter D-90. Chris Hemsworth makes an uncredited voice cameo as Throg. Additional Loki variants that appear as part of President Loki's gang include Glamshades Loki, Poky Loki, In Prison Loki, and Bicycle Loki; these were named by costume designer Christine Wada.

=== Filming and visual effects ===
Filming took place at Pinewood Atlanta Studios in Atlanta, Georgia, with Herron directing, and Autumn Durald Arkapaw serving as cinematographer. Location filming took place in the Atlanta metropolitan area. Filming material in the Void lasted seven days.

Alligator Loki was created through CGI, with a stuffed stand-in used during filming, which Herron felt was useful for the actors to interact with. The design of Alligator Loki also shifted several times, after an early version was more of a cartoon style that was "a bit too cute". Herron felt it became "funnier and funnier" as the design became more life-like, hitting the "sweet spot" when it "felt like a real alligator, but with a kind of slightly jaunty horns on". Industrial Light & Magic (ILM), who worked on Alligator Loki, referenced a real-life emotional support alligator named Wally to determine his movements, with Additional VFX Supervisor Luke McDonald noting real-life physics were not taken into consideration at times. Herron was inspired by the teasing of the shark in Jaws (1975) for Alioth, with McDonald referencing volcanic eruptions and pyroclastic flows that feature thermal lightning for its design. In addition to ILM, visual effects for the episode were created by Rise FX, Luma Pictures, Crafty Apes, Cantina Creative, Trixter, and Method Studios.

=== Music ===
Beginning with this episode, composer Natalie Holt incorporated a 32-person choir into her score, in addition to the other elements. An arrangement of the song "Ride of the Valkyries" by Richard Wagner appears in the episode when Classic Loki is creating his Asgard illusion.

== Marketing ==
After the episode's release, Marvel announced merchandise inspired by the episode as part of its weekly "Marvel Must Haves" promotion for each episode of the series, including Funko Pops for the Loki variants, a President Loki Hot Toys Cosbaby figure, apparel, accessories, and jewelry. Marvel also released a promotional poster for "Journey into Mystery", which featured a quote from the episode.

== Release ==
"Journey into Mystery" was released on Disney+ on July 7, 2021. The Simpsons short film The Good, the Bart, and the Loki was released alongside the episode on Disney+, which sees Loki teaming up with Bart Simpson in a crossover that pays homage to the heroes and villains of the MCU. Hiddleston reprised his role as Loki in the short. The episode, along with the rest of Loki's first season, was released on Ultra HD Blu-ray and Blu-ray on September 26, 2023.

== Reception ==
=== Critical response ===
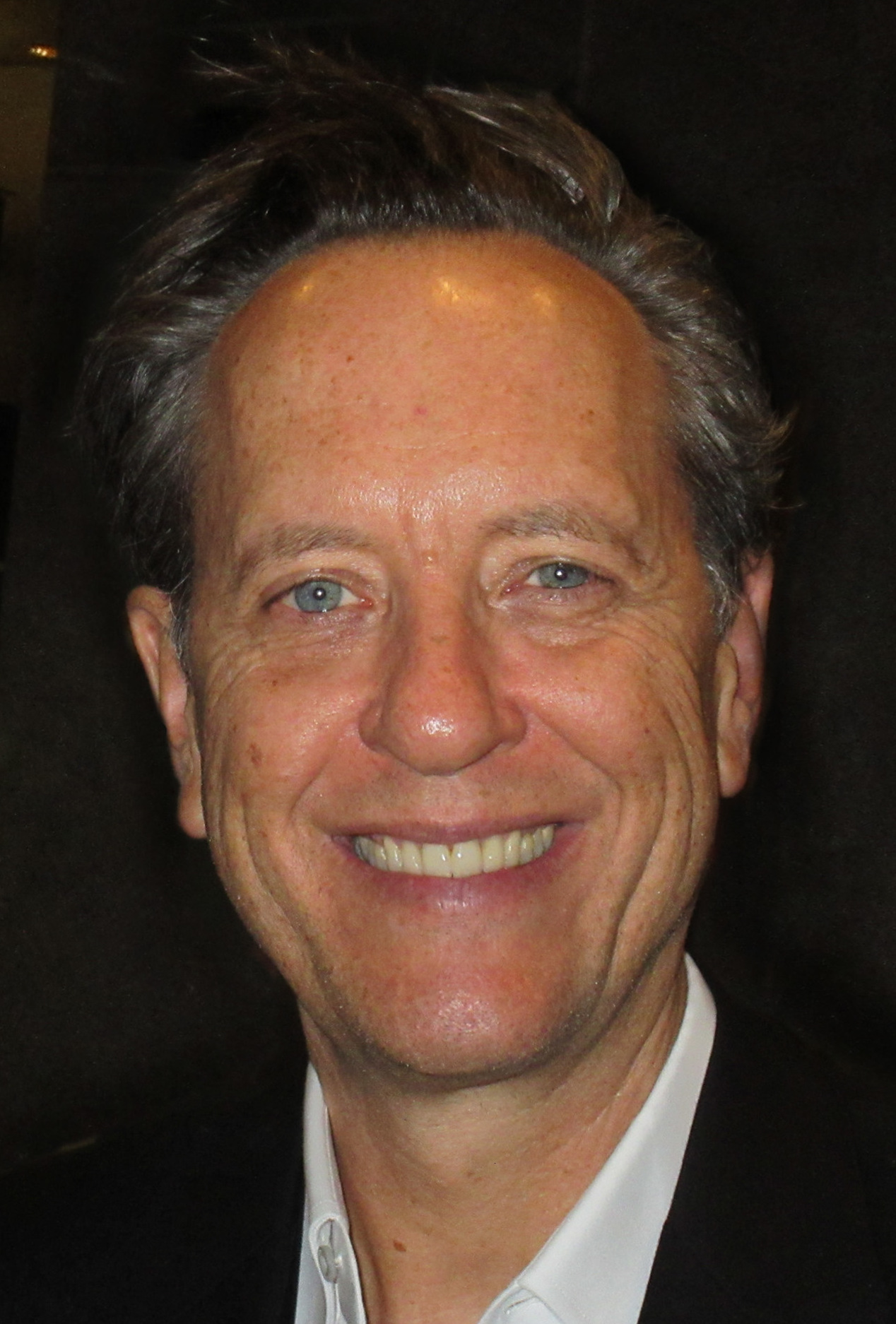
Richard E. Grant's performance as Classic Loki in the episode was widely praised

The review aggregator website Rotten Tomatoes reported an 89% approval rating, with an average score of 7.7 out of 10, based on 28 reviews. The site's critical consensus reads: "An epic penultimate joyride, "Journey into Mystery" pushes the pedal to the floor and lets a gaggle of Lokis do their thing – especially a scene-stealing Richard E. Grant in fine Asgardian form."

Alan Sepinwall of Rolling Stone said in the comic series Journey into Mystery "anything was possible... which makes it an apt moniker for an absolutely wonderful episode of Loki where the same holds true". He stated the episode was reminiscent of the series Lost, and believed what made "Journey into Mystery" special was "the way that it explores the untapped potential of Loki himself, in his many, many variations". Other highlights were the hug between Loki and Mobius and the expanding of the relationship and connection between Loki and Sylvie. Sepinwall concluded his review by hoping for a strong final episode, something he noted had not been the case with WandaVision and The Falcon and the Winter Soldier, though Loki "feels different so far" and "everything up to this point deserves" a good ending. Giving "Journey into Mystery" an 8 out of 10, IGN's Simon Cardy wrote the episode did "a great job of keeping up the pace set by last week's final revelations. It displays impressive scale, ranging from stunning apocalyptic threats to tender character moments for both new and returning cast members. And while it may not move the overarching plot along to the same extent as Episode 4, it's an enjoyable ride and one of Loki's strongest episodes yet". He noted while all the Loki variants featured had their moments, Grant's Classic Loki and "the absurdity of Alligator Loki" made a "particularly strong impression", and the "standout scene" was Loki and Sylvie expanding their feelings for one another; Cardy felt Hiddleston and Di Martino "play the moment out beautifully, bringing a touching sense of humanity". Cardy did, however, call it "a shame" that Renslayer was still an underdeveloped character, given the audience still did not know much about her. Concluding his review, Cardy pointed out there was "a lot left to do" in the final episode, and hoped the series "manages to end on a stronger note [than WandaVision] and deliver an ending as thrilling as the mystery weaved throughout deserves".

Writing for The A.V. Club, Caroline Siede stated, "Journey into Mystery" "is a blast to watch. It delivers a darkly madcap sense of fun worthy of its mischievous protagonist. And it ends with an appreciably big-scale action sequence and a compelling cliffhanger to take us into next week's finale." She felt the various Loki variants brought "a welcome spark" to the series, expanding up on the question of what makes a Loki a Loki, and welcomed the return of the question of free will, which had been "the most compelling thematic thread of the season". Siede did feel the episode "tries to do too much", saying: "While the episode's madcap energy keeps things moving along nicely, some of the emotional beats feel rather rushed"; she would have preferred it if the show had spent more time in the Void and less on Lamentis-1 (in the third episode). She concluded, saying "this episode is fun, stylish, irreverent, and character-centric in a way that serves the series well", giving the episode an "A−".

=== Accolades ===
Grant was named TVLine's "Performer of the Week" for the week of July 5, 2021, for his performance in this episode. The site stated, "It speaks to the quality of Grant's work in Loki's fifth episode that, having only known Classic Loki for about 40 minutes, we nonetheless became deeply emotionally invested in his survival," adding Grant "gave a performance as glorious as any Loki could hope to be". Dan DeLeeuw, David Seager, Alexandra Greene, George Kuruvilla, and Dan Mayer were nominated for Outstanding Visual Effects – Episodic (Under 13 Episodes) or Non-theatrical Feature for the episode at the 2021 Hollywood Professional Association Awards. At the 2022 Visual Effects Society Awards, Dan DeLeeuw, Allison Paul, Sandra Balej, and David Seager were nominated for Outstanding Visual Effects in a Photoreal Episode, while George Kuruvilla, Menno Dijkstra, Matthew Hanger, and Jiyong Shin were nominated for Outstanding Effects Simulations in an Episode, Commercial, or Real-Time Project for the "Alioth Cloud". Christine Wada was nominated for Excellence in Sci-Fi/Fantasy Television at the 24th Costume Designers Guild Awards, while David Acord, Matthew Wood, Kirsten Mate, Adam Kopald, Steve Slanec, Brad Semenoff, David Farmer, Joel Raabe, Shelley Roden, John Roesch, Anele Onyekwere, Nashia Wachsman, Ed Hamilton were nominated for Outstanding Achievement in Sound Editing - Limited Series or Anthology at the 2022 MPSE Golden Reel Awards. Herron was nominated for Best Directing in a Streaming Series, Drama at the 2nd Hollywood Critics Association TV Awards for her work on the episode. Matthew Wood, David Acord, Brad Semenoff, Steve Slanec, Kyrsten Mate, Adam Kopald, Joel Raabe, Anele Onyekwere, Ed Hamilton, Nashia Wachsman, Shelley Roden, and John Roesch were nominated for Outstanding Sound Editing for a Comedy or Drama Series (One-Hour) at the 74th Primetime Creative Arts Emmy Awards.
