= For All Time. Always. =

- Loki episode
- Promotional poster
- Episode no.: Season 1 Episode 6
- Directed by: Kate Herron
- Written by: Michael Waldron; Eric Martin
- Cinematography by: Autumn Durald Arkapaw
- Editing by: Emma McCleave
- Original release date: July 14, 2021
- Running time: 46 minutes

Cast
- Neil Ellice as Hunter D-90

Episode chronology
| ← Previous "Journey into Mystery" | Next → "Ouroboros" |
- Loki season 1

"For All Time. Always." is the sixth episode and season finale of the first season of the American television series Loki, based on Marvel Comics featuring the character Loki. It follows alternate versions of the character as they attempt to discover who created the mysterious Time Variance Authority (TVA). The episode is set in the Marvel Cinematic Universe (MCU), sharing continuity with the films of the franchise. It was written by head writer Michael Waldron and Eric Martin, and directed by Kate Herron.

Tom Hiddleston reprises his role as Loki from the film series, while Sophia Di Martino stars as a female version of the character named Sylvie. Gugu Mbatha-Raw, Wunmi Mosaku, Eugene Cordero, Tara Strong, Jonathan Majors, and Owen Wilson also star in the episode. Waldron was hired in February 2019 to serve as head writer of the series, with Herron joining in August. Filming took place at Pinewood Atlanta Studios, with location filming in the Atlanta metropolitan area.

"For All Time. Always." was released on Disney+ on July 14, 2021. The episode was praised for its introduction of He Who Remains, an alternate version of Kang the Conqueror, as well as Jonathan Majors' performance as the character.

== Plot ==
Loki and Sylvie enter the Citadel at the End of Time where they are greeted by Miss Minutes. She relays an offer from her master, "He Who Remains", to return them to the Sacred Timeline while offering him sovereignty and her happiness. However, the duo rejects the offer. At the Time Variance Authority (TVA) headquarters, Judge Ravonna Renslayer receives information sent by He Who Remains via Miss Minutes. Mobius M. Mobius confronts Renslayer and both accuse each other of betrayal. Renslayer leaves to search for "free will" after overcoming Mobius' attempt at pruning her. In 2018 Fremont, Ohio, Hunter B-15 is pursued by other TVA Minutemen until she reveals a variant of Renslayer, a school vice-principal, to prove that the TVA employees are variants.

Meanwhile, He Who Remains greets Loki and Sylvie, who are both surprised that he is "just a man". Using a TemPad to avoid Sylvie's attacks, He Who Remains reveals he can anticipate their actions because he has foreseen the past, present, and future and that he guided them to him. He also reveals that he created the TVA after several variants of himself discovered alternative universes and contacted each other in the 31st century. Several of them tried to conquer other universes, leading to a multiversal war. He Who Remains harnessed the creature Alioth to end it, isolate his timeline, and create the TVA to prevent further branches. As he has grown weary, he offers Loki and Sylvie a choice—kill him, end the singular timeline, and risk another multiversal war sparked by his variants, or succeed him in leading the TVA and managing the timeline.

As the timeline begins to diverge, He Who Remains finds he can no longer anticipate the future and Sylvie tries to kill him. Loki fights her, fearing He Who Remains might be right and pleading that he wants to keep her safe. They kiss, but Sylvie uses the TemPad to send Loki back to the TVA headquarters and kills a surrendering He Who Remains, unleashing a multiverse with timelines that cannot be pruned. Loki tries to warn B-15 and Mobius about He Who Remains' variants, but they do not recognize him. Loki then discovers that a statue of one of the variants (Note: Following the episode's release, it was revealed by production designer Kasra Farahani that the statue seen was of Kang the Conqueror, which was meant to indicate Loki was "in a different place... [and] timeline". The second season premiere "Ouroboros" (2023), however, revealed that Loki was in the same TVA's past, with the statue of He Who Remains.) has replaced those of the Time-Keepers.

== Production ==
=== Development ===
By September 2018, Marvel Studios was developing a limited series starring Tom Hiddleston's Loki from the Marvel Cinematic Universe (MCU) films. Loki was confirmed to be in development by Disney CEO Bob Iger in November. Kate Herron was hired to direct the series in August 2019. Herron and head writer Michael Waldron executive produce alongside Hiddleston and Marvel Studios' Kevin Feige, Louis D'Esposito, Victoria Alonso, and Stephen Broussard. The sixth episode, titled "For All Time. Always.", was written by Waldron and Eric Martin. The episode's mid-credits scene confirmed the series' renewal for a second season.

=== Writing ===
Waldron called Miss Minutes "really scary" when she becomes evil in the episode, despite her previous "sing-songy and sort of non-threatening" way of talking. Herron described her as a "devil on the shoulder" for Loki and Sylvie, and originally had planned for Miss Minutes to fight the pair in the Citadel at the End of Time. The production break allowed the creatives to reexamine Miss Minutes' role in the episode, resulting in creating a deeper, "protective" relationship between her and He Who Remains than was initially conceived. Tara Strong wanted "to play her angry after starting at this place of very cute and cautious of how much you know about her, to finally let her emotions really come out", and enjoyed "play[ing] her to this next level in this maximum capacity".

He Who Remains is revealed to be the "man behind the curtain" of the Time Variance Authority (TVA), played by Jonathan Majors, who appears in the film Ant-Man and the Wasp: Quantumania (2023) as Kang the Conqueror, a variant of He Who Remains. He Who Remains, who is a separate character in the comics, was altered for the MCU to be a variant of Kang, and was also partially inspired by Immortus. Kang was always intended to be a part of the series, since Waldron believed the character fit in a story that involved time travel and the multiverse. Despite this, the writers considered using a Loki variant in that role instead. Those conversations did not go far enough for Hiddleston to be informed because it was decided that this would make the universe "feel small". Waldron felt it made "so much sense" to introduce Majors in the series, since Kang is "a time-traveling, multiversal adversary" and thought to be "the next big cross-movie villain". In writing the character, Waldron hoped to "really hint at that terrifying evil within", while still portraying his other variants as more evil than he is. Herron called He Who Remains "the one that brings" the series together since he was "the theme of our show", demonstrating that "no one is completely good or completely bad, and people do fall into that gray area". He Who Remains' solitude also resonated with Herron's experience during the COVID-19 lockdown. When Ravonna Renslayer learns that the TVA is a lie and its agents are variants, she decides that she wants to stay in power and "reacts more in anger", instead of questioning her life's purpose as Mobius M. Mobius had done. Gugu Mbatha-Raw said that Renslayer "wants revenge with whoever put this whole facade together", with Waldron adding she wants to find "who pulled the wool over her eyes".

Loki's speech during his and Sylvie's meeting with He Who Remains was worked on and revised by Herron, Martin, Hiddleston, and Di Martino until filming, as Herron had wanted to "get it right". Herron felt the line "I just want you to be okay" was "so key" to his speech, because it had "pain" in it and showed that he had "evolved... [and] moved beyond his pain and anger, and he doesn't want that for her". Sophia Di Martino believed having Sylvie hear from Loki that he wants her to be okay was "such a nice thing" considering how damaged she is, adding, "It sort of breaks her heart a little bit because she just wants herself to be OK as well. For someone else to acknowledge that, and to see her in that way and to just see her, is so powerful." Discussing Sylvie's decision to kill He Who Remains and betray Loki, Di Martino noted that in that moment Sylvie believes killing him "is going to make her feel better", and that feeling, which is fueled by anger built up since her childhood, "is stronger than any feelings she has for Loki". Herron compared Sylvie's situation in the scene to Loki's characterization in Thor (2011), with Sylvie being "driven by revenge, pain, and anger", and with Loki understanding her feelings due to his own experience. Herron felt that although Sylvie's betrayal was "a horrible goodbye, [...] the feelings were real" in their final confrontation. Di Martino added that, despite going through with killing He Who Remains, Sylvie remains unfulfilled without getting "the relief that she's been waiting for her whole life".

The ending of the episode, which sees the Sacred Timeline broken, Loki at a TVA in a different timeline, and a statue of Kang replacing those of the Time Keepers, had different variations, with this one chosen while the production was on its COVID-19 hiatus. Waldron believed that the ending they settled on felt "right" and was able to close "one chapter of the story" while providing "thrilling propulsive energy into whatever happens next". He originally had another ending planned, and felt it was possible a version of that original ending could one day be seen in the MCU. The series' "Art of" book provided some clues to the original ending, which would have seen Loki going "off on to some of his own adventures in a different realm". Once it was known that a second season would happen, elements were added to the ending to make it a cliffhanger. Herron added that it was always known that the season would end with the rebirth of the multiverse. She also felt it was important to show that Loki "still has a fight in his heart" in the scenes in the Time Theater after Sylvie sends him away, even though he has reached his lowest point. Hiddleston added that Loki's confusion in that moment, processing Sylvie's betrayal after he "made a brave choice", was "unprecedented and it shatters him internally". The final line of the episode from Mobius, "Who are you?", mimics the first line from the first episode and was "the question of the whole first season".

Herron added that a mid-credits scene for the episode was never considered as the creatives "always just were thinking just of the story and where we knew we wanted it to end", although the announcement of a second season was included mid-credits as "a fun nod to something that Marvel does so well".

=== Casting ===
The episode stars Tom Hiddleston as Loki, Sophia Di Martino as Sylvie, Gugu Mbatha-Raw as Ravonna Renslayer, Wunmi Mosaku as Hunter B-15, Eugene Cordero as Hunter K-5E, Tara Strong as the voice of Miss Minutes, Jonathan Majors as He Who Remains, and Owen Wilson as Mobius M. Mobius. Also appearing is Neil Ellice as Hunter D-90. Waldron was glad Majors' appearance in the episode did not leak ahead of time, noting many viewers suspected a version of Kang could appear in a post-credits scene, but would likely not have been a large part of the episode as Majors was.

=== Design ===
You have this grand fantasy space of a black asteroid inside of a nebula, and then you have Gothic Revival architecture and multicultural horology.

— Production designer Kasra Farahani describing the varying design elements of the Citadel at the End of Time

Production designer Kasra Farahani took inspiration from the comics for the Citadel at the End of Time, having the Citadel be carved in situ from the asteroid, similar to Petra in Jordan, with it made from "this black stone with gold vein embellishments"; the gold was meant to represent "an unknowable kind of technology" since scientific discoveries have shown that asteroids can contain "unfathomable cache of precious metals and rare elements". Inside, the Citadel is mostly abandoned, except for He Who Remains' office, as a way to reflect "this sad, lonely figure rattling around a big empty space" who has decided to inhabit only his office. Leading to his office, Farahani constructed 13-foot-tall sculptures, sentinels of time that each hold half of an hourglass, followed by "an elaborate timekeeping apparatus where the room itself serves as the clock"; these touches were meant to slowly reveal who was in the Citadel without explicitly stating it to the audience. He Who Remains' office was a challenge for Farahani and his team to add light sources in the room since it was supposed to have been formed in situ, ultimately suggesting a nebula outside the window to provide an outside light, along with the glow of the fireplace. The architecture of the Citadel was inspired by Hearst Castle, with Farahani believing He Who Remains had built it, pulling from "assorted grand architectural styles" to create it. Herron compared Farahani's design to a "Sunset Boulevard kind of dusty, dilapidated space".

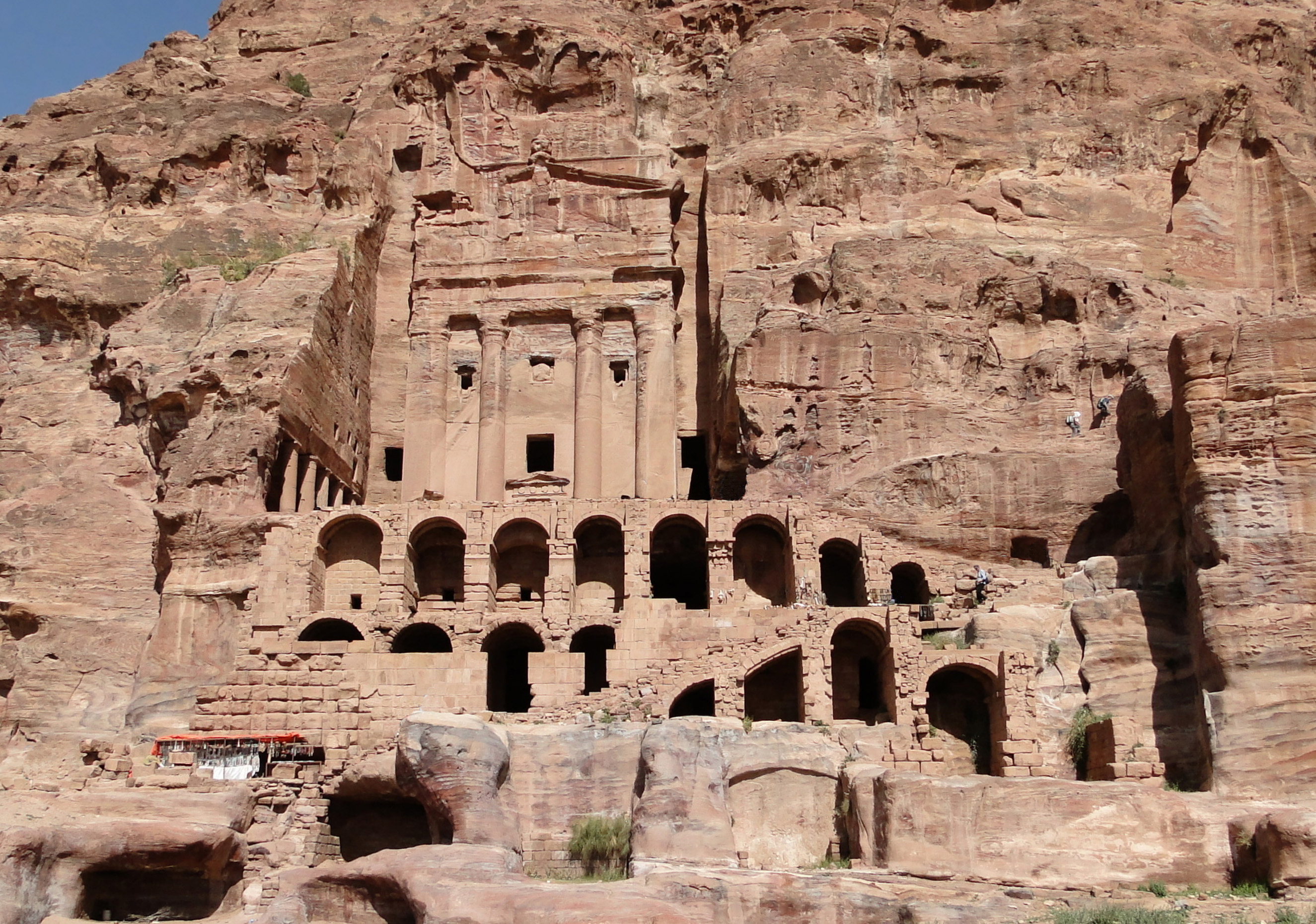
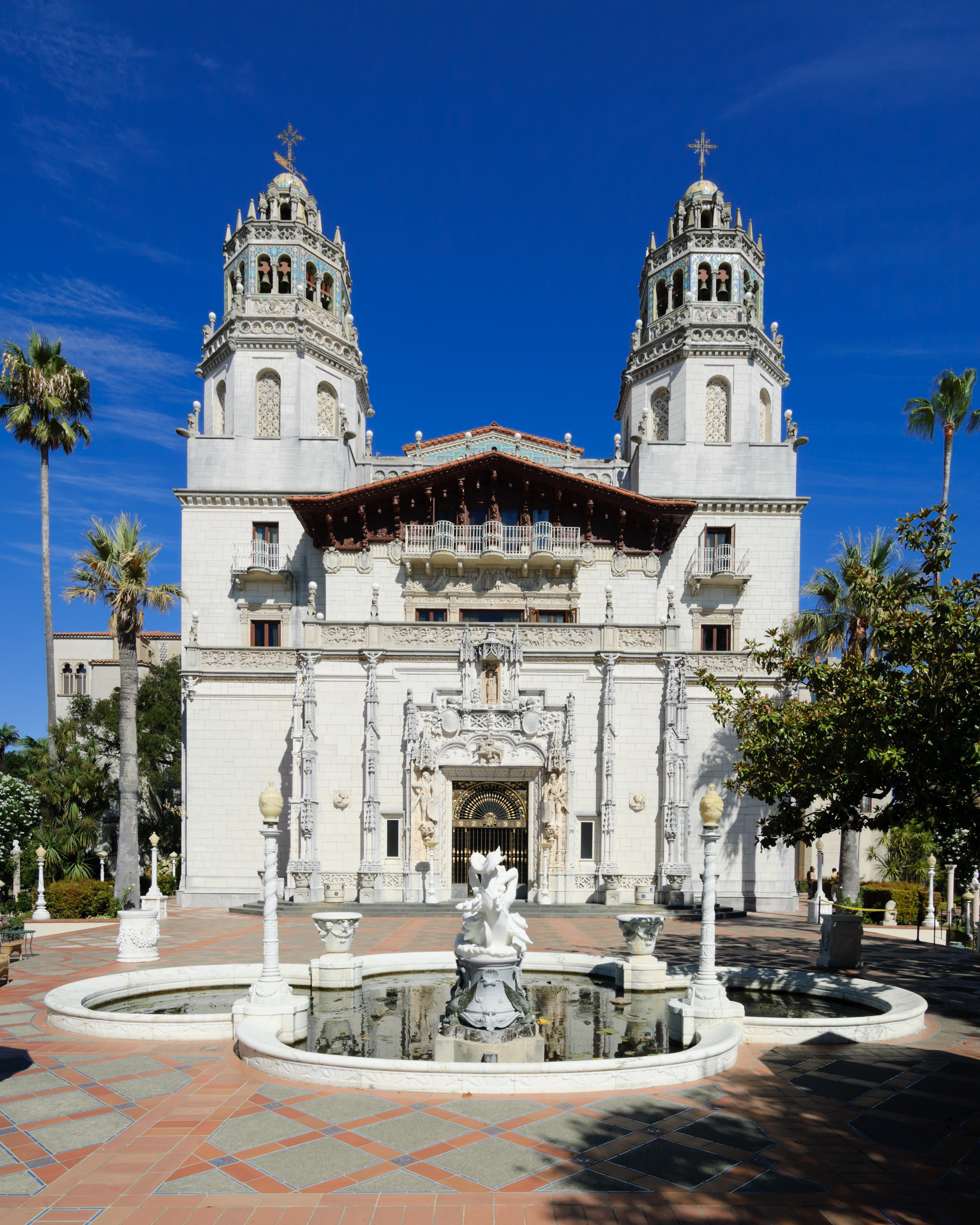
Petra (L) and Hearst Castle (R) both influenced the Citadel's design

Herron felt the Citadel set helped Majors' performance of presenting He Who Remains as "the extrovert, but also the introvert of someone that would be living by themselves and only talking to a cartoon clock". He Who Remains' costume was constructed from elements throughout time, such as a Victorian era cape, shoes from Genghis Khan, and Mongolian pants, with a chest piece meant to evoke Immortus. Herron likened his costume to pajamas, given their "comfy" nature. For the TVA shown at the ending, Farahani made sure it looked the same as the one featured in all the previous episodes, to help "delay the audience and Loki's understanding that they were in a different place". This TVA also has a statue of Kang the Conqueror in place of the three Time Keepers, with Farahani working with the visual development team to create the character's look and design.

=== Filming and visual effects ===
Filming took place at Pinewood Atlanta Studios in Atlanta, Georgia, with Herron directing, and Autumn Durald Arkapaw serving as cinematographer. Location filming took place in the Atlanta metropolitan area, including at the Atlanta Marriott Marquis, which was used for the Time Variance Authority's (TVA) headquarters. Loki's scenes in the Time Theater after Sylvie sends him away were the first to be shot when production resumed from their hiatus, with Hiddleston believing these scenes were an "intense" place to restart. Majors filmed his part during the final week of shooting for the series, coordinating with his commitments for the film The Harder They Fall (2021), which was filming in New Mexico. Majors felt it was difficult to prepare for Loki while being the lead actor of The Harder They Fall. To help Majors, Herron had line readings between him, Hiddleston, and Di Martino over Zoom. Herron also allowed Majors to improvise elements of his performance, such as certain lines or movements.

Di Martino felt Sylvie's fight with Loki was "far more emotive" than their fight earlier in the season, believing it felt like a "breakup scene", saying, "It was the fight that you have when you are leaving someone. And it's so painful because you care about this person, but you just can't be with them for whatever reason." The end of the episode with Loki realizing he is in a different TVA was a reference to the ending of Planet of the Apes (1968).

The episode opens with a sequence that features various archival audio from past MCU projects, including audio of Sam Wilson, Hope van Dyne, T'Challa, Scott Lang, Natasha Romanoff, Peter Quill, Thor, Steve Rogers, Hank Pym, Carol Danvers, Loki, Korg, Classic Loki, Vision, and Sylvie, as well as audio of Alan Watts, Neil Armstrong, Greta Thunberg, Malala Yousafzai, Nelson Mandela, Ellen Johnson Sirleaf, and Maya Angelou; this was an homage to the film Contact (1997). Two black holes featured in the sequence were also inspired by Contact. Herron called the sequence "ever evolving" and initially had suggested "sounds of the Earth" be used at the end of the sequence when the visual is entering the timeline along with "a few quotes from time". This version was shown to Feige and the other Marvel Studios executives, who enjoyed the ending with the sounds, with Feige noting that the studio had never included MCU voices in their opening before. This led to Herron and her sound team finding the quotes for the opening, matched to when their character appears, with the sounds expanding to the whole sequence as a way to "hand off to the previous phase" and be "a summary of the chaos of the universe that He Who Remains is surrounded by". Herron also worked with the Disney Diversity Team to select the real-world voices. The episode's editor, Emma McCleave, and her assistant, Sara Bennett, also played a crucial role in the opening's creation. The timeline, originally presented as a straight line in the series, is revealed to be circular at the end of the sequence, a revelation that Herron compared to the Earth now being considered to be spherical rather than flat, since "the TVA's knowledge of the timeline has always been [as] a straight line".

Visual effects for the episode were created by Trixter, Luma Pictures, Cantina Creative, Crafty Apes, Method Studios, Lola Visual Effects, and FuseFX. The episode, and season, was completed on June 20, 2021.

=== Music ===
The opening sequence features "It's Been a Long, Long Time" by Harry James, previously heard in Captain America: The Winter Soldier (2014) and Avengers: Endgame (2019), and the Bollywood song "Swag Saha Nahi Jaye" from Happy Phirr Bhag Jayegi (2018), sung by Sohail Sen and Neha Bhasin. Composer Natalie Holt's score references Mark Mothersbaugh's "Twilight of the Gods" from Thor: Ragnarok (2017).

== Marketing ==
After the episode's release, Marvel announced merchandise inspired by the episode as part of its weekly "Marvel Must Haves" promotion for each episode of the series, including jewelry, apparel, wall decals, and accessories. Marvel also released a promotional poster for "For All Time. Always.", which featured a quote from the episode.

== Release ==
"For All Time. Always." was released on Disney+ on July 14, 2021. The episode, along with the rest of Loki's first season, was released on Ultra HD Blu-ray and Blu-ray on September 26, 2023.

== Reception ==
=== Audience viewership ===
According to Samba TV, the episode was viewed in 1.9 million U.S. households from July 14–18, surpassing the finales for WandaVision (1.4 million) and The Falcon and the Winter Soldier (1.7 million). Over its first five days of release, it also had viewership highs in the United Kingdom (300,000 households), Germany (96,000), and Australia (12,000), which also surpassed the finales for WandaVision and The Falcon and the Winter Soldier.

=== Critical response ===
The review aggregator website Rotten Tomatoes reported an 89% approval rating with an average score of 7.9/10 based on 28 reviews. The site's critical consensus reads, "Anchored by a trio of strong performances, "For All Time. Always." closes Loki's first chapter with a thrilling finale that has major implications for the multiverse."

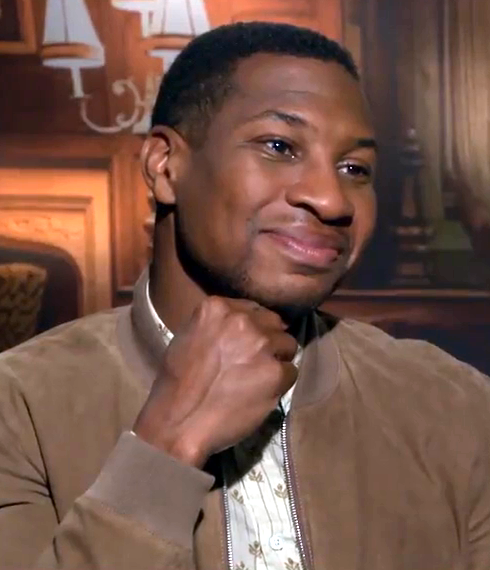
Jonathan Majors' performance as He Who Remains in the episode was highlighted by critics

Alan Sepinwall at Rolling Stone was "simultaneously thrilled and dismayed" by the appearance of Majors in the episode, noting introducing a series' main villain in the final episode was "bad dramatic structure", and that "it briefly felt as if everything that had been so special and appealing about Loki was being brushed aside in order to hype up a new bad guy for the big screen". Additionally, he believed much of the episode should have been "unwatchable" because it had heavy exposition. Yet, Majors' "profoundly weird performance" served the material, making "one hell of a debut" for the character. Sepinwall believed if the finale was examined "as setup for more Loki, in addition to letting MCU viewers get accustomed to a version of Kang", "For All Time. Always." was "a flawed but often fascinating conclusion to just one chapter of the Loki story, rather than the full graphic novel" and "easily the best of this year's three MCU finales".

Joanna Robinson of Vanity Fair agreed that the episode "pulled off the best finale" of the MCU Disney+ series, and noted the strong allusions to the series Lost and the film Seven (1995); Sepinwall also had noted the connections to Lost in the episode. Like Sepinwall, Robinson also felt the Kang reveal should not have worked and noted the large amount of exposition in the episode, stating "There is absolutely zero chance this episode would have worked were it not for Marvel hiring an actor as watchable and unpredictable as Majors", and likened him to Andrew Scott's Jim Moriarty in Sherlock. She was also glad the finale focused on "character and emotion, and kept the world-ending stakes surprisingly personal" and did not feature a large CGI action set piece in the third act.

IGN's Simon Cardy gave "For All Time. Always." a 9 out of 10, saying the "season finale has saved the best for last as it sticks its landing, setting big, universe-altering events on a small stage. It's a culmination of themes, character bonds and promise that results in a thoroughly engaging yet unexpectedly understated 40 minutes. Fantastic writing and a standout debut performance combine to create an episode of television that should change a universe (or multiverse) forever." He added that seeing Majors first appear was an "understated but impactful reveal", praising the "stellar writing" and Majors' acting that exuded the "zany energy of Gene Wilder's Willy Wonka with the underlying terror of Denzel Washington's Detective Alonzo in Training Day" (2001). Cardy did criticize the TVA material, particularly with Renslayer, feeling she remained "a cryptic character, but not in a particularly fun way". Writing for The A.V. Club, Caroline Siede said, "Loki's first season finale doesn't weave together all the threads of the season so much as throw them out the window and start a new tapestry altogether. It's a bold move that makes for a riveting episode and the most unexpected MCU finale yet—even if it's arguably a wildly unsatisfying non-conclusion to the season of TV we just watched." While Siede noted that viewers who had not been familiar with Majors' casting as Kang would have been confused throughout the episode, she felt it worked for both those viewers and those who were expecting a Kang appearance in some form, with Majors giving a "wonderfully capricious performance"; she gave the episode a "B+".

The Hollywood Reporter's Richard Newby said: "In an episode that both broadens the scope of the narrative possibilities and gets to the core of its central characters, the season one finale manages to strike the perfect balance between comic book weirdness and meaningful character studies." David Opie of Digital Spy criticized the introduction of He Who Remains, saying it "came completely out of nowhere" for non-comics readers, feeling that "thematically, another Loki variant would have made for a far more satisfying villain" as that would force Loki "to confront himself and his notions of what it means to be good", opining that characterization was "being overlooked just to move the story along in whatever way Marvel sees fit".

== See also ==
- What If...? (TV series), an animated MCU television series that explores the various branching timelines of the multiverse
