= DeObia Oparei =

British actor (born 1971)

- Born: 7 December 1971 (age 54); Hackney, London, England
- Occupation: Actor
- Years active: 1992–present

DeObia Oparei (born 7 December 1971) is an English actor. They (Note: Oparei uses they/them pronouns.) are best known for playing the Gunner in Pirates of the Caribbean: On Stranger Tides (2011), Rongo in Dumbo (2019), Loki Hayes in Santa Clarita Diet (2017), and Boastful Loki in Loki (2021).

== Early life ==
Oparei was born on 7 December 1971 in Hackney, London, to parents of Nigerian ancestry.

== Career ==
Oparei began their career working for various British theatre companies, like The Royal Shakespeare Company and The National Youth Theatre. Oparei's film debut was a small supporting role in Alien 3. After playing the lead role of American playwright John Guare's Six Degrees of Separation, Oparei scored their next supporting film role, as "Le Chocolat", in the Baz Luhrmann film Moulin Rouge!. In 1993, they appeared in an episode of the popular British television series Minder as 'Winston', a worker for Arthur Daley.

Operai moved to Sydney, Australia in 1995, where they co-hosted the regular night 'Magic' upstairs at Kinselas with Basil, and performed Operai's Queen bitch rap in cLUB bENT at The Performance Space, with Darren Spowart and Matthew Bergin.

Oparei is also a playwright. Their first play, Crazyblackmuthafuckin'self, a dramedy about race, sexuality and identity, opened to critical acclaim at the Royal Court Theatre in 2002. The Guardian's Michael Billington described the play as "wild, raunchy and funny". The play later toured to Sydney, Australia, as part of the 2003 Company B Belvoir International Playreading Series, at the Belvoir Street Downstairs Theatre, on 11 August 2003.

In 2015, Oparei joined the cast of the HBO epic fantasy series Game of Thrones in its fifth season, portraying the character Areo Hotah. In 2017, they joined the cast of Santa Clarita Diet as Loki Hayes, and in 2019 joined the cast of Loki (2019) as Boastful Loki, the latter role in reference to the former.

== Personal life ==
On 5 June 2020, they came out as gay on Instagram.

== Filmography ==
=== Film ===
Year	Title	Role	Notes
1992	Alien 3	Arthur	
1998	Dark City	Train Passenger	
2001	Moulin Rouge!	Le Chocolat	
2002	Dirty Pretty Things	Mini-Cab Driver	
2002	The Four Feathers	Idris-Es-Saier	
2003	The Foreigner	Richard	
2004	Thunderbirds	Mullion	
2005	7 Seconds	Spanky	Direct-to-video; Credited as Dhobi Oparei
2005	Doom	Sergeant Gannon "Destroyer" Roark	
2009	Thick as Thieves	Rawls	
2009	Green Street 2: Stand Your Ground	Derrick Jackson	Direct-to-video
2010	Mr. Nice	Tee Bone Taylor	
2010	Death Race 2	Big Bill	
2010	The Presence	Woodsman	
2011	Your Highness	Thundarian	
2011	Pirates of the Caribbean: On Stranger Tides	Gunner	
2012	Dredd	TJ the Paramedic	
2013	Tula: The Revolt	Hacha	
2016	Independence Day: Resurgence	Dikembe Umbutu	
2019	Dumbo	Rongo	
2019	Jumanji: The Next Level	Gromm	Credited as Deobia Oparei
2021	Wrath of Man	Brad	
2022	The Gray Man	Dulin	

=== Television ===
Year	Title	Role	Notes
1990	Blood Rights	Winston	3 episodes
1990	Desmond's	Willy	Episode: "Auntie Susu"
1990	Medics	King	Episode: "Iraj"
1992	Between the Lines	Ruby	Episode: "Nothing Personal"
1993	Minder	Winston	Episode: "Cars and Pints and Pains"
1998	Wildside	Bernice	
1998	Trial & Retribution	DC Palmer	
2002	Holby City	Dave Whellan	Episode: "Hearts and Minds"
2015	Proof	Mr. Oumandi	2 episodes
2015–2016	Game of Thrones	Areo Hotah	6 episodes
2017	Emerald City	Sullivan	Episode: "Mistress - New - Mistress"
2017	Santa Clarita Diet	Loki Hayes	2 episodes
2017	The Orville	Captain Vorak	Episode: "About a Girl"
2019	Sex Education	Mr. Effiong	
2021	Loki	Boastful Loki	Episodes: "The Nexus Event" and "Journey into Mystery"

=== Shorts ===
- 2015: Clones

=== Synchronisations ===
- 2009: League of Legends
- 2018: World of Warcraft: Battle for Azeroth
