= Sylvie (Marvel Cinematic Universe) =

Character in the Marvel Cinematic Universe

Sylvie Laufeydottir
- Marvel Cinematic Universe character
- Sophia Di Martino as Sylvie in "The Nexus Event" (Loki, 2021).
- First appearance: "Glorious Purpose"; Loki Season 1; June 9, 2021
- Based on: Sylvie Lushton by; Paul Cornell; Mark Brooks; Lady Loki by; J. Michael Straczynski; Olivier Coipel
- Adapted by: Michael Waldron
- Portrayed by: Sophia Di Martino; Cailey Fleming (young)

In-universe information
- Full name: Sylvie Laufeydottir (born Loki)
- Nickname: The Variant
- Species: Frost Giant
- Weapon: Enchantment
- Significant other: Loki (2012 variant)
- Origin: Asgard (childhood home); Jotunheim (birthplace)
- Nationality: Asgardian

Sylvie Laufeydottir (born Loki) is a fictional character portrayed by Sophia Di Martino in the Marvel Cinematic Universe (MCU) media franchise, partially based on the Marvel Comics characters Lady Loki and Sylvie Lushton's Enchantress. She is depicted as an alternate version of the supervillain Loki and joins forces with another version of them to overthrow the Time Variance Authority (TVA).

Blaming the TVA for stealing her life, Sylvie allies with Loki, and later Hunter B-15 and Mobius, to hunt down the creator of the TVA. After finding the creator, He Who Remains, she kills him, freeing the Multiverse but betrays Loki in the process. After going to work at McDonald's, Sylvie returns to the TVA to help them fix the Temporal Loom.

Di Martino has portrayed the character in both seasons of the Disney+ television show Loki (2021–2023), and the character made her comic debut in the spin-off limited comic series TVA (2024–2025). Di Martino's portrayal of the character has been received positively by critics and fans, though some were initially confused about her identity; she received several awards and nominations.

== Concept and casting ==
By November 2018, it was announced that a television show would premiere on the then-upcoming Disney streaming service Disney+ about the Marvel Cinematic Universe (MCU) character Loki. By February 2019, Michael Waldron was hired as the show's head writer and executive producer for the show, eventually revealed to be titled Loki. That year, English actress Sophia Di Martino auditioned for the show alongside Loki's actor, Tom Hiddleston, under the false names "Bob" and "Sarah", and was not told until afterwards which role she was auditioning for. By November, Di Martino was cast in the show with reports indicating that she would be portraying a female version of Loki in some shape or form.

Director Kate Herron pitched the character with "a brand new backstory in a brand new story" with her physicality and mannerisms similar to Hiddleston's Loki. Di Martino also noted that while it was important to make the character unique and original, she would retain the important aspects of Loki's personality. Herron praised Di Martino's casting, saying "she brings this amazing vulnerability to all her characters", and helped craft Sylvie as an alternate version of Loki who can hold her own without taking the attention away from her alternate counterpart.

Hiddleston expressed excitement for Di Martino taking the role, commenting: "I cannot wait for audiences to see Sophia in this [...] she has mischief, playfulness, maybe a little bit of interior fragmentation and some broken emotions [...] she made it completely her own [with] her own preparation and research and it was such a fun dynamic". He added that it would "destabilizing" for Loki to meet an alternate version of himself.

== Characterization ==
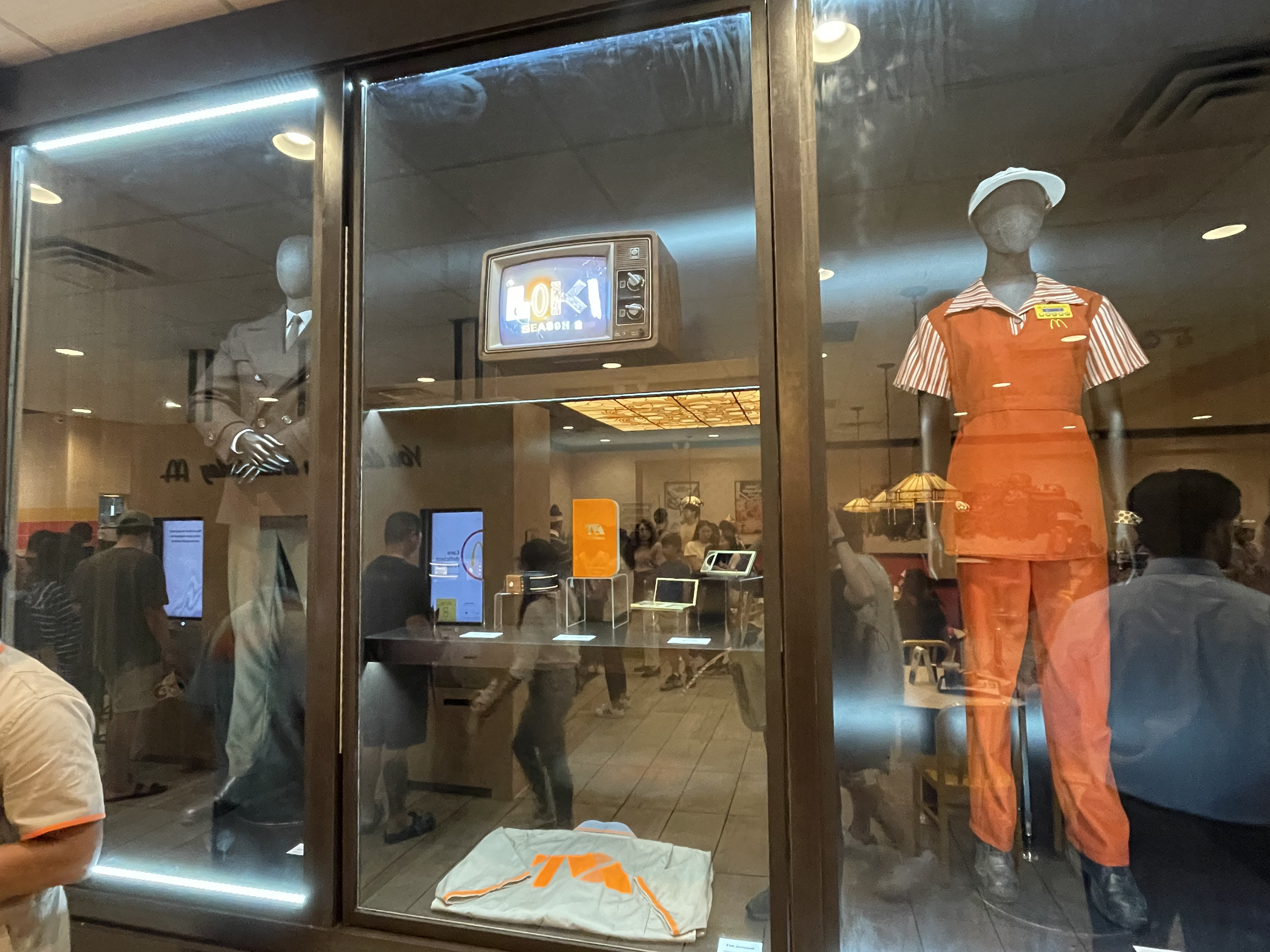
Sylvie's McDonald's uniform as pictured on display (right) in Brooklyn, New York City during promotion for Loki season two

=== Personality and appearances ===
Sylvie first appeared in season one of Loki (2021). In the show, Sylvie joins forces with Loki in taking down the TVA, an organization located outside of space and time which governs all of time. With the help of Mobius and Hunter B-15, the pair discover the TVA is being run by androids, and eventually encounters the real creator, He Who Remains, an alternate version of Kang the Conqueror. Initially at odds with Loki about it, Sylvie kills He Who Remains freeing the Multiverse, and sends Loki back to the TVA after sharing a kiss. On her role in season one, Di Martino found that Sylvie was "just on a revenge mission" due to "having her life ruined". Herron also found Sylvie to be driven by revenge, pain, and anger, and compared her to her counterpart in Thor (2011). Herron interpreted the kiss between Sylvie and Loki as a goodbye kiss, and that while Sylvie's feelings were genuine, her will to take down the TVA was stronger. American child actress Cailey Fleming also portrayed a younger version of Sylvie.

Di Martino reprised her role in the second season of Loki (2023). After killing He Who Remains, Sylvie travelled to Broxton, Oklahoma in the 1980s, and begins working at a McDonald's. Sylvie working in Broxton, Oklahoma is a reference to the location of Asgard in comics during the late 2000's and early 2010's. A 1980s McDonald's was specifically written into the script, with executive producer Kevin R. Wright calling the experience for Sylvie a "love letter to nostalgia through [her] eyes who will see all of the novelty and joy of it". In the second season, Sylvie reunites with Loki, Mobius, B-15 and other TVA workers Ouroboros and Casey, and assists them in fixing the Temporal Loom with the help of Victor Timely, another variant of He Who Remains. In the end, Loki sacrifices himself as a replacement for the Loom, giving Sylvie her freedom despite the cost of never seeing Loki again.

Sylvie made her Marvel Comics debut in the spin-off comic book limited series TVA (2024–2025), written by Katharyn Blair, one of the writers for Loki season two. The story picks up after the events of Deadpool & Wolverine (2024), and features Sylvie returning to the TVA to assist B-15 and a group of heroes (including variants of Spider-Gwen and Captain Carter), in finding out who almost killed Mobius. Kevin Erdmann, writing for Screen Rant, called the comic an unofficial season three of Loki.

=== Costume design and portrayal ===
Di Martino, Herron, costume designer Christine Wada and hair designer Amy Wood designed Sylvie to be as practical as possible while acknowledging the character's life being a "dirty job" to stray away from stereotypical feminine costumes such as high heels. Her helmet's broken horn was inspired by Lady Loki's headpiece in the comics, and illustrated how rough her life had been and how she is practically "broken" inside. Due to Di Martino recently having given birth, hidden zippers were added to her costume so she could nurse her baby between takes. In season two, she dons a 1970s-themed McDonald's uniform which Di Martino called a metaphor for Sylvie "being able to try and live a normal life and enjoy what she's created".

Di Martino noted she found ways to incorporate her native English accent to contrast with Hiddleston's Loki while also keeping the Asgardian accent, not wanting to sound too posh or too well spoken. Like Loki, Sylvie is also depicted as bisexual, an aspect Herron and Di Martino found to be important for representation and to honor the Norse mythology of the character. Los Angeles Times writer Tracy Brown noted that this inclusion mimics the comics, calling it "a big step for the MCU, which has for years been called out for its abysmal track record when it comes to LGBTQ inclusion".

=== Relationship with Loki ===
[Loki] sees things in Sylvie that he is like, 'Oh, I've been there. I know what you feel.' But she's like, 'Well, I don't feel that way.' And I think that was the kind of fun thing about it. She is him, but she's not him. They’ve had such different life experiences. So just from an identity perspective, it was interesting to dig into that.

— Director Kate Herron on the misgivings about Sylvie and Loki's relationship.

Throughout Loki, Sylvie is depicted as Loki's love interest, an idea formed in the earliest pitches of the show from Waldron who wanted his reluctant relationship with her to develop his character in "the hope that maybe that it's also about [Loki] learning to forgive himself". He added that he wanted Sylvie to play a role in Loki's self-actualization and redemption from the villainous depiction in previous MCU media, commenting that "in meeting Sylvie and having a mirror held up to him, for the first time he feels [affection] about himself". To misgivings about their romance, Hiddleston noted that "Sylvie's not Loki, Sylvie is Sylvie", while Herron called their relationship "unique".

Critics were intrigued by Sylvie's relationship with Loki with Waldron finding it necessary to further character development. Christian P. Haines, a philosopher and assistant English professor at Penn State University, discussed with Gizmodo the implications of their romance,

The question is less, 'does this count as incest', and more 'what would happen if this really basic social rule were loosened?' [...] Would chaos roil the multiverse or would things be pretty much the same, except we wouldn't take for granted even the most basic social and cultural rules? That strikes me as a very Loki proposition: not revolution, really, more an acerbic irony that undermines self-serious assumptions about human nature or what it means to be 'civilized'.

BBC Culture critic Stephen Kelly opined that the relationship would likely result in "some of the most perverse fan fiction the internet has ever seen". Andi Ortiz of TheWrap felt that the relationship would be "a little hard to make it work long term" but praised it and Hiddleston and Di Martino's performances opining they "have the right chemistry as actors".

== Original comic derivations ==
Sylvie is an original character created for the Marvel Cinematic Universe (MCU), with inspiration taken from two characters in the mainstream comics set in the Marvel Universe (Earth-616): Lady Loki, a female version of the Marvel Comics supervillain Loki who debuted in Thor Vol. 2 #80 following the Ragnarok event; and Sylvie Lushton, the second iteration of the Enchantress introduced in Dark Reign: Young Avengers #1. In the comics, Lushton is a girl from Broxton, Oklahoma who receives magical powers granted to her when Asgardians took over her home; Later, she became known as the "Goddess of Mischief", a moniker that the show adapted onto Sylvie. Fatherly summarised Sylvie as a combination of Lushton and Lady Loki into " Loki Variant who uses the alias Sylvie".

== Fictional character biography ==
=== Early life ===
Loki was born a Frost Giant and abandoned as an infant by her father Laufey, being raised in Asgard as their princess. She is arrested by Ravonna Renslayer on behalf of the Time Variance Authority (TVA) as a child for "crimes against the Sacred Timeline". She is brought into the TVA headquarters and into the courtroom, where she steals Renslayer's TemPad and escapes the TVA through a Timedoor. Over the following centuries, Loki learns to hide herself from the TVA, adopting the alias "Sylvie" and developing a method of body possession, dubbed 'Enchantment', to achieve her ends.

=== Life as a fugitive ===
While living as a fugitive, Sylvie kills several units of TVA Minutemen, such as in 1858 Oklahoma, and steals their reset charges. She travels to 2050 Alabama and is tracked down by another variant of herself during a hurricane there, where, upon rejecting his offer to work together to overthrow the Time-Keepers and revealing herself to him, she executes her scheme; teleporting the charges she stole to various locations across the timelines, causing branches to form on the Sacred Timeline to distract the TVA so that she can assassinate the Time-Keepers. She teleports away to the TVA headquarters via a Time Door.

==== Bonding with Loki ====
Sylvie and Loki are confronted by Renslayer. As Sylvie threatens to kill Loki, Loki uses a TemPad to teleport them to the moon Lamentis-1 in 2077 while it is being destroyed by a falling planet. After learning the TemPad needs to be charged for them to use it, Sylvie and Loki join forces to escape the moon, masquerading as a guard and his prisoner to get onto an evacuation train, where Sylvie and Loki bond over drinks and the differences in their pasts. After being discovered and thrown off the train, Loki accidentally breaks the TemPad. Sylvie and Loki plan to instead hijack the evacuation ship, which according to the "Sacred Timeline" will be destroyed before leaving the moon, only to fail. Loki learns from Sylvie that everyone in the TVA are variants hunting other variants, to which Loki reveals to Sylvie that the majority of variants working for the TVA, including Mobius M. Mobius and Hunter B-15, are unaware that they themselves are variants.

With the TemPad broken, Sylvie and Loki come to peace at their impending deaths. After the pair form a romantic bond which spawns a Nexus Event perpendicular to the Sacred Timeline, they are arrested by the TVA, with Hunter B-15 secretly taking Sylvie to RoxxCart in 2050 to learn the truth about herself and her life before the TVA. Loki and Sylvie are taken to the Time-Keepers, accompanied by Renslayer and a group of Minutemen. Hunter B-15 intervenes, freeing them of their collars, and in the ensuing fight, the Minutemen are killed whilst Renslayer is knocked unconscious by Sylvie. Sylvie then beheads one of the Time-Keepers, who turn out to all be androids. Renslayer regains her consciousness and prunes Loki.

==== Killing He Who Remains ====
Sylvie demands the truth from Renslayer, who is just as unaware of the creation of the TVA as she is. Renslayer and Miss Minutes tell her that Loki was not killed but sent to the Void at the End of Time when he was pruned, leading Sylvie to deduce that whoever is beyond the Void is the actual creator of the TVA. After Minutemen arrive to capture her, she prunes herself and reunites with Mobius, who takes her to Loki and other variants of herself in order to make a plan to escape Alioth, a monstrous cloud-like entity which consumes matter. She and Loki combine their powers to enchant Alioth while Classic Loki buys time by distracting the creature, sacrificing himself in the process. Loki and Sylvie successfully subdue Alioth and move past the Void. Noticing a citadel in the distance, the pair walk towards it.

Upon entering the Citadel at the End of Time, Loki and Sylvie encounter Miss Minutes, who was directly created by the TVA's creator. She offers them a chance to escape by arranging a deal that would allow them to be placed back on the timeline and live a life where all their desires are fulfilled. They decline her offer, realizing that is destiny that brought them to the end of time. They meet the real creator of the TVA, a man named "He Who Remains" who cannot be killed by Sylvie's efforts because he knows everything that will happen in the future. He reveals the true history of the TVA and it ended the multiversal war waged by his infinite variants. Sylvie tries to kill him but is stopped by Loki, who pleads with her to reason, but she cannot trust what either says and fights Loki. However, she kisses him and acknowledges their romantic connection, but takes He Who Remains' TemPad and pushes Loki through a Timedoor. In order to enact vengeance for all the suffering the TVA brought upon her and believing He Who Remains to be feinting them, Sylvie kills him, who tells her that he would "see her soon". Realizing that He Who Remains was not lying about what he warned, she watches in anguish as the timeline branches and a multiverse is formed.

=== Returning to the TVA ===
==== Working at McDonald's ====
After killing He Who Remains, Sylvie walks through a Timedoor into a branched timeline in 1982 Broxton, Oklahoma, and visits a McDonald's restaurant. She gets hired and makes a life for herself. Sometime later, working as a cashier, she is tracked down by Loki and Mobius with the help of Brad Wolfe. Loki informs Sylvie that the TVA is in danger and that he saw her in the TVA's future hoping to enlist her help. However, Sylvie declines saying she is happy with her new life and wants nothing to do with the TVA. After Wolfe confesses that they are in mortal danger, Sylvie enchants him, learning of General Dox's plan to bomb and prune all the branched timelines. She travels with Loki and Mobius to her location, and manage to stop her but not before multiple branched timelines are reset and pruned. Sylvie follows them back to the TVA and berates Loki and the TVA for not stopping Dox in time. She departs back to Broxton.

She tracks Victor Timely, a variant of He Who Remains to the 1893 Chicago World's Fair and attempts to kill him on a Ferris wheel before being stopped by Loki. The two engage in a fight while Miss Minutes, who is there with Renslayer, enlarges herself to scare away the crowds. She later follows Loki, Mobius, Renslayer, and Timely to Timely's laboratory in Wisconsin before blasting them all back. She is about to kill Timely before sparing him realizing she herself would be hypocritical for not allowing free will. While Loki and Mobius take Timely back to the TVA, she confronts Renslayer and kicks her into a Timedoor through to the Citadel.

==== Fixing the Temporal Loom ====
Sylvie returns to TVA and meets with Loki, Mobius, Timely, B-15, Casey, and Ouroboros "O. B." as the Temporal Loom reaches critical. While O.B., Timely and Casey work on fixing the Loom, Sylvie gets mad at Mobius for not taking the threat seriously, berating him for not understanding the personal stakes at hand. She and Loki also share a discussion about the implications for their actions. On the way back to the Loom, Renslayer hijacks the TVA with the help of Miss Minutes, causing Sylvie to get trapped in an elevator. They also kill Dox and her guards while kidnapping Timely with Wolfe's help. When Sylvie gets the elevator open, she encounters the past version of Loki who gets pruned by the current Loki, much to her confusion. After O.B. takes Miss Minutes off-line, Sylvie is able to enchant Wolfe and prunes Renslayer. Returning to the Loom with Timely, Sylvie and the others watch as he goes to put a "Multiplier" in, but the temporal radiation spaghettifies him instantly. The Loom explodes sending a blast wave towards the TVA.

After the explosion, Sylvie is reset back to Broxton and continued her life working at McDonald's. One night, after a shift, she finds Loki who asks if she remembers him. She sees him time-slipping for the first time and invites him out for a drink. She gets Loki to admit that his true motivation in saving the TVA is his fear of losing his friends and being alone. She encourages him to go find a life for himself instead. Later, she goes to a record store, listens to a song from Loaded before realizing that her universe is dissolving and spaghettifying around her. Evacuating through a Timedoor, she locates Loki who has reunited all his friends on O.B.'s variant A.D. Doug's universe, telling them that they need to save the Loom as everything is dying. Before they can do anything, she and the others are spaghettified away.

Loki learns to control his time-slipping, and as he tries to save the Loom, Sylvie and the others return multiple times, much to her suspicion at how he is acting. During one attempt, she wonders aloud if it was her actions in killing He Who Remains to blame. Loki timeslips back to when Sylvie kills He Who Remains, but fails multiple times in trying to stop her. After confronting He Who Remains, Loki timeslips back to Doug's universe and tells Sylvie that the Loom is a failsafe designed to protect the Sacred Timeline. She realizes that she has to be killed in order to prevent what is happening, but Loki refuses to do so. She states that despite a looming multiversal war, she believes that they along with everyone else should have a chance and be able to fight. Loki timeslips back to the TVA control room. Sylvie along with the others watch on as Loki breaks the Loom and uses his own magic to save the branched timelines. He takes the timelines through a rift to remains of the Citadel at the End of Time and rearranges the multiverse into the shape of Yggdrasil. Much to her sadness, Sylvie states that he gave them all a chance by sacrificing himself as a replacement for the Loom. Sometime later, she meets with Mobius at Cleveland who watches on at his variant's life, before telling him that she did not know what she would do next.

==== The Madness ====
Sometime later, (Note: Following the events of Deadpool & Wolverine (2024).) Sylvie begins to investigate a disturbance called "The Madness" causing people across various timelines to experience their worst fears. She tails variants working with the TVA of Spider-Gwen and Gambit, and returns with them to the TVA to find that Mobius has been stabbed by an unknown culprit. She reunites with B-15, and meets other variants, including those of Captain Carter and Jimmy Hudson, to try and find out who stabbed him. Meanwhile, Spider-Gwen finds a secret department in the TVA and releases a variant of the Scarlet Witch in cryostasis. Nightmare is revealed to be the culprit and attempts to recruit the Scarlet Witch. After Nightmare is defeated with the help of a Flerken and Dreamqueen, Sylvie releases the Scarlet Witch, despite Gwen's intention to make her stay.

== Reception ==
=== Critical response ===
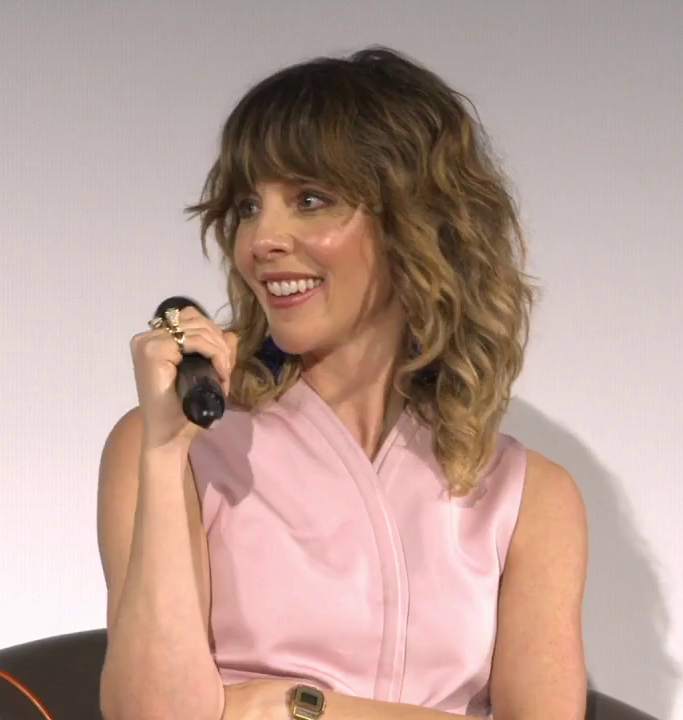
English actress Sophia Di Martino (pictured) received positive reviews for her role, including winning two MTV Movie & TV Awards

Upon her debut, the character has been received positively among critics and fans despite initial misgivings and confusion over her identity. In a review of the episode "Lamentis" where Sylvie made a full appearance, Nola Pfau writing for Vulture took note of her "insistence on not being called a Loki", opining that it made her tragic but also likable as she "knows herself" and "has had to fight just to live as herself". Time's Eliana Dockterman deemed her a "nuanced and compelling" character, adding that "it will be a real bummer if everything that goes wrong in the MCU for the next decade will be 'Sylvie's fault'" because of her actions in the Loki episode "For All Time. Always.". Conversely, Simon Cardy of IGN found that Sylvie's choice in the episode "makes complete sense for her character development," and Rolling Stone writer Alan Sepinwall opined that she was driven by revenge. Deseret News writer Herb Scribner called Sylvie the "MVP" of the show because of how she "drove most of the story" and actually completed her task in bringing down the TVA and creating free will.

In a review for Sylvie's role in season two, The Harvard Crimson writer Kieran Farrell opined that the season felt "rather weak in its handling of Sylvie", feeling that the character was pushed to the background "mainly only serving to bicker with Loki about the need for an unmitigated multiverse to exist". They added that this conflict took away from their romantic relationship established in the first season. Variety writer Alison Herman wrote the same, noting that there was "less space" for Loki and Sylvie's bond when "everyone is racing around for unclear reasons".

The character has been popular among fans, with Di Martino being number one on IMDb's "STARmeter" during season one's airing. Empire called her "an instant new favourite" MCU character, and Screen Rant opined that this was "a real testament to how Marvel can cast a relatively unknown actor and launch them into immediate stardom by way of the MCU". Di Martino has received positive responses for her portrayl with IGN writer Simon Cardy finding her to have "play[ed the role] beautifully, bringing a touching sense of humanity". Brady Langmann of Esquire opined that Di Martino's turn as Sylvie "has already blown far past many of Marvel's depictions of women."

=== Accolades ===
Year	Work	Award	Category	Result	Ref(s)
2022	Loki	Critics' Choice Super Awards	Best Actress in a Superhero Series	Nominated	
2022	Loki	MTV Movie & TV Awards	Best Breakthrough Performance	Won	
2022	Loki	MTV Movie & TV Awards	Best Team ^{(with Tom Hiddleston and Owen Wilson)}	Won	
2022	Loki	Hollywood Critics Association TV Awards	Best Supporting Actress in a Streaming Series, Drama	Nominated	
2024	Loki	Critics' Choice Television Awards	Best Supporting Actress in a Drama Series	Nominated	
2024	Loki	Critics' Choice Super Awards	Best Actress in a Superhero Series, Limited Series or Made-for-TV Movie	Nominated	

== In other media ==
=== Video games ===
- Sylvie Laufeydottir appears as a playable character in Marvel: Future Fight (2015) and Marvel Strike Force (2018).

=== Merchandise ===
Two days after her appearance in the Loki episode "Lamentis", Funko announced two different Funko variants of the character, with one of these being a glow in the dark Walmart-exclusive. In 2022, Funko also released a "Pop! Moment" piece depicting Sylvie and Loki in Lamentis. In 2023, for season two, Funko released another variant of Sylvie. In 2022, Hasbro released a Marvel Legends action figure of Sylvie based on her outfit in season one.

== See also ==
- Characters of the Marvel Cinematic Universe
- Loki (Marvel Comics)
- Norse mythology in popular culture
