= John Roesch =

American Foley artist

- Occupation: Foley artist
- Known for: Film sound effects
- Awards: Golden Reel Awards for The Dark Knight and The Matrix

John Roesch is an American Foley artist. Roesch is the head Foley artist at Lucasfilm's Skywalker Ranch.

Roesch has provided Foley sound effects for over 400 films, including The Dark Knight, The Dark Knight Rises, the Matrix trilogy, The Green Mile, and E.T. Roesch received a 2013 career achievement award during the Motion Picture Sound Editors’ 60th Golden Reel Awards ceremony.

== Career ==
John Roesch graduated from New York University with a degree in filmmaking and entered the film industry in 1978. He started as a Foley artist working at Gomillion Sound before eventually moving on to Samuel Goldwyn Studios, which was then folded into Warner Hollywood Studios.

John Roesch is responsible for producing many sound effects for film and entertainment. His notable sounds include R2-D2 in Star Wars: The Empire Strikes Back, E.T.'s body movements, and the sounds of Trinity’s latex body suit in the film The Matrix.

After working with Warner Hollywood, Roesch moved on to work at Taj Soundworks in 1983. In 1992, he left Taj Soundworks and returned to Warner Hollywood until 2000. He is now the lead Foley artist at Skywalker Ranch. His Foley work on the 2022 TV show Andor led him to receive nominations from the Primetime Emmy and Golden Reel Awards.
