= Mobius M. Mobius =

Marvel Comics characters

- Mobius as depicted in She-Hulk (vol. 2) #3 (December 2005). Art by Don Simpson (penciller/inker) and David Kemper (colorist).

Publication information
- Publisher: Marvel Comics
- First appearance: As Mobius M. Mobius: Fantastic Four #346 (November 1990); As Mr. Tesseract: Fantastic Four Annual #27 (1994); As Mr. Ouroboros: She-Hulk #3 (February 2006); As Mr. Paradox: She-Hulk #3 (May 2006)
- Created by: Walter Simonson

In-story information
- Alter ego: Mobius Mobius Mobius
- Team affiliations: Time Variance Authority
- Notable aliases: Moby; Mr. Mobius; Mr. Tesseract; Mr. Ouroboros; Mr. Paradox

Mobius M. Mobius is a character appearing in American comic books published by Marvel Comics. Created by writer/artist Walter Simonson, the earliest incarnation of the character first appeared in Fantastic Four #346 (November 1990). Various versions of Mobius from different points in time (and other clones of him) make up the bureaucratic leadership and middle management of the timekeeping organization known as the Time Variance Authority, including Mr. Tesseract, Mr. Ouroboros, and Mr. Paradox.

Mobius appears in the Marvel Cinematic Universe (MCU) series Loki (2021–2023) and in a post-credits scene cameo in the film Ant-Man and the Wasp: Quantumania (2023), played by Owen Wilson. Ke Huy Quan plays a TVA engineer named Ouroboros "O.B." in Loki season 2 (2023), and Matthew Macfadyen plays a TVA agent named Mr. Paradox in the film Deadpool & Wolverine (2024). Following Loki season 2, the MCU's TVA and its characters appear to supersede Marvel comics' older TVA portrayals as the main comics continuity's TVA, beginning with Web of Spider-Man (2024), and featuring in the TVA comic series.

== Publication history ==
Mobius M. Mobius first appeared in Fantastic Four #346, cover date November 1990, created by writer/artist Walter Simonson. Cloned managers for the Time Variance Authority that resemble Mark Gruenwald — and, later, Tom DeFalco — both longtime Marvel Comics writers. The most frequent recurring manager is Mobius M. Mobius, who is based on Gruenwald.

== Fictional character biography ==
Mobius M. Mobius is a bureaucrat and middle management for the Time Variance Authority (TVA), who attempted to discipline the Fantastic Four for violations of the TVA's laws.

Justice Might, Justice Truth, and Justice Liberty are three officers who aided Mobius in recapturing the Fantastic Four while they were running loose inside the Null-Time Zone.

In Venom War, Mobius (appearing to be the MCU character as portrayed by Owen Wilson) and the TVA arrive on Earth-616 to arrest Jimmy Hudson, who had been displaced to Earth-616 from another universe.

== Variants ==
=== Mr. Tesseract ===
Mr. Tesseract is a past version of and subordinate to Mobius. He was assigned to reconstruct lost data from Earth-616.

=== Mr. Paradox ===
Mr. Paradox is a judge and a future version of Mobius. He is erased from existence when Clockwise blasts him with a Retro-Active Cannon.

=== Mr. Ouroboros ===
Mr. Ouroboros is a judge and Mr. Paradox's clone. He is erased from existence when Clockwise blasts Mr. Paradox with a Retro-Active Cannon. Ouroboros is later reintroduced and redesigned to resemble his Marvel Cinematic Universe counterpart.

== In other media ==
=== Marvel Cinematic Universe ===
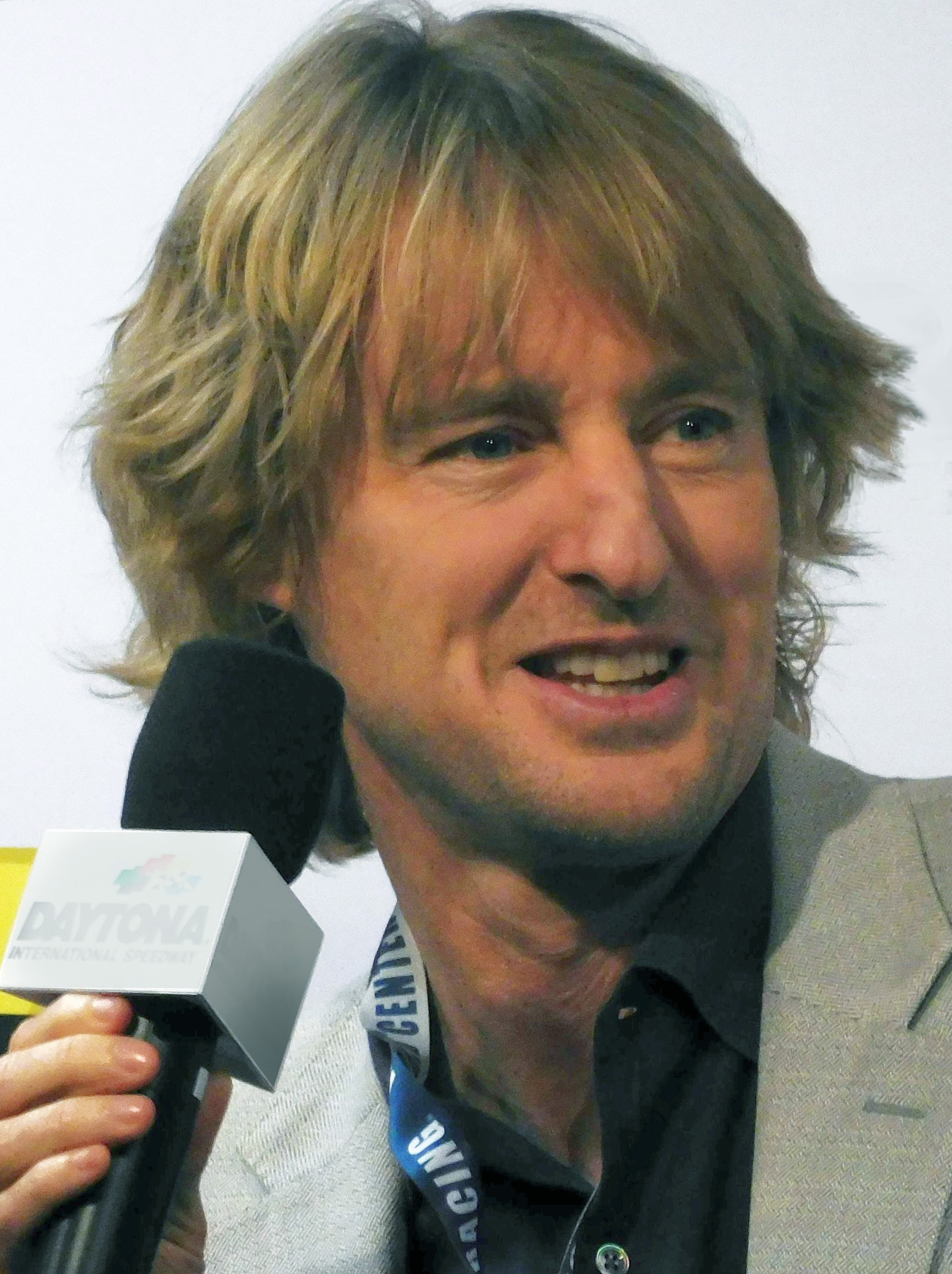
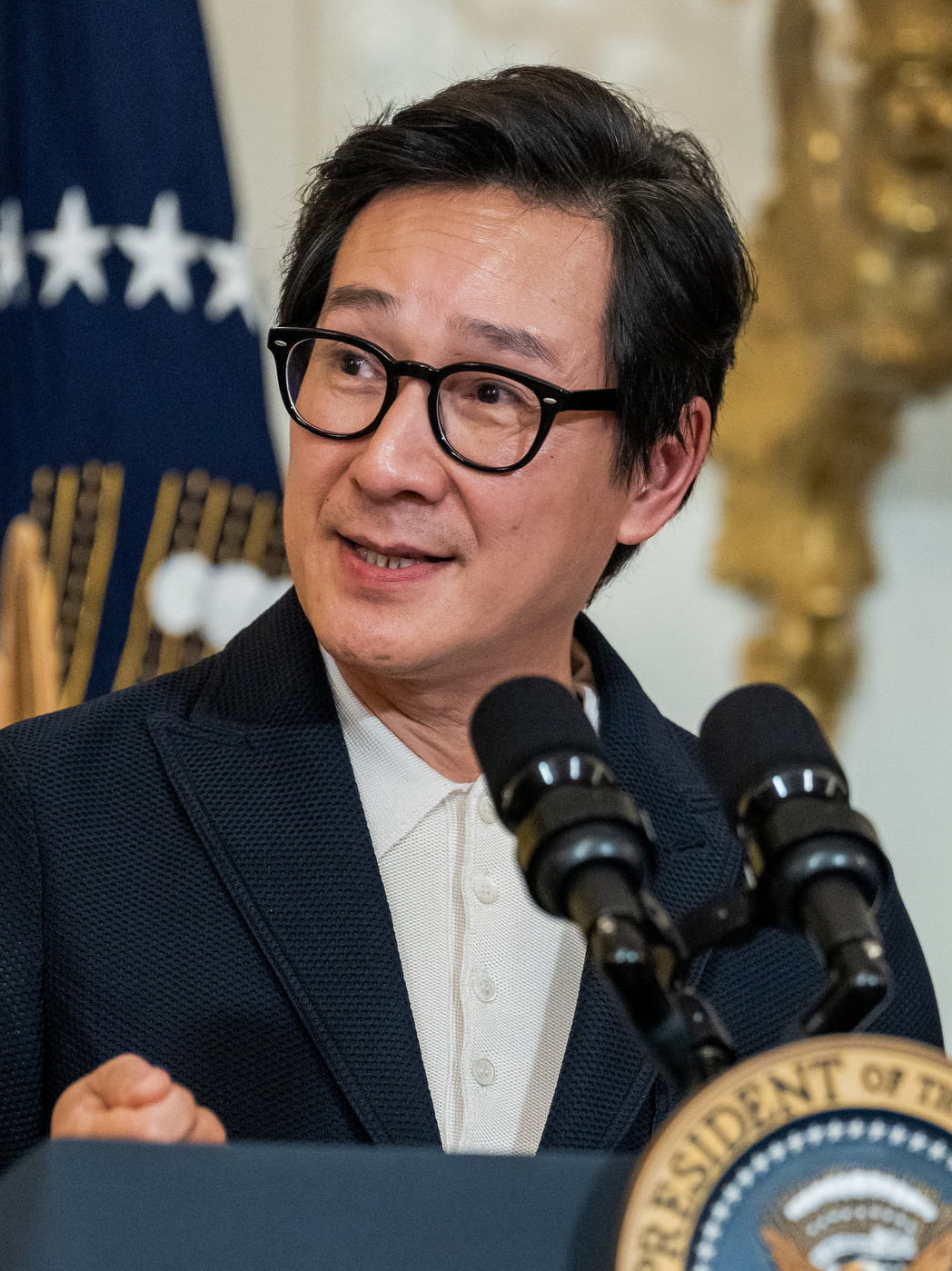
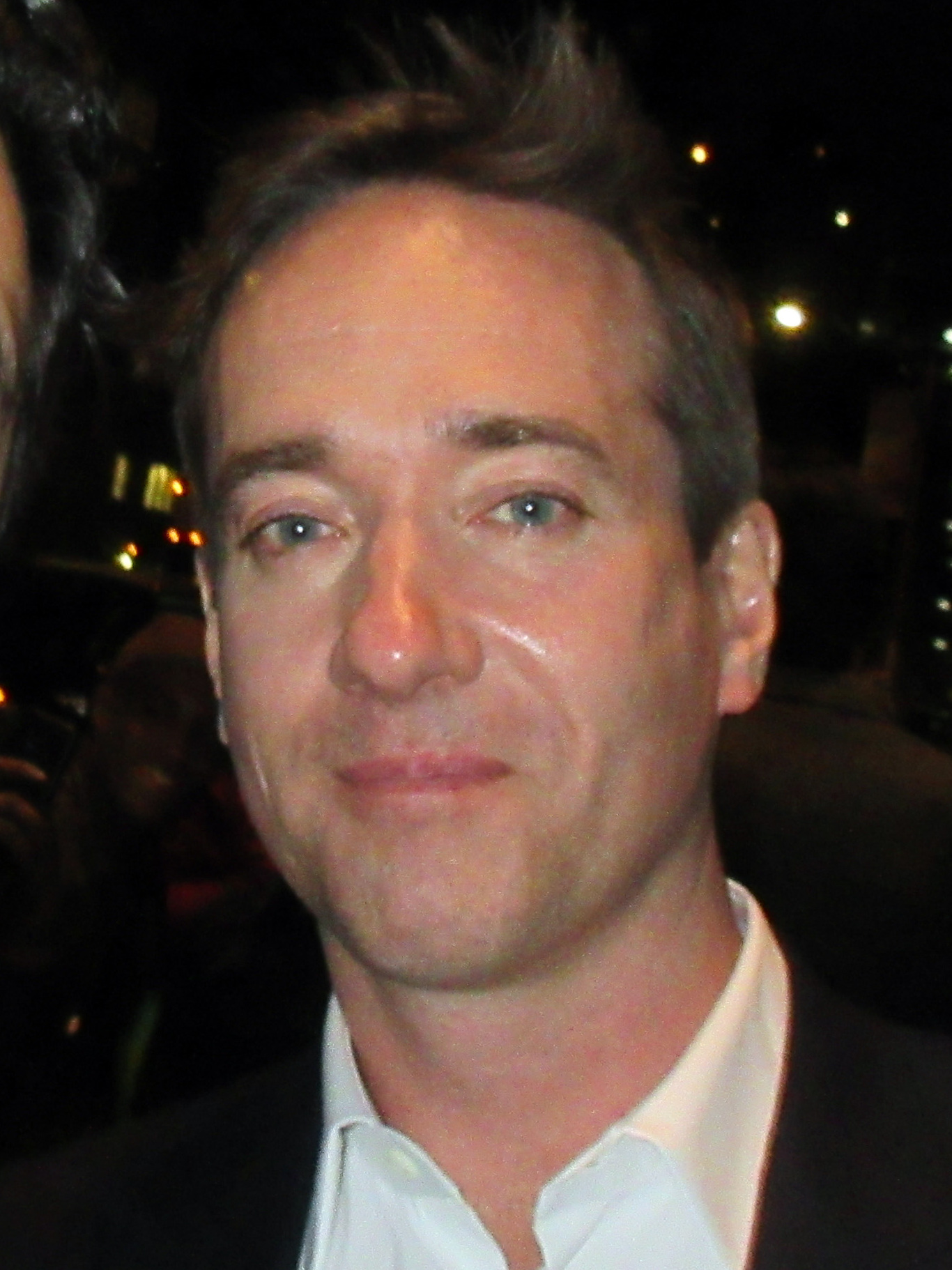
(L–R): Owen Wilson, Ke Huy Quan, and Matthew Macfadyen have played different separate characters based on Mobius and his clones.

Iterations of Mobius M. Mobius and his counterparts appear in the Marvel Cinematic Universe (MCU), portrayed by Owen Wilson, Ke Huy Quan, and Matthew Macfadyen, depicted as separate individual "variants" instead of identical clones of the same character.

==== Mobius ====
- Mobius appears in the television series Loki (2021–2023), portrayed by Owen Wilson. In the episode "Science/Fiction", Mobius is revealed to be a temporal variant of Don, a jet ski salesman and single father-of-two, who also cameos in the series finale "Glorious Purpose".
- Mobius makes a cameo appearance in the post-credits scene of the film Ant-Man and the Wasp: Quantumania (2023), portrayed again by an uncredited Owen Wilson, in a scene taken from the then-unreleased episode "1893".

==== O.B. ====
- Ouroboros "O.B." appears in the second season of Loki (2023), portrayed by Ke Huy Quan. O.B. is the Time Variance Authority's chief engineer, who deals with the maintenance and repair of their complex tools, including time travel devices. In the episode "Science/Fiction", O.B. is revealed to be a temporal variant of Dr. A.D. Doug, a failed science fiction author and theoretical physics teacher at Caltech in 1994.

==== Mr. Paradox ====
- Mr. Paradox appears as the secondary antagonist in Deadpool & Wolverine (2024), portrayed by Matthew Macfadyen. This version is an agent of the TVA seeking to become its leader to revert the organization back to its old ways, who has been assigned to oversee the slowly disintegrating Earth-10005, due to the death of its "anchor being", Wolverine. Growing frustrated with the process and TVA new status quo of not pruning, Paradox creates the Time Ripper to destroy Earth-10005. He extracts Deadpool to offer him a place on Earth-616 but Deadpool refuses and steals his TemPad to travel the multiverse in search of a Wolverine variant to prevent his world's destruction; he eventually brings a variant to the TVA, but Paradox labels him the "worst" Wolverine in the multiverse as he let down his entire world and prunes Deadpool and Wolverine, sending them to the Void. Paradox's plan is eventually exposed when his sleeper agent Pyro attempts to kill Nova, who then travels to Earth-10005 to capture Paradox and takes control of the Time Ripper to destroy all timelines except for the Void. After Deadpool and Wolverine destroy the Time Ripper, which also kills Nova, Paradox is arrested by his superior Hunter B-15.

=== Video games ===
The MCU version of the character appears in Marvel Snap (2022).
