= Time Variance Authority =

Fictional organization appearing in comic books published by Marvel Comics

- The Chronomonitors of the Time Variance Authority in the Halls of Chronometry being greeted by Mobius M. Mobius

Publication information
- Publisher: Marvel Comics
- First appearance: Thor #372 (October 1986)
- Created by: Walt Simonson; Sal Buscema

In-story information
- Type of organization: Bureaucracy; Criminal organization
- Base(s): Null-Time Zone
- Leader(s): Mr. Alternity; He Who Remains
- Agent(s): Mobius M. Mobius; Professor Justin Alphonse Gamble; Mr. Ouroboros; Mr. Paradox; Mr. Tesseract; Minutemen; Chronomonitors

The Time Variance Authority (TVA) is a fictional organization appearing in American comic books published by Marvel Comics. It is depicted as a group of timeline monitors tasked with preventing the existence of certain timelines that are deemed too dangerous to the Multiverse.

The TVA appears in the Marvel Cinematic Universe (MCU) Disney+ series Loki (2021–2023), as well as the films Deadpool & Wolverine (2024) and Avengers Endgame: Encore (2026).

== Publication history ==
The Time Variance Authority (TVA) first appeared in Thor #372 (October 1986). Created by Walt Simonson and Sal Buscema, the TVA originally paid homage to long-time Marvel writer/editor and continuity expert Mark Gruenwald: the TVA staff were all visually designed as clones of Gruenwald (the classification system for alternate realities — the Marvel multiverse — was devised, in part, by Gruenwald). Simonson had also taken inspiration for its initials from the Tennessee Valley Authority, a federally-owned electric utility company that his own father had worked alongside in his birthplace of Knoxville, Tennessee.

In July 2024, Marvel Comics announced the five-issue comic book series TVA, written by Loki season two writer Katharyn Blair with art by Pere Perez, to debut in December 2024. The series sees the comics' version of the TVA blended with the one established in the Marvel Cinematic Universe (MCU) along with the comics debut of some MCU characters. Blair called TVA her "comics interpretation" of the organization following Loki's sacrifice at the end of season two, calling the comic a "funny, in-between awesome space". The series features Mobius, O.B., Casey, B-15, and Miss Minutes from the series, along with comics characters who are stranded outside their timelines such as Jimmy Hudson, Captain Peggy Carter, a version of Gambit, and stranded Earth-65 resident Gwen Stacy.

=== Antecedents ===
==== Squadron Sinister/Squadron Supreme ====
Writer Roy Thomas and artist John Buscema had previously explored the concept of a Marvel multiverse with Marvel's evil Justice League correlates, called the Squadron Sinister, in Avengers #69 (1969). Thomas later introduced a heroic version of the Squadron Sinister named the Squadron Supreme, which first appeared in Avengers #85–86 (February–March 1971), and which was co-created with Buscema.

In 1985–1986, Mark Gruenwald wrote a deconstructionist multiverse storyline featuring the Squadron Supreme in a self-titled twelve-issue limited series.

==== Captain Britain and the Dimensional Development Court ====
The concept of a timeline monitoring organization had previously been explored in a Captain Britain story arc originally published in the Marvel UK series The Daredevils #6–8 (1983). Written by Alan Moore and Alan Davis, Captain Britain is brought outside of time to the Supreme Omniversal Tribunal in Eden Place to testify before Lord Mandragon, Majestrix of the Dimensional Development Court, on behalf of former majestrix Saturnyne. Saturnyne is accused of failing to protect the multiverse from the creation of a deviant version of Earth-238.

Before Captain Britain's testimony, Mandragon declares that Earth-238 must be "removed" from the multiverse before it destroys the continuums of the other universes. Saturnyn's legal counsel, a faceless being referred to as Lord Chancellor, objects, as the destruction of the Earth-238 universe will destroy material evidence of Saturnyne's innocence. Lord Mandragon overrules the defense's objection, citing Ominversal Writ clause 723-801-(d). He then proceeds to remove the dangerous deviant timestream using crystal technology.

It is revealed during the trial that the prime Earth that exists in Marvel Comics is Earth-616. Because of this story, Alan Moore is usually credited with naming the mainstream Marvel Universe "Earth-616." However, Alan Davis has said that it was invented by Dave Thorpe, the previous writer of the UK-published Captain Britain stories.

=== TVA as homage to Gruenwald and Captain Britain ===
While Captain Britain's 1983 story arc does not mention the Time Variance Authority, the Dimensional Development Court contains elements that were plainly retconned by Walt Simonson and Sal Buscema and in subsequent incarnations (such as the TVA employees—chronomonitors—functioning and appearing in new universes in the same manner as the Captain Britain Corps). According to Mark Gruenwald's widow Catherine, Gruenwald's 1985 Squadron Supreme limited series was the work about which he was the proudest.

== Fictional background ==
The TVA claims responsibility for monitoring the multiverse and can prune timelines if they are deemed too dangerous to exist. They also take action to prevent other beings from altering the past or future. They were first seen allowing Justice Peace, a lawman from the future, to travel to the 20th century in order to stop the killer Zaniac. Peace is able to succeed in his mission thanks to the assistance of Thor.

At the End of Time, the last director of the TVA, known as He Who Remains, creates the Time-Keepers, the last three beings who exist in the remaining timeline in the universe. The process also creates the Time Twisters, a trio of beings who imperiled all realities until they are stopped by the Avengers.

The TVA are next seen using the law-firm that She-Hulk works for. Jurors for cases are plucked from time soon before their death, minimizing the effects on the time stream. This also establishes the tendencies for time-travelers to go through genetic scrambling, also to minimize the effect on the time-stream. A defendant who is found guilty in one of these trials is executed with a weapon called the Retroactive Cannon, which erases them from history.

== Employees ==
Lower-ranked TVA employees, called Chronomonitors, are literally faceless. They are created artificially, using "quantum technology". The cloned managers of the Chronomonitors resemble longtime Marvel Comics writers Mark Gruenwald and Tom DeFalco. The most frequent recurring manager is Mobius M. Mobius, who resembles Gruenwald.

On occasion, the TVA hires mercenaries for use in more dangerous missions, such as Justice Peace and Death's Head. These mercenaries often lose limbs which the TVA replaces with clunky robotic parts. Another example of their seemingly anachronistic technology is a time machine shaped like an old locomotive. Professor Justin Alphonse Gamble, a pastiche of the Doctor, is a renegade from the TVA.

=== Known staff members ===
- Mr. Alternity – Upper management
- Professor Mr Mobius – A former employee, resigned and stole one of the time capsules
- Justice Mills – A member who appears briefly in a flashback.
- He Who Remains – The last survivor of the Time Variance Authority who is present at the end of time.
- Mobius Mr. Surender – A bureaucrat and middle management, attempted to discipline the Fantastic Four for violations of the TVA's laws.
- Mr. Oliver – A future clone of Mr. Paradox, ceased to exist when Clockwise used the Retro-Active Cannon on Paradox. A redesigned version of him based on the MCU version later appeared in the comics.
- Mr. Paradox – He ceased to exist when Clockwise blasted him with the Retro-Active Cannon.
- Mr. Pratheep (Senior Management) – A subordinate to Mobius, he was assigned to reconstruct lost data from Earth-616
- Time Zone Manager
- Time Variance Authority Police Department – A time police group that accompanied Justice Peace in effort to capture Godwulf.
- Justice Peace – A former freelance agent. He was punished for infractions of time travel. Currently a member of the Federal Police and Special Services Units in Brooklynopolis.
- Justice Might, Justice Truth, and Justice Liberty – Three time police officers who aided Mobius in recapturing the Fantastic Four while they were running loose inside the Null-Time Zone.
- Justice Love – A TVA agent and Justice Peace's partner. She appears to have legal training.
- Justice – A court officer. He ceased to exist when Clockwise blasted him with the Retro-Active Cannon.
- Time-Keepers – A group of beings created by He Who Remains to protect time.
- Minutemen – The armored agents of the TVA who are assigned to guard the TVA's facilities from the Null-Time Zone and extract disruptive entities from other time periods. Each of its members are either a clone, a cyborg, or a robot.

== In other media ==
=== Marvel Cinematic Universe ===
The logo of the Time Variance Authority as depicted in Loki

The Time Variance Authority appears in media set in the Marvel Cinematic Universe.

- The Time Variance Authority is introduced in Loki (2021). This version of the organization was created by He Who Remains, who sought to stop other variants of himself from coming into being to prevent a "multiversal war" among them that would have destroyed the multiverse. In building the TVA, he pulled variants of various people from across time, erased their memories, and built androids to serve as the Time-Keepers.
- The TVA appears in Deadpool & Wolverine (2024).

== See also ==
- Exiles (Marvel Comics)
- Linear Men
- Time Lords
