= Multiverse (Marvel Cinematic Universe) =

Marvel Cinematic Universe setting composed of alternate universes

- Marvel Cinematic Universe location

- Top: The MCU multiverse, depicted as a sprawling branch of various timelines, in the first-season finale of Loki (2021); Bottom: The MCU multiverse, now depicted in the form of a Yggdrasil-like tree, in the second-season finale of Loki (2023)
- First appearance: Doctor Strange (2016)
- Based on: Multiverse by Marvel Comics
- Adapted by: Jon Spaihts; Scott Derrickson; C. Robert Cargill
- Genre: Superhero fiction

In-universe information
- Type: Multiverse
- Locations: See below

The multiverse is a setting within the Marvel Cinematic Universe (MCU) media franchise. Based on the setting of the same name from the Marvel Comics, it is a collection of infinitely many alternate realities and dimensions. First explored in the film Doctor Strange (2016), it is revisited in the film Avengers: Endgame (2019) before playing a key role in Phases Four, Five, and Six of the MCU, which constitute "The Multiverse Saga". The MCU's multiverse centers on a universe sometimes referred to as the "Sacred Timeline", which also describes a bundle of closely aligned, infinite timelines that do not lead to the emergence of a Kang variant. Initially, branched timelines were generally "pruned" by the Time Variance Authority (TVA), until Sylvie kills the TVA's leader, "He Who Remains", allowing the multiverse to be freed and new branched timelines to fully form. Following this, the TVA, under new management, instead nurtures and observes these new universes. Some of those universes are considered separate from the "Sacred Timeline" but are still monitored by the TVA, such as Earth-10005 and Earth-828.

Many alternate versions of existing MCU and non-MCU Marvel characters have been introduced via the multiverse, most notably those of Loki, Kang the Conqueror, Spider-Man, Doctor Strange, Deadpool, and Wolverine. The main reality depicted in the MCU is designated Earth-616 beginning with the film Doctor Strange in the Multiverse of Madness (2022), despite its original designation as Earth-199999 by Marvel Comics and outside media. The multiverse has received a mixed response from critics, with praise for its visuals and nostalgic appeal but criticism of its excessive reliance on fan service. Characters from non-MCU Marvel films are featured in the films Spider-Man: No Way Home (2021) and Deadpool & Wolverine (2024), which has generated speculation and discussion among viewers and commentators.

== Concept and creation ==
The multiverse was first introduced to the Marvel Comics during the 1960s and 1970s. In Strange Tales #103 (1962), the character Johnny Storm of the Fantastic Four is teleported to an alternate reality for the first time in Marvel history, with the character sent to the Fifth Dimension. The concept of the multiverse was then fully explored in What If...? #1 (1977) and Marvel Two-in-One #50 (1979), with the term "multiverse" first used in the What If...? series. The main reality featured in the comics, Earth-616, was first named in The Daredevils #7 (1983) by Captain Britain creator David Thorpe to differentiate the character from his alternate versions.

In 2008, the film Iron Man was released, kickstarting the Marvel Cinematic Universe (MCU) media franchise. The setting of the franchise was subsequently designated Earth-199999 by Marvel Comics in the hardcover version of the Official Handbook of the Marvel Universe A-Z, Vol. 5 (2008). The characters Loki, Gwenpool, and Doctor Strange from the comics have been shown to be aware of the MCU's existence. The multiverse is introduced to the MCU in the film Doctor Strange (2016), with director Scott Derrickson noting that the character in the comics had previously "broke[n] open the Marvel comic book universe into the Marvel multiverse". At the time, producer and Marvel Studios president Kevin Feige stated that there were no plans to explore parallel universes similar to the ones featured in the comics, with the film instead exploring various "alien dimensions". It is later confirmed that the infinite dimensions of the multiverse explored in Doctor Strange are all contained within individual timelines.

The MCU multiverse is revisited in the film Avengers: Endgame (2019), in which the Avengers journey to four alternate timelines as part of a "Time Heist". The escape of an alternate version of Loki from an alternate 2012 New York sets up the first season of the Disney+ series Loki (2021). The multiverse plays a central role in Phase Four of the MCU, most notably in the first season of Loki, the first season of the Disney+ series What If...? (2021), the film Spider-Man: No Way Home (2021), and the film Doctor Strange in the Multiverse of Madness (2022). Phase Four, Phase Five, and Phase Six of the MCU will comprise "The Multiverse Saga".

The showrunners of Loki collaborated with the crews behind the Disney+ series WandaVision (2021), What If...?, and the film Ant-Man and the Wasp: Quantumania (2023), as all three projects are connected to the multiverse in some way. Together with WandaVision co-executive producer Mary Livanos and What If...? executive producer Brad Winderbaum, Loki executive producers Kevin Wright and Stephen Broussard developed a "rule book" regarding the MCU's multiverse and alternate timelines. Feige also held a meeting with Marvel Studios executives to discuss the rules of the multiverse and how they would present it to audiences.

With the release of The Marvel Cinematic Universe: An Official Timeline in October 2023, Feige wrote in its foreword that Marvel Studios only considered, at that time, projects developed by them in their first four phases as part of their "Sacred Timeline", but acknowledged the history of other Marvel films and television series that would exist in the larger multiverse given they were "canonical to Marvel". Additionally, he noted as Marvel Studios progressed in the Multiverse Saga, other outside timelines had the potential to "crash or converge" with the Sacred Timeline.

== Depictions ==
=== The Infinity Saga ===
==== Doctor Strange (2016) ====
In Doctor Strange, the term "multiverse" is used by the Masters of the Mystic Arts to describe the multitude of dimensions within the MCU. The character Ancient One brings Dr. Stephen Strange on a journey across the multiverse, passing by different universes and pocket realities, including the Quantum Realm introduced in the film Ant-Man (2015), the Mandelibus Dimension, the Actiniaria Dimension, the Flowering Incense Dimension, and the Grass Jelly Dimension. Internally referred to as the "Magical Mystery Tour" at Marvel Studios, the scene was originally seven minutes long. In an unrealized scene in the film Avengers: Infinity War (2018), Strange sends Thanos through a series of alternate universes, emulating the Magical Mystery Tour. The film most notably explores the Astral Dimension, the Dark Dimension, and the Mirror Dimension.

Astrophysicist Adam Frank was consulted on the depiction of the multiverse in Doctor Strange, offering guidance on how to portray the dimensions in a scientific manner. Frank stated that he did not believe the multiverse exists in real life, but viewed it as a "great idea to use for fiction". He added that the film's depiction did not need to be scientifically accurate as long as it "[drew] from the way scientists think about reality and think about space and dimensions".

Co-producer Richie Palmer of Doctor Strange in the Multiverse of Madness later confirmed in the film's artbook that the infinite realities referenced by the Ancient One exist nested within each universe and timeline.

==== Agents of S.H.I.E.L.D. season 5 (2017–2018) ====
The bulk of the fifth season of the ABC series Agents of S.H.I.E.L.D. (2017–2018) is set in an alternate future, around the time of Infinity War, where Earth has been destroyed. The protagonist team of S.H.I.E.L.D. agents return to the present day at the end of the season.

==== Avengers: Endgame (2019) ====
In Endgame, the Avengers travel through the Quantum Realm to 1970 Camp Lehigh, 2012 New York, 2013 Asgard, and 2014 Morag and Vormir, to retrieve the six Infinity Stones displaced through time. The events of The Avengers (2012), Thor: The Dark World (2013), and Guardians of the Galaxy (2014) are revisited in the film. The film establishes the rules of time travel in the MCU, rejecting the grandfather paradox and the butterfly effect which state that changes to the past will affect the future in the same timeline. Instead, the film stipulates that when the past or future is changed, it diverges from the main timeline into an alternate one, effectively creating a parallel universe.

When Tony Stark / Iron Man and Scott Lang / Ant-Man attempt to acquire the Tesseract from 2012 New York, an alternate version of Loki escapes with the Tesseract. Alternate versions of Thanos, Gamora, and Nebula teleport from 2014 to the Avengers Compound in the present-day, leading to a battle between the Avengers and Thanos. Afterward, Steve Rogers / Captain America returns the Infinity Stones and Mjölnir to their original timelines, choosing to stay behind with an alternate version of Peggy Carter in 1949 and grow old with her. The directors and screenwriter of the film disagree on whether this was done in an alternate reality through time travel, or in the past in the main timeline.

==== Spider-Man: Far From Home (2019) ====
In the film Spider-Man: Far From Home (2019), Quentin Beck / Mysterio claims to Peter Parker / Spider-Man that he and the Elementals are from an alternate reality in the multiverse named Earth-833, calling the main universe depicted in the MCU Earth-616. This is later revealed to be a ruse devised by Beck and his crew to gain revenge on Stark, their former employer. J. K. Simmons appears in a mid-credits scene as J. Jonah Jameson; he had previously portrayed the character in Raimi's Spider-Man trilogy, but director Jon Watts clarified that the character was a new incarnation and not "from another dimension or multiverse". Despite this, Feige confirmed that a multiverse indeed existed in the MCU.

==== Agents of S.H.I.E.L.D. season 7 (2020) ====
In the seventh season of Agents of S.H.I.E.L.D. (2020), the S.H.I.E.L.D. team pursues the Chronicoms across time through "tides". The early episodes of the season appeared to contradict the time-travel rules established by Endgame, though it is later revealed that a new timeline was created as a result of the S.H.I.E.L.D. team altering events in the past, in line with Endgame's depiction of time-travel. The series finale, "What We're Fighting For", confirms that the events of the season had been taking place in a branched timeline, with Leo Fitz leading the team back to the series' main timeline through the Quantum Realm.

=== The Multiverse Saga ===
==== Loki season 1 (2021) ====
The concept of the multiverse is explored in depth for the first time in the first season of Loki, which kicks off a multiverse-centric story arc in the MCU. The version of Loki who had escaped from 2012 New York during the events of Endgame is captured by the Time Variance Authority (TVA), an otherworldly organization which monitors the multiverse. The series designates the main reality depicted in the MCU as the Sacred Timeline, with the TVA striving to maintain this flow of time in all universes by "pruning" alternate timelines that have significantly deviated from the Sacred Timeline, using reset charges. Loki, who is labeled a "variant" by the TVA, is recruited by Mobius M. Mobius to hunt down Sylvie, another alternate version of himself who has been ambushing TVA Minutemen in alternate timelines. After a skirmish at a 2050 Roxxon supermarket, the duo are forced to work together to escape 2077 Lamentis-1, a moon destined to be destroyed in an alternate timeline.

Additional variants of Loki are introduced in the Void, a barren dimension at the end of time where individuals and objects are sent to after being pruned by the TVA. These include the elderly Classic Loki, the adolescent Kid Loki, the hammer-wielding Boastful Loki, and the reptilian Alligator Loki. In the season finale, "For All Time. Always.", Loki and Sylvie meet He Who Remains, a mysterious figure from the 31st century who ended a multiversal war between variants of himself before establishing the TVA. He is murdered by Sylvie, allowing universes to diverge from the Sacred Timeline and in turn leading to the recreation of the multiverse. In the episode's final moments, Loki is transported to the TVA's past, where he meets an oblivious Mobius and sees a statue of He Who Remains. This episode sets up the events of Multiverse of Madness, No Way Home, and Quantumania.

According to head writer Michael Waldron, the time travel rules established by Endgame are elaborated upon in the series, describing the Sacred Timeline, term often also used to refer to the main MCU timeline, as an overlapping cluster of intertwined timelines occurring at the same time. He says that countless nearly-identical instances of time coexist, and says that infinite instances of time always occur at once, where any given moment actually has many virtually identical counterparts, even referring to these as "different universe… different timelines" that are practically the same, since they all follow the same baseline: they all lead to the birth of He Who Remains.

The TVA uses a barometer to determine what constitutes a meaningful deviation that could result in the birth of a Kang variant. Small fluctuations occur constantly but are allowed to exist as long as they don't exceed the threshold of significant deviation. When this happens, the timeline splits from its parent macro-timeline, composed of countless nearly identical timelines, and forms its own branched timeline. The Sacred Timeline is depicted as a circular shape when viewed from the Citadel at the End of Time, a concept conceived by the series' storyboard artists and thought by director Kate Herron to be a "striking image". Early concepts for the series included several other time periods which were ultimately not visited in the season. Feige has stated that the events of Loki would leave a significant lasting impact on the MCU, with Waldron adding that the series would have "wide-reaching ramifications" across the franchise. Director Kate Herron compared the Sacred Timeline to a tree or an island. He Who Remains effectively took this tree and isolated it from the others, like an island hidden from the rest, by pruning all the branch timelines that connected the larger Multiverse to the Sacred Timeline. When the Sacred Timeline began branching freely, its branches started reconnecting to the other larger timelines, essentially other trees in the Multiverse.

==== What If...? season 1 (2021) ====
The first season of What If...? explores numerous alternate realities that have deviated from the Sacred Timeline. The series is narrated by the Watcher, an almighty being who observes the multiverse without interfering. The alternate realities featured in the season include one where Carter becomes the super-soldier Captain Carter, one where T'Challa becomes Star-Lord, one where the Avengers are assassinated by Hank Pym / Yellowjacket during the events of the tie-in comic Fury's Big Week (2012), one where Stephen Strange is corrupted by dark magic, one where Janet van Dyne / Wasp triggers a zombie apocalypse, one where Erik "Killmonger" Stevens rescues Stark before causing a war between Wakanda and the U.S., one where Thor was an only child and lives a party lifestyle, and one where Ultron uses the Infinity Stones to exterminate all life in the universe.

The Watcher refuses to intervene when the corrupted Strange pleads with him to save his collapsing universe, citing his oath not to do so. After failing to defeat the Infinity Stones-wielding Ultron, the Watcher breaks his oath and recruits six multiversal heroes to the Guardians of the Multiverse in an effort to save the multiverse. Head writer A. C. Bradley was uncertain of how Loki and Multiverse of Madness would depict the multiverse, as production on What If..? began well before those two projects did, thus deciding to leave most of the MCU's multiversal "rules-building" to the crews behind Loki and Multiverse of Madness.

==== Spider-Man: No Way Home (2021) ====
No Way Home connects the MCU to Sony Pictures' other Spider-Man films, with multiple characters from alternate realities accidentally transported to the main timeline due to a miscast spell performed by Strange intended to erase the world's knowledge of Parker's identity as Spider-Man. Tobey Maguire, Alfred Molina, Willem Dafoe, and Thomas Haden Church reprise their roles as Peter Parker / Spider-Man, Otto Octavius / Doctor Octopus, Norman Osborn / Green Goblin, and Flint Marko / Sandman, respectively, from Sam Raimi's Spider-Man trilogy; Andrew Garfield, Jamie Foxx, and Rhys Ifans reprise their roles as Peter Parker / Spider-Man, Max Dillon / Electro, and Curt Connors / Lizard, respectively, from Marc Webb's The Amazing Spider-Man films; while Tom Hardy reprises his roles as Eddie Brock and Venom from Sony's Spider-Man Universe (SSU). Many of these actors arrived on sets wearing cloaks to avoid leaks of their involvement.

In the film, Parker refuses to send Octavius, Osborn, Marko, Dillon, and Connors to their deadly fates in their original realities, trapping Strange in the Mirror Dimension. After all but Octavius go rogue, Parker is joined by his alternate counterparts, dubbed "Peter-Two" (Maguire) and "Peter-Three" (Garfield), in developing cures for the multiversal villains. During a battle in front of the Statue of Liberty, the destruction of Strange's Macchina di Kadavus begins to tear the fabric of reality, forcing Strange to erase the world's memories of Parker before sending the multiversal characters back to their own universes. Screenwriters Chris McKenna and Erik Sommers began exploring the idea of the multiverse and potentially revisiting characters from past Spider-Man films early on during the writing process, initially planning for this to be a minor tease for fans. Early drafts had featured virtually every major character from previous Spider-Man films, but this was eventually narrowed down to avoid excessive fan service. Almost all of the multiversal villains were redesigned at some level for the film: Osborn and Dillon were given more comics-accurate appearances, while Molina and Dafoe were both digitally de-aged.

==== Doctor Strange in the Multiverse of Madness (2022) ====
The plot of Multiverse of Madness revolves entirely around the multiverse. The film introduces the character America Chavez, a teenager from the Utopian Parallel who can teleport between universes through star-shaped portals. In the opening of the film, Chavez and an alternate version of Strange from Earth-617 battle a demon in the Gap Junction, a space between universes, before Chavez escapes to Earth-616, the main MCU universe. The attire worn by this Strange was modeled after Matt Fraction's Defenders (2011) comic book series. Chavez and Strange are later seen crashing through 20 different universes, which include a world inhabited by statues resembling the Marvel Comics character Living Tribunal, an animated world with a comic-book style appearance, a destroyed New York City in the aftermath of an alternate Battle of New York during The Avengers, a world composed of Stark Industries combat drones from Far From Home, the dinosaur-inhabited Savage Land from the comics, and a black-and-white New York City stuck in the 1930s after being taken over by Hydra. Visual effects for the 40-second-long sequence were provided by Framestore, which initiated development nearly a year and a half before the film's release. The company refers to the sequence as the "America Portal Ride", with head animator Alexis Wajsbrot seeking to "echo the craziness" of Doctor Strange's Magical Mystery Tour. Other references in the sequence include homages to the work of M. C. Escher, Salvador Dalí, and Pablo Picasso.

The duo is subsequently captured by the Illuminati, a secret society of superhumans, in Earth-838. The group includes Karl Mordo, Captain Carter, Blackagar Boltagon / Black Bolt, Maria Rambeau / Captain Marvel, Reed Richards, and Professor Charles Xavier, who are portrayed by Chiwetel Ejiofor, Hayley Atwell, Anson Mount, Lashana Lynch, John Krasinski, and Patrick Stewart, respectively. Ejiofor, Atwell, Lynch, and Mount all reprise their roles from prior MCU media, while Stewart reprises his role from 20th Century Fox's X-Men film series. However, they all play alternate versions of their characters separate from their original roles. Mount dons a more comics-accurate costume than his appearance in the ABC series Inhumans (2017), while Lynch was surprised when she learned she would be playing an alternate version of Rambeau, initially believing she would be portraying an ancestor of Rambeau. Feige cast Krasinski in the role because he was a highly popular suggestion for the role from fans, with his appearance replacing a planned cameo appearance by Daniel Craig as Balder the Brave. Stewart uses a yellow wheelchair akin to the one seen in X-Men: The Animated Series (1992–1997) and utters a line from X-Men: Days of Future Past (2014). Waldron, who wrote this film's script, was unable to include Namor as part of the Illuminati because Marvel Studios had other plans for him; the character would later appear in the film Black Panther: Wakanda Forever (2022). Obadiah Stane / Iron Monger was considered to appear as a member of the Illuminati.

Also appearing in the film is a version of Strange who has been corrupted by the Darkhold and has a third eye. The main MCU reality is designated Earth-616 by an alternate version of Christine Palmer from Earth-838, a scientist working for the Baxter Foundation. According to actress Rachel McAdams, Palmer's role as a "multiversal expert" allowed her to have more action sequences than in the first film, and her interactions with Earth-616's Strange helped resolve the love story between him and Earth-616's Palmer. Early versions of the film had featured another alternate version of Palmer as well as Earth-838 versions of Michael Stuhlbarg's Nicodemus West and Evangeline Lilly's Hope van Dyne / Wasp, but these were cut. The alternate version of Palmer cut from the film came from an alternate universe where she fought off against ghosts and demons, but director Sam Raimi was forced to remove the sequence during reshoots. Tom Hiddleston was reported to return as Loki, but was absent from the final film. The film introduces several multiverse-related concepts to the MCU. Early on in the film, dreams are revealed to be visions of one's alternate counterparts in the multiverse. Maximoff and Strange later engage in "dreamwalking", a "mentally [and] physically exhausting spell" in which one possesses one's multiversal counterpart using the Darkhold. Additionally, "incursions" are established as universe-ending events that occur when one leaves a large footprint in an alternate reality, causing the connection between both universes to destabilize and resulting in the destruction of one or both of the universes.

The film's focus on the multiverse was revealed at the 2019 San Diego Comic-Con (SDCC), with the announcement of the film's title and release date. Explaining the subtitle Multiverse of Madness, co-producer Richie Palmer stated that the film would explore the definitions of the word "madness" as well as inner demons, while Feige stated his intention to explore the "mind-bending frightening side" of the multiverse. The cast found it difficult to keep track of the different realities of the multiverse. Waldron also sought to avoid excessive fan service, and had to "move fast" regarding the multiverse due to Multiverse of Madness being a film and not a television series. Feeling that his work on the series Rick and Morty (2013–present) had prepared him with introducing concepts like the multiverse, he added that Multiverse of Madness' depiction of the multiverse differed from the aforementioned series in that the alternate realities were not solely played for laughs, instead viewing the multiverse as the emotional centerpiece of the film. Waldron chose to write Wanda Maximoff / Scarlet Witch as the film's antagonist instead of a multiverse-related villain such as Kang because he did not want the film to be "overstuffed", and decided to introduce the Illuminati so the film could "find the madness in the multiverse". As Multiverse of Madness was originally intended to be released before No Way Home, Waldron worked with McKenna and Sommers to adjust the plot of the film accordingly after Multiverse of Madness was delayed. Feige described the multiverse as "the next step in the evolution of the MCU", noting that this film would also have significant repercussions on the MCU.

==== Ant-Man and the Wasp: Quantumania (2023) ====
Kang appears in Quantumania, serving as the film's primary antagonist. In the film, he is revealed to have instigated the multiversal war mentioned in Loki, subjugating and destroying entire timelines. Kang's variants, known collectively as the "Council of Kangs", banish him to the Quantum Realm out of fear, and Kang plots his revenge. In the Quantum Realm, he enlists the help of Janet to rebuild the power core of his spaceship, which allows him to travel the multiverse, but Janet rebels upon learning of his past. Using Pym Particles, Janet enlarges the core, rendering it unusable. Decades later, Kang has established an "empire" in the Quantum Realm, terrorizing its inhabitants. He coerces Lang to retrieve the core and restore it to its original size, but Janet intervenes and a battle ensues. Lang and his allies eventually defeat Kang by destroying the core, which distorts and then engulfs him.

The film's mid-credits scene introduces three variants of Kang: Immortus, Rama-Tut, and Centurion, who convene the Council upon learning of Kang's apparent death and plan their multiversal uprising against Earth-616. In the film's post-credits scene, Loki and Mobius encounter yet another variant of Kang, Victor Timely, in 1893. This scene sets up the second season of Loki. Two of Hope's sons from an alternate universe were originally intended to appear, but were cut. According to Jonathan Majors, who portrays Kang, the character is a "Nexus Being" who can affect the stability of the multiverse. Screenwriter Jeff Loveness said that since the concept of time travel had already been explored in Endgame, he sought to place greater emphasis on Kang's connections to the multiverse and "evolve" the MCU's multiversal storytelling. He also described the Quantum Realm as a "connected limbo outside of space and time", likening it to the "basement" of the multiverse. Director Peyton Reed stated that Kang's arrival to the MCU would have major implications for the MCU going forward.

==== Loki season 2 (2023) ====
Victor Timely, a variant of Kang, appears in the second season of Loki. He is recruited by Loki and members of the TVA to help stabilize the Temporal Loom, a device that refines raw time into physical timeline strands. After several futile attempts to stop the Loom from overloading, Loki uses his burgeoning time-slipping ability to return to the Citadel at the End of Time, where He Who Remains resided in season 1. When Loki confronts He Who Remains in the moments before Sylvie had killed him, He Who Remains explains that the Loom was in fact a failsafe designed to preserve the Sacred Timeline in the event that the timeline branches grew beyond the control of the TVA. He presents to Loki two choices: either let the Loom run its course of eradicating everything but the Sacred Timeline, or eliminate the Loom and thus let all timelines die. After much consideration, Loki sacrifices himself by using his powers to destroy the Loom, revive the dying timeline strands, and reform them into a tree-like structure, seating himself at its center in the Citadel ruins to manage the tree in perpetuity.

==== What If...? season 2 (2023) ====
The second season of What If...? continued to chronicle the activities of the Watcher, exploring new alternate realities in the multiverse. Some of the storyline elements from the first season with Captain Carter, Doctor Strange Supreme, and the Watcher are continued in this season. The sixth episode introduces an original MCU character named Kahhori, a young Mohawk woman in an alternate timeline who seeks to discover her new-found powers after the Tesseract crash-lands in the Haudenosaunee Confederacy in pre-colonial America where European colonization has not occurred.

The season's final episode includes the multiverse tree established in the Loki season two finale, and also sees Doctor Strange Supreme capturing various "universe-killers" to atone for his past sins. Strange asks Carter to assist with capturing an escaped variant, who fled to a universe where Hydra used the Tesseract to destroy the world. Carter agrees, in spite of the Watcher's warning. She encounters Kahhori, who reveals that Strange had actually been capturing both heroes and villains from various universes to feed to the Forge, a contraption he created to resurrect his own universe, which he indirectly destroyed trying to avert Christine Palmer's death. As Strange attempts to kill Kahhori, Carter frees the imprisoned variants in the Sanctum, allowing her and Kahhori to escape from Strange. They run into Black Panther Killmonger, but Kahhori teleports him out of his Infinity Armor, allowing Carter to use it. Carter and Kahhori confront Strange at the Forge, where the latter begins feeding the variants to it. Carter is assisted by the variants who lend their weapons to her aid, while Strange is slowly taken over by his demonic self. Eventually, Carter manages to separate Strange from his demonic counterpart. As the Forge begins to collapse, Strange sacrifices both him and his demonic self to the Forge. The Watcher teleports Kahhori back to her universe and takes Carter to his dimension, where he reveals that Strange's universe had been restored, though Strange himself would never be born into it. Carter asks the Watcher to show her the multiverse before taking her home.

==== The Marvels (2023) ====
The Marvels briefly introduces at the end of the film a universe where the X-Men appear to have a prominent role. The Kree villain Dar-Benn opens a portal to an adjacent reality to Earth-616, where Monica Rambeau gets trapped at the end of the film in order to close the rift. She awakens inside the X-Mansion, and is greeted by two of its inhabitants, Maria Rambeau, taking the code name of Binary instead, and one of the X-Men, the mutant Dr. Hank McCoy / Beast, who also mentions Professor Charles Xavier by name. McCoy is portrayed by Kelsey Grammer, reprising his role from 20th Century Fox's X-Men films X-Men: The Last Stand (2006) and X-Men: Days of Future Past (2014).

==== Deadpool & Wolverine (2024) ====
The film Deadpool & Wolverine features the character Wade Wilson / Deadpool from the X-Men films Deadpool (2016) and Deadpool 2 (2018) produced by Fox, with Ryan Reynolds reprising the role. Most of the film takes place on Earth-10005 and the Void, while the TVA and Alioth from Loki also appear. Writer Rhett Reese described the film as a fish out of water story for Deadpool, as he is a lunatic who will be dropped into the "very sane world" of the MCU. Feige has described that Wilson will discover the Sacred Timeline in the film and find it fascinating, but he will realize that Paradox's plans may not be what they seem and he will learn that his offer isn't as simple and there are "universe sized" stakes on the way.

The film also includes several characters from 20th Century Fox's X-Men films and other Marvel productions, including Hugh Jackman reprising his role as an alternate version of Wolverine, Aaron Stanford as Pyro from X2 (2003) and X-Men: The Last Stand (2006), Tyler Mane as Sabretooth from X-Men (2000), Dafne Keen as X-23 from Logan (2017), Jennifer Garner as Elektra from Daredevil (2003) and Elektra (2005), Chris Evans (who portrayed Captain America in the MCU) as the Human Torch from Fantastic Four (2005) and Fantastic Four: Rise of the Silver Surfer (2007), and Wesley Snipes as Blade from New Line Cinema's Blade film trilogy (1998–2004). Additionally, Channing Tatum portrays Gambit as a reference to an unproduced Gambit film where Tatum was set to star as the character before its cancellation due to Fox's acquisition by Disney. Keen and Stanford confirmed their roles to not be variants of Laura and Pyro respectively but the same ones they portrayed in the X-Men film series, with the backstory provided by Reynolds and director Shawn Levy being that they were pruned by the TVA some years after their last appearances instead of being taken from specific points of certain timelines. Wolverine comes from a reality where all his fellow X-Men died, while the rest of those characters appear as inhabitants of the Void, with Pyro and Sabretooth working for Cassandra Nova (Emma Corrin), while Laura, Elektra, Blade, the Human Torch, and Gambit oppose her as resistance members which previously included Daredevil, Magneto, the Punisher, and Quicksilver. Other characters who work for Cassandra are the Juggernaut (Aaron W. Reed), Blob (Mike Waters), Azazel (Eduardo Gago Muñoz), Callisto (Chloe Kibble), Lady Deathstrike (Jade Lye), Psylocke (Ayesha Hussain), Arclight (Jessica Walker), and Toad (Daniel Medina Ramos), all portrayed by stunt performers over their original X-Men film series actors, as well as the Russian (Billy Clements) and Bullseye (Curtis Rowland Small). To decide which characters from the 20th Century Fox era of Marvel films would return, Levy and the filmmakers contacted the dozens of actors displayed at the film's Fox tribute reel during the credits, including ones that ultimately didn't return like Ben Affleck as Daredevil or Vinnie Jones as Juggernaut, while prioritizing the movie to be emotional and poignant over "going crazy" with the Multiverse and taking the audience's "eye off the balls" that count most, noting some of the characters depicted in the film were since its earliest drafts whereas others "evolved" over months into pre-production.

Several Deadpool variants from the Void also appear, such as Nicepool (also portrayed by Reynolds), Dogpool (portrayed by dog actor Peggy), Ladypool (voiced by Blake Lively), Headpool (voiced by Nathan Fillion), Cowboypool (Matthew McConaughey), among others. Seven other versions of Wolverine briefly appear, with six also portrayed by Jackman while one, dubbed "The Cavillrine", is portrayed by Henry Cavill. One of those variants appears fighting the Hulk.

==== Captain America: Brave New World (2025) ====
In the post-credit scene, Sam Wilson visits an incarcerated Samuel Sterns at the Raft. Sterns tells Wilson about the multiverse, warning him that there are other worlds besides theirs and that he will need to protect their universe from being attacked by others.

==== The Fantastic Four: First Steps (2025) ====
The entirety of the film The Fantastic Four: First Steps is set on Earth-828, a 1960s-inspired retro-futuristic Earth separate from the main MCU. In this universe, the Fantastic Four came about after an accident in 1960 that gave them superpowers and thus becoming the Fantastic Four. A Fantastic Four spaceship arrives in Earth-616 at some point after the events of First Steps and during the post-credit scene of Thunderbolts* (2025). The cosmic being known as Galactus comes from a period before the current iteration of Earth-828. The number 828 is inspired by co-creator Jack Kirby's birthday of August 28, 1917.

==== Marvel Zombies (2025) ====
The storyline of the episode "What If... Zombies?!" from the first season of What If...? was continued in the Disney+ series Marvel Zombies (2025). The series depicts a group of survivors discovering the key to bring an end to the zombie plague, which leads them to risk their lives traveling across a dystopian landscape and fighting superpowered zombies to save the world.

Additional survivors appearing in the series include Kamala Khan, Riri Williams, Kate Bishop, Blade Knight, Yelena Belova, Alexei Shostakov, Shang-Chi, Katy Chen, Jimmy Woo, Death Dealer, and Valkyrie. Survivors also returning from the storyline of "What If... Zombies?!" include Peter Parker, Scott Lang, T'Challa, and Bruce Banner who is revealed to have survived and is contained by the energy of the Infinity Stones becoming Infinity Hulk. Wanda Maximoff is depicted as the queen of the dead who is turned into a zombie.

== Notable universes ==
=== Primary ===
These universes have been officially designated in their respective films and serve as a central component to that film's plot.

Official reality designation	Brief description	First appearance
===== Earth-616 ===== Earth-616 ("Sacred Timeline")	Main article: Marvel Cinematic Universe timeline: The main continuity for the MCU, including the films, One-Shots, tie-in comics and all of the Disney+ series (excluding What If...? and Loki); also known as the "Sacred Timeline"; Despite having been designated as Earth-199999 by Marvel Comics in 2008 in a handbook, Multiverse of Madness establishes the MCU as Earth-616, sharing the name with the primary setting of the comics. Marvel Studios executive Nate Moore previously referred to the main MCU universe as Earth-616 in November 2021, and Feige also began using the term internally prior to the release of Multiverse of Madness. In addition to Beck's use of the term in Far From Home, a reference to the "616 universe" can be seen on Erik Selvig's blackboard in The Dark World.	Iron Man (2008)
===== Earth-10005 ===== Earth-10005	See also: X-Men (film series): Wade Wilson / Deadpool's home reality and the setting of 20th Century Fox's X-Men film series.; As the universe begins to disintegrate following the death of its "anchor being" James "Logan" Howlett / Wolverine in Logan (2017), the Time Variance Authority (TVA) take in Deadpool and show him the history of the MCU, shown via archive recordings of past MCU films. Additionally, Laura / X-23, portrayed by Dafne Keen who reprises her role from Logan, is revealed both in-film and by Keen herself to be the same version, having aged several years past the events of Logan before being pruned by the TVA into the Void and eventually become part of the Resistance group.; An alternate version of Wolverine eventually returns with Deadpool and, after defeating Cassandra Nova and regenerating the timeline, becomes its new "anchor being", remaining on Earth-10005.; By 2028, in Avengers: Doomsday (2026), Earth-10005 is attempting to prevent an incursion with Earth-1127 by using missiles.	Deadpool & Wolverine (2024) (Note: Although first depicted in X-Men (2000), Earth-10005 is first officially referenced in the MCU in Deadpool & Wolverine.)
===== Earth-828 ===== Earth-828	The home reality of the Fantastic Four and Victor von Doom / Doctor Doom. This Earth is a 1960s-inspired retro-futuristic setting, technology is vastly different, and the Fantastic Four are the only known superheroes within this universe.; The designation 828 is derived from Jack Kirby's birthday, August 28.	The Fantastic Four: First Steps (2025)

=== Others ===
Universe	Brief description	First appearance
Earth-617	Reality where a variant of Stephen Strange known as "Defender Strange" originates from, according to director Sam Raimi on the audio commentary for Multiverse of Madness.	N/A
Earth-838	The home to the Illuminati, a secret society founded by an alternate version of Strange.; After causing an "incursion" of another reality as a byproduct of using the Darkhold to defeat Thanos, Strange is executed by Boltagon on Titan, and he is succeeded by Mordo as one of the members of the Illuminati.; The Illuminati was formed in the wake of the Ultron program's success by Stark and the Avengers' subsequent retirement.; Other notable inhabitants of Earth-838 include Palmer, Maximoff, her children Billy and Tommy, and various Ultron sentries. The Ultron sentries are voiced by Ross Marquand, returning from What If...? in which he replaced James Spader voicing Ultron from the film Avengers: Age of Ultron (2015).; This reality also exists under an authoritarian police state rule, as revealed by screenwriter Michael Waldron.	Doctor Strange in the Multiverse of Madness (2022)
Earth-1127	Universe which is shown on the TVA's monitor to be engaging in warfare with Earth-10005 to prevent an incursion.	Avengers Endgame: Encore (2026) (Note: The re-release of Avengers: Endgame.)
Earth-7355	Seen on a TVA monitor suffering an incursion with Earth-8558.	Avengers Endgame: Encore (2026)
Earth-8558	Seen on a TVA monitor suffering an incursion with Earth-7355.	Avengers Endgame: Encore (2026)
Unnamed Earth ("Raimi-verse")	Setting of the Sam Raimi Spider-Man trilogy (2002–2007).; While this universe is not shown on-screen, No Way Home features characters from Raimi's Spider-Man film series, with many actors reprising their roles from the trilogy.; The version of Parker from this universe, dubbed "Peter-Two", uses organic webbing instead of web shooters like his alternate counterparts, and maintains a complicated relationship with love interest Mary Jane Watson. Three of Parker's villains, which include Osborn, Octavius, and Marko, are transported to Earth-616 as well.; The official script for No Way Home refers to Parker's universe as being dubbed the "Raimi-verse".	N/A (Note: These universes, while mentioned in No Way Home, do not appear on-screen within the MCU, despite appearing in their respective franchises.)
Unnamed Earth ("Webb-verse")	Setting of the Marc Webb The Amazing Spider-Man duology (2012–2014); While also not depicted on screen, No Way Home also features characters from Marc Webb's The Amazing Spider-Man film series, with many actors reprising their roles from the duology.; While also not depicted on screen, the version of Parker from this universe, dubbed "Peter-Three", reels from the death of girlfriend Gwen Stacy in the film The Amazing Spider-Man 2 (2014), holding himself responsible for his failure to save her, even becoming violent and rageful as a result in the years following her death. Two of Parker's villains, which include Connors and Dillon, are transported to Earth-616 as well.; The official script for No Way Home refers to Parker's universe as being dubbed the "Webb-verse".	N/A
Unnamed Earth	Home universe of the "yellow suit" version of Hugh Jackman's Logan / Wolverine that appears in Deadpool & Wolverine.; This universe's X-Men were killed by mutant-hunting humans, when Logan was out getting drunk. He later wears a comic-accurate suit in their memory.	Deadpool & Wolverine (2024)
Unnamed Earth	Setting for the Fox-produced films Fantastic Four (2005) and Fantastic Four: Rise of the Silver Surfer (2007).; Deadpool & Wolverine has Chris Evans reprise his role as Johnny Storm / Human Torch, pruned from his home reality, which the film heavily implies is the same character.; In the film, Storm has been stuck within the Void and is part of the Resistance group against Cassandra Nova. He references his universe's version of Reed Richards / Mister Fantastic (portrayed by Ioan Gruffudd) saying that he studied the multiverse sometime after the events of Rise of the Silver Surfer.	N/A (Note: These universes, while mentioned in Deadpool & Wolverine, do not appear on-screen within the MCU, despite appearing in their respective franchises.)
Unnamed Earth	Setting for the Fox-produced films Daredevil (2003) and Elektra (2005).; Elektra Natchios, portrayed by Jennifer Garner, also reprises her role in Deadpool & Wolverine as a Resistance member in the Void. She and Matt Murdock / Daredevil, portrayed by Ben Affleck, were both pruned by the TVA from their universe into the Void sometime after the events of Elektra, and Murdock eventually was killed by Cassandra Nova sometime prior to the events of Deadpool & Wolverine.	N/A
Unnamed Earth	Setting of the Blade film trilogy produced by New Line Cinema; Wesley Snipes reprises his role as Eric Brooks as a member of the Resistance group in Deadpool & Wolverine. Like the other Resistance fighters, he was pruned from his universe by the TVA and sent to the Void sometime after the events of Blade: Trinity and Blade: The Series.	N/A

== Timeline branches ==
These universes are mainly branches of Earth-616 caused by events differing from those shown in the MCU in Avengers: Endgame and What If...? (2021–2024).

=== Time Heist ===
Portrayed in Avengers: Endgame, these branched universes were created as a result of the Avengers' Time Heist to reacquire the Infinity Stones. Because Judge Ravonna Renslayer stated that the Earth-616 Avengers were meant to time travel, it implies that the timelines they created did not diverge significantly from the baseline, as the end of Time Heist saw the return of each Infinity Stone to their correct place in the timeline soon enough to prevent new timelines from being created. If not, the TVA presumably would simply prune them afterwards.

==== 2012 branch ====
Tony Stark, Steve Rogers, Bruce Banner, and Scott Lang time-travel to New York City in an alternate 2012 during the Battle of New York. While Banner implores the Ancient One to relinquish the Time Stone, Rogers intercepts a S.T.R.I.K.E. team and acquires Loki's scepter containing the Mind Stone. Stark and Lang attempt to thieve the Tesseract from Stark's alternate counterpart, but the plan goes awry and Loki escapes with the Tesseract. In Loki, this reality is "reset" by the TVA and the alternate Loki is arrested.

==== 2014 branch ====
During the Avengers' Time Heist in Endgame, Natasha Romanoff / Black Widow, Clint Barton / Hawkeye, James Rhodes / War Machine, and Nebula time-travel to an alternate Morag in 2014. Romanoff and Barton depart on the Benatar to Vormir to acquire the Soul Stone, in which Romanoff sacrifices herself. Meanwhile, Rhodes and Nebula successfully acquire the Orb containing the Power Stone, but Nebula is captured by the 2014-Thanos. Later, after reverse-engineering the Pym particles acquired from Nebula, 2014-Thanos and his warship, the Sanctuary II, are teleported to the Avengers Compound in 2023, leading to a major battle between Thanos' forces and the Avengers, Guardians of the Galaxy, Masters of the Mystic Arts, Wakandans, Asgardians, and Ravagers. An alternate version of Gamora from 2014 betrays Thanos and joins 2023 Nebula, later disappearing from the battlefield. She returned in the film Guardians of the Galaxy Vol. 3 (2023).

=== Zombie apocalypse ===
In a reality first explored in "What If... Zombies?!", Pym rescues Janet from the Quantum Realm as he did in the film Ant-Man and the Wasp (2018), only to discover that Janet has been infected with a quantum virus which transformed her into a zombie. This leads to a zombie apocalypse, with many Avengers and their allies turned into zombies, including Stark, Strange, Wong, Barton, Happy Hogan, Sam Wilson / Falcon, Sharon Carter / Agent 13, Rogers, and Maximoff. This reality is revisited in Marvel Zombies, in which additional characters are revealed to have transformed into zombies, including Emil Blonsky / Abomination, Ava Starr / Ghost, Carol Danvers / Captain Marvel, Okoye, while Ikaris, immune, fights endlessly to keep Captain Marvel from infecting outer space.

=== Ultron's conquest ===
The episode "What If... Ultron Won?" of the first season of What If...? is centered on an alternate universe where Ultron transfers his consciousness into the Vision's body, acquires the Infinity Stones from Thanos, and wipes out all life in the universe. This leads into the first-season finale, "What If... the Watcher Broke His Oath?", in which the Watcher assembles six multiversal characters from the previous episodes to the Guardians of the Multiverse, and Ultron is defeated. The animators used an artistic effect called the Kirby Krackle in these two episodes to demonstrate the multiversal power of Ultron and the Watcher, which Bradley was adamant on including due to it never having been used before in the MCU.

== Reception ==
=== Critical response ===
The Magical Mystery Tour sequence in Doctor Strange was praised by critics, with Umberto Gonzales of TheWrap calling it a "trippy psychedelic thrill ride" and Britt Hayes of ScreenCrush describing it as "astounding, elaborate stuff". On the time travel-centric plot of Endgame, Peter Travers of Rolling Stone found it clichéd but distinctive, while Peter Debruge of Variety called it the "most desperate of narrative cheats". Justin Chang of the Los Angeles Times felt that the use of time travel sacrificed consistency for nostalgia-arousing fan service. Following reports that No Way Home would involve the multiverse, Adam B. Vary of Variety felt that the multiverse could allow Tom Holland, who portrays Parker in the MCU, to appear in the SSU. Graeme McMillian of The Hollywood Reporter speculated whether the Fantastic Four and X-Men would enter the MCU through the multiverse, while Hoai-Tran Bui of /Film questioned whether the addition of multiversal characters would overshadow Holland's performance in No Way Home. Following the film's release, Benjamin Lee of The Guardian applauded Watts for bringing back numerous Spider-Man villains, while John DeFore of The Hollywood Reporter believed that the multiversal plot point addressed the "Iron Man-ification of the character" in prior MCU Spider-Man films. Lee and DeFore also noted the level of fan service present in the film, which was echoed by Bilge Ebiri of Vulture and Don Kaye of Den of Geek.

The depiction of the multiverse in Multiverse of Madness garnered a mixed response from critics. Chang believed that the film's approach to the multiverse allowed the filmmakers to pose intriguing philosophical questions, contrasting this to the multiverse's depiction in the film Everything Everywhere All at Once (2022). TheWrap reviewer Alonso Duralde felt that Multiverse of Madness failed to achieve Everything Everywhere All at Once's level of "wit and nerve and character", but commended the America Portal Ride scene as "memorably trippy". Peter Bradshaw of The Guardian was entertained by the America Portal Ride scene, but felt that the concept of the multiverse reduced the overall story's stakes. DeFore, who also reviewed this film, criticized the MCU's multiverse as a "rapidly aging plot device" and a "franchise-sustaining crutch". David Ehrlich of IndieWire voiced frustration over the fact that the film only focused on two parallel universes despite its title, further ridiculing Earth-838's unusual characteristics. Collider's Ross Bonaime, and The Atlantic's David Sims, and The Mary Sue's Princess Weekes all criticized the film's excessive reliance on fan service. Writing for RogerEbert.com, Brian Tallerico also praised the America Portal Ride sequence, but was disappointed that the film failed to fully tap into the potential of the multiverse. Owen Gleiberman of Variety questioned the logic of the MCU's multiverse.

=== Theories and speculation ===
Evan Peters appears in the ending of the episode "On a Very Special Episode..." of WandaVision as "Pietro Maximoff", after previously portraying Peter Maximoff in Fox's X-Men films. The character was previously portrayed by Aaron Taylor-Johnson in Age of Ultron, with the character Darcy Lewis noting that Pietro had been "recast" in the fictional WandaVision show-within-a-show sitcom. This appearance was widely discussed by commentators, who declared it an exciting surprise. Many critics believed that this set the stage for the multiverse to be explored in future Phase Four properties. In the series finale, "The Series Finale", Peters' character is revealed to actually be Ralph Bohner, a resident of Westview who is being controlled by Agatha Harkness and impersonating Pietro. This twist was met with a mixed response from critics. Matt Purslow of IGN was disappointed that viewers' speculation did not pay off, calling this an "unfair trick from Marvel", while his colleague Carlos Morales criticized the casting as unnecessary and hollow. On the other hand, Stephen Robinson of The A.V. Club felt that this was an "elegantly simple and self-contained" reveal. Chancellor Agard of Entertainment Weekly and Daniel Gillespie of Screen Rant concurred, with Agard relieved that Peters' character was not the same version from the X-Men films and Gillespie praising the casting as a way to generate discussion. Variety's Vary thought this was a "really good joke", but noted how the apparent "multiverse shenanigans" had caused fan speculation to run rampant.

Maguire and Garfield's appearances in No Way Home were kept secret until the film's release, with Holland, Garfield, and Feige repeatedly denying the actors' involvement with the film. As a result, reports of the aforementioned characters' return generated intense speculation and interest online. Multiverse of Madness had a similar level of speculation as No Way Home prior to its release, with many viewers theorizing that non-MCU Marvel characters would appear in the film. Many of these rumors did not pan out, with the notable exception of Stewart, who initially denied his involvement. Waldron expressed interest in the rumor that Tom Cruise would portray an alternate version of Iron Man, but stated that Cruise was never approached due to his filming commitments to Mission: Impossible – Dead Reckoning Part One (2023) and The Final Reckoning (2025). Ryan Reynolds, who portrays Wade Wilson / Deadpool in Fox's X-Men films, rejected claims that he would appear in the film, but Waldron revealed that discussions were held regarding whether to include a cameo appearance by him. Roger Cheng of CNET was disappointed by the Illuminati cameos in Multiverse of Madness due to their limited screentime, opining that the cameos failed to elicit the same feeling of excitement as No Way Home did. Similarly, Kirsten Acuna of Business Insider dismissed the cameos as "gimmicky fan service" and a missed opportunity. Belen Edwards of Mashable argued the opposite, believing that the Illuminati's quick and brutal death sequences were a "nice change of pace" from No Way Home's level of fan service.

The introduction of the concept of incursions in Multiverse of Madness led several commentators to believe that Marvel Studios was setting up for an adaptation of Secret Wars (2015), in which incursions play a key role. Evaluating the direction of the MCU, Vary noted the prevalence of the multiverse and the introduction of Kang as a potential "big bad". Feige later revealed that recent MCU projects contained hints as to where the franchise was heading, igniting further speculation.

In regards to rumors about possible cameos for Deadpool & Wolverine from characters of past non-MCU Marvel films like Jennifer Garner's Elektra Natchios from Daredevil (2003) and Elektra (2005), Liev Schreiber's Sabretooth from X-Men Origins: Wolverine (2009) or Taylor Swift making a cameo appearance as Dazzler, director Shawn Levy noted that some rumored appearances were true while others were not. Levy noted how the characters that were included in the film were added to its story as it developed rather than being based on a "wishlist" of characters and cameos the producers wanted to include, adding that he and the filmmakers were "disciplinarian" and "judicious" over which characters to choose from the unlimited access to the Marvel film legacy as long as the film was "warm-hearted" by vesting in those characters, like Pyro due to sharing the same powers as the Human Torch, though he admitted some inclusions were more personal like that of Tyler Mane's Sabretooth due to Zeb Wells' love for the character.

=== Comments from filmmakers ===
Waldron acknowledged the danger of using the multiverse as a plot device in the MCU, believing that the stakes of the story could be reduced "if you don't make it personal". Loveness echoed Waldron's comments, adding that he hoped to "evolve" the MCU's multiversal storytelling. He also found it a challenge to make the MCU's multiverse feel unique, given its presence in Rick and Morty, Everything Everywhere All at Once, and the Sony Pictures Animation film Spider-Man: Into the Spider-Verse (2018). Joe Russo, who co-directed Endgame with his brother Anthony, cautioned that an overabundance of multiverse-centric films could lead to adverse results, calling on screenwriters to "push back" against film studios' corporate agendas. Terminator: Dark Fate (2019) director Tim Miller felt that Endgame's depiction of time travel was inferior to that of the Terminator franchise because it lowered the story's stakes. The Wolverine (2013) and Logan director James Mangold, despite his past work in the interconnected X-Men film series, expressed his dislike for multiverses and multi-movie universe-building, deeming them the "enemy and death" of storytelling because people care more for "the way the Legos connect" over how the story works for the audience, which should be in an emotional level instead of "intellectually" through Easter eggs.

== In other media ==
=== Sony's Spider-Man Universe ===
The mid-credits scene of the SSU film Venom: Let There Be Carnage (2021) sees Brock and Venom being transported to the MCU through the multiverse as a result of Strange's first spell in Spider-Man: No Way Home. Feige stated that this scene was the product of significant collaboration between Marvel Studios and Sony Pictures, and was directed by Watts during the production of that film. After the release of Let There Be Carnage, many commentators expected Hardy to reprise his roles in No Way Home, with the character ultimately appearing in the film's mid-credits scene. Audiences reacted positively to Let There Be Carnage's mid-credits scene, though William Hughes of The A.V. Club and Vinnie Mancuso of Collider both noted how the scene overshadowed the rest of the film. Across the Spider-Verse later gives the designation of Brock's home world as "Earth-688".

In a similar fashion, the two mid-credits scenes of the SSU film Morbius (2022) see the MCU's Adrian Toomes / Vulture, portrayed by Michael Keaton and last seen in the film Spider-Man: Homecoming (2017), transported to the SSU as a result of Strange's second spell in No Way Home. He proceeds to ally with Morbius's titular character, Michael Morbius, with the intention of forming a team to defeat Spider-Man. Director Daniel Espinosa stated that it was always Sony's intention to have Keaton cameo as Toomes, citing the animated Into the Spider-Verse as the primary inspiration for the scenes. Both scenes received an overwhelmingly negative response from critics, who found them confusing and unsatisfying. Writing for The Mary Sue, Julia Glassman felt that the scenes "[fell] flat" unlike Let There Be Carnage's mid-credits scene, while Kate Erbland of IndieWire was puzzled by Keaton's sudden appearance. Time Out's Cathy Brennan opined that the scenes were a weak attempt by Sony to "court an audience by dangling a potential connection" to the MCU, while Esquire's Brady Langmann and Den of Geek's Kaye criticized the scenes' poor writing and lack of logic. Eliana Dockterman of Time described the scene as fulfilling Sony's "corporate mandate" of connecting the SSU to the MCU, pointing out how it contradicted many plot elements of Homecoming and No Way Home.

=== Animated Spider-Verse ===
In Spider-Man: Across the Spider-Verse (2023), the sequel to Into the Spider-Verse, Miguel O' Hara / Spider-Man 2099 alludes to the events of No Way Home and refers to the MCU as "Earth-199999". Co-director Kemp Powers later stated that the No Way Home reference was meant to be a meta gag and throwaway line that screenwriters Phil Lord and Christopher Miller came up with to add humor to their films, confirming that it has no connections to the MCU. Donald Glover makes a live-action cameo appearance in the film as Aaron Davis / Prowler, after he previously portrayed a version of the character in Homecoming.

=== X-Men '97 ===
X-Men '97 (2024), the Disney+ revival of X-Men: The Animated Series (1992–1997), was produced by Marvel Studios Animation, but it is set in a separate continuity from the MCU's Sacred Timeline, though Winderbaum suggested that the show's characters can appear eventually in MCU projects thanks to the potential for connections from Loki and every other multiverse stories, saying that "if your brain wants to go there, you know there's always the potential for connections" while acknowledging that the show takes place in a universe of different 1990s cartoons. The first season's fifth episode featured a cameo appearance of Uatu in the sky, with the character resembling his appearance in What If...?; head director and supervising producer Jake Castorena thus commented that everything in the MCU was "absolutely connected" such as Uatu's cameo, comparing the show to the MCU for its many cameo appearances from different characters before the film franchise's creation, though he admitted that while the cameo may not have been in the script, it was discussed in very early conversations to include the Watcher due to the episode's significant events. However, former head writer Beau DeMayo stated on Twitter that he and the showrunners saw the show set in its "own branching tree" over the MCU's, referencing Loki, but concluded it would depend on Marvel whether to make connections and admitted "a few leaves" may mingle with another at some point. While the series isn't set in the MCU's Sacred Timeline, episode director Emi Yonemura stated that Feige did consider making the show canon within the MCU at one point, but desisted due to the original series being set in its own universe whereas the mutants have just started appearing in the MCU since Multiverse of Madness, which enabled the showrunners to do justice to the X-Men and their fans just as the MCU starts depicting mutants more and more according to Castorena, who insisted to let both depictions be different, with Yonemura arguing that if they try to connect the show's universe with the MCU, it may hinder storytelling; they are better off by letting them be separate.

=== Your Friendly Neighborhood Spider-Man ===
Your Friendly Neighborhood Spider-Man (2025), a Disney+ animated television series, is set in an alternate timeline from the main films and television series of the MCU where Norman Osborn becomes Peter Parker's mentor instead of Tony Stark. The first season's tenth episode featured a cameo appearance of Uatu in the sky after Doctor Strange wishes Spider-Man well in his destiny, with the character resembling his appearance in What If...?; series creator Jeff Trambell stated that the cameo was more of a reference to What If...? than to the show's upcoming second season, enjoying the idea that the Watcher looks other worlds and universes the audience see despite the show being "very grounded, street-level" and intending to keep its tone that way. The show was originally intended to be set in the MCU's Sacred Timeline, but the creative team soon found that the idea limited them too much their story possibilities to the point of not letting them "being fun" for the sake of locking in continuity, so they opted to "let it have a live and go where it wanted to go", taking advantage of the multiverse to explore an alternate timeline where the timeline diverges from Captain America: Civil War (2016) by changing Parker's mentor and his journey's route from that point onwards.

=== Disney Parks ===
Several MCU-themed attractions at Disney Parks locations are inspired by the MCU, but are said to take place in an alternate universe parallel to Earth-616 within the multiverse. These attractions include Avengers Campus at Disney California Adventure and Disney Adventure World, Stark Expo Hong Kong at Hong Kong Disneyland, Guardians of the Galaxy: Cosmic Rewind at EPCOT, and Avengers: Quantum Encounter on the Disney Wish. In this universe, the Blip and its ensuing aftermath did not occur, such as Stark's death, and the Avengers have established campuses across the globe to recruit new heroes. At the D23 Expo in September 2022, a new multiverse-focused attraction at Disney California Adventure was revealed to be in development, featuring numerous MCU heroes from multiple universes on a quest to defeat a variant of Thanos called "King Thanos". The attraction will be called Avengers Infinity Defense.

== See also ==
- Features of the Marvel Cinematic Universe
- Multiverse (DC Comics)
