= Loki season 2 =

Loki
- Season 2
- Promotional poster
- Starring: Tom Hiddleston; Sophia Di Martino; Wunmi Mosaku; Eugene Cordero; Rafael Casal; Kate Dickie; Liz Carr; Neil Ellice; Ke Huy Quan; Owen Wilson; Gugu Mbatha-Raw; Tara Strong; Richard Dixon; Jonathan Majors
- No. of episodes: 6

Release
- Original network: Disney+
- Original release: October 5 – November 9, 2023

Season chronology
- ← Previous; Season 1

The second season of the American television series Loki, based on Marvel Comics featuring the character of the same name, sees Loki working with Mobius M. Mobius, Hunter B-15, and other members of the Time Variance Authority (TVA) to navigate the multiverse to find Sylvie, Ravonna Renslayer, and Miss Minutes. It is set in the Marvel Cinematic Universe (MCU), sharing continuity with the films of the franchise. The season is produced by Marvel Studios, with Eric Martin serving as head writer and Justin Benson and Aaron Moorhead leading the directing team.

Tom Hiddleston reprises his role as Loki from the film series, starring alongside Sophia Di Martino (Sylvie), Wunmi Mosaku (Hunter B-15), Eugene Cordero, Neil Ellice, Owen Wilson (Mobius), Gugu Mbatha-Raw (Renslayer), Tara Strong (Miss Minutes), and Jonathan Majors reprising their roles from the first season, alongside Rafael Casal, Kate Dickie, Liz Carr, Ke Huy Quan, and Richard Dixon. Development on a second season had begun by November 2020, and was confirmed in July 2021, with Martin, Benson, and Moorhead all hired by late February 2022. Filming began in June 2022 at Pinewood Studios and concluded in October. Dan DeLeeuw and Kasra Farahani were revealed as additional directors for the season in June 2023.

The second season debuted on Disney+ on October 5, 2023, and ran for six episodes until November 9, as part of Phase Five of the MCU. The season received positive reviews from critics, with praise for its conclusion, musical score, and Loki's character arc.

== Episodes ==
No. overall	No. in season	Title	Directed by	Written by	Original release date
7	1	"Ouroboros"	Justin Benson & Aaron Moorhead	Eric Martin	October 5, 2023
In the past, the Time Variance Authority (TVA) attempts to apprehend Loki while he is uncontrollably warping across time in their headquarters. In the present, Loki reunites with Mobius M. Mobius and warns him of the threat posed by the many variants of He Who Remains, the TVA's creator. Concurrently, TVA General Dox has several TVA hunters arm themselves, ostensibly to find Sylvie, who caused the Sacred Timeline to branch after killing He Who Remains. Loki and Mobius meet TVA technician Ouroboros, who deduces that Loki is "time slipping", a phenomenon possibly caused by branching timelines dangerously overloading the Temporal Loom. To save Loki, Ouroboros instructs Mobius to approach the Temporal Loom with the Temporal Aura Extractor device to extract Loki from the time stream as Loki prunes himself. Loki time slips to the future, where the TVA is being evacuated as the Loom goes critical, and he encounters Sylvie before he is pruned by someone at the last minute. In the present, Mobius successfully pulls Loki from the time stream, and they set out to find Sylvie. In a mid-credits scene, Sylvie enters a branched timeline in Broxton, Oklahoma, 1982 and visits a McDonald's restaurant.
8	2	"Breaking Brad"	Dan DeLeeuw	Eric Martin	October 12, 2023
Loki, Mobius, and Hunter B-15 find and capture Hunter X-5 in London, 1977 on the Sacred Timeline, where he lives as film actor Brad Wolfe. Under interrogation, he admits to abandoning Dox's mission and reveals Sylvie's location. Meanwhile, Ouroboros attempts to repair the Loom to safely accommodate the branching timelines, but discovers he cannot access it without help from the missing Miss Minutes or He Who Remains's aura. Loki, Mobius and Wolfe travel to Oklahoma and find Sylvie working in a McDonald's. Loki tells her of their encounter in the TVA's future and asks for her assistance to figure out what would happen, but Sylvie refuses to involve herself with the organization. After Wolfe proclaims the group is in mortal danger, Sylvie enchants him, forcing him to reveal Dox's plan to simultaneously destroy the branching timelines with reset charges. Sending Wolfe back into custody, Loki, Mobius, and Sylvie capture Dox, but her plan has largely succeeded and some of her loyalists have escaped. As TVA receptionist Casey tracks the rogue Ravonna Renslayer's TemPad on one of the remaining branching timelines, Sylvie declares that the TVA is rotten and returns to McDonald's with He Who Remains's TemPad in her possession.
9	3	"1893"	Kasra Farahani	Teleplay by : Eric Martin and Kasra Farahani & Jason O'Leary; Story by : Eric Martin	October 19, 2023
Miss Minutes and Renslayer travel to Chicago, 1868 to secretly drop the TVA Handbook to a young Victor Timely, a variant of He Who Remains, who had arranged this before his death. They then travel to the 1893 Chicago World's Fair on this branched timeline, where Loki and Mobius arrive tracking Renslayer's TemPad and see Timely presenting his Temporal Loom prototype. Timely then has four groups chasing him: Loki and Mobius, who need his aura to fix the Loom; Renslayer and Miss Minutes, who want him to take his variant's place with them at his side; Sylvie, who wants to kill him to prevent his rise to power; and a robber baron and his allies wanting revenge against Timely's fake invention scam. Timely abandons Renslayer for proposing a partnership. At Timely's Wisconsin laboratory, he turns Miss Minutes off after she professes romantic love for him. Renslayer, Loki, Mobius, and Sylvie arrive, with Sylvie gaining control. Sylvie allows Loki to take Timely back to the TVA, then sends Renslayer to the Citadel at the End of Time with Miss Minutes being brought along. They see He Who Remains' decaying corpse as Miss Minutes reveals that she knows a secret about Renslayer.
10	4	"Heart of the TVA"	Aaron Moorhead & Justin Benson	Eric Martin and Katharyn Blair	October 26, 2023
Miss Minutes reveals that in the past, Renslayer commanded He Who Remains' army; he proposed to lead the TVA with Renslayer, then had Miss Minutes erase the memories of Renslayer and other TVA employees. As the Temporal Loom reaches catastrophic failure, Loki and his allies attempt to use Timely and Ouroboros's Throughput Multiplier to fix it. Ouroboros reveals that the source of his knowledge is Timely himself in an ontological paradox. Renslayer and Miss Minutes attempt to take over the TVA, approaching the detained Wolfe, Dox and her loyalists for help. Only Wolfe agrees; Dox and her loyalists instead choose to be crushed to death by Miss Minutes. Wolfe prunes Hunter D-90 and kidnaps Timely. While staging a rescue, Sylvie and Loki encounter his time-slipping past self; Loki prunes his past self. (Note: As depicted in "Ouroboros") Ouroboros deactivates Miss Minutes and the TVA's magic-suppressing devices. This enables Sylvie to enchant Wolfe, controlling him to prune Renslayer. Rescued, Timely restores access to the Loom, but when he approaches the Loom, the increased temporal radiation spaghettifies him before the Throughput Multiplier can be launched. The Temporal Loom explodes, and the blast wave spreads toward Loki, Mobius, Sylvie, B-15, Casey, and Ouroboros in the TVA.
11	5	"Science/Fiction"	Justin Benson & Aaron Moorhead	Eric Martin	November 2, 2023
Loki survives the explosion, but everyone else has vanished and the TVA headquarters spaghettifies. Loki escapes as he begins time slipping again, taking him to branched timelines where his friends Mobius, Hunter B-15, Casey, and Ouroboros were reset to their original lives as Don, Dr. Verity Willis, Frank Morris, and Dr. A.D. Doug, respectively. Wanting to time slip to before the explosion, Loki enlists Doug's help. With Loki unable to control his time slipping, Doug proposes Loki gather everyone present at the explosion back together, so that their collective temporal aura can send them back to the right time and place. Doug builds a TemPad using a TVA Handbook that Loki kept. Loki succeeds in gathering everyone else to Doug's workshop except Sylvie, who has retained her memories. Refusing to help, Sylvie makes Loki admit his true motivation: he wants his friends back and fears being alone. When everything in Sylvie's timeline spaghettifies, she goes to help Loki. However, Doug's workshop also spaghettifies, as do Frank, Doug, Don, Willis, and Sylvie. Loki finally controls his time slipping by focusing on a person. Declaring that he can "rewrite the story", Loki time slips to before the explosion by focusing on Ouroboros.
12	6	"Glorious Purpose"	Aaron Moorhead & Justin Benson	Eric Martin	November 9, 2023
Loki time slips to the moment before the Temporal Loom's explosion. (Note: As depicted in "Heart of the TVA" (2023)) Despite his attempts, the Loom ultimately fails to accommodate the infinite branches. Loki slips to the moment before Sylvie kills He Who Remains, (Note: As depicted in "For All Time. Always." (2021)) who tells Loki that the Loom is a fail-safe; overloading it protects the Sacred Timeline by deleting the branches along with the TVA. He Who Remains suggests Loki kill Sylvie to save the Loom, which Loki rejects. After consulting Mobius and Sylvie at different moments in time, (Note: During the events of "Glorious Purpose" (2021) and "Science/Fiction" (2023), respectively.) Loki replaces Timely in approaching the Loom. Loki destroys the Loom, magically rejuvenates the dying timelines and rearranges them into a tree-like structure, (Note: Interpreted as a reference to Yggdrasil, the Norse tree of life, by reviewers from Collider, The A.V. Club, Space.com and Vulture.) committing himself to oversee the branches alone at the End of Time. The TVA now tracks He Who Remains' variants across the growing branches, with Mobius reporting one variant being stopped at Earth-616's "adjacent realm". (Note: As depicted in Ant-Man and the Wasp: Quantumania (2023)) B-15 becomes one of the TVA's leaders. Ouroboros reactivates a now-friendly Miss Minutes and writes a new TVA Handbook with Timely as co-author. In one timeline, Timely did not receive the TVA Handbook in 1868. Renslayer awakens in the Void and encounters Alioth. Mobius retires from the TVA; he and Sylvie observe Don and his children from afar, while Loki watches over them from the End of Time.

== Cast and characters ==
- Tom Hiddleston as Loki:
  Thor's adopted brother and the god of mischief, based on the Norse mythological deity of the same name. He is an alternate, "time variant" version of Loki who created a new timeline in Avengers: Endgame (2019) beginning in 2012. He is time slipping, being pulled through time between the past, present, and future. Hiddleston said the season sees Loki "understanding himself", having found this new Time Variance Authority (TVA) family and his "new capacity to make connections", with the character finally finding a meaning and purpose in trying to help protect the TVA and his friends there.
- Sophia Di Martino as Sylvie:
  A variant of Loki who broke the timeline through killing He Who Remains in a misguided act of revenge. The season sees Sylvie working as a cashier at a McDonald's in a branched timeline, in 1982 Broxton, Oklahoma.
- Wunmi Mosaku as Hunter B-15:
  A high-ranking Hunter of the TVA. Following the branching of the timeline, she is working to reform the TVA and protect the new timelines and variants, given she has learned she is variant herself.
  - Mosaku also portrays Verity Willis, a pediatrician from 2012 New York City.
- Eugene Cordero as Casey: A TVA receptionist.
  - Cordero also portrays Frank Morris, a famous bank robber and Alcatraz escapee.
- Rafael Casal as Hunter X-5 / Brad Wolfe:
  A TVA Hunter with a close connection to General Dox. Casal called Hunter X-5 "Loki's mirror—another person who feels wronged. He's a bit of a lost character and almost feels like an earlier version of Loki, reflecting back to him." Director Dan DeLeeuw called X-5 "more of a straight villain, more of a heavy; a foil for Loki". Executive producer Kevin R. Wright spoke to X-5's relationship to Dox, noting it had a "maternal" quality, but questioned how much of that was because of their past lives, or "institutionalized from being in the TVA". X-5 finds his real life on the Sacred Timeline and becomes the actor Brad Wolfe. DeLeeuw thought Casal "brought an interesting humanity" to his portrayal of Wolfe, explaining that it was his choice to become Wolfe to break free from the TVA being X-5's reality. As well, the creative team "couldn't resist" having a character who no longer believed in the reality of the TVA becoming an actor, given Wolfe now "puts on a perception of reality for a living".
- Kate Dickie as General Dox: A TVA general who is part of the new TVA council of judges following Renslayer's disappearance. She is searching for Sylvie and still believes in the TVA's mission to prune branched timelines.
- Liz Carr as Judge Gamble: A TVA judge who is part of the TVA council.
- Neil Ellice as Hunter D-90: A TVA Hunter.
- Ke Huy Quan as Ouroboros:
  A TVA technician who works in its Repairs and Advancement Department. Described as the "quirky repair guy", Wright explained that every piece of technology at the TVA was either designed by Ouroboros or he knows how to fix it and keep it operational. Quan felt Ouroboros was thrilled to be doing his job, despite working long hours alone in isolation. Introducing the character in the season was meant to highlight other parts of the TVA not seen in the first season to show how "massive" the organization was.
  - Quan also portrays A.D. Doug, theoretical physics teacher at Caltech and failed science fiction author from 1994 Pasadena, California.
- Owen Wilson as Mobius M. Mobius: An agent of the TVA and friend of Loki. Wilson said that the season explores more of Mobius' past and sees him struggling to accept a new reality, with the character losing some of his control and becoming more vulnerable.
  - Wilson also portrays Don, a jet ski salesman and single father from 2022 Cleveland, Ohio.
- Gugu Mbatha-Raw as Ravonna Renslayer: A former TVA judge who has gone missing and has connections to He Who Remains.
- Tara Strong as Miss Minutes:
  The animated anthropomorphic AI clock mascot of the TVA created by He Who Remains who is in love with him and jealous of Renslayer. Humanizing Miss Minutes and exploring her human desires and aspirations was discussed early on in the season's development. Director/production designer Kasra Farahani noted how "reductive characters" are referred to as cartoons "in a pejorative way", and the creatives wanted to give Miss Minutes, an actual cartoon, "these super awkward and complex emotional feelings". Natasha Arancini acts as the on-set stand-in for Miss Minutes.
- Richard Dixon as Robber Baron: An industrialist who purchases a faulty invention from Victor Timely at the 1893 Chicago's World's Fair.
- Jonathan Majors as Victor Timely and He Who Remains: Variants of Kang the Conqueror.
  - Victor Timely is an industrialist and inventor in 1893 on a branched timeline who has created an early version of the Temporal Loom. He has a stutter and an awkward, timid personality, and acts as a con man selling others his creations. Discussing the contrasting personality of Timely to other Kang variants, Wright said it was "fun" to have Timely be "sort of an eccentric, quiet inventor that maybe is, like, a bit out of time and out of place" rather than the expectation of the next Kang variant to appear in the MCU to be "some sci-fi villain from the future". Marvel Studios was excited to continue exploring Kang and his variants in the season, particularly wanting Timely for Loki, with Wright noting his inclusion and integration would be "a big part" of the season. Majors and Farahani were drawn to real-life inventor Granville Woods, whose life had many parallels to Timely's, with Majors creating Timely's mannerisms, physicality, quirkiness and "the specific mix of how he represented intellectual brilliance with social awkwardness, a degree of charlatanism and pathos". Nasri Thompson portrays a young Timely.
  - He Who Remains is a scientist from the 31st century who ended the first multiversal war by destroying "evil variants" of himself and created the TVA to prevent a new multiverse from forming and to keep his variants from coming back into existence.

Directors Justin Benson and Aaron Moorhead and cinematographer Isaac Bauman have cameos in the season as John Anglin, Clarence Anglin, and a dirt bike enthusiast, respectively.

== Production ==
=== Development ===
Loki star Tom Hiddleston and executive producer Kevin R. Wright began having conversations during production of the season one episode "Lamentis" regarding "how this world could build out" to "dive deeper into it". Development on a second season had begun by November 2020. In January 2021, the first season's head writer Michael Waldron signed an overall deal with Disney which included his involvement in the second season of Loki. Marvel Studios producer Nate Moore, who served as an executive producer on the series The Falcon and the Winter Soldier, believed Loki had "really irreverent and clever and cool" storylines that lent to the series having multiple seasons rather than being a one-off event. The second season was confirmed through a mid-credits scene in the first-season finale, which was released in July 2021, and Hiddleston said "deep discussions" about the second season were already underway. First season director Kate Herron said she would not return for the second season as she had always planned to only be involved for one season, while Waldron said it "remain[ed] to be seen" if he would be involved.

In February 2022, the directing duo Justin Benson and Aaron Moorhead were hired to direct a majority of the episodes for the second season. They previously directed two episodes of another Marvel Studios series, Moon Knight (2022), which went so well that the studio wanted them to work on other projects and they were quickly chosen for the second season of Loki. Marvel Studios' Kevin Feige had approached the duo while they were working on additional photography for Moon Knight to have them meet with Wright and Hiddleston to discuss coming on board for the season. Eric Martin, a first-season writer who took over some of Waldron's duties during production on that season, was set to write all six episodes of the second season, with Hiddleston and Waldron confirmed to be returning as executive producers. Benson and Moorhead were excited to approach another character in Loki who, like Moon Knight's Marc Spector / Moon Knight, was defined by being an outcast and had "complexity in being [an] outcast". Pre-production had begun by the end of April 2022. Dan DeLeeuw, a visual effects supervisor and second unit director on several MCU films, and season one production designer Kasra Farahani were revealed as directors in June 2023; they each directed one episode of the season, with Benson and Moorhead directing the other four. DeLeeuw was chosen to direct given his past work directing second units for Marvel Studios, as well as his approach to character in the visual effects reviews of season one, and Farahani, being a writer and director, was chosen because he "really understood the world and helped build it". Wright said both "were steady hands who knew this world and these characters". Executive producers for the season include Marvel Studios' Feige, Stephen Broussard, Louis D'Esposito, Victoria Alonso, Brad Winderbaum, and Wright, alongside Hiddleston, Benson and Moorhead, Martin, and Waldron.

=== Writing ===
Farahani, Jason O'Leary, and Katharyn Blair served as writers on the season alongside Martin, with Farahani acting as a staff writer for the season. Waldron said the season would continue the story of the first season but in a way that felt different, subverted expectations, and explored "new emotional ground" for Loki. Hiddleston explained that Loki is once again with the Time Variance Authority (TVA) and working with Mobius M. Mobius, despite Mobius not remembering Loki, and has confronted Sylvie about her actions at the end of the first season. He added that the second season would be "a battle for the soul of the TVA". More of the TVA's history is explored in the season. Wright explained that much of the "core character conflict" in the season came from the TVA and each's relationship to it, stating, "We want everybody to be in the gray area — they're neither good nor bad. They might make bad choices or heroic choices, but they are trying to figure out who they are. The TVA felt like the place where we could maximize that storytelling and learn more about those characters through that." Much of the season was about each character becoming the best versions of themselves. Wright stated that the creatives wanted to push the weirdness of the series further in the second season, while still keeping the longer, character-driven moments, notably the friendship between Loki and Mobius. The writers took caution to not start the season by "fast-forwarding through the drama" from the end of the first season, but to sit with and explore Loki and Sylvie's "emotional turmoil" they have entering the season. The season will help connect the entire Multiverse Saga of the MCU.

Following the end of filming the season one finale, "For All Time. Always", executive producer Kevin R. Wright and actress Sophia Di Martino began an informal discussion of Sylvie's future, with Di Martino thinking she would be hungry after the death of He Who Remains concluded her long revenge mission. As development on the second season began, Wright felt that having Sylvie visit a 1980s McDonald's would be "appealing" for her as a place to "slow down", being drawn to that location based on the nostalgia a young child had going there after a sporting event or for a birthday party, which Sylvie never experienced. The 1982 McDonald's location was written into the script before approaching the company, a reverse of the typical brand partnerships in media, with Wright thinking McDonald's would view the inclusion as trying to make fun of them rather than the "earnest story [and] love letter" they were creating. Marvel Studios had an existing marketing partnership with McDonald's, with the restaurant also looking to collaborate with brands beyond the typical product tie-in, leading to McDonald's approving its inclusion in the season. McDonald's global chief marketing officer Morgan Flatley believed Sylvie's story aligned with their brand of "providing comfort and familiarity". The McDonald's is located in Broxton, Oklahoma, which was chosen as "a tip of the hat to fans", given it was the location of Asgard in the comics in the late 2000s and early 2010s, and "a little bit of a nod to the DNA" of Sylvie, since she is partially based on Sylvie Lushton who was from Broxton in the comics. The season also visits 1970s London and the 1893 Chicago World's Fair.

Discussing the various time "jargon" and "timey-wimey" logic introduced the season, Wright explained that although long, detailed versions were created to work from, these were eventually condensed and simplified to make it easier for the audience to understand and follow along, conceding that "simplicity and visuals" make it "fun and intriguing". According to Martin, the themes of the season were order versus chaos and "what happens in a power vacuum", likening the season's overarching concept to the phrase "you break it, you buy it".

=== Casting ===
Hiddleston, Gugu Mbatha-Raw, Wunmi Mosaku, Eugene Cordero, Tara Strong, Owen Wilson, and Sophia Di Martino return from the first season as Loki, Ravonna Renslayer, Hunter B-15, Casey, Miss Minutes, Mobius M. Mobius, and Sylvie, respectively. Jonathan Majors also returns in the season as He Who Remains, while also portraying an additional variant of Kang the Conqueror, who he played in the film Ant-Man and the Wasp: Quantumania (2023), named Victor Timely; Timely was also introduced at the end of Quantumania, appearing in that film's mid-credits scene. Director Peyton Reed stated that the usage of the scene had felt natural due to the MCU's focus on multiversal stories, and the fact that the season and film were being concurrently developed. Majors was expected to appear in around half of the season's episodes. Neil Ellice also returns as Hunter D-90. Cordero and Ellice were made series regulars for the season. In May 2022, Feige stated that the "whole cast" would return from the first season.

In July 2022, Rafael Casal was confirmed to be cast in a "major role" in the season, TVA Hunter X-5 and the actor Brad Wolfe. In September, Ke Huy Quan was revealed to have been cast as TVA agent and technician Ouroboros "O. B.". Casting director Sarah Halley Finn suggested Quan for the series after seeing an early screening of his film Everything Everywhere All at Once (2022), with Marvel working quickly to offer him a part ahead of that film's wide release in April 2022, knowing it would result in Quan receiving many additional acting offers. Feige also personally reached out to Quan about accepting the role, not knowing that he was already a fan of the MCU and Loki's first season in particular. In December 2022, Kate Dickie was revealed to have been cast in the villain role of General Dox. Liz Carr also stars as Judge Gamble, while Richard Dixon stars as Robber Baron.

=== Design ===
Farahani also returned as production designer for the season. He described the new areas of the TVA seen in the season as the "foundation" of the organization, believing they would have been built earlier than the locations seen in season one. These new locations had "more of a cold war, 1950s aesthetic" featuring "understated, muted greens", though the yellow and orange colors established in the first season are still present as accents. Cinematographer Isaac Bauman described the season's design as "Soviet brutalism and mid-century modern". Bauman and Farahani worked together to integrate the lighting into the TVA sets. New sets for the season included O. B.'s work area, the temporal core, and the 1893 Chicago World's Fair, with Wright believing that set was larger than the one built for Lamentis in the first season.

Christine Wada returned as costume designer, noting character's costumes were still "anchored" to the TVA's design, even when they venture outside the TVA. She felt Sylvie's costume in the season was one of the more difficult to create, noting her acid wash jeans had to be printed to have multiple versions since they could not be bought given the variation in acid wash patterns between different eras. Additionally, Sylvie's herringbone jacket "took forever to get [tonally right]" as Wada wanted it to have a stealth quality to fit with the character and not be "too contrasty" and "bump in other eras". Quan suggested to Wada that O. B.'s TVA jumpsuit have various patches on it, as a reference to his character Data in The Goonies (1985).

=== Filming ===
Principal photography began on June 13, 2022, at Pinewood Studios in the United Kingdom, with Benson and Moorhead, DeLeeuw, and Farahani directing. It was previously reported to begin in January 2022, under the working title Architect. Isaac Bauman serves as cinematographer for the majority of the season, with Oliver Loncraine doing so for the second episode of the season. Bauman created a 700-page document for the look of the season. He did not try to emulate the work done by the first season's cinematographer Autumn Durald Arkapaw, realizing that she had just brought "her own voice" to the season rather than employing "any specific technique or aesthetic" and noted he had different qualities to his approach to cinematography. Bauman realized to retain a similarity to the first season, he would "need to do everything completely differently the way that I would want to do it". Shooting the season, Bauman tried to mimic the filming style of the late 1960s and early 1970s, with "softer lighting" and a "modernized version of that cellular... late '60s, early 70s stock film". References for the cinematography for Bauman included 2001: A Space Odyssey (1968), Live and Let Die (1973), and other big-budget films of that era, as well as more modern films set in that time period such as Munich (2005). While filming in the TVA, Bauman used super wide lenses and a handheld camera style. He adjusted lenses when the season went to different time periods to try to reflect the photography style of those eras. Much of the same crew and department heads that worked on season one in Atlanta were retained for the season's shoot in London. Ahead of shooting, all the directors, writers, and actors took two weeks to read through and rehearse each of the scripts to improve upon them before filming began.

In July 2022, location filming occurred throughout London, and at the Chatham Historic Dockyard in Kent. The 1982 McDonald's location was filmed in a former restaurant building in England, with Marvel Studios working with McDonald's archivist and historian Mike Bullington to ensure the set decorations were as accurate as possible. The company sent six pieces of restaurant equipment, such as cash registers and straw dispensers, to England for use on the set. Bullington suggested a drive-through be built at the set location, given they had become a popular feature of McDonald's restaurants at that time following their introduction in 1975. Filming concluded in October. The gross budget for pre-production and filming was $176.8 million, with a net budget of $141.3 million. A deleted scene from the season shows Loki listing people who said he "was a problem", including Donald Blake, Carl Creel / Absorbing Man, Hercules, and Amora / Enchantress.

=== Post-production ===
Wright stated the season was the first Marvel Studios project to not undergo any additional photography. As such, Majors' appearance in the season was not altered given his legal issues that began in March 2023, with Wright feeling it would have been "hasty to do anything" without knowing his legal outcome. Calum Ross, Emma McCleave, and Paul Zucker return from the first season as editors. Visual effects were provided by Framestore, Trixter, Industrial Light & Magic, Rising Sun Pictures, FuseFX, and Cantina Creative. Christopher Townsend serves as the visual effects supervisor.

=== Music ===
Natalie Holt was set to return from the first season as the composer by July 2022, and planned to begin scoring the season in late 2022. Holt's score for the season was released digitally by Hollywood Records and Marvel Music in two volumes: one for the first three episodes on October 27, 2023, and one for the final three episodes on November 17, 2023.

Loki: Season 2 – Vol. 1 (Episodes 1–3) [Original Soundtrack]
No.	Title	Length
1.	"Burden of Wisdom"	2:06
2.	"Face Through the Wall"	3:14
3.	"O.B."	2:23
4.	"Slip in Time"	1:47
5.	"Temporal Loom"	2:08
6.	"Origins 1868"	1:10
7.	"Evacuate TVA"	1:36
8.	"One Shot"	2:51
9.	"The Architect (Demo)"	1:40
10.	"Zaniac"	1:56
11.	"Jet Ski Whisper"	1:31
12.	"Tricks"	1:48
13.	"Ready for Round Two"	2:03
14.	"Q&A"	4:26
15.	"Minute Men Attack"	2:16
16.	"Those Were Lives"	2:07
17.	"Golden Olden"	0:44
18.	"Chicago 1892"	1:56
19.	"Time to Go"	2:29
20.	"You"	2:04
21.	"Your Girl"	2:05
22.	"Giant Clock"	0:41
23.	"Not the Man You Think"	2:41
24.	"Delivery"	1:31
25.	"Requiem for All Time"	2:54
Total length:		52:07

Loki: Season 2 – Vol. 2 (Episodes 4–6) [Original Soundtrack]
No.	Title	Length
1.	"Loki's Binding"	2:22
2.	"Spaghettification"	1:10
3.	"A Doll's House"	2:31
4.	"We Are Gods"	1:54
5.	"Box Massacre"	2:11
6.	"The Multiplier Effect"	1:41
7.	"Non-homogenous"	1:29
8.	"TVA Handbook"	0:49
9.	"Gangway Style"	2:11
10.	"It Should Be Me"	2:41
11.	"San Francisco, California 1962"	2:10
12.	"Pasadena, California 1994"	2:55
13.	"Hot Chocolate"	2:03
14.	"Fiction Problem"	2:32
15.	"Temporal Meltdown"	1:36
16.	"Here Before"	1:50
17.	"It's Over"	2:40
18.	"About Who"	1:06
19.	"Try Again"	1:08
20.	"Back"	1:35
21.	"Cleveland, Ohio 2022"	3:05
22.	"Lessons from the Past"	1:43
23.	"It's Working"	2:10
24.	"Infinite Mistakes"	2:11
25.	"Science/Fiction"	3:37
26.	"Fail-Safe"	3:33
27.	"Complex and Many"	1:27
28.	"Singularity"	2:29
29.	"Ascension"	4:49
30.	"Purpose Is Glorious"	3:08
31.	"History Is Now"	2:32
Total length:		69:34

== Marketing ==
Hiddleston, Di Martino, and Wilson shared footage from the season at the 2022 D23 Expo along with announcing Quan's casting. The first trailer was released on July 31, 2023. Charles Pulliam-Moore from The Verge compared Loki's time-slipping to the visual effects of the Spider-Verse films, and noted that the trailer gave a good overview of what the supporting TVA cast would be dealing with in the season. Pulliam-Moore also highlighted Loki's dialogue with Sylvie about being gods and believed Majors' role in the season would elicit a lot of discussion upon its release. Brad Lang at Comic Book Resources felt the trailer "promises another multiversal adventure" for the season with bigger stakes. The Hollywood Reporter's Aaron Couch felt Majors' inclusion in the trailer "answers a question about how Disney would market the show" amidst the actor's legal issues. Chris McPherson writing for Collider said it was "surprising" to see Majors featured in the trailer, while James Whitbrook at Gizmodo felt that the trailer had "smartly" minimized Majors' presence. Similarly, Screen Rant's Molly Freeman and Simon Gallagher had also felt Majors' minimal presence was appropriate, with the trailer instead focused on introducing the concept of time slipping. The trailer debuted to 80 million views, which was the most ever for a Disney+ series.

Additional footage was released on September 4, 2023, with Fay Watson from Total Film excited by the tease of a team-up between Loki and Sylvie. Footage from the first episode was shown at Disney's D23 event in early September 2023. Two episodes of the series Marvel Studios: Legends were released on September 29, 2023, exploring Variants and the TVA. A promotional poster for the series was noted for its potential use of generative AI. Various creatives noted the artifacts apparent in the poster, which can sometimes be left behind by AI-image generators. The background spiral clock image of the poster was noted for being similar to one available on Shutterstock that was not tagged as being AI-generated, though when the image was scanned by AI-image checkers, it was flagged as being AI-generated.

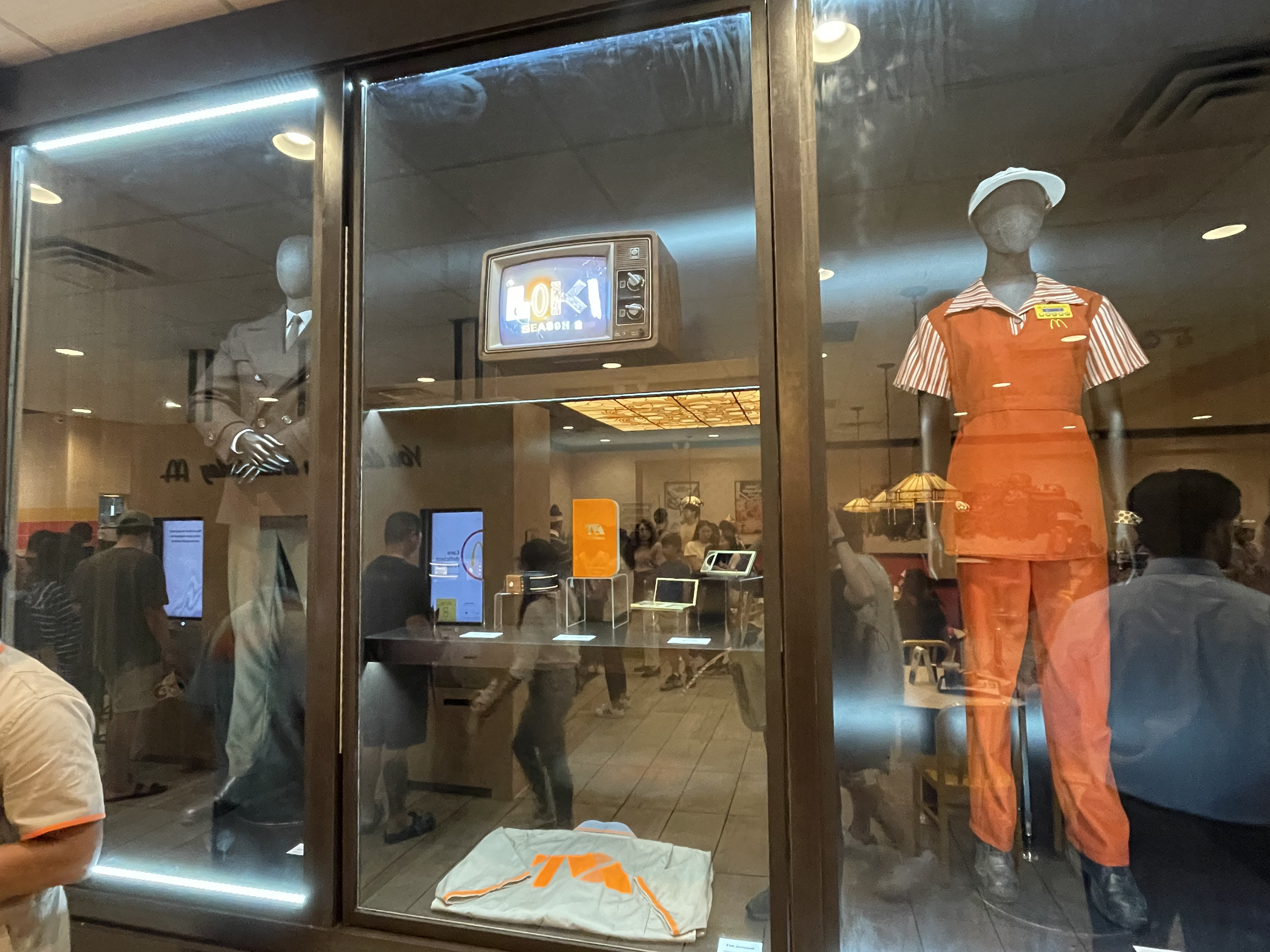
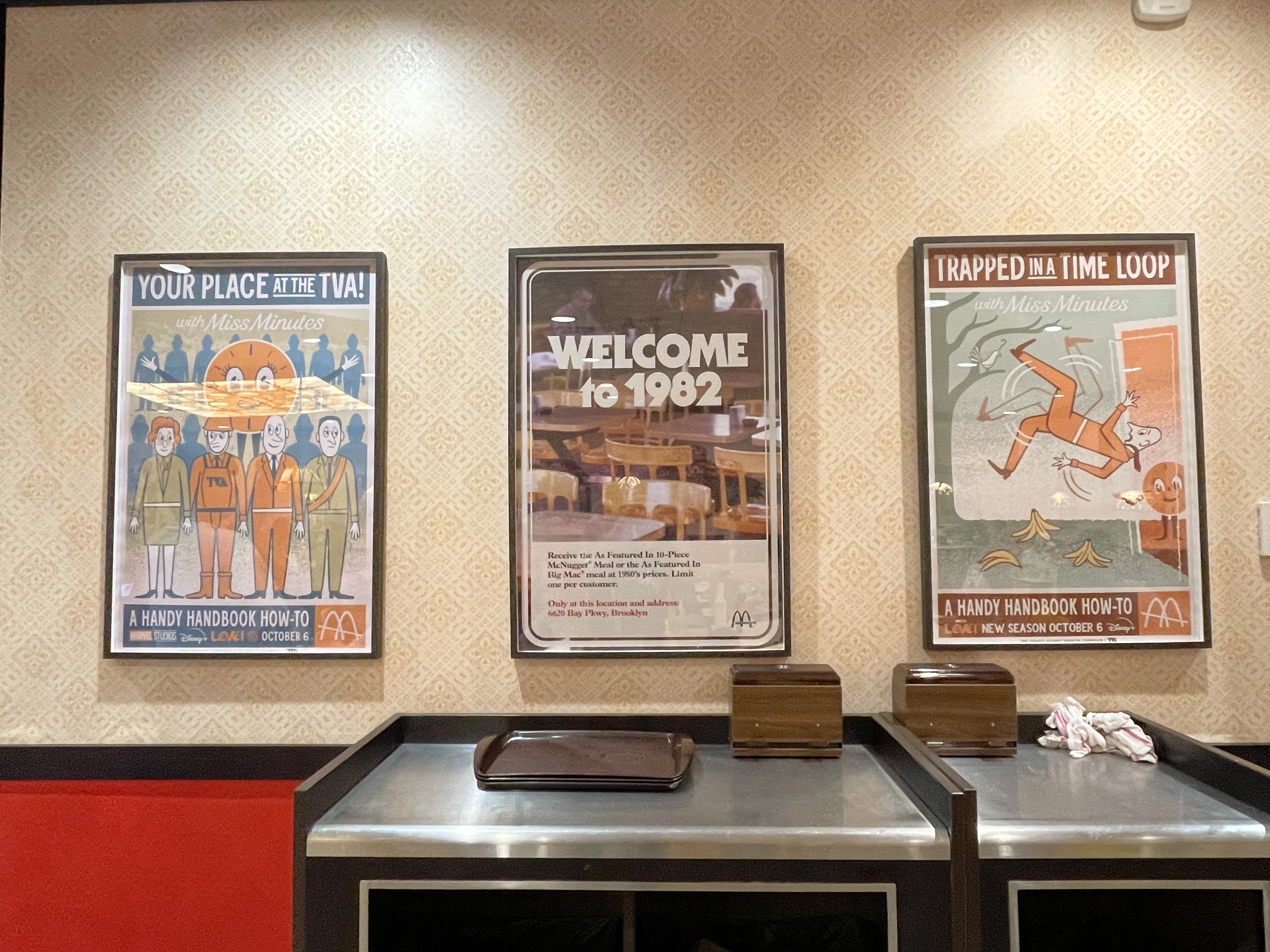
The Loki activation at McDonald's, featuring costumes and props from the season (top) and 1980s TVA posters (bottom)

External videos
- Travel back in time to 1982 with McDonalds and Marvel Studios' Loki Season 2, but watch out for the TVA! presents a look at the McDonald's restaurant activation, Instagram video from Loki (@officialloki) and McDonald's (@mcdonalds) profiles

In August 2023, McDonald's created new packaging for their sweet and sour dipping sauce, inspired by the season. This was part of their limited-edition "As Featured In" meal, which collected McDonald's menu items that were featured across various media. Though the campaign featured many other properties, Loki season two was what inspired the restaurant to pursue the campaign, and was considered the central focus of it. The restaurant released exclusive experiences, custom merchandise, and "never-before-seen content" related to the media that inspired the meal. For the second season of Loki, any customer who purchased the dipping sauce could scan the packaging on Snapchat for a themed augmented reality experience that offered exclusive sneak peeks at the season developed by Marvel Studios, with new content debuting weekly throughout the promotion. Footage from the season was featured in the trailer promoting the "As Featured In" meal. Additionally, McDonald's transformed one of their restaurants in Brooklyn, New York, to be 1982-themed as it appears in the season starting on August 30 for three days. The restaurant's employees were in period-accurate uniforms and it featured cheaper pricing for their "As Featured In" meal, meant to reflect food prices of the 1980s. The doorway was altered to mimic a TVA timedoor for patrons to "travel" back to 1982 upon entering the location while costumes and props from the season were showcased.

The series partnered with Randy's Donuts in Inglewood, California to offer Miss Minutes-themed donuts from September 6 until September 18, 2023, with the location's iconic donut on top of the building covered to look like Miss Minutes. On October 2, 2023, Miss Minutes was featured on the Navy Pier ferris wheel. Limited edition Lucky Charms cereal boxes were made available at Walmart on October 6, 2023, that featured a lenticular cover that alternated between the cereal's leprechaun mascot Lucky and Hiddleston's Loki; this continued the series' partnership with General Mills after working them previously for first season. Additional partnerships included a tie-in commercial with Samsung Electronics directed by Farahani that saw TVA agents hunting down Loki using a Samsung Galaxy S23 Ultra, Bones Coffee creating Loki-themed packaging for a Key lime pie-flavored coffee given the pie was a plot element for the season, and Citizen Watch making branded content with the series for their Axiom SC and Marvel x Citizen Loki watches. The "Marvel Must Haves" merchandise program for the season began on October 6. Following the premiere, Loki and O. B. were added to Avengers Campus.

== Release ==
=== Streaming ===
The second season debuted on Disney+ on October 5, 2023, at 9 p.m. Eastern Time, with subsequent episodes released weekly on Thursdays at that time. The season ran for six episodes, concluding on November 9. The season was originally scheduled to premiere on October 6 and release on Fridays at 3 a.m. Eastern Time, before moving to its Thursday release schedule following the similar, successful scheduling move for the Star Wars Disney+ series Ahsoka. A launch event for the season, which screened the first two episodes, occurred on October 2 at the El Capitan Theatre in Hollywood, Los Angeles, alongside events in various other cities in the United States. It is part of Phase Five of the MCU.

=== Home media ===
The second season of Loki was released on Ultra HD Blu-ray on December 3, 2024, with SteelBook packaging and concept art cards. Bonus features include "Loki Through Time"; deleted scenes; a gag reel; and the Marvel Studios: Assembled documentary special "The Making of Loki Season 2".

== Reception ==
=== Viewership ===
On October 9, 2023, Disney+ revealed that "Ouroboros" had 10.9 million views worldwide in its first three days of release. This was the second most-watched season premiere for the streaming service in 2023, behind the third season of The Mandalorian. Whip Media, which tracks viewership data for the more than 25 million worldwide users of its TV Time app, calculated that Loki was the most-streamed original series in the U.S. for the weeks of October 15, October 22, and October 29, 2023. JustWatch, a guide to streaming content with access to data from more than 20 million users around the world, estimated that Loki was the most watched television series across all platforms in the United States during the week of October 9–15, 2023.

Whip Media's TV Time also reported that Loki was the second most-watched streaming original television series of 2023. The file-sharing news website TorrentFreak announced that Loki was the third most-watched pirated television show of 2023. According to market research company Parrot Analytics, which looks at consumer engagement in consumer research, streaming, downloads, and on social media, Loki was the most in-demand superhero series of 2023.

=== Critical response ===
Loki season 2: Critical reception by episode
Season 2 (2023): Percentage of positive critics' reviews tracked by the website Rotten Tomatoes

The review aggregator website Rotten Tomatoes reports an 82% approval rating with an average rating of 7.35/10, based on 164 reviews. The critical consensus reads, "Loki's dizzying, dazzling second season may rely on sleight of hand to distract from its slightly less satisfying storyline, but the end result still contains enough of that old Marvel magic to entertain." Metacritic, which uses a weighted average, assigned a score of 65 out of 100 based on 23 critics, indicating "generally positive reviews".

Fran Ruiz of Space.com described the second season as a satisfying one, finding that the few issues that arise over the course of the season were successfully allayed by a conclusion she found to be bittersweet, emotional and logical at the same time. Similarly, Charles Pulliam-Moore of The Verge felt that though the season sometimes just seemed like setup for the next crossover event, the story successfully kept to the theme of "Loki finally discovering his true purpose"; the Loki felt concluded, even though the subplots were left open.

Jarrod Jones of IGN wrote that the season was a contemplative focus on the "core concepts" of Loki's character, with Loki helping his friends while trying not to act like a "megalomaniacal upstart god", and Gizmodo's Sabina Graves found that Loki finally completed his character arc of becoming a selfless hero; however, she felt that both Wumni Mosaku and Sophia DiMartio were underused, with the latter's character Sylvie having failed to evolve.

Therese Lacson of Collider wrote that Marvel made the season a success by unexpectedly focusing on Loki in actuality, instead of making the show a focus on Kang for crossovers; he described the season as one of Loki's character arc with a selfless act, portrayed beautifully by Hiddleston's "charismatic performance". The A.V. Club's William Hughes found the underlying theme of the two seasons of Loki to be "systems" of control that do not love their inhabitants, contrasting with Loki's system being loving of its inhabitants.

Vulture's Siddhant Adlakha criticized the season for making the choice "between determinism and free will", but only using it for subtext; he praised Natalie Holt's musical score as the only perfect positive of Loki across the two seasons. Similarly, Polygon's Joshua Rivera panned the season for wasting the potential of an amazing cast, a great visual and acoustic crew and creative freedom, producing a jumble of confusing plot lines, keeping its characters underdeveloped and underexplored.

=== Accolades ===
Accolades received by Loki, season two
Award	Date(s) of ceremony	Category	Recipient(s)	Result	Ref.
Hollywood Music in Media Awards	November 15, 2023	Score – TV Show/Limited Series	Natalie Holt	Nominated	
Critics' Choice Television Awards	January 14, 2024	Best Drama Series	Loki	Nominated	
Critics' Choice Television Awards	January 14, 2024	Best Actor in a Drama Series	Tom Hiddleston	Nominated	
Critics' Choice Television Awards	January 14, 2024	Best Supporting Actor in a Drama Series	Ke Huy Quan	Nominated	
Critics' Choice Television Awards	January 14, 2024	Best Supporting Actress in a Drama Series	Sophia Di Martino	Nominated	
Society of Composers & Lyricists	February 13, 2024	Outstanding Original Score for a Television Production	Natalie Holt	Nominated	
People's Choice Awards	February 18, 2024	Sci-Fi/Fantasy Show of the Year	Loki	Won	
People's Choice Awards	February 18, 2024	Male TV Star of the Year	Tom Hiddleston	Nominated	
Costume Designers Guild Awards	February 21, 2024	Excellence in Sci-Fi/Fantasy Television	Christine Wada (for "1893")	Nominated	
Costume Designers Guild Awards	February 21, 2024	Excellence in Costume Illustration	Felipe Sanchez (for "1893")	Nominated	
Art Directors Guild Awards	February 21, 2024	One-Hour Fantasy Single-Camera Series	Kasra Farahani (for "Ouroboros")	Nominated	
Visual Effects Society	February 21, 2024	Outstanding Visual Effects in a Photoreal Episode	Christopher Townsend, Allison Paul, Matthew Twyford, Christopher Smallfield and John William Van Der Pool (for "Glorious Purpose")	Nominated	
Visual Effects Society	February 21, 2024	Outstanding Created Environment in an Episode, Commercial, Game Cinematic or Real-Time Project	Christian Waite, Ben Aickin, Francesco Ferraresi, Pieter Warmington (for "1893")	Nominated	
Visual Effects Society	February 21, 2024	Outstanding Effects Simulations in an Episode, Commercial, Game Cinematic or Real-Time Project	Rafael Camacho, Jonathan Lyddon-Towl, Julien Legay, Benedikt Roettger (for "Science/Fiction")	Nominated	
MPSE Golden Reel Awards	March 3, 2024	Outstanding Achievement in Sound Editing – Broadcast Long Form Effects and Foley	Bjørn Ole Schroeder, David Chrastka, Andre Zweers, Malcolm Fife, Jamey Scott, Alyssa Nevarez, Dawit Zemene, Sandra Fox (for "Glorious Purpose")	Nominated	
MPSE Golden Reel Awards	March 3, 2024	Outstanding Achievement in Music Editing – Broadcast Long Form	Anele Onyekwere, Nashia Wachsman, Richard Armstrong, Ed Hamilton (for "Glorious Purpose")	Nominated	
BAFTA Television Craft Awards	April 28, 2024	Best Original Music: Fiction	Natalie Holt	Nominated	
Nickelodeon Kids' Choice Awards	July 13, 2024	Favorite Family TV Show	Loki	Nominated	
Nickelodeon Kids' Choice Awards	July 13, 2024	Favorite Male TV Star (Family)	Tom Hiddleston	Nominated	
Black Reel TV Awards	August 13, 2024	Outstanding Supporting Performance in a Drama Series	Gugu Mbatha-Raw	Nominated	
Black Reel TV Awards	August 13, 2024	Outstanding Supporting Performance in a Drama Series	Wunmi Mosaku	Nominated	
Primetime Creative Arts Emmy Awards	September 7–8, 2024	Outstanding Fantasy/Sci-Fi Costumes	Christine Wada, Harriet Kendall, Kristen Ernst-Brown, and Tom Hornsby (for "1893")	Nominated	
Primetime Creative Arts Emmy Awards	September 7–8, 2024	Outstanding Sound Mixing for a Comedy or Drama Series (One-Hour)	Karol Urban and Paul Munro (for "Glorious Purpose")	Nominated	
Primetime Creative Arts Emmy Awards	September 7–8, 2024	Outstanding Special Visual Effects in a Season or a Movie	Christopher Townsend, Allison Paul, Sandra Balej, Matthew Twyford, Christopher Smallfield, John William Van der pool, Steve Moncur, Julian Hutchens, and Kevin Yuille	Nominated	
Astra TV Awards	December 8, 2024	Best Streaming Drama Series	Loki	Nominated	
Astra TV Awards	December 8, 2024	Best Actor in a Streaming Drama Series	Tom Hiddleston	Nominated	
Astra TV Awards	December 8, 2024	Best Supporting Actor in a Streaming Drama Series	Ke Huy Quan	Nominated	
Astra TV Awards	December 8, 2024	Best Supporting Actor in a Streaming Drama Series	Owen Wilson	Nominated	
Astra TV Awards	December 8, 2024	Best Supporting Actress in a Streaming Drama Series	Gugu Mbatha-Raw	Nominated	
Astra TV Awards	December 8, 2024	Best Directing in a Streaming Drama Series	Justin Benson & Aaron Moorhead (for "Science/Fiction")	Nominated	
Astra TV Awards	December 8, 2024	Best Writing in a Streaming Drama Series	Eric Martin (for "Glorious Purpose")	Nominated	
Saturn Awards	February 2, 2025	Best Superhero Television Series	Loki	Nominated	
Saturn Awards	February 2, 2025	Best Guest Star in a Television Series	Ke Huy Quan	Nominated	

== Documentary special ==
In February 2021, the documentary series Marvel Studios: Assembled was announced. The special on this season, "The Making of Loki: Season 2", was released on Disney+ on November 22, 2023.
