= Loki (Marvel Cinematic Universe) =

Character in the Marvel Cinematic Universe

- Marvel Cinematic Universe character
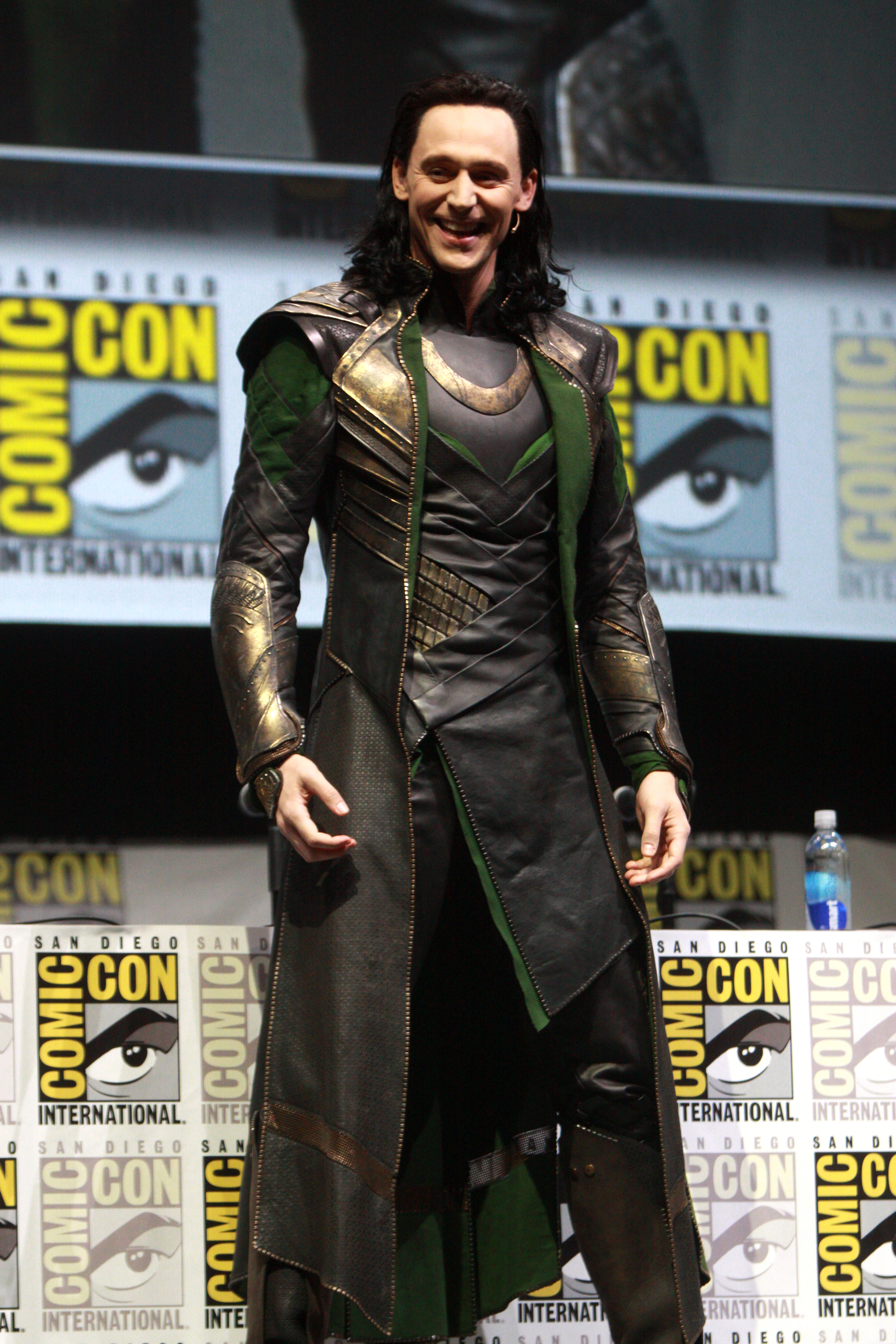
- Tom Hiddleston as Loki at the 2013 San Diego Comic-Con
- First appearance: Original: Thor (2011); Alternate: Avengers: Endgame (2019)
- Last appearance: Original: Avengers: Infinity War (2018)
- Based on: Loki by: Stan Lee; Larry Lieber; Jack Kirby
- Adapted by: Kenneth Branagh; Alan Taylor; Taika Waititi; Ashley Miller; Zack Stentz; Don Payne; J. Michael Straczynski; Mark Protosevich; Joss Whedon; Zak Penn; Christopher Markus and Stephen McFeely; Christopher Yost; Craig Kyle; Michael Waldron
- Portrayed by: Tom Hiddleston; Ted Allpress (young; Thor)

In-universe information
- Full name: Loki Laufeyson
- Aliases: Loki Odinson; Dan B. Cooper; Variant L1130 (2012 variant)
- Species: Jotunn (Frost Giant)
- Titles: God of Time; God of Stories; God of Mischief; God of Multiverse; Prince of Asgard; King of Asgard; King of Jotunheim
- Affiliation: Frost Giants; Chitauri; Revengers; Time Variance Authority (2012 variant)
- Weapon: Daggers and throwing knives; Casket of Ancient Winters; Gungnir; Scepter (Mind Stone); Tesseract (Space Stone)
- Family: Laufey (father); Odin (adoptive father); Frigga (adoptive mother); Hela (adoptive sister); Thor (adoptive brother)
- Significant other: Sylvie (2012 variant)
- Origin: Jotunheim
- Nationality: Asgardian

Loki Laufeyson, later known through adoption as Loki Odinson, is a character portrayed by Tom Hiddleston in the Marvel Cinematic Universe (MCU) media franchise, based on the Marvel Comics character and Norse mythological deity of the same name. He is depicted as the God of Mischief and initially nemesis to his adopted brother, Thor.

Raised as a master of Asgardian magic and sorcery, Loki plots to take the Asgardian throne from Thor. After that fails, he attempts to conquer Earth, inadvertently driving the formation of the Avengers, but is imprisoned in Asgard. He briefly replaces his adoptive father, Odin, as Asgard's ruler, then turns antihero and helps his brother save the planet from their sister Hela, before being killed by Thanos. An alternate version of Loki from 2012 is recruited by the Time Variance Authority (TVA) and encounters other versions of himself, including a female version named Sylvie, with whom he falls in love. They work together with TVA members Mobius, Hunter B-15 and Ouroboros to stop He Who Remains. The alternate version of Loki later sacrifices himself to watch over and maintain the multiverse.

As of 2024, Loki has become a staple in the MCU appearing in seven films, beginning with Thor (2011). Alternate versions of the character starred in the Disney+ television series Loki (2021–2023) and appeared in What If...? (2021–2024). He is considered a fan-favorite character in the franchise; Hiddleston's performance has received critical acclaim from critics and audiences.

== Concept and creation ==
Live-action film adaptations of characters in the Thor comic books were proposed at various times but did not come to fruition. In the mid-2000s, Kevin Feige realized that Marvel still owned the rights to the core members of the Avengers, which included Thor. Feige, a self-professed "fanboy", envisioned creating a shared universe just as creators Stan Lee and Jack Kirby had done with their comic books in the early 1960s. In 2006, the film was announced as a Marvel Studios production. In December 2007, Protosevich described his plans for it "to be like a superhero origin story, but not one about a human gaining superpower, but of a god realizing his true potential. It's the story of an Old Testament God who becomes a New Testament God". In 2008, Guillermo del Toro entered talks to direct the film. Del Toro was a fan of Jack Kirby's work on the comics, and said that he loved the character of Loki, but wished to incorporate more of the original Norse mythology into the film, including a "really dingy Valhalla, [with] Vikings and mud". However, del Toro ultimately turned down Thor to direct The Hobbit. Kenneth Branagh entered into negotiations to direct, and by December 2008, Branagh confirmed that he had been hired. He described it as "a human story right in the center of a big epic scenario."

Several actors were reportedly considered for the part, including Josh Hartnett, and Jim Carrey. In May 2009, Marvel announced that Tom Hiddleston, who had worked with Branagh before and had initially been considered to portray the lead role, had been cast as Loki. In June 2009, Feige confirmed that both Chris Hemsworth and Hiddleston had signed on.

=== Characterization ===
Tom Hiddleston stated that "Loki's like a comic book version of Edmund in King Lear, but nastier". Hiddleston stated that he had to keep a strict diet before the start of filming because director Kenneth Branagh "wants Loki to have a lean and hungry look, like Cassius in Julius Caesar. Physically, he can't be posing as Thor". Hiddleston also looked at Peter O'Toole as inspiration for Loki, explaining, "Interestingly enough, Kenneth said to look at Peter O'Toole in two specific films, The Lion in Winter and Lawrence of Arabia. What's interesting about ... his performance [as King Henry] is you see how damaged he is. There's a rawness [to his performance]; it's almost as if he's living with a layer of skin peeled away. He's grandiose and teary and, in a moment, by turns hilarious and then terrifying. What we wanted was that emotional volatility. It's a different acting style, it's not quite the same thing, but it's fascinating to go back and watch an actor as great as O'Toole head for those great high hills". Ted Allpress portrays a young Loki.

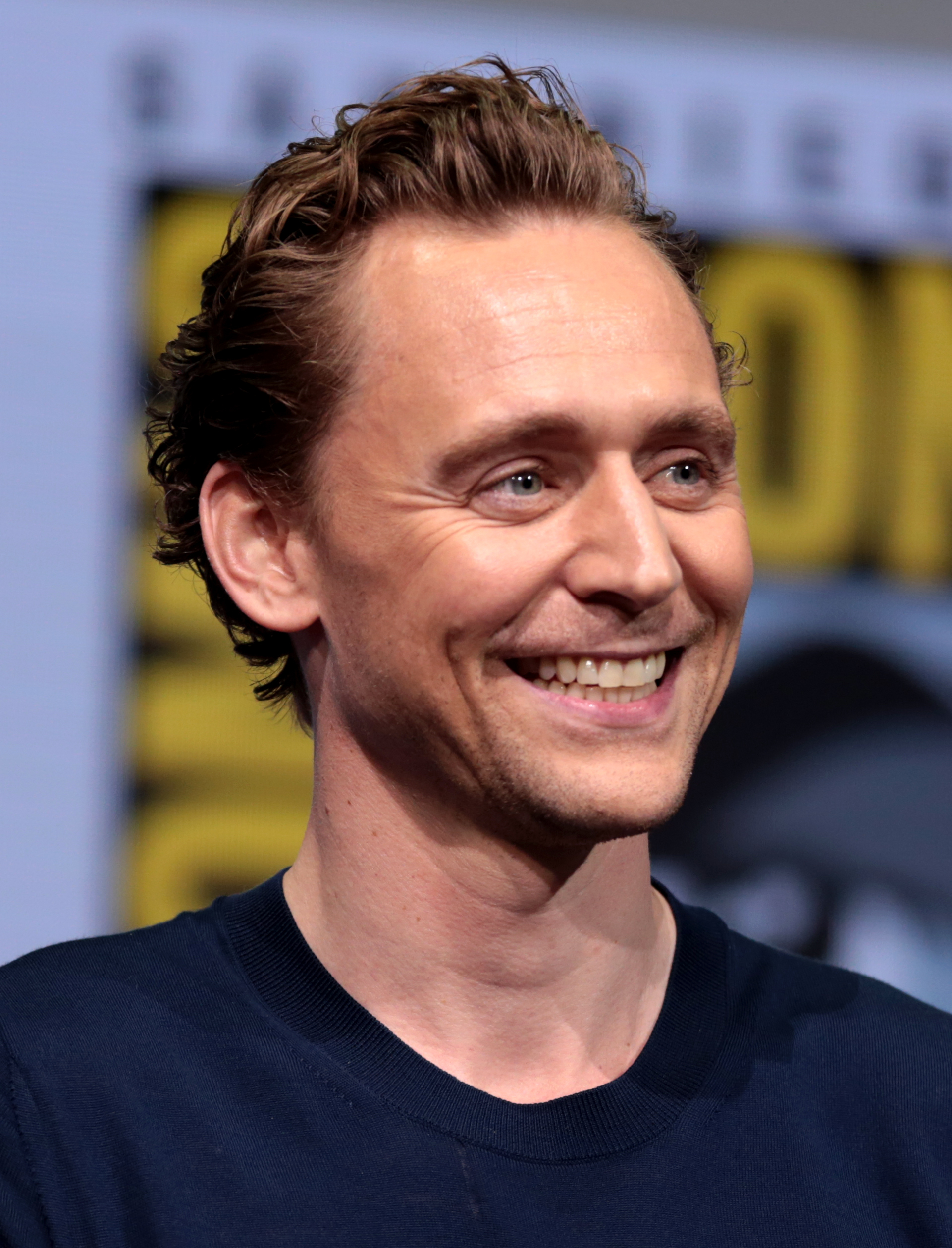
Hiddleston promoting Avengers: Infinity War at the 2017 San Diego Comic-Con

About his character's evolution from Thor to The Avengers, Hiddleston said, "I think the Loki we see in The Avengers is further advanced. You have to ask yourself the question: How pleasant an experience is it disappearing into a wormhole that has been created by some kind of super nuclear explosion of his own making? So I think by the time Loki shows up in The Avengers, he's seen a few things." About Loki's motivations, Hiddleston said, "At the beginning of The Avengers, he comes to Earth to subjugate it and his idea is to rule the human race as their king. And like all the delusional autocrats of human history, he thinks this is a great idea because if everyone is busy worshipping him, there will be no wars so he will create some kind of world peace by ruling them as a tyrant. But he is also kind of deluded in the fact that he thinks unlimited power will give him self-respect, so I haven't let go of the fact that he is still motivated by this terrible jealousy and kind of spiritual desolation." Hiddleston also filmed scenes for Avengers: Age of Ultron, but his scenes were omitted from the theatrical cut because director Joss Whedon didn't want the movie to feel "overstuffed".

In Thor: The Dark World, Loki forms an uneasy alliance with Thor against the Dark Elves. On where he wished to take the character in the film, Hiddleston said, "I'd like to take [Loki] to his absolute rock bottom. I'd like to see him yield, essentially, to his darkest instincts. Then, having hit rock bottom, maybe come back up. I think the fascination for me about playing Loki is that, in the history of the mythology and the comic books and the Scandinavian myths, is he's constantly dancing on this fault line of the dark side and redemption." Hiddleston recalled, "When I met Alan [Taylor], he asked me how I thought I could do Loki again without repeating myself and I remembered talking with Kevin Feige when we were on the Avengers promotional tour. I said, 'OK, you've seen Thor and Loki be antagonistic for two films now. It would be amazing to see them fight side by side. I've been the bad guy now twice, so I can't be again, or otherwise I shouldn't be in the film. So we have to find a new role for me to play."

Hiddleston was interested in how Loki's attitude has changed by the events of Thor: Ragnarok, saying, "he is always a trickster. It is trying to find new ways for him to be mischievous". As the ruler of Asgard since the end of Thor: The Dark World (2013), Hiddleston notes that "Loki has devoted most of his efforts to narcissistic self-glorification. Not so much on good governance." He also added that "the idea that Thor might be indifferent to Loki is troubling for him... it's an interesting development".

With respect to Loki's death at the beginning of Infinity War, Hiddleston expressed the opinion that "it's very powerful he calls himself an Odinson, and that closes the whole journey of Loki and what he can do", also noting that Loki's death demonstrates how powerful Thanos is, setting the stage for the fight against him.

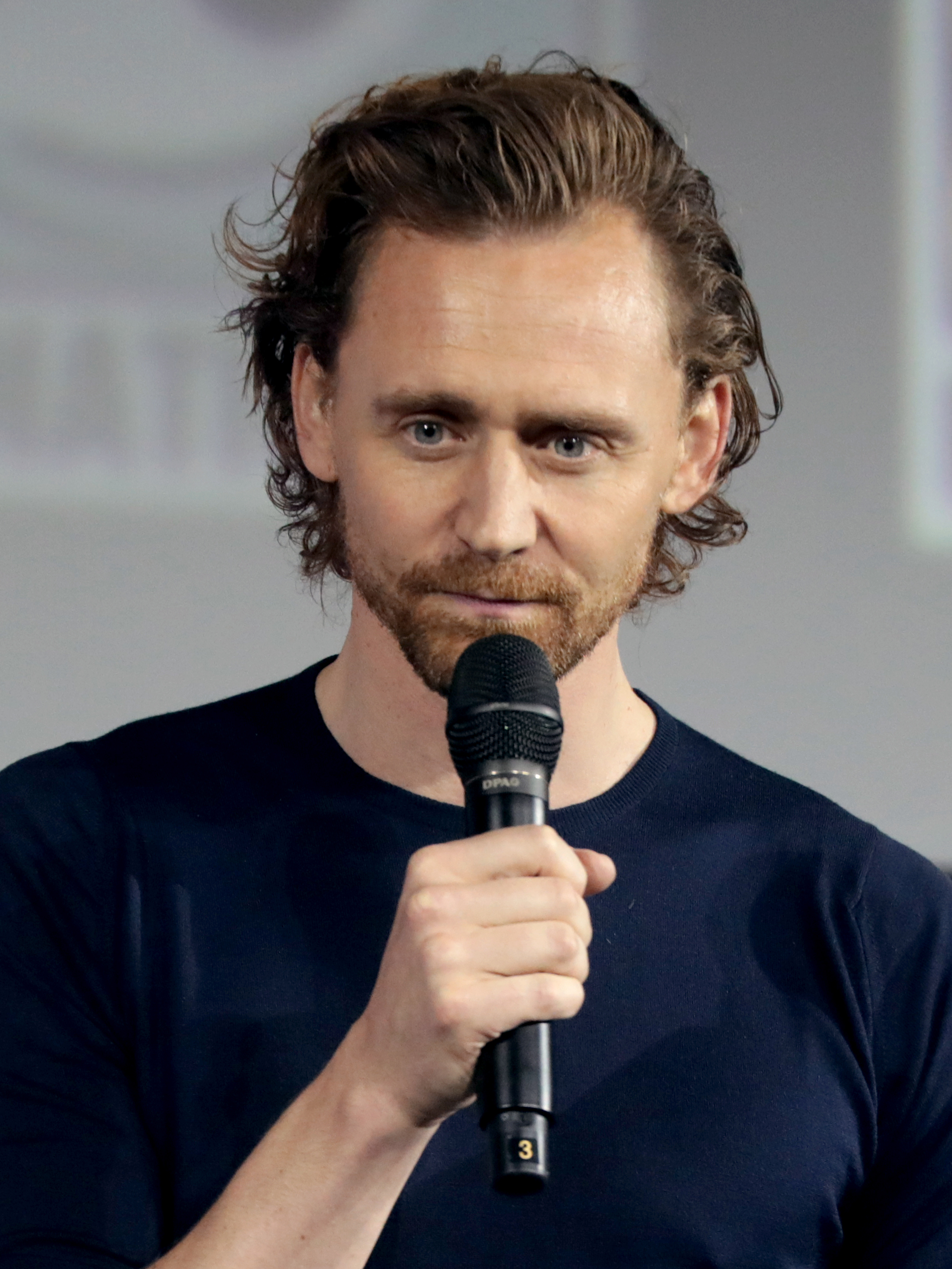
Hiddleston promoting Loki at the 2019 San Diego Comic-Con.

In Loki (2021), Loki's sex in the series is denoted by the Time Variance Authority as "fluid", in a nod to the character's genderfluidity in Marvel Comics. Hiddleston said that the "breadth and range of identity contained in the character has been emphasized and is something I was always aware of when I was first cast 10 years ago...I know it was important to Kate Herron and Michael Waldron and to the whole team. And we were very aware, this is something we felt responsible for."

The character also appears in the animated series What If...? (2021-2024), and the animated short film The Good, the Bart, and the Loki (2021).

=== Appearance and special effects ===
Hiddleston has noted that his transformation into Loki has required dyeing his naturally blond hair and making his naturally ruddy skin appear very pale, stating:

In making him with this raven black hair and blanching my face of all color, it changes my features. Suddenly my blue eyes look a lot bluer, which lends a severity to my face. And even my own smile has a distorted menace to it. Whatever comes through me naturally is distorted.

Loki's costume in Thor, designed by Marvel's head of visual development Charlie Wen, adapted elements from the comics while adding elements to give it a futuristic feel, reflecting the treatment of magic in the Thor films as merely highly advanced technology. Like other representations of Asgard, particularly including the costumes of Thor and Odin, it also referenced Norse symbols. Wen stated that he "designed Loki's armor to be more overtly ceremonial than practical", in keeping with the character being more focused on scheming for power than engaging in battle.

Hiddleston described the horns worn as part of his Loki costume as weighing about 30 pounds, resulting in one instance during the filming of The Avengers where he asked co-star Chris Hemsworth to really punch him in the face, because the weight of the horns made it difficult to fake being hit.

During the Loki TV series, numerous Loki variants were shown or introduced with varying appearances. With respect to the most prominently featured variant, Sylvie, Loki costume designer Christine Wada and director Kate Herron planned Sylvie to be "mysterious and somewhat androgynous" in the beginning, avoiding her identity reveal to become "a total play on gender", rather, letting the character evolve on her own "as a strong female lead" without over-sexualization. Sylvie's look represents a character that is "a fighter", can stand on her own, and is prepared to engage in battles and runs. Instead of tailor-made armors usually given to female comic book characters to enhance silhouettes, the costume designer intended to not make distinctions between the male and female clothing in the series. Sylvie's costume include a harem drop-crotch pant, which allowed her to emphasize movement equally to a tight pant or a spandex suit. Wada decided to bring that grounded aspect to Sylvie's look into a storyline with magic elements, stating that "I believe it more that somebody can go fight when they're in a rugged boot more than a pair of high heels... function is such a clear and important thing to reference in all good design." In her first appearance, Sylvie wore a broken Loki crown, which she later left behind in the Ark. A version of the character, Lady Loki, wore a similar crown in the comics. Another variant, Classic Loki, wore a costume inspired by the character's 1960s comic design by Jack Kirby.

== Fictional character biography ==
=== Early life ===
Loki was born a Frost Giant and abandoned as an infant by his father Laufey, only to be found by Odin during an invasion of the realm of the Frost Giants in Jotunheim. Odin used magic to change Loki to look like an Asgardian and raised him as a son alongside Odin's biological son, Thor. During his upbringing, Odin's wife Frigga taught Loki how to use his magic.

He used these powers throughout his life, constantly tricking his adoptive brother Thor, as well as pulling a heist on Earth under the alias D. B. Cooper. He was embittered throughout his upbringing, perceiving that he was neglected by Odin in favor of Thor, and thus grew closer to his adoptive mother Frigga instead.

=== Betrayal of Asgard ===
Hundreds of years later, in 2011, Loki watches as Thor prepares to ascend to the throne of Asgard. This is interrupted by Frost Giants, allowed in to Asgard by Loki, attempting to retrieve an artifact called the Casket, which was captured by Odin in a war centuries before. Loki then manipulates Thor into traveling to Jotunheim against Odin's order to confront Laufey, the Frost Giant leader. A battle ensues until Odin intervenes to save the Asgardians, destroying the fragile truce between the two races. Loki discovers that he is Laufey's biological son, adopted by Odin after the war ended. After Odin exiles Thor to Earth, Loki confronts Odin about his parentage, and a weary Odin falls into the deep "Odinsleep" to recover his strength. Loki takes the throne in Odin's stead and offers Laufey the chance to kill Odin and retrieve the Casket. Sif and the Warriors Three, unhappy with Loki, attempt to return Thor from exile, convincing Heimdall, gatekeeper of the Bifröst—the means of traveling between worlds—to allow them passage to Earth. Aware of their plan, Loki sends the Destroyer, a seemingly indestructible automaton, to pursue them and kill Thor. The Destroyer leaves Thor on the verge of death but his sacrifice sees him become worthy of returning from exile and he regains his powers and defeats the Destroyer. Afterward, Thor leaves with his fellow Asgardians to confront Loki. In Asgard, Loki betrays and kills Laufey, revealing his true plan to use Laufey's attempt on Odin's life as an excuse to destroy Jotunheim with the Bifröst, thus proving himself worthy to Odin. Thor arrives and fights Loki before destroying the Bifröst to stop Loki's plan, stranding himself in Asgard. Odin awakens and prevents the brothers from falling into the abyss created in the wake of the bridge's destruction, but after Odin rejects Loki's pleas for approval, Loki allows himself to fall into the abyss.

In space, Loki encounters the Other, the leader of an extraterrestrial race known as the Chitauri. In exchange for retrieving the Tesseract, (Note: Producer Kevin Feige stated that the Tesseract is based on the Cosmic Cube from Marvel comics. After Thor: The Dark World, he stated that it also held the Space Infinity Stone.) a powerful energy source of unknown potential, the Other promises Loki an army with which he can subjugate Earth. Later, Erik Selvig is taken to a S.H.I.E.L.D. facility, where Nick Fury opens a briefcase and asks him to study a mysterious cube. Loki, invisible, prompts Selvig to agree, and he does.

=== Invasion of New York ===
In 2012, Loki attacks a remote S.H.I.E.L.D. research facility, using a scepter that controls people's minds and which, unknown to him, amplifies his hatred for Thor and the inhabitants of Earth. He uses the scepter to brainwash Clint Barton and Dr. Erik Selvig, and steals the Tesseract. In Stuttgart, Barton steals iridium needed to stabilize the Tesseract's power while Loki causes a distraction, leading to a brief confrontation with Steve Rogers, Tony Stark, and Natasha Romanoff that ends with Loki allowing himself to get captured. While Loki is being escorted to S.H.I.E.L.D. on the Quinjet, Thor arrives and takes him away, hoping to convince him to abandon his plan. Thor eventually takes Loki to S.H.I.E.L.D.'s flying aircraft carrier, the Helicarrier. Upon arrival, Loki is imprisoned while Bruce Banner and Stark attempt to locate the Tesseract. Agents possessed by Loki attack the Helicarrier, disabling one of its engines in flight and causing Banner to transform into the Hulk. Thor attempts to stop the Hulk's rampage, and Loki kills the agent Phil Coulson and ejects Thor from the Helicarrier as he escapes. Loki uses the Tesseract, in conjunction with a device Selvig built, to open a wormhole above Stark Tower in New York City to the Chitauri fleet in space, launching his invasion. The Avengers arrive and rally in defense of the city. As the Chitauri are ultimately defeated, the Hulk attacks Loki and beats him into submission in the Tower, before Loki is arrested and taken to Asgard.

=== Battle with the Dark Elves ===
In 2013, Dark Elves led by Malekith attack Asgard, searching for Jane Foster, whose body has been invaded by an unearthly force known as the Aether. Malekith and his monstrous lieutenant Kurse kill Loki's adoptive mother Frigga, who had taught Loki magic. Thor reluctantly frees Loki, who agrees to take Thor to a secret portal to Svartalfheim, home of the dark elves, in return for Thor's promise to take vengeance for their mother. In Svartalfheim, Loki appears to betray Thor, in fact tricking Malekith into drawing the Aether out of Jane, but Thor's attempt to destroy the exposed substance fails. Malekith merges with the Aether and leaves in his ship as Loki appears to be fatally wounded saving Thor from Kurse, whom Loki was able to kill through trickery. Thor ultimately defeats Malekith in a battle in Greenwich, and returns to Asgard to decline Odin's offer to take the throne, and tells Odin of Loki's sacrifice. After Thor leaves, it is shown that Loki has actually survived and taken Odin's place on the throne, disguised as Odin, having kept the real Odin under a spell on Earth. During this time, the disguised Loki sends Sif to Earth on a mission and later banishes her from Asgard.

=== Destruction of Asgard and death ===
In 2017, Thor returns to Asgard and discovers Loki's ruse, making Loki reveal himself to the shocked Asgardians. After Loki tells Thor where Odin is, he is taken by Thor back to Earth to New York City. Loki is trapped through a portal by Stephen Strange as a threat to Earth, before being dropped out of the portal into the New York Sanctum. He and Thor are then sent into another portal to Norway, where they find a dying Odin, who explains that his passing will allow his firstborn child, Hela, to escape from a prison she was sealed in long ago. Hela appears, destroying Mjölnir to Loki's shock, and forces an escaping Thor and Loki from the Bifröst out into space. Loki lands on the planet Sakaar, and quickly ingratiates himself to the ruler of that world, the Grandmaster. Thor later crash-lands on Sakaar and is captured by the slave trader Valkyrie, a former member of the ancient order of Valkyries defeated by Hela. After convincing Valkyrie and Loki to help, they steal a ship with which to escape through a wormhole to Asgard – but not before Loki again attempts to betray Thor, causing Thor to leave Loki behind on Sakaar. However, Loki is found by Korg, Miek, and others who join him aboard a large vessel stolen from the Grandmaster called the Statesman. He leads them to return to Asgard and help the Asgardians escape the battle between Thor and Hela's forces, proclaiming himself their savior in the process. During the battle, on Thor's order, Loki goes to Odin's treasure room and places the crown of Surtur in the eternal flame kept there, thus causing an enormous form of Surtur to appear and destroy Hela and Asgard. In the process of doing so however, he steals the Tesseract from Odin's treasure vault. Thor, crowned king, decides to take the Asgardians to Earth despite Loki's concerns about how he will be received there.

While en-route to Earth, in 2018, Loki and Thor are intercepted by a large spacecraft, the Sanctuary II, carrying Thanos and his adopted children, alerted to their location by the presence of the Tesseract secretly being held by Loki. After wiping out half of the Asgardians onboard while the rest flee via escape pods, Thanos, wielding the Power Stone, overpowers Thor and Hulk, kills Heimdall, and claims the Space Stone from the Tesseract that Loki hands over to him in order to spare Thor's life. In a last act of self-sacrifice, Loki pretends to swear allegiance to Thanos, only to attempt to stab his throat. Thanos intercepts the attack with the Space Stone and kills Loki by snapping his neck, leaving his body to be cradled in Thor's arms as their ship explodes.

=== 2012 variant ===
==== Capture and learning his original fate ====
A variant of Loki, dubbed Variant L1130, is subdued by the Avengers at Stark Tower following the Battle of New York. He is taken into custody by Thor and Stark but they get stopped by Alexander Pierce and other agents at the Tower's entrance. Loki witnesses Stark going into cardiac arrest and sees Ant-Man kicking the briefcase containing the Tesseract to another Tony Stark. However, the briefcase gets knocked over by Hulk and lands at Loki's feet. Loki takes the Tesseract and escapes into a wormhole.

The wormhole drops Loki off in Mongolia and he is taken into custody by the Time Variance Authority (TVA), while the new timeline is reset and destroyed.

Loki is taken through a Timedoor into the TVA headquarters. He is taken into the TVA court room where TVA judge Ravonna Renslayer labels him a rogue variant to be "reset", despite Loki saying that they should talk to the Avengers instead. He is told what they did was supposed to happen. TVA agent Mobius M. Mobius intervenes and takes Loki to a Time Theatre where he reviews Loki's past misdeeds and questions his real motive for hurting people. After Mobius leaves the room, Loki escapes and learns that the Infinity Stones are powerless in the TVA, as they are being used as paperweights. He returns to the Time Theatre and views his main 616 counterpart's life, such as his relationship with Thor and death at the hands of Thanos. After seeing this, Loki agrees to help Mobius stop another variant of himself.

==== Working with the Time Variance Authority ====
Loki goes with a TVA unit to 1985 Oshkosh, Wisconsin to look for the variant. Loki stalls for time, but Mobius understands his plan. After some research, Loki proposes that the variant is hiding near apocalyptic events like Asgard's Ragnarök, where the impending destruction means their actions cannot change the timeline, thus concealing them from the TVA. Loki and Mobius confirm this possibility by visiting Pompeii in 79 AD. Travelling to 2050 Alabama, Loki meets the variant, who rejects Loki's offer to work together to overthrow the Time-Keepers, before revealing herself as a female variant. The variant then uses TVA Reset Charges to "bomb" the timeline, creating new timeline branches to keep the TVA's Minutemen busy, before escaping through a Timedoor, with Loki in pursuit.

==== Allying with Sylvie ====
Loki and Sylvie engage in a confrontation at the TVA headquarters, but him using her TemPad teleports them both to Lamentis-1, a planet set to be destroyed by a meteor shower. However, their TemPad runs out of power stranding them. Agreeing to ally with one another, the variant introduces herself as "Sylvie" using an alias and proposes a truce in order to escape the planet. The pair sneak aboard a train bound for the Ark, a spaceship intended to evacuate Lamentis-1, in order to siphon its power and recharge the TemPad. On the train, Loki gets drunk and starts a ruckus, causing him and Sylvie to be discovered and forced out by the guards. While walking to the Ark in order to instead hijack it and leave the planet, to prevent it from being destroyed as according to the Sacred Timeline, Loki enquires about Sylvie's enchantment ability, learning that the TVA are all variants themselves; Loki reveals to Sylvie that the TVA agents, including Mobius, are not aware that they are variants. They fight their way through the guards and through a meteor shower to the Ark, only to witness it being destroyed by a meteor just as they get to it, leaving them stranded again.

Loki is told by Sylvie how she escaped the TVA when she was about to be arrested as a child. Loki and Sylvie form a romantic bond, creating a nexus event, that alerts the TVA. Mobius rescues them from Lamentis-1 and has them both arrested, punishing Loki by leaving him in a time loop from his past. After Mobius derides Loki for having fallen in love with Sylvie, Loki tells him that everyone working for the TVA are variants, which Mobius investigates. Now aware of his background upon finding proof, Mobius frees Loki from the loop, but is soon confronted by Renslayer and pruned. Loki and Sylvie are taken to the Time-Keepers, accompanied by Renslayer and her minutemen. B-15 intervenes, freeing Loki and Sylvie of their time twisting collars, and in the ensuing fight, the minutemen are killed whilst Renslayer is knocked unconscious by Sylvie. Sylvie then beheads one of the Time-Keepers, who turn out to all be androids. Loki prepares to tell Sylvie about his feelings, but Renslayer regains consciousness and prunes him.

He awakens in a barren wasteland, dubbed the Void at the end of time, and is met by other variants of himself.

==== Surviving in the Void and meeting He Who Remains ====
Loki and the other variants, Kid Loki, Classic Loki, Boastful Loki, and Alligator Loki, are chased by Alioth, a universe-devouring cloud-storm entity. They pass several pruned objects such as a Yellowjacket helmet and the Thanos-Copter and escape into Kid-Loki's underground tunnel. Loki is introduced to them and told that Alioth acts as a pet that protects the Void and devours anything that gets sent there. Loki is told by each of them their respective reasons for getting sent there. Loki decides to leave, but gets stopped from doing so by President Loki and other variants who barge into the tunnel. Boastful Loki reveals that he betrayed them on behalf of President Loki, causing a fight to ensue between them, while Classic Loki creates a portal for Loki, Kid Loki, and Alligator Loki to escape through. In the distance, they witness a U.S. Navy ship arriving and Alioth subsequently devouring the sailors. Loki then is reunited with Mobius and Sylvie, who drive up in a car. Sylvie proposes a plan to enchant Alioth, whilst Mobius leaves through a Timedoor. Kid Loki and Alligator Loki leave them while Classic Loki creates a large illusion of Asgard to distract Alioth and sacrifices himself in the process. This allows Loki and Sylvie to successfully enchant Alioth and see a rift opened, revealing the Citadel at the End of Time in the foreground, and walk towards it.

Loki and Sylvie approach the Citadel and walk inside after the doors open. They encounter Miss Minutes and reject an offer from her creator, "He Who Remains", to return them to the timeline with everything they desire. She leaves them and they continue walking through the Citadel until an elevator door opens and they meet He Who Remains. He invites them to his office and tells them about the multiversal war caused by his infinite variants, taming Alioth to end the war, isolating a collection of universes that had no variant of his existing called the "Sacred Timeline", and creating the TVA. As the timeline begins to branch, he offers them a choice: kill him and expose the timeline to the multiverse, creating another multiversal war, or become his successors in overseeing the TVA. Loki believes his warnings and pleads with Sylvie to listen to reason after she tries to kill him. They kiss, but Sylvie uses He Who Remains' TemPad and sends Loki back to TVA headquarters. A defeated Loki warns B-15 and Mobius about the variants of He Who Remains, but they do not recognize him. To his horror, Loki sees that a statue in the likeness of He Who Remains has replaced those of the Time-Keepers.

==== Time Slipping throughout the TVA ====
Back at the TVA, Loki discovers that he is uncontrollably warping across time. In the past, Loki is chased by Mobius and the TVA Minutemen. In the present, Loki reunites with Mobius and warns him and B-15 of the threat of He Who Remains' variants, telling them that He Who Remains created the TVA. Loki and Mobius go to meet TVA technician Ouroboros "O. B.", who deduces that Loki is "time slipping", a phenomenon possibly caused by the instability of the timeline branches caused by He Who Remains' death. Loki slips to a point 400 years in the past in the same place, where he instructs O. B. to build a Temporal Aura Extractor device to stop Loki's time slipping. In the present, O. B. suddenly remembers that he has been holding onto the device for centuries, and instructs Mobius to approach the Temporal Loom with it to extract Loki from the time stream as Loki prunes himself. Loki time slips to the future, where he briefly encounters Sylvie opening an elevator before he is pruned at the last possible second. Mobius successfully pulls Loki from the time stream, and the two of them set out to find Sylvie. While in the future, Loki also witnesses the Temporal Loom going critical, forcing the evacuation of the TVA. In the present, Loki, O. B. and Mobius witness the beginning of this meltdown which O. B. begins working to stop.

==== Fixing the Temporal Loom ====
Loki, Mobius, and B-15 go to 1977 London on Earth-616 and locate Brad Wolfe. They bring him back to the TVA and get him to tell them where Sylvie is. They find her in a branched universe's 1982 Broxton, Oklahoma working at McDonalds and Loki tries to get her to come back to them, but she refuses until Wolfe warns them they are in danger of TVA general Dox's plans of pruning the new branches. They locate Dox and her Minutemen, stopping them and taking them into custody, although most of her plan had succeeded.

Loki, terrified by the thought of He Who Remains' variants, convinces Mobius to find where the variants may be. They track Renslayer's TemPad and travel to the 1893 Chicago World's Fair. There, they see a He Who Remains' variant, Victor Timely, presenting his Temporal Loom prototype. (Note: Also depicted in the post-credits scene of Ant-Man and the Wasp: Quantumania (2023)) Timely flees as four groups chase him: Loki and Mobius, who want to bring him back to the TVA to use his aura to fix the Loom; Renslayer and Miss Minutes, who want him to take his variant's place with them at his side; Sylvie, who wants to kill him; and a robber baron and his allies wanting revenge against Timely's fake invention scam. Loki, Mobius, Renslayer, and Sylvie find Timely at his Wisconsin laboratory. Sylvie relents from killing Timely and allows Loki to take Timely back to the TVA.

As the Temporal Loom reaches critical, Loki and his friends attempt to fix it, but are blocked by Miss Minutes. In the midst of the group's attempts to fix the Loom, Loki encountered his time slipping past self and pruned his past self, realizing that it was actually he himself who had done it during his earlier adventure. After O. B. takes Miss Minutes off-line, Sylvie is able to enchant Wolfe into pruning Renslayer, but the temporal radiation spaghettifies Timely before he can place the Throughput Multiplier in the Loom. The Temporal Loom explodes and Loki is caught in the blast wave as it engulfs the TVA.

==== Forming Yggdrasil and beyond ====
Having survived the explosion, Loki finds himself in the abandoned TVA and begins time slipping once again, barely escaping as the TVA disintegrates. Loki's time slipping takes him to the branched timelines where his friends Mobius, Hunter B-15, Casey and O. B. have been reset to their previous lives as Don, Dr. Verity Willis, Frank Morris and Dr. A.D. Doug respectively. Of the group, only Doug believes Loki and, since Loki can't control his time slipping, proposes a plan to bring together the group that was present at the explosion to use their collective temporal aura to determine the coordinates that Loki needs to travel back in time to. Although Loki manages to collect the others, Sylvie, who retains her memories as well, is uninterested in helping and gets Loki to admit that his true motivation is a fear of losing his friends and being alone. Sylvie encourages Loki to write his own story like everyone else, but before he can send everyone home, Sylvie appears with the news that her branched timeline died and faded away. She and the group fade away as well, with Loki finally figuring out how to control his time slipping by focusing on a person rather than an event. Declaring that he can "rewrite the story," Loki successfully travels back in time to before the explosion by focusing on O. B.

After centuries spent time slipping to learn from O. B., and after successfully guiding Timely in setting up the Throughput Multiplier, Loki learns that the Temporal Loom cannot be fixed due to the multiverse as it was not equipped to handle it. Loki realizes he has to time slip back to the Citadel and speaks with He Who Remains, who tells him that he was responsible for Loki's time slipping. Loki is told that the Temporal Loom is nothing but a failsafe designed to protect the Sacred Timeline and that Sylvie must die in order to reverse what happened. Unwilling to kill Sylvie, Loki time slips to speak with past versions of Mobius and Sylvie, who tells him that they could fight the multiversal war.

Believing that the TVA is the best line of defense against He Who Remains' variants and is necessary to exist, Loki decides to sacrifice his freedom by destroying the Temporal Loom, reviving the timelines with his magic, and rearranging them into a Yggdrasil-like structure. In doing so, he takes over He Who Remains' position, becoming the new keeper of time and the TVA. Inspired by Loki's actions, the TVA is reformed to preserve and protect the multiverse, and to hunt down He Who Remains' variants. Having finally found his glorious purpose, Loki sits alone on a throne at the center of the timelines that he now maintains, listening to his friends through them with a heartbroken but satisfied expression on his face.

Some time later, the Watcher shows Captain Peggy Carter the new Loki-maintained multiverse. (Note: As depicted in the ninth episode of the second season finale of What If...? (2023)) After Steve Rogers travels back in time to place the Infinity Stones in their proper timeline and returns to Peggy Carter in 1949, the couple are met by Loki at their home, who offers them his help.

== Alternate versions ==
=== 2013 variant ===
In an alternate 2013, Loki is in his holding cell in the dungeons of Asgard.

=== Loki ===
Multiple "variants" of Loki in addition to the 2012 variant appear in Loki.

==== Sylvie ====
Sylvie (portrayed by Sophia Di Martino as an adult and by Cailey Fleming as a child) is a female variant of Loki who seeks to "free" the Sacred Timeline from the TVA, developing a method of body possession to achieve her ends. Sylvie was first taken into custody by the TVA as a little girl, but escaped, and thereafter spent her life evading them.

==== Other variants ====
L to R: The Boastful, Alligator, Kid and Classic Loki variants as seen in "The Nexus Event". Marvel Studios President Kevin Feige said that seeing different versions of Loki was "part of the fun of the multiverse and playing with time".

- A variant of Loki dubbed "Boastful Loki" (portrayed by DeObia Oparei) wields a hammer and makes wild exaggerations about his accomplishments (including claiming to have defeated Captain America and Iron Man, and obtained the Infinity Stones). Boastful Loki attempts to betray the Classic, Kid, and Alligator variants by allying with President Loki to rule the Void, but fails.
- A reptilian variant of Loki dubbed "Alligator Loki" lives in the Void with fellow Loki variants. As he cannot speak, he gets closer to Kid Loki who treats him as a de facto pet. Loki head writer Michael Waldron included him "because he's green", describing it as an "irreverent" addition. Director Kate Herron used a "cartoony" stuffed alligator during filming, allowing actors to interact with it, with the onscreen version rendered using CGI.
- A younger variant of Loki dubbed "Kid Loki" (portrayed by Jack Veal) created a Nexus event by killing Thor. He considers himself the king of the Void although it seems only Classic Loki and Alligator Loki respect this title. He is based on the Marvel Comics character of the same name. He may be a reference to a story that Thor told Bruce Banner and Valkyrie in Thor: Ragnarok about a time when Loki attacked and stabbed him when Loki and Thor were eight.
- An elderly variant of Loki dubbed "Classic Loki" (portrayed by Richard E. Grant) grew old on an isolated planet after tricking Thanos and faking his death. Classic Loki has the ability to conjure larger, more elaborate illusions than Loki. This version sacrifices himself when creating an illusion of Asgard to allow Sylvie and Loki to enchant Alioth. His costume was inspired by his 1960s comic design by Jack Kirby.
- A variant of Loki dubbed "President Loki" (portrayed by Tom Hiddleston) created a Nexus event by becoming a president in his timeline. He attempts to rule the Void with an army of other variants, and is at odds with Kid Loki. Hiddleston called President Loki "the worst of the bad bunch", describing him as "the least vulnerable, the most autocratic and terrifyingly ambitious character who seems to have no empathy or care for anyone else". His costume design and characterisation was inspired by the comic miniseries Vote Loki by Christopher Hastings.
- A series of holographs of Loki variants are shown in a scene in the TVA, including one with the blue skin of a Frost Giant, another wearing the yellow jersey of the Tour de France leader and holding the race trophy, a third with a Hulk-like heavily muscled form, a fourth long-bearded variant with hooves, and a fifth appearing more like a traditional viking.
- Multiple Loki variants are shown to be part of President Loki's crew, including "Glamshades Loki" (the aforementioned long-bearded variant with hooves), "Poky Loki", "In Prison Loki", and "Bicycle Loki". These variants were named by costume designer Christine Wada.

=== What If...? ===
Several alternate versions of Loki appear in the animated series What If...?, with Hiddleston reprising his role.

==== Conquering the Earth ====
In an alternate 2011, following the death of Thor during his exile to Earth, Loki arrives with the Asgardian army to avenge him. Confronted by Nick Fury and S.H.I.E.L.D., he defeats them using the Casket of Ancient Winters before threatening to turn the entire world into ice. After negotiating with Fury, he agrees to give him until the next sunrise to find his brother's killer, whom Fury deduces to be Hank Pym. The two confront him in San Francisco and defeat him, but Loki decides to remain on Earth and quickly becomes its ruler while ending all conflict on Earth.

Sometime later, Fury assembles a resistance movement consisting of Steve Rogers and Carol Danvers to overthrow Loki and a battle ensues between S.H.I.E.L.D. and Loki's Asgardian forces. During the fight, a Natasha Romanoff from another universe appears and subdues Loki with his Scepter.

==== Frost Giant prince ====
In an alternate 965 A.D., an infant Loki is returned by Odin to Laufey, resulting in Loki growing up to be the Frost Giant prince of Jotunheim. Loki and Thor later meet under unknown circumstances and become best friends. In 2011, Loki attends Thor's intergalactic party on Earth alongside his fellow Frost Giants, who vandalize Mount Rushmore. Loki accidentally prevents Jane Foster from contacting Thor when, due to his large Frost Giant fingers, he drops and breaks Thor's cell phone. He and his Frost Giants later send the London Eye spinning off into one direction. When Thor intimidates the party guests into cleaning up while also mentioning that Frigga is coming, Loki's fellow Frost Giants put the London Eye back on its stand.

In "What If... Howard the Duck Got Hitched?", Loki was trying to have Jotunheim get its own ski resort at the time when Howard the Duck and Darcy Lewis approach him for help in protecting their unhatched offspring. He ended up having to help them when Laufey, S.H.I.E.L.D., Kaecilius, Malekith, Zeus, Thanos, and the Black Order started to target their egg. When Laufey started to grab it, Loki stopped him as Laufey stated that this will be coming out of his trust fund. Loki and Laufey later watch the egg emitting the energies that take out the attackers while Zeus fled. Laufey later reconciled with Loki, and accepted his ski resort offer.

==== Battle of New York ====
In an alternate 2012, Loki sent the Chitauri army to attack New York City in the Battle of New York. During the battle, he was confronted by Natasha Romanoff and Captain Peggy Carter and was apprehended.

==== 1602 Prince Loki ====
In an alternate 1602, Loki is the Prince and is a Shakespearean stage performer. As their universe is experiencing an impending incursion, a tear opens up and he is pulled towards it but is saved by Captain Peggy Carter. However, his sister, Queen Hela gets swept away and Thor becomes the King. While riding in a carriage with some women explaining his next performance, they get stopped by the arrival of Steve Rogers, Bucky Barnes, and Scott Lang, who want to steal their food. Later, Loki is present at the courtroom with Thor when Carter, Rogers, Barnes, Lang, and Tony Stark arrive to take the Scepter and witnesses the reveal that Rogers is the time-displaced person causing the incursion who Carter sends away.

==== Cowboy Loki ====
A cowboy version of Loki was among the universal killers and righteous heroes from different realities who were abducted by Doctor Strange Supreme to feed to the Forge, until they were freed by Captain Peggy Carter and returned home by Kahhori.

== Reception ==
The character of Loki "has been a fan favorite ever since his central role in 2012's The Avengers", becoming "one of the MCU's most beloved characters".

Following Tom Hiddleston's onstage appearance at San Diego Comic-Con in Hall H in 2013, a viral fan campaign and petition via Change.org was created to urge Marvel Studios to create a solo Loki film. The campaign, Free Loki, received media attention in publications including USA Today, The Hollywood Reporter, and The Guardian. It also became a platform for philanthropic efforts benefitting non-profits such as Operation Smile, and UNICEF. It has been suggested that this campaign influenced the eventual development of the Loki series on Disney+.

Hiddleston has also received a number of nominations and awards for his performance of the character.

=== Accolades ===
Year	Project	Award	Category	Result	Ref(s)
2011	Thor	Scream Awards	Scream Award for Breakout Performance – Male	Nominated	
2012	Thor	Empire Awards	Best Male Newcomer	Won	
2012	Thor	Saturn Awards	Best Supporting Actor	Nominated	
2012	The Avengers	Teen Choice Awards	Choice Movie: Villain	Nominated	
2013	The Avengers	Kids' Choice Awards	Favorite Villain	Nominated	
2013	The Avengers	MTV Movie Awards	Best Villain	Won	
2014	Thor: The Dark World	Empire Awards	Empire Award for Best Supporting Actor	Nominated	
2014	Thor: The Dark World	Saturn Awards	Saturn Award for Best Supporting Actor	Nominated	
2018	Thor: Ragnarok	Teen Choice Awards	Teen Choice Award for Choice Movie Scene Stealer	Nominated	
2021	Loki	People's Choice Awards	Male TV Star of 2021	Won	
2022	Loki	Critics' Choice Super Awards	Best Actor in a Superhero Series	Won	
2022	Loki	Kids' Choice Awards	Favorite Male TV Star (Family)	Won	
2022	Loki	MTV Movie & TV Awards	Best Team (Note: Shared with Sophia Di Martino and Owen Wilson.)	Won	
2022	Loki	Saturn Awards	Saturn Award for Best Actor in a Streaming Television Series	Nominated	
2024	Loki	Critics' Choice Television Awards	Best Actor in a Drama Series	Nominated	
2024	Loki	People's Choice Awards	Male TV Star of the Year	Nominated	
2024	Loki	Critics' Choice Super Awards	Best Actor in a Superhero Series, Limited Series or Made-for-TV Movie	Nominated	
2024	Loki	Kids' Choice Awards	Favorite Male TV Star (Family)	Nominated	
2024	Loki	Astra TV Awards	Best Actor in a Streaming Drama Series	Nominated	

== See also ==
- Characters of the Marvel Cinematic Universe
- Norse mythology in popular culture
