= Yellow jack (disambiguation) =

The yellow jack is a species of offshore marine fish in the jack family.

Yellow Jack(s) or Yellowjack(s) may also refer to:

- Yellow fever, an acute viral disease.
- Yellowjack, a name of the dragonfly Notogomphus praetorius
- Yellow Jack (play), a 1934 American play about the search for the causes and treatment of yellow fever.
- Yellow Jack, a 1938 film adaptation of the play
- Yellow Jack (flag), a yellow flag used to identify ships quarantined due to the presence of disease
- Yellowjacks, an aerobatic display team of the Royal Air Force

== See also ==
- Yellowjacket (disambiguation)
