= Yellowjacket (disambiguation) =

A yellowjacket is a black-and-yellow vespid wasp.

Yellowjacket(s) or Yellow Jacket(s) may also refer to:

== Places ==
- Yellow Jacket, Colorado, an unincorporated town
- Yellow Jacket, Florida, an unincorporated area in Dixie County, Florida

== Arts, entertainment, and media ==
=== Fictional characters ===
- Yellowjacket (Charlton Comics), the secret identity of Vince Harley, crime writer
- Yellowjacket (Marvel Comics)
  - Yellowjacket (Rita DeMara), a supervillainess and later superheroine, and member of the Masters of Evil and Guardians of the Galaxy
  - Darren Cross, the first villain fought by the second Ant-Man, Scott Lang
  - Hank Pym, a founding member of the Avengers

=== Music ===
- Yellowjackets (band), an American jazz fusion quartet
- "Yellowjacket", a 2021 song by Spiritbox from Eternal Blue

=== Other uses in arts, entertainment, and media ===
- Yellow Jacket (newspaper), the student newspaper for Waynesburg University
- Yellowjackets (TV series), an American thriller drama series broadcast from 2021
- Hodder & Stoughton 2/- Yellow Jackets, a book series published by Hodder & Stoughton

== Organizations and political movements ==
- Yellow Jackets (Indiana), a mounted militia company present at the Battle of Tippecanoe
- Yellow Jackets Movement, originally surrounding the French government's change of policy on diesel fuel.

== Sports teams and mascots ==
=== College ===
- American International Yellow Jackets of Springfield, Massachusetts
- Baldwin Wallace Yellow Jackets of Berea, Ohio
- Black Hills State University Yellow Jackets of Spearfish, South Dakota
- Cedarville University of Cedarville, Ohio
- Defiance College Yellow Jackets of Defiance, Ohio
- Georgia Tech Yellow Jackets of Atlanta, Georgia
- Howard Payne University Yellow Jackets of Brownwood, Texas
- LeTourneau University YellowJackets of Longview, Texas
- Montana State University Billings Yellowjackets of Billings, Montana
- University Center Rochester Yellowjackets of Rochester, Minnesota
- University of Rochester Yellowjackets of Rochester, New York
- University of Wisconsin–Superior Yellowjackets of Superior, Wisconsin
- Waynesburg University Yellow Jackets of Waynesburg, Pennsylvania

=== High school ===
- Berkeley High School (California) Yellow Jackets
- Bessemer City High School (North Carolina) Yellow Jackets
- Calhoun High School (Georgia) Yellow Jackets
- East Haven High School Yellowjackets of East Haven, Connecticut
- Gwynn Park High School Yellow Jackets of Prince George's County, Maryland
- Irmo High School Yellowjackets of Irmo, South Carolina
- Ithaca High School (Michigan) Yellow Jackets
- Lee County High School (Sanford, North Carolina) Yellow Jackets
- Perrysburg High School Yellow Jackets
- Sprayberry High School Yellow Jackets
- Springfield High School (Tennessee) Yellow Jackets

=== Other teams ===
- Frankford Yellow Jackets, a former National Football League team
- Iron Range Yellow Jackets, a former Junior "B" ice hockey team from Minnesota
- Pittsburgh Yellow Jackets, an amateur hockey team

== Trees ==
- Corymbia bloxsomei, a tree native to Queensland, Australia. Commonly known as Yellow Jacket
- Corymbia bunites, a tree native to Queensland, Australia. Commonly known as the Blackdown Yellow Jacket
- Corymbia leichhardtii, a tree native to Queensland, Australia. Commonly known as Yellow Jacket or Rusty Jacket
- Corymbia leptoloma, a tree native to Queensland, Australia. Commonly known as Yellow Jacket or Paluma Range Yellow Jacket
- Eucalyptus similis, a tree native to Queensland. Commonly known as the Queensland Yellow Jacket or the Inland Yellow Jacket

== Other uses ==
- Imperial yellow jacket, an Imperial honour in China during the Qing dynasty
- Little Yellow Jacket, a bull used in bull riding
- The Yellow Jacket, original name of The Varsity, a restaurant established 1928 in Atlanta, Georgia
- Yellow Jacket Case, a smart-phone case that doubles as a stun-gun
- Pentobarbital, a sedative known on the street as "yellow jackets"
- Yellow jackets protests, in France from 2018

== See also ==
- Yellow jack (disambiguation)
