= Notogomphus ruppeli =

Conservation status
- Endangered (IUCN 3.1)

Scientific classification
- Kingdom: Animalia
- Phylum: Arthropoda
- Class: Insecta
- Order: Odonata
- Infraorder: Anisoptera
- Family: Gomphidae
- Genus: Notogomphus
- Species: N. ruppeli

Binomial name
- Notogomphus ruppeli (Selys, 1858)

Species of dragonfly

Notogomphus ruppeli is a species of dragonfly in the family Gomphidae. It is endemic to Ethiopia. Its natural habitats are subtropical or tropical dry forests and rivers. It is threatened by habitat loss.
