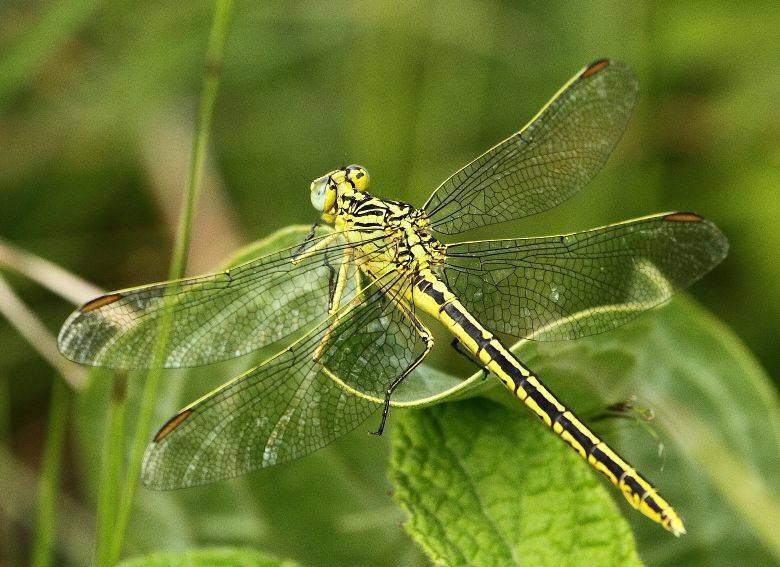
- Notogomphus praetorius

Scientific classification
- Kingdom: Animalia
- Phylum: Arthropoda
- Class: Insecta
- Order: Odonata
- Infraorder: Anisoptera
- Family: Gomphidae
- Genus: Notogomphus; Selys, 1858

= Notogomphus =

Genus of dragonflies

Notogomphus is a genus of dragonflies in the family Gomphidae. It contains the following species:

- Notogomphus anaci
- Notogomphus butoloensis
- Notogomphus cottarellii
- Notogomphus dendrohyrax
- Notogomphus dorsalis
- Notogomphus flavifrons
- Notogomphus kilimandjaricus
- Notogomphus lecythus
- Notogomphus leroyi
- Notogomphus lujai
- Notogomphus maathaiae
- Notogomphus maryae
- Notogomphus meruensis
- Notogomphus moorei
- Notogomphus praetorius
- Notogomphus ruppeli
- Notogomphus speciosus
- Notogomphus spinosus
- Notogomphus verschuereni
- Notogomphus zernyi
