= Notogomphus dendrohyrax =

Conservation status
- Least Concern (IUCN 3.1)

Scientific classification
- Kingdom: Animalia
- Phylum: Arthropoda
- Class: Insecta
- Order: Odonata
- Infraorder: Anisoptera
- Family: Gomphidae
- Genus: Notogomphus
- Species: N. dendrohyrax

Binomial name
- Notogomphus dendrohyrax (Förster, 1906)

Species of dragonfly

Notogomphus dendrohyrax is a species of dragonfly in the family Gomphidae. It is found in Malawi, Mozambique, Tanzania, and Zimbabwe. Its natural habitats are subtropical or tropical moist lowland forests and rivers. It is threatened by habitat loss.
