= Louisiana Business Technology Center =

Louisiana Business & Technology Center
- Industry: Business Technology
- Founder: LSU & Greater Baton Rouge Chamber of Commerce
- Headquarters: LSU Innovation Park, Baton Rouge, LA, United States
- Area served: All of Louisiana
- Key people: CHARLES F. D'AGOSTINO (Executive Director); KRISTY L. BARLOW (Business Incubator Manager)

The Louisiana Business & Technology Center (LBTC) at Louisiana State University plays an important role to the state's flagship university, Louisiana State University as a part of LSU's Office of Research and Economic Development. LBTC's primary goal is to increase the economic growth of Louisiana by enhancing the development of small businesses and assisting in the development of new businesses. The center is ranked among the top ten entrepreneur programs in the nation. In 1988 it was jointly funded through LSU and the Greater Baton Rouge Chamber of Commerce to foster economic growth in Louisiana by providing businesses with applications and tools necessary for growth and survival in the real world. It comprises the Louisiana Technology Transfer Office (LTTO), the LBTC Business Incubator, and the LSU Student Incubator.

== Background ==
In 1988, the LBTC began its operations on LSU's Campus as a joint venture between LSU, the Louisiana Public Facilities Authority and the Greater Baton Rouge Chamber of Commerce. The LBTC is currently located at the LSU Innovation Park.

The LBTC has helped Louisiana companies obtain more than $163 million in equity, grants, and loans; has assisted over 6,000 businesses and entrepreneurs; and has graduated 140 companies from its incubator creating 2,278 jobs with 110 of these businesses still in business= 78% success rate.

== LBTC Mobile Classroom ==
In 2005, the LBTC introduced their Mobile Classroom to bring entrepreneurship training to underserved rural areas of Louisiana. The LBTC's Mobile Classroom, a.k.a. "Driving Louisiana's Economy," is an 18-wheel truck that contains monitors and equipment, and can seat up to 30 people. Seminars and training classes are held for entrepreneurs and small business owners to learn more about tips and tools for success. The mobile unit has expanded LBTC’s outreach to serve more than 350 businesses annually and fits up to 30 individuals. The Mobile Classroom is able to host seminars and training for technology usage, marketing and financial advice, international trade, and more.

After the disaster that ensued post-Hurricane Katrina and Hurricane Rita, the Mobile Classroom visited impacted disaster areas to provide disaster recovery business counseling to those affected by the hurricane.

== Incubator Facilities ==
The Louisiana Business & Technology Center is located at the LSU Innovation Park (8000 GSRI Avenue Building 3000 Baton Rouge, LA 70820). The incubator provides mail service, office space, building management, internet access, telecommunication services, conference rooms, access to audio visual equipment, professional receptionist, clerical support, technology transfer assistance, knowledge resources, and labs.

== Soft Landings at the LBTC ==
The LBTC was designated a Soft Landings International Incubator in 2011. There are only 23 incubators in the world that hold this title. The National Business Incubation Association (NBIA) Soft Landings designation lets foreign firms know that NBIA, the world's leading organization advancing business incubation and entrepreneurship, has identified an incubator as having specialized programs and/or facilities for helping companies break into new markets.

== LBTC Consulting ==
The LBTC provides consulting in the following areas: international trade, business planning, market planning, financial modeling, accessing capital, as well as training in current business trends, and technology transfer.

The LBTC consists of 9 full-time staff members, 4 of whom, are business consultants, Flores MBA Graduate Students, and LSU Student Workers.

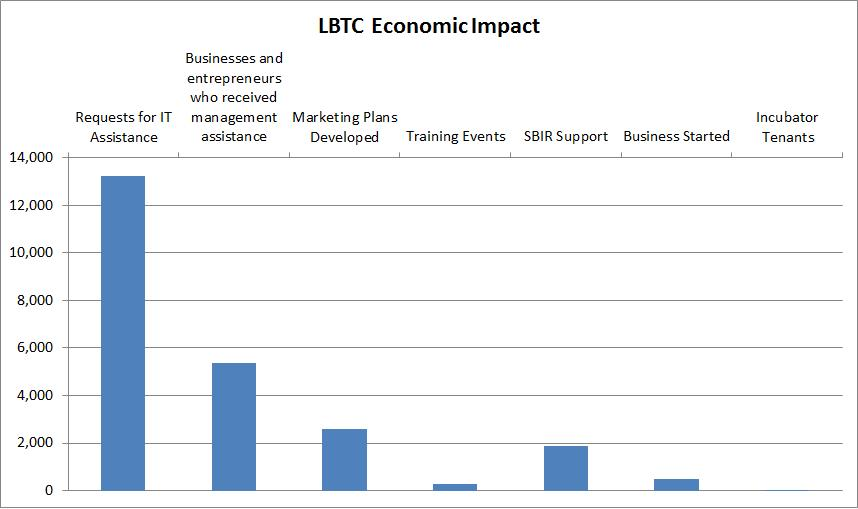
LBTC Economic Contributions

== Louisiana Technology Transfer Office ==
A subset of the LBTC located at the LSU Innovation Park, originated in 1990 on the LSU Campus. Under the executive order MJF 96-22, LSU must maintain a LTTO at Stennis Space Center to accommodate NASA’s Technology Transfer Program. NASA is one of many technology resource networks including SERTTC and the Federal Laboratory Consortium for Technology Transfer. The LTTO is funded through grants and contracts from Louisiana Economic Development, the Louisiana Board of Regents, NASA and U.S. Small Business Administration.

== LSU Student Incubator ==
The LSU Student Incubator is a place for entrepreneurial LSU Students to launch and grow their business. The LBTC assists students in the development of their business plan and helps with various aspects from marketing to funding. In addition to consulting, the LBTC provides a 1200 square foot co-working space for exclusive use by student incubator tenants with the standard functionality of a regular office space. In addition to space, the LBTC hosts an annual business plan competition, the Venture Challenge, for its student incubator tenants. The last competition, held on April 20, 2012, offered $20,000 to the top four companies including: PhycoGenesis, Yellow Jacket Case, LocalMed, and Bluereach. Notable Companies from the incubator: Big Fish Presentations, Yellow Jacket, BlueReach, and HitLights LED.
