= Notogomphus kilimandjaricus =

Conservation status
- Least Concern (IUCN 3.1)

Scientific classification
- Kingdom: Animalia
- Phylum: Arthropoda
- Class: Insecta
- Order: Odonata
- Infraorder: Anisoptera
- Family: Gomphidae
- Genus: Notogomphus
- Species: N. kilimandjaricus

Binomial name
- Notogomphus kilimandjaricus (Sjöstedt, 1909)

Synonyms
- Notogomphus meruensis (Sjöstedt, 1909)

Species of dragonfly

Notogomphus kilimandjaricus is a species of dragonfly in the family Gomphidae. It is found in Kenya and Tanzania. Its natural habitats are dry savanna, moist savanna, subtropical or tropical dry shrubland, subtropical or tropical moist shrubland, and rivers.
