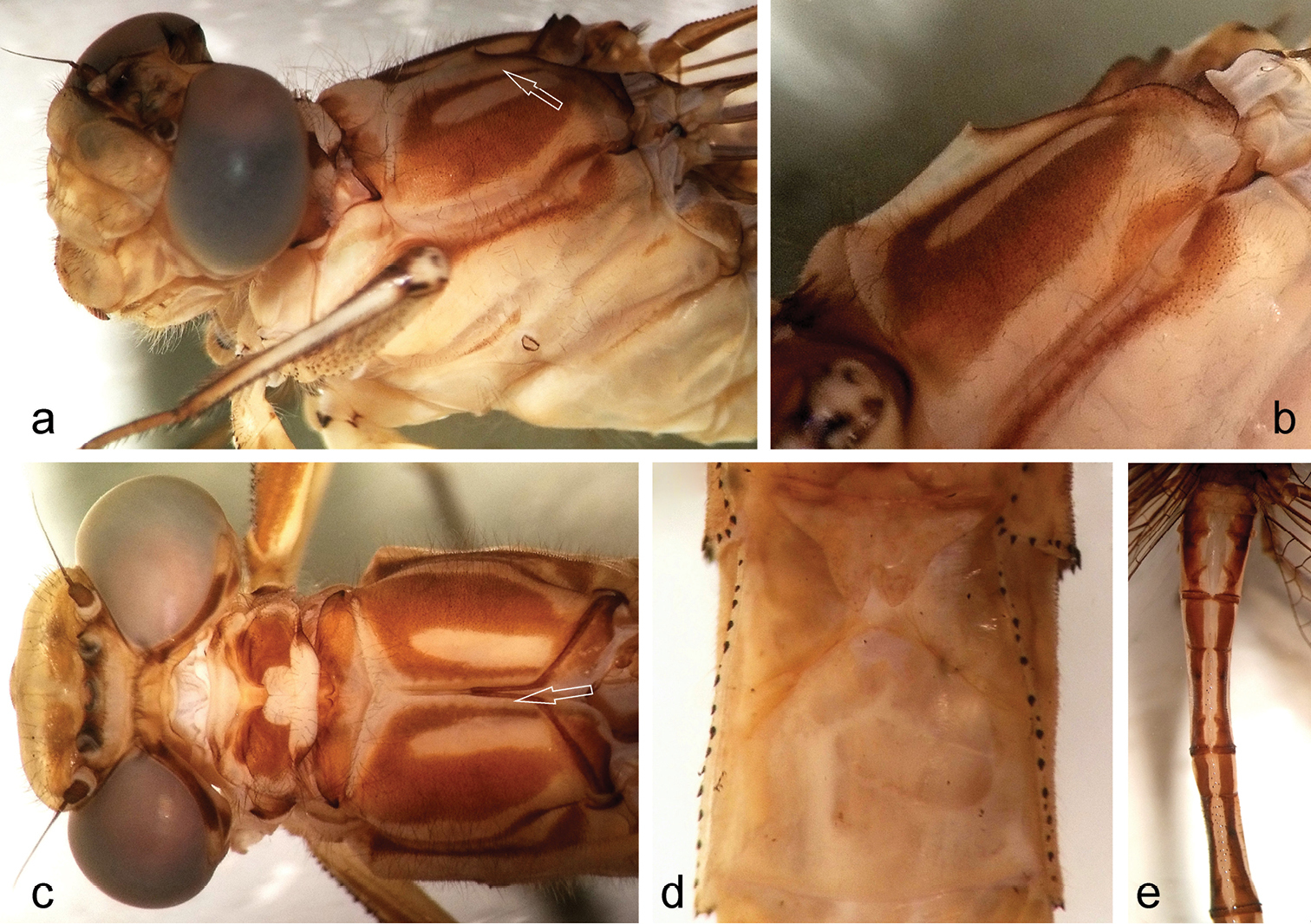

Conservation status
- Least Concern (IUCN 3.1)

Scientific classification
- Kingdom: Animalia
- Phylum: Arthropoda
- Class: Insecta
- Order: Odonata
- Infraorder: Anisoptera
- Family: Gomphidae
- Genus: Notogomphus
- Species: N. zernyi

Binomial name
- Notogomphus zernyi (St. Quentin, 1942)

= Notogomphus zernyi =

Species of dragonfly

Notogomphus zernyi is a species of dragonfly in the family Gomphidae. It is found in the Democratic Republic of the Congo, Malawi, Mozambique, Tanzania, and Zimbabwe. Its natural habitats are subtropical or tropical moist lowland forests, moist savanna, subtropical or tropical dry shrubland, subtropical or tropical moist shrubland, and rivers.
