= Notogomphus maathaiae =

Conservation status
- Endangered (IUCN 3.1)

Scientific classification
- Kingdom: Animalia
- Phylum: Arthropoda
- Clade: Pancrustacea
- Class: Insecta
- Order: Odonata
- Suborder: Anisoptera
- Family: Gomphidae
- Genus: Notogomphus
- Species: N. maathaiae

Binomial name
- Notogomphus maathaiae (Clausnitzer & Dijkstra, 2005)

Species of dragonfly

Notogomphus maathaiae, commonly known as Maathai's longleg, is a species of dragonfly in the clubtail family Gomphidae. It is thought to be endemic montane streams in Kenya. The species is considered endangered because the continued destruction of its montane forest habitat by humans creates a very high risk of extinction in the near future.

The species was described by Viola Clausnitzer and Klaas-Douwe B. Dijkstra in 2005. They named it in honor of Wangari Maathai, founder of the Green Belt Movement and the first African woman to receive a Nobel Peace Prize.

== See also ==
- List of organisms named after famous people (born 1925–1949)
