= Notogomphus flavifrons =

Conservation status
- Data Deficient (IUCN 3.1)

Scientific classification
- Kingdom: Animalia
- Phylum: Arthropoda
- Class: Insecta
- Order: Odonata
- Infraorder: Anisoptera
- Family: Gomphidae
- Genus: Notogomphus
- Species: N. flavifrons

Binomial name
- Notogomphus flavifrons Fraser, 1952

Species of dragonfly

Notogomphus flavifrons is a species of dragonfly in the family Gomphidae. It is endemic to Uganda. Its natural habitats are subtropical or tropical moist lowland forests and rivers. It is threatened by habitat loss.
