= Notogomphus leroyi =

Conservation status
- Least Concern (IUCN 3.1)

Scientific classification
- Kingdom: Animalia
- Phylum: Arthropoda
- Class: Insecta
- Order: Odonata
- Infraorder: Anisoptera
- Family: Gomphidae
- Genus: Notogomphus
- Species: N. leroyi

Binomial name
- Notogomphus leroyi (Schouteden, 1934)

Species of dragonfly

Notogomphus leroyi is a species of dragonfly in the family Gomphidae. It is found in the Republic of the Congo, the Democratic Republic of the Congo, Kenya, Tanzania, and Uganda. Its natural habitats are subtropical or tropical moist lowland forests and rivers.
