= Notogomphus dorsalis =

Conservation status
- Least Concern (IUCN 3.1)

Scientific classification
- Kingdom: Animalia
- Phylum: Arthropoda
- Class: Insecta
- Order: Odonata
- Infraorder: Anisoptera
- Family: Gomphidae
- Genus: Notogomphus
- Species: N. dorsalis

Binomial name
- Notogomphus dorsalis (Selys, 1857)

Species of dragonfly

Notogomphus dorsalis is a species of dragonfly in the family Gomphidae. It is found in the Democratic Republic of the Congo, Ethiopia, Kenya, Tanzania, and Uganda. Its natural habitats are subtropical or tropical dry forests, subtropical or tropical moist lowland forests, and rivers.
