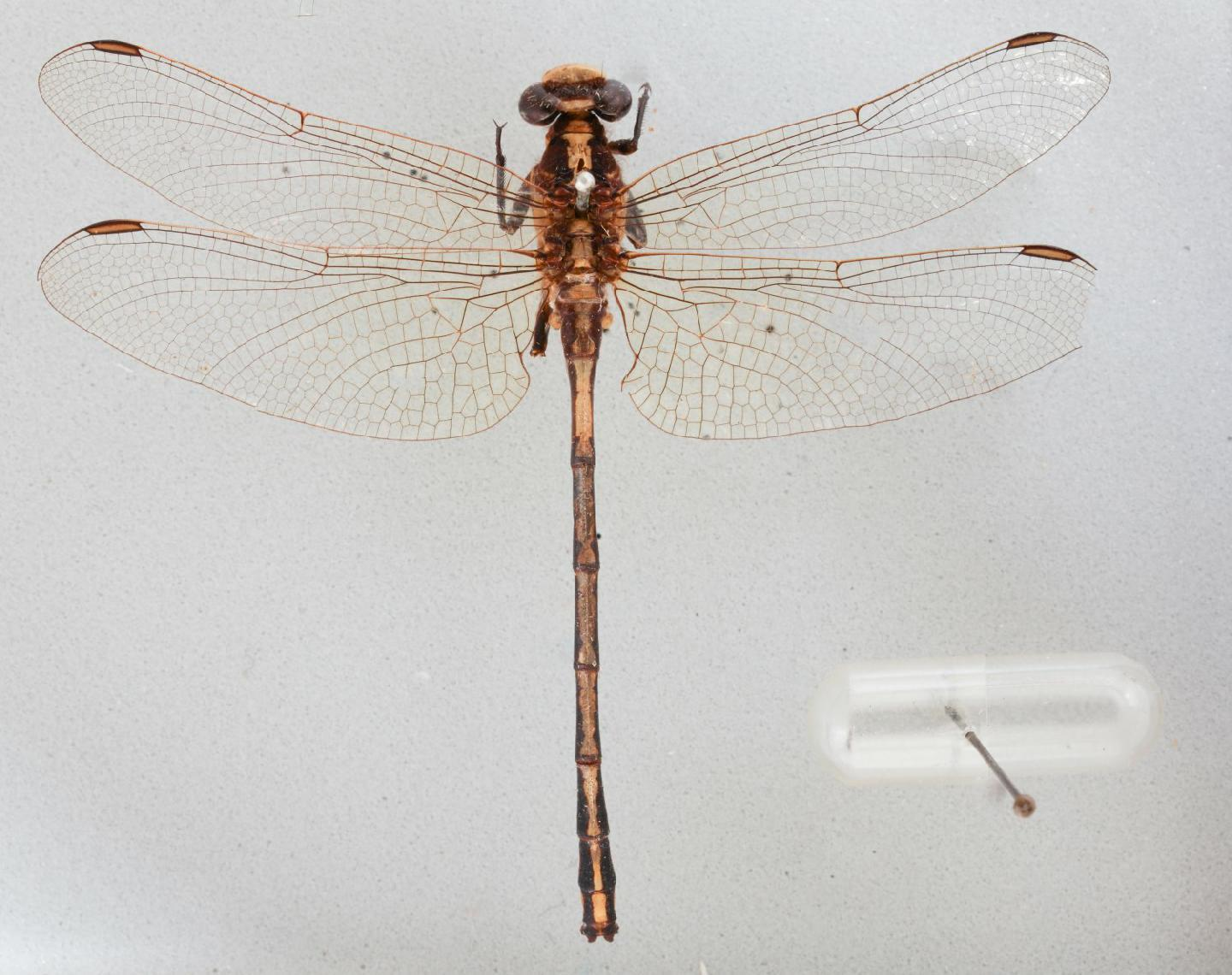
- Dorsal view of the holotype specimen in the Natural History Museum, London

Conservation status
- Least Concern (IUCN 3.1)

Scientific classification
- Kingdom: Animalia
- Phylum: Arthropoda
- Class: Insecta
- Order: Odonata
- Infraorder: Anisoptera
- Family: Gomphidae
- Genus: Notogomphus
- Species: N. lecythus

Binomial name
- Notogomphus lecythus Campion, 1923

Synonyms
- Notogomphus immisericors Campion, 1923; Notogomphus cataractae Consiglio, 1978

= Notogomphus lecythus =

Species of dragonfly

Notogomphus lecythus, commonly known as the northern longleg, is a species of dragonfly in the family Gomphidae. It is found in Ethiopia and Kenya. Its natural habitats are subtropical or tropical moist lowland forests, subtropical or tropical dry shrubland, subtropical or tropical moist shrubland, and rivers.

== Taxonomy ==
In 1923, entomologist Herbert Campion published a study in which he erected several new species of dragonflies belonging to the genus Notogomphus. He gave one of these species the name Notogomphus lecythus, the specific name referencing the yellow pattern on its thorax resembling a lekythos in shape. The holotype specimen is an adult male collected from Zegi, Lake Tana in Ethiopia (referred to as Abyssinia by Campion). In the same study, Campion established another species which he named Notogomphus immisericors, with the holotype being a female found 5,700–6,200 ft (1,737.4–1,889.8 m) above sea level on the Nandi Plateau of Kenya, and two other females were designated as paratypes. Campion noted that N. lecythus and N. immisericors are extremely similar, but considered them to be separate species based on differences in the hind wings and the femurs of the hind legs. Later in 1973, a male dragonfly was caught in Kaffa Province, Ethiopia by Carlo Consiglio and deposited in the Sezione Museo of the Istituto di Zoologia, Rome. Consiglio described this specimen five years later as the holotype of a new species which he named Notogomphus cataractae, claiming the lack of an anal loop on the hind wings of this species differentiated it from N. immisericors, and made no comparison to the type specimen of N. lecythus.

A study by Viola Clausnitzer published in 2003 reanalyzed the specimens named as N. lecythus, N. immisericors and N. cataractae, and discovered that there was no significant difference between the three supposed species, and that the features used to distinguish them were simply individual variation. Because N. lecythus was named first, the other two names were declared as junior synonyms of it.
