= Yellowjacket (comics) =

Yellowjacket may refer to:

- Yellowjacket (Marvel Comics):
  - Hank Pym (also known as Ant-Man, Giant-Man and Goliath), a founding member of the Avengers.
  - Yellowjacket (Rita DeMara), who began as a supervillain but later became a superhero. She has been a member of the Masters of Evil and the Guardians of the Galaxy.
- Yellowjacket (Charlton Comics), a superhero who gains the ability to control yellowjackets after jewel thieves pour a box of them on him.

== See also ==
- Yellowjacket (disambiguation), the main disambiguation page
