= Notogomphus lujai =

Conservation status
- Least Concern (IUCN 3.1)

Scientific classification
- Kingdom: Animalia
- Phylum: Arthropoda
- Class: Insecta
- Order: Odonata
- Infraorder: Anisoptera
- Family: Gomphidae
- Genus: Notogomphus
- Species: N. lujai

Binomial name
- Notogomphus lujai (Schouteden, 1934)

Species of dragonfly

Notogomphus lujai is a species of dragonfly in the family Gomphidae. It is found in the Republic of the Congo, the Democratic Republic of the Congo, Kenya, Tanzania, and Uganda. Its natural habitats are subtropical or tropical moist lowland forests and rivers.
