= The Yellow Jacket (newspaper) =

Student newspaper in Pennsylvania, US

- Student produced since 1924
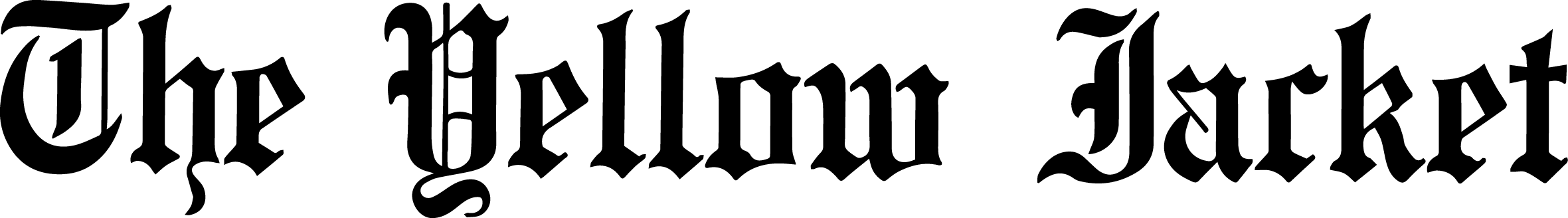
- Type: Student Weekly Newspaper
- Format: Broadsheet
- School: Waynesburg University
- Owner: Waynesburg University
- Founded: 1924
- Headquarters: 51 W College St. Waynesburg, Pennsylvania 15370
- City: Waynesburg, Pa
- Country: United States
- Circulation: 1,200 weekly
- Website: theyellowjacket.org
- Free online archives: https://issuu.com/wuyellowjacket

The Yellow Jacket is the student newspaper for Waynesburg University. The newspaper is produced entirely by Waynesburg University students and is incorporated into many classes within the university's Department of Communication. The Yellow Jacket features news on campus and community news, student opinion, coverage of the Presidents' Athletic Conference sports teams, and other topics of student or faculty interest. The Yellow Jacket publishes weekly during the academic year in print and online. The newspaper has been published under the Yellow Jacket nameplate since 1924, though student newspapers at Waynesburg University (then Waynesburg College) date back to 1894. Federal Judge John Clark Knox served as the first student editor of the first student newspaper at Waynesburg College.

The Yellow Jacket is a member of the Pennsylvania NewsMedia Association and is affiliated with the Waynesburg University student chapter of the Society of Professional Journalists.

== Awards and nominations ==
The student staff of the Yellow Jacket has been recognized with over three dozen awards by the Society of Professional Journalists' Mark of Excellence competition and the Pennsylvania NewsMedia Association. In addition to individual or team awards, the newspaper has been recognized by SPJ with the Best All-Around Non-Daily Newspaper award in Region 4 twice (2004 and 2016) and a regional finalist in 2003, 2013, and 2014. In 2016, a team of student writers—Kimmi Baston, Anthony Conn, Teghan Simonton, and Mattie Winowitch—were named by SPJ as the National Winner in the In-Depth Reporting Category for a series on opioid abuse in Southwestern Pennsylvania.
