= Yellow Jacket Case =

Stinger Solutions, LLC
- Industry: Consumer Electronics
- Headquarters: Baton Rouge, LA
- Key people: Joseph Jobe Chris Zavala Thom Buck
- Products: Yellow Jacket Phone Case
- Website: https://www.yellowjacketcase.com

Yellow Jacket Case is a smart phone case that doubles as a stun gun. It was invented by former military police officer Seth Froom in response to being robbed at gun-point in his own home. The Yellow Jacket case houses a 650,000V Stun-gun.

Yellow Jacket was originally a tenant of the Student Incubator at the Louisiana Business Technology Center and was a prize winner of the Venture Challenge business plan competition. Now Yellow Jacket is produced by Stinger Solutions, LLC.
