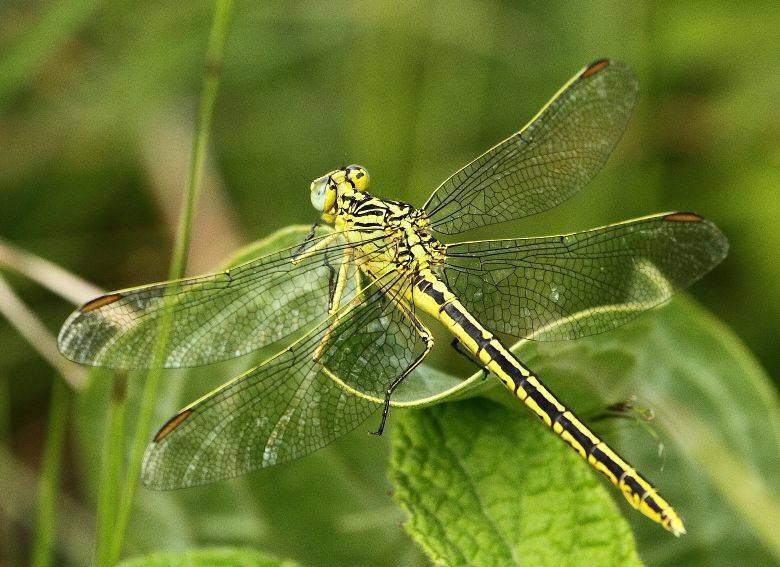
- Female

Conservation status
- Least Concern (IUCN 3.1)

Scientific classification
- Kingdom: Animalia
- Phylum: Arthropoda
- Class: Insecta
- Order: Odonata
- Infraorder: Anisoptera
- Family: Gomphidae
- Genus: Notogomphus
- Species: N. praetorius

Binomial name
- Notogomphus praetorius (Selys, 1878)

= Notogomphus praetorius =

Species of dragonfly

Notogomphus praetorius is a species of dragonfly in the family Gomphidae; common names include yellowjack, southern yellowjack and yellowjack longlegs.

== Distribution ==
Southern Africa: Widespread in eastern South Africa, eastern Zimbabwe, Zambia, and the southern part of the Democratic Republic of the Congo. Also recorded in Namibia, Angola, Malawi and Mozambique.

== Habitat ==
Found in and near streams and rivers, both in forests and grasslands; mostly in highlands.
